= List of Channel 4 television programmes =

Overview of the UK broadcast network's shows

This is a list of programmes broadcast by Channel 4 that have Wikipedia articles. Channel 4 is one of the five major terrestrial television channels in the United Kingdom. The dates shown are for the programme's original broadcast.

== Animation ==
- A Grand Day Out (Aardman Animations; on C4 1990; moved to the BBC in 1993)
- Angry Kid (Aardman Animations; on C4 1998–2002)
- The Bear (1998)
- Beavis and Butt-Head (US import; on C4 1994–1999)
- Bob and Margaret (Canadian co-production between Snowden Fine Animation and Nelvana for Global; 1998-2001 (Seasons 1 and 2 only))
- Bromwell High (Canadian co-production between Hat Trick Productions and Decode for Teletoon; 2005 (Episodes 1–6); Episodes 7-13 were released straight to DVD in 2006)
- Clone High (US/Canada import; on C4 2003)
- Crapston Villas (1995–1998)
- Creature Comforts (short film that was part of the Lip Synch series in 1989)
- Deadsville (2006)
- Dick Spanner, P.I. (1986–1987)
- Don't Hug Me I'm Scared (Sep 2022-)
- Duncanville (US import; on C4 2020 (Season 1))(Moved to E4 2021 (Season 2))
- Empire Square (2005–2006)
- Family Guy (US import; on C4 1999–2005; Moved to the BBC from 2005 to 2016 and ITV2 from 2016 onwards)
- Famous Fred (1996)
- Father Christmas (1991)
- Four-Mations (animation programming block; 1990–1998)
- Full English (2012)
- Futurama (US import, on C4 1999–2007; moved to Sky Three/Pick TV during the late 2000s and early 2010s)
- Going Equipped (short film that was part of the Lip Synch series in 1990)
- Granpa (1989)
- House of Rock (2000–2002)
- Ivor the Invisible (2001)
- King of the Hill (US import; on C4 1997–2010)
- Lip Synch (1989–1990)
- MAD (US import)
- Next (short film that was part of the Lip Synch series in 1990)
- Olive, the Other Reindeer (US import)
- The PJs (US import)
- Pond Life (1996, 2000)
- Prep & Landing (US import)
- Prep & Landing: Naughty vs. Nice (US import)
- The Ricky Gervais Show (animated comedy; 2010–2012)
- Rick and Morty (US import; 2019 – present)
- The Simpsons (US import; on C4 November 2004 – present)
- The Snowman (1982)
- The Snowman and the Snowdog (2012)
- Soul Music (1998)
- South Park (US import; on C4 1998–2006)
- The Tiger Who Came to Tea (2019)
- Top Cat (US import, listed as "Boss Cat")
- War Story (short film that was part of the Lip Synch series in 1990)
- We're Going on a Bear Hunt (2016)
- Wowser (Japan import)
- Wyrd Sisters (1997)

== Breakfast ==
- The Big Breakfast (1992–2002, 2022)
- The Channel Four Daily (1989–92)
- Freshly Squeezed (2006–12)
- Morning Glory (2006)
- RI:SE (2002–03)

== Children's ==
- 2 Stupid Dogs (US import)
- Aaahh!!! Real Monsters (US import)
- The Adventures of Batman
- The Adventures of the Little Prince (Japan import)
- The Adventures of Sam & Max: Freelance Police (US/Canada import)
- Adventures of Sonic the Hedgehog (US/Italy/Spain import)
- The Adventures of Super Mario Bros. 3 (US/Italy/Canada import)
- The Adventures of T-Rex (Japan/France/US import)
- The Adventures of Tintin (Canada/France import) (now on BBC Alba)
- Alfred J. Kwak (Netherlands/Germany/Japan import)
- Angela Anaconda (US/Canada import)
- Babar
- Baby Huey
- Back to the Future
- Bagpuss
- The Banana Splits
- Barbapapa
- Biker Mice from Mars (US import; on C4 1993–1996)
- The Bluffers
- Bobobobs (Spain import)
- The Bored Witch (Spain import)
- Bug Alert (series 1 & 2 originally broadcast on GMTV; series 3 produced for C4)
- Camberwick Green (originally broadcast on BBC; on C4 1994–2000)
- The Care Bears Family
- CatDog (US import; on C4 1999–2007)
- The Clangers
- Cubeez (originally broadcast on ITV; on C4 2005–2006)
- Danger Mouse (originally broadcast on ITV 1981–1992)
- Dennis (US import)
- Deputy Dawg
- Dig & Dug with Daisy (1994)
- Dog City
- Donkey Kong Country
- Double Act (TV film; 2002)
- Doug (Nickelodeon version only)
- Droopy
- Dumb and Dumber (US import)
- Earthworm Jim (US import)
- Eureeka's Castle
- The Ferals
- Flash Gordon (animation; US/Canada/France import)
- Foofur
- Fourways Farm (1993–1996)
- Franklin (1998–2004)
- Free Willy (US/Canada import)
- The Get Along Gang (France/US import; originally broadcast on ITV)
- Gophers! (1988–1990)
- Grim Tales (originally broadcast on ITV)
- Hammerman
- Heathcliff (France/Canada/US import)
- Hector Heathcote
- Helping Henry (educational; 1988)
- The Herbs
- Herman and Katnip
- Home to Rent (France import: Series 1 on C4 1998)
- Hong Kong Phooey
- The Hoobs (2001–2014)
- Insektors (1994–1995)
- Inspector Gadget
- The Investigators (educational; 1999-)
- Ivor the Engine
- Iznogoud
- Jayce and the Wheeled Warriors (France/Canada import)
- Johnny Bravo (US import)
- Junior Bake Off (2019-)
- Katie and Orbie (Canada import)
- Kaput & Zösky (France/Canada import)
- The Kids from Room 402
- Kid 'n Play
- King Arthur and the Knights of Justice
- The KNTV Show (educational; 2006–2008)
- la linea (Italy import)
- Laurel and Hardy (animation; US import)
- The Legend of White Fang (Canada import)
- The Little Lulu Show
- Lift Off
- Little Dracula (US import)
- Little Rosie
- Little Shop
- Looney Tunes (US import)
- Madeline
- The Magic Roundabout (redubbed; 1992–1993)
- The Magic School Bus
- M.A.S.K. (1990)
- Mio Mao (2007)
- Monster Maker (US import)
- Monster Tails (US import)
- Moschops (originally broadcast on ITV 1983; on C4 1988)
- Mr Men (originally broadcast on BBC 1974–1978)
- The Muppets Celebrate Jim Henson (US import)
- Murun Buchstansangur (1982–1989)
- Noggin the Nog
- Ovide and the Gang
- Paddington (originally broadcast on BBC)
- Pat & Mat
- Pelswick (2002–2004)
- The Pink Panther
- Pinwheel (US import)
- Pippi Longstocking
- Planet Cook (originally broadcast on CBBC in 2005; on C4 2009–2010)
- Pob's Programme (1985–1990)
- Popeye
- ProStars
- Rocko's Modern Life (US import)
- Rocky Hollow
- Roobarb
- Saber Rider and the Star Sheriffs
- Sali Mali (originally broadcast on S4C)
- Salty's Lighthouse
- Saved by the Bell (US import)
- The Secret World of Alex Mack
- Sesame Street (US import; on C4 1987–2001)
- Sharky & George (US import)
- Simon in the Land of Chalk Drawings (originally broadcast on ITV; on C4 1988)
- Spider-Man (US import)
- Spiff and Hercules (France import; on C4 1993)
- Square Pegs (US import; on C4 1983-)
- The Storyteller
- Street Sharks
- Stunt Dawgs
- Super Dave: Daredevil for Hire (US/Italy import)
- Super Mario World (US/Italy/Canada import)
- Tales of the Riverbank (1995–1998)
- TerryToons
- Totally Spies (France and Canada import)
- Towser
- The Trap Door (originally broadcast on ITV; on C4 1996–2004)
- The Treacle People (originally broadcast on CITV)
- Trumpton
- Ulysses 31 (France/Japan import) (also on CBBC)
- The Untouchables of Elliot Mouse (Spain import)
- Victor and Maria
- Voltron: Defender Of The Universe
- Where on Earth Is Carmen Sandiego?
- Wise Up (educational; 1995–2000)
- Wish Kid (US/Italy import)
- The Wombles (originally broadcast on BBC One and ITV; on C4 1992–1995)
- The Wonderful Wizard of Oz (Japan import)
- Yo Gabba Gabba! (US import, originally broadcast on Nick Jr., 2009–2011)
- Worzel Gummidge Down Under (1987–1989)
- The Zack Files

== Comedy ==
- 3rd Rock from the Sun (US import)
- 8 Out of 10 Cats (2005-)
- 8 Out of 10 Cats Does Countdown (2012-)
- 10 O'Clock Live (2011–2013)
- The 11 O'Clock Show (1998–2000)
- 18 Stone of Idiot (2005)
- A Comedy Roast (2010–2011)
- A Fine Romance (originally broadcast on ITV; on C4 1983)
- A Stab in the Dark (1992)
- The Abbott and Costello Show (US import; on C4 1982-)
- Absolutely (1989–1993)
- According to Jim (US import)
- The Adam and Joe Show (1996–2001)
- The Addams Family (US import; on C4 1983–)
- Anna & Katy (pilot 2011; series 2013)
- Archie Bunker's Place (US import; on C4 1983)
- The Armando Iannucci Shows (2001)
- Armstrong and Miller (1997–2001)
- Back (2017–2021)
- Bad News Tour (1983; part of The Comic Strip Presents...)
- Bad Sugar (2012)
- Ballot Monkeys (2015)
- Balls of Steel (2005–2008)
- Ban This Filth (2004)
- Banzai (2001–2003)
- Barking (1998)
- Best of the Worst (2006)
- Bewitched (US import)
- The Big Bang Theory (US import)
- Big Boys (2022-)
- The Big Fat Quiz of the Year (2004-)
- Big Mood (2024-2026)
- Black Books (2000–2004)
- Black-ish (US import)
- Blue Heaven (pilot 1992; series 1994)
- Blunder (2006)
- Bo' Selecta! (2002–2009)
- Borat's Television Programme (2004)
- Boyz Unlimited (1999)
- Brass (third series 1990; the first two series were originally broadcast on ITV 1983–1984)
- Brass Eye (1997; 2001)
- Break Clause (2026)
- Bremner, Bird and Fortune (1999–2010)
- Bring Back... (2005–2009)
- Britain's Got the Pop Factor... and Possibly a New Celebrity Jesus Christ Soapstar Superstar Strictly on Ice (2008)
- British Comedy Awards (2011–2014)
- The Bronx Bunny Show (2003)
- Buffalo Bill (US import)
- The Bullshitters: Roll Out the Gunbarrel (1984)
- Campus (pilot 2009; series 2011)
- Capstick Capers (1983)
- Captain Butler (1997)
- Car 54, Where Are You? (US import; on C4 1983-)
- Cardinal Burns (2012–2014)
- Caroline in the City (US import)
- Catastrophe (2015–2019)
- Chance in a Million (1984–1986)
- Channel 4's Comedy Gala (2010–2016)
- Cheers (US import; on C4 1983-)
- Chelmsford 123 (1988–1990)
- Chivalry (2022)
- Chris Moyles' Quiz Night (2009–2012)
- Comedy Lab (1998–2011)
- Comedy Showcase (2007–2012)
- Comedy World Cup (2012)
- The Comic Strip Presents (1982–1988, 1998, 2000, 2005, 2011)
- The Cosby Show (US import)
- Cows (1997)
- The Curse (2022)
- Cybill (US import)
- Da Ali G Show (2000–2003)
- Damned (2016–2018)
- Desmond's (1989–1994)
- Derry Girls (2018–2022)
- The Dick Van Dyke Show (US import; on C4 1983)
- Didn't You Kill My Brother? (1988; part of The Comic Strip Presents...)
- Dogface (originally broadcast on E4; 2007)
- Don't Hug Me I'm Scared (2022-)
- Dream Stuffing (1984)
- Dressing for Breakfast (1995–1998)
- Drop the Dead Donkey (1990–1998)
- Eat the Rich (C4 film; 1987)
- Ellen (US import)
- The Estate Agents (2002)
- Everybody Loves Raymond (US import)
- Everyone Else Burns (2023)
- Exploitica (1998–2000)
- Facejacker (2010–2012)
- Fairly Secret Army (1984–1986)
- FAQ U (2005)
- Father Ted (1995–1998)
- Feeling Nuts Comedy Night (comedy and health awareness; 2014)
- Finding Father Christmas (2025)
- Five Go Mad in Dorset (1982; part of The Comic Strip Presents...)
- Flipside (2004)
- Flowers (2016–2018)
- Fonejacker (2008)
- Frank of Ireland (2021)
- Frankie Boyle's Tramadol Nights (2010)
- Frasier (US import)
- Free Agents (2009)
- Friday Night Dinner (2011–2020)
- Friday Night Live (1988, comedy and music)
- Friends (US import)
- GameFace (pilot 2014; series 2017-)
- Garth Marenghi's Darkplace (2004)
- Gash (2003)
- Generation Z (2024)
- Geraldine: The Winner's Story (2008)
- Get Smart (US import; on C4 1983–)
- The Golden Girls (US import)
- Greed (Film4 Production, on C4 2023)
- Green Wing (2004–2007)
- Gregg Wallace: The British Miracle Meat (2023)
- Gunston's Australia (Australia import)
- Hang Ups (2018)
- Happy Endings (US import)
- Harry Hill (1997–2000)
- Here's Lucy (US import; on C4 1983)
- Heroes of Comedy (1995–2003)
- Hit the Road Jack (2012)
- Home Improvement (US import)
- The Horne Section TV Show (2022)
- Hullraisers (2022)
- The Hunt for Tony Blair (2011; part of The Comic Strip Presents...)
- Hung Out (2010)
- I Dream of Jeannie (US import)
- I Love Lucy (US import; on C4 1982–)
- I'm Spazticus (2012–2013)
- The Inbetweeners (originally broadcast on E4)
- In Exile (1998)
- Is it Legal? (Series 3; 1998)
- The IT Crowd (2006–2010; 2013)
- It Gets Worse (2026)
- It Takes a Worried Man (1983; series 1 & 2 originally broadcast on ITV, series 3 produced for C4)
- Jack and Jeremy's Real Lives (1996)
- Jam (2000)
- Jo Brand Through the Cakehole (1993–1996)
- Just Shoot Me! (US import)
- The Kevin Bishop Show (2008–2009)
- King Of... (2011)
- The King of Queens (US import)
- Kookyville (2012)
- The Lady is a Tramp (1983–1984)
- Law of the Playground (2006–2008)
- Lee and Dean (2018–2019)
- Let The Blood Run Free (import)
- Little Armadillos (1984)
- Living Apart Together (C4 film; on C4 1983)
- London Irish (2013)
- Los Dos Bros (pilot 1999; series 2001)
- Lovesick (formerly known as Scrotal Recall; series 1 on C4 2014, series 2 & 3 on Netflix)
- The Mad Bad Ad Show (2012)
- Make That Movie (2026)
- Man Down (2013–2017)
- Man to Man with Dean Learner (2006)
- Mann's Best Friends (1985)
- The Mary Tyler Moore Show (US import)
- The Mark Thomas Product (1996–2003)
- Mash and Peas (1996–1997)
- Max and Paddy's Road to Nowhere (2004)
- Meet the Magoons (2005)
- Mike & Molly (US import)
- The Mimic (2013–2014)
- Mitchell And Webb Are Not Helping (2025)
- Modern Toss (pilot 2005; series 2006–2008)
- Moesha (import)
- More Bad News (1988; part of The Comic Strip Presents...)
- The Morgana Show (2010)
- Mr Don & Mr George (1993)
- Mr. Jolly Lives Next Door (1988; part of The Comic Strip Presents... it had a limited theatrical release in 1987)
- The Munsters (US import; on C4 1982–)
- My Funniest Year (2010–2011)
- My Name Is Earl (US import)
- My New Best Friend (2003)
- Nathan Barley (2005)
- Never Mind the Horrocks (1996)
- New Hero of Comedy (2008)
- Nightingales (1990–1993)
- No Problem! (1983–1985)
- Norbert Smith: A Life (1989)
- The Norman Gunston Show (Australia import; on C4 1982–)
- On the Razzle (1983)
- The Optimist (1983–1985)
- Packet of Three (1991–1992; series 2 was titled Packing 'Em In)
- Paddy's TV Guide (2013)
- Paris (1994)
- The Paul Hogan Show (Australian import; on C4 1982–)
- Paul Merton: The Series (1991–1993)
- The People's Book of Records (2003)
- Peep Show (2003–2015)
- Penelope Princess of Pets (2010)
- Perfect Couples (US import)
- Pete versus Life (2010–2011)
- Pets (2001–2002)
- PhoneShop (2009–2013)
- Phoenix Nights (2001–2002)
- Plus One (2009)
- Porkpie (1995–1996)
- Porterhouse Blue (1987)
- Power Monkeys (2016)
- Prince Andrew: The Musical (2022)
- Prospects (1986)
- Pushers (2025)
- Raised by Wolves (pilot 2013; series 2015–2016)
- Ramy (US import; on C4 2026)
- Relative Strangers (1985–1987)
- Robert's Web (2010)
- Roseanne (US import)
- Russell Brand's Ponderland (2007)
- Saturday Live (1985–1988; comedy and music)
- Sean's Show (1992–1993)
- The Secret Policeman's Ball (2006)
- The Secret Policeman's Ball 2008
- The Secret Policeman's Ball 2012
- Set of Six (1990)
- Sex and the City (US import)
- Sirens (2011)
- Smack the Pony (1999–2003)
- Small Potatoes (1999–2001)
- Soap (US import; on C4 1983-)
- Space Cadets (1997)
- Spaced (1999–2001)
- Spoons (2005)
- Stand Up for the Week (2010–2013)
- Star Stories (2006–2008)
- Stath Lets Flats (2018-)
- Sticky Moments (1989–1990, satirical game show)
- The Strike (1988; part of The Comic Strip Presents...)
- Superfrank! (1987)
- The Supergrass (1988; Film4 production originally released in 1985)
- Takeover TV (1995–1996)
- Tandoori Nights (1985–1987)
- Taskmaster (2020-)
- Terry and Julian (1992)
- That Peter Kay Thing (2000)
- They Came from Somewhere Else (1984)
- This is David Lander (1988–1990)
- This Way Up (2019-)
- The Three Stooges (US import)
- Toast of London (pilot 2012; series 2013–2015)
- Tonightly (2008)
- Trigger Happy TV (2000–2003; 2016–2017)
- TV Offal (1997–1998)
- Twelfth Night (1988)
- Ugly Betty (US import)
- Very British Problems (2015–2016)
- Very Important People (2012)
- Vic Reeves Big Night Out (1990–1991)
- Vids (1999–2001)
- Was It Something I Said? (2013)
- Wayne and Shuster (Canada import; on C4 1983–)
- We Are Lady Parts (pilot 2018; series 2021)
- The Weekenders (1992)
- Who Dares Wins (1983–1988)
- Whose Line Is It Anyway? (1988–1999)
- Whose Line Is It Anyway? (US import)
- Will & Grace (US import)
- WKRP in Cincinnati (US import; on C4 1983)
- The Windsors (2016-)
- Wood and Walters (originally broadcast on ITV; on C4 1983)
- The World of Lee Evans (1995)
- Xerxes (Sweden import)
- Year of the Rabbit (2019)
- The Yob (1988; part of The Comic Strip Presents...)
- You Have Been Watching (2009–2010)
- The Young Person's Guide to Becoming a Rock Star (1998)

== Comedy drama ==
- Ackley Bridge (2017–2022)
- Ally McBeal (US import)
- As If (2001–2004)
- Babylon (2014)
- The Big One (1992)
- The Bisexual (2018)
- The Book Group (2002–2003)
- Cast Offs (2009)
- The Change (2023-)
- Confessions of Felix Krull: Confidence Man (Austria/France/West Germany import; on C4 1983)
- Crashing (2016)
- Dead Set (2009; originally broadcast on E4 in 2008)
- Derek (pilot 2012; series 2013–2014)
- Desperate Housewives (US import)
- The Draughtsman's Contract (C4 film; on C4 1983)
- Ed (US import)
- The End of the F***ing World (2017–2019)
- The Favourite (Film4 production; on C4 2022)
- Feel Good (2020–2021)
- Fresh Meat (2011–2016)
- Glee (US import)
- The Gravy Train (1990)
- The Gravy Train Goes East (1991)
- The Great (first broadcast on Hulu; on C4 2021-)
- Home (2019–2020)
- The Irish R.M. (1983–1985)
- Loaded (2017)
- Mapp & Lucia (1985–1986)
- Meantime (TV film; 1983)
- Metrosexuality (2001)
- Mr Pye (1986)
- No Angels (2004–2006)
- Not Safe for Work (2015)
- The Personal History of David Copperfield (Film4 Production; on C4 2022)
- Pure (2019)
- Ramy (US import; on C4 2021-)
- Red Monarch (TV film; 1983)
- Screw (2022–2023)
- Scully (1984)
- Shameless (2004–2013)
- Teenage Health Freak (1991–1993)
- Teachers (2001–2004)
- Totally Frank (2005–2006)
- Wedding Belles (TV film; 2007)
- Wittgenstein (C4 film; 1993)
- The Wonder Years (import)

== Drama ==
- 90210 (US import)
- A Dance to the Music of Time (1997)
- A Harlot's Progress (TV film; 2006)
- A Running Jump (short film; 2012)
- A Sense of Freedom (originally broadcast on ITV as part of ITV Playhouse; on C4 1983)
- A Very British Coup (1988)
- A Woman of Substance (1985)
- A Woman of Substance (2026 remake)
- The Accident (2019)
- Adult Material (2020)
- After the Party (New Zealand import; on C4 2024)
- Alfred Hitchcock Presents (US import; on C4 1983–)
- Alice & Jack (2024)
- Alice Through the Looking Glass (TV film; 1998)
- All the Sins (Finland import; on C4 2021–2023)
- And the Beat Goes On (1996)
- Andromeda (US import)
- Angel (C4 film; on C4 1983)
- Anna Karenina (2000)
- Anne of Green Gables: The Sequel (1987)
- Another Bouquet (originally broadcast on ITV; on C4 1983)
- Any Human Heart (2010)
- Arctic Circle (Finland-German import; on C4 2022)
- The Avengers (originally broadcast on ITV; on C4 1982-)
- Baghdad Central (2020)
- Becoming Elizabeth (on C4 2023)
- Behaving Badly (1989)
- Black Mirror (2011–2014)
- Blade on the Feather (originally broadcast on ITV as part of ITV Playhouse; on C4 1983)
- Boris Karloff Presents (US import; on C4 1983)
- Born to Kill (2017)
- Bouquet of Barbed Wire (originally broadcast on ITV; on C4 1983)
- Boy A (TV film; 2007)
- Brian and Maggie (2025)
- Brideshead Revisited (originally broadcast on ITV; on C4 1983)
- Britz (2007)
- Brond (1987)
- Brothers & Sisters (US import)
- Buried (2003)
- Camelot (US import)
- The Camomile Lawn (1992)
- Candy: A Death in Texas (US import; on C4 2025)
- The Cane Field Killings (South African import; on C4 2022)
- Cape Wrath (also known as Meadowlands; 2007)
- Centrepoint (1990)
- Charmed (US import)
- Chimerica (2019)
- City of Vice (2008)
- City Sugar (originally broadcast on ITV as part of ITV Playhouse; on C4 1983)
- Clapham Junction (TV film; 2007)
- Close to Me (2021)
- Closing Numbers (C4 film; 1993)
- Coalition (TV film; 2015)
- Cold Lazarus (co-production with BBC; 1996)
- The Comedian (US import that was part of Playhouse 90; on C4 1983–)
- Comics (1993)
- Coming Up (2003–2013)
- Complicit (TV film; 2013)
- Consent (2023)
- The Copenhagen Test (US import; on C4 2026)
- The Couple Next Door (2023–2025)
- The Courtroom (2004)
- Cream in My Coffee (originally broadcast on ITV as part of ITV Playhouse; on C4 1983)
- Cucumber (2015)
- Dates (2013)
- Day To Remember (TV play; 1986)
- Deadwater Fell (2020)
- The Deal (TV film; 2003)
- Dear Rosie (short film; 1991)
- Deceit (2021)
- The Devil's Whore (aka The Devil's Mistress in the US; 2008)
- Dirty Business (2026)
- Dockers (TV film; 1999)
- Dr. Death (US import; on C4 2023)
- Dubplate Drama (2005–2009)
- Edwin (1984)
- Electric Dreams (2017–2018)
- Elizabeth I (2005)
- The Endless Game (1989)
- England, My England (C4 film; 1995)
- ER (US import)
- Eurocops (pan-European co-production; 1988–1993)
- Experience Preferred... But Not Essential (TV film; 1982)
- The Execution of Gary Glitter (2009)
- Exterior Night (Italy import; TV series on C4 2023)
- The F Ward (Australia import; on C4 2026)
- Falling (2026)
- Fallout (TV film; 2008)
- Fargo (US import)
- The Fear (2012)
- Fellow Travelers (US import; on C4 2026)
- The First (2018)
- The Fool (Film Four production; 1990)
- Forever Young (TV film; 1983)
- The Fragile Heart (1996)
- G.B.H. (1991)
- The Gamekeeper (originally broadcast on ITV; on C4 1983)
- The Gathering (2024)
- Get Millie Black (2025)
- The Ghost Squad (2005)
- The Girl from Plainville (US import; on C4 2023)
- Giro City (C4 film 1982; also known as And Nothing But The Truth)
- God Rot Tunbridge Wells! (C4 film; 1985)
- Goldplated (2006)
- Good and Bad at Games (C4 film; 1983)
- The Good Wife (US import)
- Gossip from the Forest (originally broadcast on ITV as part of ITV Playhouse; on C4 1983)
- The Handmaid's Tale (US import)
- Hearts and Minds (1995)
- Help (TV film; 2021)
- Hero (C4 film; 1982)
- Hold the Dream (1986)
- Homeland (US import)
- Honour, Profit and Pleasure (TV film; 1985)
- Humans (2015–2018)
- Hunting Alice Bell (2026)
- I Am... (anthology; 2019-)
- Ike (US import; on C4 1983)
- In Flight (2025)
- Indian Summers (2015–2016)
- Innocents (TV film; 2000)
- It's a Sin (2021)
- Jack London's Tales of the Klondike (Canada import; on C4 1983)
- Karaoke (co-production with BBC; 1996)
- Killer Net (1998)
- Kiri (2018)
- Kiss Me First (2018)
- Labyrinth (German/South Africa import; on C4 2012)
- L.A. Law (US import)
- The Last Dragon (2005)
- Last Rights (2005)
- Laurence Olivier Presents King Lear (1983)
- The Life and Adventures of Nicholas Nickleby (1982)
- The Light in the Hall (2023)
- Lipstick on Your Collar (1993)
- Little Gloria... Happy at Last (US import; on C4 1983)
- Little Napoleons (1994)
- Lock, Stock... (2000)
- London's Burning (2011)
- The Lone Ranger (US import)
- Long Bright River (US import; on C4 2025)
- Longford (TV film; 2006)
- Longitude (2000)
- Lost (US import)
- Low Winter Sun (2006)
- Malu Mulher (Brazil import)
- The Manageress (1989–1990)
- The Mark of Cain (TV film; 2007)
- Marty (US import; part of The Philco Television Playhouse)
- Max Headroom: 20 Minutes into the Future (1985)
- Melissa (1997)
- The Mill (2013–2014)
- Moonlighting (C4 film; on C4 1983)
- More Tales of the City (1998)
- Mosley (1998)
- Naked City (US import; on C4 1983)
- Nashville (US import)
- National Treasure (2016)
- Nelly's Version (C4 film; on C4 1983)
- Never Never (2006)
- New Worlds (2014)
- Nip/Tuck (US import)
- Nine Perfect Strangers (US import; on C4 2022)
- No Offence (2015–2018)
- North Square (2000)
- Not Only But Always (TV film; 2004)
- NY-LON (2004)
- The O.C. (US import)
- One Summer (1983)
- One Tree Hill (US import)
- The Orchid House (1991)
- Out (originally broadcast on ITV; on C4 1983)
- Outlier (Norway import; on C4 2022)
- Oz (US import)
- P'tang, Yang, Kipperbang (TV film; 1982)
- Partygate (2023)
- Patience (2025-)
- Person of Interest (2024)
- Pierre (2026)
- Pleasureland (TV film; 2003)
- The Politician's Wife (1995)
- The Promise (2011)
- Psychos (1999)
- The Queen (2009)
- The Queen's Sister (TV film; 2005)
- Queenie (2024)
- Queer as Folk (1999–2000)
- Queer as Folk US (US import; on C4 2023)
- Rain on the Roof (originally broadcast on ITV as part of ITV Playhouse; on C4 1983)
- The Rector's Wife (1994)
- Red Riding (2009)
- The Relief of Belsen (TV film; 2007)
- Remembrance (C4 film; 1982)
- Rocks (Film4 production; on C4 2022)
- Run (2013)
- Say Nothing (US import; on C4 2025)
- The Secret Life of Us (Australia import)
- Secret Orchards (originally broadcast on ITV as part of ITV Playhouse; on C4 1983)
- Secret State (2012)
- The Serpent Queen (US import; on C4 2025)
- Sex Traffic (2004)
- Shackleton (2002)
- The Short and Curlies (TV short film; 1987)
- Smallville (US import)
- Somewhere Boy (2022)
- The Sopranos (US import; 1999–2010)
- Southcliffe (2013)
- Southland (US import)
- St. Elsewhere (US import; on C4 1983-)
- Stargate SG-1 (US import)
- Star Trek: Enterprise (US import; 2002–2005)
- The State (2017)
- Sugar Rush (2005–2006)
- Summerwater (2025)
- Sunday (TV film; 2002)
- Suspect (2022)
- Sword of Honour (TV film broadcast in 2 parts; 2001)
- The Taking of Prince Harry (2010)
- Tales of the City (1993)
- This Is England '86 (2010)
- This Is England '88 (2011)
- This Is England '90 (2015)
- Three Women (US import; on C4 2026)
- Tickets for the Titanic (1987–1988)
- Tip Toe (2026)
- Top Boy (2011–2013)
- Traffik (1989)
- Traitors (2019)
- Trespasses (2025)
- The Trial: A Murder in the Family (2017)
- Truelove (2024)
- Tusitala (1986)
- UKIP: The First 100 Days (2015)
- Ultraviolet (1998)
- The Undeclared War (2022, 2026)
- The Unloved (TV film; 2009)
- Upstairs, Downstairs (originally broadcast on ITV; on C4 1982-)
- Utopia (2013–2014)
- Vardy v Rooney: A Courtroom Drama (2022)
- The Veil (US import; on C4 2025)
- The Virtues (2019)
- Walter (TV film; 1982)
- Walter and June (TV film; 1983)
- What If It's Raining (1986)
- White Teeth (2012)
- Without a Trace (US import)
- The World Cup: A Captain's Tale (originally broadcast on ITV as part of ITV Playhouse; on C4 1983)
- The Year of the French (1983)
- Zastrozzi, A Romance (1986)

== Food ==
- The F Word (2005–2010)
- Food Unwrapped (2012–2025)
- Gok Cooks Chinese (2012)
- Gordon Ramsay: Uncharted (US import; 2021)
- Gordon Ramsay: Cookalong Live (2008, 2011, 2012)
- Gordon Ramsay's Home Cooking (2013)
- Gordon Ramsay's Ultimate Cookery Course (2012)
- Gordon's Great Escape (2010–2011)
- Heston's Fantastical Food (2012)
- Heston's Feasts (2009–2010, special 2011)
- Jamie & Jimmy's Friday Night Feast (2014–2021)
- Jamie at Home (2007–2008)
- Jamie's 15-Minute Meals (2012)
- Jamie's 30-Minute Meals (2010)
- Jamie's Comfort Food (2014)
- Jamie Does... (2010)
- Jamie's Kitchen (2002)
- Jamie's Meat-Free Meals (2019)
- Jamie's Quick & Easy Food (2017–2020)
- Jamie's School Dinners (2005)
- Jamie's Super Food (2014)
- Nigella Bites (1999–2001)
- River Cottage: Gone Fishing (2007)
- Snackmasters (2019-)
- The Spice of Life (1983)

== Game shows ==
- The £100K Drop (formally known as The Million Pound Drop; 2010–2015, 2018–2019)
- 1001 Things You Should Know (2012–2013)
- Alan Carr's Celebrity Ding Dong (2008)
- Back in the Day (2005)
- Baggage (2012)
- The Bank Job (2012)
- Benchmark (2015)
- Beat the Chef (2019)
- Celebrity Fifteen to One (1990–2015)
- Cheap Cheap Cheap (2017)
- Codex (2006–2007)
- The Common Denominator (2013)
- Countdown (C4's first broadcast programme; 1982-)
- The Crystal Maze (1990–1995, 2016, 2017–2020)
- Deal or No Deal (2005–2016)
- Distraction (2003–2004)
- Don't Quote Me (1990)
- Draw It! (2014)
- Face the Clock (2013)
- Five Minutes to a Fortune (2013)
- Fifteen to One (1988–2003, 2014–2019)
- Full Metal Challenge (2003)
- GamesMaster (1992–1998)
- I Literally Just Told You (2021–2024)
- Jeopardy (1983–1984)
- Last Chance Lottery (1997)
- Love in the Afternoon (1995–1996)
- Moneybags (2021)
- Naked Attraction (2016–2024)
- Naked Elvis (1999)
- Password (1982–1983)
- Perfect Match (2001–2003)
- PopMaster TV (2023-present)
- The Question Jury (2016–2017)
- Scrapheap Challenge (1998–2010)
- The Search (2007)
- Superstar Dogs: Countdown to Crufts (2014)
- Tell the Truth (1983–1985)
- Treasure Hunt (1982–1989)
- That'll Test 'Em (2006)
- Unanimous (2006)
- Wanted (1996–1997)
- Watercolour Challenge (1998–2001)
- Where in the World (1983–1985)
- Win It, Cook It (2014)
- Win My Wage (2007)
- Without Prejudice? (2003–2004)
- Wogan's Perfect Recall (2008–2010)
- X-Fire (2001–2002)
- Your Face or Mine? (2002–2003; originally broadcast on E4)

== Light entertainment, chat shows and illusion ==
- 100 Greatest (1999–2015)
- The 5 O'Clock Show (2010)
- 50 Greatest Magic Tricks (2002)
- Alan Carr: Chatty Man (2009–2016; Xmas special in 2017)
- Alan Carr's Happy Hour (2016)
- Alan Carr's Specstacular (2011–2017)
- An Audience with... (1983–1990)
- Baadasss TV (1994–1996)
- The Big Narstie Show (2018–2022)
- Bits (1999–2001)
- The Charlotte Church Show (2006–2008)
- Comic's Choice (2011)
- The Courtney Act Show (2018)
- Daily Brunch with Ocado (2014–2015)
- Derren Brown: The Events (2009)
- Don't Forget Your Toothbrush (1994–1995)
- Elephant Parts (US import; on C4 1983)
- Eurotrash (1993–2004, 2016)
- Everybody Loves Lil' Chris (2008)
- Experimental (2015)
- Fern (2011)
- The Friday Night Project (2005–2008)
- Frock Me (2008–2010)
- Get Knighted (1983)
- The Girlie Show (1996–1997)
- The Heist (2006)
- How to Be a Psychic Spy (2009)
- How to Control the Nation (2009)
- How to Take Down a Casino (also known as How to Beat a Casino, and How to Beat the Casino; 2009)
- Kazuko's Karaoke Klub (1988–1989)
- Kylie's Secret Night (2019)
- The Last Leg (2012-)
- The Last Resort with Jonathan Ross (1987–1988, 1997)
- Late Night Lycett (2023)
- The Lateish Show with Mo Gilligan (2019–2023)
- Light Lunch (1997–1999)
- Loose Talk (1983)
- Meet Ricky Gervais (2000)
- Messiah (2005)
- Moviewatch (1993–1998)
- The Oprah Winfrey Show (US import)
- The Paul O'Grady Show (2006–2009)
- Penn & Teller's Magic and Mystery Tour (2003)
- Pocket TV (originally broadcast on YouTube)
- The Real Football Fan Show (2018-)
- Richard & Judy (2001–2008)
- The Richard Blackwood Show (1999–2001)
- Rude Tube (2008–2015)
- The Russell Brand Show (2006)
- Saturday Zoo (1993)
- The Secret Cabaret (1990–1992)
- So Graham Norton (1998–2002)
- Steph's Packed Lunch (2020–2023)
- Sunday Brunch (2012-)
- The Sunday Night Project (2008–2009)
- TFI Friday (1996–2000, 2015)
- TFI Unplugged (2026)
- Thumb Bandits (2001–2002)
- Top Ten (1995–2002)
- Trick or Treat (2007–2008)
- TV Heaven, Telly Hell (2006–2007)
- The Unpleasant World of Penn & Teller (1994)
- V Graham Norton (2002–2003)
- Viva Cabaret (1993–1994)

== Music ==
- A Carnegie Hall Christmas Concert (US import)
- American Bandstand's 30th Anniversary Special (US import; on C4 1983)
- B4 (2004–2008)
- Being... N-Dubz (2010–2011; documentary)
- Big World Cafe (1989)
- The Chart Show (1986–1989, 2003)
- ECT (1985)
- Four to the Floor (2014–2015)
- Gastank (1982–1983)
- Girls Aloud: Off the Record (2006; reality series originally broadcast on E4)
- The Hip Hop Years (documentary; 1999)
- Hit40UK
- Karaoke Fishtank (2000–2001)
- Kylie's Golden Tour (2019)
- Live from Abbey Road (2007–2012)
- The Max Headroom Show (1985–1987)
- MOBO Awards (1998–2003)
- Music of the Millennium (1999)
- Network 7 (also current affairs; 1987–1988)
- The Nokia Green Room (2008-)
- Orange unsignedAct (2007–2009; originally named MobileAct unsigned)
- The Piano (2023-present)
- Popworld (2001–2007)
- Rock School (2005–2006)
- The Singer Takes It All (2014)
- Smash Hits Poll Winners Party (2001–2005)
- T4 on the Beach (2003–2012)
- Top C's and Tiaras (1982–1983)
- Transmission (2006–2007)
- The Tube (1982–1987)
- UK Music Hall of Fame (2004–2006)
- The Word (1990–1995)
- Your Song (2026)

== News, documentaries and current affairs ==
- 9/11 102 Minutes That Changed America (US import)
- 100% English (2006)
- 101 Things Removed from the Human Body (originally broadcast on Sky One; on C4 in 2004)
- 1066 The Battle for Middle Earth (2009)
- 15,000 Kids and Counting (2014)
- A Jihad for Love (C4 film; 2007)
- Africa (1984)
- After Dark (1987–1997)
- Airplaneski! (1995)
- Alien Investigations (2012)
- Alien Worlds (2005)
- All in the Best Possible Taste with Grayson Perry (2012)
- Alternative Christmas message (1993–)
- Americana (1992)
- An Impossible Job (part of the Cutting Edge series; 1994)
- Anatomy for Beginners (2005)
- Ancient Egyptians (2003–2004)
- The Ancient World (2002–2010)
- Ark on the Move (Canada import; on C4 1983–)
- The Autistic Gardener (2015–2017)
- The Awful Truth (1999–2000)
- The Beatles and India (2021; on C4 2022)
- Beauty and the Beast: Ugly Face of Prejudice (2011–2012)
- The Big Art Project (2009)
- Billy & Molly: An Otter Love Story (US import; on C4 2026)
- Black Box (1996–1998)
- Black on Black (1982–1985)
- Blind Young Things (part of the Cutting Edge series; 2007)
- Body Shock (2003–2014)
- Body Story (1998–2001)
- Born Survivor-Bear Grylls (aka Man vs. Wild; 2006–)
- Born to Be Different (2003–)
- Bowie: The Final Act (2025; on C4 2026)
- Bradley Walsh's Million Pound Shot (2026)
- Brave New World with Stephen Hawking (2011)
- Break the Science Barrier (1996)
- Britain at Low Tide (2016–2019)
- Britain's Ancient Tracks with Tony Robinson (2016–2017)
- Britain's Fattest Man (2011)
- Britain's Most Historic Towns (2018–2020)
- Britain's Real Monarch (2004)
- Business Daily (1987–1992)
- Cancer Wars (1998)
- Catastrophe (2008)
- Catching a Killer (2017–)
- Channel 4 News (1982–)
- Chasing a Rainbow: The Life of Josephine Baker (1986)
- Children of 9/11: Our Story (2021)
- The Children Who Cheated the Nazis (2000)
- The Churchills (2012)
- Civilization: Is the West History? (2011)
- Close Harmony (US import: on C4 1983)
- Coastal Railways with Julie Walters (2017)
- Cutting Edge (1990–)
- The Dark Side of Porn (2005–2006)
- David Baddiel: Jews Don't Count (2022)
- The Day the World Took Off (2000)
- Depp v. Heard (2023)
- Desperately Seeking Something (1995–1998)
- Disinformation (2000–2001)
- Dispatches (1987)
- DNA: The Story of Life (2003)
- The Dragon Has Two Tongues (1985; produced by HTV)
- Driven (1998–2002)
- Drugs Live (2012, 2015)
- The Enemies of Reason (2007)
- Engineering Announcements (1983–1990)
- Equinox (1986–2001)
- Eunuchs (2007)
- Extinct (2001)
- Extreme Male Beauty (2009)
- The First 48 (US import)
- First Cut (2007–)
- The First World War (2003)
- The Force (2009)
- Fortean TV (1997–1998)
- Frankie Boyle's Farewell to the Monarchy (2023)
- Frontline — America (US import; on C4 1983)
- Gadget Man (2012–2015; the first series was titled Stephen Fry: Gadget Man)
- Gay Muslims (2006)
- Gemma Collins: Self-Harm & Me (2022)
- Genius of Britain: The Scientists Who Changed the World (2010)
- The Genius of Charles Darwin (2008)
- George Clarke's Amazing Spaces (2012–)
- Ghislaine Maxwell: The Making of a Monster (2022)
- Globe Trekker (formerly known asLonely Planet; 1994–2016)
- Gnostics (1987)
- Gods in the Sky (2003)
- Going to Extremes (2001)
- Grayson Perry: All Man (2016)
- Great Canal Journeys (2014–2021)
- The Great Global Warming Swindle (2007)
- The Great Moghuls (1992)
- Greece: The Hidden War (1986)
- The Greenhouse Conspiracy (part of the Equinox series; 1990)
- Harlan County, USA (US import; on C4 1983)
- Heart of the Dragon (1984)
- Henry VIII: The Mind of a Tyrant (2009)
- History Hunters (1998–1999)
- Hitler's British Girl (2007)
- Hitler: The Lost Tapes (2022)
- Hollywood (originally broadcast on ITV; on C4 1983–)
- The Holy Family Album (1991)
- Home from Home (2001)
- How to Get a Council House (2013–2016)
- How Videogames Changed the World (2013)
- How We Used to Live (originally broadcast on Yorkshire TV)
- The Incredibly Strange Film Show (1988–1989)
- Inside Nature's Giants (2009–2012)
- Islam: The Untold Story (2012)
- Jesus: The Evidence (1984)
- Joe Lycett's Got Your Back (2019–)
- Joe Lycett vs the Oil Giant (2021)
- John Peel's Record Box (2005)
- Jon Richardson Grows Up (2014)
- Jonathan Ross Presents for One Week Only (1990)
- Karachi Kops (1994)
- Leaving Neverland (2019)
- Leaving Neverland 2: Surviving Michael Jackson (2025)
- Make Bradford British (2012)
- Make Me a Tory (2007)
- Man on Earth (2009)
- Michael Moore Live (1999)
- Monarchy (2004–2007)
- Mondo Macabro (2002)
- Munich: Mossad's Revenge (2006)
- My Grandparents' War (2019)
- My Son the Jihadi (2015)
- My Transsexual Summer (2011)
- No Fire Zone: In the Killing Fields of Sri Lanka (2013)
- No Going Back (2002)
- Not Forgotten (2005–2009)
- One Born Every Minute (2010–2018)
- Only Human (2005–2007)
- Opinions (1982–1994)
- Paul Merton's Secret Stations (2016)
- Paul Robeson: Tribute to an Artist (US import; on C4 1983)
- Paula (2023)
- The Perfect Home (2006)
- Picasso: Magic, Sex & Death (2001)
- The Plane Crash (2012)
- Rescue (1996)
- Right to Reply (1982–2001)
- The Root of All Evil? (aka The God Delusion; 2006)
- Rosie Jones: Am I a R*tard? (2023)
- Saving Africa's Witch Children (part of the Dispatches series; 2008)
- Secret History (1991–2004, 2013–2019)
- The Secret Life of Machines (1988–1993)
- The Secret Rulers of the World (2001)
- Secrets of the Super Psychics (1997)
- Seven Ages of Britain (2003)
- Sex, Death and the Meaning of Life (2012)
- The Sex Education Show (20082011)
- The Shadow Scholars: Fake Essay Scandal (2024; on C4 2025)
- Shariah TV (2004–2008)
- The Sinking of the Concordia: Caught on Camera (2012)
- Sir Alex Ferguson: Never Give In (first broadcast on Prime Video; on C4 2022)
- The Six Wives of Henry VIII (2001)
- Spacey Unmasked (2024)
- The Spartans (2002; part of The Ancient World series)
- Speed with Guy Martin (2013–)
- Spice Girls: How Girl Power Changed Britain (2021)
- Spirituality Shopper (2005)
- The Spy Machine (1998)
- Sri Lanka's Killing Fields (2011)
- Sri Lanka's Killing Fields: War Crimes Unpunished (2012)
- Station X (1999)
- Stephen Hawking: Master of the Universe (2008)
- The Stranger on the Bridge (2015)
- Surviving Extremes (2003)
- Terror at Sea: The Sinking of the Costa Concordia (2012)
- Terror in the Skies (2013)
- Time Signs (1991)
- Time Team (1994–2014)
- Time Team Digs (2002)
- Time Team Extra (1998)
- Time Team Live (1997–2006)
- Tony Robinson's Crime and Punishment (2008)
- Tony Robinson's Romans (2003)
- Town Bloody Hall (US import; on C4 1983)
- Travel Man (2015–)
- Trip Hazard: My Great British Adventure (2021)
- The Trouble with Atheism (2006)
- UK Late (1987)
- Undercover Mosque (part of the Dispatches series; 2007)
- Undercover Mosque (part of the Dispatches series; 2007)
- Unreported World (2000–)
- Vietnam (1983)
- Vietnam: The Ten Thousand Day War (Canada import; on C4 1984–1985)
- Walking Through History (2013–2014)
- We Need to Talk about Dad (2011; part of the Cutting Edge series)
- Weapons That Made Britain (2004)
- What the Papers Say (1982–1988)
- When Björk Met Attenborough (2013)
- When Boris Met Dave (2009; originally broadcast on More4)
- When Steptoe Met Son (2002)
- When the Moors Ruled in Europe (2005; part of The Ancient World series)
- Whites Only: Ade's Extremist Adventure (2024)
- Why Men Don't Iron (1998)
- Willie's Wonky Chocolate Factory (2008)
- The World of Hammer (1994)
- World of Weird (pilot 2015; series 2016)
- The Worst Jobs in History (2004–2006)
- The Worst of Hollywood (1983)
- Wreck Detectives (2003–2004)
- X-Rated: The Pop Videos They Tried to Ban (2004)
- X-Rated: The TV They Tried to Ban (2005)
- Young, Nazi and Proud (2002)

== Reality TV ==
- 10 Years Younger (2004–2010)
- The 1900 House (1999–2000)
- The 1940s House (2001)
- 24 Hours in A&E (2011-)
- 24 Hours in Police Custody (2014-)
- 999: What's Your Emergency? (2012-)
- A Granny's Guide to the Modern World (2016)
- Alone (UK version; 2023)
- American Pickers (US import; on C4 2025)
- A Place in the Sun (2000-)
- Bake Off: The Professionals (aka Bake Off: The Créme de la Créme; 2016-)
- Bald! (2003)
- Bank of Dave (2012)
- Beauty and the Geek (2006; originally broadcast on E4)
- Bedlam (2013)
- Bedsitcom (2003)
- Benefits Street (2014–2015)
- Beyond River Cottage (2004)
- Big Ballet (2014)
- Big Brother (2000–2010)
- Big Brother Panto (2004–2005)
- Big Fat Gypsy Weddings (2010–2015)
- Billion Dollar Cruise (2020)
- Bodyshockers (2014-)
- Boiling Point (1999)
- Boys and Girls Alone (2009)
- Brat Camp (2005–2007)
- Brendan's Magical Mystery Tour (2013)
- Bringing Up Baby (2007)
- Building the Dream (2013-; originally broadcast on More4)
- California Dreaming (2005)
- Car SOS (originally broadcast on National Geographic; 2013-)
- Celebrity Big Brother (2001–2010)
- The Celebrity Circle (2021)
- Celebrity Five Go to... (2011–2012)
- Celebrity Hunted (2017-)
- Celebrity Island with Bear Grylls (2016–2019)
- Changing Rooms (2021)
- Chateau DIY (2018-)
- Child Genius (2013-)
- The Circle (2018–2021)
- The City Gardener (2003–2005)
- Coach Trip (2005–2022)
- Coast vs Country (2016-)
- Collector's Lot (1997–2001)
- College Girls (2002)
- Colonial House (2004; US/UK co-production)
- Come Date with Me (2011–2012)
- Come Dine with Me (2005-)
- The Convention Crasher (2007–2008)
- Coppers (2010–2012)
- Country House Rescue (2008–2012)
- Crazy Delicious (2020)
- Crime Team (pilot 2001; series 2002)
- Davina McCall's Language of Love (2022)
- Deadliest Catch (US import)
- Deadline (1995)
- Demolition (2005)
- Dirty Sexy Things (2011)
- The Dog House (2019-)
- Dolce Vito – Dream Restaurant (2009)
- Don't Make Me Angry (2005–2006)
- Dumped (2007)
- Eden (2002; set in Australia)
- Eden (2016–2017; set in Scotland)
- Educating... (2011–2020)
- Educating Cardiff (2015)
- Educating Essex (2011)
- Educating Greater Manchester (2017)
- Educating Greater Manchester 2 (2020)
- Educating the East End (2014)
- Educating Yorkshire (2013–2014, 2025)
- The Edwardian Country House (2002)
- Embarrassing Bodies (2007–2015)
- Escape to River Cottage (1999)
- Escape to the Chateau (2016-)
- Escape to the Chateau DIY (2018-)
- Escape to the Wild (originally titled Kevin McCloud's Escape to the Wild; 2015–2017)
- Extraordinary Extensions (2021-)
- Extreme A&E (2012)
- Extreme Celebrity Detox (2005)
- Extreme Dreams with Ben Fogle (2006–2009)
- The Family (2008–2010)
- Faking It (2000–2006)
- Fame Asylum (2006)
- Famous and Fearless (2011)
- Find Me a Family (2009)
- First Dates (2013-)
- For the Love of Cars (2014–2016)
- Four in a Bed (aka Three in a Bed; 2010-)
- Four Rooms (2011–2019)
- The F***ing Fulfords (2004)
- Game of Wool: Britain's Best Knitter (2025)
- The Games (2003–2006)
- Get Your Act Together with Harvey Goldsmith (2007)
- Gogglebox (2013-)
- Gordon Behind Bars (2012)
- Gordon Ramsay's Secret Service (US import; on C4 2026)
- Grand Designs (1999-)
- Grayson's Art Club (2020–2021)
- The Great British Bake Off (2017-)
- The Great British Bake Off: An Extra Slice (2017-)
- The Great British Dig (2020–2023)
- The Great Pottery Throw Down (2021-)
- Gypsy Rose: Life After Lock Up (US import; on C4 2025-2026)
- Handmade: Britain's Best Woodworker (2021-2023)
- Help! My House is Falling Down (2010-)
- Hidden Talent (2012)
- The Hoarder Next Door (2012–2014)
- The Hotel (2011–2015)
- Hotel GB (2012)
- House Auction (2005-)
- House Guest (2008)
- The House of Obsessive Compulsives (2005)
- How Clean Is Your House? (2003–2009)
- How the Other Half Live (2009–2010)
- How to Look Good Naked (2006–2011)
- Hugh's Chicken Run (2008)
- Hunted (2015-)
- Immigration Street (2015)
- Indian Summer School (2018)
- The Island with Bear Grylls (2014–2019)
- Iron Chef UK (2010)
- It's Me or the Dog (2005–2008)
- Jamie's American Food Revolution (US import)
- Jamie's Dream School (2011)
- Jamie's Ministry of Food (2008)
- Jo Frost: Extreme Parental Guidance (2010–2012)
- The Jump (2014–2017)
- The Jury: Murder Trial (2024–2026)
- Katie Price's Mucky Mansion (2022-2023)
- Kevin McCloud's Man Made Home (2012–2013)
- Kings of Comedy (2004)
- Kirstie and Phil's Love It or List It (2015-)
- The Language of Love (2022)
- Lego Masters (2017–2018)
- Location, Location, Location (2000-)
- Lost (2001)
- Make Me Prime Minister (2022)
- Made in Chelsea (originally broadcast on E4)
- Man Vs Weird (2014)
- Married at First Sight (2015-)
- Masters and Servants (2003)
- Miss Naked Beauty (2008)
- Model Behaviour (2001–2002)
- Mr Drew's School for Boys (2014)
- Musicool (2007)
- Obsessive Compulsive Cleaners (2013–2016)
- Orchestra United (2010)
- The Osbournes (US import)
- Our Man in... (2012)
- Our Welsh Chapel Dream (2024-)
- Passengers (1995-)
- The People's Parliament (pilot 1993; series 1994–1997)
- The People's Supermarket (2011)
- Pet Rescue (1997–2003)
- Phil Spencer: Secret Agent (2012-)
- Picture This (2001)
- Playing it Straight (2005; 2012)
- Princess Nikki (originally broadcast on E4; 2006)
- Property Ladder (2001–2009)
- Ramsay's 24 Hours to Hell and Back (US import)
- Ramsay's Best Restaurant (2010)
- Ramsay's Hotel Hell (US import)
- Ramsay's Kitchen Nightmares (2004–2014)
- Ramsay's Kitchen Nightmares USA (US import)
- The Real Housewives of New Jersey (US import)
- Regency House Party (2004)
- The Restoration Man (2010-)
- Rise and Fall (2023-)
- River Cottage Forever (2002)
- River Cottage Spring (2008)
- Return to River Cottage (2000)
- Relocation Relocation (2004–2011)
- Ruth Watson's Hotel Rescue (2009)
- The Salon (2003–2004)
- Sarah Beeny's New Life in the Country (2020-)
- SAS: Who Dares Wins (2015-)
- Scared of the Dark (2023)
- Secret Eaters (2012–2014)
- The Secret Life of the Zoo (2016-)
- Secret Lives of Gypsy Wives (2026)
- The Secret Millionaire (2006–2012)
- Seven Dwarves (2011)
- Sex Box (2013–2016)
- The Sex Inspectors (2004–2007)
- Shattered (2004)
- Shipwrecked (1999–2001, 2006–2009)
- Skint (2013–2015)
- The Simple Life (US import)
- Space Cadets (2005)
- Steph and Dom's One Star to Five Star (2017)
- Streetmate (1998–2001, 2017)
- The Supervet: Noel Fitzpatrick (2014-)
- Supernanny (2004–2008)
- Supersize vs Superskinny (2008–2014)
- The Taste (2014)
- Teen Big Brother: The Experiment (2003)
- Tempting Fortune (2023-)
- That'll Teach 'Em (2003–2006)
- Time Crashers (2015)
- Tower Block of Commons (2010)
- The Tribe (2015)
- Ultimate Big Brother (2010)
- The Undateables (2012-)
- Undercover Boss (2009–2014)
- Undercover Boss Canada (Canada import)
- Undercover Boss USA (US import)
- The Unique Boutique (2023)
- Virgin Island (2025-)
- Wakey Wakey Campers (2005)
- What the Butler Saw (2004)
- Wife Swap (2003–2009; 2017 special)
- Yeardot (2008–2009)
- You Are What You Eat (2004–2007)

== Soaps ==
- Brookside (1982–2003)
- Damon and Debbie (1987)
- Family Pride (1991–1992)
- Hollyoaks (1995-)
- Springhill (1996–1997)

== Sport ==
- 2012 Summer Paralympics
- 2014 Winter Paralympics
- 2016 Summer Paralympics
- 2017 BDO World Darts Championship
- 2017 World Para Athletics Championship
- 2018 Winter Paralympics
- 2020 Summer Paralympics
- 2022 Winter Paralympics
- 2024 Summer Paralympics
- 2025 Africa Cup of Nations
- The Boat Race (2026-)
- Channel 4 F1 (2016-)
- Channel 4 Racing (1984–2016)
- England cricket tour of India in 2020–21
- European Poker Tour
- The Fanbanta Football Show (2007)
- Football Italia (1992–2002)
- Formula E (2022-)
- Formula E Unplugged (2023-)
- Late Night Poker (1999–2002, 2008–2011)
- Mobil 1 The Grid (2009-)
- The Morning Line (1984–2016)
- Tour de France
- TCR UK (2022-)
- Trans World Sport (1987-)
- Under the Moon (1996)
- WWE Heat (US import)

== Miscellaneous ==
- 3 Minute Wonder (2006)
- 4Learning
- 4thought.tv (2010–2013)
- Adult at 14 season (2003)
- Channel 4 Banned season (1991; 2004–2005)
- Club X (arts programme; 1989)
- Crufts (international dog show; 2010-)
- extra (2002–2004; educational sitcom)
- National Comedy Awards (2011–2014, 2022-)
- Red triangle (1986–1987)
- Stand Up to Cancer (charitable telethon; 2012-)
- T4 (1998–2012)
- The Trip (1999)
- TV Heaven (1992)

== Notes ==
- Shows with "import" beside the name have not been directly commissioned by Channel 4 and have been imported from broadcasters in countries outside the United Kingdom.
