= California Dreamin' (disambiguation) =

"California Dreamin'" is a song by The Mamas & the Papas.

California Dreamin' or similar may also refer to:

- The California Dream of sudden wealth and fame

== Film ==
- California Dreamin' (film), a 2007 Romanian film
- California Dreaming (1979 film), a 1979 film starring Glynnis O'Connor, Dennis Christopher and Tanya Roberts

== Television ==
- California Dreamin' (All the Cleves are Brown), an episode of The Cleveland Show.
- California Dreaming (TV series), a British reality television programme
- California Dreams, American TV situation comedy

== Music ==
- California Dreamin' (Bud Shank album), a 1966 jazz album by Bud Shank
- California Dreaming (Wes Montgomery album), a 1966 jazz album by guitarist Wes Montgomery
- California Dreaming (Rick Price and Jack Jones album), a 2017 album by Australian musicians Rick Price and Jack Jones
- "California Dreaming", a song by Hollywood Undead from the 2017 album Five
- California Dreams Tour, a concert tour by Katy Perry

== Other ==
- California Dreaming (novel), a 2008 novel by Zoey Dean
- California Screamin’, now known as Incredicoaster, a roller coaster at Disney California Adventure Park in Anaheim, California
