= Lip sync (disambiguation) =

Lip sync, also lip-sync, lip-synch and short for lip synchronization is a technical term for matching lip movements with pre-recorded sung or spoken vocals

Lip sync may also refer to:

- Lip Sync Battle, American musical reality competition television program which spawned several international versions
- Lip sync error in audio to video synchronization
- Lip Synch (series), series of 5 short films which used vox pops as inspiration for their subject matter

== See also ==
- Lipps Inc. (pronounced like "lip sync"), American R&B/Funk/Disco band from Minneapolis, Minnesota, USA
