= California Dream =

Abstraction of California as a land of opportunity

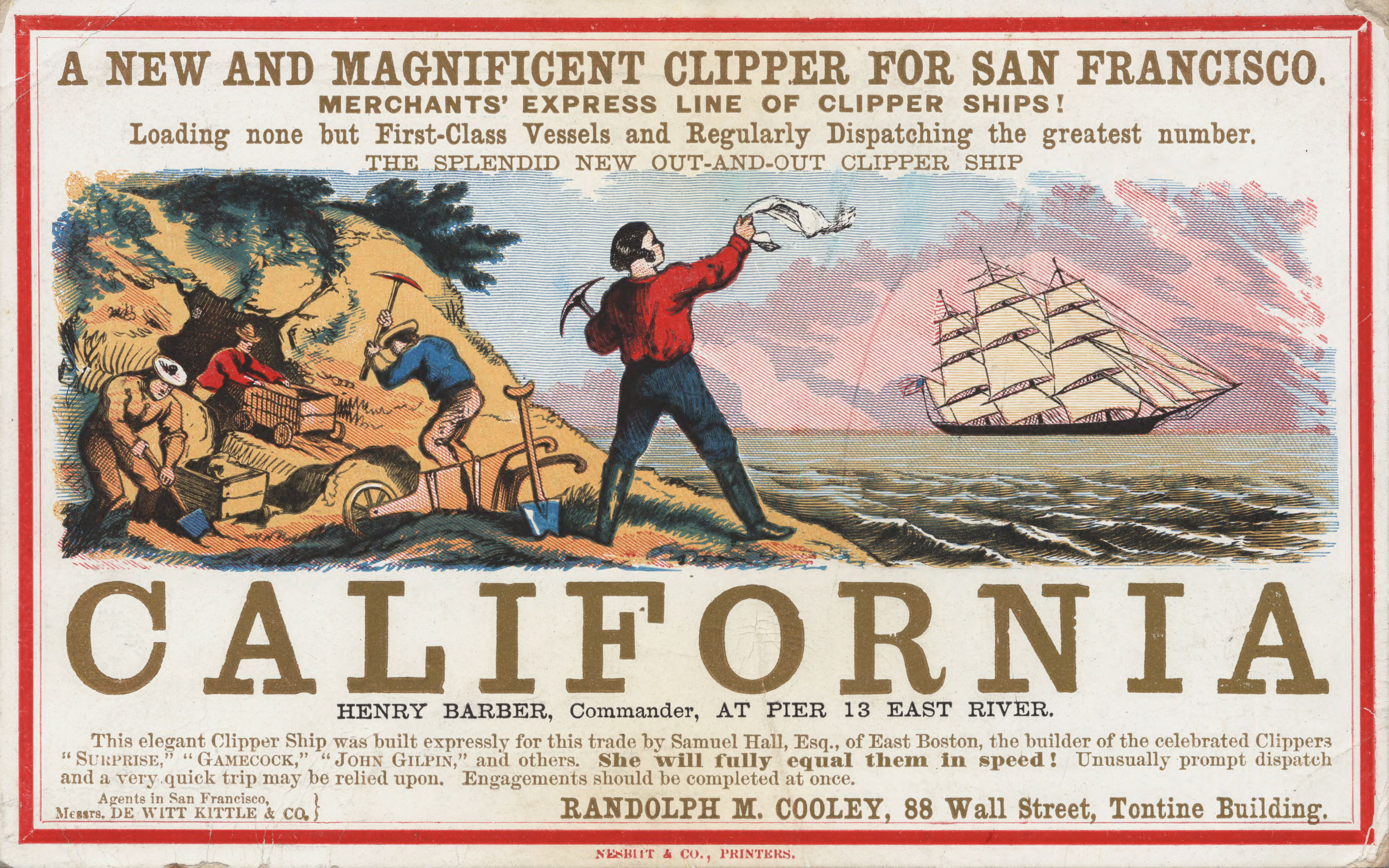
This advertisement promotes clipper ship passage from Hoboken, New Jersey to San Francisco, California. It depicts gold miners hard at work - one of them waves at a clipper ship as it sails past them.

The California Dream is the belief in one's capacity to gain wealth or fame in a new land, namely the American state of California. Within California, the Dream has been used to evoke the concept of a state-wide ethos and purpose, especially in relation to the broader concept of the American Dream. California's history, location, and diverse economy have contributed to the Dream. Diverse perspectives have led to its use in rhetoric to both promote California and to criticize the policies of the state government in Sacramento.

Some argue that, as a result of the California gold rush after 1849, California's name became indelibly connected with image of an average man travelling to strike rich mining gold. According to this theory, the belief in rapid success after moving to a new area became known as the "California Dream". Others claim the concept did not emerge until the 1960s. Regardless of its specific origins, California came to be perceived as a place of new beginnings, where hard work and good luck would be rewarded by fame and fortune. California came to be seen as a lucky place, a land of opportunity and wealth. It was and is a powerful belief, as it draws from many of the state's accomplishments and promotes a sense of unity in the state's residents. Strong emotions tend to be raised when the Dream is threatened.

The old American Dream . . . was the dream of the Puritans, of Benjamin Franklin's "Poor Richard" . . . of men and women content to accumulate their modest fortunes a little at a time, year by year by year. The new dream was the dream of instant wealth, won in a twinkling by audacity and good luck. [This] golden dream . . . became a prominent part of the American psyche only after Sutter's Mill.

Overnight, California gained the international reputation as "The Golden State". In 1968, this became California's official nickname.

== Migrants ==
Generations of immigrants have been attracted by the California Dream. Farmers, oil drillers, filmmakers, aerospace corporations and tech entrepreneurs have each had economic booms in California after the Gold Rush had ended.

Part of the "California Dream" was "that every family could have its own private home."

As historian Kevin Starr has pointed out, for many if not most migrants to the "Golden State", reality did not reflect the ideals of the California Dream. The Okies of the 1930s migrated to California to escape the ecological devastation of the Dust Bowl, and despite their California Dream, were faced with poverty, even on the West Coast, according to Walter Stein. Claudia Jurmain, in her 1986 book, "California: a place, a people, a dream", claims that the California Dream was a "a love affair with an idea, a marriage to a myth."

Other immigrants attest to feeling helpless as most are not allowed to have a job due to not having papers.

== Psychology ==
Observers often report that people are happier in California. Often cited is the commonly pleasant and warm Californian climate, in fact Californians will often report higher satisfaction with their climate than Americans in the Midwest, with much of California enjoying a Mediterranean climate. A 1998 survey of students suggested that self-reported overall life satisfaction of those who lived in California was not significantly higher than those who lived elsewhere.

== 20th century ==
Historian Kevin Starr in his seven-volume history of the state has explored in great depth the "California Dream"—the realization by ordinary Californians of the American Dream. Beginning in the late 19th century, California promised the highest possible standard of life for the middle class, and indeed for skilled blue collar workers and farm owners. Poverty existed, but was concentrated in camps of migrant farm workers, as made famous in John Steinbeck's 1939 novel, The Grapes of Wrath, where the Joad family, driven out of Oklahoma by the Dust Bowl, searches in vain for the California Dream in the southern Central Valley.

By the 1950s, more "Okies" and "Arkies" (migrants from Oklahoma and Arkansas) were settling in California and improving their living conditions. While the American upper class preferred to live in New York and Boston. The California Dream attracted families seeking an improved and affordable family life. It also offered employment opportunities, excellent roads, facilities for outdoor recreation, and schools and universities that had achieved worldwide acclaim by the 1940s.

James M. Cain, an eastern writer who visited California, reported in 1933 that the archetypal Californian "addresses you in easy grammar, completes his sentences, shows familiarity with good manners, and in addition gives you a pleasant smile."

Cultural phenomena which have fed into the California Dream include the rise of the film industry in Hollywood, Silicon Valley, California's aerospace industry, the California wine industry and the Dotcom boom. The phrase has been used to describe Californians' struggles to find a suitable location in the state to achieve success, in 2017, when the cost of living in places like the San Francisco Bay Area were prohibitive.

=== 21st Century ===
In the twenty-first century, evidence about the belief in the California Dream is mixed, with increasing data suggesting that some Californians doubt the validity of the Dream. According to a 2018 report by the California Dream project published by the nonprofit media collective CalMatters, Californians surveyed about their well-being were pessimistic about chances for the younger generation. The cost of living has increased while incomes have not kept up. Taking the cost of living into account, California’s poverty rate is the worst in the United States. The cost of housing is especially challenging, with home prices reaching approximately 700% of annual average family income. The cost of higher education is higher but state financial support for students has dropped. On the other hand, the same survey indicated that Californians still prefer their own state to others, suggesting that some aspects of the California Dream might survive.

The same mixed trend is reflected in a study in 2021 by researchers at UC San Diego, which found that contrary to many reports in the news media, there is not an overall increase in the number of Californians planning to move out of the state. However, a higher proportion of residents living in the Central Valley and Northern California plan to leave California compared to residents of Southern California and the San Francisco Bay Area, indicating some geographical disparities in confidence about the California Dream. Overall, the percentage of people who consider California to be a better place to live than other states declined to less than half, compared to over half in 2000 and more than two-thirds in the 1980s. Yet when asked if they still believe in the California Dream, over 60% of survey respondents still said yes.

Pessimism about the California Dream is also reflected in a survey taken in 2023 by the Public Policy Institute of California, which asked respondents if they believed that the American Dream was easier to reach in California compared to other states, and where over 60% disagreed. When asked if the American Dream was ever true, 15% of respondents said no, and over 50% said it existed in the past but is not valid now.

== Popular culture ==
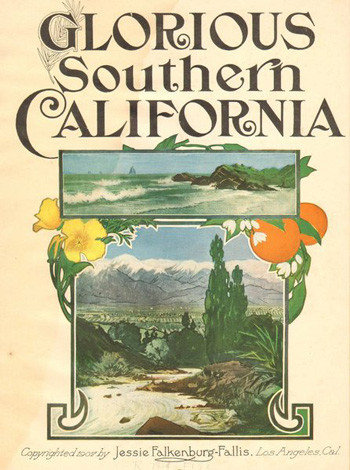
1907 sheet music for Glorious Southern California

The term has been referenced in numerous media, most notably in the 1963 song "California Dreamin'". The song is written from the perspective of a Californian who longs to return to the warmth and safety of their home state while spending the winter out of state. The most popular version of the song was released as a single by The Mamas & the Papas in 1965.

"California dreaming" has been used in books, films, and other pieces of art that reference some aspect of the California Dream, such as the 2007 film California Dreaming, and the 2005 UK reality TV series California Dreaming. Lawrence Donegan's California Dreaming: A Smooth-running, Low-mileage, Cut-price American Adventure references the California and American Dreams. Poet Christopher Buckley referenced it in Sleepwalk: California dreamin' and a last dance with the '60s. Numerous songs have been written about the California Dream.

The ubiquity of the song "California Dreamin'" as a Californian cultural signifier has been used to evoke an emotional connection to the state and people of California. For the 2015 film San Andreas, singer songwriter Sia recorded an orchestral version that was used during a montage as a massive earthquake destroys many landmarks across California, transforming the song into a lament about grief and catastrophe.

== See also ==
- Bibliography of California history
- Blue Sky Dream: A Memoir of America's Fall from Grace, related memoir on the California aerospace industry and associated culture
- California Dreamin' (disambiguation)
- History of California
- Californication, the complete opposite of the California Dream
