= Love in the Afternoon =

Love in the Afternoon may refer to:

- Love in the Afternoon (1957 film), directed by Billy Wilder
- Love in the Afternoon (1972 film), directed by Éric Rohmer
- Love in the Afternoon (advertising campaign), a slogan and campaign used by ABC from 1975 to 1985 to market its daytime lineup
- Love in the Afternoon, a 2010 novel by Lisa Kleypas
- Love in the Afternoon (TV series)
- Love in the Afternoon (short film), short film starring Ben Turner
