= Master and servant =

Master and servant describes a hierarchical relationship between an employer and a worker.

Master and servant or masters and servants may also refer to:

- Master and Servant Act, legal statutes in the United Kingdom in the 18th and 19th centuries
- Master and Servant Act 1889, repeal some UK laws and regulations
- Parable of the Master and Servant, morality story found in the Christian Gospels (specifically, Luke Chapter 17)
- Master and Servant (1979), novel by Kenyan writer David Mulwa
- "Master and Servant" (1984), a Depeche Mode song
- Masters and Servants, reality television show by RDF Media
- Respondeat superior, legal doctrine relating to an employer's liability for acts of his employees
