= Experimental (TV series) =

Television series

- Also known as: Man v Viral
- Genre: Factual television
- Developed by: John Farrar and Jago Lee
- Written by: Stephen Shearman, Martin Morrison, Tim Shaw
- Directed by: Stephen Shearman
- Presented by: Tim Shaw; Buddy Munro
- Narrated by: Nick Ellsworth
- Country of origin: United Kingdom
- No. of seasons: 1
- No. of episodes: 6

Production
- Executive producers: Sarah Ramsden, Ed Sayer
- Producers: Stephen Shearman (Series): Sarah Barber; Lydia Delmonte; Natasha Neeson; Dominic Rees-Roberts; Balnek Sangra; Victoria Weaver
- Production locations: England; Tbilisi, Georgia; Poland Munich, Germany
- Cinematography: Ossian Bacon
- Editors: Nico Bee (Series); Christopher Brown; Billy Martin; James Reed; Liam Camps; Martin Morrison (Series Edit Producer); Jim Reynolds
- Camera setup: Sony F55, Sony FS7, Sony A7S
- Running time: 60 minutes (with adverts)

Original release
- Network: Channel 4, National Geographic Channel
- Release: 26 July – 3 November 2015

Experimental is a British factual television series produced by NERD and aired on Channel 4 in 2015. The show, created and presented by Tim Shaw and featuring Buddy Munro, attempts to recreated various viral videos in an effort to prove their validity.

Series Produced and Directed by Stephen Shearman.

== Experiments ==
The show features a variety of experiments including:

- Can you play tennis on the wings of an aircraft?
- A cola Geyser with 1,000 L (260 US gal; 220 imp gal) of cola and 7000 Mentos
- Can you lift a person off the ground with fire hoses?
- Can you scale a wall with only vacuum cleaners?

== Episodes ==
Episode	Description	Airdate
1	Presenter Tim Shaw and daredevil friend Buddy Munro travel the globe to recreate some of the most famous – and dangerous – viral videos to have ever appeared on the internet, hoping to uncover the scientific truth behind them in the process. In the first episode, Tim tries to remake a video of Wimbledon champion Novak Djokovic playing tennis on the wings of a flying aircraft, travelling to Germany to see if they can achieve the same on an Antonov An-2. Strapped to the wings, Buddy challenges a professional air-acrobat to a rally hundreds of metres above the German countryside. The pair also drop 7,000 mint sweets into 1,000 litres of cola, and Buddy tries an unusual fireman's lift in Whitehaven, Cumbria – being elevated on a platform by just the force of fire engine water hoses.	26 July 2015
2	Buddy Munro goes flying off a ramp using an engine-powered glider, and also uses jet propulsion to ski uphill on a trip to the Czech Republic's Krkonose Mountains. Tim Shaw checks out videos of people trying to do the splits in mid-air and finds out what this does to the human body, and tries out various gadgets to build a working hover-board.	2 August 2015
3	Tim Shaw and Buddy Munro experiment with water skiing behind a hydrofoil ferry, and trying to avoid the vessel's dangerously large wake. They meet the star of an internet video who filmed himself holding onto a high pressure hose. In Munich the duo explore the game of Racing the Tube – getting off an underground train and trying to beat it to the next station.	9 August 2015
4	Tim Shaw and Buddy Munro go to the Caucasus Mountains in Georgia, and try riding down the slopes on a shovel. Tim also builds a football-firing air cannon to recreate an incident where a ball was fired from a coach, and rebounded back to be caught by one of its passengers. The duo watch a video of an unusual firework in a Thai religious festival, and build a giant rocket out of bamboo.	16 August 2015
5	Tim Shaw builds a giant catapult to fire Buddy out of, and draws inspiration from clips of people propelling swivel chairs around the room with leaf blowers to create a low-friction version with two engines. The duo heads for Georgia to carry out a dangerous stunt testing the science of acceleration. Buddy is challenged to make the longest possible free fall from a tower block – but is reluctant to go through with it.	23 August 2015
6	Tim builds a vacuum-powered climbing kit and challenges Buddy to scale the walls of an underground theatre. The duo examine clips of a skier riding down Britain's longest escalator and people rolling down hills in tractor tyres, and also find out about the effects of g on fighter pilots by attaching a moped to a children's roundabout.	3 November 2015
