= Next (1990 film) =

- Directed by: Barry Purves
- Written by: Barry Purves
- Based on: Plays of William Shakespeare
- Produced by: Sara Mullock
- Cinematography: Dave Alex Riddett; David Sproxton
- Edited by: Helen Garrard; David McCormick
- Music by: Stuart Gordon; The Hautboys
- Production company: Aardman Animations
- Release date: 28 November 1990 (UK)
- Running time: 5 min
- Country: United Kingdom
- Language: English

Next is a short film created by Aardman Animations. Its full title is "Next: The Infinite Variety Show".

== Plot ==
William Shakespeare auditions for an undetermined role in front of a bored Peter Hall with references to his play in under five minutes.

== Plays present ==
- "Henry V"
- "Julius Caesar"
- "Antony and Cleopatra"
- "Coriolanus"
- "Henry VIII"
- "Romeo & Juliet"
- "Henry IV"
- "Richard II"
- "Henry VI"
- "Richard III"
- "Troilus & Cressida"
- "A Midsummer Night’s Dream"
- "Hamlet"
- "Othello"
- "Titus Andronicus"
- "Timon of Athens"
- "The Tempest"
- "As You Like It"
- "Macbeth"
- "Alls Well Ends Well"
- "The Taming Of The Shrew"
- "Much Ado About Nothing"
- "The Merry Wives Of Windsor"
- "The Merchant Of Venice"
- "King John"
- "Pericles, Prince Of Tyre"
- "King Lear"
- "Love’s Labour’s Lost"
- "Twelfth Night"
- "Two Gentlemen Of Verona"
- "A Winter’s Tale"
- "Measure For Measure"
- "Cymbeline"

("The Two Noble Kinsmen" is Missing)

== Cast ==
- Barry Purves - Will, a poor player (animation)
- Roger Rees - Peter, a Producer (voice)

== Production ==
The film was commissioned by Channel 4 as part of a 5-part series of Aardman animations titled Lip Synch: Creature Comforts (1989), Going Equipped (1990), Ident (1990), Next (1990) and War Story (1989).

Peter was voiced by Roger Rees and is reading one of Hall's books. The halo indicates that he represents Saint Peter, and that Shakespeare is auditioning to get into Heaven. The film references all of 37 Shakespeare plays.

A clip of this short was shown in the 2003 documentary Animated Century.

== Critical reception ==
On IMDb, Next received a rating of 7.3/10 from 188 users.
