= Extreme Male Beauty =

- Presented by: Tim Shaw
- Narrated by: Tim Shaw
- Country of origin: United Kingdom
- Original language: English
- No. of series: 1
- No. of episodes: 4

Production
- Running time: 49 minutes approximately
- Production company: Cheetah Productions

Original release
- Network: Channel 4
- Release: 7 May – 28 May 2009

Extreme Male Beauty is a British documentary series which began airing on Channel 4 and features television presenter Tim Shaw as he explores the various lengths men will go to in order to achieve the beauty standards placed on them.

The series criticises the modelling industry and the 'perfect' body images shown in the media and, whilst Shaw attempts to conform to the desirable body images sold by advertisers. Some criticised the show for having an over-complicated format.

== Background ==
The first episode explores the overall male physique. In an experiment, Shaw puts himself and four other men with various body types, dressed only in briefs, on a podium and then has a room full of women observe and openly discuss what they do and don't like. He explores the possibility of liposuction but opts instead to improve his diet and exercise.

In the second episode Shaw explores penises and the various techniques alleged to increase penis length and girth. The episode showed a great deal of full frontal nudity, particularly penises in close-up, and featured a lengthy segment in which Shaw tests out various lengthening devices and techniques; this includes jelquing, a masturbatory technique which Shaw does on camera. In an experiment, Shaw has five men (including himself) put their penises through a hole in a wall so that a room full of women can observe and openly discuss what they do and don't like about each one.
