= Nick Middleton =

British geographer

Nick Middleton (born 1963 June 4) is a British physical geographer and supernumerary fellow of St Anne's College, Oxford. He specialises in desertification.

Middleton was born in London, England. As a geographer, he has travelled to more than 70 countries. In Going to Extremes, a Channel 4 television programme about extreme lifestyles, he experienced life in the hostile conditions that other cultures must endure. Part of his book 'Extremes Along the Silk Road' is included in NCERT's class 11 English textbook.

He won the Royal Geographical Society's Ness Award in 2002.

He has appeared on BBC 2's He met Norbu in Tibet Who later became his companion in Through the Keyhole.

== Publications ==
Thesis

- The Geography of Dust Storms (University of Oxford DPhil thesis, 1986)

Books as sole author

- Atlas of Countries That Don't Exist (San Francisco: Chronicle Books, 2017)
- Atlas of Environmental Issues (Oxford: Oxford University Press, 1988)
- Atlas of World Issues (Oxford: Oxford University Press, 1988)
- Desertification (Oxford: Oxford University Press)
- Desertification and Wind Erosion in the Western Sahel: the Example of Mauritania (Research Papers 40, Oxford: School of Geography University of Oxford, 1987)
- Extremes Along the Silk Road: Adventures off the World's Oldest Superhighway (London: John Murray, 2005; London: John Murray, 2006)
- Extremes: Surviving the World's Harshest Environments (New York: Thomas Dunne Books/St Martin's Press, 2005)
- The Global Casino: an Introduction to Environmental Issues (London: Arnold, 1995; 2nd edn 1999; 3rd edn 2003)
- Going to Extremes: Mud, Sweat and Frozen Tears (London: Channel 4, 2001; London: Pan, 2003)
- Ice Tea and Elvis: a Saunter Through the Southern States (London: Weidenfeld & Nicolson, 1999; London: Phoenix, 2000)
- Intellectual Property Rights: a Battleground for Trade and Biodiversity (Gland, Switzerland: International Union for Conservation of Nature and Natural Resources, 1999)
- Kalashnikovs and Zombie Cucumbers: Travels in Mozambique (London: Sinclair-Stevenson, 1994; London: Phoenix, 1995)
- The Last Disco in Outer Mongolia (London: Sinclair-Stevenson, 1992; London: Phoenix, 1993; London: Phoenix, 1995)
- Southern Africa (Hove: Macdonald Young Books, 1999)
- Surviving Extremes: Ice, Jungle, Sand and Swamp (London: Channel 4, 2003; London: Pan, 2004)
- Travels as a Brussels Scout (London: Weidenfeld & Nicolson, 1997; London: Phoenix, 1998)
- Extremes Along The Silk Road

Co-authored books

- Andrew Goudie and Nick Middleton, Bibliography of Desert Dust Storms and Their Consequences (Oxford Environmental Change Unit Bibliography No. 1, 1990)
- Nick Middleton, The Bloody Baron: Wicked Dictator of the East (London: Short, 2001)
- Neil Grant and Nick Middleton, The Daily Telegraph Atlas of the World Today (London: Telegraph, 1987)
- Andrew Goudie and Nick Middleton, Desert Dust in the Global System (Heidelberg: Springer, 2006)
- D.S.G. Thomas and Nick Middleton, Desertification: Exploding the Myth (Chichester: Wiley, 1994)
- Nick Middleton and D.S.G. Thomas, eds, World Atlas of Desertification (London: Arnold, 1992; 2nd edn 1997)..

Co-authored articles

- Andrew Goudie and Nick Middleton, "The Changing Frequency of Dust Storms Through Time", Climatic Change 20 (1992), 197–225
- Andrew Goudie and Nick Middleton, "Dust Storms in the Middle East", Bulletin de la Classe des sciences 6:13:7-12 (Brussels: Académie royale des sciences, 2002), 379–99
