= Ray Alan =

English ventriloquist, television personality (1930-2010)

- Born: Raymond Alan Whyberd; 18 September 1930; Greenwich, London, England
- Died: 24 May 2010 (aged 79); Redhill, Surrey, England
- Occupations: Ventriloquist; entertainer; writer
- Years active: 1944–2010
- Spouses: Greta Motherwell (m. 1956; div. 1972); Jane Laycock (m. 1991)

Raymond Alan Whyberd (18 September 1930 – 24 May 2010) was an English ventriloquist, television entertainer, and writer. His career spanned over half a century, though he was most popular from the 1950s until the 1980s. He was associated primarily with the dummies Lord Charles and Ali Kat and later with the puppets Tich and Quackers.

== Early life ==
Born Raymond Alan Whyberd in Greenwich, London, Alan was educated at Morden Terrace School, Lewisham. He was introduced to the world of entertainment at a young age, entering a talent contest at the age of five at his local Gaumont cinema.

== Entertainment career ==
Aged 13, Alan became a call-boy at the Hippodrome Theatre in Lewisham, where he started to do magic sets on stage between acts. He then started to entertain private functions, introducing ventriloquism into his act, along with playing the ukulele. He soon left school to begin performing full-time.

Alan toured in cabaret all over the world and performed once with Laurel and Hardy in 1954. Laurel had provided inspiration for the look of Alan's most famous creation, Lord Charles, who first appeared at a charity show in Wormwood Scrubs Prison, London.

Alan made his television debut with Lord Charles on the BBC programme The Good Old Days in the 1960s and the pair regularly re-appeared on the programme. In the 1960s he also appeared on a children's programme Tich and Quackers with Tich, a small boy, and his pet duck Quackers. He created the puppet character Ali Cat for the HTV series Magic Circle (1977). He was also the presenter for two years of the BBC show Ice Show. In 1985 he was a special guest for Bob Hope's birthday show at London's Lyric Theatre. In 1986 he presented a show on Channel 4 on ventriloquism, called A Gottle of Geer, which he later adapted into a book.

Alan continued to perform into his seventies, doing tours, performing in plays, and undertaking conference and corporate events. In 1998/1999 he entertained guests on the QE2. He took a break from stage work due to ill health but he did not rule out a return, if his health had permitted. His last stage appearance was in November 2008 when he performed at a special charity concert in Bridlington organised by his friend Greg Knight who was MP for the town. At the end of his performance he received a standing ovation.

== Writing ==
Alan wrote four novels: Death and Deception in 2007 and A Game of Murder in 2008 (both published by Robert Hale), A Fear of Vengeance (2010, published by FA Thorpe) and Retribution (2011, published posthumously by Robert Hale).

He also wrote for Tony Hancock, Dave Allen and for the shows Morecambe and Wise, The Two Ronnies and Bootsie and Snudge, usually under the name Ray Whyberd.

== Personal life ==
Alan married Greta Motherwell in 1956; they divorced in 1972. He was in a relationship with Barbie Hayes in the 1980s. He married Jane Laycock in 1991.

Alan lived in Reigate, Surrey. He died from complications of pneumonia and pulmonary fibrosis at East Surrey Hospital in Redhill, on 24 May 2010, at the age of 79.

== Media appearances ==
=== Television ===
- David Nixon's Comedy Bandbox (1966)
- The Tich and Quackers Show (1966)
- Ice Show (1969)
- The Generation Game (1974)
- Tell Me Another (1976–1978, guest, comedic anecdotal series)
- Magic Circle (1977)
- Three Little Words (c. 1980)
- Give Us a Clue (17 November 1980)
- The Sooty Show – "Soo's Party Problem" (1983)
- Mike Reid's Mates and Music (1984)
- Bobby Davro's TV Weekly (1987)

Alan was also the presenter of the panel game Where in the World and of the children's quiz show It's Your Word. He also hosted Cartoon Carnival and made many appearances on later game shows such as Celebrity Squares, Give Us A Clue, Family Fortunes, 3-2-1, Bullseye and The Bob Monkhouse Show. Alan also appeared on The Des O'Connor Show and on Blue Peter.

=== Radio ===
- The Impressionists, BBC Radio 2 (guest 1974–75; host 1980–88)
- Just a Minute, BBC Radio 4 (four appearances late 1970s)
- The News Huddlines, BBC Radio 4 (presenter for one show, 29 October 1975)
