= Street Genius =

- Also known as: None of the Above
- Genre: Popular science; Entertainment
- Directed by: Christopher Gaunt; Simon Tatum; and others
- Presented by: Tim Shaw
- Starring: Tim Shaw
- Narrated by: Tim Shaw
- Country of origin: United States
- Original language: English
- No. of seasons: 2
- No. of episodes: 32

Production
- Executive producers: Michael J. Miller; Alan Hayling; Jam Stansfield; and others
- Producers: Chris Goodenough; Jake Cardew; and others
- Production location: United States
- Editors: Darren Cathan; Derek Kersting; Michael Pearce; Marc Tondeur; Abraham Teweldebrhan; Andy Phillips; Iain Chambers; and others
- Running time: 22mins approx. (not inc. advertisements)
- Production companies: Renegade Pictures UK; National Geographic Channel

Original release
- Network: National Geographic Channel; Netflix
- Release: June 10, 2013 – May 18, 2015

Street Genius (formerly known as None of the Above) is a popular science TV series that airs on National Geographic Channel. It features scientific experiments related mainly to physics, chemistry and engineering performed by British presenter and engineer Tim Shaw to regular passers-by. The show is also currently available on Netflix in Brazil, Argentina, Colombia, Mexico, Costa Rica and Panama.

== Format ==
In each episode, Tim Shaw walks about the streets inviting people to participate in or observe a scientific experiment. After the experiment is explained to them, Tim asks what they think the outcome will be. Once all participants or observers have given their opinions, Tim asks the viewers which, out of those predictions, will prove to be the correct one. "None of the above" is usually one of the multiple choice options presented, being the inspiration for the original title of the series in season 1. After the experiment is done, Tim then proceeds to explain why the correct option was right and the others were wrong, generally accompanied by on-screen graphical explanations and demonstrations in the form of images and animations.

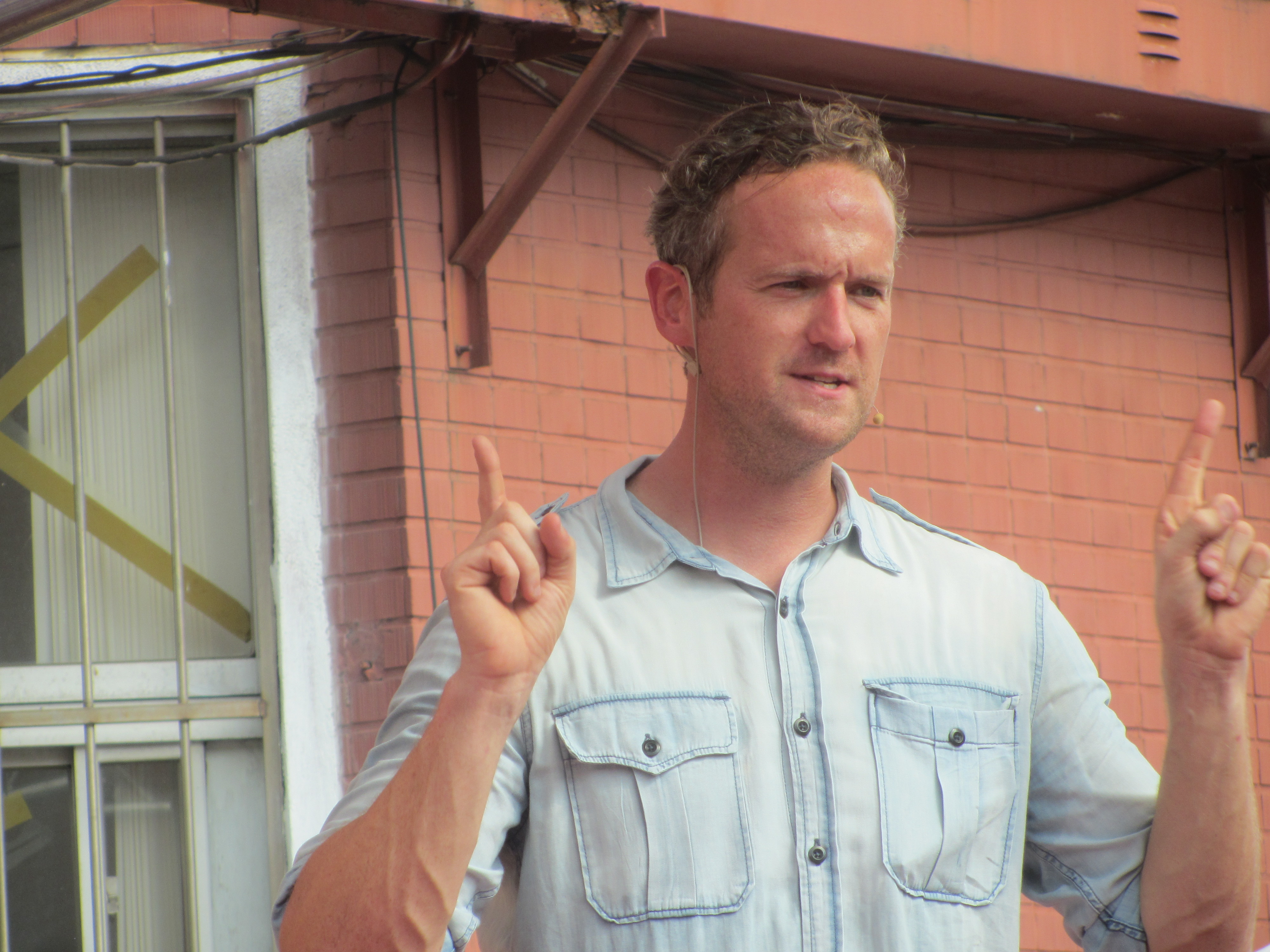
Tim Shaw, the show's host and scientific consultant.

== Episodes ==
=== Season 1 (2013–14) ===
No. overall	No. in series	Title	Original release date
1	1	"Fire and Water"	June 10, 2013
2	2	"Forces of Nature"	September 13, 2013
3	3	"In the Line of Fire"	November 11, 2013
4	4	"Extreme Heat"	January 27, 2014
5	5	"Smash and Grab"	February 3, 2014
6	6	"Sparks Will Fly"	March 24, 2014
7	7	"Breaking Point"	March 31, 2014
8	8	"Under Pressure"	April 7, 2014
9	9	"Blown Apart"	April 14, 2014
10	10	"Spitting Fire"	April 14, 2014
11	11	"Raining Fire"	April 21, 2014
12	12	"The Big Bangs"	April 21, 2014
13	13	"Blast Off"	April 28, 2014
14	14	"Defying Gravity"	April 28, 2014
15	15	"Powers of Attraction"	May 5, 2014
16	16	"Deep Heat"	May 5, 2014
17	17	"What Goes Up"	May 12, 2014
18	18	"Chain Reactions"	May 12, 2014
19	19	"Waves of Fire"	May 19, 2014
20	20	"Short Fuse"	May 19, 2014

=== Season 2 (2015) ===
No. overall	No. in series	Title	Original release date
21	1	"Shattering Conclusions"	March 30, 2015
22	2	"Falling, Floating, Feasting"	March 30, 2015
23	3	"Master Blaster"	April 6, 2015
24	4	"Shooters, Showers & Shockwaves"	April 6, 2015
25	5	"Pressure Cooker"	April 13, 2015
26	6	"Crash & Burn"	April 13, 2015
27	7	"Positively Shocking"	April 27, 2015
28	8	"Blow It Up"	April 27, 2015
29	9	"Shock & Awe"	May 4, 2015
30	10	"Pedal to the Metal"	May 4, 2015
31	11	"Blasts, Fire & Beers"	May 11, 2015
32	12	"Human Cannonball"	May 18, 2015
