= Ahmad Dede =

Ahmed Dede (born 1960) is an Islamic sheikh, and a follower of the Sufi order of Islam, who helps spread Sufism and the art of Sufi Whirling in the United Kingdom. He has appeared on British television several times.

== Biography ==
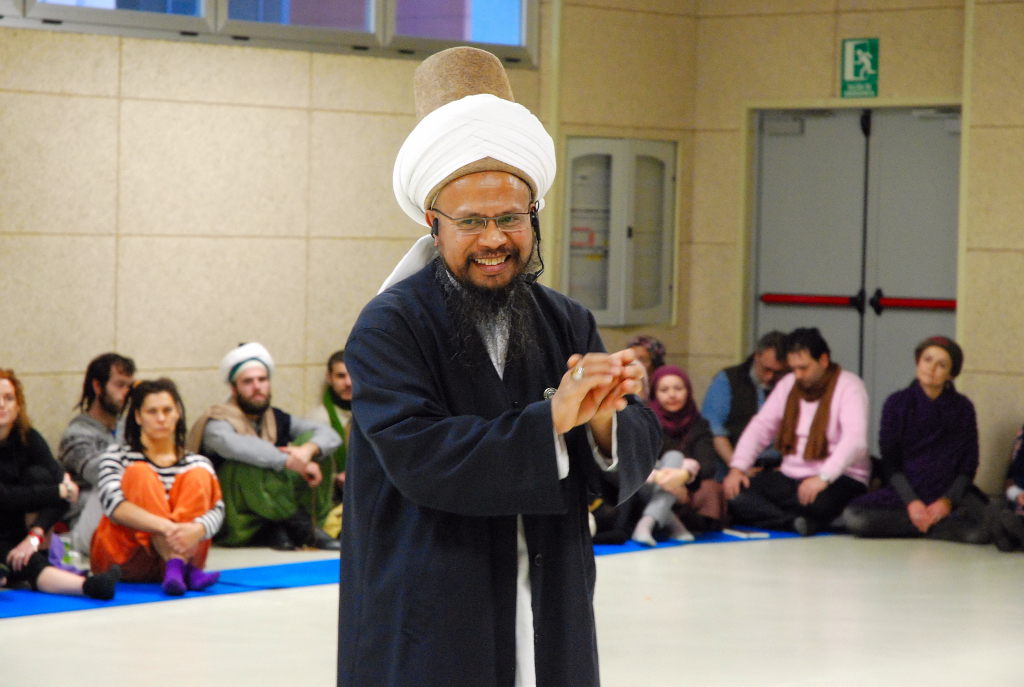
Sheikh Ahmad Dede in a dervish whirling workshop in Madrid, Spain (02/2012)

His parents, the Pattisahusiwas, came from the Maluku island of Saparua in Indonesia. In the 1950s they emigrated to The Netherlands. On 2 July 1960, Ahmad was born in the village of Balk. He was the seventh of nine children. In 1966, they moved to Ridderkerk. In 1976 his father died. Shortly afterward, Ahmad announced 'on my 22nd birthday, I shall die'. He never really knew why he said this. In 1981, leading up to his 22nd birthday he began to talk about his strange statement. Others suggested it symbolised the death of the old Ahmad, and he would have a spiritual 'rebirth'. Shortly after this, he dedicated his life to Allah (God). He claimed to have had strange dreams, and went on a retreat to an old mosque for two months. When he turned 22, during the Islamic holy month of Ramadan, he read his first book about Sufism called 'Whirling to Allah'. In 1985 he met the Sufi saint Grandsheikh Sultan Muhammad Nazim al Haqqani an-Naqshbandi. He became a follower of the saint and swore an oath to follow the Sufi Mevlevi Order. While both of them were together in England, in 1986, the Grand Sheikh gave Ahmed his personal blessings. He then worked at Sufi camps and classes and in 1994 began to believe that the Holy Opening, the first surah (chapter) of the Qur'an could be used as a gateway to spread Sufism. Then, in 1995, his brother, Djailani died, and this saddened him significantly. He then claimed to receive visions of his Grand Sheikh helping him through this difficult time, and teaching him to spread the message. Since then he has travelled around Europe teaching Sufi Whirling through classes, courses, and his music.

== Music ==
He has released an album with songs on it called Forever Haqqani. Despite the fact that many Muslims regard music as a diversion from Allah, Dede has said that if a song is about Allah it cannot be a diversion but a tool to get to feel Allah.

== Television appearances ==
Ahmad has appeared on the popular BBC Sunday morning religion and spirituality based program, The Heaven and Earth Show. He also appeared on Channel 4's program, Spirituality Shopper. He then appeared on Japanese NTC TV's Cooking with Pete (奋斗终), giving Pete a lesson on how to properly cook an omelette.
