= Break the Science Barrier =

1996 television documentary written and presented by Richard Dawkins

- Cover of the DVD released by The Richard Dawkins Foundation for Reason and Science
- Written by: Richard Dawkins
- Starring: Richard Dawkins, Douglas Adams, David Attenborough, Jocelyn Bell Burnell
- Music by: Paddy Kingsland
- Country of origin: United Kingdom
- Original language: English

Production
- Producer: John Gau
- Cinematography: Bob Jones, Sam Montague
- Editor: John Hackney
- Running time: 50 mins. approx.

Original release
- Network: Channel 4
- Release: 30 October 1996

Break the Science Barrier is a 1996 television documentary written and presented by Richard Dawkins, which promotes the viewpoint that scientific endeavour is not only useful, but also intellectually stimulating and exciting. Featuring interviews with many well-known figures from the world of science and beyond, it was originally broadcast on Channel 4 in the United Kingdom — the first of a series of collaborations between Dawkins and the station — before being released on DVD more than a decade later. The documentary contains many of the themes later expounded in his book Unweaving the Rainbow, which was published two years after the initial broadcast.
