= UK Late =

British television series

UK Late is a Channel 4 television series broadcast in 1987. Before it was launched it was described by the Dublin Evening Herald as "a dozen people will take centre stage of a London night-club to entertain an invited audience and bring all that is best in an after-dinner discussion or bar-room debate to the screen". A couple of weeks later The Listener magazine described it as "a fairly disastrous attempt at a hybrid, a thematic discussion rather than a chat show".

The anchors were journalist John Lloyd and commentator Mary Harron. The television critic of The Times Literary Supplement reviewed it as follows: "I am not sure what has happened to the spirit of the Sixties, but the corpse is currently being trundled around the television studios. Channel 4’s new late-night talk show, UK Late (July 17), consigned it to a circle of hell superficially disguised as a salon from an existentialist play."

Nancy Banks-Smith, a regular television reviewer for The Guardian wrote: "It was like coming back from the holidays to find the burglars had been...After Dark, Channel 4's attractive small hours talk-show, had been succeeded by UK Late...a brawl with an audience."

A later edition was reviewed by the Sunday Independent in Dublin as "This week it was 'What Happened To Sex'. There were gays, professors, counsellors and of course Deborah, the stripper...to discuss, over a table littered with empty glasses, our and their hang-ups. Even after a few pints it was boring".

The director was Bob Marsland, the producer Lino Ferrari and the production company Panoptic. There was no second series.
