= Going to Extremes (British TV series) =

British Television Programme

Going to Extremes and Surviving Extremes are television programmes made for Channel 4 by Nick Middleton. In each episode of the two series, Middleton visited an extreme area of the world to find out how people have adapted to life there.

Both Going to Extremes and Surviving Extremes were accompanied by books of the same name, except in the USA where the latter was titled Extremes: Surviving the World's Harshest Environments.

There was also a third series, titled Going to Extremes: The Silk Routes.

== Going to Extremes ==
In this series, Middleton visited the coldest, hottest, driest and wettest permanent settlements in the world.

Coldest

Oymyakon in Siberia, where the average winter temperature is −47 °F (− 44 °C).

Driest

Arica in Chile, where there had been fourteen consecutive years without rain. Fog is the only local source of water.

Wettest

Mawsynram in India, where average annual rainfall is 14 meters, falling within a four-month period in the monsoon season. The rainfall is approximately equal to that of its neighbor Cherrapunji.

Hottest

Dallol in Ethiopia, known as the 'Hell-hole of creation' where the temperature averages 94 °F (34 °C) over the year.

== Surviving Extremes ==
In his second series, Middleton visited places without permanent towns, locations where "survival requires a lifestyle completely in tune with Nature's rhythms."

Sand – Niger
Middleton travelled with a group of women across the Sahara in extreme heat to trade date palms.

Ice – Greenland
Middleton travelled with the indigenous people of northern Greenland, where four fifths of the land is permanently ice-covered.

Jungle – Democratic Republic of Congo
Middleton visited the dangerous jungle in Congo.

Swamp – Papua
Middleton examined how people live with very little solid land.

Toxic – Kazakhstan
Middleton visited an abandoned Soviet biological weapons testing site with a toxic environment.
