= Dolce Vito – Dream Restaurant =

British television documentary series

Dolce Vito – Dream Restaurant is a 2009 Channel Four television documentary following Vito Cataffo, an Italian-British restaurateur, as he tries to open a restaurant in Italy serving British cuisine.

The series follows Cataffo as he finds a failing Italian restaurant, rescues and renovates it, and then sets about transforming it into a British restaurant. It also shows Cataldo meeting various producers of high-end British ingredients, and testing these products on the Italian public. Dolce Vito began to air in August 2009, and continued through to September.

Cataffo died in 2010.
