= Spirituality Shopper =

- Starring: Jonathan Edwards
- Original language: English
- No. of series: 1
- No. of episodes: 3

Original release
- Network: Channel 4
- Release: 2005

Spirituality Shopper is a British television series that ran on Channel 4 for 3 episodes in 2005. It was presented by Christian athlete, Jonathan Edwards. In each episode, a person looked at four different religious practices that could be implemented in their (non-religious) lives to see if it would bring them inner peace in the hustle and bustle of the 21st century. In each episode, four of the practices were looked at:

- Episode 1 - Michaela, who looks at Sufi Whirling (as taught by Sheikh Ahmad Dede), Buddhist Meditation, Christian Lent and Jewish Shabbat.
- Episode 2 - Karen, who looks at Christian Gospel singing, Sikh langars, Hindu yoga, and Christian Meditation.
- Episode 3 - Charlie, who looks at Taoist Tai Chi, Pagan drumming, Quaker contemplation and Islamic prayer.
