= Airplaneski! =

Airplaneski! is a British 1995 Channel 4 72 minute documentary directed by Norman Hull, concerning the state of Russian civil aviation after the break-up of the Soviet Union and the subsequent division of Aeroflot into several hundred minor airlines. It contains interviews with Aeroflot pilots and crew, and with Western passengers who give accounts of comical or unusual events they have encountered on their travels. The documentary was screened on the 13th of July 1995, as part of Channel 4's True Stories season.

The programme was made by Great Percy Productions and was produced by Helen Hill. The programme won the Golden Spire Award at the 1996 San Francisco Film Festival.

The title is a reference to the 1980 comedy film Airplane!
