= Ban This Filth =

- Opening theme: "Symphony No. 5, Fourth Movement: Allegro" by Ludwig van Beethoven
- No. of seasons: 1
- No. of episodes: 6

Production
- Running time: 22–24 minutes
- Production company: Zeppotron

Original release
- Network: Channel 4
- Release: 12 October – 16 November 2004

Ban This Filth was a spoof television programme that aired on Channel 4 in October 2004. The show was presented as a crusade against pornography, profanity and nudity on television. The three presenters are all elderly middle class women, who warn viewers what programmes not to watch in the coming week. It is presented in a tongue-in-cheek fashion, with segments such as:

- What not to watch, a review of programmes with nudity or pornographic scenes, the times and channels are given so viewers can avoid them
- Review of pornographic DVDs, presented, as what not to buy
- Interviews with porn stars, asking them to quit the business
- Documentary segments covering adult babies, or dogging for example
