= Why Men Don't Iron =

1998 British documentary series

Why Men Don't Iron is British three-part documentary series shown on Channel 4 in June 1998, about sex differences in cognition, caused by differences in male-female neurochemistry, and elementary reward systems in the human brain.

== Production ==
The series was produced by Jim Meyer and Anne Moir, and originated by Bill Moir. The titles were made by Triffic Films. It was made by Quality Time Television. The series was first broadcast on 23 June 1998.

A book on the series was published in 1999 by Anne Moir, ISBN 0007468911.

== Episodes ==
=== Episode 1 ===
Learning the Difference

Amanda Smith, and her husband, tried to overcome biological sex differences with her children, but it never took hold; boys chose mechanical toys, girls chose painting; girls, from an early age, were more conscientious when learning; neurobiologist Roger Gorski conducted sex difference developmental biology experiments with rodents; the congenital adrenal hyperplasia (CAH) condition; a teenage girl has a concentration span of fifteen minutes, a teenage boy has five minutes; a comprehensive secondary school in north Essex, where teenagers are given a psychological test by psychologist Ernie Govier of the University of East London; doctor Bennett Shaywitz and his wife Sally Shaywitz; psychologist Michael O'Boyle of Iowa State University; psychologist Gina Grimshaw and pre-natal testosterone differences; at school, eight times as many boys than girls are expelled; four times as many girls than boys study foreign languages at A-level; former headteacher Alan Davison believed that boys learned differently; teacher Sue Moss; English teacher Jenny Fincken.

=== Episode 2 ===
The Brain at Work

The two sexes tend to choose much different jobs; the British engineering industry had a fifteen-year campaign to recruit women, with limited, if any, success; engineer Carolina Bartram; her parents nor her teachers scarcely approved of her wanting to become an engineer; nine out of ten nurses are women; Canadian Helen Fisher (anthropologist) believed that women had better people skills; the dichotic listening test; two out of three dentists were men, but nearly all dental nurses are women; 99% of all electricians are men; the UK Giant Vegetable Championships in Spalding, Lincolnshire; only one woman takes part; the Westminster Warriors compete in men's basketball against the Solent Stars; all of the world's top chess players, except one, were men; Fulham F.C. loses to Grimsby Town F.C. 2–0; stock trader Peter Matthews, who raced cars; some men became neurologically addicted to seeking danger, sensation seeking; psychologist Prof Marvin Zuckerman and the neurotransmitters dopamine, linked to direct pleasure seeking, and serotonin, which inhibited recklessness and impulsiveness; men had lower levels of enzyme MAO than women, which biochemically inhibited risk-taking, by regulating the amounts of dopamine and serotonin.

== See also ==
- Body Story, also made by Channel 4 in 1998
- History of evolutionary psychology
- Problem gambling, a risk-taking addiction
- Is your Brain Male or Female?, a September 2014 Horizon episode, presented by Michael Mosley and Alice Roberts, it featured neuroscientist Melissa Hines, researchers at the Perelman School of Medicine at the University of Pennsylvania, Dunraven School in Streatham and career choices, neuroscientist Jeffrey Mogil at the McGill Faculty of Medicine and Health Sciences and the genetics of pain, and Claire Gibson at the University of Leicester, about more women have strokes than men
