= Where in the World (British game show) =

British TV quiz show (1983–1985)

- Developed by: HTV
- Presented by: Michael Parkinson; Ray Alan
- Country of origin: United Kingdom

Production
- Running time: 22 minutes

Original release
- Network: BBC1
- Release: 12 January 1971 – 4 July 1973
- Network: Channel 4
- Release: 3 October 1983 – 21 April 1985

Where in the World is an early evening quiz programme shown on Channel 4 in the UK. The quiz tested contestants' knowledge of geography and was produced by HTV West from about 1983 until 1985. The programme was hosted by Ray Alan. Alan previously hosted a version that was shown on BBC1 from 1972 to 1973, replacing original host Michael Parkinson, who presented the first season in 1971.
