= Top Ten (TV series) =

UK television series (1995–2002)

- Channel 4 Top Ten TV show Title
- Genre: Archive show, Countdown list show
- Presented by: Various
- Narrated by: Various
- Country of origin: United Kingdom
- Original language: English
- No. of series: 6
- No. of episodes: 47

Production
- Production company: Chrysalis Entertainment

Original release
- Network: Channel 4
- Release: 8 May 1995 – 30 November 2002

Top Ten is a humorous look at a set of top ten acts in various music and TV genres, broadcast on Channel 4 in the UK from 1995 to 2002. Each episode features a rundown of top ten artists, characters and TV shows. The reason they qualify to appear in the top ten is based on a variety of criteria related to the genre they are in (or as Tony Blackburn put it in the Glam Top Ten episode "using facts, data and information"). The show has a format where the genre is introduced, a presenter introduces each of the acts and a narrator describes each of the acts in their segment. The show uses talking heads and archive footage to tell the story of each act with funny and interesting insights.

== Episodes ==
No.	Title	Presenter	Narrator	Top Ten	Original release date
1	"The Glam Top Ten"	Alan Freeman; Tony Blackburn	Dani Behr; Patrick Allen	Countdown: 10. Alice Cooper; 9. Alvin Stardust; 8. Suzi Quatro; 7. Roy Wood & Wizzard; 6. Bay City Rollers; 5. Mud; 4. The Sweet; 3. Gary Glitter; 2. T. Rex; 1. Slade	8 May 1995
2	"Top Ten Disco"	Antonio Fargas	Jeff Young	Countdown: 10. KC and the Sunshine Band; 9. Gloria Gaynor; 8. Kool & The Gang; 7. Village People; 6. Earth Wind & Fire; 5. Odyssey; 4. Chic; 3. The Jackson 5; 2. Donna Summer; 1. Bee Gees	12 September 1998
3	"Top Ten Heavy Metal"	Lemmy	Alan Freeman	Countdown: 10. UFO; 9. Judas Priest; 8. Saxon; 7. Motörhead; 6. Whitesnake; 5. Rainbow; 4. Def Leppard; 3. Deep Purple; 2. Black Sabbath; 1. Iron Maiden	6 March 1999
4	"Top Ten Eighties Romantics"	Boy George	Mark Radcliffe	Countdown: 10. Visage; 9. Japan; 8. ABC; 7. Soft Cell; 6. Ultravox; 5. The Human League; 4. Culture Club; 3. Spandau Ballet; 2. Adam And The Ants; 1. Duran Duran	13 March 1999
5	"Top Ten Country"	Catherine Bach		Countdown: 10. Tammy Wynette; 9. Glen Campbell; 8. Johnny Cash; 7. John Denver; 6. Dolly Parton; 5. Hank Williams; 4. Reba McEntire; 3. Willie Nelson; 2. Kenny Rogers; 1. Garth Brooks	20 March 1999
6	"Top Ten really Annoying Records"	Keith Chegwin	Jo Brand	Countdown: 10. St. Winifred's School Choir - There's No One Quite Like Grandma; 9. Joe Dolce Music Theatre - Shaddap You Face; 8. Keith Harris & Orville - Orville's Song; 7. Goombay Dance Band - Seven Tears; 6. Renée & Renato - Save Your Love; 5. Clive Dunn - Grandad; 4. The Wurzels - The Combine Harvester; 3. Father Abraham & The Smurfs - The Smurfs Song; 2. Little Jimmy Osmond - Long Haired Lover From Liverpool; 1. Black Lace - Agadoo	3 April 1999
7	"Top Ten Scandals"	Christine Hamilton; Neil Hamilton			17 April 1999
8	"Top Ten Christmas"	Noddy Holder		Countdown: 10. I Wish it Could be Christmas Everyday by Wizzard; 9. Walking in the Air by Aled Jones; 8. Fairytale of New York by The Pogues and Kirsty MacColl; 7. I Believe in Father Christmas by Greg Lake; 6. Mary's Boy Child by Boney M.; 5. When a Child is Born by Johnny Mathis; 4. Mistletoe and Wine by Cliff Richard; 3. Merry Xmas Everybody by Slade; 2. Happy Christmas (War is Over) by John Lennon; 1. White Christmas by Bing Crosby	24 December 1999
9	"Top Ten TV Cops"	Christopher Ellison			2000
10	"Top Ten One-hit Wonders"	Phill Jupitus		Countdown: 10. Jilted John with Jilted John; 9. The Crazy World of Arthur Brown with Fire; 8. Althea & Donna with Uptown Top Ranking; 7. Our Kid with You Just might See Me Cry; 6. Men at Work with Down Under; 5. Toni Basil with Mickey; 4. Charles & Eddie with Would I Lie To You?; 3. Nena with 99 Red Balloons; 2. Doctor and the Medics / Norman Greenbaum with Spirit in the Sky; 1. Carl Douglas with Kung Fu Fighting	22 January 2000
11	"Top Ten Girl Groups"	Louise Redknapp		Countdown: 10. The Ronettes; 9. The Nolans; 8. The Go-Go's; 7. The Three Degrees; 6. Salt-N-Pepa; 5. Sister Sledge; 4. TLC; 3. Bananarama; 2. Spice Girls; 1. The Supremes	29 January 2000
12	"Top Ten Punk"	Malcolm McLaren	Ian Dury	Countdown: 10. The Damned; 9. X-Ray Spex; 8. Stiff Little Fingers; 7. Buzzcocks; 6. The Undertones; 5. Sham 69; 4. Siouxsie and the Banshees; 3. The Clash; 2. The Stranglers; 1. The Sex Pistols	5 February 2000
13	"Top Ten Love Songs"	Errol Brown		Countdown: 10. Barry White - You're the First, the last, My Everything; 9. Chris de Burgh - The Lady in Red; 8. Sinéad O'Connor - Nothing Compares 2 U 7. Lionel Richie - Hello; 6. Percy Sledge - When A Man Loves A Woman; 5. Dolly Parton/Whitney Houston - I Will Always Love You; 4. Bryan Adams - (Everything I Do) I Do It for You; 3. Badfinger/Harry Nilsson - Without You; 2. The Troggs/Wet Wet Wet - Love Is All Around; 1. Jimmy Young/The Righteous Brothers/Robson & Jerome - Unchained Melody	12 February 2000
14	"Top Ten Stadium Rock"	Alice Cooper	Bill Bailey	Countdown: 10. Kiss; 9. Heart; 8. Poison; 7. ZZ Top; 6. Mötley Crüe; 5. Bon Jovi; 4. Van Halen; 3. Guns N' Roses; 2. Metallica; 1. Aerosmith	19 February 2000
15	"Top Ten Boy Bands"	Paula Yates	Dale Winton	Countdown: 10. Curiosity Killed the Cat; 9. The Monkees; 8. The Osmonds; 7. New Kids on the Block; 6. Bros; 5. East 17; 4. Bay City Rollers; 3. Wham!; 2. Take That; 1. Boyzone	26 February 2000
16	"Top Ten Sixties Soul"	Smokey Robinson		Countdown: 10. Sam and Dave; 9. Martha and the Vandellas; 8. Otis Redding; 7. Ray Charles; 6. Smokey Robinson; 5. Four Tops; 4. Aretha Franklin; 3. The Temptations; 2. Marvin Gaye; 1. The Supremes	11 March 2000
17	"Top Ten Seventies Soul"	Isaac Hayes	Trevor Nelson	Countdown: 10. Curtis Mayfield; 9. The Isley Brothers; 8. Isaac Hayes; 7. George Clinton; 6. Sly and the Family Stone; 5. Al Green; 4. The O'Jays; 3. Marvin Gaye; 2. Stevie Wonder; 1. James Brown	18 March 2000
18	"Top Ten Eurovision"	Harry Hill	Stuart Maconie	Countdown: 10. Switzerland; 9. Spain; 8. Malta; 7. Netherlands; 6. Luxembourg; 5. Sweden; 4. France; 3. Israel; 2. United Kingdom; 1. Ireland	1 April 2000
19	"Top Ten Comedy records"	Paul Whitehouse	Stuart Hall	Countdown: 10. Harry Enfield - Loadsamoney; 9. Windsor Davies & Don Estelle - Whispering Grass; 8. Rolf Harris - Tie Me Kangaroo Down, Sport; 7. The Young Ones - Living Doll; 6. Chef - Chocolate Salty Balls; 5. Ray Stevens - The Streak; 4. The Goodies - The Funky Gibbon; 3. Benny Hill - Ernie; 2. Monty Python - Always Look on the Bright Side of Life; 1. The Goons - Ying Tong Song	22 April 2000
20	"Top Ten Caribbean"	Maxi Priest		Countdown: 10. Jimmy Cliff; 9. Ricky Martin; 8. Shabba Ranks; 7. Desmond Dekker; 6. Shaggy; 5. Fugees; 4. Eddy Grant; 3. Billy Ocean; 2. Gloria Estefan; 1. Bob Marley	5 August 2000
21	"Top Ten 1990"	Phill Jupitus			14 October 2000
22	"Top Ten 1980"	Phill Jupitus	Phill Jupitus		21 October 2000
23	"Top Ten 1977"	Phill Jupitus			28 October 2000
24	"Top Ten 1987"	Phill Jupitus	Phill Jupitus		4 November 2000
25	"Top Ten Teen Idols"	Cat Deeley		Countdown: 10. Chesney Hawkes; 9. Leif Garrett; 8. Nick Heyward; 7. David Soul; 6. Peter Andre; 5. Paul Young; 4. David Essex; 3. Jason Donovan; 2. David Cassidy; 1. Donny Osmond	3 February 2001
26	"Top Ten Heartbreakers"	Isaac Hayes	Hermione Norris	Countdown: 10. The Sun Ain't Gonna Shine Anymore - The Walker Brothers; 9. All By Myself - Eric Carmen; 8. If You Leave Me Now - Chicago; 7. Crying - Roy Orbison; 6. The Tracks Of My Tears - The Miracles; 5. Love Don't Live Here Anymore - Rose Royce; 4. I'm Not In Love - 10cc 3. Smoke Gets In Your Eyes - Jerome Kern; 2. What Becomes Of The Brokenhearted - Jimmy Ruffin; 1. Walk On By - Dionne Warwick	10 February 2001
27	"Top Ten Eighties Soul"	Richard Blackwood		Countdown: 10. Cameo; 9. Linx; 8. Luthor Vandross; 7. Imagination; 6. Chaka Khan; 5. Shalamar; 4. Alexander O'Neal; 3. Kool & The Gang; 2. Soul II Soul; 1. Prince	17 February 2001
28	"Top Ten Holiday Hits"	Roy 'Chubby' Brown		Countdown: 10. Live is Life - Opus; 9. Boys - Sabrina; 8. Macarena - Los Del Río; 7. Barbados - Typically Tropical; 6. Y Viva Espana - Sylvia; 5. The Birdie Song - Tweets; 4. Agadoo - Black Lace; 3. Mambo No. 5 - Lou Bega; 2. Saturday Night - Whigfield; 1. In The Summertime - Mungo Jerry	24 February 2001
29	"Top Ten Prog Rock"	Bill Bailey	Mark Radcliffe	Countdown: 10. Camel; 9. King Crimson; 8. Hawkwind; 7. Rush; 6. Emerson, Lake and Palmer; 5. Yes; 4. Jethro Tull; 3. The Moody Blues; 2. Genesis; 1. Pink Floyd	3 March 2001
30	"Top Ten Duets"	Judy Finnigan; Richard Madeley	Simon Bates	Countdown: 10. Peters and Lee; 9. Esther and Abi; 8. Marvin Gaye and Tammi Terrell; 7. Ike and Tina Turner; 6. Donny and Marie Osmond; 5. Dollar; 4. Elton John and Kiki Dee; 3. John Travolta and Olivia Newton-John; 2. Captain & Tennile; 1. Sonny and Cher	10 March 2001
31	"Top Ten Guitar Heroes"	Rick Parfitt; Francis Rossi	Bill Bailey	Countdown: 10. Johnny Marr; 9. Richie Blackmore; 8. Carlos Santana; 7. The Edge; 6. Pete Townshend; 5. Brian May; 4. Hank Marvin; 3. Jimmy Page; 2. Eric Clapton; 1. Jimi Hendrix	24 March 2001
32	"Top Ten X-Rated"	John Lydon	Hermione Norris		31 March 2001
33	"Top Ten Electropop Pioneers"	Marc Almond	Paul Tonkinson	Countdown: 10. Bronski Beat; 9. Thompson Twins; 8. New Order; 7. Gary Numan; 6. Tears for Fears; 5. Orchestral Manoeuvres in the Dark; 4. The Human League; 3. Erasure; 2. Depeche Mode; 1. Pet Shop Boys	7 April 2001
34	"Top Ten Pop Princesses"	Louise Redknapp; Cerys Matthews	Arabella Weir	Countdown: 10. Sade; 9. Tiffany; 8. Debbie Gibson; 7. Suzi Quatro; 6. Britney Spears; 5. Sheena Easton; 4. Kate Bush; 3. Lulu; 2. Kim Wilde; 1. Kylie Minogue	14 April 2001
35	"Top Ten Easy Listening"	Andy Williams		Countdown: 10. Tony Bennett; 9. Dione Warwick; 8. Dean Martin; 7. Dusty Springfield; 6. Engelbert Humperdinck; 5. The Carpenters; 4. Andy Williams; 3. Nat King Cole; 2. Burt Bacharach; 1. Frank Sinatra	21 April 2001
36	"Top Ten Rap"	Flavor Flav; Mark Lamarr			25 May 2001
37	"Top Ten Girl Bands"	[repeat broadcast of "Girl Groups" episode from Jan 2000]			9 June 2001
38	"Top Ten 1981"	Suggs	Arabella Weir		14 July 2001
39	"Top Ten Hardmen"	Christopher Ellison	Mark Radcliffe	Nominees Top Ten order unknown DCI Frank Burnside - The Bill; Grant Mitchell - EastEnders; Bodie and Doyle - The Professionals; Terry McCann - Minder; Leonard Jeffrey "Oz" Osborne - Auf Wiedersehen, Pet; B. A. Baracus - The A-Team; Tony Soprano - The Sopranos; Jeremy Paxman - Newsnight; Edward Fitzgerald - Cracker; Robert McCall - The Equalizer	8 September 2001
40	"Top Ten TV Sci-Fi"	Tom Baker	Nick Frost	Countdown: 10. Space:1999; 9. Buck Rogers in the 25th Century; 8. The Tomorrow People; 7. Sapphire & Steel; 6. Blake's 7; 5. The Hitchhiker's Guide to the Galaxy; 4. Thunderbirds; 3. Red Dwarf; 2. Doctor Who; 1. Star Trek	13 October 2001
41	"Top Ten TV Bitches"	Kate O'Mara	Anna Raeburn	Countdown: 10. Stephanie Beacham; 9. She Devil (Ruth); 8. Kate O'Mara; 7. Miss Piggy; 6. Cindy Beale; 5. Alexis Colby; 4. Kim Tate; 3. Sybil Fawlty; 2. Dorien Green; 1. Anne Robinson	20 October 2001
42	"Top Ten TV Sex Bombs"	Jerry Hall	Gideon Coe	Countdown: 10. Lucy Lawless - Xena: Warrior Princess; 9. Daniela Nardini - This Life; 8. Letitia Dean - EastEnders; 7. Kim Cattrall - Sex and the City; 6. Pat Phoenix - Coronation Street; 5. Pamela Anderson - Baywatch; 4. Felicity Kendal - The Good Life; 3. Farrah Fawcett - Charlies Angels; 2. Diana Rigg - The Avengers; 1. Catherine Zeta-Jones - The Darling Buds of May	17 November 2001
43	"Top Ten Camp Icons"	Julie Goodyear	Matthew Kelly	Countdown: 10. Laurence Llewelyn-Bowen; 9. James Dreyfus; 8. Brian Dowling; 7. Larry Grayson; 6. Kenny Everett; 5. Dale Winton; 4. John Inman; 3. Julian Clary; 2. Lilly Savage; 1. Graham Norton	13 April 2002
44	"Top Ten TV Bastards"	Al Murray	Lesley Sharp		20 April 2002
45	"Top Ten Soap Queens"	Claire Sweeney			11 May 2002
46	"Top Ten Football Songs"				3 June 2002
47	"Top Ten Camp Pop"	Dale Winton		Countdown: 10. Divine; 9. Judas Priest; 8. Ricky Martin; 7. Puff Daddy; 6. Cher; 5. Marc Bolan; 4. Take That; 3. Steps; 2. Unknown; 1. Unknown	30 November 2002
48	"Top Ten Even More Annoying Records"	Simon Cowell; Neil Foxx			30 December 2002
49	"Top Ten Lovers"	Paul Daniels; Debbie McGee			unknown
50	"Top Ten Rebels"				unknown
