= Karaoke Fishtank =

British television series

Karaoke Fishtank is a British late-night television show which based its format on music videos. The show was hosted by a computer-animated fish called 'Vince Finn' (voiced by Logan Murray), who introduced each video in turn before it was played in a humorous manner, such as why Norman Cook is also known as 'Fatboy Slim' (although his real name is Quentin). In a separate introduction he defended Jennifer Lopez, saying her "arse" is not fat, and has muscle. He concludes this by asking the viewers, to "Just ask that fat bird from Emmerdale!". However, during the play of each video the lyrics would be shown at the bottom of the screen, while a bouncing-fish would move so the viewer if they chose to sing-along, would know what to sing and when. The graphics that produced the lyrics were made with the Windows application winOKE.

The show was broadcast on Channel 4 late-night every Friday on their 4Later segments, and ran between 22 September 2000 – 4 February 2001. It was also created by Televirtual, a sister-company to Broadsword Productions, who were the team behind the CITV Anglia Television show Knightmare. Claire Zolkwer of Endermol Entertainment was the main producer and director.

== Episode guide ==
There were twelve shows in the series, with five music videos shown on each one:-

Show 1

Another Level - "Freak Me"
Babybird - "You're Gorgeous"
Truesteppers & Dane Bowers ft Victoria Beckham - "Out of Your Mind"
Aqua - "Barbie Girl"
Beautiful South - "Perfect 10"

Show 2

Catatonia - "Road Rage"
Modjo - "Lady (Hear Me Tonight)"
Ronan Keating - "Life Is A Rollercoaster"
Britney Spears - "Oops! I Did It Again"
Chumbawamba - "Tubthumping"

Show 3

R.E.M. - "The Great Beyond"
Supergrass - "Pumping on Your Stereo"
Steps - "Last Thing on My Mind"
Jennifer Paige - "Crush"
White Town - "Your Woman"

Show 4

Jennifer Lopez - "Waiting For Tonight"
Fatboy Slim - "Praise You"
Pulp - "Common People"
Jamiroquai - "Deeper Underground"
S Club 7 - "Bring It All Back"

Show 5

Sisqo - "The Thong Song"
Spice Girls - "Stop"
Boyzone - "Picture of You"
Natalie Imbruglia - "Torn"
A1 - "Take On Me"

Show 6

Christina Aguilera - "Genie In A Bottle"
Backstreet Boys - "I Want It That Way"
Blink 182 - "All The Small Things"
Artful Dodger ft Craig David - "Rewind"
Moloko - "Sing It Back"

Show 7

Cher - "Believe"
Bloodhound Gang - "The Bad Touch"
5ive and Queen - "We Will Rock You"
Geri Halliwell - "Look At Me"
Ronan Keating - "When You Say Nothing At All"

Show 8

Gina G - "Ooh Aah... Just a Little Bit"
5ive - "Keep On Movin"
Travis - "Turn"
OMC - "How Bizarre"
Spice Girls - "Goodbye"

Show 9

Emma Bunton - "What I Am"
All Saints - "Never Ever"
Destiny's Child - "Bills, Bills, Bills"
Britney Spears - "Born To Make You Happy"
Catatonia - "Mulder and Scully"

Show 10 (21 January 2001)

Geri Halliwell - "Bag It Up"
Craig David - "7 Days"
Bran Van 3000 - "Drinking in LA"
Kelis - "Caught Out There"
Tom Jones & Stereophonics - "Mama Told Me Not To Come"

Show 11 (28 January 2001)

Macy Gray - "I Try"
Billie Piper - "Because We Want To"
Reef - "Place Your Hands"
S Club 7 - "Two in a Million"
Sonique - "It Feels So Good"

Show 12 (4 February 2001)

The Corrs - "What Can I Do?"
Barenaked Ladies - "One Week"
Martine McCutcheon - "Perfect Moment"
Texas - "Black Eyed Boy"
Sixpence None The Richer - "Kiss Me"

Coldplay- yellow was definitely in one episode, I remember singing along when I was off my head Travis - Why Does It Always Rain On Me was also definitely featured on one show.
