= Alien Investigations =

- Genre: Documentary
- Country of origin: United Kingdom
- Original language: English
- No. of series: 1
- No. of episodes: 1

Production
- Running time: 50 Minutes

Original release
- Network: Channel 4
- Release: 2 December 2012

Alien Investigations is a documentary examining four alien sightings from 2007 to 2012. Investigators examine the Metepec creature found in the Mexican town of Metepec, the Montauk Monster found washed up in Long Island, New York, a mummy with an elongated head found by an anthropologist in the Peruvian Andes and a pale, snub-nosed creature seen by four teenage Panamanian boys.

The show was first aired on Channel 4 in the United Kingdom on 2 December 2012.
