= The Language of Love (TV series) =

- Presented by: Davina McCall; Ricky Merino
- Country of origin: United Kingdom
- No. of episodes: 8

Production
- Production location: Spain

Original release
- Network: Channel 4

The Language of Love (also known as Davina McCall's Language of Love) is a 2022 British dating reality television show in which contestants try to form relationships with partners who speak a different language. It is set and filmed in Spain, and presented by Davina McCall and Ricky Merino.

The show has eight episodes and airs weekly on Channel 4. It features male and female contestants, each of whom only speak either English or Spanish. The contestants stay together in a villa in Spain and each is paired with another contestant who speaks a different language from them. In each episode, an event called the Selección allows some contestants to change the person they are paired with. For the most part, contestants communicate through the language barrier using dictionaries, gestures and so on. However some couples can gain access to a special area called the Zona Romántica where they can communicate more freely using simultaneous interpretation.
