= Orchestra United =

British television series

Orchestra United is a four-part British television series that follows a youth orchestra from its creation to a final, full-scale concert. The series was broadcast on Channel 4 during summer 2010.

The Hallé Harmony Youth Orchestra was formed from 75 young people (11 to 18 years of age) from Manchester who showed musical talent. The intention of its conductor, James Lowe, was to demonstrate that young people of all social, cultural and ethnic backgrounds could both enjoy and participate in major classical music. Two were selected to perform as soloists in a concert in the Hallé Orchestra's 2,000 seat Bridgewater Hall, an important concert venue in Manchester.
