= The Investigators (British TV series) =

British children's science television series

The Investigators is a BAFTA-nominated children's science programme, presented by children, on Channel 4 in Great Britain. It showed various interesting experiments from how to blow a balloon up with yeast to building bridges. Other experiments included on the program were making salmon flavoured ice cream and making periscopes. It aired on Saturday morning.
