= The Day the World Took Off =

Channel4 documentary series

The Day the World Took Off is a Channel 4 2000 six-part documentary series about the roots of the Industrial Revolution in England.

Five historians of science and industry gathered at the University of Cambridge to discuss why the Industrial Revolution occurred in England, at the time it did.

== Historical background ==
From 1650 to 1740 the population of England was essentially static - due to infant mortality and many water-borne diseases. But from 1740, infant mortality decreased by one half, in no more than 20 years. There is no obvious reason why that would have or could have occurred.

This drop in infant mortality, and disease in general, helped the industrial revolution to occur. Japan, France and the Netherlands also had the relative know-how to start an industrial revolution, although the Netherlands did not have coal. Neither of these countries had the industrial revolution. To have increased industry, would require close proximity of people, and that is how disease increases, and disease control was not an established science until one hundred years later, at least. Something had happened in Great Britain to allow different groups of people to come into close proximity in factories, without huge outbreaks in contagious diseases. Japan had the largest cities in the world, and had contained frequent outbreaks of disease, but Japan's industry was not as advanced, and the country had not developed wheeled motion of vehicles.

== Production ==
It was directed by Ian Duncan, with series producer David Dugan.

The series began Sunday 28 May 2000 at 8pm on Channel 4.

The same company that made the series followed the series up with Men of Iron, on Channel 4 on Monday 9 February 2004.

== Episodes ==
=== Episode 1 ===
In the 1720s, the death rate had begun to increase, as the poor began to drink less beer. More industrial machines were in North West England at that time, than the rest of the world put together. The first industrial steam engine had been built in Tipton in Staffordshire. From 1760 to 1830, the population of Manchester went from 22,000 to 235,000. Prof Joel Mokyr of Northwestern University describes how nature and industrial progress were incompatible. On Wednesday 15 September 1830 Fanny Kemble wrote about her journey on the train. The trials started at 11am and the train arrived at Manchester at 2.45pm. The Prime Minister was on the train. The French Revolution had happened two months before, and one or two French revolutionary flags were seen at the station, as small emblems of discontent and disquiet. There was no political revolution in England, but an industrial one.

=== Episode 2 ===
Britain now had many types of new of manufactured products to sell, from the 1750s.

France made mechanised objects, but mostly products such as automatons - the Digesting Duck of the innovative Jacques de Vaucanson of the 1820s. Vaucanson had the ingenuity to be the leader of an industrial revolution in France, and the King of France put him in charge of the French silk industry; Vaucanson drew up vast industrialised changes to this French industry, but workers fervently rose up against these plans and rioted - an industrial revolution in France would have much opposition to face. Britain was much more hard-nosed about innovation than France.

The iron industry began in Shropshire as coal and iron ore were found close together. The industrialist who started the industry was a Quaker.

Johann Friedrich Böttger and his factory in Meissen, which did not export, as described by Christopher Cullen. Britain had more well-established networks of entrepreneurs and inventors than France had, which lacked such networks. Through a discussion in one of these networks, the power loom was invented in 1784 in England. Five years later was the French Revolution, followed by an Anglo-French war, which ballooned Britain's national debt by 100 times, so that income tax had to be introduced. This was later removed, but permanently introduced in 1856. France had placed economic sanctions on Britain and had blockaded its maritime trade routes, but this was largely overcome at the Battle of Trafalgar on 21 October 1805.

=== Episode 3 ===
Britain's manufactured products needed to be transported around the world: the Netherlands was an innovative and strong maritime nation too, and had more ships.

The exploration of the Halve Maen in 1609; Joel Mokyr sails on the Half Moon (1989 replica). Five years later the Dutch sailed to the same area, and landed. The Dutch had the largest merchant fleet in the world, and had established important world trade routes, across the Dutch Empire. The Dutch had invested heavily in a new type of flower, the tulip, in the 1630s; and tulips became extraordinarily and wildly expensive, and this would become Tulip mania, but everything rapidly collapsed in February 1637. The Dutch had been the first to develop a working financial investment system, which would be wholly copied by the English, leading directly to the Bank of England in 1694. Whilst the Dutch had innovatively made the main advances in investment finance, they had not also done so in the acquisition of coal or mechanical innovations, as what was currently taking place across innovative England, mainly Staffordshire. The Netherlands could also be invaded, which England never suffered from, in those centuries.

Chris Cullen investigated the navigational advantage of ships with square sails. The Royal Society coordinated research in navigation, which enabled British sailors to reach countries that other countries couldn't reach, leading to Admiral Arthur Phillip establishing a settlement in Australia, on HMS Supply in 1788.

=== Episode 4 ===
The Heavenly Machine

How Europe developed over 500 years from 1350, and development of glass and the mechanical clock. Pluscarden Abbey in Moray in Scotland; the Rule of Saint Benedict; Buddhists and the Chinese were heavily influenced by rituals; Su Song; the Italian islands of Murano, known for its glass making; glass windows only developed, largely, in north-west Europe; shaped glass helped scientific instruments to be made, and lenses; other areas of the world did not develop this; the Japanese and Chinese had no glass technology, but developed pottery instead, and had paper windows, not glass; the first Chinese ship arrived in the West in 1850; historian Maxine Berg of the University of Warwick; the development of interchangeable parts in machinery; the US was now rapidly developing, in its industry, from the 1850s

=== Episode 6 ===
Animal Farm

The first McDonald's restaurant in Des Plaines, Illinois, the McDonald's No. 1 Store Museum; in 1955 the company had 1,000 customers per day, in 2000 the company had 43m per day; 10,000 years ago the first agriculture began in the Middle East and China; anthropologist Alan Macfarlane, of the University of Cambridge, in Nepal; the cow was human's first 'machine'; in 4000 BC, domesticated animals were found only in Eurasia; in the rest of the world animals were only hunted; animals in Africa, South America and Australia were less tame than elsewhere; developed agriculture led to population increase, and surplus time for 'hobbies' and skilled crafts, such as clothmaking and iron smelting; cities only developed in Eurasia; writing possibly developed for financial transactions; hunter-gatherer societies did not develop writing, but sang communal songs instead for communication; the Chinese language has 80,000 characters; the Robert Smail's Printing Works in the Scottish Borders; in 1788 the native Australian population was 300,00, by 1888 it was 50,000; 168 Spanish overcame 80,000 Incas; previously the only domesticated animals in South America were llamas in the Andes, and turkeys in Mexico; European settlers brought deadly diseases to natives around the world, who had no resistance in their immune systems; the Mandan natives were soon killed off by smallpox in 1781; in 1492 there were 5m native Americans, by 1900 there were 250,000; the native bison was replaced by European cattle from the 1830s; in 1800 there was 40m North American buffalo, by 1900 there was only 1,000; the railway appeared in England at the same time, which would soon connect America, centred on Chicago, which would become known for its meat trade; the meat factory process lines led to other factory mass production process lines; but the European approach did not greatly rever natural systems or conservation;

== See also ==
- Seven Wonders of the Industrial World
