= Crime Team =

British television series

- Genre: True crime, documentary
- Directed by: Rob Coldstream; Jeremy Jeffs
- Presented by: Jerome Lynch QC
- Country of origin: United Kingdom
- Original language: English
- No. of episodes: 9

Production
- Producer: Tom Whitter
- Running time: 60 minutes
- Production company: Flame Television

Original release
- Network: Channel 4
- Release: 22 April 2001 – 19 July 2003

Crime Team was a British television series which ran for nine episodes between 2001 and 2003. It originally aired on Channel 4 and was hosted by practicing Queen's Counsel lawyer Jerome Lynch. The premise of the show was that two celebrity guests were presented with historical murders, and were given three days to solve the mystery based on the evidence available. Lynch guided them through the investigation and provided the historical and legal context of the crime for the audience. Crime scenes were reconstructed for the investigators and some aspects were re-enacted for the audience. Scientific experts assisted in presenting forensic evidence.

== Series ==
A one-off pilot was produced in 2001 in which private detective Noel Hogan, investigative journalist Yasmin Pasha and a crime writer Frances Fyfield were given four days to solve a series of 19th century murders. It was broadcast on 22 April of that year. Soon after, a series of 8 episodes was commissioned in 2002. The show was not renewed.

== Episodes ==
Crime Team episodes
Episode	Title	Original broadcast date	Crime	Investigators
Pilot	The Strychnine Poisoner	22 April 2001	Murders by Thomas Neill Cream.	Noel Hogan, Yasmin Pasha, Frances Fyfield
1	The Cut-Throat Killer	9 September 2002	Child murder by Constance Kent.	Ann Widdecombe, John O'Farrell
2	The Baby in the Bullrushes	16 September 2002	Child murders by Amelia Dyer.	Robert Elms, Yasmin Pasha
3	The Body in the Trunk	30 September 2002	The Brighton trunk murders.	Ken Follett, Rowan Pelling
4	The Box Office Hit	7 October 2002	The Bow cinema murder of 1934.	Liza Tarbuck, John Sergeant
5	The Bournemouth Lady Killer	14 June 2003	Murders committed by Thomas Henry Allaway.	Brian Sewell, Martina Cole
6	Who Wants to Kill a Millionaire?	5 July 2003	Murder of Thomas Thynne.	Janet Street-Porter, Paul Daniels
7	Trouble At Mill	12 July 2003	Poisonings by Mary Bateman.	Sean Hughes, Jane Goldman
8	The Dead Man of Drumbeg	19 July 2003	Murder of Murdoch Grant.	Jenny Eclair, Roger Cook
