= Lip Synch (series) =

Lip Synch is a series of five 1989-1990 short films made by Aardman Animations which used vox pops as inspiration for their subject matter. They were commissioned by Channel 4. Nick Park's contribution to the series was the film Creature Comforts, which later won the Academy Award for Best Animated Short of 1990. Channel 4 screened the films as part of their Four-Mations UK season in November 1990.

Peter Lord said:

"We wanted other people who work here to direct, rather than just David and I, which was the historical situation. We wanted Nick Park and Richard Goleszowski to make one each. Barry Purves was doing a lot of freelance work for us at that time, and we wanted him to make one, because he is a very good animator. Effectively, they were given their head. There was a plan at one stage to make the series much more coherent, working to the same theme but somehow that got lost along the way, and everyone did pretty well what they wanted. It was our project so we took a great interest in it, but we didn’t actually seek to influence them very much. I am very pleased with it because of that, and see it as a great virtue, now."

== Films ==
=== Creature Comforts ===
Directed by Nick Park Winner for Academy Award for Best Animation Short Film

=== War Story ===
Directed by Peter Lord

=== Next ===
Directed by Barry Purves

=== Going Equipped ===
Directed by Peter Lord

=== Ident ===
Directed by Richard Starzak
