= Masters and Servants (TV series) =

- Country of origin: United Kingdom

Production
- Running time: 60 minutes

Original release
- Network: Channel 4
- Release: 2003

Masters and Servants is a reality television show by RDF Media, which aired in the summer of 2003 on Channel 4 in the United Kingdom. There were four episodes. The show has not since been recommissioned.

== Synopsis ==
Two families who have never met take it in turns where one family become servants in the master's home for a week, then in the following week they swap roles, often with explosive results. In turn each family is given the chance to experience the pleasures of having servants to do everything for them. The show sees how the families cope giving and receiving orders.

The servants are obliged to wear humiliating uniforms, and abide to rules set by their masters; signing a "binding" contract outlining their duties.

Arguments usually take place the second week, when the first family to serve become masters and take the opportunity to exact their revenge. Disputes tended to be so intense, that families would pull out early before the two-week experiment could end.

== Episodes ==
Titles named after the families

- Episode 1: Nutleys & Allen-Stevens
- Episode 2: Roses & Mills
- Episode 3: Hastings-Evans & Mehtas
- Episode 4: Parnells & Stowells

== Controversy ==
It emerged in 2007 that RDF Media were accused of distorting footage "of a woman being taken to hospital after an accident on set to create the impression she had stormed off in a fury" in episode one

== Airings ==
The show has aired in Australia, and been repeated in the UK on the Biography Channel.

US broadcaster Warner Brothers were said to be interested in the format and intended to develop their own version of the show, although slightly different with friends in different social backgrounds taking part instead of families.

== Related shows ==
The format of Masters and Servants is similar to the "swap" style reality shows such as Holiday Showdown and Wife Swap also made by RDF Media.
