= Love in the Afternoon (game show) =

- Genre: Game show
- Presented by: Antoine de Caunes; Carolyn Marshall; Maria McErlane
- Country of origin: United Kingdom
- Original language: English
- No. of series: 1
- No. of episodes: 16

Production
- Executive producer: Richard Godfrey
- Producer: Courtney Gibson
- Running time: 43-44 minutes
- Production company: Rapido TV

Original release
- Network: Channel 4
- Release: 30 October 1995 – 14 February 1996

Love in the Afternoon is a short-lived game show, presented by Antoine de Caunes, Carolyn Marshall and Maria McErlane, which ran for only one series and 16 episodes from 30 October 1995 to 14 February 1996.
