= Tim Shaw (presenter) =

British radio DJ

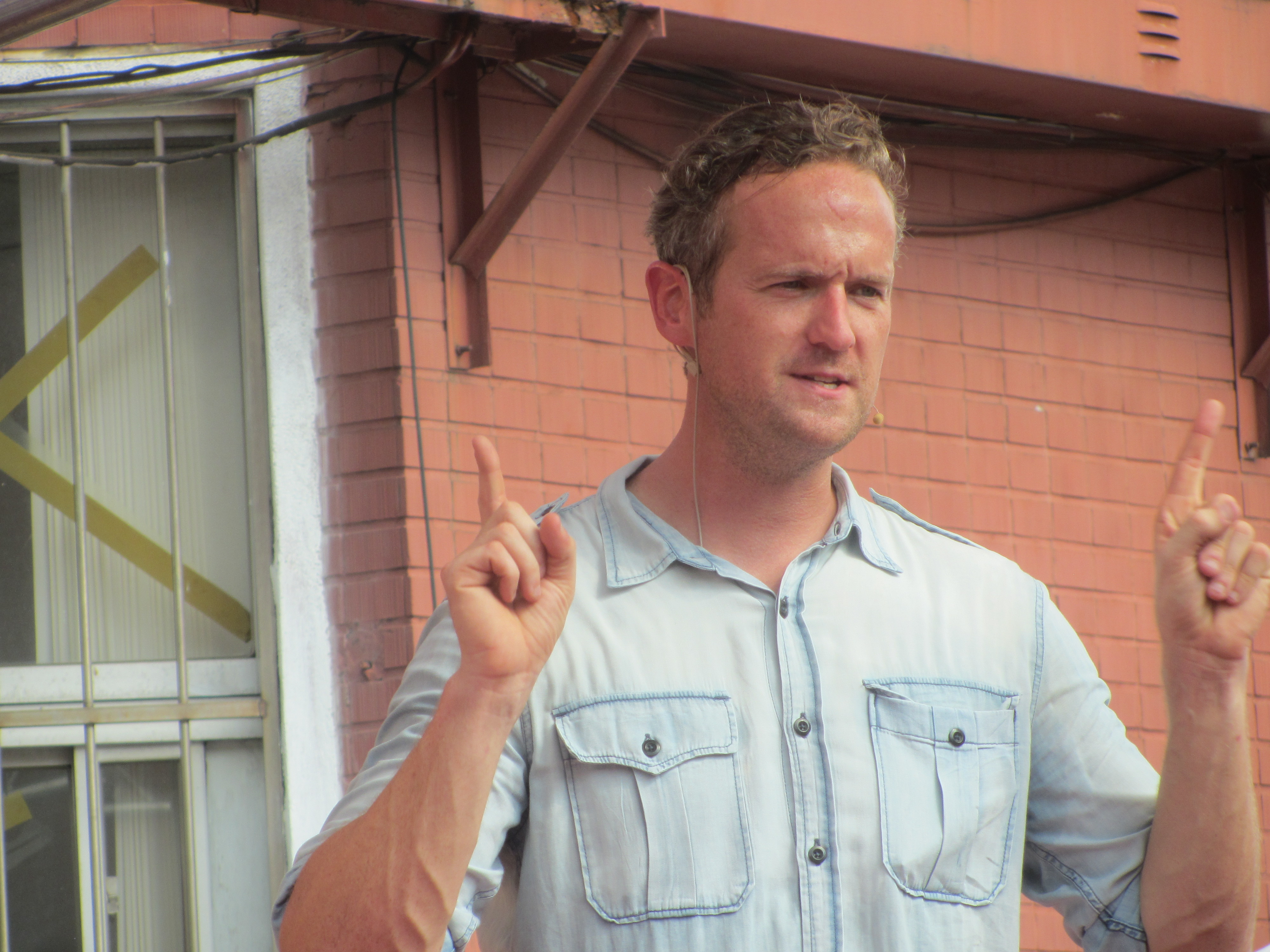
- Shaw in Taipei, Taiwan
- Born: 9 June 1974 (age 52)
- Occupations: Radio host, TV presenter, engineer
- Known for: Street Genius (None of the Above); Car SOS; True Tube; Tim Shaw's Asylum (Kerrang! Radio); The Morning After (Kerrang! Radio); Balls of Steel; Fifth Gear; Absolution (Absolute Radio); Tim Shaw's Rehab (BRMB); How To Win At Everything Experimental
- Height: 6 ft 5 in (196 cm)
- Children: 2
- Website: timshaw.co.uk

Tim Shaw (born 9 June 1974) is a British radio host, TV presenter and engineer. He is currently hosting a selection of factual engineering and science TV series on the National Geographic TV channel in both the US and International territories. He previously hosted TV series in the UK for Channel 4, Channel 5, More4, Virgin1, Discovery and Current TV. He was “Mr Inappropriate” in the cult British prank show Balls of Steel.

== Early life ==
Before pursuing a career in radio and television, he studied Mechanical Engineering and Product Design at university. He has a degree in Professional Broadcasting.

== Career ==
=== Radio ===
In 2005, Shaw and his then colleague Greg Prebble performed a mock burglary at the Sutton Coldfield home of Kerrang Radio's then station director, Andrew Jeffries, live on air. The living room was sprayed with obscene graffiti and a window smashed. The stunt resulted in Shaw being suspended by the station.

Shaw was dismissed from Kerrang Radio on 23 April 2008 as the result of an Ofcom investigation into the running of an on-air competition. OFCOM found that in a competition to give two tickets to a Rolling Stones documentary, Shaw had planned to award the tickets to a friend, pre-record his "entry" and play it "as live" instead of running a genuine competition.

== Awards ==
Year	Awards	Nominated work	Award	Result
2006	New York International Radio Programme Awards	Tim Shaw's Asylum	Best Regularly Scheduled Comedy Program	Bronze
2006	New York International Radio Programme Awards	Tim Shaw's Asylum	Best Comedy/Humor Personality: Local	Silver
2007	New York International Radio Programme Awards	Tim Shaw for Breakfast. Kiss100	Best Innovative Show	Gold
2007	New York International Radio Programme Awards	Tim Shaw's Asylum	Regularly Sched. Talk Program	Gold
2007	New York International Radio Programme Awards	Tim Shaw's Asylum	Talk Special: Interview	Gold
2009	Sony Radio Awards	Tim Shaw’s Absolution	The Entertainment Award	Bronze
2010	New York International Radio Programme Awards	Tim Shaw's Rehab on BRMB	Show Imaging	Bronze
