= Four-Mations =

Four-Mations was a regular animation strand broadcast in the United Kingdom on Channel 4 in the 1990s. The series featured short animated films, tributes, and sometimes a documentary on animation. The series was notable for co-financing some films and broadcasting animated films from around the world. The series was first broadcast in 1990 and finished in 1998.

In 2008 a website made for people to upload, view and share animated films and games 4mations, borrowing the 4 Mation title.

== Notable animations ==
Notable animations broadcast as part of 4 Mations:

- George Pal – Puppetoons
- Knick Knack in its uncut form
- Red's Dream
- Tin Toy
- Luxo Jr.
- Films by Candy Guard – Fatty Issues, Hair, Alternative Fringe etc.
- Nick Park – Creature Comforts
- Daddie's Little Piece of Dresden China
- Films by David Anderson such as Deadsy and The Door
- Ah Pook Is Here
- The Springer and the SS by Jiří Trnka
- Dianne Jackson - The Snowman, Granpa and Father Christmas
- Paul Driessen – Tip Top, Elbowing, The Killing of an Egg, Sunny Side Up, On Land, at Sea and in the Air etc.
- Bob Godfrey – Do It Yourself Cartoon Kit, Henry 9 To 5, It's a square world, Alf, Bill and Fred
- Paul Klee – Taking a Line for a walk
- Bill Plympton – Push Comes to Shove
- Phil Mulloy – Cowboys
- Chage and Aska – On Your Mark
- Yellow Submarine
- The Smurfs – I've Got a Little Puppy
- The Blue Gum Boy (film) (Banned Fourmation)
