= Thomas Webster =

Thomas or Tom Webster may refer to:

- Sir Thomas Webster, 1st Baronet (1679–1751), English MP
- Thomas Webster (painter) (1800–1886), English figure painter
- Thomas Webster (lawyer) (1810–1875), English lawyer
- Sir Thomas Lonsdale Webster (1868–1930), British civil servant
- T. B. L. Webster (Thomas Bertram Lonsdale Webster, 1905–1974), English archaeologist
- Thomas Webster (sailor) (1910–1981), American Olympic sailor
- Thomas Webster (geologist) (1772–1844), Scottish geologist
- Tom Webster (ice hockey) (1948–2020), Canadian ice hockey player and coach
- Tom Webster (cartoonist) (1886–1962), British cartoonist and caricaturist
- Tom Webster (politician) (born 1950), former Labor Party member of the New South Wales Legislative Assembly
- Tom Webster (rugby union) (1920–1972), New Zealand rugby union player
- Thomas J. Webster (born 1971), American engineer
- Tom Webster (architect), British-born New Zealand architect and television presenter

== See also ==
- Thomas Webster Rammell (died 1879), English engineer
