= EcoVelocity =

Annual motor show in London

Programme cover from 2012 show

EcoVelocity was an annual motor show in London that focusses on electric and low-carbon cars. The first show in 2011 was launched at Battersea Power Station, and the 2012 show was located at the ExCel exhibition centre. It was renamed Future Drive Motor Show for 2013, but this was subsequently cancelled.

== 2011 show ==
The first show took place between 8–11 September at the Battersea Power station in West London. The show featured 17 marques including Tesla, Toyota and Nissan, and organised 7,000 on-site test drives. Overall visitor numbers were 8,700 and the show was organised by Metro newspaper and International Green Motor Events.

== 2012 show ==
The second show took place between 10–13 May at the East London ExCel exhibition centre and was organised by Media 10 following their acquisition of IGME in February 2012. By co-locating with the Grand Designs exhibition, numbers were up seven-fold to nearly 58,000 visitors.

== 2013 show ==
At the end of 2012 the show organisers announced that the 2013 EcoVelocity show would be reformatted and incorporated into the new Future Drive Motor Show, but remain at the London ExCeL centre and would be held between 5–12 May.

Only four weeks before the show, Future Drive was cancelled by Media 10 due to a lack of exhibitors signed up.
