= Don't Look Down (TV series) =

- Developed by: Talkback Productions
- Presented by: Kevin McCloud
- Country of origin: United Kingdom
- Original language: English
- No. of series: 1
- No. of episodes: 6

Production
- Executive producers: Peter Fincham; Nicola Moody
- Running time: 30 minutes

Original release
- Network: BBC Two
- Release: 18 May – 22 June 2000

Related
- Grand Designs

Don't Look Down is a BBC Two documentary television series written and presented by Kevin McCloud which ran for six episodes beginning in May 2000.

Each episode is a documentary about the history of famous tall buildings in the United Kingdom; the Forth Bridge, Salisbury Cathedral, the Lloyd's building, Trellick Tower, the Lovell Telescope at Jodrell Bank Observatory and Liverpool Cathedral. McCloud looks at the buildings' construction, architecture and history, but with the twist that part of the episode featured McCloud climbing the outside of the building as a way to conquer his fear of heights. McCloud filmed the series around his fortieth birthday, claiming that it was an excellent way to remain fit.

The series was aired again on the Discovery Channel in the UK during 2009 where it was retitled Kevin McCloud's UK Superstructures.
