= Jo Hamilton (interior designer) =

British interior designer

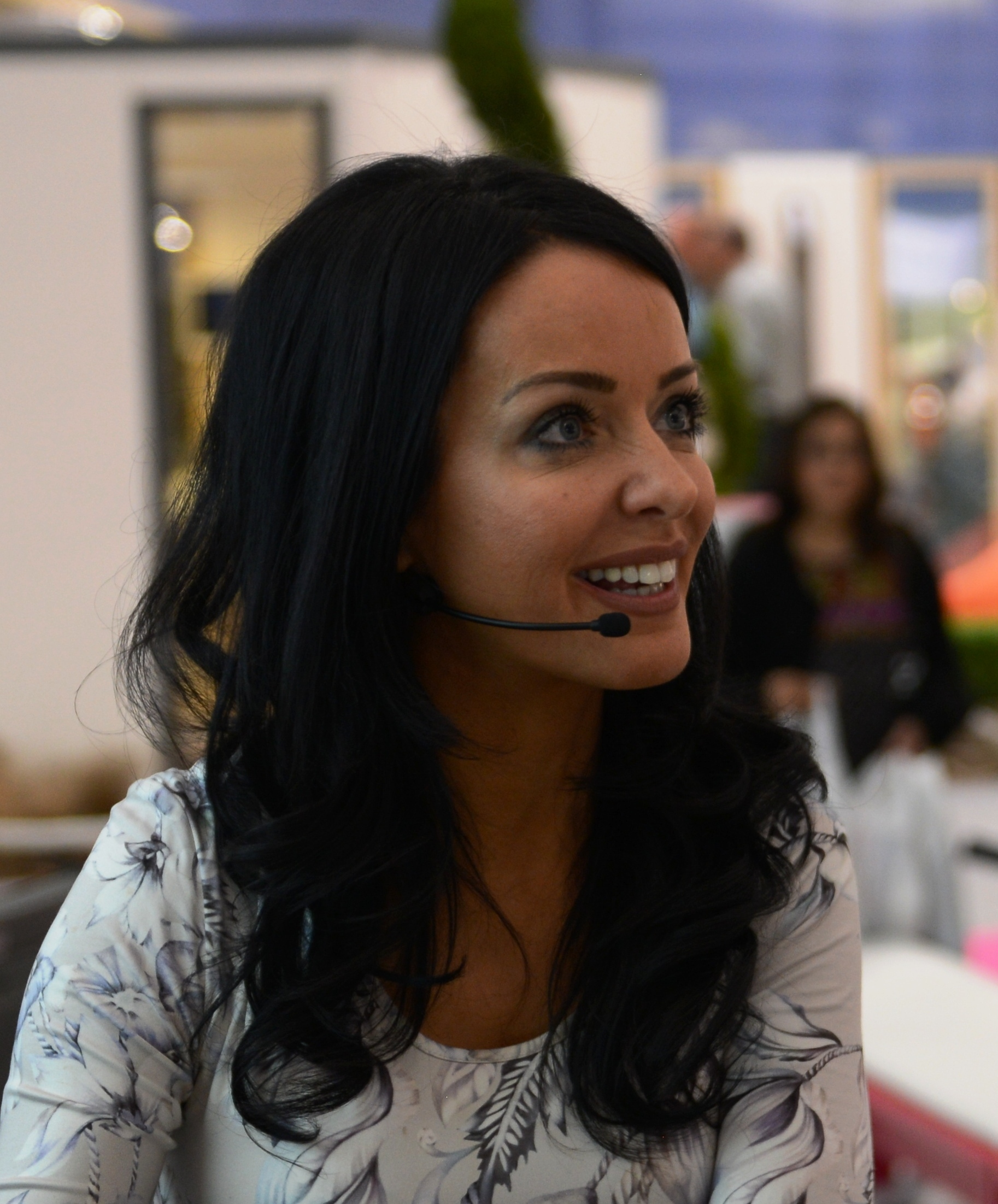
- Born: 1969 (ages 56-57); Eton, Berkshire, England
- Father: Brian Clarke
- Website: johamilton.co.uk

Jo Hamilton (born 1969 in Eton, Berkshire) is a British interior designer. She is the founder and creative director of Jo Hamilton Interiors. Hamilton has been a show ambassador and key speaker for House, in Dublin's RDS, and the Index Exhibition, in Dubai's World Trade Centre. She was also the long-term resident interior designer at Grand Designs Live in both London and Birmingham as well as a key speaker and one of three "show ambassadors" along with Kevin McCloud and Charlie Luxton, and formerly George Clarke.

Further speaking appointments have included London's Decorex, the International Contemporary Furniture Fair (ICFF), in New York City, and the International Property Awards, for which she is a judge. Hamilton has also served as a judge for the What House? Awards and the Index Architecture and Design Awards.

Hamilton has appeared on Sky Living series Who'd Be a Billionaire?, BBC's What To Do With The House (When The Kids Leave) and ITV's 60-Minute Makeover.

Hamilton regularly features in articles about interior design by media outlets that have included The Independent, the Daily Telegraph, The Times, Irish Independent, Metro, and the BBC, among others.

She has worked on interior design-related PR activities with a number of respected companies including Jacaranda Carpets and Rugs and homewares chain HomeSense who in 2014 commissioned her to open a series of new stores across England. Hamilton has also been a brand ambassador for Bosch (home appliance brand) and Dulux.

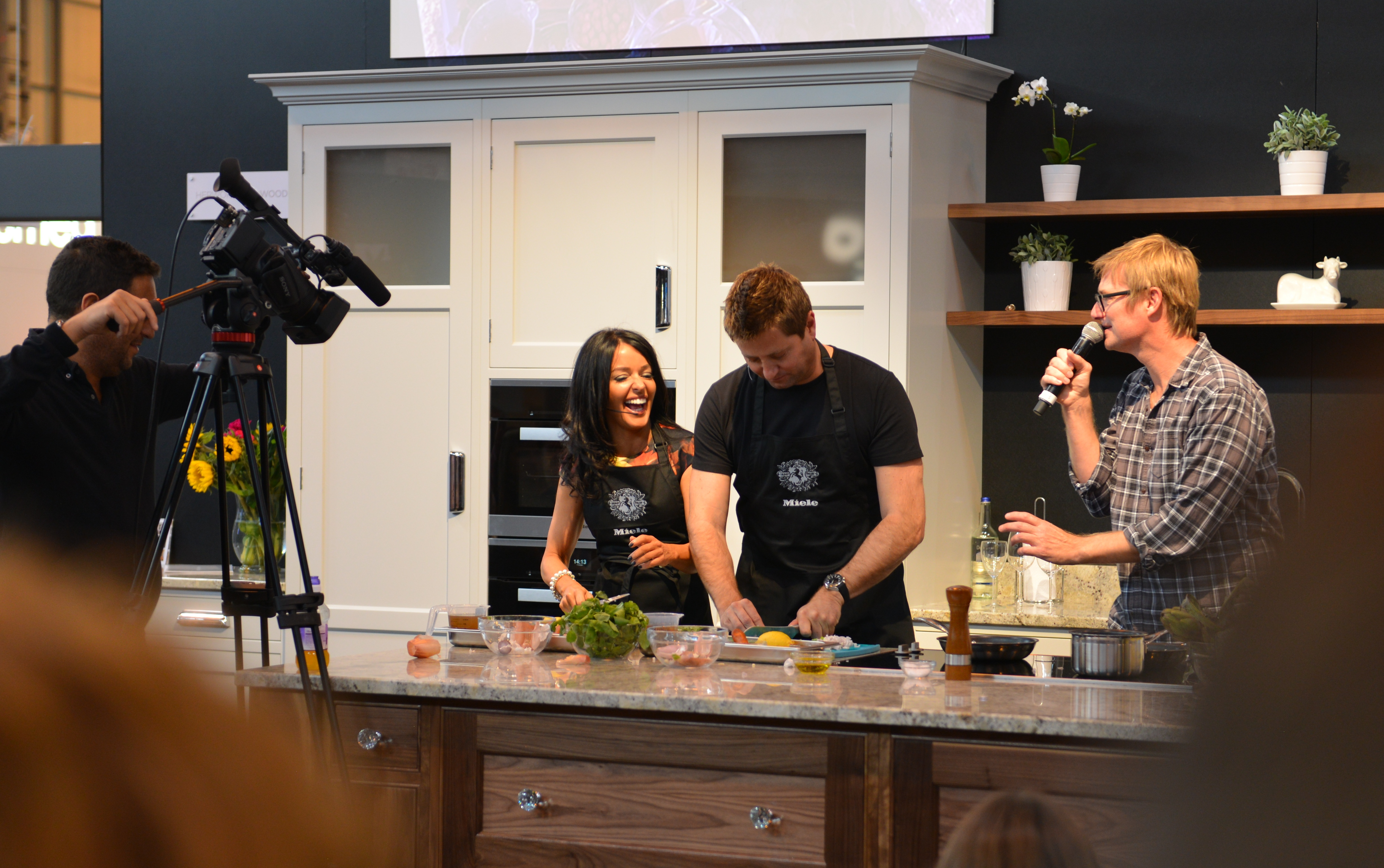
Grand Designs Live show ambassadors Jo Hamilton and George Clarke compete in a 'cook-off'

She became an interior designer in 1995 with a brief professional background in graphic design.

Her father, the author and journalist Brian Clarke, wrote a monthly column for The Times for a number of years on fly-fishing and the environment.
