= Ecohouse (disambiguation) =

An ecohouse is an environmentally low-impact home.

Ecohouse may also refer to:

- The First Ecological House, an experimental housing unit at Thames Polytechnic - see Street Farm
- The Ecology House, a housing unit at Cornell University's North Campus - see Cornell North Campus
- A 1999 episode of the British television series Grand Designs - see List of Grand Designs episodes
- An episode of This is Emily Yeung - see List of This Is Emily Yeung episodes
