= The Wooden Box =

The Wooden Box may refer to

- The Wooden Box (album), a box set of Opeth's first three albums
- The Wooden Box (film), 2006 Spanish-Portuguese black comedy film
- "The Wooden Box", a 2003 episode of Grand Designs

== See also ==
- Wooden box, a kind of wooden container
