= Grand Designs =

British television series

- Presented by: Kevin McCloud
- Theme music composer: David Lowe
- Country of origin: United Kingdom
- Original language: English
- No. of series: 22
- No. of episodes: 159 (list of episodes)

Production
- Running time: 60 minutes
- Production companies: Talkback (1999–2006); Talkback Thames (2006–11, 2025–); Boundless (2012–20); Naked Television (2021–25)

Original release
- Network: Channel 4
- Release: 29 April 1999 – present

Related
- Kevin McCloud's Man Made Home; Grand Designs: Deconstructed

Grand Designs is a British television series that has broadcast on Channel 4 since 29 April 1999 and is presented by Kevin McCloud.

== Format ==
Episodes generally follow a regular format, with small variations depending on the progress of the build. At the beginning of an episode, McCloud meets the clients embarking on the project; he visits the site with them, and discusses the plans for the building. A computer visualisation or computer-aided design view of the intended project is shown. Once ground work commences, he visits the site periodically, following the build progress, noting any changes, hitches or delays; the build frequently runs over budget and completes later than scheduled. McCloud will often do a piece to camera concentrating on any unique materials or features in the house. He visits again once the building is made watertight, and the first and second fixes have commenced. He makes a final visit to the site in its finished or near-finished state, once the occupants have moved in. A tour of the house is then given; McCloud brings the episode to a close summarising the house, its construction, and his opinions.

If a house is not completed before filming finishes, it will sometimes be revisited in a later episode. In more recent series, McCloud revisits past unfinished builds once they have been completed and may stay overnight.

The properties featured in Grand Designs are hugely varied in style and design, from underground homes to converted water towers to buildings constructed in methods of sustainable architecture; the only common factor is that they are all unusual or extravagant. The most popular episode of the series for both Kevin McCloud and viewers was Series 3, Episode 3 with Ben Law's home and a sweet chestnut frame made from his own woodland costing very little.

== Transmissions ==
Series	Episodes	Originally released	
Series	Episodes	First released	Last released
1	8	29 April 1999	24 June 1999
2	8	17 July 2001	4 September 2001
3	8	12 February 2003	1 October 2003
4	7	21 January 2004	10 March 2004
5	20	6 April 2005	16 May 2007
6	7	16 January 2008	2 April 2008
7	8	28 January 2009	8 April 2009
8	8	15 September 2010	3 November 2010
9	7	14 September 2011	26 October 2011
10	8	12 September 2012	7 November 2012
11	9	4 September 2013	30 October 2013
12	7	3 September 2014	15 October 2014
13	7	9 September 2015	21 October 2015
14	8	21 September 2016	17 November 2016
15	8	6 September 2017	25 October 2017
16	6	19 September 2018	24 October 2018
17	6	4 September 2019	9 October 2019
18	5	6 January 2021	3 February 2021
19	7	1 September 2021	13 October 2021
20	7	31 August 2022	12 October 2022
21	5	27 September 2023	8 November 2023
22	5	25 September 2024	23 October 2024
23	8	26 March 2025	29 October 2025
24	4	16 September 2026	7 October 2026

== International versions ==
- Grand Designs Australia premiered on 21 October 2010 in Australia on The LifeStyle Channel.
- Grand Designs New Zealand

hosted by Chris Moller for its first six seasons, premiered on 4 October 2015 in New Zealand on TV3. The first season consisted of 8 x 60 minutes episodes. The second season premiered on 25 September 2016 and also consisted of 8 x 60 minutes episodes. A third season of eight episodes aired in 2017.

- Grand Designs Sweden (or Grand Designs Sverige)

hosted by architecture critic Mark Isitt. It is broadcast by TV4, which also screens the British, Australian and New Zealand versions of the show. Each season consists of 6 x 44 minute episodes which air weekly. Season one premiered on 16 November 2020; season two on 22 November 2021; season three on 27 October 2022; and season four on 14 August 2024. A fifth season premiered on 30 July 2025. A spin off series, Grand Design Sweden – Renovations (Grand Designs Renoveringar), presented by Mark Isitt and designer Fredrik Paulsen, focuses on home renovation projects. The series of 8 x 44 minute episodes, premiered on 6 May 2025.

- Grand Designs Finland (2022)

== DVDs ==
DVD title	Discs	Year	Episodes	Release date
The Complete Series One	2	1999	8	25 October 2004
The Complete Series Two	2	2001	8	5 January 2009
Series Three	2	2003	7	17 July 2006
Series Four	2	2004	7	5 May 2008
Series Five – Volume One	2	2005–2006	8	16 March 2009
Series Five – Volume Two	2	2006–2007	8	27 April 2009
Series Five – Volume Three	1	2007	4	5 October 2009
Series Six	2	2008	6	26 April 2010
Series Seven	2	2009	7	27 September 2010
Series Eight	2	2010	8	5 September 2011
Series Nine	2	2011	8	15 October 2012
Series Ten	2	2012	8	30 September 2013
Series Eleven	2	2013	9	29 September 2014

== Exhibition ==
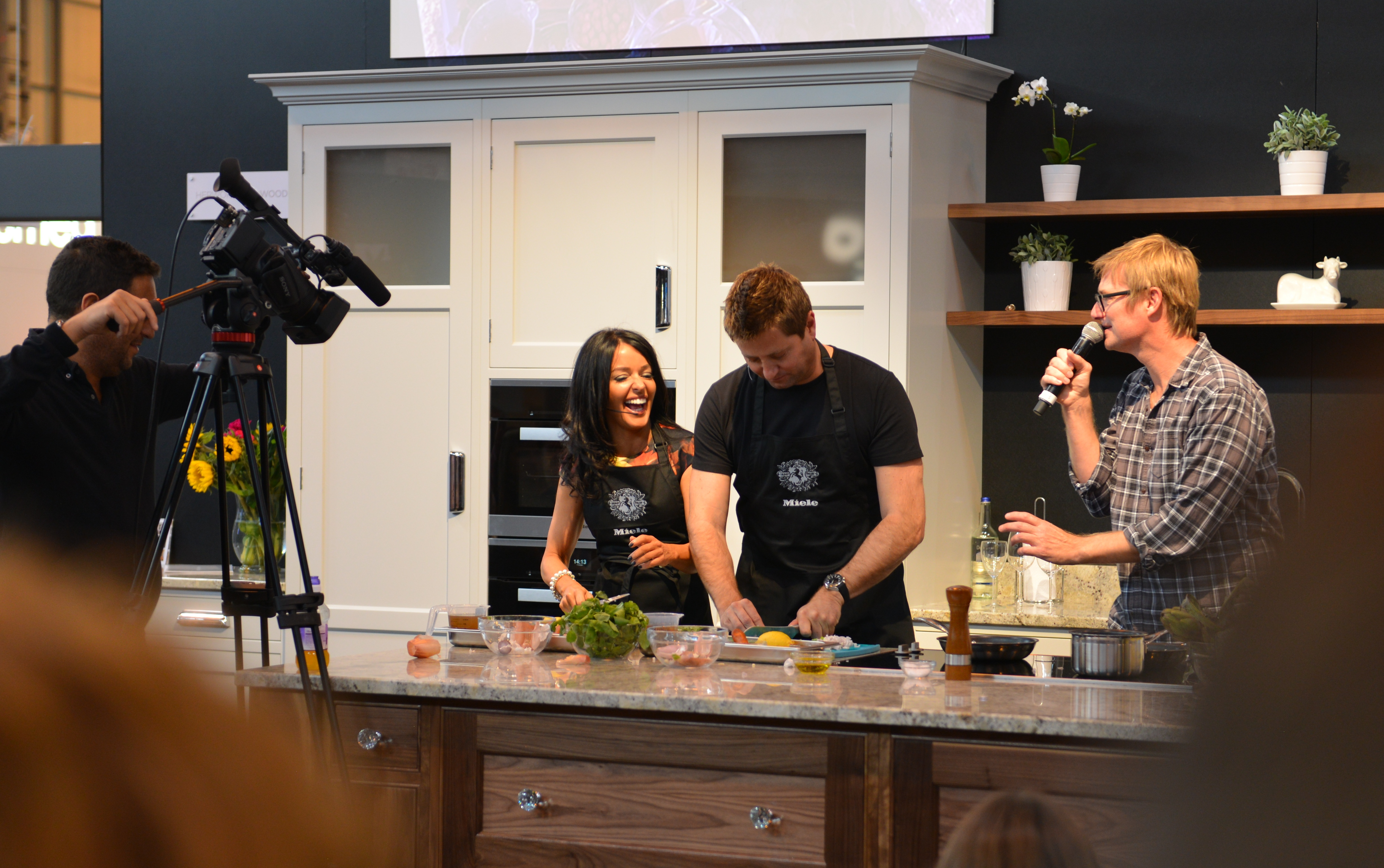
Grand Designs Live ambassadors Jo Hamilton and George Clarke compete in a 'cook-off'

Grand Designs Live takes place biannually, in London in the spring and in Birmingham in the autumn. The exhibitions display contemporary design and technology for the home and garden, with stands for suppliers and manufacturers to promote their goods and services. Design and media personalities McCloud, George Clarke and Jo Hamilton are show ambassadors.

The nine-day Grand Designs Live 2008 event, held at London's ExCeL, attracted over 100,000 visitors. To accompany the event Channel 4 broadcast two live daily programmes directly from the show, Grand Designs Live: Today and Grand Designs Live.

Grand Designs Live launched in Australia in Sydney on 21–23 October 2011. It launched in Melbourne on 21–23 September 2012 and returned to Sydney on 5–7 October 2012.

== Awards and nominations ==
The programme has been nominated a number of times in the BAFTA Features category and won in 2015.

Year	Award	Category	Recipient	Results	Ref.
2000	BAFTA TV Awards	Features	Daisy Goodwin, John Silver	Nominated	
2004	BAFTA TV Awards	Features	John Silver, Daisy Goodwin, Kevin McCloud	Nominated	
2008	BAFTA TV Craft Awards	Director – Factual	Livia Russell	Nominated	
2013	BAFTA TV Awards	Features	Production Team	Nominated	
2014	BAFTA TV Awards	Features	Kevin McCloud, Fiona Caldwell, Rob Gill, John Lonsdale	Nominated	
2015	BAFTA TV Awards	Features	Production Team	Won	
