= Brian Clarke (author) =

British author, journalist and angler (1938–2026)

- Born: James Brian Clarke; 28 May 1938; Darlington, County Durham, England
- Died: 14 March 2026 (aged 87)
- Occupations: Author, journalist, angler
- Children: 3, including Jo
- Writing career
- Notable work: The Pursuit of Stillwater Trout, The Trout and the Fly, The Stream

James Brian Clarke (28 May 1938 – 14 March 2026) was an English author, journalist and angler. He wrote two works on fly-fishing (The Pursuit of Stillwater Trout, 1975, and (with John Goddard) The Trout and the Fly, 1980). His environmental novel The Stream (2000) was described by David Arnold-Forster, chief executive of English Nature, as "the most significant book of its kind that I have read since Rachel Carson's Silent Spring". The Stream became the first work of fiction to win the international Natural World Book Prize, Britain's environmental book award and, in the same year, was named Best First Novel by a British writer by the UK Authors' Club. Clarke was Angling Correspondent of The Sunday Times from 1975 to 1996, and was Angling Correspondent of The Times from 1991.

== Life and career ==
James Brian Clarke was born in Darlington, County Durham on 28 May 1938. He educated at St Mary's Grammar School, Darlington. His early career in journalism included five years with The Guardian in London (1962–1967). A brief period as a management consultant followed, before he spent 17 years with IBM in a range of managerial and senior professional roles.

His lifelong interest in angling began with sticklebacks and minnows on the River Skerne as a child, then moved on to coarse fishing on the Tees and Swale. He took up fly-fishing in the mid-1960s and was completely self-taught. His first book, The Pursuit of Stillwater Trout, was based on an examination of the nymphs he found in autopsies of trout, on detailed study of living specimens of the same nymphs that he stocked in an aquarium and on an analysis of trout rise-forms. The imitative approach the book advocated – small nymphs fished in a naturalistic way on long leaders – had a transforming influence on lake fishing for trout at a time when most lake fly-fishing was done with large lures and traditional Scottish and Irish lake patterns. The Pursuit of Stillwater Trout was serialised by The Sunday Times and was described by Fly Fishing and Fly Tying magazine as "the most important book on the subject that has ever been written". Richard Walker, writing in Trout Fisherman magazine in 1980, described The Trout and the Fly as "A great work. Likely to prove the most important contribution to the literature of trout fishing, this century".

The book recorded the experiments Clarke and John Goddard conducted on the way the reflection and refraction of light influence the world as the trout sees it and involved much underwater photography. Although each is widely read in his own right, the names of Clarke and Goddard are permanently linked through the book and through The Educated Trout (1980), a 50-minute film in the BBC Television series The World About Us that documented their researches.

As a columnist for The Times and The Sunday Times, Clarke fished and travelled widely. He caught salmon in Russia, sea trout in Tierra del Fuego, rainbow trout in Alaska, marlin in the Indian Ocean, tigerfish in southern Africa and bonefish in the central Pacific. He wrote extensively on other forms of wildlife and the remote wilderness.

Clarke was the first President of The Wild Trout Trust (2003–2008). He was elected an Honorary Life Member of The Flyfishers' Club in 2005. Who's Who lists his non-angling interests as "walking, photography and sitting still in the countryside, watching and listening."

One of Clarke's three daughters is the interior designer Jo Hamilton.

Clarke died of complications following a chest infection on 14 March 2026, at the age of 87.

== Published works ==
- The Pursuit of Stillwater Trout (1975)
- The Trout and The Fly – jointly – (1980)
- Fly-fishing for Trout (US) – jointly – (1993)
- Trout etcetera – selected writings, 1982–1996 (1996)
- The Stream (novel) 2000
- Understanding Trout Behaviour (US) – jointly – (2002)
- On Fishing – journalism and essays, 1996–2007 (2007)
