= Tom Webster (architect) =

New Zealand architect and television host

- Born: Liverpool, England
- Occupations: TV presenter, architect
- Known for: Grand Designs New Zealand (2022–present)
- Spouse: Anna Webster
- Children: 2

Thomas John Webster is a British-born New Zealand architect and television presenter. He is best known for presenting Grand Designs New Zealand since 2022.

== Career ==
Tom Webster was born in Liverpool, grew up in Bath and studied architecture in Wales. He worked in New Zealand in the late 2000s, then returned to the United Kingdom. He has previously worked for Google and at Windsor Castle. After returning to New Zealand in 2016, he was a project architect with Cheshire Architects for the Hotel Britomart development. He is a registered architect and now runs an architectural practice, focusing on domestic builds and renovations.

== Personal life ==
Webster lives on the North Shore of Auckland. He is married and has two sons.

== TV appearances ==
Chris Moller, the original presenter of Grand Designs New Zealand, decided to step away from that role after the sixth season. Webster's role was first announced in February 2021, with Webster being quoted that “It was a great opportunity that came to me. Grand Designs was looking for a new presenter for a new era. I had a couple of auditions, and they seemed to like me.”

It was intended that the seventh season, with Webster as the new presenter, would begin airing in early 2022. However, due to the effects of COVID-19, the first episode was not broadcast until October 2022.
