= Grand Designs New Zealand =

New Zealand television series

- Genre: Housing/Building, Garden/Landscape, Reality
- Presented by: Chris Moller (2015-2020); Tom Webster (2022-)
- Country of origin: New Zealand
- Original language: English
- No. of seasons: 10
- No. of episodes: 76

Production
- Production companies: Grundy-Fremantle Media Group, Department of Post

Original release
- Network: TV3 (2015-2020); TVNZ 1 (2022-)
- Release: 4 October 2015 – present

Grand Designs New Zealand is a New Zealand television series. It is based on the British television series Grand Designs and it was originally presented by the architect Chris Moller and aired on TV3. The program began airing on 4 October 2015.

Following Moller's departure after the sixth season, it was confirmed that architect Tom Webster would take over as host from the sixth season in 2022, which would air on TVNZ 1. The eighth series, with Webster as host, began screening on TVNZ 1 on 24 October 2023.

The tenth series began screening on 12 April 2026. Two further series are in production and are due to be screened in 2027 and 2028.

== Format ==
The series' presenter follows the progress of house building projects, as well speaking with the owners and finally by tracking the ups and downs of the design, construction and moving in.

== Series overview ==
Series	Episodes	Originally aired	
Series	Episodes	First aired	Last aired
1	8	4 October 2015	22 November 2015
2	8	25 September 2016	13 November 2016
3	8	19 September 2017	7 November 2017
4	8	3 October 2018	21 November 2018
5	9	11 September 2019	6 November 2019
6	9	14 September 2020	9 November 2020
7	8	18 October 2022	6 December 2022
8	8	24 October 2023	12 December 2023
9	8	27 April 2025	15 June 2025
10	8	12 April 2026	31 May 2026

== Episodes ==
=== Series 1 (2015) ===
No. overall	No. in season	Title	Location	Original release date	Viewers
1	1	"Concrete Farmhouse"	The Catlins, Southland	4 October 2015	N/A
Deer farmer and bachelor Lachlan McDonald is building a three-bedroom concrete home in the hopes to fill it with a family in the future. However, the choice of location is one of the most remote and stormy parts of the country – The Catlins. He's hired a top Auckland architect who is scratching his head at Lachlan's decision to project manage his first build himself. His choice of builder is also a good mate who specialises in constructing local milking sheds. Will this Grand Design be a perfect fusion of passions and experience or are these personalities destined to clash?
2	2	"Earthship"	Tairua, Coromandel Peninsula	11 October 2015	N/A
An Earthship is a non-traditional home built using recycled materials such as bottles and tyres, and even mussel shells for insulation. Young Coromandel couple Gus and Sarah Anning decided to step outside the norm with their Grand Design when they realized they couldn't afford a traditional home. Enlisting the help of community volunteers, both here and overseas and using unique building techniques originally designed for the desert in California, it's not certain how this Grand Design will fare in Coromandel's temperamental climate.
3	3	"Steel House"	Pākiri, Auckland	18 October 2015	N/A
Sydney-based writer Scott Lawrie's plans for his new life in New Zealand are encapsulated in a sculptural steel house he is building on a remote rural hillside behind Pākiri beach. Scott has an unrelenting refusal to compromise on his "legacy", but a budget can only be stretched so far. Will Scott realize his extraordinary dream?
4	4	"American Gothic"	Titirangi, Auckland	25 October 2015	N/A
Fifth generation builder Steve Sygrove and his wife, Chrissy, have a passion for things pretty, floral and pink. Their unique build in the Titirangi bush near Auckland is a handcrafted American Gothic style house complete with ornate detailing like a Juliette balcony, spandrels, a horseshow window, lacework valences, and interior walls made of fabric. Steve rallies against the bureaucracy that is stifling the creativity in his craft and expects this grand dame of a building will be his swansong.
5	5	"45° House"	Wellington	1 November 2015	N/A
Nic Ballara clearly has a head for heights as he starts to build a family home for him and his wife Callie and their 12-year-old daughter. Nic's site in the earthquake prone city of Wellington is so steep that it looks virtually impossible to build on, however Nic is convinced he has a solution and is determined to build his first home there. A logistical nightmare lies ahead as this Grand Design looks to be an uphill battle throughout.
6	6	"Clifftop House"	Hillsborough, Auckland	8 November 2015	N/A
Surfing Pastor Hamish Divett and his psychologist wife Diane have lived by the ocean for years, but in a dark, south-facing house that failed to take full advantage of the beautiful vista. To get the view they desperately desire, the couple have decided to push structural and logical planning to the limits. By building on a crumbling cliff with a sheer drop to the sea below, the Divetts will push their team to the edge to see this Grand Design through to completion.
7	7	"Straw Bale"	Wānaka, Otago	15 November 2015	N/A
After years of living apart with their separate children, Mike and Catherine are finally building an extraordinary straw bale together on top of a rocky outcrop in central Otago. Between them, Mike and Cathy have seven children from their previous marriages. With the last child finally moved out of home, the couple are going to build a Grand Design in which they will live alone together for the first time. They will be calling on Catherine's skills as one of the few female joiners in the country and Mike's talents as an inventor to build a unique straw bale and hemp house on an exposed rocky outcrop near Wanaka.
8	8	"American Barn"	Auckland	22 November 2015	N/A
Timber merchant Marty Verry and his Venezuelan wife Morella have imported two historic New York barn frames that could be considered the oldest buildings in New Zealand. With plans to assemble the barn on the couples' rural site on the outskirts of Auckland, they intend them to become part of a modernist mansion acting as a tribute to the different timber Marty loves. But will the new homes honour the history they are built on or is this Grand Design set to take on a life of its own?

=== Series 2 (2016) ===
No. overall	No. in season	Title	Location	Original release date	Viewers
9	1	"Concreteologist House"	Point Chevalier, Auckland	25 September 2016	N/A
Builder and self-titled concreteologist Ross Bannan plans to push concrete to new limits to create a towering architectural home for his family on the cliffs of Auckland suburb Pt Chevalier.
10	2	"Hemp House"	New Plymouth, Taranaki	2 October 2016	N/A
New Plymouth couple Greg Whitham and Gayle Avery want to build a rustic French farmhouse style home for their extended family and they want to do this using hemp.
11	3	"Rusty House"	Whangārei Heads, Northland	9 October 2016	N/A
Steve Wilson and Wendy Grell want to get out of the city and live the quiet life. So they've demolished the old family holiday home and are building a permanent home in a small, isolated Northland bay.
12	4	"Stilt House"	Kāpiti Coast, Pukerua Bay, Wellington	16 October 2016	N/A
With predicted rising sea levels, Wellington's wild Kāpiti Coastline is in danger of eventually being washed away. But that's not stopping Guy Marriage and his cousins from building an experimental home.
13	5	"French House"	Ponsonby, Auckland	23 October 2016	N/A
The suburb of Ponsonby is full of pretty historic wooden villas and the locals are very protective of them. So when Francophiles Sarah and Philippe Lods decide to build a modernist home they have some challenges ahead.
14	6	"Modern Day Castle"	Queenstown	30 October 2016	N/A
Andy Macbeth and Jo Denton are Christchurch earthquake refugees who are building a new life and modern-day fortress against the elements in alpine Queenstown.
15	7	"Shipping Container Home"	Christchurch	6 November 2016	N/A
Engineer David Fitzmaurice moved to Christchurch with his wife Joyce to work on the reconstruction of the city after the devastating earthquakes and he plans to build a home there from shipping containers.
16	8	"Earthquake Rebuild"	South Brighton, Christchurch	13 November 2016	N/A
A Christchurch family is determined to stay in South Brighton despite ongoing earthquakes, Andrei and Abby Martin are going to demolish their damaged cottage and build a prototype earthquake-proof home that can withstand shakes.

=== Series 3 (2017) ===
No. overall	No. in season	Title	Location	Original release date	Viewers
17	1	"Imitation Villa"	Helensville, Auckland	19 September 2017	N/A
Kelly, a feisty mother of six children persuades them and her husband Joe, to pursue her dream of replicating a Dargaville Mansion she fell in love with as a child.
18	2	"Log Home"	Mount Ruapehu, Waikato	26 September 2017	N/A
Ash, a Te Puke accountant pursues his long held dream of building a log cabin at the base of Ruapehu- despite his architecturally trained daughters' objections.
19	3	"Island Hideaway"	Slipper Island, Waikato, Coromandel Peninsula	3 October 2017	N/A
Sky, a wealthy bachelor is struggling with the spotlight in his small home town of Tairua. He creates a sanctuary for himself and his children on remote Slipper Island.
20	4	"Moving Mansion"	Queenstown	10 October 2017	N/A
Jamie and his wife Melissa go to buy an old stairwell in Christchurch and decide to buy the whole house, dismantle it, and relocate it to Queenstown.
21	5	"Black House"	Nelson	17 October 2017	N/A
George and Yvonne retired to peaceful Nelson to build their dream home. But George, a retired architect, isn't ready to take it easy. He wants to pioneer a new way to build affordable and contemporary house.
22	6	"Vinegar Lane Apartment"	Ponsonby, Auckland	24 October 2017	N/A
Young Auckland couple Brendan and Nikki borrow a fortune to build their first home and along the way face delays, budget blow-outs, and becoming new parents.
23	7	"Canopy House"	Waiheke, Auckland	31 October 2017	N/A
Wedding dress designer Robyn and her husband David are pursuing a dream to build a home that they could one day retire to. Sea views and privacy were at the top of their wish list.
24	8	"Music Box House"	Point Chevalier, Auckland	7 November 2017	N/A
Mahuia Bridgman-Cooper is a musician and composer building a designer home with a built- in recording studio and a performance stage by his parents' house in Auckland's Pt Chevalier.

=== Series 4 (2018) ===
No. overall	No. in season	Title	Location	Original release date	Viewers
25	1	"Britten Stables"	Christchurch	3 October 2018	N/A
Isabel Weston, daughter of world famous motorbike inventor John Britten takes on a daunting endurance test with her husband Tim – restoring the earthquake damaged family home can they pull it off?
26	2	"Jetty House"	Mangawhai, Northland	10 October 2018	N/A
Greg and his partner knock down their old brick home to create a new one, with each brick being individually coloured.
27	3	"Tree House"	Hanmer Springs	17 October 2018	N/A
Ric and Boio make a child hood dream a reality by building a tree-house in a pine forest, in a high wind zone, where trees frequently blow over in winter storms- what could possibly go wrong?
28	4	"Te Arai Lodge"	Te Ārai, Auckland	24 October 2018	N/A
Cathy and Vince Moores strive to create a sumptuous Italian style villa surrounded by beautiful mature gardens, but their budget takes on a life of its own, threatening to turn their long awaited dream into a nightmare.
29	5	"Green House"	Wellington	31 October 2018	N/A
Sustainability experts Karl and Amelie have a dream of a house that is heated solely from the sun. But on a steep, exposed, windy Wellington hillside site they're challenged right from the start.
30	6	"Red House"	Cranmer Square, Christchurch	7 November 2018	N/A
Photographers Johannes and Jo take on a heritage restoration adding a bold architectural statement home next door but will the marriage between the old with the new prove more than they bargained for.
31	7	"Beach House"	Brighton, Dunedin, Otago	14 November 2018	N/A
Young builder Zac wants to save money by building his own home. The problem is he's promised his mum he'll build hers at the same time and both on top of a sand dune. Who'd be mad enough to do that?
32	8	"Pod House"	Kenepuru Sound, Marlborough	21 November 2018	N/A
Kate and Ian want to build a home in the remote Kenepuru sounds. A place tradies won't go to. Answer? Build off site, and truck the home along a dangerous, windy road. Sheer, heart-thumping drama.

=== Series 5 (2019) ===
No. overall	No. in season	Title	Location	Original release date	Viewers
33	1	"The Burnt Timber Pavilion"	Whitford, Auckland	11 September 2019	N/A
Shane and Tina Nicholls design a unique family home using Japanese burnt timber and Scandinavian brick, a special memorial garden, views over the gulf, a wine cellar, a pool, and much more – it’s a truly international affair.
34	2	"Suspended Glass House"	Helensburgh, Dunedin, Otago	18 September 2019	N/A
A site with a river running through it would put most people off. But not Harlem and Nicola who attempt to build a glass-house on a bridge over the water.
35	3	"Wanaka Wedge"	Central Otago	25 September 2019	N/A
Musicians Justine Cormack and Marc Taddei swap their Auckland home for the mountains of Central Otago. They risk all by adapting an American design for the Southern Hemisphere.
36	4	"Beach Escape"	Waipu Cove, Northland	2 October 2019	N/A
David and Tracey Lewis share a passion for art and architecture but don't always share the same opinion. So when they jointly create a home in Waipu Cove, there's a creative clash and a battle over the budget.
37	5	"Taylor's Mistake"	Taylor's Mistake, Christchurch	9 October 2019	N/A
Craig Jarvis's tiny 65 square metre home overlooking Taylor's mistake is Grand Designs longest running house build. Hand built from the ground up, Craig proves he's a man on a mission who will not be defeated.
38	6	"Medieval Castle"	Cust, Christchurch	16 October 2019	N/A
Neil Lawrence is on a quest to build a Medieval castle for his wife and son. Creating a 50-metre long castle wall is just the first of many uphill battles this brave family face as they tackle this huge task.
39	7	"Three Exceptional Grand Designs Revisited"	Titirangi, Auckland; Ponsonby, Auckland; Te Ārai, Auckland	23 October 2019	N/A
Chris Moller takes a tour of three exceptional Grand Designs houses from the last four seasons to see how they've developed and asks whether the huge budget, hard work and heartaches were really worth it. The houses had previously been profiled in "American Gothic" (season 1, episode 4), "Vinegar Lane Apartment" (season 3, episode 6), and "Te Arai Lodge" (season 4, episode 4).
40	8	"Back To The Music Box"	Point Chevalier, Auckland	30 October 2019	N/A
Rerun of season 3, episode 8
41	9	"The Concretelologist Revisited"	Point Chevalier, Auckland	6 November 2019	N/A
Rerun of season 2, episode 1

=== Series 6 (2020) ===
No. overall	No. in season	Title	Location	Original release date	Viewers
42	1	"Grand Tearooms Penthouse"	Auckland	14 September 2020	N/A
Auckland couple Bridget and Steve Varney take on the challenge of converting Farmers' grand tea rooms built in 1930 into a New York style loft
43	2	"Piha Clifftop Retreat"	Piha, Auckland	21 September 2020	N/A
Joseph and Susannah battle storms and complex topography as they attempt to build a coastal paradise on a steep site with stunning view of Piha.
44	3	"Floating Beach Bach"	Paekākāriki, Kāpiti Coast, Wellington	28 September 2020	N/A
Normally, you'd think twice about building extreme beachfront in Paekākāriki... but it's a challenge top industrial designer Mark Pennington is ready to take on! Will Mark and Pip's dream home come to life or get washed away?
45	4	"Feng Shui Palace"	Taiharuru, Whangārei	5 October 2020	N/A
Kim Powell & Boon Yap scour Northland for the perfect spot to build a Feng Shui home. It's a rollercoaster ride.
46	5	"Schist Vineyard"	Immigrant's Vineyard, Alexandra, Otago	12 October 2020	N/A
Roland & Lucienne van der Wal join forces with their son Michael to build a home out of local schist, in the middle of their Central Otago vineyard.
47	6	"Sounds Hideaway"	St Omer Bay, Kenepuru Sound, Marlborough Sounds	19 October 2020	N/A
An off the grid monolith in the Marlborough Sounds is a challenging build. But when you live 12,000 miles way like the O'Briens, it's nigh on impossible.
48	7	"Lighthouse"	Kai Iwi Beach, Whanganui	26 October 2020	N/A
Ex cops Sumita and Cameron Dale want to build a lighthouse with virtually no money. Will they pull it off? And what will the neighbours say?
49	8	"Ultramodern Rooftop Home"	Dunedin	2 November 2020	N/A
Heritage building enthusiasts Ted and Ita Daniels create an ultramodern rooftop apartment on top of one of the City's most beautiful renovations.
50	9	"Copper Curve"	Cass Bay, Lyttelton Harbour / Whakaraupō, Christchurch	9 November 2020	N/A
Aaron and Christine Green create an unconventional, curvaceous creation in Cass Bay. It's as much of an artwork as it is a house, but at what cost?

=== Series 7 (2022) ===
No. overall	No. in season	Title	Location	Original release date	Viewers
51	1	"Chatham Islands"	Chatham Islands	18 October 2022	N/A
After renting the local schoolhouse for 20 years, Chatham Islanders John and Bridget Preece are finally embarking on their own dream build. But will the challenges of building on a remote island prove to be their undoing?
52	2	"Okaihau Family Home"	Ōkaihau	25 October 2022	N/A
In Kerikeri, local weekend market and café owners Warrick and Judy Hyland are building the biggest house they can on a budget.
53	3	"Lake House"	Lake Tarawera	1 November 2022	N/A
On the shores of Lake Tarawera, kiwifruit farmers Stew and Gill Moss are building a final family home in time for Gill's 60th birthday party.
54	4	"Round House"	Waikanae	8 November 2022	N/A
Carefree childhood memories are the inspiration behind 32-year-old James Davis' complex build on the Kāpiti Coast.
55	5	"Container House"	Waiheke Island	15 November 2022	N/A
Tony Hodge discovers that building with the humble container is not as easy as he thought it would be on his vertiginous, bush-clad site on Waiheke Island.
56	6	"Featherston Passive"	Featherston	22 November 2022	N/A
In Featherston, Swedish architect Josefine Watterson tackles the challenge of creating a Passive House for her young family in pursuit of a more sustainable lifestyle.
57	7	"Christchurch Castello"	Ashley, North Canterbury	29 November 2022	N/A
In North Canterbury, Phil Metaxas takes on the ambitious task of completing another man's dream - that of a post-modernist castle.
58	8	"Sand Dune"	Coromandel Peninsula	6 December 2022	N/A
Charles Webster, a man with a passion for technical engineering, and his wife Yvonne pour their energy into creating a home in the shape of a sand dune on the Coromandel Peninsula.

=== Series 8 (2023) ===
No. overall	No. in season	Title	Location	Original release date	Viewers
59	1	"Abel Tasman"	Abel Tasman	24 October 2023	N/A
Mark Ahearn and his Australian restaurateur wife Liz are taking time out from their hectic lives in Perth to build a legacy family holiday home in Abel Tasman.
60	2	"Mangawhai Danish"	Mangawhai	31 October 2023	N/A
Matthew and Rosemarie Dunning are put down roots in Mangawhai and have decided to throw convention out the window by embracing their son's intriguing concept of a brick house in a sand dune.
61	3	"Dunedin Glasshouse"	Dunedin	7 November 2023	N/A
Eternal globetrotter Tessa Kingsbury's dream is to convert an old Dunedin Sunday school into her forever home, but it comes with a twist - she's incorporating a glasshouse into the heart of it.
62	4	"New Brighton"	New Brighton	14 November 2023	N/A
Josh and Esther Perriam have always wanted to build their family home on New Brighton's beachfront but, with a limited budget and on just a slip of land, will the design live up to their dream?
63	5	"Mahurangi Pohuehue"	Mahurangi	21 November 2023	N/A
On a steep site in the wilds of Mahurangi, just north of Auckland, architect Felicity Brenchley is prepared to do whatever it takes to get their family home built.
64	6	"Geraldine"	Geraldine	28 November 2023	N/A
An hour and several river crossings inland from Geraldine is where arborist Li Tane and his horticulturalist wife Michelle are building their rammed earth, off-grid sustainable mountain home.
65	7	"Queenstown"	Queenstown	5 December 2023	N/A
When John and Sharon Russell bought their vertiginous site above Queenstown for their shared-ownership holiday house, they thought their biggest challenge would be signing up other owners.
66	8	"Waitaki Valley"	Waitaki Valley	12 December 2023	N/A
In the Waitaki Valley, Michael and Olivia Pavelitch discover they have their work cut out for them when they embark on breathing life into an historic rabbiters' cottage.

=== Series 9 (2025) ===
No. overall	No. in season	Title	Location	Original release date	Viewers
67	1	"Waiheke Wonder"	Waiheke Island	27 April 2025	N/A
Maria and Dale Gray's plans for an elegant "empty nest" home on Waiheke Island are swamped by a sea of mud and a tsunami of rising construction costs.
68	2	"Lake Ōhau"	Lake Ōhau	4 May 2025	N/A
Janet Muir and Richard Brown's cherished family holiday home at Lake Ōhau is rebuilt after destruction and near-death experience.
69	3	"Concrete Californian"	Mairangi Bay	11 May 2025	N/A
Mark and Cherilyn Rice's concrete, steel and glass citadel above a popular Auckland beach combines austere functionality with luxury living.
70	4	"Waikanae Rammed Earth"	Waikanae	18 May 2025	N/A
Andrew Simpson and Krysty Peebles' dream of a sustainable rammed earth house at Waikanae risks crumbling in the face of building delays and steadily rising costs.
71	5	"Lake Tahoe"	Otago Harbour	25 May 2025	N/A
Psychologists Cindy Hall and Jamin Halberstadt undergo their own stress tests building a Mountain Modern home overlooking Otago Harbour.
72	6	"Tennis Court"	Paraparaumu	1 June 2025	N/A
An old tennis court in Paraparaumu is set to become Bridget and Graeme Clarke's new family home but the project lobs up a series of backhanders.
73	7	"Loburn Lifestyle"	Loburn	8 June 2025	N/A
Garry and Fiona Learmonth, a couple with peaceful retirement in mind, plan a rustic retreat in North Canterbury inspired by a Stealth Fighter Bomber.
74	8	"Whanganui Mid-Century"	Whanganui	15 June 2025	N/A
Dave Poppe, a rambunctious retired bricklayer builds one final house, for himself and Jan, his ever-patient wife, on their farm near Whanganui.

=== Series 10 (2026) ===
No. overall	No. in season	Title	Location	Original release date	Viewers
75	1	"Earnscleugh"	Central Otago	12 April 2026	N/A
A well-resourced couple who fall in love with a rundown Central Otago "castle", find restoring a heritage building is anything but romantic.
76	2	"Tauranga Hilltop"	Bay of Plenty	19 April 2026	N/A
In western Bay of Plenty, a Modernist-inspired house with its own art gallery is the brainchild of a cement industry veteran who came to architecture later in life.
77	3	"Huntsbury Strawbale"	Huntsbury	26 April 2026	N/A
An environmentally-committed young couple in Christchurch buck convention by going back to the future with a centuries-old building material.
78	4	"Bendigo"	Bendigo	3 May 2026	N/A
A Central Otago vineyard is the breath-taking site for a multigenerational home bringing an extended family back together with the matriarch's own journey front of mind.
79	5	"Kawau"	Kawau	10 May 2026	N/A
A Hauraki Gulf Island with and illustrious history looks to be an idyllic family retreat but building there proves to be a logistical nightmare.
80	6	"Matinborough"	Martinborough	17 May 2026	N/A
A 'forever' home amongst the vines in Martinborough wine country, with a black and white combination of Yakisugi wood and Oamaru stone, tests the limits of an enterprising couple's resources.
81	7	"Ōmaha"	Ōmaha	24 May 2026	N/A
In a prominent position in one of New Zealand's most well-known beach-side communities, an Auckland couple plan a holiday home work of art.
82	8	"Rock House"	Queenstown	31 May 2026	N/A
A seemingly impossible to build on section high above Queenstown is the location for Hans and Suzy Raetz's 'fun' project - a modular home constructed in Cromwell.
