= Escape to the Wild =

2015 British television series

- Genre: Documentary
- Developed by: Optomen Productions
- Presented by: Kevin McCloud
- Country of origin: United Kingdom
- Original language: English
- No. of series: 2
- No. of episodes: 7

Production
- Running time: 46-47 minutes

Original release
- Network: Channel 4
- Release: 8 June 2015 – 16 February 2017

Escape to the Wild is a British television series produced by Optomen television and broadcast on Channel 4. It was originally titled, Kevin McCloud's Escape to the Wild, with Kevin McCloud as the presenter who follows British families who have given up their urban lives in the UK for a new one in remote destinations around the world. With McCloud's departure, the name has been shortened to Escape to the Wild.

== Kevin McCloud's Escape to the Wild - Episodes ==
No.	Title	Date
1	"Tonga"	8 June 2015
2	"Chile"	15 June 2015
3	"Belize"	22 June 2015
4	"Sweden"	29 June 2015

== Escape to the Wild - Episodes ==
No.	Title	Date
1	"Indonesia"	2 February 2017
2	"Yukon"	9 February 2017
3	"Uganda"	16 February 2017
