= Kevin McCloud =

British designer (born 1959)

Kevin McCloud MBE
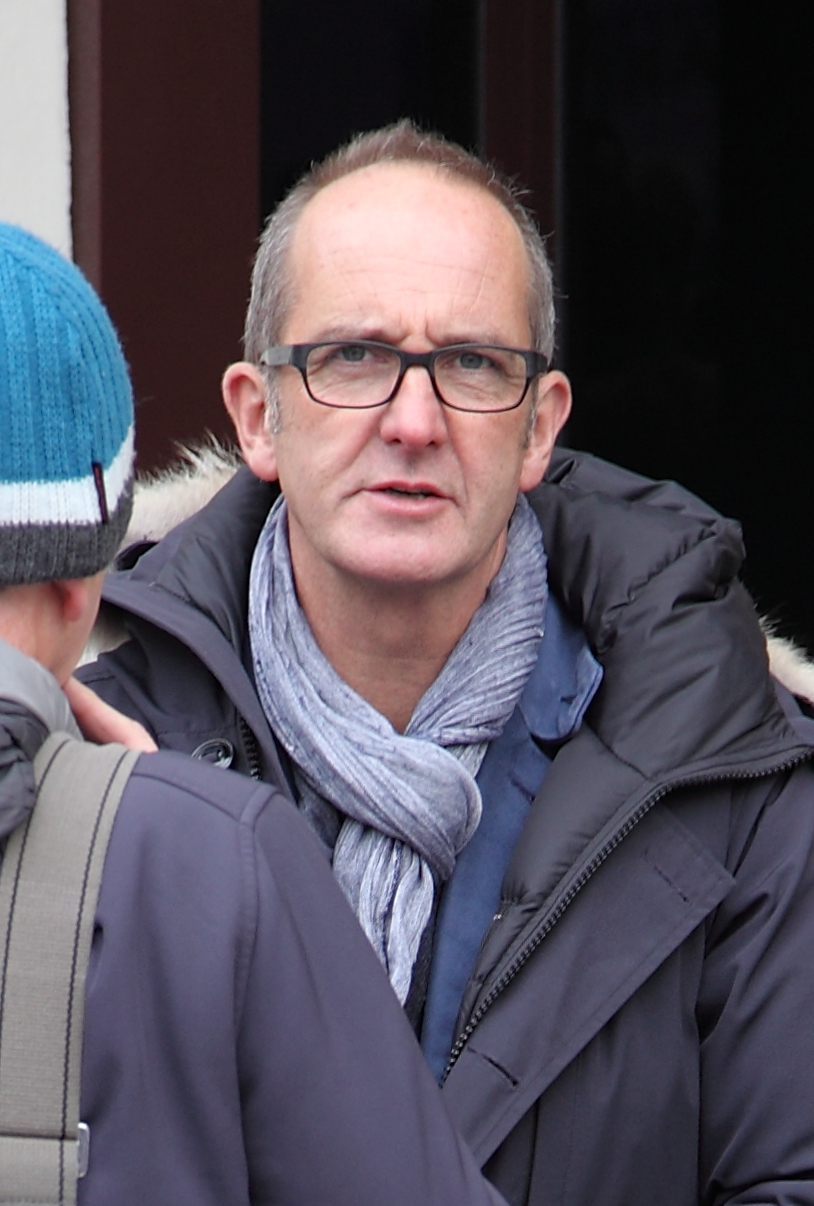
- McCloud pictured at Piccadilly Circus in 2014
- Born: 8 May 1959 (age 67); Bedfordshire, England
- Education: Corpus Christi College, Cambridge
- Occupations: Author, broadcaster, TV presenter, designer
- Known for: Grand Designs (1999–present)
- Political party: Green Party of England and Wales (2015–present)
- Spouse: Suzanna McCloud (m. 1996; sep. 2019) Jenny Jones (m. 2022)
- Children: 4

Kevin McCloud MBE (born 8 May 1959) is a British designer, writer, and a television presenter. He has presented the Channel 4 series Grand Designs since its debut in April 1999.

== Early life ==
Born in Bedfordshire, McCloud and his two brothers, Terence and Graham, were raised in Toddington in a house his parents had built. McCloud attended Dunstable Grammar School, which became Manshead comprehensive, and after his A levels, went to work on a farm in Tuscany and studied singing at the Conservatory of Music in Florence for a year. Although he was offered a three-year course in Italy, he was persuaded to return to take up a place at Corpus Christi College, Cambridge, where he studied languages before changing to philosophy and finally settling on the history of art and architecture. He was a member of the Footlights comedy ensemble at Cambridge alongside Stephen Fry, Hugh Laurie, and Emma Thompson, working as a costume and set designer for the troupe.

== Designer ==
After graduating, McCloud trained as a theatre designer, working on a wide variety of different productions, such as the set design for experimental rock group Harvey and the Wallbangers, before setting up his own lighting design practice and manufacturing business 'McCloud Lighting' – at one point employing 26 people. His work includes the carved and painted rococo-style vegetable ceiling in the food halls at Harrods, many projects in conjunction with J.J. Desmond Interiors and lighting fittings at Ely Cathedral, Edinburgh Castle, the Savoy Hotel and the Dorchester Hotel. Today he concentrates on television work, journalism and product design, including work for British manufacturers.

== Career ==
=== Books ===
McCloud's first book, Kevin McCloud's Decorating Book, was published in 1990. The Techniques of Decorating and Kevin McCloud's Lighting Book were published in 1995, The Complete Decorator in 1996, Choosing Colours in 2003, Grand Designs Handbook: The Blueprint in 2006, and 43 Principles of Home: Enjoying Life in the 21st Century in 2010.

=== Television ===
McCloud's first appearance on television was as a guest presenter on Homefront on BBC Two. In 1999, he then went on to write and present Grand Designs, a programme covering unusual and elaborate architectural homebuilding projects, produced by Talkback Thames, which recently completed its twenty-fourth series.

He also wrote and presented Grand Designs Indoors and Grand Designs Abroad. In the course of the later series, McCloud demonstrated his fluency in French and Italian, occasionally acting as a translator for people who had houses built abroad in places where they didn't know the language. He is also editor-at-large for Grand Designs magazine, and sat on the steering committee for the associated exhibition "Grand Designs Live" in 2005 and 2006.

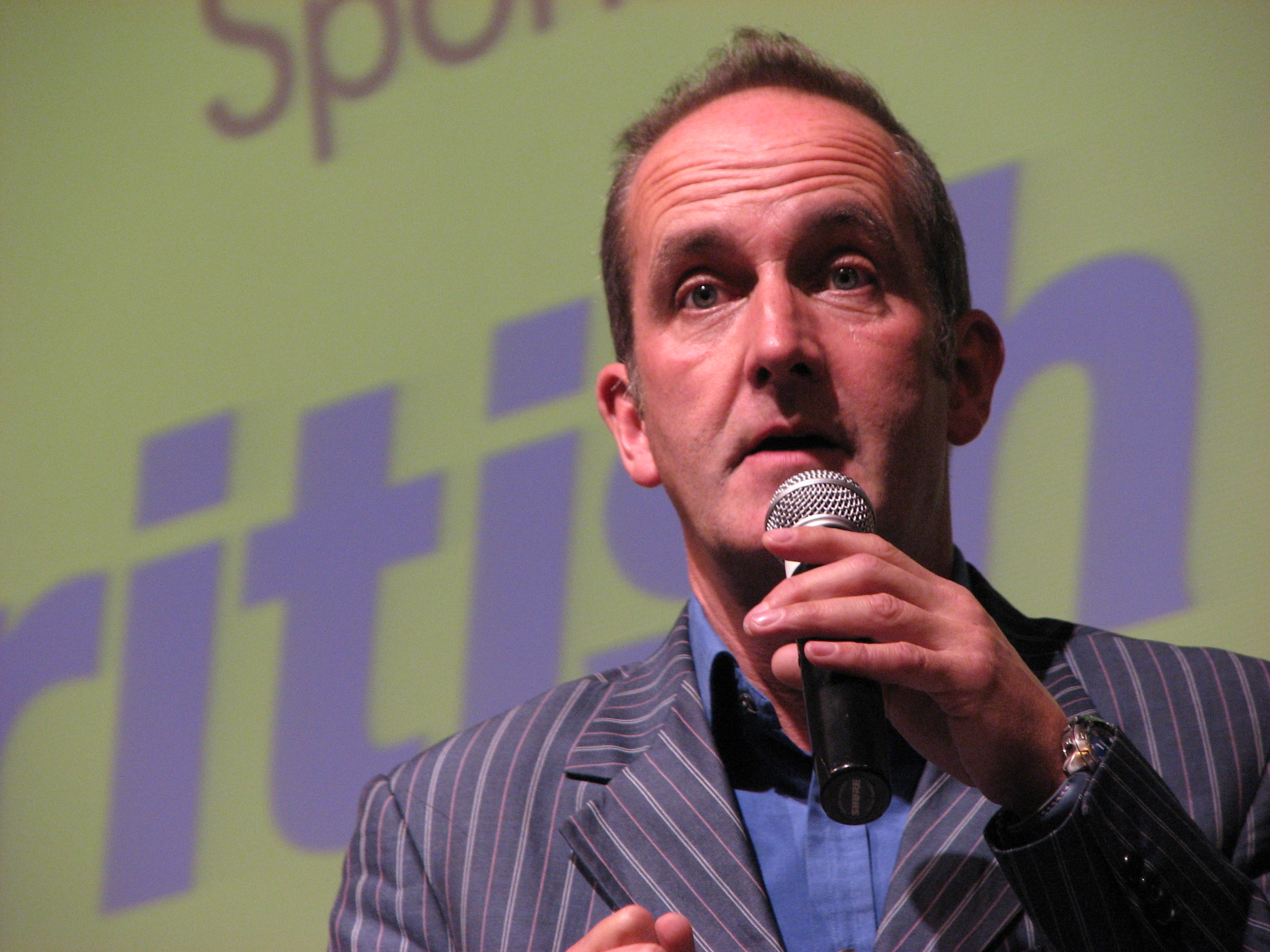
McCloud speaking at the 2009 Grand Designs LIVE in Birmingham

In May 2008, McCloud took the Grand Designs series of programmes to a new level with Grand Designs Live, in which he demonstrated environmentally sensitive construction methods on a site in the East End of London, as well as presenting a "Grand Design of the Year" competition. His co-presenters included Dave Gorman, Janet Street-Porter, Naomi Cleaver, Diarmuid Gavin and Bill Bailey.

Other TV work has included Don't Look Down, in which McCloud examined the construction of tall buildings while climbing them, on BBC Two in 2000, Demolition on Channel 4 in 2005, The Stirling Prize: Building of the Year (in 2004, 2005, 2006, 2007 and 2008), and Kevin McCloud and the Big Town Plan on Channel 4 in August 2008.

On 30 November 2008, he appeared as the Star in a Reasonably Priced Car on Top Gear. He finished with a time of 1:45.87, second on the leaderboard behind Jay Kay, who finished with 1:45.83.

McCloud presented Kevin McCloud's Grand Tour on Channel 4 during the late summer and early autumn of 2009. The four-part series saw McCloud retracing the popular tour of European cities and sites of classical antiquity undertaken over the last four centuries by upper-class, primarily British, young men of means, and describing their subsequent impact on British customs and architecture.

In January 2010, McCloud fronted a two-part documentary, Kevin McCloud: Slumming It, detailing a two-week stay in Mumbai's Dharavi slum. In 2011, McCloud appeared on an episode of Carpool.

In September 2012, McCloud presented Kevin McCloud's Man Made Home on Channel 4, a four-part series where he constructed a cabin in the woods, with an emphasis on sustainable, locally sourced and environmentally responsible materials and techniques. In 2013, the cabin was moved to the seaside near Watchet on the Somerset coast to film a second four-part series of the show with a more "beach shack" theme. In August 2013, McCloud took part in the Blue Anchor to Minehead RNLI Raft Race, as part of the filming of the series. His raft got 20 yards off shore before being towed the rest of the way.

In June 2015, McCloud fronted Escape to the Wild. He went to four different British families around the world who have left Britain behind to a life in far-flung remote destinations: one on a desert island in the south Pacific nation of Tonga, one near a volcano in Chile, one in the middle of a jungle in Belize and the final in Jämtland in Sweden.

McCloud's television series Kevin McCloud's Rough Guide to the Future, released in 2020, is a three-part series on Channel 4 featuring Alice Levine, Jon Richardson and Phil Wang. The three comedians are sent around the world to take a light-hearted look at some of the planet's biggest issues and the technology that could offer solutions.

In 2020, McCloud narrated Celebrity Snoop Dogs, which gave viewers a chance to see inside celebrities' homes via a camera attached to the celebrities' dogs.

In 2026 he presented Kevin McCloud's Listed Britain for More4, a series featuring Grade I listed buildings around the United Kingdom.

=== Podcast ===
In 2025, McCloud launched the podcast "Tim & Kev's Big Design Adventure," with Tim Ross, an Australian television presenter with an interest in design and architecture. The podcast was in the works for over two years, with each episode discussing different architectural buildings they had visited and general conversation.

== Developer ==
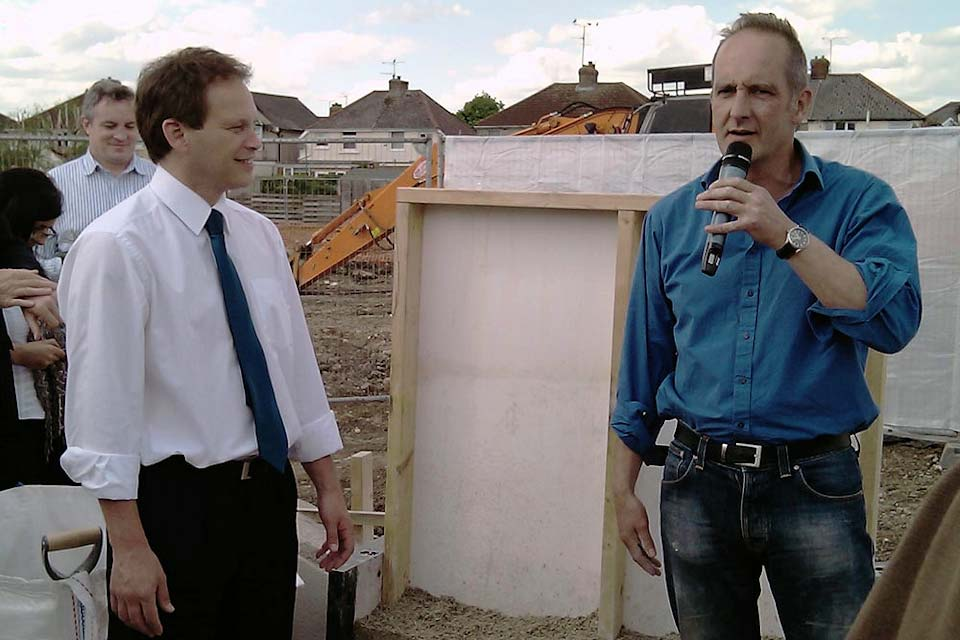
Kevin McCloud with then Minister for Housing Grant Shapps on the site of his development, The Triangle, in Swindon in 2010

In early 2007 McCloud created HAB Housing Limited, ("Happiness, Architecture, Beauty"). McCloud led a consortium to purchase two plots of land to build a HAB housing development on the outskirts of Swindon, Wiltshire.

In October 2009, it was announced that HAB Oakus, a joint venture between HAB and housing group GreenSquare, had won planning permission for its first housing scheme in Swindon. The 42-home scheme, called The Triangle, would occupy the site of a former caravan park. Housing would be "environmentally sustainable, affordable". The Homes And Communities Agency, a UK national housing and regeneration agency, had already announced in April 2010 that it would back the plans by contributing £2.5m. Construction of the development was completed late in 2011. The process was filmed and broadcast as part of a Grand Designs special two-part episode called Kevin's Grand Design. A website was set up about the project.

In September 2013, HAB broke the world record for equity crowdfunding by securing investments in excess of £1.9 million from members of the public via online platform Crowdcube, beating the previous record of £1.5 million with pledges of £1,904,540.

In August 2019 it was reported that no money had been paid back to HAB investors who faced potentially losing 97% of their investment in a worst-case scenario. Problems with other schemes he promoted were also reported. McCloud said he went through "a great deal of heartache and pain" to try to keep the HAB company viable and told The Guardian: "I will of course do everything in my power to improve the current situation."

== Awards ==
In 2005, McCloud was awarded the honorary degree of Doctor of Design from both Oxford Brookes and Plymouth University. He was awarded an Honorary Fellowship of the Royal Institute of British Architects in 2006 and of the Society of Light & Lighting (SLL) in 2009. McCloud was appointed a Member of the Order of the British Empire (MBE) in the 2014 New Year Honours for services to sustainable design and energy-saving property refurbishment.

== Personal life ==
McCloud formerly lived in Frome in Somerset, with his then wife Suzanna McCloud. They have two children together. McCloud also has two children from previous relationships. He separated from Suzanna McCloud in December 2019 after 23 years together. In 2022, he married businesswoman Jenny Jones; they live in Herefordshire.

== Politics ==
McCloud joined the Green Party of England and Wales in 2015, and endorsed the parliamentary candidacy of the party's Caroline Lucas in that year's general election. In October 2023, on Times Radio, he reasserted his endorsement of the party and actively campaigned on behalf of Ellie Chowns in his home county of Herefordshire.
