= Thomas J. Webster =

American engineering researcher

- Education: University of Pittsburgh; Rensselaer Polytechnic Institute
- Scientific career
- Fields: Biomedical engineering Chemical engineering Nanomedicine
- Institutions: Northeastern University, Purdue University, Brown University, Hebei Institute of Technology, Saveetha University, Federal University of Piaui
- Thesis: Design, synthesis, and evaluation of nanophase ceramics for orthopaedic/dental applications (2000)
- Doctoral advisors: Rena Bizios; Richard W. Siegel

Thomas J. Webster is an American biomedical engineer, researcher, and entrepreneur.

== Education ==
Webster holds a BSc degree in chemical engineering from the University of Pittsburgh (1995), and an MSc and PhD (2000) in biomedical engineering from Rensselaer Polytechnic Institute (Troy, NY). Rensselaer Polytechnic Institute is the oldest engineering school in the U.S.

== Research ==
Webster's research has examined the multiple uses of nanotechnology. His studies focus on the development, production, and assessment of nanophase materials as superior biomedical materials. He has researched on the application of nanophase materials for tissue regeneration. His research has focussed on hydroxyapatite, the major inorganic component to bone. In contrast to hydroxyapatite that had not been doped, Webster's research on osteoblast (bone-forming cells) response to hydroxyapatite doped with divalent and trivalent cations showed that osteoblast adherence and differentiation on the doped HA were increased. In other research, he creates surfaces with nanostructures that have been FDA-approved for implantation in tissues like bone, the spine, and dental applications.

His research has included nanoparticles that may enter biofilms, lessen inflammation, and specifically target cancer cells. Dr. Webster was the first to identify improved tissue growth on nanomaterials. He was the first to identify decreased bacteria functions on nanomaterials. Dr. Webster was the first to establish a mathematical equation that can be used to predict nanoscale surface features to improve tissue growth, reduce infection, and limit infection. He trademarked this process as "Nano-Optimized", 2008.

== Career ==
Webster is presently the chief nano scientific officer at PrinterPrezz in Fremont, California, and serves as the chief scientific officer of his numerous start-up companies. He started his career as an assistant professor at the Purdue University. His research on nanomedicine has received attention in media including MSNBC, NBC Nightly News, PBS DragonFly TV, ABC Nightly News via the Ivanhoe Medical Breakthrough Segment, Fox News, the Weather Channel, NBC Today Show, National Geographic's TV series on the future of medicine, ABC Boston, Discovery Channel, and OpenAccess Government. His work has been on display at the London and Boston Science Museums.

== Awards and honors ==
Webster has been honored with many awards including:

- BMES Rita Schaffer Young Investigator Award (2002),
- Coulter Foundation Early Career Award (2005)
- Acta Biomaterialia Silver Award (2017)
- Clarivate's Most Distinguished Researcher recognition (Top 0.1% Citations in Pharmacology and Toxicology).

Webster has received numerous honors including:

- 2002, Biomedical Engineering Society Rita Schaffer Young Investigator Award
- 2003, Outstanding Young Investigator Award Purdue University College of Engineering
- 2005, American Association of Nanomedicine Young Investigator Award
- 2005, Coulter Foundation Young Investigator Award
- 2006, Fellow, American Association of Nanomedicine
- 2010, Distinguished Lecturer in Nanomedicine, University of South Florida
- 2011, Outstanding Leadership Award for the Biomedical Engineering Society
- 2012, Fellow, American Institute for Medical and Biological Engineering representing the top 2% of all medical and biological engineers)
- 2013, Fellow, Biomedical Engineering Society
- 2014, Fellow, Ernst Strugmann
- 2016, Fellow, College of Fellows of the International Union of Biomaterials Sciences and Engineering
- 2016, SCOPUS Highly Cited Research (Top 1% Materials Science);
- 2017, Fellow, National Associate of Inventor
- 2017, Acta Biomaterialia Silver Award (given to researchers under the age of 45)
- 2019, Overseas Fellow, Royal Society for Medicine
- 2000, SCOPUS Top 1% citations for materials science research and mixed fields
- 2021, PLOS Top 2% All World Scientist Citations
- 2022, Clarivate Most Distinguished Researcher Top 0.1% Citations in Pharmacology and Toxicology
- 2022, Fellow, International Association for Advanced Materials
- 2023, Research.com Best Materials Science Scientist by Citations

== Editorships ==
Webster is serving as the Editor-in-chief of the Research Journal of Medical and Health Sciences and was the founding editor-in-chief of the International Journal of Nanomedicine pioneering the open-access format.

== Patents ==
Webster has obtained many patents for his inventions and his patents including:

- Nanotubes as carriers of nucleic acids into cells (US10344300B2)
- System and method for attaching soft tissue to an implant (US8945601B2)
- Nanofibers as a neural biomaterial (US7993412B2)
- Nanotubes and compositions thereof (US10201634B2)
- Implantable cellular and biotherapeutic agent delivery canister (US10751280B2)
- Method for producing nanostructures on a surface of a medical implant (US20110125263A1)
- Nanostructured surfaces (US11560014B2),
- Tellurium Nanostructures with antimicrobial and anticancer properties synthesized by aloe vera–Mediated green chemistry (US20220071919A1)
- Metallic nanoparticles as orthopedic biomaterial (EP1613248B1)
- Antipathogenic surfaces having selenium nanoclusters (WO2012009433A1)

These patents have formed many companies who have commercial products including Audax, NanoVis, NanoVis Spine, Perios, Dental Regen, Quarksen, SynCell, Novaraum, AKiCept, Zeda, MetaFree, and Interstellar Therapeutics.

== Publications ==
Webster and his team have published over 1350 peer-reviewed publications. His H-index places him in the top 1% of cited articles by researchers in materials science.

An example of these articles appear below:

- Thomas J Webster, Celaletdin Ergun, Robert H Doremus, Richard W Siegel, Rena Bizios; Enhanced functions of osteoblasts on nanophase ceramics. Biomaterials.
- Thomas J Webster, Celaletdin Ergun, Robert H Doremus, Richard W Siegel, Rena Bizios. Specific proteins mediate enhanced osteoblast adhesion on nanophase ceramics. Journal of Biomedical Materials Research.
- Thomas J Webster, Jeremiah U Ejiofor. Increased osteoblast adhesion on nanophase metals: Ti, Ti6Al4V, and CoCrMo. Biomaterials.
- Thomas J Webster, Celaletdin Ergun, Robert H Doremus, Richard W Siegel, Rena Bizios. Enhanced osteoclast-like cell functions on nanophase ceramics. Biomaterials.
- Thomas J Webster, Linda S Schadler, Richard W Siegel, Rena Bizios. Mechanisms of enhanced osteoblast adhesion on nanophase alumina involve vitronectin. Tissue engineering.

== Controversies ==
=== Retractions ===
As of September 1, 2024, at least seven articles co-authored by Webster have been retracted.

- Stout, David A.; Basu, Bikramjit; Webster, Thomas J. (2011-08-01). "RETRACTED: Poly(lactic–co-glycolic acid): Carbon nanofiber composites for myocardial tissue engineering applications". Acta Biomaterialia. 7 (8): 3101–3112. doi:10.1016/j.actbio.2011.04.028. ISSN 1742-7061. PMID 21571106. (Retracted, see doi:10.1016/j.actbio.2023.03.009, PMID 37003623, Retraction Watch) - "[P]arts of Figures 3, 9 and 10 are falsified and/or fabricated."
- Gupta, Ankush; Singh, Sima; Kotla, Niranjan G.; Webster, Thomas J. (2014-12-24). "Formulation and evaluation of a topical niosomal gel containing a combination of benzoyl peroxide and tretinoin for antiacne activity". International Journal of Nanomedicine. 10 (1): 171–182. doi:10.2147/IJN.S70449. PMC 4283991. PMID 25565812. (Retracted, see doi:10.2147/IJN.S320896, PMID 34168452) - "[S]everal images shown in Figure 16 of the article appeared to be duplicated."
- Liu, Wenwen; Su, Penglei; Iii, Arthur Gonzales; Chen, Su; Wang, Na; Wang, Jinshu; Li, Hongyi; Zhang, Zhenting; Webster, Thomas J. (2015-03-12). "Optimizing stem cell functions and antibacterial properties of TiO2 nanotubes incorporated with ZnO nanoparticles: experiments and modeling". International Journal of Nanomedicine. 10 (1): 1997–2019. doi:10.2147/IJN.S74418. PMC 4364596. PMID 25792833. (Retracted, see doi:10.2147/IJN.S359722, PMID 35115778) - "[D]uplication of figures and results with those from an earlier publication."
- Liu, Wenwen; Su, Penglei; Chen, Su; Wang, Na; Wang, Jinshu; Liu, Yiran; Ma, Yuanping; Li, Hongyi; Zhang, Zhenting; Webster, Thomas J (2015-03-01). "Antibacterial and Osteogenic Stem Cell Differentiation Properties of Photoinduced TiO 2 Nanoparticle-Decorated TiO 2 Nanotubes". Nanomedicine. 10 (5): 713–723. doi:10.2217/nnm.14.183. ISSN 1743-5889. PMID 25816875. (Retracted, see doi:10.2217/nnm.14.183r1, PMID 34142558) - "[P]arts of [Figure 6] contained manipulated images. The authors have reconsidered the completeness of the paper and have decided to retract it."
- Dai, Mingzhi; Wu, Zhendong; Qi, Shaocheng; Huo, Changhe; Zhang, Qiang; Zhang, Xingye; Webster, Thomas J.; Zhang, Hengbo (2020-03-17). "Implementation of PPI with Nano Amorphous Oxide Semiconductor Devices for Medical Applications". International Journal of Nanomedicine. 15: 1863–1870. doi:10.2147/IJN.S207852. PMC 7085341. PMID 32231432. (Retracted, see doi:10.2147/IJN.S354565, PMID 34992366) - "Concerns were raised by the Editor following the authors request to make several corrections to the published article. Many of the requested corrections related to data descriptions in the Materials and Methods and the Results and Discussion. Readers should note the Editor confirms the retraction is not due to academic misconduct but owing to the number of corrections reported within the article which were too numerous to be corrected in a standard corrigendum."
- Xu, B.; Zhang, Y.; Yang, H.; Liu, T.; Lu, Y.; Xu, Y.; Zhang, Q.; Li, X.; Huang, Z.; Zhang, Y.; Webster, T. J. (2020-06-01). "Retracted: siVEGF-Loaded Nanoparticle Uptake by Tumor-Associated Vascular Endothelial Cells for Hepatocellular Carcinoma". Nanomedicine. 15 (13): 1297–1314. doi:10.2217/nnm-2020-0082. ISSN 1743-5889. PMID 32458768. (Retracted, see doi:10.2217/nnm-2020-0082r1, PMID 35156419) - "Given the impact these duplicated images [Figures 4A, 4C, 4E] may have on the conclusions of the paper the authors and editors have decided to retract it from publication."
- Nahhas, Alaa F.; Nahhas, Alrayan F.; Webster, Thomas J. (2022-11-30). "Developing and Testing Methylated Nano-Structured Dipeptides that Inhibit Src Kinase Activity In Vitro for Anti-Cancer Applications". JoVE (Journal of Visualized Experiments) (189) e64256. doi:10.3791/64256. ISSN 1940-087X. PMID 36533825. (Retracted, see doi:10.3791/6586, PMID 38096042) - Retracted by the journal due to authorship and reproducibility concerns.

=== Departure from Northeastern ===
Webster resigned from his position at Northeastern in 2021, reportedly "after dozens of his studies came under scrutiny online." Webster later stated, "An external investigation panel appointed by Northeastern University consisting of world renowned researchers came to the conclusion in their final report that I had not fabricated or falsified data, and subsequently cleared me of any academic wrongdoing."
