= Kevin McCloud's Man Made Home =

- Created by: Saski Amada
- Presented by: Kevin McCloud
- No. of series: 2

Production
- Running time: 46-49 minutes

Original release
- Network: Channel 4
- Release: 23 September 2012 – 13 October 2013

Kevin McCloud's Man Made Home is a British television series, broadcast on Channel 4. The series features Kevin McCloud's attempt at building a sustainable eco-friendly shed in the woods. In order to achieve this, he decided to use only the materials locally available in the woodland where the shed was to be built, or to employ only recycled materials. Series 1 aired on 23 September 2012 and finished four weeks later on 13 October 2012.

The shed that was successfully produced during the first series, was transportable to avoid the need for planning permissions. Thus in the second series, McCloud decided to relocate the shed to Watchet, on the coast of Somerset where he expanded it, employing a nautical theme to match its location overlooking the sea. The second series aired approximately one year after the first, on 22 September 2013. It finished on 13 October 2013.

A third series of the show has been rumoured, but unconfirmed.

== Reception ==
In 2013, The Sydney Morning Herald awarded the show its annual Couch Potato Award in the Overseas Documentary Series category, stating, "Appealing to our Walden-esque fantasies of creating our own little slice of paradise, it was escapist TV at its best."

== Episode list ==
=== Series 1 (2012) ===
Ep no.	Original air date	Description	Viewers (millions)
1	23 September 2012	In the first episode, Kevin McCloud fells two large oak trees, which he splits using explosives. The wood is then used to produce the walls and roof of his new shed. Meanwhile, to create light, McCloud employs waste fat collected from the sewers under London.	1.97
2	30 September 2012	McCloud moves his attention to the windows, floor and glue (for the doorframe). The glass is made on site after melting down waste bottles, whilst urine and rabbit skins are used to produce the glue. A fireplace is built using a recycled safe, although issues arise when the paint is discovered to be toxic.	1.71
3	7 October 2012	To provide biogas for cooking, McCloud sets up a small biogas plant, using human waste and lion faeces as the main ingredients. McCloud's team also builds a reclining chair out of recycled tractor parts, metal scavenged from a canal, and buckskin which he tans. He also builds a bed from wood and woven willow.	1.65
4	14 October 2012	After finishing off the shed in the episode, McCloud creates a "hot spa" using parts from a jet engine, he also converts an existing wall into a drop-down veranda, and uses alpaca fibre to weave a bathrobe.	1.73

=== Series 2 (2013) ===
Ep no.	Original air date	Description	Viewers (millions)
1	22 September 2013	After successfully relocating the shed to Somerset, fish oil is produced to provide fuel for the lamps and the team scavenge wood from a derelict boat to build their new "deck". An attempt to reach a local pub in a raft made from inflated sheep bladders meets with some success, although they need help to complete the journey. The episode closes with a meal made from seaweed, limpets and food found along the coast.	1.48
2	29 September 2013	McCloud builds a glass conservatory using old windscreens and aeroplane windows. He makes a lobster trap from recycled shopping trolleys found in a canal, a hammock and some soap from fish oil.	1.17
3	6 October 2013	A scissor lift is re-purposed as a retractable observation tower with the batteries charged by gas created from manure. the roof of the observation tower is made from recycled copper boilers and melted down copper discarded from a nuclear power station. A barbecue is then created from a World War II Soviet marine mine. McCloud also makes some toothpaste from cuttlefish and urine.	1.46
4	13 October 2013	With the major work completed, the focus moves to "creature comforts". The team create a floating bar from some old crates, a raincoat made from pig intestines and a hot shower from a recycled telephone box found at a nearby scrapyard.	1.48
