= List of Grand Designs episodes =

This is a list of episodes from the television series Grand Designs. The list also includes Indoors, Abroad, Revisited, House of the Year and The Streets.

== Series overview ==
Series	Episodes	Originally released	
Series	Episodes	First released	Last released
1	8	29 April 1999	24 June 1999
2	8	17 July 2001	4 September 2001
3	8	12 February 2003	1 October 2003
4	7	21 January 2004	10 March 2004
5	20	6 April 2005	16 May 2007
6	7	16 January 2008	2 April 2008
7	8	28 January 2009	8 April 2009
8	8	15 September 2010	3 November 2010
9	7	14 September 2011	26 October 2011
10	8	12 September 2012	7 November 2012
11	9	4 September 2013	30 October 2013
12	7	3 September 2014	15 October 2014
13	7	9 September 2015	21 October 2015
14	8	21 September 2016	17 November 2016
15	8	6 September 2017	25 October 2017
16	6	19 September 2018	24 October 2018
17	6	4 September 2019	9 October 2019
18	5	6 January 2021	3 February 2021
19	7	1 September 2021	13 October 2021
20	7	31 August 2022	12 October 2022
21	5	27 September 2023	8 November 2023
22	5	25 September 2024	23 October 2024
23	8	26 March 2025	29 October 2025
24	4	16 September 2026	7 October 2026

== Episodes ==
=== Series 1 (1999) ===
No.	Title	Location	Original release date	UK viewers (millions)
1	"The Timber Frame Kit House"	Newhaven, East Sussex	29 April 1999	N/A
2	"The English Barn"	Oxfordshire	6 May 1999	N/A
3	"The Co-Op"	Brighton	13 May 1999	N/A
4	"The Water Tower"	Coleshill, Amersham	20 May 1999	N/A
5	"The Eco-House"	Suffolk	3 June 1999	N/A
6	"The Chapel"	Cornwall	10 June 1999	2.35
7	"The House of Straw"	Islington, North London	17 June 1999	N/A
8	"The Glass-House"	Town Fields, Doncaster	24 June 1999	1.81

=== Series 2 (2001) ===
No.	Title	Location	Original release date	UK viewers (millions)
1	"The Regency Villa"	Farnham, Surrey	17 July 2001	2.34
2	"The New England Gable House"	Sussex	24 July 2001	2.25
3	"The Wool Mill"	Netherton, Yorkshire	31 July 2001	2.61
4	"The Isolated Cottage"	Brecon Beacons, Wales	7 August 2001	3.14
5	"The Cruciform House"	Lambourn Valley, Berkshire	14 August 2001	3.37
6	"The Self-Build"	Birmingham	21 August 2001	2.81
7	"The Jewel Box"	London	28 August 2001	2.64
8	"The Derelict Barns"	Devon	4 September 2001	3.45

=== Series 3 (2003) ===
No.	Title	Location	Original release date	UK viewers (millions)
1	"The Wooden Box"	Peterborough	12 February 2003	4.28
2	"The Water-Works"	Whaley, Derbyshire	19 February 2003	4.53
3	"The Woodsmans Cottage"	Sussex	26 February 2003	4.20
4	"The Victorian Threshing Barn"	Surrey	5 March 2003	4.16
5	"The Inverted-Roof House"	Buckinghamshire	12 March 2003	4.62
6	"The Terrace Conversion"	Hackney, London	17 September 2003	3.52
7	"The Underground House"	Cumbria	24 September 2003	4.09
8	"The Traditional Cottage"	Herefordshire	1 October 2003	4.12

=== Series 4 (2004) ===
No.	Title	Location	Original release date	UK viewers (millions)
1	"The Violin Factory"	Lambeth, London	21 January 2004	4.83
2	"Customised German Kit House"	Walton on Thames, Surrey	28 January 2004	5.04
3	"19th Century Sandstone House"	Leith, Edinburgh	11 February 2004	5.19
4	"The Curved House"	Clapham South, London	18 February 2004	4.79
5	"The Modernist Sugar Cube"	Pett Level, Sussex	25 February 2004	5.22
6	"The Oak-Framed House"	Kilcreggan, Argyll, Scotland	3 March 2004	5.88
7	"An Idiosyncratic Home"	Avon Tyrrell, Dorset	10 March 2004	5.50

=== Series 5 (2005–07) ===
No.	Title	Location	Original release date	UK viewers (millions)
1	"The Sliding Glass Roof House" aka "Urban Space Pod"	Cossall Park, Peckham, London	13 April 2005	4.51
2	"The 16th Century Farmhouse"	Gloucester	20 April 2005	4.71
3	"Finnish Log Cabin"	Kent	27 April 2005	4.94
4	"Shaped Like a Curvy Seashell"	Shaldon, Devon	19 October 2005	5.05
5	"A 21st Century Answer to the Roman Villa"	Belfast, Northern Ireland	2 November 2005	3.96
6	"The Miami-Style Beach House"	Devon	9 November 2005	4.11
7	"The Eco-House"	Carmarthen, Wales	16 November 2005	4.15
8	"The Loch House"	Killearn, Scotland	5 April 2006	3.93
9	"The Contemporary Barn Conversion"	Ross-on-Wye	12 April 2006	4.04
10	"The Contemporary Cedar Clad Home"	Stirling, Scotland	19 April 2006	4.35
11	"Water Tower Conversion"	Ashford, Kent	26 April 2006	3.77
12	"Garden House" aka "Mies van der Rohe Inspired House"	Exeter	17 May 2006	3.28
13	"The 14th Century Castle" (90 minutes)	Skipton, North Yorkshire	28 February 2007	5.76
14	"The Thatched Cottage"	Hampshire	7 March 2007	5.01
15	"The Eco-Barge"	Medway	14 March 2007	5.60
16	"The Bournemouth Penthouse"	Bournemouth	21 March 2007	5.48
17	"The Birmingham Church"	Tipton, Birmingham	4 April 2007	3.91
18	"The Art Deco House"	Guildford	11 April 2007	3.81
19	"The Cambridgeshire Eco Home"	Cambridgeshire Fens	2 May 2007	4.03
20	"The Glass & Timber House"	Dulwich, London	16 May 2007	3.76

=== Series 6 (2008) ===
No.	Title	Location	Original release date	UK viewers (millions)
1	"The Underground House"	Cheltenham	16 January 2008	4.72
2	"The Decagon House"	Oxfordshire	23 January 2008	4.42
3	"The Modernist Sugar Cube"	Sneyd Park, Bristol	30 January 2008	5.10
4	"The Gothic House"	Monmouth	6 February 2008	3.93
5	"The Lime Kiln House"	Midlothian, Scotland	13 February 2008	5.45
6	"The Bath Kit House"	Bathwick Hill, Bath, Somerset	20 February 2008	4.54
7	"The Hi Tech Bungalow"	Maidstone, Kent	2 April 2008	3.48

=== Series 7 (2009) ===
No.	Title	Location	Original release date	UK viewers (millions)
1	"The Apprentice Store"	Somerset	28 January 2009	4.58
2	"The Chilterns Water Mill"	Chilterns, Oxfordshire	4 February 2009	4.43
3	"The Newport Folly"	Newport, Wales	11 February 2009	4.09
4	"The Eco Arch"	Weald of Kent	18 February 2009	3.52
A couple have plans for the good life in Kent.
5	"The Brittany Groundhouse"	Brittany, France	25 February 2009	4.66
6	"The Marlborough Farm House"	Marlborough, Wiltshire	4 March 2009	4.55
7	"The Headcorn Minimalist House"	Headcorn, Kent	11 March 2009	4.09
8	"The Brighton Modern Mansion"	Brighton	8 April 2009	2.97

=== Series 8 (2010) ===
No.	Title	Location	Original release date	UK viewers (millions)
1	"The Tree House"	Isle of Wight	15 September 2010	3.78
2	"The Stealth House"	Cotswolds	22 September 2010	3.35
3	"The Modest Home"	Woodbridge	29 September 2010	4.02
4	"The Barn & Guildhall"	Stowmarket	6 October 2010	3.02
5	"The Radian House"	Ipswich	13 October 2010	2.80
6	"The Scandinavian House"	Lizard Peninsula	20 October 2010	3.25
7	"The Adaptahaus"	West Cumbria	27 October 2010	3.04
8	"The Dome House"	Lake District National Park	3 November 2010	3.12

=== Series 9 (2011) ===
No.	Title	Location	Original release date	UK viewers (millions)
1	"The Derelict Mill Cottage"	Newcastle, Northumberland	14 September 2011	3.26
2	"The Contemporary Mansion"	Bromley, London	21 September 2011	3.19
3	"The Lifeboat Station"	Tenby	28 September 2011	3.63
4	"The Large Timber-framed Barn"	Braintree, Essex	5 October 2011	2.99
5	"The Recycled Timber-framed House"	Herefordshire	12 October 2011	3.52
6	"The Dilapidated Engine House"	Cornwall	19 October 2011	3.51
7	"The Disco Home"	Kensington, London	26 October 2011	2.91

=== Series 10 (2012) ===
No.	Title	Location	Original release date	UK viewers (millions)
1	"Cloontykilla Castle"	Roscommon, Ireland	12 September 2012	2.89
2	"The Computer-cut House"	Hertfordshire	19 September 2012	2.76
3	"The Glass Cubes House"	Brixton, London	26 September 2012	2.67
4	"The Thames Boathouse"	River Thames, Oxfordshire	10 October 2012	2.66
5	"The Derelict Water Tower"	Kennington, London	17 October 2012	3.87
6	"The Edwardian Artist's Studio"	West London	24 October 2012	3.23
7	"The Larch-Clad House"	Isle of Skye	31 October 2012	3.00
8	"The Joinery Workshop"	Camden, London	7 November 2012	2.76

=== Series 11 (2013) ===
No.	Title	Location	Original release date	UK viewers (millions)
1	"The 1920s Cinema"	Thorne, South Yorkshire	4 September 2013	2.72
2	"The Miniature Hollywood Mansion"	North London	11 September 2013	2.64
3	"The Giant Farm Shed"	York	18 September 2013	2.73
4	"The Crooked Chocolate Box Cottage"	Tiverton	25 September 2013	2.52
5	"The Metal Sculptural Home"	Strathaven, South Lanarkshire	2 October 2013	2.60
6	"The Japanese House"	Monmouthshire	9 October 2013	2.98
7	"The Modernist Masterpiece"	South London	16 October 2013	3.01
8	"The Cob Castle"	East Devon	23 October 2013	3.10
9	"The Christmas Farm"	Newbury	30 October 2013	2.88

=== Series 12 (2014) ===
No.	Title	Location	Original release date	UK viewers (millions)
1	"The Clifftop House"	North Wales	3 September 2014	2.07
2	"The Cross-Laminated Timber House"	North Cornwall	10 September 2014	2.26
3	"The Round House"	Milton Keynes	17 September 2014	2.00
4	"The Shipping Containers House"	County Londonderry	24 September 2014	2.56
5	"The Urban Shed"	South East London	1 October 2014	2.26
6	"The Periscopes House"	Norwich	8 October 2014	2.35
7	"The Floating House"	Marlow, Buckinghamshire	15 October 2014	2.42

=== Series 13 (2015) ===
No.	Title	Location	Original release date	UK viewers (millions)
1	"The Perfectionist's Bungalow"	West Sussex	9 September 2015	3.06
2	"The Boat House"	East Sussex	16 September 2015	2.51
3	"The Seaside House"	Solent, Isle of Wight	23 September 2015	2.57
4	"The Cave House"	Worcestershire	30 September 2015	2.95
5	"The Blacksmith's House"	County Antrim	7 October 2015	2.99
6	"The Concrete Cow-Shed"	South Somerset	14 October 2015	2.63
7	"The Rusty Metal House"	South Downs	21 October 2015	2.39

=== Series 14 (2016) ===
No.	Title	Location	Original release date	UK viewers (millions)
1	"Gloucestershire Treehouse"	Dursley	21 September 2016	2.51
2	"Fun House"	Horsham	28 September 2016	2.49
3	"Steam Bending House"	South Cornwall	5 October 2016	2.40
4	"Black House"	Essex	12 October 2016	2.26
5	"Ultra-Modern House"	Bolton	19 October 2016	2.30
6	"Low-Impact House"	Pembrokeshire	26 October 2016	2.28
7	"Plough-Shaped House"	Devon	2 November 2016	2.44
8	"Floating Timber House"	The Wirral	17 November 2016	1.81

=== Series 15 (2017) ===
No.	Title	Location	Original release date	UK viewers (millions)
1	"Malvern: Hill House"	Worcestershire	6 September 2017	2.53
2	"Harringey, London: Victorian Gatehouse"	London	13 September 2017	2.16
3	"County Down: Agricultural House"	County Down	20 September 2017	1.88
4	"South Hertfordshire: Roman House"	Hertfordshire	27 September 2017	2.06
5	"South East London: Victorian Dairy House"	London	4 October 2017	2.02
6	"Blackdown Hills, Devon: Snake House"	Devon	11 October 2017	2.13
7	"Peak District: Post-Industrial House"	Youlgrave, Derbyshire	18 October 2017	2.30
8	"London: Minuscule House"	London	25 October 2017	2.07

=== Series 16 (2018) ===
No.	Title	Location	Original release date
1	"Aylesbury Vale (Dinton Castle)"	Buckinghamshire	19 September 2018
2	"Padstow"	Cornwall	26 September 2018
3	"Richmond"	London	3 October 2018
4	"Leominster"	Herefordshire	10 October 2018
5	"Sheffield"	South Yorkshire	17 October 2018
6	"Lewes"	East Sussex	24 October 2018

=== Series 17 (2019) ===
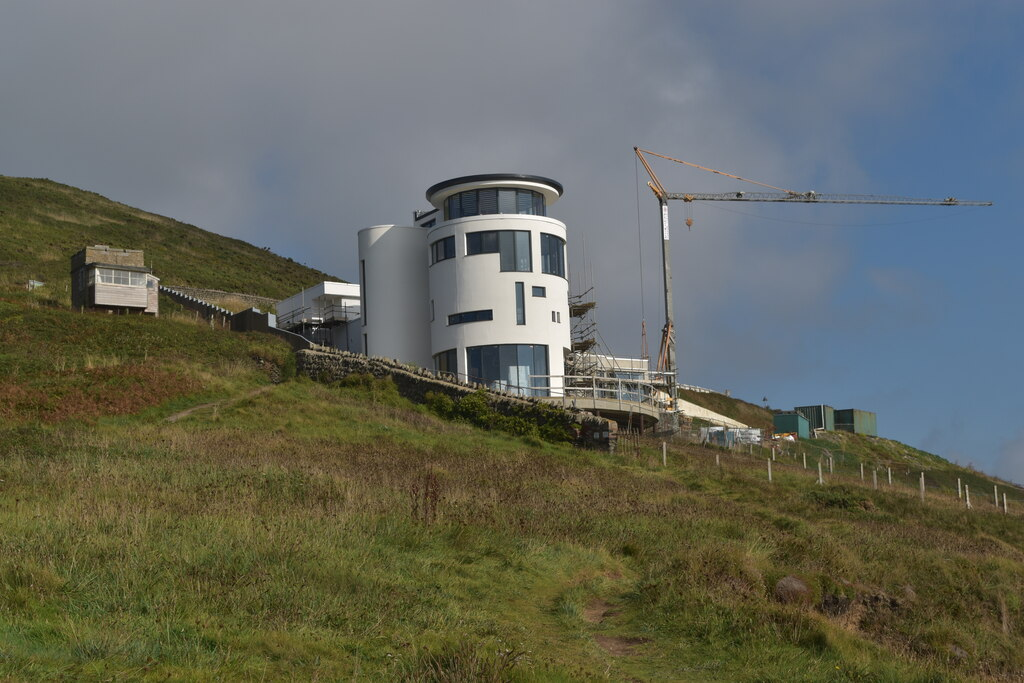
Cheshil Cliff House, Croyde, Devon, Episode 6

No.	Title	Location	Original release date
1	"Galloway"	Dumfries and Galloway	4 September 2019
2	"Lincolnshire"	East Midlands	11 September 2019
3	"Warwickshire"	West Midlands	18 September 2019
4	"Hull"	East Riding of Yorkshire	25 September 2019
5	"West Suffolk"	Suffolk	2 October 2019
6	"North Devon"	Devon	9 October 2019

=== Series 18 (2021) ===
No.	Title	Location	Original release date
1	"South West London"	London	6 January 2021
2	"Sevenoaks"	Kent	13 January 2021
3	"South Lincolnshire"	Lincolnshire	20 January 2021
4	"Bletchley"	Buckinghamshire	27 January 2021
5	"Liskeard"	Cornwall	3 February 2021

=== Series 19 (2021) ===
No.	Title	Location	Original release date
1	"Huxham"	South Devon	1 September 2021
2	"Billingshurst"	West Sussex	8 September 2021
3	"Kinross"	Perth and Kinross	15 September 2021
4	"Ely"	Cambridgeshire	22 September 2021
5	"Chichester"	West Sussex	29 September 2021
6	"South Lakeland"	Cumbria	6 October 2021
7	"East Essex"	Essex	13 October 2021

=== Series 20 (2022) ===
No.	Title	Location	Original release date
1	"South Manchester"	Lancashire	31 August 2022
2	"Tunbridge Wells"	Kent	7 September 2022
3	"Canterbury"	Kent	14 September 2022
4	"Chess Valley"	Hertfordshire	21 September 2022
5	"Derbyshire"	Derbyshire	28 September 2022
6	"Dunstable"	Bedfordshire	5 October 2022
7	"Sydenham Hill, London"	London	12 October 2022

=== Series 21 (2023) ===
No.	Title	Location	Original release date
1	"Wye Valley"	Wye Valley	27 September 2023
2	"Scunthorpe"	Scunthorpe	4 October 2023
3	"Hackney Downs"	Hackney Downs	25 October 2023
4	"South Herefordshire"	South Herefordshire	1 November 2023
5	"North Cotswolds"	North Cotswolds	8 November 2023

=== Series 22 (2024) ===
No.	Title	Location	Original release date
1	"East Yorkshire"	East Yorkshire	25 September 2024
2	"Lincolnshire Wolds"	Lincolnshire	2 October 2024
3	"Keighley"	Keighley	9 October 2024
4	"South Henley"	South Henley	16 October 2024
5	"Northamptonshire"	Northamptonshire	23 October 2024

=== Series 23 (2025) ===
No.	Title	Location	Original release date
1	"East Worthing"	Worthing	26 March 2025
2	"Bedfordshire"	Bedfordshire	2 April 2025
3	"Barnet"	North London	25 April 2025
4	"Durham Dales"	TBA	1 October 2025
5	"Southwater"	Southwater	8 October 2025
6	"South Pembrokeshire"	Pembrokeshire	15 October 2025
7	"Surrey Hills"	Surrey Hills	22 October 2025
8	"Stratford upon Avon"	Stratford upon Avon	29 October 2025

=== Series 24 (2026) ===
No.	Title	Location	Original release date
1	"St Minver Cornwall"	Cornwall	16 September 2026
2	"Kentish Town"	London	23 September 2026
3	"North West London"	London	30 September 2026
4	"East Edinburgh"	Edinburgh	7 October 2026

== Grand Designs Indoors ==
No.	Title	Location	Original release date	UK viewers (millions)
1	"The Former Electricity Sub-Station"	Sunderland	1 March 2001	N/A
2	"The Barbican Flat"	London	8 March 2001	N/A
3	"The Dilapidated Georgian House"	London	15 March 2001	2.38
4	"The Half-Timbered Cottage"	Cheltenham	22 March 2001	N/A
5	"The Shaker Style Summer House and Thames Houseboat"	Devon & London	29 March 2001	N/A
6	"The Regency Home"	Brighton	5 April 2001	N/A

== Grand Designs Abroad ==
No.	Title	Location	Original release date	UK viewers (millions)
1	"Modernist Villa"	Málaga, Spain	8 September 2004	3.24
2	"House from Straw"	Lot, France	15 September 2004	3.13
3	"Masseria Impisi: An Artists' Retreat"	Puglia, Italy	22 September 2004	4.00
4	"19th Century Manor House"	Creuse, France	29 September 2004	3.26
5	"Church Conversion"	Ireland	6 October 2004	3.71
6	"The Tuscan Castle"	Tuscany, Italy	13 October 2004	3.91
7	"300 Year Old Chalet"	Les Gets, France	20 October 2004	3.79
8	"Florida Villa"	Alicante, Spain	27 October 2004	3.93

== Grand Designs Revisited ==
Series	Episodes	Originally released		Average viewers (millions)
Series	Episodes	First released	Last released	Average viewers (millions)
1	5	8 November 2001	6 December 2001	TBA
2	4	10 September 2002	1 October 2002	TBA
3	4	8 October 2003	29 October 2003	TBA
4	1	4 February 2004	4 February 2004	TBA
5	11	6 April 2005	9 July 2007	TBA
6	5	27 February 2008	26 March 2008	TBA
7	5	18 March 2009	29 April 2009	TBA
8	6	10 November 2010	15 December 2010	TBA
9	5	2 November 2011	30 November 2011	TBA
10	4	14 November 2012	5 December 2012	TBA
11	2	6 November 2013	13 November 2013	TBA
12	3	22 October 2014	5 November 2014	TBA
13	4	9 July 2015	30 July 2015	TBA
14	2	28 October 2015	13 November 2015	TBA
15	2	30 May 2017	30 May 2017	TBA
16	1	1 November 2017	1 November 2017	TBA
17	1	31 October 2018	31 October 2018	TBA
18	1	16 October 2019	16 October 2019	TBA
19	1	14 July 2021	14 July 2021	TBA
20	4	19 October 2022	9 November 2022	TBA
21	3	11 October 2023	6 December 2023	TBA
22	1	30 October 2024	30 October 2024	TBA
23	4	16 April 2025	12 November 2025	TBA
24	2	16 October 2026	23 October 2026	TBA

=== Series 1 (2001) ===
No.	Title	Location	Original release date
1	"The Glass-House"	Doncaster	8 November 2001
2	"The Eco-House"	Suffolk	15 November 2001
3	"The House of Straw"	Islington, North London	22 November 2001
4	"The Self-Build"	Birmingham	29 November 2001
5	"The Co-Op"	Brighton	6 December 2001

=== Series 2 (2002) ===
No.	Title	Location	Original release date
1	"The Isolated Cottage"	Brecon Beacons, Wales	10 September 2002
2	"The Dilapidated Georgian House"	London	17 September 2002
3	"The Water Tower"	Coleshill, Amersham	24 September 2002
4	"The Derelict Barns"	Devon	1 October 2002

=== Series 3 (2003) ===
No.	Title	Location	Original release date
1	"The Cruciform House"	Lambourn Valley, Berkshire	8 October 2003
2	"The House of Straw"	Islington, North London	15 October 2003
3	"The Former Electricity Sub-Station"	Sunderland	22 October 2003
4	"The English Barn"	Berkshire	29 October 2003

=== Series 4 (2004) ===
No.	Title	Location	Original release date
1	"The Inverted-Roof House"	Buckinghamshire	4 February 2004

=== Series 5 (2005–07) ===
No.	Title	Location	Original release date
1	"19th Century Sandstone House"	Edinburgh	6 April 2005
2	"The Terrace Conversion"	Hackney, London	4 May 2005
3	"The Violin Factory"	Lambeth, London	11 May 2005
4	"The Woodsmans Cottage"	Sussex	26 October 2005
5	"The Curved House"	Clapham, London	23 November 2005
6	"19th Century Manor House"	Creuse, France	3 May 2006
7	"300 Year Old Chalet"	Les Gets, France	10 May 2006
8	"The Eco-House"	Carmarthen, Wales	28 March 2007
9	"The Sliding Glass Roof House"	Peckham, London	18 April 2007
10	"The Oak-Framed House"	Glasgow, Scotland	25 April 2007
11	"The Tuscan Castle"	Tuscany, Italy	9 May 2007

=== Series 6 (2008) ===
No.	Title	Location	Original release date
1	"Masseria Impisi: An Artists' Retreat"	Puglia, Italy	27 February 2008
2	"The Wooden Box"	Peterborough	5 March 2008
3	"Customised German Kit House"	Esher	12 March 2008
4	"The Victorian Threshing Barn"	Surrey	19 March 2008
5	"The Underground House"	Cumbria	26 March 2008

=== Series 7 (2009) ===
No.	Title	Location	Original release date
1	"The 14th Century Castle"	Skipton, North Yorkshire	18 March 2009
2	"The Cambridgeshire Eco Home"	Cambridgeshire Fens	25 March 2009
3	"The Thatched Cottage"	Hampshire	15 April 2009
4	"The Loch House"	Killearn, Scotland	22 April 2009
5	"The Woodsmans Cottage"	Sussex	29 April 2009

=== Series 8 (2010) ===
No.	Title	Location	Original release date
1	"The Brittany Groundhouse"	Brittany, France	10 November 2010
2	"The Glass & Timber House"	Dulwich, London	17 November 2010
3	"A 21st Century Answer to the Roman Villa"	Belfast, Northern Ireland	24 November 2010
4	"House from Straw"	Lot, France	1 December 2010
5	"The Water Tower"	Coleshill, Amersham	8 December 2010
6	"The Lime Kiln House"	Midlothian, Scotland	15 December 2010

=== Series 9 (2011) ===
No.	Title	Location	Original release date
1	"The Dome House"	Lake District	2 November 2011
2	"The Eco Arch"	Weald of Kent	9 November 2011
3	"The Water Tower Conversion"	Ashford, Kent	16 November 2011
4	"The Adaptahaus"	West Cumbria	23 November 2011
5	"The Headcorn Minimalist House"	Headcorn, Kent	30 November 2011

=== Series 10 (2012) ===
No.	Title	Location	Original release date
1	"The Tree House"	Isle of Wight	14 November 2012
2	"The Disco Home"	Kensington, London	21 November 2012
3	"The Large Timber-Framed Barn"	Braintree, Essex	28 November 2012
4	"The Co-Op"	Brighton	5 December 2012

=== Series 11 (2013) ===
No.	Title	Location	Original release date
1	"The Modernist Villa"	Málaga, Spain	6 November 2013
2	"The Modest Home"	Woodbridge	13 November 2013

=== Series 12 (2014) ===
No.	Title	Location	Original release date
1	"19th Century Manor House"	Creuse, France	22 October 2014
2	"The Japanese House"	Monmouthshire	29 October 2014
3	"The Crooked Chocolate Box Cottage"	Tiverton	5 November 2014

=== Series 13 (2015) ===
No.	Title	Location	Original release date
1	"Living in the City"	Various	9 July 2015
2	"Living in the Wild"	Various	16 July 2015
3	"Living in Suburbia"	Various	23 July 2015
4	"Living in the Country"	Various	30 July 2015

=== Series 14 (2015) ===
No.	Title	Location	Original release date
1	"The Floating House"	Marlow, Buckinghamshire	28 October 2015
2	"The Cross-Laminated Timber House"	Cornwall	13 November 2015

=== Series 15 (2017) ===
No.	Title	Location	Original release date
1	"The Concrete Cow-Shed"	South Somerset	30 May 2017

=== Series 16 (2017) ===
No.	Title	Location	Original release date
1	"The Recycled Timber-framed House"	Herefordshire	1 November 2017

=== Series 16 (2018) ===
No.	Title	Location	Original release date
7	"The Cob Castle"	East Devon	31 October 2018

=== Series 18 (2019) ===
No.	Title	Location	Original release date
1	"The Metal Sculptural Home"	Strathaven, South Lanarkshire	16 October 2019

=== Series 19 (2021) ===
No.	Title	Location	Original release date
1	"Lewes"	East Sussex	14 July 2021

=== Series 20 (2022) ===
No.	Title	Location	Original release date
1	"North Devon"	Devon	19 October 2022
2	"The Concrete Cow-Shed"	South Somerset	26 October 2022
3	"Ultra-Modern House"	Bolton	2 November 2022
4	"The Derelict Barns"	Devon	9 November 2022

=== Series 21 (2023) ===
No.	Title	Location	Original release date
1	"Gloucestershire Treehouse"	Dursley	11 October 2023
2	"Liskeard"	Cornwall	29 November 2023
3	"Billingshurst"	West Sussex	6 December 2023

=== Series 22 (2024) ===
No.	Title	Location	Original release date
1	"The Timber Frame Kit House"	Newhaven, East Sussex	30 October 2024

=== Series 23 (2025) ===
No.	Title	Location	Original release date
1	"Hackney Downs"	Hackney	16 April 2025
2	"Richmond"	South West London	23 April 2025
3	"Floating Timber House"	The Wirral	5 November 2025
4	"Sevenoaks"	Kent	12 November 2025

=== Series 24 (2026) ===
No.	Title	Location	Original release date
1	"The Wool Mill"	Netherton, Yorkshire	16 October 2026
2	"Bletchley"	Buckinghamshire	23 October 2026

== Kevin's Grand Design ==
No.	Title	Location	Original release date
1	"Kevin's Grand Design: The Great British Property Scandal" (Part 1)	Swindon	8 December 2011
2	"Kevin's Grand Design: The Great British Property Scandal" (Part 2)	Swindon	15 December 2011

== Grand Designs: House of the Year ==
Series	Episodes	Originally released		Average viewers (millions)
Series	Episodes	First released	Last released	Average viewers (millions)
1	4	4 November 2015	25 November 2015	TBA
2	4	24 November 2016	15 December 2016	TBA
3	4	7 November 2017	28 November 2017	TBA
4	4	7 November 2018	28 November 2018	TBA
5	4	23 October 2019	13 November 2019	TBA
6	4	17 November 2021	8 December 2021	TBA
7	4	16 November 2022	7 December 2022	TBA
8	4	19 November 2025	10 December 2025	TBA

=== Series 1 (2015) ===
No.	Title	Original release date	UK viewers (millions)
1	"Country Living"	4 November 2015	2.33
2	"House of the Year"	11 November 2015	2.02
3	"House of the Year"	18 November 2015	1.58
4	"The Final"	25 November 2015	1.63

=== Series 2 (2016) ===
No.	Title	Original release date	UK viewers (millions)
1	"Country Homes"	24 November 2016	1.73
2	"Boundary Pushers"	1 December 2016	1.31
3	"Space Makers"	8 December 2016	1.55
4	"The Winner"	15 December 2016	1.59

=== Series 3 (2017) ===
No.	Title	Original release date	UK viewers (millions)
1	"Local Materials"	7 November 2017	1.91
2	"Water"	14 November 2017	1.69
3	"Homes in the Country"	21 November 2017	1.48
4	"The Minimalists and the Winner"	28 November 2017	1.55

=== Series 4 (2018) ===
No.	Title	Original release date
1	"Houses That Dare to Be Different"	7 November 2018
2	"Houses with a Past"	14 November 2018
3	"Extreme Houses"	21 November 2018
4	"The Final"	28 November 2018

=== Series 5 (2019) ===
No.	Title	Original release date
1	"Experimental"	23 October 2019
2	"Surroundings"	30 October 2019
3	"Down to Earth"	6 November 2019
4	"The Final"	13 November 2019

=== Series 6 (2021) ===
No.	Title	Original release date
1	"Houses That Take You by Surprise"	17 November 2021
2	"Materials and Craftsmanship"	24 November 2021
3	"Problem-Solving Houses"	1 December 2021
4	"Houses That Reinvent"	8 December 2021

=== Series 7 (2022) ===
No.	Title	Original release date
1	"Hard-to-Build Houses"	16 November 2022
2	"Incredible House Transformations"	23 November 2022
3	"Pioneers"	30 November 2022
4	"Materials and Craftsmanship"	7 December 2022

=== Series 8 (2025) ===
No.	Title	Original release date
1	"Built Against All Odds"	19 November 2025
2	"Homes That Take You On A Holiday"	26 November 2025
3	"Materials and Craftsmanship"	3 December 2025
4	"Incredible Transformations"	10 December 2025

== Grand Designs: The Streets ==
Series	Episodes	Originally released	
Series	Episodes	First released	Last released
1	6	4 April 2019	9 May 2019
2	5	13 April 2022	11 May 2022
3	7	16 May 2023	27 December 2023

=== Series 1 (2019) ===
No.	Title	Original release date
1	"Terry & Olwen and Lynn"	4 April 2019
2	"Jack & Hannah and James & Shannon"	11 April 2019
3	"Paul & Blanka"	18 April 2019
4	"Chris & Roxie and Peter & Anita"	25 April 2019
5	"Sean & Dianna and Garrie & Sue"	2 May 2019
6	"Pauline & Godfrey"	9 May 2019

=== Series 2 (2022) ===
No.	Title	Original release date
1	"Carlos & Maite"	13 April 2022
2	"Vineet & Simmi and Prabhjot & Shalini"	20 April 2022
3	"John & Julia"	27 April 2022
4	"Joanna & Ben"	4 May 2022
5	"Leah & Craig and Jitinder"	11 May 2022

=== Series 3 (2023) ===
No.	Title	Original release date
1	"Nicola & Gareth and Matt & Maryellen"	16 May 2023
2	"Tim and Jitinder"	23 May 2023
3	"Jane & Richard"	30 May 2023
4	"Tom & Lori"	6 June 2023
5	"Jonathan"	13 June 2023
6	"Karen and William"	20 June 2023
7	"Joanna and Ben"	27 December 2023

== Kevin's Grandest Design ==
No.	Title	Original release date
1	"Kevin's Grandest Design"	28 August 2019
Kevin McCloud revisits his favourite projects from the past twenty years.
