= Chris Moller (architect) =

New Zealand architect and television presenter

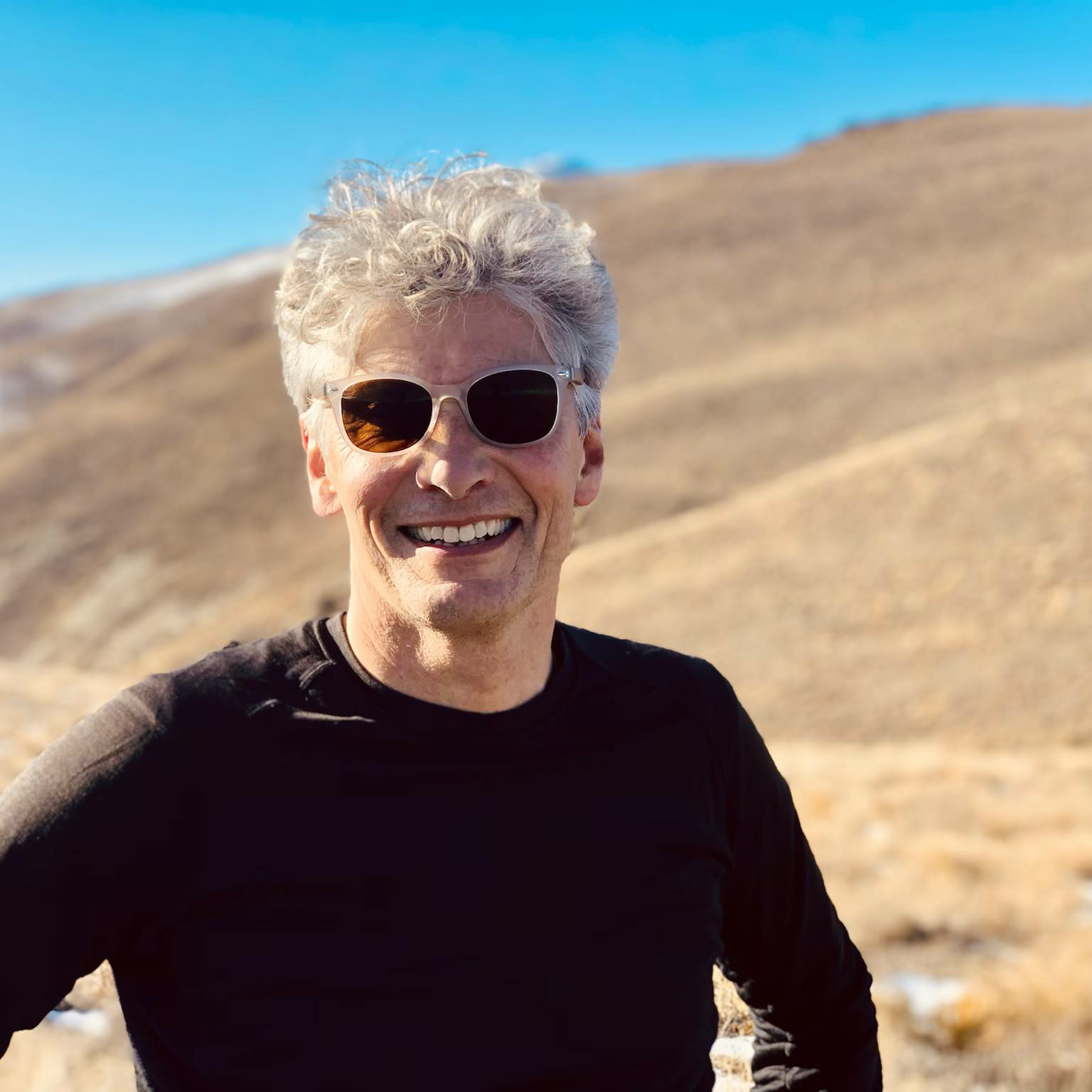

Christopher Derek Moller is a New Zealand architect and television presenter. He is best known for presenting the TV series Grand Designs New Zealand for six seasons, from 2015 through to 2020.

== Career ==
Chris Moller is a New Zealand trained architect. In 1990, when in England, he co-founded the firm S333 along with three other architects. Originally based at Studio 333 in Camberwell, South London, in 1994 the practice moved to Amsterdam, due to it having won an architectural competition for a mixed-use site in Groningen.

He was a founding board member of PrefabNZ, a non-profit organisation focused creating innovation and excellence in New Zealand homes and buildings. The group is now known as OffsiteNZ, of which Moller is a Life Member.

Moller invented and developed a building method known as Click-Raft; a method of framing using pre-cut plywood assembled into a lattice-like structure, requiring no nails or fastenings. The Stilt House which featured in Grand Designs New Zealand Season 2, Episode 4 incorporated Click-Raft into its construction.

== TV appearances ==
Producers of Grand Designs New Zealand said they had considered more than 60 possible candidates for hosting, before settling on Moller. According to Moller, he was asked three times to be the host, before he finally said yes.
