= 2013 in Australian television =

This is a list of Australian television events and premieres which occurred, or were scheduled to occur, in 2013, the 58th year of continuous operation of television in Australia.

== Events ==
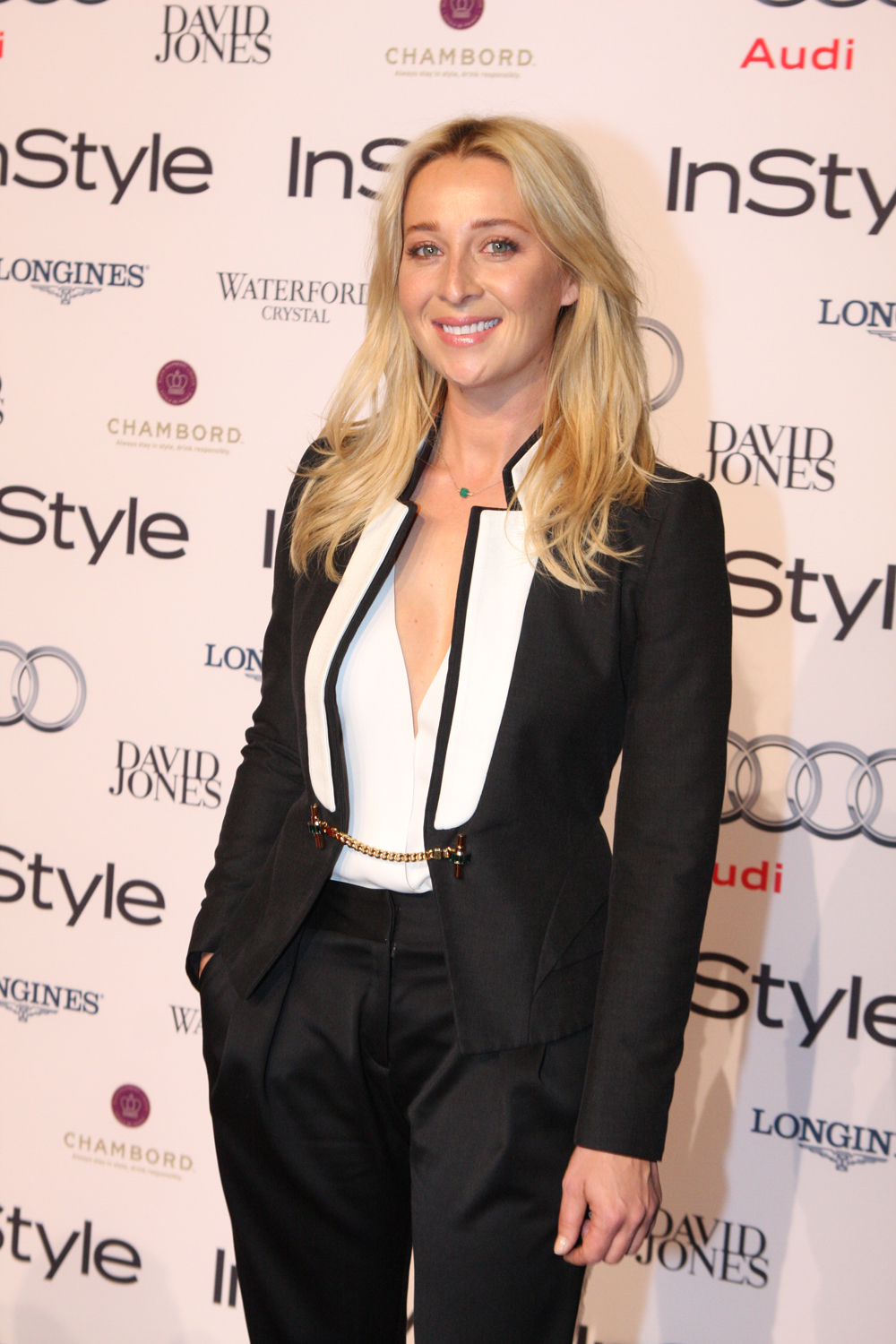
Asher Keddie, winner of the Gold Logie Award at the 2013 Logie Awards.

- 17 January – The Seven Network's longest running soap opera Home and Away celebrates its 25th anniversary.
- 18 January – The Nine Network's nightly current affairs programme A Current Affair turns 25.
- 22 February – Network Ten's CEO, James Warburton, is stood down after 14 months in the role, following a string of network ratings failures.
- 21 March – Phil Rankine and Amity Dry win an All-Stars edition of The Block.
- 1 April – SBS revamps SBS 2 with an aim on a youth-oriented audience.
- 7 April – Asher Keddie wins the Gold Logie Award for Most Popular Personality on Australian Television at the 2013 Logie Awards.
- 17 April – The court bans Mel B from appearing on Channel Nine's Australia's Got Talent. Instead she will continue with Channel Seven for an indefinite long run.
- 26 April – Days of Our Lives the US soap opera finishes its long 45-year run on the Nine Network, ending a 4-decade tradition of Daytime Soap operas in Australian Free-to-air Television. 6 years later, the program returns to Nine along with The Young and the Restless airing from 2 September on 9Gem
- 28 April – Dan and Steph Mulheron win the fourth season of My Kitchen Rules.
- 16 May – Cricketer Andrew Symonds wins the first series of Celebrity Splash!.
- 29 May – Robyn and Katie Dyke win the eighth season of The Biggest Loser.
- 17 June – Harrison Craig wins the second season of The Voice.
- 1 July – Carly Schulz and Leighton Brow win the first season of House Rules.
- 28 July – Alisa and Lysandra Fraser win the seventh season of The Block.
- 27 August – Nancy Ho wins the first series of The Great Australian Bake Off.
- 24 September – Melissa Juratowitch wins the eighth season of Australia's Next Top Model.
- 16 October – Hillal Kara-Ali wins the sixth and final season of The Mole, taking home $180,000 in prize money. Erin Dooley is revealed as the Mole, and Aisha Jefcoate is the runner-up.
- 28 October – Dami Im wins the fifth season of The X Factor.
- 2 November – Channel Seven again bans Mel B from appearing on Channel Ten's The Project in the last minute before it goes to air.
- 6 November – Tim Dormer wins the tenth season of Big Brother.
- 10 November – Music trio Uncle Jed win the seventh season of Australia's Got Talent.
- 26 November – Illusionist Cosentino and his partner Jessica Raffa win the thirteenth season of Dancing with the Stars.
- 10 December – The final analogue signals are turned off in Melbourne and Surrounds as well as Remote Central and Eastern Australia, bringing an end to 57 years of analogue broadcasting in Australia.

== Deaths ==
Name	Date	Age	Notability	Reference Section
Bille Brown, AM	13 January	(aged 61),	Playwright and actor who appeared in numerous television series.	
Patricia Lovell, AM, MBE	26 January	aged 83	Australian film producer, best known to a generation as star of children's television series Mr. Squiggle as Miss Pat in the 1960s and 1970s.	
Peter Harvey	2 March	aged 68,	journalist with the Nine Network for 38 years.	
Maureen Duval	27 June	aged 80	Host of Good Morning Sydney from 1978 to 1989, and later a panellist on Beauty and the Beast.	
Joyce Jacobs	15 September	aged 91,	English-born Australian actress who appeared in A Country Practice from 1981 to 1994.	
Alan Coleman	10 December	aged 76	English-Australian director, producer, and screenwriter	
Johnny Lockwood	10 December	92	British Australia actor, star of Number 96	
Brian Moll	9 August	aged 88	British Australian actor The Young Doctors and A Country Practice	
Binny Lum,		(aged 97),	Pioneering radio and television personality	

== Channels ==
=== New channels ===
- 28 March – eXtra^{2}
- 17 September – Spree TV
- 22 or 25 November – Fresh Ideas TV

=== Renamed channels ===
- 1 January – Foxtel Movies (replacing both Showtime and Movie Network)
- 2 April – SBS 2 (rename of SBS TWO)

== Digital television transition ==
=== Analogue switch-off ===
The switch-off of analogue television was completed in 2013, with the following areas being the last to be switched off:

- 2 April – Adelaide
- 9 April – Tasmania
- 16 April – Perth
- 28 May – Brisbane, Gold Coast
- 25 June – Regional Western Australia
- 28 July – Darwin
- 3 December – Sydney
- 10 December – Melbourne, Remote Central and Eastern Australia

=== Restack/Retune ===
Restack was the official name, and Retune was the more consumer-friendly name, given to the change in frequency of many digital television stations following analog switch-off. The main purpose was to clear channels 52–69 in the 700 MHz band for reuse in mobile communications. Channels 9 & 9A were also cleared so that they could be used for DAB+. Many remote areas were excluded, their stations didn't change frequency and channel 9 & 9A continue to be used in some remote areas for digital television.

The restack began in April 2013 and was completed by the end of 2014.

== Premieres ==
=== Domestic series ===
List of domestic television series premieres on Australian television in 2013
Program	Original airdate	Network	Ref
Nine News Now	7 January	Nine Network	
Next Stop Hollywood	8 January	ABC1	
Off Their Rockers	13 January	The Comedy Channel	
MasterChef Australia: The Professionals	20 January	Network Ten	
Last Chance to See Cuba	23 January	SBS ONE	
The Doctor Blake Mysteries	1 February	ABC1	
Live Healthy, Be Happy	3 February	Seven Network	
ABC News: Early Edition	4 February	ABC1; ABC News 24	
The Agony of Life	6 February	ABC1	
The Crew	10 February	Fuel TV	
Making Couples Happy	14 February	ABC1	
Good Game: Pocket Edition	16 February	ABC3	
Steam Punks!	17 February	ABC3	
Mr & Mrs Murder	20 February	Network Ten	
Mind Over Maddie	25 February	Disney Channel	
Please Like Me	28 February	ABC2	
Monday Night with Matty Johns	4 March	Fox Sports	
NRL 360	6 March	Fox Sports	
Tractor Monkeys	20 March	ABC1	
The Checkout	21 March	ABC1	
Ask The Butcher	26 March	LifeStyle Food	
Australia's Deadliest	30 March	Nat Geo Wild	
The Elegant Gentleman's Guide to Knife Fighting	3 April	ABC1	
A Place to Call Home	28 April	Seven Network	
Colour Theory	28 April	NITV	
Celebrity Splash	29 April	Seven Network	
Head First	1 May	ABC2	
Wentworth	1 May	SoHo	
Shane Delia's Spice Journey	2 May	SBS ONE	
Financial Review Sunday	5 May	Nine Network	
Play Along with Sam	6 May	Nick Jr.	
Aussie Pickers	9 May	A&E Australia	
House Rules	14 May	Seven Network	
Marion's Thailand	14 May	LifeStyle Food	
Dirty Laundry Live	16 May	ABC2	
The Feed	20 May	SBS 2	
Spontaneous Saturday	20 May	SBS 2	
Croc College	21 May	ABC1	
The Observer Effect	2 June	SBS ONE	
The Truth Is	3 June	Network Ten	
Reef Doctors	9 June	Network Ten	
The Time of Our Lives	16 June	ABC1	
Australia's Remote Islands	16 June	ABC1	
The Daily Edition	17 June	Seven Network	
The Years That Made Us	23 June	ABC1	
River Cottage Australia	27 June	The LifeStyle Channel	
Wednesday Night Fever	3 July	ABC1	
Shitsville Express	2 July	ABC2	
Vicky the Viking	6 July	Network Ten	
Hamish & Andy's Gap Year Asia	8 July	Nine Network	
Wanted	8 July	Network Ten	
The Great Australian Bake Off	9 July	Nine Network	
First Footprints	14 July	ABC1	
Walking Through History	20 July	SBS ONE	
This Week Live	24 July	Network Ten	
Formal Wars	25 July	Seven Network	
Mako: Island of Secrets	26 July	Network Ten	
Movie Mayhem with Mark Fennell	27 July	SBS 2	
Nine News at 7:00	5 August	GEM	
Seven News at 7	5 August	7TWO	
Slide Show	7 August	Seven Network	
It's a Date	15 August	ABC1	
Upper Middle Bogan	15 August	ABC1	
Wonderland	21 August	Network Ten	
Recipe to Riches	27 August	Network Ten	
The Bachelor Australia	8 September	Network Ten	
Ready, Steady, Wiggle!	11 September	ABC2	
Revealed	12 September	Network Ten	
Million Dollar Minute	16 September	Seven Network	
Ten Eyewitness News	16 September	Network Ten	
A League of Their Own	16 September	Network Ten	
Julia Zemiro's Home Delivery	18 September	ABC1	
The Day My Butt Went Psycho	21 September	GO!	
Serangoon Road	22 September	ABC1	
Legally Brown	23 September	SBS ONE	
The Darren Sanders Show	2 October	GO!	
Time of My Life	5 October	7TWO	
WOW: World on Wheels	6 October	7mate	
Nine Afternoon News Perth	7 October	Nine Network (Perth)	
Deadbeat Dads	7 October	MTV	
Thursday FC	10 October	SBS 2	
ReDesign My Brain	10 October	ABC1	
Business Agenda SA	12 October	Nine Network (Adelaide)	
It's a Lifestyle TV	12 October	Network Ten	
Ironman: Deep Water	13 October	Nine Network	
Phil Spencer: Secret Agent Down Under	14 October	LifeStyle	
Santo, Sam & Ed's Total Football	14 October	Fox Sports 1	
Wild Life of Tim Faulkner	20 October	Nine Network	
#7DaysLater	22 October	ABC2	
Lessons From the Grave	23 October	ABC1	
Ja'mie: Private School Girl	23 October	ABC1	
Summer 360	23 October	Fox Sports 1	
Embarrassing Bodies Down Under	29 October	LifeStyle You	
Have You Been Paying Attention?	3 November	Network Ten	
Pilgrimage with Simon Reeve	3 November	SBS ONE	
Hi-5 House	4 November	Nick Jr.	
Studio 10	4 November	Network Ten	
Studio 10 You	4 November	Network Ten	
Ten Eyewitness Early News	4 November	Network Ten	
Ten Eyewitness Morning News	4 November	Network Ten	
Wake Up	4 November	Network Ten	
Paddock to Plate	6 November	The LifeStyle Channel	
Nowhere Boys	7 November	ABC3	
Exhumed	14 November	ABC1	
Coast Australia	2 December	The History Channel	
Come Date with Me	8 December	Eleven	
Outback Coroner	9 December	Crime & Investigation Network	
Peleda	2013	ABC3	

=== International series ===
List of international television series premieres on Australian television in 2013
Program	Original airdate	Network	Country of origin	Ref
The Wild Chef	1 January	SBS Two	Canada	
Defying Gravity	2 January	One	United States; Canada; United Kingdom; Germany	
Pramface	3 January	ABC2	United Kingdom	
This is Jinsy	3 January	ABC2	United Kingdom	
Nigellissima	3 January	ABC1	United Kingdom	
Ladyboys	4 January	ABC2	United Kingdom	
Ultimate Spider-Man	5 January	Seven Network	United States	
Black Cab Sessions USA	5 January	SBS ONE	United States	
Gator 911	6 January	One	United States	
Rev.	6 January	ABC1	United Kingdom	
Baggage Battles	7 January	A&E	United States	
Watson & Oliver	7 January	UKTV	United Kingdom	
Doc Martin France	7 January	SBS Two	France	
Golden	7 January	Network Ten	New Zealand	
The Story of Film: An Odyssey	8 January	SBS Two	United Kingdom	
My Big Fat Operation	9 January	ABC2	United Kingdom	
Lab Rats	10 January	Disney Channel	United States	
Chicago Fire	10 January	Fox8	United States	
1600 Penn	13 January	The Comedy Channel	United States	
Britain's Empty Homes	13 January	7TWO	United Kingdom	
The Carrie Diaries	15 January	Fox8	United States	
Murder in Mind	16 January	7TWO	United Kingdom	
Prisoners of War	19 January	SBS ONE	Israel	
David Attenborough's The Blue Planet	19 January	Network Ten	United Kingdom	
DEA	21 January	7mate	United States	
Undercover Boss Canada	22 January	One	Canada	
Set List	24 January	ABC2	United Kingdom	
The Mindy Project	28 January	Seven Network	United States	
Pokémon: Black & White: Rival Destinies	28 January	Eleven	Japan	
Against the Wall	29 January	Seven Network	United States	
Here Comes Honey Boo Boo	31 January	Discovery Home & Health	United States	
Outback Hunters	31 January	A&E	United States	
The Paradise	2 February	ABC1	United Kingdom	
Elementary	3 February	Network Ten	United States	
Katie	4 February	Arena	United States	
Romanzo Criminale	5 February	Showcase	Italy	
The Last Leg	6 February^{[a]}	ABC1	United Kingdom	
Monty Halls' Great Irish Escape	8 February	SBS ONE	United Kingdom	
Kevin McCloud's Man Made Home	10 February	ABC1	United Kingdom	
David Attenborough's Africa	16 February	Network Ten	United Kingdom	
Last Resort	20 February	Seven Network	United States	
Parade's End	6 March	Nine Network (Aired 1st week); GEM (Aired 2nd week)	United Kingdom; United States; Belgium	
The Fades	18 March	ABC2	United Kingdom	
Transporter: The Series	20 March	FX	United States; Germany; Canada; France	
Wild Things with Dominic Monaghan	23 March	ABC2	United Kingdom	
Dog With a Blog	25 March	Disney Channel	United States	
Marco Pierre White's Kitchen Wars	28 March	SBS ONE	United Kingdom	
Lilyhammer	30 March	SBS ONE	Norway	
Toy Hunter	2 April	A&E	United States	
The Following	9 April	Nine Network	United States	
What's Your Emergency?	10 April	Nine Network	United Kingdom	
Mrs Biggs	14 April	Seven Network	United Kingdom	
Parkinson: Masterclass	14 April	ABC1	United Kingdom	
Anthony Bourdain: Parts Unknown	15 April	CNN	United States	
Yu-Gi-Oh! Zexal	15 April	GO!	Japan	
Da Vinci's Demons	16 April	FX	United States	
Hannibal	17 April	Seven Network	United States	
Strangeways	17 April	Seven Network	United Kingdom	
Citizen Khan	18 April	Seven Network	United Kingdom	
Defiance	18 April	SF Channel	United States	
Crash & Bernstein	19 April	Disney Channel	United States	
Urban Secrets	19 April	SBS ONE	United Kingdom	
Chasing The Saturdays	23 April	E!	United States	
Arrow	1 May^{[b]}	Nine Network	United States	
Attenborough: 60 Years in the Wild	6 May	Network Ten	United Kingdom	
Gok's Style Secrets	15 May	LifeStyle You	United Kingdom	
Longmire	15 May	GEM	United States	
Bates Motel	20 May (on demand); 26 May	Fox8	United States	
Major Crimes	20 May	Nine Network^{[c]}	United States	
Beauty & the Beast	22 May	Network Ten^{[d]}	United States	
The Americans	27 May	Network Ten	United States	
The Audience	27 May	ABC2	United Kingdom	
Would You Rather...? with Graham Norton	30 May	One	United States	
Brain Games	2 June	National Geographic Channel	United States	
Killer Karaoke	9 June	The Comedy Channel	United States	
The Sex Show	11 June	SBS Two	Norway	
Chosen	16 June	FX	United States	
Hotel Hell	17 June	Nine Network	United States	
Vice	19 June	Fox8	United States	
Under the Dome	25 June	Network Ten	United States	
Mickey Mouse	1 July	Disney Channel	United States	
Red Widow	1 July	Seven Network	United States	
Cardinal Burns	2 July	The Comedy Channel	United Kingdom	
Ray Donovan	2 July	Showcase	United States	
Twisted	9 July	Fox8	United States	
The Wanted Life	9 July	E!	United States	
The Bridge	11 July	FX	United States	
Broadchurch	12 July	ABC1	United Kingdom	
Mankind: The Story of All of Us	12 July	The History Channel		
The Bible	16 July	Nine Network	United States	
Legit	25 July	The Comedy Channel	United States	
Ripper Street	28 July	Network Ten	United Kingdom; United States	
Cyndi Lauper: Still So Unusual	4 August	Bio.	United States	
Mr. Selfridge	5 August	Seven Network	United Kingdom	
My Little Pony: Friendship is Magic	5 August	Eleven	United States; Canada	
Hotel Secrets	5 August	Seven Network	United Kingdom	
Brickleberry	7 August	The Comedy Channel	United States	
Princesses: Long Island	7 August	Arena	United States	
Vikings	8 August	SBS ONE	United States	
Banshee	14 August	Fox8	United States	
Million Dollar Intern	25 August	BBC Knowledge	United Kingdom	
City Girl Diaries	26 August	Style Network	United States	
Low Winter Sun	27 August^{[e]}	FX	United States	
Doc McStuffins	1 September	Seven Network	United States; Ireland	
Littlest Pet Shop (2012)	1 September	Eleven	United States; Canada	
Unsupervised	4 September	Eleven	United States	
Save with Jamie	5 September	Network Ten	United Kingdom	
The White Queen	5 September	SoHo	United Kingdom	
Hello Ross	7 September	E!	United States	
Bethenny	10 September	Arena	United States	
In the Flesh	10 September	SBS Two	United Kingdom	
Rise of the Continents	10 September	ABC1	United Kingdom	
Sleepy Hollow	17 September	Network Ten	United States	
Ultimate Airport Dubai	17 September	National Geographic Channel		
Madhur Jaffrey's Curry Nation	22 September	SBS ONE	United Kingdom	
From Scratch	23 September	SBS ONE	United Kingdom	
Big School	24 September	Nine Network	United Kingdom	
The Face	24 September	Fox8	United States	
The Neighbors	28 September	Seven Network	United States	
Penguins: Spy in the Huddle	28 September	Network Ten	United Kingdom	
Classic Car Rescue	28 September	7mate	United States	
Inside West Coast Customs	28 September	7mate	United States	
Family Tools	29 September	Seven Network	United States	
Baby Daddy	29 September	Fox8	United States	
The Blacklist	30 September	Seven Network	United States	
Mistresses	30 September	Seven Network	United States	
Million Dollar Catch	30 September	One	New Zealand	
Hello Ladies	30 September	Showcase	United Kingdom	
Family S.O.S. with Jo Frost	1 October	Discovery Home & Health	United States	
Agents of S.H.I.E.L.D.	2 October	Seven Network	United States	
Men at Work	2 October	Seven Network	United States	
Masters of Sex	3 October	SBS ONE	United States	
Deception	4 October	7TWO	Ireland	
Doc McStuffins	4 October	Disney Channel	United States; Ireland	
Full Force Nature	5 October	7TWO	United States	
Secret Life of Predators	6 October	National Geographic Channel	United States	
Q Pootle 5	7 October	ABC2	United Kingdom	
Live at the Electric	7 October	SBS 2	United Kingdom	
The Doozers	7 October	Disney Channel	United States	
Hostages	9 October^{[f]}	Nine Network	United States	
Political Animals	9 October	Nine Network	United States	
Orange Is the New Black	9 October	Showcase	United States	
Doomsday Bunkers	10 October	7mate	United States	
Liv and Maddie	11 October	Disney Channel	United States	
Sam & Cat	11 October	Nickelodeon	United States	
24/7 Wild	12 October	SBS ONE	United Kingdom	
Sullivan & Son	12 October	Nine Network	United States	
The North Sea	12 October	7mate	United Kingdom	
Super Fun Night	15 October	Nine Network	United States	
Pagans and Pilgrims	15 October	SBS ONE	United Kingdom	
Vinnie Jones: Russia's Toughest	15 October	National Geographic Channel	United Kingdom	
God, Guns & Automobiles	16 October	A&E	United States	
Real Husbands of Hollywood	16 October	The Comedy Channel	United States	
The Returned	16 October	Studio	France	
Jamie and Jimmy's Food Fight Club	17 October	Network Ten	United Kingdom	
The Fall	19 October	UKTV	United Kingdom	
Sunny Skies	20 October	Eleven	New Zealand	
The Crazy Ones	20 October	Fox8	United States	
Big Angry Fish	21 October	One	New Zealand	
Zach Stone Is Gonna Be Famous	21 October	MTV	United States	
Hounds	24 October	One	New Zealand	
I Dream of NeNe: The Wedding	24 October	Arena	United States	
The New Atlanta	24 October	Arena	United States	
A Different Breed	25 October	ABC2	United Kingdom	
Oprah's Master Class	27 October	Discovery Home & Health	United States	
David Attenborough's Natural Curiosities	3 November	Network Ten	United Kingdom	
The Soup Investigates	3 November	E!	United States	
Transformers: Rescue Bots	4 November	Eleven	United States	
Sofia the First	10 November	Seven Network	United States	
Bear Grylls: Escape From Hell	13 November	Discovery Channel	United States	
The Originals	13 November	GO!	United States	
DreamWorks Dragons	14 November	ABC3	United States	
Secrets of Wild India	17 November	Nine Network	United Kingdom	
Wild Animal Baby Explorers	18 November	ABC2	United States	
Hellfjord	18 November	SBS ONE	Norway	
Kobushi	25 November	ABC3	Japan; France	
Airplane Repo	10 December	Discovery Channel	United States	
Total Drama All-Stars and Pahkitew Island	12 December	ABC3	Canada	
Underbelly NZ: Land of the Long Green Cloud	28 December	GO!	New Zealand	
The Taste	29 December	GEM	United States	
Partners	30 December	Nine Network	United States	

=== Telemovies ===
Domestic telemovie premieres on Australian television in 2013
Telemovie	Original airdate(s)	Network	Ref
Cliffy	26 May	ABC1	
I Am You	18 August	ABC1	
An Accidental Soldier	15 September	ABC1	
Carlotta	2013	ABC1	
The Broken Shore	2013	ABC1	
Sundowner	TBA	Nine Network	

International telemovie premieres on Australian television in 2013
Telemovie	Original airdate(s)	Network	Country of origin	Ref
Case Sensitive: The Other Half Lives	4 May	ABC1	United Kingdom	
Sharknado	26 July	Universal Channel	United States	
Teen Beach Movie	9 August	Disney Channel	United States	
Killing Kennedy	19 November	National Geographic Channel	United States	
Reckless	TBA	Network Ten	United States	
Room on the Broom	TBA	ABC 4 Kids (ABC2)	United Kingdom	

=== Miniseries ===
Domestic miniseries premieres on Australian television in 2013
Miniseries	Original airdate(s)	Network	Ref
Top of the Lake	24 March	UKTV	
Paper Giants: Magazine Wars	2, 9 June	ABC1	
Better Man	25 July, 1 August	SBS ONE	
Power Games: The Packer-Murdoch War	8, 15 September	Nine Network	
The Gallipoli Story	TBA	(Foxtel)	
The House of Hancock	TBA	(Foxtel)	

International miniseries premieres on Australian television in 2013
Miniseries	Original airdate(s)	Network	Country of origin	Ref
Labyrinth	27 January, 3 February	SoHo	Germany; South Africa	
Hatfields & McCoys	1 June	Showcase	United States	
Political Animals	9 October	Nine Network	United States	
Secret State	23 November	UKTV	United Kingdom	

=== Documentary specials ===
Domestic documentary premieres on Australian television in 2013
Documentary	Original airdate(s)	Network	Ref
Dirty Business: How Mining Made Australia	6 January	SBS ONE	
Coniston	14 January	ABC1	
The Train: The Granville Disaster	18 January	The History Channel	
ABBA: Bang a Boomerang	30 January	ABC1	
Jabbed: Love, Fear and Vaccines	26 May	SBS ONE	
Fat and Back	22 July	One	
Malcolm Naden: Australia's Most Hunted	11 September	Seven Network	
Eric Smith: Not Finished Yet	12 September	Studio	
Kakadu	6 October	ABC1	
Yagan	6 October	ABC1	
The Art of Australia	22 October	ABC1	
JFK: The Smoking Gun	3 November	SBS ONE	
The Artist's Story: Tina Arena	21 November	Max	
Body Line: The Ultimate Test	TBA	TBA	
Canberra Confidential	TBA	ABC1	
Ian Thorpe: The Swimmer	TBA	ABC1	
Life on Us	TBA	SBS ONE	
Once Upon a Time in Carlton	TBA	SBS ONE	
Once Upon a Time in Punchbowl	TBA	SBS ONE	
Our Little Secret	TBA	ABC1	
Race for Beauty	TBA	SBS ONE	
Peter Sculthorpe, A Journey Through My Life	TBA	ABC1	
The Sharp End	TBA	ABC1	
Surgery Ship	TBA	SBS ONE	
The War That Changed Us	TBA	ABC1	
Welcome to Puntland	TBA	SBS ONE	

International documentary premieres on Australian television in 2013
Documentary	Original airdate(s)	Network	Country of origin	Ref
Welcome to India	2 January	SBS ONE	United Kingdom	
Our Queen	9, 16 May	ABC1	United Kingdom	
Dear mother, Love Cher	12 May	Bio.	United States	
The Fighters	17, 18 May	CNN International	United States	
The Grammar of Happiness	2 July	ABC1	United States	
Agnetha: ABBA and After	2 July	Nine Network	United Kingdom	
Abba: When Four Becomes One	3 September	Seven Network	United Kingdom	
Abba: Absolute Image	10 September	Seven Network	United Kingdom	
Sound City	12 September	Max	United States	
The Man with the Biggest Testicles	25 September	Seven Network	United Kingdom	
H. G. Wells: War with the World	27 September	History	United Kingdom	
Rihanna 777	29 September	Channel [V]	United States	
I'm a Teenage Grandmother	10 October	Seven Network	United Kingdom	
Autopsy on a Dream	20 October	ABC1	United Kingdom	
David Attenborough: Animal Attraction	20 October	Network Ten	United Kingdom	
Crazy About One Direction	22 October	GO!	United Kingdom	
Attenborough's Ark	27 October	Network Ten	United Kingdom	
Giant Otters of the Amazon	TBA	Network Ten	United Kingdom	
Living with Baboons	TBA	Network Ten	United Kingdom	
Operation Iceberg	TBA	Network Ten	United Kingdom	
Snow Babies	TBA	Network Ten	United Kingdom	

=== Specials ===
Domestic television special premieres on Australian television in 2013
Television special	Original airdate(s)	Network(s)	Ref
Adam Hills Stands Up Live	23 January	ABC1	
Australian of the Year 2013	25 January	ABC1	
Australia Celebrates 2013	25 January	ABC1	
The Australia Day Showdown: You Can Never Be Too Australian	26 January	Network Ten	
2012 Melbourne International Comedy Festival Great Debate	27 January	Network Ten	
2nd AACTA Awards 2013	30 January	Network Ten	
The Allan Border Medal 2013	4 February	GEM	
Shock, Horror, Aunty.	6, 13 February	ABC1	
Seven News Special: Drugs in Footy Summit	14 February	Seven Network	
Hello. My name is Flume.	22 February	Channel [V]	
Future Music Festival 2013	16 March	Channel [V]	
2013 MTV Movie Awards	15 April	MTV Australia	
The People's Forum with Tony Abbott	18 April	Sky News Australia	
The People's Forum with Julia Gillard	22 April	Sky News Australia	
2013 Melbourne International Comedy Festival Debate	11 May	Network Ten	
The Biggest Loser's Biggest Ever Makeovers	24 June, 1 July	Network Ten	
Killing Bin Laden: A Ten News Special	25 June	Network Ten	
Brendon Burns: So I Suppose This is Offensive Now	19 July	The Comedy Channel	
Bali: The Dark Side of Paradise	21 July	Nine Network	
It's Cabaret	22 July	Studio	
Anh Does Britain	23, 30 July	Seven Network	
Brendon Burns: Sober Not Clean	26 July	The Comedy Channel	
2013 Helpmann Awards	29 July	Arena	
Shadow of Doubt	29 July	Crime & Investigation Network	
Cosentino: The Magic, The Mystery, The Madness	27 August	Seven Network	
2013 Deadly Awards	15 September	SBS ONE	
Just for Laughs: Aussies in Montreal	18 September	Seven Network	
Paul Kelly: Stories of Me	27 October	ABC1	
No Laughing Matter	1 November	The Comedy Channel	
2013 Walkley Awards	28 November	ABC3	
2013 ARIA Awards	1 December	GO!	
Sydney New Year's Eve	31 December	ABC	Australia

International television special premieres on Australian television in 2013
Television special	Original airdate(s)	Network(s)	Country of origin	Ref
New Year's Day Concert	1 January	SBS ONE	Austria	
70th Golden Globe Awards	14 January	Arena	United States	
Just For Laughs: Montreal Comedy Festival Gala 2012	20 January	Network Ten	Canada	
19th Screen Actors Guild Awards	28 January	TV1	United States	
2013 Billboard Music Awards	27 February	SBS ONE	United Kingdom	
Selling Spelling Manor	18, 25 April	LifeStyle Home	United States	
Ryan Seacrest with the Kardashians	26 April	E!	United States	
Gok Wan: Made in China	2 May	LifeStyle You	United Kingdom	
2013 Billboard Music Awards	20 May	Channel [V]	United States	
2013 Guys' Choice Awards	22 June	FX	United States	
Will & Kate Plus One	20 July	CNN	United States	
David Bowie: Five Years in the Making of an Icon	24 July	ABC2	United Kingdom	
Doctor Who Revisited	18 August	UKTV	United States	
65th Primetime Emmy Awards	23 September	Fox8	United States	
The Bravest Girl in the World	14 October	CNN	United States	
Crazy About One Direction	22 October	GO!	United Kingdom	
Asia-Pacific Broadcasting Union TV Song Festival 2013	9 November	SBS 2	Vietnam	

== Programming changes ==
=== Changes to network affiliation ===
Criterion for inclusion in the following list is that Australian premiere episodes will air in Australia for the first time on the new network. This includes when a programme is moved from a free-to-air network's primary channel to a digital multi-channel, as well as when a program moves between subscription television channels – provided the preceding criterion is met. Ended television series which change networks for repeat broadcasts are not included in the list.

Domestic television series which changed network affiliation in 2013
Programme	Date	New network	Previous network	Ref
It's Academic	1 January	7TWO	Seven Network	
Match It	1 January	7TWO	Seven Network	
Yamba's Playtime	1 January	GO!	Nine Network	
William & Sparkles' Magical Tales	1 January	GO!	Nine Network	
Pyramid	1 January	GO!	Nine Network	
Kitchen Whiz	1 January	GO!	Nine Network	
Wakkaville	5 January	GO!	Nine Network	
Pixel Pinkie	5 January	GO!	Nine Network	
Fast Forward's Funniest Send-Ups	31 January	One	Seven Network	
Kids' WB	16 February	GO!^{[g]}	Nine Network	
Reef Doctors	29 June	Eleven	Network Ten (Axed after Two Episodes)	
Australia's Got Talent	11 August	Nine Network	Seven Network	
Wurrawhy	4 November	Eleven	Network Ten	
Totally Wild	4 November	Eleven	Network Ten	
Scope	7 November	Eleven	Network Ten	
Mako: Island of Secrets	8 November	Eleven	Network Ten	
Paradise Cafe	9 November	Eleven	Network Ten	
Vicky the Viking	9 November	Eleven	Network Ten	
H_{2}O: Just Add Water	9 November	Eleven	Network Ten	

International television series which changed network affiliation in 2013
Program	Date	New network	Previous network	Country of origin	Ref
American Idol	17 January	Network Ten	Fox8	United States	
The Looney Tunes Show	1 July	Boomerang	Cartoon Network	United States	
Peppa Pig	TBA	CBeebies	Nick Jr.	United Kingdom	

=== Free-to-air premieres ===
This is a list of programs which made their premiere on Australian free-to-air television that had previously premiered on Australian subscription television. Programs may still air on the original subscription television network.

Program	Date	Free-to-air network	Subscription network(s)	Country of origin	Ref
Outback Wrangler	6 January	One	Nat Geo Wild	Australia	
Mark Berg's Fishing Addiction	7 January	One	LifeStyle	Australia	
Hell on Wheels	7 January	ABC2	FX	United States	
Extreme Engineering	25 January	7mate	Discovery Science	United States	
Monster Jam	26 January	One	Speed	United States	
Creative Minds	26 January	SBS ONE	Studio	Australia	
Python Hunters	28 January	One	Nat Geo Wild	United States	
American Restoration	28 January	7mate	A&E	United States	
Auction Hunters	5 February	GO!	Discovery	United States	
Aqua Teen Hunger Force	1 April	SBS 2	The Comedy Channel	United States	
Teenage Mutant Ninja Turtles	30 June	Eleven	Nickelodeon	United States	
My Little Pony: Friendship Is Magic	4 August	Eleven	Boomerang	United States	
Inventions That Shook The World	24 September	7TWO	History	United States	
Lost Girl	1 October	SBS 2	Sci Fi	Canada	
Never Mind the Buzzcocks	3 October	ABC2	BBC UKTV	United Kingdom	
Don't Trust the B— in Apartment 23	8 October	Eleven	Arena	United States	
Beyond Survival	14 October	SBS 2	Discovery	Canada	
Hardliners	21 October	One	A&E	Australia	
The Sarah Silverman Program	30 October	SBS 2	The Comedy Channel	United States	
Revolution	5 November	Nine Network	Fox8	United States	

=== Subscription premieres ===
This is a list of programs which made their premiere on Australian subscription television that had previously premiered on Australian free-to-air television. Programs may still air on the original free-to-air television network.

International television series that premiered on Australian free-to-air television in 2012
Program	Date	Free-to-air network	Subscription network(s)	Country of origin	Ref

=== Endings ===
Ending domestic television series on Australian television in 2013
Program	End date	Network	Start date	Ref
The Price Is Right (repeats)	10 January	Seven Network	07 May	
Home and Away (Friday)	18 March	Seven Network	1988	
Celebrity Splash!	16 May	Seven Network	29 April	
Nine Afternoon News (local edition)	28 June	Nine Network (Perth)	2012	
Packed to the Rafters	2 July	Seven Network	2008	
Ten News At Five	15 September	Network Ten	21 July 2008	
Before the Game	27 September	Network Ten	1 March 2003	
Dance Academy	30 September	ABC3	2010	
The Game Plan (NRL)	3 October	One	2011	
Nine News at 7.00	25 October^{[h]}	GEM	5 August	
Inside Business	1 December	ABC1	2002	
Deal Or No Deal	29 November	Seven Network	13 July 2003	2003

=== Returning this year ===
Returning domestic television series on Australian television in 2013
Program	Return date	Network	Original run	Ref
The Mole	2 July	Seven Network	2000–2005	
Talking Footy	26 August	Seven Network	1994–2002	

== See also ==
- 2013 in Australia
- List of Australian films of 2013

== Notes ==
- ^{a} The Last Leg was originally scheduled to air on 17 February 2013 before being rescheduled to premiere on 6 February 2013 instead.
- ^{b} Arrow was originally scheduled to air on 16 April 2013 before being rescheduled to premiere on 1 May 2013 instead.
- ^{c} After being removed from the Nine Network's schedule due to poor ratings, Major Crimes began airing on Nine's digital multichannel GEM from 24 June instead.
- ^{d} The pilot episode of Beauty and the Beast originally screened on Network Ten, however—due to poor ratings—subsequent episodes aired on Ten's digital multichannel Eleven instead.
- ^{e} Low Winter Sun was originally scheduled to air on 13 August before being rescheduled to premiere on 27 August instead.
- ^{f} Hostages was originally scheduled to air on 2 October before being rescheduled to premiere on 9 October instead.
- ^{g} Although the Kids' WB block had aired on GO! since the channel's launch in 2009, it had also continued airing episodes on the Nine Network until 31 December 2012. Starting 1 January, the entire children's programming along with Kids' WB began to air solely on GO! due to new fines in the Nine Network Code of Practice.
