= Sabour (disambiguation) =

Sabour is a Union Council of Gujrat District, Punjab province, Pakistan.

Sabour may also refer to:

- Sabour Bradley (f. 2010s), Australian filmmaker, writer and broadcaster
- Salah Abdel Sabour (1931–1981), Egyptian free verse poet, editor, playwright and essayist
- Sabour., taxonomic author abbreviation of Raymond Sabouraud (1864–1938), French physician
- Sabour, Bhagalpur, Bihar, India
