= Extreme Tourist Afghanistan =

Television Documentary Series

Extreme Tourist Afghanistan is a television documentary series written, directed and presented by Sabour Bradley that explores life in Afghanistan.

== Production ==
The series had its world premiere in the UK on Current TV on 25 January 2011 and has screened in more than 150 countries on channels including Nat Geo Adventure, Fox Traveler. In French-speaking territories, it is called Bienvenue Chez Les Afghans in French and was screened by Canal+ and CanalSat. The series was produced by Afghan television production company Kaboora Productions, post-produced by UK production company Speak-It Films and distributed by the UK's Target Entertainment.

== Critical response ==
Extreme Tourist Afghanistan was critically acclaimed by both western and Afghan journalists for its portrayal of Afghans as real people and not just media stereotypes. In Australia there was extensive praise for the show from national and regional newspapers. The Sydney Morning Herald described the show as "highly recommended ". In the UK's Guardian newspaper the show was quoted in an article about the Taliban. In the USA, the show gained attention through the McClatchy newsgroup in their article Aussie's Afghan Travel Show a Tribute to Crazy Love. It's been Afghan own reaction to the show that has been, arguably, the most important. The BBC Persian Service has featured the show and interviewed Sabour Bradley following widespread positive discussion about the show amongst Dari and Persian speakers. Afghan Voice Radio has also interviewed Sabour Bradley.
