= Time of My Life (Australian TV series) =

2013 television series

- Genre: documentary
- Presented by: Kerri-Anne Kennerley
- Country of origin: Australia
- Original language: English
- No. of seasons: 1
- No. of episodes: 8

Production
- Running time: 60 minutes

Original release
- Network: 7TWO
- Release: 5 October – 23 November 2013

Time of My Life is an Australian 8-part documentary series aired on the Seven Network's digital channel 7TWO on 5 October 2013 until 23 November 2013 at Saturday 6.30pm.
