= It's a Lifestyle TV =

- Genre: lifestyle
- Presented by: Dominique Rizzo
- Country of origin: Australia
- Original language: English
- No. of seasons: 1

Production
- Running time: 22 minutes

Original release
- Network: Network Ten
- Release: 12 October 2013 – present

It’s a Lifestyle TV is an Australian lifestyle television show covering topics such as healthy cooking, fitness, sustainable living, health, fashion, and beauty. The show premiered on October 12, 2013, at 4:00 pm on Network Ten. It features a range of family-friendly recipes and provides tips related to health and well-being. The show is hosted by chef Dominique Rizzo and also features contributors including Dhav Naidu, who covers fashion and beauty, and Arabella Forge, a television presenter and food writer.

== Hosts ==
=== Dominique Rizzo ===
Dominique Rizzo is a chef and author who is passionate about improving the general well-being of individuals by improving their confidence in the kitchen. She accomplishes this by encouraging people to use innovative cooking techniques and by using fresh, seasonal, and local produce. Dominique’s life and work centers around her philosophy; "Through the sharing of food we share life and one is never lonely or hungry." She is also the author of the cook book My Taste of Sicily, which features a collection of family friendly traditional Sicilian recipes.

Rizzo has been a chef for nearly 20 years now and has been involved in a majority of catering and cooking projects throughout her career. She was a former head chef and partner of Mondo Organics restaurant, and has also been involved in cooking presentations and demonstrations, recipe writing, food styling, radio and Television work. Prior to It's A Lifestyle TV, Rizzo has appeared on the Australian cooking show Ready Steady Cook as one of the many chefs, and on numerous television shows as a special guest, such as the USA iconic morning show Today. Along with It's A Lifestyle TV, she has also been hosting another food show called Yes Chef.

=== Dhav Naidu ===
Dhav works across the media, both internationally and locally, from magazines to newspapers to television. Along with being a host for the show, he is a high renowned writer for The Weekly Review and he is known to be passionate about writing articles on lifestyle, beauty and fashion. Many of his recent articles include; Friends with Benefits, Time in the Sun, The Good Oil, and Grooming Shouldn't Take a Holiday.

On the show he is known for giving expert beauty advice such as, methods for applying the correct foundation, as well as fashion advice.

=== Arabella Forge ===
Forge is a television presenter, food writer and an Accredited Practising Dietitian (APD). She is known for writing the highly acclaimed cookbook Frugavore: How to Grow Your Own, Buy Local, Waste Nothing and Eat Well. Currently she also writes for several publications including The Melbourne Review, Goodfood.com.au and The South Melbourne Market. Along with co-hosting It's A Lifestyle, she also appears on Love to Share Food every Saturday at 4pm on Channel 10 where is speaks about gardening and vegetables.

As a co-host on the show, Forge is known to give advice about sustainable gardening, and provides the audience with many tips on how to make your favourite foods last longer. She also shares her knowledge about gardening in a few of the episodes, especially focusing on weeding, and always encourages others to buy local produce for the preparation of any home cooked meals.
