= Shane Delia's Spice Journey =

- Genre: Food, Travel, Cooking
- Presented by: Shane Delia
- Country of origin: Australia
- Original language: English
- No. of seasons: 4
- No. of episodes: 32

Production
- Executive producer: Sonja Armstrong
- Running time: 30 minutes

Original release
- Network: SBS One
- Release: 2 May 2013 – 11 January 2017

Shane Delia's Spice Journey is an Australian cooking and travel television show aired on SBS One. The original series aired from 2 May 2013 until 4 July 2013 and featured locations in Malta, Lebanon and Iran. A second series, Shane Delia's Spice Journey Turkey aired in 2014. The third series, Shane Delia's Moorish Spice Journey, was set in Morocco and Southern Spain and aired from 15 October 2015 until 17 December 2015. This series was revisited for two special episodes that aired in January 2017.
