= Live Healthy, Be Happy =

- Genre: Lifestyle
- Presented by: Geoff Huegill
- Country of origin: Australia
- Original language: English
- No. of seasons: 1

Production
- Running time: 30 minutes

Original release
- Network: Seven Network
- Release: 3 February 2013 – 2013

Live Healthy, Be Happy is an Australian lifestyle television series airs on the Seven Network on 3 February 2013. It's hosted by Geoff Huegill.
