= 999: What's Your Emergency? =

British television documentary

- Series 1 titlecard
- Genre: Documentary
- Narrated by: Hugo Speer (2012, 2016–); Julian Barratt (2013)
- Country of origin: United Kingdom
- Original language: English
- No. of series: 13
- No. of episodes: 71

Production
- Executive producers: Ed Coulthard (2012–13); Simon Ford (2012–13); Guy Davies (2013)
- Producers: Daniel Fromm (2012); Mark Jones (2012); Ally Roberts (2013)
- Running time: 60 minutes (inc. adverts)
- Production company: Blast!

Original release
- Network: Channel 4
- Release: 10 September 2012 – present

999: What's Your Emergency? is a British television documentary. Broadcast on Channel 4, the show provides insight into modern Britain through the eyes of the emergency services, using a mixture of fly-on-the-wall footage taken at incidents and retrospective interviews with the people and staff featured. The show is narrated by Hugo Speer, with the exception of Series 2 which was narrated by Julian Barratt.

Series 1 followed police officers, paramedics, firefighters, and call handlers in Blackpool, Lancashire. Series 2 followed paramedics throughout the UK. Series 3 followed police officers, paramedics, and call handlers in Cheshire. From Series 4 to Series 11, the show followed police officers, paramedics, call handlers, and occasionally firefighters in Wiltshire and Northamptonshire. Series 12 onwards, the programme has followed police officers and call handlers in South Yorkshire and Northamptonshire police.

== Episodes ==
All episode ratings are taken from the BARB website and include Channel 4 and Channel 4+1.

Series	Episodes	Start date	End date	Average UK viewers (millions)
1	10	10 September 2012	19 November 2012	2.80
2	6	7 October 2013	11 November 2013	1.98
3	14	4 July 2016	3 October 2016	2.00
4	6	24 July 2017	4 September 2017	1.79
5	7	30 October 2017	11 December 2017	
6	4	19 April 2018	10 May 2018	
7	4	24 July 2018	14 August 2018	
8	4	29 November 2018	22 April 2019	
9	4	3 June 2019	24 June 2019	
10	4	20 January 2020	10 February 2020	
11	3	5 October 2020	19 October 2020	
12	4	11 January 2021	1 February 2021	
13	5	8 June 2021	13 July 2021	
14		17 January 2022		

=== Series 1 (2012) ===
Episode	Broadcast Date	Episode Summary	Total viewers (millions)	Channel 4 weekly rank
1	10 September 2012	Drugs	2.90	3
2	17 September 2012	Children & Youth Crime	3.00	4
3	24 September 2012	Relationships & Domestic Abuse	2.95	2
4	8 October 2012	Payday & Bonfire Night	2.76	5
5	15 October 2012	Mental Health	2.96	3
6	22 October 2012	Women	2.91	5
7	29 October 2012	Alcohol	2.88	4
8	5 November 2012	Life or Death & Hoax Calls	3.12	4
9	12 November 2012	Visitors	2.56	5
10	19 November 2012	Highlights & Interviews	1.92	19

=== Series 2 (2013) ===
Episode	Broadcast Date	Episode Summary	Total viewers (millions)	Channel 4 weekly rank
1	7 October 2013	Transition to Adulthood	1.71	15
2	14 October 2013	Alcohol	1.78	16
3	21 October 2013	Mental Health	1.94	9
4	28 October 2013	Life or Death	1.94	8
5	4 November 2013	The Elderly	2.19	8
6	11 November 2013	Babies	2.33	6

=== Series 3 (2016-17) ===
Episode	Broadcast Date	Episode Summary	Total viewers (millions)	Channel 4 weekly rank
1	4 July 2016	Call Handlers	2.27	2
2	11 July 2016	Legal Highs	2.54	2
3	21 July 2016	Neighbours	2.23	3
4	28 July 2016	Mental Health	1.94	4
5	4 August 2016	Regular Callers & Repeat Offenders	2.20	2
6	11 August 2016	Immigrants & The Language Barrier	1.85	1
7	18 August 2016	Money	1.94	1
8	25 August 2016	Alcohol	2.11	3
9	1 September 2016	Teenagers & Youth Crime	2.05	3
10	5 September 2016	Violent Crime	1.72	7
11	19 September 2016	Roads Policing	1.88	7
12	26 September 2016	Relationships & Domestic Abuse	1.63	9
13	3 October 2016	Death	1.71	10
14	27 February 2017	Custody	1.39	16

=== Series 4 (2017) ===
Episode	Broadcast Date	Episode Summary	Total viewers (millions)	Channel 4 weekly rank
1	24 July 2017	Immigrants & Hate Crime	1.83	5
2	31 July 2017	Young Men	2.22	5
3	7 August 2017	Drugs	1.81	5
4	14 August 2017	Vigilante Justice	1.78	7
5	28 August 2017	Burglary	2.19	5
6	4 September 2017	Children & Parenting	2.40	7

=== Series 5 (2017) ===
Episode	Broadcast Date	Episode Summary	Total viewers (millions)	Channel 4 weekly rank
1	30 October 2017	Sex Offences		
2	6 November 2017	Squaddies		
3	13 November 2017	Homelessness		
4	20 November 2017	Mental Health		
5	27 November 2017	The Elderly		
6	4 December 2017	Workplace Stress		
7	11 December 2017	Teenagers & Youth Crime		

=== Series 6 (2018) ===
Episode	Broadcast Date	Episode Summary	Total viewers (millions)	Channel 4 weekly rank
1	19 April 2018	Dangerous Driving		
2	26 April 2018	Mother & Son Relationships		
3	3 May 2018	Loneliness		
4	10 May 2018	Cannabis		

=== Series 7 (2018) ===
Episode	Broadcast Date	Episode Summary	Total viewers (millions)	Channel 4 weekly rank
1	24 July 2018	Accidents & Injuries		
2	31 July 2018	Ambulance Response Times		
3	7 August 2018	Emergency & Non-emergency Calls		
4	14 August 2018	Poverty		

=== Series 8 (2018) ===
Episode	Broadcast Date	Episode Summary	Total viewers (millions)	Channel 4 weekly rank
1	20 November 2018	Violent Crime		
2	27 November 2018	Learning Disabilities		
3	4 December 2018	Criminal Families		
4	22 April 2019	Knife Crime & Murder		

=== Series 9 (2019) ===
Episode	Broadcast Date	Episode Summary	Total viewers (millions)	Channel 4 weekly rank
1	3 June 2019	Relationships & Domestic Abuse		
2	10 June 2019	Increased Demand		
3	17 June 2019	Officer Safety		
4	24 June 2019	Knife Crime		

=== Series 10 (2020) ===
Episode	Broadcast Date	Episode Summary	Total viewers (millions)	Channel 4 weekly rank
1	20 January 2020	Roads Policing		
2	27 January 2020	Young Men & Fathers		
3	3 February 2020	Hate Crime		
4	10 February 2020	Women		

=== Series 11 (2020) ===
Episode	Broadcast Date	Episode Summary	Total viewers (millions)	Channel 4 weekly rank
1	5 October 2020	High Streets & Night-time Economy		
2	12 October 2020	Burglary & Theft		
3	19 October 2020	Violent Crime & Youth Crime		

=== Series 12 (2021) ===
Episode	Broadcast Date	Episode Summary	Total viewers (millions)	Channel 4 weekly rank
1	11 January 2021	Fear of Crime		
2	18 January 2021	Sex Offences		
3	25 January 2021	Violent Crime & Youth Crime		
4	1 February 2021	Coronavirus		

=== Series 13 (2021) ===
Episode	Broadcast Date	Episode Summary	Total viewers (millions)	Channel 4 weekly rank
1	8 June 2021	Revenge & Vigilante Justice		
2	15 June 2021	Time Wasters & the Vulnerable		
3	22 June 2021	Alcohol & House Parties		
4	29 June 2021	Children & Parenting		
5	13 July 2021	Housing		

=== Series 14 (2022) ===
Episode	Broadcast Date	Episode Summary	Total viewers (millions)	Channel 4 weekly rank
1	17 January 2022	The Night Shift		
2	24 January 2022	Drunk Women		
3	31 January 2022	Custody		

== Controversies ==
After Series 1 of the show, residents and councillors from Blackpool expressed their dismay at how their town was portrayed to potential visitors, and were concerned the gritty reality may discourage tourism. In particular, the leader of Blackpool council Simon Blackburn voiced his concerns after watching the show. On 26 July 2013, it was confirmed that Crackit Productions and the BBC were about to commission "Holiday Hospital 999", another show portraying Blackpool, but these plans were shelved. After the effect of "999: What's Your Emergency?" on the town's popularity with tourists, the Blackpool Gazette called this a "bullet dodged".

PC Claire van Deurs Goss was disciplined by Lancashire Constabulary after being shown applying lip gloss at the wheel of a police vehicle in Series 1 Episode 6, an action which prompted over 50 complaints to the force.

Despite praising the overall performance of his staff, Wiltshire Police Chief Constable Kier Pritchard admitted that the expletives used by some of the Wiltshire police officers featured in the show fell below the standards expected of them.
