= Sabour Bradley =

Australian filmmaker, writer and broadcaster

Sabour Bradley is an Australian filmmaker, writer and broadcaster. He is known for his documentary series Extreme Tourist Afghanistan on National Geographic, and Head First on the ABC, as well as his writing and producing roles on narrative fiction projects such as Represent, and the children's television series Bobo & Kipi.

Bradley was born and raised near Bunbury, Western Australia, and educated at the Victorian College of the Arts. His career began in journalism and his early documentaries were influenced by this and the immersive, experiential styles of Nick Broomfield and Morgan Spurlock. He works with Al Jazeera's documentary series, 101 East.
