= Head First (TV series) =

- Genre: Documentary
- Directed by: Colin Thrupp, Sabour Bradley, Aaron Smith
- Presented by: Sabour Bradley
- Country of origin: Australia
- Original language: English
- No. of seasons: 2
- No. of episodes: 10

Production
- Executive producers: John Molloy, Sabour Bradley
- Cinematography: Colin Thrupp, Sieh McHawala, Scott Walker, Tim Small
- Editor: Katie Flaxman
- Running time: 45 minutes
- Production companies: Mushroom Pictures, Silver Suit Media, Tin Roof Pictures

Original release
- Network: ABC2
- Release: 1 May 2013 – 13 August 2014

Head First is an Australian documentary television series which premiered on ABC2 from 1 May 2013. It is presented by Sabour Bradley. The series focuses on controversial topics in society such as romance scams, sex tapes, the Northern Territory intervention, performance-enhancing drugs, transgender issues, stem cell tourism, porn addiction, and rhino poaching in Africa.

The second season of the show aired on ABC1 from 16 July 2014. The series was a critical success. Ratings for the fourth episode of season 1 were the highest overnight figures for an ABC2-commissioned show ever. Reruns air on ABC2, ABC1 and ABC iview.
