= My Kitchen Rules series 4 =

My Kitchen Rules
- Series 4
- No. of episodes: 46

Release
- Original network: Seven Network
- Original release: 28 January – 28 April 2013

Series chronology
- ← Previous; Series 3 (2012) Next → Series 5 (2014)

The fourth series of the Australian competitive cooking game show My Kitchen Rules commenced on 28 January 2013 and concluded on 28 April 2013 on Seven Network.

== Format Changes ==
- Gatecrasher Round: Three additional "gatecrasher" teams entered the show after the instant restaurant round of Group 2. They competed against the bottom three teams from the remaining 10, in a third round of instant restaurants .
- Comeback Kitchen: A number of teams were eliminated on more than one occasion. After their initial elimination, they were brought back through a "Comeback Kitchen" which saw teams compete for one remaining spot in the finals. Losing teams were "re-eliminated" from the competition. This challenge saw eliminated teams cooking meals to order for judge, Colin Fassnidge's restaurant 4Fourteen. Patrons paid for what they thought the meals were worth and the winning or losing teams advanced or were re-eliminated.
- Blind Tastings: For all Sudden Death Cook-Offs guest judges no longer knew who cooked which dish.

== Teams ==
For this series, Queensland, South Australia, and Tasmania each commenced with two teams, while New South Wales, Victoria and Western Australia each had three teams (two original teams and one "gatecrasher" team) A team's Group 1, 2 or gatecrasher status was only of significance in the Instant restaurant rounds.

State		Group	Members	Relationship	Status
Queensland	QLD	2	Dan & Steph Mulheron	Married	Winners 28 April (Grand Final)
Queensland	QLD	1	Jake & Elle Harrison	Brother and Sister	Runners-up 28 April (Grand Final)
Tasmania	TAS	1	Mick & Matt Newell	Father and Son	Re-eliminated 24 April (Semifinal 2; First Elimination 11 March: Top 11)
New South Wales	NSW	2	Luke Hines & Scott Gooding	Personal Trainers	Eliminated 23 April (Semifinal 1)
Victoria	VIC	2	Sam Newton & Chris Cavanagh	Cousins	Eliminated 22 April (Final 5)
New South Wales	NSW	G	Ashlee Pham & Sophia Pou	Friends	Re-eliminated 21 April (Comeback Kitchen #3; First Elimination 16 April: Top 6)
Victoria	VIC	G	Angela Kennedy & Melina Bagnato	Real Housewives	Re-eliminated 21 April (Comeback Kitchen #3; First Elimination 20 March: Top 9)
Victoria	VIC	1	Kerrie & Craig Palmer	Childhood Sweethearts	Re-eliminated 21 April (Comeback Kitchen #3; First Elimination 17 April: Top 6)
South Australia	SA	2	Jenna Jaede & Joanna Stirn	Domestic Goddesses	Re-eliminated 14 April (Comeback Kitchen #2; First Elimination 10 April: Top 7)
Western Australia	WA	G	Kieran Reidy & Nastassia Jorre De St Jorre	Food Nerds	Re-eliminated 7 April (Comeback Kitchen #1; First Elimination 5 March: Top 12)
Tasmania	TAS	2	Ali Hawkins & Samuel Berechree	Mates	Re-eliminated 7 April (Comeback Kitchen #1; First Elimination 14 March: Top 10)
Western Australia	WA	1	Josh Maldenis & Andi Thomas	Dating Hipsters	Eliminated 3 April (Top 8)

== Elimination history ==
Teams' Competition Progress
Round:	Instant Restaurant			Top 12	Top 11	Top 10	Top 9	Top 8	Comeback Kitchen #1		Top 7	Comeback Kitchen #2		Top 6: Finals Decider		Comeback Kitchen #3		Final 5	Semifinals		Grand Final
Round:	1	2	3	Top 12	Top 11	Top 10	Top 9	Top 8	Comeback Kitchen #1		Top 7	Comeback Kitchen #2		FT	FD	Comeback Kitchen #3		Final 5	Semifinals		Grand Final
Team	Progress																				
Dan & Steph	—N/a	5th^{1} (58)	3rd (52)	HQ; Safe	HQ; Safe	HQ; Safe	HQ; Safe	HQ; Safe	—N/a		RC; Safe	—N/a		Safe	Safe	—N/a		2nd Safe	1st (46)	—N/a	Winners (54)
Jake & Elle	4th (65)	—N/a	—N/a	HQ; Safe	People's; Choice	HQ; Safe	SD (50)	People's; Choice	—N/a		RC; Safe	—N/a		Safe	Safe	—N/a		1st Safe	—N/a	1st (51)	Runners-up (52)
Mick & Matt	1st (80)	—N/a	—N/a	Immune	SD (31)	Eliminated (Episode 24)			Safe	Safe	—N/a	Safe	Safe	—N/a		Safe	Win	SD (49)	—N/a	2nd (44)	Re-eliminated (Episode 45)
Luke & Scott	—N/a	1st (90)	—N/a	Immune	HQ; Safe	HQ; Safe	HQ; Safe	HQ; Safe	—N/a		RC; Safe	—N/a		Win	SD 2 (38)	—N/a		3rd Safe	2nd (41)	Eliminated (Episode 44)	
Sam & Chris	—N/a	3rd (64)	—N/a	SD (40)	HQ; Safe	HQ; Safe	HQ; Safe	HQ; Safe	—N/a		RC; Safe	—N/a		Safe	SD 1 (44)	—N/a		SD (44)	Eliminated (Episode 43)		
Ashlee & Sophia	—N/a	—N/a	2nd (64)	HQ; Safe	HQ; Safe	HQ; Safe	People's; Choice	SD (39)	—N/a		People's; Choice	—N/a		Win	SD 1 (43)	Safe	Lose	Re-eliminated (Episode 42)			
Angela & Melina	—N/a	—N/a	4th (50)	People's; Choice	HQ; Safe	SD (34)	SD (37)	Eliminated (Episode 30)	Safe	Safe	—N/a	Safe	Safe	—N/a		Safe	Lose	Re-eliminated (Episode 42)			
Kerrie & Craig	2nd (72)	—N/a	—N/a	HQ; Safe	Voted; Safe	HQ; Safe	HQ; Safe	People's; Choice	—N/a		SD (35)	—N/a		Safe	SD 2 (37)	Lose	Re-eliminated (Episode 42)				
Jenna & Joanna	—N/a	2nd (87)	—N/a	HQ; Safe	SD (42)	People's; Choice	HQ; Safe	HQ; Safe	—N/a		SD (34)	Safe	Lose	Re-eliminated (Episode 38)							
Kieran & Nastassia	—N/a	—N/a	5th (48)	SD (27)	Eliminated (Episode 21)				Safe	Lose	Re-eliminated (Episode 34)										
Ali & Samuel	—N/a	4th^{1} (63)	1st (88)	Immune	HQ; Safe	SD (26)	Eliminated (Episode 27)		Lose	Re-eliminated (Episode 34)											
Josh & Andi	3rd (68)	—N/a	—N/a	HQ; Safe	HQ; Safe	HQ; Safe	HQ; Safe	SD (38)	Eliminated (Episode 33)												

Cell Descriptions
Immune	Team was immuned and didn't have to cook in the challenge.
	Team was the top scorer or won People's Choice
	Team had to cook another round of Instant Restaurant
Safe	Team became safe from elimination after winning/passing a challenge. HQ: Kitchen Headquarter Challenge (R.Cook-off or Showdown); RC: Rapid Cook-off (Top 7)
SD	Team won the Sudden Death cook-off is safe from elimination.
SD	Team was eliminated after losing the Sudden Death cook-off or round.
—N/a	Results do not apply as the team was not allocated to this challenge or round.

Notes

^1 – After Lisa & Candice were eliminated, the total tally of the instant restaurant scores were shown and the three lowest scorers out of the remaining ten teams were Ali & Samuel, Lisa & Stefano and Dan & Steph. They competed in another instant restaurant round with the three gatecrasher teams. These gatecrasher teams were introduced after the last instant restaurant of the second group (Jenna & Joanna).
^2 – The winners of the People's Choice were given the pleasure of choosing one other team to be safe with them, through to the next round.
^3 – Finishing first on the instant restaurant leaderboards, these three teams were exempt from this challenge and safe from elimination.
^4 – The 'Comeback Kitchen' rounds were separate challenges from the main competition and occurred alongside the main stream. Only eliminated teams between the Top 12 and Top 6 (except Josh and Andi for personal reasons) participated in the Comeback Kitchen.

== Competition Details ==
=== Instant Restaurant Round ===
==== Round 1 ====
- Episodes 1 to 6
- Airdate – 28 January to 6 February
- Description – The first of the two instant restaurant groups are introduced into the competition in Round 1. The lowest scoring team at the end of this round is eliminated.

Instant Restaurant Summary
Group 1
Team and Episode Details		Guest Scores						Pete's Scores			Manu's Scores			Total (out of 110)	Rank	Result
Team and Episode Details		K&C	M&M	J&A	J&B	J&E	L&S	Entrée	Main	Dessert	Entrée	Main	Dessert	Total (out of 110)	Rank	Result
VIC	Kerrie & Craig	—	7	7	5	7	7	8	7	4	7	8	5	72	2nd	Safe
Ep 1	28 January	Circa 75														Safe
Dishes	Entrée	Roasted Vegetable Tarte Tatin with Goats Curd and Roquette & Pear Salad														Safe
Dishes	Main	Game Wallaby with Basil Risotto and Caramelised Beetroot														Safe
Dishes	Dessert	Chocolate Jaffa Cake with Chocolate Candied Orange														Safe
TAS	Mick & Matt	7	—	6	6	7	5	8	10	9	4	9	9	80	1st	Safe
Ep 2	29 January	Anchors Away														Safe
Dishes	Entrée	Abalone Patty with Salsa and Zesty Herb Yoghurt														Safe
Dishes	Main	Salmon with Smoked Eel Potato Brandade and Lemon Beurre Blanc														Safe
Dishes	Dessert	Apple and Berry Coconut Crumble with Custard														Safe
WA	Josh & Andi	7	5	—	6	5	6	9	4	7	8	3	8	68	3rd	Safe
Ep 3	30 January	Black Champagne														Safe
Dishes	Entrée	Dukkah Crusted Lamb with Radish Tzatziki														Safe
Dishes	Main	Moroccan Chicken with Harissa and Vegetable Couscous														Safe
Dishes	Dessert	Chocolate Fondant with Coffee Crème Anglaise														Safe
NSW	Jessie & Biswa	3	3	3	—	3	3	6	6	1	5	6	2	41	6th	Eliminated
Ep 4	4 February	Taza														Eliminated
Dishes	Entrée	Pani Puri, Lamb Samosa and Yoghurt Lassi														Eliminated
Dishes	Main	Goat Sindhi Biryani														Eliminated
Dishes	Dessert	Gulab Jamun														Eliminated
QLD	Jake & Elle	5	5	5	1	—	5	8	5	9	8	5	9	65	4th	Safe
Ep 5	5 February	Costa Del Sol														Safe
Dishes	Entrée	Rabbit, Pancetta and Thyme Ravioli with Truffle Cream Sauce and Walnuts														Safe
Dishes	Main	T-Bone Steak with Mushroom Ragu, Silverbeet, Radicchio and Potato & Parsnip Gratin														Safe
Dishes	Dessert	Orange and Basil Syrup Cake with Basil Ice Cream and Toffee Shard														Safe
SA	Lisa & Stefano	4	5	4	1	4	—	2	6	9	3	5	9	52	5th	Through to Round 3
Ep 6	6 February	Carnivale														Through to Round 3
Dishes	Entrée	White Bean and Eggplant Purée with Rosemary Flat Bread														Through to Round 3
Dishes	Main	Duck Breast in White Wine, Cinnamon and Sage on Polenta with Roast Potatoes and Artichokes														Through to Round 3
Dishes	Dessert	Coconut Meringue with Passionfruit Curd and Rum Cream														Through to Round 3

==== Round 2 ====
- Episodes 7 to 12
- Airdate – 7 to 18 February
- Description – The second of the two instant restaurant groups are introduced into the competition in Round 2. The same rules from the previous round apply and the lowest scoring team is eliminated.

Instant Restaurant Summary
Group 2
Team and Episode Details		Guest Scores						Pete's Scores			Manu's Scores			Total (out of 110)	Rank	Result
Team and Episode Details		S&C	L&C	A&S	L&S	D&S	J&J	Entrée	Main	Dessert	Entrée	Main	Dessert	Total (out of 110)	Rank	Result
VIC	Sam & Chris	—	6	6	6	5	5	5	4	8	5	5	9	64	3rd	Safe
Ep 7	7 February	Food Alley														Safe
Dishes	Entrée	Spinach and Ricotta Runny Egg Ravioli														Safe
Dishes	Main	Lamb Roulade with Pea and Mint Purée														Safe
Dishes	Dessert	Coconut Crème Caramel with Almond Praline														Safe
WA	Lisa & Candice	5	—	6	6	4	6	9	3	3	8	3	4	57	6th	Eliminated
Ep 8	11 February	D'Lish														Eliminated
Dishes	Entrée	Seafood Casserole of Prawns, Mussels, Dhufish and Scallops with Chorizo Flakes														Eliminated
Dishes	Main	Pork with Pancetta Crackle, Vegetable Medley, Onion Purée, Brandy Jus and Cider Jelly Shot														Eliminated
Dishes	Dessert	Pumpkin Pie with Toffee Cashews and Banana Cream														Eliminated
TAS	Ali & Samuel	7	3	—	7	6	7	2	9	6	3	8	5	63	4th	Through to Round 3
Ep 9	12 February	Wonderland														Through to Round 3
Dishes	Entrée	Thai Beef Curry Strips with a Mai Tai Granita														Through to Round 3
Dishes	Main	Squid Hood Stuffed with Pork with Asian Greens and Sweet Chilli Sauce														Through to Round 3
Dishes	Dessert	Thai-Rifle with Coconut Granita														Through to Round 3
NSW	Luke & Scott	8	8	8	—	9	8	10	5	10	10	4	10	90	1st	Safe
Ep 10	13 February	Made in Bondi														Safe
Dishes	Entrée	Zesty Prawn Salad														Safe
Dishes	Main	Twice Cooked Spatchcock with Coconut Kale Salad and Roasted Cherry Tomatoes														Safe
Dishes	Dessert	Spelt, Berry and Macaroon Tart with Crème Anglaise														Safe
QLD	Dan & Steph	5	4	7	6	—	6	9	2	3	9	3	4	58	5th	Through to Round 3
Ep 11	14 February	Decadence														Through to Round 3
Dishes	Entrée	Confit Salmon with Green Pea Salad														Through to Round 3
Dishes	Main	Cherry Cola Braised Pork with White Bean Mash and Baby Carrots														Through to Round 3
Dishes	Dessert	Chocolate Brownie with Cookie Dough Ice Cream and Salted Caramel Sauce														Through to Round 3
SA	Jenna & Joanna	9	4	9	8	7	—	10	8	9	10	6	7	87	2nd	Safe
Ep 12	18 February	J'Adore Pink														Safe
Dishes	Entrée	Sicilian Stuffed and Rolled Garfish with Tomato & White Wine Sauce														Safe
Dishes	Main	Homemade Italian Sausage with Horseradish Mash and Green Apple Salad														Safe
Dishes	Dessert	Pistachio and Strawberry Mousse with a Dacquoise Base														Safe

==== Round 3 (Gatecrasher Round) ====
- Episodes 13 to 18
- Airdate – 19 to 27 February
- Description – In the third round of instant restaurants, the three lowest scoring safe teams in the first two groups combined, into another instant restaurant round. From here, three newly introduced 'gatecrasher' teams also joined the round. As per the first two rounds, the same format of scoring is repeated and the lowest scoring team is eliminated.

Instant Restaurant Summary
Group 3
Team and Episode Details		Guest Scores						Pete's Scores			Manu's Scores			Total (out of 110)	Rank	Result
Team and Episode Details		A&M	D&S	K&N	A&S	L&S	A&S	Entrée	Main	Dessert	Entrée	Main	Dessert	Total (out of 110)	Rank	Result
VIC	Angela & Melina	—	2	6	4	1	5	6	7	3	5	8	3	50	4th	Safe
Ep 13	19 February	La Bella Mama														Safe
Dishes	Entrée	Ricotta Stuffed Zucchini Flowers and Melanzane Ripiene														Safe
Dishes	Main	Red Wine Beef Cheeks with Radicchio and Roast Garlic Mash														Safe
Dishes	Dessert	Mango and Passionfruit Summer Delight														Safe
QLD	Dan & Steph	3	—	5	7	4	3	4	1	8	5	3	9	52	3rd	Safe
Ep 14	20 February	Decadence														Safe
Dishes	Entrée	Warm Duck Sausage with Beetroot Salad														Safe
Dishes	Main	Pork Knuckle with Blue Cheese Potato Gratin and Red Cabbage														Safe
Dishes	Dessert	Orange Tian with Toasted Almonds														Safe
WA	Kieran & Nastassia	2	5	—	4	1	6	3	6	8	1	7	5	48	5th	Safe
Ep 15	21 February	The Asylum														Safe
Dishes	Entrée	Walnut and Spinach Ravioli with Mascarpone and Basil														Safe
Dishes	Main	Trout Baked in Salt Dough with Kipfler Potatoes and Watercress & Lemon Cream Sauce														Safe
Dishes	Dessert	Champagne Poached Pears with Honey Cinnamon Ice Cream and Pistachio Biscuits														Safe
TAS	Ali & Samuel	7	8	7	—	4	7	8	10	10	9	9	9	88	1st	Safe
Ep 16	25 February	Wonderland														Safe
Dishes	Entrée	Pink Ling and Abalone Ceviche														Safe
Dishes	Main	Beef Fillet with Cacao and Chilli Harissa and Broad Bean Salad														Safe
Dishes	Dessert	Churros with Chocolate and Avocado Dipping Sauce														Safe
SA	Lisa & Stefano	2	3	2	3	—	3	5	6	1	6	5	2	38	6th	Eliminated
Ep 17	26 February	Carnivale														Eliminated
Dishes	Entrée	Mussels with Leeks, Butter Sauce and Almonds														Eliminated
Dishes	Main	Ragù di Coniglio with Herb Risotto														Eliminated
Dishes	Dessert	Chocolate Chip Cookies with Salted Peanut Semifreddo and Chocolate Sauce														Eliminated
NSW	Ashlee & Sophia	4	5	3	4	1	—	6	10	8	7	9	7	64	2nd	Safe
Ep 18	27 February	The Factory														Safe
Dishes	Entrée	Poached Chicken Salad with Sweet and Sour Dressing														Safe
Dishes	Main	Shrimp and Pork Vietnamese Pancakes														Safe
Dishes	Dessert	Lime Crème Brûlée														Safe

=== Top 12 ===
==== People's Choice Challenge: Annual Block Party ====
- Episode 19
- Airdate – 28 February 2013
- Location – Kings Cross, Sydney, NSW
- Description – Teams were challenged to cook in the kitchens of small compact apartments. Five teams chose to cook a main, and four teams cooked a dessert. Their meals were served to 50 guests for the annual block party. Guests voted for their favourite dish and the team with the most votes won the People's Choice.

Teams' performances on the first People's Choice Challenge
Team		Dish	Result
TAS	Ali & Samuel	—N/a	Immunity^{2}
NSW	Luke & Scott	—N/a	Immunity^{2}
TAS	Mick & Matt	—N/a	Immunity^{2}
VIC	Angela & Melina	Baharat Beef with Sweet Potato Mash and Mint Yoghurt Sauce	People's Choice
NSW	Ashlee & Sophia	Chocolate Berry Tartlets	Through to Rapid Cook-off
QLD	Dan & Steph	Pavlova with Lemon Curd and Raspberry Jelly	Through to Rapid Cook-off
QLD	Jake & Elle	Crusted Pear with Berry Compote	Through to Rapid Cook-off
SA	Jenna & Joanna	Croquembouche	Through to Rapid Cook-off
WA	Josh & Andi	Salmon with Salsa Verde and Asparagus	Through to Rapid Cook-off
VIC	Kerrie & Craig	Lamb on Quinoa Fattoush with Flatbread	Through to Rapid Cook-off
VIC	Sam & Chris	Pasta with Chorizo and Pesto	Through to Rapid Cook-off
WA	Kieran & Nastassia	Kangaroo with Bordelaise Sauce	Through to Sudden Death

Note

- ^2 – Finishing first on the instant restaurant leaderboards, Mick & Matt, Luke & Scott, and Ali & Samuel were granted immunity status and did not participate on the round.

==== Rapid Cook-off: Herb Challenge ====
- Episode 20
- Airdate – 4 March 2013
- Description – During the rapid cook-off, teams were challenged to create a dish in 30 minutes using one of four types of herb namely: basil, coriander, mint, and thyme. At the 15 minute mark, the clock was unexpectedly stopped and a twist was thrown in. For the remaining 15 minutes, only one team member was allowed to cook. All teams were reviewed by the judges, with the top 3 teams safe from elimination and the bottom 4 competing in a following showdown. Spice was the main component of the second showdown. Once again, teams were reviewed and the weakest headed to the sudden death cook-off to face Kieran and Nastassia.

Teams' performances on the first rapid cook-off
Team		Theme	Dish	Result
Rapid Cook Off 1
NSW	Ashlee & Sophia	Basil	Lemon and Basil Cured Beef with Asian Salad	Safe
QLD	Dan & Steph	Coriander	Salt and Pepper Chicken with Coriander Salad	Safe
SA	Jenna & Joanna	Mint	Salmon with Carrot and Beetroot Salad and Mint Aioli	Safe
QLD	Jake & Elle	Thyme	Thyme Lamb Kofta with Halloumi	Through to Showdown
WA	Josh & Andi	Coriander	Deconstructed Chicken and Coriander Taco	Through to Showdown
VIC	Kerrie & Craig	Basil	Basil Sardines with Green Couscous	Through to Showdown
VIC	Sam & Chris	Mint	Spiced Chicken with Mint Noodle Salad	Through to Showdown

Teams' performances in the Showdown
Team		Dish	Result
Showdown
QLD	Jake & Elle	Turmeric and Chili Risotto with Prawns	Safe
WA	Josh & Andi	Spiced Lamb with Cauliflower Two Ways	Safe
VIC	Kerrie & Craig	Saffron Poached Pears with Creamed Cardamom Rice	Safe
VIC	Sam & Chris	Butter Chicken with Spiced Flatbread and Rice	Through to Sudden Death

==== Sudden Death ====
- Episode 21
- Airdate – 5 March 2013
- Description – Two teams, VIC's Sam and Chris and WA's Kieran and Nastassia battle it out, producing a three course meal for Pete and Manu as well as four guest judges. The teams are judged and scored, with the weakest team eliminated from the competition. This is the first sudden death in MKR to introduce Blind Tastings, where the judges will not know who cooked which dish.

Sudden Death cook-off results
Team		Judge's scores						Total (out of 60)	Result
Team		Karen	Guy	Liz	Colin	Pete	Manu	Total (out of 60)	Result
VIC	Sam & Chris	6	7	7	6	7	7	40	Safe
Dishes	Entree	Gnocchi with Wild Mushroom and Truffle Oil							Safe
Dishes	Main	Lamb with Carrot Purée and Red Wine Jus							Safe
Dishes	Dessert	Chocolate Tart with Cinnamon Ice Cream							Safe
WA	Kieran & Nastassia	4	4	5	3	6	5	27	Eliminated^{C}
Dishes	Entree	Scallops on Black Pudding with Pancetta							Eliminated^{C}
Dishes	Main	Quail with Leeks, Wild Mushrooms and Juniper Sauce							Eliminated^{C}
Dishes	Dessert	White Chocolate and Raspberry Mini Cakes with Strawberry and Balsamic Ice Cream							Eliminated^{C}

Note

- ^C – After being eliminated, Kieran and Nastassia headed to the Comeback Kitchen to compete for a place in the finals

=== Top 11 ===
==== People's Choice Challenge: Market Food ====
- Episode 22
- Airdate – 6 March 2013
- Location – Sydney Markets, Flemington, NSW
- Description – Teams were given 90 minutes to buy their produce, cook and set up their stalls ready to sell their meals to the public. They were to set their own pricings and food offers. The team who made the most money won the People's Choice, whilst Pete and Manu chose the weakest team. The winners of the People's Choice were not only safe from elimination themselves, but were able to choose one other team to be safe with them.

Teams' performances on the second People's Choice Challenge
Team		Dish	Result
QLD	Jake & Elle	Vietnamese Baguettes	People's Choice
VIC	Kerrie & Craig	Gözleme	Safe by selection
VIC	Sam & Chris	Pancakes Three Ways	Through to Rapid Cook-off
QLD	Dan & Steph	Rice Paper Rolls and Mango Salad	Through to Rapid Cook-off
WA	Josh & Andi	Spiced Meatballs with Couscous	Through to Rapid Cook-off
TAS	Ali & Samuel	Spiced Chicken with Pumpkin Rösti	Through to Rapid Cook-off
NSW	Ashlee & Sophia	Caramelised Pork with Vermicelli Noodles and Pickled Carrots	Through to Rapid Cook-off
NSW	Luke & Scott	Sweetcorn and Pea Fritters with Bacon	Through to Rapid Cook-off
VIC	Angela & Melina	Sticky Chicken Popcorn with Chips	Through to Rapid Cook-off
TAS	Mick & Matt	Cinnamon Chicken Skewers with Couscous	Through to Rapid Cook-off
SA	Jenna & Joanna	Hot Cakes with Caramelised Banana, Mango and Ricotta	Through to Sudden Death

==== Rapid Cook-off: Breakfast Challenge ====
- Episode 23
- Airdate – 7 March 2013
- Description – In this rapid cook-off, teams were to create a breakfast dish using a set main ingredient namely: bacon, fruit, mushrooms or tomato. Adding a further twist, after getting ingredients ready from the store room, teams were to cook their breakfasts transferring to someone else's prepared ingredients. All dishes are judged and the bottom 4 teams competed in a showdown to create the best chicken dish.

Teams' performances on the second rapid cook-off
Team		Theme	Dish	Result
Rapid Cook Off 2
TAS	Ali & Samuel	Bacon	Bacon Huevos rancheros with Bloody Mary Salsa	Safe
WA	Josh & Andi	Tomato	Roasted Tomato Middle Eastern Breakfast	Safe
NSW	Luke & Scott	Bacon	Bacon and Egg Roll (Bondi Style)	Safe
VIC	Sam & Chris	Tomato	Tomato Salsa with Baked Eggs and Grilled Asparagus	Safe
VIC	Angela & Melina	Mushroom	Stuffed Mushroom and Egg Stack	Through to Showdown
NSW	Ashlee & Sophia	Fruit	Blueberry Pancakes with Date and Banana Butter	Through to Showdown
QLD	Dan & Steph	Fruit	Banana and Cinnamon Pide with Yoghurt and Berry Compote	Through to Showdown
TAS	Mick & Matt	Mushroom	Mushrooms with Eggs Two Ways	Through to Showdown

Teams' performances in the Showdown
Team		Dish	Result
Showdown
VIC	Angela & Melina	Lemon and Herb Stuffed Chicken with Beetroot Leaves, Fried Eggplant, Capsicum and Potato	Safe
NSW	Ashlee & Sophia	Hainan Chicken with Three Sauces	Safe
QLD	Dan & Steph	Jerk Chicken with Coconut Rice and Pineapple Salsa	Safe
TAS	Mick & Matt	Chicken Pesto Pasta with Stuffed Tomatoes	Through to Sudden Death

==== Sudden Death ====
- Episode 24
- Airdate – 11 March 2013
- Description – Sudden death cook-off between the 'Cupcakes' Jenna and Joanna and father-son duo, Mick and Matt.

Sudden Death
Team		Judge's scores						Total (out of 60)	Result
Team		Karen	Guy	Liz	Colin	Pete	Manu	Total (out of 60)	Result
SA	Jenna & Joanna	7	7	7	7	7	7	42	Safe
Dishes	Entree	Squid with Fennel and Herb Salad							Safe
Dishes	Main	Braised Beef Ribs, Chickpea Puree and Broccolini							Safe
Dishes	Dessert	Mango Mousse with Toffee-Dipped Macadamias							Safe
TAS	Mick & Matt	5	5	5	4	6	6	31	Eliminated^{C}
Dishes	Entree	Hot and Spicy Prawns with Coconut Lime Rice							Eliminated^{C}
Dishes	Main	Grilled Trevalla with Lentils and Raita							Eliminated^{C}
Dishes	Dessert	Cappuccino Cheesecake with Toasted Meringue							Eliminated^{C}

Note

- ^C – After being eliminated, Mick and Matt headed to the Comeback Kitchen to compete for a place in the finals

=== Top 10 ===
==== People's Choice Challenge: Kids' Lunch (Children's Choice) ====
- Episode 25
- Airdate – 12 March 2013
- Location – Taronga Zoo, Sydney, NSW
- Description – The teams were required to make a healthy and delicious lunch for two hundred kids. The team with the most votes won the children's choice, while the team with the least impressive meal, judged by Pete and Manu, went straight to the Sudden Death.

Teams' performances on the third People's Choice Challenge
Team		Dish	Result
SA	Jenna & Joanna	Chicken Drumsticks with Corn on the Cob	Children's Choice
VIC	Angela & Melina	Funky Monkey Muffin with Sea Salt Popcorn	Through to Rapid Cook-off
NSW	Ashlee & Sophia	Meatball Sub with Tomato and Herb Salad	Through to Rapid Cook-off
QLD	Dan & Steph	Zoo-shi: Sushi with Miso Butter Corn	Through to Rapid Cook-off
QLD	Jake & Elle	Chicken and Cheese Taquitos with Mexican Rice and Guacamole	Through to Rapid Cook-off
WA	Josh & Andi	Baboon Beef Burgers with Zucchini Fries	Through to Rapid Cook-off
VIC	Kerrie & Craig	Hungry Caterpillar: Lettuce Herb Balls with Lamb Skewers and Tzatziki	Through to Rapid Cook-off
NSW	Luke & Scott	Spelt Pasta Bolognese with Broccoli and Pea Smash	Through to Rapid Cook-off
VIC	Sam & Chris	Pork and Vegetable Sausage Rolls with Oven-Baked Chips and Salad	Through to Rapid Cook-off
TAS	Ali & Samuel	Chicken Skewers with Stir-Fried Vegetables	Through to Sudden Death

==== Rapid Cook-off: Four-course Meal Challenge ====
- Episode 26
- Airdate – 13 March 2013
- Description – The eight teams were split into two groups of four: white group and black group. Each group had to cook a combined four-course meal in 30 minutes. This challenge involved teamwork within the group as the meal was judged as a whole. The weaker group headed to the showdown which challenged teams to create a dish using two ingredients that go together really well.

Teams' performances on the third rapid cook-off
Team			Dish	Meal	Result
Rapid Cook Off 3
VIC	B	Sam & Chris	Appetiser	Pea and Red Capsicum Soup Shooters	Safe
WA	B	Josh & Andi	Entrée	Whiting with Zucchini and Fennel Salad	Safe
VIC	B	Kerrie & Craig	Main	Steak with Tomato and Anchovy Sauce	Safe
QLD	B	Jake & Elle	Dessert	Italian Sponge with Zabaglione and Coffee Cream	Safe
QLD	W	Dan & Steph	Appetiser	Whiting Ceviche with Avocado Balls	Through to Showdown
VIC	W	Angela & Melina	Entrée	Crispy Duck with Asian Salad	Through to Showdown
NSW	W	Ashlee & Sophia	Main	Marinated Beef with Watercress and Lemon Dipping Sauce	Through to Showdown
NSW	W	Luke & Scott	Dessert	Coconut Sago, Brown Sugar Syrup and Toasted Peanuts	Through to Showdown

Teams' performances in the Showdown
Team		Dish	Result
Showdown
NSW	Ashlee & Sophia	Steamed Fish with Ginger and Shallots	Safe
QLD	Dan & Steph	Lamb Rack with Mint Chimichurri and Parsnip Purée	Safe
NSW	Luke & Scott	Herb Encrusted Lamb Rack with Baked Mint Peas	Safe
VIC	Angela & Melina	Hot and Sour Soup with Seafood and Vegetables	Through to Sudden Death

==== Sudden Death ====
- Episode 27
- Airdate – 14 March 2013
- Description – Third sudden death cook-off. Angela and Melina against Ali and Samuel. Losing team is eliminated.

Sudden Death
Team		Judge's scores						Total (out of 60)	Result
Team		Karen	Guy	Liz	Colin	Pete	Manu	Total (out of 60)	Result
VIC	Angela & Melina	5	6	6	5	6	6	34	Safe
Dish	Entrèe	Barramundi with Salsa Verde and Asparagus							Safe
Dish	Main	Homemade Cicatelli Pasta with Italian Ragu							Safe
Dish	Dessert	Lemon Custard with Biscotti and Amaretto Granita							Safe
TAS	Ali & Samuel	4	4	5	3	5	5	26	Eliminated^{C}
Dish	Entrèe	Polenta with Flathead and Red Capsicum Salsa							Eliminated^{C}
Dish	Main	Masterstock Lamb with Brussels Sprouts							Eliminated^{C}
Dish	Dessert	Pistachio and Almond Tart with Orange Ice Cream							Eliminated^{C}

Note

- ^C – After being eliminated, Ali and Samuel headed to the Comeback Kitchen to compete for a place in the finals

=== Top 9 ===
==== People's Choice Challenge: Melbourne Cup Canapé ====
- Episode 28
- Airdate – 18 March 2013
- Location – Flemington Racecourse, Melbourne, VIC
- Description – Teams headed to the 2012 Melbourne Cup serving canapés to the A-Listers at the Emirates Marquee. Like previous People's Choice challenges, guests voted for their favourite dish, whilst Pete and Manu chose the weakest. This particular challenge was difficult for the judges as they themselves claimed that all teams cooked the best food across all series of My Kitchen Rules.

Teams' performances on the fourth People's Choice Challenge
Team		Dish	Result
NSW	Ashlee & Sophia	Prawn and Fish Dumplings with Pickled Ginger	People's Choice
VIC	Angela & Melina	Lobster Salad	Through to Rapid Cook-off
QLD	Dan & Steph	Sambal Prawns with Avocado Mousse and Mango Emulsion	Through to Rapid Cook-off
SA	Jenna & Joanna	Raspberry Meringue Tarts	Through to Rapid Cook-off
WA	Josh & Andi	Beef Fillet with Beetroot Mousse and Parmesan Wafer	Through to Rapid Cook-off
VIC	Kerrie & Craig	Sashimi Tuna on Baby Cos Lettuce	Through to Rapid Cook-off
NSW	Luke & Scott	Salmon Rillette on Rye Crisps with Horseradish Cream	Through to Rapid Cook-off
VIC	Sam & Chris	Mini Short Bread Biscuits with Ginger Cream and Baked Rhubarb	Through to Rapid Cook-off
QLD	Jake & Elle	Prawns with Mango Salsa and Lime Mayonnaise	Through to Sudden Death

==== Rapid Cook-off: Aussie Favourites ====
- Episode 29
- Airdate – 19 March 2013
- Description – Teams were challenged to use one of eggplant, pumpkin, prawns or salmon to cook a pasta dish in 30 minutes. Both the challenge and ingredients were selected by the Australian public through Facebook. Similar to previous rapid cook-offs, the four weakest teams competed in a following showdown. For the showdown, teams showcased their own favourite dishes. The weakest team from this challenge will head to sudden death.

Teams' performances on the fourth rapid cook-off
Team		Dish	Result
Rapid Cook Off 4
SA	Jenna & Joanna	Seafood Fettuccine	Safe
WA	Josh & Andi	Open Pumpkin Lasagna	Safe
NSW	Luke & Scott	Poached Salmon with Spelt Pasta	Safe
VIC	Angela & Melina	Prawn Ravioli	Through to Showdown
QLD	Dan & Steph	Pappardelle with Pumpkin Sauce	Through to Showdown
VIC	Kerrie & Craig	Spicy Eggplant Fettuccine	Through to Showdown
VIC	Sam & Chris	Smoked Salmon Pappardelle	Through to Showdown

Teams' performances in the Showdown
Team		Dish	Result
Showdown
QLD	Dan & Steph	Steak, Eggs and Chips	Safe
VIC	Kerrie & Craig	Blue-Eye Trevalla with Mash and Parsley Velouté	Safe
VIC	Sam & Chris	Chocolate Orange Gateaux	Safe
VIC	Angela & Melina	Veal Scallopini with Mushroom Sauce	Through to Sudden Death

==== Sudden Death ====
- Episode 30
- Airdate – 20 March 2013
- Description – Sudden death cook-off between Jake & Elle and Angela & Melina. Lower scoring team is eliminated. Angela and Melina are the only team so far to have competed in the sudden death more than once.

Sudden Death
Team		Judge's scores						Total (out of 60)	Result
Team		Karen	Guy	Liz	Colin	Pete	Manu	Total (out of 60)	Result
QLD	Jake & Elle	8	9	8	8	9	8	50	Safe
Dish	Entrèe	Vitello Tonnato							Safe
Dish	Main	John Dory with Fennel Salad							Safe
Dish	Dessert	Chocolate Molten Cakes with Coffee and Fig Ice Cream							Safe
VIC	Angela & Melina	6	7	6	6	6	6	37	Eliminated^{C}
Dish	Entrèe	Mediterranean Octopus with Potato Salad							Eliminated^{C}
Dish	Main	Roast Duck with Wild Rice and Honey Carrots							Eliminated^{C}
Dish	Dessert	Poached Pears Stuffed with Fig and Walnuts with Vanilla Bean Ice Cream							Eliminated^{C}

Note

- ^C – After being eliminated, Angela and Melina headed to the Comeback Kitchen to compete for a place in the finals

=== Top 8 ===
==== People's Choice Challenge: Budget Challenge ====
- Episode 31
- Airdate – 1 April 2013
- Description – Teams must cook to a budget of $10 each, however they were split into two groups of four and were required to pool their money together, resulting in $40 of ingredients per group. Dishes are judged and scored out of 10 by the opposite group through a blind tasting. There was a People's Choice winner from both groups, resulting in two teams being safe from elimination.

Teams' performances on the fifth People's Choice Challenge
Team			Dish	Result
QLD	B	Jake & Elle	Pork Stir Fry with Noodles	People's Choice
VIC	W	Kerrie & Craig	Thai Green Curry	People's Choice
NSW	B	Ashlee & Sophia	Crispy Skin Chicken with Noodles	Through to Rapid Cook-off
QLD	W	Dan & Steph	Nasi goreng with Chicken and Egg	Through to Rapid Cook-off
SA	B	Jenna & Joanna	Ginger Chicken with Rice	Through to Rapid Cook-off
NSW	W	Luke & Scott	Tomato, Feta and Quinoa Salad	Through to Rapid Cook-off
VIC	W	Sam & Chris	Chicken Taco with Avocado Mousse	Through to Rapid Cook-off
WA	B	Josh & Andi	Five-spice Pork Meatballs with Rice	Through to Sudden Death

==== Rapid Cook-off: Winter Warmers ====
- Episode 32
- Airdate – 2 April 2013
- Description – For the Rapid cook-off, teams were to create a winter warmer dish. As a twist, only one member of the team could use the stove, whilst the other can only prepare the ingredients. Only one of the five teams was safe after the cook-off. For the Showdown, teams were challenged to produce a decadent chocolate dessert. The weakest team from the showdown headed to the Sudden Death cook-off.

Teams' performances on the fifth rapid cook-off
Team		Dish	Result
Rapid Cook Off 5
QLD	Dan & Steph	Prawn Wonton Soup	Safe
NSW	Ashlee & Sophia	Cauliflower Soup with Crispy Pancetta	Through to Showdown
SA	Jenna & Joanna	Pumpkin and Pea Risotto	Through to Showdown
NSW	Luke & Scott	Spicy Fish Stew	Through to Showdown
VIC	Sam & Chris	Asian Noodle Broth with Trout	Through to Showdown

Teams' performances in the Showdown
Team		Dish	Result
Showdown
NSW	Luke & Scott	Chilli Chocolate Mousse with Coconut Crème Anglaise and Caramelised Bananas	Safe
SA	Jenna & Joanna	Chocolate Eton Mess	Safe
VIC	Sam & Chris	Salted Caramel Chocolate Cake	Safe
NSW	Ashlee & Sophia	Brownie and Salted Caramel Layer Cake with Chocolate Truffles	Through to Sudden Death

==== Sudden Death ====
- Episode 33
- Airdate – 3 April 2013
- Description – Fifth sudden death cook-off. This time Josh and Andi against Ashlee and Sophia. As per usual, both teams produce a three-course menu, the lower scoring team is eliminated.

Sudden Death
Team		Judge's scores						Total (out of 60)	Result
Team		Karen	Guy	Liz	Colin	Pete	Manu	Total (out of 60)	Result
NSW	Ashlee & Sophia	6	7	7	5	7	7	39	Safe
Dish	Entrèe	Crispy Duck With Banana Blossom Salad							Safe
Dish	Main	Pan Fried Bream with Green Mango and Rice							Safe
Dish	Dessert	Coconut Blancmange with Jackfruit Coulis							Safe
WA	Josh & Andi	7	7	6	6	6	6	38	Eliminated^{N}
Dish	Entrèe	Tamarind Fish with Asian Salad							Eliminated^{N}
Dish	Main	Burmese Dry Beef Curry with Eggplant Pickle							Eliminated^{N}
Dish	Dessert	Coconut Parfait with Mango and Lime							Eliminated^{N}

Note

- ^N – Unlike other eliminated teams from the Top 12 to Top 6, Josh and Andi did not participate in the Comeback Kitchen to return to the competition. Due to Andi's pregnancy, the team turned down the challenge as a personal request. It was also revealed that Josh and Andi had pre-planned with the producers, prior to the cook-off, that they were to leave the competition exactly at that point, regardless of whatever the outcome.

=== Comeback Kitchen Week 1 ===
- Episode 34
- Airdate – 7 April 2013
- Description – Four eliminated teams from the original Top 12, Kieran & Nastassia, Mick & Matt, Ali & Samuel and Angela & Melina, competed in a special comeback kitchen. This special challenge is held and run by new judge, Colin Fassnidge in his Sydney restaurant, 4Fourteen. The four teams designed a two course menu for Colin to review, who then sent the three best teams to serve and cook their two-course menu to order, for paying customers and to judges, Pete and Manu for a blind tasting. Customers paid for what they think the meal was worth. The team who made the highest amount of money automatically headed to the next Comeback Kitchen, whilst the weakest team was re-eliminated and lost their chance to return to the competition. Two remaining teams progressed to the next comeback kitchen.
- This format repeated for the following two comeback kitchens, with newly eliminated teams from the Top 7 and Top 6 sent directly to the challenge after leaving headquarters. Eventually there was one winner, who won the chance to return to the main competition.

Teams' performances on the Comeback Kitchen
Team		Course	Dish	Result	
Team		Course	Dish	Round 1	Round 2
TAS	Mick & Matt	Main	Salmon with Mediterranean Vegetables	Safe	Through to next Comeback Kitchen
TAS	Mick & Matt	Dessert	Black Forest Mousse	Safe	Through to next Comeback Kitchen
VIC	Angela & Melina	Main	Lamb Rack with Pea and Broad Bean Risotto	Safe	Through to next Comeback Kitchen
VIC	Angela & Melina	Dessert	Zabaglione Cream Éclair With Macerated Strawberries	Safe	Through to next Comeback Kitchen
WA	Kieran & Nastassia	Main	Beef Fillet, Salsa Verde and Roasted Vegetables	Safe	Re-eliminated
WA	Kieran & Nastassia	Dessert	Apple Pudding with Fig Salad and Butterscotch Sauce	Safe	Re-eliminated
TAS	Ali & Samuel	Main	Vino Cotto Glazed Pork Belly with Polenta and Caramelised Onions	Re-eliminated	
TAS	Ali & Samuel	Dessert	Berry Vodka Sorbet with Raspberry Coulis	Re-eliminated	

=== Top 7: WA Week ===
All challenges for this week were offsite and held in various locations of Western Australia, including Cable Beach, Margaret River and Perth. The planned challenges took advantage of the seafood and fresh produce uniquely available in this region.

==== People's Choice Challenge: 5-Star Seafood Platter ====
- Episode 35
- Airdate – 8 April 2013
- Location – Cable Beach, Broome, WA
- Description – This challenge was split into two parts. The first mini challenge required teams to head into the water and fish. The team who caught the heaviest load was given the power to choose their choice of seafood for the cooking challenge and determine the order in which the remaining teams pick. The seafood chosen in order were; Threadfin Salmon, Red Emperor, barramundi, Tropical Perch, Rock Lobster, Squid & Prawns and Mud Crab. Teams must use their chosen seafood and create a five-star platter for tourists of the region. A People's Choice winner was declared and the weakest team headed to the next sudden death.

Teams' performances on the sixth People's Choice Challenge
Team		Dish	Result
NSW	Ashlee & Sophia	Middle Eastern Salmon	People's Choice
QLD	Dan & Steph	Balinese Curry with Red Emperor	Through to rapid cook-off
QLD	Jake & Elle	Thai Style Tropical Perch	Through to rapid cook-off
VIC	Kerrie & Craig	Prawn Stuffed Squid with Couscous Salad	Through to rapid cook-off
NSW	Luke & Scott	Chargrilled Rock Lobster with Lemon and Herb Butter	Through to rapid cook-off
VIC	Sam & Chris	Barramundi with Tarator and Fattoush Salad	Through to rapid cook-off
SA	Jenna & Joanna	Mud Crab with Italian Coleslaw and Corn	Through to Sudden Death

==== Rapid Cook-off: Farm Fresh ====
- Episode 36
- Airdate – 9 April 2013
- Location – Margaret River, WA
- Description – Teams headed to Margaret River, Western Australia to cater for the 100th farmers anniversary. Their challenge was to cook 100 meals for 100 farmers in 100 minutes. All produce was taken fresh and directly from the farm patch. Pete and Manu chose the weakest team to face sudden death against Jenna and Joanna.

Teams' performances on the sixth rapid cook-off
Team		Dish	Result
QLD	Dan & Steph	Spiced Lamb with Zucchini Gratin	Safe
QLD	Jake & Elle	Beef Fillet With Potato Stack and Balsamic Reduction	Safe
NSW	Luke & Scott	Herb Crusted Veal with Asparagus and Zucchini Salad and Lemon Aioli	Safe
VIC	Sam & Chris	Vegetable Stack with Lamb Cutlets and Anchovy Butter	Safe
VIC	Kerrie & Craig	Pork Medallions with Beetroot Relish on Sour Cream Pastry	Through to Sudden Death

==== Sudden Death ====
- Episode 37
- Airdate – 10 April 2013
- Location – Perth CBD, WA
- Description – Sudden death cook-off between Jenna & Joanna and Kerrie & Craig. This cook-off was held in Perth, instead of kitchen headquarters. Losing team is eliminated and heads to the next Comeback Kitchen.

Sudden Death
Team		Judge's scores						Total (out of 60)	Result
Team		Karen	Guy	Liz	Colin	Pete	Manu	Total (out of 60)	Result
VIC	Kerrie & Craig	6	6	6	5	6	6	35	Safe
Dish	Entrèe	Baked Goat's Cheese Custard with Asparagus							Safe
Dish	Main	Venison with Braised Red Cabbage and Parsnip Purée							Safe
Dish	Dessert	Frozen Nougat with Berry Compote							Safe
SA	Jenna & Joanna	6	6	6	5	6	5	34	Eliminated^{C}
Dish	Entrèe	Marron with Creamed Leeks and Dill Oil							Eliminated^{C}
Dish	Main	Poached Pork Belly with Green Beans and Brandy Sauce							Eliminated^{C}
Dish	Dessert	Berry and Apple Charlotte with Fresh Berries							Eliminated^{C}

Note

- ^C – After being eliminated, Jenna and Joanna headed to the Comeback Kitchen to compete for a place in the finals

=== Comeback Kitchen Week 2 ===
- Episode 38
- Airdate – 14 April 2013
- Description – Jenna & Joanna join Mick & Matt and Angela & Melina in the second Comeback kitchen to compete for a place in the finals. All teams must design and create a two course menu to be served to paying customers and Pete and Manu for a full operational restaurant. It was decided that all three teams progressed to the next round of serving the dishes. In the end, the team who made the most money automatically headed to the final Comeback kitchen, whilst the weakest team is re-eliminated from the competition.

Teams' performances on the Comeback Kitchen
Team		Course	Dish	Result	
Team		Course	Dish	Round 1	Round 2
TAS	Mick & Matt	Main	Red Cray Tail with Shaved Abalone and Israeli Couscous	Safe	Through to next Comeback Kitchen
TAS	Mick & Matt	Dessert	Meringue Roulade	Safe	Through to next Comeback Kitchen
VIC	Angela & Melina	Main	Veal Saltimbocca, Stuffed Artichokes and Radicchio Salad	Safe	Through to next Comeback Kitchen
VIC	Angela & Melina	Dessert	Middle Eastern Coconut and Citrus Cake with Rosewater	Safe	Through to next Comeback Kitchen
SA	Jenna & Joanna	Main	Duck Breast with Hazelnut Beans, Turnips and Duck Sauce	Safe	Re-eliminated
SA	Jenna & Joanna	Dessert	Strawberry Tart with Toasted Pistachios	Safe	Re-eliminated

=== Top 6: Finals Decider Week ===
At the end of this week, only four teams will remain. There was no People's Choice or rapid cook-off, instead winners from the offsite Food Truck challenge were given advantages for the finals deciders, rather than being safe from elimination. As there were two eliminations, two sudden death cook-offs were held.

==== Food Truck Challenge ====
- Episode 39
- Airdate – 15 April 2013
- Location – Sydney CBD, NSW
- Description – Teams had to cook in food truck kitchens to a theme according to whichever truck key they pulled out of a hat. Teams were split into two groups and were to serve their food to the public. Pete and Manu chose two winning teams and they were then granted the advantageous opportunity to decide which two teams will cook against them in the next elimination round.

Teams' performances on the Food truck challenge
Team		Theme	Dish	Result
NSW	Ashlee & Sophia	Asian	Honey Ginger Steak with Sesame Eggplant	Winners
NSW	Luke & Scott	Mexican	Chicken Adobo Tortillas with Pomegranate and Lime Salad	Winners
QLD	Dan & Steph	Modern Australian	Panko Crumbed Flathead with Roasted Potato Salad and Creole Salsa	Through to Cook-off 1 versus Ashlee & Sophia
VIC	Sam & Chris	Pasta	Pappardelle Pasta with Chorizo, Tomato and Fresh Herbs	Through to Cook-off 1 versus Ashlee & Sophia
QLD	Jake & Elle	Organic	Spelt Pizza with Caramelised Onions and Beef	Through to Cook-off 2 versus Luke & Scott
VIC	Kerrie & Craig	Vegetarian	Veggie Burgers with Harissa and Parsley Salad	Through to Cook-off 2 versus Luke & Scott

==== Finals Decider: Group 1 ====
- Episode 40
- Airdate – 16 April 2013
- Description – Round 1 of 2 elimination cook-offs. Teams competing were chosen by Ashlee and Sophia, after winning the previous challenge. They were also able to allocate specific ingredients to the other teams; kidney, apples or walnuts. One of the three teams went straight to the finals, whilst the other two competed in a following sudden death cook-off

Teams' performances in the cook-off
Team		Dish	Result
QLD	Dan & Steph	Braised Veal Shanks with Apple Sauce and Mashed Potato	Through to finals
NSW	Ashlee & Sophia	Sautéed Kidneys with Red Wine Sauce and Potato Gratin	Through to Sudden Death
VIC	Sam & Chris	Sticky Date and Walnut Pudding with Butterscotch Sauce and Walnut Praline	Through to Sudden Death

Sudden Death
Team		Judge's scores						Total (out of 60)	Result
Team		Karen	Guy	Liz	Colin	Pete	Manu	Total (out of 60)	Result
VIC	Sam & Chris	7	8	7	6	8	8	44	Safe
Dish	Signature Dish	Salmon with Celeriac Puree and Dill Beurre Blanc							Safe
NSW	Ashlee & Sophia	7	7	7	7	8	7	43	Eliminated^{C}
Dish	Signature Dish	Pork Belly with Caramel Sauce, Chinese Steamed Buns and Asian Salad							Eliminated^{C}

Note

- ^C – After being eliminated, Ashlee and Sophia headed to the Comeback Kitchen to compete for a place in the finals

==== Finals Decider: Group 2 ====
- Episode 41
- Airdate – 17 April 2013
- Description – Second round of finals deciders. This time under the reigns of Luke and Scott. From winning the previous truck challenge, Luke and Scott were able to allocate the three main ingredients for the other teams and themselves. Ingredients available were ginger, cherries and eel. One team progressed to the finals after the first cook-off and the other teams competed in a subsequent sudden death cook-off with the losing team being eliminated

Teams' performances in the cook-off
Team		Dish	Result
QLD	Jake & Elle	Unagi Don with Nori Strips	Through to finals
NSW	Luke & Scott	Ginger Kangaroo with Sweet Potato Bake and Ginger Dipping Sauce	Through to Sudden Death
VIC	Kerrie & Craig	Tea Smoked Duck with Crispy Potatoes, Leeks and Cherry Sauce	Through to Sudden Death

Sudden Death
Team		Judge's scores						Total (out of 60)	Result
Team		Karen	Guy	Liz	Colin	Pete	Manu	Total (out of 60)	Result
NSW	Luke & Scott	7	6	7	6	6	6	38	Safe
Dish	Signature Dish	Blue-Eye Trevalla with Pea Smash and Freekeh Salad							Safe
VIC	Kerrie & Craig	6	6	6	5	7	7	37	Eliminated^{C}
Dish	Signature Dish	Stuffed Lamb Backstrap with Roasted Capsicum, Eggplant and Red Wine Jus							Eliminated^{C}

Note

- ^C – After being eliminated, Kerrie and Craig headed to the Comeback Kitchen to compete for a place in the finals

=== Comeback Kitchen Week 3 ===
- Episode 42
- Airdate – 21 April 2013
- Description – After two eliminations from the main competition, Ashlee & Sophia along with Kerrie & Craig join Angela & Melina and Mick & Matt in the final Comeback Kitchen. As per usual, all four teams were to design a two course, Main and Dessert meal. These were presented to Colin who only allowed three teams to progress to the next round of restaurant operation. In the end, the team who made the least amount of money was immediately out of the running, while the judges picked one of the two remaining teams to return into the finals.

Teams' performances on the Comeback Kitchen
Team		Dish	Result
Round 1: Main
TAS	Mick & Matt	Roasted Venison, Braised Cabbage and Broccolini	Safe
VIC	Angela & Melina	Chargrilled Quail with Italian Ragu	Safe
NSW	Ashlee & Sophia	Roast Bream with Shellfish Broth	Safe
VIC	Kerrie & Craig	Beef Eye Fillet, Peppercorn & Whiskey Sauce and Roast Vegetable Salad	Re-eliminated
Round 2: Dessert
TAS	Mick & Matt	Double Chocolate Tart with Raspberries	Winners
VIC	Angela & Melina	Lemon Cannoli	Re-eliminated
NSW	Ashlee & Sophia	Apple and Blueberry Crumble	Re-eliminated

=== Final 5 ===
- Episode 43
- Airdate – 22 April 2013
- Description – The Top 4 teams were given a surprise announcement when an eliminated team returned to the competition after their victory from Comeback Kitchen. Teams had to create an Amuse-bouche, a single bite-sized creation in 60 minutes. The three best teams progressed to the Semifinals, whilst the weakest two competed in a Sudden death, the losing team was eliminated. Teams were also ranked from 1st to 4th to determine who cooks against whom in the semifinals. For Semifinal 1, 2nd place will play 3rd and for Semifinal 2, 1st place will play 4th.

Teams' performances on the challenge
Team		Dish	Result
QLD	Jake & Elle	Beetroot and Goat's Cheese Stack with Balsamic Gel and Watermelon Foam	1st
QLD	Dan & Steph	Seared Beef with Salt and Pepper Bone Marrow and Beetroot	2nd
NSW	Luke & Scott	Seared Scallops with Caramelised Chorizo, Pickled Apple and Lime Mayonnaise	3rd
TAS	Mick & Matt	Sesame Prawns with Green Mango and Cucumber Salad	Through to Sudden Death
VIC	Sam & Chris	Tuna Tartare Cornet with Avocado and Wasabi Mousse	Through to Sudden Death

Sudden Death
Team		Judge's scores						Total (out of 60)	Result
Team		Karen	Guy	Liz	Colin	Pete	Manu	Total (out of 60)	Result
TAS	Mick & Matt	8	8	9	8	8	8	49	Safe
Dish	Signature Dish	Chocolate Pecan Meringue Cake with Coffee Dates and Vanilla Sour Cream							Safe
VIC	Sam & Chris	7	7	8	7	7	8	44	Eliminated
Dish	Signature Dish	Braised Beef Cheeks with Pumpkin and Spinach Ravioli and Baby Carrots							Eliminated

=== Semifinals ===
==== Semifinal 1 ====
- Episode 44
- Airdate – 23 April 2013
- Description – The finals have arrived, commencing with Semifinal 1, Queensland's Dan and Steph versus New South Wales' Luke and Scott. Both teams will cook their ultimate three-course meal for guest judges and Pete and Manu. The winning team advances to the Grand Final for a chance at the $250,000 prize.

Semifinal 1
Team		Judge's scores						Total (out of 60)	Result
Team		Karen	Guy	Liz	Colin	Pete	Manu	Total (out of 60)	Result
QLD	Dan & Steph	8	8	8	7	8	7	46	Through to Grand Final
Dishes	Entree	Deconstructed Whiting Nicoise Salad							Through to Grand Final
Dishes	Main	Babi Guling with Blood Sausage and Snake Beans							Through to Grand Final
Dishes	Dessert	Frangipane Tart with Yoghurt Sorbet							Through to Grand Final
NSW	Luke & Scott	7	7	7	6	7	7	41	Eliminated
Dishes	Entree	Stuffed Quail with Walnut, Fig and Goats Cheese Salad							Eliminated
Dishes	Main	Fennel Sword Fish, Gremolata and Beetroot Purée with a Grapefruit and Celery Salad							Eliminated
Dishes	Dessert	Chocolate Chilli Torte with Orange Mascarpone and Espresso Sauce							Eliminated

==== Semifinal 2 ====
- Episode 45
- Airdate – 24 April 2013
- Description – In the second semifinal, Jake and Elle take on 'Comeback Kings' Mick and Matt. Both teams fight for the second position in the Grand final, once again producing a three-course meal for guest judges and Pete & Manu.

Semifinal 2
Team		Judge's scores						Total (out of 60)	Result
Team		Karen	Guy	Liz	Colin	Pete	Manu	Total (out of 60)	Result
QLD	Jake & Elle	7	9	9	8	9	9	51	Through to Grand Final
Dishes	Entree	Smoked Kingfish with Caper Gremolata							Through to Grand Final
Dishes	Main	Rabbit Confit with Crumbed Kidneys, Soft Polenta and Chervil and Parsley Salad							Through to Grand Final
Dishes	Dessert	Yoghurt Panna Cotta With Lemon Zest Jelly, White Peaches And Thyme Syrup							Through to Grand Final
TAS	Mick & Matt	7	7	7	7	8	8	44	Re-eliminated
Dishes	Entree	Smoked Eel Chowder							Re-eliminated
Dishes	Main	Crusted Lamb with Parsnip Purée and Roasted Bullhorn Capsicum							Re-eliminated
Dishes	Dessert	White Chocolate Mousse Cake with Lemon Curd and Raspberries							Re-eliminated

=== Grand Final ===
- Episode 46
- Airdate – 28 April 2013
- Description – Dan & Steph are the first team to enter the MKR 2013 grand final followed by fellow Queensland team, Jake and Elle. Both teams take on the challenge for the MKR 2013 title and the $250,000 prize. Serving a five-course meal, totalling 100 plates of food each, to guest judges and Pete and Manu for the final verdict. Friends, family and eliminated contestants are all back to join the party, as Costa Del Sol and Decadence open their doors. This is the second grand final of MKR where both teams are from the same state, following the South Australian teams from the 2012 finale.

Grand Final results
Team		Judge's scores						Total (out of 60)	Result
Team		Karen	Guy	Liz	Colin	Pete	Manu	Total (out of 60)	Result
QLD	Dan & Steph	9	9	9	9	9	9	54	Winners
Dishes		Decadence							Winners
1st course		Scallop Ceviche							Winners
2nd course		Squab with Chestnuts and Redcurrant Sauce							Winners
3rd course		Flathead Sausage with Confit Potatoes							Winners
4th course		Lamb Roulade with Smoked Carrots and Mint Pesto							Winners
5th course		Chocolate Peppermint Delice							Winners
QLD	Jake & Elle	8	9	9	8	9	9	52	Runners up
Dishes		Costa Del Sol							Runners up
1st course		Wagyu Beef Carpaccio							Runners up
2nd course		Quail with Figs and Gorgonzola Sauce							Runners up
3rd course		Rock Lobster and Semolina Wafer Stack							Runners up
4th course		Confit Duck with Artichoke Purée and Balsamic Sauce							Runners up
5th course		Strawberry and Amaretto Semifreddo							Runners up

== Ratings ==
The television nightly ratings on aggregate figures of the 2013 series of My Kitchen Rules on free-to-air Seven Network channel were gathered from TV Tonight covering only the five city metro across Australia, namely: Adelaide, Brisbane, Melbourne, Perth, and Sydney. The number of viewers presented in the table below are in millions.

Colour key:
– Highest rating during the series
– Lowest rating during the series
– An elimination was held in this episode
– Finals week

Wk.	Episode		Air date	Viewers	Nightly rank	Weekly rank	Source
1	1	Instant restaurant 1–1: Kerrie & Craig	Monday, 28 January	1.384	#3	#5	
1	2	Instant restaurant 1–2: Mick & Matt	Tuesday, 29 January	1.647	#1	#3	
1	3	Instant restaurant 1–3: Josh & Andi	Wednesday, 30 January	1.655	#1	#2	
2	4	Instant restaurant 1–4: Vicky & Priya	Monday, 4 February	2.228	#1	#1	
2	5	Instant restaurant 1–5: Jake & Elle	Tuesday, 5 February	2.128	#1	#3	
2	6	Instant restaurant 1–6: Lisa & Stefano	Wednesday, 6 February	2.172	#1	#2	
2	7	Instant restaurant 2–1: Sam & Chris	Thursday, 7 February	1.801	#1	#4	
3	8	Instant restaurant 2–2: Lisa & Candice	Monday, 11 February	1.800	#1	#4	
3	9	Instant restaurant 2–3: Ali & Samuel	Tuesday, 12 February	1.916	#1	#2	
3	10	Instant restaurant 2–4: Luke & Scott	Wednesday, 13 February	2.106	#1	#1	
3	11	Instant restaurant 2–5: Dan & Steph	Thursday, 14 February	1.886	#1	#3	
4	12	Instant restaurant 2–6: Jenna & Joanna	Monday, 18 February	2.118	#1	#1	
4	13	Instant restaurant 3–1: Angela & Melina	Tuesday, 19 February	1.978	#1	#2	
4	14	Instant restaurant 3–2: Dan & Steph	Wednesday, 20 February	1.755	#1	#4	
4	15	Instant restaurant 3–3: Kieran & Nastassia	Thursday, 21 February	1.862	#1	#3	
5	16	Instant restaurant 3–4: Ali & Samuel	Monday, 25 February	2.180	#1	#2	
5	17	Instant restaurant 3–5: Lisa & Stefano	Tuesday, 26 February	2.076	#1	#3	
5	18	Instant restaurant 3–6: Ashlee and Sophia	Wednesday, 27 February	2.355	#1	#1	
5	19	People's Choice Challenge 1: Annual Block Party	Thursday, 28 February	1.952	#1	#4	
6	20	Rapid Cook-off 1	Monday, 4 March	1.791	#1	#2	
6	21	Sudden Death 1	Tuesday, 5 March	1.903	#1	#1	
6	22	People's Choice Challenge 2: Market Food	Wednesday, 6 March	1.753	#1	#3	
6	23	Rapid Cook-off 2	Thursday, 7 March	1.739	#1	#4	
7	24	Sudden Death 2	Monday, 11 March	1.869	#1	#1	
7	25	People's Choice Challenge 3: Kids' Lunch	Tuesday, 12 March	1.805	#1	#2	
7	26	Rapid Cook-off 3	Wednesday, 13 March	1.803	#1	#3	
7	27	Sudden Death 3	Thursday, 14 March	1.679	#1	#4	
8	28	People's Choice Challenge 4: Budget Challenge	Monday, 18 March	1.729	#1	#4	
8	29	Rapid Cook-off 4	Tuesday, 19 March	1.755	#1	#3	
8	30	Sudden Death 4	Wednesday, 20 March	1.563	#4	#7	
9	31	People's Choice Challenge 5: 5-Star Seafood Platter	Monday, 1 April	1.921	#1	#2	
9	32	Rapid Cook-off 5	Tuesday, 2 April	1.900	#1	#3	
9	33	Sudden Death 5	Wednesday, 3 April	2.089	#1	#1	
10	34	Comeback Kitchen 1	Sunday, 7 April	1.406	#4	#7	
10	35	People's Choice Challenge 6	Monday, 8 April	1.586	#2	#6	
10	36	Rapid Cook-off 6	Tuesday, 9 April	1.368	#2	#10	
10	37	Sudden Death 6	Wednesday, 10 April	1.405	#2	#8	
11	38	Comeback Kitchen 2	Sunday, 14 April	1.411	#5	#11	
11	39	Food Truck Challenge	Monday, 15 April	1.540	#2	#7	
11	40	Finals Decider 1	Tuesday, 16 April	1.674	#2	#5	
11	41	Finals Decider 2	Wednesday, 17 April	1.894	#1	#3	
12	42	Comeback Kitchen 3	Sunday, 21 April	1.556	#3	#6	
12	43	Final 5	Monday, 22 April	1.666	#2	#5	
12	44	Semifinal 1	Tuesday, 23 April	1.543	#2	#7	
12	45	Semifinal 2	Wednesday, 24 April	1.784	#1	#4	
13	46	Grand Final	Sunday, 28 April	2.154	#2	#2	
13	46	Winner Announced	Sunday, 28 April	2.952	#1	#1	
Series average				1.835	#1	#4	
