= River Cottage Australia =

- Based on: River Cottage
- Presented by: Paul West
- Country of origin: Australia
- Original language: English
- No. of seasons: 4
- No. of episodes: 32

Production
- Production location: Central Tilba, New South Wales
- Production companies: ITV Studios Australia (2013); Keo Films (2013–present)

Original release
- Network: The LifeStyle Channel (2013–2014); LifeStyle Food (2015–present)
- Release: 27 June 2013 – 17 May 2016

River Cottage Australia is an Australian adaptation of the English franchise of the same name. The series sees former chef Paul West showcase local produce and farming while attempting to live in a self-sufficient manner. The series premiered on 27 June 2013 on The LifeStyle Channel and ran for two seasons before moving to The LifeStyle Channel's sister network LifeStyle Food in 2015 where it aired a further two seasons.

== Development ==
On 30 November 2012, The LifeStyle Channel announced they had commissioned a local adaption of the English franchise River Cottage. This marked the first time the series had been adapted internationally. The series saw English host Hugh Fearnley-Whittingstall travel to Australia to search for an Australian host and mentor them. The series was set to begin production in early 2013. On 25 March 2013 it was announced the host would be Tasmanian chef Paul West and the River Cottage would be located in Central Tilba, New South Wales. The first season, consisting of 8 episodes, premiered on 27 June 2013 and was a co-production between ITV Studios Australia and Keo Films.

On 16 August 2013, The LifeStyle Channel renewed the series for an additional two seasons. However, unlike season one which was a co-production between ITV Studios Australia and Keo Films, the new seasons would solely be produced by Keo Films.

The second season premiered on 1 May 2014.

In April 2015, it was announced the third season, consisting of 8 episodes, would premiere on 26 May 2015. However, unlike previous seasons, the series would premiere on The LifeStyle Channel's sister network LifeStyle Food.

On 5 November 2015, it was announced the series had been renewed for a fourth season, which premiered on 29 March 2016.

It was confirmed in January 2017 that the program had been cancelled. In June 2017, the 22-acre property featured in the show was sold with West and his family relocating to Newcastle.

== Episodes ==
=== Series overview ===
Series	Episodes	Originally released		
Series	Episodes	First released	Last released	Network
1	8	27 June 2013	15 August 2013	The LifeStyle Channel
2	8	1 May 2014	19 June 2014	The LifeStyle Channel
3	8	26 May 2015	14 July 2015	LifeStyle Food
4	8	29 March 2016	17 May 2016	LifeStyle Food

=== Season 1 (2013) ===
No. overall	No. in season	Title	Original release date	Overnight Australian viewers
1	1	"Episode 1"	27 June 2013	110,000
2	2	"Episode 2"	4 July 2013	126,000
3	3	"Episode 3"	11 July 2013	95,000
4	4	"Episode 4"	18 July 2013	95,000
5	5	"Episode 5"	25 July 2013	108,000
6	6	"Episode 6"	1 August 2013	86,000
7	7	"Episode 7"	8 August 2013	87,000
8	8	"Episode 8"	15 August 2013	118,000

=== Season 2 (2014) ===
No. overall	No. in season	Title	Original release date	Overnight Australian viewers
9	1	"Episode 1"	1 May 2014	132,000
10	2	"Episode 2"	8 May 2014	103,000
11	3	"Episode 3"	15 May 2014	99,000
12	4	"Episode 4"	22 May 2014	98,000
13	5	"Episode 5"	29 May 2014	106,000
14	6	"Episode 6"	5 June 2014	129,000
15	7	"Episode 7"	12 June 2014	132,000
16	8	"Episode 8"	19 June 2014	96,000

=== Season 3 (2015) ===
No. overall	No. in season	Title	Original release date	Overnight Australian viewers
17	1	"Episode 1"	26 May 2015	69,000
18	2	"Episode 2"	2 June 2015	72,000
19	3	"Episode 3"	9 June 2015	65,000
20	4	"Episode 4"	16 June 2015	58,000
21	5	"Episode 5"	23 June 2015	61,000
22	6	"Episode 6"	30 June 2015	71,000
23	7	"Episode 7"	7 July 2015	82,000
24	8	"Episode 8"	14 July 2015	86,000

=== Season 4 (2016) ===
No. overall	No. in season	Title	Original release date	Overnight Australian viewers
25	1	"Episode 1"	29 March 2016	59,000
26	2	"Episode 2"	5 April 2016	N/A
27	3	"Episode 3"	12 April 2016	N/A
28	4	"Episode 4"	19 April 2016	N/A
29	5	"Episode 5"	26 April 2016	39,000
30	6	"Episode 6"	3 May 2016	N/A
31	7	"Episode 7"	10 May 2016	43,000
32	8	"Episode 8"	17 May 2016	N/A

== Reception ==
In addition to Episode 2 being the 47th most watched non-sport show of 2013, the first season was "the number one non-sports program across the STV platform while it was airing" and had "the second largest consolidated audience for The LifeStyle Channel in 2013".

=== Awards and nominations ===
Year	Award	Category	Outcome	Ref
2015	ASTRA Awards	Most Outstanding Lifestyle Program	Nominated	

== Home media ==
Season	Episodes	DVD release dates			
Season	Episodes	Region 1	Region 2	Region 4	Discs
1	8	—N/a	—N/a	16 October 2013	2
2	8	—N/a	—N/a	12 November 2014	2
3	8	—N/a	—N/a	18 November 2015	3

== See also ==
- List of Australian television series
- List of cooking shows
