= River Cottage Spring =

UK TV show

- Starring: Hugh Fearnley-Whittingstall
- Country of origin: United Kingdom
- Original language: English
- No. of episodes: 4

Production
- Executive producer: Sara Woodford
- Producers: Charlotte Crosse, Jamie D'Cruz

Original release
- Network: Channel 4
- Release: 24 May 2008

River Cottage Spring is a Channel 4 programme that follows Hugh Fearnley-Whittingstall at his Dorset home and teaching school River Cottage throughout the spring of 2008, harvesting crops, cooking organic food, teaching families to be smallholders and challenging Tesco against the source its chicken products.

== List of episodes ==
Ep.	Air Date	Summary
1	24 May 2008	Fearnley-Whittingstall cooks using produce from Britain's abundant spring harvest, including freshly-picked asparagus. He tested his mother's shepherd's pie recipe against Delia Smith's cheat version with surprising results, and five Bristol families are challenged to turn an acre of city land into an urban smallholding. He also has a ‘Chicken Out campaign’, encouraging people to ditch extensive farmed chicken in favour of free-range birds and challenging Tesco.
2	Unknown	Fearnley-Whittingstall starts with a lettuce competition against his two chefs, Gill Mellar and Tim Maddams. The Bristol smallholding receives four saddleback pigs, and vegetarian apprentice Susan accepts the task of butchering a whole lamb's carcass. Fearnley-Whittingstall 's country honey is also tested against the city variety at a taste-off in Broadway market.
3	Unknown	Fearnley-Whittingstall de-pods broad beans for a home-made dish of beans on toast. Meanwhile, Jess, who is a vegan, chooses a batch of hens from a battery egg farm as the Bristol experiment to turn an acre of derelict city land into a smallholding continues. Back at River Cottage, Hugh Fearnley-Whittingstall organises a foraging competition and discovers his ducklings have hatched eggs early. His once-vegetarian apprentice Susan now can butcher and eat meat comfortably.
4	Unknown	Fearnley-Whittingstall concludes the series with a fair to celebrate the first sign of summer. He also cooks up wet garlic recipes with Tim Maddams. Fearnley-Whittingstall also takes his hairdresser and her girl friends out fishing and they enjoy cuttlefish.
