= Paul West (chef) =

Australian chef and TV presenter

Paul West is an Australian chef and TV presenter best-known for River Cottage Australia.

== Early life and personal life ==
West was born on 27 January 1984 in Murrurundi – a small town in the Hunter Region of New South Wales.

West trained as a chef. He worked at Vue de Monde as a bistro chef and also met his wife, Alicia, there. They have two children together.

== Television work ==
His most notable TV work is River Cottage Australia, in which West and Hugh Fearnley-Whittingstall set up a working farm and present recipes based on the farm's produce. This is based on the UK Channel 4 series Escape to River Cottage and its subsequent seasons. Other work includes Back Roads Australia and most recently, Catalyst: "The Great Australian Bee Challenge" for ABC TV (Australia).

== River Cottage Australia ==
River Cottage Australia is an Australian adaptation of the British series Escape to River Cottage. It sees the West showcase local produce and farming while attempting to live in a self-sufficient manner. The series premiered in 2013 on The LifeStyle Channel and ran for two seasons before moving to The LifeStyle Channel's sister network Lifestyle Food in 2015.
