= A Cook on the Wild Side =

British television series

A Cook on the Wild Side is a television series in which celebrity chef Hugh Fearnley-Whittingstall travels about Britain while trying to ostensibly gather the food he eats from the landscape (both rural and urban) during his travels, without the use of money. This is a forerunner to his River Cottage series that further explores self-sufficiency.

Two series were produced (aired in 1995 and 1997, respectively). The first series featured Hugh travelling in a modified Land rover (the "Gastro Wagon") and the second with him aboard a specially adapted motor cruiser river boat (the "Bain Marie").

A book was published to accompany the series.

== List of episodes ==
=== Series 1 ===
Episode	Section titles	Episode location and overview
1	1. Wilderness training 2. Minnows & Hogweed; 3. Witchcraft & Wine; 4. Welsh Rabbit	
2	1.Babbing 2.Trespassing: 3. Wild Game Birds; 4. Poachers Pie	
3	1. Herbiculture; 2. Bass Fishing; 3. Lobster Potting; 4. Fish Soup	
4	1. Samphire Pickling; 2. Squirrel Skewers; 3. Hard Graft; 4. Travellers' Picnic	
5	1. Scallop Diving; 2. Guddling; 3. Brewing Beer; 4. Heather Picking	Scotland
6	1. Urban Foraging; 2. Snail City; 3. Thames Cuisine; 4. Blagging & Scavenging	Urban foraging in London, featuring Richard Mabey

=== Series 2 ===
Episode	Section titles	Episode location and overview
1	1. Birch sap wine; 2. American Invaders; 3. Boating Culture; 4. Hare Stew	
2	1. Elver Netting; 2. Pilgrim's Salad; 3. Techno Fishing; 4. Smoked Zander	The Midlands
3	1. Willow Coppicing; 2. Clam Digging; 3. Mushroom Safari; 4. Forrest Fritters	
4	1. Dock Pudding; 2. Lucky Dip; 3. Floral Feast; 4. Pan Fried Rook	
