= River Cottage Forever =

- Created by: Hugh Fearnley-Whittingstall
- Starring: Hugh Fearnley-Whittingstall
- Country of origin: United Kingdom
- Original language: English
- No. of episodes: 8

Production
- Producer: Richard Ellingham
- Running time: 30 minutes (with commercials)

Original release
- Network: Channel 4
- Release: 16 July – 3 September 2002

River Cottage Forever is the third in the "River Cottage" Channel 4 series franchise, following on from Escape to River Cottage and Return to River Cottage in which chef and journalist Hugh Fearnley-Whittingstall de-camped from the rat-race of city living to move to the rolling hills of the Dorset countryside, which provided the perfect backdrop for his experiment to live off the fat of the land in as self-sufficient a style as possible, tucked away at the bottom of one of the Dorset valleys is the ideal home: River Cottage.

In his first year Fearnley-Whittingstall had just the cottage and the garden but he soon found he needed more land. In his second year he negotiated a deal with a neighbour to rent four acres (≃16,200 m^{2}). His smallholding now boasted a polytunnel for growing vegetables, a fox-proof high rise chicken accommodation and a pasture for his sheep, cows and pigs.

== List of episodes ==
Ep.	Air Date	Summary
1	16 July 2002	In his third year at River Cottage, Fearnley-Whittingstall is finally about to see the first birth at River Cottage, but some things take time. His "Chickenopolis" is also extended in readiness for Fearnley-Whittingstall's quest to breed the "ultimate" roasting chicken. He also travels the 8 miles down the River Brit from River Cottage to the sea by kayak.
2	23 July 2002	Fearnley-Whittingstall has his eye on the grass Carp in his friend Anthony's ornamental lake. He persuades Anthony to let him catch one and prove it's edible. If he fails, there's a forfeit to pay. Fearnley-Whittingstall's sheep also finally delivers the first River Cottage livestock, but not without a scare for him.
3	30 July 2002	For Fearnley-Whittingstall, there's plenty of bad news concerning the livestock today: Marge the cow's pregnancy has been greatly exaggerated and the Indian Game cock turns out to be all beak and no trouser. This means that there won't be the beef steer Hugh was expecting and his plans for the "ultimate roasting chicken" have been set back. On the bright side, there's a successful day's work catching cuttlefish and shooting wood pigeon.
4	6 August 2002	After last year's failed hay harvest, Fearnley-Whittingstall is hoping the weather will hold out for him to harvest this year's hay. Fearnley-Whittingstall turns out for the local cricket team and makes an edible contribution to the tea break.
5	13 August 2002	River Cottage is alive to the sound of chirping chicks, after the initial set-back due to the "under-performing" cockerel. Fearnley-Whittingstall and one of his animals Delia are entered in the Oakhampton Show. He also makes a courgette dish after his crop was save from insect attacks.
6	20 August 2002	Fearnley-Whittingstall has set his sights on the Vegetable Cup at the Beaminster Show. There's also an opportunity to get some cash out of Devon's tourists with home-made iced-lollies and a blind-folded Fearnley-Whittingstall is taken to a secret location to hunt for truffles with Delia.
7	27 August 2002	There is a sombre start to the day as one of the sheep has died in the night, the first animal Fearnley-Whittingstall has lost. An orchard is planted which will provide apples all year long and with the help of Victor Borge, Ray Smith and Richard, the "ultimate roasting chicken" is found. He further makes black pudding and Spanish morcilla with Smith using pig's blood from Fearnley-Whittingstall smallholding.
8	3 September 2002	It's Hallowe'en at River Cottage and Fearnley-Whittingstall is celebrating with the locals and trying his hand at the ancient game of pumpkin fettling. There's also money to be earned so Fearnley-Whittingstall teams up with Michael Michaud to sell their chillis in London – the "city of sin"
