= Britain's Best Sitcom =

2004 British TV series

- Genre: Documentary
- Written by: See list of episodes
- Directed by: See list of episodes
- Presented by: See list of episodes
- Country of origin: United Kingdom
- Original language: English
- No. of series: 1
- No. of episodes: 12

Production
- Executive producers: Ricky Kelehar (episodes 2–11); Robin Ashbrook (episode 12)
- Producers: See list of episodes
- Running time: 180 min. (ep. 1); 60 min. (ep. 2–11); 90 min. (ep. 12)
- Production company: BBC Manchester

Original release
- Network: BBC Two
- Release: 10 January – 27 March 2004

Britain's Best Sitcom is a 12-episode documentary series that BBC Two transmitted from 10 January to 27 March 2004. It was part of a nationwide media campaign and opinion poll conducted by the BBC in 2003 and 2004.

The BBC asked television viewers to select their favourite British situation comedies from a list of 100, with the option to supply one write-in candidate. In the first poll, conducted in August 2003, viewers could vote via telephone or the BBC's website; the second, conducted January–March 2004, added the option of voting by text message. This second poll coincided with the television programme, which celebrated the top 50 sitcoms from the first poll, and urged viewers to vote their preference from the top 10.

In the three-hour premiere episode, Jonathan Ross summarised the progress of the poll, and presented video clips from the 50 sitcoms that received the most votes. Each of the next ten weekly episodes, one hour in length, focused on one sitcom from the top 10. In each episode, a different presenter advocated a particular sitcom, delivering 20 reasons why it deserved viewers' votes. The sitcom's writers and actors, as well as celebrity viewers, also shared their own perspectives and memories. In the 90-minute finale, transmitted live, Jonathan Ross announced the top sitcom to be Only Fools and Horses.

Britain's Best Sitcom was preceded by the BBC Two programmes Great Britons (2002) and The Big Read (2003), each of which was also based on national opinion polls.

== Structure of the polls ==
=== Round one: Selecting the top 50 ===
Before the opening the poll, the BBC compiled a list of 100 "top [British] sitcoms" based on input from "sitcom writers and TV comedy experts". This list constituted the nominees for the first of the two rounds of votes solicited from the public.

The BBC posted a homepage and ballot web page for the Britain's Best Sitcom poll to the BBCi website on 28 July 2003. In August, they advertised the poll in the Radio Times magazine, on the BBCi website, and via the national teletext service Ceefax, inviting the public to "have your say" and "play your part in a major television event".

The ballot required voters either to select 10 sitcoms from the list, or to select nine and then nominate a write-in candidate. Voters could not rank their 10 selections by preference. Votes by telephone incurred a charge of 10 pence per minute. On 30 December 2003, the BBC published a press release promoting the forthcoming Britain's Best Sitcom series on BBC Two, and listing the 50 sitcoms that received the most votes. The list was alphabetical; it did not reveal the number of votes that any sitcom received, or its rank in the list. It contained no write-in candidates.

=== Round two: The top 10 ===
==== The launch ====
On 10 January 2004, the BBC published another press release to promote the series, which was to begin that night on BBC Two. The press release provided more details about the programme and the vote, including an alphabetical list of the 10 finalists, and a ranked list of the rest of the top 50 sitcoms. The premiere episode of Britain's Best Sitcom began at 9 PM and concluded at midnight. From Goodnight Sweetheart (number 50) to Father Ted (number 11), it counted down the first 40 of 50 highest-ranked sitcoms. The final 30 minutes of the programme comprised a preview of the 10 future episodes devoted to the finalists.

==== The vote ====
Each of the next 10 episodes of Britain's Best Sitcom was one hour long, and devoted to one of the 10 finalists. The "celebrity advocate" in each episode gave 20 reasons why their sitcom was the best. Their arguments were illustrated by video clips from the sitcom. On-screen messages in the episodes, as well as web pages in the BBC's website, and listings in the Radio Times—informed viewers and readers that they could vote by telephone, by text message (SMS), or online. Voting by text message was only possible in this final round of voting. Votes by telephone were less expensive than in the first round, because they lasted no more than one minute. A vote by telephone cost 10 pence; a vote by text message incurred a charge of 10–12 pence, depending on the mobile network operator. For each of the finalists, online voters had access to an essay about the sitcom (from the BBCi Guide to Comedy), a selection of quotes from the advocate's arguments and from online comments, and an annotated video clip of a scene from one episode.

The poll opened at 9 PM on 10 January 2004 (when the Britain's Best Sitcom premiere began). The voting rules allowed up to five people per household to vote. After the transmission of each weekly episode, viewer's had an opportunity to change their vote. The BBC collected demographic profile data as part of the poll. It required online voters to answer three market segmentation questions: whether they are male or female; which region of the UK they live in, and which age group they belong to. Voting closed on the night of 27 March 2004.

==== The result ====
Near the end of the live, final episode of Britain's Best Sitcom, Jonathan Ross announced Only Fools and Horses to be the top sitcom by popular vote. After the programme's conclusion, the BBC published a ranked list of all 100 sitcoms on their website, along with the official vote tally for the top 10.

== Episodes ==
No.	Title	Presented by	Directed by	Written by	Produced by	Original release date
1	"The Launch"	Jonathan Ross	Andy Devonshire	Robin Ince, Steve Punt, Lloyd Stanton	Shirley Hunt Benson, Will Bryant, Stephen McGinn, Cybele Rowbottom	10 January 2004
Jonathan Ross recaps the 50 top British sitcoms, as determined by an electronic poll conducted in 2003.
2	"Blackadder"	John Sergeant	Garry John Hughes	Phill Jupitus	Garry John Hughes	17 January 2004
John Sergeant advocates Blackadder, a series of historical farces that premiered in 1983 on BBC1.
3	"Fawlty Towers"	Jack Dee	Matt O'Casey	Jack Dee	Matt O'Casey	24 January 2004
Jack Dee advocates Fawlty Towers, a comedy set in a dysfunctional hotel that premiered on BBC2 in 1975 and ran for two series.
4	"The Good Life"	Ulrika Jonsson	Becky Martin	Robin Ince, Richard Webber	Mark Turnbull	31 January 2004
Ulrika Jonsson advocates The Good Life, a sitcom about a middle-class English couple who make an attempt at farming at their house in the southwest London suburb of Surbiton. It premiered on BBC1 in 1975.
5	"Yes Minister"	Armando Iannucci	Andy Devonshire	Armando Iannucci	Verity Newman	7 February 2004
Armando Iannucci advocates Yes Minister and Yes, Prime Minister, a political satire that premiered on BBC2 in 1980 and its sequel.
6	"One Foot in the Grave"	Rowland Rivron	Elaine Shepherd	Lloyd Stanton	Elaine Shepherd	14 February 2004
Rowland Rivron advocates One Foot in the Grave, a dark comedy about the trials of an elderly curmudgeon and his longsuffering wife. It premiered on BBC1 in 1990.
7	"Porridge"	Johnny Vaughan	Stephen Franklin	Johnny Vaughan, Steve Punt	Stephen Franklin	21 February 2004
Johnny Vaughan advocates BBC1's Porridge (1975–1978), about two men—one middle-aged, the other a young newcomer—serving time in a British prison.
8	"Only Fools and Horses"	David Dickinson	?	?	Gerard Barry	28 February 2004
David Dickinson advocates Only Fools and Horses, which centres on an ambitious Cockney market trader called Del Boy. It premiered on BBC1 in 1981.
9	"Open All Hours"	Clarissa Dickson Wright	Andrew Nicholson	?	Andrew Nicholson	6 March 2004
Clarissa Dickson Wright advocates Open All Hours, which premiered on BBC2 in 1973. It concerns a South Yorkshire shopkeeper and his wistful nephew.
10	"The Vicar of Dibley"	Carol Vorderman	Karina Brennan	Stuart Maconie	Karina Brennan	13 March 2004
Carol Vorderman advocates The Vicar of Dibley, in which Geraldine, the buxom new vicar of a small village in Oxfordshire, lives among a colourful cast of characters there – and encounters some opposition. BBC1 premiered The Vicar of Dibley in 1994.
11	"Dad's Army"	Phill Jupitus	Norman Hull	Andre Vincent, Phil Wilding	Norman Hull	20 March 2004
Phill Jupitus advocates Dad's Army. Set during the Second World War, it introduces viewers to an unlikely group of Home Guard volunteers on England's south coast. The series premiered in 1968 on BBC1.
12	"Live Final"	Jonathan Ross	Alex Hardcastle	Shaun Pye, Jez Stevenson	Alex Hardcastle	27 March 2004
All 10 advocates return for this live finale. Jonathan Ross counts down the top 50 sitcoms once again before announcing which of the finalists received the most votes from viewers.

== The Britain's Best Sitcom Top 100 ==
Top 100 sitcoms
Rank	Title	Years transmitted (as of 2003)	Channel	Number of votes
1	Only Fools and Horses	1981–1996, 2001–2003 (Note: BBC One transmitted "Sleepless in Peckham", the 2003 Christmas special and final episode of Only Fools and Horses, between the first and final rounds of voting.)	BBC1	342,426
2	Blackadder	1983–1989, 1999	BBC1	282,106
3	The Vicar of Dibley	1994–2000 (Note: Britain's Best Sitcom preceded the Vicar of Dibley Christmas and New Year specials transmitted by BBC One in 2004–2007.)	BBC1	212,927
4	Dad's Army	1968–1977	BBC1	174,138
5	Fawlty Towers	1975–1979	BBC2	172,066
6	Yes Minister	1980–1984	BBC2	123,502
6	Yes, Prime Minister	1987–1988	BBC2	123,502
7	Porridge	1974–1977	BBC1	93,902
8	Open All Hours	1976–1985	BBC1	67,237
9	The Good Life	1975–1978	BBC1	40,803
10	One Foot in the Grave	1990–2000	BBC1	31,410
11	Father Ted	1995–1998	Channel 4	Undisclosed
12	Keeping Up Appearances	1990–1995	BBC1	Undisclosed
13	'Allo 'Allo!	1982–1992	BBC1	Undisclosed
14	Last of the Summer Wine	1973–2003 (Note: The first round of voting preceded series 25–31 of Last of the Summer Wine. Series 31 concluded in 2010.)	BBC1	Undisclosed
15	Steptoe and Son	1962–1974	BBC1	Undisclosed
16	Men Behaving Badly	1992–1998	ITV (series 1–2); BBC1 (series 3–7)	Undisclosed
17	Absolutely Fabulous	1992–1996, 2001–2003 (Note: The first round of voting preceded Absolutely Fabulous series 5 (October–December 2003), the 2004 Christmas special, and the 20th Anniversary series (2011–2012).)	BBC1	Undisclosed
18	Red Dwarf	1988–1999 (Note: Britain's Best Sitcom preceded the Red Dwarf revival series and specials transmitted by Dave.)	BBC2	Undisclosed
19	The Royle Family	1998–2000 (Note: Britain's Best Sitcom preceded the five Royle Family specials that BBC One transmitted in 2006–2012.)	BBC1	Undisclosed
20	Are You Being Served?	1972–1985	BBC1	Undisclosed
21	To the Manor Born	1979–1981 (Note: Britain's Best Sitcom preceded the To the Manor Born Christmas special that BBC One transmitted in 2007.)	BBC1	Undisclosed
22	Some Mothers Do 'Ave 'Em	1973–1978	BBC1	Undisclosed
23	The Likely Lads	1964–1966	BBC1	Undisclosed
23	Whatever Happened to the Likely Lads?	1973–1974	BBC2	Undisclosed
24	My Family	2000–2003 (Note: The first round of voting preceded the My Family 2003 Christmas special, as well as series 5–11 and their respective Christmas specials (2004–2011). Since series 11 had no Christmas special, that series' final episode was the programme's send-off.)	BBC1	Undisclosed
25	The Office	2001–2002 (Note: The first round of voting preceded The Office Christmas specials (2003) and The Return of Brent (2013).)	BBC2	Undisclosed
26	Drop the Dead Donkey	1990–1998	Channel 4	Undisclosed
27	Rising Damp	1974–1978	ITV	Undisclosed
28	dinnerladies	1998–2000	BBC1	Undisclosed
29	As Time Goes By	1992–2002 (Note: Britain's Best Sitcom preceded the As Times Goes By reunion specials transmitted by BBC One in 2005.)	BBC1	Undisclosed
30	Hancock's Half Hour	1956–1961	BBC1	Undisclosed
31	The Young Ones	1982–1984	BBC2	Undisclosed
32	Till Death Us Do Part	1965–1975	BBC1	Undisclosed
33	Butterflies	1978–1983	BBC2	Undisclosed
34	The Thin Blue Line	1995–1996	BBC1	Undisclosed
35	The Fall and Rise of Reginald Perrin	1976–1979, 1982	BBC1	Undisclosed
36	Phoenix Nights	2001–2002	Channel 4	Undisclosed
37	Waiting for God	1990–1994	BBC1	Undisclosed
38	Birds of a Feather	1989–1998	BBC1	Undisclosed
39	Bread	1986–1991	BBC1	Undisclosed
40	Hi-de-Hi!	1980–1988	BBC1	Undisclosed
41	The League of Gentlemen	1999–2002	BBC2	Undisclosed
42	I'm Alan Partridge	1997–2002	BBC2	Undisclosed
43	Just Good Friends	1983–1986	BBC1	Undisclosed
44	2point4 children	1991–1999	BBC1	Undisclosed
45	Bottom	1991–1995	BBC2	Undisclosed
46	It Ain't Half Hot Mum	1974–1981	BBC1	Undisclosed
47	The Brittas Empire	1991–1997	BBC1	Undisclosed
48	Gimme Gimme Gimme	1999–2001	BBC2 (series 1); BBC1 (series 2–3)	Undisclosed
49	Rab C. Nesbitt	1988–1999 (Note: Britain's Best Sitcom preceded the Rab C. Nesbitt 2008 Christmas special, as well as series 9–10 (2010–2011) and the New Year special (January 2014).)	BBC2	Undisclosed
50	Goodnight Sweetheart	1993–1999	BBC1	Undisclosed
51	Up Pompeii!	1969–1970, 1975, 1991	BBC1; ITV (1991 special)	Undisclosed
52	Ever Decreasing Circles	1984–1989	BBC1	Undisclosed
53	On the Buses	1969–1973	ITV	Undisclosed
54	Coupling	2000–2002 (Note: Britain's Best Sitcom preceded the fourth series of Coupling, which BBC Three transmitted May–June 2004.)	BBC2	Undisclosed
55	George and Mildred	1976–1979	ITV	Undisclosed
56	A Fine Romance	1981–1984	ITV	Undisclosed
57	Citizen Smith	1977–1980	BBC1	Undisclosed
58	Black Books	2000–2002 (Note: The first round of voting preceded the third series of Black Books, which Channel 4 transmitted March–April 2004.)	Channel 4	Undisclosed
59	The Liver Birds	1969–1996	BBC1	Undisclosed
60	Two Pints of Lager and a Packet of Crisps	2001–2003 (Note: The first round of voting preceded series 4–9 of Two Pints of Lager and a Packet of Crisps. The series concluded in 2011.)	BBC2 (series 1); BBC Choice (series 2); BBC Three (series 3 onward)	Undisclosed
61	The New Statesman	1987–1994	ITV; BBC1 (1994 special)	Undisclosed
62	Sykes	1972–1979	BBC1	Undisclosed
62	Sykes and a...	1960–1965	BBC1	Undisclosed
63	Please Sir!	1968–1972	ITV	Undisclosed
64	Dear John	1986–1987	BBC1	Undisclosed
65	Barbara	1995–2003	ITV	Undisclosed
66	Spaced	1999–2001	Channel 4	Undisclosed
67	Bless This House	1971–1976	ITV	Undisclosed
68	Love Thy Neighbour	1972–1976	ITV	Undisclosed
69	Man About the House	1973–1976	ITV	Undisclosed
70	Desmond's	1989–1994	Channel 4	Undisclosed
71	Duty Free	1984–1986	ITV	Undisclosed
72	All Gas and Gaiters	1966–1971	BBC1	Undisclosed
73	Happy Ever After	1974–1979	BBC1	Undisclosed
73	Terry and June	1979–1987	BBC1	Undisclosed
74	Only When I Laugh	1979–1982	ITV	Undisclosed
75	Brass	1983–1990	ITV	Undisclosed
76	The Rag Trade	1961–1978	BBC1 (series 1–3); ITV (series 4–5)	Undisclosed
77	Sorry!	1981–1988	BBC1	Undisclosed
78	Kiss Me Kate	1998–2000	BBC1	Undisclosed
79	Doctor in the House	1969–1970	ITV	Undisclosed
79	Doctor at Large	1971	ITV	Undisclosed
79	Doctor in Charge	1972–1973	ITV	Undisclosed
79	Doctor at Sea	1974	ITV	Undisclosed
79	Doctor on the Go	1975–1977	ITV	Undisclosed
79	Doctor at the Top	1991	BBC1	Undisclosed
80	I Didn't Know You Cared	1975–1979	BBC1	Undisclosed
81	Shelley	1979–1992	ITV	Undisclosed
82	Nearest and Dearest	1968–1973	ITV	Undisclosed
83	Fresh Fields	1984–1986	ITV	Undisclosed
83	French Fields	1989–1991	ITV	Undisclosed
84	The Army Game	1957–1961	ITV	Undisclosed
85	Robin's Nest	1977–1981	ITV	Undisclosed
86	The Dustbinmen	1969–1970	ITV	Undisclosed
87	Whoops Apocalypse	1982	ITV	Undisclosed
88	My Wife Next Door	1972	BBC1	Undisclosed
89	Never the Twain	1981–1991	ITV	Undisclosed
90	Nightingales	1990–1993	Channel 4	Undisclosed
91	Early Doors	2003 (Note: Britain's Best Sitcom preceded Early Doors series 2, which BBC Two transmitted September–October 2004.)	BBC2	Undisclosed
92	Agony	1979–1981	ITV	Undisclosed
93	The Lovers	1970–1971	ITV	Undisclosed
94	Father, Dear Father	1968–1973	ITV	Undisclosed
95	Hot Metal	1986–1989	ITV	Undisclosed
96	...And Mother Makes Three	1971–1973	ITV	Undisclosed
96	...And Mother Makes Five	1974–1976	ITV	Undisclosed
97	Life with the Lyons	1955–1960	BBC1 / ITV	Undisclosed
98	Marriage Lines	1961–1966	BBC1	Undisclosed
99	A Sharp Intake of Breath	1977–1981	ITV	Undisclosed
100	No Problem!	1983–1985	Channel 4	Undisclosed

== Background ==
Britain's Best Sitcom was BBC Two's third television programme based on nationwide opinion polls between 2002 and 2004. It was preceded by The Big Read (18 October – 13 December 2003) and Great Britons (20 October – 24 November 2002). The Big Read was based on a poll asking for readers' favourite novels; Great Britons was based on the 100 Great Britons poll, which asked members of the public to nominate people who were born in or lived in the British Isles (including Ireland), and who "played a significant part in the life of the British Isles."

All three polls were conducted during the tenure of Jane Root as controller of BBC Two. Root served as the channel's controller (executive director of programming) from 1999 until 2004, when she left the BBC to head Discovery Networks in the United States.

== See also ==
- Great Britons (2002)
- The Big Read (2003)
- Comedy Connections (2003)
- Market research
