= Hugh's Chicken Run =

- Starring: Hugh Fearnley-Whittingstall
- Country of origin: United Kingdom
- Original language: English
- No. of episodes: 6

Original release
- Network: Channel 4
- Release: 7 January – 9 January 2008

Hugh's Chicken Run is a programme as part of Channel 4's 'Food Fight' series in which celebrity chef Hugh Fearnley-Whittingstall launched the campaign to encourage more consumers to demand free range chicken. Fearnley-Whittingstall was joined on the campaign by fellow celebrity chef, Jamie Oliver, who chose to highlight the issues in the more graphic Jamie's Fowl Dinners.

In the series, Fearnley-Whittingstall set about the highlighting the differences in standards by creating his own intensive and free range chicken farms; as well as mentoring a community project in Axminster.

Fearnley-Whittingstall heralded the campaign a success when he managed to get to the point where the majority of the whole fresh chicken consumed in the town of Axminster was free range. Since then, the campaign has gone nationwide with over 128,000 viewers having pledged on the campaign website to only buy free-range products. The programme has been linked with the large rise in free-range products, as well as the drop in demand for intensively reared products during January and February 2008. A poll carried out for the RSPCA, 73% of adults claim that they now only buy birds that have "higher welfare" conditions, such as the RSPCA's freedom food scheme, free range or organic
