= River Cottage =

British food television series brand

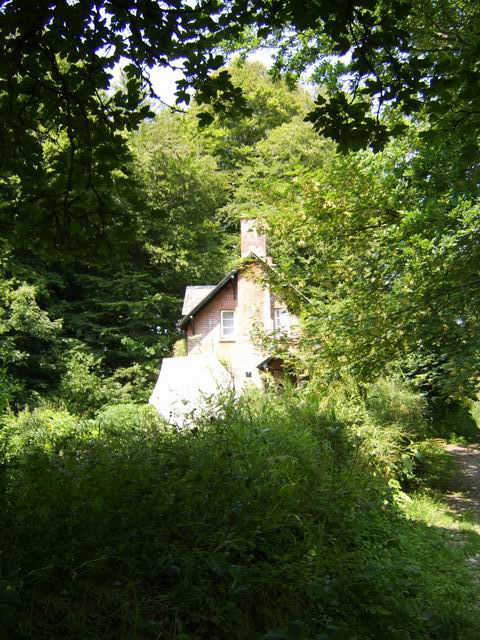
The original River Cottage

River Cottage is a brand used for a number of ventures by television chef Hugh Fearnley-Whittingstall. These include a long-running Channel 4 television series, cookery courses, events, restaurants and products such as beer and organic yogurts.

There is a River Cottage Kitchen restaurant championing organic and local food near Axminster. River Cottage HQ is a 100-acre farm on the Devon/Dorset border that follows the farm-to-fork ethos through its various endeavours. Among other things these include: cookery, gardening and craft courses, long table dining feasts in the 18th-century threshing barn and the 17th-century farmhouse which appeared in many of the later TV shows has recently been renovated to now host guests on a B&B and whole house rental basis. As well as this, River Cottage HQ holds many private events including parties, meetings and weddings.

== Television series ==
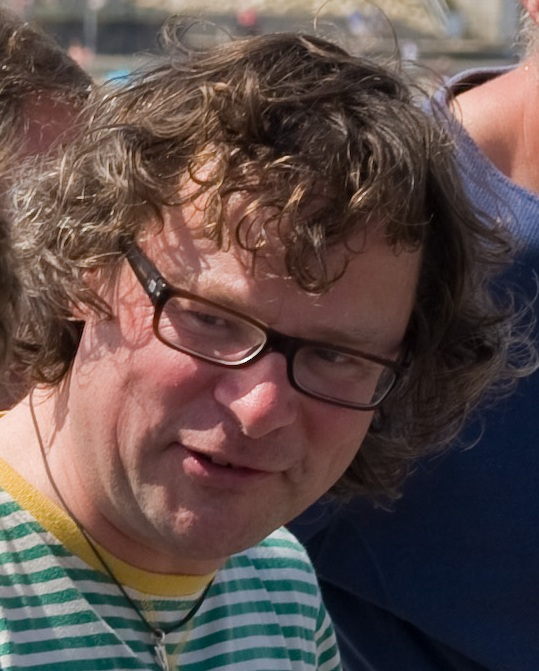
Hugh Fearnley-Whittingstall

The first TV series, Escape to River Cottage, was shown on Channel 4. In this show, Fearnley-Whittingstall left London to pursue an ambition of self-sufficiency, growing his own vegetables and raising his own animals at a gamekeeper's cottage near Netherbury in Dorset. The series had six episodes and first aired in March and April 1999. It was followed by Return to River Cottage in 2000. and River Cottage Forever in 2002, in which viewers followed Fearnley-Whittingstall's further adventures as a downsized smallholder.

In 2004, the River Cottage brand left the original holiday home to follow Fearnley-Whittingstall's progress as he set up a new business from old dairy buildings near Broadoak, Bridport, Dorset in the series Beyond River Cottage. An additional series, The View from River Cottage, was a combination clip show and retrospective of the previous series.

The 2005 series, River Cottage Road Trip, follows Fearnley-Whittingstall as he explores Dumfriesshire, Cumbria and Lozells and East Handsworth, Birmingham for regional recipes that he can bring back home.

In 2006, moved to the Park Farm location near to Uplyme in Devon. Here at the new River Cottage HQ, the team would film the 2006 series The River Cottage Treatment where Fearnley-Whittingstall would attempt to convert junk food lovers' eating habits.

The 2007 series, River Cottage: Gone Fishing, saw Fearnley-Whittingstall travel to fishing locations throughout the British Isles in order to promote the culinary benefits of sustainable fishing cultures.

In 2008, Channel 4 began broadcasting River Cottage Spring, later followed up by River Cottage Autumn, which shows Fearnley-Whittingstall using home-grown produce in recipes. The series also tracks a group of families in Bristol who attempt to convert a large bramble patch into a small-holding, now known as Bramble Farm, growing vegetables, and rearing meat. A four-episode series River Cottage: Summer's Here began airing in June 2009.

November 2009 saw the broadcasting of a new series titled River Cottage: Winter's on the Way, following Fearnley-Whittingstall as he grows, forages and cooks winter treats.

In 2010, a new series titled River Cottage Every Day was released, each episode concerning the specific topics of meat, fish, vegetables, fruit, breakfast, lunch, bread and treats.

During the year 2011 Fearnley-Whittingstall released the series River Cottage Veg, documenting his experiences of giving up meat whilst learning about different vegetarian cooking styles.

In July 2012, a new three-part series began on Channel 4, titled River Cottage: Three Go Mad. Fearnley-Whittingstall was joined at Park Farm by three celebrities, who wished to increase their knowledge on where their food comes from, and how it gets from farm and sea to plate.

In June 2022, a new four-part series titled River Cottage Reunited premiered on More4.

=== Australian adaptation ===
River Cottage Australia is an Australian adaptation of the series. It sees former chef Paul West showcase local produce and farming while attempting to live in a self-sufficient manner. The series premiered in 2013 on The LifeStyle Channel and ran for two seasons before moving to The LifeStyle Channel's sister network LifeStyle Food in 2015.

=== DVD releases ===
Escape to River Cottage DVD cover

DVD name	Released	Audio	Aspect Ratio	Duration	Number of Episodes	Num of Discs
Escape To River Cottage	8 September 2003	Dolby Digital 2.0	4:3 Full Frame	2 hours 48 minutes	6	2
Return To River Cottage	19 April 2004	Dolby Digital 2.0	16:9 Anamorphic	2 hours 28 minutes	6	2
River Cottage Forever	11 October 2004	Dolby Digital 2.0	16:9 Anamorphic	3 hours 42 minutes	8	2
Beyond River Cottage	17 October 2005	Dolby Digital 2.0	16:9 Anamorphic	4 hours 40 minutes	10	3
River Cottage Road Trip	2 October 2006	Dolby Digital 2.0	16:9 Anamorphic	2 hours 5 minutes	2	1
River Cottage: Gone Fishing!	3 December 2007	Dolby Digital 2.0	16:9 Anamorphic	2 hours 22 minutes	3	1
River Cottage: Spring	27 October 2008	Dolby Digital 2.0	16:9 Anamorphic	3 hours 7 minutes	4	1
River Cottage: Autumn	12 October 2009	Dolby Digital 2.0	16:9 Anamorphic	3 hours 11 minutes	4	1
River Cottage: Summer's Here	1 August 2011	Dolby Digital 2.0	16:9 Anamorphic	3 hours 5 minutes	4	1
River Cottage: Winter's on the Way	17 October 2011	Dolby Digital 2.0	16:9 Anamorphic	3 hours 12 minutes	4	1

These DVDs are distributed by Channel 4 DVD.

== Books ==
A number of books have been produced to tie in with the series including:

- The River Cottage Cookbook
- River Cottage Year
- River Cottage Meat Book
- River Cottage Family Cookbook
- River Cottage Fish Book
- River Cottage Every Day
- River Cottage Veg Every Day
- River Cottage Fruit Every Day
- River Cottage Light & Easy

== Locations of TV shows and other ventures ==
=== The original River Cottage ===
The original River Cottage was a former weekend and holiday home, previously a gamekeeper's lodge in the grounds of Slape Manor, Netherbury, Dorset. This was used as the location for series 1-3 of the TV show.

=== River Cottage HQ ===
The original River Cottage HQ (RCHQ) was near Broadoak, Bridport in Dorset and was home to the fourth TV series, Beyond River Cottage, which was based around the new project to develop the rural education centre in some old dairy buildings.

The RCHQ ran courses and activities celebrating and teaching the skills and values that Whittingstall learned in his five years as a Dorset smallholder. It focused in particular upon cooking in tune with the seasons, small scale local food production, and adding value to home grown produce for taking to local markets. The courses and events were hosted by different members of the River Cottage team, including some from the television series including Ray Smith (a freelance butcher) and Michael Michaud an organic polytunnel expert.

In September 2006 River Cottage HQ moved to a new, larger, location.

=== River Cottage HQ (Park Farm) ===
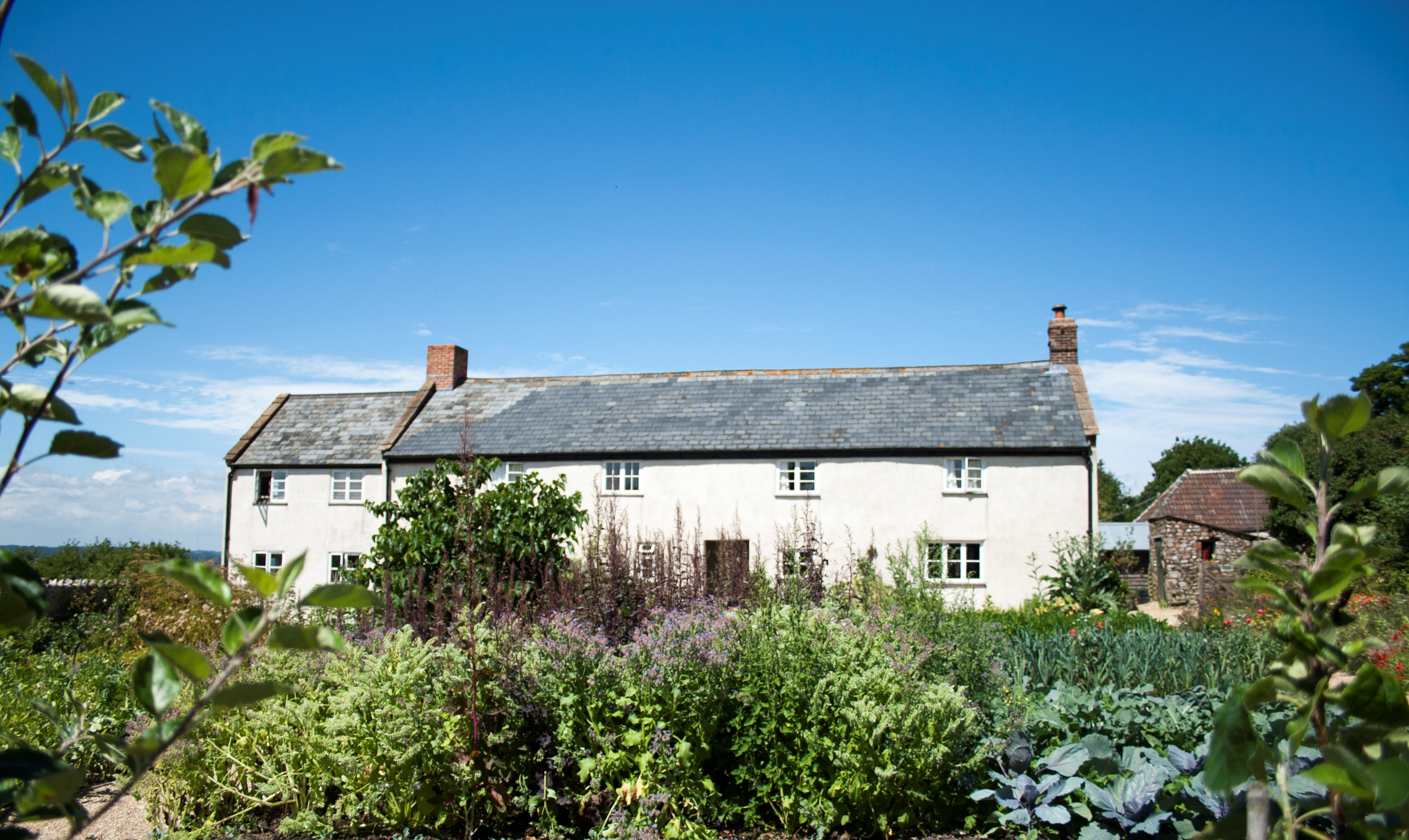
The River Cottage HQ kitchen garden and farmhouse.

In 2006, the show moved to a new location, also called River Cottage HQ, near the village of Musbury in East Devon. Cradled in the Axe Valley on the Devon/Dorset border, the second River Cottage HQ (known as Park Farm) is a 17th-century farmhouse, converted barns and 66 acres (270,000 m^{2}) of land.

River Cottage HQ provides dining experiences in the 18th-century threshing barn; cookery, craft and gardening courses covering a wide variety of topics including bee-keeping, breadmaking, cheese-making, curing meat and foraging; accommodation for guests to stay in the 17th-century farmhouse on a B&B or exclusive use basis following its renovation in early 2019; and hosts a number of private events each year including parties, meetings and weddings.

In early February 2012, River Cottage's events barn was largely destroyed by a fire. It has since been rebuilt.

=== Other business ventures ===
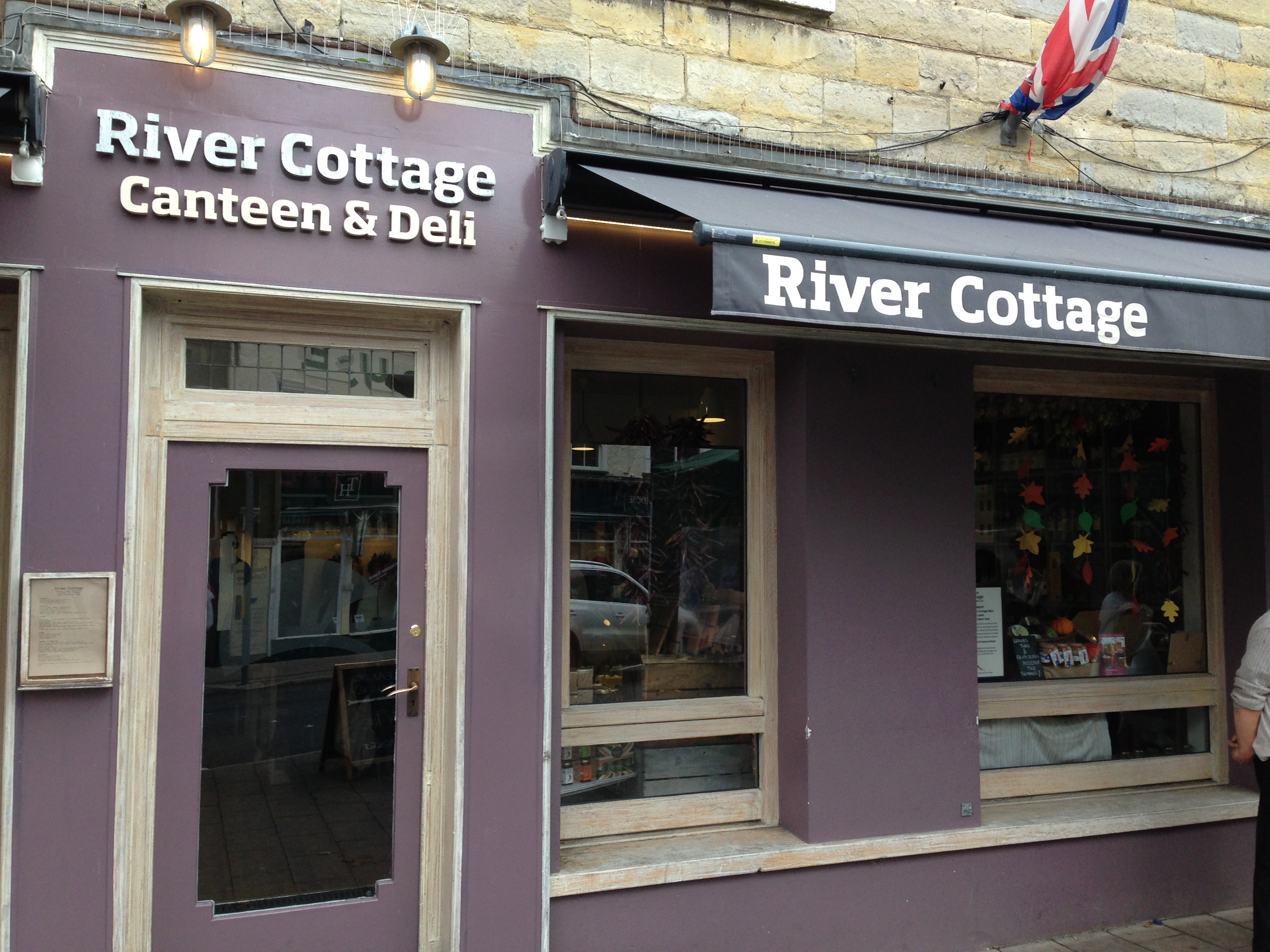
River Cottage Canteen & Deli in Trinity Square, Axminster, 2013

In 2007 the River Cottage team opened the River Cottage local produce store & canteen, a local produce shop and informal restaurant in Trinity Square, Axminster, in a building that formerly housed the town's ballroom. In September 2010 a deli counter was introduced and this venue was renamed the River Cottage Canteen & Deli.

In April 2009, a second Canteen was opened in Bath at a city-centre comedy venue called Komedia. In 2011 this canteen was sold back to Komedia and although it continued to trade as a canteen it stopped using the River Cottage branding. Shortly after this, in November 2011, another River Cottage Canteen and Deli was opened in Plymouth, in the historic Royal William Yard. In March 2013, a third canteen was opened in Bristol and a fourth canteen opened in Winchester in September 2014. These three restaurants have now all closed: Plymouth in May 2017, Bristol in March 2020 and Winchester in July 2020.

Some time between 2014 and 2017 the River Cottage Canteen & Deli name was rebranded to River Cottage Kitchen & Deli. The Kitchen & Deli in Axminster town centre closed permanently in February 2022 and the River Cottage Kitchen was opened near Axminster at Park Farm, the River Cottage HQ, in April 2022. The River Cottage Kitchen serves an all-day menu, based at the River Cottage HQ.
