= Beyond River Cottage =

- Created by: Hugh Fearnley-Whittingstall
- Starring: Hugh Fearnley-Whittingstall
- Country of origin: United Kingdom
- Original language: English
- No. of episodes: 10

Production
- Executive producer: Andrew Palmer
- Producer: Jacky Sloane
- Running time: 30 minutes (with commercials)

Original release
- Network: Channel 4
- Release: 1 October – 3 December 2004

Beyond River Cottage is the fourth series of the Channel 4 programme that follows Hugh Fearnley-Whittingstall as he pursues the ideal of rural self-sufficiency as a farm-owner in Dorset.

== Show summary ==
This series begins five years after Fearnley-Whittingstall first left the city and moved to River Cottage. With a growing family, Fearnley-Whittingstall, his wife, and their two young sons, move to a 44-acre (180,000 m^{2}) farm, which is ten times larger than the original River Cottage property. Fearnley-Whittingstall also buys an old dairy farm and—over the course of the series—renovates its buildings into "River Cottage H.Q.", a small of kitchen, café restaurant and centre teaching people how to cook.

== List of episodes ==
Ep.	Air Date	Summary
1	1 October 2004	Fearnley-Whittingstall moves to a new farm with a far larger number of animals to care for. This includes eight cows, which Fearnley-Whittingstall and his veterinarian colleague check for pregnancy. Later Fearnley-Whittingstall goes fishing and brings home a bounty of sea bass. Fearnley-Whittingstall inspects several locations in search of a site for River Cottage H.Q. before settling on a nearby dairy farm. Fearnley-Whittingstall briefs Michael Michaud on his ambitious plan of transforming the cow stalls into planting beds and growing a garden directly off the leftover cow dung. As demolition work begins, Fearnley-Whittingstall constructs a makeshift barbecue on the site and cooks lunch for the workers: spicy sea bass fillets in foil pouches.
2	8 October 2004	Fearnley-Whittingstall's invited 50 of his friends to a Valentine's dinner at River Cottage H.Q., which gives him only two weeks to transform a manure-encrusted barn into a working kitchen and dining room. Later, Fearnley-Whittingstall visits an oyster farm and takes his sheep's skins to a tannery, where they are transformed into rustic seat coverings for his dining room. Fearnley-Whittingstall serves his guests a romantic Valentine's dinner of nettle soup with oysters, beef or hogget hearts and tongues prepared as a papricaş.
3	15 October 2004	Fearnley-Whittingstall can't open River Cottage H.Q. until he installs a loo. He learns how to treat wastewater with ponds of reed and willow plants. Fearnley-Whittingstall experiences a Native-American-style sweat lodge followed by a chilly dip in the ocean and warming Bull Shots he's made with beef stock and vodka. Then Fearnley-Whittingstall partners with local farmers to sell purple-sprouting broccoli and blue cheese at the Bristol farmer's market.
4	22 October 2004	Fearnley-Whittingstall sells waffle breakfast to Morris dancers at a festival. Then he sets about open River Cottage H.Q. to paying customers, and for opening night he wants to serve up a giant lobster. However, his giant trap catches only a conger eel. Fearnley-Whittingstall poaches the eel in a court-bouillon, and deems it appealing enough to serve alongside smaller lobsters which he's purchased from a local fisherman. He also serves roast beef sirloin and fresh asparagus, which had been harvested only an hour earlier and delivered by motorbike.
5	29 October 2004	Fearnley-Whittingstall constructs new polytunnels and plans the year's plantings. Then, Fearnley-Whittingstall joins John Wright, a mushroom hunter, as they search out morels growing in suburban flowerbeds. Fearnley-Whittingstall makes a chicken and morel mousse, which he takes to a picnic gourmet competition. Then he sets up a potted orchard at River Cottage H.Q. and learns to hand knead and shape bread at a bakery in Bridport.
6	5 November 2004	Ken, a local bee keeper teaches Fearnley-Whittingstall to set up his own hive and captures a rogue swarm which he relocates to Fearnley-Whittingstall's farm. Mark and Candida, fellow downshifted smallholders, ask Fearnley-Whittingstall to host their wedding. For the feast, Fearnley-Whittingstall stalks, shoots and spit roasts a roe deer. He makes a pâté from the liver while Gill makes other dishes. The bride and groom pitch in, gathering gooseberries and fishing for trout. The wedding cakes comes in the form of a three-tiered pavlova.
7	12 November 2004	At his family farm, Fearnley-Whittingstall buys a gaggle of geese and ducks. It's the height of summer, and Fearnley-Whittingstall meets up with fisherman friend John as they sell whelks to tourists on the beach at Lyme Regis. Fearnley-Whittingstall invents an Asian-inspired whelk dish with an aromatic salsa. Then he and John participate in a wheeled race around the town's pubs. At River Cottage H.Q., Fearnley-Whittingstall holds a tomato festival. The festival-goers sample Fearnley-Whittingstall 's panzanella and Gill's tomato ice cream, and Fearnley-Whittingstall competes against Ray the butcher, Michael Michaud and Barbara Gunning in a ketchup competition.
8	19 November 2004	Fearnley-Whittingstall harvests his first honey and samples mead. At a bee keeper's show, Fearnley-Whittingstall's honey wins first prize, though his honey-based fudge and cake don't fare as well. Fearnley-Whittingstall attempts to convert the public to eating tripe, which he sells stewed with beans at market. To relieve stress, Fearnley-Whittingstall visits Eleanor, a herbal healer.
9	26 November 2004	Fearnley-Whittingstall commissions Tim, a potter, to produce chicken bricks, traditional ceramic jugs used for cooking chicken. Tim fires his Japanese-style kiln on Guy Fawkes Night, and helps turns the process into a pizza party. Fearnley-Whittingstall provides wood-fired pizzas with buffalo mozzarella made fresh in Devon. Fearnley-Whittingstall and John the mushroom hunter hatch a madcap plan to search for mushrooms by paraglider, and they eventually discover some delicious parasol mushrooms.
10	3 December 2004	In this hour-long special titled "A River Cottage Christmas Feast", Fearnley-Whittingstall prepares a gluttonous ten-bird roast: a woodcock in a partridge in a pigeon in a pheasant in a guineafowl in a mallard in a chicken in an Aylesbury duck in a goose in a turkey. He also makes a flourless-cake for the hunters that shoot down the various birds he requires. Fearnley-Whittingstall also learns how to build a smoker and makes sausage baubles for the Christmas tree. Then he joins the cider circle for some mulled cider and wassailing in the orchard. The River Cottage H.Q. team is treated to a day of squid fishing. Finally, all of Fearnley-Whittingstall's friends join him in the medieval-themed feast.
