= Tilba, New South Wales =

Central Tilba
- Town
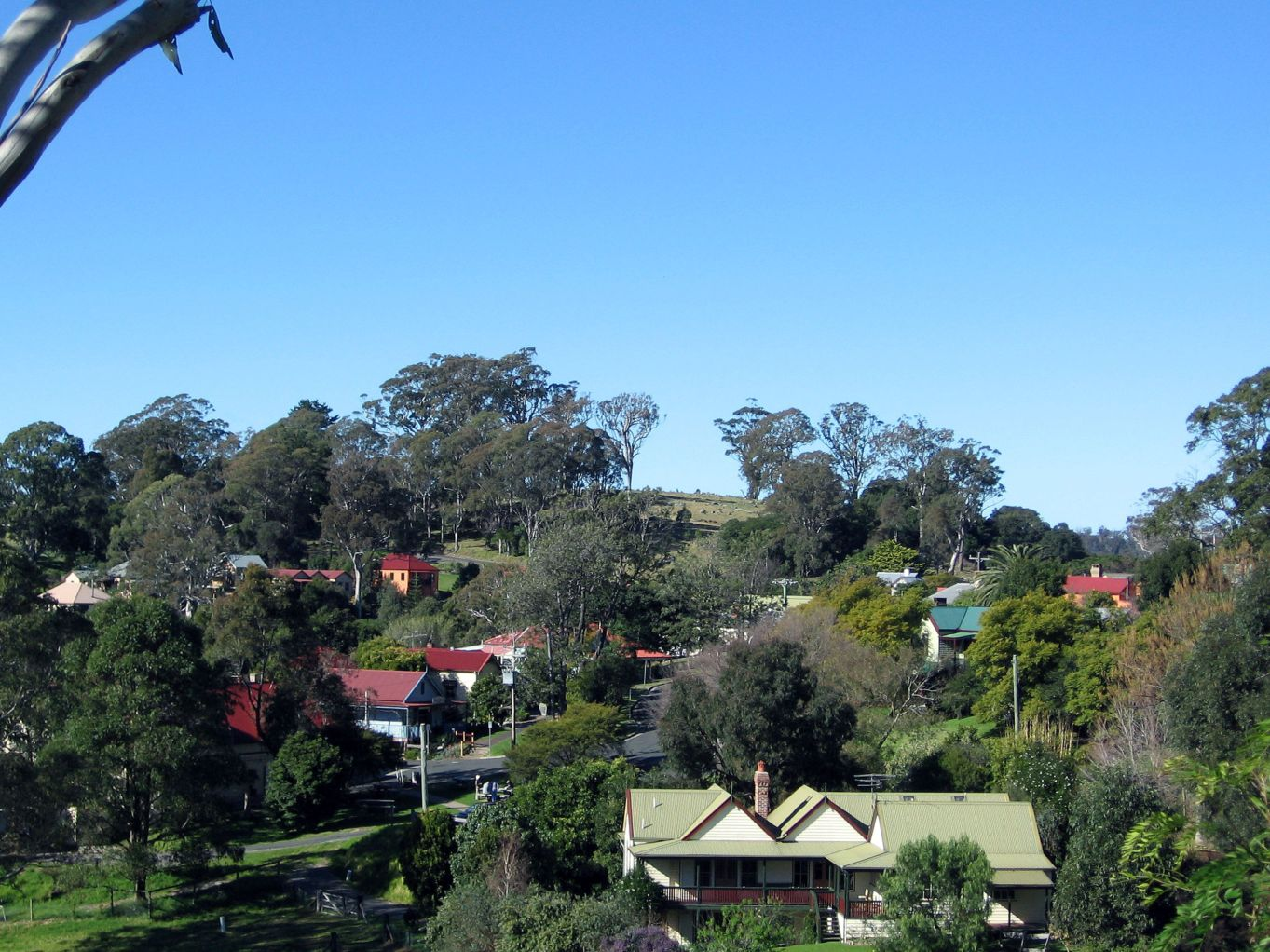
- A view of Central Tilba

- Coordinates: 36°19′S 150°04′E
- Country: Australia
- State: New South Wales
- LGA: Eurobodalla Shire

Government
  - State electorate: Bega
  - Federal division: Eden-Monaro

Population
  - Total: 342 (SAL 2021)
- Postcode: 2546

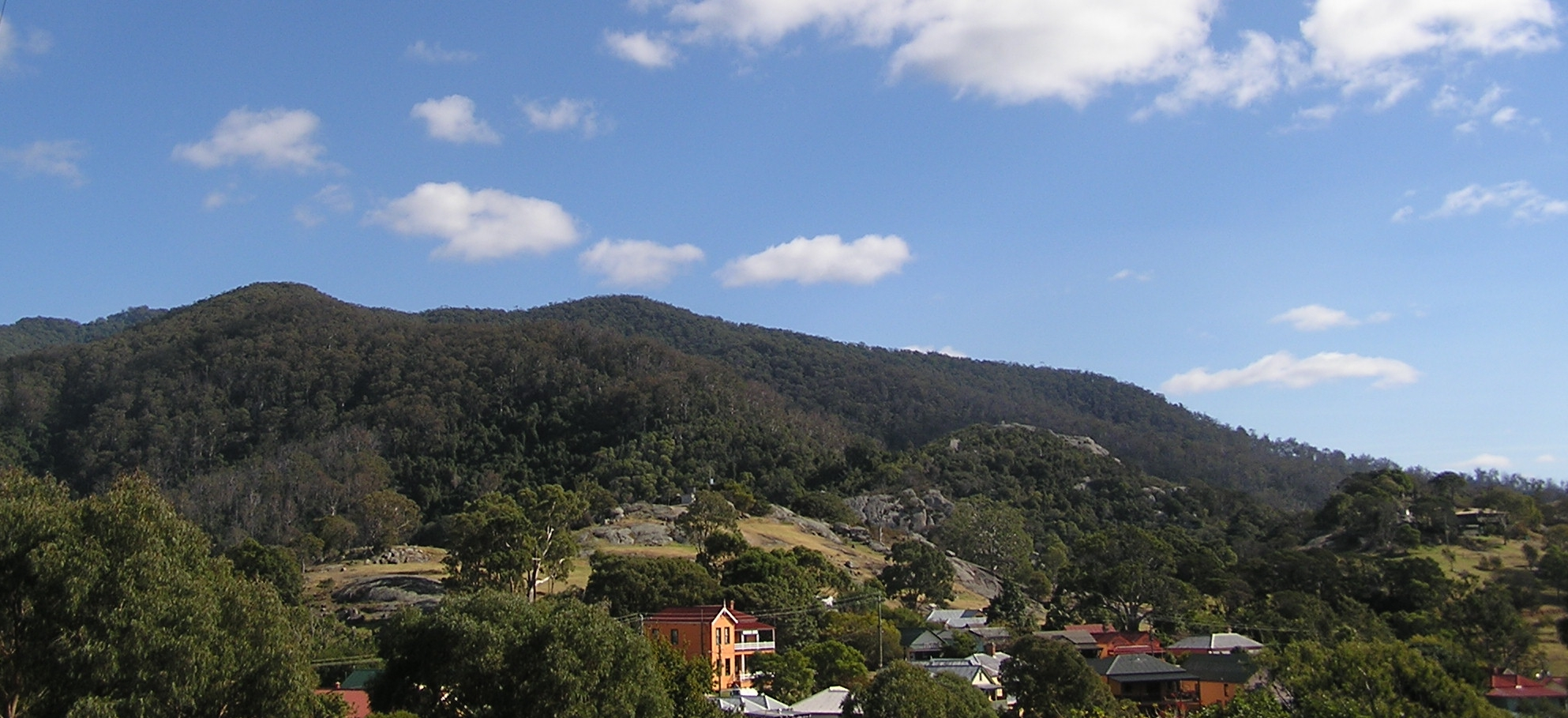
Gulaga and Central Tilba

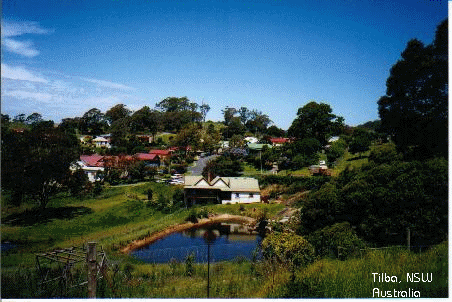
Tilba, New South Wales.

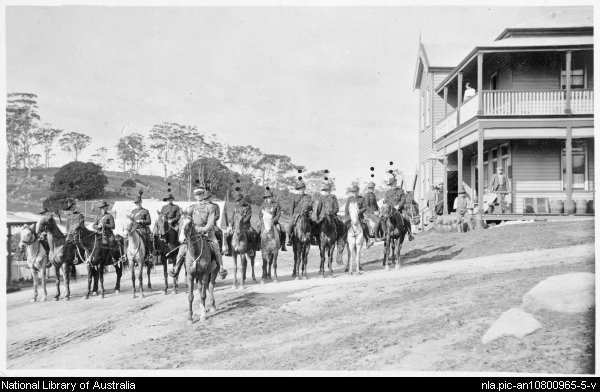
Tilba Rifle Brigade approx 1904–1906 Clem Bate officer in front. Taken in Main Street of Central Tilba

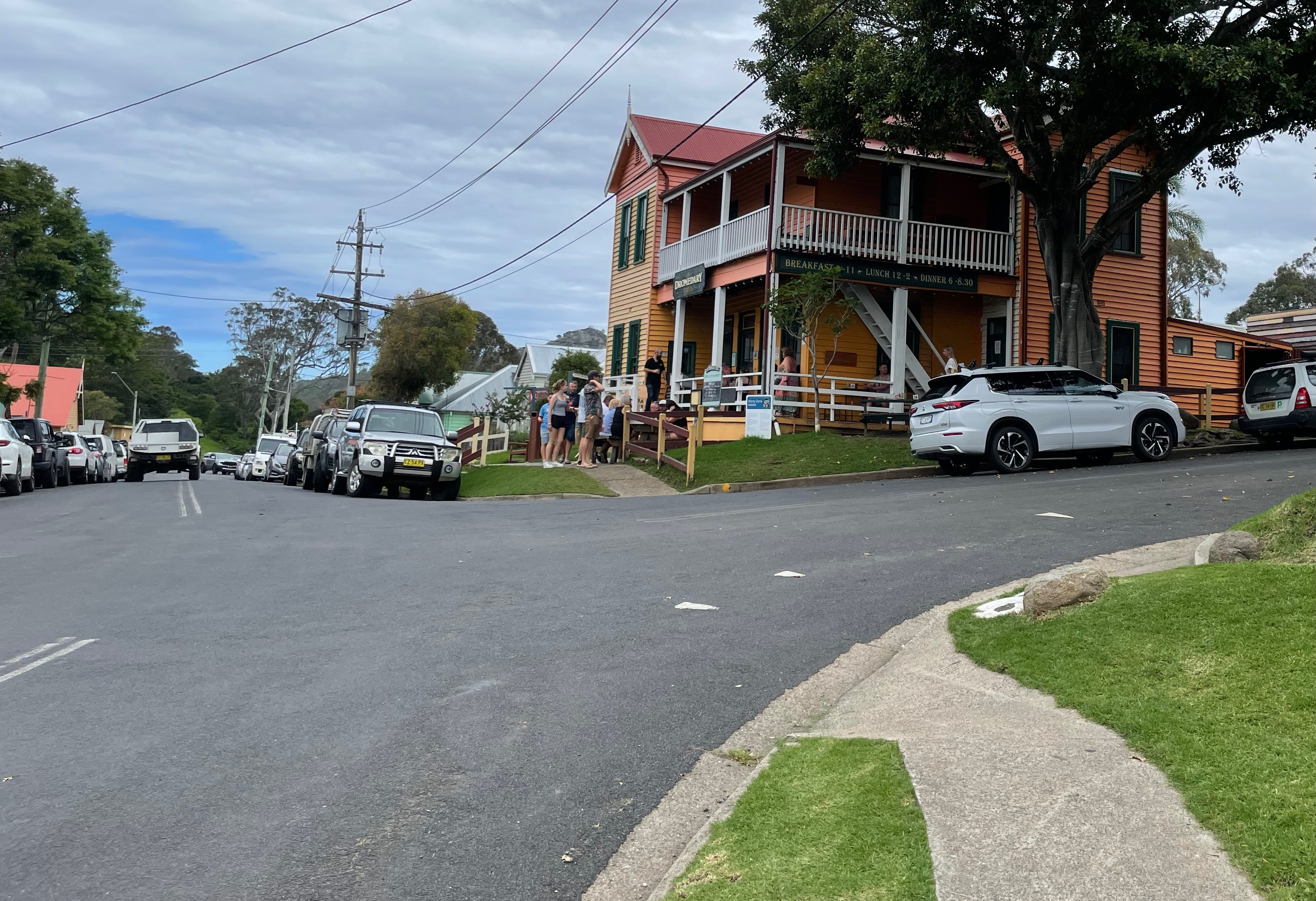
The Dromedary Hotel in 2024 (before 1936 it was called The Palace Hotel) Bate Street, Tilba

Central Tilba and Tilba Tilba are two villages near the Princes Highway in Eurobodalla Shire, New South Wales, Australia. At the 2021 census, Central Tilba and surrounding areas had a population of 342 (Tilba Tilba had 102).

Central Tilba is located around 10 kilometres (6 mi) south south west of Narooma and is 60 kilometres (37 mi) north of Bega. The entire village is classified by the National Trust as the Central Tilba Conservation Area.

Behind the towns sits Gulaga / Mount Dromedary, an extinct volcano which created the geological composition of the area, including the nearby Najanuka/Little Dromedary Mountain to the south.

== History ==
The area was originally inhabited by the Yuin people, an Aboriginal nation. Tilba Tilba is the original name of the district, and is said to mean "many waters" in the Thawa language.

'Henry Jefferson Bate, the first resident selector, arrived in 1869 and occupied a block called Mountain View near the site of the village of Tilba Tilba.' The town was settled during the Australian gold rushes of the nineteenth century, and was the home town of the Bate family, of political renown. Until August 1990 the Princes Highway passed through Tilba when a bypass opened.

=== Gold on the mountain ===
Gold was discovered on and in the mountain. By 1876, "in one creek over £10,000 of gold had been obtained, and constant employment is given to several miners."

A visitor in 1878 said "There is no doubt that gold is in plenty. It is won with comparative facility, no blasting being required, and the expense of timbering being more than compensated by the ease and rapidity with which the driving [tunnelling] can be carried on and much of the gold extracted."

Gold mining in 1896 was mainly by tunnelling and mechanical stamping. "Five tunnels have been driven in, one under the other. The longest is No. 5 tunnel, which has been driven over 700 ft [200m] into the mountain side. About a dozen men are working in the mine. The battery stands in a little gully below, and the stone is sent down to it in shutes.' 'At the foot of the mountain a few Chinamen are sluicing in the bed of the creek."

In 1901 it was reported "The Dromedary mines are still producing small but regular quantities of the precious metal. Although the streak is about the smallest worked in the colony, it is of such good grade that profit is made."

In February 1911, the New Mount Dromedary Company mine closed down.

=== The district ===
A visitor in 1876 described "the beautiful district known as Tilba Tilba, than which there can be no climate more salubrious nor scenery more beautiful. The soil is good, and some large dairies are being formed the land is being rapidly taken up, and doubtless in very few years the export which now consist principally of butter, cheese, and bacon, will be considerably increased. Bermagui is the shipping part for the district embracing Tilba, and it is very easy of access."

In 1891, in Tilba Tilba the brothers Sam and Henry Bate, had an argument about how to develop the town. Sam disagreed with his brother and so, 3 kilometres up the mountain, established Central Tilba.

By 1896, there was a bridge across the Wallaga Lake linking Tilba to Bermagui to which the Illawarra Steam Navigation Company ran four services a week. At that time the mail service ran every day except Sunday from Sydney by train to Tarago (east of Lake George), then by stagecoach via Braidwood, Araluen, and the Deua River valley to Moruya then Tilba and on to Bega.

A traveller at that time said 'we come to Tilba Tilba, a perfect little gem in the wildest and most rugged setting. It is quite impossible to convey in words any adequate idea of the wildly picturesque romantic beauty of this fertile little spot. It must be seen to be properly appreciated, and I would strongly recommend some of those who are eternally bewailing the monotony of Australian life and scenery to go to Tilba Tilba, and stop there for the rest of their natural lives.'

== The ABC Cheese Factory ==
The ABC Cheese Factory in Central Tilba, was the first co-operative cheese factory in NSW.

In July 1891, 320 shares were issued at 2s 6d each (£40). The cost of plant was £268. ABC was in operation from September 1891 until 2006 and it remains a local attraction.

In 1892, half the shares had been taken up and the 450 gallons of milk was processed. The Moruya Examiner reported "The ABC Dairy Factory has settled down to its work...as proof of the popularity of which this brand has attained, we append an extract from the report of the manager of the South Coast & West Camden Co. ‘Cheese market improving…We received 45 [crates] of your cheese today, all sold…Can do with double quantity next boat."

1894: In the financial year ending 6 March 1894, the factory processed 219,000 gallons (0.8 of a megalitre) of milk producing 228,000 (~100 tonnes) of cheese. Gross revenue was £2,994 9s 8d. After deducting cost of manufacture, freight, commission, repairs and additions to plant, secretary's salary and sundry expenses, the suppliers received £2,114 8s.

1904: 265,000 gallons of milk were treated. Gross revenue from cheese was £5,841. The suppliers received £4,618. At this time there were 15 holdings and 800 cows. Farmers received £300+ from the Co-op, aside from revenue from pigs, poultry, calves and other stock which was estimated to be worth £100 each year.

1905: 313,000 gallons of milk were treated. Gross revenue from cheese was £7,119 18s 8d. The suppliers received £5,581 17s 10d.

1907: The factory was supplied by 16 dairies within a radius of three miles (5 km). One farm on 230 acres (93 ha) with a herd of 60 cows had a turnover of £998 of which £700 was from milk, the balance from pigs and other produce.

In 1917 and 1918 the quantity of milk processed (250,000 gallons every six months) and the return to farmers were at record highs.

1922: A shock came in December 1922, when the NSW Department of Agriculture condemned the ABC and Tilba Tilba cheese factories. The ABC was given until May 1924, to erect an up-to-date building, with an adequate water supply. The decision lashed Tilba into a fury. But, said an observer, improvements were needed. Although the quantity of milk being processed had increased significantly over the last 16 years, the ABC had been using the same scales. The observer saw a long row of waiting waggonettes with their bright milk cans standing in the hot sun, the contents deteriorating all the time on account of the slowness of the weighing and receiving methods.

Tenders were called in June 1924 and building was underway by August. By mid 1925 the new factory was complete at a cost of £4,364, while £603 was expended on plant and machinery. It was pronounced equal to anything of the kind in the State. In that year, 78 crates of ABC cheese were sold in London for £104 – topping the market. Foley Bros, the company's Sydney agents, said the ABC cheese was ‘always of excellent quality’.

1980: The drought of 1980 cut production at the ABC to a quarter of normal. Instead of 18,000 litres a day and four vats of cheese, the factory was handling only 2,300 litres and producing only one vat of cheese.

1981: The Bega Dairy Cooperative announced that it would close the ABC factory with its five employees on 21 March. BDC said the closure was due to a lack of milk due to an increase in the liquid-milk market and to the smallness of the factory. In December 1981, Geoff and Catherine Bryan announced they had bought the factory and it would re-open in February 1982.

The Tilba Factory was purchased in 2012 by two local dairy farmers who installed new cheese-making and milk-bottling equipment, bringing back the tradition of dairy manufacture to the Tilba area. The milk bottled and cheese made on site are from two local dairy farms, one in Tilba one in Cobargo. In 2006 there were 19 locals employed at the Tilba Factory, where they were producing award-winning cheese, yoghurt, milk and cream made from jersey milk. As of 2021 the business is called Tilba Real Dairy.

== From the ABC Coffee Palace to the Dromedary Hotel ==
Today's Hotel was constructed in 1895 for Jim and Emma Livingstone (née Southam). It is said that it was built from wood recycled from the ships that docked at Bermagui harbour. The building opened for business as the ABC Coffee Palace.

Several times Mr Priddle, by then the owner, applied to the Moruya Licensing Court, for a Publican's licence for the premises. At the third attempt on Tuesday 3 October 1899, he was successful. In his successful application, Priddle said The Coffee Palace did not pay, and the shareholders had sold out. He said the building was on the main south coast road and had recently been renovated. He reported that the building has 12 rooms, an 8-stall stable, and 2 water closets.

From that date, the licence of the Palace Hotel changed hands frequently. In 1924 the Yass Courier said the hotel has probably changed hands more than any other hotel on the coast.

In 1901 Priddle sold out to Mr G Kelly In 1903 the licence was held by Frank Sceats. In 1904 the licensee was E C Simmons. In 1911, the licence was transferred to William Livingstone. In November 1911, Livingstone returned to farming and sold the licence to H E Townsend. By December 1914, the licence was held by Horace Gibb. In 1915 the business was purchased by A E Pauling. In 1919, the licensee was Mrs Hogan. In that year, she sold the business to Andrew Hogg. In 1921 the licensee was Arthur L W Leslie. who sold it that year to J Turnbull. In 1923 Turnbull sold it to S Turnbull (no relation). The next year Mr Moran took over. In 1924 it was bought by Mr Livingstone who it was rumoured was planning to move and extend the building to a frontage on what was now being called the Princes Highway. (He did neither.) In 1927 W J Donnelly bought the licence from Mrs Speight. In 1931 Donnelly sold the business to Ben Sutherland.

In 1934, the Licences Reduction Board gave notice that the licence would be surrendered and that the hotel would cease trading on 1 July 1935.

Then news came that 'for some unknown reason', the hotel had been granted a new licence to be held by Leo Lynch. In August 1935, it was announced that the Hotel would be renovated, hot and cold water and a septic tank would be installed and the name changed to the Dromedary. Readers will agree, said the Cobargo Chronicle, that this is quite a suitable name.

In June 1936, the hotel was 'relit' with electricity.

== In popular culture ==
Tilba is the site for the television series: River Cottage Australia.
