= Return to River Cottage =

- Created by: Hugh Fearnley-Whittingstall
- Starring: Hugh Fearnley-Whittingstall
- Country of origin: United Kingdom
- Original language: English
- No. of episodes: 6

Production
- Executive producer: Nick Powell
- Producer: Richard Ellingham
- Running time: 30 minutes (with commercials)

Original release
- Network: Channel 4
- Release: 14 January – 18 February 2000

Return to River Cottage is the second series of the Channel 4 programme that follows Hugh Fearnley-Whittingstall during his second year of living in the country at River Cottage, Dorset after leaving the city behind. The preceding series was Escape to River Cottage.

== Show summary ==
In this series, Fearnley-Whittingstall turns his smallholding into a real home farm and edges a little closer to self-sufficiency. He also explores some of the local traditions and continues to meet the residents of Dorset.

== List of episodes ==
Ep.	Air Date	Summary
1	14 January 2000	It's April, one year since Fearnley-Whittingstall moved to River Cottage. He negotiates with his neighbour to secure the use of a four and a half acre (18,200 m^{2}) field, just enough to support a cow called Marge and her calf, a steer of beef and a small flock of Dorset Down sheep. The cattle are joined by Fearnley-Whittingstall's chickens, which he introduces to high-rise living, and three "Spice" pigs which he names Ginger, Baby and Fat. Fearnley-Whittingstall takes part in a pub's annual raw nettle-eating competition and makes nettle gnocchi. He also goes scallop-diving, making tortillias and prepares a soup of wild watercress and wild garlic foraged from his newly acquired field.
2	21 January 2000	Two of Fearnley-Whittingstall's chickens aren't acclimating to their 8-foot (2.4 m)-high coop, so he sells them at the annual poultry auction and buys three new birds. Fearnley-Whittingstall prepares a fruit fool with fresh gooseberry, elderflower and Marge's cream. Fearnley-Whittingstall calls in veterinarian Jeff Johnson to castrate his bull calf, then they enjoy the testicles on toast with sage leaves. Michael Michaud helps Fearnley-Whittingstall plant tomatoes in his newly constructed polytunnel. Finally, Fearnley-Whittingstall joins gamekeepers to hunt rabbit, then he sells bunny burgers and spicy rabbit satay at a farmer's market.
3	28 January 2000	Fearnley-Whittingstall's landlords the Hitches are hosting a medieval fair, and he offers up one of his pigs for spit roasting. Fearnley-Whittingstall attempts to breed Marge the cow with a bull named Regulus. Fearnley-Whittingstall participates in traditional mackerel-netting at Chesel Beach, then preserves his share of the catch as a gravlax and cooks mackerel boiled in seawater . A Kiwi sheep-shearer teaches Fearnley-Whittingstall to shear his ewes for summer. Then, Fearnley-Whittingstall has his local bakery prepare lardy cakes using the fat from his pig. Barbara Gunning helps Fearnley-Whittingstall roast the pig, whose succulent meat is served on rolls at the fair. Finally, the River Cottage team loses at tug of war, sending Fearnley-Whittingstall flying into the moat, to the delight of all.
4	4 February 2000	Unseasonal rains flatten Fearnley-Whittingstall's potential hay crop, and the tomatoes in his polytunnel are stricken by blight. Sheep shower Joanna helps Fearnley-Whittingstall groom one of his sheep—coincidentally also called Joanna—for competition in a show. Fearnley-Whittingstall joins Nick and Paddy to forage for a full dinner of wild garlic, pigeon, and Chicken of the Woods stuffed in a 6-pound giant puffball. Fearnley-Whittingstall next traps signal crayfish in his river, and prepares a leg of lamb in hay. At the livestock show, Fearnley-Whittingstall's sheep wins second prize.
5	11 February 2000	The tomato crop has survived the blight, and Fearnley-Whittingstall prepares to take on organic grower Michael Michaud in a friendly competition at the farmer's market. Fearnley-Whittingstall turns his tomatoes into a variety of upmarket products including ketchup, tomato and apple jelly, and samosas stuffed with green tomato and pumpkin. Fearnley-Whittingstall enlists Trish, a graphic artist, to design labels for his new brand, The River Cottage Glutton. Meanwhile, Fearnley-Whittingstall fears his "Spice" pigs may have been targeted by a horny wild boar, so he sets up a whimsical tripwire alarm system around the pig pen. Victor Borge the ham expert returns to sample the dry-cured ham from last year. To thank Trish, Fearnley-Whittingstall invites her for a dinner of Lobster Thermidor. At the farmer's market, Fearnley-Whittingstall's strategy of selling prepared foods proves successful.
6	18 February 2000	Fearnley-Whittingstall tries brewing his own beer, using a hop plant he's found growing atop a tree. Later, he employs Nigel, an expert in hedge laying, to tame the trees behind the cottage. In exchange for a few bales of hay, Fearnley-Whittingstall acts as the quarry in a bloodhound hunt. Finding that too exhausting, Fearnley-Whittingstall decides to hold a "bring-a-bale" party to shore up his supply of hay for the winter. He cooks a Moroccan tajine with lamb, and Ray Smith the butcher prepares steaks from Hugh's steer, which they eat with fresh horseradish sauce. The series closes with Fearnley-Whittingstall's party, as he's joined everyone who has helped him over the past year.
