= Garry John Hughes =

British television director (born 1959)

Garry John Hughes (born October 22, 1959, in Radstock, Somerset, UK) is an English TV director and producer. His documentaries include ‘The Ball Is Round’ (1994), ‘Osmond Family Values' (1997), ‘Seeking Pleasure – Holidays’ (1998) ‘Prince Eddy – The King We Never Had’ (2005) and ‘The Great British Black Invasion’ (2006).

Series Hughes has contributed to include 'The Travel Show' (1994–1999), 'Football, Fussbal, Voetbal' (1995), 'If You Can't Stand The Heat' (1999), and 'River Cottage Forever'(2002). In 2007, Hughes series produced a seven part history of British Cinema for BBC2, entitled ‘British Film Forever'.
