= River Cottage: Gone Fishing =

- Starring: Hugh Fearnley-Whittingstall
- Country of origin: United Kingdom
- Original language: English
- No. of episodes: 3

Production
- Executive producer: Andrew Palmer

Original release
- Network: Channel 4
- Release: 8 November – 22 November 2007

River Cottage: Gone Fishing is a Channel 4 programme that follows Hugh Fearnley-Whittingstall as he explores more sustainable fishing methods in the Channel Islands, Scotland and back the West Country. Fearnley-Whittingstall's goal is to encourage people to eat greater varieties of fish and shellfish.

== List of episodes ==
| Ep. | Air Date | Summary |
|---|---|---|
| 1 | 8 November 2007 | Fearnley-Whittingstall leaves his home base of River Cottage and travels to the Channel Islands with two friends to source for fish less known to the British palate. They find species like Garfish and meet new contacts that introduce them to seaside snacks like Limpets. |
| 2 | 15 November 2007 | Fearnley-Whittingstall continues his fishing tour by heading to the Hebrides, cooking up sustainable salmon, diving for Razor clams and pitching pollack versus cod in a Fish and Chip shop. |
| 3 | 22 November 2007 | Fearnley-Whittingstall concludes the series by returning to his home in Dorset and cooking up sustainable sardines, investigating sustainable trawling and ending with a fishing competition using Carp with his colleague Gill Meller. |
