= ChildHope UK =

Non-governmental organization

- Formation: 1989
- Type: Nongovernmental organization
- Registration no.: Registered charity no 328434
- Location: The Green House, 244 – 254 Cambridge Heath Road, London, E2 9DA, UK
- Origins: London, England
- Key people: Jill Healey, Executive Director
- Website: www.childhope.org.uk

ChildHope UK is an international charity that believes that children should enjoy a safe and secure childhood. ChildHope's work supports children who are considered the hardest to reach. These children may live and work on the street, be at risk of trafficking or child marriage, victims of abuse or sexual exploitation, working on rubbish dumps or in contact with the law. Many of these situations are interconnected and children are facing multiple challenges and risks to their safety. Children with disabilities are more likely to be stigmatised, abused, exploited or neglected. All ChildHope's programmes have an education component, whether that's traditional school-based learning, vocational skills training for young people, life skills or small business training for parents so that fewer children need to work.

== History ==
ChildHope UK was formed in 1989 with the support of UNICEF, Save The Children (Sweden) and other NGOs to address the growing number of children living on the streets around the world. When it was formed the charity's focus was on the region of Eastern Europe and in South Africa. It set up working partnerships with local organisations and created projects designed to provide for the basic needs of street children; food, shelter, healthcare and education.

By 2003 civil organisations and charities within Eastern Europe required less support from ChildHope as access to direct funding from the European Union became available. ChildHope moved to support children from more areas of the world, developing partnerships with organisations in Asia (India, Bangladesh, Thailand), East Africa (Ethiopia, Sierra Leone) and South America (Brazil, Mexico, Peru). At the point ChildHope stated to implement programmes designed to address the root causes that lead to children living and working on the streets while continuing to address street children's immediate needs and offering them counselling.

In July 2023, ChildHope announced that it will be closing in December 2023; meanwhile their partner organisations continue their work with vulnerable and marginalised children and young people, in their respective countries.

== Work with children ==
ChildHope works with vulnerable children in Bangladesh, India, Uganda, Kenya, Sierra Leone, the Gambia, Tanzania and Ethiopia.

== See also ==
- Convention on the Rights of the Child
