= Hugh Fearnley-Whittingstall =

British chef

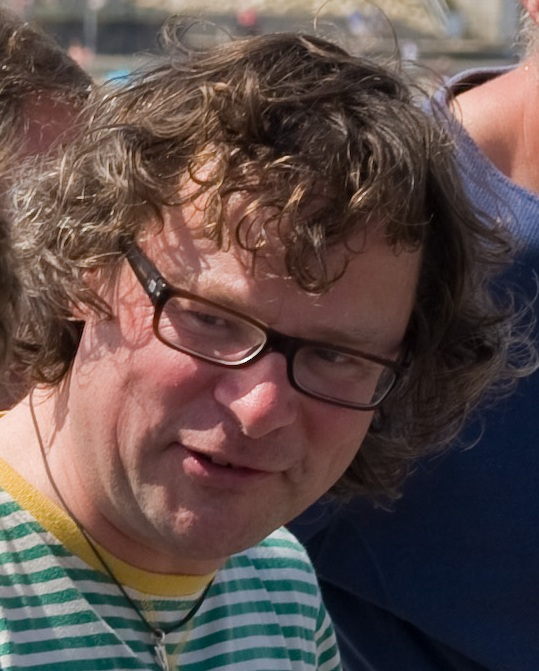
- Hugh Fearnley-Whittingstall in March 2009
- Born: Hugh Fearnley-Whittingstall; 14 January 1965 (age 61); Hampstead, London, England
- Other name: HFW
- Education: Summer Fields School; Eton College
- Alma mater: St Peter's College, Oxford
- Occupations: Celebrity chef; television personality; journalist; food writer
- Known for: River Cottage
- Spouse: Marie Derome (m. 2001)
- Children: 4
- Parents: Robert Fearnley-Whittingstall (father); Jane Lascelles (mother)
- Hugh Fearnley-Whittingstall's voice Recorded July 2009 from the BBC Radio 4 programme Desert Island Discs

Hugh Christopher Edmund Fearnley-Whittingstall (born 14 January 1965) is an English celebrity chef, television personality, journalist, and campaigner on food and environmental issues. He is a food writer and an omnivore who focuses on plant-based cooking. He hosted the River Cottage series on the UK television channel Channel 4, in which audiences observe his efforts to become a self-reliant, downshifted farmer in rural England; Fearnley-Whittingstall feeds himself, his family and friends with locally produced and sourced fruits, vegetables, fish, eggs, and meat. He has also become a campaigner on issues related to food production and the environment, such as fisheries management and animal welfare.

== Early life ==
Fearnley-Whittingstall was born in Hampstead, London, to Robert Fearnley-Whittingstall, of a landed gentry family formerly of Watford and Hawkswick, Hertfordshire, and gardener and writer Jane Fearnley-Whittingstall (née Lascelles), daughter of Colonel John Hawdon Lascelles OBE, of the King's Royal Rifle Corps. He was brought up in Gloucestershire. He was educated at Summer Fields School, Eton College, and St Peter's College, Oxford, where he read philosophy and psychology.

== Early career ==
Fearnley-Whittingstall spent some time living in Africa, where he was considering a career in wildlife conservation. He then returned to England and became a sous chef at the River Café in London. He has since said that "being messy" and "lacking discipline", though, made him unsuitable for working in the River Café kitchen, but that he regards his time there as a period that helped shape his current career.

Following his time at the River Café, Fearnley-Whittingstall commenced freelance journalism and was published in Punch, the Evening Standard, and The Sunday Times.

== Television ==
=== TV Production ===
Co-founding the award-winning KEO Films in 1995, producers of Hugh's War on Waste for the BBC, and the River Cottage Brand of TV programmes. KEO Films was declared Insolvent in 2021 and sold to another Television company.

=== Early shows ===
Fearnley-Whittingstall's initial television exposure was on A Cook on the Wild Side (1995), an exploration of earthy cuisine. His next series was TV Dinners (1996), in one episode of which he notoriously flambéed and puréed a human placenta to then serve as pâté. In 2002, he presented the six-episode series Treats from the Edwardian Country House.

=== River Cottage ===
In 1997, Fearnley-Whittingstall moved into River Cottage, a former game-keeper's lodge in the grounds of Slape Manor in Netherbury, Dorset, UK, which he had previously used as a weekend and holiday home. The lodge became the setting for three Channel 4 series: Escape to River Cottage, Return to River Cottage, and River Cottage Forever, all directed by Garry John Hughes. He has become a supporter of the organic movement.

In 2004, Beyond River Cottage followed Fearnley-Whittingstall's progress as he set up a new business, River Cottage H.Q., on a 44-acre (18 ha) property close to Dottery (near Bridport), Dorset, with his family. Underpinning his new enterprise is the selling of the produce cultivated on his property at the local marketplace, and audiences bear witness to the host's experiences as a produce seller, while also intermittently receiving the recipe lessons traditionally seen on food shows. The series concludes with a Christmas special in which a feast is brought together, consisting of a 10-bird roast using Fearnley-Whittingstall's own geese and ducks.

In 2005, a series called The View from River Cottage was produced using extracts from the four previous series, accompanied by newly recorded narration. This was followed by River Cottage Road Trip special that consisted of two newly produced one-hour instalments. During 2006, Fearnley-Whittingstall moved River Cottage HQ from the original barn near Bridport to its new premises, Park Farm, a 66-acre (27 ha) farm near Uplyme on the West Dorset/East Devon border. A new series called The River Cottage Treatment was filmed there and was broadcast on Channel 4 in November 2006. This premise of this series involved guests described as "urban-dwellers, fast-food lovers, and convenient food-mongers" to spend a week with the host on the new property, the guests being required to undertake farm duties and to eat according to the River Cottage philosophy.

In 2007, Fearnley-Whittingstall presented River Cottage: Gone Fishing, a short series that is the concept's 10th overall, in which he examines some of the lesser-known fish to be caught around the British Isles.

In late 2008, River Cottage Autumn was broadcast from 16 October to 6 November 2008. In one of the autumnal episodes, Fearnley-Whittingstall, together with his friend, John, embarks on a mission to catch crustaceans at a nearby beach with the use of pots. The pair seek to catch prawns, crabs and lobsters, in addition to the blue velvet swimming crab that is commonly found at the particular coastal location where they are based. On 19 October 2009, a new series of four episodes aired on Channel 4: River Cottage – Winter's on the Way. In one of the episodes from the winter series, Fearnley-Whittingstall captures, prepares, and cooks rabbits that he finds on his property and introduces viewers to salsify; according to the host, salsify was popular during the Victorian era.

=== New River Cottage ===
In September 2010, a new series of River Cottage episodes, entitled River Cottage Every Day, commenced. The series encouraged viewers to cook from scratch more frequently and was accompanied by a book of the same name. In autumn 2011, a new series, River Cottage Veg, was launched and is based on Fearnley-Whittingstall's developed awareness regarding the problematic way in which meat is produced and consumed in the modern era. During the series, the food activist addresses the challenge that he defines in the series' first episode: "A whole summer without flesh". Fearnley-Whittingstall explains further: "In the weeks ahead, I'll be expanding my vegetable horizons, seeking out new flavours and textures, and cooking up a whole raft of vegetable dishes with the same excitement and gusto that I've always bestowed on meat and fish." A new series of River Cottage, entitled Hugh's Three Good Things, aired on Channel 4 in December 2012.

Accompanied by a cookbook, the series was based on the notion that a great meal can be prepared from gathering three good ingredients; in the first episode, Fearnley-Whittingstall uses beetroot, egg, and anchovies to make an open sandwich. He also competed against guest chefs in each episode and viewers were invited to challenge the television host with a superior recipe. In 2012, he presented River Cottage: Three Go Mad a three-episode series inviting various British TV personalities to River Cottage and teaching them how to cook.

=== New series ===
In August 2015, alongside Lindsey Chapman, he hosted a series of five daily programmes on BBC One, linked to three evening programmes Big Blue Live. The series concentrated on marine wildlife around the UK coast. In November 2015, Fearnley-Whittingstall presented Hugh's War on Waste on BBC One, campaigning against waste by food producers, retailers, and consumers.

In 2018, he filmed Britain's Fat Fight with Hugh Fearnley-Whittingstall, a documentary for BBC One, where he explored the obesity crisis in Britain, asking food producers, restaurants, and the government to confront the crisis. Fearnley-Whittingstall's letter to the government was signed by 97,869 people; the government responded, and on 25 June, launched a new childhood obesity strategy. Also in the programme, Fearnley-Whittingstall, in partnership with Newcastle City Council, launched Newcastle Can (newcastlecan.com), an initiative and experiment aimed to encourage the citizens of Newcastle to work together to get healthier and fitter.

On 20 June 2022, a new four-part series called River Cottage Reunited premiered on More4.

=== Guest appearances ===
Hugh Fearnley-Whittingstall appeared on Celebrity Countdown in 1998; he was named by former host Richard Whiteley as the de facto champion with the highest score of the series. In 1997, he appeared on Channel 4's Time Team live dig in Turkdean. A year later, he again joined the Time Team live dig, this time at Bawsey.

He then appeared on the first series of Channel 4's The F Word in 2005, advising Gordon Ramsay on the rearing of turkeys at Ramsay's London home; the turkeys are eaten in the last episode of the series. Further appearances on The F-Word in 2006 and 2007 involved Fearnley-Whittingstall advising Ramsay on the rearing of pigs and lambs; again, the consumption of the livestock occurs in the last episodes of the series.

At the start of 2008, Fearnley-Whittingstall – along with fellow celebrity chefs Jamie Oliver and Ramsay – was featured in Channel 4's Big Food Fight season; his contribution to the season was Hugh's Chicken Run, which was shown over three consecutive nights. He created three chicken farms in Axminster (one intensive, one commercial free-range, and the third a community farm project staffed by volunteers), culminating in a "Chicken Out!" campaign to encourage the eating of free-range chicken. In 2008, based on the success of the project, further discussion occurred among Channel 4 executives regarding the filming of another season.

In 2009, Fearnley-Whittingstall became a permanent team captain, opposing a different guest captain each week, on a food-based panel game, The Big Food Fight, which began on Channel 4 on 8 September; this is not to be confused with the earlier project of the same name. On 12 June, he was a guest on BBC One's Have I Got News For You and he recorded a guest spot on BBC Radio 4's Desert Island Discs that was broadcast on 26 July and again on 31 July 2009.

Fearnley-Whittingstall appeared on BBC Two's satirical music panel show, Never Mind the Buzzcocks, on an episode recorded in 2008; airing was delayed until 19 January 2011, due to the "Sachsgate" controversy surrounding Russell Brand that led to his suspension from the BBC.

== Writing ==
Fearnley-Whittingstall published Cuisine Bon Marché in 1994. He wrote the cookbooks, The River Cottage Year, The River Cottage Fish Book (with Nick Fisher), The River Cottage Cookbook (winner of the Andre Simon Food Book of the Year award, the Guild of Food Writers’ Michael Smith Award, and the Glenfiddich Trophy and Food Book of the Year), and The River Cottage Meat Book (the last two books with photographs by Simon Wheeler). His most recent books have been published by Bloomsbury, including River Cottage Every Day and River Cottage Veg Every Day!.

He has written articles for The Guardian and The Observer since 2001. A collection of his short articles was published in October 2006 under the title Hugh Fearlessly Eats It All: Dispatches from the Gastronomic Frontline. He edited The Big Bento Box of Unuseless Japanese Inventions, written by Kenji Kawakami.

== Accolades ==
=== James Beard Awards ===
Winner

- (2008) Cookbook of the Year (The River Cottage Meat Book)
- (2008) Single Subject (The River Cottage Meat Book)

Nominated

- (2014) Vegetable Focused and Vegetarian (River Cottage Veg: 200 Inspired Vegetable Recipes)

== Activism ==
In January 2008, Fearnley-Whittingstall called on hospitality and food-service operators to use less intensively farmed chicken:

It's one thing to challenge individual consumers to give up intensively reared chicken, but it's also an issue where anyone in the business of selling chicken has to take a stand... in some cases I know chefs, not naming names, at the very high-end sector who are not using free-range birds. Some of them are on the road to Michelin stars.

In 2012, Fearnley-Whittingstall filmed a Channel 4 series, Hugh's Fish Fight. The series was broadcast in three parts on Channel 4. The campaign's website said it had received over 700,000 signatures by 2012.

In November 2015, he filmed Hugh's War on Waste. with the BBC and began a campaign to reduce consumer waste in the UK. The two programmes focused on food and clothing waste, both by supermarkets and by shoppers in their own homes.

In 2018, he filmed Britain's Fat Fight with Hugh Fearnley-Whittingstall, where he explored the obesity crisis in Britain, asking food producers, restaurants and the government to confront the crisis.

In 2021, Fearnley-Whittingstall joined the Green Party, however he tactically voted for the Liberal Democrats in the 2022 Tiverton and Honiton by-election.

== Other projects ==
Fearnley-Whittingstall helped develop Stinger, a nettle-flavoured ale, with the Hall & Woodhouse brewery.

Another Fearnley-Whittingstall project was the conversion of an old inn in Axminster to an organic produce shop and canteen, which opened in September 2007.

In 2009, he became a patron of ChildHope UK, an international child-protection charity working in Africa, Asia, and South America.

In 2009, The River Cottage Summer's Here programme promoted the Landshare project that seeks to bring together people who wish to grow fruit and vegetables, but have no land, with landowners willing to donate spare land for cultivation. The online project was commissioned by Channel 4.

Fearnley-Whittingstall is a Vice-president of international wildlife conservation NGO Fauna and Flora International.

== Personal life ==
Fearnley-Whittingstall married Marie Derome in 2001; the couple live in East Devon with their four children. Fearnley-Whittingstall also runs the River Cottage Canteen and Deli in the centre of Axminster and, in 2011, launched a second River Cottage Canteen and Deli in Plymouth (since closed) and a third in Winchester (which closed in 2020). He supports the Green Party of England and Wales.

In 2012, his barn at River Cottage was damaged by fire.

Fearnley-Whittingstall describes himself as an omnivore who focuses on plant-based cooking.

An outline of his life and beliefs, with excerpts from relevant music that he has listened to during his various campaigns, was broadcast in the BBC Radio series Private Passions on Sunday 30 June 2024.

== Published works ==
Fearnley-Whittingstall has published these books:

- TV Dinners: In Search of Exciting Home Cooking (1996)
- A Cook on the Wild Side (A Channel Four book) (1997)
- The Best of TV Dinners (1999)
- The River Cottage Cookbook (2001)
- The River Cottage Year (2003)
- The River Cottage Meat Book (2004)
- Preserved with Nick Sandler and Johnny Acton (2004)
- The Real Good Life: A Practical Guide to a Healthy, Organic Lifestyle with the Soil Association (2005)
- Soup Kitchen, with Thomasina Miers and Annabel Buckingham (2005)
- The River Cottage Family Cookbook with Fizz Carr (2005)
- Hugh Fearlessly Eats it All: Dispatches from the Gastronomic Front line (2006)
- Little Book of Soup with Thomasina Miers, Annabel Buckingham (2006)
- The Taste of Britain, with Laura Mason, and Catherine Brown (2006)
- The River Cottage Diary 2008 (2007)
- The River Cottage Fish Book with Nick Fisher (2007)
- River Cottage Diary 2010 (2009)
- River Cottage Every Day (2009)
- The River Cottage Bread Handbook (US Version) with Daniel Stevens (2010)
- The River Cottage Preserves Handbook with Pam Corbin (2010)
- River Cottage Veg Every Day! (2011)
- Three Good Things on a Plate (2012)
- River Cottage Fruit Every Day! (2013)
- River Cottage Light & Easy: Healthy Recipes for Every Day (2014)
- River Cottage Love Your Leftovers: Recipes for the Resourceful Cook (2015)
- River Cottage Much More Veg (2017)
- War on Plastic with Hugh and Anita (2019)
- Eat Better Forever: 7 Ways to Transform Your Diet (2020)
- River Cottage Good Comfort: Best-Loved Favourites Made Better for You (2022)
- How to Eat 30 Plants a Week (2024)
- High Fibre Heroes (2026)
