= Escape to River Cottage =

- Escape to River Cottage DVD cover
- Created by: Hugh Fearnley-Whittingstall
- Starring: Hugh Fearnley-Whittingstall
- Country of origin: United Kingdom
- Original language: English
- No. of episodes: 6

Production
- Producer: Jane Stephenson
- Running time: 30 minutes (with commercials)

Original release
- Network: Channel 4
- Release: 18 March – 24 December 1999

Escape to River Cottage is the first River Cottage television series in which celebrity chef Hugh Fearnley-Whittingstall takes over a Dorset cottage and sets out to achieve a form of rural self-sufficiency.

== Show summary ==
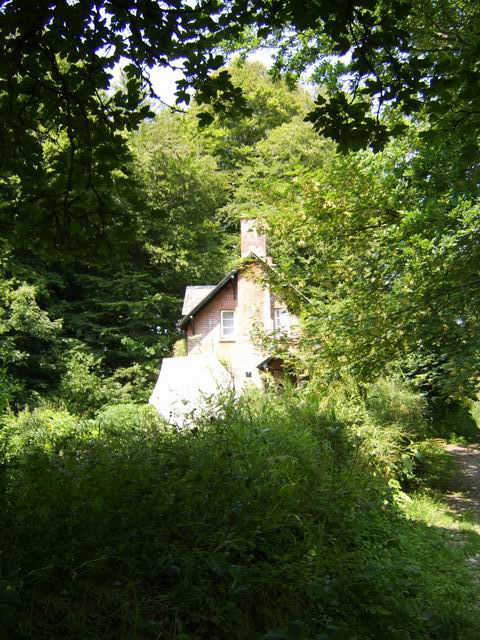
The River Cottage

Along the way, Fearnley-Whittingstall encounters many challenges largely caused by the weather and pests. Every week, Fearnley-Whittingstall meets up with different members of the Dorset community and gets a different kind of livestock (e.g., fish, pork) from each of them, usually free or bartered. Local organic vegetable guru Michael Michaud, homecraft expert Barbara and experienced vegetable competitor Roy Gunning all make appearances as the series provides insight into country life.

== List of episodes ==
Ep.	Air Date	Summary
1	18 March 1999	Fearnley-Whittingstall arrives at River Cottage, and immediately digs up the flower garden to make way for his vegetable plot. Next, he builds terraces with railway sleepers to maximize the amount of space he will have. He goes off to Peggy's pig farm and buys 2 pigs from her, then uses Peggy's trailer to transport them back to River Cottage into a shady copse near the cottage that he has prepared for them. After that, Fearnley-Whittingstall meets up with Gary, a diving and fishing expert who instructs him on the use of a speargun. Fearnley-Whittingstall fails to catch anything, but Gary manages to catch 1 mullet and 2 bass, which they promptly cook and eat BBQ-style. Fearnley-Whittingstall then visits Michael and Joy Michaud, who are organic gardeners. Michael goes back to River Cottage with Fearnley-Whittingstall to help him with his vegetable plot in return for a ham from one of Fearnley-Whittingstall's pigs in late autumn. Next, he arrives at the mansion belonging to Antony and Serena Hitchens, who have a severe pigeon problem. Every morning, more than eighty pigeons line up on the roof of their stables. Anthony then teaches Fearnley-Whittingstall how to cull the birds, and promises him the meat of any bird he culls in exchange for his help. Fearnley-Whittingstall treats them to Pastilla, a North African treat using the meat of the pigeons he got.
2	25 March 1999	Hoping for a free fish dinner, Fearnley-Whittingstall joins a gamekeeper named John to help cull the pike population on the River Piddle. Fearnley-Whittingstall's artificial lure made from a rubber duck is ineffective, but John eventually catches a large pike. To convince John that pike can be a good eating fish, Fearnley-Whittingstall prepares jellied pike. After River Cottage's first blackcurrant crop yields a mere seven berries, Fearnley-Whittingstall travels to a berry farm and works in exchange for fruit. He joins a group of Eastern European students harvesting raspberries. He also eats all the berries that are deemed overripe for supermarket shelves. Later, Fearnley-Whittingstall prepares a dessert of coffee-flavoured floating islands with blackcurrant syrup for the commune. Fearnley-Whittingstall next builds a chicken enclosure and buys six egg-laying hens from Frank, a local farmer. He uses his first egg to prepare a single-serving soufflé, which he then eats while reclining in his hammock.
3	1 April 1999	At midnight, Fearnley-Whittingstall hunts down slugs that are eating his vegetables. The next day, he and Michael Michaud inspect the River Cottage garden and enjoy some carrots, fennel and courgette for lunch. Fearnley-Whittingstall decides to compete in the Beaminster Horticultural Society's Summer show, and meets with veteran competitor Roy Gunning and his wife Barbara to get some advice. Fearnley-Whittingstall prepares a vegetable chutney to enter in the show. Next, Fearnley-Whittingstall goes diving for spider crabs and prepares linguine with crab for his diving companions. At the vegetable show, Fearnley-Whittingstall's raspberry jam and Victoria sponge win first prize. He also presents a selection of six vegetables which wins third prize. Roy once again wins in the category of "longest bean" but narrowly misses winning the challenge cup.
4	8 April 1999	Fearnley-Whittingstall joins Jan Andrews, who manages the roe deer population. At sunrise, they stalk a buck, but don't manage to get a good shot at one. Fearnley-Whittingstall cooks a breakfast of mushrooms and the liver of a deer Jan had killed the previous day. Fearnley-Whittingstall's cottage is infested by mice, so he enlists the help of vegan spiritualists who—using crystals and meditation—politely ask the mice to relocate to Fearnley-Whittingstall's shed. Later, he invites the mouse-busters back for a lunch of vegetable risotto with hazelnuts from a tree he discovered on his property. Fearnley-Whittingstall claims that he hasn't seen a mouse they were banished. He next takes a sentimental journey back to the Dorset shore, where he's reunited with Dennis Cheeseman, a man whom he met on holiday at nine years old. Just as he'd done as a child, Fearnley-Whittingstall helps Dennis harvest prawn pots. Then he prepares tempura-battered prawn with foraged sea lettuce.
5	15 April 1999	Fearnley-Whittingstall commissions a woven eel trap and baits it with a road kill rabbit, after deciding the rabbit isn't quite in good enough condition to eat. He then joins a group of cider enthusiasts as they collect windfall apples. He shares a tortilla de patatas with the cider circle and engages in a drunken game of skittles. After trapping and skinning two eels from his river, Fearnley-Whittingstall prepares eels in green herb sauce. Then, he works as a beater on a pheasant shoot and takes home several birds as payment. He cooks a pheasant, pigeon, and rabbit terrine.
6	22 April 1999	It's autumn and Fearnley-Whittingstall has been at River Cottage for six months. It's time for him to take his pigs to the abattoir. Fearnley-Whittingstall enlists the help of Victor Borge, an expert in curing Parma-style prosciutto. Fearnley-Whittingstall prepares a classic braun, a coarse pâté made from the pigs' heads. With the help of Victor and butcher Ray Smith, he starts the hams curing, stuffs a pigs stomach, and makes salami and sausages, the latter of which he smokes in the chimney. Fearnley-Whittingstall then decides to host a pork feast for his friends. But first, he learns how to catch razor fish, a type of clam, and prepares a clam dish with pork loin and sausage. He serves this and all the other pork dishes to his guests, which include Michael and Joy Michaud, Roy and Barbara Gunning, the Hitches, and all the others who helped him in the past months. As the series draws to an end, Fearnley-Whittingstall prepares his garden for next spring and decides to stay in Dorset permanently.
Christmas special	24 December 1999	In the special titled "Christmas at River Cottage", Fearnley-Whittingstall spends his first winter at River Cottage. The cider-marinated ham is ready, and he goes in search of a fat goose to accompany it. To buy his goose, he sells home made products at the local farmer's market. The marron glacé, brandy butter, and mince pies with actual lamb meat quickly sell at his farmer's market stall. Fearnley-Whittingstall feeds Christmas carol singers visiting the Hitchens' mansion with a fish cake of smoked cod. Later, he prepares a stuffed goose neck, a confit, and a roasted goose breast. Then, Fearnley-Whittingstall searches the woods for a yule log with Star, a local hedgewitch. Five members of the cider circle visit Fearnley-Whittingstall's cottage, and they feast on ham and stuffed goose neck. He wins a year's supply of cider on a wager on a game a table skittles, a victory he attributes to the magical power of his yule log. Finally, as Fearnley-Whittingstall settles in to sleep, he leaves a mince pie by the fireside for Santa Claus.
