= Knocking up =

Knocking up may refer to:

- Canvassing, a political activity, in British English
- Fertilisation, colloquially
- Knocker-up, an obsolete profession
