= Stay Tooned! =

Stay Tooned! may refer to:

- Stay Tooned! (TV programme), a 1990–1997 British television programme about the history of cartoons that aired on BBC
- Stay Tooned! (video game), a 1996 PC video game that was developed by Funnybone Interactive
