= Joy Singarayer =

British climate scientist

Joy Sargita Singarayer (born 23 September 1976) is a British climate scientist and Professor of Palaeoclimatology at the University of Reading, where she is joint Head of the Department of Meteorology. She has made contributions to understanding past climate change (particularly the Quaternary) and has used that knowledge to constrain current and future environmental changes. Her work focuses on interactions between humans, land cover/use and climate, and future implications for agriculture and water resources.

== Education and research career ==
Singarayer completed a MSci in Physics at Imperial College London in 1998. She moved to the University of Oxford and completed a PhD in 2002 on "Linearly modulated optically stimulated luminescence of sedimentary quartz: physical mechanisms and implications for dating" with Richard Bailey. Singarayer then moved to the School of Geographical Sciences, University of Bristol, where she held a lecturer and later senior lecturer position. She moved to the Department of Meteorology at the University of Reading in 2013.

Singarayer's research can be broadly split into two main areas: the use of modelling approaches to help understand of the mechanisms of environmental changes, and land surface changes (anthropogenic and natural) and their interactions with climate. Her work on the catastrophic release of fresh water during the end of the last ice age showed how ocean circulation can be affected, which has implications for future loss of ice sheets in Greenland and Antarctica. She has shown how sea ice has regulated Earth's past climate, both through reflection of sunlight and prevention of heat escaping from the warm ocean to the atmosphere. Using climate simulations, Singarayer demonstrated that methane emissions from last glacial cycle may be the result of Earth orbital changes, rather than human activity. Singarayer has also quantified the climate implications of changing land use by agriculture, including assessment of the bio-geoengineering benefits of switching to high reflectivity crops.

== Media and presenting ==
Singarayer has been involved in a number of scientific public communication activities. In 2009 she acted in an advisory capacity for the BBC's six-part "The Incredible Human Journey", exploring the evidence for the theory of early human migration out of Africa, presented by Alice Roberts. The same year, she presented four episodes of Channel 4's "Man on Earth" series, alongside Tony Robinson and Jago Cooper. It looked at the effect of climate change over the 200,000 years of human history.

Singarayer also provides commentary on historical climate-related news stories.
