= Jago Cooper =

English archaeologist (born 1977)

- Born: Jago Elliott Cooper; 1 June 1977 (age 49); St. Pancras, London, England, UK
- Occupation: Archaeologist Museum Director Professor

Jago Cooper (born 1 June 1977) is an English museum director, Professor of art and archaeology and broadcaster.

He is the Executive Director of the Sainsbury Centre and Professor of Art and Archaeology at the University of East Anglia. Formerly, he was Head of the Americas and Curator at the British Museum where he focused on the art and archaeology of North and South America and was Director of the Santo Domingo Centre of Excellence for Latin American Research.

His career working around the world broadly focuses on cross-cultural research to address contemporary challenges facing society such as climate change and global conflict. Since 2009 he has written and presented a series of programmes for BBC Four, Channel 4, and National Geographic including Lost Kingdoms of South America, Lost Kingdoms of Central America, Easter Island: Mysteries of a Lost World, Masters Of The Pacific Coast: The Tribes Of The American Northwest, and The Inca: Masters of the Clouds. He has also produced a number of museum exhibitions and published books on world culture.

== Biography ==
Cooper attended Bryanston School in Dorset, and University College London (UCL) where he was awarded BA (First Class), MA (with distinction) and PhD qualifications in archaeology. After periods working at the Museum of London, and in heritage consultancy he then worked on the teaching staff at the University of Leicester, UCL and City University of New York, Cooper joined the British Museum's Department of Africa, Oceania and the Americas in 2012 before joining the Sainsbury Centre in 2021.

== Career ==
Following early professional experience in heritage consultancy, including work with the Museum of London (2000-2001), Conybeare Morrison and Partners (2001–2002) and cultural heritage and museum development programmes for the Government of Sri Lanka (1999–2000), Cooper moved into academic and museum-related research roles.

After completing his doctoral research at UCL Institute of Archaeology from 2003 to 2007, working in Cuba and focusing on Indigenous cultural heritage and island interaction in the prehistoric Caribbean, he was appointed Lecturer in Landscape and Historical Archaeology at the University of Leicester from 2007 to 2008. He subsequently held a Leverhulme Fellowship at the University of Leicester from 2008 to 2011, during which his research developed themes relating to environmental change, human adaptation, and cultural resilience.

In 2012, Cooper was appointed Adjunct Professor at the City University of New York, a position he held alongside an Honorary Professorship from 2013 to 2019.

He also held an Honorary Lectureship at University College London from 2013 to 2022. During this period, he joined the British Museum, where he served as Head of the Americas from 2012 to 2021. In this role, he was responsible for research, collections, and curatorial programmes relating to the art, anthropology and archaeology of the Americas, and he curated major exhibitions including Peru: A Journey in Time, Arctic: Culture and Climate, Beyond El Dorado: Power and Gold in Ancient Colombia, and Where the Thunderbird Lives: Cultural Resilience on the Northwest Coast of North America.

From 2017 to 2021, Cooper founded and directed the Santo Domingo Centre of Excellence for Latin American Research (SDCELAR), an interdisciplinary initiative based at the British Museum aimed at strengthening research collaboration between Latin American and UK institutions. The centre brought together artists, scholars, community organisations, and governmental bodies to support research and public engagement projects focused on Latin American cultural heritage.

Since 2021, Cooper has served as executive director of the Sainsbury Centre for Visual Arts at the University of East Anglia, where he is also Professor of Art and Archaeology. In this role, in 2023 he has overseen a major institutional change to the museums governance and operational approach in which the collection are understood as living beings. This living art approach is different to traditional museum approaches.

He has introduced new approaches for visitors to experience Living Art including Soundescapes in which musicians compose a new piece of music that materializes the lifeforce of the artwork for visitors to listen to, Day Release in which artworks are taken out of the museum to a location they would like to be such as a Francis Bacon painting to a pub in Soho, Sharing Stories in which visitors can choose which voice of the artwork they would like to hear from, Live Art in which visitors get inside an exhibition case and become the work of art looked at by artworks suspended from the ceiling looking at them.

The Living Art approach led to a revised curatorial concept emphasizing exhibition programming focused on fundamental societal questions with six month seasons exploring questions such as Can We Stop Killing Each Other? What is Truth? Why do I Take Drugs? Can the Seas Survive Us? What is the Meaning of Life? with associated public engagement and dialogue spaces enabling art and material culture to activate societal dialogue around these questions. In 2024 the Sainsbury Centre was nominated for the European Museum of the Year award.

In addition to his directorial and academic roles, Cooper has held governance and advisory positions within the cultural sector, including Trustee and Chair of the Future Strategy Board at Art UK from 2023.

He has served as an invited reviewer and advisor for major research funding bodies, including the Swedish Research Council FORMAS, the US National Science Foundation, the Natural Environment Research Council, and the Social Sciences and Humanities Research Council of Canada. He has also acted as a judge for sector awards including the Art Fund Museum of the Year.

== Research work ==
Cooper’s academic career spans art, archaeology, anthropology, and museum studies, with a particular emphasis on cultural heritage, global change, and the long-term development of societies around the world. He has participated in international research programmes including the Integrated History and Future of People on Earth (IHOPE) scientific steering committee and National Geographic Explorer projects.

His research and fieldwork have been conducted in multiple regions including the Caribbean, Latin America, North America, South Asia, Pacific and parts of Europe. He has also contributed to interdisciplinary projects involving digital heritage and museum collections, including the Google Arts & Culture “Maya Project,” which aimed to expand global access to Maya cultural heritage through digital platforms and Many New Worlds Project researching the origins and processes of colonialism and globalization in the Caribbean through art and material culture.

In 2012 he released the book Surviving Sudden Environmental Change: Answers from Archaeology with Payson D. Sheets which was described as being one of the "outstanding examples of 'thinking big'. . . carefully researched, interdisciplinary, focused and informative" by Erika Guttmann-Bond in the Antiquity Journal.

Cooper has authored and co-authored books, edited volumes, and exhibition catalogues on art, archaeology and museum practice, including Peru: A Journey in Time, The Arctic: Culture and Climate, and Mapping a New Museum: Politics and Practice of Latin American Research with the British Museum.

Cooper has also contributed to research on cultures through his curatorial and academic work with Indigenous peoples in the Americas. In collaboration with colleagues, he co-authored Arctic: Culture and Climate, which combines art, archaeological, and museum collections research to examine long-term Indigenous adaptation strategies in extreme environments.

A further dimension of his research involves museum practice and the politics of representation. His edited volume Mapping a New Museum examines how museums construct knowledge about Latin America and how curatorial practices shape public understanding of history and material culture.

== Broadcasting and media work ==
In 2009 Cooper co-presented the Channel 4 series Man on Earth with Tony Robinson and Joy Singarayer, and in 2011 wrote and presented the series Lost Kingdoms of South America for BBC Four, including four episodes exploring the Chachapoya people, the city of Tiwanaku, the legend of El Dorado and the Kingdom of Chimor.

A second series aired in September 2014 entitled Lost Kingdoms of Central America focusing on the Olmec, Chiriquí (Ngäbe) and Taíno people and the ancient Mexican city of Teotihuacan.

In 2013 he filmed a one off-special for BBC 4 entitled Easter Island: Mysteries of a Lost World which re-examined the historic collapse in Rapa Nui society.

In January 2015 saw the broadcast of the two part series The Inca: Masters of the Clouds, also on BBC 4. In 2017 he wrote and presented a two part series working with Indigenous colleagues and communities on the northwest coast of North America, Masters of the Pacific Coast aired on the BBC and Knowledge Canada.

He has also contributed to radio programming and podcasts on cultural heritage, art and archaeology, appearing on platforms such as BBC Radio 4 programmes including Front Row, Start the Week, and Free Thinking.

== Curated exhibitions ==
- Peru: A Journey in Time. 11 November 2021 - 20 February 2022, British Museum - Marking Peru's bicentennial year of independence, this exhibition highlighted the history, beliefs and cultural achievements of the different peoples who lived here from around 2500 BC to the arrival of Europeans in the 1500s, and their legacy in the centuries that followed.
- Arctic: Culture and Climate. 22 October 2020 - 21 February 2021, British Museum - "Developed in collaboration with Arctic communities, the exhibition celebrated the ingenuity and resilience of Arctic Peoples throughout history. It told the powerful story of respectful relationships with icy worlds and how Arctic Peoples have harnessed the weather and climate to thrive."
- Where the Thunderbird Lives: Cultural Resilience on the Northwest Coast of North America. 23 February - 27 August 2017, British Museum - "Where the Thunderbird lives celebrated the cultural resilience of First Nation communities on the Northwest Coast of North America. The exhibition aimed to bring the story of communities with more than 10,000 years of cultural continuity to an international audience at the British Museum."
- The season What Is Truth? explored how truth is constructed, mediated, and contested in the modern world. Through exhibitions such as The Camera Never Lies, Jeffrey Gibson: no simple word for time, Liquid Gender, The Heart of Truth, Tank Man, and In Event of Moon Disaster, Cooper examined questions of authenticity, memory, media manipulation, and cultural perception. The season challenged viewers to consider how truth is shaped by technology, politics, identity, and collective imagination.
- In Why Do We Take Drugs?, Cooper turned to humanity’s longstanding relationship with altered states of consciousness and intoxication. Exhibitions including Lindsey Mendick: Hot Mess, Heroin Falls, Ivan Morison: Toward the Weird Heart of Things, Ayahuasca & Art of the Amazon, and Power Plants: Intoxicants, Stimulants and Narcotics explored the cultural, spiritual, medical, and psychological dimensions of substance use. Through these works, Cooper positioned drugs not merely as substances of consumption but as tools for ritual, healing, escape, and transformation across societies.
- The season What Is the Planet for Our Future? reflected Cooper’s concern with ecological futures and humanity’s relationship to material existence. Projects such as Sediment Spirit, The Stuff of Life | The Life of Stuff, Coral Love, Coastal Collections, Coastal Connections, and Empowering Art: Indigenous Creativity and Activism from North America’s Northwest Coast investigated environmental fragility, Indigenous ecological knowledge, and sustainable coexistence. Cooper’s framing emphasized that environmental futures are inseparable from cultural memory and collective responsibility.
- With Can the Seas Survive Us?, Cooper focused specifically on oceans as both ecological systems and cultural imaginaries. Exhibitions like Sea Inside, Dialogic Space, Darwin in Paradise Camp: Yuki Kihara, and World of Water explored marine vulnerability, climate crisis, colonial histories, and oceanic interconnectedness. Through this season, Cooper positioned the sea as a site where environmental, political, and spiritual questions converge.
- The season Can We Stop Killing Each Other? confronted conflict, resilience, and the possibility of peace. Through exhibitions such as Seeds of Hate and Hope, Reflections on Peace: National Gallery Masterpieces Tour, Roots of Resilience: Tesfaye Urgessa, Eyewitness, and Tiaki Ora ∞ Protecting Life: Anton Forde, Cooper brought together artistic responses to violence, remembrance, reconciliation, and healing. The exhibitions highlighted humanity’s capacity for destruction while also foregrounding resistance and renewal.
- What Is the Meaning of Life? addressed existence itself through exhibitions including Play Power, Living by The Rule: Contemporary Meets Medieval, Life in the Multiverse: Libby Heaney, Joy Like Time, and Tree of Healing. Here, Cooper explored spirituality, play, mortality, and metaphysical possibility, encouraging audiences to reflect on how meaning is constructed across cultures and historical periods.

== Selected publications ==
=== Books ===
- Cooper, J. & Sheets, P. (eds). 2012 Surviving Sudden Environmental Change: Answers from Archaeology. University of Colorado Press, Boulder.
- Lincoln, A, Cooper, J. & Loovers, J. P. L. 2020 Arctic: Culture and Climate. Thames & Hudson [ISBN 978-05004-80663]
- Sunnucks, L. O. & Cooper, J. 2021 Mapping a New Museum. Routledge [ISBN 978-10004-12512]
- Pardo, C. & Cooper, J. (eds). 2021 Peru: a journey in time. British Museum Press, London, UK [ISBN 978-07141-24919]
- Cooper, J. (2023). Living art: Sharing stories. Norwich, UK: Sainsbury Centre.

=== Journal articles and book chapters ===
- Cooper, Jago; Peros, Matthew (2010). "The archaeology of climate change in the Caribbean". Journal of Archaeological Science. 37 (6): 1226–1232. doi:10.1016/j.jas.2009.12.022. ISSN 0305-4403.
- Cooper, J.; Hofman, C. L. "Caribbean archaeology and the study of mobility and exchange.". In Hofman, C. L.; Hoogland, M. L. P. (eds.). The Caribbean Before Columbus. Oxford University Press.
- Hayward, Michele H.; Cinquino, Michael A. (2020), "Caribbean Prehistoric Archaeology", Encyclopedia of Global Archaeology, Springer, Cham, pp. 1810–1872, doi:10.1007/978-3-030-30018-0_3172, ISBN 978-3-030-30018-0
- Sheets, Payson; Cooper, Jago, "INTRODUCTION:", Surviving Sudden Environmental Change, University Press of Colorado, pp. 1–18
- Cooper, Jago; Samson, Alice; Nieves, Miguel (1 August 2016). "'The Mona Chronicle': the archaeology of early religious encounter in the New World". Cambridge University Press. 90 (352).
