= Words and Pictures (TV programme) =

British TV series

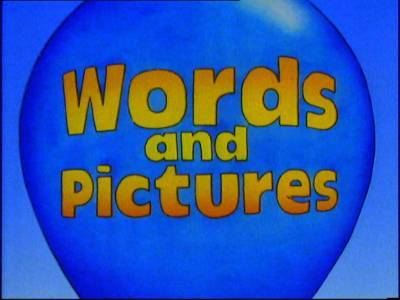
- Genre: Educational
- Presented by: Gabriel Woolf (1970); Tony Robinson (1972–73); Henry Woolf (1975–78); Vicky Ireland (1982–89); Stuart Bradley (1990); Sophie Aldred (1992–93, 1996–99, 2001); Michael Hobbs (1993–94); Paul Ewing (1999–2001); Pui Fan Lee and William Vanderpuye (2006–07)
- Composers: Paddy Kingsland; Michael Henry (Year 2: 2001)
- Country of origin: United Kingdom
- Original language: English
- No. of series: 19
- No. of episodes: 358

Production
- Running time: 15 minutes

Original release
- Network: BBC1 (1970–83); BBC2 (1984–2007)
- Release: 31 March 1970 – 16 March 2007

Words and Pictures is a British literacy educational television programme as part of the BBC Schools strand from 31 March 1970 to 16 March 2007. The programme is a spin-off from Look and Read, which was already providing the same type of practice and encouragement for older children. It is aimed at primary school children aged between 5 and 7.

== Episodes ==
=== Series 1: Up in the Attic (1970) ===
No. overall	No. in series	Title	Original release date
1	1	"The Animals in the Ark"	20 April 1970
2	2	"Consonants"	22 April 1970
3	3	"Pug's Favourite Things"	27 April 1970
4	4	"short vowels"	29 April 1970
5	5	"The Magic Pin"	4 May 1970
6	6	"word building"	6 May 1970
7	7	"Lazybones"	11 May 1970
8	8	"lazy letters"	13 May 1970
9	9	"The Boy Without a Name"	18 May 1970
10	10	"magic 'e'"	20 May 1970
11	11	"The Prince and the Spy"	1 June 1970
12	12	"inconsistent consonants"	3 June 1970
13	13	"The Story of Moka"	8 June 1970
14	14	"consonant digraphs"	10 June 1970
15	15	"Going, Going..."	15 June 1970
16	16	"word endings"	17 June 1970

=== Series 2: Sam on Boffs' Island (1972–73) ===
No. overall	No. in series	Title	Original release date
17	1	"Programme 1"	18 September 1972
18	2	"Programme 2"	20 September 1972
19	3	"Programme 3"	2 October 1972
20	4	"Programme 4"	4 October 1972
21	5	"Programme 5"	16 October 1972
22	6	"Programme 6"	18 October 1972
23	7	"Programme 7"	6 November 1972
24	8	"Programme 8"	8 November 1972
25	9	"Programme 9"	20 November 1972
26	10	"Programme 10"	22 November 1972
27	11	"Programme 11"	15 January 1973
28	12	"Programme 12"	17 January 1973
29	13	"Programme 13"	29 January 1973
30	14	"Programme 14"	31 January 1973
31	15	"Programme 15"	12 February 1973
32	16	"Programme 16"	14 February 1973
33	17	"Programme 17"	5 March 1973
34	18	"Programme 18"	7 March 1973
35	19	"Programme 19"	19 March 1973
36	20	"Programme 20"	21 March 1973

=== Series 3 (1975–76) ===
No. overall	No. in series	Title	Original release date
37	1	"Mighty Monsters"	22 September 1975
38	2	"Greedy Old Nan"	24 September 1975
39	3	"Will You Help Me?"	6 October 1975
40	4	"Mr Bumble's Invention"	8 October 1975
41	5	"Pigs and Pumpkins"	20 October 1975
42	6	"Wizards and Witches"	22 October 1975
43	7	"Magic"	10 November 1975
44	8	"Monkey Tricks"	12 November 1975
45	9	"Up and Down and Around"	24 November 1975
46	10	"Fat Fairy"	26 November 1975
47	11	"The Elephant and the Bad Baby"	12 January 1976
48	12	"Terrible Tiger"	14 January 1976
49	13	"Rabbits and Rockets"	26 January 1976
50	14	"Happy Horse"	28 January 1976
51	15	"The Lion Who Wished"	9 February 1976
52	16	"The Cat Who Forgot"	11 February 1976
53	17	"Giddy Goose"	1 March 1976
54	18	"Trog and His Axe"	3 March 1976
55	19	"Trog and the Dog"	15 March 1976
56	20	"What Is It?"	17 March 1976
57	21	"Growly Bear"	26 April 1976
58	22	"Trog Makes a Trap"	28 April 1976
59	23	"Sing a Song"	10 May 1976
60	24	"Trip Trap"	12 May 1976
61	25	"The Mouse and the Winds"	24 May 1976
62	26	"Mrs Mopple's Washing Line"	26 May 1976
63	27	"The Sun Shone"	14 June 1976
64	28	"The Wonderful Cake"	16 June 1976

=== Series 4 (1977–78) ===
No. overall	No. in series	Title	Original release date
65	1	"The Very Hungry Caterpillar"	19 September 1977
66	2	"A List"	26 September 1977
67	3	"A Lost Button"	3 October 1977
68	4	"The King's Birthday"	10 October 1977
69	5	"The Removal Men"	17 October 1977
70	6	"Meg and Mog"	24 October 1977
71	7	"Wicked Wolf"	7 November 1977
72	8	"The Journey"	14 November 1977
73	9	"Mr Gumpy's Outing"	21 November 1977
74	10	"The Christmas Tree Fairy"	28 November 1977
75	11	"Tony and His Friends"	9 January 1978
76	12	"Big Dog... Little Dog"	16 January 1978
77	13	"Meg on the Moon"	23 January 1978
78	14	"The Magic Fish"	30 January 1978
79	15	"A New Home for Snow Ball"	6 February 1978
80	16	"Thomas the Tiger Teacher"	13 February 1978
81	17	"Too Much Noise"	20 February 1978
82	18	"Tale of the Turnip"	27 February 1978
83	19	"Who Took the Farmer's Hat?"	6 March 1978
84	20	"The Letter"	13 March 1978
85	21	"I am Better than You!"	17 April 1978
86	22	"The Little Boy's Secret"	24 April 1978
87	23	"My Uncle Charlie"	3 May 1978
88	24	"Frog and Toad Together"	8 May 1978
89	25	"The Monkey and the Crocodile"	15 May 1978
90	26	"Questions, Questions"	22 May 1978
91	27	"When Willy Went to the Wedding"	5 June 1978
92	28	"The Runaway Roller Skate"	12 June 1978

=== Series 5 (1982–83) ===
No. overall	No. in series	Title	Original release date
93	1	"Maybe It's a Tiger"	20 September 1982
94	2	"Cats"	27 September 1982
95	3	"Mog and the Baby"	4 October 1982
96	4	"The Hat"	11 October 1982
97	5	"Witches Four"	18 October 1982
98	6	"The Surprise"	1 November 1982
99	7	"Run, Rabbit, Run"	8 November 1982
100	8	"Fishing"	15 November 1982
101	9	"The Little Girl and the Tiny Doll"	22 November 1982
102	10	"Sam's Christmas Tree"	29 November 1982
103	11	"The Three Little Pigs"	10 January 1983
104	12	"Noisy Neville"	17 January 1983
105	13	"Goodnight!"	24 January 1983
106	14	"The King and the Fluteplayer"	31 January 1983
107	15	"Mrs Lather's Laundry"	7 February 1983
108	16	"Master Salt The Sailor's Son"	14 February 1983
109	17	"Miss Jump The Jockey"	28 February 1983
110	18	"The Three Billy-Goats Gruff"	7 March 1983
111	19	"Monsters"	14 March 1983
112	20	"The Tale of the Turnip"	21 March 1983
113	21	"Funnybones"	25 April 1983
114	22	"Oliver Ostrich"	4 May 1983
115	23	"The Door That Would Not Open"	9 May 1983
116	24	"Going, Going, Gone!"	16 May 1983
117	25	"Dizzy Duncan"	23 May 1983
118	26	"What Made Tiddalik Laugh?"	6 June 1983
119	27	"The Flood is Coming"	13 June 1983
120	28	"Dogger"	20 June 1983

=== Series 6 (1984) ===
No. overall	No. in series	Title	Original release date
121	1	"Sing a Song"	16 January 1984
122	2	"Quiet as a Mouse"	23 January 1984
123	3	"Peace at Last"	30 January 1984
124	4	"Owl at Home"	6 February 1984
125	5	"Money to Spend"	13 February 1984
126	6	"Oink and Pearl"	27 February 1984
127	7	"Auntie Min"	5 March 1984
128	8	"Trog and His Axe"	12 March 1984
129	9	"Trog Makes a Trap"	19 March 1984
130	10	"Trog and the Dog"	26 March 1984
131	11	"The Old Brown Hat"	9 May 1984
132	12	"Chicken Licken"	14 May 1984
133	13	"The Hungry Fox and the Foxy Duck"	21 May 1984
134	14	"What Is It?"	4 June 1984
135	15	"Strange Bumps"	11 June 1984
136	16	"Posy and Sam"	18 June 1984
137	17	"I am Better than You!"	25 June 1984
138	18	"Frog and Toad are Friends"	2 July 1984

=== Series 7 (1984) ===
No. overall	No. in series	Title	Original release date
139	1	"Wicked Wolf"	17 September 1984
140	2	"Alex and Roy"	24 September 1984
141	3	"The King's Birthday"	1 October 1984
142	4	"Big Dog... Little Dog"	8 October 1984
143	5	"Lift Off"	15 October 1984
144	6	"The Journey"	29 October 1984
145	7	"Mog in the Dark"	5 November 1984
146	8	"The Magic Fish"	12 November 1984
147	9	"The Winter Bear"	19 November 1984
148	10	"Slippery Snow"	26 November 1984

=== Series 8 (1987) ===
No. overall	No. in series	Title	Original release date
149	1	"On My Way to School"	21 September 1987
150	2	"Signs and Signals"	28 September 1987
151	3	"Butterflies and Moths"	5 October 1987
152	4	"Johnny-Cake"	12 October 1987
153	5	"Each Peach, Pear, Plum"	19 October 1987
154	6	"The Three Bears"	2 November 1987
155	7	"Forget-Me-Not"	9 November 1987
156	8	"Kites and Kangaroos"	16 November 1987
157	9	"On the Way Home"	23 November 1987
158	10	"Come to the Show"	30 November 1987

=== Series 9 (1989) ===
No. overall	No. in series	Title	Original release date
159	1	"Happy Birthday, Moon"	9 January 1989
160	2	"Thomas Tortoise"	16 January 1989
161	3	"The Glerp"	23 January 1989
162	4	"Dear Daddy"	30 January 1989
163	5	"The Very Busy Spider"	6 February 1989
164	6	"A List"	13 February 1989
165	7	"The Story"	20 February 1989
166	8	""Ahhh!" said Stork"	27 February 1989
167	9	"Are You My Mother?"	6 March 1989
168	10	"Tortoise's Dream"	13 March 1989
169	11	"Fourteen Rats and a Rat-Catcher"	17 April 1989
170	12	"Spring"	24 April 1989
171	13	"Tomorrow"	3 May 1989
172	14	"The Challenging Bull"	8 May 1989
173	15	"On the Other Side of the River"	15 May 1989
174	16	"Mrs Plug the Plumber"	22 May 1989
175	17	"The Bad Tempered Ladybird"	5 June 1989
176	18	"The Runaway Roller-Skate"	12 June 1989

=== Series 10 (1990) ===
No. overall	No. in series	Title	Original release date
177	1	"Arthur"	15 January 1990
178	2	"Princess Gorilla and a New Kind of Water"	22 January 1990
179	3	"Rapunzel"	29 January 1990
180	4	"The Surprise Party"	5 February 1990
181	5	"Carry Go Bring Come"	12 February 1990
182	6	"Katie Morag and the Tiresome Ted"	26 February 1990
183	7	"The Enormous Turnip"	5 March 1990
184	8	"The Shopping Basket"	12 March 1990
185	9	"Mrs Wobble the Waitress"	19 March 1990
186	10	"The Little Red Hen"	26 March 1990
187	11	"One Moonlit Night"	30 April 1990
188	12	"Monster Can't Sleep"	9 May 1990
189	13	"Winnie the Witch"	14 May 1990
190	14	"The Trouble with Gran"	21 May 1990
191	15	"The Paper Bag Princess"	4 June 1990
192	16	"If I Were A Crocodile"	11 June 1990
193	17	"Oscar Got the Blame"	18 June 1990
194	18	"The Hare and the Tortoise"	25 June 1990

=== Series 11 (1990) ===
No. overall	No. in series	Title	Original release date
195	1	"Mr Wolf's Week"	19 September 1990
196	2	"Aardvark's Picnic"	26 September 1990
197	3	"The Blind Men and the Elephant"	3 October 1990
198	4	"It's Not Fair!"	10 October 1990
199	5	"Where Are You Going, Little Mouse?"	17 October 1990
200	6	"The King Who Learned To Smile"	31 October 1990
201	7	"Alistair's Time Machine"	7 November 1990
202	8	"Meanwhile... Back at the Ranch"	14 November 1990
203	9	"I'm Going on a Dragon Hunt"	21 November 1990
204	10	"A Bear for Christmas"	28 November 1990

=== Series 12 (1992–93) ===
No. overall	No. in series	Title	Original release date
205	1	"The Owl and the Pussy Cat"	16 September 1992
206	2	"The Town Mouse and the Country Mouse"	23 September 1992
207	3	"Tidy Titch"	30 September 1992
208	4	"Farmer Duck"	7 October 1992
209	5	"Peter's Chair"	14 October 1992
210	6	"Whatever Next!"	21 October 1992
211	7	"Let's Go Home, Little Bear"	4 November 1992
212	8	"Matthew's Dream"	11 November 1992
213	9	"Jack and the Beanstalk"	18 November 1992
214	10	"I Want a Cat"	25 November 1992
215	11	"But Martin!"	13 January 1993
216	12	"The King's Pudding"	20 January 1993
217	13	"The Sky Is Falling"	27 January 1993
218	14	"Greedy Zebra"	3 February 1993
219	15	"Katie Morag Delivers the Mail"	10 February 1993
220	16	"Supermoo!"	24 February 1993
221	17	"The Grasshopper and the Ants"	3 March 1993
222	18	"Elmer"	10 March 1993
223	19	"In a Minute"	17 March 1993
224	20	"Musical Max"	24 March 1993
225	21	"Andrew's Bath"	28 April 1993
226	22	"Little Beaver and the Echo"	5 May 1993
227	23	"Why Anansi the Spiderman Makes Webs"	12 May 1993
228	24	"The Elves and the Shoemaker"	19 May 1993
229	25	"This is the Bear and the Picnic Lunch"	26 May 1993
230	26	"Super Dooper Jezebel"	2 June 1993
231	27	"A Dragon in a Wagon"	9 June 1993
232	28	"Mermaid Janine"	16 June 1993

=== Series 13 (1993–94) ===
No. overall	No. in series	Title	Original release date
233	1	"My Cat Likes to Hide in Boxes"	22 September 1993
234	2	"How Anansi Tricked Snake and Was Given Tiger's Tail"	29 September 1993
235	3	"Give a Dog a Name"	6 October 1993
236	4	"The Golden Goose"	13 October 1993
237	5	"Owl Babies"	20 October 1993
238	6	"Spaghetti for Suzy"	3 November 1993
239	7	"A Roar for Stanley"	10 November 1993
240	8	"Not Now, Bernard"	17 November 1993
241	9	"The Magic Brush"	24 November 1993
242	10	"The Little Fir Tree"	1 December 1993
243	11	"Who Sank the Boat?"	12 January 1994
244	12	"The Pig in the Pond"	19 January 1994
245	13	"The Honey Hunter"	26 January 1994
246	14	"Kipper's Toybox"	2 February 1994
247	15	"But No Elephants"	9 February 1994
248	16	"Get Lost, Laura!"	23 February 1994
249	17	"Time to Get Up"	2 March 1994
250	18	"The Story of Icarus"	9 March 1994
251	19	"Under the Stairs"	16 March 1994
252	20	"You Can't Catch Me"	23 March 1994
253	21	"Jamaica Tag-Along"	20 April 1994
254	22	"Hairy Maclary's Rumpus at the Vet"	27 April 1994
255	23	"Where the Wild Things Are"	4 May 1994
256	24	"The Fox and the Crow"	11 May 1994
257	25	"Frog in Winter"	18 May 1994
258	26	"The Great Green Forest"	25 May 1994
259	27	"The Princess on the Pea"	8 June 1994
260	28	"Monster Monday!"	15 June 1994

=== Series 14 (1996–97) ===
No. overall	No. in series	Title	Original release date
261	1	"The Very Hungry Caterpillar"	18 September 1996
262	2	"Acrobatic Alphabet"	25 September 1996
263	3	"Dinosaur Fright"	2 October 1996
264	4	"A Busy Day for a Good Grandmother"	9 October 1996
265	5	"Oliver's Wood"	16 October 1996
266	6	"Suddenly"	30 October 1996
267	7	"The Cross-with-Us Rhinoceros"	6 November 1996
268	8	"The Last Noo-Noo"	13 November 1996
269	9	""Not Me" Said the Monkey"	20 November 1996
270	10	"Father Christmas's Feet"	27 November 1996
271	11	""I Don't Care", Said the Bear"	8 January 1997
272	12	"Persephone and the Pomegranate"	15 January 1997
273	13	"The Hare and the Hedgehog"	22 January 1997
274	14	"Katie Morag and the Tiresome Ted"	29 January 1997
275	15	"Emeka's Gift"	5 February 1997
276	16	"The Tusk Fairy"	12 February 1997
277	17	"The Leopard's Drum"	26 February 1997
278	18	"Pass The Jam, Jim"	5 March 1997
279	19	"Jack's Fantastic Voyage"	12 March 1997
280	20	"The Wind Blew"	19 March 1997
281	21	"Gran, Gran!"	16 April 1997
282	22	"Meg the Clever Red Hen"	23 April 1997
283	23	"Big Fish, Little Fish"	30 April 1997
284	24	"Mog on Fox Night"	7 May 1997
285	25	"The Dog That Dug"	14 May 1997
286	26	"The Emperor and the Nightingale"	21 May 1997
287	27	"Make Your Own Words and Pictures"	4 June 1997
288	28	"Poetry: The Sea"	11 June 1997

=== Series 15: Phonics Special (1999) ===
No. overall	No. in series	Title	Original release date
289	1	"Ee"	12 January 1999
290	2	"Ea"	19 January 1999
291	3	"Ay"	26 January 1999
292	4	"Ai"	2 February 1999
293	5	"A-e"	9 February 1999
294	6	"Y"	23 February 1999
295	7	"Igh"	2 March 1999
296	8	"I-e"	9 March 1999
297	9	"Oa"	16 March 1999
298	10	"Oo"	23 March 1999

=== Series 16: Words and Pictures Plus - CVC Words (1999) / Consonant Clusters (2000) ===
No. overall	No. in series	Title	Original release date
299	1	"The Dancing Hen"	20 September 1999
300	2	"This is the Bear and the Picnic Lunch"	27 September 1999
301	3	"Who's in the Shed?"	4 October 1999
302	4	"Need a Trim, Jim?"	11 October 1999
303	5	"Ridiculous!"	18 October 1999
304	6	"Who's at the Door?"	1 November 1999
305	7	"I Don't Want to Go to Bed!"	8 November 1999
306	8	"The Fish Who Could Wish"	15 November 1999
307	9	"Rumble in the Jungle"	22 November 1999
308	10	"The Snow Lambs"	29 November 1999
309	11	"One Duck Stuck"	17 January 2000
310	12	"Blooming Cats"	24 January 2000
311	13	"Boo!"	31 January 2000
312	14	"The Fox and the Stork"	7 February 2000
313	15	"The Grumpalump"	14 February 2000
314	16	"Three Billy Goats Gruff"	28 February 2000
315	17	"Whistling Thorn"	6 March 2000
316	18	"Lucy's Quarrel"	13 March 2000
317	19	"The Old Woman and the Red Pumpkin"	20 March 2000
318	20	"Give Me My Yam!"	27 March 2000

=== Series 17: Words and Pictures Plus Spelling Strategies - Long Vowels / Word Endings (2001) ===
No. overall	No. in series	Title	Original release date
319	1	"Katie Morag Delivers the Mail"	23 April 2001
320	2	"Mr McGee Goes to Sea"	30 April 2001
321	3	"The Lighthouse Keeper's Lunch"	11 May 2001
322	4	"Bubble and Float"	14 May 2001
323	5	"Little Rabbit Foo Foo"	22 May 2001
324	6	""Only Joking" Laughed the Lobster"	5 June 2001
325	7	"Saturday Night at the Dinosaur Stomp"	11 June 2001
326	8	"The Big Wide-Mouthed Frog"	18 June 2001

=== Series 18: Phonics Year 2 (2001) ===
No. overall	No. in series	Title	Original release date
327	1	"Ow/ou"	10 September 2001
328	2	"Oy/oi"	17 September 2001
329	3	"Ar/a"	24 September 2001
330	4	"Oo/u"	8 October 2001
331	5	"Air/are/ear"	15 October 2001
332	6	"Or"	5 November 2001
333	7	"Aw/au/augh"	12 November 2001
334	8	"Er/ir/ur"	19 November 2001
335	9	"Ear/eer/ere"	26 November 2001
336	10	"Er/or/a"	3 December 2001

=== Series 19: Fun with Phonics (2006–07) ===
No. overall	No. in series	Title	Original release date
337	1	"P & A"	1 December 2006
338	2	"T & I"	1 December 2006
339	3	"S & N"	8 December 2006
340	4	"M & E"	8 December 2006
341	5	"D & R"	15 December 2006
342	6	"C & H"	15 December 2006
343	7	"G & O"	11 January 2007
344	8	"U & B"	12 January 2007
345	9	"F & L"	18 January 2007
346	10	"W & J"	19 January 2007
347	11	"Qu & V"	25 January 2007
348	12	"K & X"	26 January 2007
349	13	"Z & Y"	1 February 2007
350	14	"Ch & Th"	2 February 2007
351	15	"Sh & Ng"	8 February 2007
352	16	"Ai & Ie"	9 February 2007
353	17	"Ee & Oi"	1 March 2007
354	18	"Ue & Oa"	2 March 2007
355	19	"Ou & Oo (short)"	8 March 2007
356	20	"Oo (long) & Er"	9 March 2007
357	21	"Or & Ar"	15 March 2007
358	22	"Tricky Words 1 & 2"	16 March 2007
