= Mary Smith (knocker upper) =

British woman, active c. 1900–1934

- Smith at work in 1927 or 1931
- Occupation: Knocker-upper
- Years active: 1900s–1934
- Known for: Waking up workers each morning

Mary Ann Smith was an English knocker-upper who worked in London from the 1900s to the 1930s. She used a pea shooter and dried peas as her implements for waking clients, charging each client sixpence a week. Her tool was unusual for the time, as most knocker-uppers had a pole with wire on the end that was used to scratch at windows. Her customers included the dock workers who lived in the East End of London, and she was known for waking hundreds of people every morning during the work week.

== Family and work ==
When the 1911 and 1921 censuses were taken, Mary Ann Smith and her husband Thomas Edward Smith (both born ca. 1866) were recorded as living at 71 Brenton Street in Limehouse, east London. According to the 1911 census, she had given birth to 16 children, only 2 of whom were still alive: a 21-year-old daughter, Ellen, and a 14-year-old son, Thomas Edward, who worked as a dock messenger. Mary's occupation was recorded as "tin box maker" and her husband's as "riverside labourer".

Their son was the original knocker-upper in the family, and the Jackson Citizen Patriot claimed that he invented the pea shooting technique. He was killed in active service during the First World War, and his parents continued the family occupation. At the time of the 1921 census, Mary's occupation was recorded as "caller up" and her husband's as "watchman". After her husband became permanently disabled in 1930, Mary was the family's sole breadwinner until 1934, when she retired at the age of 69. A daughter, Molly Moore, worked in the same profession and was one of the last remaining knocker-uppers before the tradition largely ended in the 1940s and 1950s.

== Legacy ==
The photographer and police officer John Topham took a photo of Smith in 1931 that became synonymous with the occupation of knocker-uppers and also kickstarted Topham's own career after he sold the photo to the Daily Mirror. A 1932 book, Strange as It May Seem by John Hix, described Smith's life and career. In 2003 a picture book entitled Mary Smith was published by Andrea U'Ren and contained a 1927 archival photo of Smith. In the book, Smith goes to the homes of each of her clients, who carried out all the main professions in the town, before waking the mayor and being praised by him for her work. She returns home, happy at her success, to find her children still asleep in bed.
