= Codex (game show) =

- Genre: Game show
- Presented by: Tony Robinson
- Country of origin: United Kingdom
- Original language: English
- No. of series: 2
- No. of episodes: 12

Production
- Running time: 60 minutes (Series 1); 50 minutes (Series 2)
- Production company: Diverse Productions

Original release
- Network: Channel 4
- Release: 12 November 2006 – 15 December 2007

Codex is a game show that aired on Channel 4 from 12 November 2006 to 15 December 2007 and was hosted by Tony Robinson.

== Format ==
=== Series 1 ===
In the first series, a single team of five explorers solve a series of games in order to win letters that may help them solve a 'codex', an encoded cryptic clue, at the end of the programme.

Before each round, Tony shows the team one or more historical artefacts and gives some background to the objects. The team is then asked to answer seven questions relating to the artefacts in three minutes. If they succeed then two of the symbols of the codex are replaced with the two letters they represent; this is shown to the viewers but not to the team until later in the programme.

Between each round (except after round two) there is a head-to-head challenge where the team is posed a question with a numerical answer. They are each given a numeric keypad, and the person who is furthest from the correct answer is eliminated.

At the end of the show the four people eliminated in the head-to-heads work together to try and decode the codex using the revealed letters. They have three minutes in which to do this, and when they have finished they should have revealed a cryptic clue.

The surviving team member then enters the museum's Reading Room where they are presented with five more artefacts. They must solve the cryptic clue (or whatever the others managed to decipher) to identify what they think is the correct item. They have one minute in which to make their choice. They then take the small box located next to the item back outside. Inside this box is a glass cube revealing whether or not they have won.

The Codex clue describes which of the five artefacts is correct as well as which ones to avoid. Sometimes the clue can be cryptic - for example, in one programme the term "I'm buttercup" referred to a vessel (cup) in the form of a male sheep (ram being an animal that's a 'butter' - i.e. butts things). Similar cryptic crossword-style tricks are meant to lead the solvers astray - e.g. is the word "lead" meant to be pronounced as in the metal or a dog lead?

=== Series 2 ===
The second series, which began airing on 10 November 2007, employs a new format. Two teams of three answer questions for ten points (with some bonus questions and challenges being worth more), the teams remain in one location with only two rounds where one member each goes off to an artefact, there is no codex to solve at the end, and the questions no longer relate to a common period in history. Victory is decided on points alone. The prize is £3,000 and a trophy. The format for each round is as follows:

1. Round 1: There are 10 questions worth 10 points each. Play alternates between the teams and they are allowed to confer.
2. Round 2: A buzzer round. One player from each team is nominated to go to an artefact while the rest of the team answers questions for 10 points each. Incorrectly answered questions are passed to the other team, and for every two correct answers the third member is given a bonus question on the artefact for 20 points. There are 5 bonus questions and the round is over when they have all been answered.
3. Round 3: "Instant expert" round. Earlier in the day the teams are given identical information packs on a particular artefact and had 1 hour in the museum's library to memorise as many facts as possible. Questions are answered individually, and after each question the contestant is read the next question but then nominates an opponent to answer it, the exception being the first question which is given to the captain of the losing team. There are 5 questions per team and they are worth 10 points each.
4. Round 4: One player from each team is nominated to go to an artefact. They each have 60 seconds to try to guess the eight predetermined key words that describe the artefact. Each word is worth 10 points.
5. Final Round: A timed round for each team in turn with play cycling between the team members. When the questions begin the team's score begins to count down and the goal is to give five correct answers before their score reaches zero. The team with the most points left is the ultimate victor.

== Transmissions ==
Series	Start date	End date	Episodes
1	12 November 2006	17 December 2006	6
2	10 November 2007	15 December 2007	6

== International versions ==
Country	Title	Host	Network	First airdate
Israel	הצופן; Ha-Tzofen	Emmanuel Halperin	Channel 1	5 June 2007
Russia	Ночь в Музее; Noch' v Muzee	Andrew Maximov	Russia K	5 February 2011
