= The Worst Jobs in History =

British television series

The Worst Jobs in History is a British television series hosted by Tony Robinson on Channel 4. The second series was shown in March 2006 on History Television in Canada, then in April 2006 on Channel 4 in the UK. The first season is also shown with some regularity on History International. Tony Robinson tries his hand at each of the jobs, ultimately nominating which one he thought was the worst in each programme.

== First series ==
This was broadcast in 2004 and concentrated on a different historical period per programme: Roman, Anglo-Saxon, Medieval, Tudor, Stuarts, Georgian, and Victorian.

Some of the more repulsive or dangerous jobs included fuller, executioner, leech collector, plague burier, rat-catcher, leather tanner, gong farmer, and sin-eater.

There was a one-off special called The Worst Christmas Jobs in History in December 2005. He also commented on several jobs during the runtime of the TV show, one of which was the Knocker-up.

== Second series ==
Broadcast first in March 2006 on The History Channel in Canada, then in April 2006 on Channel 4 in the UK. This series concentrated on particular job settings: urban, royal, industrial, maritime and rural.

== International broadcasters ==
- Australia – The ABC screens this programme on Sunday nights. It generally rates very well, often with 1 million viewers.
- Finland – The Yle screens the programme on Yle Teema.

== Books ==
- Robinson, Tony (2004). The Worst Jobs in History. Boxtree. ISBN 978-0-7522-1533-4.
- Robinson, Tony (2005). The Worst Children's Jobs in History. Macmillan Children's Books. ISBN 978-1-4050-5519-2.

== See also ==
- Dirty Jobs – US television series about disagreeable jobs
- Dirty, Dangerous and Demeaning – concept of a certain form of work
