= Tony Robinson's Romans =

- Genre: Documentary
- Presented by: Tony Robinson
- Country of origin: United Kingdom
- Original language: English
- No. of seasons: 1
- No. of episodes: 4

Production
- Running time: 188 minutes (4 episodes)
- Production company: Channel 4

Original release
- Network: Channel 4
- Release: 20 September – 11 October 2003

Tony Robinson's Romans is a four-part television documentary series created by Tony Robinson about the Roman Empire. It debuted on Channel 4 on 20 September 2003, and aired through 11 October 2003.

This documentary programme is three hours in length, consists of four episodes and makes extensive use of research. The first two episodes portray the life of the Dictator Julius Caesar, while the remaining two episodes are portraits of Emperor Caligula and Emperor Nero. Tony Robinson depicts Caligula from a different perspective than what is normally associated with the "mad emperor", by using various sources that examines his childhood in order to portray him in a better light. The final episode examines Nero in a similar manner.

== Episodes ==
- Episode 1: Julius Caesar I
- Episode 2: Julius Caesar II
- Episode 3: Caligula
- Episode 4: Nero
