= Tony Robinson: Coast to Coast =

- Genre: Documentary
- Presented by: Tony Robinson
- Country of origin: United Kingdom
- Original language: English
- No. of series: 1
- No. of episodes: 6 (list of episodes)

Production
- Production companies: Full Fat TV and Motion Content Group

Original release
- Network: Channel Five
- Release: 17 March – 19 April 2017

Tony Robinson: Coast to Coast is a television programme first aired on Friday 17 March 2017 on Channel Five and hosted by Sir Tony Robinson.

== History ==
The programme follows Sir Tony Robinson walking across the North of England, from the west coast to the east coast following in the footsteps of Alfred Wainwright and his Coast to Coast Walk.

While walking along the path, starting in Cumbria and finishing at Robin Hood Bay in Yorkshire, he shows local history, scenery and the way of life of the local people.

== Episode list ==
No.	Original air date	Episode information	Viewing figures
1	17 March 2017	Starting at St Bees, in Cumbria, Tony visited Honister Slate Mine and makes gourmet scotch eggs.	1.38m
2	21 March 2017	Tony meets sheepfarmers in Borrowdale in the Lake District, visited the only inhabited island on Derwentwater, cooked chutney at Grasmere, watches rare red squirrels and boards a tourist boat from Ullswater.	1.12m
3	29 March 2017	Tony visits the Eden Valley, rides on a historic bus, makes Cumberland sausage, investigates ancient hill top beacons and is part of a mountain rescue.	1.1m
4	5 April 2017	Tony visits the town of Hawes, meets the team to helped save the local production of Wensleydale cheese, visits Leyburn and its cattle market, visits Aysgarth Falls, and meets the Mulker Silver Band in Swaledale.	1.1m
5	12 April 2017	Tony visits the North Yorkshire Moors, taking in the views from a glider at Sutton Bank, visits Rievaulx Abbey, and tastes cider and apples at Ampleforth Abbey.	1.19m
6	19 April 2017	Tony rides a steam train, has a look round the radar base at RAF Fylingdales, visits a local shipyard in Whitby and finished in Robin Hood Bay.	1.18m
