= Tony Robinson's Time Walks =

Tony Robinson's Time Walks is a 2012–14 Australian factual television series hosted by Tony Robinson. The series takes a storytelling approach to document notable localities by foot in Australia and New Zealand.

== Series 1 ==
- Fremantle
- Melbourne
- Hobart
- Bendigo
- Newcastle
- Carlton
- Brisbane
- St Kilda
- Woolloomooloo
- Adelaide

== Series 2 ==
- Kalgoorlie
- Launceston
- Christchurch
- Canberra
- Barossa Valley
- Wellington
- Townsville
- Parramatta
- Geelong
- Alice Springs
