= Britain's Ancient Tracks with Tony Robinson =

British television series

- Presented by: Tony Robinson
- Country of origin: United Kingdom
- Original language: English
- No. of series: 2
- No. of episodes: 7

Original release
- Network: Channel 4
- Release: 15 October 2016 – 14 October 2017

Britain's Ancient Tracks with Tony Robinson is a television documentary series presented by Sir Tony Robinson.

The first series, consisting of three episodes, was broadcast in 2016 by Channel 4.

A second series of four episodes began airing on Channel 4 on 23 September 2017.

== Premise ==
The series follows Tony Robinson as he walks along Britain's ancient tracks, exploring the history and changes along the way.

== Episodes ==
=== Series 1 ===
| Episode Number | Original Date Aired | Episode information | Viewing Figure | Producer | Director | Production company |
|---|---|---|---|---|---|---|
| 1 | Saturday 15 October 2016 | Tony walks along the Icknield Way, an ancient route that starts in Norfolk and finished in Bedfordshire. Along the way he discovers Grime's Graves, mysterious ley lines, a hidden cave of a secret Christian sect and terrifying tales of a demonic dog. | 1.15m | Ben O'Loan | Brian Henry Martin | DoubleBand Films |
| 2 | Saturday 22 October 2016 | Tony walks along The Ridgeway, which runs from Wiltshire to Oxfordshire via Berkshire. Along the way he discovers the truth behind megaliths and Celtic chariots, explores a burial chamber older than the pyramids, and learns about the secrets of the great white horse. | 1.36m | Ben O'Loan | Brian Henry Martin | DoubleBand Films |
| 3 | Saturday 6 November 2016 | Tony walks along the North Downs Way, travelling from Folkestone to Down House in Orpington. | 1.02m | Ben O'Loan | Brian Henry Martin | DoubleBand Films |

=== Series 2 ===
| Episode Number | Original Date Aired | Episode information | Viewing Figure | Producer | Director | Production company |
|---|---|---|---|---|---|---|
| 1 | Saturday 23 September 2017 | Tony Robinson returns for a second series starting on Dartmoor and following in the footsteps of Sir Arthur Conan Doyle. Along the way he will visit a reputed bottomless lake and encountering a four leg beast of Dartmoor. | 0.78m | Ben O'Loan | Brian Henry Martin | DoubleBand Films |
| 2 | Saturday 30 September 2017 | Tony walks Offa's Dyke, an earthwork pathway that runs along the border between England and Wales named after the Mercian King. Along the way he talks about William Wordsworth, takes in the reputed resting place of King Arthur and brings to life stories of the Welsh dragon. | 0.77m | Ben O'Loan | Brian Henry Martin | DoubleBand Films |
| 3 | Saturday 7 October 2017 | Tony walks along the Derbyshire Portway, an ancient pre-historic trackway that is situated in the Peak District. Along the way he investigates a prehistoric shark tooth, an abandoned railway tunnel before visiting Mountain Cottage near Middleton-by-Wirksworth where D.H. Lawrence and his German born wife Frieda had lived, before they were forced away by locals accusing them of being spies. | 0.72m | Ben O'Loan | Brian Henry Martin | DoubleBand Films |
| 4 | Saturday 14 October 2017 | Tony walks along Dere Street, a Roman road that ran from York (Eboracum) into central Scotland. He visits Hadrian's Wall, has a go at Celtic Horns and has a go at mixing up medieval potions. | 0.66m | Ben O'Loan | Brian Henry Martin | DoubleBand Films |
