= Man on Earth =

- Genre: Documentary
- Directed by: Tom Stubberfield
- Presented by: Tony Robinson
- Country of origin: United Kingdom
- Original language: English
- No. of series: 1
- No. of episodes: 4

Production
- Executive producers: David Brady; Philip Clarke
- Running time: 48 minutes

Original release
- Network: Channel 4
- Release: 7 December – 28 December 2009

Man on Earth is a four-part British documentary television series presented by Tony Robinson. The programme documents the effects of climate change across 200,000 years of human history. The series premiered 7 December 2009 on Channel 4 with 1.4 million viewers. Accompanying Robinson to help explain the science are archaeologist Jago Cooper and climate modeller Joy Singarayer.

== Episodes ==
No.	Title	Original release date	Viewers (millions)
1	"The Triumph of Homo Sapiens"	7 December 2009	1.4 (6%)
2	"The Birth of Civilisation"	14 December 2009	1.27 (5.6%)
3	"Killer Climate"	21 December 2009	1.27 (5.2%)
4	"The Modern World"	28 December 2009	1.2 (4.9%)

== Reception ==
Sam Wollaston of The Guardian said the programme is "interesting and intelligently done – no embarrassing reconstructions with hairy chaps brandishing spears and grunting". However, Jeremy Clay of the Leicester Mercury felt that the programme covered much of the same material as the BBC's The Incredible Human Journey, which aired earlier in the year. Clay was also not confident in the choice of Tony Robinson as the presenter saying that he "exudes enthusiasm rather than authority, and delivered some of his facts to camera with the air of a man who's only recently heard them himself".

== See also ==
- Current effects of global warming
- Climatology
- The Weather of the Future
