= Andrea U'Ren =

American writer

- Born: 1968 (age 56–57); Palo Alto, California, U.S.
- Occupation: Author; illustrator
- Education: Rhode Island School of Design; Cooper Union
- Genre: Children's literature
- Children: 1

Andrea U'Ren (born 1968) also known as Andrea Uren and A. U'Ren is an American author and illustrator of many children's picture books. Her work has garnered several awards, including a Silver Medal from the Society of Illustrators, NY, International Reading Association's Best Book of 2004, Parents' Choice Gold award winner and a reading by Daniel Pinkwater and Scott Simon on National Public Radio of her book Mary Smith about a "knocker-up" also illustrated by Ms. U'Ren (Farrar, Straus and Giroux, 2003) . U'Ren's other titles include Pugdog (Farrar Straus and Giroux, 2001) a gender bending tale, One Potato, Two Potato written by Cynthia DeFelice (Farrar Straus and Giroux, 2006), Stormy's Hat, Just Right for a Railroad Man written by Eric Kimmel (Farrar Straus and Giroux, 2008) and "Feeding the Sheep" written by Leda Schubert (Farrar Straus and Giroux, 2010).

U'Ren was born in Palo Alto, California. She first attended Rhode Island School of Design from 1986–87, then transferred to and earned a bachelor's degree in fine art from The Cooper Union, New York, New York in 1991. U'Ren also attended the Whitney Museum of American Art's Independent Study Program within the Artist's Studio department from 1991-1992. Her art (both fine and illustrations) has been shown in many galleries and group shows. U'Ren currently lives with her son, Sebastian, in Portland, Oregon. The name Uren, sometimes changed to U'Ren, is of Cornish origin.
