= Catastrophe (2008 TV series) =

- Genre: Documentary
- Presented by: Tony Robinson
- Country of origin: United Kingdom
- Original language: English
- No. of series: 1
- No. of episodes: 5

Original release
- Network: Channel 4
- Release: 24 November – 22 December 2008

Catastrophe is a five-part British documentary television series telling the story of the catastrophic events that shaped planet Earth. It is presented by Tony Robinson and was first aired on Channel 4 on 24 November 2008. The series producer was Stephen Marsh with researcher Rhodri Jones.

The series equates Geological time to a clock face to aid understanding of the vast timescales involved

== Episodes ==
No.	Title	Original release date
1	"Birth of the Planet"	24 November 2008
The first episode explores the most violent event in the history of the Earth when, four and half billion years ago, it collided with another planet, Theia, helping create the unique circumstances for life on Earth. It includes contributions from Bill K. Hartmann who first convinced the scientific mainstream that the Giant impact created both the Moon and the Earth's 23° tilt. The programme also covers the last continuing Lunar Surface experiment from the Apollo program. NASA engineer Jerry Wiant's Lunar Laser Ranging measures the increasing distance between the Moon and the McDonald Observatory on Earth.
2	"Snowball Earth"	1 December 2008
An exploration of the evidence behind the controversial theory of Snowball Earth. Tony Robinson opens the episode with "... temperatures plummeted, ice spread down from the poles. It encased the planet in a layer thousands of metres thick. A snowball earth." Tony speaks of proof that "meant only one thing" and one of the experts who speaks on the program (around 18 minutes) says "proven that glaciers were on the equator" and "if you have ice at the equator then the whole of the globe must have been covered by ice, a wholly white planet".
3	"Planet of Fire"	8 December 2008
An exploration of the Permian extinction, the largest ever when, 250 million years ago, 95% of life was destroyed. The evidence points to an eruption of the Siberian Traps in Eastern Russia.
4	"Asteroid Strike"	15 December 2008
This programme follows the trail of clues leading to the extinction of non-avian dinosaurs, 65 million years ago. Iridium and shocked quartz found at the K–T boundary (Cretaceous–Paleogene boundary) are investigated which leads to the belief that an asteroid strike on the Yucatán Peninsula was responsible for the extinction.
5	"Survival Earth"	22 December 2008
This episode considers the events over the last 75,000 years that wiped out many of present-day humans ancestors. Super-volcanoes, ice ages and cosmic impacts have all had a malign effect on the development of the human race and the evidence is that such events will continue to be a threat in the future. In describing the Younger Dryas impact hypothesis, archaeologist Ken Tankersley investigated evidence from Sheriden Cave in Ohio, and NASA scientist Peter Schultz performed experiments at the Ames Vertical Gun Range. The programme also includes contributions from Stephen Oppenheimer.
