= The Friendly Guide to Music =

2006 book and CD

- Author: Tony Robinson
- Genre: Music
- ISBN: 978-0-340-94019-8

The Friendly Guide to Music by Darren Henley is a book and CD about classical music published in 2006. That year, English actor and presenter Tony Robinson presented a radio series of the same name on Classic FM.

It covers the period from early music, Medieval and Renaissance music, to the modern era, 20th-century classical music, contemporary classical music, and 21st-century classical music, and its objective is to create a guide to music that is not needlessly complex.
