= Walking Through History =

British television documentary series

Walking Through History is a British television documentary history programme that ran for four series on Channel 4 and was presented by actor Tony Robinson. It first aired in March 2013.

== History ==
Channel 4 commissioned the series Walking Through History as a new vehicle for actor and comedian Tony Robinson after the cancellation of Time Team.

The programme was devised as a 60-mile walk, with each series aiming to be made up of four parts, with each walk highlighting history from different eras along the path taken.

== Episode list ==
=== Series 1 ===
Episode number	Episode title	Original date aired	Episode information	Viewing figure	Director	Executive Producer/s	Series Producer
1	The Birth of Industry	30 March 2013	Tony visits the Peak District, travelling down the Derwent Valley and recounting the change brought about by the Industrial Revolution and the role played by Richard Arkwright. Tony also visits Haddon Hall and Cromford Canal.	1.26m	Tom Cholmondeley	Philip Clarke / Simon Raikes	David Johnson
2	Frontline Dorset	6 April 2013	Tony visits Dorset walking along the Jurassic Coast exposing the county's World War II history. He starts the walk on Chesil Beach, finishing in Swanage.	^	Mike Wadding	Philip Clarke / Simon Raikes	David Johnson
3	The Tudor Way	13 April 2013	Tony crosses the Weald in Kent to the South Downs in East Sussex visiting locations with connections to Henry VIII. Starting at Penshurst Place he discovers the fate of the 3rd Duke of Buckingham, before following secret paths to Hever Castle. He visits sites that were home to the Tudor iron and beer industries, before finishing in Lewes.	1.1m	Owen Rodd	Philip Clarke / Simon Raikes	David Johnson
4	Battle in the Glens	20 April 2013	Tony visits the Kintail region of the north western Highlands. While there he examines the story of the Jacobite risings, visits Iron Age dwellings in Shiel Bridge and a rebuilt castle at Eilean Donan before finishing at Glen Shiel.	1.11m	David Johnson	Philip Clarke / Simon Raikes	David Johnson

^Not available as not in the Top 30 programs on Channel 4 that week.

=== Series 2 ===
Episode number	Episode title	Original date aired	Episode information	Viewing figure	Director	Executive Producer/s	Series Producer
1	The Path to Stonehenge	23 November 2013	Tony walks 45 miles across Wiltshire, starting in Avebury and finishing at Stonehenge. Along the way he visits Silbury Hill and the West Kennett Long Barrow, tries his hand at dowsing ley lines and walking the processional avenue towards Stonehenge.	^	Andy Robbins	Philip Clarke	Owen Rodd
2	Rome in the Lakes	30 November 2013	Tony followed the steps taken by the Roman legions, by walking from Penrith to Ambleside in the Lake District then onto Ravenglass. On the way he saw the history of 300 years of occupation including buildings and lead mines.	^	Nick Gillam-Smith	Philip Clarke	Owed Rodd
3	Smugglers Cornwall	14 December 2013	Tony walks from Plymouth to Falmouth following in the footsteps of Cornwall's smugglers. He visits secluded harbours and coves where the illicit trade of smuggling took place and finds out that in 1780 half of the brandy drunk in Britain was smuggled through Cornwall.	1.37m	Andy Robbins	Philip Clarke	Owen Rodd

^Not available as not in the Top 30 programs on Channel 4 that week.

=== Series 3 ===
Episode number	Episode title	Original date aired	Episode information	Viewing figure	Director	Executive Producer/s	Series Producer
1	The Way to Wigan Pier	8 February 2014	Tony walks from Liverpool to Wigan, conveying stories regarding the construction of the Leeds and Liverpool Canal, visits a Jam factory and Aintree Racecourse finishing at Wigan Pier.	1.37m	Nick Gillam-Smith	Philip Clarke	Owen Rodd
2	The Dark Age of Northumbria	15 February 2014	Tony explores the ancient kingdom of Northumbria starting in Melrose in Scotland before finishing on Holy Island. He follows in the footsteps of Saint Cuthbert travelling through Tweed Valley and Cheviot Hills.	1.51m	Michael Waterhouse	Philip Clarke	Owen Rodd
3	North Norfolk	22 February 2014	Tony visits North Norfolk conveying how landowners had restricted the vestiges of changes that had occurred across the rest of Britain during the Industrial Revolution. Along the way he visits Cromer Pier, disused railway lines, Sandringham and Salt marshes.	1.41m	Owen Rodd	Philip Clarke	Owen Rodd

=== Series 4 ===
Episode number	Episode title	Original date aired	Episode information	Viewing figure	Director	Executive Producer/s	Series Producer
1	Bronte Country	26 October 2014	Tony starts out in the city of Bradford, walking through the South Pennines to Haworth in West Yorkshire, the home of the Brontë Sisters. He visits their birthplace in Thornton and recalls tales along the way of their childhoods with the help of Bronte experts.	^	James Franklin	Philip Clarke	Owen Rodd
2	Victoria and Albert's Highland Fling	2 November 2014	Tony visits the Highlands to examine the impact of Queen Victoria and Prince Albert's visit in 1844, as well as tell the story of the clearances. Along the way he visits the Cairngorms National Park, stopping in Pitlochry, the Pass of Killiecrankie and finished at Balmoral Castle.	1m	Peter Gauvain	Philip Clarke	Owen Rodd
3	The Norman Conquest of Pembrokeshire	8 November 2014	Tony walks through the south west of Wales recalling the long hard guerilla war between the Welsh and the Normans. He uses a guide written by the historical figure Gerald of Wales while walking along the Pembrokeshire Coastal Path.	1.09m	James Buchanan	Philip Clarke	Owen Rodd
4	Nazi Occupation: The Channel Islands	15 November 2014	Tony walks through the Channel Islands of Jersey and Guernsey recalling the arrival of German troops during World War II, the arrival of secret British Commandos and beaches still with bunkers and machine gun posts.	^	James Franklin	Philip Clarke	Owen Rodd
5	King John's Ruin: The Peak District	22 November 2014	Tony walks from Sherwood Forest to the Peak District to discover the real King John as the 800-year anniversary of Magna Carta loomed near. He visits the remains of Laxton Castle and explores the myth of Robin Hood and how its skewed peoples image of him.	1.08m	Peter Gauvain	Philip Clarke	Owen Rodd
6	England's Last Battle: The West Country	29 November 2014	Tony recalls the story of the Duke of Monmouth, Charles II illegitimate son and his attempted rebellion against King James II. He starts his trail on the Jurassic Coast at Lyme Regis and ending on the Somerset Levels, following in the footsteps of the young Duke.	1.05m	Owen Rodd	Philip Clarke	Owen Rodd

^Not available as not in the Top 30 programs on Channel 4 that week.
