= Sam on Boffs' Island =

1972 British children's educational TV series

- Genre: Schools programme
- Starring: Tony Robinson
- Country of origin: United Kingdom
- Original language: English
- No. of episodes: 20

Original release
- Network: BBC One
- Release: 18 September 1972

Sam on Boffs' Island is a British educational television series, made by the BBC, and aimed at developing the reading skills of 6- to 8-year-olds.

First broadcast in 1972 as part of the Words and Pictures strand, it was one of the first television appearances of Tony Robinson.

== Plot ==
Robinson played the character Sam, who is magically transported to Boffs' Island when he is eating his breakfast cereal in the morning. Each episode featured a 'real life' segment designed to encourage young children to read through storytelling. Other segments were animated.

== Characters ==
The Boff characters are puppets, who were portrayed by several voice actors including Charles Collingwood. Miriam Margolyes (later to co-star with Robinson in Blackadder) played Sam's mother. The Boffs were stop-motion animated except when they appeared simultaneously with Robinson, in which cases they were hand-operated.

== Production ==
The scriptwriter for the series was children's author Michael Rosen. Smallfilms, the production company of Oliver Postgate and Peter Firmin, provided some still video sequences.

== Release ==
In all, 20 episodes were made, and the series was repeated throughout the 1970s as part of the BBC's schools service. It was also the series that brought together Smallfilms with Sandra Kerr and John Faulkner (thanks to Michael Rosen's work with Kerr and Faulkner in Ewan MacColl's Critics' Group). Postgate, Firmin, Kerr and Faulkner went on to make Bagpuss together.
