= Tony Robinson's Crime and Punishment =

- Genre: Documentary
- Starring: Tony Robinson
- Country of origin: United Kingdom
- Original language: English
- No. of seasons: 1
- No. of episodes: 4

Production
- Running time: 60 minutes
- Production company: Dragonfly

Original release
- Network: Channel 4
- Release: 1 June – 22 June 2008

Tony Robinson's Crime and Punishment is a British documentary for Channel 4.

In a four-part series, Tony Robinson journeys to discover the origins of our laws and what we do to people who break them. From trials by boiling water to the emergence of our modern democracy, the two-thousand year long development of the legal system remains unfinished today.

It aired on Australian screens in 2009 on ABC1.

== Episodes ==
No.	Title	Original release date
1	"Feud Glorious Feud"	1 June 2008
We journey back to the Dark Ages, before laws were written down and trials involved harsh physical ordeals with boiling water and red hot pokers. But by the end of this period, the Saxons had created the very first sophisticated legal systems of courts and juries some 200 years before they were formally introduced.
2	"Guilty As Charred"	8 June 2008
The period up to and after the Norman invasion was perhaps the most turbulent in the history of law. But in the 150 years from 1066, the legal system was transformed. This period saw the signing of Magna Carta and the establishment of the three major planks of a modern legal system: independent judges, trial by jury, and English common law.
3	"New King on the Block"	15 June 2008
The battle over freedom of speech and how the monarch finally lost its power, and its head. As crucial as Magna Carta, the introduction of the Bill of Rights in 1688 saw Parliament and politicians now assume complete domination over the monarchy for good.
4	"Have I Got Noose for You"	22 June 2008
Programme 4 examines the huge escalation in the amount of law-making with the rise of industrialised society in the eighteenth century. And with thinkers such as Voltaire, Locke and especially Jeremy Bentham, the modern ideas of prison, reform and rehabilitation for offenders begin to emerge.
