= John Topham (photographer) =

British documentary photographer (1908–1992)

- Portrait of photographer John Topham, 1936
- Born: 1908
- Died: 1992 (aged 84); Edenbridge, Kent, England, UK.
- Occupation: Photographer
- Years active: 1927–1973

John Topham (1908–1992) was an English social documentary photographer.

He worked steadily from 1927 to 1973, documenting the "ordinary way of life of ordinary people...the little things of life – the way it really was." He is particularly noted for his photographs taken during the World War II era – with some appearing in Life magazine and one on display in the Imperial War Museum He amassed 121,228 negatives including 20,000 glass negatives of his earliest work.

The TopFoto collection in Edenbridge, Kent, holds about 122,000 of his pictures, including 20,000 glass negatives. Topham worked closely with a Kentish Times photographer, Tom Fassam. Many of his prints of agricultural and rural interest are also on permanent loan to the Museum of English Rural Life in Reading, courtesy of the TopFoto Archive.

== Early career ==
John Topham began his working life as a policeman in the East End of London in the 1920s, where he carried a camera and made photographs of daily life in Kent, especially around the Sidcup area. A photograph of Mary Smith, a knocker-up, was his first published photograph. He sold it for five pounds, a week's wages, to the Daily Mirror newspaper, and decided to become a freelance photographer.

== World War II ==
During the early part of the war, Topham, or 'Top' as he was known, had a contract with Life magazine as well as being a freelancer. He would regularly get calls from national newspapers directing him to photograph areas of war damage or action.

His most famous image shows the children of hop pickers watching the aerial dogfights of the Battle of Britain. It was used in a propaganda campaign alongside the slogan "Help England and It Won't Happen Here" which helped to convince millions of Americans to join the war against Nazi Germany. In 2009, the image was used to publicise Outbreak – the major Imperial War Museum exhibition commemorating seventy years since the start of World War II. In the same year, it was appropriated for use on the cover design of the Imperial War Museum book Outbreak: 1939: The World Goes to War.

Topham joined the Royal Air Force as a photographer in 1941 and was soon drafted into Intelligence. One of the famous images of Winston Churchill is by Topham. After the war, he refused offers of staff jobs in the RAF to become a freelance photographer again, working mainly in South East England and Scotland.

== Death ==
Topham died at his home in Edenbridge in 1992. According to the British Association of Picture Libraries and Agencies, he sent his very last dispatch to the obituaries section of The Daily Telegraph: "Thanks everybody for a wonderful life, John."

== Exhibitions ==
A show of Topham's work, called Memory Lane: 1933 – 1950: The Work of Photographer John Topham, was first shown in the Impressions Gallery in York in 1982, supported by the Arts Council of England. His work is described as justly famous for the way it captures the moment. In 2009, it was re-displayed in the TopFoto Gallery in Edenbridge and is now on permanent exhibition at the gallery.

In 2013, Topham was to be the subject of a BBC documentary for The One Show.
