= Stay Tooned! (TV programme) =

Television series

- Presented by: Tony Robinson
- Country of origin: United Kingdom
- Original language: English
- No. of series: 7
- No. of episodes: 86

Production
- Producer: BBC
- Running time: 25–30 minutes

Original release
- Network: BBC
- Release: 17 March 1990 – 11 May 1996

Related
- Rolf Harris Cartoon Time

Stay Tooned! is a British television programme which aired on BBC from 17 March 1990 to 11 May 1996. The programme is presented by Tony Robinson, in which he discusses in detail and explains in depth cartoon characters, and the people and studios behind the cartoons, as well as looks over the history of cartoons.

Unlike Rolf Harris Cartoon Time, in which Harris performed as filler between the cartoons, Tony Robinson tried to provide greater detail about the particular topic on which he would focus each week. This meant that the range of depth of the series went beyond run of the mill classics, and on occasion featured more obscure cartoons including Betty Boop, Animal Farm, and those made by independent producers.

== Censored toons ==
For one of the episodes, they looked at censored cartoons from over the years and included broadcast of Tin Pan Alley Cats and Angel Puss.

== Episodes ==
Over the course of each year, episodes would broadcast when appropriate slots were available on Saturday or Sunday Tea time slot.

- 1990: 22 episodes
- 1991: 20 episodes
- 1992: 13 episodes
- 1993: 12 episodes
- 1994: 6 episodes
- 1995: 8 episodes
- 1996: 13 April – 11 May 1996 5 Episodes

20 Episodes were repeated on Sunday Mornings on BBC Two during 1997.
