= Knocker-up =

Job of waking people up

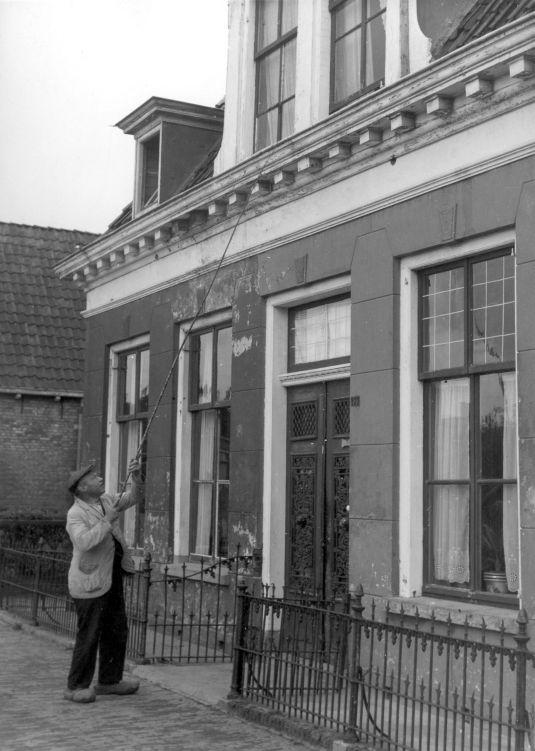
A knocker-up in Leeuwarden, 1947

A knocker-up or knocker-upper had the job of rousing sleeping people so they could get to work on time. The role started during the Industrial Revolution, in Britain, the Netherlands, Ireland and some other countries, when alarm clocks were neither cheap nor reliable. By the 1940s and 1950s, the job had more or less entirely died out, although it still continued in some pockets of industrial England until the early 1970s.

The knocker-up used a baton or short, heavy stick to knock on the clients' doors or a long and light stick, often made of bamboo, to reach windows on higher floors. One famous photograph shot in 1931 by John Topham shows Mary Smith in East London using a pea-shooter. In return for the task, the knocker-up would be paid a few pence a week. Some knocker-ups would not leave a client's window until they were sure that the client had been awakened, while others simply tapped several times and then moved on.

Many knocker-uppers were night owls who slept during the day and woke around 4pm, thus not requiring a knocker-upper themselves.

A knocker-up would also use a 'snuffer-outer', a tool term possibly derived from lamplighter terminology, to rouse the sleeping. This implement was used to put out gas lamps which were lit at dusk and then needed to be extinguished at dawn.

There were large numbers of people carrying out the job, especially in larger industrial towns such as Manchester. Generally the job was done by elderly men and pregnant women but sometimes police constables supplemented their pay by performing the task during early morning patrols.

Molly Moore (daughter of Mary Smith, also a knocker-up and the protagonist of a children's picture book by Andrea U'Ren called Mary Smith) claims to have been the last knocker-up to have been employed as such. Both Smith and Moore used a long rubber tube to shoot dried peas at their clients' windows.

In Ferryhill, County Durham, miners' houses had slate boards set into their outside walls onto which the miners would write their shift details in chalk so that the colliery-employed knocker-up could wake them at the correct time. These boards were known as "knocky-up boards" or "wake-up slates".

== In media ==
Charles Dickens's Great Expectations includes a brief description of a knocker-up. Hindle Wakes, a play written by Stanley Houghton and then a movie (of the same title) directed by Maurice Elvey, similarly involves one.

The job of a knocker-up is documented and explained in the episode "The Industrial Revolution" of the television series The Worst Jobs in History.

A knocker-up appears at the very beginning of the musical The Wind Road Boys by Paul Flynn. He walks along a group of children who are all holding slates with a number chalked upon them. The number on the slates denotes at what hour the householder wished to be woken in the morning and he calls and raps on the windows with his stick accordingly.

In Walter Greenwood's novel Love on the Dole, a knocker-up is featured. He wakes the Hardcastle family and their neighbours up by tapping on their upper windows with a long pole that has wires hanging from the end.
