= Tony Robinson =

English actor (born 1946)

Sir Tony Robinson
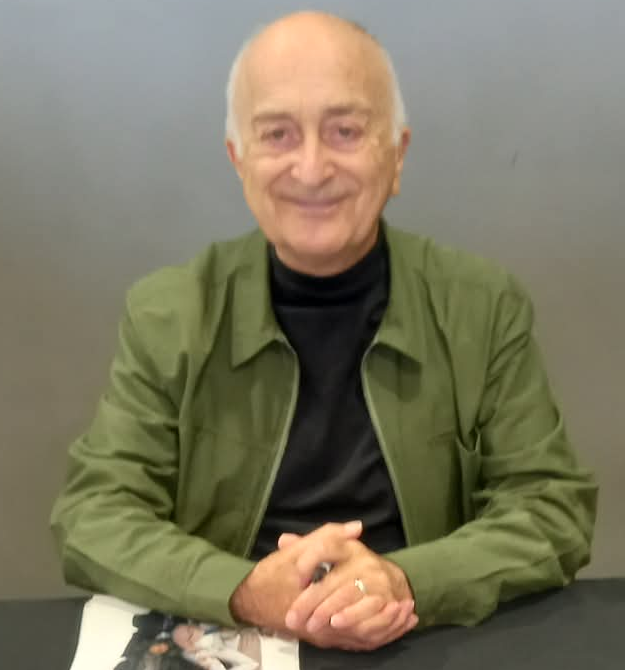
- Robinson in 2026
- Born: Anthony Robinson; 15 August 1946 (age 80); Homerton, London, England
- Education: Central School of Speech and Drama
- Occupations: Actor; author; broadcaster; political activist
- Years active: 1971–present
- Political party: Labour (1974–2019, 2020–present)
- Spouses: Barbara Henshall (m. 1969; div. 1973); Mary Shepherd (div. 1992); Louise Hobbs (m. 2011)
- Children: 2
- Tony Robinson's voice from the BBC programme Desert Island Discs, 3 July 2011.

Sir Anthony Robinson (born 15 August 1946) is an English actor, author, broadcaster, and political activist. He played Baldrick in the BBC television sitcom Blackadder and has presented many historical documentaries, including the Channel 4 series Time Team and The Worst Jobs in History. He has written 16 children's books.

As a member of the Labour Party, Robinson was knighted in the 2013 Queen's Birthday Honours for his public and political service.

== Early life ==
Robinson was born on 15 August 1946 in Homerton, London, to Phyllis (1916–2005) and Leslie Robinson (1913–1989). His parents were from working-class Hackney backgrounds; his father was a civil servant and council employee who served in the RAF, and his mother, an audio-typist, served in the WAAF. He attended the private Woodford Green Preparatory School and Wanstead County High grammar school. He passed four O-levels (English language, English literature, history, and geography) and went on to study for A-levels, but did not complete them and decided to study at a drama school instead. Too young to attend the Royal Academy of Dramatic Art, Robinson enrolled at the Central School of Speech and Drama in 1963, graduating in 1966.

Robinson had his first acting role at the age of 13, as a member of Fagin's band in the original production of the musical Oliver!, including a stint as the Artful Dodger when the boy playing the role failed to turn up. Over the next five years, he appeared in a number of West End theatre shows, and in film, and television.

Through genealogical research, Robinson found that one of his great-great-great-grandmothers, Julia Levy, was Jewish; his father, unaware of this ancestry, had been beaten by Fascists in the East End of London in the 1930s who assumed he was a Jew.

== Acting career ==
=== Early career ===
After drama school, he spent four years in repertory theatre most notably at the West Yorkshire Playhouse in Leeds. Robinson won an Arts Council bursary to work as a director at the Midlands Arts Centre, Birmingham, and founded the Avon Touring Company, a Bristol-based community theatre company, with writer David Illingworth. He played a small role as student doctor Grace in the 1972–73 series of Doctor In Charge.

Robinson appeared in the 1974–75 season at Chichester Festival Theatre, as Angel Chicago in the nativity musical Follow The Star. In the 1975 season, he appeared as Hovstad in Henrik Ibsen's An Enemy of the People. In 1976, he appeared as Feste in Twelfth Night, and as Majorin in Monsieur Perrichon's Travels.

In 1972, Robinson starred in the children's educational programme Sam on Boffs' Island and was later a presenter on Play Away. He also appeared in the award-winning Horizon documentary Joey, and in the title role in the BBC production of The Miracle of Brother Humphrey. He also appeared in the film Brannigan starring John Wayne, in which he shared two speaking part scenes with Wayne, playing a motorcycle courier who is pushed off a quay into the Thames by Wayne. He was also one of the team in the Channel 4 comedy/satirical series Who Dares Wins in the early/mid-1980s. He was also seen in The Rag Trade's 1970s reboot.

=== Blackadder period (1983–1989) ===
Robinson came to prominence in 1983 for his role in the British historical sitcom Blackadder, as Edmund Blackadder's dogsbody Baldrick. In the first series, broadcast as The Black Adder, he was quite astute, while his master was an idiot. Later series (Blackadder II, Blackadder the Third, Blackadder Goes Forth) moved the duo through history and switched the relationship: the Edmund Blackadder of Blackadder II was a brilliant schemer, whereas Baldrick had devolved into a buffoon whose catchphrase was "I have a cunning plan".

In addition to his acting on Blackadder, Robinson also wrote and narrated several Jackanory-style children's programmes, encouraged by Richard Curtis. Programmes in this style included Tales From Fat Tulip's Garden (continued in Fat Tulip Too), Odysseus: The Greatest Hero of Them All (a retelling of the Iliad and the Odyssey) and Blood and Honey (tales from the Old Testament, filmed on location).

Robinson also performed within the BBC Radio 4 comedy Delve Special (1984–1987), written by Tony Sarchet.

=== After Blackadder (1989–1999) ===
After Blackadder, Robinson became the narrator and one of the lead actors for the British animated series Nellie the Elephant, based on the song of the same name. The series ran from 1989 until 1991 and was screened on Children's ITV.

Robinson also provided voice-over for the cartoon short Free-Ranger, an English child-scripted arts-funded production in 1989. Robinson also presented the early-Saturday evening series Stay Tooned for BBC 1, which featured a selection of classic Warner Bros. and MGM cartoons. In 1989, after attending a pantomime at Tyndale Baptist Church, Bristol, which was based on the Robin Hood story but featuring Maid Marian as the lead role, he created the children's comedy series Maid Marian and her Merry Men, a loose retelling of the legend of Robin Hood in which he appeared as the Sheriff of Nottingham. Four series were broadcast on BBC1 from 1989 until 1994. In 1989 he appeared as "Shlomo Denkoviz" in an episode of Bergerac, entitled "My Name's Sergeant Bergerac" (Series 8, Episode 2).

Also in 1994, Robinson played a minor part in an episode of the television series Minder, called "One Flew Over the Parents' Nest", in which he played a character called "Willie the Weed".

=== 1999–2010 ===
In 1999, Robinson returned to star as Baldrick in a one-off short film in the Blackadder series, made to celebrate the new millennium. Entitled Blackadder: Back & Forth, it was screened in the Millennium Dome throughout 2000 and was later aired on BBC One in 2002.

Robinson also contributed the voiceover for the television series Airline screened from 1999 and focusing on the daily routine of EasyJet staff at a selection of airports. The series was made for ITV and is often repeated today on Sky Real Lives, Sky One, Sky Two, Sky Three (now Sky Mix), and ITV2. Robinson worked as the narrator for six of the remaining nine series until 2006 when it ended.

Tony Robinson's Cunning Night Out, a largely improvised one-man stage show, followed in early 2005 and included a mix of the many themes from his career for which Robinson is famous. The show was later released on DVD.

In addition to telling his own stories, Robinson narrated the abridged audiobook versions of Terry Pratchett's Discworld novels. Nigel Planer, Celia Imrie, and Stephen Briggs narrated the unabridged versions. He also provided the voicing for several characters in the videogame Discworld. He followed on this Discworld work by playing a role in the live action television dramatisation of Hogfather, broadcast on Sky over the Christmas season in 2006.

Robinson also presented Classic FM's Friendly Guide to Classical Music which aired on a Sunday at 4pm. The whole 16-episode series was repeated on 26 December 2006. He revealed on the BBC Radio 2 feature "Tracks of My Years" that his favourite songs are: "I Can Help" by Billy Swan, "Bleeding Love" by Leona Lewis, "Chasing Cars" by Snow Patrol, "Beautiful" by Christina Aguilera, "Unfinished Sympathy" by Massive Attack, "Tangled Up In Blue" by Bob Dylan, "Shoulda Woulda Coulda" by Beverley Knight, "This Woman's Work" by Maxwell, "He's So Fine" by the Chiffons, and "Falling Slowly" by the Frames.

In 2007, Robinson narrated television advertisements for Honda, in the humorous style of Tales From Fat Tulip's Garden. The advertisements feature plastic cars with expressive faces (similar to Thomas the Tank Engine). He also did voiceovers for cleaning products Domestos and Vanish from 2007 until 2009. Also in 2007, Robinson visited 30 towns in Britain and Ireland with A Cunning Night Out.

In July 2009, Robinson appeared in the light-hearted BBC1 series Hotel Babylon as a sly hit-man named Arthur Barnes. The character is knocked unconscious by a flying bottle expertly lobbed by the hotel manager during a showdown in the lobby.

=== 2010–present ===
In September 2013, Robinson played the Fool in the Gala Performance of William Shakespeare's King Lear at the Old Vic in London, directed by Jonathan Miller.

In 2014, Robinson played the title role in a touring production of The Hypochondriac, Richard Bean's new translation of Molière's Le malade imaginaire, directed by Lindsay Posner.

In 2016 and 2017, Robinson played the antagonist 'Daddy' in Man Down alongside Greg Davies and Roisin Conaty.

In 2019, Robinson guested in the episode 'The Dig' in Series 5 of the ITV comedy Plebs as an Archaeologist called Daedalus Graeco.

== History presenter ==
=== Beginnings and Time Team (1994–2001) ===
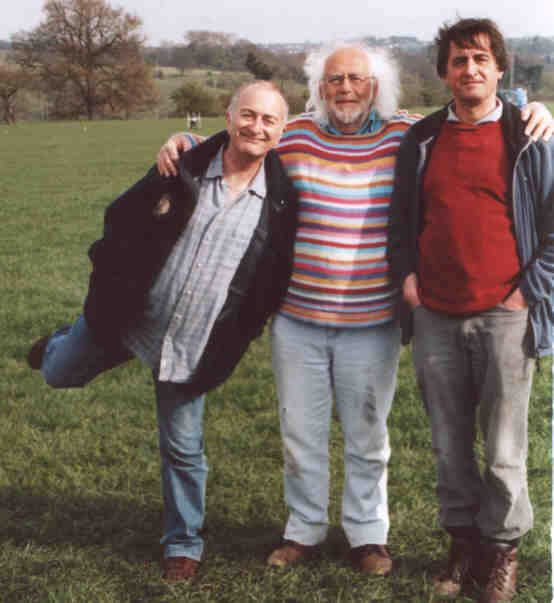
Tony Robinson (left), Mick Aston and Guy de la Bédoyère on a Time Team shoot in 2007.

In 1994, Robinson began presenting Time Team, a TV programme devoted to archaeological investigations limited to three days. The series spanned 20 years, and included 59 one-off specials, which paved the way for his later history presenting career.

In 2005 Exeter University conferred an honorary doctorate on Robinson, and honorary professorships on principal presenter Mick Aston and producer Tim Taylor, to reflect its great appreciation for what Time Team has done for the public understanding of archaeology in the UK. In the 2011 episode "Hitler's Island Fortress", Robinson described himself as an amateur archaeologist.

=== Broader history presenting (2001–2012) ===
From 2001, Robinson branched out into other history documentary series, including the series Fact or Fiction (which debunked historical myths and gave the true story), followed by Romans in 2003 and the highly successful The Worst Jobs in History in 2006, researching and re-enacting some of the more horrible jobs of the past millennium. He also took this show on tour around the country along with an autobiographical question and answer session. This first series was followed by The Worst Christmas Jobs in History in December 2005 and then a second series of The Worst Jobs in History on Channel 4 in April 2006.

Following this, he presented one-off specials such as Britain's Real Monarch (2004) and The Real Da Vinci Code (2005).

With Channel 4 in 2005, Robinson presented a special called Tony Robinson's Titanic Adventure where he joined director James Cameron on his final dive to the wreck of the RMS Titanic. Also with Channel 4, he presented Tony Robinson's Crime and Punishment, Catastrophe and Man on Earth focusing on humanity's struggle with climate change in the past 200,000 years. Unexplained with Tony Robinson was first broadcast on Channel 4 in December 2008. In this series, Robinson investigates paranormal phenomena combining the fields of archaeology, parapsychology, history and spiritualism to investigate paranormal evidence. He also presented The Doomsday Code in 2006.

From 1 September 2010, Robinson hosted a series on the National Geographic Channel called Birth of Britain which was repeated on Channel 4 beginning in January 2011. In 2011 he also presented Gods and Monsters.

Tony Robinson Explores Australia was first broadcast in the first half of 2012. Filmed in High Definition, the series roughly follows a chronology from the earliest sightings of Terra Australis Incognita through to the present with each era defined by a theme rather than equal blocks of time.

From 10 September 2012, Robinson hosted a series on History Channel called Tony Robinson's Time Walks. The series uncovers stories that shaped the character of various cities and suburbs around Australia, including Fremantle, Melbourne, Hobart, Woolloomooloo, Bendigo, Newcastle, Carlton, Brisbane, St Kilda, Adelaide, Canberra, Kalgoorlie, Townsville and Launceston. He also went to Christchurch, New Zealand. In 2015, Robinson continued his history presenting in Australia with "Tour of Duty", again on History Channel.

During October 2012, it was announced that Time Team would be cancelled after nearly 20 years on television. Tara Conlan from The Guardian called the show "television history". When talking about the successful run of the show, Robinson said, "Not many performers are given the privilege of featuring in two iconic TV series—but I've been lucky." The show's ratings were falling, causing Channel 4 to pursue an alternative "innovative" approach to historical documentary programming.

=== Post-Time Team and presenting other history documentaries (2012–present) ===
Between 2012 and 2014, Robinson presented a series of programmes for Channel 4 called Walking Through History. It featured Robinson hiking through iconic British landscapes, including the Cairngorms, the Jurassic Coast and Stonehenge. At least 16 hour-long episodes were aired, in four series. A further three-part series called Britain's Ancient Tracks with Tony Robinson was shown on Channel 4 in 2016. A second four-part series of Britain's Ancient Tracks was aired in 2017.

In 2014, Robinson presented a history of The Great War titled Tony Robinson's World War 1. He also presented The Real Mill, revealing the true history to the Channel 4 series, The Mill.

In 2015, Robinson presented a three-hour-long programmes for Discovery TV, Tony Robinson's Wild West (also known as Tony Robinson's Wild West in 3D), in which he attempted to uncover the reality of America's Wild West in the 19th and early 20th centuries. Featuring such key figures as Wyatt Earp, Geronimo and Buffalo Bill, it included artefacts and stereographic images. Also in 2015 he hosted a short-lived programme Time Crashers.

In 2016, Robinson hosted Hidden Britain By Drone, exploring parts of Britain only accessible by drone. A second series ran in 2018.

In March 2017, Robinson hosted his self-titled Channel Five programme Tony Robinson: Coast to Coast.

In 2018 Robinson continued his work with Channel Five presenting Britain's Great Cathedrals where he uncovers the history behind six of Britain's best cathedrals. He also presented a two-part series on Ancient Egypt called Egyptian Tomb Hunting.

In March 2019, Robinson premiered Around the World by Train with Tony Robinson on Channel 5 where he travelled to Asia, Australia and South America by rail. Series two of the programme premiered in March 2020.

In June 2019, Robinson presented a four-part series on Channel 5 titled The Thames: Britain's Great River with Tony Robinson where he walks the River Thames from source to the mouth.

In January 2020 Robinson premiered a new programme on Channel 5, Tony Robinson's History of Britain. A second series was broadcast in 2021.

In January 2021 Robinson returned to present the third series of his shows about the River Thames on Channel 5, now retitled The Secret Life of the Thames with Tony Robinson.

In 2021, Robinson narrated a series World War 2 From Above on UKTV.

In 2022, Robinson presented a new show for Channel 4 titled Tony Robinson's Museum of Us.

In 2022, Robinson was confirmed to return to the re-boot of Time Team in 2023.

In 2025, Robinson presented a documentary entitled Exposing Britain's Horror Victorian Workhouses released on the YouTube channel History Hit.

In September 2025, Robinson's debut novel The House of Wolf was published. The novel is set in the 9th century, and depicts the lives of Alfred the Great and his courtier and biographer, the Welsh monk Asser.

== Broadcasting career ==
In 2023, Robinson started broadcasting a weekly history podcast called "Tony Robinson's Cunningcast".

== Politics and charity work ==
Robinson identifies as a democratic socialist. From 1996 to 2000, Robinson was vice-president of the actors' union Equity, helping with a restructuring programme which turned a £500,000 deficit into a small surplus. He continues to work within Equity. In 2000, he was elected to the Labour Party's National Executive Committee, a position he held until 2004.

Robinson was active in the Make Poverty History campaign in 2005, and is the patron for British-based charity Street Child Africa.

In March 2011, Robinson participated in the "March for the Alternative" protests in Central London, which opposed the Cameron–Clegg coalition's spending cuts programme.

Robinson is honorary president of the Young Archaeologists' Club of the Council for British Archaeology. Robinson has shown his support for the Burma Campaign, an NGO that aims to highlight human rights violations in Myanmar under the State Peace and Development Council.

Robinson is a patron of older people's charity Alive, saying that the organisation is "at the forefront of promoting stimulating activities which help improve the quality of life of people in care". Alive works to transform the residential care sector, so that older people's mental, social and emotional well-being is prioritised alongside their physical care.

Robinson is a patron of the RSPCA Derby Abbey street animal rehoming centre in Derby, after adopting a dog from the centre.

Robinson was knighted in the 2013 Birthday Honours for public and political service.

On 23 June 2018, Robinson appeared at the People's Vote march in London to mark the second anniversary of the referendum to leave the European Union. People's Vote was a campaign group calling for a referendum on the final Brexit deal between British people and the European Union.

On 3 May 2019, Robinson announced that he had left the Labour Party after more than 40 years of membership, citing his dissatisfaction with the leadership of Jeremy Corbyn and the party's handling of Brexit and antisemitism allegations. He subsequently rejoined on 4 April 2020 after Corbyn's resignation and Keir Starmer's election as Labour leader.

On the day of the 2024 general election, Robinson campaigned for the Labour party, and posted to TikTok and Twitter, telling voters to "vote today, vote change, [and] vote Labour" in the "crucial" election.

== Personal life ==
Robinson was first married in 1969 to Barbara ("Bardy") Henshall, and divorced four years later. He was married from the late 1970s until 1992 to Mary Shepherd, with whom he had two children. He married Louise Hobbs in 2011.

In 2006, Robinson appeared in Tony Robinson: Me and My Mum, a documentary surrounding his decision to find a nursing home for his mother, and the difficulty he had doing so. The documentary showed his mother's death in the home. It also featured stories from other families in similar situations. It appeared as part of Channel 4's short series of programmes titled The Trouble with Old People.

In late 2009, Robinson was invited to be guest speaker at the Pride of Craegmoor Awards, where he gave a speech about his time with his mother and finding a care home. He then went on to give the prizes to Craegmoor's Shining Star and Leading Light. In January 2016, he described Alzheimer's as "one of the last great medical terrors" and announced he would be leaving money to the Alzheimer's Society in his will.

Robinson is a fan of EFL Championship club Bristol City F.C. He is also a fan of the rock band Genesis and provided sleeve notes for the reissue of the album The Lamb Lies Down on Broadway as part of the Genesis 1970–1975 box set.

== Honours and awards ==
- 1999: Honorary Master of Arts (M.A.) degree from the University of Bristol for his services to drama and archaeology.
- 2002: Honorary Master of Arts (M.A.) degree by the University of East London.
- 2005: Honorary degree of Doctor of the University (D.Univ.) from the Open University for his contribution to the educational or cultural well-being of society.
- 2005: Honorary Doctor of Laws (LL.D.) degree from the University of Exeter for his active involvement in politics.
- 2006: Honorary degree of Doctor of the University (D.Univ.) from Oxford Brookes University.
- 2008: James Joyce Award from the Literary and Historical Society of UCD.
- 2011: Honorary Doctor of Science (D.Sc.) degree by University of Chester.
- 2013: Knighthood from Queen Elizabeth II in her 2013 Birthday Honours List.
- 2019: Honorary Doctor of Letters (D.Litt.) degree from the University of Aberdeen.

== Selected filmography ==
- Sam on Boff's Island (1972) – Sam Samson
- Doctor in Charge (1973) – Reginald Grace
- Brannigan (1975) – Messenger
- The Boys and Mrs B (1977) – Mark
- Who Dares Wins (1983–1988) – Various characters
- Blackadder (1983–1989, 1999) – Baldrick
- The Young Ones (1984 Episode entitled "Bambi") – Dr. Not-The-Nine-O'clock-News
- Maid Marian and her Merry Men (1989–1994) – Sheriff of Nottingham & creator/writer
- Stay Tooned (1990–1996) – Presenter
- Blood and Honey (1991) – Presenter (Storyteller)
- Young Indiana Jones (1992) – Pierre Duclos
- The Neverending Story III (1994) – Engywook (male gnome)
- Time Team (1994–2013) – Presenter
- Wrestling with the Big One (1995) – Presenter (Storyteller)
- I'm Starting School (1995) – Timmy the Tortoise (voice)
- Holed (1996) – Hugh
- My Wonderful Life (1997–1999) – Alan
- Faeries (1999) – Broom (voice)
- Minder ("One Flew Over the Parents' Nest", Series 10, Episode 4) (1994) – Willie the Weed
- Fact or Fiction (2001–2004) – Presenter (Channel 4)
- Mrs Calicot's Cabbage War (2002) – Nick Reid
- Romans (documentary) (2003) – Presenter
- Britain's Real Monarch (2004) – Presenter
- The Worst Jobs in History (2004–07) – Presenter (Channel 4)
- The Real Da Vinci Code (2005) – Presenter (Channel 4)
- Tony Robinson's Titanic Adventure (2005) – Presenter (Channel 4)
- Spider-Plant Man (2005) – Robin
- Terry Pratchett's Hogfather (2006) – Vernon Crumley
- The Doomsday Code (2006) – Presenter
- Codex (2006–2007) – Presenter (Tuesday Morning Channel 4 and 4 HD)
- Unexplained (2008) – Presenter (Channel 4)
- Tony Robinson's Crime and Punishment (2008) – Presenter
- Catastrophe (2008) – Presenter
- Big Top (2009)
- Airline – Narrator
- Hotel Babylon – Arthur – Series 4, Episode 3 (2009)
- Jam TV (2009) – Himself, Episode 5
- Man on Earth (2009) – Presenter
- Birth of Britain (2010) – Presenter (Channel 4)
- Tony Robinson Explores Australia (2011) – Presenter (The History Channel Australia)
- Tony Robinson's God's and Monsters (2011–12) – Presenter (Channel 4)
- Tony Robinson's Time Walks (2012–2014) – Presenter (The History Channel Australia)
- The Life Of the Midland & South Western Junction Railway (2012) – Contributor (Independent Film)
- Walking Through History (2013–2014) – Presenter and Producer (Channel 4 and SBS)
- The Real Mill (2014) – Presenter (Channel 4)
- Tony Robinson's World War 1 (2014) – Presenter (Discovery)
- Tony Robinson's Tour of Duty (2015) – Presenter (The History Channel Australia)
- Tony Robinson's Wild West (2015) – Presenter (Discovery)
- Time Crashers (2015) – Host (Channel 4)
- Imaginative Storytelling Experiences featuring 'Tales from Fat Tulip's Garden (2016) – Contributor (Independent Film)
- Britain's Ancient Tracks with Tony Robinson (2016–2018) – Presenter (Channel 4 and SBS)
- Man Down (2016)
- Hidden Britain by Drone (2016–2018) – Presenter (Channel 4)
- Tony Robinson: Coast to Coast (2017) – Presenter (Channel 5 and SBS)
- Britain's Great Cathedrals with Tony Robinson (2018) – Presenter (Channel 5)
- Egyptian Tomb Hunting (2018) – Presenter (Channel 5)
- Around The World By Train With Tony Robinson (2019–20) – Presenter (Channel 5)
- The Thames: Britain's Great River with Tony Robinson (2019–2021) – Presenter (Channel 5) (also known under the alternative title The Secret Life of the Thames with Tony Robinson)
- Tony Robinson's History of Britain (2020–21) – Presenter (Channel 5)
- World War II from Above (2021) – Narrator (Yesterday)
- Britain's Forgotten Wars with Tony Robinson (2021) – Presenter (Channel 4)
- Thames at Night with Tony Robinson (2021) – Presenter (Channel 5)
- Tony Robinson's Museum of Us (2022) – Presenter (More4)
- The Madame Blanc Mysteries (2022) – Uncle Patrick (Channel 5)
- The Great Christmas Bake Off! (2022) – Contestant (Channel 4)
- Britain's Forgotten Wars with Tony Robinson (2021) – Presenter (Channel 5)
- Britain on Film with Tony Robinson (2022) – Presenter (Apple TV)
- Tony Robinson's Museum of Us (2022) – Presenter (Channel 4)
- Tony Robinson's Marvellous Machines (2023) – Presenter (Yesterday)
- The Masked Singer (2023) – Contestant (ITV1)

== Selected books written by Robinson ==
- Odysseus: The Greatest Hero of Them All (1986) co-written by Richard Curtis [children's book]
- Maid Marian and Her Merry Men (1989) [children's book]
- Odysseus Superhero (1996) co-written by Amanda Robinson and Richard Curtis [children's book]
- The Hutchinson Book of Kings and Queens of England (1999) illustrated by Posy Simmonds, Babette Cole and Nicholas Allan [children's book]
- Tony Robinson's History of Australia: From New Holland to Neighbours (2001) [travel book]
- Tony Robinson's Kings and Queens (2001) illustrated by Tony Robinson [children's book]
- Archaeology is Rubbish: A Beginner's Guide (2002) co-written by Michael Aston
- In Search of British Heroes (2003) [biography]
- The Worst Jobs in History (2005) illustrated by Mike Phillips [children's book]
- Bad Kids: The Worst-Behaved Children in History (2009) illustrated by Mike Phillips [children's book]
- Tony Robinson's Bad Kids: The Naughtiest Children in History (2011) illustrated by Del Thorpe [children's book]
- Tony Robinson's Weird World of Wonders! series, illustrated by Del Thorpe [children's book]. Topics include Romans (2012); Egyptians (2012); British (2012); Greeks (2012); World War II (2013); Inventions: A World Book Day Book (2013); Pets (2015); Joke Book (2017)
- Skulduggery (2014) illustrated by Jamie Smith [children's book]
- Tony Robinson: No Cunning Plan (2016) [autobiography]
- The House of Wolf (2025) [novel]
