= 2015 in British television =

This is a list of events that took place in 2015 related to British television.

== Events ==
=== January ===
Date	Event
1	BBC One airs the final ever episode of Miranda Hart's self-titled sitcom, Miranda. Overnight viewing figures suggest it was watched by an audience of 7.3 million.
2	Consolidated viewing figures reveal the comedy Mrs. Brown's Boys to have been the most watched programme on Christmas Day 2014, with an average audience of 9.69 million. However, viewing figures were lower than the previous year.
3	George Gallagher wins BBC One's Frank Sinatra: Our Way, a one-off show marking the 100th year of Sinatra's birth in which amateur performers provide their own interpretations of Ol' Blue Eyes classics.
5	The broadcasting regulator Ofcom clears EastEnders of breaching its regulations over a storyline involving the rape of Queen Victoria pub landlady Linda Carter (played by Kellie Bright).
5	Waterloo Road returns for its final run, but is moved from its Wednesday evening primetime slot on BBC One to a Monday evening slot on BBC Three, where it airs at 8:00. It is then repeated on BBC One at 10:35.
6	Comedian and actor Stephen Fry confirms he is to marry his partner, Elliott Spender. The couple are married two weeks later at a register office in Norfolk.
7	The Top Gear Patagonia Special, which included the series' controversial trip to Argentina, was the most watched programme on BBC iPlayer over the festive period.
7	It is confirmed that Gemma Atkinson will join Emmerdale as new character Carly Hope.
8	Prime Minister David Cameron says he will not take part in planned debates ahead of this year's general election unless the Green Party is included.
8	Ofcom opens a consultation on whether any of the smaller political parties should be considered as major parties ahead of the election, a status that entitles them to be allocated at least two Party Election Broadcasts. The regulator says it is minded to consider the UK Independence Party as a major party, but not the Green Party. The process will finish in February, after which Ofcom will publish its findings.
9	It is reported that the BBC has submitted its news coverage of the police raid on a property belonging to Cliff Richard in July 2014 for best news story at the 2015 Royal Television Society journalism awards.
10	Former Baywatch actor Jeremy Jackson is removed from the fifteenth series of Celebrity Big Brother after he got drunk and pulled open fellow contestant Chloe Goodman's dressing gown the previous day. Jackson is subsequently given a police caution for common assault over the incident.
10	Comedian Dara Ó Briain confirms he is stepping down as presenter of The Apprentice: You're Fired!. Jack Dee is confirmed as his replacement in September.
10	Two weeks after receiving its British television premiere, Skyfall airs again on ITV as part of its Saturday night schedule.
12	BBC News reporter Tim Willcox issues an apology after making what he describes as a "poorly phrased" comment while talking to the daughter of a Holocaust survivor during a broadcast from the previous day's demonstrations in Paris to remember the 17 victims of the 2015 Île-de-France attacks. After the woman, who was marching with the crowd, had expressed her concern that the persecution of Jews was "back to the days of the 1930s in Europe", Willcox had replied "Many critics though of Israel's policy would suggest that the Palestinians suffer hugely at Jewish hands as well". Willcox says the question was "entirely unintentional".
12	Former Coronation Street actor Ken Morley is removed from the fifteenth series of Celebrity Big Brother for using "unacceptable and offensive language" after Ofcom received 233 complaints about his behaviour. The decision was taken to remove him from the house after he called fellow contestant Alexander O'Neal a "negro".
12	ITV confirms that it is to axe its 1940s crime drama Foyle's War, the second time the series has been cancelled.
14	Ed Miliband, Nick Clegg and Nigel Farage, the three respective leaders of Labour, the Liberal Democrats and the UK Independence Party, have written to prime minister and Conservative Party leader David Cameron to say that they will still take part in the planned pre-election televised debates even if he is not present. They will call for the various broadcasters holding the debates to include an empty podium, enabling Cameron to be included if he changes his mind. The issue is also the subject of a heated exchange between Miliband and Cameron at the day's session of Prime Minister's Questions.
14	Comedian Al Murray confirms his intention to stand for the Thanet South constituency at the general election, where one of his fellow candidates will be UK Independence Party leader Nigel Farage. Murray will stand as his character The Pub Landlord for the Free United Kingdom Party, a version of Farage's party.
14	Ballet dancer and Strictly judge Darcey Bussell is announced as co-presenter and dance expert for the Grand Final of the inaugural BBC Young Dancer competition, which will be aired live from Sadler's Wells Theatre on BBC Two in May.
15	The CBBC programme Blue Peter launches a competition to select three of its viewers to become "CBBC Intelligence Officers" who will be given a tour of Thames House, the headquarters of MI5. The visit will be filmed, marking the first time television cameras will have been allowed inside the building.
16	A report from the House of Lords Communication Committee suggests there are "simply not enough" women in broadcasting and that more should be done to increase their number.
16	Andy Wilman, the executive producer of Top Gear tells Broadcast magazine that the BBC has lost confidence in the programme following an "annus horribilis".
16	BBC Three announces the cancellation of its supernatural drama, In the Flesh after two series.
18	Soul singer Alexander O'Neal becomes the third Celebrity Big Brother contestant to leave the series and was evicted via a public vote after walking out. He had previously been reprimanded for using homophobic language towards another housemate.
18	Comedian Richard Blackwood will join the cast of EastEnders as a villain, it is announced, making his debut in February's 30th anniversary live episode.
19	Shadow Business Secretary Chuka Umunna walks out of an interview with Sky News presenter Dermot Murnaghan after criticising him for asking about a letter that Eric Pickles, the Secretary of State for Communities and Local Government had sent to British mosques urging them to make greater efforts to combat Islamic extremism. Umunna had not read the letter at that stage.
19	Katie Redford, who was scheduled to play 14-year-old Bethany Platt in Coronation Street, is dropped from the series after claiming to be younger than her actual age. An ITV press release had given her age as 19, but users of the Digital Spy website discovered evidence suggesting she is 25. The role is subsequently recast, and Lucy Fallon is announced as the actress who will play Bethany.
19	Anne Kirkbride, who played Coronation Street's Deirdre Barlow for 42 years, dies in a Manchester hospital following a short illness. Production of the series is suspended the following day as a mark of respect to her.
19	BBC One airs the 5000th episode of EastEnders.
20	In an attempt to save BBC Three from closure, the Avalon Group and Hat Trick Productions approach the BBC Trust with an offer to buy the channel.
21	William Roache of Coronation Street and Adam Woodyatt of EastEnders lead tributes to Anne Kirkbride at the 20th National Television Awards.
21	The television adaptation of Hilary Mantel's factual-based novels Wolf Hall and Bring Up the Bodies debuts on BBC Two to much critical acclaim, but viewers quickly take to social media to complain about the poor lighting in the series.
22	Figures reveal that an episode from the third series of Sherlock from January 2014 was the most watched programme on BBC iPlayer during 2014, with an audience of 4.2 million.
22	Ray Mears loses a £10,000 speaking gig at the forthcoming Caravan, Camping and Motorhome Show after he described caravans as "hideous" and "ghastly" on a recent edition of Room 101.
23	New proposals are published by the UK's major broadcasters to include the leaders of more political parties in the forthcoming televised debates. The BBC and ITV will now host seven-way debates between the leaders of the Conservatives, Labour, the Liberal Democrats, UK Independence Party, the Green Party, the Scottish National Party and Plaid Cymru. Channel 4 and Sky will host head-to-head debates between David Cameron and Ed Miliband.
23	Coronation Street actress Barbara Knox (who plays Rita Sullivan in the series) is banned from driving for twelve months after pleading guilty to a drink driving charge.
23	The BBC announces sixteen new shows that will be exclusive to iPlayer. They include Funny Valentine, a comedy starring Bill Bailey, and rapper Tinie Tempah giving a tour of the Victoria and Albert Museum.
23	Interior designer Kelly Hoppen announces she is leaving Dragons' Den after two years.
26	The BBC announces that Atlantis will not be renewed for a third series. The second part of series two is scheduled to be screened in the spring.
27	In a Radio Times interview BBC Director-General Tony Hall suggests that the rise of on demand television may render the current 9.00 pm watershed ineffective in restricting the availability of unsuitable material to underage viewers.
28	A BBC report recommends improvements to local and international news coverage, as well as digital content, if the broadcaster is to maintain its relevance in the modern climate.
29	BBC Sport signs a new three-year deal with the Premier League to air football highlights up to the end of the 2018–19 season. The agreement will see the launch of a new midweek football programme, as well as the continuation of Match of the Day and Match of the Day 2 at weekends.
29	An Ofcom report on subtitling highlights the difficulties caused by voice recognition software that can fail to recognise speech patterns during live subtitling of programmes such as the news, sometimes rendering the translated text almost impossible to decipher. Examples of such goof ups include words such as "sauces" instead of "sources", and an instance when Manchester United footballer Adnan Januzaj's name was translated as Janet Jazz Jazz Jam.
29	BBC and ITV both decline a request from Northern Ireland's Democratic Unionist Party to be included in the forthcoming leadership debates because both broadcasters feel it would be impartial for only one of the Northern Ireland parties to participate.

=== February ===
Date	Event
2	Channel 4 announces a reduction in the number of planned episodes of its forthcoming series Immigration Street after documentary makers encountered protests while filming the series in Southampton.
2	EastEnders producers announce that Denise van Outen will have a guest role in the soap later in the year.
2	Global Radio, the owners of pop music channel Heart TV, are reprimanded by Ofcom after the channel played 72 seconds more than the permitted amount of advertising during one particular hour in October 2014. Global says the incident occurred when a commercial break was pushed to the end of an hour, creating too much advertising time for the following hour.
3	Sky Sports has signed a £15 million deal with the Open Championship to screen the event from 2017, ending 61 years of free-to-air coverage by the BBC.
3	Dominic Treadwell-Collins, the Executive Producer of EastEnders, says he will not introduce minority characters into the series just to fulfil diversity quotas.
3	Reinventing the Royals, a BBC Two documentary pulled from the 4 January schedule because of concerns over the broadcasting rights of archive footage, is rescheduled for 19 February.
3	BBC Trust chair Rona Fairhead says there is public support for the establishment of an independent body to oversee setting the level of the television license fee.
3	The BBC announces plans to host the Eurovision Song Contest's 60-year celebration event at the Eventim Apollo in Hammersmith, London on 31 March 2015.
4	Sky reports an increase of more than 200,000 customers in the UK and Ireland in the second half of 2014, its highest growth for nine years.
4	Ed Balls, the Shadow Chancellor of the Exchequer, laughs off an appearance on the previous evening's edition of Newsnight in which he could not remember the surname of a senior Labour Party donor, claiming "it's an age thing".
5	Government plans to decriminalise non-payment of the television license are defeated in the House of Lords, which votes to maintain the status quo until at least 2017.
5	The Office is named the "Best programme of the last 20 years" at this year's Broadcast Awards, with BBC One being honoured "Channel of the year" and Match of the Day receiving a special recognition award.
5	Respect Party MP George Galloway makes a controversial appearance on Question Time during which he is asked a question about the rise in antisemitism in the UK, and whether he bears some responsibility for its increase. Galloway's appearance on the show had been criticised ahead of its broadcast by several individuals and groups, including Times of Israel columnist Alex Klineberg because of Galloway's outspoken views on Israel. Galloway later claims to have been set up, and that chair David Dimbleby apologised to him privately over the tone of the question.
6	Katie Price wins the fifteenth series of Celebrity Big Brother.
9	Joey Essex wins the second series of The Jump.
10	It is reported that the Premier League sold the football broadcast rights from 2016 to 2019 for £5.136 billion, 71% above the 2012 round. Seven TV packages were sold, with Sky paying £4.2 billion for five of the packages, and BT £960 million for the remaining two.
10	Australia is to be allowed to compete at the 2015 Eurovision Song Contest to celebrate the contest's 60th year. The Australian entry will be fast tracked to the final, and allowed to compete again in 2016 should it win, but in the event of an Australian win the contest would still be held in Europe.
11	Linda Henry (who plays Shirley Carter in EastEnders) is cleared of racially aggravated behaviour following a hearing at Bexley Magistrates.
12	Channel 4 News presenter Cathy Newman apologises after describing on Twitter how she was "ushered" out of a south London mosque. She had, in fact, been at the wrong venue.
13	Former TV weatherman Fred Talbot is convicted of indecently assaulting two boys while he worked at a school in Greater Manchester, and remanded in custody to await sentence. He is cleared of a further eight charges.
14	Peter Sarsfield wins the first revival series of Harry Hill's Stars in Their Eyes as Frankie Valli.
16	The BBC unveils a series of new arts programmes, which will air in primetime slots. They include a new BBC Two series titled Artsnight and a one off debate, Artists Question Time, presented by Kirsty Wark, which will air on BBC Four.
16	Channel 4 News are censured by Ofcom for misleading viewers in a report about possible police corruption from March 2014, after it is revealed that interviewees who were presented as members of the public were in fact pre-selected and had ties with the broadcaster.
16	Channel 4 airs the docudrama UKIP: The First 100 Days, a programme imagining a 2015 election victory for the UK Independence Party, which mixes archive footage with scenes involving actors, and depicts scenes of civil unrest following the fictitious election win. By the following day it has collectively attracted more than 1,000 complaints to Ofcom and Channel 4.
16	Television presenters Ant and Dec are interviewed about politics by The Times and offer their opinion on the prospect of Ed Miliband becoming prime minister.
17	BBC One airs the first of four EastEnders episodes to feature live inserts throughout its 30th anniversary week. The editions also feature actor Himesh Patel tweeting in character as Tamwar Masood during the show's live segment, a first for British television. Firefighters are called to a blaze at the set a few hours after the first of four episodes are aired, but damage is minimal and will not interrupt the show's filming schedule. The cause of the fire is later revealed to have been a rehearsal for a fireworks display to celebrate the anniversary.
17	Teletubbies creator Anne Wood expresses her dismay that the series is to be remade in a Radio Times interview.
17	Campaigners against BBC plans to close BBC Three and move it online deliver a petition to the BBC Trust.
18	A groundbreaking party election broadcast in which Scottish Conservative Party leader Ruth Davidson is seen with her partner Jen Wilson is aired on television in Scotland.
19	EastEnders concludes the Who Killed Lucy Beale? storyline by revealing her younger brother Bobby Beale as her killer live in a special flashback episode to celebrate the show's 30th anniversary.
19	Gillian Taylforth makes a surprise and unannounced return to EastEnders as Kathy Beale, a role which she played from the show's inception in 1985 to 2000, despite the character having been said to have died in a car crash in South Africa in 2006.
20	BBC One airs a completely live episode of EastEnders to celebrate the show's 30th anniversary. A repeat of the first ever episode is also aired via the BBC Red Button.
21	Ant & Dec's Saturday Night Takeaway returns for its twelfth series.
23	Ofcom launches an investigation into Channel 4's docudrama UKIP: The First 100 Days amid concerns it may have breached rules regarding "offensive material, misleadingness and due impartiality" after 5,000 viewers complained about the programme.
23	Television presenter Phillip Schofield criticises the BBC for selling its Television Centre studios, an action he describes as criminal.
24	An independent report into events surrounding the Summer 2014 police raid on a property belonging to Cliff Richard, which was compiled by Andy Trotter, the former chief constable of British Transport Police, concludes that South Yorkshire Police should not have released "highly confidential" details of the raid to the BBC.
24	BBC One announces that the crime series New Tricks will end after twelve series.
24	ITV confirms Broadchurch will return for a third series.
24	Immigration Street, the follow-up programme to the controversial 2014 documentary series Benefits Street, airs on Channel 4. Originally conceived as a series, after protests from local residents in Southampton where it was filmed, the planned series was reduced to a single episode.
25	Madonna falls off a stage at the BRIT Awards after a cloak she was wearing was tied too tightly.
26	A report by the House of Commons Culture, Media and Sport Committee suggests that the TV licence has no long-term future and will be replaced by a new system within fifteen years.
26	A sexual assault storyline in ITV soap Emmerdale involving the characters Alicia Gallagher (Natalie Anderson) and Lachlan White (Thomas Atkinson) which aired before the 9:00 pm watershed attracts 45 complaints to the regulator Ofcom.
28	The Midlands-based soap Crossroads returns to British television screens with repeats airing on the West Midlands channel Big Centre TV, which launches at 6:00 pm. However, as the channel goes on air, plans to repeat the series are at the centre of a disagreement over the amount of royalties paid to former Crossroads actors, with one of the programme's stars, Paul Henry (who played Benny Hawkins) threatening to take legal action over the issue.
28	The BBC confirms that its Political Editor Nick Robinson will take time off while he undergoes surgery to remove a tumour from his lung, but plans to be back at work in time to cover the general election.
28	An inquiry in Rwanda recommends the country's government should initiate legal proceedings against the BBC over its 2014 This World documentary, Rwanda's Untold Story, which questioned official accounts of the 1994 Rwandan genocide.

=== March ===
Date	Event
1	EastEnders executive producer Dominic Treadwell-Collins tells London's Student Pride of his plans to introduce the soap's first transgender character, and that he would like a transgender actor to play the role.
2	In a speech at London's New Broadcasting House, BBC Director-General Tony Hall warns that funding cuts to the broadcaster would leave it "reduced in impact and reach" and consequently leave Britain "diminished".
2	Ofcom has launched an investigation into an item that appeared on the 3 February edition of This Morning in which the presenters discussed bondage with a sex expert.
3	Rolf Harris is stripped of his CBE following his conviction on several accounts of indecent assault last year.
3	Several BBC local radio stations are launched on Freeview, with ten of the 40 local stations in England now broadcasting on the platform. They can be found on channels 719 to 722.
4	An independent review concludes that the BBC has spent 29% less on stars earning over £100,000 over the last five years.
4	ITV reports a rise in profits, which increased 39% to £605 million in 2014.
4	BBC Two airs the Storyville documentary India's Daughter which includes an interview with the man convicted over the 2012 Delhi gang rape.
5	David Cameron is accused of "cowering" from the public as he confirms that he will only take part in one televised debate ahead of the general election, rejecting proposals for a head-to-head with Labour leader Ed Miliband.
5	June Whitfield and Jan Harvey will make cameo appearances in EastEnders later in the year, it is confirmed.
6	The UK's major broadcasters have said they will press ahead with plans for three television debates, even though David Cameron has said he will participate in only one of them.
7	Deputy Prime Minister and Liberal Democrat leader Nick Clegg says he will take David Cameron's place in the forthcoming television debates if Cameron is unwilling to participate.
7	BBC One's Match of the Day Live shows Aston Villa's FA Cup quarter final match against West Bromwich Albion. The pitch is invaded by Villa fans celebrating the team's victory towards the end of the game, prompting a Football Association investigation into the incident. The game, aired at 5:15 pm, is watched by 3.90 million viewers (a 23.5% audience share). In May, the Football Association fines Aston Villa £200,000 over the incident after the club admits to "spectacular misconduct".
7	Electro Velvet are chosen to represent the United Kingdom at the Eurovision Song Contest 2015 with the song "Still in Love with You".
8	Ed Miliband says that a future Labour government would introduce legislation to make televised debates a permanent feature of future general election campaigns, meaning politicians could not attempt to prevent them from taking place through self-interest.
9	David Cameron says he will not change his mind about appearing in only one of the forthcoming general election debates.
9	BBC One airs the final episode of Waterloo Road. Prior to its broadcast, the Daily Record publishes an interview with Eileen Gallagher, one of the series' co-creators, who describes its axing as "a lost opportunity" for Scottish television. She argues that Scotland should have a continuing drama in the same vein as Holby City or EastEnders that would attract and nurture Scottish talent.
10	The BBC confirms that it has suspended Jeremy Clarkson following an altercation with a producer. The broadcaster also announces that the upcoming episode of Top Gear, due to air on Sunday 15 March, will not be shown. By the following day, a Change.org petition started by the right-wing blogger Paul Staines (Guido Fawkes) calling on the BBC to reinstate Clarkson has been signed by over 350,000 people.
10	Speaking to the Radio Times, comedian Jason Manford praises the BBC's decision to ban all-male panels on its programmes, but says they should not have publicised the move.
10	Figures released by the National Audit Office indicate that the BBC's cost-cutting programme exceeded expectations in 2013–14 by making savings of £374 million, which included one-off savings such as reducing the amount of Formula One coverage.
11	Television executive and Conservative peer Michael Grade warns that broadcasters are breaching impartiality rules if they stage televised debates without David Cameron being present. His comments come as the organisers of an online debate offer to move forward its planned date to the end of March to accommodate the prime minister, who has said he would participate in one debate only.
12	Footage emerges of an upcoming Channel 4 documentary in which UKIP leader Nigel Farage says he would scrap much of the legislation that prevents race discrimination. Farage was speaking to broadcaster Trevor Phillips in the documentary titled Things We Won't Say About Race That Are True. Downing Street describes the comments as "deeply concerning".
12	ITV announces it has acquired the Dutch television production company Talpa Media for £355 million.
12	The BBC is to give away a million mini computers to all pupils starting secondary school in September as part of the Make it Digital scheme, an initiative to make the UK more digital.
13	Highlights of this year's Red Nose Day telethon include Daniel Craig appearing in a sketch as James Bond, a special edition of Little Britain featuring Stephen Hawking and a new sketch of Mr. Bean starring Rowan Atkinson. The telethon raises £78 million on the night, bringing the total amount of money raised by Comic Relief to £1 billion since its launch in 1985. A few days later, on 18 March, it is announced that Red Nose Day will make its US television debut later in the year with a three-hour show on NBC.
13	Coronation Street executive producer Kieran Roberts tells the Digital Spy website that the soap plans an on-screen farewell to the character Deirdre Barlow, played by Anne Kirkbride, later in the year, but are consulting with the actress's family first. Kirkbride's name will also remain on her dressing room door as a permanent tribute to her.
13	Following his guilty verdict on 13 February, former TV weatherman Fred Talbot is sentenced to five years in prison.
16	Ofcom adds the UK Independence Party to its list of major political parties, entitling them to at least two Party Election Broadcasts during the run-up to the election.
16	Ofcom reprimands local channel Made in Leeds after its launch programme on 6 November 2014 included an expletive, which aired before the watershed. The material was also repeated at 8:00 am the following morning.
17	The Traveller Movement says it will complain to Ofcom after the BBC Trust committee ruled that the use of the word "pikey" in an episode of Top Gear that aired in February 2014 was not offensive.
17	BBC Two confirms that entrepreneurs Nick Jenkins, Sarah Willingham and Touker Suleyman will join Dragons' Den for series 13.
17	The BBC confirms it has bought the rights to broadcast BT Sport's The Clare Balding Show, which will air on BBC Two.
17	David Cameron confirms he has accepted an offer from the major broadcasters to participate in a seven-way televised debate at the beginning of April. However, the full details of this are yet to be confirmed.
17	Cast members of Australian soap Neighbours hold a 30th anniversary celebration for the series in London. Channel Five airs the Neighbours 30th anniversary special the following day.
18	The BBC announces it has commissioned Abused: The Untold Story, a documentary investigating the impact of child abuse on its victims, which will include an examination of the Jimmy Savile scandal.
20	A man dressed as The Stig from Top Gear hands in a million-strong petition to Downing Street calling on the BBC to reinstate Jeremy Clarkson, as footage emerges of the presenter speaking at a fundraising dinner in which he says that he expects to be fired by the broadcaster. Clarkson also used the event to launch a four-letter tirade against the Corporation, but later claims he was joking.
21	The UK's major broadcasters say they have agreed to hold a seven-party televised leaders debate on 2 April, which will be staged by ITV and chaired by Julie Etchingham. However, there will be no head-to-head between David Cameron and Ed Miliband, with them instead taking part in separate question and answer sessions aired jointly by Sky News and Channel 4 on 26 March. A debate featuring five opposition leaders will air on BBC One on 16 April.
22	The BBC announces that four Top Gear Live shows due to be held in Norway on 27 and 28 March will be postponed until later in the year.
23	It is announced that comedian Frankie Boyle will present his own unique analysis of the general election for Frankie Boyle's Autopsy, a programme that will be available on the BBC iPlayer from 17 May. The show will be similar to one he did for the 2014 Scottish independence referendum.
25	BBC Director-General Tony Hall confirms that Jeremy Clarkson's contract with the Corporation will not be renewed following his "unprovoked physical attack" on a Top Gear producer. Two days later it is reported that Oisin Tymon, the producer on the receiving end of Clarkson's wrath, has decided to press criminal charges against him.
26	ITV confirms that the upcoming sixth series of Downton Abbey will be the last.
26	The first of the leaders debates sees Jeremy Paxman and Kay Burley presenting a joint Channel 4 and Sky News question and answer session with Prime Minister David Cameron and Leader of the Opposition Ed Miliband appearing separately.
26	The acclaimed US crime series Breaking Bad will have its first full run on UK terrestrial television with the upcoming channel Spike set to air it when it launches later in the year.
26	10th anniversary of the 2005 relaunch of Doctor Who.
26	BBC Director-General Tony Hall signs a deal with Northern Ireland Screen which will see an increase in network spending in Northern Ireland. The agreement will also enable an extra £200,000 a year to be invested in drama development, and a £2 million annual investment in children's content.
27	After eight years of presenting The X Factor, Dermot O'Leary announces he is leaving the series.
28	Debut on Channel 4 of Coalition, a film telling the story of how the Conservative–Liberal Democrat coalition government was formed in May 2010.
29	Police are investigating alleged death threats against BBC Director-General Tony Hall over the decision to sack Jeremy Clarkson from his Top Gear presenting role.
29	Labour's campaign co-ordinator Lucy Powell accuses Andrew Neil of interrupting her and refusing to let her answer questions when the two clash over Labour policy on BBC One's The Sunday Politics.
31	Norwich based channel Mustard TV apologises after presenter Helen McDermott referred to her colleague Darren Eadie as a cunt on air.
31	BBC Worldwide confirms that Jeremy Clarkson will still fulfil a number of live Top Gear shows beginning in Belfast on 22 May "so as not to disappoint fans".

=== April ===
Date	Event
2	Julie Etchingham chairs a seven-party leaders debate for ITV ahead of the election, featuring the leaders of the Conservatives, Labour, the Liberal Democrats, UKIP, the Greens, the Scottish National Party and Plaid Cymru. Overnight figures suggest it was watched by seven million viewers, a 31% audience share.
3	BBC One airs Eurovision's Greatest Hits, a concert celebrating 60 years of the Eurovision Song Contest, which is watched by an average audience of 1.89 million (9.5%).
3	Vogue Williams wins the first series of ITV's reality show, Bear Grylls: Mission Survive.
4	Stevie McCrorie wins the fourth series of The Voice UK, and his debut single is released at midnight.
7	Nicola Sturgeon, Jim Murphy, Ruth Davidson and Willie Rennie — the leaders of Scotland's four main political parties — take part in an STV televised debate in Edinburgh ahead of the 2015 UK general election.
8	BBC Scotland airs the second leaders' debate in 24 hours, this time from Aberdeen. The programme features Nicola Sturgeon of the Scottish National Party, Jim Murphy for the Scottish Labour Party, Ruth Davidson for the Scottish Conservative Party, Willie Rennie for the Scottish Liberal Democrats, Patrick Harvie of the Scottish Greens and David Coburn for the UK Independence Party.
9	An Ofcom report indicates that the 72 UK channels required to provide subtitling, audio description and signing "met or exceeded" their targets in 2014.
11	Britain's Got Talent returns for its ninth series.
13	The season five premiere of Game of Thrones airs on Sky Atlantic, giving the channel its highest viewing figures to date with an audience of 1.57 million, a 6.7% share of overall viewership.
13	Gonville and Caius College, Cambridge wins the 2014–15 series of University Challenge, beating Magdalen College, Oxford 255–105.
14	Sue Perkins, who presents The Great British Bake Off, announces she is taking a break from Twitter after receiving death threats following reports she was in the running to succeed Jeremy Clarkson as host of Top Gear.
16	David Dimbleby chairs an election debate featuring five opposition leaders on BBC One, featuring Ed Miliband (Labour), Nigel Farage (UKIP), Natalie Bennett (Green), Nicola Sturgeon (SNP) and Leanne Wood (Plaid Cymru). Farage accuses the BBC of fielding a "left wing audience", prompting Dimbleby to state that the audience was selected by an independent polling company. The debate is watched by 4.3 million viewers, a 20.5% audience share.
16	Evan Davis chairs a Northern Ireland leaders debate with representatives from five Northern Ireland parties. They are Nigel Dodds (Democratic Unionist Party), Máirtín Ó Muilleoir (Sinn Féin), Mike Nesbitt (Ulster Unionist Party), Mark Durkan (Social Democratic and Labour Party), and David Ford (Alliance Party).
16	Olly Murs and Caroline Flack are confirmed as presenters for the next series of The X Factor following the departure of Dermot O'Leary.
17	Paula Tilbrook, who has played Betty Eagleton in Emmerdale for 21 years, announces her retirement.
20	Ofcom clears This Morning over an item discussing bondage equipment and sex toys that appeared on the show's 3 February edition.
20	Ofcom have launched an investigation into the BBC One daytime soap Doctors for use of offensive language after an edition aired on 27 February in which a character used the word "pussy" as an insult.
21	It is announced that Johnny Vegas, Frank Skinner and Kim Cattrall will star in four silent comedies commissioned by Sky Arts.
22	Following an appearance on ITV's This Morning, Prime Minister David Cameron jokingly compares former Scottish First Minister Alex Salmond to a pickpocket. As host Phillip Schofield introduces the next item, a demonstration by a professional pickpocket, with the words, "Up next, a man who can pinch your wallet, your watch and even your tie without you noticing" Cameron is then heard to say, "Is that Alex Salmond?"
22	Channel 4 announces that its entertainment channel E4 will close for the day on election day, 7 May, in order to encourage more young people to vote.
22	Actor Robert Downey Jr. walks out of a Channel 4 News interview after presenter Krishnan Guru-Murthy asked him about his past troubles with drugs.
22	The first television debate featuring Welsh political leaders is aired by ITV Wales. The participants are Stephen Crabb (Conservative), Owen Smith (Labour), Kirsty Williams (Liberal Democrats), Leanne Wood (Plaid Cymru), Nathan Gill (UKIP) and Pippa Bartolotti (Greens).
23	Plans to move BBC Three online are postponed until 2016 while the BBC waits for approval from the BBC Trust.
24	Simon Wood wins the 2015 series of MasterChef.
24	The Dora the Explorer episode "Dora's Night Light Adventure", premieres on Nick Jr. UK.
26	Labour leader Ed Miliband and Conservative Mayor of London Boris Johnson take part in a lively debate on BBC One's The Andrew Marr Show.
26	Downton Abbey creator Julian Fellowes is to adapt Anthony Trollope's novel Doctor Thorne into a three-part series for ITV, with filming set to begin later in the year.
26	BBC One airs the series finale of Poldark, which overnight figures later indicate is watched by 5.9 million viewers.
27	Claude Littner is unveiled as Nick Hewer's replacement in the boardroom for series eleven of The Apprentice.
28	Marc Mallett chairs an election debate featuring representatives from the Democratic Unionist Party, Sinn Féin, Ulster Unionist Party, Social Democratic and Labour Party and the Alliance Party on UTV in Northern Ireland. The debate is also aired nationally on ITV, and viewed by an audience of 27,000.
30	BBC One airs a Question Time special featuring the three main party leaders (David Cameron, Ed Miliband and Nick Clegg), but appearing separately. The 90-minute programme is watched by an average audience of 4.3 million (21.1% share of total viewership), peaking at 4.9 million. Later that evening, three separate 30-minute debates featuring Nigel Farage, Nicola Sturgeon and Leanne Wood are aired on BBC One in England, Scotland and Wales respectively.

=== May ===
Date	Event
1	After agreeing a deal with Endemol, Irish commercial channel TV3 announce they will broadcast Big Brother, the sixteenth series of which begins airing from 12 May. The programme had been absent from Irish TV screens since 2011 when it moved to Channel 5, which is not licensed to broadcast in the Irish Republic.
3	Nicola Sturgeon, Jim Murphy, Ruth Davidson and Willie Rennie take part in the final Scottish leaders debate, held by the BBC in Edinburgh.
3	BBC One airs The C-Word, a dramatisation of Lisa Lynch's book about her battle with breast cancer. The film is watched by a peak audience of 4.2 million.
5	It is reported that Ofcom is investigating Top Gear for its use of the word "pikey" in an episode broadcast in February 2014, the matter having previously been dismissed by the BBC Trust. On the same day, Ofcom clears ITV of breaching its regulations after receiving 151 complaints about the tone of language used by US rapper Kanye West during the 2015 BRIT Awards because ITV had muted the most offensive words used.
5	BBC One Northern Ireland airs a leaders debate featuring leaders from Northern Ireland's main political parties.
7	More4 airs a live performance of James Graham's play, The Vote, which is set in a London polling station, and staged at the Donmar Warehouse.
7	BBC Sport NI announce their coverage of the 2015 North West 200 motorcycle race to be held later this month, which will air on radio and television across Northern Ireland, as well as online.
7–8	The BBC, ITV, Channel 4 and Sky News provide coverage of the results of the 2015 general election, which sees the Conservatives secure a slim majority. Overnight viewing figures indicate the BBC's coverage, which saw David Dimbleby presenting his last election programme, to have been watched by 6.35 million. Channel 4's Alternative Election Night was seen by 1.9 million, while ITV's coverage, presented by Tom Bradby and Julie Etchingham, was watched by 1.45 million viewers. An audience of 356,000 tuned into Sky News in the first hour to watch coverage presented by Adam Boulton. The BBC's election coverage sees Dimbleby apparently losing his patience when, at 4:01 am, he is heard to utter "for God's sake" as the programme returns to the studio following a short break.
8	An election special of BBC One's Question Time airs, featuring a panel discussing the fallout from the election. Panellists are Paddy Ashdown, Alastair Campbell, Francis Maude, Julia Hartley-Brewer and John Swinney. Question Time is followed by an election special of Have I Got News for You presented by Jo Brand, with Romesh Ranganathan and Jon Snow joining regular panellists Paul Merton and Ian Hislop. Filming took place on the morning of 8 May, against the backdrop of unfolding events, something that requires a runner to twice dash on stage to inform the panel of breaking news events—the resignations of Nick Clegg and Ed Miliband as the respective leaders of the Liberal Democrats and Labour Party. The Question Time Election Special is seen by 3.16 million (15.4%), while Have I Got Election News for You is the most watched programme of the evening, with an average audience of 4.49 million (21.9%).
9	Contemporary dancer Connor Scott wins the inaugural BBC Young Dancer competition, broadcast live on BBC Two.
10	Broadcaster Clive James is honoured at the 2015 British Academy Television Awards.
11	John Whittingdale is appointed as Secretary of State for Culture, Media and Sport in a post-general election Cabinet reshuffle, replacing Sajid Javid.
11	The BBC unveils its coverage of the 2015 FIFA Women's World Cup, which begins in Canada on 6 June, and will be available through television, radio, and online through the BBC Sport website. It will be the first time the BBC has provided full coverage of the Women's World Cup.
11	Responding to a suggestion from Chancellor of the Exchequer George Osborne that British television should be more like television in the United States, the BBC head of drama, Ben Stephenson, warns that the Corporation's drama department is "at tipping point" because of cuts that have been made at the BBC, and calls for the licence fee to be increased.
12	Cleveland Police are to view footage from the second series of Channel 4's Benefits Street after the programme, which began its second run the previous evening, allegedly showed scenes of criminal activity and drug misuse.
12	Prince Charles's press secretary, Kristina Kyriacou, intervenes when Channel 4 News reporter Michael Crick tries to question the Prince ahead of the release of the Black spider letters he sent to ministers of the Blair government a decade ago. Crick approaches the Prince as he steps from a car on a visit to a Marks & Spencer store, but is blocked by Kyriacou, who then seizes his microphone, tearing off the foam windshield, which she throws to the ground. She then gives the reporter a smile as she disappears into the shop.
12	Shayne Ward, winner of the second series of The X Factor, is to join Coronation Street as the character Aidan Connor after signing a one-year contract.
13	The BBC confirms that its international subscription-based version of the iPlayer will close on 26 June.
14	BBC Assistant Political Editor Norman Smith accidentally uses the word "cunt" during a live broadcast while reporting on an article in The Times in which UKIP campaign chief Patrick O'Flynn expressed his concern that Nigel Farage is turning the party into a "personality cult".
14	Members of BECTU stage a 24-hour strike at ITV, causing some disruption to programming. Filming on Coronation Street and Emmerdale is delayed, while the day's edition of Loose Women is pre-recorded. Filming of Have I Got News for You, which is recorded at ITV's London studios, is also delayed. ITV Chief Executive Adam Crozier uses the occasion to launch an attack on the BBC, which he feels should come under the full control of Ofcom. In July, members of BECTU, the NUJ and Unite vote to accept an improved pay offer of 2.2%.
15	ITV are announced as the broadcaster that will provide coverage of the official celebrations to mark Queen Elizabeth II's 90th birthday in 2016.
16	Anne Kirkbride is posthumously honoured at the British Soap Awards with a special award for outstanding achievement, which is presented at the ceremony to her husband by former colleague William Roache.
16	BBC One airs the feature length finale of Atlantis, which is watched by an average audience of 2.5 million (14% of overall viewer share).
17	BBC Two begins airing The Detectives, a three-part documentary series following investigators at Greater Manchester Police's sex crimes unit. The series, aired over three consecutive nights, focuses on the investigation into historical sex crimes committed by disc jockey Ray Teret, and his subsequent trial and conviction for those offences.
18	Ofcom clears Channel 4's drama-documentary UKIP: The First 100 Days of breaching its regulations following an investigation. The film had attracted in excess of 6,000 complaints, many of them as part of an orchestrated campaign from the far-right Britain First movement.
18	Ofcom launches an investigation into ITV's Good Morning Britain for potential impartiality over an interview its presenters Kate Garraway and Ben Shephard did with Nigel Farage on 1 May. The pair asked Farage about his chances of being elected as MP for South Thanet, but did not reflect the positions of other candidates standing in the constituency. The regulatory body also launches an investigation into an edition of The Paul O'Grady Show aired in April during which presenter Paul O'Grady was seen inhaling helium, an activity that can be dangerous since helium gas cuts off the oxygen supply to the brain.
19	BBC Radio 2 presenter Chris Evans announces that Jeremy Clarkson will be a guest on the 21 May edition of his breakfast show, where the pair will discuss Clarkson's departure from Top Gear. The interview is Clarkson's first since leaving the programme. During his subsequent appearance on the show, Clarkson describes the reason for his sacking from Top Gear as being "my own silly fault".
21	ITV airs the 2015 British Soap Awards, which is watched by 3.9 million viewers. ITV's scheduling, and some of its editing of the ceremony's content, draws criticism from EastEnders producer Dominic Treadwell-Collins, who feels that ITV did not play fairly by airing an hour-long episode of Emmerdale head-to-head with EastEnders before showing coverage of the event.
23	Sweden's Måns Zelmerlöw wins the 2015 Eurovision Song Contest with "Heroes". Australia's Guy Sebastian achieves fifth place with "Tonight Again", while the UK's entry, Electro Velvet's "Still in Love with You" finishes 24th out of 27.
26	The BBC announces that its music panel quiz Never Mind the Buzzcocks is to end after 18 years and 28 series.
27	Comedian Miranda Hart tells BBC News that reports she would be hosting a rebooted series of The Generation Game were "massively blown out of order in the press" after she held an informal discussion with the BBC about the viability of making a modern version of the show. The Generation Game will not be returning to television any time in the near future.
28	Big Brother contestant Aaron Frew has been removed from the series for inappropriate behaviour after flashing at a fellow housemate the previous evening, it is confirmed.
28	The BBC Trust rejects complaints that the number plate chosen for the Top Gear Patagonia Special aired over Christmas 2014 was deliberately chosen to make reference to the Falklands War.
28	The BBC is accused of making a Hunger Games style reality show after the announcement of Britain's Hardest Grafter, a five-part BBC Two series that will see 25 of Britain's lowest-paid workers competing against each other for a cash prize of £15,000, the equivalent to a year's living wage salary. The BBC defends the series, claiming it is a "serious social experiment". By 1 June a petition to stop the programme has been signed by 24,000 people.
28	BBC One airs the Panorama documentary Britain's Secret Terror Deals, which alleges that British security forces were involved in dozens of murders during the Troubles in Northern Ireland.
28	ITV hires former BBC Panorama editor Tom Giles as its new head of current affairs, replacing Ian Squires, who announced he would be leaving the position after 20 years following the recent general election.
29	Dan Taylor-Watt, the head of BBC iPlayer, posts a blog on the BBC website defending the popularity of the service after figures showed a decline in its viewership in recent months. Taylor-Watt stresses that iPlayer is more popular in the winter.
30	BBC One airs the 2015 FA Cup Final, which sees Arsenal score a 4–0 victory over Aston Villa. Overnight figures suggest the coverage to have been watched by 7.5 million viewers.
31	Dancing dog act Jules O'Dwyer & Matisse win the ninth series of Britain's Got Talent. The win is quickly mired in controversy, however, when it emerges that Matisse was substituted with a stunt dog, Chase, for a high-wire act because Matisse is scared of heights, a fact not made clear to the public. Amid a subsequent public backlash, the show's producers say they should have made it clearer a different dog was being used, while Ofcom considers an investigation into whether phone voters were misled.

=== June ===
Date	Event
1	Ofcom says it will take no further action against BT Sport after rugby commentator Simon Ward described players as "rug munchers" during the 2015 European Rugby Challenge Cup match between Newcastle Falcons and Newport Gwent Dragons. Ward issued an on-air apology for his use of the phrase after being unaware that it can be used as a derogatory term for lesbians.
1	Outside Source and Business Live make their debut on the BBC News Channel after being launched on BBC World News in February 2014 and March 2015 respectively.
2	Director of BBC News James Harding rejects claims from politicians that the BBC's general election coverage was biased. The comments prompt media mogul Rupert Murdoch to claim that Harding, a former editor of The Times, is "going native".
3	The BBC launches an internal investigation after international news outlets wrongly reported that Queen Elizabeth II had been hospitalised following a rogue tweet sent by one of its reporters during an obituary rehearsal.
5	While a guest on the day's edition of The Daily Politics, founder of the @CoolEdMiliband Twitter account, Richard Biggs, is forced to apologise after saying that "Ed Miliband's too good for this fucking country to be honest".
5	Mock the Week reaches its 10th anniversary.
6	The BBC's coverage of the 2015 FIFA Women's World Cup begins with the opening match between China and Canada.
6	World News Today is included in the weekend schedule of the BBC News Channel, airing at 9:00 pm.
8	Daniel Radcliffe and Lena Headey are among 750 signatories from the world of film and television to put their name to a petition urging the BBC Trust to reverse its decision to turn BBC Three into an online only service.
9	BT Sport announces that it will introduce charges for viewers to watch top-flight European football from August. It has also recruited Gary Lineker, Rio Ferdinand and Steven Gerrard to its presenting team.
9	Speaking to the Radio Times, former Blue Peter presenter Yvette Fielding criticises the BBC's decision to move the show from BBC One to the CBBC Channel because "[It] deserves to be on mainstream television".
10	Clare Balding is to replace John Inverdale as presenter of the BBC's Wimbledon highlights show during coverage of the 2015 Wimbledon Championships. The programme will also be renamed Wimbledon 2Day. Following its launch the new format is quickly panned by both critics and viewers who are critical of the amount of studio banter between Balding and her guests compared to actual tennis coverage. As a result of the show's ongoing unpopularity the format is changed for the second week of the Wimbledon fortnight, with a move of venue, while the live audience is ditched.
10	Ofcom says that 1,162 people have so far complained about an interview Sky News presenter Kay Burley did on 3 June with the chief executive of Alton Towers following a roller-coaster accident at the theme park. Burley pressed Nick Varney to confirm whether one of the people injured in the crash had lost a leg. In addition to the Ofcom complaints, 27,000 have signed a change.org petition calling for the regulator to launch an investigation into the matter.
12	Channel 4 airs a one-off edition of Chris Evans's chat show TFI Friday to celebrate its 20th anniversary, which is watched by 3.7 million viewers. Following the programme's success, the channel announces on 23 June that it has commissioned a full series of eight episodes.
13	Lenny Henry and Benedict Cumberbatch are among those from the world of entertainment to be recognised in the 2015 Birthday Honours; Henry receiving a knighthood and Cumberbatch a CBE.
14	Broadcaster Jonathan Dimbleby warns of "enemies" who wish to diminish the BBC, and urges against any cuts to the licence fee as the time approaches for the renewal of the BBC's Charter.
15	Ofcom says it will not launch an investigation into Kay Burley's Sky News interview with the boss of Alton Towers. However, the regulator says it will look into whether viewers of Britain's Got Talent were misled over the stunt dog incident. Ofcom also criticises Piers Morgan for laughing during his interview with French climber Alain Robert after the latter repeatedly used the F-word, but says it will take no further action over the incident because co-presenter Susanna Reid quickly apologised, and ITV edited the offensive language out of the segment for its timeshift channel and the online content available through ITV Player. A pre-election interview with UKIP leader Nigel Farage in which he was asked about his chances of winning a parliamentary seat is also deemed to have not breached the rules.
15	Sky Atlantic airs the season five finale of Game of Thrones. Overnight figures suggest it to have been watched by 1.7 million viewers.
16	The BBC announce that Chris Evans will become the new presenter of Top Gear, while the final edition of the programme to feature Jeremy Clarkson is confirmed to air on 28 June. The following day Evans confirms that a female co-presenter will join him on the show, but BBC Two Controller Kim Shillinglaw plays down the idea, saying there will be "no gender diktats" over the line-up of the presenting team.
16	Producers of The X Factor announce that Rita Ora and Nick Grimshaw will join the judging panel for the twelfth series, replacing Mel B and Louis Walsh. It is also confirmed that Ora will be leaving The Voice UK to take up her X Factor role.
16	After four years of airing the British Comedy Awards, Channel 4 announces that it has dropped the ceremony from its schedule in order to focus on other projects.
16	US broadcaster AMC Networks announce plans to launch in the UK on the YouView platform.
17	BBC Two airs the first in a series of televised debates ahead of the 2015 Labour Party leadership election which sees the potential candidates hoping to succeed Ed Miliband go head-to-head in front of a studio audience.
18	Jesse Norman is appointed as Chair of the House of Commons Culture, Media and Sport Committee, replacing John Whittingdale, who became Culture Secretary following the general election.
18	Rochelle Humes and Melvin Odoom are revealed as the new presenters of ITV2's The Xtra Factor, replacing Caroline Flack and Olly Murs, who have taken over presenting of The X Factor.
19	Jeremy Clarkson tells The Sun the BBC offered him a new contract to return to Top Gear shortly before Chris Evans was announced as the show's new presenter, but that he rejected the idea because there would have been too much interference from executives. Responding to the claims the BBC says that Clarkson was not offered a chance to return to his former presenting role.
21	BBC Director-General Tony Hall tells BBC One's The Andrew Marr Show that he believes the licence fee has probably a decade left before it is reformed. The comments are made after BBC Political Correspondent Nick Robinson claims that Prime Minister David Cameron told journalists on a campaign bus during the general election that he would "close down" the BBC.
23	Vice Media announces it has agreed a deal with Unilever to launch Broadly, a new TV channel aimed at women.
25	Ofcom have received over 1,000 complaints from viewers about an edition of Big Brother from the previous day in which contestant Helen Wood compared her fellow housemate Brian Belo to a rapist and murderer. Belo left the show following the incident, while Wood and another housemate received a formal warning from the programme's producers. Wood subsequently expresses regret over her comments. Ofcom decides in July that the incident does not warrant an investigation because the episode was broadcast after 9:00 pm, and as Channel 5 had broadcast appropriate warnings about the programme before it was aired.
25	After the Women's World Cup proves popular with viewers, and having increased BBC Three's viewership, the BBC switches coverage of England's 27 June quarter final match against Canada to BBC One.
25	ITV News political editor Tom Bradby is appointed as the main anchor for News at Ten, replacing Mark Austin who will move back to the ITV Evening News. News at Ten is returning to its single-presenter format from the autumn, with Julie Etchingham and Rageh Omaar presenting in Bradby's absence.
27	Rapper Kanye West's appearance at Glastonbury 2015 is aired by BBC Two as part of the BBC's coverage of the event. By 29 June, West's use of bad language during the performance has prompted 44 complaints to Ofcom.
28	BBC Two airs the final edition of Top Gear to be presented by Jeremy Clarkson, Richard Hammond and James May, a 75-minute compilation of footage shot before the trio quit the show. After its broadcast Clarkson says that he is "so sad and sorry it's ended like this".
29	The BBC is reviewing its use of the term "Islamic State" when reporting news items about the Islamic extremist group that has established a self-declared caliphate in the Middle East, after receiving a letter signed by 120 MPs, and supported by Prime Minister David Cameron, expressing concern that media use of the term legitimises the group. The letter calls on media outlets to adopt the name Daesh instead, a term used by media in other countries such as Turkey and France. However, BBC Director-General Tony Hall subsequently rejects calls for the BBC to adopt the use of Daesh—an Arabic term meaning "one who sows discord"—since he feels it would not be impartial and create the impression of having support for the group's opponents. Instead he says the BBC will use terms such as "Islamic State group".
29	Eurosport and its parent channel Discovery are awarded the European broadcast rights for the Olympic Games beginning in 2018 following a €1.3 billion (£922 million) deal with the International Olympic Committee. The deal applies from 2022 in the UK, where 200 hours of Olympic coverage must be provided free-to-air.
29	Ofcom rejects 300 viewer complaints about the outfits worn by Amanda Holden and Alesha Dixon during the 2015 final of Britain's Got Talent. Viewers had complained that the dresses were too revealing for a programme aired before the 9.00 pm watershed, but Ofcom rules the clothing was appropriate, and there is no need for an investigation into the matter.
30	The BBC Trust provisionally approves plans to move BBC Three online from January 2016. At the same time the Trust also recommends rejecting plans for a BBC One timeshift channel because it "fails the public value test and should be rejected". The announcement of BBC Three's potential fate prompts Jimmy Mulville and Jon Thoday—who offered £100 million to save the channel—to urge John Whittingdale to review the decision and link it with negotiations for the Corporation's charter renewal. Mulville and Thoday also threaten to invoke a judicial review if BBC Three's closure is confirmed.

=== July ===
Date	Event
1	Ofcom introduces changes to the way phone-in competitions and votes on television and radio shows are advertised in an attempt to make them easier to understand.
1	BBC One airs England's semi-final Women's World Cup clash with Japan, which sees England exiting the contest. Overnight figures suggest it was watched by 1.7 million viewers.
2	The BBC announce 1,000 job cuts to make savings because of a shortfall of income brought in from the licence fee.
4	BBC Three airs the third place play-off between England and Germany. Overnight figures suggest it was watched by 1.4 million viewers.
5	A block of auditions for the next series of The X Factor that were scheduled to begin in Manchester are cancelled following the death of Simon Cowell's mother. Auditions for Monday 6 July and Tuesday 7 July do not go ahead, but resume on Wednesday 8 July.
5	The 2015 FIFA Women's World Cup Final between the United States and Japan is aired on BBC Two. The coverage is watched by an audience of 500,000.
6	BBC Three announces a season of programmes focusing on people with disabilities. The Defying the Label season begins on 20 July, and will feature fifteen programmes including drama, documentaries, current affairs programmes and a comedy panel game show.
6	Following reports that appeared in the previous day's Sunday newspapers, Culture Secretary John Whittingdale confirms that the BBC will fund free TV licences for people over the age of 75 from 2018, the cost having previously been covered by the Treasury. Plans to introduce a legal requirement for a licence in order to view the BBC iPlayer service will also be brought forward.
7	It is reported that former television presenter Michael Barrymore has launched legal proceedings against Essex Police over his arrest following the 2001 death of Stuart Lubbock, who was found dead in the swimming pool of Barrymore's house.
8	The Advertising Standards Authority clears an advertising campaign for L'Oréal moisturising cream that featured Helen Mirren following claims her appearance had been digitally altered.
8	Coronation Street residents learn of the death of Deirdre Barlow (played by Anne Kirkbride) in an episode that sees her friend Bev Unwin (Susie Blake) breaking the news of Deirdre's passing to her on screen husband Ken Barlow (William Roache). Deirdre was written out of the series following the death of Kirkbride earlier this year.
9	Nick Robinson is to step down from the role of BBC News's political editor in order to succeed James Naughtie as presenter of BBC Radio 4's Today programme. He will also report on news and current affairs for radio and television.
9	The BBC and ITV secure a joint deal to air the Six Nations Championship for five years from 2016, an agreement that retains the competition as a free-to-air event.
12	John Whittingdale announces the establishment of an eight-person advisory board to carry out a fundamental review of the BBC ahead of its charter renewal. Figures sitting on the board include Dawn Airey, the former Chief Executive of Channel 5, and former Ofcom chair Colette Bowe.
13	ITV airs two episodes of Coronation Street covering the funeral of Deirdre Barlow. Overnight figures suggest the episodes were watched by an average of 7.6 million viewers, peaking at 7.9 million.
15	A host of high-profile figures in the world of entertainment, including JK Rowling, Chris Evans and Daniel Craig, have written to David Cameron, The Daily Telegraph reports, warning him against major cuts to the BBC and expressing their concern that a diminished BBC would lead to a diminished Britain.
16	The Government publishes its green paper on the future of the BBC. In the wake of its publication, Shadow Culture Secretary Chris Bryant calls for an investigation into whether sources at the Department of Culture, Media and Sport leaked details of the document's content to the media after several suggestions made in the green paper were reported in the press prior to its publication.
16	Ofcom rejects BT's request for an investigation into the pay-TV market, but says its digital communications review will look at how easy Pay-TV customers are able to switch providers, as well as the effect the inclusion of sport in subscription packages has on competition.
16	Chloe Wilburn wins the sixteenth series of Big Brother.
20	Rain during the first two days of the 2015 Open Championship requires the contest to be extended for an extra day, and BBC One to schedule an extra day of coverage at the eleventh hour.
21	Ofcom reveals that it has received 48 complaints about an episode of EastEnders that featured an intimate scene between two gay characters at a funeral home. The episode, aired on 17 July, featured Ben Mitchell (played by Harry Reid) and Paul Coker (Jonny Labey) embracing semi-naked next to an open coffin.
21	The BBC announces The Hunt, a major new nature series exploring the relationship between predator and prey, which will be presented by David Attenborough.
22	The BBC Trust launches a public consultation about the Corporation's future.
22	A report from GlobalWebIndex estimates that as many as 60 million viewers outside the UK are using proxy internet servers to access BBC iPlayer. Content on iPlayer is viewable to UK internet users only, but can be seen elsewhere by using a proxy server to mask the viewer's actual location
22	Laura Kuenssberg is named the BBC's new Political Editor, replacing Nick Robinson.
24	Kimberly Wyatt wins the 2015 series of Celebrity MasterChef.
28	ITV have reported a 25% increase in pre-tax profits for the first half of 2015, despite a 4% decrease in viewing figures over the same period.
28	Speaking to the Radio Times ahead of the launch of her new panel show, If Katie Hopkins Ruled the World, former The Apprentice contestant Katie Hopkins says that she is in favour of introducing euthanasia vans because there are "far too many old people".
28	Good Morning Britain presenters Ben Shephard and Kate Garraway are forced to apologise to viewers after guest Helen Mirren describes how it "pissed with rain non-stop" during a camping trip while being interviewed by the pair.
29	Sky reports an annual profit of £11.3 billion for 2014–15, and have also reached 12 million customers in the UK and Ireland for the first time in the company's history.
29	Meirion Jones, the former head of investigations at Newsnight claims that he and other journalists who tried to expose Jimmy Savile were forced out of the Corporation, an allegation rejected by the BBC.
29	Ofcom has fined the Zee Network's Hindi language Lamhe Channel £25,000 over misleading advice given by a doctor on the programme Yoga for You about treating cancer and hernias.
30	Amazon Prime announce a deal with Jeremy Clarkson, Richard Hammond and James May that will see them present a Top Gear-style show for Amazon Instant Video. The programme will be produced by former Top Gear producer Andy Wilman, and begin airing in 2016. The news comes as Chris Evans signs former Big Breakfast producer Lisa Clark as Top Gear's executive producer, replacing Wilman for the relaunched version.
31	International telecommunications giant Liberty Global increases its stake in ITV from 6.4% to 9.9%, but says that it has no intention of taking over the commercial broadcaster.

=== August ===
Date	Event
1	BBC One airs the 2015 FA Women's Cup Final, the first FA Women's Cup Final to be held at Wembley. The match sees Chelsea beat Notts County 1–0.
2	The death is announced of singer and television presenter Cilla Black, who is believed to have died from natural causes at her home in Spain. The following day ITV announce that it will air an updated version of its 2013 documentary The One and Only Cilla Black, as well as repeating the 2014 biopic Cilla that starred Sheridan Smith as Black. The documentary will air on 4 August, while Cilla will air over three consecutive nights beginning on 4 August.
2	BT Sport apologises after some viewers were unable to access its coverage of the 2015 FA Community Shield via online streaming or through its sports app because of high demand.
4	An autopsy has determined that Cilla Black died from a stroke during a fall at her Spanish home, her family confirms. A subsequent inquest held in her home town of Liverpool on 14 August records a verdict of accidental death.
4	The BBC announces that its Saturday night game show, Prized Apart, has been axed after one series because of disappointing ratings.
5	Sky announces that it will air Alex Gibney's documentary Going Clear: Scientology and the Prison of Belief on Sky Atlantic at 9:00 pm on 21 September. Previous plans to show the film, which alleges abusive practices at the Church of Scientology's US headquarters, were shelved by Sky amid legal concerns as the film will be viewable in Northern Ireland, which is not subject to the Defamation Act 2013.
5	The BBC is forced to deny claims made in a Daily Mail article that its creative director, Alan Yentob, attempted to influence a Newsnight report into the troubled children's charity Kids Company, of which he is chairman, hours before it was broadcast.
5	Sky Sports confirms it has signed a three-year deal with Spain's La Liga to retain the rights to show matches from the Spanish league.
5	Rachel Corp, the current head of home news at ITV is appointed editor of ITV News London, replacing Alex Chandler.
5	Reece Shearsmith and Rufus Hound are among those to be making guest appearances in the ninth series of Doctor Who, which returns on Saturday 19 September.
6	Ofcom launches an investigation into complaints that Sky has been ignoring requests from its customers who wish to cancel their contracts.
6	The BBC announces plans for a docudrama about the death of Mark Duggan that will seek to challenge the media portrayal of him as a gangster.
6	The BBC's Songs of Praise is to feature a segment recorded in a migrant camp in Calais, it is reported.
6	Alan Yentob is interviewed by Channel 4 News's Matt Frei, where he is questioned about financial mismanagement at Kids Company and whether he attempted to influence a Newsnight report about the charity. He vehemently denies any wrongdoing, and later apologises for becoming emotional.
7	The compilation album The Very Best of Cilla Black reaches No. 14 in the UK Albums Chart following her recent death, giving the singer and television presenter her highest album chart position since 1968.
7	The BBC announces it has commissioned The Living and the Dead, a six-part supernatural drama set in the Victorian era West Country and starring Colin Morgan and Charlotte Spencer.
11	The BBC announces it has commissioned a new motoring game show, The Getaway Car, presented by Dermot O'Leary and featuring Top Gear's The Stig.
11	ITV announces it has axed the afternoon chat show Mel and Sue after one series because of poor ratings.
11	ITV announces that it has bought a share in the YouTube venture Channel Mum.
12	Comedy Central UK have signed a new deal with Warner Bros TV to continue showing repeats of Friends until 2019. To celebrate the announcement, Comedy Central announces a week-long "FriendsFest" to be staged in London's Brick Lane.
12	Senior Church of England figures defend the BBC's decision to record an episode of Songs of Praise in a Calais migrant camp after the Daily Express and The Sun carried articles criticising it as a waste of licence fee payers' money.
13	Channel 4 announces that it has taken a minority stake in Whisper Films, a sports production company owned by Jake Humphrey and David Coulthard.
14	Singers Paloma Faith and Boy George will join the coaching panel on the fifth series of The Voice UK, replacing Rita Ora and Tom Jones. The announcement comes a day after Jones claimed he had been axed from the series without consultation.
17	Ofcom rules that Britain's Got Talent misled viewers after a second dog was used in the act that won the series 2015 final. ITV have offered to refund viewers who voted for the act, or to donate the cost of any calls to charity. However, the regulator clears EastEnders of breaching its regulations over a scene involving an embrace between two semi-naked gay characters in a funeral parlour. Ofcom also announces that it will launch an investigation into an edition of Ian King Live aired by Sky News on 30 July after presenter Ian King was heard to use the word "The F Word" when his microphone lead fell out during an interview.
18	Ofcom rules that BBC World News and CNN International broke UK broadcasting rules regarding sponsorship and funded content after airing programmes funded by foreign governments, charities and other organisations. Viewers were unaware of the origin of the content that was broadcast between 2008 and 2011.
19	The Royal Television Society (RTS) announces the launch of an Awards for Northern Ireland, with the first ceremony due to be held to coincide with the Belfast Media Festival, which takes place annually in November.
20	The funeral of Cilla Black takes place at St Mary's Church, Woolton in Liverpool. The following day her Very Best of compilation reaches number one in the UK Albums Chart, becoming the first album by the singer to top the charts.
23	The Met Office confirms it has lost the contract to provide weather forecasts for the BBC. A new forecaster will be announced later in 2015 and take over in 2016, although the on air presenting team is not expected to change, and Met Office severe weather warnings will continue to be used by BBC Weather.
23	Reports in the Belfast Telegraph and other Irish newspapers suggest that the UK-based ITV plc will make a takeover bid for Northern Ireland-based UTV Media. UTV confirms the following day that it is in "ongoing" talks with ITV to sell the television arm of its business.
27	BBC One is named channel of the year at the Edinburgh Television Festival annual awards.
27	Scottish First Minister Nicola Sturgeon appears at the Edinburgh International Television Festival and calls for a greatly enhanced BBC presence in Scotland, including the creation of a BBC Scotland TV channel, as well as a second English language radio station alongside BBC Radio Scotland. Writer and satirist Armando Iannucci delivers the Festival's annual MacTaggart Lecture and delivers a passionate defence of the BBC.
28	American glamour model Tila Tequila is ejected from the sixteenth series of Celebrity Big Brother on the series' second day of transmission after pictures emerged of her posing in front of Auschwitz concentration camp dressed in a Nazi uniform.

=== September ===
Date	Event
2	BBC Breakfast presenter Bill Turnbull confirms his intention to leave the programme after fifteen years.
2	ITV issues an apology after viewers complained about a poll conducted by the daytime chat show Loose Women asking whether rape was ever a woman's fault.
2	Tracey, the often seen but silent Queen Vic barmaid played by Jane Slaughter, is to finally have a speaking role in a major EastEnders storyline later this month, it is revealed. Tracey will be heard on screen when she is contacted by her friend, Kathy Beale (Gillian Taylforth), who was believed to have been killed in a car crash in 2006.
3	Sky 1 announces it has commissioned Bring the Noise, a music themed panel game show in a similar vein to the now defunct BBC Two series Never Mind the Buzzcocks. The programme will be presented by Ricky Wilson of the Kaiser Chiefs, with Nicole Scherzinger and Tinie Tempah as team captains.
5	As Strictly Come Dancing returns for its thirteenth series, Eggheads panellist CJ de Mooi claims he was rejected from becoming a contestant in the programme after asking for a same-sex dance partner.
6	Neil Hunt, the chief product officer with Netflix tells the Digital Spy website that the streaming service rejected the idea of signing up the former presenters of Top Gear because "it wasn't worth the money".
7	BBC Director-General Tony Hall sets out the coming decade's plans for the Corporation that include collaborating with its commercial rivals, allowing rival broadcasters to take advantage of iPlayer, and new services for Russia and North Korea. However, he stresses that the strategy is not "expansionist".
7	Police have charged businessman Doug Richard, one of the original Dragons' Den panellists, with three counts of sexual activity with a child and one count of causing or inciting a child to engage in sexual activity. He is convicted of the charges in January 2016.
7	Maxine Peake will play Rebekah Brooks in a new Comic Strip film that re-imagines the News International phone hacking scandal as a 1970s Watergate-style controversy. Provisionally titled The Comic Strip Presents ... The Red Top!, the 75-minute film will be aired on Gold.
7	The Countryside Alliance have called on the BBC to sack presenter Chris Packham after he criticised leading conservation groups for sitting on the fence over fox hunting, badger culling and the plight of hen harriers in a recent article published by BBC Wildlife magazine.
9	The CBBC Channel airs a 60-minute programme celebrating thirty years of The Broom Cupboard, the studio from which CBBC continuity programming was broadcast. The programme features past CBBC presenters, including Andi Peters, Phillip Schofield, Zoë Ball and Edd the Duck.
10	Sky and BT have secured a three-year extension to their deal with the Scottish Premier League, enabling them to show at least thirty games per season from Scotland until 2020.
10	The BBC announces that Anne Robinson will step down as presenter of Watchdog after fifteen years to present a new factual series for BBC One.
12	As part of its Saturday night schedule ITV airs United 93, a film about events aboard United Airlines Flight 93 on 11 September 2001, which is followed by the game show Jackpot247. Presenter Emma Lee introduces the programme as follows: "Thank you so much for coming in for an emergency landing with us tonight. Brace yourselves, it's going to be good. Hope you enjoyed the movie there on ITV. Now though, it is time for you to sit tight and enjoy our games." Her comments provoke an immediate negative reaction on social media, with people commenting that they were in poor taste given the nature of the preceding film. Lee issues an on-air apology after being made aware of the situation, and claims she had not known of the film's content. Jackpot247 subsequently launches an investigation into the matter.
14	Ofcom has launched an investigation into Fighting Terror with Torture, an edition of BBC One's Panorama aired on 3 August that showed graphic reconstructions of CIA interrogation methods that have been condemned as torture. They included scenes of a reporter locked inside a blackout box, walling and waterboarding.
14	Michael Dugher is appointed as Shadow Culture Secretary, replacing Chris Bryant.
15	BBC Director-General Tony Hall tells the Culture, Media and Sport Select Committee that there are no plans to close CBBC or CBeebies.
15	Speaking to the Radio Times, comedian Graham Norton criticises The X Factor for having "lost its credibility".
16	The Daily Mirror reports that Jenna Coleman will leave her Doctor Who role as Clara Oswald in the upcoming series, and is lined up for a major role as Queen Victoria in an ITV drama about the monarch. Two days later Coleman confirms that she has filmed her final scenes for Doctor Who, telling BBC Radio 1 "I have left the Tardis – it's happened".
16	Tim Wonnacott's future as a presenter of BBC One's Bargain Hunt is unclear following reports of a "bust up" with producers. While the BBC has confirmed that stand-in presenters will be used to record the remainder of the current series of Bargain Hunt they have not commented on the situation with Wonnacott. Wonnacott announces on 25 November that he is stepping down from the role as Bargain Hunt presenter after twelve years.
16	In a speech addressing the issue of competition between the BBC and its commercial rivals, Culture Secretary John Whittingdale suggests that BBC One could be forced to move its Ten O'Clock News bulletin to prevent a clash with ITV's News at Ten. Whittingdale also criticises BBC One for failing to include enough distinctive programming in its schedule. The following week it is reported that the BBC is considering extending the 10:00 pm bulletin by ten minutes as part of a shake-up of the BBC One evening schedule.
17	During an appearance on BBC One's Question Time newly appointed Shadow Chancellor John McDonnell apologises for a 2003 speech in which he called for members of the IRA to be honoured for the bombings that brought the British government "to the negotiating table" during the peace process, and for a joke he made in 2010 about wishing he could go back in time to assassinate Margaret Thatcher.
17	Brendan Cole wins the first series of Flockstars with sheepdog partner Hoggy.
18	Jeremy Clarkson is confirmed as a guest presenter for Have I Got News for You when the series returns on 2 October. The episode, which sees Clarkson's first BBC appearance since he was sacked from Top Gear earlier in the year, attracts an audience of 4.46 million viewers (a 20.8% share).
18	The BBC announce plans to launch a subscription based video streaming service in the United States.
18	ITV begins airing coverage of the 2015 Rugby World Cup. The opening match between England and Fiji is watched by an average audience of 7.8 million, making the game the most watched sporting event of 2015 at the time of its transmission.
18	A special edition of Deal or No Deal to celebrate the game show's tenth anniversary sees presenter Noel Edmonds play the game for the first time; he raises £26,000 for Children's Hospice.
18	UTV launches a new version of its UTV Player, allowing viewers to stream live content for the first time.
19	The Magician's Apprentice, the opening episode of the ninth series of Doctor Who, airs on BBC One. Overnight figures suggest it was watched by an average of 4.6 million viewers (a 22% audience share), a figure 2 million fewer than the opening episode of the eighth series in 2014.
21	Ofcom finds Fox News in breach of its regulations over comments made by presenter Steve Emerson in January, when he claimed that Birmingham was a "no go zone" for non-Muslims.
21	A caller to Channel 5's The Wright Stuff is reprimanded for his choice of language and taken off air after making reference to Piggate, a scandal involving allegations about Prime Minister David Cameron, during a debate about the possibility of Labour MPs unhappy with the election of Jeremy Corbyn as the party's new leader defecting to the Liberal Democrats.
22	This date marks the 60th anniversary of the launch of ITV.
22	An edition of Big Brother's Bit on the Side is taken off air ten minutes ahead of schedule after a fight between two of the guests. Former housemate Aisleyne Horgan-Wallace is seen to apparently throw champagne at current series contestant Farrah Abraham. The incident subsequently becomes the subject of a police investigation following reports that actress Vicki Michelle was injured during the fracas. Abraham, and fellow contestant Janice Dickinson, are later cautioned by police for involvement in the incident in which Michelle was hurt.
23	ITV airs an hour-long live episode of Coronation Street as part of the channel's 60th anniversary celebrations. Viewers are also given the chance to view the episode as it would be seen by the film crew with a special online stream from cameras positioned around the set.
24	The government is forced to reaffirm its position that no decision has been made on the future of Channel 4 after a senior official was photographed in possession of a document that sets out plans for the privatisation of the publicly funded commercial broadcaster.
24	James Hill wins the sixteenth series of Celebrity Big Brother.
26	England's first round Rugby World Cup match against Wales, which sees England dramatically beaten by their Home Nations rival, draws a peak audience of 11.6 million, a 49% audience share, and the largest viewership for a rugby match aired by ITV since the 2007 Final. On average the game was seen by 8.3 million (a 38% audience share).
28	Lord Burns will step down as chairman of Channel 4 on 27 January 2016, it is announced. Ofcom had recommended he remain in the post for another year while the government decides the broadcaster's future, and his departure has fuelled speculation that Channel 4 will be privatised since it was an option not favoured by him.
28	Ofcom takes the unusual step of launching an investigation into a programme that received no viewer complaints. The matter concerns an edition of Channel 4's Dispatches that aired on 23 February 2015 and concerned a "cash for access" sting involving former Foreign Secretaries Jack Straw and Malcolm Rifkind, both of whom were cleared of wrongdoing following an Independent Parliamentary Standards Authority investigation.
29	Speaking to the Radio Times, BBC One controller Charlotte Moore says she would not rule out the idea of a female taking the lead role in Doctor Who.
29	At 9:00 pm, Channel 4 revamps its presentation for a fifth time. The refreshed look ditches the '4' logo, with it now only seen in print advertising and on the DOG on the HD channel.
30	The BBC announces that it is to relinquish its live coverage of the Open Championship a year earlier than planned. From 2016 Sky will carry live footage of the competition while the BBC will air highlights. The BBC's radio and online coverage will continue to be live, however.
30	The BBC announces its "biggest song search ever" to find the UK's entry for the Eurovision Song Contest 2016. The final decision will be taken by a professional panel and, for the first time since 2010, the public.

=== October ===
Date	Event
1	Launch of YourTV on Freeview and YouView, Fox UK's first free-to-air channel and which is targeted at women.
1	Morning Has Broken, a comedy by Julia Davis and starring David Schwimmer as a US radio presenter brought in to revitalise a failing breakfast show is among programmes commissioned by Channel 4 for 2016, the broadcaster has announced.
1	Speaking at Big Think 2015, an event held in London by TV marketing body Thinkbox, comedian Lenny Henry says that television has taken "baby steps" towards improving the representation of black, Asian and minority ethnic people, but questioned whether the policy of having quotas of different groups of people was the right way forward.
1	Author Patrick Ness will make his screenwriting debut with Class, a Doctor Who spin-off aimed at teenagers, which will air on BBC Three in 2016.
2	Supermarket retailer Waitrose launches its The Warmest Season advertising campaign featuring a remastered version of A Rather Blustery Day, the signature tune from Disney's 1968 film Winnie the Pooh and the Blustery Day.
3	In their third Rugby World Cup qualifier, England are defeated 33–13 by Australia. The match, aired by ITV, is seen by an average of 8 million viewers (a 36.8% share of the audience), peaking at 11 million (48.8%).
4	The BBC admits that a volcanic eruption shown on the first episode of BBC Two's Patagonia: Earth's Secret Paradise was actually footage from two different volcanoes taken four years apart.
4	Following several days of speculation, it is reported that the BBC economics editor Robert Peston is to move to ITV to become their political editor. He will also present a Sunday morning political programme to rival The Andrew Marr Show. Peston's move to ITV is confirmed by Peston himself three days later; his Sunday morning show will be titled Peston on Sunday.
6	BBC One airs a long-awaited Panorama investigation into allegations of the existence of a Westminster-based paedophile ring. The programme attracts criticism from the Metropolitan Police, which say it could jeopardise their investigation into the allegations.
6	The Advertising Standards Authority bans a television commercial for a Clairol hair colouring product featuring Mad Men actress Christina Hendricks because of its "exaggerated capability of the product".
7	Nadiya Hussain wins the sixth series of The Great British Bake Off.
7	Channel 5's The Wright Stuff becomes the victim of a Twitter hoax after a fake account invites viewers to phone in to a discussion on the show that poses the question "Are people that take selfies more likely to join ISIS?"
8	Channel 4 announces an investment in Spelthorn Community Television, a new TV production company to be launched by Sacha Baron Cohen.
9	Bruce Forsyth has been forced to pull out of presenting the BBC variety show Bruce's Hall of Fame following a fall at home. Doctors have told him to rest for a week; the show will be presented instead by Alexander Armstrong, who was originally lined up to appear as a guest.
9	EastEnders announces the introduction of the soap's first transgender character, who will be played by a transgender actor. Riley Carter Millington will join the cast as Kyle by the end of the year. The announcement is swiftly followed by the news that trans actor Annie Wallace will join Hollyoaks to play a trans teacher.
9	The BBC warns that it may have to axe EastEnders if government reforms went ahead requiring that it would only make a programme if it could not be made by a commercial rival.
12	Former Apprentice star Margaret Mountford is announced as chair of the 2016 Baileys Women's Prize for Fiction.
12	X Factor contestant Tom Bleasby withdraws from the twelfth series of the talent contest "due to personal reasons". He is replaced by Mason Noise, a singer who had previously been voted off the show after getting into a heated argument with Simon Cowell over air time.
12	Waitrose chief executive Mark Price will replace Lord Burns as interim chair of Channel 4 when Burns steps down from the role at the end of January 2016; Price's appointment will be on a temporary basis while another chair is found.
12	ITV News at Ten is relaunched with Tom Bradby as its main anchor. The first edition attracts an audience of 1.3 million, compared to 4.1 million who tune in to the BBC Ten O'Clock News.
13	ITV confirms that Piers Morgan will join Good Morning Britain as a regular member of the presenting team, joining Susanna Reid to present the programme three days a week.
13	Danny Cohen confirms he will step down as the BBC's Director of Television after eight years with the Corporation.
14	Stephen Fry announces he will step down as presenter of QI at the end of Series M; he will be succeeded by Sandi Toksvig, who will become the first female host of a mainstream comedy panel show on British television.
14	The BBC denies a Daily Mirror story that it has axed The Voice UK, and says that it has put in a bid to air a further two series of the talent show.
15	Pensioner Ann Crawford becomes the eighth person to win the £250,000 prize on Deal or No Deal, but almost loses the prize because of a mistake. Having won the prize she is offered the chance to swap her box with Box 23, which can (for example) double, half or null the winning amount, and inadvertently accepts the offer by answering "deal no" rather than "no deal". She is then given a second opportunity by the Banker to accept or decline the offer due to the confusion of her reply; Box 23 is opened to reveal she would have won nothing, which is one of the five potential outcomes.
15	Manchester City Council's planning committee votes to give developers Allied London the go ahead to demolish the former Coronation Street set in Manchester. Campaigners had hoped to preserve the street.
15	During an edition of BBC One's Question Time, an audience member berates Secretary of State for Energy and Climate Change Amber Rudd about government plans to cut child tax credits for working families, highlighting concerns about the proposals and forcing the government to defend its position.
16	The High Court orders ITV2 to pay £4 million to Neville Hendricks, producer of Peter Andre's The Next Chapter after it severed ties with Hendricks' production company over allegations of threats made to Andre.
16	TFI Friday returns for its first full series since 2000. Overnight figures indicate it was seen by a peak audience of 2.15 million.
17	ITV announces that comedian David Morgan has joined the presenting line-up of I'm A Celebrity...Get Me Out of Here Now!, replacing Rob Beckett.
18	ITV airs a 30-second advert containing material from Adele's much awaited forthcoming third album as part of a commercial break during an edition of The X Factor. The singer confirms on 22 October that her new album, 25 will be released on 20 November, with the lead single, "Hello" released on 23 October.
19	The Institute for War and Peace Reporting confirms the death of former BBC journalist Jacky Sutton, who was serving as its acting Iraq director. Sutton, who was on her way to the northern Iraqi city of Irbil, was discovered hanged at Istanbul's Atatürk Airport after missing a connecting flight from London on 17 October. The circumstances of her death are unclear.
19	ITV agrees a £100 million deal with UTV Media plc to buy its television assets. UTV Media will rebrand its remaining assets at a later date, but ITV says it has no plans to rebrand UTV as ITV Northern Ireland.
22	BBC Newsline's coverage of the death of the former First Minister of Northern Ireland, Ian Paisley is named Best News Programme at the Irish Film and Television Awards.
23	Scottish Conservative Party leader Ruth Davidson becomes the first female Scottish politician to appear as a panellist on Have I Got News for You.
24	Sky Movies Greats is temporarily renamed Sky Movies Harry Potter as the channel begins a nine-day run of the Harry Potter film series. The films will also be available through Sky's on demand service for the next year as Sky celebrates the fifteenth anniversary of the release of the film version of Harry Potter and the Philosopher's Stone.
25	It is confirmed that The Abominable Bride, a one-off episode of BBC One's Sherlock to be aired on New Year's Day 2016, will also be simulcast in 100 cinemas around the UK, as well as on the PBS network in the United States.
25	ITV debuts Jekyll & Hyde, an adaptation of the Robert Louis Stevenson novel, at 6:30 pm. By the following day the first episode has attracted 500 complaints because of its scenes of graphic violence, which include a man being bludgeoned to death within the first minute, and would normally not be seen before 9.00 pm. In response ITV says it has no plans to move the rest of the series to a post-watershed slot, but will begin airing it half an hour later from 1 November. The series also comes with a warning that some scenes may be unsuitable for some viewers.
26	The BBC have commissioned The A Word, a six-part drama series about a family struggling to cope when the youngest son is diagnosed with autism, and based on Pilpelim Tsehubim, a series that aired on Israeli television in 2010. The series will star Christopher Eccleston.
26	David Tennant and Catherine Tate will reprise their roles as the Tenth Doctor and travelling companion Donna Noble for three Doctor Who audio dramas, it is reported.
27	Announcement of Adele at the BBC, a one-hour special presented by Graham Norton in which he will talk to Adele about her new album. The show will be recorded before a live audience on 2 November and transmitted later on BBC One. The airdate is subsequently confirmed as 20 November, coinciding with the release of her album, 25. By 19 November, the BBC has sold the programme to broadcasters in thirteen countries, including Norway and New Zealand.
27	The BBC are in talks with a German broadcaster to produce a German version of Citizen Khan, it is reported, with the series centred around a Turkish immigrant family.
28	It is reported that police have used counter-terrorism laws to seize a laptop belonging to Newsnight journalist Secunder Kermani after he is understood to have been in communication with a man in Syria claiming to be a member of Islamic State, and who has featured in Newsnight reports.
29	Prosecutors in Argentina order a judge to reopen an investigation into the Top Gear Patagonia Special amid allegations that a car's number plates were illegally switched to intentionally make reference to the Falklands conflict.
29	An item described as "a world-famous piece owned by a sporting institution" has become the most expensive object to be valued by BBC One's Antiques Roadshow during filming in Harrogate, it is reported. Details of the item, valued at over £1 million, will be revealed when the show is aired in Spring 2016.
29	After receiving 459 complaints from viewers, Ofcom announces it will launch an investigation into ITV horror series Jekyll & Hyde to determine whether it has been appropriately scheduled.
29	Barbara Windsor apologises after telling a Sky News journalist that anyone who doesn't want to wear a poppy can "sod off for all I care". She was speaking at the launch of this year's British Legion Poppy Appeal, and had been asked if she had anything to say to people who refuse to wear a poppy. Windsor had not realised she was speaking on live television.
31	ITV airs the 2015 Rugby World Cup final between Australia and New Zealand. The contest is won by New Zealand, who beat Australia 34–17.
31	Channel 5 series The Saturday Show debuts, presented by Matt Barbet and Gaby Roslin; guests include Ashley Walters, Nina Wadia and Mark Dolan.

=== November ===
Date	Event
2	BBC Two debuts Simply Nigella, the first cookery programme to be presented by Nigella Lawson since her personal life was the subject of a high-profile court case. The programme, aired at 8:30 pm, attracts 2.3 million viewers (a 10.8% audience share), but proves to be to the detriment of the quiz show Only Connect, which was moved forward an hour from its usual slot to make way for Lawson's new show. Having attracted an audience of 2.3 million for its 26 October edition, Only Connect's new timeslot sees it garner a viewership of 1.7 million, a drop of 600,000. The show will return to its usual time once Simply Nigella has finished. The first episode of Simply Nigella also becomes the subject of a social media storm after viewers are shown how to make avocado on toast, with many feeling the recipe is too easy.
3	BBC One confirms it has commissioned a television adaptation of Philip Pullman's His Dark Materials trilogy.
3	ITV confirms that its detective drama series, Lewis will end after the current series because the lead actors, Kevin Whately (who plays DI Robbie Lewis) and Laurence Fox (DS James Hathaway) have decided to retire from the roles.
3	Louis Theroux is to make a follow-up to his 2000 When Louis Met... documentary about Jimmy Savile in which he will seek to "understand the truth more fully" about Savile's activities.
4	A commercial for the BMW 3 series that featured a car being driven at high speed along a coastal road is banned by the Advertising Standards Authority for encouraging dangerous driving.
4	ITV executives have accused their BBC rivals of "arrogance" after BBC Ten O'Clock News anchor Huw Edwards posted a comment on Facebook mocking the revamped ITV News at Ten and its presenter, Tom Bradby for losing viewers. In a subsequent Sunday Times article responding to Edwards' comments Bradby accuses the BBC of behaving like Imperial Rome and wanting to put their commercial rivals out of business.
4	At its annual general meeting in London BSkyB announces the appointment of 21st Century Fox Chief Financial Officer John Nallen as a non-executive director, prompting shareholders to raise concerns about the number of Fox executives appointed to the Sky Board.
4	Prime Minister David Cameron refuses to rule out the prospect of privatisation options for Channel 4 after being asked about the issue at Prime Minister's Questions.
5	Launch of BBC Store, an online video on demand service allowing internet users to buy content from the BBC archives. The service is launched with 70,000 hours worth of programming, including episodes of Doctor Who and Dad's Army, with plans to add more content over time.
5	BBC One's The One Show previews a snippet of Adele performing her new single "Hello" on the forthcoming television special Adele at the BBC.
5	Sian Williams is to leave the BBC after three decades to become a presenter on Five News, replacing Emma Crosby.
5	The inaugural Royal Television Society Northern Ireland Programme Awards are presented at The Mac in Belfast, with BBC Northern Ireland scooping five of the awards for Spotlight, Road, On The Air, Brave New World – New Zealand and Line of Duty.
7	The BBC confirms that The Voice UK has been "poached by another broadcaster", meaning that the fifth series of the singing contest, scheduled to begin in January 2016, will be the last to air on BBC One.
7	A technical glitch delays the evening's National Lottery draw, meaning it cannot be aired live. Instead the draw takes place an hour later than scheduled in front of an independent adjudicator.
8	Outgoing Channel 4 chairman Lord Burns criticises government plans to privatise the broadcaster as of "little financial benefit", and questions Culture Secretary John Whittingdale's handling of the job.
10	NBC Universal announce plans to reduce their London output, as well as closing their operations in Paris and Tokyo. The resulting cuts will see CNBC Europe's London programming reduced by a third to four hours a day, with content coming from the CNBC channel in the US.
10	Ofcom decides not to launch an investigation into an edition of Strictly Come Dancing from October in which judge Bruno Tonioli used the phrase "the bull's bollocks" to describe Jay McGuinness's dance performance, because presenter Tess Daly had quickly apologised for the remark and the show's live element. Ofcom had received nineteen complaints following the incident.
10	George Alagiah presents the BBC News at Six for the first time since announcing his treatment for colorectal cancer has ended. It is his first broadcast since April 2014, and he ends the bulletin by telling the viewers "It's good to be back with you".
11	The IWA Wales Media Audit 2015 warns that Wales is facing a media market failure because BBC Wales and ITV Wales have cut back local programming in the country.
11	Mel Giedroyc is confirmed as one of several famous names who will appear in a television adaptation of The Sound of Music for ITV over Christmas. The live three-hour ITV version is broadcast on 20 December.
12	Sky extend their UK and Ireland deal with US television network HBO to cover customers in Germany, Austria and Italy.
13	UK news outlets begin providing live coverage from Paris after the city is hit by a series of terrorist attacks. Viewing figures released on 16 November indicate that over the days following the attacks the BBC's coverage of events received the larger audience share, while an extended evening bulletin of ITV News on 14 November is seen by slightly more viewers than its BBC rival airing at the same time, with ITV receiving 4.3 million viewers compared to the BBC's 4.2 million.
13	Children in Need 2015 airs on BBC One, with Terry Wogan absent from the role as its presenter for the first time since its launch in 1980. Instead Dermot O'Leary steps in at the last minute after Wogan is advised to pull out following a back operation. By the following day the telethon has raised over £37 million, beating the 2014 amount of £32.6 million.
13	The Guardian reports that the BBC is under pressure from its Scottish executives to commission a flagship Scottish Six news programme to help address growing complaints about its weak coverage of Scottish affairs.
13	Eurosport introduces its largest rebranding since its launch in 1989 in order to change its image as a second-tier sports channel. Changes include a new logo and strapline.
15	ITV postpones an episode of Jekyll & Hyde in the wake of the 13 November terrorist attacks on Paris because part of the storyline features a gunfight.
15	An edition of ITV News aired at 10:55 pm shows Tom Bradby interviewing patrons of a Paris café when rumours of a fresh terrorist attack spark a stampede. The edition is seen by 4.3 million viewers.
15	I'm a Celebrity... Get Me Out of Here! returns for its fifteenth series.
16	Channel 4 chief executive David Abraham warns that news and current affairs output, as well as groundbreaking drama, would suffer under privatisation as the broadcaster would most likely be sold to a private equity firm that would asset strip before selling it on.
17	ITV have offered its staff a 3% pay rise from 2016 after a better than expected performance.
18	The BBC announces details of £150 million of spending cuts, which will include £12 million of cuts in comedy, entertainment and factual programming, a £3 million cut to news services, and £12 million worth of savings in online spending. The BBC Red Button is also expected to be scrapped.
18	The Advertising Standards Authority have banned a number of television and newspaper ads for BT Sport as misleading.
18	Sky unveils Sky Q, a new premium set-top box with touch screen technology that will allow viewers to access web streamed content.
19	Sarah Smith is appointed as the BBC's first Scotland editor, and will take up the role in early 2016.
19	Ella Henderson and Sigma are confirmed as the opening act for the 2015 BBC Sports Personality of the Year Award ceremony, which will be held at Belfast's SSE Arena on 20 December.
19	ITV confirms that filming will soon begin on a new eight-part series of its comedy drama, Cold Feet, which will air in 2016.
19	Channel 5 confirms that episodes of Neighbours will air on the same day as they are broadcast in Australia from January 2016, ending the current time lag of several weeks.
19	The Bastard Executioner, a mediaeval drama filmed in Wales for US TV channel FX, is cancelled after its first series because of low ratings.
19	This Week presenter Andrew Neil uses the opening monologue of his programme to launch a two-minute verbal attack against Islamic State for the terrorist attacks on Paris, describing the group as "Islamist scumbags" and "a bunch of loser jihadists [who] slaughtered a bunch of innocents in Paris to prove the future belongs to them, rather than a civilisation like France". Neil's words quickly win him praise from fellow journalists, including LBC's Iain Dale and The Daily Telegraph's Dan Hodges.
20	The British Film Institute reports the discovery of what it believes to be the first interracial kiss to appear on British television. The scene appears in a live drama produced for ITV in June 1962 titled You in Your Small Corner.
20	ITV confirms that Spencer Matthews has quit the fifteenth series of I'm a Celebrity...Get Me Out of Here! after arriving on the show as a late contestant. Matthews later confirms that he left the programme because he was taking steroids in preparation for a charity boxing match, and had not withdrawn off them properly before taking part in the series.
20	Adele at the BBC airs on BBC One, attracting 4.54 million viewers (a 19.8% audience share).
23	ITV confirms it will air The Voice UK and The Voice Kids from 2017.
23	Comedy Central is rapped by Ofcom for airing trailers for Inside Amy Schumer and South Park that featured explicit language before the 9.00 pm watershed.
23	Ofcom decides not to investigate the Doctor Who episode The Zygon Inversion which showed a doppelgänger of the character Clara Oswald (played by Jenna Coleman) shooting down a plane, and was aired a week after the crash of Metrojet Flight 9268. Complaints were received from 31 viewers that the episode was inappropriate in the aftermath of the crash, but Ofcom concludes that "the science fiction nature of Doctor Who and the storyline created a sufficient distinction from recent events".
24	Matt Lucas and Greg Davies are confirmed as guest stars in the 2015 Doctor Who Christmas Special.
25	Ofcom launches an investigation following an appearance by comedian Jimmy Carr on BBC One's The One Show on 4 November during which he made a joke about dwarves.
26	The BBC Trust approves proposals to close BBC Three, making it an online service from February 2016, but on the proviso that its programmes are aired on BBC One and BBC Two. Plans are also approved to extend the broadcasting hours of the CBBC channel from 7:00 pm to 9:00 pm, with the Trust suggesting parents unhappy with the decision should use the off button.
27	Kirsty Young announces she will step down as presenter of BBC One's Crimewatch, fronting her last episode in December.
29	Broadcaster Chris Evans confirms that Top Gear will return to BBC Two on Sunday 8 May 2016 and that filming is already under way, but no details are given about his co-presenters.
30	Acting BBC Director of Television Mark Linsey says that 90% of BBC One's prime time Christmas output will be original programming this year, despite the need to save £1.6 billion.
30	ITV News confirms that it has appointed current Newsnight political editor Allegra Stratton as its UK national editor, replacing Rohit Kachroo. Kachroo will take up the newly created role of security editor for ITV News.

=== December ===
Date	Event
1	BBC Trust chair Rona Fairhead expresses her concern that the will of licence fee payers is being "drowned out" in the charter renewal debate, and warns that it risks turning the BBC into a "perpetual plaything of the political classes". On the same day Dame Colette Bowe, the former chair of Ofcom, warns that the regulator is not the right body to replace the BBC Trust, as the BBC needs more than a regulator to hold it to account.
1	BBC One launches its 2015 Christmas campaign at 7:30 pm, featuring animations of ten of its biggest stars, including Peter Capaldi and Graham Norton, as well as a cartoon "Sprout Boy". Capaldi also narrates the story of the "Sprout Boy", who embarks on a journey to find friendship at Christmas.
2	Labour MP David Lammy files a complaint with the BBC over the lack of diversity in the make up of Question Time panels, after research indicated that 61% of editions aired over the last five years have featured an all-white panel.
2	Channel 4 News confirms that it has turned down an interview with Prince Charles after being asked to agree to the terms of a fifteen-page contract of restrictions and limitations about the questions which could be asked, a document that it has described as "draconian".
2	Scotland's Culture Secretary, Fiona Hyslop, accuses the BBC of misrepresenting the amount of direct spending on Scottish content, and calls for BBC Scotland to have a more representative share of the licence fee.
2	The BBC announce Bake Off: Creme de la Creme, a Great British Bake Off spin-off for BBC Two which will feature professional pastry chefs, will begin in 2016.
2	Sky 1 announces a deal with Renegade Pictures to air two series of Don't Tell the Bride, which has previously aired on BBC Three.
3	Alan Yentob resigns from his position as Creative Director at the BBC in the wake of the controversy surrounding his role as chairman of collapsed charity Kids Company.
3	The BBC appoints Kamal Ahmed as its economics editor, replacing Robert Peston.
4	ITV apologises after footage of chef Ainsley Harriott is incorrectly featured during a news item about the knighthood of Lenny Henry. ITV News claim the mistake was due to "an error in the production process".
6	Geordie Shore's Vicky Pattison wins the fifteenth series of I'm a Celebrity...Get Me Out of Here!.
7	The BBC apologises to former Aston Villa chairman Doug Ellis following a subtitling gaffe on Match of the Day that linked him with Hezbollah. After Ellis was seen in the crowd at a match against Everton on 21 November, commentator Steve Wilson remarked "Great to see Doug Ellis here in his Villa scarf", but his words were translated as "Great to see Doug Ellis here with Hezbollah" by the voice recognition software used to produce subtitles.
7	50,000 people have signed an online petition calling for boxer Tyson Fury to be removed from the 2015 BBC Sports Personality of the Year Award shortlift following recent comments he made about women, abortion and homosexuality. Athlete Greg Rutherford, who is also included on the shortlist, pulls out of the event in response to the comments, but later says that he will take part in the ceremony.
8	Art teacher Matthew Wilcock wins the first series of The Great Pottery Throw Down.
10	BBC Northern Ireland journalist Andy West says that he has been suspended by the broadcaster after an online post about the Tyson Fury controversy in which he said he was "ashamed" to work for the BBC "when it lacks bravery to admit it is making a mistake".
11	Prime Minister's wife Samantha Cameron and former Shadow Chancellor Ed Balls are revealed to be among celebrities who have signed up for the Great Sport Relief Bake Off, which will air in 2016.
13	Louisa Johnson wins the twelfth series of The X Factor in a final which includes performances from Coldplay, Adele and One Direction. The final is seen by an average 8.4 million viewers, an increase from the 5.1 million who saw the show's penultimate episode on 12 December—the second lowest in its history. Ratings for this year's final are also lower than the 9.1 million who watched the 2014 final. Her single, "Forever Young" debuts at number nine in the UK Singles Chart, the lowest debut entry for an X Factor winner.
16	As a petition to have boxer Tyson Fury removed from the BBC Sports Personality of the Year shortlist attracts 130,000 signatures, BBC Director-General Tony Hall tells the House of Commons Culture, Media and Sport Select Committee that the decision to include him was down to his "sporting prowess", and was taken by an independent panel.
16	Following the concluding episode of the first series of BBC One police drama Cuffs, cast members, including Amanda Abbington (who plays DS Jo Moffat) break the news that the series has been cancelled.
19	New Zealand rugby player Dan Carter is named 2015 BBC Overseas Sports Personality of the Year.
19	Jay McGuinness and dance partner Aliona Vilani win the thirteenth series of Strictly Come Dancing. The final is watched by an average audience of 11 million, an increase on the 10.2 million who saw the 2014 final. Three days after lifting the coveted glitterball trophy Vilani announces she is leaving the show, saying that she had always intended the 2015 series of Strictly to be her last.
20	Simon Schama, Mary Beard and David Olusoga are unveiled as presenters of Civilisation, a major ten-part documentary series for BBC Two about the history of art that is expected to air in late 2017.
20	Andy Murray, who helped to secure the 2015 Davis Cup for Britain, is named this year's BBC Sports Personality of the Year, winning the award for the second time. Rugby League star Kevin Sinfield is second in the public vote to choose the winner, with athlete Jessica Ennis-Hill coming third. Controversial boxer Tyson Fury finishes in fourth place, just 7,000 votes behind Ennis-Hill. Appearing on stage at Belfast's SSE Arena Fury apologises for recent comments he has made, saying that it was "all a bit tongue-in-cheek" and that he had not meant to offend anybody, winning him applause from the audience. Prior to the ceremony a small group of protesters had gathered outside the venue.
20	Joseph Valente wins the eleventh series of The Apprentice. However, due to a late running schedule after Sports Personality of the Year overruns, the identity of the winner is revealed online ten minutes before the end of the final when it is tweeted by the Radio Times social media team.
21	As part of cost-cutting measures the BBC announces that it is "reluctantly" ending its contract to provide Formula One coverage three years early. Channel 4 will take on Formula One coverage from the 2016 season.
21	Following a review of the rules governing Party Political Broadcasts, the BBC announces that the UK Independence Party will be awarded three annual broadcasts outside election time, but that the Green Party will get none.
23	BBC One has commissioned a weekday spin-off of Countryfile following the programme's success in the Sunday evening schedules. Countryfile Diaries will air in spring 2016, although a presenting team is yet to be announced.
24	John Cleese has reprised the character Basil Fawlty for a Specsavers commercial, it is reported.
24	Mark Stinchcombe wins the eighth series of MasterChef: The Professionals.
26	Overnight viewing figures indicate the Queen's Speech, broadcast jointly by BBC One and ITV, to be the most watched programme on Christmas Day, with a combined audience of 7.2 million. The Downton Abbey Christmas Special aired by ITV, and finale of the series, was the most watched programme on a single channel, with an audience of 6.6 million.
27	The Bay City Rollers are announced as the headline act for BBC Scotland's Hogmanay celebrations.
30	Barbara Windsor and Idris Elba are among those from the world of television to be honoured in the 2016 New Year Honours—Windsor becoming a Dame and Elba receiving an OBE.

== Most watched television of this year ==
The entire series of Call the Midwife was successful in the ratings this year, with all eight episodes from its fourth series reaching the Top 20 most watched programmes watched in 2015. Successful drama broadcasts on BBC One continued with EastEnders Live Week surrounding the Who Killed Lucy Beale? storyline. The Voice UK also enjoyed its most successful series ever, with the first six episodes reaching the Top 50.

=== Top 50 most-watched television broadcasts ===
Rank	Show	Number of viewers in millions	Date	Network	Brief description
1	The Great British Bake Off	15.16	7 October	BBC One	The final of the sixth series, which sees Nadiya Hussain crowned the winner.
2	The Great British Bake Off	12.78	30 September	BBC One	The semi-final of the sixth series, featuring the exit of Flora Shedden & Nadiya Hussain was crowned Star Baker for the 3rd Time.
3	The Great British Bake Off	12.67	26 August	BBC One	The fourth episode of the sixth series which focused around baking desserts. It saw the exit of Sandy Docherty while Ian Cumming was crowned Star Baker for the 3rd time.
4	The Great British Bake Off	12.63	2 September	BBC One	The fifth episode of the sixth series which focused on "alternative ingredients" for the first time in this series. This week, eventual winner Nadiya Jamir Hussain ended Ian Cumming's reign as star baker by winning that week's episode. Ugnė Bubnaityte was eliminated.
5	The Great British Bake Off	12.58	16 September	BBC One	The seventh episode of the sixth series, looking at "Victorian baking". Eventual finalist Tamal Ray was star baker for the first time, whilst the reigning star baker, Mat Riley, was eliminated.
6	Strictly Come Dancing	12.55	19 December	BBC One	The final of the thirteenth series, which was won by The Wanted singer Jay McGuinness and Aliona Vilani, beating EastEnders actress Kellie Bright and Coronation Street actress Georgia May Foote. Ellie Goulding also performed.
7	Britain's Got Talent	12.51	31 May	ITV	The two and a half-hour-long final of the 2015 series, where 12 acts competed for £250,000 and a place at the Royal Variety Performance. It was won by Jules O'Dwyer and Matisse, a dog act.
8	The Great British Bake Off	12.37	19 August	BBC One	The third episode of the sixth series focusing on judge Paul Hollywood's specialism, bread. Paul Jagger Created a stunning Lion Bread but was piped to Star Baker by Ian Cumming who won it for the 2nd time, Following two disappointing weeks in the competition, Dorret Conway was eliminated from the competition.
9	Strictly Come Dancing	12.31	19 December	BBC One	The first episode of the final week of the thirteenth series of the show. Kellie Bright and Kevin Clifton achieved two perfect scores for their Tango and Showdance.
10	The Great British Bake Off	12.26	9 September	BBC One	The sixth episode of the sixth series that revolved around pastry. Laddish fireman Mat Riley was star baker for his only time, whilst Alvin Magallanes left the competition.
11	Strictly Come Dancing	11.98	5 December	BBC One	The quarter final which had a "musicals" theme. Jay McGuinness and Aliona Vilani finished at the top of the leaderboard after dancing a rumba to "Falling Slowly" from Once.
12	Strictly Come Dancing	11.86	21 November	BBC One	The annual live show broadcast from the Blackpool Tower. Georgia May Foote and Giovanni Pernice finished at the top of the leaderboard after dancing an American Smooth to Whitney Houston's "I Have Nothing".
13	The Great British Bake Off	11.84	12 August	BBC One	The second episode of the sixth series that featured challenges on biscuits. Star baker from the first episode, Marie Campbell, crashed out of the competition following a disappointing performance in this episode while Ian Cumming won his 1st Star Baker Title.
14	Strictly Come Dancing	11.76	14 November	BBC One	The live show of the eighth week of the thirteenth series. Georgia May Foote and Giovanni Perice achieved the highest score of the series so far (39 points) after dancing a Charleston to "Hot Honey Rag" from Chicago.
15	The Great British Bake Off	11.73	5 August	BBC One	The premiere of the sixth series. This episode looked at judge Mary Berry's specialism, cakes, Marie Campbell was crowned the 1st Star Baker of the series & Stu Henshall was Eliminated.
16	Strictly Come Dancing	11.62	28 November	BBC One	The tenth week of the thirteenth series. It featured the show's first "Quickstep-a-thon", which was won by Helen George and Aljaz Skorjanec. She finished at the top of the leaderboard having scored 39 points for her Viennese Waltz to Etta James' "At Last".
17	EastEnders	11.60	19 February	BBC One	The second of two episodes broadcast this evening. This episode is set entirely on the night of Lucy Beale's murder. The murderer is revealed to be Lucy's brother, Bobby Beale (Eliot Carrington). In addition, it's revealed that Ronnie Mitchell (Samantha Womack) and Vincent Hubbard (Richard Blackwood) were in a secret relationship, and it was Vincent who gave her a gun.
18	New Year's Eve Fireworks	11.51	31 December	BBC One / BBC News	The television broadcast of the annual fireworks display in Westminster overlooking the River Thames.
19	Britain's Got Talent	11.44	25 April	ITV	The third episode of the ninth series, which featured singing-group Revelation Avenue, who were sent straight through to the semi-finals when judge Amanda Holden pressed the golden buzzer, and Hypnodog, which was supposedly a hypnotic dog.
20	Strictly Come Dancing	11.43	13 December	BBC One	The semi-final results show. It featured the final dance-off of the series, between Katie Derham and Anita Rani. Rani was eliminated following the judge's vote. By Derham winning the dance-off, it marked the first time her partner Anton du Beke reached the show's final, having competed in all thirteen series, but never successfully reaching the final. Kylie Minogue also performed.
21	EastEnders	11.36	19 February	BBC One	An hour-long special celebrating the show's 30th anniversary. It featured the wedding reception of Ian Beale and Jane Beale, Dot Branning being arrested for the death of her son Nick Cotton, Dean Wicks attempting to burn down The Queen Victoria Pub before Mick Carter pins him down on the floor unconscious, the birth of Kim Fox's daughter Pearl and the shock return of Kathy Beale, who was believed to be dead. The cliffhanger of the episode saw Ian accuse Jane of murdering Lucy Beale, demanding an explanation of what happened on the night of her murder (this led to the flashback episode later on in the evening).
22	The Great British Bake Off	11.35	23 September	BBC One	The quarter-final of the sixth series, looking at Pâtisserie, Nadiya Hussain won her 2nd Star Baker Title & fan favourite Paul Jagger was booted out of the competition.
23	Strictly Come Dancing	11.31	22 November	BBC One	The results show of the ninth week of thirteenth series. It featured the controversial dance-off between Jamelia and Peter Andre, where Andre went through. Anastacia and Take That also performed.
24	Britain's Got Talent	11.28	2 May	ITV	The fourth episode of the audition stage of the competition.
25	Call the Midwife	11.27	15 February	BBC One	The fifth episode of the fourth series, featuring the return of Nurse Cynthia Miller, now as Sister Mary Cynthia (Bryony Hannah).
26	Britain's Got Talent	11.19	9 May	ITV	The fifth episode of the audition stage which featured Entity Allstars (eventual finalists) who were sent straight to the semi-finals by judge Alesha Dixon who pressed her golden buzzer for them.
27	Strictly Come Dancing	11.10	6 December	BBC One	The results show of "Musicals Week". It featured the elimination of favourite Helen George, who up to this point had scored the most points with the judges. Josh Groban also performed.
28	Britain's Got Talent	11.09	16 May	ITV	The sixth episode of the audition stage which controversially featured Lorraine Bowen getting through to the semi-finals after judge David Walliams pressed his golden buzzer for her.
29	Call the Midwife	11.07	1 February	BBC One	The third episode of the fourth series, featuring guest star Richard Fleeshman in his first role on UK television since 2010.
30	Strictly Come Dancing	11.00	15 November	BBC One	The eighth week's result show, which featured the elimination of Jeremy Vine. Years & Years and Brandon Flowers also performed.
31	Call the Midwife	10.98	25 January	BBC One	The second episode of the fourth series, featuring the debut of new regular character, Phyllis Cane (Linda Bassett).
32	Strictly Come Dancing	10.97	12 December	BBC One	The semi-final live show. Kellie Bright topped the judge's leaderboard.
=33	EastEnders	10.96	20 February	BBC One	A 30-minute live episode which acted as the conclusion to the show's 30th anniversary celebrations and their Live Week. Jane Beale reveals to Ian Beale, Peter Beale and Cindy Williams that her adoptive son Bobby Beale killed Lucy Beale, as well as explaining that he doesn't know he killed her and that the family agrees to keep it a secret. It also features Linda Carter proposing to Mick Carter following her rape ordeal with Dean Wicks four months earlier.
=33	Strictly Come Dancing	10.96	17 October	BBC One	The live show of "Movie Week". Jay McGuinness achieved the first '10' of the series from judge Bruno Tonioli after dancing a Jive to "You Never Can Tell" and "Misirlou" from Pulp Fiction.
=33	I'm a Celebrity...Get Me Out of Here!	10.96	15 November	ITV	The premiere of the fifteenth series which saw the entrance of ten celebrities into the camp.
36	Strictly Come Dancing	10.95	29 November	BBC One	The results show of the tenth week. Peter Andre was eliminated after being up against Kellie Bright in the dance off.
37	Strictly Come Dancing	10.93	31 October	BBC One	The episode of the show's annual "Halloween Week". Georgia May Foote finished at the top of the judge's leaderboard following her Tango to "Ghostbusters".
38	Call the Midwife	10.92	8 February	BBC One	The fourth episode of the fourth series, featuring fan-favourite Trixie (Helen George) breaking off her engagement to Tom Hereward (Jack Ashton).
39	Strictly Come Dancing	10.91	8 November	BBC One	The results show from the seventh week, which saw Carol Kirkwood being eliminated after facing Kellie Bright in the dance-off. Seal also performed.
40	Britain's Got Talent	10.89 (Note: This is 7-day data as there is no 28-day data available.)	18 April	ITV	The second episode of the series, featuring eventual finalist Jamie Raven and hosts Ant & Dec's golden buzzer act, Boyband.
=41	Broadchurch	10.86	5 January	ITV	The debut of the second series of the drama, starring David Tennant and Olivia Colman. Features the debut of new cast members James D'Arcy, Eve Myles, Charlotte Rampling, Meera Syal and Academy Award nominated Marianne Jean-Baptiste, as well the revelation that Joe Miller (Matthew Gravelle) will plead not-guilty for Danny Latimer's murder, despite the previous series seeing him confess.
=41	Strictly Come Dancing	10.86	7 November	BBC One	The seventh week of the thirteenth series. Peter Andre finished at the top of the leaderboard following his Charleston to Basement Jaxx's "Do Your Thing".
43	Downton Abbey	10.78	25 December	ITV	The final ever episode of the multi award-winning show, tying up all of the drama's storylines. It centres around the engagement and wedding of Lady Edith Crawley (Laura Carmichael) and Herbert Pelham (Harry Hadden-Paton). On the wedding day, Anna Bates (Joanne Froggatt) goes into labour, giving birth to a son. Charles Carson (Jim Carter) accepts that his Parkinson's disease is preventing him from fulfilling his duty to the family, and so, upon Robert Crawley's (Hugh Bonneville) suggestion, takes a position that allows him to overlook the house and its running, whilst Thomas Barrow (Rob James-Collier) is made Butler. Isobel (Penelope Wilton) gets engaged to Lord Merton (Douglas Reith), Joseph Moseley (Kevin Doyle) and Phyllis Baxter (Raquel Cassidy) accept they are in love with each other and Cora (Elizabeth McGovern) and Violet (Maggie Smith) reconcile, with Violet accepting that Cora now has the prime position of the family. Furthermore, Lady Rose MacClare (Lily James) returns.
44	Britain's Got Talent	10.72	11 April	ITV	The premiere of the ninth series.
=45	Call the Midwife	10.64	8 March	BBC One	The final episode of the fourth series, the episode features Trixie (Helen George) admitting that she is an alcoholic, the return of Chummy (Miranda Hart) and the wedding of Fred Buckle (Cliff Parisi) and Violet Gee (Annabelle Apsion).
=45	I'm a Celebrity...Get Me Out of Here!	10.64	6 December	ITV	The final of the fifteenth series. After completing their last bush-tucker trials, Geordie Shore star Vicky Pattinson became Queen of the Jungle, beating Union J band member George Shelley and The Only Way is Essex star Ferne McCann to win.
47	Downton Abbey	10.63	8 November	ITV	The final episode of the sixth series. Thomas Barrow (Rob James-Collier attempts to commit suicide, but is saved. An angry and spiteful Mary (Michelle Dockery) reveals to Bertie that his fiancée, Lady Edith (Laura Carmichael), is the mother to Marigold, a little girl taken in by the family. Bertie leaves Edith, and Edith angrily berates her sister, with intent to finally rid her out of her life. Mary, after being persuaded by Violet (Maggie Smith), marries Henry Talbot (Matthew Goode).
=48	Call the Midwife	10.57	1 March	BBC One	Featuring guest star Una Stubbs, this episode features the first baby mix-up since the show's inception. It also features Fred Buckle (Cliff Parisi) proposing to Violet Gee (Annabelle Apsion).
=48	Doctor Foster	10.57	7 October	BBC One	The final episode of the first series. Gemma (Suranne Jones) reveals to Kate's (Jodie Comer) family that she has been having an affair with her husband, Simon (Bertie Carvel). When Simon refuses to leave the family home, Gemma seemingly appears to abduct her son and kill him. She does this to show Simon what the grief was like for her when she found out about the affair, and when it is revealed that her son is alive, but knows all the details about his affair, he hits her and bangs her head against a glass door. Simon later has a restraining order put against him seeing his wife, and attempts to continue his relationship with Kate.
50	Call the Midwife	10.55	18 January	BBC One	The first episode of the fourth series, which features the arrival of new character Barbara Gilbert (Charlotte Ritchie) and the temporary departure of Chummy Noakes (Miranda Hart).

== Debuts ==
=== BBC ===
Date	Debut	Channel
1 January	Roald Dahl's Esio Trot	BBC One
3 January	Frank Sinatra: Our Way	BBC One
5 January	Eve	CBBC
6 January	Six Puppies and Us	BBC Two
8 January	Crims	BBC Three
10 January	Now You See It	BBC One
20 January	Excluded: Kicked Out of School	BBC Three
21 January	Wolf Hall	BBC Two
22 January	Bangkok Airport	BBC Three
26 January	South Side Story	BBC Three
26 January	EastEnders: Back to Ours	BBC iPlayer
29 January	Eat Well for Less?	BBC One
2 February	The Great Antiques Map of Britain	BBC Two
2 February	A Cook Abroad	BBC Two
3 February	Inside The Commons	BBC Two
4 February	Alaska: Earth's Frozen Kingdom	BBC Two
9 February	Teacup Travels	CBeebies
9 February	Asylum	BBC Four
10 February	The Gift	BBC One
14 February	How We Got to Now	BBC Two
15 February	The Casual Vacancy	BBC One
15 February	I Survived a Zombie Apocalypse	BBC Three
22 February	The Big Painting Challenge	BBC One
22 February	Meet the Ukippers	BBC Two
23 February	The Twirlywoos	CBeebies
25 February	The People's Strictly for Comic Relief	BBC One
1 March	Pompidou	BBC Two
1 March	Let's Play Darts for Comic Relief	BBC Two
5 March	Banished	BBC Two
8 March	Poldark	BBC One
10 March	Nurse	BBC Two
11 March	In and Out of the Kitchen	BBC Four
16 March	The Edge	BBC One
16 March	Kew on a Plate	BBC Two
17 March	Back in Time for Dinner	BBC Two
17 March	Ordinary Lies	BBC One
18 March	Britain's Got the Builders In	BBC Two
18 March	The Billion Dollar Chicken Shop	BBC One
22 March	Caribbean with Simon Reeve	BBC Two
30 March	The Ark	BBC One
3 April	The Clare Balding Show	BBC Two
7 April	Victoria Derbyshire	BBC Two
10 April	Sex and the Church	BBC Two
12 April	Tatau	BBC Three
13 April	Jack Dee's Election Helpdesk	BBC Two
20 April	Decimate	BBC One
20 April	Alex Polizzi: Chefs on Trial	BBC Two
28 April	24 Hours in the Past	BBC One
29 April	Peter Kay's Car Share	BBC One
30 April	The Game	BBC Two
3 May	The C Word	BBC One
3 May	BBC Four Goes Slow	BBC Four
6 May	Murder in Successville	BBC Three
7 May	Shark	BBC One
11 May	Hetty Feather	CBBC
11 May	Beat the Brain	BBC Two
11 May	Great Chelsea Garden Challenge	BBC Two
15 May	Mary Berry's Absolute Favourites	BBC Two
17 May	Jonathan Strange & Mr Norrell	BBC One
17 May	The Detectives	BBC Two
21 May	So Awkward	CBBC
25 May	The Box	BBC One
27 May	SunTrap	BBC One
30 May	The John Bishop Show	BBC One
1 June	Nigel Slater: Eating Together	BBC One
8 June	Family Finders	BBC One
8 June	The Met: Policing London	BBC One
8 June	Japan: Earth's Enchanted Islands	BBC Two
10 June	The Interceptor	BBC One
8 June	Stonemouth	BBC Two
13 June	Prized Apart	BBC One
2 July	Britain Beneath Your Feet	BBC One
5 July	A Song for Jenny	BBC One
12 July	The Outcast	BBC One
13 July	Right on the Money: Live	BBC One
14 July	Hive Minds	BBC Four
15 July	Britain's Forgotten Slave Owners	BBC Two
19 July	The Javone Prince Show	BBC Two
20 July	Council House Crackdown	BBC One
20 July	The Housing Enforcers	BBC One
20 July	Britain at the Bookies	BBC One
25 July	5-Star Family Reunion	BBC One
26 July	Partners in Crime	BBC One
27 July	Life in Squares	BBC Two
30 July	Atlantic: The Wildest Ocean on Earth	BBC Two
3 August	The TV That Made Me	BBC One
7 August	Rick Stein: From Venice to Istanbul	BBC Two
11 August	The Totally Senseless Gameshow	BBC Three
16 August	Country Strife: Abz Love on the Farm	BBC Two
17 August	The Scandalous Lady W	BBC Two
19 August	Britain's Spending Secrets	BBC One
19 August	Top Coppers	BBC Three
20 August	Building the Ancient City	BBC Two
23 August	Big Blue Live	BBC One
25 August	Secrets of China	BBC Three
25 August	Fried	BBC Three
30 August	Special Forces: Ultimate Hell Week	BBC Two
31 August	Terry and Mason's Great Food Trip	BBC Two
31 August	This Wild Life	BBC Two
31 August	Danny and the Human Zoo	BBC One
31 August	Treasures of the Indus	BBC Four
1 September	Hairy Bikers' Northern Exposure	BBC Two
1 September	India: Nature's Wonderland	BBC Two
2 September	Kolkata with Sue Perkins	BBC One
2 September	The Ascent of Woman	BBC Two
3 September	Cradle to Grave	BBC Two
3 September	Boy Meets Girl	BBC Two
3 September	World's Weirdest Events	BBC Two
6 September	Lady Chatterley's Lover	BBC One
7 September	Money for Nothing	BBC One
7 September	Messy Goes to Okido	CBeebies
9 September	Doctor Foster	BBC One
13 September	An Inspector Calls	BBC One
14 September	All Change at Longleat	BBC One
14 September	Countdown to Life: The Extraordinary Making of You	BBC Two
14 September	Six Degrees of Separation	BBC Two
15 September	The Gamechangers	BBC Two
20 September	The Go-Between	BBC One
21 September	Best Bakes Ever	BBC Two
21 September	In Case You Missed It	BBC Two
22 September	The Naked Choir with Gareth Malone	BBC Two
25 September	Patagonia: Earth's Secret Paradise	BBC Two
27 September	Cider with Rosie	BBC One
28 September	Thief Trackers	BBC One
28 September	KKK: The Fight for White Supremacy	BBC Three
30 September	The Face of Britain with Simon Schama	BBC Two
30 September	Asian Provocateur	BBC Three
2 October	The Kennedys	BBC One
2 October	Music for Misfits: The Story of Indie	BBC Four
4 October	From Darkness	BBC One
5 October	The Celts: Blood, Iron and Sacrifice	BBC Two
6 October	Together	BBC Three
6 October	Close to the Edge	BBC Four
8 October	A Very British Romance	BBC Four
10 October	Ted Hughes: Stronger Than Death	BBC Two
11 October	Earth's Wildest Waters: The Big Fish UK	BBC Two
11 October	Britain's Ultimate Pilots: Inside the RAF	BBC Two
13 October	River	BBC One
19 October	The Fear	BBC Three
21 October	Scream Street	CBBC
22 October	The Last Kingdom	BBC Two
23 October	The Stuarts in Exile	BBC Four
26 October	My Life on a Plate	BBC One
27 October	Professor Green: Suicide and Me	BBC Three
28 October	Cuffs	BBC One
29 October	Out of Their League	BBC One
29 October	Rent a Cop	BBC Three
31 October	The Dresser	BBC Two
1 November	The Hunt	BBC One
2 November	Hugh's War on Waste	BBC One
2 November	Simply Nigella	BBC Two
3 November	The Great Pottery Throw Down	BBC Two
4 November	Dominic Sandbrook: Let Us Entertain You	BBC Two
4 November	Colour: The Spectrum of Science	BBC Four
9 November	The Wanted	BBC One
9 November	London Spy	BBC Two
11 November	Josh	BBC Three
15 November	The Secret History of the British Garden	BBC Two
16 November	The Dumping Ground Dish Up	CBBC
16 November	The Coroner	BBC One
16 November	Len and Ainsley's Big Food Adventure	BBC One
19 November	Doctor in the House	BBC One
22 November	Ireland with Simon Reeve	BBC Two
23 November	Tomorrow's Food	BBC One
23 November	Britain's Outlaws: Highwaymen, Pirates and Rogues	BBC Four
24 November	Capital	BBC One
24 November	The Truth About Child Sex Abuse	BBC Two
24 November	Power to the People	BBC Four
29 November	Jamillah & Aladdin	CBeebies
7 December	Sister Rita to the Rescue	BBC One
7 December	James Martin – Home Comforts at Christmas	BBC One
7 December	Reggie Yates' Extreme UK	BBC Three
8 December	Blood and Gold: The Making of Spain	BBC Four
11 December	Alex Polizzi: Hire Our Heroes	BBC Two
14 December	Back in Time for Christmas	BBC Two
21 December	Children Talking	BBC Four
22 December	Were Doomed! The Dad's Army Story	BBC Two
23 December	Snow Chick: A Penguin's Tale	BBC One
24 December	Professor Branestawn Returns	BBC One
24 December	The Great History Quiz: The Tudors	BBC Two
25 December	Stick Man	BBC One
25 December	Michael McIntyre's Big Show	BBC One
25 December	World's Sneakiest Animals	BBC Two
26 December	Shaun the Sheep: The Farmer's Llamas	BBC One
26 December	A Gert Lush Christmas	BBC Two
26 December	Dickensian	BBC One
26 December	And Then There Were None	BBC One
30 December	Great Barrier Reef	BBC One

=== ITV ===
Date	Debut	Channel
5 January	Fat Pets – Slimmer of the Year	ITV
5 January	Richard Wilson on the Road	ITV
6 January	The Wonder of Britain	ITV
6 January	Britain's Best Back Gardens	ITV
6 January	Blue Go Mad in Ibiza	ITV2
7 January	Chrisley Knows Best	ITVBe
8 January	The Kyle Files	ITV
8 January	Bring Back Borstal	ITV
12 January	Mel and Sue	ITV
12 January	The Real Housewives of Cheshire	ITVBe
13 January	Cockroaches	ITV2
17 January	Planet's Got Talent	ITV
18 January	Get Your Act Together	ITV
27 January	Bad Builders: Bang to Rights	ITV
5 February	The Keith Lemon Sketch Show	ITV2
5 February	Reality Bites	ITV2
8 February	The Ibiza Weekender	ITV2
11 February	The Big Fish Off	ITV4
13 February	Barging Round Britain with John Sergeant	ITV
20 February	Bear Grylls: Mission Survive	ITV
23 February	1000 Heartbeats	ITV
2 March	Arthur & George	ITV
14 March	You're Back in the Room	ITV
19 March	Double Decker Driving School	ITV
23 March	The Mafia with Trevor McDonald	ITV
30 March	O'Brien	ITV
4 April	Thunderbirds Are Go!	ITV
6 April	Code of a Killer	ITV
9 April	Ice Rink on the Estate	ITV
6 May	Slow Train Through Africa with Griff Rhys Jones	ITV
11 April	Ninja Warrior UK	ITV
11 April	Play to the Whistle	ITV
13 April	Wild Ireland	ITV
15 April	Give a Pet a Home	ITV
15 April	Newzoids	ITV
15 April	The Delivery Man	ITV
20 April	Safe House	ITV
3 May	Home Fires	ITV
15 May	Man & Beast with Martin Clunes	ITV
26 May	Game of Crowns	ITVBe
1 June	Johnny Kingdom's Wild Exmoor	ITV
4 June	Big Box, Little Box	ITV
4 June	Britain's Busiest Airport – Heathrow	ITV
7 June	Love Island	ITV2
10 June	Jordskott	ITV Encore
15 June	Jeremy Kyle's Emergency Room	ITV
15 June	It's a Funny Old Week	ITV
21 June	Black Work	ITV
25 June	Superhospital	ITV
6 July	Vet School	ITV
7 July	Virgin Atlantic: Up in the Air	ITV
12 July	Joanna Lumley's Trans-Siberian Adventure	ITV
13 July	Rookies	ITV
22 July	Life on Marbs	ITVBe
23 July	Real Stories with Ranvir Singh	ITV
23 July	Safeword	ITV2
23 July	The Wonder of Britain	ITV
27 July	Guess This House	ITV
27 July	Hello Campers	ITV
30 July	Flockstars	ITV
31 July	BBQ Champ	ITV
2 August	Nature Nuts with Julian Clary	ITV
3 August	Travel Guides	ITV
3 August	Freeze Out	ITV
15 August	The Saturday Night Story	ITV
17 August	Rebound	ITV
18 August	School Swap – The Class Divide	ITV
23 August	Animal Mums	ITV
27 August	Stephen Fry in Central America	ITV
30 August	The Trials of Jimmy Rose	ITV
31 August	Britain: As Seen on ITV	ITV
31 August	Dinosaur Britain	ITV
2 September	The Nick	ITV
9 September	ITV Changed My Life	ITV
9 September	My Life As A College Student	ITV
13 September	Horrible Science	CITV
15 September	Britain's Biggest Adventures with Bear Grylls	ITV
15 September	Parking Wars	ITV
22 September	Deals, Wheels and Steals	ITV
23 September	Midwinter of the Spirit	ITV
1 October	The Almost Impossible Gameshow	ITV2
6 October	Eternal Glory	ITV
6 October	Glitchy	ITV2
8 October	Unforgotten	ITV
14 October	Alexander Armstrong in the Land of the Midnight Sun	ITV
14 October	When Do You Get Off?	ITVBe
19 October	Pick Me!	ITV
25 October	Jekyll and Hyde	ITV
1 November	All About the Bants	ITV2
1 November	The Ty and Ky Show	ITV2
2 November	The Comedy Basement	ITV2
2 November	Pranksterz	ITV2
4 November	Joanna Lumley, Elvis and Me	ITV
11 November	The Frankenstein Chronicles	ITV Encore
7 December	Las Vegas with Trevor McDonald	ITV
10 December	Britain's Oldest Crooks	ITV
20 December	The Sound of Music Live	ITV
26 December	Peter & Wendy	ITV
27 December	Harry Price: Ghost Hunter	ITV

=== Channel 4 ===
Date	Debut	Channel
15 January	Cyberbully	Channel 4
19 January	Catastrophe	Channel 4
22 January	Cucumber	Channel 4
22 January	Banana	E4
22 January	Tofu	4oD
2 February	On the Piste	E4
2 February	Shipping Wars UK	Channel 4
9 February	Taking New York	E4
15 February	Indian Summers	Channel 4
16 February	UKIP: The First 100 Days	Channel 4
17 February	The Romanians Are Coming	Channel 4
24 February	Mary Portas: Secret Shopper	Channel 4
16 March	Raised by Wolves	Channel 4
24 March	Burger Bar to Gourmet Star	Channel 4
24 March	Teens	Channel 4
28 March	Coalition	Channel 4
21 April	Ballot Monkeys	Channel 4
5 May	No Offence	Channel 4
11 May	Damned Designs: Don't Demolish My Home	Channel 4
11 May	The Night Bus	Channel 4
14 May	Born Naughty?	Channel 4
1 June	Benchmark	Channel 4
11 June	The Tribe	Channel 4
14 June	Humans	Channel 4
23 June	Tattoo Fixers	E4
30 June	Not Safe for Work	Channel 4
8 July	The Autistic Gardener	Channel 4
9 July	Married at First Sight	Channel 4
22 July	Witnesses	Channel 4
13 August	Very British Problems	Channel 4
23 August	Time Crashers	Channel 4
25 August	Educating Cardiff	Channel 4
7 September	Jamie's Super Food	Channel 4
10 September	Hunted	Channel 4
13 September	This Is England '90	Channel 4
15 September	The Changing Room	Channel 4
17 September	Titchmarsh on Capability Brown	More4
26 September	Celebrity Benchmark	Channel 4
28 September	Sex Diaries	Channel 4
29 September	How to	E4
6 October	My Transgender Kid	Channel 4
6 October	Chewing Gum	E4
7 October	Million Pound Properties	Channel 4
8 October	Disappearing Britain	More4
14 October	Restoring Britain's Landmarks	Channel 4
19 October	SAS: Who Dares Wins	Channel 4
29 October	Kitchen Impossible	Channel 4
31 October	How to Be Queen: 63 Years and Counting	Channel 4
3 November	The Secret Life of	Channel 4
9 November	The Shopper's Guide to Saving Money	Channel 4
15 November	Chasing Perfection	Channel 4
19 November	Best Before: Music on 4	Channel 4
November	Grand Designs: RIBA House of the Year	Channel 4
30 November	The Murder Detectives	Channel 4
8 December	That's So Last Century	Channel 4
8 December	Tripped	E4
27 December	Walking the Himalayas	Channel 4

=== Channel 5 ===
Date	Debut	Channel
2 February	10,000 BC	Channel 5
13 May	Make You Laugh Out Loud	Channel 5
26 May	OAPs Behaving Badly	Channel 5
12 June	Conspiracy	Channel 5
24 June	Nightmare Tenants, Slum Landlords	Channel 5
7 July	Benefits by the Sea: Jaywick	Channel 5
23 July	Supersized	Channel 5
1 August	Tut	Channel 5
5 August	Undercover Benefits Cheat	Channel 5
8 August	Football League Tonight	Channel 5
21 August	In Therapy	Channel 5
3 September	The Special Needs Hotel	Channel 5
15 September	The Yorkshire Vet	Channel 5
26 September	Funniest Fails, Falls & Flops	Channel 5
26 September	Now That's Funny!	Channel 5
29 September	Body Donors	Channel 5
7 October	Britain's Flashiest Families	Channel 5
12 October	Wissper	Channel 5
21 October	Secrets of the Scammers	Channel 5
21 October	Gift of Life	Channel 5
27 October	Eamonn & Ruth: How the Other Half Lives	Channel 5
31 October	The Saturday Show	Channel 5
2 November	On Benefits: 26 Kids & Claiming	Channel 5
3 November	Pets Who Hate Vets	Channel 5
5 November	Shark Attack	Channel 5
24 November	Alex Polizzi's Italian Islands	Channel 5
8 December	Meet the Psychopaths	Channel 5

=== Other channels ===
Date	Debut	Channel
12 January	Drunk History	Comedy Central
20 January	Desi Rascals	Sky 1
29 January	Fortitude	Sky Atlantic
22 February	PREMature	Community Channel
23 February	I Live with Models	Comedy Central
24 February	Critical	Sky 1
15 March	Wild Things	Sky 1
3 April	Relatively Clever	Sky 1
29 April	Russell Howard's Stand Up Central	Comedy Central
3 May	The Enfield Haunting	Sky Living
21 May	X-Ray Mega Airport	Discovery Channel
2 June	Brotherhood	Comedy Central
3 June	Bob Monkhouse: The Million Joke Man	Gold
3 June	Judge Geordie	MTV
9 June	Guitar Star	Sky Arts
16 June	Undercover	Dave
18 June	Hoff the Record	Dave
22 June	First Class Chefs	Disney Channel
12 July	King of the Nerds	Sky 1
28 July	Taskmaster	Dave
6 August	If Katie Hopkins Ruled the World	TLC
7 September	We Bare Bears	Cartoon Network
15 September	One Hundred and Eighty	Sky 1
30 September	You, Me and the Apocalypse	Sky 1
11 October	Donal MacIntyre: Unsolved	CBS Reality
21 October	Bull	Gold
22 October	Bring the Noise	Sky 1
29 October	The Money Pit	Dave
2 November	After Hours	Sky 1
8 November	The Indestructables	Dave
12 November	The Last Panthers	Sky Atlantic
12 December	3G Boss	Channel S Television

== Channels ==
=== New channels ===
Date	Channel
5 January	TBN UK
28 February	Big Centre TV
15 April	Spike
26 May	Talking Pictures TV
1 August	BT Sport Europe
1 August	BT Sport Ultra HD
28 August	AMC
1 October	YourTV

=== Defunct channels ===
Date	Channel
9 June	Sky 3D
9 June	Sky Arts 2
1 October	Pop Girl
27 November	Bliss
31 December	Extreme Sports Channel

=== Rebranding channels ===
Date	Old Name	New Name
9 June	ESPN	BT Sport ESPN
9 June	ESPN HD	BT Sport ESPN HD
9 June	Sky Arts 1	Sky Arts
9 June	Sky Livingit	Real Lives

== Television shows ==
=== Changes of network affiliation ===
Show	Moved from	Moved to
Born to Kill	Channel 5	Really
Once Upon a Time	Channel 5	Netflix UK
Supernatural	Sky Living	E4
Nashville	More4	E4
Count Arthur Strong	BBC Two	BBC One
Don't Tell the Bride	BBC Three	BBC One
Bob the Builder	CBeebies	Channel 5
Danger Mouse	CITV	CBBC
Family Guy (First Run Rights)	BBC Three	BBC Two
Four Rooms	Channel 4	More4
Scrappers	BBC One	BBC Two
Live at the Apollo	BBC One	BBC Two
Waterloo Road	BBC One	BBC Three
Fifth Gear	Discovery Channel	History & ITV4
Mount Pleasant	Sky Living	Sky1
Collage and Service: Meets G & G1	ITV	Disney Channel

=== Returning this year after a break of one year or longer ===
Programme	Date(s) of original removal	Original channel(s)	Date of return	New channel(s)
The Sparticle Mystery	2013	CBBC	5 January 2015	N/A (Same channel as original)
Harry Hill's Stars in Their Eyes	23 December 2006	ITV	10 January 2015	N/A (Same channel as original)
Horrible Histories	2013	CBBC	7 February 2015	N/A (Same channel as original)
Mr. Bean: The Animated Series	2004	CITV	16 February 2015	N/A (Same channel as original)
Love Island	28 August 2006	ITV	7 June 2015	ITV2
TFI Friday	22 December 2000	Channel 4	12 June 2015	N/A (Same channel as original)
Clangers	1974	BBC One; Channel 4 Channel 5 – Milkshake!	15 June 2015	CBeebies
Ripper Street	2013	BBC One	31 July 2015	N/A (Same channel as original)
Bob the Builder	2011	CBeebies	1 September 2015	Channel 5 – Milkshake!
Danger Mouse	1992	CITV	28 September 2015	CBBC
Teletubbies	2002; 2009; 2012	BBC Two	9 November 2015	CBeebies

== Continuing television shows ==
=== 1920s ===
Programme	Date
BBC Wimbledon	(1927–1939, 1946–2019, 2021–present)

=== 1930s ===
Programme	Date
Trooping the Colour	1937–1939, 1946–2019, 2023–present
The Boat Race	(1938–1939, 1946–2019, 2021–present)

=== 1950s ===
Programme	Date
Panorama	(1953–present)
The Sky at Night	(1957–present)
Final Score	(1958–present)
Blue Peter	(1958–present)

=== 1960s ===
Programme	Date
Coronation Street	(1960–present)
Points of View	(1961–present)
Songs of Praise	(1961–present)
South Today	(1961–present)
University Challenge	(1962–1987, 1994–present)
Doctor Who	(1963–1989, 1996, 2005–present)
Horizon	(1964–present)
Match of the Day	(1964–present)
Top of the Pops	(1964–present, only at Christmas 2006–present)
Gardeners' World	(1968–present)
A Question of Sport	(1968, 1970–present)

=== 1970s ===
Programme	Date
Emmerdale	(1972–present)
Mastermind	(1972–1997, 2003–present)
Newsround	(1972–present)
Football Focus	(1974–present)
Arena	(1975–present)
One Man and His Dog	(1976–present)
Top Gear	(1977–2001, 2002–present)
Ski Sunday	(1978–present)
Antiques Roadshow	(1979–present)
Question Time	(1979–present)

=== 1980s ===
Programme	Date
Children in Need	(1980–present)
Countdown	(1982–present)
ITV Breakfast	(1983–present)
Good Morning Britain	(1983–1992, 2014–present)
Channel 4 Racing	(1984–2016)
Thomas & Friends	(1984–present)
EastEnders	(1985–present)
Comic Relief	(1985–present)
Casualty	(1986–present)
Fifteen to One	(1988–2003, 2013–present)
This Morning	(1988–present)
Countryfile	(1988–present)

=== 1990s ===
Programme	Date
Have I Got News for You	(1990–present)
MasterChef	(1990–2001, 2005–present)
ITV News Meridian	(1993–present)
Junior MasterChef	(1994–1999, 2010–present)
Room 101	(1994–2007, 2012–2018)
The National Lottery Draws	(1994–2017)
Top of the Pops 2	(1994–2017)
Hollyoaks	(1995–present)
Soccer AM	(1995–present)
Never Mind the Buzzcocks	(1996–2015)
Silent Witness	(1996–present)
Midsomer Murders	(1997–present)
Y Clwb Rygbi, Wales	(1997–present)
British Soap Awards	(1999–2019, 2022–present)
Holby City	(1999–2022)

=== 2000s ===
Programme	Date
2000
Big Brother	(2000–2010, 2011–present)
Bargain Hunt	(2000–present)
BBC Breakfast	(2000–present)
Click	(2000–present)
Doctors	(2000–present)
A Place in the Sun	(2000–present)
The Unforgettable	(2000–2002, 2010–present)
Unreported World	(2000–present)
2001
Celebrity Big Brother	(2001–2010, 2011–present)
BBC South East Today	(2001–present)
Rogue Traders	(2001–present)
2002
Escape to the Country	(2002–present)
Fifth Gear	(2002–present)
Flog It!	(2002–present)
Foyle's War	(2002–2015)
I'm a Celebrity...Get Me Out of Here!	(2002–present)
Ant & Dec's Saturday Night Takeaway	(2002–2009, 2013–present)
In It to Win It	(2002–present)
Inside Out	(2002–present)
Most Haunted	(2002–2010, 2014–present)
River City	(2002–2026)
Saturday Kitchen	(2002–present)
2003
Daily Politics	(2003–present)
QI	(2003–present)
This Week	(2003–present)
Celebrity Mastermind	(2003–present)
New Tricks	(2003–2015)
Eggheads	(2003–present)
Extraordinary People	(2003–present)
Grumpy Old Men	(2003–present)
Homes Under the Hammer	(2003–present)
Traffic Cops	(2003–present)
2004
Doc Martin	(2004–2019)
Match of the Day 2	(2004–present)
Strictly Come Dancing	(2004–present)
The X Factor	(2004–2018, 2021–present))
The Big Fat Quiz of the Year	(2004–present)
The Culture Show	(2004–present)
Football First	(2004–present)
The Gadget Show	(2004–present)
Live at the Apollo	(2004–present)
NewsWatch	(2004–present)
SadlerVision	(2004–present)
Strictly Come Dancing: It Takes Two	(2004–present)
Who Do You Think You Are?	(2004–present)
2005
8 out of 10 Cats	(2005–present)
Coach Trip	(2005–2006, 2009–2012, 2013–present)
Deal or No Deal	(2005–2016)
The Andrew Marr Show	(2005–present)
The Adventure Show	(2005–present)
The Apprentice	(2005–present)
Dragons' Den	(2005–present)
The Hotel Inspector	(2005–present)
The Jeremy Kyle Show	(2005–present)
Mock the Week	(2005–present)
Springwatch	(2005–present)
2006
Waterloo Road	(2006–2015)
The Album Chart Show	(2006–present)
Animal Spies!	(2006–present)
Lewis	(2006–2015)
The Apprentice: You're Fired!	(2006–present)
Banged Up Abroad	(2006–present)
Cricket AM	(2006–present)
Dickinson's Real Deal	(2006–present)
Don't Get Done, Get Dom	(2006–present)
Monkey Life	(2006–present)
Not Going Out	(2006–present)
The One Show	(2006–present)
People & Power	(2006–present)
Peschardt's People	(2006–present)
The Secret Millionaire	(2006–2008, 2010–present)
The Slammer	(2006–present)
2007
Britain's Got Talent	(2007–present)
Would I Lie to You?	(2007–present)
Benidorm	(2007–present)
The Big Questions	(2007–present)
Don't Tell the Bride	(2007–present)
The Graham Norton Show	(2007–present)
Harry & Paul	(2007–present)
Heir Hunters	(2007–present)
Helicopter Heroes	(2007–present)
Inspector George Gently	(2007–2017)
London Ink	(2007–present)
Real Rescues	(2007–present)
The Hot Desk	(2007–present)
2008
An Là	(2008–present)
Big & Small	(2008–present)
Celebrity Juice	(2008–present)
Chuggington	(2008–present)
Country House Rescue	(2008–present)
Only Connect	(2008–present)
Put Your Money Where Your Mouth Is	(2008–present)
Police Interceptors	(2008–present)
Rubbernecker	(2008–present)
Seachd Là	(2008–present)
Wallander	(2008–2016)
2009
Pointless	(2009–present)
Russell Howard's Good News	(2009–2015)
The Chase	(2009–present)
The Cube	(2009–2015)
Alan Carr: Chatty Man	(2009–2016)
Countrywise	(2009–present)
Cowboy Trap	(2009–present)
The Football League Show	(2009–2015)
Four Weddings	(2009–present)
Piers Morgan's Life Stories	(2009–present)
Rip Off Britain	(2009–present)

=== 2010s ===
Programme	Date
2010
DCI Banks	(2010–2016)
Dinner Date	(2010–present)
Downton Abbey	(2010–2015)
The Great British Bake Off	(2010–present)
Great British Railway Journeys	(2010–present)
A League of Their Own	(2010–present)
Little Crackers	(2010–present)
Lorraine	(2010–present)
Luther	(2010–present)
The Million Pound Drop	(2010–2015)
The Nightshift	(2010–present)
The Only Way Is Essex	(2010–present)
Sherlock	(2010–present)
Sunday Morning Live	(2010–present)
Take Me Out	(2010–2020)
2011
All Over the Place	(2011–present)
Black Mirror	(2011–present)
Episodes	(2011–2017)
Four Rooms	(2011–present)
Fresh Meat	(2011–2016)
Friday Download	(2011–present)
Hacker Time	(2011–2016)
Horrible Histories: Gory Games	(2011–2018)
Junior Bake Off	(2011–present)
Made in Chelsea	(2011–present)
Match of the Day Kickabout	(2011–present)
Perfection	(2011–2015)
Ross Kemp: Extreme World	(2011–2017)
Scott & Bailey	(2011–2016)
Sun, Sex and Suspicious Parents	(2011–present)
Text Santa	(2011–2015)
The Jonathan Ross Show	(2011–present)
Vera	(2011–2025)
2012
Endeavour	(2012–present)
Call the Midwife	(2012–present)
Moone Boy	(2012–2015)
Prisoners' Wives	(2012–present)
The Syndicate	(2012–present)
Stella	(2012–present)
Stand Up To Cancer	(2012–present)
The Voice UK	(2012–present)
Tipping Point	(2012–present)
Paul O'Grady: For the Love of Dogs	(2012–2023)
Last Tango in Halifax	(2012–present)
2013
The Dumping Ground	(2013–present)
Mr Selfridge	(2013–2016)
Blandings	(2013–2014)
Dani's Castle	(2013–2015)
Absolute Genius with Dick and Dom	(2013–2016)
Broadchurch	(2013–2017)
Bluestone 42	(2013–2015)
Up the Women	(2013–2015)
Caught Red Handed	(2013–present)
Shetland	(2013–present)
Vicious	(2013–2016)
The Great British Sewing Bee	(2013–present)
Count Arthur Strong	(2013–2017)
The Fall	(2013–2016)
My Mad Fat Diary	(2013–2015)
Big Star's Little Star	(2013–2018)
All at Sea	(2013–2015)
The Dog Rescuers	(2013–present)
Still Open All Hours	(2013–present)
Yonderland	(2013–2016)
2014
The Jump	(2014–present)
The Musketeers	(2014–2016)
Detectorists	(2014–2017)
Prey	(2014–2015)
The Great Interior Design Challenge	(2014–present)
Hair	(2014–2015)
Hank Zipzer	(2014–2016)
The Great British Bake Off: An Extra Slice	(2014–present)
Happy Valley	(2014–present)
Tyger Takes On...	(2014–present)
Educating Joey Essex	(2014–present)
In the Club	(2014–present)
Collage and Service: Meets G & G1	(2014–present)
Two Tribes	(2014–2015)
Weekend	(2014–2017)
Chasing Shadows	(2014–present)
Judge Rinder	(2014–present)
Grantchester	(2014–present)
Weekend Escapes with Warwick Davis	(2014–present)
The Big Allotment Challenge	(2014–present)
Benefits Street	(2014–present)
The Link	(2014–2015)
Paul O'Grady's Animal Orphans	(2014–2023)
W1A	(2014–2017)
House of Fools	(2014–2015)
Who's Doing the Dishes?	(2014–present)
24 Hours in Police Custody	(2014–present)
GPs: Behind Closed Doors	(2014–present)

== Ending this year ==
Date(s)	Programme	Channel(s)	Debut(s)
1 January	Miranda	BBC One	2009
2 January	Secret Dealers	ITV	2010
7 January	Sweat the Small Stuff	BBC Three	2013
15 January	Never Mind the Buzzcocks	BBC Two	1996
18 January	Foyle's War	ITV	2002
12 February	Crims	BBC Three	2015
14 February	Harry Hill's Stars in Their Eyes	ITV	1990 & 2015
17 February	The Big Allotment Challenge	BBC Two	2014
18 February	Alaska: Earth's Frozen Kingdom	BBC Two	2015
22 February	Mel and Sue	ITV	2015
22 February	Get Your Act Together	ITV	2015
25 February	Wolf Hall	BBC Two	2015
25 February	Up the Women	BBC Four & BBC Two	2013
1 March	The Casual Vacancy	BBC One	2015
2 March	South Side Story	BBC Three	2015
9 March	Waterloo Road	BBC One & BBC Three	2006
12 March	Cucumber	Channel 4	2015
12 March	Banana	E4	2015
12 March	Tofu	4oD	2015
12 March	Reality Bites	ITV2	2015
16 March	Arthur & George	ITV	2015
20 March	The Million Pound Drop	Channel 4	2010
25 March	In and Out of the Kitchen	BBC Four	2015
29 March	PREMature	Community Channel	2015
30 March	Perfection	BBC Two	2011
30 March	House of Fools	BBC Two	2014
30 March	I Survived a Zombie Apocalypse	BBC Three	2015
31 March	Nurse	BBC Two	2015
1 April	The Billion Dollar Chicken Shop	BBC One	2015
5 April	Pompidou	BBC Two	2015
6 April	Moone Boy	Sky 1	2012
6 April	Big Fat Gypsy Weddings	Channel 4	2010
10 April	O'Brien	ITV	2015
13 April	Bluestone 42	BBC Three	2013
13 April	Code of a Killer	ITV	2015
16 April	Banished	BBC Two	2015
24 April	Sex and the Church	BBC Two	2015
16 May	Atlantis	BBC One	2013
17 May	The Enfield Haunting	Sky Living	2015
17 May	Tatau	BBC Three	2015
19 May	Critical	Sky 1	2015
19 May	24 Hours in the Past	BBC One	2015
20 May	Give a Pet a Home	ITV	2015
21 May	Shark	BBC One	2015
25 May	The Football League Show	BBC One	2009
29 May	The Paul O'Grady Show	ITV	2004 & 2013
31 May	BBC News at Nine	BBC News Channel	2013
7 June	Celebrity Squares	ITV	1975, 1993 & 2014
14 June	All Star Family Fortunes	ITV	2006
15 June	Rastamouse	CBeebies	2011
18 June	X-Ray Mega Airport	Discovery Channel	2015
22 June	Beat the Brain	BBC Two	2015
22 June	Japan: Earth's Enchanted Islands	BBC Two	2015
26 June	The Box	BBC One	2015
28 June	Jonathan Strange & Mr Norrell	BBC One	2015
2 July	The Tribe	Channel 4	2015
1 July	SunTrap	BBC One	2015
5 July	Black Work	ITV	2015
6 July	My Mad Fat Diary	E4	2013
17 July	The Link	BBC One	2014
19 July	The Outcast	BBC One	2015
21 July	Undercover	Dave	2015
25 July	Prized Apart	BBC One	2015
29 July	The Interceptor	BBC One	2015
1 August	The Nightshift	STV Central/STV North	2010
2 August	Tut	Channel 5	2015
4 August	Hair	BBC Three/BBC Two	2014
4 August	Not Safe for Work	Channel 4	2015
5 August	Judge Geordie	MTV	2015
8 August	The Cube	ITV	2009
10 August	Life in Squares	BBC Two	2015
13 August	Atlantic: The Wildest Ocean on Earth	BBC Two	2015
14 August	Freeze Out	ITV	2015
28 August	BBQ Champ	ITV	2015
28 August	Guess This House	ITV	2015
30 August	King of the Nerds	Sky 1	2015
30 August	Partners in Crime	BBC One	2015
31 August	Two Tribes	BBC Two	2014
1 September	Dinosaur Britain	ITV	2015
4 September	Hello Campers	ITV	2015
8 September	India: Nature's Wonderland	BBC Two	2015
17 September	If Katie Hopkins Ruled the World	TLC	2015
17 September	Flockstars	ITV	2015
29 September	Fried	BBC Three	2015
30 September	Pound Shop Wars	BBC One	2012
1 October	Titchmarsh on Capability Brown	More4	2015
4 October	This Is England '90	Channel 4	2015
6 October	New Tricks	BBC One	2003
7 October	Midwinter of the Spirit	ITV	2015
7 October	Life on Marbs	ITVBe	2015
9 October	Patagonia: Earth's Secret Paradise	BBC Two	2015
13 October	Educating Cardiff	Channel 4	2015
23 October	Home Away from Home	BBC One	2014
25 October	From Darkness	BBC One	2015
27 October	The Naked Choir	BBC Two	2015
3 November	Experimental	Channel 4	2015
6 November	The Kennedys	BBC One	2015
10 November	The Job Lot	ITV/ITV2	2013
10 November	Lewis	ITV	2006
10 November	Together	BBC Three	2015
13 November	The Edge	BBC One	2015
17 November	River	BBC One	2015
18 November	Topsy and Tim	CBeebies	2013
20 November	Pick Me!	ITV	2015
22 November	Chasing Perfection	Channel 4	2015
13 October 1996; 29 November 2015	Grand Prix Highlights	BBC Three	2015
2 December	The Murder Detectives	Channel 4	
2 December	You, Me and the Apocalypse	Sky 1	
7 December	Rocket's Island	CBBC	2012
7 December	London Spy	BBC Two	2015
8 December	Capital	BBC One	2015
13 December	The Hunt	BBC One	2015
16 December	Cuffs	BBC One	2015
16 December	Peep Show	Channel 4	2003
17 December	All at Sea	CBBC	2013
17 December	Hunderby	Sky Atlantic	2012
17 December	The Last Panthers	Sky Atlantic	2015
17 December	Russell Howard's Good News	BBC Three/BBC Two	2009
18 December	Text Santa	ITV	2011
19 December	Keep It in the Family	ITV	2014
23 December	Prey	ITV	2014
25 December	Downton Abbey	ITV	2010
27 December	Surprise Surprise	ITV	1984 & 2012
27 December	Jekyll and Hyde	ITV	2015
28 December	And Then There Were None	BBC One	2015
31 December	Benchmark	Channel 4	2015
31 December	TFI Friday	Channel 4	1996 & 2015

== See also ==
- 2015 in British music
- 2015 in British radio
- 2015 in the United Kingdom
- List of British films of 2015
