= Close to the Edge (TV series) =

British television series

Close to the Edge is a British structured reality television show that started airing on BBC Four in September 2015. The show follows a group of pensioners from Bournemouth, with many scenes being improvised. It has drawn comparisons with Made in Chelsea and The Only Way is Essex, which follow a similar format.

== Cast ==
- Barbara 'Babs' Fowler
- Chris Dowding
- Vanessa Coleman
- John Seaton
- Dee Major
- Simon Cowen
- Jan Bishop
- Beate Braban
