= Jamie's Super Food =

British television series

Jamie's Super Food is a UK food lifestyle programme which was broadcast on Channel 4 in 2015.

== Episodes ==
Ep.num.	Overall	Title
1-01	1	Squash Daal with Fried Egg, and Griddled Steak
1-02	2	Pancakes, Tasty Fish Tacos and Chicken Cacciatore
1-03	3	Kebabs, Tofu Burger and Salad
1-04	4	Skinny Carbonara and Smoky Black Bean Stew
1-05	5	Baked Eggs and Sizzling Prawns
1-06	6	Health Bomb Breakfast and Chicken and Hummus
1-07	7	Pork and Apple and Asian Crispy Beef
1-Special	8	Pork and Apple and Asian Crispy Beef

Ep.num.	Overall	Title
2-01	9	Chicken Hot Pot with Korean kimchi
2-02	10	Doughnuts, Mussels and Meatballs
2-03	11	Avocado, Fajitas and Beef Stew
2-04	12	Balinese Curry and a Colourful Salad
2-05	13	Crumble, Ravioli and Tomato Sauce
2-06	14	Chocolate Porridge and Super Greens Cannelloni
2-07	15	Pancakes, Fish Fingers and Risotto
2-08	16	Magic Egg Breakfast and Smoky Veggie Chilli
