= The Totally Senseless Gameshow =

- Genre: Variety
- Written by: Seb Barwell; Jon Purkis; Lucien Young; Steve Parry
- Directed by: James Lord; Jeanette Goulbourn
- Presented by: Martin Dougan
- Country of origin: United Kingdom
- Original language: English

Production
- Executive producers: Ash Atalla; Neil Calow
- Producer: Gina Lyons
- Editor: Gareth Heal
- Running time: 25 minutes
- Production company: Roughcut Television

Original release
- Network: BBC Three

The Totally Senseless Gameshow is a one-off variety show that aired on 11 August 2015 for BBC Three. It was hosted by Martin Dougan. The gameshow elements were interspersed with 'backstage' inserts, humorously highlighting stereotypical treatment of the disabled.

In the gameshow itself, two mixed sex teams took part - Sugababe Amelle Berrebah teamed up with athlete Greg Rutherford, competing against the pairing of Casey Batchelor and Rick Edwards - with each round's premise being that the contestants were deprived of one sense (or had it artificially impaired):

1. Paraoke - identifying songs by lipreading their partner's 'karaoke' performance, whilst wearing noise-cancelling headphones
2. The Drunk Grand National - the contestants had to propel themselves (on board space hoppers 'dressed' as ponies) along a short course, whilst wearing vision-impairing goggles
3. Flick It, Sniff It, Lick It - one contestant from each team had to identify mystery objects (foodstuffs) without the aid of sight.

Although slated as a one-off programme, part of BBC Three's disability season, there seemed hope (expectation?) that it might return, as host Martin Dougan signed off by inviting viewers to return, "the next time we play The Totally Senseless Gameshow."
