= 2015 in Australian television =

This is a list of Australian television events and premieres that occurred in 2015, the 60th year of continuous operation of television in Australia.

== Events ==
=== January ===
Date	Event	Source
1	The ABC's coverage of Sydney New Year's Eve is widely panned for the second consecutive year, with criticism of technical issues, lame skits and awkward interviews. Ratings were however slightly higher than the previous year.	
4	The City of Sydney announces it will put its 2015–16 Sydney New Year's Eve fireworks coverage to tender, following the conclusion of ABC's two-year contract.	
9	OzTAM reveals final ratings data for the 2014 television year, which takes into account consolidated viewing figures. It shows Seven Network was the most watched network with 30.1% share, Channel Seven was most watched primary channel with 21.7% share and GO! the most watched multichannel with 4.7% share. The most watched program of 2014 was the 2014 AFL Grand Final at 2,828,000 metro viewers. The Nine Network won all three key demographics except 55+ which was won by Seven Network. The most watched non-sport program (and second overall) was the announcement of the winners of My Kitchen Rules with 2,712,000 viewers. The highest-rated multichannel program was day six of the 2014 Commonwealth Games with 582,000 viewers on One, and The Hunger Games movie was most watched non-sport program with 458,000 viewers on GO! The second round semi-final AFL match between Hawthorn Hawks and Port Adelaide was most watched program on subscription television with 479,000 viewers on Fox Footy, and sport made up the entire list of top-20 most watched programs on Foxtel.	
12	Channel Nine airs the global launch of the Fast4 Tennis format, broadcasting an exhibition match between Roger Federer and Lleyton Hewitt live from Sydney Entertainment Centre.	
15	Foxtel's movie streaming service Presto launches a television spin-off of its movie streaming service entitled Preto TV, as a joint venture with Seven West Media, the first of three major streaming companies launching in early 2015.	
16	SBS Director of TV and Online Tony Iffland quits the network, replaced by Marshall Heald.	
20	Sky News Australia rebrands its primary channel as "Sky News Live", dropping the "Sky News National" branding.	
26	Streaming service Stan, a joint venture between Fairfax Media and Nine Entertainment, officially launched.	
26	The twentieth anniversary of subscription television in Australia, following the launch of the Galaxy service on 26 January 1995.	
29	Channel Ten aired the 4th AACTA Awards.	
31	Channel Seven, Channel Nine and ABC Brisbane, as well as ABC News 24 and Sky News Australia nationally, broadcast coverage of the 2015 Queensland state election. Nine's coverage of 146,000 metro Brisbane viewers outrages other local coverage, with ABC News 24 outrating Sky News in national coverage.	

=== February ===
Date	Event	Source
1	Ten's Family Feud began airing on Sundays, bringing its run from five to six times weekly.	
2	Seven aired Super Bowl XLIX for the first time, as part of a five-year broadcast deal with the NFL, shared with ESPN. It would be watched by 354,000 viewers on Seven (up 144,000 viewers on the previous year broadcast on One), and another 94,000 on ESPN.	
8	The official 2015 OzTam television ratings period begins.	
8	In a rare programming move, Channel Seven will not air a traditional 6pm Seven News bulletin in capital cities, instead airing a documentary Inside the Siege: The Untold Story, featuring exclusive interviews with Melissa Doyle on the survivors of the 2014 Martin Place siege.	
9	From 9 February until 29 March, Fox Sports 3 features cricket programming exclusively, coordinating with the Australian hosted 2015 ICC Cricket World Cup.	
15	The second part of telemovie The House of Hancock goes to air with last minute edits and a disclaimer, following legal action from the series' subject Gina Rinehart, on the grounds of defamation.	
17	Russian based news channel RT (Russia Today) launches on the Foxtel platform on channel 658.	
17	Christian-based religious channel Daystar launches on the Foxtel platform on channel 193.	

=== March ===
Date	Event	Source
12	The subscription television industry's ASTRA Awards are held in Sydney, hosted by Giuliana Rancic. Sky News Australia wins the major award of 'channel of the year.'	
15	Horse racing subscription channel TVN closes, following a separation agreement between its NSW and Victorian shareholders	
15	Andrew Flintoff wins the inaugural series of I'm a Celebrity...Get Me Out of Here!.	
16	Millionaire Hot Seat gives away $540,000 to a contestant, a record for both the show and Australian afternoon game shows, eclipsing $535,500 given away by rival show Million Dollar Minute five months earlier.	
21	Sky Racing World will be replaced by Sky Thoroughbred Central, designed to cater to fans of thoroughbred racing following the earlier closure of TVN. Additionally, the channel will be moved to the basic tier of the Foxtel platform.	
22	Nominations for the 2015 Logie Awards are announced, with Andy Lee, Asher Keddie, Carrie Bickmore, Hamish Blake, Scott Cam and Stephen Peacocke all nominated for the Gold Logie. With 32 nominations, the ABC has the most of any network. Home & Away has the most nominations by a TV programme.	
23	Foxtel launches its next generation iQ3 set top box.	
24	American streaming service Netflix launches in Australia.	
27	Studio will be removed from the Foxtel platform, and its programming will continue solely on SBS One and SBS on Demand.	
27	Andrew Skarbek wins $1,016,000 on Million Dollar Minute, a record for an Australian afternoon game show (beating the previous record of Millionaire Hot Seat on 16 March), as well as the largest amount of money given away on Australian television (beating $1,000,000 prizes on Who Wants to Be a Millionaire?, Big Brother and The Big Adventure).	
28	Foxtel Arts will launch on the Foxtel platform, as a replacement for Studio	
28	A two-hour timeshift channel for Foxtel Movies Disney launches on the Foxtel platform on channel 415.	
28	Channels Seven, Nine and the ABC in Sydney, as well as ABC News 24 and Sky News Live nationally, will provide coverage of the 2015 NSW state election. ABC Sydney's coverage was most watched with 157,000 viewers while Sky's national coverage rated lowest with 49,000 viewers.	
29	A two-week Easter break in OzTam television ratings begins.	
29	The final of the 2015 ICC Cricket World Cup becomes the most watched event of the year to date, with an average estimated 3.81 million national viewers watching the event between both Channel Nine and Fox Sports.	
31	The Seven Network renews its exclusive broadcast rights to the Sydney to Hobart Yacht Race until 2021.	

=== April ===
Date	Event	Source
10	The ABC's Australia Plus portal becomes the first mainstream western media outlet with a registered portal in China.	
12	Official OzTam ratings resume after a two-week non-ratings period over Easter.	
12	It is revealed Prime Minister Tony Abbott will meet in private with the CEOs of Seven, Nine and Ten during the week ahead to discuss possible media reform, which could result in mergers between companies.	
12	Fiona Falkiner will replace Hayley Lewis on this year's season of The Biggest Loser. Falkiner was previously a contestant on the program's first season.	
25	Ronan Keating reveals he will not return to The X Factor panel this year. Sister of pop superstar Kylie, Dannii Minogue confirms her return.	
26	The World Game reporter Scott McIntyre is sacked by broadcaster SBS over inappropriate anti-Anzac tweets	
29	Dee and Darren Jolly win The Block taking home A$935,000 following the auction, the highest win in the shows' history. Collectively, the four couples took home $3,165,000 making it the most money given away in a single episode by any television program worldwide.	
29	NITV make a formal complaint against ACT Police claiming one of its journalists was intimidated while filming a protest march in Canberra.	
30	Ten Network Holdings posts a net loss of A$264.4 million for the six months to March 2015.	

=== May ===
Date	Event	Source
3	The Project co-host Carrie Bickmore wins the Gold Logie at the 57th TV Week Logie Awards.	
3	It is announced that singers James Blunt and Chris Isaak will join returning judge Guy Sebastian and existing judge Dannii Minogue as judges on the upcoming season of The X Factor.	
4	Steve Flood and Will Stewart win the sixth season of My Kitchen Rules, becoming the first all male team to do so in the series' history.	
6	Residents from the Sydney suburb of Mount Druitt and the Mayor of Blacktown Stephen Bali lead a call for SBS ONE to dump its three part series Struggle Street, labelling it "poverty porn" and saying the series unfairly portrayed participants in the docu-series and stereotyping locals. Blacktown Council stages a protest using garbage trucks outside SBS offices in Artarmon. The series goes to air as planned, winning its timeslot nationally and is the most watched program on television that night in Sydney, with the controversy claimed for the record ratings.	
6	Daniel McPherson announces he will quit as host of Dancing with the Stars to focus on his acting career.	
7	Tracy Grimshaw, the host of the Nine Network's flagship current affairs programme A Current Affair is taken to hospital after she fell off a horse in Sydney.	
8	SBS sacks journalist Marion Ives over a post on Facebook.	
12	The Labor Party announces it will block proposed laws which would allow the partially Government funded SBS to run more adverts during primetime.	
12	The Government cuts AU$1 million in funding to Screen Australia, who in turn warn it may result in reduced funding of Australian produced television programs.	
13	SBS quits the Freeview group.	
20	SBS will broadcast the 2015 Eurovision Song Contest semi-finals and finals live for the first time in Australia, with Australia competing and voting for the first time in the annual event.	
22	WIN Television closes regional newsrooms in both Mildura and Mackay without warning, citing commercial viability.	
23	The Morning Show regular and radio presenter Glenn Wheeler speaks for the first time since awaking from a coma following a motorcycle accident in January.	
27	Sunrise co-host David Koch quits as chairman of the Organ and Tissue Authority after a Today Tonight story questioned the group's spending of public money, and additionally lashes out at Assistant Health Minister Fiona Nash for launching an inquiry after being lobbied by a third party lobby group.	
27	Both ABC and SBS managing directors Mark Scott and Michael Ebeid face a Senate estimates hearing. Among the topics discussed with Scott were aggressive interviewing during the 2015 Australian federal budget, whether Q&A is biased towards leftist politics and his own future at the ABC. Ebeid was asked about controversial series Struggle Street, the cost of Australia's participation in the 2015 Eurovision Song Contest, how American sitcoms such as 30 Rock comply with the SBS charter and SBS refusing to air an anti same-sex marriage ad during its coverage of the Sydney Gay and Lesbian Mardi Gras.	

=== June ===
Date	Event	Source
5	The Australian Communications & Media Authority reports the ABC and four subscription services failed to meet captioning targets in 2014.	
8	Shane Bourne is announced the new co-host of Dancing with the Stars, while Adam Garcia will not return as a judge.	
11	A2 Milk Company begins legal proceedings against ABC program The Checkout, accusing the program of deceptive and misleading conduct, which the ABC will defend.	
11	The X Factor host Luke Jacobz apologies to a court via a lawyer after he was charged with drink driving on 31 May in Sydney.	
11	A screaming Ben Ross breaks his arm during an arm-wrestling stunt live with Wendell Sailor on The Footy Show (NRL)	
15	Foxtel announces it will purchase a 15% stake of Ten Network Holdings for AU$77 million. The deal also sees Ten take a 24.99% stake in Multi Channel Network (MCN) and the option to take a 10% stake in Presto within two years.	
16	No Victorian horse races will be broadcast on television due to the Racing Victoria failing to get all Melbourne clubs support for a new broadcast deal with the Seven Network at the same time a deal with existing broadcaster Sky Racing expired.	
16	Seven News and Sunday Night presenter Chris Bath quits the network after twenty years, reportedly over a pay dispute.	
19	Seven News Sydney presenter Mark Ferguson renews his contract with the Seven Network with a record AU$1.75 million a year for the next five years. They have also signed Ferguson to host the advertisements for the network's Sydney News Bulletin.	
22	Racing Victoria gets all its members to agree to a new broadcast deal, which allows all Victorian horse racing events to be broadcast after a one-week absence. Races will be broadcast on a new Seven West Media owned digital channel which will officially launch in August.	
22	Jess and Ayden Hogan win the inaugural season of Reno Rumble.	
22	The ABC is widely criticised for allowing convicted criminal Zaky Mallah to ask a question of the panel on Q&A. During the live program, Mallah suggests the actions of the Australian Government meant Muslims were justified in joining terrorist group Islamic State. The Government launches an inquiry into the ABC's handling of the incident and security procedures at the broadcater's Ultimo studios.	
24	The Australian Senate votes against a proposed amendment allowing SBS to increase primetime advertising.	
30	A Perth court hears a drugs charge against reality star Brynne Edelsten.	

=== July ===
Date	Event	Source
4	SBS ONE will rebrand, which will involve reverting to its original name of SBS.	
4	The Seven Network's Martin Place newsroom is evacuated following an electrical fault. The network's Sydney news bulletin fails to get to air, with the Melbourne bulletin airing for 30 minutes in Sydney followed by an episode of Border Security: International.	
6	Prime Minister Tony Abbott demands his frontbench ministry boycott Q&A following Zaky Mallah's controversial appearance on the program two weeks prior.	
6	Sky News Business announces it will rebrand as Sky News Money during primetime and overnight on weekdays.	
13	It is revealed the Federal Government will launch a review into the Australian Communications & Media Authority.	
15	The X Factor host Luke Jacobz loses his licence for 12 months and is fined AU$700 after pleading guilty to drink driving	
20	The Australian Government announces it will review local content laws, following complaints by the Australian production industry that networks are using New Zealand content to fulfill local content quotas, which count as Australian productions under the Australia-NZ Economic Trade Agreement.	
20	Steve and Tiana Falzon are declared winners of the third season of House Rules.	
24	The ABC announces it will be phasing out its retail stores.	
25	Chris Bath leaves both Seven News and Sunday Night after 20 years with the news division of the Seven Network.	
27	Billie McKay wins the seventh season of MasterChef Australia.	

=== August ===
Date	Event	Source
2	The Seven Network launches court action against the Nine Network, claiming the latter's new reality cooking series The Hotplate has infringed the copyright of Seven's My Kitchen Rules.	
6	A judges dismisses the Seven Network's legal action against The Hotplate.	
7	Prime Minister Tony Abbott lifts a ban on his MPs appearing on the ABC's Q&A program.	
10	The Nine Network, Foxtel and Telstra sign a new NRL broadcasting deal, worth AU$185 million per year for the 2018–2022 seasons.	
17	Television personality Sophie Monk is allegedly groped by a member of the public while filming a challenge for the fourth season of The Celebrity Apprentice Australia.	
18	The Seven Network, Foxtel and Telstra announce a new AFL broadcasting deal, totalling AU$2.508 billion (or $418 million per year) for the 2017–2022 seasons.	
18	Nine Entertainment confirms the sale of its Willoughby studios for $147.5 million	
25	The ABC apologies to Prime Minister Tony Abbott for letting a tweet with the username @AbbottLovesAnal appear on screen during Q&A.	
27	The Australian Communications & Media Authority clears Leigh Sales of bias during a 7.30 interview with Joe Hockey in May.	
29	Seven West Media will officially launch its horse racing digital channel, Racing.com, on channel 78	
30	Ellie Drennan is announced as the winner of the fourth season of The Voice.	

=== September ===
Date	Event	Source
2	Channel Seven announces it has acquired the broadcast rights for the first 7 seasons of The Big Bang Theory, after a deal with distributor Warner Bros starting in October. The Nine Network previously had full rights.	
2	Personalities and staff from Seven, Nine, TEN, ABC, 2UE, 2GB, Fairfax and News Corp gather for a benefit to support The Morning Show regular Glenn Wheeler, who is recovering from an accident earlier in the year.	
3	British pop star Ed Sheeran will appear in an episode of Home & Away	
3	Fox Sports and Foxtel announce a new NBL broadcasting deal, for the next 5 years between 2015/16-2019/20 seasons.	
7	Emma Freedman wins the fifteenth season of Dancing with the Stars.	
8	Anirudh wins the inaugural season of The Great Australian Spelling Bee.	
9	The Australian Communications & Media Authority finds the Nine Network's A Current Affair breached codes of practice on a story about religion in schools.	
10	The Donehue family win the inaugural (and most likely the only) season of Restaurant Revolution.	
21	Mitch Fifield replaces Malcolm Turnbull as the Minister for Communications.	
22	Details of the contract between the Seven Network and Australian Border Force over the access and production of Border Security: Australia's Front Line are revealed.	
23	The Seven Network obtains the rights to Swimming Australia events through to 2025.	

=== October ===
Date	Event	Source
2	Water floods the Seven News studios in Melbourne, forcing the live bulletin to film in another part of the building.	
4	The Nine Network stands down its NRL football commentator Andrew Johns following an "alleged intoxication incident".	
17	Dirty Laundry Live host Lawrence Mooney is banned from driving for a year after high range speeding offences.	
20	Bruce Gordon's WIN Television buys 13% of Nine Entertainment, giving him nearly 15% total ownership of the Nine Network's parent company.	
22	The Australian Competition & Consumer Commission approves Foxtel's 15% acquisition of Network Ten.	
22	Sasha is chosen by Sam Frost as winner of the inaugural season of The Bachelorette.	
22	Network Ten gets an injunction against the Daily Mail Australia after the latter publishes photos looking through a hotel window of the final couple of The Bachelorette before the show's finale aired.	
30	The Seven Network is found to have breached the code of practice by airing promos for an M-classified program in a G-classified timeslot.	

=== November ===
Date	Event	Source
1	The Bio. channel will cease broadcast	
3	Channel Seven, 7two and 7mate officially launch a live stream online, geo-located to local markets, although channel streaming is available in the week before the official launch.	
10	The Block contestant Suzi Taylor is taken to hospital following being found unconscious on the set of the program. She was released the same day suffering exhaustion.	
17	SBS launches the Food Network.	
17	SBS holds its upfronts event in Sydney, announcing 2016 programming.	
19	Network Ten will hold its annual upfronts event, highlighting their 2016 programming.	
26	Nine Network launches 9Life, and revives its HD channel 9HD. GEM moves to SD.	
28	The last day of the official 2015 OzTam television ratings period.	
29	9Life and Food Network will begin to be measured by OzTAM ratings.	

=== December ===
Date	Event	Source
1	Changes by the Australian Communications & Media Authority to the commercial television code of practice come into effect, with sweeping changes including allowing M and MA15+ rated programs to air an hour earlier from 7:30 pm and 8:30 pm respectively, PG rated programs to air all day, dumping the AV15+ rating as well as changes to alcohol and gambling advertising.	
14	Sam Wood and Snezana Markoski announce their engagement, months after the third season of The Bachelor ended.	
15	In the Mid-Year Economic Fiscal Outlook (MYEFO) released by the Federal Government, Screen Australia cops a $10.3 million cut, the third cut in under two years. Additionally, SBS gains $4.1 million.	
16	Sian Redgrave wins the second season of The Great Australian Bake Off	

== Channels ==
=== Channel launches ===
- 1 February – Food Network, HGTV, Travel Channel (Fetch TV only)
- 28 March – Foxtel Arts, Foxtel Movies Disney+2
- 28 August – Racing.com (Free-To-Air)
- 17 November – Food Network Australia
- 26 November – 9Life, 9HD

=== Closed channels ===
- 15 March – TVN
- 28 March – STUDIO (replaced by Foxtel Arts)
- 31 October – Bio.
- 26 November – eXtra^{2} (replaced by 9Life)
- 20 December – TVS

=== Renamed channels ===
- 2 March – ABC Kids (was ABC4 Kids, but shared with ABC2)
- 1 August – 111 (was 111 Greats)
- 26 November – 9Go! (was GO! channel)
- 26 November – 9Gem (was GEM Channel)

== Deaths ==
Name	Date	Age	Broadcast notability	References
Rod Taylor	8 January	aged 84	Actor who starred in the American TV series Hong Kong, Bearcats!, and The Oregon Trail	
Sarah Kemp	9 January	aged 77	Actress best known for her role in soap opera Sons and Daughters as Charlie Bartlett.	
James Walker	24 January	aged 41	Screenwriter for numerous dramas including McLeod's Daughters, Home & Away and Neighbours.	
Norman Yemm	5 February	aged 82	Theatre and television actor and sportsman<known for Number 96 as Harry Collins	
Terry Gill	25 February	aged 75	British born Australian actor, star of Crocodile Dundee and soap opera The Flying Doctors, also portrayed Santa Claus at the annual TV broadcast of Carols by Candlelight	
Stuart Wagstaff AM)	10 March	aged 90,	Theatre and television personality and entertainer, born in England	
Michael Laurence	23 March	aged 79	Television producer and scriptwriter, best known for television movie and serial Return to Eden	
Richie Benaud	10 April	aged 84	Wide World of Sports cricket commentator for the Nine Network.	
Betty Lucas	27 April	aged 90,	Australian theatre and television soap actress known for Prisoner, Taurus Rising and Richmond Hill.	
Bob Hornery	26 May	aged 83	Actor from Neighbours who played Tom Kennedy	
John Pinder	256 May	aged 70,	Comedy producer, theatre producer/director and talent manager co-founder of the Melbourne International Comedy Festival and Circus Oz	
Alan Bond	5 June	aged 77,	English Australian businessman who previously owned the Nine Network	
Yoram Gross	23 September	aged 88	Polish Australian film producer, animation director and film studio owner, creator of the film adaptations of Blinky Bill, including Blinky Bill: The Mischievous Koala and Dot and the Kangaroo and its numerous sequels	
Mike Gibson	23 September	aged 75	Australian television sports journalist and commentator, known for Nine's Wide World of Sports and Fox program The Back Page	13
Sir James Cruthers	13 October	aged 90,	journalist, media pioneer and philanthropist	
Harry Butler AO, OBE	23 December	aged 85	Environment conservationist, TV presenter In the Wild and Australian of the Year 1979	
Carol Burns	21 December	aged 68	Actress and Queensland Theatre Company, best known for Ten Network series Prisoner as Freida "Franky" Doyle	

== Ratings ==
For the 2015 calendar year, the Seven Network had the highest consolidated metro ratings share with 29% of the audience. Channel Seven was the most watched primary channel (20.4% share) and 7Two was the most watched multichannel (4.7% share). Of the twenty most watched programs, 13 programs were sports coverage, including the most watched program being the 2015 AFL Grand Final with 2.64 million viewers. The highest rated non-sport program was the announcement of the seventh season winner of MasterChef Australia with 2.2 million viewers.

On subscription television, all but one of the top twenty most watched titles was sport, including the 2015 Cricket World Cup Final on Fox Sports 3, which topped the list with 616,000 viewers. The only non-sport program making the list was Game of Thrones which averaged 356,000 across its season.

== Premieres ==
=== Domestic series ===
List of domestic television series premieres
Program	Original airdate	Network	Source
The Great Australian Race Riot	4 January	SBS	
Prison Songs	4 January	SBS	
Story Club	7 January	ABC2	
Black Tuesday: Rising From The Ashes	11 January	Nine Adelaide	
Jay's Jungle	12 January	7TWO	
Healthy Homes	24 January	Network Ten	
Hinch Live	1 February^{[h]}	Sky News Australia	
I'm a Celebrity...Get Me Out of Here!	1 February	Network Ten	
Jillaroo School	1 February^{[c]}	ABC	
Winter	4 February	Seven Network	
Hiding	5 February	ABC	
Before and After	6 February	7TWO	
Shark Tank	8 February	Network Ten	
Gallipoli	9 February	Nine Network	
Gogglebox Australia	11 February	The LifeStyle Channel^{[f]}	
Judith Lucy is All Woman	11 February	ABC	
Outback ER	12 February	ABC	
Express Yourself with Sean Choolburra and Friends	13 February	NITV	
Australia: The Story of Us	15 February	Seven Network	
Maximum Choppage	24 February	ABC2	
SA's Most Wanted	5 March	Nine Adelaide	
Bubble Bath Bay	9 March	ABC 4 Kids	
Tattoo Tales	1 April	ABC2	
The Friday Show	10 April	Sky News Live	
Deadline Gallipoli	19 April	showcase	
The Weekly with Charlie Pickering	22 April	ABC	
8MMM Aboriginal Radio	29 April	ABC2	
My Ireland with Colin	29 April	Seven Network	
Struggle Street	6 May	SBS	
Luke Nguyen's United Kingdom	14 May	SBS	
Married at First Sight Australia	18 May	Nine Network	
Emma!	1 June	ABC2	
Emma!	1 June	Seven Network	
PVO NewsDay	1 June	Sky News Australia	
To The Point	1 June	Sky News Australia	
Changing Faces	2 July	Style Network	
The Lucky Country	4 July	Seven Network	
Glitch	9 July	ABC	
Room 101	11 July^{[i]}	SBS	
Dr. Lisa to the Rescue	18 July	Nine Network	
Little Lunch	20 July	ABC3	
Pawn Stars Australia	21 July	A&E Australia	
Far Flung with Gary Mehigan	25 July	Network Ten	
Restaurant Revolution	28 July	Seven Network	
The Hotplate	28 July	Nine Network	
The Great Australian Spelling Bee	3 August	Network Ten	
Saltwater Heroes	5 August	Discovery Channel	
Restoration Australia	1 September	ABC	
Event	6 September	Foxtel Arts	
The Chase Australia	14 September	Seven Network	
What Really Happens in Thailand	14 September	Seven Network	
800 Words	15 September	Seven Network	
The Bachelorette Australia	23 September	Network Ten	
My Life in 50 Words or Less	5 October	ABC3	
Snake Boss	5 October	Animal Planet	
The Principal	7 October	SBS	
The Verdict	8 October	Nine Network	
Beach Cops	11 October	Seven Network	
The Ex-PM	14 October	ABC	
Mesmerised	15 October	Seven Network	
The Hype	17 October	E!	
The Beautiful Lie	18 October	ABC	
Sammy J & Randy in Ricketts Lane	18 October	ABC	
Let's Talk About	30 October	Presto	
Aussie BBQ Heroes	18 November	Seven Network	
Baby Circle	Scheduled for 2015 but did not air	Network Ten	
Batavia	TBA^{[a]}	Network Ten	
Family Law	TBA^{[b]}	SBS	
The First ANZACs	TBA	Network Ten	
Gold Coast Medical	Scheduled for 2015 but did not air	Seven Network	
Maddie Parry: Tough Jobs	TBA	ABC2	
Tashi	TBA	ABC3	

=== International series ===
List of international television series premieres
Program	Original airdate	Network	Country of origin	Source
Euros of Hollywood	1 January	Arena	United States	
The Great Garden Revival	3 January	The LifeStyle Channel	United Kingdom	
Manufactured	4 January	Discovery Science	United States	
Playhouse Presents	4 January	BBC First	United Kingdom	
Chozen	5 January	The Comedy Channel	United States	
Inside Number 9	5 January	BBC First	United Kingdom	
Inspector Gadget	5 January	Boomerang	Canada	
You, Me & Them	6 January	BBC First	United Kingdom	
Bandit Patrol	6 January	Nat Geo Wild	United States	
AmeriCarna	7 January	Discovery Turbo	United States	
Dark Horse Nation	7 January	A&E	United States	
Edge of Alaska	7 January	Discovery Channel	United States	
Human Universe with Brian Cox	7 January	ABC	United Kingdom	
LeAnn & Eddie	7 January	Arena	United States	
Step Dave	7 January	GEM	New Zealand	
Thrift Hunters	7 January	A&E	United States	
Health Freaks	8 January	LifeStyle You	United Kingdom	
Plebs	8 January	ABC2	United Kingdom	
The Art Of...	8 January	Bio.	United States	
Mary Berry Cooks	9 January	Lifestyle Food	United Kingdom	
BBQ Crawl	10 January	A&E	United States	
Eat: The Story of Food	10 January	Nat Geo People	United States	
Man Down	12 January	SBS	United Kingdom	
Uncle	12 January	SBS	United Kingdom	
Siblings	13 January	ABC2	United Kingdom	
Supercar Superbuild	16 January	Discovery Turbo	United States	
50 Ways to Kill Your Lover	17 January	CI Network	United States	
Max & Shred	17 January	Nickelodeon	United States; Canada	
The Nightly Show with Larry Wilmore	20 January	The Comedy Channel	United States	
Tiny House Nation	20 January	LifeStyle Home	United States	
Nigel & Adam's Farm Kitchen	21 January	LifeStyle Food		
Rattlesnake Republic	21 January	Animal Planet	United States	
Henry Danger	24 January	Nickelodeon	United States	
Mozart in the Jungle	26 January	Stan	United States	
Christina Milian Turned Up	27 January	E!	United States	
Cordon	27 January	SBS 2	Belgium	
Transparent	27 January	Nine Network^{[g]}	United States	
Railroad Alaska	28 January	Discovery Channel	United States	
Great Night Out	29 January	BBC First	United Kingdom	
Wild But True	30 January	Discovery Kids	United States	
Cristela	1 February	FOX8	United States	
Celebrity Legacies	2 February	Bio.	United States	
Monsters Inside Me	2 February	Animal Planet	United States	
Mud, Sweat & Gears	2 February	BBC Knowledge	United States	
We're Talking Animals	2 February	Discovery Kids		
Tom Kerridge's Best Ever Dishes	3 February	LifeStyle Food	United Kingdom	
Alaska Off-Road Warriors	4 February	A&E	United States	
Totally Rubbish	5 February	Discovery Kids	United States	
Cry Wolfe	6 February	Discovery Channel	United States	
Saving Hope	6 February	SoHo	United States	
The House That £100k Built	6 February	7TWO	United Kingdom	
World's Best Chefs	7 February	Nat Geo People		
Better Call Saul	9 February	Stan	United States	
Handsome Devils	10 February	CI Network	United States	
How to Get Away with Murder	10 February	Seven Network	United States	
Tattoos After Dark	10 February	Eleven	United States	
The Affair	10 February	showcase	United States	
Forever	11 February	Nine Network	United States	
Strictly Soulmates	14 February	LifeStyle You	United Kingdom	
Fortitude	15 February	ABC	United Kingdom	
Your Home in Their Hands	15 February	LifeStyle Home	United Kingdom	
Dates	16 February	BBC First	United Kingdom	
Foo Fighters: Sonic Highways	16 February	Channel [V]	United States	
Mammon	17 February	SBS	Norway	
The Moaning of Life	17 February	BBC Knowledge	United Kingdom	
Siba's Table	18 February	LifeStyle Food		
Big Dreams, Small Spaces	19 February	The LifeStyle Channel	United Kingdom	
State of Affairs	19 February	Seven Network	United States	
Can't Get The Staff	20 February	The LifeStyle Channel	United Kingdom	
Transformers: Robots in Disguise	21 February	Cartoon Network	United States	
Richard Hammond's Wild Weather	23 February	SBS	United Kingdom	
How We Got to Now	26 February	ABC	United Kingdom	
Grantchester	28 February	ABC	United Kingdom	
Empire	1 March^{[j]}	Network Ten	United States	
Witnesses	4 March	SBS	France	
K.C. Undercover	5 March	Disney Channel	United States	
Dig	6 March	Stan	United States	
Blaze and the Monster Machines	9 March	Nick Jr.	United States	
The Game	23 March	BBC First	United Kingdom	
The Odd Couple	23 March	Network Ten	United States	
Terror in the Skies	23 March	National Geographic Channel	United States	
The Adventures of Puss in Boots	24 March	Netflix	United States	
Bloodline	24 March	Netflix	United States	
Marco Polo	24 March	Netflix	United States	
Nail'd It	24 March	LifeStyle You	United States	
Unbreakable Kimmy Schmidt	24 March	Netflix	United States	
Z Nation	1 April	Syfy	United States	
Junior Paramedics	1 April	BBC Knowledge	United Kingdom	
Licence to Drill	1 April	A&E	United States	
Pilots Under Pressure	1 April	Nat Geo People	United States	
Mecum Dealmakers	2 April	Discovery Turbo		
The Truth About Meat	2 April	BBC Knowledge	United Kingdom	
Underworld Inc.	2 April	National Geographic Channel	United States	
Killer Magic	3 April	FOX8	United States	
Posh Pawn	3 April	The LifeStyle Channel		
Barrett-Jackson	4 April	Discovery Turbo		
Bella and the Bulldogs	4 April	Nickelodeon	United States	
Instant Mom	4 April	Nickelodeon	United States	
Sonic Boom	4 April	Cartoon Network	United States; France	
Can't Stop	5 April	BBC Knowledge	United Kingdom	
The Grace Helbig Show	5 April	E!	United States	
House Vs House	5 April	LifeStyle Home		
My Tiny Terror	5 April	Animal Planet		
Double Divas	6 April	Style Network	United States	
Fashion Hunters	6 April	Style Network	United States	
Dual Survival	7 April	Discovery Channel	United States	
Friends to Lovers	7 April	Arena	United States	
Kingdom	7 April	FX	United States	
Border Country	8 April	History Channel		
Magic of Silence	8 April	Discovery Science		
Backroad Bounty	9 April	A&E	United States	
Marvel's Daredevil	10 April	Netflix	United States	
Turbo Pickers	10 April	Discovery Turbo		
Kirby Buckets	11 April	Disney XD	United States	
Wolf Hall	11 April	BBC First	United Kingdom	
Almost Human	12 April	Nine Network	United States	
London Irish	12 April	BBC First	United Kingdom	
Stalker	12 April	Nine Network	United States	
Ainsley Eats The Street	13 April	LifeStyle Food	United Kingdom	
Donnie Loves Jenny	13 April	Arena	United States	
The Watch	13 April	Nat Geo People		
Believe	15 April	Nine Network	United States	
Deadbeat	15 April	The Comedy Channel	United States	
Fear Thy Neighbour	15 April	CI Network		
Our Girl	16 April	ABC	United Kingdom	
Miles from Tomorrowland	18 April	Disney Junior	United States	
Inside The Mind of a Serial Killer	19 April	CI Network	United States	
Togetherness	21 April	showcase	United States	
Deadly Dilemmas	22 April	Discovery Science	United States	
Good Work	22 April	E!	United States	
Truckers	23 April	BBC First	United States	
StarTalk	27 April	National Geographic Channel	United States	
Invent It Rich	29 April	Discovery Science	United States	
Brothers Green: EATS!	30 April	MTV	United States	
Best in Bridal	1 May	LifeStyle You	United States	
Unlivable	1 May	LifeStyle Home	United States	
Why Planes Crash	1 May	Discovery Science	United States	
Asia from Above	2 May	History Channel	United States	
Mob Wives Chicago	2 May	Arena	United States	
Wild Colombia	3 May	Nat Geo Wild	United States	
Alvin and the Chipmunks	4 May	Nick Jr.	United States; France	
Gates	4 May	BBC First	United Kingdom	
Haunted Encounters	4 May	Bio.	United States	
In The Club	4 May	BBC First	United Kingdom	
The Ark	7 May	Nat Geo People	United States	
Grace and Frankie	8 May	Netflix	United States	
Buying the Beach	9 May	TLC	United States	
Fresh Off the Boat	10 May	FOX8	United States	
Alex Polizzi's Secret Italy	11 May	The LifeStyle Channel	United States	
Hollywood Scandals	11 May	Bio.	United States	
Granite Flats	14 May	Netflix	United States	
Wayward Pines	14 May	FX	United States	
Indian Summers	16 May	BBC First	United Kingdom	
Get Blake!	17 May	Nickelodeon	United States; France	
Little Charmers	18 May	Nick Jr.	United States; Canada	
The Property Brothers at Home	18 May	LifeStyle Home	United States	
Life on the Dole	20 May	Nine Network	United Kingdom	
Between	21 May	Netflix	Canada	
Breaking The Faith	22 May	TLC	United States	
Bitten	24 May	Presto	Canada	
The Firm	24 May	Presto	Canada	
Matador	24 May	Presto	United States	
The Real Housewives of Cheshire	24 May	Arena	United States	
Rogue	24 May	Presto	Canada	
Taxi Brooklyn	25 May	Netflix	United States	
My Big Fat Fabulous Life	26 May	TLC	United States	
Skin Wars	26 May	LifeStyle You	United States	
The Messengers	27 May	FOX8	United States	
The Passing Bells	28 May	BBC First	United Kingdom	
Aquarius	29 May	Presto	United States	
About A Boy	1 June	FOX8	United States	
Penn Zero: Part-Time Hero	1 June	Disney XD	United States	
Raymond Blanc: How To Cook Well	1 June	LifeStyle Food	United States	
Tiny House Hunting	1 June	LifeStyle Home	United States	
Zip Zip	1 June	Disney XD	France	
Bridge The Gap	2 June	Nat Geo People	United States	
Last Days of the Nazis	2 June	History Channel	United States	
Martha Stewart's Cooking School	2 June	LifeStyle Food	United States	
Pawn Stars South Africa	2 June	A&E	South Africa	
Rods N' Wheels	2 June	Discovery Turbo	United States	
Danielle Bryk: Flip Addict	3 June	LifeStyle Home	United States	
New Money	3 June	E!	United States	
Wheels That Fail	3 June	Discovery Turbo	United States	
Angels Among Us	4 June	SoHo	United States	
Celebrity Closet Confidential	4 June	Style Network	United States	
Extreme ER	4 June	Nat Geo People	United Kingdom	
Lorraine Pascale: How To Be A Better Cook	4 June	LifeStyle Food	United States	
Critical Listing	5 June	LifeStyle Home	United States	
Rachel Allen's Everyday Kitchen	5 June	LifeStyle Food	United States	
Harvey Beaks	6 June	Nickelodeon	United States	
The Messengers	6 June	FOX8	United States	
Ultimate Animals	6 June	Nat Geo Wild	United States	
Fail Army	7 June	FOX8	United States	
Project Runway: Threads	7 June	Arena	United States	
Stuff Happens	7 June	Discovery Science	United States	
Black Jesus	8 June	The Comedy Channel	United States	
Cabin Fever	9 June	National Geographic Channel	United States	
Dead Again	9 June	CI Network	United States	
The Jennie Garth Project	9 June	Style Network	United States	
Judge Geordie	9 June	MTV	United States	
X-Ray Mega Airport	9 June	Discovery Channel	United States	
The Fashion Fund	10 June	Bio.	United States	
Ancient X-Files	11 June	History Channel	United States	
Dead End Express	11 June	National Geographic Channel	United States	
Hangar 1: The UFO Files	11 June	History Channel	United States	
Secret Eskimo Escape	12 June	TLC	United States	
Dark Matter	13 June	Syfy	United States	
CSI: Cyber	14 June	Network Ten	United States	
Power	14 June	Stan	United States	
Satisfaction	14 June	showcase	United States	
Mr Sloane	15 June	BBC First	United Kingdom	
Innovation Nation	17 June	National Geographic Channel	United States	
So You Think You'd Survive	17 June	Discovery Science	United States	
Vanity Fair Confidential	17 June	CI Network	United States	
A Very British Airline	19 June	The LifeStyle Channel	United States	
Bahama Blue	19 June	Animal Planet	United States	
Taking New York	21 June	LifeStyle You	United States	
Wild Indonesia	21 June	Nat Geo Wild	United States	
Little Women: LA	22 June	Style Network	United States	
Mother Funders	22 June	Arena	United States	
Halt and Catch Fire	23 June	showcase	United States	
Alone	24 June	A&E	United States	
Pregnant and Dating	24 June	Style Network	United States	
Banished	25 June	BBC First	United Kingdom	
7 Deadly Sins	27 June	Nat Geo People	United States	
Lip Sync Battle	29 June	Nine Network	United States	
Tessa and Scott	29 June	LifeStyle You	United States	
Allegiance	30 June	SoHo	United States	
Great Bear Stakeout	30 June	Animal Planet	United States	
Dark Temptations	1 July	CI Network	United States	
Big Fish Man	3 July	Discovery Channel	United States	
A.D. The Bible Continues	5 July	Nine Network	United States	
Britain's Best Canals With John Sergeant	5 July	History Channel	United Kingdom	
The Great Human Odyseey	5 July	Discovery Channel	United States	
Three Men Go to New England	5 July	History Channel	United States	
Welcome to Sweden	5 July	The Comedy Channel	United States	
8 Minutes	6 July	CI Network	United States	
8 Out of 10 Cats	6 July	BBC UKTV	United Kingdom	
Railways of The Great War	6 July	History Channel	United Kingdom	
Secrets of Great British Castles	6 July	History Channel	United Kingdom	
Yukon River Run	6 July	National Geographic Channel	United States	
Britain's Bloodiest Dynasty	7 July	History Channel	United Kingdom	
Glue	7 July	SBS 2	United Kingdom	
Rugged Justice	7 July	Animal Planet	United States	
Strange Love	7 July	TLC	United States	
The Brink	7 July	showcase	United States	
The Last Alaskans	7 July	Discovery Channel	United States	
Wedding Betrayals	8 July	LifeStyle You	United States	
Shearing Gang	11 July	A&E	New Zealand	
Meet The Orangutans	13 July	Animal Planet	United States	
Zero Hour	13 July^{[d]}	Seven Network	United States	
Hollywood Cycle	15 July	E!	United States	
Million Dollar Critic	15 July	LifeStyle Food	United States	
Safe House	15 July	BBC First	United Kingdom	
Finding Carter	16 July	FOX8	United States	
Supertruckers	16 July	Discovery Turbo	United Kingdom	
For the Love of Cars	17 July	Discovery Turbo	United Kingdom	
Living in Secret	17 July	Bio.	United States	
Jacked	18 July	A&E	United States	
Nigel Slater: Eating Together	19 July	LifeStyle Food	United Kingdom	
Wild Arabia	19 July	Nat Geo Wild	United Kingdom	
Arctic Rescue	21 July	Discovery Channel	United States	
A Cook Abroad	21 July	LifeStyle Food	United Kingdom	
The Bachelor NZ	21 July	LifeStyle You	New Zealand	
Britain's Got the Builders In	22 July	The LifeStyle Channel	United Kingdom	
Born Naughty?	23 July	LifeStyle You	United Kingdom	
Building the Brand	23 July	Discovery Science	United States	
Fire in the Hole	24 July	Discovery Channel	United States	
Super Systems	24 July	Discovery Science	United States	
Ordinary Lies	25 July	BBC First	United Kingdom	
Young & Hungry	25 July	FOX8	United States	
I Am Cait	27 July	E!	United States	
Critical	28 July	BBC First	United States	
Jodie Marsh On...	28 July	TLC	United Kingdom	
Stewarts and Hamiltons	28 July	E!	United States	
The Mysteries of Laura	29 July	Nine Network	United States	
Sons of Winter	30 July	Discovery Channel	United States	
Wet Hot American Summer: First Day of Camp	31 July	Netflix	United States	
Matt Hatter Chronicles	1 August	Cartoon Network	United Kingdom; Canada	
Kandi's Ski Trip	2 August	Arena	United States	
Island Feast With Peter Kuruvita	2 August	Nat Geo People	United States	
Sex with Brody	2 August	E!	United States	
Mr. Pickles	3 August	The Comedy Channel	United States	
Rogue	3 August	SoHo	United States	
George of the Jungle	3 August	Cartoon Network	Canada	
Star vs. the Forces of Evil	3 August	Disney XD	United States	
Outrageous Acts of Psych	3 August	Discovery Channel	United States	
Taiwan: Island Of Fish	4 August	National Geographic Channel	United States	
What Could Possibly Go Wrong?	4 August	Discovery Science	United States	
Is Your Dog A Genius?	5 August	Nat Geo People	United States	
Seven Days With...	5 August	LifeStyle You	United Kingdom	
Tyger Takes On...	5 August	BBC Knowledge	United Kingdom	
Billy Connolly's Big Send Off	6 August	Bio.	United Kingdom	
Game of Homes	6 August	LifeStyle Home	Canada	
Jonathan Strange & Mr Norrell	6 August	BBC First	United Kingdom	
Weighing Up The Enemy	6 August	LifeStyle You	United Kingdom	
Mike's Ultimate Garage	7 August	LifeStyle Home	United States	
Bitten	8 August	FOX8	United States	
Expedition Burma	9 August	Nat Geo Wild	United States	
Make It Pop	10 August	Nickelodeon	United States	
Knights	11 August	History Channel	United States	
The Great Chelsea Garden Challenge	11 August	The LifeStyle Channel	United Kingdom	
People Just Do Nothing	12 August	Channel [V]	United Kingdom	
The Interceptor	12 August	BBC First	United Kingdom	
Girl Meets Gown	13 August	Style Network	United States	
Secret Societies	13 August	History Channel	United States	
Catching Monsters	14 August	Discovery Channel	United States	
Donut Showdown	14 August	LifeStyle Food	United States	
The Auction House	14 August	The LifeStyle Channel	United Kingdom	
Mr. Robot	14 August	Presto	United States	
Epic Mancave Builds	15 August	Discovery Channel	United States	
Million Dollar Listing San Francisco	17 August	Arena	United States	
Show Me a Hero	17 August	SoHo	United States	
Tales of Irish Castles	17 August	The History Channel	United Kingdom	
China from Above	18 August	National Geographic Channel	United States	
Diabolical Women	18 August	CI Network	United States	
Incredible Engineering Blunders: Fixed	18 August	Discovery Channel	United States	
Man Up	18 August	Style Network	United States	
Texas Rising	19 August	FX	United States	
The Good Buy Girls	19 August	Style Network	United States	
Stammer School	20 August	LifeStyle You	United Kingdom	
The Missing Evidence	20 August	The History Channel	United States	
WAGS	20 August	E!	United States	
Hitler's Last Secrets	21 August	The History Channel	United States	
Lego Star Wars: Droid Tales	21 August	Disney XD	United States	
Tackle My Reno	21 August	LifeStyle Home	United States	
CCTV: Caught On Camera	22 August	CI Network	United Kingdom	
Fear The Walking Dead	24 August	FX	United States	
Ice Age Giants	24 August	Animal Planet	United Kingdom	
Manhattan Love Story	26 August	Seven Network	United States	
Red Band Society	26 August	Seven Network	United States	
Eddie Stobart's Excellent Adventures	27 August	Discovery Turbo	United Kingdom	
Narcos	28 August	Netflix	United States	
100 Things to Do Before High School	29 August	Nickelodeon	United States	
Attenborough's Ark	31 August	Nat Geo Wild	United Kingdom	
Ghost Town Gold	1 September	GO!	United States	
South Beach Tow	1 September	GO!	United States	
Treasure Quest Snake Island	1 September	Discovery Channel	United States	
Birth of Empire: The East India Company	2 September	History Channel		
Lodging with Lions	2 September	Animal Planet	United States	
Lost in Transmission	2 September	A&E	United States	
Tattoo Fixers	2 September	GO!	United Kingdom	
The Great Underground War	2 September	History Channel		
Troy	2 September	GO!	United Kingdom	
Eat Well for Less?	3 September	LifeStyle You	United Kingdom	
Nature's Weirdest Events	5 September	Nat Geo Wild	United States	
What on Earth?	7 September	Discovery Channel	United States	
Secrets and Wives	8 September	Arena	United States	
The Mind of a Murderer	8 September	CI Network	United States	
American Dream Builders	9 September	LifeStyle Home	United States	
Love It Or List It UK	9 September	LifeStyle Channel	United Kingdom	
Race To Escape	9 September	Discovery Science	United States	
Naked and Afraid XL	10 September	Discovery Channel	United States	
2 Fat 2 Fly	11 September	A&E	United States	
Collectaholics	14 September	The LifeStyle Channel	United Kingdom	
The Expandables	14 September	LifeStyle Home	Canada	
Ballers	15 September	showcase	United States	
Man V Viral	17 September	National Geographic Channel	United Kingdom	
Code of a Killer	19 September	BBC First	United Kingdom	
Bad Bridesmaids	22 September	LifeStyle You	United States	
Catch a Contractor	22 September	A&E	United States	
Dash Dolls	22 September	E!	United States	
We Have Issues	23 September	E!	United States	
Back in Time for Dinner	24 September	The LifeStyle Channel	United Kingdom	
Sisterhood of Hip Hop	24 September	Channel [V]	United States	
Babylon	28 September	BBC First	United Kingdom	
The Daily Show with Trevor Noah	29 September	The Comedy Channel	United States	
Heroes Reborn	30 September	Seven Network	United States	
Rock This Boat: New Kids On The Block	1 October	Arena	United States	
Kew on a Plate	6 October	The LifeStyle Channel	United Kingdom	
My Giant Life	6 October	TLC	United States	
Curvy Girls Bridal	7 October	TLC	United States	
The Player	7 October	Seven Network	United States	
Chainsaw Gang	8 October	A&E	United States	
Home Fires	10 October	BBC First	United Kingdom	
Cuban Chrome	11 October	Discovery Channel	United States	
Limitless	11 October	Network Ten	United States	
Quantico	11 October	Seven Network	United States	
Storm Hunters	13 October	National Geographic Channel	United States	
Leepu & Pitbull	14 October	A&E	United States	
Stitchers	14 October	FOX8	United States	
Best Friends Whenever	16 October	Disney Channel	United States	
Carver Kings	18 October	LifeStyle Home	United States	
Life in Squares	27 October	BBC First	United Kingdom	
Blindspot	28 October	Seven Network	United States	
America's Cutest Pet	31 October	Animal Planet	United States	
Ash vs. Evil Dead	31 October	Stan	United States	
Show Me Your Garden	1 November	LifeStyle Home	United Kingdom	
From Darkness	1 November	BBC First	United Kingdom	
Outback Nation	2 November	LifeStyle Home	United States	
Prison Families	2 November	Nat Geo People	United States	
Wabbit	2 November	Boomerang	United States	
Apres Ski	3 November	Arena	United States	
Highway to Sell	4 November	Discovery Turbo	United States	
Lachey's Bar	4 November	A&E	United States	
Shipping Wars UK	5 November	A&E	United Kingdom	
Made in Chelsea: LA	8 November	LifeStyle You	United Kingdom	
Detectorists	9 November	BBC First	United Kingdom	
Gym Rescue	9 November	A&E	United States	
Million Pound Properties	9 November	The LifeStyle Channel	United Kingdom	
Storage Wars: Miami	9 November	A&E	United States	
The Bachelor: Canada	10 November	LifeStyle You	United States	
Legends	11 November	FX	United States	
Moonbeam City	15 November	The Comedy Channel	United States	
Black Work	16 November	BBC First	United Kingdom	
Alex Polizzi: Chefs on Trial	16 November	LifeStyle Food	United Kingdom	
The Box	16 November	LifeStyle Food	United Kingdom	
We Bare Bears	16 November	Cartoon Network	United States	
Breakthrough	17 November	National Geographic Channel	United States	
Doctor Foster	17 November	BBC First	United Kingdom	
Into the Badlands	17 November	showcase	United States	
Pacific Warriors	18 November	Discovery Channel	United States	
Jessica Jones	20 November	Netflix	United States	
Almost Royal	23 November	The Comedy Channel	United States	
How to Win at Everything	25 November	National Geographic Channel	United States	
The Woodsmen	26 November	A&E	United States	
Stonemouth	29 November	BBC First	United Kingdom	
Supergirl	6 December	FOX8	United States	
Yukon for Sale	6 December	LifeStyle Home	Canada	
The Trials of Jimmy Rose	7 December	BBC First	United Kingdom	
Waterfront House Hunting	7 December	LifeStyle Home	United States	
Work Out New York	7 December	Arena	United States	
The Making of the Mob	9 December	History Channel	United States	
How'd You Get So Rich?	10 December	Style Network	United States	
I Am Jazz	10 December	TLC	United States	
Operation Cloud Lab	10 December	BBC Knowledge	United Kingdom	
Belief	12 December	TLC	United States	
Gardener's World	12 December	LifeStyle Home	United Kingdom	
Yo-Kai Watch	14 December	9Go!	Japan	
Undateable	14 December	Nine Network	United States	
V.I.P.	14 December	Nine Network	United States	
The Bastard Executioner	15 December	Presto	United States	
Kings of the Wild	15 December	Discovery Channel	United States	
Life Is Toff	20 December	LifeStyle You	United States	
Be Cool, Scooby-Doo!	28 December	Boomerang	United States	
American Crime	29 December	Presto	United States	
The Muppets	29 December	Seven Network	United States	
Dinotrux	2015	ABC2	United States	
The Adventures of Puss in Boots	2015	ABC3	United States	
The Mr. Peabody & Sherman Show	2015	ABC3	United States	
Dawn of the Croods	2015	ABC3	United States	
A to Z	2015	Stan	United States	
Selfie	2015	Stan	United States	
Battle Creek	Scheduled for 2015 but did not air	Seven Network	United States	
Katherine Mills: Mind Games	Scheduled for 2015 but did not air	Seven Network	United Kingdom	
Marry Me	Scheduled for 2015 but did not air	Seven Network	United States	
Odyssey	Scheduled for 2015; debuted in 2016	Seven Network	United States	
The Whispers	Scheduled for 2015 but did not air	Seven Network	United States	

=== Telemovies and miniseries ===
List of domestic telemovie and miniseries premieres
Program	Original airdate(s)	Network	Source
The House of Hancock	8 February	Nine Network	
Catching Milat	17 & 24 May	Seven Network	
Peter Allen: Not the Boy Next Door	13 September	Seven Network	
Mary: The Making of a Princess	TBA	Network Ten	
The Peter Brock Story	Scheduled for 2015 but delayed to 2016	Network Ten	
Redfern Now: Promise Me	TBA	ABC	
The Secret River	14 June	ABC	

List of international telemovie and miniseries premieres
Program	Original airdate(s)	Network	Country of origin	Source
Olive Kitteridge	13 January	Showcase	United States	
Sons of Liberty	5 February	SBS	United States	
Pants on Fire	6 February	Disney XD	United States	
Bad Hair Day	17 April	Disney Channel	United States	
The Jinx: The Life and Deaths of Robert Durst	7 May	showcase	United States	
Houdini	23 June	Seven Network	United States	
Splitting Adam	27 June	Nickelodeon	United States	
Teen Beach 2	27 June	Disney Channel	United States	
Descendants	1 August	Disney Channel	United States	
7 Days in Hell	8 August	showcase	United States	
One Crazy Cruise	9 October	Nickelodeon	United States	
Regular Show: The Movie	28 November	Cartoon Network	United States	
Flesh and Bone	November	Stan	United States	
The Ridiculous 6	11 December	Netflix	United States	

=== Documentaries ===
List of domestic television documentary premieres
Program	Original airdate(s)	Network	Source
Saturday Night at the Movies	17 January	Fox Classics	
Sounds Like Teen Spirit: Triple J at 40	19 January	ABC	
James Cameron's Deep Sea Challenge	23 February	SBS	
Life on the Reef	1 March	ABC	
Reinventing the Royals	3 March	ABC	
Stop Laughing: This is Serious	22 March	ABC	
Afghanistan: The Australian War	TBA	ABC	
Bespoke	TBA	ABC	
Blood and Thunder	TBA	ABC	
Inside Labor	TBA	ABC	
Lest We Forget, What?	TBA	ABC	
Making Australia Great: Inside our Longest Boom	TBA	ABC	
No Excuses! with Sarah Ferguson	TBA	ABC	
Vietnam ANZACs	TBA	ABC	
The Walers: Australia's Great Warhorse	TBA	ABC	
Watch this Space	TBA	ABC	
The Waves of ANZAC Cove	TBA	ABC	

List of international television documentary premieres
Program	Original airdate(s)	Network	Country of origin	Source
Chef's Table	26 April	Netflix	United States	

=== Specials ===
List of domestic television special premieres
Program	Original airdate(s)	Network(s)	Source
Inside the Siege: The Untold Story	8 February	Seven Network	
Flushed	21 February	7TWO	
Neighbours: 30 Years	16 March	Network Ten; Eleven	
57th TV Week Logie Awards	3 May	Nine Network	
2015 Antenna Awards		C31 Melbourne	
2015 ARIA Awards	26 November	Network Ten; Eleven	
Schools Spectacular 2015	5 December	Nine Network; 9Gem	
Home and Away: An Eye for an Eye	9 December	Presto	
Carols in the Domain	19 December	Seven Network	
Vision Australia's Carols by Candlelight	24 December	Nine Network	
Sydney New Year's Eve	31 December	ABC; ABC3	

List of international television special premieres
Program	Original airdate(s)	Network(s)	Country of origin	Source
Hugh Laurie: Live on the Queen Mary	20 January	Bio.	United Kingdom	
The Comedy Central Roast of Justin Bieber	31 March	The Comedy Channel	United States	
Eurovision Song Contest's Greatest Hits	21 May	SBS	United Kingdom	
Mission Pluto	19 July	National Geographic Channel	United States	
A Very Murray Christmas	December	Netflix	United States	

== Programming changes ==
=== Changes to network affiliation ===
Criterion for inclusion in the following list is that Australian premiere episodes will air in Australia for the first time on a new channel. This includes when a program is moved from a free-to-air network's primary channel to a digital multi-channel, as well as when a program moves between subscription television channels – provided the preceding criterion is met. Ended television series which change networks for repeat broadcasts are not included in the list.

List of domestic television series which changed network affiliation
Program	Date	New network	Previous network	Source
River Cottage Australia	26 May	LifeStyle Food	The LifeStyle Channel	
Fashion Bloggers	4 June	E!	Style Network	
Plonk	18 June	Stan	Eleven	
A Place To Call Home	27 September	SoHo	Seven Network	
The Great Australian Bake Off	13 October	LifeStyle Food	Nine Network	

List of international television programs which changed network affiliation
Program	Date	New network	Previous network	Country of origin	Source
Lost Girl	26 January	Stan	SF	Canada	
SpongeBob SquarePants	16 March	GO!	Eleven	United States	
Community	18 March	Stan	GO!	United States	
House of Cards	24 March	Netflix	showcase	United States	
Arrow	17 May	GO!	Nine Network	United States	
Gotham	17 May	GO!	Nine Network	United States	
Suits	26 May	Universal Channel	Seven Network	United States	
Almost Human	7 June	GO!	Nine Network	United States	
Mr Selfridge	20 June	7TWO	Seven Network	United Kingdom	
Extant	27 July	Eleven	Network Ten	United States	
Empire	29 September	Eleven	Network Ten	United States	
Arrow	8 October	FOX8	GO!	United States	
Chicago Fire	29 October	SoHo	FOX8	United States	
From Dusk till Dawn	3 November	FX	SBS 2	United States	
Scandal	29 December	Presto	Seven Network	United States	

=== Free-to-air premieres ===
This is a list of programs which made their premiere on Australian free-to-air television that had previously premiered on Australian subscription television. Programs may still air on the original subscription television network.

List of international television programs which premiered on free-to-air television for the first time
Program	Date	Free-to-air network	Subscription network(s)	Country of origin	Source
Louis Theroux's LA Stories	5 February	ABC	BBC Knowledge	United Kingdom	
Terror in the Skies	21 May	Seven Network	National Geographic Channel	United States	
Dig	28 May	SBS	Stan	United States	
The Politician's Husband	2 August	ABC	BBC First	United Kingdom	
Peaky Blinders	28 September	ABC	BBC First	United Kingdom	
The Strain	TBA	Eleven	FOX8	United States	

=== Subscription premieres ===
This is a list of programs which made their debut on Australian subscription television, having previously premiered on Australian free-to-air television. Programs may still air (first or repeat) on the original free-to-air television network.

List of international television programs which premiered on subscription television for the first time
Program	Date	Free-to-air network	Subscription network(s)	Country of origin	Source
Under The Dome	4 January	Network Ten	TV H!TS	United States	
Brooklyn Nine-Nine	7 January	SBS	Universal Channel	United States	
Howard Defined	11 January	Seven Network^{[e]}	Sky News Australia	Australia	
Thank God You're Here	13 January	Network Ten; Seven Network	Comedy	Australia	
Scandal	22 January	Seven Network	SoHo	United States	
Mrs. Brown's Boys	15 February	Seven Network	BBC UKTV	United Kingdom	
Winners & Losers	6 July	Seven Network	SoHo	Australia	
From Dusk till Dawn	3 August	SBS 2	FX	United States	
Empire	31 August	Network Ten	FOX8	United States	
Motive	1 September	Seven Network	Universal Channel	Canada	
Please Like Me	13 September	The Comedy Channel	ABC	Australia	

=== Returning programs ===
Australian produced programs which are returning with a new season after being absent from television from the previous calendar year.

List of returning domestic television series
Program	Return date	Network	Original run	Source
RPM	8 March	Network Ten	1997—2011 (intermittently)	
Gruen	9 September	ABC	2008–2013	
The Celebrity Apprentice	16 September	Nine Network	2011–2013	

=== Endings ===
List of domestic television series endings
Program	End date	Network	Start date	Ref
Financial Review Sunday	25 March	Nine Network	5 May 2013	
Keneally and Cameron	27 March	Sky News Live	19 September 2014	
PVO NewsHour	28 May	Sky News Live	19 January 2014	
Million Dollar Minute	11 September	Seven Network	16 September 2013	
Santo, Sam and Ed's Total Football	12 May	Fox Sports	14 October 2013	

== See also ==
- 2015 in Australia
- List of Australian films of 2015

== Notes ==
- ^{a} Unconfirmed; filming postponed in August 2014.
- ^{b} Unconfirmed; in development as of September 2013.
- ^{c} Originally set to premiere in a previous year; auditions were announced in October 2012.
- ^{d} Unconfirmed; originally announced to air in 2013.
- ^{e} Originally aired as a segment on Seven Network's current affairs programme Sunday Night, rather than a stand-alone series
- ^{f} Made its free-to-air premiere the following night on Network Ten.
- ^{g} The first two episodes premiered on Nine, and subsequent episodes premiered on Stan.
- ^{h} Originally scheduled to premiere on 31 January 2015.
- ^{i} Originally scheduled to premiere on 23 February 2015.
- ^{j} Originally scheduled to premiere on 19 February 2015.
