= List of television programs: B =

Alphabetically indexed lists of television programs
0–9	A	B	C	D	E	F	G	H	I–J
K–L	M	N	O	P	Q–R	S	T	U–V–W	X–Y–Z

This is an alphabetical list of television program articles (or sections within articles about television programs). Spaces and special characters are ignored. This list covers television programs whose first letter (excluding "the") of the title is B.

== B ==
=== BA ===
- Baa Baa Black Sheep
- Babar
- Babar and the Adventures of Badou
- Babes
- Babestation
- Babushka
- Babylon 5
- Baby Blues (American TV series)
- Baby Boom
- Baby Daddy
- Baby Looney Tunes
- Baby Shark's Big Show!
- The Baby-Sitters Club
- A Baby Story
- Baby Talk
- Bachelor Father
- The Bachelor (Australia)
- The Bachelor (US)
- The Bachelor (UK)
- The Bachelor Canada
- The Bachelor New Zealand
- Bachelor Pad
- Bachelor in Paradise (Australia)
- Bachelor in Paradise (US)
- Bachelor in Paradise: After Paradise
- The Bachelor Presents: Listen to Your Heart
- The Bachelor Winter Games
- The Bachelorette (Australia)
- The Bachelorette (US)
- The Bachelorette Canada
- The Bachelorette India
- Back at the Barnyard
- Backstage
- Backstrom
- Back to the Floor (UK)
- Back to the Future: The Animated Series
- Back to You
- Baking It
- Backyard Blitz
- Backyard Science (Australia)
- The Backyardigans
- Bad Dog
- Bad Education
- The Bad Girl's Guide
- Bad Girls
- Bad Girls All-Star Battle
- Bad Girls Club
- Bad Girls Road Trip
- Bad Ink
- Bad Judge
- Bagdad Cafe
- Baggage
- Baggage Battles
- Bagpuss
- Bailando Kids (Argentina)
- Bailando por un Sueño (Argentina)
- Bake Off: The Professionals (UK)
- Bakugan
- Balamory
- Baller Wives
- Ballers
- Bam's Unholy Union
- Banacek
- Banshee
- The Banana Splits
- Band of Brothers
- Barátok közt (Hungary)
- The Barbara Stanwyck Show
- Barbarian Chronicles
- Barbie: Life in the Dreamhouse
- Barefoot Contessa
- Barefoot in the Park
- Barely Famous
- Baretta
- Bargain Hunt (British)
- Barnaby Jones
- Barney & Friends
- Barney Miller
- The Baron
- Bar Rescue
- Barry
- Barry'd Treasure
- Barter Kings
- Baseball Tonight
- Basil Brush
- Basketball Wives
- Basketball Wives LA
- Baskets
- Bat Masterson
- Bates Motel
- Batfink
- Bath Crashers
- Batman
- Batman and the Super 7
- Batman: The Animated Series
- Batman Beyond
- Batman: The Brave and the Bold
- The New Batman/Superman Adventures
- The Batman
- Battery Park
- Battle B-Daman
- Battle of the Blades (Canada)
- BattleBots
- Battle Creek
- Battle Dome
- Battle of the Network Reality Stars
- Battle of the Network Stars
- Battlestar Galactica (1978)
- Battlestar Galactica (2004)
- Batwoman
- The Baxters
- Bay City Blues
- Bayly
- Baywatch
- Baywatch Nights
- Barbie Dreamtopia

=== BB ===
- BBC Breakfast (UK)
- BBC Sunday-Night Play
- BBQ Blitz

=== BE ===
- The Beachcombers
- Beadle's About
- Beakman's World
- Beany and Cecil
- The Bear
- Bear Behaving Badly
- Bear in the Big Blue House
- Bear Grylls: Mission Survive
- Bearcats!
- BeastMaster
- The Beat
- Beat Bobby Flay
- Beat Bugs
- Beat The Chef
- Beat the Clock
- Beat Shazam
- Beating Heart
- The Beautiful Life: TBL
- Beauty and the Beast (Australian talk show)
- Beauty and the Beast (1987)
- Beauty & the Beast (2012)
- Beauty and the Geek
- Beauty School Cop Outs (UK)
- Beauty Match
- Beavis and Butt-Head
- Le Bébête Show
- Becker
- Becoming Us
- Be Cool, Scooby-Doo!
- The Bedford Diaries
- Bedtime Stories (UK)
- Beef
- Beetleborgs
- Beetlejuice
- Beforeigners
- Behind the Bash
- Behind Closed Doors
- Behind the Mask
- Behind the Music
- Being Erica
- Being Human (2009)
- Being Human (2011)
- Being Ian
- Bel-Ami: (1971)
- Belief
- Bella and the Bulldogs
- Belle and Sebastian (French, 1965)
- Belle and Sebastian (French, 2017)
- Belle and Sebastian (Japanese)
- Below Deck
- Below Deck Mediterranean
- Below Deck Sailing Yacht
- Bem-Vindos a Beirais
- Ben 10 (2005)
- Ben 10: Alien Force
- Ben 10: Ultimate Alien
- Ben 10: Omniverse
- Ben 10 (2016)
- Ben Casey
- Benidorm
- Ben & Holly's Little Kingdom
- Ben and Kate
- The Benny Hill Show
- The Ben Stiller Show
- Benson
- The Berenstain Bears (1985)
- The Berenstain Bears (2003)
- Bergerac
- Berlin
- Bernard
- The Bernie Mac Show
- Bert the Conqueror
- Bertha (TV series)
- Besame Tonto (Venezuela-Peru)
- Best Ed (Canada)
- Best Ever Trivia Show
- Best Friends Whenever
- Best Week Ever
- The Best Years
- Bethenny
- Bethenny Ever After
- Better
- Better Call Saul
- Better Homes and Gardens (Australia)
- Better Off Ted
- The Better Sex
- Better Things
- Better with You
- Bettina S.
- Betty White's Off Their Rockers
- Between the Lions
- Beugró
- Beverly's Full House
- The Beverly Hillbillies
- Beverly Hills, 90210
- Beverly Hills Teens
- Bewitched
- Beyblade
- Beyblade: Metal Fusion
- Beyond (Canada)
- Beyond (Singapore)
- Beyond (US)
- Beyond the Tank

=== BH ===
- BH90210

=== BI ===
- Bibleman
- Bienvenidos (Venezuela)
- Big Arvo
- The Big Bang Theory
- Big Bad Beetleborgs
- Big Blue
- The Big Brain Theory
- Big Break
- The Big Breakfast (UK)
- Big Brother
  - Big Brother (Australia)
  - Big Brother Brasil
  - Big Brother Canada
  - Big Brother (UK)
  - Big Brother (US)
- Big Brother: After Dark
- Big Brother: Over the Top
- Big City Greens
- The Big Comfy Couch
- Big Daddy's House
- The Big Family Cooking Showdown (UK)
- Big Fan
- Big Fat Gypsy Weddings (UK)
- The Biggest Loser
- The Big Gig
- Big Hero 6: The Series
- The Big House
- Big Kids
- Big Little Lies
- Big Love
- Big Man (South Korea)
- Big Mouth
- Big Nate
- The Big Picture
- Big Shot
- Big Sky
- The Big Story (1949)
- Big Town
- Big Time in Hollywood, FL
- Big Time Rush
- The Big Valley
- Big Wolf on Campus
- Bigfoot and Wildboy
- The Biggest Loser
- Bill and Ben
- The Bill
- Bill & Ted's Excellent Adventures (1990)
- Bill & Ted's Excellent Adventures (1992)
- Bill Nye Saves the World
- Bill Nye the Science Guy
- Billion Dollar Buyer
- Billions
- Billy (with Steve Guttenberg, 1979)
- Billy (with Billy Connolly, 1992)
- Billy Dilley's Super-Duper Subterranean Summer
- Billy the Cat
- Bindi the Jungle Girl (Australia)
- Bindi's Bootcamp (Australia)
- Bing
- Biography
- Biography: WWE Legends
- Bionic Six
- Bionic Woman
- The Bionic Woman
- Birds of a Feather
- Birds of Prey
- Birdz
- Bizaardvark

=== BJ ===
- B. J. and the Bear

=== BL ===
- Black and Blue (UK)
- Blackadder
- Blackboard Wars
- Black-ish
- Black Lightning
- The Blacklist
- The Blacklist: Redemption
- Blackpool
- Black Bird
- Black Books
- Black Butler
- The Black Donnellys
- Black Dynamite
- Black Ink Crew
- Black Ink Crew: Chicago
- Black Mafia Family
- Black Mirror (UK)
- Black Panther
- Blade
- Blade: The Series
- Blake's 7
- Blandings
- Blankety Blank
- Blansky's Beauties
- Blaster's Universe
- Blaze and the Monster Machines
- Blazing Dragons
- Bleach
- Bless the Harts
- Bless This House (UK)
- Bless This House (US)
- Bless This Mess
- Blind Date
- Blindspot
- Blood (South Korea)
- Bloodivores (China-Japan, 2016)
- Bloodline
- Blood Drive
- Blood, Sweat & Heels
- Blood Ties
- The Block
- Blockbuster
- Blockbusters
- Blonde Charity Mafia
- Blood & Oil
- Blood & Treasure
- Blossom
- Blow Out
- Blown Away
- Blue Bloods
- Blue Heelers
- Blue Mountain State
- Blue Peter
- Blue Thunder
- Blue's Clues 1996 2007
- Blue's Clues & You! 2019 2024
- Blue's Room 2004 2007
- Bluey (1976) (Australia)
- Bluey (2018) (Australia)

=== BO ===
- Bo on the Go! (Canada)
- Boardwalk Empire
- The Board
- Bob & Carol & Ted & Alice
- Bob and Margaret
- Bobb'e Says
- The Bobby Vinton Show (Canada)
- The Bob Cummings Show
- Bob Hearts Abishola
- Bob Hope Presents the Chrysler Theatre
- The Bob Newhart Show
- Bobobo-bo Bo-bobo
- Bob Patterson
- Bob the Builder
- Bob Vila
- Bob Vila's Home Again
- Bob's Full House
- Bob's Burgers
- Bobby's World
- Bocchi the Rock!
- Bodger & Badger
- Body Language
- BodyShaping
- BodyShock
- Boj
- BoJack Horseman
- The Bold and the Beautiful
- The Bold Ones
- The Bold Type
- Bonanza
- Bonding
- Bones
- Boney (Australia)
- Booba
- Boohbah (UK)
- The Book of Boba Fett
- The Book of Pooh
- The Book Quiz
- Booker
- Bonkers
- Bookie
- Bookish (UK)
- Bookmice
- Boon
- The Boondocks
- Boonie Bears (China)
- Boot Camp
- Bored to Death
- Borgia
- The Borgias (1981)
- The Borgias (2011)
- Born Free
- Boruto: Naruto Next Generations (2017, Japan)
- Bo' Selecta! (UK)
- The Boss Baby: Back in Business
- Bossy Bear
- Boston Common
- Boston EMS
- Boston Legal
- Boston Med
- Boston Public
- Botched
- Botched by Nature
- The Bots Master
- Bottersnikes and Gumbles
- Bottom
- Bourbon Street Beat
- Bowling For Dollars
- The Box (Australian TV series)
- The Box (Irish TV series)
- The Box (game show)
- Boy Band
- The Boyfriend (Japan)
- Boy Girl Dog Cat Mouse Cheese
- Boy Meets World
- The Boys
- Boyster
- The Bozo Show
- BOZ the Bear

=== BP ===
- B Positive

=== BR ===
- Bracken's World
- Brat Camp
- Braceface
- Bradley Walsh & Son: Breaking Dad (UK)
- The Brady Brides
- The Brady Bunch
- The Brady Bunch Hour
- The Brady Kids
- The Bradys
- Brady's Beasts
- The Brain (China)
- BrainDead
- Brain Game (1972)
- Brain Game (1997)
- Braingames (1983)
- Brain Games (2011)
- Brainiac: Science Abuse
- BrainSurge
- The Brak Show
- Branded
- Brandi & Jarrod: Married to the Job
- Brass Eye
- Bratz
- The Brave
- Bravestarr
- Braxton Family Values
- Bread
- Breadwinners
- Break the Bank (1948)
- Break the Bank (1976)
- Break the Bank (1985)
- Break with the Boss (UK)
- Breaker High (Canada)
- Breakfast News
- Breaking Amish
- Breaking Amish: Brave New World
- Breaking Away
- Breaking Bad
- Breaking Bonaduce
- Breakout Kings
- The Brian Keith Show
- Brickleberry
- Bridalplasty
- Bridezillas
- The Bridge
- Bridgerton
- Bridget Loves Bernie
- Bringing Up Bates
- Bringing Up Buddy
- Bring the Funny
- Bring It!
- The Brink
- Brimstone
- Britain's Got Talent
- Britain's Missing Top Model
- Britain's Next Top Model
- Britney and Kevin: Chaotic
- The Brittas Empire
- Broadchurch
- Broad City
- Broke Ass Game Show
- Broken Arrow
- Bromance
- Bromwell High
- Bronco
- Broke
- Brooke Knows Best
- Brooklyn Nine-Nine
- Brooklyn South
- Brookside
- Brotherly Love
- The Brothers (1972) (UK)
- Brothers & Sisters (1979)
- Brothers & Sisters (2006)
- The Brothers Sun
- Brum
- Bruno the Kid

=== BU ===
- Bubble Guppies
- The Buccaneers
- Buck Rogers
- Buck Rogers in the 25th Century
- Bucket & Skinner's Epic Adventures
- Buddy Deane Show
- Buffy the Vampire Slayer
- Bug Juice: My Adventures at Camp
- The Bugaloos
- Bugs (TV series)
- Bugs Bunny Builders
- The Bugs Bunny Show
- Bug Juice
- Bull (2000)
- Bull (2015)
- Bull (2016)
- Bull Session
- Bullseye (1980) (US)
- Bullseye (1981) (UK)
- Bullseye (2015) (US)
- Bumper Stumpers
- Bumpety Boo
- Bump in the Night
- Bunheads
- Bunk'd
- Bunny Maloney
- Bunnytown
- Bunsen Is a Beast
- Burke's Law (1963)
- Burke's Law (1994)
- Burn Notice
- Business Tonight
- Bustin' Loose
- Busting Loose
- Busy Tonight
- Busytown Mysteries
- The Busy World of Richard Scarry
- Butterbean's Café
- Buzz Bumble
- Buzz Lightyear of Star Command
- The Buzz on Maggie

=== BY ===
- Byker Grove

Previous: List of television programs: A Next: List of television programs: C
