= Portland shooting =

Portland shooting may refer to:

- 2012 Murder of Mollie Olgin, in Portland, Texas
- 2020 killing of Aaron Danielson
- 2022 Normandale Park shooting
- 2026 US Border Patrol shooting in Portland, Oregon
