= Bagpipes (disambiguation) =

Bagpipes are a woodwind instrument.

Bagpipes may also refer to:

- "Bagpipes" (How I Met Your Mother), a 2009 television episode
- Johnny Bagpipes, Australian snake catcher featured in the TV series Snake Boss
- Terence "Bagpipes" De La Croix, a fictional character in the British TV series In the Long Run

== See also ==
- Bagpiping (sexual act)
