= Say Yes to the Dress (disambiguation) =

Say Yes to the Dress is an American reality television program.

Other versions of it include:

- Say Yes to the Dress: Atlanta
- Say Yes to the Dress: Australia
- Say Yes to the Dress: UK
