= Jamie Dunn =

Australian television and radio personality (1950–2026)

- Born: James Edward Dunn; 12 August 1950; Brisbane, Queensland, Australia
- Died: 7 March 2026 (aged 75); Imbil, Queensland, Australia
- Occupations: Television and radio personality; actor; comedian; puppeteer; satirist; voice artist; singer-songwriter; drummer
- Years active: 1972−2025
- Known for: Agro

James Edward Dunn (12 August 1950 – 7 March 2026) was an Australian television and radio personality, puppeteer, comedian and voice artist. He began his entertainment career as a drummer and a singer-songwriter, before moving into television and finding success working the puppet Agro on the Seven Network shows Wombat and Agro's Cartoon Connection among others.

== Television ==
=== Agro ===
For four decades, Dunn had been the voice and operator of children's puppet character Agro. Dunn rarely appeared alongside Agro, as a typical ventriloquist might; when Agro appeared on camera or on stage, Dunn was always hidden, often by furniture.

Agro was originally created in 1981 by BTQ-7 employee Gary Rhodes. After a falling out with Seven led to Rhodes' resignation, several different operators were involved in working the puppet, with Dunn eventually hired by Seven in 1982 as a permanent replacement after they received a song demo recorded by Dunn about Agro which included an impression of the character. He began his career as Agro on Channel Seven's children shows Boris' Breakfast Club and Wombat.

In 1988, Agro appeared in the television musical Agro's Christmas Story, which was co-written and produced by Dunn. It was followed by A Very Agro Christmas in 1989. The character's popularity peaked with the morning children's show Agro's Cartoon Connection, which was noted for its sometimes provocative content, especially for a show aimed at children. The show, which won seven consecutive Logie Awards for Most Popular Children's Program between 1991 and 1997, ran from 1990 until its cancellation in 1997.

Dunn also owned certain rights to the character, such as merchandising rights, and had personal possession of the puppet. He parlayed Agro's popularity into other media, including four studio albums (of which three were nominated for ARIA Music Awards), video games, showbags, and even ice creams.

Agro's on-camera roles became less frequent in the late 1990s and into the 2000s as Dunn's radio commitments grew and the novelty of the character had worn off; however, he still made occasional appearances on television in commercials and in guest appearances. As late as December 2025, Dunn claimed that he was in discussions with Seven to produce an Agro Up Late special to air in 2026.

Following Dunn's death, the Agro puppet was donated to the National Film and Sound Archive by Dunn's widow Maree Dunn.

=== Other television ===
In 1996, Dunn created the children's television series Spuds In Duds, a parody of Bananas in Pyjamas with potatoes. Dunn co-wrote, produced and co-starred in the series with longtime creative partner Ian Calder. Originally intended to be a segment for Agro's Cartoon Connection, the series was broadcast on community television channel Briz 31.

Dunn was the narrator of the Animal Planet series Snake Boss.

== Radio ==
Up until 2005, Dunn was a member of a radio breakfast show in Brisbane. Dunn was an original member of the B105 morning crew, along with Donna Lynch and Ian Skippen, when the station was first launched on the FM band in 1990. Whereas originally Dunn performed on B105 as Agro, over time he came to be credited as himself, often playing dual roles as himself or the puppet. The B105 Morning Crew led the breakfast time slot ratings until the end of 2004 (for about 115 consecutive radio surveys).

Dunn performed stunts such as dressing in a gold string bikini as a meter-maid for a stroll around town, dressing as a bride for the "Bridezilla" competition, performing a cheerleader routine during the halftime break at a Broncos game, being scrubbed head to toe in a portable dog wash, and running a nude dash across a stage.

Dunn raised money through the station for the Royal Children's Hospital. The appeal aimed to raise money for vital equipment for the hospital based solely on donations from businesses and people in Brisbane. Dunn promoted the annual Christmas Appeal, including taking part in the 'K's for Kids' walk that stretched across Brisbane. Dunn had been an active ambassador for the conservationist organisation Wildlife Warriors.

On 21 September 2005, Dunn announced he was leaving B105. In 2006, he and Agro began to present on the Zinc Morning Zoo with Ian Calder and Courtney Burns on Sunshine Coast FM radio station Zinc 96. He left Zinc 96 on 17 October 2008.

In 2009, Dunn began broadcasting a talkback show on 1116 4BC, departing on 29 October 2010.

Dunn returned to Brisbane radio nearly a decade later to host an hourly Saturday morning show on the Triple M network.

== Other performances ==
Dunn's early performing days were spent as a singer-songwriter and as drummer for the Brisbane band Hands Down.

Dunn co-starred in the film True Love, directed by Robert Braiden, for which he won the first Runner-up Best Actor Award at the 2012 Picture Start Film Festival in New York.

== Subject of stalking ==
Between 2012 and September 2014, Dunn was stalked by a journalist he had met several times but hardly knew who was sending up to 50 emails a day. After pleading guilty to stalking in Caboolture Magistrates' Court in December 2014 she was fined $1,000 and put on a two-year good behaviour bond with no conviction recorded.

== Death ==
Dunn died in Imbil, Queensland, on 7 March 2026 at the age of 75.

== Discography ==
=== Charting singles ===
List of singles, with selected chart positions
| Year | Title | Peak chart positions |
| Year | Title | AUS |
|---|---|---|
| 1975 | "Jamie Come Home" | 42 |
| 1978 | "Fun Fun Fun" | 79 |
