= Discovery Travel & Living =

Television channel

- Final logos, used between 2010 and 2013 For the UK
- Headquarters: Silver Spring, Maryland

Ownership
- Owner: Discovery Communications
- Sister channels: Discovery Home & Health and Discovery Real Time

History
- Launched: 1998; 27 years ago
- Closed: September 1, 2010 (Rest of Asia); September 1, 2010 (Australia/New Zealand); October 2010 (Poland); 20 January 2011 (Romania); July 4, 2011 (Netherlands & Flanders); November 1, 2011 (Latin America)
- Former names: Discovery Travel & Adventure

Discovery Travel & Living was a channel brand from Discovery Communications. This name was used in countries of Europe, Latin America and Asia. In other parts of the world the channel is known as Travel and Living Channel. It features travel shows rather than the documentaries on Discovery Science.

Discovery Travel & Living was launched as Discovery Travel & Adventure Channel. In early 2005 it was repositioned and rebranded as Discovery Travel & Living as a part of a "lifestyle" package from Discovery Communications, also including Discovery Home & Health and Discovery Real Time.

Starting in Norway in March 2010, Discovery Networks rolled out the TLC brand internationally. The rollout of TLC mostly replaced the Discovery Travel & Living.

== Current services ==
The following versions of the channel currently exists:

- Discovery Travel & Living China

== Former services ==
These versions were either rebranded as TLC, or ceased operations:

- Discovery Travel & Living Asia (became TLC on September 1, 2010)
- Discovery Travel & Living Australia/New Zealand (became TLC on September 1, 2010)
- Discovery Travel & Living Europe (rebranded into local versions of TLC and other channels of Discovery)
- Discovery Travel & Living Taiwan (became TLC on September 1, 2010)
- Discovery Travel & Living India (became TLC on September 1, 2010)
- Discovery Travel & Living Latin America (Local versions)(became TLC: Travel & Living Channel on November 1, 2011)
- Discovery Travel & Living Viajar y Vivir was a Spanish language US version. In November 2007, it was merged with Discovery Kids en Español to form Discovery Familia.
