= Sky Channel =

Sky Channel may refer to:

- Sky Channel (1984-1989), a satellite television channel in Europe that broadcast in the 1980s and went on to become Sky One
- Sky Channel (Australia), a national horse racing television network in Australia operated by Tabcorp Holdings

== See also ==
- Sky News Channel
- Sky News Business Channel
- Sky Racing Channel
- Sky Radio
