= Racing.com =

Australian television channel

- Type: Racing
- Country: Australia
- Broadcast area: Nationwide
- Network: Seven Network; Foxtel

Programming
- Language: English
- Picture format: 576i SDTV

Ownership
- Owner: Seven Media Group; Racing Victoria
- Sister channels: On pay television; Sky Racing; On free-to-air; Channel 7; 7HD; 7two; 7mate; 7flix; 7Bravo; TVSN

History
- Launched: 29 August 2015; 11 years ago
- Replaced: TVN (on Foxtel) Fresh Ideas TV (on Seven O&O) except regional stations acquired by Seven West Media in the past year like Prime7 and GWN7. Aspire TV (on Southern Cross Austereo's Seven affiliated stations.)

Links
- Website: racing.com

Availability

Terrestrial
- Freeview Seven owned (virtual): 78/68
- Freeview Seven Regional (virtual): 68

Streaming media
- Racing.com: Live Vision
- Seven Network: 7plus

Racing.com (stylised as RACING.COM) is an Australian free-to-air standard-definition digital television channel, owned and operated by the Seven Network and Racing Victoria. The channel broadcasts live Victorian, South Australian, Western Australian and Hong Kong horse racing, news, racing statistics and information, race replays, event calendars and other related media.

The service officially launched on 29 August 2015, after a blackout of Victorian horse races by Sky Racing, and is available to viewers in metropolitan areas, as well as regional areas via Southern Cross Television, and nationally via Foxtel.

== History ==
Following a blackout of Victorian horse racing by Sky Racing on 16 June 2015, Seven West Media and Racing Victoria entered into talks and reached an agreement to broadcast an interim feed sourced from the Racing.com website's live stream starting 26 June 2015. Seven in regional areas began an interim broadcast on channel 68 on 28 July 2015. The channel was officially launched on 29 August 2015, with Seven stations in Tasmania, Darwin, Broken Hill and Spencer Gulf, Remote Central and Eastern Australia commencing broadcasting on the same day. Foxtel began broadcasting the channel on 12 September 2015.

Dubai World Cup Carnival 2016 announced that it will broadcast the final three meetings of the Dubai World Cup Carnival on Racing.com.

On 1 August 2017, Racing.com began broadcasting South Australian Racing following the successful closing of a seven-year content deal with Thoroughbred Racing South Australia in June.

== See also ==
- List of digital television channels in Australia
