= Club Superstation =

- Country: Australia

Programming
- Language: English

History
- Launched: 1985
- Closed: 1987

Club Superstation was an Australian satellite television service.

Operating from 1985 to 1987, it is widely regarded as Australia's first subscription television channel, predating the launch of Australia's mainstream pay television services by almost a decade. The service was distributed via satellite exclusively to licensed clubs and hotels throughout New South Wales, offering a mixture of live international sport, racing coverage and music programming.

Following its acquisition by entrepreneur Alan Bond in 1987, Club Superstation was merged into Sky Channel, ending its brief operation.

== History ==
Club Superstation was conceived in 1984 by Lyle McCabe and Ross Pitts of Sydney Centre Television as Australia's first subscription television service. The channel was developed during a period when Australian broadcasters were experimenting with satellite technology following the introduction of the national Aussat satellite system. The channel was bought and launched the following year by Australian businessman Robert Holmes à Court.

Club Superstation commenced transmissions from its Sydney studios on 14 October 1986. Programming consisted of sports events ranging from football, boxing, darts and greyhound racing from around the world, as well as a music video programme between matches. The channel was distributed exclusively to hotels and clubs in New South Wales via satellite. Club Superstation competed directly with the newly launched Sky Channel and Sportsplay, both of which targeted a similar hospitality audience.

Club Superstation was also notable for launching the television careers Richard Wilkins and Peter Overton, who would both later continue working for the Nine Network.

Club Superstation was sold by à Court to Alan Bond in June 1987, and was absorbed into Bond's Sky Channel. Sky Channel moved operations to Club Superstation's former Sydney studios that same year.

== See also ==
- Sky Channel
- Sportsplay
- Television broadcasting in Australia
