= Fresh Ideas TV =

- Country: Australia
- Broadcast area: Sydney, Melbourne, Brisbane, Adelaide, Perth, Regional QLD
- Network: Seven Network

Programming
- Language: English
- Picture format: 576i (SDTV) 16:9

Ownership
- Owner: Seven West Media
- Sister channels: Seven; 7TWO; 7mate 4ME

History
- Launched: 22 November 2013
- Closed: 1 December 2014
- Replaced by: Racing.com

Availability

Terrestrial
- Freeview Seven owned (virtual): 78/68

Fresh Ideas TV was a digital advertorial datacasting channel owned by the Seven Network. The channel launched on 22 November 2013 and broadcast infomercials and home shopping content on channel 78.

The channel was available to Seven's metropolitan markets of Sydney, Melbourne, Brisbane, Adelaide and Perth as well as their regional Queensland station. Fresh Ideas TV was closed on 1 December 2014. Channel 78 was later re-purposed for Racing.com, which began broadcasting on 26 June 2015.
