= Bettina Sågbom =

Finnish journalist

Bettina Maria Sågbom-Ek (born 1 September 1965 in Hanko) is a Swedish-speaking Finnish journalist. She is the host of the talk show Bettina S., which is aired on the Finnish national television network Yle Fem.

Sågbom married and has two children.
