= Bettina S. =

- Starring: Bettina Sågbom
- Country of origin: Finland
- Original language: Swedish

Original release
- Network: YLE
- Release: 2003

Bettina S. is a Finnish talk show, hosted by Bettina Sågbom and produced by Yle Fem. The show is also broadcast on Yle TV2. However, the show is ten minutes longer on Yle Fem.

The show premiered in 2003 and in the same year won the Venla prize for Best Entertainment Show of 2003.

== Guests ==
This list is incomplete; only the most famous guests have been mentioned here

- Alcazar
- Bodies Without Organs
- Paulo Coelho
- Jan Guillou
- Ken Hom
- Tomas Ledin
- Helmut Lotti
- Mikael Niemi
- Tina Nordström
- Sara Nunes
- Conan O'Brien
- Outlandish
- Pandora
- Åsne Seierstad
- Sri Sri Ravi Shankar
- Anna Strömberg (Miss Finland 2003)
- Titiyo
- Christian Walz
- Within Temptation
- Jane Fonda
- Hanoi Rocks

== Staff ==
- Host - Bettina Sågbom
- Producer - Robert Portman
- Michael Cronström
- Lissu Litmanen
- Pia Stråhlman
