= TVN (Australian TV channel) =

- Country: Australia

Programming
- Language: English
- Picture format: 576i (SDTV 16:9)

Ownership
- Owner: Racing Victoria

History
- Launched: May 2005; 21 years ago
- Closed: 15 March 2015; 11 years ago
- Replaced by: Racing.com (on Foxtel)

TVN (Thoroughbred Vision) was an Australian thoroughbred horse-racing TV channel. It was carried on Foxtel, Austar and Optus TV, as well as other subscription TV services. The channel was set up by the Victorian thoroughbred racing industry and Sydney metropolitan racing clubs as an alternative to Sky Racing and as an attempt by the racing clubs concerned "to capture the valuable assets of racing media rights and leverage them to the benefit of racing".

TVN was 50% owned by Victorian racings organisations Melbourne Racing Club, Victoria Racing Club, Moonee Valley Racing Club and Country Racing Victoria; and 50% by the Sydney-based, Australian Turf Club. It launched in May 2005 and ceased almost 10 years later in March 2015.

== History ==
Prior to the launch of TVN, Sky Channel purchased the rights to broadcast race meetings from almost all racing clubs across the country and then resold the rights to pubs and clubs, back to the racing venues and also to DTH subscribers.

TVN was formed after TabCorp, the owner of Sky Racing, pulled out of plans it was developing with Racing Victoria Limited in February 2005 to launch a dedicated thoroughbred racing channel apart from Sky Channel's other broadcasts, which included harness racing and greyhound racing, with Sky Channel chief executive Peter Caillard stating that "the fledgling TVN model is a risky proposition to all the racing codes and is not in a position to showcase thoroughbred racing to its full potential".

Victorian racing clubs planned to continue launching the service and won the support of the Australian Jockey Club and Sydney Turf Club when they announced their intention not to re-sign with Sky Channel when their contracts came up for renewal in March 2005. Both the AJC and STC supported TVN and a partnership was formed with Racing Victoria Limited. In May 2005, existing contracts between Victorian raceclubs and Sky Channel ended and these were then signed over to TVN.

The service was initially only available on the Foxtel platform, but Sky Channel had exclusivity agreements with some race meetings through Sky Racing. In August 2005, Sky successfully obtained an injunction against TVN and pay TV carrier Austar, stopping Austar from broadcasting TVN. However, broadcast agreements were eventually extended to Austar and Optus.

On 21 January 2015, after years of stalled broadcast rights negotiations with Tabcorp, Racing NSW withdrew its support for TVN and brokered a new deal which would see its race meetings broadcast exclusively on Sky Racing. This new deal left TVN with the broadcast rights to only Victorian-based meetings. In February 2015, TVN announced their closure and ceased broadcasting on 15 March 2015. Sky Racing launched a brand new channel on 21 March 2015. Sky Throughbred Central - which replaces Sky Racing World, showcases race meetings from New South Wales, as well as extended international coverage. General Manager of Sky Racing Gerard Patane said "The decision to rebrand our thoroughbred-only channel reflects the recently announced 10-year deal with Racing NSW and the Australian Turf Club." TVN was replaced with Racing.com on Foxtel on the 29th of August 2015.

== Programming ==
Main programs were Raceday Live and Racenight Live. Raceday Live provided extensive coverage of the three main thoroughbred meetings of the day, mostly from Victoria and New South Wales. Racenight Live provided coverage of Singapore and Hong Kong thoroughbred meetings and also coverage of Canterbury (Sydney) and Moonee Valley (Melbourne) night meetings in spring and summer. It also provided coverage of Royal Ascot meetings in June.
