= Discovery Kids (Australia) =

Australian television channel

Discovery Kids Australia
- Logo used until 2020
- Country: Australia
- Broadcast area: Australia

Programming
- Language: English
- Picture format: 576i (16:9 SDTV)

Ownership
- Owner: Warner Bros. Discovery Asia-Pacific
- Sister channels: Discovery Channel; Animal Planet; Discovery Science; Discovery Turbo; TLC

History
- Launched: 3 November 2014; 11 years ago
- Replaced: Discovery Home & Health
- Closed: 1 February 2020; 6 years ago

Links
- Website: www.discoverychannel.com.au/discovery-kids/ www.dkids.com.au

Availability (at time of closure)

Streaming media
- Foxtel Go: Channel 718

Discovery Kids (stylised as Discovery K!ds) was an Australian subscription television channel, aimed at 2-6 year olds screening factual and educational programming. The channel launched on Foxtel on 3 November 2014.

The channel replaced Discovery Home & Health, whose select programming moved to TLC.

The channel ceased operations on 1 February 2020, after which the channel space created in 2007 by Discovery Home & Health ceased to exist. No reason was given to why it ceased.
