= Vanity Fair Confidential =

American true crime television series

- Genre: True crime Documentary
- Written by: Mark Mori
- Narrated by: Martin Koughan
- Composer: Robert Allen Elliott
- Country of origin: United States
- Original language: English
- No. of seasons: 4
- No. of episodes: 48

Production
- Producers: Andy Montoya-Montes; Shalla Yudelevich
- Cinematography: Omar Saleem
- Running time: 45 minutes
- Production company: Condé Nast Entertainment

Original release
- Network: Investigation Discovery
- Release: January 19, 2015 – April 30, 2018

Vanity Fair Confidential is an American documentary television series on Investigation Discovery that debuted in 2015.

== Synopsis ==
The series examines different true crime stories that were once across the pages of Vanity Fair Magazine. With the help of the article writers, and the people involved (investigators, family members etc.) they present these stories for the audience.

== Episodes ==
| Season | Episodes | Originally released | |
| Season | Episodes | First released | Last released |
|---|---|---|---|
| 1 | 12 | January 19, 2015 | April 6, 2015 |
| 2 | 12 | January 4, 2016 | March 21, 2016 |
| 3 | 10 | January 23, 2017 | April 10, 2017 |
| 4 | 4 | February 5, 2018 | April 30, 2018 |

== Season 1 (2015) ==
| No. overall | No. in season | Title | Case | Contributor | Original release date |
|---|---|---|---|---|---|
| 1 | 1 | The Runaway Doctor | Mark Weinberger | Buzz Bissinger | January 19, 2015 |
In 2004, Michelle Kramer husband vanishes during their holiday in Mykonos. Determined to find him, she discovers he is a wanted criminal with a twisted tale of greed, power and malpractice that shook Merrillville, Indiana.
| 2 | 2 | The Fugitive Heir | Robert Durst | Ned Zeman | January 26, 2015 |
Three unsolved crimes are linked to one man.
| 3 | 3 | Prisoner of Denver | Lisl Auman | Mark Seal | February 2, 2015 |
A young woman is entangled in a murder case, which raises more questions than answers. When Hunter S. Thompson hears about her case, he starts a crusade to free her.
| 4 | 4 | The Lady Vanishes | Madalyn Murray O'Hair | Mimi Swartz | February 9, 2015 |
When the political activist mysteriously disappears from Austin, Texas, she sets off one of the most baffling missing persons cases in American history.
| 5 | 5 | The Vanishing Woman | Michael Lee Jones | Mark Bowden | February 16, 2015 |
A woman is brutally violated in Miami. Private investigator Ken Brennan investigation uncovers other similar attacks in New Orleans and Colorado Springs, and sets off a hunt for a man with dark intentions.
| 6 | 6 | The Counterfeit Rockefeller | Christophe Rocancourt | Bryan Burrough | February 23, 2015 |
After arresting a man for fraud, police from East Hampton, New York find out the man they arrested is a wanted conman.
| 7 | 7 | Don't Ask Don't Kill | Murder of Barry Winchell | Buzz Bissinger (2) | March 2, 2015 |
A soldier is found bludgeoned to death on a military base. The Army calls it a fight that went too far. But investigators discover a love story gone wrong.
| 8 | 8 | Alter Ego | John Edward Robinson | David McClintick | March 9, 2015 |
A seemingly ordinary man had sinister secrets. It took investigators years to uncover all his vicious crimes.
| 9 | 9 | Mad About the Boys | Lou Pearlman | Bryan Burrough (2) | March 16, 2015 |
The impresario behind Backstreet Boys and NSYNC fled the country, as law enforcement officials began an international manhunt for his crimes.
| 10 | 10 | Legend with a Bullet | Murder of Lana Clarkson | Robert Sam Anson | March 23, 2015 |
Phil Spector was called the "First Tycoon of Teen", but in his private life he spiral out of control, resulting in tragedy.
| 11 | 11 | The White House Boys | Florida School for Boys | David Kushner | March 30, 2015 |
When 500 men come forward with stories of horrific beatings and sexual abuse from their childhood, journalists uncovered a disturbing legacy and unimaginable cruelty of a highly regarded reform school.
| 12 | 12 | Presumed Guilty | Jeanine Nicarico murder case | M. A. Farber | April 6, 2015 |
Three men are convicted for the murder of a 10-year-old girl from Naperville, Illinois. However, as new information comes to light, the prosecution case seems more questionable.

== Season 2 (2016) ==
| No. overall | No. in season | Title | Case | Contributor | Original release date |
|---|---|---|---|---|---|
| 13 | 1 | Nightmare on Elwood Avenue | Dean Faiello | Bryan Burrough (3) | January 4, 2016 |
In 2003, financial analyst Maria Cruz vanishes from Manhattan, and the last man she saw is also missing. Clues lead police to a Newark, New Jersey home, to reveal a tale of medical fraud and murder.
| 14 | 2 | Buried Alive | Murder of Brett Bowyer | Buzz Bissinger (3) | January 11, 2016 |
In 2002, panic blankets Opelika, Alabama as an elderly couple is found brutally murdered. As detectives try to solve the case, another even more unspeakable crime occurs in nearby Phenix City, Alabama.
| 15 | 3 | The Killing Trail | Violence against LGBTQ people | Buzz Bissinger (4) | January 18, 2016 |
A series of savage and vicious attacks against LGBTQ people rampant across Texas communities spiked by hatred. Note: The episode especially focuses on: Murder of Mollie Olgin in Sinton, Texas, Thanh Nguyen in Dallas, and Nicholas West in Tyler, Texas.
| 16 | 4 | Code of Dishonor | Sexual assault in the United States military | Clara Bingham | January 25, 2016 |
Every year, women in the military endure brutal attacks from their comrades. An organization that ignores violence against women.
| 17 | 5 | The Perfectly Sinister Mr. Rockefeller | Christian Gerhartsreiter | Mark Seal (2) | February 1, 2016 |
A victim of a grisly murder in San Marino, California is uncovered after decades. The assailant claims to be a member of a prominent family.
| 18 | 6 | Days of Rage | Cathlyn Platt Wilkerson and Kathy Boudin | Bryan Burrough (4) | February 8, 2016 |
In the 1970s, violent fringe groups declare war against the USA. But these people are homegrown, graduates of the finest universities.
| 19 | 7 | Bill Cosby Drugged Me | Bill Cosby sexual assault cases | Beverly Johnson | February 15, 2016 |
Five women who claim Bill Cosby assaulted them share their stories.
| 20 | 8 | Love's Deadly Harness | Susan Cummings | Judy Bachrach | February 22, 2016 |
A billionaire heiress and a revered Argentinian polo player world collide with deadly consequences.
| 21 | 9 | Death of a Warrior Poet | Murder of Tupac Shakur | Robert Sam Anson (2) | February 29, 2016 |
Tupac Shakur was a revolutionary poet, and a music industry phenomenon. Gunned down at 25-years-old, his death remains a mystery.
| 22 | 10 | The Widow on the Hill | Murder of Hamilton Summerville | Michael Shnayerson | March 7, 2016 |
When the owner of a hilltop estate dies suspiciously, the eyes of Orange, Virginia turn to his second wife.
| 23 | 11 | A Crime of Shadows | Online predator | Mark Bowden (2) | March 14, 2016 |
Katie Tarbox and Michele Deery share a mission: to expose dark secrets about sexual online predators.
| 24 | 12 | Angel of Death | Final Exit Network | Ron Rosenbaum | March 21, 2016 |
Mysterious deaths around the country baffle authorities, all inspired by the philosophy of Jack Kevorkian.

== Season 3 (2017) ==
| No. overall | No. in season | Title | Case | Contributor | Original release date |
|---|---|---|---|---|---|
| 25 | 1 | The Fugitive Son | Alex Kelly | Jennet Conant | January 23, 2017 |
A star athlete from a wealthy family brutally rapes several teenage girls. An international manhunt ensues as he eludes capture by the FBI and Interpol.
| 26 | 2 | Murder on the Sunset Strip | Carol Bundy and Doug Clark | Mark McNamara | January 30, 2017 |
In 1980, a multiple serial killers stalks Los Angeles. When an unidentified caller telephones police, they must decipher fact from fiction as the woman confesses to a bizarre series of events.
| 27 | 3 | Murder at the Drama Club | Murder of Robert LeCompte | Adam Teicholz | February 6, 2017 |
In Houma, Louisiana, a man is found brutally murdered in a nightclub. Police have more questions than answers: Was it a hate crime? Was he the victim of Ronald Dominique? What do the strange clues mean?
| 28 | 4 | Seeds of Doubt | Carlton Gary | David Rose | February 13, 2017 |
A ferocious serial killer is captured in Columbus, Georgia and sentenced to death. However, doubts about his guilt are raised years later.
| 29 | 5 | Grounds for Murder | Murder of Morgan Dana Harrington | Sarah Ellison | February 20, 2017 |
A young student is killed in an elite college town. Panic pervades the community when, years later, Hannah Graham is also found murdered.
| 30 | 6 | Nightmares on Main Street | Oak Hill satanic ritual abuse trial | Leslie Bennetts | February 27, 2017 |
A married couple is accused of abusing children in their day care. But are the allegations true?
| 31 | 7 | Dead Reckoning | Henry Lee Lucas | Ron Rosenbaum (2) | March 6, 2017 |
A drifter claims to have committed hundreds of brutal murders. Years later, people start to have doubts about his statements.
| 32 | 8 | Bikram Feels the Heat | Bikram Choudhury | Benjamin Wallace | March 13, 2017 |
Bikram Yoga is considered the world's most popular yoga, yet several women claim its founder sexually harassed and assaulted them.
| 33 | 9 | Locked Up Next Door | Sex trafficking | Mimi Swartz (2) | March 20, 2017 |
Behind closed doors, untold numbers of young women across America are being held captive and forced to work in a perilous industry.
| 34 | 10 | St. George's Hidden Dragons | St. George's School | Benjamin Wallace (2) | March 27, 2017 |
An elite New England prep school is under fire for decades-old allegations of sexual abuse of students by staff members.
| 35 | 11 | Dylann Roof's Radical White Rage | Charleston church shooting | Tina Nguyen | April 3, 2017 |
A twisted, hateful ideology led a teenager to launch an unprovoked attack against innocent people. At the same time, a similar detestable bomb plot happens in Garden City, Kansas.
| 36 | 12 | Lost in Paradise | Murder of Natalee Holloway | Bryan Burrough (5) | April 10, 2017 |
A young girl disappears while on vacation. Years later, another young woman is murdered in a hotel room. An international manhunt begins to stop a callous criminal.

== Season 4 (2018) ==
| No. overall | No. in season | Title | Case | Contributor | Original release date |
|---|---|---|---|---|---|
| 37 | 1 | Shadows on the Lawn | A Rape on Campus | Sarah Ellison (2) | February 5, 2018 |
In 1984, a woman is assaulted by her fellow students at the University of Virginia. Thirty years later, another student at the same college speaks about an encounter with striking similarities.
| 38 | 2 | The Boy Who Cried Author | J.T. LeRoy | Bruce Handy | February 12, 2018 |
A young author's meteoric rise to fame and fortune isn't what it seems. Soon, a major literary hoax is exposed to the world.
| 39 | 3 | Was Bambi Framed? | Laurie Bembenek | Bob Drury and Marnie Inskip | February 19, 2018 |
Some people say she is a murderer. Others insist she didn't pull the trigger and is a victim of injustice. Two Vanity Fair writers set out to uncover the truth.
| 40 | 4 | The Secret of the Summer Wind | Thomas Capano | Jennet Conant (2) | February 26, 2018 |
When Anne Marie Fahey vanishes without a trace, her disappearance sets off an investigation exposing the dark secrets of one of the most powerful men in Wilmington, Delaware.
| 41 | 5 | Intimations of Murder | Robert Bierenbaum | Lisa DePaulo | March 5, 2018 |
Gail Katz disappears without evidence of foul play. Her family has no doubts that her husband murdered her. However, proving it is challenging for investigators.
| 42 | 6 | Scientology's Vanished Queen | Disappearance of Shelly Miscavige | Ned Zeman (2) | March 12, 2018 |
She is the first lady of a controversial religion. However, she vanished from public view. The truth lies in a world of surveillance and secrecy.
| 43 | 7 | Murder Most Obsessive | Murder of Vicki Morgan | Dominick Dunne | March 19, 2018 |
An aspiring actress is bludgeoned to death. After her roommate confesses to the cops, it seems like an open-and-shut case. But rumors start to circulate that she was silenced for secrets she knew.
| 44 | 8 | Sins of the Mother | Sante Kimes | Suzanna Andrews | March 26, 2018 |
She was a charming, skillful deceiver with a diabolical attitude—a criminal mastermind willing to kill to get what she wanted.
| 45 | 9 | The Disco Inferno | Chris Paciello | Suzanna Andrews (2) | April 2, 2018 |
He was adored by celebrities like Madonna and Sofia Vergara. Yet his world was shattered when his dark and violent past was revealed. Feature: Michele McPhee
| 46 | 10 | An Inconvenient Murder | Murder of Bonny Lee Bakley | Peter Manso | April 16, 2018 |
A woman is entangled with a brooding leading man and the son of a world-famous actor. When she's found shot to death, investigators wonder: did one of the men she loved murder her? Feature: Dennis McDougal
| 47 | 11 | Silicon Valley Murder Mystery | Ross Ulbricht | Nick Bilton | April 23, 2018 |
From the shadows of the dark web, a dangerous kingpin emerges. Police try to find the man behind the black market website linked to the death of Preston Bridge in Perth. Feature: Andy Greenberg
| 48 | 12 | Love and Obsession | Joy Silverman | Linda Wolfe | April 30, 2018 |
A socialite is terrorized by a sadistic stalker who threatens to kidnap her daughter. She is left wondering about his identity, his motives, and his willingness to carry out his threats.
