= Sportsplay =

Australian TV channel for hotels

- Country: Australia

Programming
- Language: English

History
- Launched: 1985
- Closed: 1987

Sportsplay was an Australian satellite television service.

Operating from 1986 to 1987, Sportsplay was one of the three pioneering Australian subscription television services established following the launch of the AUSSAT satellite system, alongside Club Superstation and Sky Channel.

== History ==
Sportsplay emerged during Australia's first wave of commercial satellite broadcasting, made possible by the launch of the national AUSSAT A1 communications satellite. The company was established in 1985, and regular transmissions from its Sydney studios commenced on 1 December 1986.

Programming consisted largely of harness racing and greyhound racing from around Australia, distributed exclusively to hotels and clubs.

In 1987, Sportsplay attempted to purchase satellite rights for Victorian Football League matches from rightsholder Broadcom, with plans to show in subscribing venues nationwide, outside metropolitan Melbourne. This resulted in a dispute with the VFL and the Victorian Country Football League, with the VFL planning to enforce its existing statewide ban on screening its Saturday afternoon games live on television in Victoria.

This setback with the VFL, along with financial troubles and losing the hotel market share to rivals Sky Channel, saw the station reporting losses of up to $1 million per month in 1987. After a failed attempt to float the company coupled with the stock market crash of 1987, Sportsplay was bought by Alan Bond and Bond Media, and was thus absorbed into Bond's Sky Channel in November 1987.

== See Also ==
- Television broadcasting in Australia
- Sky Channel
- Club Superstation
