= Discovery Home & Health =

Pay television network owned by Discovery

Programming
- Timeshift service: Discovery Home & Health +1

Ownership
- Owner: Warner Bros. Discovery EMEA (UK); Skydance Asia-Pacific (Asia)

History
- Launched: 2000; 26 years ago (Latin America and UK); 2006; 20 years ago (Asia)
- Closed: 31 July 2014; 12 years ago (Asia); 3 November 2014; 11 years ago (Australia); 6 January 2021; 5 years ago (UK)
- Replaced by: Eve (Asia); Discovery Kids (Australia)
- Former names: Discovery Health Channel (2000–2001, Asia and UK; 2000–2005, Latin America); Discovery Health (2001–2005, Asia and UK)

Discovery Home & Health is a television channel owned by Skydance Corporation that features lifestyle programming. Discovery Home & Health is currently available in Latin America, while previously there were variants of channels available in Australia, Republic of Ireland, Hong Kong, Philippines, Indonesia, Thailand and Malaysia.

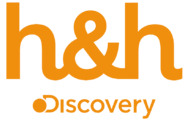
Logo used from 2011 to May 2, 2022

It was formerly available on Australia's SelecTV from March 2007 until the closure of its English service in late 2007, but remained available through Foxtel and Austar. The channel was closed in Australia on 3 November 2014 and replaced with Discovery Kids, with select programming moving to sister channel TLC; Discovery Kids ceased operations on 1 February 2020.
