= Nature's Weirdest Events =

- Genre: Nature documentary
- Directed by: Louise Turner
- Presented by: Chris Packham
- Country of origin: United Kingdom
- No. of series: 5
- No. of episodes: 19

Production
- Running time: 60 minutes
- Production companies: BBC Natural History Unit; BBC Studios (2016–17)

Original release
- Network: BBC Two (2012–17); BBC Two HD (2013–17); BBC HD (2012–13)
- Release: 3 January 2012 – 8 May 2017

Related
- World's Weirdest Events

Nature's Weirdest Events is a 2012 British nature documentary series produced by the BBC and presented by Chris Packham. The show looks at weird events from around the world, with introduced footage typically taken from eyewitnesses before the facts are given. Examples include why some dolphins have taken to breaking people's bones and the case of "spaceballs" in Spain.

The series is broadcast on BBC Two and began in 2012.

== Episodes ==
=== Series 1 ===
Episode No.	Series No.	Broadcast date
1	1	3 January 2012
2	2	4 January 2012

=== Series 2 ===
Episode No.	Series No.	Broadcast date
3	1	1 January 2013
4	2	2 January 2013
5	3	3 January 2013

=== Series 3 ===
Episode No.	Series No.	Broadcast date
6	1	31 December 2013
7	2	1 January 2014
8	3	5 January 2014

=== Series 4 ===
Episode No.	Series No.	Broadcast date
9	1	13 January 2015
10	2	14 January 2015
11	3	15 January 2015

=== Series 5 ===
Episode No.	Series No.	Broadcast date
12	1	29 September 2016
13	2	6 October 2016
14	3	13 October 2016
15	4	20 October 2016
16	5	26 December 2016
17	6	17 April 2017
18	7	24 April 2017
19	8	8 May 2017

== Reception ==
Series four of the show was given a mediocre review by Sam Wollaston of The Guardian, who was unsure whether the swimming pigs of Pig Beach were surprising, and asked "could it be that, having reached series four, they're running out of Weird Natural Events? A resource running low or, less politely, a barrel being scraped?"

== Merchandise ==
=== DVD ===
A single-disc DVD containing the first two episodes of the series was released on 12 March 2012.
