= Sara Nunes =

Finnish pop singer (born 1980)

Sara Nunes (born 1980) is a Finnish pop singer who gained some attention in 2005 after releasing her debut single "Simon Can't Sing" which was a parody of Simon Cowell, the famous American Idol and Pop Idol judge. She and her song achieved some notice in the United States, and charted in her native country, Finland.

== Biography ==
Sara Nunes was born in 1980 in Seinäjoki, Finland, to a Finnish mother and Portuguese father. From her early life she was multicultural; she spent the first nine years of her life in Sweden, then she and her family moved to Africa where she attended a Swedish-speaking school. As a result, she speaks four languages fluently: Finnish, English, Portuguese and Swedish.

Her first real experience in the musical business came at the age of 16 when she fronted the marginally successful band, Sinamour, which she founded with her best friend whom she met during high school, Simone, a native of Jamaica. They were discovered when they sang in a Finnish bus. Sinamour was one of the first Finnish bands who got their video on MTV Nordic. It is known for its small hit "Sync Out".

Now Sara lives in Helsinki and is concentrating on her musical career. She released her album "How to Rule the World in 12 EZ Lessons" on August 3, 2005, only in Finland. The single "Simon Can't Sing" and MTV-Video with Swedish actor Rickard Castefjord was one of the biggest hits of 2005 in Finland getting much airplay outside Finland, too, through MTV Nordic. Her song "Britney Is Still a Virgin" was also recognized, despite not being a single.

On November 27, 2007, she released "How to Rule the World in 12 EZ Lessons" in the United States, on American Royalty Records, and in December 2007 on label TridentStyle/VillageAgain.

From 2008 to 2010, she was married to Jussi Ahde, the son of well-known Finnish politicians.

== Discography ==
- Simon Can't Sing (2005, single)
- How to Rule the World in 12 EZ Lessons (2005, album)
- Bleed (2005, single)
- Dumbitch (2006, single)
