= TLC (Australian TV channel) =

- TLC logo
- Country: Australia
- Broadcast area: Australia & New Zealand

Programming
- Language: English
- Picture format: 576i (SDTV 16:9)
- Timeshift service: TLC+2 (Australia only)

Ownership
- Owner: Skydance Corporation
- Sister channels: 9Rush; Animal Planet; Cartoon Network; CNN International Asia Pacific; Discovery; Discovery Turbo eden HGTV; Investigation Discovery; Living; Rush; Three

History
- Launched: March 2004
- Former names: Discovery Travel & Adventure (before 1 October 2005); Discovery Travel & Living (1 October 2005 – 1 September 2010)

Links
- Website: http://www.ILoveTLC.com/

Availability

Streaming media
- Foxtel Go: Channel 130

TLC, (formerly Discovery Travel & Adventure and Discovery Travel & Living) is an Australian and New Zealand television channel owned by Skydance Corporation. The channel launched in 2004 in Australia and in 2015 in New Zealand. In Australia TLC is available on pay TV provider Foxtel and IPTV provider Fetch, and in New Zealand the channel is available on pay TV provider Sky.

TLC's female-focused programming mainly includes reality series about untraditional lifestyles, weddings, relationships, families and life transformations. True Crime programs on stories of love gone wrong and crimes of passion also feature. The channel broadcasts programs from the US and UK versions of the channel along with Quest Red (UK). Programs on TLC include the hit series 90 Day Fiancé, and its spin-off titles 90 Day Fiancé: The Other Way, 90 Day Fiancé: Happily Ever After? and 90 Day Fiancé: Before the 90 Days; My 600-lb Life, I Am Jazz, Counting On, Little People, Big World and Kate Plus Date.

TLC is home to the popular flagship series Say Yes to the Dress with Randy Fenoli and Say Yes to the Dress UK with David Emanuel. A second UK series called Say Yes to the Dress Lancashire, hosted by celebrity stylist Gok Wan launched in Australia and New Zealand in September 2019. In October 2016 a local version of the franchise, Say Yes to the Dress: Australia launched in both countries and was hosted by Adam Dixon.

In January 2019, the channel aired season one of Dr Pimple Popper, starring YouTube sensation Dr Sandra Lee. It was a 'breakout' hit for the channel and season two launched in July 2019.

Other well-known names to appear on the channel include UK celebrity Katie Price with her series Katie Price: My Crazy Life and Geordie Shore's Vicky Pattison, with the one-hour documentary special Vicky Pattison: The Break Up.

== History ==
The channel launched as Discovery Travel & Adventure in 2004. In October 2005, it rebranded as Discovery Travel & Living, using programming from that branch of Discovery Communications. It was formerly available on SelecTV from March 2007 until the closure of its English service in late 2010. On 1 September 2010, Discovery Travel & Living rebranded as the Travel and Living Channel, or TLC. Unlike the channel TLC in the United States whose acronym originally stood for The Learning Channel, the TLC service in Australia is an acronym for Travel and Living Channel. The channel also converted to 16:9 aspect ratio during the conversion. Over time, it took on programming from the American TLC brand.

On 3 November 2014, TLC's sister channel Discovery Home & Health closed and was replaced with Discovery Kids. As a result, a variety of Home & Health's programming moved to TLC. In addition, Foxtel moved TLC from channel 646 to channel 130, and TLC+2 from channel 647 to channel 166. On 1 September 2015, Sky TV New Zealand launched TLC on Sky 016 as part of a wider reshuffle of Sky Channels Say Yes to the Dress: Australia, an international adaptation of the Say Yes to the Dress format from the United States, featuring couture wedding gown designer Adam Dixon, will become the first local production on the channel when it debuts in 2016.

== See also ==
- TLC (TV network)
