= China from Above =

Television series

- Genre: Documentary; History and geography
- Screenplay by: Chris Williams; Syafiqah Omar
- Directed by: Kenny PNG; Klaus Toft
- Narrated by: Andres Williams
- Countries of origin: United States; China
- Original language: English
- No. of episodes: 4

Production
- Executive producers: Donovan Chan; Andrew Holland; Zhang Yanbin; Ling Li
- Producers: Dixie Chan; Wang Zhanli; Zhang Tianzhu
- Cinematography: Lau Hon Meng
- Editors: Jason Horner; Dipin Verma; Peter Pang
- Running time: 90 minutes
- Production companies: National Geographic Channel; China Intercontinental Communication Center

Original release
- Network: National Geographic Channel
- Release: September 24 – September 25, 2015

China from Above
- Traditional Chinese: 鳥瞰中國
- Simplified Chinese: 鸟瞰中国
Transcriptions
Standard Mandarin
- Hanyu Pinyin: Niǎokàn Zhōngguó

China from Above is a Chinese-American documentary television series premiered on September 24, 2015, on National Geographic Channel. It was produced by National Geographic Channel and the China Intercontinental Communication Center. The broadcast is narrated by Andres Williams. The documentary consists of two episodes, episode one features China's ancient civilization with a fascinating history dating back thousands of years; episode two takes to the air to reveal how modern China lives, eats, works, travels, and plays on a mega scale. "The documentary highlights both modern urban life and traditional rural lifestyles in China. It shows how people interact with their environment, including mountains, rivers, farmland, and cities. The series also illustrates how Chinese communities maintain cultural traditions, adapt to urbanization, and connect daily routines with natural landscapes."

== Episodes ==
No.	Title	Original release date
1	"The Living Past (源远流长)"	September 24, 2015
2	"The Future Is Now (继往开来)"	September 25, 2015
3	"The Dynamic Coast"	TBA
4	"Mountains and Rivers"	TBA
