= Dr. Lisa to the Rescue =

Dr. Lisa to the Rescue is an Australian factual television series. It follows the work of emergency veterinarian Lisa Chimes, rescuing pets from animal rescue shelters, while recommending dogs to families for adoptions based on their specifications and home assessments. Chimes had previously appeared on television series Bondi Vet with veterinarian Chris Brown.

The first season of ten episodes first broadcast 19 September 2015 on the Nine Network. A second season is planned for 2017.
