= My Tiny Terror =

- Genre: Reality
- Country of origin: United States
- Original language: English
- No. of seasons: 1
- No. of episodes: 3

Original release
- Network: Animal Planet
- Release: May 30 – June 14, 2014

My Tiny Terror is an American reality television series premiered on Animal Planet on May 30, 2014. The show features Jacqueline Wilson, a behavioral therapist in Greater Los Angeles, who has trained dogs for over four decades.

It premiered in Australia on April 5, 2015, on the Australian Animal Planet.

== Reception ==
Brad Newsome of The Sydney Morning Herald said of the show, "It's like My Cat from Hell, but with insufferably yappy little dogs."
