= Terror in the Skies =

- Genre: Documentary
- Starring: Brendan Walker (UK version)
- Countries of origin: United Kingdom; United States
- Original language: English
- No. of seasons: 1
- No. of episodes: 4

Production
- Executive producers: Charles Poe; David Royle; Jill Fullerton Smith; Thomas Viner; Tom Brisley
- Running time: 60 minutes (inc. adverts)
- Production company: Arrow Media

Original release
- Network: Channel 4
- Release: June 2013 – July 2013
- Network: Smithsonian Channel
- Release: September 29 – October 20, 2013

Terror in the Skies is a four-part British/American television series that premiered in June 2013 on Channel 4 in the United Kingdom and on September 29, 2013 in the United States on the Smithsonian Channel. The show uses amateur video and photos as well as eyewitness accounts to investigate air disasters and the response to them to make flying safer. The series is produced by British production company Arrow Media for both the Smithsonian Channel and Channel 4.

The show takes different formats on each broadcaster. The British version is hosted by Professor Brendan Walker, while the American version does not feature a host and has a greater focus on user-generated content.

== Episodes ==
No.	Title	Original U.S. release date	U.S. viewers
1	"Pilot Error"	September 29, 2013	N/A
Witness terrifying firsthand footage of pilot error, captured by passengers and newly released cockpit recordings.
2	"Technical Meltdown"	October 6, 2013	N/A
Any plane could experience a technical meltdown at any time. Witness recent flight failures, captured on video by passengers.
3	"Small Mistakes"	October 13, 2013	N/A
See how tiny cracks, tripped circuit breakers, and other small mistakes can lead to catastrophe for flight passengers.
4	"Nature Strikes Back"	October 20, 2013	N/A
It's planes versus nature, from survivor accounts of flying into storms to Captain Sully's tale of landing on the Hudson.

== International broadcast ==
In Australia, the series premiered on pay television on March 23, 2015 on National Geographic Channel and on free-to-air television on May 21, 2015 on the Seven Network.
