= Say Yes to the Dress: Australia =

Australian reality television series

- Genre: Reality
- Country of origin: Australia
- Original language: English
- No. of seasons: 1

Production
- Camera setup: Multiple
- Running time: 22 minutes
- Production company: McAvoy Media

Original release
- Network: TLC
- Release: 26 October 2016

Related
- Say Yes to the Dress

Say Yes to the Dress: Australia is an Australian reality television series on TLC, based on the American format of the same name, which premiered on 26 October 2016. It followed couture wedding gown designer Adam Dixon help brides find their perfect wedding dress while shopping at bridal salons, with the help of a team of specialists. Auditions were opened in May 2016. The program was the first local commission for TLC in Australia.
