= Snake Boss =

- Genre: Reality
- Written by: Mandy Lake
- Directed by: Mandy Lake
- Starring: Julia Baker; Johnny Bagpipes
- Narrated by: Jamie Dunn
- Theme music composer: Joff Bush
- Country of origin: Australia
- Original language: English
- No. of series: 2
- No. of episodes: 20

Production
- Executive producers: Michael Tear; Edwina Thring
- Producers: Margie Brown; Veronica Fury
- Production location: Brisbane

Original release
- Network: Animal Planet
- Release: 5 October 2015 – present

Snake Boss (also known internationally as Snake Sheila) is an Australian television series. It features Brisbane-based snake catcher Julia Baker and her partner Johnny Bagpipes as they attend call-outs to capture and relocate snakes. The 10-part first series premiered on Animal Planet Australia on 5 October 2015. The series is produced by Flickchicks. It is narrated by Jamie Dunn.

The first series was the highest rating program on record for Animal Planet Australia. In April 2016, Snake Boss was renewed for a second series, which began airing on 24 October 2016.
