= 8 Minutes =

American television series

- Genre: Reality
- Presented by: Kevin Brown
- Country of origin: United States
- Original language: English
- No. of seasons: 1
- No. of episodes: 5

Production
- Executive producers: Brad Bishop; Bryan Valderrama; Drew Tappon; Paul Harrison; Sean Gottlieb; Tom Forman
- Camera setup: Multiple
- Running time: 60 minutes
- Production company: Relativity Television

Original release
- Network: A&E
- Release: April 2 – April 30, 2015

8 Minutes is an American reality documentary television series that premiered on April 2, 2015 on A&E. The reality show chronicles ex-police officer Pastor Kevin Brown meeting sex workers and attempting to convince them to quit the profession within eight minutes. The show is executive produced by Tom Forman, who previously worked on another controversial sex-themed reality program Sex Box.

== Reception ==
The show has been controversial for its storytelling, tactics of approaching women with hidden cameras and myths about sex work.

== Cancellation ==
Eight episodes of the program were ordered, however only five have been broadcast in America. In May 2015, A&E announced it was removing the program from its schedule following controversy surrounding the series, and the network isn't planning to air the remaining three episodes, effectively cancelling the series.

== Lawsuit ==
A group of three women who appeared on the show have filed a lawsuit against A+E Television, saying that they got stiffed after agreeing to appear on the series. Some who were part of 8 Minutes also claimed that they were contacted days or weeks ahead of filming, rather than being surprised like it was depicted on the show.

== Episodes ==
No.	Title	Original release date	US viewers (millions)
1	"Welcome to Houston"	April 2, 2015	1.05
2	"Trafficker in the Lobby"	April 9, 2015	0.78
3	"Gorilla Pimped"	April 16, 2015	0.80
4	"Couple Calls"	April 23, 2015	0.58
5	"Two for None"	April 30, 2015	0.49

== Broadcast ==
In Australia, the series premiered on the CI Network on July 6, 2015.
