= Struggle Street =

Television series

- Genre: Documentary
- Directed by: Stuart O'Rourke; Brad Cone; Timothy Joel Green; Dan Schist; Ronan Sharkey; Dani Vos; Mark Hooper
- Narrated by: David Field
- Country of origin: Australia
- Original language: English
- No. of seasons: 3
- No. of episodes: 13

Production
- Executive producers: David Galloway; Leonie Lowe
- Producers: Marc Radomsky; Ash Davies
- Production locations: Season 1; Mount Druitt, Sydney; Season 2; Inala, Queensland; Broadmeadows, Victoria; Seddon, Victoria; Season 3; Wagga Wagga, New South Wales
- Editors: Paul Watling; Alexis Lodge
- Running time: 52 minutes.
- Production companies: Screen Australia; KEO Films Australia

Original release
- Network: SBS One
- Release: 6 May 2015 – 30 October 2019

Struggle Street is an Australian documentary series that first aired on SBS One on 6 May 2015. The second series began airing on 28 November 2017. The third series began airing on 9 October 2019.

== Premise ==
The series sheds light on the struggles and aspirations of residents in public housing areas around Western Sydney; areas which have been commonly associated with high unemployment, drug use and problems with the law.

KEO Films, the production company behind the project stated on their website:

In this proposed 3-part observational documentary series, to be filmed over a 6-month period, we'll feature the voices and stories of people living on the outskirts of Sydney, in some of our most socially-disadvantaged communities.

We'll highlight the enormous challenges they face being born into generational disadvantage, and then being blamed by the system for their lack of progress.

...And rather than being an exercise in voyeurism, or a fleeting judgmental report, this extended insight into the lives of our subjects will – we hope – provoke not just a change in public perception, but a debate about the direction of public policy as well

== Series overview ==
Season	Episodes	Originally aired	
Season	Episodes	Season Premiere	Season Final
1	3	6 May 2015	13 May 2015
2	6	28 November 2017	7 December 2017
3	4	9 October 2019	30 October 2019

== Reception ==
The series received strong criticism from local governments, with the Mayor of Blacktown, Stephen Bali labelling it as 'poverty porn'. Locals attempted to boycott the series by establishing a blockade of garbage trucks outside the SBS headquarters in Artarmon. The series aired as planned, winning its timeslot nationally and was the most watched program on television that night in Sydney, with the controversy claimed for the record ratings.

Western Sydney locals are contemplating legal action against the producers to seek damages for defamation.

SBS chief content officer Helen Kellie defended the program, stating that "We are confident that Struggle Street is a fair and accurate portrayal of events that occurred during filming...further, we believe the series fairly reflects the program description contained in participant release forms".

Several television critics and journalists viewed the show in a positive light, arguing that the outrage and controversy over the program was grossly overstated, and praised the show for bringing light to stories that otherwise wouldn't be told in the public domain.

== Second Season ==
A second season of the show was filmed in Queensland and Victoria, and aired on 28 November 2017.

== Ratings ==
=== Season One (2015) ===
Episode		Original airdate	Overnight Viewers		Consolidated Viewers		Total Viewers	Ref
Episode		Original airdate	Viewers	Rank	Viewers	Rank	Total Viewers	Ref
1	"Episode 1"	6 May 2015	935,000	7	206,000	1	1,141,000	
2	"Episode 2"	13 May 2015	828,000	8	190,000	5	1,018,000	
3	"Episode 3"	13 May 2015	828,000	8	190,000	5	1,018,000	

=== Season Two (2017) ===
Episode		Original airdate	Overnight Viewers		Consolidated Viewers		Total Viewers	Ref
Episode		Original airdate	Viewers	Rank	Viewers	Rank	Total Viewers	Ref
1	"Episode 1"	28 November 2017	304,000	—N/a			304,000	
2	"Episode 2"	29 November 2017	285,000	—N/a			285,000	
3	"Episode 3"	30 November 2017	265,000	—N/a	55,000	20	320,000	
4	"Episode 4"	5 December 2017	220,000	—N/a			220,000	
5	"Episode 5"	6 December 2017	317,000	17	50,000	20	367,000	
6	"Episode 6"	7 December 2017	264,000	—N/a			264,000	
