= X-Ray Mega Airport =

- Title card of X-Ray Mega Airport
- Also known as: Inside Frankfurt Airport
- Genre: Documentary
- Narrated by: Colin Mace
- Country of origin: United Kingdom
- Original language: English
- No. of seasons: 1
- No. of episodes: 5

Production
- Executive producers: Liz Brach; Richard Dale; Sanjay Singhal
- Running time: 60 minutes (inc. adverts)
- Production company: Voltage TV

Original release
- Network: Discovery Channel
- Release: 21 May – 18 June 2015

X-Ray Mega Airport (also known as Inside Frankfurt Airport) is a five-part British television series which premiered on 21 May 2015 on the Discovery Channel in the United Kingdom and subsequently on international versions of the Discovery Channel in more than 220 territories. The program was commissioned by Discovery International in 2014, and is produced by Voltage TV.

The series examines Frankfurt International Airport using CGI, laser scanning technology and thermal cameras to investigate the science and technology behind aviation.

== Episodes ==
| No. | Title | Original release date |
|---|---|---|
| 1 | "Race Against the Clock" | 21 May 2015 |
Discover how every action at a mega-airport is planned to the hour, the minute, and the second. Keeping to such a regimented schedule requires thousands of engineers to race against the clock, twenty-four hours a day.
| 2 | "Total Control" | 28 May 2015 |
Using advanced equipment to x-ray scan the airport, find out how every action is precisely and predictably controlled, including that of the passengers as they enter the terminal, one of the most highly-controlled environments on Earth.
| 3 | "The Airport Never Sleeps" | 4 June 2015 |
Head behind the scenes at one of Europe’s busiest hubs, and discover how an operation the size of Frankfurt never enjoys down-time.
| 4 | "Crossroads of the World" | 11 June 2015 |
Head into the heart of this global mega-airport and explore its vital role in the world’s vast international air network. Flights from five continents land at Germany’s biggest airport every day - a feat only possible due to specialists from seventy countries working together to welcome passengers to the Frankfurt hub.
| 5 | "Failure Is Not An Option" | 18 June 2015 |
The airport’s engineering teams are under pressure, managing specialist technology that they cannot risk to fail. Witness an engine change on an A380 airliner, before finding out the precautions involved in pumping tens of thousands of litres of highly flammable aviation fuel.

== Broadcast ==
In the United Kingdom, the series premiered on the Discovery Channel on 21 May 2015. In Germany, the setting for the program, the series premiered under the title Inside Frankfurt Airport on 26 May 2015 on the German Discovery Channel.

In Australia, the series premiered on 9 June 2015 on the Australian Discovery Channel and was watched by 6,000 viewers overnight and another 10,000 viewers who timeshifted the program within 7 days. It premiered on the English language Southeast Asian feed of Discovery Channel Asia on 24 June 2015. The series premiered in the United States on 3 January 2016 on the Smithsonian Channel to 78,000 viewers.
