= Belief (TV series) =

Oprah Winfrey documentary series

- Genre: Documentary
- Presented by: Oprah Winfrey
- No. of episodes: 7

Original release
- Network: Oprah Winfrey Network; Discovery Network
- Release: October 18 – October 24, 2015

Belief is a seven-part documentary series hosted by Oprah Winfrey which travels across the globe to explore the traditional practices of religion and spirituality such as Christianity, Islam, Hinduism and Atheism. It premiered on October 18, 2015 on the Oprah Winfrey Network and on January 1, 2016 on the Discovery Network. Winfrey's goal with Belief was to tell all types of stories and personal journeys, answering the recurring question of "who am I?". She hoped that viewers would be inspired by the spirituality of the documentary.

== Conception and development ==
Winfrey derived the idea for the series from her own fascination with faith and spirituality, and her desire to inspire viewers to look inside themselves for their own faith, or lack thereof. Winfrey based the aesthetics of Belief off of BBC's Planet Earth, using high-quality cameras and an experienced crew to achieve a very clear, personal documentary.

In early 2016, Tim McGraw released the song "Humble And Kind," whose video contained various footage from the series. This caused Oprah to approve both the song and video, which helped the song become a big hit for McGraw in mid 2016.

== Critical reception ==
Reviews for the series have been favorable overall, praising Winfrey's ability to present all religions without bias. Despite those positive reviews, several websites have criticized the show, saying that Belief didn't ask the real, hard-to-answer questions and failed to answer the question of why faith exists.

== Awards and nominations ==
Year	Award	Category	Result
2016	Gracie Awards	Outstanding Documentary	Won
