= Sky Racing =

- Country: Australia

Programming
- Language: English
- Picture format: 576i (SDTV) 16:9

Ownership
- Owner: Tabcorp
- Sister channels: Sky Racing 2 Sky Thoroughbred Central; Sky International

History
- Launched: 20 October 1986
- Former names: Sky Channel (1986-1998)

Links
- Website: skyracing.com.au

Sky Racing (previously Sky Channel) is an Australian broadcaster primarily telecasting live thoroughbred, harness and greyhound racing. It is owned by Tabcorp and operates a number of television channels and a radio service.

The broadcaster generally telecasts all race meetings that are covered by the various Australian TABs. This includes both metropolitan and country meetings from all Australian states, as well as selected international races from New Zealand, England, Ireland, South Africa, Hong Kong, Singapore, France, the United States and Japan.

== History ==
Following the launch of the Aussat A1 satellite in 1985, several dedicated satellite television channels began operating in Australia distributing content to various hotels, resorts and hospitality centres. Sky Channel began its first transmissions from the studios of STW9 in Perth on 20 October 1986, broadcasting to various hotels across Australia twelve hours a day. Programming consisted of sporting events from around the world with various music and entertainment programmes late at night. At the time, Sky Channel was owned by Alan Bond's Bond Corporation. While the channel's reception was initially mixed by viewers Sky Channel quickly grew to dominate hotel television services, acquiring rival Australian satellite sports channels Club Superstation and Sportsplay in 1987. Sky Channel's studios were relocated to Club Superstation's Sydney location soon after. A pay-per-view boxing channel, Sky Ringside was also introduced, only available exclusively in Sky Channel venues.

In 1998, Sky Channel was acquired by the recently privatised New South Wales TAB, and added a new channel for Australian home subscription television services Foxtel, Austar and Optus Vision called Sky Racing, expanding its availability from hotels to home viewers. In 2004, the NSW TAB holding company, Tab Limited, was in turn was acquired by Tabcorp, thus also placing Sky Channel under Tabcorp ownership.

From 2009, all of Sky's channels were eventually rebranded to Sky Racing with the focus of programming shifted predominantly to 24-hour horse racing and greyhound racing. Sky Racing was split into three main channels; Sky Racing 1, Sky Racing 2 and Sky Racing World, later to be renamed Sky Thourougbred Central in 2015 following the closure of Australian Thoroughbred racing channel TVN.

== Current channels ==
Sky Racing currently operates four separate television channels and one radio channel.

=== Sky Racing 1 ===
Original logo

Original logo

Originally branded Sky Channel, it launched in 1985 as Australia's first nationwide racing channel. It was exclusively available to TAB outlets, sporting venues and clubs until 5 September 1998 when it expanded to direct-to-home subscription TV under the brand Sky Racing. Sky Channel operations were renamed Sky Racing in October 2009.

=== Sky Racing 2 ===
Sky Racing 2 launched on 30 March 2010. It was designed to remove scheduling congestion on Sky Racing and to allow for more local and international race meeting coverage.

=== Sky Thoroughbred Central ===
Launched on 4 May 2010 as Sky Racing World, it was a channel featuring mostly international race meetings and magazine programmes. On 21 March 2015, Sky Racing World was replaced by Sky Throughbred Central, a channel which came at the result of acquiring the rights to broadcast race meetings previously held by TVN. On 1 April 2016, Sky Thoroughbred Central launched a HD simulcast.

=== Sky International ===
This channel delivers select Australian race meetings to international locations including UK, US, New Zealand, Europe and Asia. Extended coverage can be seen on Sky International due to its unique schedule. Content from Sky International can be seen on other racing channels, such as Sky Sports Racing. It is not available domestically.

=== Sky Sports Radio ===
Sky Racing also operates Sky Sports Radio, which is available in most parts of NSW and the ACT via AM and FM transmission. It is also available on digital radio in Sydney. It predominantly covers horse and greyhound racing, however it also has a number of general sporting talk programs.

=== Sky Racing World ===
In North America, Tabcorp operates US subsidiary Sky Racing World, which supplies race vision from a number of countries including Australia (Note: Excluding Australian races where Tabcorp does not hold the international distribution rights. As of 2024, this includes most gallops races in Victoria and South Australia, whose rights are licensed by Racing Victoria. However, Tabcorp hold the rights to distribute the four days of the Melbourne Cup carnival, which are separately licensed by the Victoria Racing Club.), and North American-style past performance data, to advance-deposit wagering (ADW) operators in the US and Canada. Parimutuel betting services are also provided to ADW sites, either via commingling with a host country totalisator, or as separate pools.

Tabcorp acquired the business of former Australian racing vision distributor, Wyvern International, in 2014, and rebranded it to its current name.

== Defunct channels ==
Sky Racing no longer advertises these channel and are presumed defunct.

=== Sky Business TV ===
Sky Racing operated a part-time channel for corporations or businesses wishing to stream live broadcasts, video conferences or meetings via satellite to another location. Sky Racing leased studio space to clients and could use its Sky International bandwidth to deliver content around the world.

=== Sky Ringside ===
Sky Racing also aired Sky Ringside, a pay-per-view channel which featured live boxing tournaments from around the world. This channel was only available to Sky Racing venues.

== Content ==
Other than broadcasting live racing 19 hours per day, Sky Racing produces a number of programmes tailored to specific types of racing in Australia. Most programmes feature expert reviews and tips for upcoming events. Some popular programmes include;

- Formline
- Thoroughbred Preview
- Thoroughbred Weekly
- The Catching Pen
- In The Gig

== Broadcasting ==
Live content is supplied to Sky Racing via fibre optic, microwave or satellite links from independently owned racing clubs. As of August 2006, most live content and all of Sky's flagship programs are broadcast in 16x9 widescreen digital format to all subscribers.

== Mottos ==
- "At home on the track"
- "Power, instinct, heart"
