= The Box (2015 game show) =

- Genre: Cooking Game show
- Presented by: James Martin
- Country of origin: United Kingdom
- Original language: English
- No. of series: 1
- No. of episodes: 25

Production
- Running time: 30 minutes
- Production company: Shine TV

Original release
- Network: BBC One
- Release: 25 May – 26 June 2015

The Box is a BBC cooking game show that aired on BBC One from 25 May to 26 June 2015, and is hosted by James Martin. It follows a two-round format with a celebrity guest to establish a "Cook of the Day".

== International broadcast ==
Internationally, the series premiered in Australia on 16 November 2015, on LifeStyle Food.
