= Murder of Mollie Olgin =

2012 murder in Portland, Texas

- Location: Portland, Texas, U.S.
- Date: June 22, 2012; 14 years ago
- Attack type: Homicide by shooting
- Deaths: Mollie Judith Olgin, 19
- Injuries: Mary Kristene Chapa

Mollie Judith Olgin was a 19-year-old woman murdered on June 22, 2012, in Violet Andrews Park in Portland, Texas, United States, when she and her girlfriend were attacked and shot. The case garnered national attention and sparked outrage among the public, as homophobia was initially suspected to be a motivating factor in the crime.

David Malcolm Strickland was convicted of the crime in 2016. After his conviction, however, a pubic hair found on Chapa's clothing was matched to the original suspect, Dylan Spellman, via mitochondrial DNA testing. To date, Spellman has not been charged with any crime relating to the case.

== The crime ==
On June 23, 2012, birdwatchers at Violet Andrews Park called police after discovering two women's bodies lying below a viewing deck. First responders discovered Mollie Judith Olgin and her girlfriend Mary Kristene Chapa. The women had been sexually assaulted and shot in the head around midnight the previous evening. Olgin was pronounced dead at the scene, while Chapa was taken to a hospital in critical condition. Following intensive care and concerns that the bullet may have left her completely paralyzed, Chapa regained mobility in the right side of her body and helped police create a sketch of the offender.

Due to the attack’s brutal nature, it received heavy media coverage and resulted in public outrage. Vigils were held across the county by the LGBT community, and some suspected the case could be a hate crime.

== Arrest and trial ==
Police were led to David Strickland in 2014 after Chapa's father received an anonymous letter containing information about the crime not released to the public. The letter accused a Layton, Utah, man of the murder of Olgin; police found that the man had an alibi.

The Layton man's home had been burglarized that year by David Strickland, a former friend. When questioned about the letter, the Layton man noted a photo of him included in the letter had been taken by Strickland's wife Laura.

Layton Police investigating the burglary had discovered evidence in Strickland's car, including two guns, ammunition, a suppressor, gloves, and a backpack containing condoms, flex handcuffs, bolt cutters, a knife, and other items. These items were turned over to investigators in the Olgin case.

Police used GPS to discover that David Strickland's cell phone had been near the Chapa home when the letter had been hand delivered.

Other evidence included in the arrest warrant included the fact that a gun in Strickland's possession was matched to bullet casings at the crime scene. Strickland had also inserted himself in the original investigation, talking to investigators and being seen at the crime scene just days after the shooting. A draft of the letter to the Chapa family was found on Strickland's computer.

David Strickland and his wife Laura Strickland were arrested on June 20, 2014, and held at San Patricio County jail. David Strickland was charged with capital murder, aggravated sexual assault, and aggravated assault. Strickland was not charged with a hate crime because authorities found no evidence to indicate the women were targeted due to their sexuality, but were likely random targets.

Laura Strickland was charged with tampering with evidence. The charge was dismissed.

Shortly before trial, George Koumbis, a local gun store owner and the husband of a defense witness, Kiriaki "Kiki" Koumbis, was murdered in his own store in an apparent robbery-gone-wrong. Corpus Christi police concluded that the robbery was targeted. Kiki Koumbis would later testify that she saw Mollie and Kristene as well as Dylan Spellman in Violet Andrews Park in the hours before the murder.

The day before trial, a friend of Strickland's, Mikhail Chavez, was visited by Portland PD Lieutenant Jon Quade and former detective Aaron Veuleman, who had originally charged Strickland with the murder and had been fired from Portland PD months prior. Chavez was on the witness list for the state because of information that he provided in July of 2014, after Strickland's arrest. According to a statement by Chavez, Quade and Veuleman told Chavez that Strickland and his attorneys were planning to shift blame to Chavez during trial and claim that he was the true perpetrator. In his statement, Chavez claims that he knew that the officers were lying to him because he had been in contact with the defense team and notified Portland PD Chief, Mark Cory, of the visit the same day.

On September 28, 2016, a San Patricio County jury found David Strickland guilty of capital murder and aggravated sexual assault. The prosecution did not seek the death penalty and Strickland was sentenced to life imprisonment.

== New DNA evidence ==
In 2018, advances in testing technology allowed for DNA identification of a hair found on Chapa's body. The hair was matched to an initial suspect in the crime, Dylan Spellman, who had recently pleaded guilty to his involvement in an armed robbery in Nevada in which his cohorts and he referred to each other by numbers, mirroring the way Mollie and Kristene were referred to as "number one" and "number two" during their assault. Previously, DNA found on a cigarette butt and energy drink can at the scene both matched to Spellman. Spellman had been staying with his father's best friend just down the street from the scene of the crime. Eyewitnesses also placed Spellman at Violet Andrews Park both before and after the crime.

Attorneys for Strickland filed a motion for his conviction to be overturned based on the newfound DNA evidence, which District Attorney Sam Smith dismissed on an updated episode of Dateline. The appeal was denied in January 2020.

== Aftermath ==
In 2017, Kristene Chapa filed a lawsuit against David Strickland, his father Larry Joe Strickland, and Taft Pharmacy, the family business, seeking $500 million in damages. The complaints against Strickland's father and Taft Pharmacy were later dropped from the lawsuit.

A Change.org petition advocating Strickland's innocence was started by his mother.
