= Racing Victoria =

Horse racing authority in Victoria, Australia

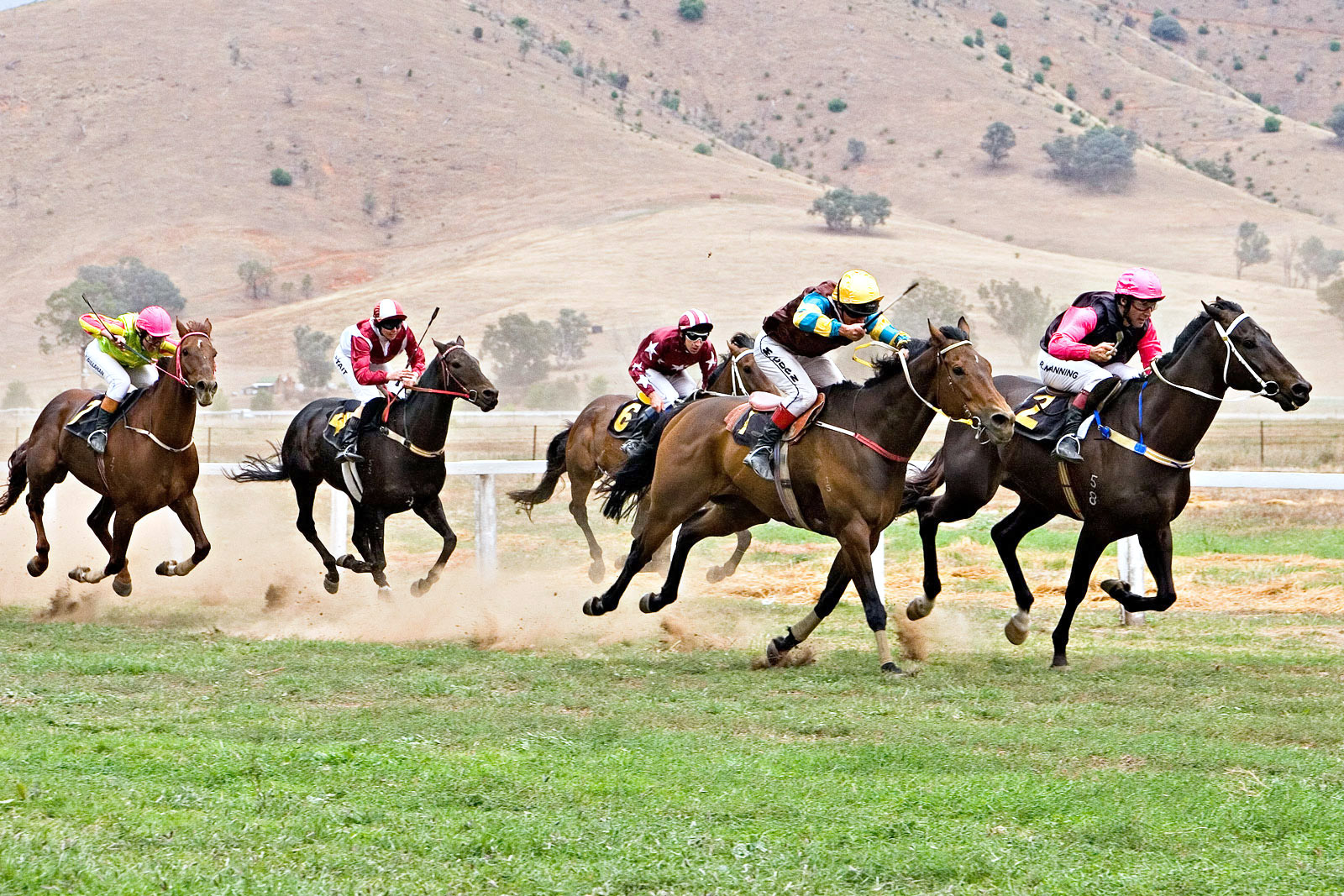
The Swifts Creek Cup at the Tambo Valley Picnic Races, 2006

Racing Victoria Limited, as the governing principal racing authority, has responsibilities to develop, encourage, promote and manage the conduct of Thoroughbred horse racing in the State of Victoria, Australia. It assumed this responsibility, from the Victoria Racing Club, on 19 December 2001.

It was established with the support of Country Racing Victoria, Melbourne Racing Club, Moonee Valley Racing Club, Victoria Racing Club, other racing industry bodies, and the Victorian State Government.

Racing Victoria represents the Victorian Thoroughbred industry in dealings with bodies such as the Australian Racing Board, and is responsible for the marketing of Victorian Thoroughbred racing.

The constitutional objectives of Racing Victoria include:

- Ensuring that race meetings are managed and conducted to the highest integrity.
- Management of revenues, costs, assets and liabilities to optimise economic benefits for Victoria.
- Meeting its social obligations by encouraging responsible wagering and gaming.
- Exercising its powers to ensure public confidence and independence from any improper external influence.

== Incidents ==
In 2009, a promotional event known as the "Midgets Cup" at the Cranbourne Cup attracted criticism from Victorian Minister for Racing Rob Hulls. Racing Victoria marketing director Stuart Laing apologised to anyone offended but described the event as "harmless fun".

== Governance and integrity ==
In October 2025, Racing Victoria chief executive Aaron Morrison rejected allegations by chief veterinarian Grace Forbes, made in a Fair Work Commission application, that she had been pressured to approve international Melbourne Cup runners despite injury concerns. Morrison described the claims as "unsubstantiated".
