= Animal Planet (Australia and New Zealand) =

Australian television channel

- Broadcast area: Australia, New Zealand

Programming
- Language: English
- Picture format: 576i (16:9 SDTV)
- Timeshift service: +2

Ownership
- Owner: Skydance Corporation
- Sister channels: HGTV; Discovery HD; Food Network; TLC

History
- Launched: October 1999; 27 years ago

Animal Planet is a television channel which launched locally in Australia exclusively on Optus Television in October 1999. The channel is dedicated to the U.S. cable television channel, programming that highlights the relationship between humans and animals. It has since expanded to multiple carriers.

It was added to Foxtel on 1 December 2003 in Australia and screen on Sky in New Zealand.

It was formerly available on SelecTV from March 2007 until the closure of its English service in late 2010. It was available on Fetch TV until 1 February 2015. It would later be re-added to the platform on 1 May 2020.

== Programmes ==
- Crikey! It's the Irwins
- Dodo Heroes
- Dr. Jeff: Rocky Mountain Vet
- Jeremy Wade's Dark Waters
- Pit Bulls & Parolees
- Puppy Bowl
- The Aquarium
- The Zoo (2016)
- Evan Goes Wild
- Channel I News
- World Life
- Extinct or Alive
- Scaled
- Secret Life of the Zoo
- Bondi Vet
- Tanked
- Hanging with the Henderson's
- The Vet Life

Animal Planet also hosts some David Attenborough content.
