= 2014 in Australian television =

This is a synoptic list of events and premieres which occurred, in 2014 in Australian television, the 59th year of continuous operation of television in Australia.

== Events ==
- 1 January – Foxtel launches two new subscription channels Syfy and TV Hits, which replace SF and TV1 respectively.
- 31 January – Chris Bath presents her final bulletin for Seven News after deciding to stand down and concentrate on her full-time Sunday Night role. Mark Ferguson replaced her the following Monday (3 February).
- 2 February – The Nine Network's GO! channel unveils a new logo, on-air package and demographic (women 20–40), with a revamped timetable with Kids WB, dropping reality TV catch-up programming which they now air on the Network's primary channel only.
- 13 March – Foxtel launches Presto, an online streaming service allowing subscribers to access content available on Foxtel Movies separate from a full Foxtel subscription.
- 20 March – Showcase wins the Channel of the Year award at the 2014 ASTRA Awards.
- 10 April – Two new subscription channels—Disney XD and Foxtel Movies Disney—launch on the Foxtel platform.
- 6 July – Adam Dovile and Lisa Lamond win the second series of House Rules and New Zealand animated kids show The Barefoot Bandits premieres on Eleven with the voices of Josh Thomson (The Project) as Fridge, Laura Daniel (Jono and Ben) as Riley and Tammy Davis (Outrageous Fortune) as Tane.
- 17 July - John Walton dies (aged 62). Actor of stage, television and film, he was best known as Dr. Craig Rothwell in The Young Doctors.
- 20 July – The Australian Broadcasting Corporation reverts its flagship ABC1 television channel to its former ABC name.
- 21 July – Anja Nissen wins the third season of The Voice.
- 3 August – BBC Worldwide is set to launch a new premium drama and comedy subscription channel known as BBC First which will be available on the Foxtel platform.
- 13 August – Meyne Wyatt becomes the first Indigenous Australian actor in Neighbours' 29-year history to have a leading role when he makes his debut in the soap as Nate Kinski.
- 18 August – The Nine Network secures film rights to revive Paramount Pictures along with DreamWorks, taking them from Network Ten after cost-cutting measures.
- 17 September – Johann Wagner wins the first season of The Recruit and was drafted as a rookie to the Port Adelaide Football Club in the Australian Football League (AFL).
- 28 September – Australia Network is shut down to be replaced by a similar 24-hour television and online service known as Australia Plus Television.
- 1 October – The Antenna Awards are returning to Australian community TV stations.
- 18 November – The Abbott government reduces ABC's annual budget by A$50m, or roughly 5%.
- 21 November – Network Ten revives the Sony Pictures output deal. Erin Brockovich was the first film to air on TEN.
- 25 November – AFL player David Rodan and his partner Melanie Hooper win the fourteenth season of Dancing with the Stars.
- 26 November – Ryan Ginns wins the eleventh and final series of Big Brother.
- 1 December – Network Ten revives the Universal Pictures output deal. Bird on a Wire was the first film to air, but screened on ONE.
- 1 December – The Seven Network wins the ratings year for the eighth consecutive time topping total people, primary channels, reality (My Kitchen Rules, House Rules & The X Factor), breakfast (Sunrise), weekend breakfast (Weekend Sunrise), morning television (The Morning Show), advertisement breaks, news updates, movies, Sport (AFL, Tennis & Melbourne Cup) and suitable only for people over 55, while Nine wins all three demos.
- 7 December - The Seven Network broadcasts Supercars Championship for the final-ever time, before handing the television rights to Fox Sports and Network Ten.

=== Deaths ===
Date	Name	Age	Broadcast notability
14 February	James Condon	90	Actor, scriptwriter and voice artist who appeared in numerous radio and television series, including The Story of Peter Gray and Number 96, he was the husband of Neighbours star Anne Haddy
22 February	Charlotte Dawson	47	Television personality and hostess best known for her role as a judge on Australia's Next Top Model.
26 April	Joan Bruce	86	British-born Australian actress of stage and screen, best known for soap opera Certain Women and voice artist in animated film Dot and the Kangaroo.
30 April	Ian Ross	73,	Television newsreader best known for his roles on Today and Seven News in Sydney.
8 May	Harry Potter	72	Journalist with Network Ten from 1978 to 2010.
27 June	Ian Cook	68	News director.
24 July	Pete Michell	43	Television presenter for Seven Adelaide.
1 August	Michael Johns	35	Singer and reality television participant, who competed in the seventh season of American Idol.
17 September	Elaine Lee	74	South African-born Australian actress best known for soap opera Number 96 as Vera Collins
24 October	Mike Dorsey	83	British-born Australian actor known for Number 96 as Reginald "Daddy" McDonald and The Young Doctorsas Sir Clifford Langley and was also a music tour promotor.
31 December	Coralie Condon	99	Actress, writer, producer, composer and presenter based in Perth and known as "The First Lady of Western Australian Television"

== Premieres ==
=== Domestic series ===
List of domestic television series premieres
Program	Original airdate	Network	Source
Darren Robertson's Charcoal Kitchen	2 January	LifeStyle Food	
Get Ace	19 January	Eleven	
Meet the Frockers	23 January	LifeStyle You	
Coastwatch Oz	30 January	Seven Network	
Hello Birdy	1 February	ABC	
Haunting: Australia	3 February	Syfy	
Hoopla Doopla!	10 February	ABC 4 Kids (ABC2)	
Young, Lazy and Driving Us Crazy	13 February	Seven Network	
Love Child	17 February	Nine Network	
Move It	17 February	GO!	
Fat Tony & Co.	23 February	Nine Network	
The Real Housewives of Melbourne	23 February	Arena	
Inside Story	26 February	Nine Network	
Janet King	27 February	ABC	
Secrets & Lies	3 March	Network Ten	
Lost with the Boys	6 March	Tenplay (online)	
Plonk	11 March	Eleven	
The Face Australia	18 March	Fox8	
The Tipping Points	23 March	NITV	
The Pits	6 April	Network Ten	
Wacky World Beaters	6 April	ABC3	
The Gods of Wheat Street	12 April	ABC	
Crimes that Shook Australia	16 April	Crime & Investigation Network	
Worst Year of My Life, Again	26 April	ABC3	
Jonah from Tonga	2 May (online streaming); 7 May	ABC iview ABC	
The Flamin' Thongs	9 May	ABC3	
Unplanned America	12 May	SBS 2	
Bogan Hunters	13 May	7mate	
When Loves Comes to Town	20 May	Nine Network	
Old School	23 May	ABC	
ManSpace	26 May	GO!	
What Really Happens in Bali	27 May	Seven Network	
Taking on the Chocolate Frog	2 June	Studio	
The Voice Kids	22 June	Nine Network	
The Skinner Boys: Guardians of the Lost Secrets	6 July	GO!	
Kinne	8 July	7mate	
The Call of the Wallaby	15 July	Fox Sports 1	
The Recruit	16 July	Fox8	
Sam Fox: Extreme Adventures	20 July	Eleven	
Village Vets Australia	24 July	The LifeStyle Channel	
Wild Australia	5 August	Nat Geo Wild	
The Dreamhouse	7 August	ABC	
Back Seat Drivers	12 August	ABC2	
Bringing Sexy Back	12 August	Seven Network	
Utopia	13 August	ABC	
The War That Changed Us	19 August	ABC	
Living with the Enemy	3 September	SBS	
Blue Zoo	8 September	ABC3	
Crash Test Mummies & Daddies	10 September	ABC2	
Keneally and Cameron	19 September	Sky News Australia	
SellOut	22 September	7TWO	
Gold Coast Cops	29 September	Network Ten	
The Thursday Night Sport Show	2 October	One	
Party Tricks	6 October	Network Ten	
Fashion Bloggers	15 October	Style Network	
The Big Adventure	19 October	Seven Network	
The Embassy	19 October	Nine Network	
Outback Rangers	1 November	Nat Geo Wild	
Black Comedy	5 November	ABC	

=== International series ===
List of international television series premieres
Program	Original airdate	Network	Country of origin	Source
Bad Education	2 January	ABC2	United Kingdom	
The Moaning of Life	2 January	ABC	United Kingdom	
Pokémon Black & White: Adventures in Unova	5 January	Eleven	Japan	
Falcón	9 January	SBS	United Kingdom	
Beware the Batman	10 January	GO!	United States	
True Detective	13 January	Showcase	United States	
Orphan Black	14 January	SBS 2	Canada	
Agent Anna	15 January	7TWO	New Zealand	
The Michael J. Fox Show	15 January	Universal	United States	
Gok's Summer Catwalk	16 January	LifeStyle You	United Kingdom	
Helix	16 January	Fox8	United States	
Looking	20 January	Showcase	United States	
Robocar Poli	20 January	GO!	Korea	
Pound Puppies (2010)	20 January	Eleven	United States	
Nashville	22 January	SoHo	United States	
Vicious	27 January	7TWO	United Kingdom	
Rabbids Invasion	28 January	Nickelodeon	United States; France	
Tricked	2 February	Seven Network	United Kingdom	
Steven Universe	3 February	Cartoon Network	United States	
Rectify	6 February	SBS	United States	
Grojband	10 February	ABC3	Canada	
Klovn	17 February	SBS	Denmark	
Star-Crossed	18 February	Fox8	United States	
The Tonight Show Starring Jimmy Fallon	18 February	The Comedy Channel	United States	
Cuckoo	19 February	The Comedy Channel	United Kingdom	
Sheriff Callie's Wild West	15 March	Disney Junior	United States; Canada	
King of the Nerds	23 March	Eleven	United States	
Resurrection	25 March	Seven Network	United States	
The Tomorrow People	3 April	Fox8	United States	
Bill's Kitchen: Notting Hill	7 April	The LifeStyle Channel	United Kingdom	
I Didn't Do It	7 April	Disney Channel	United States	
King & Maxwell	8 April	SoHo	United States	
Mom	9 April	Nine Network	United States	
Hugh's Scandimania	10 April	The LifeStyle Channel	United Kingdom	
Mighty Med	11 April	Disney XD	United States	
Hulk and the Agents of S.M.A.S.H.	13 April	Disney XD	United States	
Intelligence	23 April	Seven Network	United States	
The Millers	27 April	Network Ten	United States	
Fargo	1 May	SBS	United States	
Grandma's Boy	5 May	Nat Geo People		
Katie Morag	5 May	CBeebies	United Kingdom	
Locomotion: Dan Snow's Railways	5 May	History	United Kingdom	
Tainted Love	5 May	Bio.	United States	
The Thundermans	5 May	Nickelodeon	United States	
The Tom and Jerry Show	5 May	Cartoon Network	United States	
Uncle Grandpa	5 May	Cartoon Network	United States	
West End Salvage	5 May	LifeStyle Home	United States	
Blonde vs Bear	6 May	Animal Planet	United States	
Building Wild	6 May	National Geographic Channel	United States	
Hook It, Cook It	6 May	Nat Geo People	United Kingdom	
A Season at the Juilliard School	7 May	Studio	United States	
House of Food	7 May	MTV	United States	
The Legacy	7 May	Studio	Denmark	
Nigel Slater's Dish of the Day	7 May	LifeStyle Food	United Kingdom	
Paul Hollywood's Bread	7 May	LifeStyle Food	United Kingdom	
Southern Fried Homicide	7 May	Discovery Channel	United States	
Tickle	7 May	Discovery Channel	United States	
Valentine Warner's Wild Table	7 May	Nat Geo People	United Kingdom	
American Jungle	8 May	A&E	United States	
Genius of Invention	8 May	BBC Knowledge	United Kingdom	
Petrol Age	8 May	Discovery Turbo Max	United Kingdom	
War Hero in My Family	9 May	History	United Kingdom	
24: Live Another Day	12 May	Network Ten	United States	
Dads	18 May	Eleven	United States	
Enlisted	18 May	Eleven	United States	
The Night Shift	29 May	Universal	United States	
The Goldbergs	5 June	Seven Network	United States	
Wander Over Yonder	9 June	Disney XD	United States	
The Tunnel	15 June	ABC	United Kingdom; France	
Autopsy: The Last Hours Of...	26 June	Seven Network	United Kingdom	
From Dusk till Dawn	1 July	SBS 2	United States	
Extant	13 July	Network Ten	United States	
Rachel Allen's Cake Diary	13 July	LifeStyle Food	United Kingdom	
Rake	16 July	Universal	United States	
Sex Box	18 July	SBS 2	United Kingdom	
Broad City	23 July	The Comedy Channel	United States	
Devious Maids	24 July	Universal	United States	
Duck Quacks Don't Echo	26 July	SBS	United Kingdom	
Brooklyn Nine-Nine	28 July	SBS	United States	
The Strain	30 July	Fox8	United States	
Heston's Great British Food	31 July	SBS	United Kingdom	
The Amazing World of Gumball	3 August	GO!	United States; United Kingdom; Ireland	
The Musketeers	3 August	BBC First	United Kingdom	
Every Witch Way	4 August	Nickelodeon	United States	
Witches of East End	4 August	Eleven	United States	
Breathless	5 August	BBC First	United Kingdom	
Reign	5 August	Fox8	United States	
Crisis	5 August	ONE	United States	
The Fear	6 August	BBC First	United Kingdom	
Peaky Blinders	7 August	BBC First	United Kingdom	
Snow, Sex and Suspicious Parents	7 August	ABC2	United Kingdom	
Blandings	8 August	BBC First	United Kingdom	
Hunderby	8 August	BBC First	United Kingdom	
The Village	9 August	BBC First	United Kingdom	
James May's Cars of the People	11 August	BBC Knowledge	United Kingdom	
To Catch a Smuggler	12 August	Nine Network	United States	
Outlander	14 August	SoHo	United States	
Reggie Yates's Extreme South Africa	20 August	ABC2	United Kingdom	
Shetland	20 August	BBC First	Scotland	
The British	22 August	SBS	United Kingdom	
Girl Meets World	25 August	Disney Channel	United States	
Prisoners' Wives	25 August	BBC First	United Kingdom	
Black Sails	26 August	Showcase	United States	
Frisky Business	29 August	SBS 2	United Kingdom	
The Sixties	31 August	SBS	United States	
The 100	4 September	Fox8	United States	
Hidden Kingdoms	8 September	Network Ten	United Kingdom	
Friends with Better Lives	9 September	Eleven	United States	
A Young Doctor's Notebook	14 September	BBC First	United Kingdom	
Faking It	15 September	MTV	United States	
Packages from Planet X	15 September	Disney XD	United States; Canada	
Wanda and the Alien	15 September	Nick Jr.	United Kingdom	
Gracepoint	3 October	MTV	United States	
Star Wars Rebels	3 October	Disney XD	United States	
NCIS: New Orleans	12 October	Network Ten	United States	
Avengers Assemble	12 October	Disney XD	United States	
Gotham	12 October	Nine Network	United States	
Wallykazam	13 October	Nick Jr.	United States	
Breadwinners	1 November	Nickelodeon	United States	
Penny Dreadful	6 November	Showcase	United States; United Kingdom	
Henry Hugglemonster	20 November	7mate	United States; United Kingdom; Ireland	
The 7D	1 December	Disney XD	United States	
The Flash	3 December	Fox8	United States	
The Librarians	9 December	Universal Channel	United States	
The Great British Sewing Bee	15 December	The LifeStyle Channel	United Kingdom	
Hardcore Pawn: Behind the Deal	15 December	A&E	United States	
Made in Chelsea: New York	15 December	LifeStyle You	United Kingdom	
Alaskan Women Looking For Love	16 December	TLC	United States	
Chrome Underground	16 December	Discovery Turbo MAX	United States	
Misfit Garage	16 December	Discovery Turbo MAX	United States	
Cordon	17 December	Studio	Belgium	
Epic Ink	17 December	A&E	United States	
To Catch a Killer	17 December	CI	Canada	
My Crazy Obsession	18 December	LifeStyle You	United States	
BritCam	19 December	CI	United Kingdom	
The Pool Master	20 December	Discovery Channel	United States	
Tornado Alley	21 December	Discovery Science	United States	
Ready for Love	27 December	Seven Network	United States	
Hey Duggee	2014	ABC2	United Kingdom	
Almost Human	Scheduled for 2014 but did not air	Nine Network	United States	
Dead Boss	Scheduled for 2014 but did not air	BBC First	United Kingdom	
How to Live with Your Parents	Unknown	Eleven	United States	
Jimmy's Grow Your Own Christmas Dinner	Unknown	The LifeStyle Channel	United Kingdom	
Marriage Boot Camp: Bridezillas	Unknown	Arena	United States	
The Mysteries of Laura	Scheduled for 2014 but did not air	Nine Network	United States	
Ravenswood	Scheduled for 2014 but did not air	Nine Network	United States	
Stalker	Scheduled for 2014 but did not air	Nine Network	United States	
Troy	Scheduled for 2014 but did not air	Nine Network	United States	
Tyrant	Scheduled for 2014 but did not air	Network Ten	United States	

=== Telemovies and miniseries ===
List of domestic telemovie and miniseries premieres
Program	Original airdate(s)	Network	Source
The Broken Shore	2 February	ABC	
INXS: Never Tear Us Apart	9 and 16 February	Seven Network	
Schapelle	9 February^{[a]}	Nine Network	
The Killing Field	4 May	Seven Network	
Westbrook	28 August; 4 September	CI	
Devil's Playground	9 September	Showcase	

List of international telemovie and miniseries premieres
Program	Original airdate(s)	Network	Country of origin	Source
Bonnie & Clyde	21 and 28 June	SoHo	United States	
Sharknado 2: The Second One	31 July	Syfy	United States	
Burton & Taylor	3 August	BBC First	United Kingdom	
The Politician's Husband	4, 11 and 18 August	BBC First	United Kingdom	
The Ice Cream Girls	25 August	BBC First	United Kingdom	
Love Life	25 August	BBC First	United Kingdom	
Zapped	27 September	Disney Channel	United States	
Lucky Duck	15 November	Disney Junior	United States	
Over the Garden Wall	15 December	Cartoon Network	United States	

=== Documentaries ===
List of domestic television documentary premieres
Program	Original airdate(s)	Network	Source
Life at 9	29 July; 5 August	ABC	
How Australia Changed the World	21 December	Discovery Channel	
88	2014	ABC	
The Flying Miners	2014	ABC	
Outback Choir	2014	ABC	
The Waler: Australia's Great War Horse	2014	ABC	
Who We Are 3	2014	(Foxtel)	
Wizards of Oz	2014	ABC	

List of international television documentary premieres
Program	Original airdate(s)	Network	Country of origin	Source
Green Day's Broadway Idiot	5 May	Max	United States	
Downloaded	17 July	SBS 2	United States	
Smash His Camera	13 August	Bio.	United States	
The Rugby Player	20 August	ABC2	United States	
The Genius of Josiah Wedgwood	25 August	History	United Kingdom	
The Man Behind the Throne	25 August	Studio	Sweden	
Alan Partridge: Welcome to the Places of My Life	29 August	BBC First	United Kingdom	
Dive WWII	15 December	History	United Kingdom	
Love For Sale with Rupert Everett	15 December	Studio	United Kingdom	
Cavedigger	16 December	Studio	United States	
The Children's Odyssey	16 December	History	Germany	
Eastwood Directs: The Untold Story	17 December	Bio.	United States	
Scotland: Rome's Final Frontier	17 December	History	United Kingdom	
Butch Cassidy & the Sundance Kid	19 December	History	Germany	

=== Specials ===
List of domestic television special premieres
Program	Original airdate(s)	Network(s)	Source
A Night with Roger Federer	8 January	Seven Network	
This Is My Australia	17 January	Network Ten	
Tim Minchin: So Live	24 January	The Comedy Channel	
3rd AACTA Awards	30 January	Network Ten	
56th TV Week Logie Awards	27 April	Nine Network	
E. J. Whitten Legends Game	1 July	Nine Network	
Ian Thorpe: The Parkinson Interview	13 July	Network Ten	
50 Years Young	3 August^{[c]}	Network Ten	
Farewell Simply Red	16 August	Smooth	
Target: Style the Nation	30 September	Seven Network	
The 2014 Antenna Awards	1 October	TVS Sydney; C31 Melbourne; 31 Digital Brisbane; 44 Adelaide; WTV Perth	
E! Host Australia Search	2 October	E!	
2014 ARIA Awards	26 November	Network Ten; Eleven	
Apex Teenage Fashion Awards	21 December	Aurora	
Pink: Live in Concert	31 December	Nine Network	

List of international television special premieres
Program	Original airdate(s)	Network(s)	Country of origin	Source
A Grammy Salute to The Beatles	23 February	Arena; Fox8; Max	United States	
Still Open All Hours	25 April	ABC	United Kingdom	
The Year in Pup Culture	5 May	Animal Planet	United States	
2014 MTV Video Music Awards	25 August	MTV	United States	
Tom Kerridge Cooks Christmas	17 December	LifeStyle Food	United Kingdom	
Lorraine Pascale: Fostering & Me	18 December	LifeStyle You	United Kingdom	
Barra MacNeils' Cape Breton Christmas	20 December	Studio	Canada	

== Programming changes ==
=== Changes to network affiliation ===
Criterion for inclusion in the following list is that Australian premiere episodes will air in Australia for the first time on the new network. This includes when a program is moved from a free-to-air network's primary channel to a digital multi-channel, as well as when a program moves between subscription television channels – provided the preceding criterion is met. Ended television series which change networks for repeat broadcasts are not included in the list.

List of domestic television series which changed network affiliation
Program	Date	New network	Previous network	Source
Lotto Draws	1 January	GO! (NSW only)	Nine Network (NSW Only)	
Oz Lotto Draws	1 January	7TWO	Seven Network	
Powerball Draws	1 January	7TWO	Seven Network	
Gold Lotto Draws	1 January	7TWO (Queensland only)	Seven Network (Queensland only)	
Tattslotto Draws	1 January	7TWO (Victoria, South Australia & Tasmania only)	Seven Network (Victoria, South Australia & Tasmania only)	
ABC 4 Kids block programming	3 February	ABC 4 Kids	ABC	
Hi-5 House	24 February	Eleven	Nine Network	
'ABC Education programming	21 July	ABC3	ABC	
Behind The News	22 July	ABC3	ABC	

List of international television programs which changed network affiliation
Program	Date	New network	Previous network	Country of origin	Source
Days of Our Lives	1 April	Arena	Nine Network	United States	
Yu-Gi-Oh!	14 April	GO!	Network Ten	Japan	
The Americans	1 May	SoHo	FX	United States	
Absolutely Fabulous	1 June	GEM	ABC		
Agatha Christie's Poirot	1 July	GEM	ABC		
Midsomer Murders	1 July	GEM	ABC		
Horrid Henry	4 August	Cartoon Network	Boomerang	United Kingdom	
The Fall	Unknown	BBC First	UKTV	Northern Ireland	
The Tom and Jerry Show	1 September	Boomerang	Cartoon Network	United States	
Fairly Odd Parents	2 September	Eleven	ABC	United States	
Heartbeat	8 September	GEM	7TWO	United Kingdom	

=== Subscription premieres ===
This is a list of programs which made their premiere on Australian subscription television that had previously premiered on Australian free-to-air television. Programs may still air on the original free-to-air television network.

List of international television programs which first aired on subscription television
Program	Date	Free-to-air network	Subscription network(s)	Country of origin	Ref
The Tonight Show Starring Jimmy Fallon	24 March	ABC2	The Comedy Channel	United States	
Arrow	3 May	Nine Network	Fox8	United States	
New Tricks	2014	Nine Network; GEM; ABC	BBC First	United Kingdom	

=== Returning programs ===
List of returning domestic television series
Program	Return date	Network	Original run	Ref
Spicks and Specks	5 February	ABC	2005–2011	
So You Think You Can Dance Australia	9 February	Network Ten	2008–2010	
Family Feud	14 July	Network Ten; ONE; Eleven	1977–2006 (intermittently)	
Antenna Awards	1 October	C31 Melbourne	2004–2010	

=== Endings ===
List of domestic television series endings
Program	End date	Network	Start date	Ref
Today Tonight^{[b]}	31 January	Seven Network	1995	
Ten Eyewitness News Early	23 May	Network Ten	2013	
Wake Up	23 May	Network Ten	2013	
Ten Eyewitness News Update	23 May	Network Ten	2013	
Ten Eyewitness News Morning	23 May	Network Ten	2013	
Ten Eyewitness News Late	23 May	Network Ten	2013	
A Place to Call Home	13 July	Seven Network	2013	
The Contrarians	12 September	Sky News Australia	Unknown	
Big Brother	26 November	Nine Network	2001 (Ten); 2012 (Nine)	
At the Movies	9 December	ABC	2004	

== See also ==
- 2014 in Australia
- List of Australian films of 2014

== Notes ==
- ^{a} Schapelle was originally scheduled to air on 10 February before being rescheduled to premiere on 9 February instead due to the impending release of the real-life Schapelle Corby.
- ^{b} Today Tonight was axed in Sydney, Melbourne and Brisbane (East Coast edition), however local versions continued to air in Adelaide and Perth. After TT's demise, Sunday Night became the only current affairs programme on the Seven Network.
- ^{c} 50 Years Young was originally scheduled to air on 8 August before being rescheduled to premiere on 3 August instead.
