= 2012 in Australian television =

This is a list of Australian television events and premieres which occurred, or are scheduled to occur, in 2012, the 57th year of continuous operation of television in Australia.

== Events ==
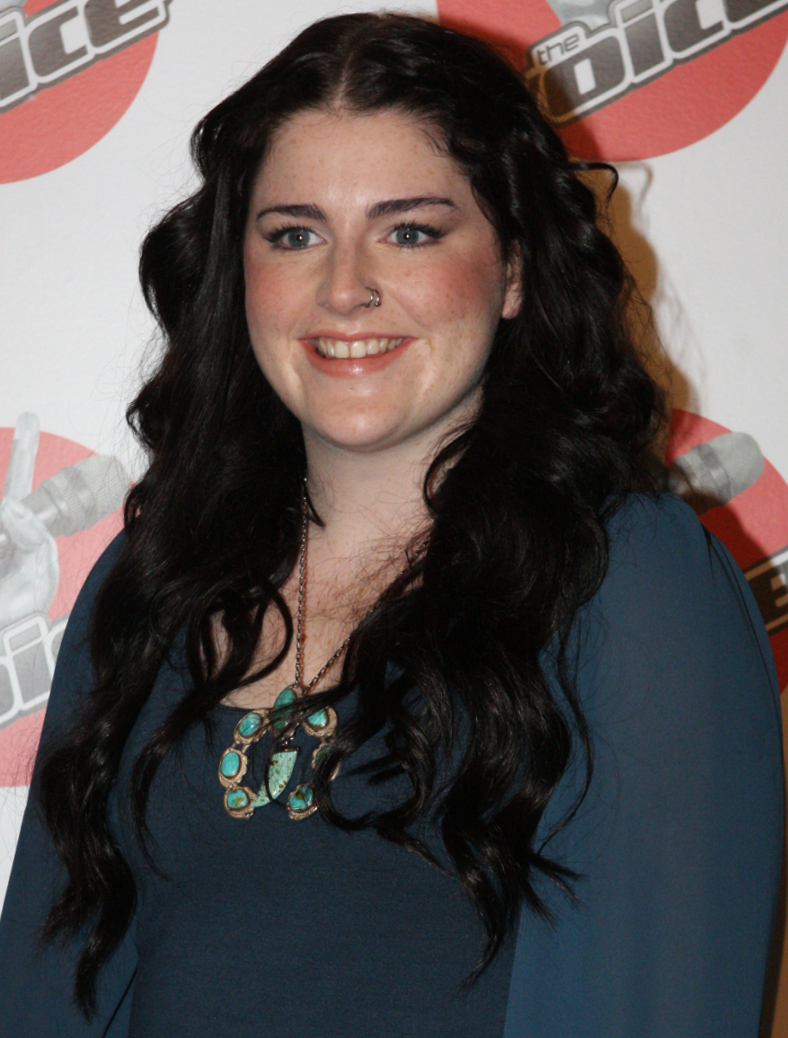
Karise Eden, winner of the first season of The Voice.

- 22 January – Network Ten relaunch Young Talent Time for Sunday nights as part of its Super Sunday lineup. The show was later moved to Friday nights and was cancelled later in the year, due to low ratings.
- 30 January – Nine's Today show launches its closer widescreen package (which adds the "9" Watermark) and slogan "I Wake Up With Today". Mornings launches with Sonia Kruger and David Campbell as hosts. On the same night, Nine's A Current Affair launches its new look and slogan "(city name)'s No.1".
- 27 March – Leigh Sexton and Jennifer Evans win the third season of My Kitchen Rules.
- 29 March – Ajay Rochester and teammate Matthew Palmer win the first series of Excess Baggage.
- 15 April – Hamish Blake wins the Gold Logie Award for Most Popular Personality on Australian Television at the 2012 Logie Awards.
- 22 April – The Nine Network wins its first official ratings week since September 2010, thanks mainly to the launch of The Voice.
- 4 May – Dance group Lil' Banditz Krew win the 2012 version of Young Talent Time, the show was cancelled one month later after a record of low ratings.
- 8 May – Margie Cummins wins the seventh season (the "Singles" edition) of The Biggest Loser.
- 16 May – Music and television personality Ian "Dicko" Dickson wins the second season of The Celebrity Apprentice Australia.
- 23 May – The opening game of the 2012 State of Origin series recorded 2.51 million metropolitan viewers, the highest-rated broadcast of the annual State of Origin series since the introduction of OzTAM ratings in 2001.
- 24 May – Subscription television providers Foxtel and Austar complete a merger transaction of the two companies, with services for customers migrating to one platform as of 1 July.
- 17 June – Singer Johnny Ruffo and his partner Luda Kroitor win the twelfth season of Dancing with the Stars.
- 18 June – Karise Eden wins the first season of The Voice.
- 21 June – Fox Sports wins the ASTRA Award for Channel of the Year at the 2012 ASTRA Awards.
- 30 June – After almost 30 years, Nine drops the US first-run syndicated entertainment television newsmagazine Entertainment Tonight following cutbacks on overseas purchases. Ten subsequently picks up the series.
- 1 July – Brad Cranfield and Lara Welham win the fifth season of The Block with a record profit of $506,000.
- 20 July – The Nine Network has decided not to renew the studio contract with Sony Pictures after 5 years of films and television broadcasting. In 2013, the Seven Network won the licence to its broadcasts.
- 25 July – Andrew De Silva wins the sixth season of Australia's Got Talent; Andy Allen wins the second season of Masterchef Australia.
- 28 July – 13 August – Nine and Foxtel broadcast the 2012 Olympic Games with live coverage on the Nine Network, GEM and Fox Sports from early evening until the following early morning.
- 13 August – Nine Network launch the ninth season of Big Brother Australia which has returned after a 4-year absence after Network Ten axed it in July 2008, hosted by Sonia Kruger.
- 15 August – Police officers Shane Haw and Andrew Thoday win the second season of The Amazing Race Australia.
- 19 August – Callum Hann, runner-up of the second season of MasterChef Australia, wins an All-Stars edition of the cooking program.
- 21 August – The Australian Rugby League Commission announces that the Nine Network and Fox Sports have retained the broadcast rights for rugby league in Australia, with the signing of a A$1.025 billion, five-year deal.
- 15 October – Seven's Melbourne news bulletin records a total of just 192,000 viewers – making it its least-watched bulletin since Christmas Day in 2007.
- 23 October – Mike Snell wins the only series of I Will Survive.
- 7 November – Benjamin Norris wins the ninth season of Big Brother Australia. Norris, the first openly gay person to win the program, proposed to his boyfriend, also named Ben, during the show's live finale.
- 20 November – Samantha Jade wins the fourth season of The X Factor, the first female artist to win the program.
- 22 November – Seven News sports reporter Leith Mulligan is sacked after the bulletin suffers an embarrassing wipeout in the ratings, losing all 40 weeks against the rival Nine News Melbourne.
- 26 November – Ten's Breakfast has its last edition, Ron Wilson leaves Ten after 3 decades, and Matt White leaves Seven's Today Tonight after 4 years.
- 29 November – Millie Lincoln and Chard Oldfield win the fourth season of Beauty and the Geek Australia.
- 8 December – Channel [V] announces Seth Sentry as the winner of its annual viewer-voted title of [V] Oz Artist of the Year.

== Celebrity deaths ==
- 11 March – Ian Turpie (aged 68), host of The New Price Is Right from 1981 to 1986 and again in 1989.
- 20 March – Cliff Neville (age unknown), former 60 Minutes producer.
- 3 May – Edith Bliss (aged 52), reporter for Simon Townsend's Wonder World.
- 18 August – Alan Bateman (aged 76), television writer, producer and executive notable as the creator of Home and Away.

== Channels ==
New channels

- 16 February – A&E
- 17 February – Fox Footy
- 26 February – FX
- 26 March – Extra (Nine Network/NBN Television)
- 1 May – WIN Gold (WIN Television, Channel Nine Adelaide, Channel Nine Perth)
- 24 September – TVSN (Free-to-air)
- 12 December – NITV (re-launched as free-to-air)

Renamed channels

- 1 March – STUDIO (replacing STVDIO)
- 4 May – Gold (replacing WIN Gold) (WIN Television, Channel Nine Adelaide, Channel Nine Perth)
- 20 August – SoHo (replacing W)
- 23 July – SF (replacing Sci-Fi)

== Premieres ==
=== Telemovies ===
Domestic telemovie premieres on Australian television in 2012
Telemovie	Original airdate(s)	Network	Ref
The Last Race	20 February	ABC1	
The Great Mint Swindle	11 March	Nine Network	
Dripping in Chocolate	7 April	UKTV	
Beaconsfield	22 April	Nine Network	
Mabo	10 June	ABC1	
Underground: The Julian Assange Story	7 October	Network Ten	
Dangerous Remedy	4 November	ABC1	
Jack Irish: Bad Debts	14 November	ABC1	
Jack Irish: Black Tide	21 November	ABC1	

International telemovie premieres on Australian television in 2012
Program	Original airdate(s)	Network	Country of origin	Ref
Ben 10: Destroy All Aliens	11 March	Cartoon Network	Singapore; United States	
Hemingway & Gellhorn	12 September	Showcase	United States	

=== Miniseries ===
Domestic miniseries premieres on Australian television in 2012
Miniseries	Original airdate(s)	Network	Ref
Bikie Wars: Brothers in Arms	15 May	Network Ten	
Howzat! Kerry Packer's War	19, 26 August	Nine Network	
Devil's Dust	11, 12 November	ABC1	

International miniseries premieres on Australian television in 2012
Miniseries	Original airdate(s)	Network	Country of origin	Ref
Exile	3, 10, 17 January	UKTV	United Kingdom	
Hogfather	7, 15 January	ABC1	United Kingdom	
World Without End	30 December	SoHo	Germany; Canada	

=== Documentary specials ===
Domestic documentary premieres on Australian television in 2012
Documentary	Original airdate(s)	Network(s)	Ref
Orchids: My Intersex Adventure	29 January	ABC1	
The Real Graham Kennedy	5 February	ABC1	
Geoff Huegill: Be Your Best – Hunt For Gold	15 February	Bio.	
MegaTruckers	16 February	A&E	
The Bombing of Darwin: An Awkward Truth	19 February	The History Channel	
Great Barrier Reef	11, 18, 25 March	Nine Network	
2 Hours	17 March	Seven Network	
Giants	24 March	Seven Network	
Tony Robinson's London Games Unearthed	19 June	The History Channel	
Sporting Nation	24 June	ABC1	
Inside	4, 11 October	Nine Network	
Muddied Waters	9 December	7Two	
Who Makes the News?	10 December	ABC News 24	
George Rrurrambu	TBA	ABC1	
Great Southern Land	TBA	ABC1	
Murdoch	TBA	SBS One	
Possum Wars	TBA	ABC1	
Redesign My Brain	TBA	ABC1	
Sydney Harbour – Life on the Edge	TBA	National Geographic Channel	

International documentary premieres on Australian television in 2012
Documentary	Original airdate(s)	Network(s)	Country of origin	Ref
Missions that Changed the War	3, 10, 17, 24 January	The History Channel	United States	
Les Paul: Chasing Sound	6 January	STVDIO	United States	
Captains of the Final Frontier	13 January	Sci Fi Channel	United States	
Terror Island	17 January	SBS One	Norway	
How the Beatles Rocked the Kremlin	21 January	STUDIO	United Kingdom	
Secrets of Wild India	5, 12, 19 February	Nat Geo Wild	United Kingdom	
Our War – 10 Years in Afghanistan	9, 16, 23 February	BBC Knowledge	United Kingdom	
Jamie: Drag Queen at 16	27 February	LifeStyle You	United Kingdom	
My Gorilla Life	11 March	Nat Geo Wild	Unknown	
No Woman, No Cry	23 March	Discovery Home & Health	United States	
Britain's Youngest Undertaker	18 April	ABC2	United Kingdom	
Under Fire: Journalists in Combat	19 December	SBS One	Canada	

=== Specials ===
Domestic television special premieres on Australian television in 2012
Documentary	Original airdate(s)	Network(s)	Ref
Sydney Festival 2012	7–29 January	STVDIO	
Australia's Great Flood	15 January	National Geographic Channel	
Big Day Out: 20 Years in 20 Days	17 January–5 February	Channel [V]	
An Audience With The Cast of Annie	22 January	Bio.	
Australia Celebrates 2012	25 January	ABC1	
AAA: Summafieldayze	26 January	MTV Australia	
Adam Hills: Inflatable	26 January	ABC1	
Nick Cave: triple J's Tribute	26 January	ABC2	
2011 AACTA Film Awards	31 January	Nine Network	
The Australian Open of Surfing Concerts	17, 18 February	Channel [V]	
G'Day Soleil	18 February	Nine Network	
Movie Extra Tropfest	19 February	Movie Extra	
Meow Meow's Little Match Girl	19 March	STUDIO	
The Premier's Cut: 2011 AFL Grand Final (recall special)	23 March	Fox Footy	
Puppetry of the Penis: Live at the Forum	13 April^{[a]}	One	
2012 All Star Supershow	21 April	Network Ten	
Voices Reaching Out	15 July	Nine Network	
2012 Melbourne Comedy Festival Supershow	5 August	Network Ten	
The X Factor: One Direction to Superstardom	27 September	Seven Network	
Tina Arena: Live in Melbourne	19 November	Studio	
26th Annual ARIA Awards	29 November	Go!	
2012 Walkley Awards	20 November	SBS One	
The People Speak Australia	2 December	The History Channel	
Shark Week	2–8 December	Discovery Channel	
Convoy	8 December	WIN Television	
Kylie 25: 25 Years in 25 Hours	8–9 December	Max	
Celebrity Come Dine With Me Australia	11 December	The LifeStyle Channel	
2012 Asia Pacific Screen Awards	14 December	SBS Two	
The Rolling Stones: One More Shot	16 December	Main Event	
Maggie Beer's Christmas Feast	18 December	ABC1	
Homebake 2012	23 December	Channel [V]	
2012 Carols by Candlelight	24 December	Nine Network	

International television special premieres on Australian television in 2012
Documentary	Original airdate(s)	Network(s)	Country of origin	Ref
Radio 1's Big Weekend 2011	1 January	BBC Knowledge	United Kingdom	
17th Annual Critics' Choice Movie Awards	13 January	Starpics	United States	
Countdown to the Red Carpet: The 2012 Golden Globe Awards	16 January	E!	United States	
Live From the Red Carpet: The 2012 Golden Globe Awards	16 January	E!	United States	
69th Annual Golden Globe Awards	16 January	Fox8	United States	
Jamie Cooks Summer	20 January	Network Ten	United Kingdom	
18th Annual Screen Actors Guild Awards	30 January	TV1	United States	
2012 BAFTA Awards	13 February	Starpics	United Kingdom	
54th Annual Grammy Awards	13 February	Fox8	United States	
Whitney Houston: Last Days of a Legend	17 February	E!	United States	
Whitney Houston Memorial	19 February	E!	United States	
Arizona Republican Presidential Debate	23 February	CNN	United States	
2012 Independent Spirit Awards	26 February	STVDIO	United States	
84th Academy Awards	27 February	Nine Network / Go! Starpics	United States	
Charlie Sheen: Hollywood Black Book	12 March	Bio.	United States	
Aiming for Gold	22 March	CNN	United Kingdom	
Sport Relief 2012	26 March	UKTV	United Kingdom	
One Direction: A Year in the Making	15 May	Go!	United Kingdom	
2012 Billboard Music Awards	21 May	Fox8	United States	
Bee Gees: In Our Own Time	25 May	ABC2	United States	
2011 Royal Variety Performance	29 May	7Two	United Kingdom	
66th Tony Awards	11 June	Bio.	United States	
64th Primetime Emmy Awards	24 September	Fox8; Eleven	United States	
Muppets All-Star Comedy Gala	30 September	Network Ten	Canada	
2012 U.S. Presidential Election: Presidential Debate	4 October	SBS One; ABC News 24	United States	
46th CMA Awards	2 November	Country Music Channel	United States	
The 2012 STYLE Awards	4 November	Style	United States	
2012 Victoria's Secret Fashion Show	9 December	Fox8	United States	
12.12.12 - The Concert for Sandy Relief	13 December	StarPics	United States	

== Programming changes ==
=== Changes to network affiliation ===
This is a list of programs which made their premiere on an Australian television network that had previously premiered on another Australian television network. The networks involved in the switch of allegiances are predominantly both free-to-air networks or both subscription television networks. Programs that have their free-to-air/subscription television premiere, after previously premiering on the opposite platform (free-to air to subscription/subscription to free-to air) are not included. In some cases, programs may still air on the original television network. This occurs predominantly with programs shared between subscription television networks.

Criteria for inclusion:

- Australian premiere episodes are airing on the new network.

Domestic television series which changed network affiliation in 2012
Program	Date	New network	Previous network	Ref
Excess Baggage	13 February	Go!	Nine Network	
After the Bounce	19 February	Fox Footy	Fox Sports	
On the Couch	20 February	Fox Footy	Fox Sports	
Toasted TV	27 February	Eleven	Network Ten	
Lab Rats Challenge	5 March	Seven Network	Nine Network	
Saturday Disney	31 March	7Two	Seven Network	
The Game Plan (NRL)	21 June	Network Ten (NSW and QLD only); One (VIC, SA and WA only)	One	
Big Brother	13 August	Nine Network	Network Ten	

International television series which changed network affiliation in 2012
Program	Date	New network	Previous network	Country of origin	Ref
Charmed	1 January	Eleven	Network Ten	United States	
The Graham Norton Show	14 January	Network Ten	ABC2	United Kingdom	
Modern Family	29 January	Fox8	The Comedy Channel	United States	
Becker	14 February	Eleven	Network Ten	United States	
NYPD Blue	15 February	Eleven	Network Ten	United States	
Ice Road Truckers	16 February	A&E	Fox8	United States	
Dog the Bounty Hunter	16 February	A&E	Fox8	United States	
Ringer	20 February	Eleven	Network Ten	United States	
Pokémon	27 February	Eleven	Network Ten	Japan	
Beyblade: Metal Fusion	27 February	Eleven	Network Ten	Japan	
Bakugan: Gundalian Invaders	27 February	Eleven	Network Ten	Japan	
SpongeBob SquarePants	27 February	Eleven	Network Ten	United States	
Faye Welborn	27 February	Eleven	Network Ten	Australia	
Victorious	27 February	Eleven	Network Ten	United States	
NYPD Blue	27 February	FX	111 Hits	United States	
Las Vegas	27 February	FX	111 Hits	United States	
Dark Angel	27 February	FX	Fox8	United States	
Alias	27 February	FX	W	United States	
Martial Law	27 February	FX	Fox8	United States	
The Shield	27 February	FX	Fox8	United States	
The District	27 February	FX	Sci-Fi	United States	
Arrested Development	29 February	FX	The Comedy Channel	United States	
iCarly	1 March	Eleven	Network Ten	United States	
Penn & Teller: Bulls***!	1 March	FX	Unknown	United States	
Life on Mars	1 March	FX	W	United States	
Hot Wheels Battle Force 5	9 March	Eleven	Network Ten	United States; Canada	
Dr Quinn, Medicine Woman	9 March	Eleven	Network Ten	United States	
Dinosaur King	11 March	Eleven	Network Ten	Japan	
Gormiti	28 March	Eleven	Network Ten	Italy	
Eon Kid	30 March	Eleven	Network Ten	Spain; South Korea	
The Wonder Years	31 March	ABC1	Network Ten	United States	
The Penguins of Madagascar	9 April	Eleven	Network Ten	United States	
Huntik: Secrets & Seekers	9 April	Eleven	Network Ten	Italy	
Chaotic	25 April	Eleven	Network Ten	United States; Canada	
Hero: 108	27 April	Eleven	Network Ten	United States	
Beyblade: Metal Masters	9 May	Eleven	Network Ten	Japan	
Rules of Engagement	15 May	Eleven	Network Ten	United States	
Yu-Gi-Oh! 5D's	17 May	Eleven	Network Ten	Japan	
GoGoRiki	21 May	Eleven	Network Ten	Russia	
The Simpsons	16 June	Network Ten; Eleven	Eleven	United States	
Futurama	16 June	Network Ten; Eleven	Eleven	United States	
The Glee Project	16 June; 23 June (VIC)	Network Ten (Axed after 3 episodes following poor ratings); Eleven	Eleven	United States	
Green Acres	2 July	GEM	Go!	United States	
Bewitched	2 July	GEM	Go!	United States	
I Dream Of Jeannie	3 July	GEM	Go!	United States	
The Voice (season two)	9 July	Nine Network	Go! (season one)	United States	
Vera	18 July	7Two	Seven Network	United Kingdom	
Entertainment Tonight	6 August	Network Ten; Eleven	Nine Network; Go!	United States	
Conan	15 August	Go!	GEM	United States	
The Young and the Restless	20 August	Arena	W	United States	
Family Guy	October	Seven Network; 7mate	7mate	United States	
American Dad!	October	Seven Network; 7mate	7mate	United States	
Sons of Anarchy	11 December	FX	Showcase	United States	
Seinfeld	24 December	7mate	GO!	United States	
Teenage Mutant Ninja Turtles (1987)	2012	Eleven	Seven Network	United States	

=== Free-to-air premieres ===
This is a list of programs which made their premiere on Australian free-to-air television that had previously premiered on Australian subscription television. Programs may still air on the original subscription television network.

International television series that premiered on Australian free-to-air television in 2012
Program	Date	Free-to-air network	Subscription network(s)	Country of origin	Ref
ThunderCats	18 February	Nine Network	Cartoon Network	United States	
Regular Show	12 March	Go!	Cartoon Network	United States	
Team Umizoomi	1 April	Nine Network	Nick Jr.	United States	
Archer	5 June	ABC2	Fox8; FX	United States	
Last Man Standing	10 June	Network Ten	Fox8	United States	
Dollhouse	11 June	Eleven	Fox8	United States	
The Insider	6 August	Network Ten; Eleven	Arena	United States	
Smash	28 August	Seven Network	W.	United States	
Ben 10: Omniverse	6 October	Nine Network	Cartoon Network	United States	
Alphas	7 December	Seven Network	SF	United States	
Hell on Wheels	TBA	ABC2	FX	United States	

=== Subscription premieres ===
This is a list of programs which made their premiere on Australian subscription television that had previously premiered on Australian free-to-air television. Programs may still air on the original free-to-air television network.

International television series that premiered on Australian free-to-air television in 2012
Program	Date	Subscription network(s)	Free-to-air network	Country of origin	Ref
Harry's Law	17 March	Universal Channel	Nine Network	United States	
Bob's Burgers	14 April	The Comedy Channel	Eleven	United States	
Wilfred	June	The Comedy Channel	Eleven	United States	
Pokémon: Black & White	November	Cartoon Network	Network Ten; Eleven	Japan	
American Horror Story	TBA	FX	Eleven	United States	
In the Night Garden...	TBA	CBeebies	ABC4 Kids	United Kingdom	

=== Endings ===
Domestic television series endings on Australian television in 2012
Program	End date	Network(s)	Start date	Ref
Once Upon a Time in Cabramatta	22 January	SBS One	8 January	
Outland	14 March	ABC1	8 February	
Excess Baggage	29 March	Nine Network / Go!	30 January	
Good News Week	28 April	Network Ten	11 February 2008	
The Game Plan (AFL)	14 June	One	23 March 2011	
Tangle	29 April	Showcase	1 October 2009	
Young Talent Time	4 May	Network Ten	22 January 2012	
Letters and Numbers	27 June	SBS One	2 August 2010	
Mandarin News Australia	27 June	SBS Two	24 November 2010	
RPA	18 July	Nine Network	1995	
Tricky Business	25 July	Nine Network	14 May	
The Circle	3 August	Network Ten	1 February 2010	
Everybody Dance Now	19 August	Network Ten	12 August	
The Shire	10 September	Network Ten	16 July	
I Will Survive	23 October	Network Ten	21 August	
Breakfast	30 November	Network Ten	23 February	
Ten Morning News	30 November	Network Ten	6 August	
The Price Is Right	14 December	Seven Network	7 May	
Auction Room	Unknown	ABC1	15 April	
The Marngrook Footy Show	Unknown	ABC2 (since 2010)	2007	
The Playlist	Unknown	Showcase	Unknown	

=== Returns ===
Returning domestic television series on Australian television in 2012
Program	Return date	Network	Original run	Ref
Young Talent Time	22 January	Network Ten	1971–1988	
The Price Is Right	7 May	Seven Network	1963–2005 (intermittently)	
Ten Late News	4 June	Network Ten	1991–2011	
Domestic Blitz	7 July (special)	Nine Network	2008–2010	
Big Brother	13 August	Nine Network / GO!	2001–2008	
Aerobics Oz Style	3 September	Aurora	1982–2005	
The Great Outdoors	23 September	Seven Network	1993–2009	

== Film and television productions ==
=== Big 6 film productions ===
Film Studio	Network	Digital Channels	Pay TV
20th Century Fox	Network Ten	Eleven, One	Showtime movie channels
Paramount Pictures	Network Ten	Eleven, One, GO!, ABC2	Showtime movie channels
Sony Pictures (Columbia, TriStar and Screen Gems)	Nine Network (expires late 2012)	ABC2, 7Two, 7mate GO! (expires late 2012), GEM (expires late 2012)	Showtime movie channels
Universal Pictures	Seven Network	7mate, ABC2	Showtime movie channels
Walt Disney Pictures	Seven Network	7Two, 7mate	Movie Network
Warner Bros.	Nine Network	GO!, GEM	Movie Network

=== Animation film productions ===
Film Studio	Network	Digital Channels	Pay TV
20th Century Fox Animation	Network Ten	Eleven	Showtime movie channels
DreamWorks Animation	Seven Network / Nine Network, (Old films) Network Ten (new films)	7mate, GO! (old films)	Showtime movie channels (New Films) / Movie Network (Old Films)
Nickelodeon Movies	Network Ten	Eleven	Showtime movie channels
Pixar	Seven Network	7Two, 7mate	Movie Network, Disney Channel, Disney Junior
Sony Pictures Animation	Nine Network (expires late 2012)	GO! (expires late 2012)	Showtime movie channels
Universal Animation Studios	Seven Network	7mate	Showtime movie channels
Vanguard Animation	Nine Network	GO!	Showtime movie channels
Walt Disney Animation Studios	Seven Network	7Two, 7mate	Movie Network, Disney Channel, Disney Junior
Warner Bros. Animation	Nine Network	GO!	Movie Network, Cartoon Network

=== Other film productions ===
Film Studio	Network	Digital Channels	Pay TV
DreamWorks	Nine Network, Network Ten	GO!, GEM, Eleven, One	Showtime movie channels (New Films) / Movie Network (Old Films)
Fox Searchlight Pictures	Network Ten	Eleven, One	Showtime movie channels
Lions Gate	Nine Network	GO!, GEM	Showtime movie channels
Metro-Goldwyn-Mayer	Seven Network	ABC2, 7Two, GO!, GEM, Eleven	Movie Network
Miramax Films	Seven Network, Nine Network	7Two, 7mate, GO!, GEM	Movie Network
MTV Films	Nine Network, Network Ten	7mate, GO!, Eleven	Showtime movie channels
New Line Cinemas	Nine Network	GO!, GEM	Movie Network
Regency Enterprises	Nine Network	GO!, GEM	Showtime movie channels
Summit Entertainment	Network Ten	Eleven, One	Showtime movie channels
Touchstone Pictures	Seven Network	7Two, 7mate, GO!	Movie Network
United Artists	Seven Network	7Two, ABC2, GO!, GEM	Movie Network

=== Television productions ===
TV Studio	Primary Network	Digital Channels	Pay TV
20th Century Fox Animation	Network Ten	7mate Eleven	Fox8; The Comedy Channel
20th Century Fox Television	Seven Network (old programs only); Network Ten	7mate Eleven; One	Fox8; 111 Hits; Fox Classics; Arena; The Comedy Channel
4Kids Entertainment	Network Ten	GO! Eleven	Cartoon Network
ABC Studios	Seven Network	7Two; 7mate	Arena; The Comedy Channel; Fox Classics
Cartoon Network Studios	Nine Network	GO!	Cartoon Network
CBeebies originals	ABC1	ABC4 Kids(ABC programs) Extra (BBC Programs)	CBeebies(all programs) Disney Junior (abc for kids programs only)
CBS Studios International	Network Ten	Eleven; One	TV1; SF; 111 Hits; Fox Classics
CBS Television Studios	Nine Network (Old Programs Only); Network Ten	GO! GEM; Eleven; One	TV1; Arena; SF
Comedy Central Cartoons	SBS One	GO!	The Comedy Channel
Disney-ABC Domestic Television	Seven Network	7Two; 7mate	Fox8; Arena; 111 Hits; Fox Classics
Disney Television Animation	Seven Network	7Two; 7mate	Disney Channel
DisneyToon Studios	Seven Network	7Two; 7mate	Disney Channel; Disney Junior
DreamWorks Animation	Network Ten	Eleven	Fox8; The Comedy Channel; Nickelodeon
DreamWorks Television	Seven Network	GO!	Fox8; The Comedy Channel; SoHo
HBO	SBS One	Eleven	Showcase; The Comedy Channel; Arena
Lionsgate Television	Nine Network	GEM; Eleven	Showcase; 111 Hits; Fox Classics; Arena
MTV Animation	Nine Network	GO!	MTV
Nickelodeon Animation Studio	Nine Network (Nick Jr programs); Network Ten (Nick programs)	Eleven	Nickelodeon; Nick Jr.
Ragdoll Productions	Seven Network; Nine Network	ABC4 Kids; ABC3; 7Two; GO! GEM	CBeebies; Disney Junior; Nick Jr
Saban Brands	none	GO!	Nickelodeon
Showtime	Network Ten	Eleven; GEM	Showcase
Sony Pictures Television	Seven Network; Nine Network	7Two; 7mate GO! GEM	TV1; SF
Universal Television	Seven Network	7mate	TV1; SF
Warner Bros. Animation	Nine Network	GO!	Cartoon Network
Warner Bros. Television	Nine Network	7Two; GO! GEM	Fox8; 111 Hits; The Comedy Channel; Arena
Entertainment One Family (eOne Family)	Nine Network	ABC4 Kids	CBeebies

== Notes ==
- ^{a} Puppetry of the Penis: Live at the Forum was originally scheduled to air on 6 April 2012 (Good Friday), but this was changed for unknown reasons to 13 April 2012 instead.
