= List of international television series premieres on Australian television in 2012 =

This is a list of international television programs which first aired on Australian television in 2012. The list is arranged chronological order. Where more than one program premiered on the same date, those programs are listed alphabetically.

== Premieres ==
=== Free-to-air television ===
International television series premieres on Australian free-to-air television in 2012
Program	Original airdate	Network	Country of origin	Ref
Traffic Light	5 January	Network Ten	United States	
Luke Gamble's Vet Adventures	11 January	SBS One	United Kingdom	
Right to the Edge: Sydney to Tokyo by Any Means	11 January	SBS One	United Kingdom	
Kick Buttowski: Suburban Daredevil	15 January	Seven Network	United States	
Accused	21 January	ABC1	United Kingdom	
Homeland	22 January	Network Ten	United States	
New Girl	22 January	Network Ten	United States	
Zen	22 January	ABC1	United Kingdom	
A Gifted Man	26 January	Network Ten	United States	
Green Lantern: The Animated Series	27 January	Go!	United States	
The Marriage Ref	1 February	Seven Network	United States	
Suburgatory	5 February	Go!	United States	
Alcatraz	13 February	Nine Network	United States	
Revenge	13 February	Seven Network	United States	
2 Broke Girls	14 February	Nine Network	United States	
Genius	14 February	ABC1	United Kingdom	
YooHoo & Friends	15 February	ABC3	United States	
Earthflight	16 February	Nine Network	United Kingdom	
Young Justice	18 February	Go!	United States	
ThunderCats	18 February	Nine Network	United States; Japan	
Mike the Knight	20 February	ABC2	Canada; United Kingdom; United States	
Portlandia	23 February	ABC2	United States	
James May's Man Lab	27 February	SBS One	United Kingdom	
Redakai: Conquer the Kairu	27 February	Eleven	Canada; France	
Snog Marry Avoid?	2 March	Eleven	United Kingdom	
Jake and the Never Land Pirates	4 March	Seven Network	United States	
Fry's Planet Word	11 March	ABC1	United Kingdom	
Jim Henson's Pajanimals	12 March	ABC2	United States; United Kingdom	
Regular Show	12 March	Go!	United States	
Bachelor Pad	18 March	Go!	United States	
Property Ladder	29 March	Seven Network	United Kingdom	
Team Umizoomi	1 April	Nine Network	United States	
Voltron Force	8 April	ABC3	United States; Canada	
Flash and Dash	9 April	Go!	China	
Touch	22 April	Network Ten	United States	
Mouk	23 April	ABC2	France	
Missing	1 May	Seven Network	United States	
Silk	3 May	ABC1	United Kingdom	
The Woodlies	5 May	Seven Network	Australia; Belgium; Germany	
Detentionaire	12 May	ABC3	Canada	
Once Upon a Time	15 May	Seven Network	United States	
The Country Mouse and the City Mouse Adventures	27 May	ABC2	Canada; United States; France	
Total Drama: Revenge of the Island	28 May	ABC3	Canada	
Fashion Star	4 June	Eleven	United States	
Archer	5 June	ABC2	United States	
Monsuno	11 June	Go!	United States; Japan	
Life's Too Short	13 June	ABC1	United Kingdom	
Vera	22 June (QLD, NSW)	Seven Network	United Kingdom	
Billy Connolly's Route 66	24 June	Seven Network	United Kingdom	
The Finder	25 June	Network Ten	United States	
Mrs. Brown's Boys	27 June	Seven Network	Ireland; United Kingdom	
Brainiacs	2 July	Go!	United Kingdom	
The Gees	2 July	ABC3	France	
Episodes	3 July	Nine Network	United Kingdom; United States	
Smugglers	4 July	Seven Network	United Kingdom	
Masha and the Bear	6 July	ABC3	Russia	
Fruits Basket	8 July	ABC3	Japan	
The 99	8 July	ABC3	United Kingdom	
Fairly Legal	10 July	Seven Network	United States	
Kioka	19 July	ABC2	France	
Ouran High School Host Club	22 July	ABC3	Japan	
Up All Night	23 July	Seven Network	United States	
Melrose Place	29 July	Eleven	United States	
Countdown	30 July	SBS One	United Kingdom	
The Talk	6 August	Network Ten	United States	
The Block NZ	12 August	Go!	New Zealand	
The Little Prince	19 August	ABC3	France; Italy; Germany; Switzerland	
GCB	20 August	Seven Network	United States	
Gordon Behind Bars	20 August	Nine Network	United Kingdom	
House of Lies	20 August	Network Ten	United States	
Call the Midwife	2 September	ABC1	United Kingdom	
Fish Hooks	2 September	Seven Network	United States	
Fleabag Monkeyface	2 September	ABC3	United Kingdom	
Oreimo	3 September	C31 Melbourne	Japan	
Star Driver	3 September	C31 Melbourne	Japan	
The Bridge	5 September	SBS Two	Denmark; Sweden	
Excused	7 September	Eleven	United States	
Sinbad	8 September	ABC1	United Kingdom	
Puppy in My Pocket: Adventures in Pocketville	11 September	Eleven	Italy	
Trollied	27 September	Network Ten	United Kingdom	
Bubble Guppies	29 September	Nine Network	United States; Canada	
Tilly and Friends	5 October	ABC2	Ireland; United Kingdom	
Ben 10: Omniverse	6 October	Nine Network	United States	
Ben and Kate	8 October	Network Ten	United States	
Are You There, Vodka? It's Me, Chelsea	11 October	Nine Network	United States	
Whitney	11 October	Seven Network	United States	
Scandal	15 October	Seven Network	United States	
I Hate My Teenage Daughter	October	Nine Network	United States	
Strawberry Shortcake's Berry Bitty Adventures	8 November	Eleven	France; United States; Canada	
The Adventures of Abney & Teal	26 November	ABC2	United Kingdom; Canada	
Shangri-La	26 November	C31 Melbourne	Japan	
Wedding Band	5 December	Network Ten	United States	
Maya the Bee	7 December	ABC2	France; Germany	
Peter Rabbit's Christmas Tale	24 December	ABC2	United Kingdom; United States; Ireland; Canada	
Teenage Fairytale Dropouts	31 December	Seven Network	Australia; Mexico	

=== Subscription television ===
International television series premieres on Australian subscription television in 2012
Program	Original airdate	Network	Country of origin	Ref
The Adventures of Chuck and Friends	2 January	Boomerang	United States; Canada	
The Looney Tunes Show	2 January	Cartoon Network	United States	
Dance Moms	3 January	LifeStyle You	United States	
Grimm	4 January	Fox8	United States	
Hart of Dixie	7 January	Fox8	United States	
On the Record	8 January	MTV Classic	United States	
Injustice	10 January	W	United Kingdom	
My Extreme Animal Phobia	11 January	Animal Planet	United States	
Enlightened	15 January	Showcase	United States	
Pawn Queens	17 January	TLC	United States	
Fashion Hunters	24 January	Arena	United States	
Last Man Standing	29 January	Fox8	United States	
Death Valley	31 January	MTV Australia	United States	
Alphas	3 February	Sci Fi Channel	United States	
Disney Art Attack	3 February	Disney Junior	United Kingdom	
ThunderCats	3 February	Cartoon Network	United States; Japan	
John Oliver's New York Stand-Up Show	17 February	The Comedy Channel	United States	
Smash	21 February	W	United States	
The Walking Dead	26 February	FX	United States	
Hell on Wheels	26 February	FX	United States	
Justified	27 February	FX	United States	
Lonely Planet's Year of Adventures	29 February	BBC Knowledge	United Kingdom	
Tamara Ecclestone: Billion $$ Girl	5 March	LifeStyle You	United Kingdom	
Call Me Fitz	7 March	FX	Canada	
Vietnam: Lost Films	7 March	The History Channel	United States	
Work of Art: The Next Great Artist	14 March	STVDIO	United States	
The Queen's Palaces	17 March	BBC Knowledge	United Kingdom	
Luck	18 March	Showcase	United States	
Austin & Ally	18 March	Disney Channel	United States	
Big Law: Deputy Butterbean	22 March	Crime & Investigation Network	United States	
Mad Dogs	25 March	FX	United Kingdom	
Finding Sarah	6 April	Style	United States	
Awake	11 April	W	United States	
Beavis and Butt-head	19 April	MTV	United States	
Tanked	14 May	Animal Planet	United States	
Girls	28 May	Showcase	United States	
Twenty Twelve	11 June	UKTV	United Kingdom	
Veep	24 June	Showcase	United States	
Betty White's Off Their Rockers	3 July	The Comedy Channel	United States	
Boss	11 July	W	United States	
Never Mind the Buzzcocks	16 July	UKTV	United Kingdom	
Stella	23 July	UKTV	United Kingdom	
The Newsroom	20 August	SoHo	United States	
Don't Trust the B— in Apartment 23	3 September	Arena	United States	
666 Park Avenue	1 October	Fox8	United States	
Allen Gregory	November	The Comedy Channel	United States	
Napoleon Dynamite	November	The Comedy Channel	United States	
Bunheads	3 December	Fox8	United States	
Lab Rats	31 December	Disney Channel	United States	
The Annoying Orange	TBA	Cartoon Network	United States	
Beyblade: Metal Fury	TBA	Cartoon Network	Japan	
Bucket & Skinner's Epic Adventures	TBA	Nickelodeon	United States	
Gok’s Clothes Roadshow	TBA	LifeStyle You	United Kingdom	
Gordon the Garden Gnome	TBA	CBeebies	United Kingdom	
How to Rock	TBA	Nickelodeon	United States	
The Jeremy Kyle Show	TBA	LifeStyle You	United Kingdom	
Jo Malone’s High Street Dreams	TBA	The LifeStyle Channel	United Kingdom	
The Last Airbender: Legend of Korra	TBA	Nickelodeon	United States	
The Lying Game	TBA	Fox8	United States	
Phil Spencer: Secret Agent	TBA	The LifeStyle Channel	United Kingdom	
The Secret Circle	TBA	Fox8	United States	
Shipwrecked: The Island	TBA	LifeStyle You	United Kingdom	
Show Me the Monet	TBA	The LifeStyle Channel	United Kingdom	
Superior Interiors with Kelly Hoppen	TBA	The LifeStyle Channel	United Kingdom	
Switched at Birth	TBA	Fox8	United States	
Tickety Toc	TBA	Nick Jr.	United States; United Kingdom; South Korea	
