= List of international television series premieres on Australian television in 2010 =

This is a list of international television series which debuted, or were scheduled to debut, on Australian television in 2010. The list is arranged chronological order. Where more than one program debuted on the same date, those programs are listed alphabetically.

== Premieres ==
=== Free-to-air television ===
Program	Network	Debut date
(United Kingdom) The Old Guys	ABC1	1 January
(United States) Side Order of Life	GO!	7 January
(United Kingdom) Taking the Flak	ABC2	7 January
(United Kingdom) Getting On	ABC1	13 January
(United States) I Survived a Japanese Game Show	7Two	13 January
(United States) Black Panther	ABC3	16 January
(United Kingdom) True Horror	SBS One	17 January
(France) Gazoon	ABC2	28 January
(United States) ATP: World Tour Uncovered	One HD	28 January
(United Kingdom) Ross Noble's Australian Trip	Network Ten	1 February
(United States) Royal Pains	Seven Network	1 February
(United Kingdom) Kevin McCloud's Grand Tour of Europe	ABC1	2 February
(United Kingdom) / (Canada) Thomas & Friends (CGI version)	ABC2	5 February
(Canada) Silverwing	ABC3	6 February
(United States) The Good Wife	Network Ten	7 February
(Canada) Little Mosque on the Prairie	SBS Two	8 February
(United States) The Good Wife	Network Ten	8 February
(Russia) GoGoRiki	Network Ten	10 February
(United States) Cougar Town	Seven Network	11 February
(United Kingdom) The Love of Money	SBS One	14 February
(Spain) Nanigugu	ABC1	15 February
(Denmark) The Killing	SBS One	17 February
(Canada) Total Drama Action	ABC3	18 February
(United States) Important Things with Demetri Martin	ABC1	22 February
(United States) Kings	7Two	24 February
(United Kingdom) James May's Toy Stories	SBS One	26 February
(United Kingdom) Simon Schama's Power of Art	ABC1	28 February
(United States) Ocean Force	Seven Network	1 March
(United Kingdom) Rivers with Griff Rhys Jones	ABC1	2 March
(New Zealand) Beat Squad	Seven Network	3 March
(United States) The Marvelous Misadventures of Flapjack	GO!	7 March
(United States) V	Nine Network	7 March
(United States) Identity	Network Ten	7 March
(United Kingdom) Desperate Romantics	ABC1	7 March
(United Kingdom) The Whistleblowers	7Two	8 March
(United States) Make Me a Supermodel	7Two	10 March
(United Kingdom) The Incredible Human Journey	ABC1	11 March
(United Kingdom) Home Time	ABC2	12 March
(United Kingdom) Criminal Justice	ABC1	12 and 19 March
(United Kingdom) Chuggington Badge Quest	ABC2	16 March
(United Kingdom) Miranda	ABC2	19 March
(United Kingdom) Survivors	Nine Network	21 March
(United States) Community	GO!	23 March
(United Kingdom) The Inbetweeners	GO!	23 March
(United Kingdom) Whitechapel	ABC1	26 March
(United Kingdom) Place of Execution	ABC1	26 March
(United Kingdom) Blood, Sweat and T-shirts	ABC1	7 April
(Canada) Connor Undercover	ABC3	9 April
(United States) Trauma	Seven Network	12 April
(United Kingdom) Daredevils	Seven Network	14 April
(Canada) Busytown Mysteries	ABC2	16 April
(United Kingdom) Ladies of Letters	ABC1	16 April
(Netherlands) Frog & Friends	ABC2	19 April
(New Zealand) Dog Squad	Seven Network	21 April
(United States) The Truth Behind	Seven Network	21 April
(Italy) The Bubbletown Club	7Two	22 April
(United Kingdom) Bonekickers	ABC2	23 April
(United States) Who Do You Think You Are?	Nine Network	28 April
(United Kingdom) Psychoville	ABC1	5 May
(United Kingdom) Dani's House	ABC3	6 May
(United Kingdom) Harry's Mad	7Two	9 May
(France) Manon	ABC2	21 May
(Japan) Bakugan: Gundalian Invaders	Network Ten	28 May
(France) I.N.K. Invisible Network of Kids	ABC3	2 June
(United States) Knight Rider	Seven Two	2 June
(Canada) The Wannabes	ABC3	14 June
(Canada) / (South Korea) Bolts & Blip	ABC3	5 July
(United States) The Secret Saturdays	GO!	10 July
(France) / (China) Shaolin Wuzang	ABC3	16 July
(Italy) Ripples	ABC2	25 July
(United States) Undercover Boss	Network Ten	25 July
(United States) Out of Jimmy's Head	GO!	25 July
(United Kingdom) Life	ABC1	25 July
(Canada) Total Drama World Tour	ABC3	28 July
(France) / (Australia) Sally Bollywood	Seven Network	1 August
(United Kingdom) Driver Dan's Story Train	ABC1	2 August
(United Kingdom) Baroque! From St Peter's to St Paul's	ABC1	17 August
(United States) Human Target	GO!	18 August
(Japan) Blade of the Immortal	ABC2	23 August
(Australia) Jacqui Pix	7Two	23 August
(Canada) Nelly and Caesar	ABC2	30 August
(Canada) Stoked	ABC3	2 September
(Canada) Babar and the Adventures of Badou	ABC2	6 September
(United Kingdom) Hot Pursuit	Nine Network	12 September
(Australia) Gigi Falanga	7mate	25 September
(Australia) Ally Mansell	7mate	26 September
(Australia) Dilara Niriella	7mate	27 September
(United Kingdom) Jinx	ABC3	27 September
(Australia) Charlotte Rose Hamlyn	7mate	2 October
(United Kingdom) Wibbly Pig	ABC1	4 October
(Australia) Sandra Liu	7mate	9 October
(United Kingdom) Luther	ABC1	15 October
(Australia) Rhyah Sheedy	7mate	16 October
(United Kingdom) Hollyoaks	7Two	18 October
(Australia) Sebastian Barkovczy	7mate	23 October
(United Kingdom) / (Kenya) Tinga Tinga Tales	ABC2	27 October
(United States) / (Canada) Hot Wheels Battle Force 5	Network Ten	1 November
(United States) Ben 10: Ultimate Alien	Nine Network	6 November
(Australia) Jye Marshall	7mate	6 November
(Canada) Republic of Doyle	ABC2	6 November
(Japan) Tamagotchi!	GO!	22 November
(Canada) League of Super Evil	ABC3	4 December
(United Kingdom) Bookaboo	ABC2	4 December
(United States) Watchmen: The Motion Comic	GO!	5 December
(United States) Sym-Bionic Titan	GO!	12 December
(United States) Adventure Time	GO!	15 December
(Japan) Pokémon DP: Sinnoh League Victors	Network Ten	19 December
(Australia) Antony Makhlouf	7mate	20 December
(United States) Pink Panther and Pals	ABC1	27 December
(United States) Amne$ia	Nine Network	Still to debut
(United Kingdom) Around the World in 80 Faiths	SBS One	Still to debut
(United States) Big Shots	Nine Network	Still to debut
(United States) Canterbury's Law	Nine Network	Still to debut
(United States) Day One	Seven Network	Still to debut
(United Kingdom) Eastwick	Nine Network	Still to debut
(United States) The Forgotten	Nine Network	Still to debut
(United States) The Goode Family	Seven Network	Still to debut
(United Kingdom) Gordon's Great Escape	Nine Network	Still to debut
(United Kingdom) Gordon Ramsay: Cookalong Live	Nine Network	Still to debut
(United States) Hank	Nine Network	Still to debut
(United States) Jingles	Nine Network	Still to debut
(United Kingdom) The Jo Frost Roadshow	Nine Network	Still to debut
(United States) Jolly Rabbit	ABC2	Still to debut
(United Kingdom) Kevin McCloud's Grand Tour	ABC1	Still to debut
(United Kingdom) Let's Dance for Comic Relief	Nine Network	Still to debut
(United States) The Marriage Ref	Seven Network	Still to debut
(United States) Miami Medical	Nine Network	Still to debut
(United States) My Own Worst Enemy	Seven Network	Still to debut
(United States) October Road	Seven Network	Still to debut
(United States) Opportunity Knocks	Seven Network	Still to debut
(United States) Past Life	Nine Network	Still to debut
(United States) The Philanthropist	Seven Network	Still to debut
(United Kingdom) Rock Rivals	Nine Network	Still to debut
(United States) Romantically Challenged	Nine Network	Still to debut
(United Kingdom) School of Comedy	SBS One	Still to debut
(United Kingdom) Sea Patrol UK	Nine Network	Still to debut
(United Kingdom) Send in the Dogs	Nine Network	Still to debut
(United Kingdom) South Pacific	ABC1	Still to debut
(United Kingdom) The Truth About Food (unaired from 2007)	Nine Network	Still to debut
(United States) The Unusuals	Nine Network	Still to debut

=== Subscription television ===
Program	Channel	Debut date
(United Kingdom) James May's Big Ideas	BBC Knowledge	3 January
(United States) Titan Maximum	The Comedy Channel	6 January
(United Kingdom) / (United States) The No. 1 Ladies' Detective Agency	showcase	6 January
(United Kingdom) How Do You Solve a Problem Like Maria?	UKTV	7 January
(United States) Miami Social	Arena	7 January
(United States) Hitched or Ditched	LifeStyle You	8 January
(United Kingdom) Make My Body Younger	LifeStyle You	11 January
(United Kingdom) The Hairy Bikers' Food Tour of Britain	LifeStyle Food	11 January
(United States) Holly's World	E!	12 January
(United States) NYC Prep	Arena	12 January
(United States) Holidate	LifeStyle You	13 January
(United Kingdom) Rachel Allen Home Cooking	LifeStyle Food	13 January
(United States) The Real Housewives of New Jersey	Arena	19 January
(Canada) Combat School	National Geographic Channel	20 January
(United States) Make It or Break It	Fox8	25 January
(United Kingdom) Mystery Files	National Geographic Channel	1 February
(United States) RuPaul's Drag Race	LifeStyle You	2 February
(United States) Bank of Hollywood	E!	3 February
(United Kingdom) Girl Cops	Bio.	6 February
(United Kingdom) Boys and Girls Alone	The LifeStyle Channel	7 February
(United States) The Jacksons: A Family Dynasty	Arena	8 February
(United States) I Do Diaries	LifeStyle You	12 February
(United States) Party Mamas	LifeStyle You	15 February
(United States) Bored to Death	showcase	16 February
(United States) Chef Academy	Arena	18 February
(United Kingdom) Britain's Dream Homes	The LifeStyle Channel	18 February
(United Kingdom) Bizarre Animal ER	The LifeStyle Channel	19 February
(United States) 10 Years Younger	LifeStyle You	1 March
(United States) Teen Mom	MTV	3 March
(United Kingdom) Dancing on Ice (Series 5)	UKTV	4 March
(United States) Warehouse 13	Sci Fi Channel	5 March
(United States) Glenn Martin, DDS	Fox8	7 March
(United States) Archer	Fox8	7 March
(United States) Is She Really Going Out with Him?	MTV	9 March
(United States) Chelsea Sits Down	E!	14 March
(United Kingdom) Truth About Beauty	LifeStyle You	15 March
(United States) Crash	showcase	16 March
(United States) Addicted to Beauty	LifeStyle You	17 March
(United States) Models of the Runway	Arena	29 March
(United States) Jersey Shore	MTV	30 March
(New Zealand) Girl Racers	FOX8	2 April
(Canada) Eat Yourself Sexy	LifeStyle You	5 April
(United States) Pretty Wild	E!	6 April
(Canada) Mr. Friday	LifeStyle You	9 April
(United States) Jersey Shore: After Hours	MTV	13 April
(United States) Blue Mountain State	MTV	18 April
(United States) That Metal Show	MTV Classic	4 May
(United Kingdom) Father and Son	UKTV	6 May
(United States) Famous Crime Scenes	MTV Classic	8 May
(United States) Paris Hilton's My New BFF	MTV	24 May
(United Kingdom) Any Dream Will Do	UKTV	27 May
(Canada) Peak Season	MTV	31 May
(United States) Hawthorne	Universal Channel	3 July
(United States) Bloodletting & Miraculous Cures	Universal Channel	7 July
(United States) The Price of Beauty	MTV	22 July
(United States) The Dudesons in America	MTV	4 August
(United States) My Life as Liz	MTV	20 August
(United States) The Hard Times of RJ Berger	MTV	9 September
(United States) The Spin Crowd	E!	9 September
(United States) How'd You Get So Rich?	E!	11 September
(United States) Brandy and Ray J: A Family Business	MTV	15 September
(United States) Valemont	MTV	20 September
(Japan) Pokémon DP: Galactic Battles	Cartoon Network	4 October
(United States) / (Singapore) / (Canada) Dinosaur Train	Nick Jr.	Still to debut
(United Kingdom) Everything's Rosie	CBeebies	Still to debut
(United States) Pink Panther and Pals	Cartoon Network	Still to debut
(United States) Adventure Time	Cartoon Network	Still to debut
