= BBC Kids (Australian TV channel) =

Australian children's pay television channel

BBC Kids Australia
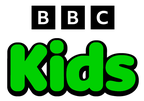
- BBC Kids logo
- Country: Australia

Programming
- Language: English

Ownership
- Owner: BBC Studios
- Sister channels: BBC Brit; BBC Earth; BBC First; BBC UKTV; BBC World News; CBeebies

History
- Launched: April 24, 2021
- Closed: October 31, 2024

Availability

Terrestrial
- Fetch TV: 250

BBC Kids was an Australian pay television channel using the BBC Kids brand, which was exclusive to Telstra's Fetch TV. The channel is aimed at 6 to 10-year-olds and broadcasts comedy, documentaries, drama, entertainment and nature shows that were originally aired on CBBC in the UK.

== History ==
On 30 April 2020, Disney closed their Australian children's channels (Disney Channel and Disney Junior), and Cartoon Network and Boomerang became bound to an exclusive agreement with Foxtel in April 2021. This left Fetch TV with little children's content. In response it commissioned BBC Studios to create a domestic BBC Kids channel.

BBC Kids, along with NickMusic, launched on April 24, 2021. The channel complemented an existing CBeebies channel available in Australia, catering to children aged 0 to 6. On 31 October 2024, it ceased operations along with CBeebies on Fetch.

== Programming ==
The shows that were broadcast on the channel were as follows:

=== Final programming (2021-2024) ===
- Deadly 60 on a Mission
- Horrible Histories
- Jamie Johnson
- Leonardo
- M.I. High
- Project Parent
- Super Human Challenge
- The Dumping Ground
- The Next Step
- The Sarah Jane Adventures
