= List of international specialty programme premieres on Australian television in 2010 =

The following is a list of international specialty television programmes which have debuted, or are scheduled to debut on Australian television in 2010.

== Miniseries ==
Program	Channel	Debut date
(United States) Comanche Moon	showcase	2 January
(United Kingdom) The Diary of Anne Frank	UK.TV	6 January
(United Kingdom) Occupation	UKTV	27 January and 3 February
(United States) The Pacific	Seven Network	14 April
(United Kingdom) Little Devil	ABC1	4 April

== Telemovies ==
Program	Channel	Debut date
(United Kingdom) An Englishman in New York	ABC1	28 March
(United Kingdom) My Boy Jack	Seven Network	unknown
(United States) / (Canada) Manson	SBS One	unknown

== Specials ==
Program	Channel	Debut date
(Austria) 2010 Vienna New Year's Concert 2010	SBS One	1 January
(United Kingdom) 2009 Edinburgh Military Tattoo	ABC1	2 January
(United States) 120th Annual Rose Parade	Seven Network	3 January
(United States) 67th Golden Globe Awards	FOX8	18 January
(United States) Hope for Haiti Now: A Global Benefit for Earthquake Relief	MTV, VH1, CNN, Network Ten (live); National Geographic Channel, E!, Style Network (delayed)	23 January
(United States) 16th Screen Actors Guild Awards	showcase	24 January
(United States) Welcome to the Family	LifeStyle You	27 January
(United Kingdom) Simpsons...Celebrity Friends	Network Ten	31 January
(United States) 52nd Grammy Awards	Arena	1 February
(United Kingdom) Simpsons...Access All Areas	Network Ten	7 February
(United Kingdom) Simpsons...Mischief and Mayhem	Network Ten	14 February
(United Kingdom) "Doctor Who: The End of Time"	ABC1	14 and 21 February
(United States) Ultimate Fighting Championship 110	One	21 February
(United Kingdom) 63rd British Academy Film Awards	Bio.	22 February
(United Kingdom) 2010 BRIT Awards	Channel [V]	25 February
(United States) Making Michael Jackson: This Is It	Nine Network	5 March
(United States) 82nd Academy Awards	Nine Network / Movie Extra	8 March
(United States) Project Runway: All Star Challenge	Arena	22 March
(United States) 2010 Kids' Choice Awards	Nickelodeon	28 March

== Documentaries ==
Program	Channel	Debut date
(United Kingdom) Mighty Ships (HDMS Absalon)	Seven Network	3 January
(United Kingdom) Penguin Adventure with Nigel Marven	ABC1	3 January
(France) Chadar: The Ice Trail	ABC1	5 January
(United States) RiP!: A Remix Manifesto	SBS One	5 January
(United Kingdom) Badgers: Secrets of the Sett	ABC1	10 January
(United Kingdom) Perfect Child Mummies	ABC1	12 January
(United Kingdom) Superspy: The Man Who Betrayed the West	ABC1	12 January
(Canada) The Musical Brain	SBS One	12 January
(United States) The Somali Pirates	National Geographic Channel	17 January
(United Kingdom) Secrets of the Forbidden City	ABC1	18 January
(United Kingdom) Flying the Secret Sky: The Story of the RAF Ferry Command	ABC1	19 January
(United States) Obama's America	SBS One	19 and 26 January
(Canada) Inside the Great Magazines	ABC1	21 January, 28 January and 4 February
(United Kingdom) Killer Whale Islands with Nigel Marven	ABC1	24 January
The Lost Symbol: Truth or Fiction	National Geographic Channel	24 January
Hindenburg	ABC1	25 January
(United States) Thriller In Manila	SBS One	26 January
Secrets to Love	ABC2	27 January
(United States) The Great Wall of China	ABC1	1 February
(United States) Marilyn, Last Sessions	SBS One	2 February
(United Kingdom) Why Are Thin People Not Fat?	SBS One	2 February
(United Kingdom) Snow Monkeys: Who's Hot and Who's Not	ABC1	7 February
(United Kingdom) Generation XXL	SBS One	9 February
(Italy) The Children's Ward	SBS One	9 February
(United Kingdom) Monty Python: Almost the Truth (The Lawyers Cut)	ABC1	14 and 21 February
Frank Sinatra: A Reflection	Bio.	21 February
(United Kingdom) Breaking the Mould: The Story of Penicillin	ABC1	28 February
(United Kingdom) Alesha: Look But Don't Touch	LifeStyle You	1 March
(United Kingdom) Ashes to Diamonds	ABC2	3 March
(United Kingdom) Take a Seat	ABC2	3 March
(United States) Sex: The Revolution	ABC2	3 March
(United Kingdom) Make Me White	LifeStyle You	8 March
(United Kingdom) Super Skinny Me: The Race to Size Double Zero	Seven Network	8 and 15 March
(United States) Titus: The Gorilla King	ABC1	21 March
(United Kingdom) A Boy Called Alex	ABC2	24 March
(United Kingdom) Jamelia: Whose Hair Is It Anyway?	LifeStyle You	25 March
(United Kingdom) The Mountains of the Monsoon	ABC1	28 March
(United States) Out of the Wreckage: Plane Crash Survivors	Seven Network	29 March
(United States) Eye of the Leopard	Seven Network	30 March
(United States) My Monkey Baby	LifeStyle You	6 April
Stress: Portrait of a Killer	ABC1	8 April
(United States) Brace For Impact: Inside The Hudson Plane Crash	Seven Network	14 April
Secrets of Shangri-La: Quest for Sacred Caves	ABC1	15 April
(United Kingdom) Travels with a Tangerine	ABC1	15, 22 and 29 April
(United Kingdom) Space Odyssey: Voyage to the Planets	ABC1	13 May
(United Kingdom) Theatreland	ABC2	10 October
(United States) Tiger Woods: The Rise and Fall	SBS One	22 October
(United States) A Small Act	ABC1	15 November
(United Kingdom) Inside Nature's Giants	SBS One	unknown
(United Kingdom) Iran and the West	SBS One	unknown
Same Sex America	Bio.	unknown
Infinite Space: The Architecture of John Latner	ABC Television	unknown
