= Send In the Dogs =

- Directed by: Steadfast Television Group
- Starring: Nottinghamshire Police; Greater Manchester Police; West Yorkshire Police
- Narrated by: Ken Stott
- Country of origin: United Kingdom
- Original language: English
- No. of seasons: 2
- No. of episodes: 12

Production
- Executive producer: Charles Thompson
- Producers: Patrick Collins and Dominic Longmuir
- Production locations: Nottingham (Series 1–2); Yorkshire (Series 1–2); London (Series 1-2); Manchester (Series 1)
- Production companies: Steadfast Television Group; DCD Media (Series 1)

Original release
- Network: ITV
- Release: 15 July 2008 – 8 September 2009

Related
- Coppers (2010–); Send In the Dogs Australia (Current shows)

Send In the Dogs is a British documentary television series about the work of the Metropolitan Police, Greater Manchester Police, West Yorkshire and British Transport Police's police dogs. The first series of four episodes aired on ITV from 15 July to 5 August 2008. The show was renewed the following year, and a second series of eight episodes aired on ITV from 21 July to 8 September 2009.

Send In The Dogs currently airs on Sky channels Sky One, Sky Witness, Sky Crime and Pick.

== List of Episodes ==
Season 1

Episode 1: Once Bitten, focus on the Metropolitan police

Episode 2: Hide and Seek, focus on West Yorkshire force

Episode 3: On the line, focus on the BTP

Episode 4: To Catch a Killer, focus on West Yorkshire Police

== Related Shows ==
Send In the Dogs Australia
