= Wife Swap Australia =

- Genre: Reality; Dating
- Created by: Stephen Lambert
- Narrated by: Peter O'Brien (2012)
- Country of origin: Australia
- Original language: English
- No. of seasons: 2
- No. of episodes: 16

Production
- Executive producer: Matt Apps
- Production companies: Shine Australia (2012); Screentime (2021)

Original release
- Network: LifeStyle You (2012); Seven Network (2021)
- Release: 9 January 2012 – present

Related
- Wife Swap (British TV series); Wife Swap (American TV series)

Wife Swap Australia is an Australian reality television program based on the British TV format Wife Swap. The show ran for a single season of ten episodes on Lifestyle You from 9 January 2012, and had a second season in 2021 on the Seven Network.

== Season 1 (2012) ==
The original series aired 10 episodes in 2012

No. overall	No. in season	Title	Original release date	Australia viewers
1	1	"Montford and Barry"	9 January 2012	130,000
2	2	"Zantey and King"	16 January 2012	108,000
3	3	"Jackson and Daly"	23 January 2012	115,000
4	4	"Sivkova and Mansell"	30 January 2012	75,000
5	5	"Dedes & Biecker"	6 February 2012	77,000
6	6	"Wilkinson & Matikanen"	13 February 2012	71,000
7	7	"West & Driscoll"	20 February 2012	79,000
8	8	"Clark & Harding"	27 February 2012	N/A
9	9	"Faber & Liggins"	5 March 2012	N/A
10	10	"Kuhn & Marshall"	12 March 2012	N/A

== Season 2 (2021) ==
In October 2018, it was announced that the Seven Network would be reviving the format in 2019. The episodes were filmed in 2019, but broadcast was delayed until February 2021.

No. overall	No. in season	Title	Original release date	Australia viewers
11	1	"Walker & Duncan"	11 February 2021	407,000
12	2	"Andrew & Lister"	18 February 2021	362,000
13	3	"Jackson & Hagar"	25 February 2021	292,000
14	4	"Aravidis & Lange"	4 March 2021	370,000
15	5	"Petersen & Cowles"	11 March 2021	304,000
16	6	"Kevill & Polson"	18 March 2021	172,000 (3 cities)
