= ASTRA Award for Channel of the Year =

- Country: Australia
- Presented by: ASTRA
- First award: 2004
- Final award: present
- Website: www.astraawards.com

The ASTRA Award for Channel of the Year was an award presented at the ASTRA Awards. It was presented at every ASTRA Awards except the first (2003) until its discontinuation in 2015, when ASTRA was absorbed and combined with the annual AACTA Awards.

The award was discontinued after 2015, following the decision by ASTRA to retire its dedicated pay-TV awards and merge its industry recognition into the annual AACTA Awards scheme.

== Overview ==
Most wins
Number of wins	Channel	Years
3	The LifeStyle Channel	2004, 2010, 2011
2	Nickelodeon	2007, 2009
1	Fox Sports	2005
1	Sky News	2006
1	Fox8	2008

== Recipients ==
Year^{[I]}	Channel	Nominees	Ref.
2004	The LifeStyle Channel		
2005	Fox Sports		
2006	Sky News		
2007	Nickelodeon	Fox8; Fox Sports; Sky News	
2008	Fox8	Fox Sports; The History Channel; Nickelodeon; Sky News	
2009	Nickelodeon		
2010	The LifeStyle Channel	Bio.; Fox8; Fox Sports; Nick Jr.	
2011	The LifeStyle Channel	Crime & Investigation Network; Discovery Channel; Fox Sports; Sky News	
2012	Fox Sports		
2013	Fox Footy		
2014	Showcase		

^{^[I]} Each year is linked to the article about the ASTRA Awards held that year.
