= Mandarin News Australia =

- Logo
- Country of origin: Australia
- Original language: Standard Mandarin

Original release
- Network: SBS Two
- Release: 24 November 2010 – 27 June 2012

Mandarin News Australia was a news and current affairs service on the Special Broadcasting Service (SBS) for the Chinese Australian community and the broader Australian audience.

Mandarin News Australia was Australia's first and only free to air, locally produced in-language Mandarin news service. This program delivered relevant news and current affairs to one of Australia's largest language communities and the wider community. The program covered national and international stories, ranging from major political and business news, local Chinese and Australian arts, cultural, community and sports events. The program also featured weekly profile pieces on inspiring locals and successful identities, including Kevin Rudd, Yao Ming, the Dalai Lama, super sleuth Dr Henry Lee, China's academic superstar, Yu Dan and The Sun King: Shi Zhengrong.

The program aired on SBS Two on Wednesdays at 5:30pm with English subtitles, and repeated on SBS One on Sundays at 6.30am. Mandarin News Australia was presented by Zhou Li and Amy Chien-Yu Wang, who also worked as a video journalist on the program. The production team consisted of video journalist, Jason Jin, World News Australia journalist, Cassandra Hill, video producer, Phil Austin and Executive Producer, Liz Deep-Jones.
