= The British (TV series) =

2012 British television series

The British is a British television series produced by Sky Atlantic. It comprises seven fifty-minute episodes. It covers several major events in the history of Britain throughout the years 43 AD to 1953. Including the Norman Conquest, Industrial Revolution and the Queen's Coronation. It stars Russell Brand, Jessie J, and Dame Helen Mirren, and is narrated by Jeremy Irons. It premiered 6 September 2012 on Sky Atlantic.

== Episodes ==

=== Episode 1, Treasure Islands ===
The episode opens in the year 58 AD, depicting a Roman party being ambushed by Britons in a forest located in Wales. General Gaius Suetonius Paulinus is shown landing on a British coast followed by a Roman fleet. The documentary then displays the reasons for a Roman invasion including the abundance of Cornish tin and its market and a large amount of iron for use in Rome's armies, and other useful metals. It moves on to show the ancient druids inhabiting Anglesey as the largest resistance against the Roman Invasion. The druids are shown training to fight the Roman invasion with men and women both fighting alongside each other. Lindow Man is shown, a preserved male body found in a bog at Lindow Moss, thought to have been a ritual sacrifice made by the druids in order help defeat the Roman forces. The Romans then approach the druids at Anglesey and a battle takes place which resulted in a Roman victory. The documentary then shows the effects of Roman rule in Britain, showing the roads that are built and the settlements along them as well as bathhouses and temples. The arenas are then shown with enslaved gladiators fighting within them. The gladiators are treated as celebrities and have a following. A sale of a gladiator's sweat is made showing the market for sporting merchandise. A gladiatorial battle is shown in which the fate of the loser is decided by the battles host, in this instance, death is desired.

The north of England is explored as a major food source for the Roman empire, and elaborate villas are constructed with central heating and functional sewers. Hadrian's Wall is shown, separating England from Scotland. The Picts attack the Roman soldiers at Hadrian's Wall and are successful. The Roman Empire is challenged throughout Europe, and in the UK, markets slow and no new coins are sent to Britain. Rome then withdraws from Britain. A man is shown burying his wealth, hoping to protect it for the future on the hopes the Roman empire will return to Britain.

The emperor Constantine the Great is shown dying, with his dying wish to be baptised, making the Roman empire a Christian one. A man named Patrick is seen at a coastal settlement, and is kidnapped and enslaved by Irish pirates. He escapes slavery and spreads Christianity throughout Ireland and later becomes Saint Patrick. He and his followers spread Christianity into Great Britain from Ireland.

=== Episode 2, People Power ===
The episode opens in 1066 with William the Conqueror taking the throne after the death of King Harold. A town in north Yorkshire is shown resisting the new rule, refusing the Normans right to rule. Norman men are sent north to suppress resistance with force if necessary. The inhabitants of the town are slaughtered. 150,000 people died or fled during these slaughters. Their land is torched. Norman influence is shown, with structures such as forts and castles built around Britain. The Normans claim land from Britons, taking it from private owners. To demonstrate ownership and make taxing more efficient, Domesday Book is written recording every person living in Britain and everything they own. Effects of this are seen in investments such as large cathedrals and their architecture is described. Payne Peverel, the third son of a Norman lord, is shown preparing for a war: the Crusades. A battle is shown in Jerusalem where Normans massacre inhabitants in search for personal gain. Payne Peverel is made a baron due to his success as a crusader.

In 1315, one of Britain's worst storm halves crop yield and half a million die as a result. Thus, the price of crops increase driving many to hunt illegally. Two hunters are shown hunting in royal forests, a criminal offence. It is noted that all men must be skilled bowmen ready to fight for their king if called upon. The hunters are shown being chased by the king's foresters and are caught and arrested and spared due to their skills in archery. This sparks the legend of Robin Hood.

A merchant ship is shown carrying black rats carrying the black death on its way to Britain. The village of Titchfield is depicted and is inhabited by these black rats. The black death soon sweeps through the village and three-quarters die within six months. This is seen throughout most villages in Britain. In London, mass graves were used to preserve the dignity of the dead.

Due to the lowered population, there is a food excess which is sold for profit which creates a new middle class and a more prosperous nation. A baker is shown being demanded more tax from their lords and subsequently a resistance occurs; the peasants' revolt. The rebels then prepare to march on London. Robert Hales is shown, treasurer responsible for the new tax, being beheaded by a small party of peasants. Serfdom is ended, but the rebel leaders are executed. Archers are shown preparing to fight French forces whom have double the number of soldiers as the British on the battlefield. The longbow allows the British to become victorious due to the ranged advantage and the high rate of fire.

=== Episode 3, Revolution ===
This episode takes viewers from the Tudors and the Stuarts right through to the parliamentary revolution. The episode opens in 1539, at Glastonbury Abbey, during the Dissolution of the Monasteries in England. A lieutenant of Henry VIII of England has arrived to loot and to uncover evidence of high treason, on orders of the King. Instances such as this started happening due to Henry VIII's recent divorce, resulting in England becoming a Protestant country. Henry VIII's outright defiance of the papacy at this time caused outrage in Catholic Europe. This episode explores how technological advancements, such as the Caxton Press defined Henry VIII's reign, and how, ultimately, all this led to the English Civil War and the subsequent downfall of Charles I. This episode featured an appearance from Russell Brand.

=== Episode 4, Dirty Money ===
This episode explores how money shaped the transformation of modern Britain. The episode opens with historian Jeremy Black explaining the rise of English coffeehouses in the 17th and 18th centuries. Beginning in 1666, this is where the upper classes gathered and discussed culture, news and gossip of the day. The beginnings of these coffeehouses ties in with the Great Fire of London, which is also discussed in this episode. A time jump of almost 60 years occurs to the formation of the Bank of England, which brought about British Colonization and the Atlantic slave trade, which leads to the abolition of slavery and the Battle of Trafalgar fought between England and Napoleon Bonaparte's French Empire. This episode features appearances from Frank Lampard, Jeremy Irons and Terry Wogan.

=== Episode 5, Superpower ===
This episode highlights how the British Empire expanded by way of exploration, including how colonies were established and developed in Australia. It also highlights how the Industrial Revolution propelled Britain into a new age with technological advancements. Manual processes were replaced with machinery to improve production efficiency, boosting the economy. The episode begins with Captain James Cook coming across the shores of New South Wales but takes a contrasting turn and lands the viewer straight in the middle of the Industrial Revolution. The episode also portrays how these advancements caused devastation when it explores one of the bloodiest conflicts in history, The Crimean War. This episode features multiple guest stars including Tracey Emin, Dougary Scott, Jessie J and Lily Cole.

=== Episode 6, Tale of Two Cities ===
This episode concentrates on the events of the period from 1851 to 1891. With Queen Victoria on the throne the Empire is ever expanding; however, at home divisions in society are becoming deeper. The wealth and opulence enjoyed by some in society is deeply contrasted with the experiences of those blighted by poverty and crime. Some great reformers emerged in this time, including Charles Dickens and Josephine Butler. London is thriving and The Crystal Palace is constructed to host the Great Exhibition of 1851. On a lighter note the episode takes a look at the rise and popularity of football.

=== Episode 7, War and Peace ===
This episode talks about the coronation of Queen Elizabeth II which took place in 1953. Live, on black and white TVs, 27 million British people watched the coronation from their homes. This was the first coronation to be broadcast. This important event took almost twelve months to organise and required extensive negotiations to allow cameras inside the abbey. The Prime Minister, Winston Churchill, and the cabinet believed that the intrusion of cameras and lights would be an extra discomfort for the Queen and also a threat to the dignity of the ceremony. However, listening to people's desire, Elizabeth II requested that the whole nation could see the coronation.
