= Inside Story (Australian TV program) =

2014–2016 Australian TV series

- Genre: Current affairs
- Presented by: Leila McKinnon
- Country of origin: Australia
- Original language: English
- No. of seasons: 3
- No. of episodes: 17

Production
- Production locations: Sydney, New South Wales; Brisbane, Queensland (special)
- Running time: 60 minutes (approx., including commercials).

Original release
- Network: Nine Network
- Release: 26 February 2014 – 3 March 2016

Inside Story was an Australian current affairs television program airing weekly on the Nine Network. The program is hosted by Leila McKinnon and commenced on 26 February 2014. It screens Wednesday evenings normally at 8.45pm (Series 1) and Thursdays at 8:40 (Series 2) and 7:30 (Series 3).

The series investigates major crimes and related stories in Australia and elsewhere with a view to unveiling previously unreported/under-reported stories. Reporters include Alicia Loxley, Tom Steinfort, Peter Stefanovic, Deborah Knight, Jayne Azzopardi and Brett McLeod

On 31 March 2014, the show was renewed for a second season.

In response to Gerard Baden-Clay being found guilty of murdering his wife Allison, a special edition of the program titled Inside Story: Baden-Clay aired live-to-air on 15 July 2014 hosted by Tracy Grimshaw and Karl Stefanovic. In December 2015 the charge against Baden-Clay was downgraded to manslaughter.

== Episodes ==
=== Series 1 - True Crimes (2014) ===
Episode		Journalist(s)	Original airdate	Viewers (in millions)
1	"Crocodile Tears"	Leila McKinnon	26 February 2014	1.081
Description
This episode exposes the crying killers who tearfully appealed to the public ... while trying to get away with murder.
2	"Fatal Females"	Alicia Loxley	5 March 2014	0.736
Description
In the movies, they’re the femme fatale. Sultry and seductive – luring hapless men to their doom. As Alicia Loxley discovers this week, these fatal females exist in real life too …where they can be just as seductive, and even more ruthless.
3	"Lethal Lovers"	Leila McKinnon	12 March 2014	0.894
Description
A shocking story of sex, greed, and crazy obsession. How two husbands were betrayed - two families shattered - by scheming wives and their lethal lovers.
4	"Teen Killers"	Tom Steinfort	19 March 2014	0.771
Description
The teenagers who turned into monsters. We reveal the shocking video confession of a teenager who’s just killed two girls. And the compelling and confronting case of a 14-year-old who wrote a story about murdering his mum – and then did it.
5	"Twisted Minds"	Peter Stefanovic	26 March 2014 (NSW and QLD)	—N/a
Description
A chilling insight into the lives and crimes of some of the world’s most dangerous psychopaths. Be prepared for a surprise as the experts reveal psychopaths aren’t all cold-blooded killers. They’re all around us.
6	"Killer in the Family"	Tom Steinfort	2 April 2014	0.752
Description
It began as a mystery – who killed the likeable Jeff Ryan - shot dead in the middle of the night. What police discover shocks even the most hardened investigators. Three women, driven by lust, revenge and greed, are behind the contract killing.

=== Specials ===
Episode		Journalist(s)	Original airdate	Viewers (in millions)
1	"The Mystery of Flight MH370"	Leila McKinnon	19 March 2014	0.934
2	"The Bladerunner"	Peter Stefanovic and Tom Steinfort	26 March 2014	0.759
3	"Baden-Clay"	Tracy Grimshaw and Karl Stefanovic	15 July 2014	—N/a

=== Series 2 (2015) ===
Episode		Journalist(s)	Original airdate	Timeslot	Viewers (in millions)
1	"No Limits"	Leila McKinnon	2 July 2015	Thursday 8:40	0.699
Description
The heartwarming story of Aussie John Coutis. Born with only half a body, he's become an inspiration to millions worldwide and along the way found love with a truly wonderful woman.
2	"Perfect Stranger"	Leila McKinnon	9 July 2015	Thursday 7:30	0.564
Description
A teenage girl's Facebook dream becomes a nightmare after she falls in love with a serial online predator who sets about destroying her confidence, her reputation and her life.
3	"Road to Happiness"	Leila McKinnon	16 July 2015	Thursday 7:30	0.641
Description
The celebrity couple who gave up their high-flying, red carpet lifestyle for the simple life, travelling the world in a humble van with their young daughter.
4	"The Good Doctor"	Leila McKinnon	23 July 2015	Thursday 7:30	0.659
Description
The pulse-racing life and times of Dr Gordian Fulde, the inspirational surgeon who helped clean up Australia's sin capital, Kings Cross
5	"Mother Knows Best"	Leila McKinnon	6 August 2015	Thursday 7:30	0.557
Description
The outspoken Aussie mum whose extreme views on raising children, like breastfeeding her six-year-old daughter, have sparked international controversy.

=== Series 3 (2016) ===
Episode		Journalist(s)	Original airdate	Timeslot	Viewers (in millions)
1	"Walking Free"	Leila McKinnon	4 February 2016	Thursday 7:30	0.561
Description
How could Arnold Schwartzenegger possibly inspire a 12-year-old boy to become one of the world’s great orthopedic surgeons? A good question. And just one of many intriguing twists in the life of Dr Munjed Al Muderis.
2	"True Believers"	Leila McKinnon	11 February 2016	Thursday 7:30	0.508
Description
It all began in an old school hall in Sydney’s Hills district. Now, it’s a global enterprise … earning a fortune every year … preaching to millions every week. And, largely, it’s the vision of two people - Brian and Bobbie Houston.
3	"The Snake; Charmer"	Leila McKinnon	18 February 2016	Thursday 7:30	0.481
Description
If you grew up thinking the only good snake is a dead one … you’re in for a shock. A shock in the form of a human tornado named Julia Baker. A Harley-riding, mother of two. A former pastry cook and puppeteer, whose life took a wild turn 11 years ago.
4	"The Real Me"	Leila McKinnon	25 February 2016	Thursday 7:30	0.644
Description
He was born a boy, but Ethan always knew he was really a girl. From the moment he could crawl, he liked to dress up and play with his sister’s dolls. His parents thought it was a childish phase … he’d grow out of it … but Ethan’s obsession only grew.
5	"Costa Conchordia"	Leila McKinnon	3 March 2016	Thursday 7:30	0.277+
Description
It was a night of a sickening crash. The lights go out, the ship shudders, and the lies begin. On board the Costa Concordia it’s pandemonium. Every man, woman and child for themselves. Among them are 23 Australians, all fighting for their lives. Through perseverance, bravery and sheer good luck, most of the passengers escape in the lifeboats. But hundreds did get trapped onboard, and there’s another act of bastardry from the captain still to come.

+Melbourne, Adelaide & Perth
