= Unplanned America =

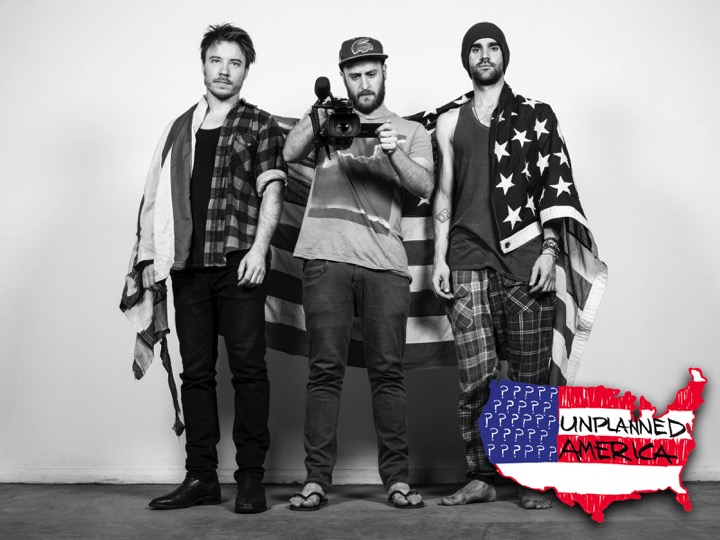
- Genre: Documentary, Travel, Culture
- Created by: Pawel Jarecki, Tim 'Gonzo' Ryan, Nick Maher
- Presented by: Pawel Jarecki, Tim 'Gonzo' Ryan, Nick Maher
- Original language: English
- No. of seasons: 3 x 6 episodes

Production
- Production location: America
- Production company: Unplanned America

Original release
- Network: SBS Two
- Release: May 2014

Unplanned America is a gonzo television documentary series about three Australians, Pawel Jarecki, Tim 'Gonzo' Ryan and Nick Maher, who travel across America without a plan, other than to embark new adventures encountering as many unique individuals as possible. Driving an unreliable ’99 Camry with 300,000 kilometres on the odometer they hit the road to discover the real America. The trio placed their fate in the hands of the strangers they encountered along the way, in the hope of discovering a side of America that hadn’t been uncovered in backpacker travel guides.

== History ==
In 2012 Gonzo, Parv and Nick travelled to the States in the search of the most unique, challenging and inspiring societies that the "land of the free" had to offer. On a shoestring budget, funded by the three producers themselves, they travelled for six months throughout the USA, driving through more than 35 states and clocking up more than 20,000 miles. They filmed stories all over the country in places as varied as the mountains of Colorado, the Californian desert, Detroit’s urban wasteland, islands off the southern tip of Texas, the rainy city of Seattle, the mean streets of south Chicago and under the bright lights of NYC.

== Episodes ==
=== Season One 2014 ===
#	Title	Broadcast	Synopsis
1.1	"When Fantasy Meets Reality"	12 May	Gonzo, Nick and Parv make their way to Seattle where they go on street patrol with the Rain City Superheroes, to learn the motivations behind the masked vigilantes much ridiculed actions. Later the guys pay a visit to the Real Doll factory in southern California, where frighteningly lifelike sex dolls are made to order for discerning customers.
1.2	"Family Matters"	12 May	Nick, Gonzo and Parv head to southern Illinois to attend the lawless Gathering of The Juggalos music festival for notorious fans of horror-core hip-hop group Insane Clown Posse. From the Gathering the boys head east to New York City to dive headfirst into the gay, African-American/Latino underground ballroom dance scene.
1.3	"The Boyz In The Hood"	19 May	With Kanye West’s former manager John Monopoly as their guide Nick, Gonzo and Parv find themselves on the dangerous streets of south-side Chicago, where they discover that music is the only way to escape the ghettos for many of the young rappers who are the face of the burgeoning Chicago rap scene.
1.4	"Inhibition and Exhibition"	19 May	The boys are thrown in to the deep-end of the LA porn scene as they are invited on to the set of Austin Powers XXX for three days. In contrast with this fantasy world, the boys then find themselves in the midst of a 10,000-strong nude bike ride in Portland where the human body in all its various shapes and sizes is celebrated.
1.5	"Waking Up From The American Dream"	26 May	In Detroit, Gonzo, Parv and Nick find a city that appears to be on the brink of extinction, but are soon inspired by the proud locals who are rejuvenating the city. Later in the episode, while on a journey through the California Desert, they discover Slab City, an off-the-grid community of misfits, artists, drug addicts and hippies who have shied away from mainstream society to create their own self-governed, self-styled, community. This off-the-grid wonderland is a safe haven for squatters and unconventional snowbirds.
1.6	"On The Road"	26 May	Parv and Gonzo hit up spring break, hang out with UFO chasers, take a look at rockabilly culture in Las Vegas, attend a tailgate, pimp their car and do shots over a cryogenically frozen corpse

=== Season Two 2015 ===
In the six-part second season, Gonzo, Nick and Parv will find themselves in the infamous Portland Strip club scene, get their first marijuana license, eat a 20,000 calorie burger at the Heart Attack Grill in Las Vegas, get tattooed at the US’s most iconic tattoo shop, meet gangsters removing their tattoos and a whole lot more.

== Theme Song ==
The Unplanned America theme song is performed by Nick Nuisance & The Delinquents from Petersham in Sydney. The song is entitled 'Solar'.
