= The Big Adventure =

- Genre: Reality competition
- Presented by: Jason Dundas
- Country of origin: Australia
- Original language: English
- No. of seasons: 1
- No. of episodes: 10

Production
- Running time: 50–65 minutes

Original release
- Network: Seven Network
- Release: 19 October – 25 November 2014

The Big Adventure is an Australian reality television series that premiered on the Seven Network on 19 October 2014, and is hosted by Jason Dundas.

== Show details ==
Set on a tropical island, a cast of twelve contestants competed for A$1,000,000. A grid of 25 squares was set up, 12 of which contained keys. Contestants competed in a series of tasks for the right to dig for a key. In each episode, one contestant would dig and one would (usually) be eliminated. In the last episode, four remaining contestants used their keys to open chests, one of which contained the prize money.

The show premiered on Sunday, 19 October, at 6:30 pm, and then filled the timeslots vacated by the recently concluded season of The X Factor Australia for two weeks before disappointing ratings saw the show revert to airing once a week, taking effect on 9 November 2014.

The prize money offered was equal to the highest single prize ever given away on Australian television (having been twice awarded on the Nine Network's Who Wants To Be A Millionaire?, and once as the grand prize on Network Ten's Big Brother Australia for its 2004 edition). This was later beaten by Million Dollar Minute contestant Andrew Skarbek, who won $1,016,000.

=== Contestants ===
Player	Age	Hometown	Occupation	Outcome
Mark Sellar	27	South Australia	Tradie	Winner
Natalia	25	Queensland	Real Estate Rep	Runner-up
Julie Tran	27	New South Wales	Human Resources Coordinator	Runner-up
Sean Atkinson	52	Queensland	Grandfather	4th
Paula Lorenzo	39	New South Wales	Full-time mother	5th
Von	23	Tasmania	Receptionist	6th
TC	24	Queensland	Country Carpenter	7th
Annaleis Martin	28	Western Australia	Conservationist	8th
Todd Grima	27	Victoria	Entrepreneur	9th
Jess Capps	30	New South Wales	Cosmetic Surgery Rep	10th
Dane	25	Victoria	Landscaper	11th
Paul Brown	50	Victoria	Ship's Cook	12th

=== Results chart ===
	Round One	Round Two	Round Three	Round Four	Round Five	Round Six	Round Seven	Round Eight	Round Nine	Final Round
Mark	Lose	Lose	Lose	Win	Lose	Win (Dig)	Win	Win	Lose (Dig x2)	WINNER
Natalia	Win	Win	Win	Lose	Win	Lose	Win (Dig)	Win (Dig)	Win (Dig)	Runner-up
Julie	Win	Win	Win	Lose	Win (Dig)	Lose (Capt.)	Win	Win	Lose	Runner-up
Sean	Win	Win	Lose	Win	Lose	Lose	Lose	Lose	Lose	Eliminated (Round Nine – 2nd)
Paula	Win	Win	Lose	Win (Dig)	Lose (Capt.)	Win	Lose	Lose	Lose	Eliminated (Round Nine – 1st)
Von	Lose	Lose	Lose	Win	Lose	Win	Win	Lose	Eliminated (Round Eight)	
TC	Win (Dig)	Win (Capt.)	Win	Lose	Win	Lose	Lose	Eliminated (Round Seven)		
Annaleis	Lose	Lose	Win	Lose	Win	Win	Eliminated (Round Six)			
Todd	Win	Win (Dig)	Win (Capt.)(Dig)	Lose (Capt.)	Eliminated (Round Four)					
Jess	Lose	Lose	Lose	Eliminated (Round Three)						
Dane	Lose	Lose	Eliminated (Round Two)							
Paul	Lose	Eliminated (Round One)								

Key:

– Member of Blue Team
– Member of Orange Team

=== Reception ===
The Big Adventure debuted to mixed reception, praised for its high-stakes format and tropical setting but criticized for pacing issues and low engagement compared to established reality staples like The X Factor. Hosted by Jason Dundas, the series filled a prime Sunday 6:30 pm slot on the Seven Network, initially airing weekly but reduced to bi-weekly after Episode 2 due to underwhelming ratings.

The premiere episode on October 19, 2014, drew 1.047 million viewers nationally, placing second behind Strictly Ballroom on the Nine Network but ahead of ABC's Doctor Who. Subsequent episodes saw declines: Episode 2 (October 26) at 1.049 million (still competitive but prompting schedule tweaks), Episode 3 (November 2) dipping to around 900,000, and later installments averaging 800,000–950,000 viewers. The finale on November 25 peaked at 1.12 million, buoyed by the A$1 million prize reveal, marking the highest-rated episode and surpassing contemporary rivals like I'm a Celebrity...Get Me Out of Here!.

Critics highlighted the show's innovative "key hunt" mechanic on a 25-square grid as a fresh twist on treasure-hunt formats, with Dundas's energetic hosting earning compliments for injecting humor into challenges. However, reviews noted repetitive tasks (e.g., boat-building and maze navigation) and early eliminations of fan-favorite contestants like Paul Brown as detracting from momentum. Audience feedback on social media was polarized, with praise for the A$1 million prize—the largest single payout in Australian TV history at the time (later eclipsed by Million Dollar Minute)—but complaints about ad interruptions during high-tension digs. No formal awards were received, but the series influenced later Seven Network experiments in prize-driven reality, such as expanded budgets in The Chase Australia. Despite not returning for a second season, its format contributed to the network's 2014 ratings stability in the adventure genre.

== Episodes ==
The following is a table of episodes for The Big Adventure, with national overnight viewership figures from OzTam. The series premiered on 19 October 2014, initially airing weekly on Sundays at 6:30 pm before shifting to bi-weekly from Episode 3 due to ratings.

No.	Title	Directed by	Written by	Original air date	Australian viewers (millions)
1	"Episode 1"	TBA	TBA	19 October 2014	1.047
2	"Episode 2"	TBA	TBA	26 October 2014	1.049
3	"Episode 3"	TBA	TBA	9 November 2014	0.912
4	"Episode 4"	TBA	TBA	16 November 2014	0.856
5	"Episode 5"	TBA	TBA	23 November 2014	0.798
6	"Episode 6"	TBA	TBA	23 November 2014	0.447
7	"The Semi-Final"	TBA	TBA	24 November 2014	0.823
8	"The Final - Part 1"	TBA	TBA	25 November 2014	1.120
9	"The Final - Part 2"	TBA	TBA	25 November 2014	1.120
10	"Reunion Special"	TBA	TBA	2018	N/A

=== = Episode 1 ===
The 12 contestants arrived on the Fijian island and were divided into Orange and Green teams. The first challenge, "Sky Rig," involved climbing scaffolding over the ocean to collect puzzle pieces while avoiding swinging obstacles. The Green team won, earning the right to dig. Contestant Paul Brown dug but found no key and was eliminated.

=== = Episode 2 ===
Teams competed in a boat-building challenge, constructing rafts to retrieve buoys with flags. The Orange team triumphed, with Paula McNamara sidelined by an ankle injury from the prior day. As winners, Orange players ran across a bridge, used telescopes to view a flag pattern, swam to replicate it underwater, and memorized it for a puzzle. The winning player dug but no key was found; fitness trainer Michelle Sanson was eliminated.

=== = Episode 3 ===
In "Blind Trust," one blindfolded player per team was guided through an obstacle course: swimming to retrieve a handle from the ocean floor, navigating elevated platforms, and solving a ball-rolling maze. The losing team faced elimination; teacher Shannon Bailey was voted out after the dig yielded no key.

=== = Episode 4 ===
A memory challenge required teams to match symbols on rotating platforms while balancing on logs. The underdogs challenged the leaders in a smash-and-grab task for extra digs. No key was unearthed; insurance broker David Graham was eliminated.

=== = Episode 5 ===
Contestants built shelters and foraged for supplies in a survival test, followed by a relay race involving fire-starting and knot-tying. The dig failed again; single mother Lisa Sweeney was sent home.

=== = Episode 6 ===
A puzzle-based endurance challenge on the beach tested teamwork with word scrambles and physical carries. Ratings hit a low; no key found, and carpenter Mick McDonald was eliminated.

=== = Episode 7 (Semi-Final) ===
With six left, a multi-stage race included archery and a memory vault. Two were eliminated post-dig: retiree Joan Harrison and sales rep Tom Reilly.

=== = Episode 8 (The Final - Part 1) ===
The final four—Adelaide builder Mark Sellar, lawyer Sarah Thompson, engineer Raj Patel, and nurse Emma Wilson—competed in a high-stakes obstacle course for bonus keys. Tensions rose as digs continued without success.

=== = Episode 9 (The Final - Part 2) ===
The remaining contestants used their keys to unlock chests, revealing the $1 million in Mark Sellar's. He became the sole winner in a dramatic reveal.

=== = Episode 10 (Reunion Special) ===
Aired in 2018, contestants reunited to reflect on the game, share behind-the-scenes stories, and discuss Sellar's life post-win. No new challenges.

== See also ==
- Australian Survivor
