= Hello Birdy =

- Genre: Documentary
- Presented by: William McInnes
- Country of origin: Australia
- Original language: English
- No. of seasons: 1
- No. of episodes: 6

Production
- Running time: 60 minutes

Original release
- Network: ABC1
- Release: 1 February – 8 March 2014

Hello Birdy is an Australian documentary television series presented by William McInnes. The first part of the six-part series aired on ABC1 on February 1, 2014.
