= Send In the Dogs Australia =

- Genre: Documentary
- Written by: Ross Wilson
- Directed by: Claire Meech
- Narrated by: Roxane Wilson
- Composer: Jay Stewart
- Country of origin: Australia
- Original language: English
- No. of seasons: 2
- No. of episodes: 5

Production
- Producer: Greg Quail
- Production locations: Victoria and Queensland, Australia
- Cinematography: Claire Meech
- Editors: Melanie Annan; Douglas Howard
- Production company: Quail Entertainment

Original release
- Network: Nine Network
- Release: 13 February 2011 – present

Send In the Dogs Australia is an Australian documentary television series about the work of police dogs.

== Synopsis ==
The series follows Australia's State Police Dog units as they help track and apprehend criminals. Each episode features exciting stories of how the dogs track fugitives and hunt for drugs and other contraband. It also explores the bond that develops between the dogs and their handlers.

The series first aired on Nine Network on 13 February 2011. The second season aired from 12 October 2011 to the present. The series is narrated by Roxane Wilson.
