= Disney XD (Australia and New Zealand) =

Defunct Australian television channel

- Final logo used from 1 September 2015 to 6 January 2019
- Country: Australia
- Broadcast area: Australia, New Zealand

Programming
- Language: English
- Picture format: 576i (SDTV)

Ownership
- Owner: The Walt Disney Company (Australia); Disney Branded Television; (Disney General Entertainment Content)
- Sister channels: Disney Channel; Disney Junior

History
- Launched: 10 April 2014; 12 years ago
- Closed: 6 January 2019; 7 years ago

Disney XD was an Australian subscription television channel, which was launched 10 April 2014 on Foxtel as a local feed of its American counterpart. It aired live-action, sports and animation shows which were aimed at boys aged six to fourteen. The channel was shut down on 6 January 2019.

== History ==
On 3 February 2014, Australian subscription television provider Foxtel announced it would launch two new family-genre channels over Easter 2014. In late February, it was announced Disney XD would be one of these family channels, scheduled to launch on 10 April 2014.

On 24 December 2014, the channel launched in New Zealand on Sky Television. On 27 February 2017, Disney XD was made available on Fetch TV.

On 1 December 2018, it was announced that Disney XD would cease broadcast on 6 January 2019, with a selection of programming moving to Disney Channel. Programs included Star Wars Resistance and various Marvel animation series. However, Disney Channel along with Disney Junior both ceased broadcast the in 2019 due to the planned launch of the Disney+ streaming service in Australia and New Zealand.
