= FX (Australian TV channel) =

FX (Australia)
- Country: Australia

Programming
- Language: English
- Picture format: 1080i HDTV (downscaled to 16:9 576i for the SDTV feed)
- Timeshift service: FX + 2

Ownership
- Owner: Fox Networks Group

History
- Launched: 26 February 2012
- Closed: 28 February 2018 (6 years, 2 days)

FX was an Australian subscription television channel which focused on its American counterpart, action-skewed television shows. The channel is owned and operated by Fox Networks Group and launched on 26 February 2012 on both Foxtel and Austar platforms.

On 12 June 2012 it was reported that a two-hour timeshift channel (FX + 2) would launch on 3 July 2012, but this was retracted for it to be later reported that it would launch on 6 September 2012. (Note: Advertised in Foxtel's 'Preview September 2012' email.)

On 28 February 2018, FX ceased broadcasting on Foxtel, after the final programming: criminal minds, Station ident/logo FX, Final words ‘THE FX CHANNEL HAS CEASED BROADCASTING’ ‘Starting March 1st all FX shows has moved to showcase the new home of Fx originals including drama pack’, with all of its programming moved to Fox Showcase.

== History ==
On 9 October 2011 Fox International Channels released details that FX would relaunch in Australia early 2012 with "long-awaited" programs such as The Walking Dead, Transporter: The Series, and Hell on Wheels. The channel launched on 26 February on Foxtel and Austar.

SoHo, formerly known as FX until 2003, was owned by Foxtel, while this incarnation of FX was owned and ran by Fox International Channels (and later Fox Networks Group; the company which operate National Geographic, Nat Geo Wild, and Nat Geo People in Australia).

=== Promotion ===
On Wednesday 2 February 2012, FX announced on their Facebook page that to kick off the channels re-launch there would be promotional zombie invasions in Australia's two largest capital cities, Sydney and Melbourne on Wednesday 8 February 2012 in the city centres.

== Programming ==
=== Final programming ===
==== Acquired programming ====
- Anger Management
- The Blacklist
- Borgia
- Burn Notice
- Copper
- Criminal Minds
- Fargo
- Fear the Walking Dead
- The Following
- Franklin & Bash
- From Dusk till Dawn: The Series
- Homeland
- Hell on Wheels
- Kingdom
- The Last Ship
- Las Vegas
- Legends
- Person of Interest
- Sons of Anarchy
- The Walking Dead

=== Past programming ===
==== Original programming ====
- The Ultimate Fighter: The Smashes
- The Ultimate Fighter Nations: Canada vs. Australia

==== Acquired programming ====
- 10 Items or Less
- Alias
- American Horror Story
- Arrested Development
- Bedlam
- The Booth at the End
- Breaking Bad
- The Bridge
- Call Me Fitz
- Chase
- Ch:os:en
- Da Vinci's Demons
- Dark Angel
- Dark Blue
- The District
- Endgame
- E-Ring
- Fear Itself
- The Fixer
- Hell on Wheels
- House of Lies
- Human Target
- The Increasingly Poor Decisions of Todd Margaret
- Jekyll
- Justified
- The Kill Point
- Lead Balloon
- Life on Mars
- Low Winter Sun
- Mad Dogs
- Martial Law
- NYPD Blue
- Penn & Teller: Bullshit!
- Prison Break
- ReGenesis
- Rescue Me
- The Shield
- The State Within
- Transporter: The Series
- The Tudors
- UFC Unleashed
- The Ultimate Fighter 10
- The Ultimate Fighter 11
- The Ultimate Fighter 12
- The Ultimate Fighter 13
- The Ultimate Fighter 14
- The Ultimate Fighter 15
- The Ultimate Fighter 16
- The Ultimate Fighter 17
- The Ultimate Fighter 18
- The Unit
- XIII
