= National Geographic (Australian and New Zealand TV channel) =

Australian and New Zealand subscription television network

National Geographic Oceania
- Country: Australia; New Zealand
- Broadcast area: Oceania

Programming
- Language: English
- Picture format: 576i (SDTV); 1080i (HDTV)
- Timeshift service: National Geographic +2

Ownership
- Owner: The Walt Disney Company (Asia Pacific) (Disney International Operations)
- Sister channels: Nat Geo Wild, ESPN, ESPN2 and Baby TV

History
- Launched: 1 September 1997
- Closed: 1 April 2023; 3 years ago
- Replaced by: Disney+

Links
- Website: natgeotv.com.au

Availability

Streaming media
- Foxtel Go: Channel 610
- Sky Go (NZ): skygo.co.nz

National Geographic Oceania was a subscription television documentary network in Oceania that featured programmes on subjects such as nature, science, culture and history, plus some reality television and pseudo-scientific entertainment programming. It was the Oceanian version of the National Geographic Channel Asia Pacific. From 2020 to 2023, it was the only Disney-owned network in Oceania (alongside Nat Geo Wild, ESPN and Baby TV) and to broadcast as a linear television channel, with the Disney Channel and Disney Junior having been shut down in favour of the streaming service Disney+.

== Overview ==
Many of the network's documentaries are produced by the U.S. counterpart, It features some programming similar to that on the Discovery Channel and History, such as nature and science documentaries. The channel is available through Foxtel, Optus (through Foxtel), and Fetch TV in Australia, and on Sky and Vodafone TV (through Sky) in New Zealand. Its advertising sales are handled by Multi Channel Network.

It had two sister channels: Nat Geo Wild and Nat Geo People.

== History ==
National Geographic Channel HD was launched as a high-definition simulcast of the channel on 22 June 2008. On 14 November 2016, the word "Channel" was dropped from its name and branding, at the same time as other network channels around the world.

On 14 February 2017, National Geographic was made available in HD for Fetch TV customers.

National Geographic, alongside Nat Geo Wild, were both removed from Foxtel on 1 March 2023 and permanently ceased broadcasting on 1 April 2023 in Australia and New Zealand, after leaving Fetch TV and Sky.

== Programmes ==
=== Original programming ===
- Aussie Firework Kings
- Aussie Recipes that Rock
- Aussie Icons with H.G. Nelson
- Australia: Life on the Edge
- Australia: The Time Traveller's Guide
- Australia’s Desert War
- Australia's Hardest Prison
- Tales by Light

=== Acquired programming ===
- Australia's hardest Prison: Lockdown Oz
- Air Crash Investigation (Note: Seasons 3–5; 7; 9-present excluding "Getting out Alive" from season 13.)
- Be the Creature
- Big Bang
- Brain Games
- Built for the Kill
- Crystal Skull
- Dog Whisperer with Cesar Millan
- End Day
- Escape Tech
- Explorations
- Explorer
- Gospel of Judas
- Hollywood Science
- Hunter Hunted
- I Didn't Know That
- Interpol Investigates
- Is It Real?
- The Living Edens
- Living Wild
- Megacities
- Megafactories
- MegaStructures
- Mysteries of the Deep
- Naked Science
- No Borders
- Perfect Weapon
- Planet Football
- Planet Mechanics
- Predators at War
- Rough Trades
- Science of Stupid
- Science of the Bible
- Seconds from Disaster
- StarTalk
- Storm Stories
- Strange Days on Planet Earth
- Taboo
- Thrill Zone
- Thunder Beasts
- Totally Wild
- Trading Faces
- Ultimate Airport Dubai
- What Would Happen If...?
- World of Wildlife
- World's Hardest Prison: Banged Up Abroad
