= Real History =

- Country: Australia; New Zealand (1998-2024)

Programming
- Language: English
- Picture format: 576i (SDTV); 1080i (HDTV)

Ownership
- Owner: Foxtel Networks
- Sister channels: Foxtel Networks channels

History
- Launched: 1 August 1996; 29 years ago
- Former names: Fox History/Soap/Talk/Travel (1996–1998); The History Channel (1998–2008); History (2008-2024)

Availability

Streaming media
- Service(s): Foxtel Go, Binge

History logo used from 2015 to 2022

Real History, formerly known as Fox History/Soap/Talk/Travel, The History Channel and simply History is a television channel in Australia and New Zealand, that broadcasts non-fictional programs regarding historical events and persons, as well as various metaphysical, pseudoscientific, and paranormal phenomena—often with observations and explanations by noted historians, scholars, authors, esotericists, astrologers, and Biblical scholars as well as reenactments and interviews with witnesses, and/or families of witnesses.

The channel is operated by Foxtel Networks. From 1998 to 2024, the programming and name of the channel was licensed to Foxtel by A&E Networks.

It started out as Fox History on 1 August 1996, and changed its name to The History Channel in November 1998. The channel used to share its frequency with Fox Kids until December 2000, when it got its own 24-hour channel.

On 3 November 2014, History launched a high-definition feed.

On 1 August 2024, the channel rebranded as Real History.
