= Studio (TV channel) =

STUDIO
- Final logo, used between 2012 and 2015
- Country: Australia

Programming
- Language: English
- Picture format: 576i (SDTV 16:9)

Ownership
- Owner: Special Broadcasting Service

History
- Launched: April 2010
- Replaced: Ovation
- Closed: 27 March 2015
- Replaced by: Foxtel Arts
- Former names: STVDIO (2010–2012)

Links
- Website: Official website

STUDIO was a subscription television arts channel available in Australia on the Foxtel and Austar platforms.

== History ==
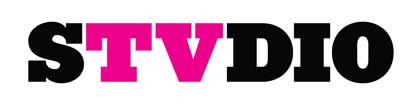
Original logo, used from 1 April 2010 until 1 March 2012

The channel launched in April 2010 as STVDIO, and was owned and operated by SBS Subscription TV, a subsidiary of free-to-air broadcaster Special Broadcasting Service.

The channel replaced Ovation on Foxtel and Austar. Studio was launched as a competitor to Ovation, since Foxtel believed Ovation was not rating strongly enough.

STUDIO was Australia's only channel dedicated to arts and entertainment. It broadcast classical and popular music, literature, film, visual arts and dance with documentaries and performances.

As part of a brand redesign in March 2012, the channel was renamed STUDIO, considered a more accessible name.

The channel was forced to close on 27 March 2015 as it was unable to re-negotiate their contract with Foxtel, and was instead replaced with Foxtel-owned channel Foxtel Arts. As a result, a number of the channel's arts programs moved to SBS and its video on demand service.

== Local Australian productions ==
The channel also recorded live local music, theatre and dance productions, known as the STUDIO Season Ticket.

- Smoke & Mirrors with iOTA – Filmed at The Famous Spiegeltent during Sydney Festival 2011.
- Amadou & Mariam at WOMADelaide 2011 – The blind Mali duo performed at Adelaide's world music festival in March.
- Iconic Songs with Archie Roach – Indigenous performer and activist Archie Roach was joined by long-time friends Shane Howard and Neil Murray at WOMADelaide 2011 to perform three iconic Australian songs.
- The 2011 Helpmann Awards – Australia's performing arts awards, broadcast live from the Sydney Opera House.
- The Australian Ballet presents Graeme Murphy's Romeo & Juliet – Live broadcast from Melbourne's the Arts Centre.
- notes from the hard road and beyond from Melbourne Festival 2011 – STUDIO announced it would record the closing night of the Melbourne International Arts Festival with performances by Joss Stone, Mavis Staples, and Rickie-Lee Jones.

== Arts community ==
In addition to live performances, STUDIO also broadcast news about the Australian arts community. The channel broadcast short programs called [ STUDIO ‘Artbreaks’ which included interviews with local and international artists, performers, and coverage of current arts events.

Past artists include:

- Dance choreographer Graeme Murphy
- Director Wim Wenders
- Author Thomas Keneally
- Author Shaun Tan
- Conductor and classical musician Vladimir Ashkenazy
- Author Tim Winton
- Singer Dee Dee Bridgewater
- Theatre icon John Bell
- Director Adam Elliot
- Go-Betweens founder Robert Forster
- Speigeltent Maestro David Bates
- Opera star Cecilia Bartoli
- You Am I member Tim Rogers

Past arts events covered include:

- 21st Century: Art in the First Decade exhibition at GoMA, Brisbane
- Brisbane Festival 2011
- Adelaide Cabaret Festival
- Biennale of Sydney 2010
- Desert Harmony Festival 2010
- Edge of Elsewhere exhibition, Sydney Festival 2010
- New Indigenous Wings, National Gallery of Australia
- Ballets Russes: The Art of Costume exhibition, National Gallery of Australia
- Venice Biennale 2011
- ACO Instruments – from the Instrument Fund
- ABAF Awards 2010
