= Cartoon Network (Australia and New Zealand) =

Australian and New Zealand television channel

Cartoon Network Australia
- Country: Australia
- Broadcast area: Oceania
- Headquarters: Sydney, New South Wales, Australia

Programming
- Languages: English; Māori
- Picture format: 1080i HDTV (downscaled to 576i for the Australian feed)

Ownership
- Owner: Skydance Corporation
- Sister channels: Boomerang

History
- Launched: 30 June 1995; 31 years ago (as a part of the Cartoon Network Asia); 3 October 1995; 31 years ago (independent feed); 2 November 2025; 12 months ago (Australia only, relaunch on Fetch TV)
- Closed: 13 May 2025; 18 months ago (Australia only, on Foxtel); 2 December 2025; 11 months ago (New Zealand)
- Replaced by: Sky Kids (New Zealand)

Availability

Streaming media
- skygo.co.nz

Cartoon Network is an Australian pay television channel broadcast as a local feed of its American counterpart. It was launched on 3 October 1995, and is owned by Skydance Corporation. It primarily airs animated programming.

The channel began in Australia as a part of the Cartoon Network Asia service on 30 June 1995. It was later separated from the broader pan-Asian service on 3 October 1995.

== History ==
Cartoon Network started broadcasting in Australia on 30 June 1995, as the dual-channel TNT and Cartoon Network as part of the Foxtel cable television launch, broadcasting from 6:00 am to 9:00 pm, with TNT (later Turner Classic Movies) airing on the remainder of the daily schedule. It also joined Optus Vision, with the provider signing a carriage contract shortly before the channel's launch.

On 3 October 1995, Cartoon Network Australia became a separate 24-hour channel. Its original schedule only featured Hanna-Barbera cartoons such as Yogi Bear, Top Cat, and The Flintstones. The channel then started to develop quickly, and began airing MGM cartoons such as Tom and Jerry, Droopy, and Spike and Tyke, on 1 January 1996, and (after Time Warner's acquisition of Turner Broadcasting System in 1996) Warner Bros. shows, including Looney Tunes and several other Looney Tunes-related cartoons on 1 January 1997. In mid-1997, Cartoon Network started airing its original shows such as Space Ghost Coast to Coast, Dexter's Laboratory and The Moxy Show. At the time, it was added to Northgate Communications in Ballarat.

Cartoon Network was launched in New Zealand in 1997, broadcasting on Sky's UHF service until 2000 between 6 am and 4 pm.

In April 2004, the channel was added to TransTV. Until mid-2004, Cartoon Network was tied with Disney Channel as Australia's most popular family network. The removal of older programming from the network during this period led to a decline in average audience share during 2004, as some of the older cartoons moved to Boomerang. Cartoon Network fell to second spot among Australian family networks behind Disney Channel.

In December 2007, Adult Swim was removed from the channel but relaunched on The Comedy Channel in February 2008, airing shows such as Robot Chicken and Harvey Birdman, Attorney at Law. The network transitioned to a widescreen format presentation on 30 November 2010, shortly before Foxtel's deadline for channels to switch to the widescreen format occurred.

On 7 February 2017, Cartoon Network Australia announced an exclusive video on-demand content deal with the streaming service Stan. As part of the deal, episodes from some shows such as Adventure Time and The Powerpuff Girls premiered on Stan at the same time as Cartoon Network.

During Māori Language Week in 2018, the channel aired episodes of We Bare Bears in the language; New Zealand actor Temuera Morrison voiced Grizz.

On 22 April 2021, the channel was discontinued on Fetch TV, alongside its sister channel Boomerang. Its removal led to a campaign initiated by Fetch upon the discontinuation, later justifying the accessibility of CNN content on its official website. After that date, the channels were exclusive to Foxtel.

The channel, along with Boomerang and CNN, closed in Australia on 13 May 2025, after its removal from Foxtel.

Cartoon Network, along with Boomerang and CNN, returned to Australia via Fetch TV on 1 November 2025.

The channel was removed from Sky in New Zealand on 2 December 2025.

== Logo history ==
3 October 1995 – 16 August 2005

16 August 2005 – 1 October 2011

1 October 2011 – present (Australia), 1 October 2011 – 2 December 2025 (New Zealand)

== Program blocks ==
=== Current ===
==== Cartoonito ====
Cartoonito launched on 4 July 2022; a Cartoonito Play Zone was held at Federation Square between 7 and 9 July, as a launch event.

=== Former ===
==== Adult Swim ====
Adult Swim launched on Cartoon Network in 2003, as an adult-targeted programming block featuring anime and adult animation in separate days. The anime block aired from Monday to Thursday and started at 10:00pm and ended at 12:00am. The comedy block aired on Fridays and Saturdays and started at 10:30 pm and ended at 12:00 am with an encore until 1:30. Several shows such as Squidbillies featured a disclaimer about the content, as did most of the anime.

The block was removed from Cartoon Network in December 2007, for strategic reasons. The block was moved to The Comedy Channel in February 2008, with Harvey Birdman, Attorney at Law and Aqua Teen Hunger Force as well as the Australian premiere of Robot Chicken and Moral Orel. Most of the anime that previously aired on Adult Swim moved to the Sci Fi Channel with its own anime block. Adult Swim also aired on 9Rush from 2016 to 2019.

Madman Entertainment released Adult Swim DVDs in region 4 starting with Aqua Teen, Harvey Birdman and Robot Chicken in 2007. It had released most volumes of every series that were issued on DVD in the region.

==== Toonami ====
Toonami was launched on Cartoon Network on 7 July 2001, as an outlet for action animation. Most of its lineup consisted of anime, including Dragon Ball Z, as well as the Australian premiere of Cardcaptors and exclusives such as Mobile Suit Gundam Wing and YuYu Hakusho. Occasionally, it also aired action cartoons from the United States such as Batman Beyond.

On its launch, Toonami broadcast on Saturday evenings from 6:00 pm to 8:00 pm and on Sunday afternoons from 3:00 pm to 5:00 pm. Each day's programming was repeated in the Toonami "Late Run" from 11:00 pm to 1:00 am. Toonami later expanded to weekdays, and for several years it was shown seven days a week. Although time-slots varied, the main Toonami block remained on weekday afternoons; in 2005, it was airing weeknights from 6.00 pm, with mini-marathons airing on Saturday and Sunday mornings.

In August 2006, Toonami was removed from the Cartoon Network schedule. The block's programming moved the network's other time-slots.

==== Boomerang ====
Logo of Boomerang

Cartoon Network's sister channel Boomerang was originally a block on Cartoon Network featuring lesser-known Hanna-Barbera classic cartoons that did not regularly air on half-hour slots. It began in April 2001, as a morning block airing at 10:00 am to 12:00 pm, but in August 2001, it also aired as an hour-long mini-block in Cartoon Network After Dark. The shows on Boomerang changed randomly every week, for both the morning and the evening block. The Boomerang blocks had bumpers which featured children's toys of characters from Hanna-Barbera cartoons, identical to the Boomerang bumpers used in the United States. These bumpers were sometimes also used on the television channel. The evening block ended in March 2002, and the morning block ended in September 2004. However, late-night airings of Boomerang on Cartoon Network continued until early 2005. The standalone television channel launched on 14 March 2004. In December 2012, it was rebranded to match with Boomerang's UK feed, before rebranding again in November 2014. On 13 May 2025, the channel, along with Cartoon Network, was removed from Foxtel, effectively closing the channel.
