= Lifestyle You =

Australian subscription TV channel

- Country: Australia

Programming
- Language(s): English
- Timeshift service: Lifestyle YOU +2

Ownership
- Owner: Foxtel Networks
- Sister channels: Foxtel Networks channels

History
- Launched: 15 November 2009
- Closed: 11 October 2017

Links
- Website: lifestyleyou.com.au

Lifestyle You (stylised as Lifestyle YOU) was an Australian subscription TV channel. It was a sister channel to Lifestyle, Lifestyle Home and Lifestyle Food. Lifestyle You was home to personal makeovers, hilarious and honest reality, health, wellness, family and relationship programming.

In August 2017, Foxtel announced that Lifestyle You would end in October and that its content would move to Lifestyle and Arena.

== Original programming ==
- Trinny & Susannah's Australian Makeover Mission (2011)
- Eat Yourself Sexy Australia (2011)
- Wife Swap Australia (2012)
- Embarrassing Bodies Down Under (2013)
- Meet the Frockers (2014)

== Logo history ==
15 November 2009 – 18 September 2016

19 September 2016 – 11 October 2017

== See also ==
- Lifestyle
- Lifestyle Food
- Lifestyle Home
