= Disney Junior (Australia & New Zealand) =

Defunct Australian and New Zealand television channel

Disney Junior Australia
- Country: Australia
- Broadcast area: Australia; New Zealand (2005–2019); Pacific Islands
- Headquarters: Richmond, Victoria

Programming
- Language: English
- Picture format: 576i (SDTV)

Ownership
- Owner: The Walt Disney Company (Australia) Pty Ltd. Disney Channels Worldwide (Walt Disney Direct-to-Consumer & International)
- Sister channels: Disney Channel (1996–2020); Disney XD (2014–2019)

History
- Launched: 5 December 2005; 20 years ago
- Closed: 30 November 2019; 6 years ago (New Zealand); 30 April 2020; 6 years ago (Australia)
- Replaced by: Disney+ (most of its content)
- Former names: Playhouse Disney (2005–2011)

Disney Junior was an Australian and New Zealand pay television channel owned and operated by The Walt Disney Company in Australia and was the sister network of the flagship property Disney Channel. The channel was originally launched on 5 December 2005 as Playhouse Disney, with programming targeted towards children aged 2 to 7, as well as their families, with original series and movies. The channel was relaunched and rebranded as Disney Junior on 29 May 2011.

The channel's programming is composed of original animated television series sourced from Disney Junior in the United States, as well as screenings of Disney's theatrical releases and other acquired programming.

After indications that Disney Channel and Disney Junior would close in early 2020 due to the launch of Disney+ and expiring contracts, Foxtel advised that negotiations with Disney were continuing to keep broadcasting the networks. However, Sky confirmed that both channels would close in New Zealand from 30 November 2019. Foxtel confirmed that the channels would be leaving their service at the end of February 2020, and on Fetch TV at the end of April 2020.

== Programming ==
Disney Junior's programming schedule mainly consisted of animated series for children, sourced from Disney Junior in the United States. Titles airing in the 2010s have included Mickey Mouse Clubhouse and Jake and the Never Land Pirates.

Disney Junior's schedule also included internationally produced series acquired by Disney Channels Worldwide, including PJ Masks, Claude, Gigantosaurus, Bluey, 101 Dalmatian Street and Go Away, Unicorn!.

The channel aired event screenings of Disney's theatrical releases, including Mickey's Once Upon a Christmas.

Disney Junior Australia had also commissioned and produced original local series, including The Book of Once Upon a Time, which featured Australian voices reading classic and contemporary Disney stories. The network also debuted Alphabet Street in 2019.
