= Bio (Australian TV channel) =

Bio.
- Country: Australia

Programming
- Language: English

Ownership
- Owner: Foxtel Networks

History
- Launched: 2004
- Closed: 1 November 2015
- Former names: The Biography Channel (2004–2007)

Links
- Website: biochannel.com.au

Bio (stylised as bio., formerly The Biography Channel) was an Australian general entertainment channel available on Australia's Foxtel, Austar and Optus Television pay television services.

In 2014, the channel rebranded with a new on-air look, logo and programming. In addition, the channel moved from channel 117 to channel 133.

On 1 November 2015, the channel closed, ceasing transmission at 4 am, with selected titles moving to other Foxtel-owned channels.

Former Bio. Logo

== Programming ==
- Airline
- The Dog Whisperer
- Fashion File
- Inside Edition
- Intervention
- Judge Judy
- The Peoples Court
- Planet Rock Profiles
- RPA
- Sober House
- This Is Your Life

== See also ==
- FYI (American TV channel)
- The Biography Channel (Canada)
- The Biography Channel (British and Irish TV channel)
- FYI (Southeast Asian TV channel)
