= Disney Channel (Australia & New Zealand) =

Defunct Australian and New Zealand television channel

Disney Channel Australia
- Final logo used from 2018 to 30 April 2020
- Country: Australia
- Broadcast area: Australia; New Zealand (2003–2019)
- Headquarters: Richmond, Victoria

Programming
- Language: English
- Picture format: SDTV 576i, 16:9

Ownership
- Owner: The Walt Disney Company (Australia) Pty Ltd.
- Sister channels: Disney Junior (2005–2020); Disney XD (2014–2019)

History
- Launched: 8 June 1996; 30 years ago (Australia); 24 December 2003; 22 years ago (New Zealand)
- Closed: 30 November 2019; 6 years ago (New Zealand); 30 April 2020; 6 years ago (Australia)
- Replaced by: Disney+ (most of its content)
- Former names: The Disney Channel (1996–97, Australia)

Disney Channel (originally called The Disney Channel from 1996 to 1997) was an Australian and New Zealand pay television channel. It was the flagship television property owned and operated by The Walt Disney Company in Australia. A localization version of the American television channel of the same name, it was launched in 1996, and targeted towards children and families, with original series and movies.

The network's programming consisted of original animated and live action children's television series sourced from the Disney Channel including their original made-for-television movies, as well as screenings of Disney's theatrical releases and other acquired programming.

The network closed in New Zealand on 30 November 2019 on Sky, and in Australia on 1 March 2020 on Foxtel. It was discontinued on 30 April 2020 on Fetch TV.

== History ==
Disney Channel was launched by Optus on 8 June 1996; the first program broadcast was the Australian television premiere of Aladdin. It became available though Austar on 1 April 2001, through Foxtel on 1 December 2001, and through TransTV on 21 January 2002. It was formerly available on SelecTV from September 2008 until the closure of its English service in late 2010. The network launched on New Zealand's pay television network, SKY Network Television, on 24 December 2003.

Disney launched the Playhouse Disney channel in Australia and New Zealand on 5 December 2005, which later relaunched and rebranded as Disney Junior on 29 May 2011. An additional network named Disney XD launched on 10 April 2014, featuring programming targeted towards boys aged 6–14. Disney XD closed on 6 January 2019, with some of the network's programming moving to Disney Channel, including Star Wars Resistance and various Marvel animations. With Disney XD programming being integrated into the main channel, the network would contain fewer advertisement breaks.

Disney Channel also hosted a "FanFest" event in Australia, with its third local event being held at Martin Place in Sydney in August 2016. The network organised a concert featuring American singer Sabrina Carpenter, which was hosted by the Australian network's personalities, and live streamed on the website. General manager of the network, Leisa Sadler, noted the importance of brand activation through having a physical event for fans to connect with, and appreciated the opportunity to promote the channel's local programming. More than 2,000 people attended the event and over 3,000 watched online. Previous "FanFest" events featured personalities Bridgit Mendler and Ross Lynch.

After indications that Disney Channel and Disney Junior would close in early 2020 due to the launch of Disney+ and expiring contracts, Foxtel advised that negotiations with Disney were continuing to keep broadcasting the networks. However, Sky confirmed that both channels would close in New Zealand from 30 November 2019. Foxtel confirmed that the channels would be removed from their service at the end of February 2020, and on Fetch TV at the end of April 2020.

== Programming ==
Disney Channel's programming schedule mainly consisted of live action sitcoms and animated series for children, sourced from Disney Channel in the United States. Titles airing in the 2000s included Hannah Montana, Kim Possible, Lizzie McGuire, Lilo & Stitch: The Series and Sabrina. Programs broadcast by the network in the 2010s included Andi Mack, Austin & Ally, Big Hero 6: The Series, Girl Meets World, K.C. Undercover and Raven's Home.

Disney Channel's schedule also included internationally produced series acquired by Disney Channel Worldwide, including Hotel Transylvania: The Series, Rolling with the Ronks! and The ZhuZhus. In January 2017, Disney Channel acquired the license to air the local Australian series Grace Beside Me, a co-production between NITV and ABC, which premiered in March 2019.

The network aired broadcasts of Disney's theatrical releases, with Pixar films including A Bug's Life, Monsters, Inc., and from the Walt Disney Animation Studios such as Aladdin and The Emperor's New Groove. The network also aired Disney Channel Original Movies, including the High School Musical and Descendants franchises.

Disney Channel Australia also commissioned and produced several of its own scripted drama series, including a local version of As the Bell Rings, and original miniseries Mind Over Maddie. In 2013, the network debuted a local short-form series titled Hanging With, which takes the form of an afternoon variety show, featuring hosts who act as the faces of the channel and present programming news and other entertainment segments. In 2019, the network produced a short-form miniseries entitled Spread the Word, which explores words from Aboriginal and Torres Strait Islander languages. Other local programming included Backstage Pass and Radio Disney Insider.

Programs that moved to the network after the closure of Disney XD in 2019 included Big City Greens, DuckTales, Gravity Falls, Pokémon: Sun & Moon, Star Wars Resistance and various Marvel animations including Avengers Assemble and Spider-Man.

== Sister channels ==
=== Disney Junior ===
Disney Junior was a 24-hour Australian cable and satellite channel available on local platforms. It launched on 5 December 2005 as Playhouse Disney and rebranded on 29 May 2011 as Disney Junior, with programming targeted towards children aged 2–7. It closed along with Disney Channel on 30 April 2020.

=== Disney XD ===
Disney XD was a 24-hour Australian cable and satellite channel available on Foxtel. It launched on 10 April 2014. All of the programs targeted boys aged 6–14. The network closed on 6 January 2019, after 5 years on the air.

== See also ==
- List of television networks by country
- Playhouse Disney
- Disney Channel
- Disney XD
- Disney Branded Television
