= List of television programs: S =

Alphabetically indexed lists of television programs
0–9	A	B	C	D	E	F	G	H	I–J
K–L	M	N	O	P	Q–R	S	T	U–V–W	X–Y–Z

This is an alphabetical list of television program articles (or sections within articles about television programs). Spaces and special characters are ignored. This list covers television programs whose first letter (excluding "the") of the title is S.

== S ==
=== SA ===
- Sábado Gigante
- Sabado Sensacional
- Sabrina: The Animated Series
- Sabrina: Secrets of a Teenage Witch
- Sabrina the Teenage Witch
- The Sabrina the Teenage Witch Show
- Sabrina's Secret Life
- Sacred Games
- The Saddle Club
- Sadie J
- Sadie Sparks
- Sagwa the Chinese Siamese Cat
- Sailor Moon
- The Saint
- Saint George
- Sale of the Century
- Salem's Lot (1979)
- Salem's Lot (2004)
- Sally (1957)
- Sally (1983)
- The Salt-N-Pepa Show
- Salute Your Shorts
- Sam (1973)
- Sam (1978)
- Samantha Who?
- Sam & Cat
- The Samurai (Japan)
- Samurai Champloo
- Samurai Girl
- Samurai Jack
- Sancharam
- Sanctuary
- The Sandbaggers (British)
- The Sandman
- The Sandy Duncan Show
- Sanford
- Sanford and Son
- Sanford Arms
- Sanjay and Craig
- Santa Clarita Diet
- Santiago of the Seas
- Sapphire & Steel
- Sara
- Sarah & Duck
- The Sarah Jane Adventures
- Sasuke (Japan)
- SAS: Who Dares Wins
- Satisfaction (Australia, 2007)
- Satisfaction (Canada, 2013)
- Satisfaction (US, 2014)
- Saturday Night Live
- Saturday Night Live Weekend Update Thursday
- Saturday Night's Main Event
- Saul of the Mole Men
- Savannah
- Saved by the Bell
- Saved by the Bell: The College Years
- Saved by the Bell: The New Class
- Save My Life: Boston Trauma
- The Save-Ums! (Canada)
- Saving Grace
- Saving Hope (Canada)
- Say Yes to the Dress
- Say Yes to the Dress: Atlanta
- Say Yes to the Dress: Australia
- Say Yes to the Dress: Bridesmaids
- Say Yes to the Dress: Randy Knows Best

=== SC ===
- Scandal
- Scandal: A Shocking and Wrongful Incident (South Korea)
- Scarecrow and Mrs. King
- Scaredy Squirrel (TV series)
- Scare Tactics
- Scattergories
- Schitt's Creek
- Schlitz Playhouse of Stars
- Schooled
- Schoolhouse Rock!
- School of Rock
- Science Fiction Theatre
- Scientific American Frontiers
- Scooby-Doo! Mystery Incorporated
- Scooby-Doo and Scrappy-Doo (1979)
- Scooby-Doo and Scrappy-Doo (1980)
- The Scooby-Doo Show
- Scooby-Doo, Where Are You! (1969)
- Scoop and Doozie
- Scorpion
- Scotland Today
- The Scott and Gary Show
- Scott the Woz
- Scrabble
- Scream
- Scream Queens (2008)
- Scream Queens (2015)
- Scrubs
- Scruff

=== SE ===
- Sea Hunt
- Sealab 2020
- Sealab 2021
- SEAL Team
- Sea Monsters (UK)
- Sea Princesses (Brazil/Australia)
- seaQuest DSV
- Search
- Search Party
- Search for Tomorrow
- Season 25: Oprah Behind the Scenes
- SEC Storied
- Second Chance
- Second City Television (SCTV)
- Second Verdict (UK)
- Second Wives Club
- Secret Agent
- Secret Diary of a Call Girl
- Secrets of Sulphur Springs
- The Secret Life of the American Teenager
- Secret Lives of the Super Rich
- The Secret Millionaire
- Secret Millionaires Club
- The Secret Saturdays
- The Secret Service (UK)
- The Secret Show
- The Secret World of Alex Mack
- Secrets of the Cryptkeeper's Haunted House
- The Secrets of Isis
- Secrets & Lies (Australia)
- Secrets and Lies (US)
- Secrets and Wives
- See
- See Dad Run
- Seeing Things
- See It Now
- Seinfeld
- Seiren (2017, Japan)
- Selector Infected WIXOSS
- Selena + Chef
- Selfie
- Sell This House
- Selling New York
- Sense8
- The Sentimental Agent
- The Sentinel
- Seoige (Ireland)
- Separation Anxiety
- Sergeant Cork
- Sergeant Preston of the Yukon
- A Series of Unfortunate Events
- Seriously Weird
- Sesame Street
- Set for Life
- Seven Little Monsters
- The Seventies
- Severance
- Sex (Australia)
- Sex Box (UK)
- Sex Box (US)
- Sex and the City
- The Sex Lives of College Girls
- Sex Rehab with Dr. Drew
- Sex Sent Me to the ER
- Sex with Brody
- Sex Education

=== SH ===
- Shaabiat Al Cartoon
- Shades of Blue
- Shadow and Bone
- Shadowhunters
- Shaggy & Scooby-Doo Get a Clue!
- Shahs of Sunset
- Shake It Up (US)
- Shake It Up (India)
- Shaman King
- Shameless (UK)
- Shameless (US)
- Sha Na Na
- The Shannara Chronicles
- Shark (South Korea)
- Shark (US)
- Shark Tank (Australia)
- Shark Tank (US)
- Sharp Objects
- A Sharp Intake of Breath
- Shaun the Sheep
- Shazam!
- Shazzan
- Sheep in the Big City
- She-Hulk: Attorney at Law
- She-Ra and the Princesses of Power
- She-Ra: Princess of Power
- Sheriff Callie's Wild West
- Sherlock (UK)
- Sherlock Holmes (1951) (BBC)
- Sherlock Holmes (1954) (US)
- Sherlock Holmes (1965) (BBC)
- Sherlock Holmes (1967) (Germany)
- Sherlock Holmes (1968) (Italy)
- Sherlock Holmes (1984) (Britain)
- Sherlock Holmes (2013) (Russia)
- Sherlock Holmes in the 22nd Century
- Sherlock Holmes and Doctor Watson (BBC)
- Sherri
- SheZow
- She's the Sheriff
- The Shield
- Shimmer and Shine
- Shindig!
- Shine On with Reese
- $#*! My Dad Says
- Shoestring (BBC)
- Shōgun
- Shoot for the Stars
- Shooter
- Shop 'Til You Drop
- A Shop for Killers
- A Shot at Love with Tila Tequila
- Showbiz Tonight
- Shower of Stars
- Showmatch (Argentina)
- Show Me the Money (US)
- Showtime at the Apollo
- Showtime Championship Boxing
- The Show with Vinny
- Shrill
- Shuriken School

=== SI ===
- Siberi
- Sidekick (Canada)
- Sidewalks Entertainment
- Sidewalks: Video Nite
- Sid the Science Kid
- Sierra
- Siesta Key
- Silent Library
- The Silent Years
- Silicon Valley
- Silk Stalkings
- The Silver Chair (British series) (1990)
- The Silver Guardian (China-Japan)
- Silver Spoons
- Silver Surfer
- Simon & Simon
- The Simple Life
- The Simpsons
- Sinais de Vida
- Sing Along with Mitch
- Sing If You Can (UK)
- Sing It Again (simulcast of radio program)
- The Singing Bee
- Single Parents
- Singled Out
- The Sinner
- Sir Arthur Conan Doyle's The Lost World
- Sir Francis Drake
- Siren
- Sirens
- Sirota's Court
- SiS (Philippines)
- Sister Boniface Mysteries
- Sister Kate
- Sister, Sister
- Sister Wives
- Sisterhood of Hip Hop
- Sisters
- Sit Down, Shut Up
- Sitting Ducks
- The Situation Room with Wolf Blitzer
- Six
- Six Degrees
- Six Feet Under
- The Six Million Dollar Man
- The Six Wives of Henry VIII
- The Sixties

=== SK ===
- SK8-TV
- Skam (Norway)
- Skating with Celebrities
- Skating with the Stars
- Skin
- Skinnamarink TV
- Skins (UK)
- Skins (US)
- Skin Wars
- Skip and Shannon: Undisputed
- Skippy the Bush Kangaroo (Australia)
- Ski Sunday (UK)
- Skunk Fu
- Sky Dancers
- Sky King
- Sky News Today (UK)
- Skyland
- Skylanders Academy

=== SL ===
- Slasher
- Slave Market
- Sledge Hammer!
- Sleeper Cell
- Sleepy Hollow
- SLiDE
- Slide Hustle
- Sliders
- Slings and Arrows
- Slugterra

=== SM ===
- Smack the Pony
- Small Fry Club
- Smallville
- Small Wonder
- Smart Guy
- Smash
- Smiling Friends
- The Smothers Brothers Comedy Hour
- The Smurfs

=== SN ===
- Snap Decision
- Snapped
- Snapped: Killer Couples
- Snapped: She Made Me Do It
- Sneak Preview
- Sneak Previews
- Sneakiepeeks
- Sneaky Links: Dating After Dark
- Sneaky Pete
- Snooki & Jwoww
- Snorks
- Snowdrop (South Korea)
- Snowfall
- Snowpiercer

=== SO ===
- So Awkward
- So Cosmo
- So Help Me Todd
- So Little Time
- So Random!
- So Weird
- So You Think You Can Dance (US)
- Soap
- Sofia the First
- Softly, Softly
- Softly, Softly: Task Force (BBC)
- Solar Opposites
- Solid Gold
- Solstrom (Canada)
- Some Assembly Required (US) (2007)
- Some Assembly Required (Canada) (2014)
- Some Mothers Do 'Ave 'Em (UK)
- Somebody's Gotta Do It
- Somerset
- Something Is Out There
- Something So Right
- Son of the Bride
- Soñando por Bailar (Argentina)
- Songland
- Songs of Praise (UK)
- Sonic Boom
- Sonic the Hedgehog
- Sonic Underground
- Sonic X
- Sonic Zombie
- The Sonny & Cher Comedy Hour
- Sonny with a Chance
- Sono 'Okodawari', Watashi ni mo Kure yo!!
- Sons and Daughters
- Sons of Anarchy
- Sooty and Sweep
- The Sopranos
- Soul Train
- The Soup
- South of Nowhere
- South Park
- Southern at Heart
- Southern Charm
- Southern Charm New Orleans
- Southland

=== SP ===
- Space: 1999
- Space: Above and Beyond
- Space Academy
- Space Angel
- Space Battleship Yamato
- Space Cases
- Space Chickens in Space
- Spaced
- Spaceghost
- Space Ghost Coast to Coast
- Space Goofs
- The Space Gypsy Adventures
- Space Patrol (1950)
- Space Patrol (1962)
- Space Pirates (UK)
- Space Racers
- Space Rangers
- Spaceballs: The Animated Series
- Spartakus and the Sun Beneath the Sea
- Special Agent Oso
- The Spectacular Spider-Man
- Speechless
- Speed Buggy
- Speed Racer
- Speed Racer: The Next Generation
- Spellbinder
- Spellbinder: Land of the Dragon Lord
- Spenser: For Hire
- Spender (BBC)
- Spencer (NBC)
- Spice and Wolf
- Spider-Man (1967)
- Spider-Man (1981)
- Spider-Man (1994)
- Spider-Man (2017)
- Spider-Man: The New Animated Series
- The Spiderwick Chronicles
- Spidey and His Amazing Friends
- Spin City
- Spin the Wheel
- Spirit Riding Free
- Spiritpact (China)
- Spitting Image (UK)
- Splash! (UK)
- Splash (US)
- Splash and Bubbles
- Splatalot! (Australia)
- Splatalot! (Canada)
- Splatalot! (US)
- Splatalot! (UK)
- Spliced (Canada)
- Splitting Up Together
- SpongeBob SquarePants
- Spooks
- Spooksville
- SportsCenter
- SportsCentre (Canada)
- Sports Jeopardy!
- SportsNation
- Sportsnight (BBC)
- Sports Night (US)
- SportsNight with James Bracey (Australia)
- Sport Relief (UK)
- Sport Relief Does The Apprentice (UK)
- The Sports Reporters
- Sports Tonight (Australia)
- Spring Break Challenge
- Springwatch (BBC)
- Spy
- Spy X Family
- Spyforce (Australia)
- Spy Game
- Spy Groove
- Spy Kids: Mission Critical

=== SQ ===
- Squad Wars
- Square One Television
- Square Pegs
- Squidbillies
- Squid Game
- Squirrel Boy

=== ST ===
- Stacked
- Stage Show
- Stagecoach West
- The Stagers
- Standoff
- Stanley
- Star
- Star Blazers
- Star-Crossed
- Star Darlings
- Starface
- Star Falls
- Star vs. the Forces of Evil
- Stargate Atlantis
- Stargate Infinity
- Stargate SG-1
- Stargate Universe
- Stark Raving Mad
- Star Beam
- Starman
- Star Search
- Stars Earn Stripes
- Stars on Mars
- Starsky and Hutch
- Starstuff
- Star Trek: The Animated Series
- Star Trek: Deep Space Nine
- Star Trek: Discovery
- Star Trek: Enterprise
- Star Trek: Lower Decks
- Star Trek: The Next Generation
- Star Trek: The Original Series
- Star Trek: Picard
- Star Trek: Prodigy
- Star Trek: Short Treks
- Star Trek: Strange New Worlds
- Star Trek: Voyager
- Star Wars: The Bad Batch
- Star Wars: Clone Wars
- Star Wars: The Clone Wars (2008)
- Star Wars: Droids
- Star Wars: Ewoks
- Star Wars Forces of Destiny
- Star Wars Rebels
- Star Wars Resistance
- Star Wars: Visions
- Stat
- The State
- State of Grace
- State of the Union
- Staten Island Law
- Stath Lets Flats
- Static Shock
- Station 19
- Station Eleven
- Stay Lucky
- St. Denis Medical
- Steins;Gate
- Stella (UK)
- Stella (US)
- Stella and Sam
- St. Elsewhere
- Step by Step
- Steptoe and Son
- Steve
- The Steve Allen Show
- Steve Austin's Broken Skull Challenge
- Steve Harvey
- The Steve Harvey Show
- Steve Harvey's Big Time Challenge
- Steve Harvey's Funderdome
- Steven Universe
- The Steve Wilkos Show
- Stickin' Around
- Still the King
- Still Standing
- Still Star-Crossed
- Stingray (UK, 1964)
- Stingray (US, 1985)
- Stir
- Stitchers
- Stoked
- Storage Hunters
- Storage Wars
- Storage Wars: Canada
- Storage Wars: Miami
- Storage Wars: New York
- Storage Wars: Texas
- Storefront Lawyers
- Storm Chasers
- Storm Hawks
- Storybook Squares
- Story of Yanxi Palace
- The Storyteller
- Strahan and Sara
- Strahan, Sara, and Keke
- Straightaway
- The Strain
- Strange Angel
- Strange Days at Blake Holsey High (aka Black Hole High)
- Strange Experiences
- Strange Love
- Strange Report
- Stranger Things
- Strangers and Brothers
- Strangers with Candy
- Strawberry Shortcake
- Strawberry Shortcake's Berry Bitty Adventures
- Strawberry Shortcake: Berry in the Big City
- Street Legal (Canada)
- Street Legal (New Zealand)
- Street Smarts
- The Streets of San Francisco
- Stressed Eric
- Strictly Come Dancing (South Africa)
- Strictly Come Dancing (UK)
- Strictly Come Dancing: It Takes Two (UK)
- Strike Back
- Strike Force
- Strike It Lucky (UK)
- Strike It Rich (1950)
- Strike It Rich (1986)
- Stroker and Hoop
- Strömsö
- Strong Medicine
- Stuck in the Middle
- Student Bodies
- Studio 7
- Studio 60 on the Sunset Strip
- Studio C
- Studio One
- Stupid Pet Tricks

=== SU ===
- Suburgatory
- The Substitute
- Suddenly Susan
- Succession
- Sugarfoot
- The Suite Life of Zack & Cody
- The Suite Life on Deck
- Suits
- Sukeban Deka
- Summer Camp Island
- Summer Heights High
- The Summer Hikaru Died
- Summer House (2006)
- Summer House (2017)
- Summerland
- The Sunday Comics
- Sunday NFL Countdown
- Sunday Night Baseball
- Sunday Night Football
- Sunday Night with Megyn Kelly
- Sunny Bunnies
- Sunny Day
- Sunset Paradise
- Sun Records
- Sunrise (UK)
- Sunshine (US)
- Sunshine (UK)
- Supa Strikas
- Supah Ninjas
- The Super
- Superboy
- Superbook
- Supercar (UK)
- Super Dave
- Superfan
- Super Friends
- Supergirl
- Super Gran (UK)
- Super Greed
- Super HxEros
- Superior Donuts
- Superjail!
- Super Jeopardy!
- SuperKitties
- Superman (1988)
- SuperMansion
- Superman: The Animated Series
- The Super Mario Bros. Super Show!
- Super Mario World
- Super Monsters
- Supermarket Sweep (UK)
- Supermarket Sweep (US)
- Supernanny
- Supernatural (UK)
- Supernatural (US)
- Supernoobs
- Super Password
- Super President
- Super Robot Monkey Team Hyperforce Go!
- Super Sábados
- Super Soul Sunday
- Superstars
- Superstars of Wrestling
- Superstore
- Supertrain
- Super Why!
- Super Wings
- Surfside Six
- Surprise Surprise (UK)
- The Surreal Life
- The Surreal Life: Fame Games
- Survivor
  - Survivor (US)
- Survivorman (Canada)
- Survivors (1975)
- Survivors (2008)
- The Susan Rosner Rovner Show
- Sutherland's Law (BBC 1973–76)

=== SW ===
- Swamp Thing
- The Swan
- Swans Crossing
- S.W.A.T. (1975)
- S.W.A.T. (2017)
- SWAT Kats: The Radical Squadron
- Swedish Dicks
- The Sweeney (UK)
- Sweet and Sour
- Sweet Home
- Sweet Life: Los Angeles
- Sweet Surrender
- Sweet Tooth
- Sweet Valley High
- Sweet/Vicious
- Swerved
- Swingtown
- Switch (1975) (US)
- Switch (2012) (UK)
- Switched at Birth
- The Swiss Family Robinson (US)
- Sword Art Online
- Sword of Freedom

=== SY ===
- Sydney to the Max
- Sylvester and Tweety Mysteries
- The Sympathizer
- Sym-Bionic Titan

Previous: List of television programs: Q-R Next: List of television programs: T
