= Randy to the Rescue =

- Genre: Reality
- Starring: Randy Fenoli
- Narrated by: Roger Craig Smith
- Country of origin: United States
- Original language: English
- No. of seasons: 2
- No. of episodes: 18

Production
- Executive producers: Sean Gallagher; Abby Greensfelder; Nicole Sorrenti; Jordana Starr
- Camera setup: Multiple
- Running time: 22 minutes
- Production company: Half Yard Productions

Original release
- Network: TLC
- Release: June 15, 2012 – August 2, 2013

Related
- Say Yes to the Dress; Say Yes to the Dress: Atlanta; Say Yes to the Dress: Bridesmaids; Say Yes to the Dress: Big Bliss; Say Yes to the Dress: Randy Knows Best

Randy to the Rescue is an American reality television series that aired on the TLC cable network, starting June 15, 2012. Each episode of the series shows Randy Fenoli as he helps brides pick out the perfect wedding dress for their special day. The show was a spin-off of the highly popular Say Yes to the Dress franchise. The series concluded on August 2, 2013 when it was not renewed for a third season.

== Cast ==
=== Randy Fenoli ===
Randy Fenoli is one of the directors for Kleinfeld Bridal in Manhattan, New York. In the series, Randy helps brides select dresses for their wedding day, regardless of their outrageous demands and requirements. In addition to fulfilling these, Randy travels nationwide to help the bride, instead of the bride traveling to New York.

== Episodes ==
Season	Episodes	Originally released	
Season	Episodes	First released	Last released
1	8	June 15, 2012	August 10, 2012
2	10	May 31, 2013	August 2, 2013

=== Season 1 (2012) ===
No. overall	No. in season	Title	Original release date
1	1	"Las Vegas"	June 15, 2012
2	2	"San Diego"	June 22, 2012
3	3	"New Orleans"	June 29, 2012
4	4	"Dallas"	July 6, 2012
5	5	"Cincinnati"	July 13, 2012
6	6	"Nashville"	July 20, 2012
7	7	"Boston"	August 3, 2012
8	8	"Minneapolis"	August 10, 2012

=== Season 2 (2013) ===
No. overall	No. in season	Title	Original release date
9	1	"Los Angeles"	May 31, 2013
10	2	"Oklahoma City"	June 7, 2013
11	3	"Denver"	June 14, 2013
12	4	"San Francisco"	June 21, 2013
13	5	"Seattle"	June 28, 2013
14	6	"Savannah"	July 5, 2013
15	7	"Chicago"	July 12, 2013
16	8	"Austin"	July 19, 2013
17	9	"Washington, D.C."	July 26, 2013
18	10	"Miami"	August 2, 2013

== Reception ==
Upon premiere, the series received mixed reviews. On a positive note, Common Sense Media stated that Randy "gives brides a confidence boost." while SideReel awarded the series 3.8/5 stars. Unlike its predecessor, the series was cancelled after two seasons.
