= Sidewalk (disambiguation) =

A sidewalk is a paved pedestrian way found chiefly in cities.

Sidewalk may also refer to:

== Music ==
- Sidewalk (album), 1984, by Australian band Icehouse, or the song of the same name
- Sidewalks (album), 2010, by Matt & Kim
- "Sidewalks" (The Weeknd song), 2016
- "Sidewalks" (Story of the Year song), 2004
- "Sidewalk", a song by Built to Spill from their 1999 album Keep It Like a Secret
- "Sidewalk", a song by Avail from their 1994 album Dixie
- Sidewalk Records, a 1960s music label

== Television ==
- Sidewalks Entertainment, an American talk show / variety television series
- Sidewalks: Video Nite, an American music video television series

== Other uses ==
- Amazon Sidewalk, a long-range wireless networking protocol
- Sidewalk Labs, Alphabet Inc.'s urban innovation organization
- Sidewalk (magazine), a British skateboarding magazine
- Sidewalk, a gay bar and restaurant in the Birmingham Gay Village
- Sidewalk.com, a former Microsoft-owned website
- Sidewalk, a non-fiction book about street vendors by Mitchell Duneier
- Sidewalk Moving Picture Festival, a film festival in Birmingham, Alabama

== See also ==
- Moving sidewalk, a slow conveyor belt that transports people horizontally or on an incline
- Moving Sidewalks, a 1960s psychedelic blues-rock band
