= Say Yes to the Dress: Randy Knows Best =

- Genre: Reality
- Narrated by: Roger Craig Smith
- Country of origin: United States
- Original language: English
- No. of seasons: 2
- No. of episodes: 14

Production
- Executive producers: Sean Gallagher; Abby Greensfelder
- Running time: 21 minutes
- Production company: Half Yard Productions

Original release
- Network: TLC
- Release: April 1, 2011 – January 25, 2013

Related
- Say Yes to the Dress: Atlanta; Say Yes to the Dress: Bridesmaids; Say Yes to the Dress: Big Bliss; Say Yes to the Dress; Randy to the Rescue

Say Yes to the Dress: Randy Knows Best is an American reality television series on TLC. It follows events at Kleinfeld Bridal in Manhattan. The series is hosted by Randy Fenoli, who also appears in the Say Yes to the Dress series and spin-offs, including one of his own, Randy to the Rescue. In Say Yes to the Dress: Randy Knows Best, Randy Fenoli helps brides find their perfect wedding dress. Fenoli, a fashion director at Kleinfield Bridal in Manhattan and a star of TLC's hit wedding shows, gives his expertise to brides on do's and don'ts in a top 10 format. In 2011, the TLC network announced that they would be building off of the popular franchise Say Yes to the Dress and that they would premier the eight-part series "Say Yes to the Dress: Randy Knows Best". Each half-hour episode stars Randy Fenoli offering his top ten tips on a variety of bridal related categories.

== Randy Fenoli ==
Fenoli is Kleinfeld's fashion director. In 2007, he debuted on television on the U.S. channel TLC with Say Yes To The Dress. Since 2011, he has hosted Say Yes to the Dress: Randy Knows Best. Fenoli has also designed his own bridal line.

== Episodes ==
=== Season 1 ===
- April 1, 2011: Top 10 Dresses for Every-Body
- April 8, 2011: Top 10 Dresses for Every Occasion
- April 15, 2011: Top 10 Biggest Bridal Mistake
- April 15, 2011: Top 10 Entourage No-No's
- July 1, 2011: Top 10 Big Budget Brides
- July 1, 2011: Top 10 Things to Know Before Buying a Dress
- October 21, 2011: Top 10 Men in a Bride's World
- October 28, 2011: Top 10 Most Outrageous Bridal Requests

=== Season 2 ===
- January 4, 2013: Top 10 Momma Dramas
- January 4, 2013: Top 10 Budget Busting Brides
- January 11, 2013: Top 10 All in the Family Moments
- January 11, 2013: Top 10 Classic Brides
- January 18, 2013: Top 10 Most Heartfelt Moments
- January 25, 2013: Top 10 Most Memorable Brides

== Say Yes to the Dress: Spin-offs ==
- Say Yes to the Dress: Atlanta (July–September 2010; July 2011–)
- Say Yes to the Dress: Bridesmaids
- Say Yes to the Dress: Monte's Take (July 2011 – February 2012)
- Say Yes to the Dress: Big Bliss (September–October 2010; April 2011–)
- Say Yes to the Dress: Randy Knows Best (April 2011–)
- Randy To The Rescue (June 2012–August 2013)
