= One Way Out =

One Way Out may refer to:

== Music ==
- One Way Out (The Allman Brothers Band album), the 2004 live album by The Allman Brothers Band
- One Way Out (Melissa Etheridge album), 2021
- "One Way Out" (song), the blues song recorded by Sonny Boy Williamson II, Elmore James, and The Allman Brothers Band

== Arts and entertainment ==
- One Way Out (film), the 1955 British crime drama film starring Jill Adams and Eddie Byrne
- One Way Out (2002 film), a 2002 crime drama starring James Belushi
- One Way Out (TV series), the Discovery Channel TV series featuring escape artist Jonathan Goodwin
- "One Way Out" (Andor), TV episode
- One Way Out, a 2019 crime thriller novel by British Indian writer A A Dhand
