= NorthSouth =

NorthSouth may refer to:

- NorthSouth Books
- NorthSouth Productions
