= Lovetown, USA =

American television series

- Genre: Documentary
- Starring: Kailen Rosenberg; Paul Carrick Brunson
- Country of origin: United States
- No. of seasons: 1
- No. of episodes: 8

Production
- Executive producers: Bruce Toms; Charlie DeBevoise; Izzie Pick Ashcroft; Jane Tranter; Mark Hickman; Rob Bagshaw
- Running time: 42 minutes
- Production companies: BBC Worldwide Productions; NorthSouth Productions

Original release
- Network: Oprah Winfrey Network
- Release: October 30, 2012 – January 15, 2013

Lovetown, USA is an American reality documentary television series on the Oprah Winfrey Network that premiered on August 19, 2012. Lovetown, USA follows the community in Kingsland, GA as they take on Oprah's challenge to become one loving community in 30 days.

== Episodes ==
No.	Title	Original release date	U.S. viewers (millions)
1	"Oprah's Love Experiment"	October 30, 2012	0.758
Oprah goes to Kingsland, GA and delivers them the challenge to focus on love for 30 days.
2	"Love & War"	November 6, 2012	0.243
The team gets to work on focusing on love and works with three dance studios. The love coaches also set-up six single citizens on dates.
3	"Love Overboard?"	November 13, 2012	0.250
The singles that hit it off enjoy a second date, and Paul attempts to fix the bond between neighbors.
4	"Indecent Proposal"	November 27, 2012	N/A
On another round of dates, one comes dressed inappropriately and other one becomes belligerently drunk. Sara Evans comes to town to assist the community on their mission.
5	"Rocky Road to Love"	December 4, 2012	N/A
The group of singles take a much needed road trip. Dan's becomes angry after his patience is tested. The local teens receive a gift of a lifetime. Franchesca and Charles decide to continue to nurture their new relationship.
6	"The Breakthrough"	December 11, 2012	N/A
Ron attempts to find love again, while Dan goes on an unannounced date. Paul uncovers some disturbing news.
7	"Sex, Love & Ministries"	January 1, 2013	N/A
Paul confesses to those who he thinks are being dishonest, and discovers the truth. Two churches still do not agree with each others views.
8	"Oprah Returns to Lovetown"	January 15, 2013	N/A
Paul assists the singles with their relationship woes while Kailen plans her wedding. Oprah comes back to Kingsland, GA to see the results of the experiment.
