= Randy Fenoli =

American television personality and fashion designer

- Born: January 30, 1964 (age 62); Mount Vernon, Illinois, US
- Occupations: Television presenter, fashion designer
- Years active: 1992–present
- Partner(s): Mete Kobal (2023-present; engaged)

Randy Fenoli is an American television presenter and fashion designer who is mainly known for his work on wedding dresses and his own TV show, Randy to the Rescue for two seasons and Say Yes to the Dress for over 22 seasons. He was the fashion director for the wedding dress store Kleinfeld Bridal from 2007 to 2012.

== Biography ==
Born in Mt. Vernon, Illinois, Fenoli grew up with a love of fashion and began sewing dresses when he was only nine years old, eventually expanding his efforts into the areas of make-up artistry, hair styling and entertainment. After winning the Miss Gay America competition in 1990, performing as Brandi Alexander, he used the prize money to enroll at New York's Fashion Institute of Technology. He was offered a job working for Vivian Dessy Diamond, of the Vivian Diamond company. Subsequently, his design experience paid off when he was offered a job at Kleinfeld. He is now an independent consultant.

He has been a fashion designer since 1992. In 2007, Fenoli made his television debut on the U.S. cable channel TLC with Say Yes To The Dress, where his wit and fashion sensibilities charmed viewers. Since 2011 he has hosted Say Yes to the Dress: Randy Knows Best, broadcast in Spain and Italy, and Randy to the Rescue.

In 2022, it was announced that Fenoli became godfather of the Discovery Princess cruise ship.

== Filmography ==
- 2007 – present: Say Yes to the Dress, TLC
- 2011–2013: Say Yes to the Dress: Randy Knows Best, TLC
- 2012–2016: Randy to the Rescue, TLC
- 2016: Say Yes To The Dress Benelux S1, TLC
- 2017: Say Yes To The Dress Benelux S2, TLC
- 2019-2020: Say Yes To The Dress America, TLC

== Bibliography ==
- Randy Fenoli (2012). It's All About the Dress. New York: Grand Central Publishing. ISBN 978-0-446-58507-1.
