= Double Divas =

2013 American reality TV series

- Genre: Reality
- Starring: Cynthia Richards; Molly Hopkins
- Country of origin: United States
- Original language: English
- No. of seasons: 2
- No. of episodes: 23

Production
- Executive producers: Charlie DeBevoise; Mark Hickman; Rob Sharenow; Gena McCarthy; Colleen Conway
- Running time: 20 minutes
- Production company: NorthSouth Productions

Original release
- Network: Lifetime
- Release: January 10 – September 24, 2013

Double Divas is an American reality television series on Lifetime that premiered on January 10, 2013. It chronicles the day-to-day operations at LiviRae Lingerie, a custom lingerie store located in Kennesaw, Georgia. Best friend duo Molly Hopkins and Cynthia Richards are the owners with Loren Schaffer as their apprentice. The second season premiered on August 6, 2013.

The series premiered in Australia on the Style Network on April 6, 2015.

== Episodes ==
Season	Episodes	Season premiere	Season finale
1	10	January 10, 2013	March 5, 2013
2	15	August 6, 2013	September 24, 2013

=== Season 1 (2013) ===
No. overall	No. in season	Title	Original release date	U.S. viewers (millions)
0	0	"The Gift of Lift"	January 10, 2013	1.49
1	1	"Cups Runneth Over"	January 10, 2013	1.18
2	2	"Fashion Show or Bust"	January 17, 2013	0.94
3	3	"Mother of Invention"	January 24, 2013	0.69
4	4	"The Great Pumpkin"	February 5, 2013	0.59
5	5	"Boobs on the Move"	February 12, 2013	0.79
6	6	"Tempest in a D-Cup"	February 19, 2013	1.07
7	7	"Bra-Maid of Honor"	February 26, 2013	1.26
8	8	"Get Your Girls Out There"	March 5, 2013	1.23
9	9	"Blondie's Last Stop"	March 5, 2013	1.09
10	10	"Bra Boot Camp for Boys"	March 5, 2013	1.09

=== Season 2 (2013) ===
No. overall	No. in season	Title	Original release date	U.S. viewers (millions)
11	1	"Rhythm and Boobs"	June 23, 2013	1.06
12	2	"Ride 'Em Cowgirl"	June 24, 2013	0.95
13	3	"Camo & Corsets"	July 1, 2013	0.91
14	4	"Safety First"	July 8, 2013	0.73
15	5	"Toilet Paper Bride"	July 15, 2013	1.03
16	6	"Into the Wild Nude Yonder"	July 22, 2013	1.00
17	7	"Director Divas"	July 29, 2013	0.85
18	8	"Motorcycle Mamas"	August 6, 2013	0.81
19	9	"Mer-Makeover"	August 13, 2013	0.92
20	10	"Atlanta Is Burning"	August 20, 2013	0.81
21	11	"Breast Friends"	August 27, 2013	0.94
22	12	"Vinyl and Ribbons and Fur, Oh My!"	September 3, 2013	0.87
23	13	"The Princess and the Pregnant Man"	September 10, 2013	N/A
24	14	"Guinea Pig-Skin"	September 17, 2013	0.78
25	15	"Divas Helping Divas"	September 24, 2013	0.73
