= Half Yard Productions =

American television production company

- Type: Subsidiary
- Industry: Television production
- Founded: May 2006; 20 years ago
- Founder: Abby Greensfelder; Sean Gallagher
- Headquarters: Bethesda, Maryland, United States
- Area served: Nationwide
- Parent: Red Arrow Studios (2014–2022); The North Road Company (2022–present)

Half Yard Productions is an American reality television production company based in Bethesda, Maryland. It specializes in unscripted, character-driven reality series, documentaries, and specials. It was founded in May 2006 by former Discovery Networks executives Abby Greensfelder and Sean Gallagher, and was part of German entertainment company Red Arrow Studios (now known as Seven.One Studios) until 2022, when Red Arrow was sold to The North Road Company. Half Yard Productions is best known for producing Say Yes to the Dress for TLC.

== History ==
Half Yard Productions was established in May 2006 when Abby Greensfelder, the former head of programming and development for Discovery Channel, and Sean Gallagher, the production and development chief for TLC, left their roles at Discovery Networks in order to found a new, independent production studio. During its formation, Half Yard Productions signed a deal with Discovery Networks which entailed "several series commitments."

In February 2014, the German entertainment and production distribution studio Red Arrow Entertainment Group (now Seven.One Studios), part of German broadcasting company ProSiebenSat.1 Media, acquired a majority stake in Half Yard Productions to breach its American unscripted production portfolio. Half Yard Productions became part of Red Arrow Entertainment Group, with Greensfelder and Gallagher continuing to lead Half Yard Productions as co-CEOs.

At the start of May 2018, Half Yard Productions formed a new unit dedicated to producing crime and investigation programming, hiring Sirens Media executive and crime producer Anne Rothwell.

In 2019, Greensfelder stepped down as CEO to form a new production company, Everywoman Studios. Gallagher also departed in 2020, stepping away from the television industry. Half Yard Productions' Executive Vice President of dDevelopment, Dirk Hoogstra, was promoted to CEO following Gallagher's exit.

In July 2021, Half Yard Productions signed a pact with Public School Productions to co-produce and co-develop programming dedicated to authentic, first-in-its-space content with rich and dynamic characters.

In July 2022, Peter Chernin, founder and CEO of The Chernin Group, acquired Red Arrow Studios for 200 million dollars. Half Yard Productions became a subsidiary of Chernin's new production and distribution studio, The North Road Company, alongside Chernin Entertainment and Words + Pictures.

In the summer of 2023, The North Road Company rolled out layoffs, looking to "right-size the business." That December, Half Yard Productions announced that its CCO Nicole Sorrenti, whom had joined Half Yard Productions back in 2007, and CEO Hoogstra had left the studio.

== Filmography ==
Title	Years	Network	Notes
Say Yes to the Dress	2007–present	TLC	
Jersey Couture	2010–2012	Oxygen	co-production with Magilla Entertainment
The Real Housewives of D.C.	2010	Bravo	
Say Yes to the Dress: Randy Knows Best	2011–2013	TLC	First spin-off to Say Yes to the Dress
Randy to the Rescue	2012–2013	TLC	Second spin-off to Say Yes to the Dress
Diggers	2013–2015	National Geographic	
100 Days of Summer	2014	Bravo	
Bloody Boston	2022	Reelz	
I Just Killed My Dad	2022	Netflix	
