= PrankvsPrank =

YouTube channel

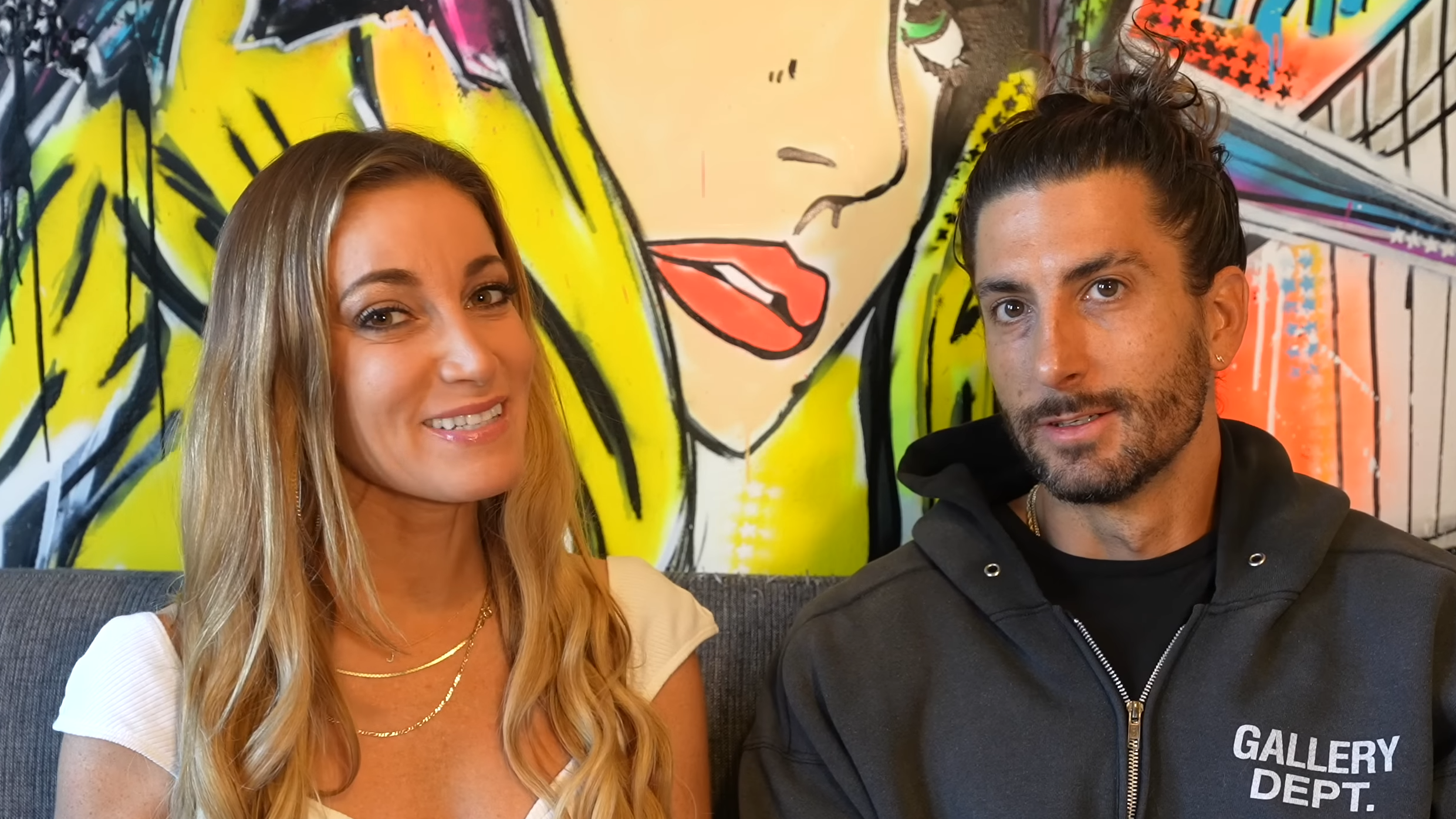
- Jennifer Smith and Jesse Wellens in 2023
- Born: Jesse Michael Wellens; Jennifer Smith
- Occupations: Pranksters; comedians; vloggers

YouTube information
- Channel: PrankvsPrank
- Years active: 2007–present
- Genres: Pranks; comedy
- Subscribers: 19.7 million (with both channels)
- Views: 4.9 billion (with both channels)
- Last updated: February 2, 2017

PrankvsPrank, also known as PvP, is a YouTube channel created by former couple Jesse Michael Wellens and Jennifer "Jeana" Smith. In 2007, the two began to play pranks on each other and post videos of the pranks on websites, eventually forming a channel on YouTube. They became one of the most-watched channels. The channel has more than 1.8 billion video views and more than 10.2 million subscribers as of February 2017. After Wellens and Smith split in May 2016, Smith became the sole user of the channel, renaming the channel to Jen Smith.

== History ==
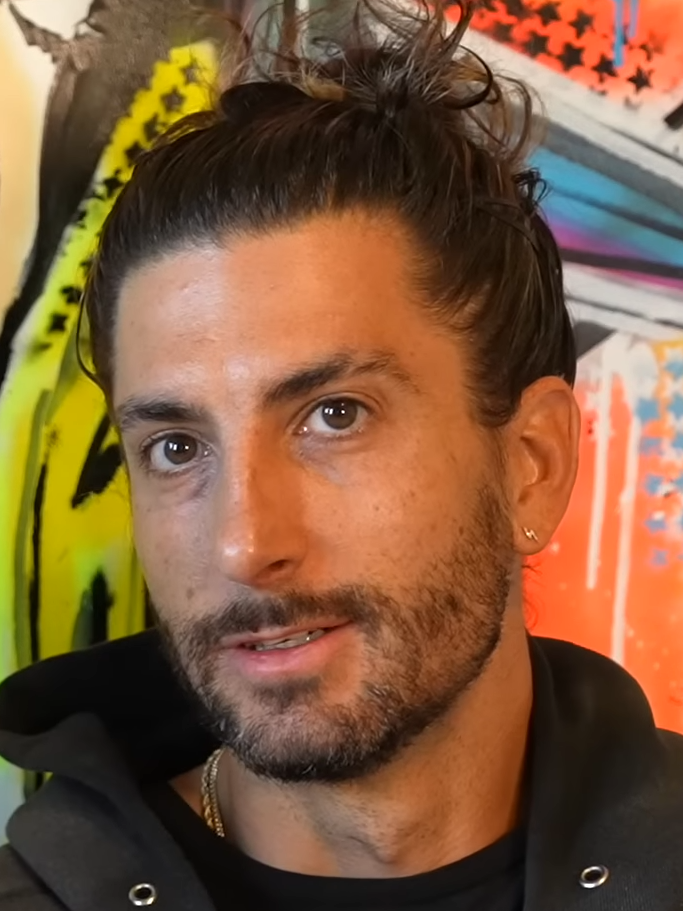
Jesse Wellens

Wellens had filmed Smith attempting the cinnamon challenge and posted a video on the Internet, starting the serial pranking of each other. The videos show how they prepare the pranks for each other and record their reaction afterwards.

In 2012, Wellens and Smith appeared as Spartan King Leonidas I and Queen Gorgo in the web series Epic Rap Battles of History, in season two, episode 2 "Master Chief vs. Leonidas".

On April 1, 2013, USA Today rated PrankvsPrank YouTube's best pranksters.

On September 25, 2013, Wellens (as "Chip Chocolate") released a rap song on iTunes called "Cookie Dance". Produced by Les Professionnels, the song peaked at #68 on the UK Singles Chart and was number one in Sweden for a couple of weeks.

On September 17, 2015, PrankvsPrank won the Streamy Award for the Best Prank Show.

In 2016, Wellens and Smith hosted a YouTube Red original series titled Prank Academy, where they taught celebrities how to pull off pranks and graded the individual outcomes. The series premiered on March 30, 2016, and concluded on July 20, 2016.

On April 11, 2016, PrankvsPrank won the Shorty Award for the Best YouTube Ensemble.

After Wellens and Smith split in May 2016, Wellens continued posting on PrankvsPrank as a solo effort, while Smith posted on BFvsGF.

== BFvsGF ==
Smith and Wellens also have a channel on YouTube called BFvsGF. On BFvsGF, they posted videos about their lives on a daily basis from 2012 until May 19, 2016. The videos often show them walking around Philadelphia, visiting New York City, or traveling with Contiki Tours. The videos also have frequent guest appearances by other YouTubers, including Louis Cole, Roman Atwood, Alli Speed, Andy Milonakis and Charles Trippy.

It was on this channel that Smith and Wellens introduced the character Chip Chocolate with the video "Fruit Assassin". BFvsGF has more than 9.3 million subscribers and 2.7 billion video views, as of February 2017.

On May 18, 2016, Wellens and Smith announced on BFvsGF they have decided to place their relationship on "hiatus" and they would be taking a break from vlogging for the foreseeable future. They cited relationship problems and stress from daily vlogging as factors for this break. Wellens announced he would be moving to New York, with Smith remaining in Philadelphia.

On March 5, 2019, Smith announced that she will be launching an online talk show on BFvsGF, titled Jenuine Talk, where she will discuss various real-life topics with guest stars, having shot two episodes over the winter.

== Personal life ==
Wellens lives in Los Angeles and Smith lives in New York City.

Wellens is of Ashkenazi Jewish, Belarusian, Croatian, British, and Dutch descent. He was raised Jewish and has stated he was bullied for his faith in high school.

Smith’s mother died of ovarian cancer when Smith was 16.

== Awards and nominations ==
Year	Award Show	Category	Result	Ref
2015	Streamy Award	Best Prank Show	Won	
2016	Shorty Award	Best YouTube Ensemble	Won	
