= Jersey Couture =

- Genre: Reality documentary
- Country of origin: United States
- Original language: English
- No. of seasons: 2
- No. of episodes: 23

Production
- Executive producers: Abby Greensfelder; Brian Flanagan; Jacqueline Cardillo; Laura Palumbo Johnson; Matthew Ostrom; Sean Gallagher
- Production companies: Half Yard Productions; Magilla Entertainment

Original release
- Network: Oxygen
- Release: June 1, 2010 – March 20, 2012

Jersey Couture is an American reality documentary series that premiered June 1, 2010 on Oxygen. The series follows the Scali family as they run their dress boutique, Diane & Co., located in Freehold, New Jersey and the personal lives of the owners along with the staff.

On February 7, 2012, the second season of Jersey Couture premiered.

== Prom Dress Incident ==
On Friday, May 20, 2011, Diane Scali, owner of the dress shop Diane & Co., made international headlines when she refused to issue a refund on a dress from a 16-year-old girl whose boyfriend and prom date died in a car accident just 2 weeks before her prom. Scali was quoted in the media as saying "It's not my fault her boyfriend died.", to boycott Diane & Co. and within 5 days had 15,000 fans worldwide supporting the teenager. Scali made headlines in newspapers and television from New York to Los Angeles and United Kingdom.

On Monday, May 23, Diane & Co. was the main subject of talk show radio angst as local and national radio programs discussed her choice to wage war on the young girl. In the end, after nearly a week long battle, which included the cast of the show, their publicist and lawyers, Diane & Co. refunded the $1,500 dress to the girls' father.

== Cast ==
- Diane Scali -- Diane is the owner of the dress shop, Diane & Co. Married to Sal—and mother to Kimberly, Christina, and Anthony—she sells dresses and, along with her daughters, designs custom gowns for clients.
- Kimberly "Kim" Gambale -- The oldest daughter, Kimberly helps manage the dress shop with her mother. Kimberly is co-creator of Diane & Co.’s Fluff Me Service, which provides "day of" pampering to clients at their special events. Kimberly is married and has 2 children(a daughter and a son).
- Christina "Chrissy" Scali -- The middle child, Christina is fresh from leaving her parents’ home. Testing the boundaries as a single woman in New Jersey, Christina’s love life is always a topic of conversation in the shop.
- Anthony Scali -- The youngest Scali, works as a DJ in a party planning business, Scali Entertainment. Anthony often offers advice and light-hearted teasing.
- Sal Scali -- Diane's husband. Along with Anthony, Sal provides a sounding board for the other staff members.
- Mac Duggal -- One of the shop's main dress suppliers whose store they visit in Chicago.

== Episodes ==
=== Season 1 (2010) ===
No.	Title	Original release date
1	"Dress, Drama, Action!"	June 1, 2010
2	"Chrissy's Supersweet 16"	June 8, 2010
3	"Jersey Goes Aspen"	June 15, 2010
4	"Fashion Tweak"	June 22, 2010
5	"Pageants and Passions"	June 29, 2010
6	"Prom Mania"	July 6, 2010
7	"Fame and Fashion"	July 13, 2010
8	"Should I Stay or Should I Go"	July 20, 2010

=== Season 2 (2012) ===
No.	Title	Original release date
1	"Say Yes to Excess"	February 7, 2012
2	"All My Dresses"	February 7, 2012
3	"Style Rivals"	February 14, 2012
4	"Diane's Way or the Highway"	February 21, 2012
5	"It's a Man, Baby"	February 21, 2012
6	"Diane's Way or the Highway"	February 28, 2012
7	"Big Sister Is Watching"	February 28, 2012
8	"Blinging Sexy Back"	March 6, 2012
9	"Jersey Brides"	March 6, 2012
10	"A Hard Sell"	March 13, 2012
11	"A Hard Sell"	March 13, 2012
12	"Weight Loss Beauties"	March 20, 2012
13	"Couture Challenge"	March 20, 2012
14	"Prom Mania!"	March 20, 2012
