= Big Spender (TV series) =

2006 American reality television series

Big Spender is an American reality television series on the A&E Network. Host Larry Winget visits people with financial problems, then advises them how to solve the problems and avoid repeating the same mistakes. The show is produced by NorthSouth Productions and premiered in July 2006.

People would rather talk about their sex life on TV than their finances, because there's no defense for the fact that you're just an idiot.

— Larry Winget, The Arizona Republic, Feb. 15, 2007

All episodes show:

- Winget visiting the individual(s) in crisis and assessing the situation
- An analysis of the financial problems (e.g., consumer debt, overspending)
- A "contract" of required changes, which the individual(s) must discuss and sign
- Scenes of the individual(s) following or departing from the agreed-upon changes
- A return visit from Winget to examine whether the recommended changes were made

A writer for The Arizona Republic described Winget's style as "blunt" and "quite funny." Discussing Big Spender, the writer noted, "Every Saturday night, he can be seen berating people who make lousy financial choices." Common Sense Media reviewer Pam Gelman lauded the educational information, but said Winget "uses a form of tough love that is verbally harsh, caustic, and confrontational" and expressed the opinion that psychological counseling was a missing element from the show. Jane Thompson of Northwest Herald wrote, "Apparently, there's a population of people out there who believe dog strollers and $1,000 fanny packs are essential to survival, despite their proximity to financial ruin. You should be awash in smug superiority after watching Big Spender."

Winget has commented on the difficulty of finding participants willing to expose their financial difficulties on national television. The first season's participants all were drawn from the south Florida area, but producers planned to recruit nationally for the second season.

The show lasted only one season.
