= Lori Allen (businesswoman) =

American businessperson, television personality and author

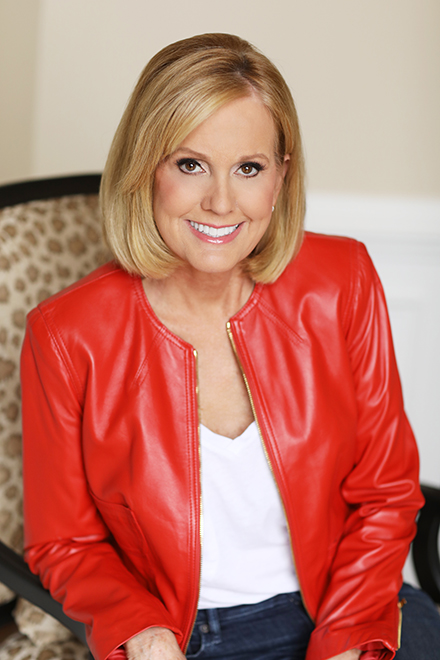
- Born: Chattanooga, Tennessee
- Occupation(s): Businessperson, television personality, author
- Known for: Breast cancer awareness
- Television: Say Yes to the Dress: Atlanta
- Children: 2
- Website: loriallen.com

Lori Allen is an American businessperson, television personality, and author best known for her appearances on Say Yes to the Dress: Atlanta.

She is the founder of Bridals by Lori and an advocate for breast cancer awareness.

== Career ==
In 1980, Lori Allen established the bridal salon, Bridals by Lori. In 2010, she began starring alongside bridal consultant Monte Durham in the reality television series, Say Yes to the Dress: Atlanta. Allen uses the show as a platform to advocate for breast cancer awareness. In April 2019, Allen tripped while filming a promo of Say Yes to the Dress Atlanta, leaving her with two cracked ribs, broken wrists, a broken nose, a concussion, and black eyes.

== Personal life ==
Allen is married to Eddie Allen. The couple have a son, Cory, and a daughter, Mollie Surratt. In 2012, she had a double mastectomy and several surgeries to treat her breast cancer.

== Selected works ==
- Allen, Lori (2020). Say Yes to What's Next: How to Age with Elegance and Class While Never Losing Your Beauty and Sass!. Thomas Nelson. ISBN 978-0-7852-3414-2.
