= List of Wrecked: Life in the Crash Lane episodes =

Wrecked: Life in the Crash Lane is an American television series that airs on Speed TV. It is a documentary about the daily lives of tow truck operators that work for the O'Hare Towing Service in Chicago, Illinois. The series premiered on July 17, 2008, and as of September 13, 2009, 40 episodes have been broadcast spanning 2 seasons.

The first and second seasons have consisted of 20 episodes each.

== Series overview ==
Season	Episodes	Originally released		DVD release date
Season	Episodes	First released	Last released	DVD release date
1	20	July 17, 2008	November 27, 2008	November 30, 2008
2	20	May 21, 2009	September 10, 2009	September 10, 2009

== Episodes ==
=== Season 1 (2008) ===
Season one aired between July 17, 2008, and November 27, 2009. "Series #" refers to the episode number in relation to the entire series, while "Episode #" refers to the episode number in the season.

No. overall	No. in season	Title	Original release date
1	1	"I Just Need a Good Wreck"	July 17, 2008
O'Hare Towing's Bill Gratzianna and his team of drivers use their knowledge to keep the roadways of Chicago clear.
2	2	"Dominating the Market"	July 17, 2008
A tandem trailer bottoms out while trying to avoid a crash, a tractor trailer wedges itself into a tunnel, an 18 wheeler carrying 42 tons cargo gets stuck on a mound of ice, and O'Hare's owners argue about the cost of new construction.
3	3	"Old Dogs, New Tricks"	July 24, 2008
A driver wraps a car around a pole, a semi filled with paper gets stuck in the mud on the railroad tracks, an overloaded dump truck flips, and Bill is shown who's boss by his daughter.
4	4	"Accidents Happen"	July 31, 2008
Joey and Tony must remove a large crane from ravine, a three-car crash leaves Jorge and Jeff very busy, and the crew is in a race against time to clean up after a truck spills its cargo in the middle of the night.
5	5	"White Means Green"	August 7, 2008
A blizzard makes the lives of O'Hare workers hard as they handle tougher and riskier tows and recoveries.
6	6	"Fire and Ice"	August 14, 2008
A semi drives off the road and jackknifes into a ditch, a flatbed carrying heavy cargo ices over, an angry ex gets revenge, a major fire in a tractor trailer destroys the truck, while a new safety manager takes charge and annoys the crew.
7	7	"Under the Wire"	August 21, 2008
A cement truck flips onto its side, a semi gets stuck under a low overpass, a dump truck collapses after it breaks its axle, and O'Hare employees deal with angry customers.
8	8	"On Top of the Game"	August 28, 2008
The O'Hare employees must deal with a car smashing into the front of a house during a practice drill, a semi getting stuck in the mud, fixing a semi with a broken axle, all in the cold, while Bill and Joey shop for new trucks in warm, sunny Florida.
9	9	"Off Roading in Chicago"	September 4, 2008
A garbage truck flips over on an exit ramp, one operator has to deal with three accidents in one hour, a pickup truck gets stuck on railroad tracks, and a driver must redeem himself after wrecking his service truck.
10	10	"Keep on Trucking"	September 11, 2008
A tractor trailer falls to pieces after making a hard turn, a truck gets stuck in the mud, Bill has fun crushing cars, and a pair of semis are bogged down in the mud.
11	11	"False Alarms"	September 18, 2008
Joey is hunting for a big wreck, but he is beaten to the punch until a boat flounders in Lake Michigan.
12	12	"Two Brothers, One Showdown"	September 25, 2008
A bobcat flips into a muddy ditch, a motor home is destroyed, a guardrail is crumpled after being hit by a semi, and Bill and Joey compete to see who can lose the most weight.
13	13	"Bill Goes Stir Crazy"	October 2, 2008
A truck slams into the roof of a viaduct and almost falls over, Tryke saves a forklift, a tractor trailer gets bent out of shape, and Marci causes Bill to go over the edge after she leaves town.
14	14	"Pain in the Glass"	October 9, 2008
After Bill's arm is cut by a shard of glass, he goes right back into the field to clean up a wrecked glass truck.
15	15	"School's in Session"	October 15, 2008
Joey frees a stranded semi, then returns to the shop to help Bill teach a course on operating a heavy duty tow truck.
16	16	"Family Business"	October 30, 2008
A trailer is wedged under a railroad bridge; one of the operators discusses the deaths of his parents.
17	17	"And the Winner Is?"	November 6, 2008
The O'Hare team get ready for the annual Illinois Tow Show, where drivers compete for the title of best wrecker in the state.
18	18	"The Big Move"	November 13, 2008
O'Hare Towing moves to a new location, but a problem with the phone system threatens to shut them down.
19	19	"All Nighter"	November 27, 2008
The O'Hare crew battles the rain and darkness to complete the hardest recovery of the year.
20	20	"Wall of the Fallen"	November 27, 2008
Bill and Marci pay their respects to the tow truck operators who have sacrificed their lives, and are commemorated at a ceremony.

=== Season 2 (2009) ===
Season two aired between May 21, 2009, and September 10, 2009. "Series #" refers to the episode number in relation to the entire series, while "Episode #" refers to the episode number in the season.

No. overall	No. in season	Title	Original release date
21	1	"Thanksgiving"	May 21, 2009
A fuel tanker gets stuck on an interstate ramp and a semi skids off the highway landing sideways into a ditch, delaying the crew's Thanksgiving dinner.
22	2	"Hogs"	May 21, 2009
A livestock truck carrying 150 hogs collides head on with a pick up truck.
23	3	"Joe, Terminal Manager"	May 28, 2009
A tractor trailer loses control and rolls over an on-ramp, and an overseas container slides down a slick road and rolls over at an intersection.
24	4	"The Ice Storm Cometh"	May 28, 2009
Two tractor trailers collide head on; a vehicle slides straight into a ditch and a Honda sedan slides off the road into a neighbor's yard.
25	5	"Slaying the Dragon"	June 4, 2009
A container truck full of cardboard tips over on the highway; Tony and Jay break Tryke's truck and a semi gets stuck in a loading dock.
26	6	"Marci's the Boss"	June 4, 2009
A tractor trailer loses control and rolls over an on-ramp; an overseas container slides down a slick road and rolls over at an intersection and Bill leaves town leaving Marci to man the shop.
27	7	"The Blizzard"	June 11, 2009
A 40-ton rig slides over into a ditch, an SUV rolls off the highway and Jay, Keith, Don and TJ winch out victims of the storm.
28	8	"Coldest Day of the Year"	June 11, 2009
Dispatch gets into a frenzy as slick roads cause a five-car pile-up and a jackknifed tractor trailer blocks an off ramp, while all the drivers are out on calls for dead vehicles.
29	9	"Odd Jobs"	June 18, 2009
It's not a typical day of rescues for the crew at O'Hare when a pedestrian bridge gets stuck over an icy pond and a 4500 lb. helicopter must be transported to a nearby facility.
30	10	"It's a Dangerous Job"	June 25, 2009
A truck breaks down on a bridge, a fuel tanker starts to smoke and leak in mid-transport, a semi plows over an electrical light post, a semi crashes into a wall on the highway and a 200,000 pound crane breaks down on a city street.
31	11	"Code Red"	July 2, 2009
A semi is stuck under a bridge after a wheel breaks, a box truck has a head-on collision and three burned cars are towed.
32	12	"Snow Angels"	July 16, 2009
A two-car collision leaves one buried in the snow; two trucks are stuck on an icy slope and a pickup plunges into a river.
33	13	"Stuck in the Mud"	July 23, 2009
A roof cave in leaves a car trapped inside a garage; an expensive sports car is carefully transported and several cars are winched out of muddy driveways.
34	14	"The Windy City"	July 30, 2009
An overseas container is blown over the side of a highway, a 40-ton crane sinks into a deep muddy sinkhole, and a 5-ton semi is stuck in the soft thawing ground.
35	15	"Rookies"	August 6, 2009
Every year, O'Hare breaks in a class of rookie drivers. They're put to the test right away, as Bill leads them to a roll over in a freight yard, and later they square off in a towing skills competition.
36	16	"Jane Runs the Show"	August 13, 2009
Bill and Marci head out of town, living Bill's sister Jane in charge of O'Hare. The calls roll in, including a cargo van that has fallen off a lift, and a tricky winch out.
37	17	"Friday the 13"	August 20, 2009
It's Friday the 13, and O'Hare is haunted by freak occurrences. Two calls come in simultaneously, and Marci's birthday celebration is interrupted by a shocking disturbance.
38	18	"First Day of Spring"	August 27, 2009
Spring finally comes to Chicago, and the warm weather means muddy terrain. Bill and the Boys take on a machine load shift, while Tryke tackles a dump truck.
39	19	"The Biggest and the Baddest"	September 3, 2009
The Gratziannas discuss the worst wrecks of the past season.
40	20	"Death Defying and Deadly"	September 10, 2009
The season finale counts down the most treacherous, danger packed recoveries that O'Hare has faced.
