= Say Yes to the Dress =

American reality television series

- Genre: Reality
- Narrated by: Roger Craig Smith
- Country of origin: United States
- Original language: English
- No. of seasons: 23
- No. of episodes: 337 (list of episodes)

Production
- Executive producer: Grace Inge
- Camera setup: Multiple
- Running time: 22 minutes
- Production company: Half Yard Productions

Original release
- Network: TLC
- Release: October 12, 2007 – May 17, 2025

Related
- Say Yes to the Dress: Atlanta; Say Yes to the Dress: Canada; Say Yes to the Dress: Ireland; Say Yes to the Dress: UK; Say Yes to the Dress: Lancashire; Say Yes to the Dress: Bridesmaids; Say Yes to the Dress: Big Bliss; Say Yes to the Dress: Randy Knows Best; Randy to the Rescue; Say Yes to the Dress: Benelux; Say Yes to the Dress: India

Say Yes to the Dress is an American reality television series on TLC which follows events at Kleinfeld Bridal in Manhattan, New York. The series shows the progress of individual sales associates, managers, and fitters at the store, along with profiling brides as they search for the perfect wedding dress. Common themes include overwhelming advice of friends and family, the ability of the "perfect dress" to help a bride overcome personal difficulty, struggle with weight and body image concerns, and the challenge of staying in budget, especially in the case of dresses by Kleinfeld's exclusive designer, Pnina Tornai. Dresses sold on the show range from $1,300 to $40,000.

== Cast ==
=== Mara Urshel ===
Mara Urshel is one of the co-owners of Kleinfeld. Earlier in her career in the retail industry, she served as senior vice president and general merchandise manager at Saks Fifth Avenue. She worked there for twenty years. After she left Saks, she was employed by Casual Corner and Geoffrey Beene Company in executive management positions. She then purchased the Kleinfeld Bridal store with Ronald Rothstein and Wayne Rogers on July 9, 1999.

=== Ronald Rothstein ===
Ronald (Ronnie) Rothstein is one of the co-owners of Kleinfeld. He was successful academically; he graduated from Wharton School at the University of Pennsylvania in 1964 and received his law degree from the University of Miami in 1968. He then became a member of the Florida Bar. In 1976, he started his own consumer products company named Oh Dawn, but after eight years, he sold Oh Dawn to an American Stock Exchange company. He did however stay on in an executive capacity for several more years. On July 9, 1999, he purchased the Kleinfeld Bridal store with Mara Urshel and Wayne Rogers.

=== Randy Fenoli ===
Randy Fenoli was the Fashion Director for Kleinfeld. He was born in Mt. Vernon, Illinois, and grew up with a love of fashion. He began sewing dresses when he was only nine years old. When he got older, he branched out into the areas of make-up artistry, hair styling, and entertainment. He then enrolled with the New York's Fashion Institute of Technology. Later, he was offered a job working for Paul Diamond of The Diamond Collection. He was then offered a job at Kleinfeld where he worked until 2012. He is now an independent consultant.

=== Dorothy Silver ===
Dorothy Silver is the Director of Sales and Merchandising for Kleinfeld. She began her career in New York as a floor manager at Bonwit Teller, but she has spent the majority of her twenty-five years in the retail industry at Kleinfeld. She works alongside Nicole Sacco and Joan Roberts.

=== Nicole Sacco ===
Nicole Sacco is the Director of Fittings and Sales at Kleinfeld. She has worked there for thirteen years and has many responsibilities, primarily helping consultants with their clients, whether it's finding a dress, closing the sale, or just making sure the client is happy. She works alongside Dorothy Silver and Joan Roberts.

=== Nitsa Glezelis ===
Nitsa Glezelis is the Director of Alterations at Kleinfeld. She was born in Kos, Greece, and has been in the retail industry since she was twelve years old. She has worked at Kleinfeld for eighteen years. She works alongside Vera Skenderis.

=== Joan Roberts ===
Joan Roberts is the Director of Sales/Bridal Manager at Kleinfeld. Before coming to Kleinfeld, she had worked in the retail industry for twenty five years. She works alongside Nicole Sacco and Dorothy Silver.

=== Camille Coffey ===
Camille Coffey is one of the several bridal consultants at Kleinfeld. She was first introduced to Kleinfeld when she was shopping for a dress to wear to her son's wedding. She applied for a job and has been working there ever since.

=== Vera Skenderis ===
Vera Skenderis is the Alterations Manager at Kleinfeld. She was born in Athens, Greece. She has been working in the retail industry for thirty-four years. She works alongside Nitsa Glezelis.

=== Audrey Pisani ===
Audrey Pisani is one of the several bridal consultants at Kleinfeld. She was born in Brooklyn and has worked in the retail industry for twenty years. Fifteen of those years have been spent working in bridal wear.

=== Keasha Rigsby ===
Keasha Rigsby is one of the several bridal consultants at Kleinfeld. She has been working in the retail industry for fifteen years. Six of those years have been spent working in bridal wear. She was first introduced to Kleinfeld when she was shopping for wedding dresses with her cousin. She met one of the co-owners, Ronnie Rothstein, applied for a job, and has been working there ever since. Keasha has not appeared on Say Yes to the Dress since the January 2011 season. She will be appearing on a new show entitled Keasha's Perfect Dress on the Canadian Slice network. This show will follow Keasha as she opens a new bridal salon.

=== Debbie Asprea ===
Debbie Asprea is one of the several bridal consultants at Kleinfeld. She has been working in the retail industry for eighteen years. She has been with Kleinfeld for fifteen of those eighteen years. She attributes her love of fashion to her father, who was a dress contractor.

== Episodes ==
Season	Episodes	Originally released	
Season	Episodes	First released	Last released
1	6	October 12, 2007	November 16, 2007
2	24	July 15, 2008	December 26, 2008
3	18	March 6, 2009	July 31, 2009
4	19	September 11, 2009	December 18, 2009
5	24	April 23, 2010	July 30, 2010
6	18	January 7, 2011	April 8, 2011
7	18	October 7, 2011	December 30, 2011
8	18	June 15, 2012	August 17, 2012
9	19	December 28, 2012	March 1, 2013
10	18	August 16, 2013	November 1, 2013
11	18	February 21, 2014	May 23, 2014
12	17	October 10, 2014	December 19, 2014
13	18	March 6, 2015	June 5, 2015
14	20	March 4, 2016	June 24, 2016
15	16	March 4, 2017	July 15, 2017
16	11	January 6, 2018	March 31, 2018
17	12	January 12, 2019	March 9, 2019
18	9	July 20, 2019	September 14, 2019
19	9	July 11, 2020	September 12, 2020
20	11	July 17, 2021	September 25, 2021
21	6	July 9, 2022	August 13, 2022
22	6	March 4, 2023	April 8, 2023
23	7	April 5, 2025	May 17, 2025

== Spinoffs ==
- Say Yes to the Dress: Atlanta (July–September 2010; July 2011–April 2020) is the first spinoff, which focuses on Bridals by Lori, a bridal shop in Atlanta, Georgia. Other than the shop, staff and production company (NorthSouth Productions produced the Atlanta series), the elements are the same as the original series. The Atlanta series itself also led to two spinoffs:
  - Say Yes to the Dress: Bridesmaids (July 2011–August 2013) is a spinoff focused on bridesmaid dresses and the bridesmaid showroom at Bridals by Lori.
  - Say Yes to the Dress: Monte's Take (July 2011 – February 2012) is a podcast hosted by Monte Durham, the bridal image consultant at Bridals by Lori; and TLC Interactive Producer Candace Keener. The weekly podcast provides listeners wedding tips and tricks.
  - Say Yes to the Dress: Big Bliss (September–October 2010; April–December 2011) is the second spin-off. The shop, staff, venue and producers are the same as the original series, except that all of Kleinfeld's clientele on this program are brides that are plus-sized.
- Say Yes to the Dress: Randy Knows Best (April 2011–August 2013): Randy Fenoli, Kleinfeld's fashion director, uses top ten lists and past episode clips to share his tips on a variety of bridal categories.
- Say Yes to the Dress: The Big Day (2011–2016)
- Randy to the Rescue (June 2012–August 2013): Randy Fenoli travels across the country where lucky brides-to-be get a special consultation with Randy, where he will give a few pointers on how to improve their bridal style.
- Say Yes to the Dress: Since the Big Day (2014)
- Say Yes to the Dress: Canada (2015–2016; known in the US as Say Yes to the Dress: Northern Edition)
- Say Yes to the Dress: Australia (2016): An international adaptation of the format on TLC Australia, featuring couture wedding gown designer Adam Dixon. The series is the first local production on the channel.
- Say Yes to the Dress: UK (2016): The second international adaptation that premiered on TLC UK
- Say Yes to the Dress: Ireland (2017) which premiered on RTÉ 2.
- Say Yes to the Dress: Asia (2017) was also created for TLC Asia, shot in Malaysia with Malaysian hosts, featuring 18 Southeast Asian women and their dresses.
- Say Yes to the Dress: Benelux
- Say Yes: Wedding SOS (2018) is a wedding makeover spin-off series focusing on transforming couples who have let themselves go.
- Say Yes to the Vegas Dress (2018; hosted by David Emanuel)
- Say Yes to the Dress: Spain (2018; hosted by Boris Izaguirre)
- Say Yes to the Dress: Denmark (2018)
- Say Yes to the Dress: Lancashire (2019–2021; hosted by Gok Wan; known in the US as Say Yes to the Dress: England)
- Say Yes to the Dress: Finland (2019)
- Say Yes to the Dress: America (January 2020): A 10-episode event series that featured couples representing each U.S. state, Puerto Rico, and Washington, D.C., and concluded with a mass wedding in New York City with all 52 couples, officiated by Fenoli.
- Say Yes to the Dress: Poland (2020, 2022; hosted by Gok Wan)
- Say Yes to the Dress: India (2021)
- Say Yes to the Dress: In Sickness and in Health (2021 three-part special)
- Say Yes to the Dress: Dubai (2022; also known as Say Yes to the Dress: Arabia)
