= Wrecked: Life in the Crash Lane =

- Genre: Reality
- Starring: Bill Gratzianna; Marci Gratzianna; Joey Gratzianna; Mike Trykoski; Jamisen Ticzkus; Dwight Lee, Julio Cruz
- Narrated by: Geoff Proud, David Bryson
- No. of seasons: 2
- No. of episodes: 40 (list of episodes)

Production
- Running time: 22 minutes

Original release
- Network: Speed TV
- Release: July 17, 2008 – September 10, 2009

Wrecked: Life in the Crash Lane is an American reality television series that was produced by NorthSouth Productions for the Speed Channel. The show followed the O'Hare Towing Service's owners and tow truck operators, focusing primarily on vehicle recoveries throughout the Chicago metropolitan area. The show focuses on O'Hare's heavy-duty, 25–60-ton tow trucks, performing recoveries on semi-trailer trucks and other large vehicles. Speed ceased being available to most American viewers as a standalone network with its own original programming on August 17, 2013, when it was replaced by the general-interest sports network Fox Sports 1.

== Premise ==
Bill and Marci Gratzianna, the owners of O'Hare Towing Service, sent in a tape showing O'Hare's operation to the production company only after his wife convinced him on the idea of the show. Bill decided to do the show because "it would help his company and give his drivers the recognition they deserve."

The first season premiered on July 17, 2008. The second season began on May 21, 2009. National Geographic Channel begin airing Season 1 on February 21, 2009. The second season of Wrecked aired as part of Speed's Big Block Thursday lineup with Pinks All Out and Jacked.
