= List of Say Yes to the Dress episodes =

The following is a list of episodes of the TLC reality television series, Say Yes to the Dress.

== Series overview ==
Season	Episodes	Originally released	
Season	Episodes	First released	Last released
1	6	October 12, 2007	November 16, 2007
2	24	July 15, 2008	December 26, 2008
3	18	March 6, 2009	July 31, 2009
4	19	September 11, 2009	December 18, 2009
5	24	April 23, 2010	July 30, 2010
6	18	January 7, 2011	April 8, 2011
7	18	October 7, 2011	December 30, 2011
8	18	June 15, 2012	August 17, 2012
9	19	December 28, 2012	March 1, 2013
10	18	August 16, 2013	November 1, 2013
11	18	February 21, 2014	May 23, 2014
12	17	October 10, 2014	December 19, 2014
13	18	March 6, 2015	June 5, 2015
14	20	March 4, 2016	June 24, 2016
15	16	March 4, 2017	July 15, 2017
16	11	January 6, 2018	March 31, 2018
17	12	January 12, 2019	March 9, 2019
18	9	July 20, 2019	September 14, 2019
19	9	July 11, 2020	September 12, 2020
20	11	July 17, 2021	September 25, 2021
21	6	July 9, 2022	August 13, 2022
22	6	March 4, 2023	April 8, 2023
23	7	April 5, 2025	May 17, 2025

== Episodes ==
=== Season 1 (2007) ===
No. overall	No. in season	Title	Original release date
1	1	"Here Comes the Bridal Salon/Three Times a Bride"	October 12, 2007
2	2	"Rocking the Dress/I Do or I Don't"	October 19, 2007
3	3	"That's Not My Dress/Bridal Breakdown"	October 26, 2007
4	4	"Lucky in Love/Wedding Dress Blues"	November 2, 2007
5	5	"To Buy or Not to Buy/What a Girl Wants"	November 9, 2007
6	6	"Italian Dressing/Here Comes the Groom"	November 16, 2007

=== Season 2 (2008) ===
No. overall	No. in season	Title	Original release date
7	1	"Here Comes the Bride Again--and Again"	July 15, 2008
8	2	"Bridal BFFs"	July 22, 2008
9	3	"Mother Knows Best"	July 29, 2008
10	4	"I Do--Redux"	August 5, 2008
11	5	"Daddy's Little Girl"	August 12, 2008
12	6	"Bridal Blow Out"	August 29, 2008
13	7	"Runway Bridal"	September 5, 2008
14	8	"Every Bride Counts"	September 12, 2008
15	9	"Grooms in Gowns"	September 19, 2008
16	10	"What a Bride Wants"	September 26, 2008
17	11	"Double the Trouble"	October 3, 2008
18	12	"It's Always Something"	October 10, 2008
19	13	"It's My Wedding, But Don't Tell the Bridesmaid"	November 21, 2008
20	14	"One is Not Enough"	November 21, 2008
21	15	"To Have And To Hold...The Dress"	November 28, 2008
22	16	"Ciao and Cheerio"	November 28, 2008
23	17	"I'm Not the Problem"	December 5, 2008
24	18	"Bridal Nightmares"	December 5, 2008
25	19	"Under Pressure"	December 12, 2008
26	20	"Emotions Run Wild"	December 12, 2008
27	21	"Second Chances"	December 19, 2008
28	22	"That's My Dress!"	December 19, 2008
29	23	"Daddy Knows Best"	December 26, 2008
30	24	"Time to Cut the Cord"	December 26, 2008

=== Season 3 (2009) ===
No. overall	No. in season	Title	Original release date
31	1	"Changes and Challenges"	March 6, 2009
32	2	"In My Opinion"	March 6, 2009
33	3	"Once Upon a Dress"	March 13, 2009
34	4	"Bridal Wave"	March 20, 2009
35	5	"Playing Dress Up"	April 3, 2009
36	6	"The Dress Ties that Bind"	April 10, 2009
37	7	"Seeing Red"	April 17, 2009
38	8	"Hot Dresses, Cold Feet"	April 24, 2009
39	9	"There's A First For Everything"	May 1, 2009
40	10	"The Art of Negotiation"	May 8, 2009
41	11	"Getting in the Spirit"	May 15, 2009
42	12	"Second Time Around"	June 5, 2009
43	13	"Two For One"	June 19, 2009
44	14	"Missing Mom"	June 26, 2009
45	15	"Clicking with Brides"	July 10, 2009
46	16	"Family Dynamics"	July 17, 2009
47	17	"Indecisive Brides"	July 24, 2009
48	18	"Season 3 Finale: Goals"	July 31, 2009

=== Season 4 (2009) ===
No. overall	No. in season	Title	Original release date
49	1	"Overbooked"	September 11, 2009
50	2	"Practically Family"	September 11, 2009
51	3	"Going the Extra Mile"	September 18, 2009
52	4	"Veterans vs. Rookies"	September 18, 2009
53	5	"Ready or Not"	September 25, 2009
54	6	"100 Dresses and Counting"	October 2, 2009
55	7	"Voice of Reason"	October 9, 2009
56	8	"The Blowout Sale"	October 9, 2009
57	9	"She's a Vision"	October 16, 2009
58	10	"Plan B"	October 23, 2009
59	11	"Moms and Daughters"	October 30, 2009
60	12	"Two to Say I Do"	November 6, 2009
61	13	"The Price of Beauty"	November 13, 2009
62	14	"Family Support"	November 20, 2009
63	15	"Nightmares and Dreams"	November 27, 2009
64	16	"Princess Brides"	December 4, 2009
65	17	"Daddy's Little Girl"	December 11, 2009
66	18	"Cinderella Comes in All Sizes"	December 18, 2009
67	19	"Seeing Eye to Eye"	December 18, 2009

=== Season 5 (2010) ===
No. overall	No. in season	Title	Original release date
68	1	"Anything Goes.. in Bridal"	April 23, 2010
69	2	"The Cardinal Rules"	April 23, 2010
70	3	"Wallet Woes"	April 30, 2010
71	4	"Going Bridal"	April 30, 2010
72	5	"Family Ties"	May 7, 2010
73	6	"Dress Distress"	May 7, 2010
74	7	"Randy to the Rescue"	May 14, 2010
75	8	"Mama Drama"	May 21, 2010
76	9	"The Entourage"	June 4, 2010
77	10	"Top 10 Dress Dramas"	June 4, 2010
78	11	"Top 10 Unforgettable Moments"	June 11, 2010
79	12	"Struggling to Commit"	June 11, 2010
80	13	"Dress Mates"	June 18, 2010
81	14	"Fantasy Unhinged"	June 18, 2010
82	15	"Top 10 Pickiest Brides"	June 25, 2010
83	16	"All in the Family"	June 25, 2010
84	17	"Top 10 Families"	July 2, 2010
85	18	"Man Tears"	July 2, 2010
86	19	"Randy's Top 10 Dresses"	July 9, 2010
87	20	"Fit for a Fantasy"	July 9, 2010
88	21	"The Path to the Dress"	July 16, 2010
89	22	"Love Connection"	July 23, 2010
90	23	"Second Time Around"	July 23, 2010
91	24	"In The Spotlight"	July 30, 2010
Guest: Rachael Biester and Paul Teutul Jr. from American Chopper

=== Season 6 (2011) ===
No. overall	No. in season	Title	Original release date
92	1	"The First Dress Syndrome"	January 7, 2011
93	2	"Best Laid Plans"	January 7, 2011
94	3	"The Group Calls It"	January 14, 2011
95	4	"Dad Knows Best"	January 21, 2011
96	5	"Beat the Dress"	January 21, 2011
97	6	"Torn Between Two Styles"	January 28, 2011
98	7	"Sticker Shock"	February 4, 2011
99	8	"Secrets and Surprises"	February 11, 2011
100	9	"Mom's Way or the Highway"	February 18, 2011
101	10	"Bride, Interrupted"	February 18, 2011
102	11	"Double or Nothing"	February 25, 2011
103	12	"New Beginnings"	February 25, 2011
104	13	"Make Room for the Groom"	March 4, 2011
105	14	"Search and Dress-cue"	March 11, 2011
106	15	"Men of Honor"	March 18, 2011
107	16	"Great Gown Expectations"	March 25, 2011
108	17	"Decisions, Decisions, Decisions..."	April 1, 2011
109	18	"Happily Ever After...Sort Of"	April 8, 2011

=== Season 7 (2011) ===
No. overall	No. in season	Title	Original release date
110	1	"Pushing the Limits"	October 7, 2011
111	2	"Fashion Police"	October 7, 2011
112	3	"Too Many Cooks in the Kitchen"	October 14, 2011
113	4	"One of a Kind"	October 14, 2011
114	5	"Worth the Wait"	October 21, 2011
115	6	"Together as One"	October 21, 2011
116	7	"Dress Obsess"	October 28, 2011
117	8	"The Devil is in the Details"	October 28, 2011
118	9	"The Facilitators"	November 4, 2011
119	10	"Never Settle"	November 4, 2011
120	11	"Sister Resistors"	November 11, 2011
121	12	"The Majority Rules"	November 18, 2011
122	13	"A One Track Mind"	November 25, 2011
123	14	"That Special Someone"	December 2, 2011
124	15	"Same Dress, Different Girl"	December 9, 2011
125	16	"For the Love of Mom"	December 16, 2011
126	17	"Ready, Aim, Focus!"	December 23, 2011
127	18	"Princess for a Day"	December 30, 2011

=== Season 8 (2012) ===
No. overall	No. in season	Title	Original release date
128	1	"You're Sexy and You Know It"	June 15, 2012
129	2	"Extreme Entourage"	June 15, 2012
130	3	"Not Your Mama's Dress"	June 22, 2012
131	4	"Sister, Sister"	June 22, 2012
132	5	"Race Against Time"	June 29, 2012
133	6	"2 Dresses 1 Dream"	June 29, 2012
134	7	"His Opinion..."	July 6, 2012
135	8	"What's My Style"	July 6, 2012
136	9	"Image Is Everything"	July 13, 2012
137	10	"Big Budget Brides"	July 13, 2012
138	11	"Rocker Brides"	July 20, 2012
139	12	"Worth the Weight"	July 20, 2012
140	13	"Expecting Brides"	July 27, 2012
141	14	"NFL Brides"	August 3, 2012
142	15	"Red She Said"	August 3, 2012
143	16	"Staying True Before Saying I Do"	August 10, 2012
144	17	"Bling It On!"	August 17, 2012
145	18	"New Beginnings"	August 17, 2012

=== Season 9 (2012–13) ===
No. overall	No. in season	Title	Original release date	U.S. viewers (millions)
146	1	"Big Entourage, Bigger Opinions"	December 28, 2012	1.64
147	2	"Daddy-Daughter Dilemma"	December 28, 2012	1.56
148	3	"Mother May I?"	January 4, 2013	1.33
149	4	"A Very Merry Wedding"	January 4, 2013	1.60
150	5	"Princess Fantasy"	January 11, 2013	1.16
151	6	"Beat the Clock"	January 11, 2013	1.30
152	7	"Second Time Around"	January 18, 2013	1.20
153	8	"Size Me Up"	January 18, 2013	1.41
154	9	"The Blowout Sale"	January 25, 2013	1.41
155	10	"Keeping an Open Mind"	January 25, 2013	1.60
156	11	"Grands Knows Best"	February 1, 2013	1.15
157	12	"Dare to Be Different"	February 1, 2013	1.34
158	13	"Queen for the Day"	February 8, 2013	1.34
159	14	"Love the Skin I'm in"	February 8, 2013	1.27
160	15	"It's Just Money"	February 15, 2013	1.10
161	16	"Day of Challenges"	February 15, 2013	1.22
162	17	"Picky Brides"	February 22, 2013	1.28
163	18	"Requests Like None of the Rest"	March 1, 2013	1.41

=== Season 10 (2013) ===
No. overall	No. in season	Title	Original release date	U.S. viewers (millions)
164	1	"Sisters Know Best"	August 16, 2013	1.43
165	2	"A Family Affair"	August 16, 2013	1.42
166	3	"Showing off Your Assets"	August 23, 2013	1.16
167	4	"Brides and Their Boys"	August 23, 2013	1.38
168	5	"Family Rules"	August 30, 2013	1.29
169	6	"Father of the Bride"	September 6, 2013	1.17
170	7	"Better Than the First"	September 6, 2013	1.26
171	8	"More Than a Wedding"	September 13, 2013	1.12
172	9	"Race to the Altar"	September 13, 2013	1.20
173	10	"You're Making Me Blush"	September 20, 2013	1.38
174	11	"Mom's Day, Mom's Way"	September 20, 2013	1.36
175	12	"Not What I Had in Mind"	September 27, 2013	1.06
176	13	"Day of Challenges"	October 4, 2013	N/A
177	14	"Not What I Was Expecting"	October 11, 2013	1.13
178	15	"I'll Know It When I See It"	October 25, 2013	1.18
179	16	"A Surprising Turn of Events"	October 25, 2013	1.09
180	17	"A Mother's Touch"	November 1, 2013	N/A
181	18	"Apple of His Eye"	November 1, 2013	N/A

=== Season 11 (2014) ===
No. overall	No. in season	Title	Original release date	U.S. viewers (millions)
182	1	"New Dress – New Beginning"	February 21, 2014	N/A
183	2	"A Gown Worth the Trip"	February 21, 2014	N/A
184	3	"Nothing Ordinary Here"	February 28, 2014	N/A
185	4	"More Money, More Problems"	February 28, 2014	N/A
186	5	"No Room for Compromise"	March 7, 2014	N/A
187	6	"It Fits, She Scores!"	March 7, 2014	N/A
188	7	"Til Dress Do Us Part"	March 14, 2014	N/A
189	8	"One of a Kind Dress Requests"	March 14, 2014	N/A
190	9	"If You're Got It, Flaunt It"	March 21, 2014	N/A
191	10	"My Day, Mom's Way"	March 28, 2014	N/A
192	11	"Design Intervention"	April 4, 2014	N/A
193	12	"A Kleinfeld Family Affair"	April 11, 2014	N/A
194	13	"For His Consideration"	April 18, 2014	N/A
195	14	"More, More, More!"	April 25, 2014	N/A
196	15	"Always the Pageant Girl..."	May 2, 2014	N/A
197	16	"Smother's Day"	May 9, 2014	N/A
198	17	"Sister Act!"	May 16, 2014	N/A
199	19	"A Chart Topping Dress"	May 23, 2014	N/A

=== Season 12 (2014) ===
No. overall	No. in season	Title	Original release date	U.S. viewers (millions)
200	1	"Surprise, Surprise!"	October 10, 2014	N/A
201	2	"When in Doubt, Customize"	October 17, 2014	N/A
202	3	"Tight, Strapless, and Sexy!"	October 17, 2014	N/A
203	4	"All Hands on Deck"	October 24, 2014	N/A
204	5	"Mom's Seal of Approval"	October 24, 2014	N/A
205	6	"Brotherly Love"	November 7, 2014	N/A
206	7	"Father Knows Dress"	November 7, 2014	N/A
207	8	"A Dress Like None the Rest"	November 14, 2014	N/A
208	9	"The Quest for Perfection"	November 14, 2014	N/A
209	10	"Top My Dream Dress!"	November 21, 2014	N/A
210	11	"Entourage Sabotage"	November 21, 2014	N/A
211	12	"Dueling Visions"	November 28, 2014	N/A
212	13	"Dazed and Gown-fused"	November 28, 2014	N/A
213	14	"Style Therapy"	December 5, 2014	N/A
214	15	"A Thorn in the Bride's Side"	December 5, 2014	N/A
215	16	"Challenge After Challenge"	December 19, 2014	N/A
216	17	"Sample Sale Madness!"	December 19, 2014	N/A

=== Season 13 (2015) ===
No. overall	No. in season	Title	Original release date	U.S. viewers (millions)
217	1	"A Comedian Walks into a Bridal Salon..."	March 6, 2015	N/A
218	2	"Performance Piece"	March 6, 2015	N/A
219	3	"A Situation in the Salon"	March 13, 2015	N/A
220	4	"Vision Confusion"	March 13, 2015	N/A
221	5	"Agree to Disagree"	March 20, 2015	N/A
222	6	"Breaking the Bank"	March 20, 2015	N/A
223	7	"Booby Trap"	March 27, 2015	N/A
224	8	"Please Love My Dress"	March 27, 2015	N/A
225	9	"Love at First Sight"	April 3, 2015	N/A
226	10	"Designer Dreams"	April 10, 2015	N/A
227	11	"Case of Dress Distress"	April 17, 2015	N/A
228	12	"Worth the Wait"	April 24, 2015	N/A
229	13	"Daddy Dearest"	May 1, 2015	N/A
230	14	"Like Mother, Unlike Daughter"	May 8, 2015	N/A
231	15	"Drama, Drama, Drama!"	May 15, 2015	N/A
232	16	"V.I.Pnina"	May 22, 2015	N/A
233	17	"Sexy Sells"	May 29, 2015	N/A
234	18	"The Sale is On!"	June 5, 2015	N/A

=== Season 14 (2016) ===
No. overall	No. in season	Title	Original release date	U.S. viewers (millions)
235	1	"What Does Martha Think?"	March 4, 2016	N/A
236	2	"I've Stalked This Dress on Instagram"	March 4, 2016	N/A
237	3	"The Sasha Dress!"	March 11, 2016	N/A
238	4	"I Am a Bride on a Budget"	March 11, 2016	N/A
239	5	"This Is Your Day"	March 18, 2016	N/A
240	6	"I Won the Battle Against My Twin!"	March 18, 2016	N/A
241	7	"I Am Bride-yoncé"	March 25, 2016	N/A
242	8	"You Are a Daredevil!"	April 1, 2016	N/A
243	9	"I'm Not the Size of a Hanger!"	April 8, 2016	N/A
244	10	"A Rainbow Unicorn Dress"	April 15, 2016	N/A
245	11	"Bling, Lace and Cleavage!"	April 22, 2016	N/A
246	12	"Dad's Being a Dadzilla"	April 29, 2016	N/A
247	13	"Come on in, Grandma!"	May 6, 2016	N/A
248	14	"The Male Perspective"	May 13, 2016	N/A
249	15	"I'm a Legacy"	May 20, 2016	N/A
250	16	"Not Afraid to Try New Things"	June 3, 2016	N/A
251	17	"That Looks Like a Torture Device"	June 10, 2016	N/A
252	18	"I'm a Firm Believer in Signs"	June 17, 2016	N/A
253	19	"There's a New Guy in Town"	June 24, 2016	N/A
254	20	"Randy, I Think I Got This"	June 24, 2016	N/A

=== Season 15 (2017) ===
No. overall	No. in season	Title	Original release date	U.S. viewers (millions)
255	1	"10 Years Later and Busier Than Ever!"	March 4, 2017	N/A
256	2	"The Shay Way"	March 11, 2017	N/A
257	3	"I Want My Daughter to Look Like a Sexpot"	March 18, 2017	N/A
258	4	"Love Is Love"	March 25, 2017	N/A
259	5	"We're Going to Say I Do Underwater!"	April 8, 2017	N/A
260	6	"Not Hell nor High Water"	April 15, 2017	N/A
261	7	"We Don't Do Anything Normal"	April 22, 2017	N/A
262	8	"My Sister Are Picking Out My Dress!"	April 29, 2017	N/A
263	9	"This Is My Fiance...and This Is His Wife!"	May 6, 2017	N/A
264	10	"Empire State of Bride"	May 13, 2017	N/A
265	11	"Overwhelmed"	June 10, 2017	N/A
266	12	"Second-Time"	June 17, 2017	N/A
267	13	"Fit for a Princess"	June 24, 2017	N/A
268	14	"Total Control"	July 1, 2017	N/A
269	15	"Style Wars"	July 8, 2017	N/A
270	16	"Outside the Box Dresses"	July 15, 2017	N/A

=== Season 16 (2018) ===
No. overall	No. in season	Title	Original release date	U.S. viewers (millions)
271	1	"Everything Is on the Line"	January 6, 2018	N/A
272	2	"Randy Showed You the Door!"	January 13, 2018	N/A
273	3	"A Gown to Match My Black Heart"	January 20, 2018	N/A
274	4	"I'm Having a Moment"	January 27, 2018	N/A
275	5	"Coco is Not Impressed"	February 3, 2018	N/A
276	6	"Launching a New Marriage"	February 24, 2018	N/A
277	7	"There's a Shark in the Salon!"	March 3, 2018	N/A
278	8	"Leave Some Space"	March 10, 2018	N/A
279	9	"Did Someone Say $16,000?"	March 17, 2018	N/A
280	10	"That's How You Dress a Lady"	March 24, 2018	N/A
281	11	"Randy's Favorite Celeb Moments"	March 31, 2018	N/A

=== Season 17 (2019) ===
No. overall	No. in season	Title	Original release date	U.S. viewers (millions)
282	1	"Hell Yes to the Dress"	January 5, 2019	N/A
283	2	"Randy's Memorable Appointments"	January 5, 2019	N/A
284	3	"A Purple Unicorn"	January 12, 2019	N/A
285	4	"Morticia Addams in a Good Way"	January 19, 2019	N/A
286	5	"7 People with 7 Opinions"	January 26, 2019	N/A
287	6	"Don't Show the Goodies"	February 2, 2019	N/A
288	7	"The WAG"	February 9, 2019	N/A
289	8	"Cheetah Bride"	February 16, 2019	N/A
290	9	"Not With Those Chubby Arms"	February 23, 2019	N/A
291	10	"Bionic Bride"	March 2, 2019	N/A
292	11	"A Walk Down the Aisle"	March 9, 2019	N/A

=== Season 18 (2019) ===
No. overall	No. in season	Title	Original release date	U.S. viewers (millions)
293	1	"This Is Showtime"	July 20, 2019	N/A
294	2	"I'm the Evil Mom Here"	July 27, 2019	N/A
295	3	"200% Trouble With This Dress"	August 3, 2019	N/A
296	4	"Mom's Not on the Guest List"	August 10, 2019	N/A
297	5	"Randy Will Show You the Door"	August 17, 2019	N/A
298	6	"Love at First Flight"	August 24, 2019	N/A
299	7	"Cinderella Gone Wrong"	August 24, 2019	N/A
300	8	"Fashionably Late"	August 31, 2019	N/A
301	9	"Bedazzled Truck Driver"	September 7, 2019	N/A
302	10	"Crazy Uncle Randy"	September 14, 2019	N/A

=== Season 19 (2020) ===
No. overall	No. in season	Title	Original release date	U.S. viewers (millions)
303	1	"A Birthday Surprise"	July 11, 2020	N/A
304	2	"I Wanna Be Naked"	July 18, 2020	N/A
305	3	"Big Brother Hits Kleinfeld"	July 25, 2020	N/A
306	4	"You Look Like a Chicken!"	August 1, 2020	N/A
307	5	"She Popped the Thigh at Me"	August 8, 2020	N/A
308	6	"Watteau Is the Word of the Day"	August 15, 2020	N/A
309	7	"Hollywood Meets Bollywood"	August 22, 2020	N/A
310	8	"Whose Side Are You On?"	August 22, 2020	N/A
311	9	"This Is a Randy Situation"	September 5, 2020	N/A
312	10	"Is It Crown-Worthy?"	September 12, 2020	N/A

=== Season 20 (2021) ===
No. overall	No. in season	Title	Original release date	U.S. viewers (millions)
313	1	"We Don't Always Have a Say Yes"	July 4, 2021	N/A
314	2	"I'm Going by the Feel"	July 17, 2021	N/A
315	3	"This is my Husband, and This is my Fiancee"	July 24, 2021	N/A
316	4	"The Struggle Is Real"	August 31, 2021	N/A
317	5	"I'm Not Crying, You're Crying"	August 7, 2021	N/A
318	6	"Our Dress Has to Go Viral"	August 14, 2021	N/A
319	7	"Ugly Duckling"	August 21, 2021	N/A
320	8	"Thank You, Next"	September 3, 2021	N/A
321	9	"Mom, You've Said Just Enough"	September 11, 2021	N/A
322	10	"Kleinfeld, Here I Come!"	September 18, 2021	N/A
323	11	"A Season of Surprises"	September 25, 2021	N/A

=== Season 21 (2022) ===
No. overall	No. in season	Title	Original release date	U.S. viewers (millions)
324	1	"You Went From Snickers Bar to Caviar"	July 9, 2022	N/A
325	2	"Is Anyone Even Listening to Me?"	July 16, 2022	N/A
326	3	"Diva with a capital D"	July 23, 2022	N/A
327	4	"Can't We All Get Along and Get This Dress?"	July 30, 2022	N/A
328	5	"I Got Engaged Last Night!"	August 6, 2022	N/A
329	6	"Twenty Freakin' Seasons!"	August 13, 2022	N/A

=== Season 22 (2023) ===
No. overall	No. in season	Title	Original release date	U.S. viewers (millions)
330	1	"I'm Gonna Be the Problem Child Here"	March 4, 2023	N/A
331	2	"The Three B's: Back, Biceps and Booty"	March 11, 2023	N/A
332	3	"Let's Give the Man What He Wants"	March 18, 2023	N/A
333	4	"The "Just in Case" Dress"	March 25, 2023	N/A
334	5	"Now I Just Need to Find a Husband"	March 31, 2023	N/A
335	6	"Not a Good Day, an Incredible Day"	April 8, 2023	N/A

=== Season 23 (2025) ===
No. overall	No. in season	Title	Original release date	U.S. viewers (millions)
336	1	"Nobody Suspects a Thing"	April 5, 2025	N/A
337	2	"Tens Across the Board"	April 12, 2025	N/A
338	3	"She Said Maybe to the Dress"	April 19, 2025	N/A
339	4	"It's Gotta Be...Substantial"	April 26, 2025	N/A
340	5	"I Didn't Mean to Make Randy Cry"	May 3, 2025	N/A
341	6	"I'm Marrying Me"	May 10, 2025	N/A
342	7	"That's Bold"	May 17, 2025	N/A
