= In a Fix =

American television series

- Title card
- Country of origin: United States
- No. of seasons: 2
- No. of episodes: 88

Production
- Executive producers: Charlie DeBevoise, Mark Hickman
- Editors: Richard Campbell, Ed Kaz
- Running time: 44 minutes

Original release
- Network: TLC
- Release: January 17, 2004 – June 18, 2005

In a Fix is an American television series involving a team of construction workers and a designer who "rescue" homeowners from stalled "do it yourself" renovation projects. Original episodes of In a Fix, which was produced by NorthSouth Productions, aired on TLC in 2004 and 2005. The program has been shown in reruns on the Discovery Home Channel in the United States, TLC in Canada and Discovery Real Time in Asia.

== Premise ==
Each episode of In a Fix follows a similar formula. The host, designer, and construction team “surprises” the homeowners, most often a pair of spouses or two close family members. The team then inspects the stalled project, usually consisting of one or two rooms. Occasionally the project involves an outdoor project. The host then identifies who is responsible for the project and makes that person wear a bright red T-shirt reading “It’s All My Fault” and send the other homeowner to a hotel or spa.

The “In a Fix Team”, along with the homeowner at fault, then spends three days working to complete the project. Upon completion, the other homeowner returns to be surprised by the end result.

The host of In a Fix is Marc Goldberg. Each episode has one of four designers, Evette Rios, Nani Vinken, Franzella Guido and Deborah DiMare. An episode usually involves three to four crew members who do the construction, although some episodes involve more crew members at a time depending on the size of the project. The crew members are Justin Brown, Marc Bartolomeo (aka “Sparky”), Jennie Lyn Berntson, Gregory Carey, James Lunday, Danny Paul, and Don Wood.

The theme music for the program was composed by former Hüsker Dü member Bob Mould.
