= 100 Days of Summer =

American reality television series

- Genre: Reality television
- Starring: Jay Michael; Pascale Wellin; Phillips Demming; Ray Austin; Tara Clack; Vincent Anzalone
- Country of origin: United States
- Original language: English
- No. of seasons: 1
- No. of episodes: 8

Production
- Executive producers: Abby Greensfelder; Nicole Sorrenti; Sean Gallagher
- Running time: 42 minutes
- Production company: Half Yard Productions

Original release
- Network: Bravo
- Release: January 7 – February 25, 2014

100 Days of Summer is an American reality television series that premiered January 7, 2014, on Bravo. It chronicles the personal, professional, and social lives of six friends who reside in Chicago.

== Cast ==
- Jay Michael – partner in a real estate development business.
- Pascale Wellin – co-founder of a jewelry line. Wellin was named to Chicago Magazine's list of most beautiful Chicagoans in 2011.
- Phillips Demming – founder of a clothing line that has clothes for dogs and humans.
- Ray Austin – former Chicago Bears player who is now a businessman, model, and actor.
- Tara Clack – a veterinarian.
- Vincent Anzalone – co-owner of an event marketing company and a property finance firm. Anzalone was named to Chicago Magazine's 2011 list of most eligible singles.

== Episodes ==
No.	Title	Original release date	U.S. viewers (millions)
1	"Ship-Faced"	January 7, 2014	0.72
In the series premiere of 100 Days of Summer, the group comes together for a yachting trip on the lake to enjoy the start of summer. Vince is showing too much public affection to his girlfriend, which annoys the rest of the group. Pascale says some things that make Ray's girlfriend, Hamidah, annoyed. Jay takes a risk by hiring Phillips for an upcoming event.
2	"Devil in the Blue Dress"	January 14, 2014	0.59
Vince and Lonnie host a "White Party", where Pascale stirs up some drama. Tara invites everyone to her charity event. Pascale and Hamidah try to reconcile. Jay and Phillips business agreement isn't working out.
3	"The Deep Dish"	January 21, 2014	0.85
Tara begins to pressure her boyfriend. Vince has had enough of Jay's antics and confronts him. Ray and his girlfriend work to fix their relationship.
4	"Cruel Summer"	January 28, 2014	0.54
5	"Out of the Loop"	February 4, 2014	0.60
6	"Kosher Kimchi Baby"	February 11, 2014	0.57
7	"The Summer's Over..."	February 18, 2014	0.54
8	"Secrets Revealed"	February 25, 2014	0.67
