= Prank Academy =

- Genre: Comedy, Reality
- Starring: Jesse Wellens & Jeana Smith
- Country of origin: United States
- Original language: English
- No. of seasons: 1
- No. of episodes: 18

Production
- Camera setup: Single-camera
- Running time: 9-14 minutes
- Production company: NorthSouth Productions

Original release
- Network: YouTube Red
- Release: March 30 – July 20, 2016

Prank Academy is an American series produced exclusively for YouTube Red, which starred Jesse Wellens & Jeana Smith. The series premiered on March 30, 2016. The season finale was released on July 20, 2016. The 18 episodes series is produced by NorthSouth Productions.

The hidden camera series followed Jesse Wellens & Jeana Smith as they teach Internet celebrities to pull off pranks on other people.

== Episodes ==
=== Season 1 ===
No.	Title	Episode length	Original Release Date	Passed or Failed?
1	“Girl Caught On Fire Prank”	14:41	March 30, 2016	PASSED
2	“Stolen Song Lyrics Prank”	12:46	March 30, 2016	PASSED
3	“Terrifying Crane Prank On Jesse”	11:37	April 6, 2016	PASSED
4	“Destroyed Birthday Cake Prank”	13:26	April 13, 2016	PASSED
5	“Miranda Sings Speed Dating Prank”	12:21	April 20, 2016	PASSED
6	“Old Man Breakdance Prank”	11:27	April 27, 2016	PASSED
7	“Crazy Restaurant Fight Prank”	10:13	May 4, 2016	PASSED
8	“Haunted Room Prank”	11:39	May 11, 2016	PASSED
9	“Real Tiger Prank”	12:49	May 18, 2016	N/A
10	“Epic Car Crash Prank”	11:56	May 25, 2016	PASSED
11	“Robbery Prank”	10:35	June 1, 2016	FAILED
12	“Multiplying Puppy Prank”	9:49	June 8, 2016	PASSED
13	“Chokehold Prank”	13:03	June 15, 2016	PASSED
14	“Human Statue Prank”	10:44	June 22, 2016	PASSED
15	“Creepy Stalker Prank”	11:54	June 29, 2016	FAILED
16	“New York City Rat Prank”	9:32	July 6, 2016	N/A
17	“Juggling Prank Gone Wrong”	12:59	July 13, 2016	PASSED
18	“Monster Truck Prank”	13:57	July 20, 2016	PASSED
