= Diggers (TV series) =

American reality television series

- Genre: Reality television
- Starring: George Wyant; Tim Saylor
- Country of origin: United States
- Original language: English
- No. of seasons: 4
- No. of episodes: 66

Production
- Running time: 23 minutes
- Production company: Half Yard Productions

Original release
- Network: National Geographic
- Release: January 1, 2013 – October 19, 2015

Diggers is an American reality television series, shown on National Geographic. Filmed in various locations across the United States, the series follows hobbyist metal detectorists “King George” Wyant and his friend Tim “The Ringmaster” Saylor as they travel the United States, looking for historical artifacts. Landowners, historians and archaeologists invite them, and grant permission to search various areas looking for overlooked historical items.

== Episodes ==
Diggers had a run of 4 seasons, with 66 episodes from 2013—2015.

In season 3, episode 1 which aired on February 25, 2014, Wyant and Saylor located the Steve Jobs Time Capsule.

In season 4, episode 8 which aired on August 10, 2015, Wyant and Saylor returned to the McCoy valley they had searched in 2012 and helped professional archaeologists locate the McCoy cabin burned down by the Hatfields in the Hatfield–McCoy feud.

== Cast ==
- “King George” Wyant - A born and bred Montana boy. The outdoors is Wyant's playground; hunting, fishing, skiing and metal detecting.
- Tim “The Ringmaster” Saylor - An Iowa native who started metal detecting in high school. He was hooked on the hobby when he began recovering silver coins in his own backyard. Saylor's luck really runs high when it comes to finding rings, though, so that's how he landed the nickname "Ringy."

== Criticism ==
In 2012, it was reported that the Society for American Archaeology was mounting a campaign against Diggers. They said these shows encouraged looting of American archaeological sites. The show would frequently display the monetary value of found artifacts, drawing ire among a variety of archaeological groups. In response, the series would stop the practice. Frank Limp, president of the Society of American Archaeology (SAA) at the time, published a letter criticizing the TV series for disregard of professional ethics and historical preservation. The show was also scrutinized for its lack of professional archaeological practices such as publication of findings or artifact mapping. The largely non-scientific approach of the show falls in line with the media proliferation of pseudoarcheology.

For the 2015 season, the production company, Half Yard Productions, added archaeologist Marc Henshaw to the program and invited the Society for American Archaeology (SAA) and the Society for Historical Archaeology (SHA) to review each episode. The feedback from the SAA and changes made to the program in response were reported in detail in a paper presented at the 2016 Annual Meeting of the SAA. Limited data suggested that the changes did not adversely affect the show's appeal, but the period of evaluation was short, as Diggers was canceled in 2015 when Fox News Network acquired NG Channel.

The duo subsequently struck out on their own in 2017 with the web series Diggin with KG and Ringy in which they explore sites around the world.

== See also ==
- National Geographic Channel
