= One Way Out (TV series) =

- Genre: Reality television
- Starring: Jonathan Goodwin
- Original language: English
- No. of seasons: 1
- No. of episodes: 10

Production
- Production company: NorthSouth Productions

Original release
- Network: Discovery
- Release: January 26 – July 8, 2009

One Way Out is an American reality television series that was produced by NorthSouth Productions for the Discovery Channel. The program stars escape artist Jonathan Goodwin, who performs difficult escape stunts. A pilot episode aired on April 14, 2008, and the series began a ten-part first season on January 26, 2009.

== Premise ==
In the show, Jonathan goes to extremes to test the art and physics of escape. He is joined by chief collaborator Mikey Nelson and master builder/engineer Terry Stroud. Episode topics include:

- To test what the body can do with minimal movement, Jonathan locks himself inside a box on top of a shaking washing machine with his body covered in 200,000 bees.
- How does the force of spinning affect the body and the mind? Jonathan attempts to escape from a locked barrel pushed down a large hill and rolling at 126 revolutions per minute, spins on a chair at incredible speeds and then navigates barefoot through piles of broken glass, and withstands two Gs of force on his body courtesy of the Water Wheel of Doom.
- While exploring the science and the pain associated with projectiles, Jonathan chains himself in a standing position as six tennis ball cannons pummel his body with balls flying at 45 mph; jumps into just 17 inches of water, mud and hay from a height of almost 20 feet; and becomes a human projectile himself by getting placed in a giant slingshot and launched over 65 feet in the air.

== Episodes ==
Episode	Title	Description	Airdate
1	Bee Stung Brit	Jonathan has agitated bees added onto him as he tries to escape locked in a box atop a washing machine.	26/Jan/2009
2	Ice Trap	Jonathan challenges freezing temperatures as he immerses himself in ice cold water. Also, he visits an ice house in preparation for an ice-tank escape.	26/Jan/2009
3	Long Way Down	Jonathan Goodwin challenges gravity when he takes a leap off a high dive board, helps out in a life-sized domino rally, and executes an escape 30 feet above ground.	02/Feb/2009
4	Dizzy Limit	Jonathan Goodwin finds himself in spinning predicaments when he rolls down a hill inside of a barrel, ascends from a whirling chair and takes a ride inside a water wheel.	02/Feb/2009
5	Human Catapult	The host runs through a barrage of speeding tennis balls and then a dive into a kiddie pool. His final stunt is being fired from a human catapult.	09/Feb/2009
6	Buried Alive	Jonathan buries himself inside a coffin.	16/Feb/2009
7	BMX Bounce	Jonathan is whacked by hanging objects, rides aboard a speeding BMX bike into an impact-measuring device, and makes an attempt to escape while Mikey slams into him going full speed on a BMX.	08/Jul/2009
8	Car On My Head	Jonathan has himself sealed inside of a vacuum bag with all the air sucked out; then allows huge amounts of weight to be added onto his stomach and attempts to survive having the weight of a car placed on his head.	08/Jul/2009
9	Trail By Fire	Jonathan has his hands and feet set on fire, licks a red-hot fireplace poker and must escape being burned at the stake while being chained and handcuffed.	08/Jul/2009
10	Bird Brained	Jonathan gets placed in a pen as dinner for some hungry turkeys, learns about ostriches aggressive behavior, and comes face-to-face in a pen of dangerous giant birds.	08/Jul/2009
