= Sidewalks: Video Nite =

- Created by: Richard R. Lee
- Starring: Richard R. Lee
- Country of origin: United States

Production
- Producer: Richard R. Lee
- Running time: 30 minutes per episode

Original release
- Network: syndicated
- Release: 1992 – present

Sidewalks: Video Nite (1992–present) is an American television show featuring music videos. The show is a spin-off from Sidewalks Entertainment.

Sidewalks: Video Nite's music format is primarily POP and R&B. The show also airs country, jazz, and hip hop clips.

== Overview ==
After fifteen episodes were produced under Sidewalks Entertainment banner, creator and executive producer Richard R. Lee decided to create a spin-off show to handle the number of tapes that were coming from various record labels.

Early in the show's run, the program used Sidewalks personalities, such as Denise Yvonne (now known as Dee Jones), Erin Willis and Mel Menefee. To produce episodes quicker and present more video clips, the host segments were dropped and replaced by generic tags.

Currently, Sidewalks: Video Nite is a regular series on KCRT-TV in Richmond, California and some selected episodes are aired in other parts of the San Francisco Bay Area.

The exact airdates of the premiere edition and episodes until April 2004 are unknown. As of March 16, 2006, 423 episodes were produced.
