= Sidewalks Entertainment =

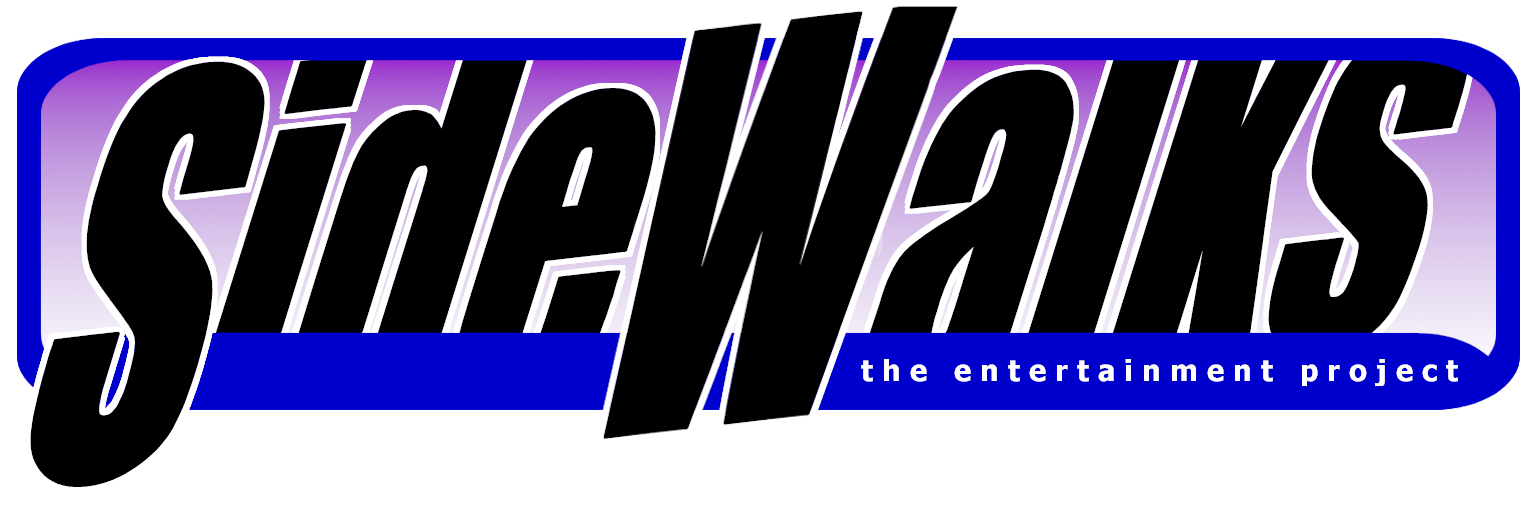
- The 2006 logo for the Sidewalks Entertainment TV series
- Created by: Richard R. Lee
- Starring: Cindy Rhodes; Rafael Siegel; Richard R. Lee
- Country of origin: United States

Production
- Executive producer: Richard R. Lee
- Running time: 30 minutes per episode

Original release
- Network: syndicated
- Release: September 1, 1988 – present

Sidewalks Entertainment (1988–present) is a weekly American television series that is a combination of a talk show, magazine show and variety show featuring celebrity interviews, music, artistic and novelty acts, and rising performers. The 30-minute program is primarily produced in the San Francisco Bay Area with segments from other parts of the country, including Los Angeles and New York.

Richard R. Lee is the creator and executive producer, as well as lead editor and webmaster of SidewalksTV.com. On-air personalities Cindy Rhodes and Rafael Siegel are also co-producers.

During the first six years, the show was known as Sidewalks. The producers decided to add Entertainment to the program's title, so viewers would understand it was an entertainment show and not a show related to public works or about concrete walkways. On websites and television grids, the program is listed as Sidewalks Entertainment, although hosts, guests and on-air graphics may still refer to the program as Sidewalks.

As of April 14, 2007, the show has produced 256 regular editions, along with a number of special episodes and temporary shows.

== History ==
=== Guests and segments ===
The current version of Sidewalks is primarily a celebrity-based interview and music show, but the original concept was somewhat different.

The initial draft was to feature street performers, who are also known as sidewalk performers (hence the show's title). Cameras would follow and showcase the street performers in San Francisco or at the studio where Sidewalks was produced. Shortly before production began, the street performer segment was dropped due to time and a lack of interest from some of the money-starved talents. Only a handful of street performers eventually appeared on the series.

The early years of Sidewalks became a TV showcase for unknown aspiring musicians and artists. Talents appeared with at least one full-length performance, followed by a short interview. For some of the talents, the show produced exclusive music videos of the acts. The Sidewalks clips became one of the trademarks of the production for guests and viewers (after airing on an episode, the videos went on to become demonstration reels for the guests and also appeared on some international television programs).

In 1990, the show expanded its format and experimented with national music videos. Along with musical clips from popular artists such as Mariah Carey, Jessica Simpson, and Destiny's Child, well-known musical stars, ranging from Fred Schneider of The B-52's to then-newcomer Mary J. Blige, became guests. Around 1992, the show journeyed into more celebrity interviews, which now included actors from TV and films. The regional show became part of the national media tour, where celebrities would come on a TV show to pitch or promote their projects. The Sidewalks host would conduct interviews either in-person or from a satellite tour.

Some of the national guests who have appeared on the show:

- Actresses: Brittany Murphy, Doris Roberts, Melinda Clarke, Jennie Garth, Jamie-Lynn DiScala, Sela Ward, Vanessa Marcil, Debbie Reynolds, AnnaSophia Robb, Catherine Bell, Teri Garr, Rae Dawn Chong, and Nell Carter.
- Actors: Michael Madsen, Bill Paxton, Hank Azaria, Scott Bakula, Danny Glover, Bob Saget, Robert Englund, and Rob Schneider.
- Singers/bands: Green Day, Josh Groban, The Judds, Phil Collins, Bruce Hornsby, Kenny Loggins, David Ford, Teddy Geiger, LaToya London, Rick Springfield, John Hiatt, country performers Sara Evans and Deana Carter, rock band Barenaked Ladies, and Christian music stars Sandi Patty, Rachael Lampa, and Point of Grace.
- Sports stars: Wayne Gretzky, Jeff Gordon, Mia Hamm, Brandi Chastain, Bonnie Blair, Richard Petty, Jon Wood, Bobby Labonte, Michael Waltrip, and Shaquille O'Neal.
- TV hosts: Meredith Vieira, Elisabeth Hasselbeck and Joy Behar (from ABC's The View), Stephanie Miller, Melissa Rivers, and Donny and Marie Osmond.
- Authors: Judith Krantz, Sidney Sheldon, and Jackie Collins.

Sidewalks also took its production remotely to showcase a variety of events and conventions. Events such as KMEL radio's Summer Jam event, the nationwide Lollapalooza concert tour, Walt Disney's Aladdin ice show, The National Association of Recording Merchandisers (NARM), The Renaissance Pleasure Faire, the comic and fantasy convention WonderCon, behind-the-scenes at Ringling Bros. and Barnum & Bailey Circus and movie premieres were featured. The Bay Area Music Awards (Bammies) (later renamed as the California Music Awards) became one of the show's major annual events.

In 2003, the show's production went bi-coastal, thanks to returning on-air personality of Siegel, who conducted celebrity interviews on the East Coast. He had a number of prominent interviews with such stars as Wyclef Jean, Heather Headley, and Gang Starr.

=== Hosts and correspondents ===
The show's 17th season is currently hosted by Cindy Rhodes, Rafael Siegel and Richard R. Lee, with correspondents Natalie Manuel and Eve Galazin.

Host/producer Rhodes has been the longest mainstay to the program since 1993. She has interviewed a majority of the celebrity interviews and is producing the satellite media tours segments. Host/producer Siegel, who originally started with the stage name Rafael Hernandez, joined the show in 1994 as viewer-turned production crew member-turned host. Siegel returned to the show in 2003 as an East Coast correspondent. In 2005, he moved back to the West Coast where Sidewalks is taped and joined the current hosting team.

The first set of nine shows during season one was hosted by Robert Guarino, Rosie Sorenson and Mel Menefee. The older Menefee became the show's on-screen gimmick between 1988 through 1994. The Mel Menefee character was an ongoing feature as the producers used Menefee's zaniness to form comedic situations, while the other personalities were hosting the episodes. When the show returned after a year hiatus, Menefee was joined by other personalities, most notably Denise Yvonne (now using the name Dee Jones). Other personalities that appeared for a number of seasons were Marci Camacho, Sibyl Motley, Jennifer Parnoff, and Veronica Ornelas.

Sidewalks also gives college students their first on-air experience. Eboni Warnking, Shereelynn Manlangit, Monica Calzada, Oakland Raiderettes cheerleader Michelle Marquez, and Nadine Toren have been some of the interns.

=== Production history ===
In early 1988, San Francisco Bay Area resident Richard R. Lee got a chance to create and produce his first television show at Televents, a local El Cerrito, California cable station, after he helped and worked on various studio productions. That TV show became Sidewalks, which went before the cameras in May and debuted its first episode on September 1, 1988.

The production schedule of Sidewalks has been irregular (due to TV station and equipment availability), although the show has never left the air since 1988. Sidewalks produced nine shows during season one. Almost a year later, the production returned for several more years at the retitled cable company Bay Cablevision (later purchased by various cable companies including AT&T and Comcast).

In 1994, Lee brought the production to KCRT-TV, a non-commercial Richmond, California TV station, where Lee was already working at for a couple of years. Throughout the decade run, the TV show was an intermittent co-production between Lee and the station until 2004.

The show is now solely produced by Sidewalks Entertainment, Inc., a California corporation developed by Rhodes and Lee, to further the production.

=== Sidewalks: The Entertainment Project ===
The main producers / hosts and a new team are currently working on re-launching the original concept into a potential national broadcast TV series. They are calling the forthcoming version, Sidewalks: The Entertainment Project (a title that may change when the new show premieres).

In 2005, the team produced a new one-hour test pilot, which sports among things a new logo and theme music. In the pilot, the segments were interviews with American Idols LaToya London, Queer Eye for the Straight Guys Carson Kressley, young actress AnnaSophia Robb, the pop music group From the Desk of Sally, a Kelly Clarkson video, and a feature about finding a talent agent. The pilot is designed to showcase the new production to commercial stations and TV networks.

While the team is developing the new version, the producers and hosts are continuing their long-running Sidewalks Entertainment and Sidewalks: Video Nite series with brand new episodes. Parts of the test pilot were recycled into two episodes ("American Idols" and "Talent Agents") of Sidewalks Entertainment's 16th season.

== Spin-off series: Sidewalks: Video Nite ==
Sidewalks receives music video clips from various record companies. In 1992, the show opened its fifth season with a set of music video editions. The initial reaction to the video shows didn't fared well with viewers, because the regular lineup of interviews, musical guests and artistic acts disappeared for a short time. Producer Lee decided to create a spin-off series to handle the load of clips. Sidewalks: Video Nite was born. Currently, Sidewalks: Video Nite is a regular series on KCRT-TV and some selected episodes are aired in other markets.

== The Website ==
Along with Sidewalks Entertainment and Sidewalks: Video Nite, the program's official website, SidewalksTV.com, has become its own entity. Creator and executive producer Lee has been the webmaster for the entire variation of the site.

Originally appearing as a small, couple page website on GeoCities and Xoom, the site featured basic information about the TV show and its staff. As time passed, the site moved onto other servers, presented on-line articles and displayed video clips. From the beginning until fall 2006, the site used exclusively Real video clips as its choice of web streaming. The latest clips are now encoded in Flash video for better platform delivery.

The main spotlight of the website is celebrity interviews. Since 2003, majority of the show's interviews have been presented on the site. Generally, the website displays the complete interview with a celebrity, whereas the TV show may exhibit an edited or shorter version of the same interview due to dated content or time allotment. Many of the interviews have debuted on the website days or weeks before it appeared on an episode of Sidewalks.

The website has also been presenting its own interviews and special segments taped by the Sidewalks production crew or, occasionally, an outside supplier. The crew has been recording multiple segments of an interview that can be used as separate web content. Some of the exclusive web presentations include interviews with rapper David Banner and R&B singer Raz-B; movie coverage of films Catch a Fire and The Pursuit of Happiness; behind-the-scenes interviews at The California Music Awards and sci-fi/comic convention WonderCon; and special features such as the audio mixing of movies, special health segments, and KBLX radio station's Kevin Brown Anniversary Party.

In the summer of 2006, Lee and production member Justin Langston launched the program's blog, Sidewalks on the Corner. The blog features articles and music and movie reviews.

Since May 2006, SidewalksTV.com has also been releasing selected clips on other digital platforms, such as YouTube and MySpace.
