= NorthSouth Productions =

American television production company

NorthSouth Productions LLC
- Type: Subsidiary
- Industry: Television production Film production Media; Marketing; Communications
- Founded: 2000; 26 years ago
- Founder: Charlie DeBevoise; Mark Hickman
- Headquarters: New York City; Los Angeles; Knoxville
- Area served: Worldwide
- Parent: Hearst Communications (50%)
- Divisions: NoSo Films
- Website: www.northsouth.tv

NorthSouth Productions LLC is a television production company in the United States that was founded by Charlie DeBevoise and Mark Hickman in 2000. NorthSouth creates and produces original programming for a variety of broadcast and cable networks including Peacock, HGTV, Discovery, TLC, History, A&E, MTV, VH1, SyFy, OWN: Oprah Winfrey Network, TruTV, WE tv, Discovery Health, Food Network, Lifetime, and the Sundance Channel. Their production credits include documentaries, reality television, travel series, and sports entertainment. The company has offices in New York City and Knoxville, Tennessee.

On December 6, 2012, it was announced that Hearst Corporation would take a 50% stake in NorthSouth. In 2016, Charlie DeBevoise bought out Mark Hickman of his stake in the company. DeBevoise now owns 50% of the company. In 2019, he formed NoSo Films to develop, produce, and finance long form documentaries.

Digital Graffiti is NorthSouth's full-service post-production facility.

== List of programs produced ==
- Prank Academy - YouTube Red
- Impractical Jokers - truTV
- Say Yes to the Dress: Atlanta – TLC
- Say Yes to the Dress: Bridesmaids – TLC
- Double Divas - Lifetime (TV network)
- Bullet Points - Military Channel
- Lovetown, USA - Oprah Winfrey Network (U.S. TV channel)
- Hard Parts: South Bronx - Speed (TV network)
- You Don't Know Dixie – History
- Marked – History
- Wrecked: Life in the Crash Lane – Speed
- One Way Out – Discovery Channel
- Little Miss Perfect – WE tv
- Paranormal Cops – A&E
- Ugliest House on the Block – WE tv
- Getting Abroad – MOJO HD
- Big Spender – A&E
- Try My Life – Style Network
- What Makes it Tick? – Fine Living
- Fight Quest – Discovery Channel
- I Bet You – MOJO HD
- Bride vs. Bride – WE tv
- In a Fix – TLC
- Million Dollar Agents (2005) – TLC
- A Wedding Story – TLC
- Get Packing – Travel Channel
- Make Room for Baby – Discovery Health
