= Say Yes to the Dress: Bridesmaids =

- Genre: Reality
- Country of origin: United States
- Original language: English
- No. of seasons: 4
- No. of episodes: 52

Production
- Running time: 20 to 22 minutes
- Production company: North South Productions

Original release
- Network: TLC
- Release: July 8, 2011 – August 2, 2013

Related
- Say Yes to the Dress; Say Yes to the Dress: Atlanta

Say Yes to the Dress: Bridesmaids is an American reality television series on TLC which follows events at Bridals by Lori in the Atlanta suburb of Sandy Springs, a bridal shop owned by Lori Allen. The series shows the progress of individual sales associates, managers, and fitters at the store, focusing on bridesmaid dresses and the bridesmaid showroom at Bridals by Lori. It is a spin-off of Say Yes to the Dress. Soon after the end of its first season, TLC renewed the show for a second season.

== Development ==
The idea for the spin-off occurred while in the set of Say Yes to the Dress: Atlanta. While the producers were in the bridal boutique where the show takes place they overheard a commotion between women in another part of the store over which bridesmaid dresses to select. This gave the producers the inspiration for a separate show based in the same boutique, focusing on bridesmaid dresses and the conflicts between the bride, her bridesmaids, and her family over what designs to purchase. Allen discussed with Good Morning America that the conflict often occurs because of a lack of communication between the bridesmaids and the bride over budget, body-type issues, and the bride's vision for their visual role in the wedding, which Allen states should have been discussed before entering the store, not afterwards.

== Episodes ==
Season	Episodes	Originally released	
Season	Episodes	First released	Last released
1	6	July 8, 2011	July 22, 2011
2	18	April 13, 2012	June 8, 2012
3	18	October 26, 2012	December 21, 2012
4	10	June 28, 2013	August 2, 2013

=== Season 1 (2011) ===
No. overall	No. in season	Title	Original release date
1	1	"Peacocks, Pink, and Purple"	July 8, 2011
2	2	"Fur Muffs and Fickle Friends"	July 8, 2011
3	3	"The Sister Standoff"	July 15, 2011
4	4	"Brides Against Bridesmaids"	July 15, 2011
5	5	"A Tale of Two Bridesmaids Dresses"	July 22, 2011
6	6	"The Groomzilla"	July 22, 2011

=== Season 2 (2012) ===
No. overall	No. in season	Title	Original release date
7	1	"Maid of Honorzilla"	April 13, 2012
8	2	"Not So Identical Twins"	April 13, 2012
9	3	"Mini Maid of Honor"	April 20, 2012
10	4	"Budget Bullies and Busty Bridesmaids"	April 20, 2012
11	5	"It's a Drag Being a Bridesmaid"	April 27, 2012
12	6	"Maids Against Modesty"	April 27, 2012
13	7	"Showdown At the Bridesmaids Corral"	May 4, 2012
14	8	"Designer Dreams and Indecisive Brides"	May 4, 2012
15	9	"Insults and Insecurities"	May 11, 2012
16	10	"Nautical Navy and Military Maids"	May 11, 2012
17	11	"Many Maids & Many Dresses"	May 18, 2012
18	12	"Mother Knows Bridesmaids"	May 18, 2012
19	13	"Sweet Brides and Sour Sisters"	May 25, 2012
20	14	"Jump for Joy With Your Country Cousins"	May 25, 2012
21	15	"Bridesmaids Are No Angels"	June 1, 2012
22	16	"Sorority Sisters & Sassy Sisters"	June 1, 2012
23	17	"Father Doesn't Know Bridesmaids Best"	June 8, 2012
24	18	"Say Yes to the Short Dress"	June 8, 2012

=== Season 3 (2012) ===
No. overall	No. in season	Title	Original release date
25	1	"Trouble With the Twins"	October 26, 2012
26	2	"22 Brawling Bridesmaids"	October 26, 2012
27	3	"Pink, Pink, Pink!"	November 2, 2012
28	4	"Miss America's Maids"	November 2, 2012
29	5	"Maids Gotta Go-Go"	November 9, 2012
30	6	"Black Sheep"	November 9, 2012
31	7	"Political Parties"	November 16, 2012
32	8	"Orange Appeal"	November 16, 2012
33	9	"Tiaras and Tribulations"	November 23, 2012
34	10	"Thou Shalt Not Wear Strapless"	November 23, 2012
35	11	"No Passion for Fashion"	November 30, 2012
36	12	"Mama-In-Law Knows Best"	November 30, 2012
37	13	"Potty Party"	December 7, 2012
38	14	"In-Law and Order"	December 7, 2012
39	15	"Sisters and Frothers"	December 14, 2012
40	16	"Size Matters"	December 14, 2012
41	17	"Show Up and Shut Up"	December 21, 2012
42	18	"Daycare by Lori"	December 21, 2012

=== Season 4 (2013) ===
No. overall	No. in season	Title	Original release date	U.S. viewers (millions)
43	1	"Girl Power"	June 28, 2013	1.11
44	2	"Cold Feet and Hot Tempers"	June 28, 2013	1.01
45	3	"PhD in Persuasion"	July 5, 2013	0.88
46	4	"Jarring Politics"	July 5, 2013	1.06
47	5	"Pray for Peace"	July 12, 2013	1.11
48	6	"Falling Apart at the Seams"	July 12, 2013	1.15
49	7	"Mudslingin' Mamas"	July 19, 2013	1.11
50	8	"Catfight on the Catwalk"	July 19, 2013	1.12
51	9	"Singled Out"	July 26, 2013	1.19
52	10	"Breaking the Rules"	August 2, 2013	1.21

== Bibliography ==
- "Say Yes to the Dress: Bridesmaids on TLC". TV Guide. Archived from the original on March 6, 2016.
- "Shows A-Z – say yes to the dress: bridesmaids on tlc". The Futon Critic.
- "Bridesmaid Dresses UK". MSN TV.
- "Say Yes to the Dress: Bridesmaids - Episode Guide". Zap2it. Archived from the original on May 23, 2013.
