= Say Yes to the Dress: Atlanta =

- Genre: Reality
- Starring: Monte Durham; Lori Allen
- Country of origin: United States
- Original language: English
- No. of seasons: 11
- No. of episodes: 154

Production
- Running time: 20 to 22 minutes
- Production company: North South Productions

Original release
- Network: TLC
- Release: July 30, 2010 – April 25, 2020

Related
- Say Yes to the Dress; Say Yes to the Dress: Bridesmaids

Say Yes to the Dress: Atlanta is an American reality television series on TLC which follows events at Bridals by Lori in the Atlanta suburb of Sandy Springs. The series shows the progress of individual sales associates, managers, and fitters at the store, along with profiling brides as they search for the perfect wedding dress. It is a spin-off of Say Yes to the Dress.

== Background ==
Say Yes to the Dress: Atlanta was first announced in July 2010. The show features Lori Allen, who has been the owner of Bridals by Lori in Atlanta since 1980. The shop was celebrating its 30th anniversary the year it was chosen as the setting of the show. The show also features image consultant Monte Durham. Other people featured on the show are Bridals by Lori manager Robin Gibbs and assistant manager Flo Waters. Durham and Allen were friends from working together previously, including on the television show Platinum Weddings, which led to Durham becoming the fashion director for the show.

In order to appear on the show, brides apply online and then go through a casting process. The brides and the families receive no compensation for appearing on the show, and are not obligated to purchase a dress from the store. Out of the 21 dressing rooms in the store, number a10 is used for the show. In 2012 the show also provided an opportunity for brides who were also breast cancer survivors to have the story of their weddings shown in special episodes of the series.

== Spin-offs ==
The Atlanta series itself generated two spin-offs:

- Say Yes to the Dress: Bridesmaids (July 2011-August 2013) is a spinoff focused on bridesmaid dresses and the bridesmaid showroom at Bridals by Lori.
- Say Yes to the Dress: Monte's Take (2011–2012) is a podcast hosted by Monte Durham, the bridal image consultant at Bridals by Lori and TLC Interactive Producer Candace Keener. The weekly podcast provides listeners wedding tips and tricks.

== Episodes ==
| Season | Episodes | Originally released | |
| Season | Episodes | First released | Last released |
|---|---|---|---|
| 1 | 12 | July 30, 2010 | September 24, 2010 |
| 2 | 18 | July 8, 2011 | September 30, 2011 |
| 3 | 18 | January 6, 2012 | April 6, 2012 |
| 4 | 18 | August 24, 2012 | September 7, 2012 |
| 5 | 18 | March 8, 2013 | May 17, 2013 |
| 6 | 18 | November 8, 2013 | January 31, 2014 |
| 7 | 18 | June 6, 2014 | August 8, 2014 |
| 8 | 18 | January 2, 2015 | February 27, 2015 |
| 9 | 17 | January 1, 2016 | February 26, 2016 |
| 10 | 10 | June 9, 2018 | August 11, 2018 |
| 11 | 6 | March 21, 2020 | April 25, 2020 |

=== Season 1 (2010) ===
| No. overall | No. in season | Title | Original release date |
|---|---|---|---|
| 1 | 1 | "Virgin Brides Wear Sleeves" | July 30, 2010 |
| 2 | 2 | "Breaking the Curse" | August 6, 2010 |
| 3 | 3 | "If Mama's Not Happy..." | August 6, 2010 |
| 4 | 4 | "The Full Monte" | August 13, 2010 |
| 5 | 5 | "Buyer's Remorse" | August 13, 2010 |
| 6 | 6 | "Head or Tails" | August 20, 2010 |
| 7 | 7 | "Looking for Support" | August 20, 2010 |
| 8 | 8 | "For Better or Worse" | August 27, 2010 |
| 9 | 9 | "When Push Turns to Shove" | September 3, 2010 |
| 10 | 10 | "Bridal Veterans" | September 10, 2010 |
| 11 | 11 | "In Mom's Absence" | September 17, 2010 |
| 12 | 12 | "The Royal Treatment" | September 24, 2010 |

=== Season 2 (2011) ===
| No. overall | No. in season | Title | Original release date |
|---|---|---|---|
| 13 | 1 | "Southern Mamas Are Hard, Y'all..." | July 8, 2011 |
| 14 | 2 | "Go Big or Go Home" | July 8, 2011 |
| 15 | 3 | "A Fox in the Henhouse" | July 15, 2011 |
| 16 | 4 | "Taming of the Shrews" | July 15, 2011 |
| 17 | 5 | "Mamas and Dramas and Tears, Oh My!" | July 22, 2011 |
| 18 | 6 | "Sibling Rivalry" | July 22, 2011 |
| 19 | 7 | "Be Bold" | July 29, 2011 |
| 20 | 8 | "Are You Looking for Trouble?" | July 29, 2011 |
| 21 | 9 | "Longest Appointment Ever..." | August 5, 2011 |
| 22 | 10 | "The Girl With the Dragon Tattoo" | August 5, 2011 |
| 23 | 11 | "Two Moms Are Better Than None" | August 12, 2011 |
| 24 | 12 | "Brothers and Mothers" | August 19, 2011 |
| 25 | 13 | "Brides With Baggage" | August 26, 2011 |
| 26 | 14 | "Everyone Says A-HA!" | September 2, 2011 |
| 27 | 15 | "Here Comes the Bride...and her Bride" | September 9, 2011 |
| 28 | 16 | "Power of the Purse" | September 16, 2011 |
| 29 | 17 | "Bride Knows Best" | September 23, 2011 |
| 30 | 18 | "No Boys Allowed..." | September 30, 2011 |

=== Season 3 (2012) ===
| No. overall | No. in season | Title | Original release date |
|---|---|---|---|
| 31 | 1 | "Dancing Queen" | January 6, 2012 |
| 32 | 2 | "Daddy's Girls" | January 6, 2012 |
| 33 | 3 | "Operation: Cinderella" | January 13, 2012 |
| 34 | 4 | "Vocal Training" | January 13, 2012 |
| 35 | 5 | "Tunnel Vision" | January 20, 2012 |
| 36 | 6 | "Mini Monte" | January 20, 2012 |
| 37 | 7 | "Modern Day Scarlett" | January 27, 2012 |
| 38 | 8 | "Fresh Start" | January 27, 2012 |
| 39 | 9 | "Mamas Know Best" | February 3, 2012 |
| 40 | 10 | "Double Mama Drama" | February 10, 2012 |
| 41 | 11 | "Live for Today, Hope for Tomorrow" | February 17, 2012 |
| 42 | 12 | "High Fashion Anxiety" | February 24, 2012 |
| 43 | 13 | "It's More Than a Dress" | March 2, 2012 |
| 44 | 14 | "Falling in Love" | March 9, 2012 |
| 45 | 15 | "Say No to the Ball Gown" | March 16, 2012 |
| 46 | 16 | "Father Knows Dress" | March 23, 2012 |
| 47 | 17 | "Stealing the Spotlight" | March 30, 2012 |
| 48 | 18 | "Meant to Be" | April 6, 2012 |

=== Season 4 (2012) ===
| No. overall | No. in season | Title | Original release date |
|---|---|---|---|
| 49 | 1 | "Country Girls Gone Wild" | August 24, 2012 |
| 50 | 2 | "Mommy-Daddy's Little Girl" | August 24, 2012 |
| 51 | 3 | "The Mouth of the South" | August 31, 2012 |
| 52 | 4 | "Three Cheers for the Bride!" | August 31, 2012 |
| 53 | 5 | "Sisters Act Out!" | September 7, 2012 |
| 54 | 6 | "Power Play" | September 7, 2012 |
| 55 | 7 | "Between a Sham-Rock and a Hard Place" | September 14, 2012 |
| 56 | 8 | "Blinded by Science" | September 14, 2012 |
| 57 | 9 | "Secret Princess" | September 21, 2012 |
| 58 | 10 | "Dueling Divas" | September 21, 2012 |
| 59 | 11 | "Never Been Kissed" | September 28, 2012 |
| 60 | 12 | "Skin Can't Win" | September 28, 2012 |
| 61 | 13 | "Bridal Floor Bullies" | October 5, 2012 |
| 62 | 14 | "Mama Gets Her Groove Back" | October 5, 2012 |
| 63 | 15 | "Dream Dress or Bust" | October 12, 2012 |
| 64 | 16 | "A Little Help From Her Friends" | October 12, 2012 |
| 65 | 17 | "Poof, There It Is!" | October 19, 2012 |
| 66 | 18 | "Baby Wants Blings" | October 19, 2012 |

=== Season 5 (2013) ===
| No. overall | No. in season | Title | Original release date | U.S. viewers (millions) |
|---|---|---|---|---|
| 67 | 1 | "Good News, Bad News" | March 8, 2013 | 1.32 |
| 68 | 2 | "Rockin' the Runway" | March 8, 2013 | 1.40 |
| 69 | 3 | "Country Girls Do Bridal Best" | March 15, 2013 | 1.06 |
| 70 | 4 | "Rolling With the Punches" | March 15, 2013 | 1.29 |
| 71 | 5 | "Thinking Outside of the Box" | March 22, 2013 | 1.33 |
| 72 | 6 | "Divas on the Defense" | March 22, 2013 | 1.46 |
| 73 | 7 | "Bucking Tradition" | March 29, 2013 | 1.23 |
| 74 | 8 | "Chocolate Milk, Mermaids and Mothers" | March 29, 2013 | 1.37 |
| 75 | 9 | "More Granny, More Problems" | April 5, 2013 | 1.49 |
| 76 | 10 | "The Bride Strikes Back" | April 5, 2013 | 1.72 |
| 77 | 11 | "I Do Again" | April 12, 2013 | 1.49 |
| 78 | 12 | "Princess Brides Beware" | April 12, 2013 | 1.51 |
| 79 | 13 | "No to the Bow" | April 19, 2013 | 1.03 |
| 80 | 14 | "Hope on a Hanger" | April 19, 2013 | 1.28 |
| 81 | 15 | "Tulle vs. Ta-Ta's" | April 26, 2013 | 1.38 |
| 82 | 16 | "Team Spirit" | May 3, 2013 | 0.95 |
| 83 | 17 | "Booty-do's and Ball Gowns" | May 10, 2013 | 1.21 |
| 84 | 18 | "The Family Feud" | May 17, 2013 | 1.15 |

=== Season 6 (2013–2014) ===
| No. overall | No. in season | Title | Original release date | U.S. viewers (millions) |
|---|---|---|---|---|
| 85 | 1 | "Extra-Special Day" | November 8, 2013 | 0.99 |
| 86 | 2 | "Bridal Sabotage" | November 8, 2013 | 1.05 |
| 87 | 3 | "Mom's Way or the Highway" | November 15, 2013 | 1.14 |
| 88 | 4 | "To Sleeve, or Not to Sleeve" | November 15, 2013 | 1.15 |
| 89 | 5 | "Playing Chicken" | November 22, 2013 | 1.00 |
| 90 | 6 | "Double Trouble" | November 22, 2013 | 1.05 |
| 91 | 7 | "Pastor Princess" | November 29, 2013 | N/A |
| 92 | 8 | "There's No I in Groom" | November 29, 2013 | N/A |
| 93 | 9 | "Brides by the Numbers" | December 6, 2013 | N/A |
| 94 | 10 | "Breaking the Bank" | December 6, 2013 | N/A |
| 95 | 11 | "No Time for Nostalgia" | December 27, 2013 | N/A |
| 96 | 12 | "Chances Are..." | January 3, 2014 | 1.23 |
| 97 | 13 | "Bride Overboard" | January 3, 2014 | 1.45 |
| 98 | 14 | "It Takes Two" | January 10, 2014 | 1.44 |
| 99 | 15 | "Shiny, Happy, Bling!" | January 10, 2014 | 1.49 |
| 100 | 16 | "Twelve's a Crowd" | January 17, 2014 | 1.25 |
| 101 | 17 | "Up the Aunt-ie" | January 24, 2014 | N/A |
| 102 | 18 | "By The Book" | January 31, 2014 | N/A |

=== Season 7 (2014) ===
| No. overall | No. in season | Title | Original release date |
|---|---|---|---|
| 103 | 1 | "The Bridal Countdown!" | June 6, 2014 |
| 104 | 2 | "Out of Bridal Bounds" | June 6, 2014 |
| 105 | 3 | "First Dresses and Second Guesses" | June 13, 2014 |
| 106 | 4 | "Bringing Bridal Back" | June 13, 2014 |
| 107 | 5 | "Battle of the Curves" | June 20, 2014 |
| 108 | 6 | "Once Upon a Bride" | June 20, 2014 |
| 109 | 7 | "The Big Picture" | June 27, 2014 |
| 110 | 8 | "Blush-ing Brides" | June 27, 2014 |
| 111 | 9 | "Dare to be Different" | July 11, 2014 |
| 112 | 10 | "Bridal Baggage Blues" | July 11, 2014 |
| 113 | 11 | "Eye of the Bridal Storm" | July 18, 2014 |
| 114 | 12 | "Gold Medal Gown" | July 18, 2014 |
| 115 | 13 | "A Dress With a Fighting Chance" | July 25, 2014 |
| 116 | 14 | "Worth the Weight" | July 25, 2014 |
| 117 | 15 | "The Ties That Bind" | August 1, 2014 |
| 118 | 16 | "Good Things Come to Those Who Wait" | August 1, 2014 |
| 119 | 17 | "Curves and Curveballs" | August 8, 2014 |
| 120 | 18 | "Times Are a Changing" | August 8, 2014 |

=== Season 8 (2015) ===
| No. overall | No. in season | Title | Original release date |
|---|---|---|---|
| 121 | 1 | "A Dress Against All Odds" | January 2, 2015 |
| 122 | 2 | "Whose Wedding is it Anyway?" | January 2, 2015 |
| 123 | 3 | "Fifty Shades of White" | January 9, 2015 |
| 124 | 4 | "Bridal Highs and Woes" | January 9, 2015 |
| 125 | 5 | "Wedding Gown Bro Down" | January 16, 2015 |
| 126 | 6 | "I Do... Does Dad?" | January 16, 2015 |
| 127 | 7 | "Runaway Bride, Runaway Budget" | January 16, 2015 |
| 128 | 8 | "Double Brides, Double Trouble" | January 23, 2015 |
| 129 | 9 | "Betting Against the Barn" | January 23, 2015 |
| 130 | 10 | "Love and Basketball" | January 30, 2015 |
| 131 | 11 | "No Room for the Groom" | January 30, 2015 |
| 132 | 12 | "A Dress Worth Saying I Do" | February 6, 2015 |
| 133 | 13 | "When the Leading Man Takes a Stand" | February 6, 2015 |
| 134 | 14 | "A Case of Tunnel Vision" | February 13, 2015 |
| 135 | 15 | "No Such Thing as a Country Dress" | February 13, 2015 |
| 136 | 16 | "Mother May I?" | February 20, 2015 |
| 137 | 17 | "A Bridal Change of the Heart" | February 27, 2015 |
| 138 | 18 | "The Most FANtastic Day Ever!" | February 27, 2015 |

=== Season 9 (2016) ===
| No. overall | No. in season | Title | Original release date |
|---|---|---|---|
| 139 | 1 | "Two Monte's Are Better Than One" | January 1, 2016 |
| 140 | 2 | "I Feel Fierce" | January 1, 2016 |
| 141 | 3 | "What Would Phaedra Do?" | January 8, 2016 |
| 142 | 4 | "A Little Sparkle Goes a Long Way" | January 8, 2016 |
| 143 | 5 | "Are You Ready to Play Bridal Blitz?" | January 15, 2016 |
| 144 | 6 | "My Big Fat Ethiopian Wedding" | January 15, 2016 |
| 145 | 7 | "Waiting for a Sign" | January 22, 2016 |
| 146 | 8 | "A Trio of Options" | January 22, 2016 |
| 147 | 9 | "Multiple Dress Personality Disorder" | January 29, 2016 |
| 148 | 10 | "I'll Just Call Myself the Original Diva" | January 29, 2016 |
| 149 | 11 | "If I Feel Like A Penny, I Need to Look Like a Million" | February 5, 2016 |
| 150 | 12 | "Gone With the Wind Fabulous" | February 5, 2016 |
| 151 | 13 | "88 and Out the Gate" | February 12, 2016 |
| 152 | 14 | "Gonna Sing You a Song 'Bout the Dress I Don't Have" | February 12, 2016 |
| 153 | 15 | "Rockabilly & Motorcycles" | February 19, 2016 |
| 154 | 16 | "Momma's Holdin' Back" | February 19, 2016 |
| 155 | 17 | "Mother of the Groom" | February 26, 2016 |

=== Season 10 (2018) ===
| No. overall | No. in season | Title | Original release date |
|---|---|---|---|
| 156 | 1 | "We've Got a Lot of Catching Up to Do" | June 9, 2018 |
| 157 | 2 | "Let Me Show Y'all How It's Done" | June 16, 2018 |
| 158 | 3 | "Paying It Forward" | June 23, 2018 |
| 159 | 4 | "I Feel Like I'm in Dress Heaven" | June 30, 2018 |
| 160 | 5 | "You Can't Give Every One a Rose" | July 7, 2018 |
| 161 | 6 | "Walking on Egg Shells" | July 14, 2018 |
| 162 | 7 | "Men of Honor?" | July 21, 2018 |
| 163 | 8 | "Somebody Just Turned on the Vixen!" | July 28, 2018 |
| 164 | 9 | "Way Out of My Comfort Zone" | August 4, 2018 |
| 165 | 10 | "It's Dani Day!" | August 11, 2018 |

=== Season 11 (2020) ===
| No. overall | No. in season | Title | Original release date |
|---|---|---|---|
| 164 | 1 | "Are They About to Fight?" | March 21, 2020 |
| 165 | 2 | "You're Fired!" | March 28, 2020 |
| 166 | 3 | "Y'all Are Trying To Please 11 Women" | April 4, 2020 |
| 167 | 4 | "Eleganza Dahling" | April 11, 2020 |
| 168 | 5 | "Twelve Years in the Making" | April 18, 2020 |
| 169 | 6 | "The Perfect Shade of Blue" | April 25, 2020 |
