= 2009 in Australian television =

This is a list of Australian television events and premieres which occurred in 2009. The year 2009 is the 54th year of continuous operation of television in Australia. It also marks the introduction of digital multichannels for the three commercial television networks (the Seven Network, the Nine Network and Network Ten), which were each able to launch an alternate standard-definition digital channel, separate from their primary channels, from 1 January. Network Ten launched their channel, One (later known today as 10 Bold), on 26 March, whilst the Nine Network launched kids and movies channel GO! (later known today as 9Go!) on 9 August, and the Seven Network launched catch-up channel 7Two on 1 November.

== Events ==
- 10 January – Peter Overton replaces Mark Ferguson as the anchor of Nine's 6:00 pm news bulletin in Sydney.
- 31 January – After being pulled by the Nine Network in 2008, McLeod's Daughters airs its final episode to a total viewership of 576,000.
- 7–14 February – All three commercial networks in Australia take major expensive news coverage of the 2009 Victorian Bushfires, in which 181 people lost their lives, including former Nine newsreader Brian Naylor and actor Reg Evans.
- 9 February – The premiere of Underbelly: A Tale of Two Cities sets the ratings record of the highest-rating Australian television series launch since the introduction of the OzTAM people meter system in 2001. The launch attracted 2.58 million viewers, and is also the highest rating non-sporting program in television history.
- 26 March – One HD launches.
- 20 April – After a mini-term absence, Who Wants to Be a Millionaire? returns to Nine with the newly launched title Hot Seat which launches in its 5.30pm. A few years later, Hot Seat overtook Deal or No Deal's lead-in the 5:30pm quiz-show battle in the lead-in to the 6pm news with Nine News regaining the lead nationally.
- 22 April – 15-year-old opera singer Mark Vincent wins the third season of Australia's Got Talent.
- 26 April – Talia Fowler wins the second season of So You Think You Can Dance Australia.
- 3 May – Rebecca Gibney wins the Gold Logie Award for the Most Popular Personality on Australian Television at the 2009 Logie Awards.
- 10 May – After protest in very bad ratings, Australian Idol decides to cancel its Monday Night Live Verdict show. The show becomes a Sunday night staple. Later in the year the show has landed up a whole year of poor ratings. The year ended when 19-year-old Stan Walker taking the title as the final series winner with Sony Music Australia defeating Hayley Warner. Idol was axed in January the following year.
- 12 May – The ABC receives an extra $136.4 million over three years from the 2009 federal budget to develop an advertising-free digital children's channel (ABC3), and increase its production of local drama to 90 hours a year, a similar level to the amount required by the commercial networks. The budget also allocated SBS an extra $20 million over the same period to produce up to 50 hours of new Australian content each year. This figure is significantly below the extra $70 million SBS were seeking per year.
- 13 May – Former rugby league footballer and The NRL Footy Show presenter, Matthew Johns, is suspended indefinitely from the program by the Nine Network following reports of his involvement in a group sex act with other Cronulla-Sutherland Sharks players in 2002. The incident was first reported on ABC1's current affairs program, Four Corners, on 11 May 2009.
- 18 May – It is revealed that Ajay Rochester will no longer be host of Channel Ten's The Biggest Loser, a position she has held since the series began in 2006, due to her desire to pursue new interests. Alison Braun, the runner-up of the show's third season, is believed to be one of the front-runners to be the new host.
- 3 June – A skit involving terminally ill children and the fictional 'Make a Realistic Wish Foundation' (a parody of the Make-a-Wish Foundation) causes public outrage after airing on an episode of The Chaser's War on Everything on ABC1. The skit involved The Chaser members Chris Taylor (as the foundation spokesperson) and Andrew Hansen (as a doctor). The premise of the skit was that if the terminally ill children are only going to live for a few more months before dying, it is not worth spending money on lavish gifts for them. It portrayed the children asking for extravagant items such as a trip to Disneyland and the chance to meet Zac Efron, with Taylor and Hansen instead giving them a pencil case and a stick respectively. The skit concluded with Taylor stating "Why go to any trouble, when they're only gonna die anyway". Following public criticism of the skit, both The Chaser and the Australian Broadcasting Corporation issued statements of apology. The ABC subsequently suspended the series for two weeks following the controversy. The series will return on 24 June.
- 8 June – Gordon Ramsay called Tracy Grimshaw 'a pig' in an interview for A Current Affair. Also on 8 June, Barry Soraghan becomes the first person to miss the final question on Millionaire Hot Seat.
- 10 June – The Nine Network announces the third series of Underbelly will be titled Underbelly: The Golden Mile, and would focus on Kings Cross in Sydney, beginning in 1989, and also include the Wood Royal Commission into police corruption.
- 20 June – After getting into big trouble about scrapping the rights to Warner Bros., the Nine Network's proposed new channel becomes a light-entertainment channel for younger people, dropping Light Entertainment, Retro, Variety and Lifestyle from taking part (didn't use until GEM launched the following year). GO! was officially launched 9 August to become "Australia No. 1 digital channel".
- 26 June – Nine News takes major expensive coverage about the deaths of Michael Jackson and Farrah Fawcett. Also, The final edition of Extra presented by Heather Foord goes to air in Brisbane and Bruce Paige presents his final weeknight bulletin on Nine News Queensland; he is replaced the following Monday by Andrew Lofthouse, who along with Melissa Downes remain in their roles as of today.
- 19 July – A 38-year-old mother of three, Julie Goodwin wins the first series of MasterChef Australia, beating 35-year-old artist Poh Ling Yeow, with the Grand Final recorded the ratings over 3 million people tuning in.
- 7 August – Tracey McBean has been sold for broadcasting in Singapore. The series premiered on Okto at 6:00pm.
- 6 September – Country singer Adam Brand and his partner Jade Hatcher win the ninth season of Dancing with the Stars.
- 25 September – Mark Ferguson presents his final bulletin on the Nine Network before moving to the rival Seven Network, where he remains as of today.
- 28 September – Jeff Tarr becomes the second person to miss the final question on Millionaire Hot Seat.
- 30 September – 2.64 million people tuned into the first Hey Hey It's Saturday reunion special to see the return of Daryl Somers and the gang.
- 7 October – A "Red Faces" segment in the second of two Hey Hey It's Saturday reunion specials causes international catastrophe when the performers for Act 2 appear in blackface performing a tribute to the music of Michael Jackson. Guest judge Harry Connick, Jr. scores a O for the act while criticizes the segment as offensive and did not like the music of Michael Jackson. Hours later, Somers apologizes to him on air to say "sorry". During the replay of GO! broadcasts, when Act 1 finished, the show went to a commercial break and came back for Act 3, after Connick's 2nd performance from a number, it went to a final commercial break in time for the grand finale. Hours after the reunion show, Connick Jr. was fired and banned for life.
- 21 October – A giant seagull appears behind Nine News Melbourne newsreader Peter Hitchener during the 6:00 pm news.
- 25 October – Australian television legend Don Lane dies of long battle with illness, he was 75.
- 27 October – After 12 years on air, the multi-awarding winning medical drama All Saints aired its last episode to a total viewership of 1,512,000.
- 1 November – 7TWO launches, after failing to soft launch two days earlier.
- 22 November – Stan Walker wins the seventh and final season of Australian Idol.
- 25 November – Eamon Sullivan wins Celebrity MasterChef Australia.
- 26 November – Empire of the Sun wins Single and Album of the Year at the 2009 ARIA Awards.
- 27 November – Former Today and Seven News presenter Ian Ross retires after over half a century on air.
- 30 November – Nine News relaunches its graphics after its worst ratings year on record.
- 4 December – ABC3 launches.
- 4 December – Federal Communications Minister Senator Stephen Conroy announces that Community television stations will receive $2.6 million in federal funding and the suitable spectrum to enable to begin digital simulcasts.

== Notable celebrity deaths ==
| Name | Age | Date of death | Occupation | Ref |
|---|---|---|---|---|
| Ernie Bourne | 82 | 21 January | Actor (Adventure Island) | |
| Reg Evans | 80 | 7 February | Actor in numerous Australian films and TV series | |
| Brian Naylor | 78 | 8 February | Seven Network and later Nine Network newsreader | |
| Penny Ramsey | 61 | 11 February | Actor in numerous Australian films and TV series | |
| Frank Gallacher | 65 | 24 February | Actor in numerous Australian films and TV series | |
| Peter Wherrett | 72 | 23 March | Host of Torque | |
| John Sorell | 72 | 10 April | Former Nine News Melbourne director (1975–2003) | |
| Rob Dickson | 45 | 11 April | Documentary filmmaker; winner of Australian Survivor | |
| Albert Asbury | 69 | 1 May | Former ABC News Brisbane journalist and chief of staff (1976–2008) | |
| Bud Tingwell | 86 | 15 May | Actor in numerous Australian films and TV series | |
| Matthew Krel | 64 | 20 May | SBS Youth Orchestra Conductor | |
| Ross Coleman | 60 | 27 July | Choreographer and dancer on Bandstand and The Don Lane Show | |
| Ray Barrett | 82 | 8 September | Actor in numerous Australian films and TV series | |
| Mike Leyland | 68 | 14 September | Co-host Ask the Leyland Brothers | |
| Gordon Boyd | 86 | 8 October | Game show host, (showcase) | |
| Paul Williams | ? | 11 October | SBS Football commentator | |
| Don Lane | 75 | 22 October | Host of The Don Lane Show | |
| Su Cruickshank | 63 | 8 December | Actress in numerous Australian films and TV series | |

=== Channels ===
==== New channels ====
- 20 January – A-PAC
- 26 March – One
- 1 June – SBS Two
- 2 July – One (Southern Cross Ten)
- 9 August – Go!
- 1 November – 7TWO
- 15 November – 13th Street
- 15 November – Lifestyle YOU
- 15 November – Discovery Turbo MAX
- 15 November – Style Network
- 15 November – NAT GEO WILD
- 15 November – Family Movie Channel
- 15 November – KidsCo
- 15 November – Showtime Drama (replacing Showtime Greats)
- 15 November – Showtime Comedy (replacing Showtime Greats)
- 15 November – Showtime Action (replacing Showtime Greats)
- 15 November – STARPICS 1
- 15 November – 111 Hits+2
- 15 November – Discovery Channel+2
- 15 November – Lifestyle YOU+2
- 15 November – Discovery Turbo MAX+2
- 15 November – Sci Fi+2
- 15 November – STARPICS 2
- 15 November – Showcase 2
- 15 November – LifeStyle Food+2
- 15 November – UKTV HD (replacing BBC HD)
- 15 November – FOX8 HD
- 15 November – W HD
- 15 November – Showtime Premiere HD
- 15 November – Showcase HD
- 15 November – Showtime Action HD
- 15 November – STARPICS 1 HD
- 15 November – STARPICS 2 HD
- 15 November – Fox Sports 1 HD (replacing Fox Sports HD)
- 15 November – Fox Sports 2 HD (replacing Fox Sports HD)
- 15 November – Fox Sports 3 HD (replacing Fox Sports HD)
- 29 November – 7TWO (Southern Cross Tasmania)
- 4 December – ABC3
- 23 December – 7TWO ON PRIME (Prime Television)

==== Defunct channels ====
- 15 January – Interactive Sports Selector (Channel 500 on Foxtel)
- 26 March – Ten HD (replaced by ONE)
- 1 June – SBS World News Channel (replaced by SBS Two)
- 30 June – Gamesworld (Channel 555 on Foxtel)
- 2 August – Nine HD (replaced by Nine Network HD simulcast)
- 15 November – Fox Sports HD (replaced with Fox Sports 1 HD, Fox Sports 2 HD and Fox Sports 3 HD)
- 15 November – BBC HD (replaced with UKTV HD)
- 15 November – Showtime Greats (replaced with Showtime Drama, Showtime Comedy and Showtime Action)

==== Renamed channels ====
- 15 November – showtime premiere (formerly Showtime)
- 15 November – [V] Hits (formerly Channel [V]^{2})

== Premieres ==
=== Telemovies ===
Domestic telemovie premieres on Australian television in 2009
| Telemovie | Network | Original airdate(s) | Ref |
|---|---|---|---|
| The Eternity Man | ABC1 | 18 January | |
| The Last Confession of Alexander Pearce | ABC1 | 25 January | |
| Chainsaw | SBS TV | 27 January | |
| One of the Lucky Ones | SBS TV | 3 February | |
| Rogue Nation | ABC1 | 15 March | |
| Motorcycle Karma | Nat Geo Adventure | 2 April | |
| Saved | SBS TV | 12 April | |
| 3 Acts of Murder | ABC1 | 14 June | |
| A Model Daughter: The Killing of Caroline Byrne | Network Ten | 4 November | |
| Samson and Delilah | ABC1 | 22 November | |
| Dungoona (formerly titled Wauchope) | MTV | 13 December | |

International telemovie premieres on Australian television in 2009
| Program | Country of origin | Network | Original airdate(s) | Ref |
|---|---|---|---|---|
| Coming Down the Mountain | United Kingdom | ABC2 | 2 January | |
| Magnificent 7 | United Kingdom | ABC1 | 4 January | |
| Lusitania: Murder on the Atlantic | United Kingdom, Germany | ABC1 | 11 January | |
| The Somme | United Kingdom | ABC1 | 18 January | |
| The Trial of Tony Blair | United Kingdom | ABC1 | 18 January | |
| Fanny Hill | United Kingdom | ABC1 | 25 January | |
| The Cheetah Girls: One World | United States | Disney Channel | 30 January | |
| Gym Teacher: The Movie | United States | Nickelodeon | 21 February | |
| Dadnapped | United States | Disney Channel | 28 February | |
| Spectacular! | United States | Nickelodeon | 16 May | |
| Spectacular! | United States | Network Ten | 18 September | |
| Filth: The Mary Whitehouse Story | United Kingdom | ABC1 | 31 May | |
| Short Stay in Switzerland | United Kingdom | BBC HD | 17 September | |
| Grey Gardens | United States | Showcase | 19 September | |
| The 39 Steps | United Kingdom | ABC1 | 18 October | |
| Wuthering Heights | United Kingdom | ABC1 | 25 October | |
| Ben 10: Alien Swarm | United States | Cartoon Network | 28 November | |
| Albert's Memorial | United Kingdom | ABC1 | 13 December | |
| Clash of the Santas | United Kingdom | ABC1 | 24 December | |
| The Man Who Lost His Head | United Kingdom, New Zealand | ABC1 | 25 December | |
| A Room with a View | United Kingdom | ABC1 | Unknown | |

=== Miniseries ===
Domestic miniseries premieres on Australian television in 2009
| Miniseries | Network(s) | Original airdate(s) | Ref |
|---|---|---|---|
| False Witness | UK.TV, BBC HD | 11, 12 January | |

International miniseries premieres on Australian television in 2009
| Miniseries | Country of origin | Network | Original airdate(s) | Ref |
|---|---|---|---|---|
| Messiah V: The Rapture | United Kingdom | UKTV | 15, 22 March | |
| Sunshine | United Kingdom | UKTV | 13, 20, 27 April | |
| House of Saddam | United Kingdom | Showcase | 5, 12, 19, 26 May | |
| Unforgiven | United Kingdom | UKTV | 26 July, 2 and 9 August | |
| Frank Herbert's Children of Dune | United States | Go! | 2, 9 October | |
| Red Dwarf: Back to Earth | United Kingdom | ABC2 | 30 November, 7 and 14 December | |
| Oliver Twist | United Kingdom | ABC1 | 20, 27 December | |

=== Documentary specials ===
Domestic documentary premieres on Australian television in 2009
| Documentary | Network(s) | Original airdate(s) | Ref |
|---|---|---|---|
| Destiny in Alice | ABC1 | 1 January | |
| Courting with Justice | ABC1 | 8 January | |
| Nigger Lovers | ABC1 | 15 January | |
| The Spirit of Australian Sport: Tennis | The History Channel | 17 January | |
| The Safe House | SBS TV | 20 January | |
| When the Natives Get Restless | ABC1 | 22 January | |
| Glass: A Portrait of Philip in Twelve Parts^{[a]} | ABC1 | 26 January | |
| Flour, Sugar and Tea | ABC1 | 29 January | |
| Best Undressed | SBS TV | 6 February | |
| The Man Inside Dame Edna | ABC1 | 12 February | |
| River of No Return | SBS TV | 13 February | |
| In Memory of Maia | Network Ten | 15 February | |
| Tibet: Murder in the Snow | SBS TV | 19 February | |
| The Stamp of Australia | The History Channel | 23, 30 March | |
| Bombora: The Story of Australian Surfing | ABC1 | 26 March, 2 April | |
| Artscape: Anatomy | ABC1 | 14 April | |
| Solo | ABC1 | 16 April | |
| CMC Rocks the Snowys | Country Music Channel | 17 April | |
| For Valour | The History Channel | 25 April | |
| Rock + Roll Nerd: The Tim Minchin Story | ABC1 | 30 April | |
| Forecast for Disaster: The Weather Behind Black Saturday | The Weather Channel | 2 May | |
| Bomb Harvest | Discovery HD | 11 May | |
| Trimbole: The Real Underbelly | Nine Network | 11 May | |
| Something in the Water | ABC2 | 13 May | |
| Friday on My Mind | SBS TV | 22 May | |
| Ned Kelly Uncovered | ABC1 | 9 July | |
| Liberal Rule: The Politics That Changed Australia | SBS TV | 21 July | |
| Cassowaries | ABC1 | 26 July | |
| Community Cop | SBS One | 13 September | |
| Skippy: Australia's First Superstar | ABC1 | 17 September | |
| Blank Canvas | Bio. | 3 October | |
| Dead Famous | ABC1 | 8 October | |
| Whale Patrol | ABC1 | 15 October | |
| The Great Escape: The Reckoning | ABC1 | 29 October | |
| Rainforest: The Secret of Life | ABC1 | 1 November | |
| Addicted to Money | ABC1 | 5, 12, 19 November | |
| Darwin's Brave New World | ABC1 | 8, 15, 22 November | |
| Ko Ho Nas (formerly known as Kill or Die) | SBS One | 9 November | |
| The Tragedy of the Montevideo Maru | The History Channel | 11 November | |
| Surviving Mumbai | ABC1 | 26 November | |
| World Champion Santa | ABC1 | 24 December | |
| Operation Croc | Seven Network | 27 December | |
| Operation Jumbo | ABC1 | 27 December | |
| Pieces of Me | ABC1 | 29 December | |
| Lost Years: A Sea Turtle Odyssey (formerly known as Loggerheads: The Lost Years) | SBS One | 28 November 2010 | |

International documentary premieres on Australian television in 2009
| Program | Country of origin | Network | Original airdate(s) | Ref |
|---|---|---|---|---|
| Lunch with Madame Murat | France | SBS TV | 1 January | |
| The Story of 1 | United Kingdom | ABC1 | 1 January | |
| Evolve | United States | The History Channel | 4 January | |
| Journey to the Edge of the Universe | United Kingdom, United States | National Geographic Channel | 4 January | |
| The Lobotomist | United States | SBS TV | 4 January | |
| Nigel Marven's Ugly Animals | United Kingdom | ABC1 | 4 January | |
| Gangland Graveyard | United States | ABC1 | 5 January | |
| Blood and Guts: A History of Surgery | United Kingdom | SBS TV | 6 January | |
| Everest ER | United States | ABC1 | 8 January | |
| Who Killed Stalin? | United Kingdom | ABC1 | 8 January | |
| Hubble's Final Frontier | United Kingdom | National Geographic Channel | 10 January | |
| Penguins of the Antarctic | United Kingdom, United States | ABC1 | 11 January | |
| Changing Climates, Changing Times | France, Canada | SBS TV | 11 January | |
| The House of Windsor: A Royal Dynasty | United Kingdom | ABC1 | 12 January | |
| Dreams of Obama | United States | ABC1 | 16 January | |
| Martian Robots | United Kingdom | National Geographic Channel | 17 January | |
| An Eye for an Elephant | United Kingdom | ABC1 | 18 January | |
| Made in Chicago: The Making of Barack Obama | United States | ABC1 | 19 January | |
| Monster of the Milky Way | United States | National Geographic Channel | 24 January | |
| 2050: How Soon Is Now? | Spain | ABC1 | 26 January | |
| How to Live to 101 Without Trying | United Kingdom | SBS TV | 27 January | |
| Death of the Universe | United States | National Geographic Channel | 31 January | |
| Cherub of the Mist | India | ABC1 | 1 February | |
| Born to be King: Prince Charles at 60 | United States | ABC1 | 2 February | |
| 1983: The Brink of Apocalypse (a.k.a. Soviet War Scare 1983) | United States | ABC1 | 2 February | |
| The Girl Who Lives in the Dark | United Kingdom | SBS TV | 10 February | |
| India Reborn | Canada, Germany, United Kingdom, France | SBS TV | 10 February | |
| Wild Caribbean | United Kingdom | ABC1 | 15 February | |
| Death of a Nation | United Kingdom | ABC1 | 16 February | |
| How Does Your Memory Work? | United Kingdom | SBS TV | 17 February | |
| Bringing Up Baby | United Kingdom | ABC1 | 19 February | |
| The Machine That Made Us | United Kingdom | SBS TV | 20 February | |
| A Lady's Guide to Brothels | United Kingdom | SBS TV | 20 February | |
| How Life Began | United States | The History Channel | February | |
| All About Dung | United States | The History Channel | 15 March | |
| The Boyz Are Back in Town | United Kingdom | ABC2 | 10 April | |
| Jade Goody | United Kingdom | Bio. | 19 April | |
| 13 Kids & Wanting More | United Kingdom | The LifeStyle Channel | 7 May | |
| Ancient Ink | United States | The History Channel | 8 May | |
| In the Womb: Identical Twins | United Kingdom | National Geographic Channel HD | 10 May | |
| Earthquake: Panda Rescue | Unknown | Animal Planet | 12 May | |
| When Borat Came to Town | Netherlands, Romania | SBS TV | 12 May | |
| Ben Stiller | United States | Bio. | 13 May | |
| China's Last Elephants | United Kingdom, Germany | Animal Planet | 17 May | |
| Stanley Kubrick's Boxes | United Kingdom | ABC2 | 17 May | |
| Ice Vegas | United States | National Geographic Channel HD | 20 May | |
| The Perfect Vagina | United Kingdom | SBS One | 22 May | |
| Louis Theroux: Law and Disorder in Philadelphia | United Kingdom | Seven Network | 25 May | |
| The Road to Guantanamo | United Kingdom | SBS TV | 26 May | |
| The Journalist and the Jihadi: The Murder of Daniel Pearl | United States | Crime & Investigation Network | 27 May | |
| Kung Fu Inc. | Unknown | National Geographic Channel HD | 27 May | |
| Superstar on Trial: Mexico's Madonna | Mexico | Crime & Investigation Network | 10 June | |
| The Sci Fi Boys | United States | Sci-Fi | 24 June, 1 July | |
| Gok Wan: Too Fat Too Young | United Kingdom | The LifeStyle Channel | 30 June | |
| The Beckoning Silence | United Kingdom | The History Channel | 16 July | |
| We Are Wizards | United States | ABC2 | 22 July | |
| Miracle of the Hudson Plane Crash | United States, United Kingdom | Seven Network | 3 August | |
| Josef Fritzl: Story of a Monster | United Kingdom | Crime & Investigation Network | 19 August | |
| Battle at Kruger Park (a.k.a. Caught on Safari: Battle at Kruger) | United States | Seven Network | 31 August | |
| Waltz with Bashir | Israel | SBS One | 1 September | |
| Pedigree Dogs Exposed | United Kingdom | ABC1 | 10 September | |
| Inside the Wonders of the Muslim World | United States | SBS One | 11 September | |
| The Human Family Tree | United States | National Geographic Channel | 11 October | |
| Theater of War | United States | ABC2 | 8 November | |
| Fergie: Duchess on a Mission | United Kingdom | Nine Network | 12 November | |
| Addicted to Boob Jobs | United Kingdom | LifeStyle You | 15 November | |
| Britney: Speared by the Paps | United Kingdom | MTV | 15 November | |
| The Magic of Audrey | United States | ABC2 | 15 November | |
| What a Difference a Day Made: Doris Day Superstar | Germany | ABC2 | 22 November | |
| Unlikely Animal Friends | Unknown | Seven Network | 24 November | |
| Louis Theroux: A Place for Pedophiles | United Kingdom | BBC Knowledge | 28 November | |
| Joanna Lumley in the Land of the Northern Lights | United Kingdom | ABC1 | 29 November | |
| Prince Charles' Other Mistress | United Kingdom | ABC1 | 1 December | |
| Sex Positive | United States | SBS One | 1 December | |
| I Killed John Lennon | United Kingdom | Crime & Investigation Network | 8 December | |
| Snowdon and Margaret: Inside a Royal Marriage | United Kingdom | ABC1 | 8 December | |
| Backstairs Billy: The Queen Mum's Butler | United Kingdom | ABC1 | 15 December | |
| Hitler's Favourite Royal | United Kingdom | ABC1 | 22 December | |
| The Legends of Santa | United Kingdom | SBS One | 23 December | |
| Final Chance to Save the Orangutans with Joanna Lumley | United Kingdom | ABC1 | 26 December | |
| The Queen's Coronation: Behind Palace Doors | United Kingdom | ABC1 | 29 December | |
| I Dreamed a Dream: The Susan Boyle Story | United Kingdom | UK.TV | 30 December | |

| Date | Program | Channel |
|---|---|---|
Domestic
| Still to debut | Kokoda | ABC1 |
| Still to debut | The Mission | ABC1 |
| Still to debut | A Pacific Solution | SBS TV |
| Still to debut | Penguin Island | ABC1 |
| Still to debut | Salam Father | SBS TV |
| Still to debut | Shintaro | SBS TV |
| Still to debut | Under Southern Seas | ABC1 |
| Still to debut | Westall 1966: A Suburban UFO Mystery | TBA |
| Still to debut | The Conditions of Love | TBA |
| Still to debut | Immortal | TBA |
| Still to debut | Inside the Firestorm | ABC1 |
| Still to debut | Murundak - Songs of Freedom | TBA |
| Still to debut | From the Ashes | ABC Television |
| Still to debut | Accentuate the Positive | ABC Television |
| Still to debut | Jandamarra | ABC Television |
International
| 2008 | Richard Hammond's Engineering Connections | National Geographic Channel |
| 30 May | Richard Hammond's Engineering Connections | SBS TV |
| 10 August | On Board Air Force One | Seven Network |
| June | On Board Air Force One | National Geographic Channel |
| Still to debut | Loose Change 9/11: An American Coup | Foxtel |
| Still to debut | The Nomad Trail | ABC Television |
| Still to debut | Sales, Seduction and Sex | SBS Television |
| Still to debut | Skin Deep | SBS Television |

| Date | Program | Channel |
|---|---|---|
Domestic
| Still to debut | 1606 and 1770: A Tale of Two Discoveries | TBA |
| Still to debut | Gallipoli's Deep Secrets | The History Channel |
| Still to debut | As Australian As | The History Channel |
International
| 2008 | (United Kingdom) Richard Hammond's Engineering Connections | National Geographic Channel |
| 30 May | (United Kingdom) Richard Hammond's Engineering Connections | SBS TV |
| 10 August | (United States) Air Force One | Seven Network |
| June | (United States) Air Force One | National Geographic Channel |

=== Specials ===
| Date | Program | Channel |
|---|---|---|
Domestic
| 25 January | Announcement of the 2009 Australian of the Year | Nine Network |
| 1 February | 2009 Country Music Awards of Australia | Network Ten |
| 14 February | 2009 Country Music Awards of Australia | Country Music Channel |
| 3 February | 2009 Allan Border Medal | Nine Network |
| 8 February | Marty Rhone: A Tribute to Cliff Richard and the Shadows | ABC1 |
| 12 February | Australia Unites (Bushfire telethon) | Nine Network |
| 13 February | Geoffrey Robertson's Hypothetical Closing the Gap | NITV |
| 13 February | After The Fire: An ABC News Special | ABC1 |
| 22 February | National Day of Mourning Service | ABC1 |
| 22 February | National Day of Mourning Service | SBS TV |
| 22 February | National Day of Mourning Service | Seven Network |
| 22 February | National Day of Mourning Service | Nine Network |
| 22 February | National Day of Mourning Service | Network Ten |
| 22 February | Tropfest 2009 | Movie Extra |
| 11 April | Tropfest 2009 | Nine Network |
| 20 March | Essence of the Game | Seven Network |
| 27 March | MTV Australia Awards 2009 | MTV |
| 18 April | MTV Australia Awards 2009 | Seven Network |
| 30 March | 2009 Melbourne International Comedy Gala | Network Ten |
| 10 April | 2009 Good Friday Appeal | Seven Network (Melbourne) |
| 22 April | Firebird and Other Legends | ABC2 |
| 25 April | ABC's coverage of ANZAC Day | ABC1, ABC2 and ABC HD |
| 5 May | Christian the Lion special | Seven Network |
| 27 June | Michael Jackson: The King of Pop | Nine Network |
| 4 July | The Latest on Michael Jackson | Nine Network |
| 6 July | Triple J TV presents Lily Allen | ABC2 |
| 13 July | 2009 Melbourne International Comedy Debate | Network Ten |
| 15 August | 50 Years of Television | Nine Network (Brisbane) |
| 22 August | Coming Home | Seven Network |
| 29 August | ARIA Hall of Fame 2009 | Nine Network |
| 8 September | World Food Spectacular | Seven Network |
| 10 September | Hamish & Andy's American Caravan of Courage | Network Ten |
| 20 September | TV's Best of the Best | Nine Network |
| 21 September | 2009 Brownlow Medal | Seven Network |
| 22 September | The Very Best of the Paul Hogan Show (Part 1) | Nine Network |
| 30 September and 7 October | Hey Hey It's Saturday: Reunion specials | Nine Network |
| 18 October | The 2009 Deadlys | SBS One |
| 31 October and 7 November | 2009 Rock Eisteddfod Challenge | ABC1 |
| 17 November | The Very Best of the Paul Hogan Show (Part 2) | Nine Network |
| 17 November | Rove Presents Hamish & Andy Regifted, Another Very Early Christmas Special | Network Ten |
| 19 November | 2009 IF Awards | SBS One |
| 20 November | 2009 IF Awards | showcase |
| 8 November | 2009 Andrew Olle Media Lecture | ABC1 |
| 12 December | 2009 AFI Awards | Nine Network |
| 26 November | 2009 Aria Awards | Nine Network |
| 27 November | 2009 Aria Awards | MTV |
| 26 November | 2009 Walkley Awards | SBS One |
| 10 December | The New Black | ABC1 |
| 11 December | John Safran: Media Tycoon | ABC1 |
| 13 December | Hulkamania (Was pulled from schedule two days before it was to air due to circumstances surrounding the Australian promoter of the event) | One |
| 13 December | 2009 Schools Spectacular | ABC1 |
| 19 December | 2009 Carols in the Domain | Seven Network |
| 24 December | 2009 Carols by Candlelight | Nine Network |
| 24 December | Carols from St George's Cathedral 2009 | ABC1 |
| 25 December | 2009 Australian Dancesport Championships | Seven Network |
| 31 December | Sydney Symphony with Human Nature | ABC1 |
| 31 December | The Noughties: A Decade in Review | Nine Network |
| 31 December | 2009 New Year's Eve ARIA Countdown | Nine Network |
| 31 December | Shaun Micallef's New Year's Rave | Network Ten |
| 31 December | Sydney's New Year's Eve Fireworks | Nine Network |
International
| 1 January | 2009 Vienna New Year's Concert | SBS TV |
| 3 January | 30 Best and Worst Beach Bodies | Network Ten |
| 4 January | 119th Annual Rose Parade | Seven Network |
| 10 January | 40 Smokin' On-Set Hookups | Network Ten |
| 21 January | Barack Obama 2009 presidential inauguration | ABC1 |
| 21 January | Barack Obama 2009 presidential inauguration | SBS TV |
| 21 January | Barack Obama 2009 presidential inauguration | Seven Network |
| 21 January | Barack Obama 2009 presidential inauguration | Nine Network |
| 21 January | Barack Obama 2009 presidential inauguration | Network Ten |
| 2 February | Lost: Destiny Calls | Seven Network |
| 23 February | 81st Academy Awards | Nine Network |
| 23 February | 81st Academy Awards | Movie Extra |
| ?? February | Spielberg on Spielberg | Bio. |
| 11 March | Stand Up: Muslim-American Comics Come of Age | ABC2 |
| 12 March | Status Quo: The Party Ain't Over Yet | ABC1 |
| 4 April | Sesame Street: Coming Home | ABC2 |
| 13 April | I Get That a Lot | Network Ten |
| 13 April | Just for Laughs special | Network Ten |
| 20 April | Celebrity Plastic Surgery: The Good, the Bags and the Ugly | Network Ten |
| 10 May | Spielberg on Spielberg | ABC2 |
| 15, 16 and 17 May | Eurovision Song Contest 2009 | SBS TV |
| 1 May | 2008 BBC Electric Proms | ABC2 |
| 11 May | Lost: The Story of the Oceanic 6 | Seven Network |
| 27 May | Lost: A Journey in Time | Seven Network |
| 31 May | Planet of the Dead | ABC1 |
| 13 June | San Remo Song Festival | SBS One |
| 26 June | The Life and Death of Michael Jackson | Network Ten |
| 29 June | The Michael Jackson Story | Seven Network |
| 1 July | Michael Jackson: What Really Happened? | Nine Network |
| 1 July | Michael Jackson: Picking up the Pieces | Network Ten |
| 3 July | Tigger and Pooh and A Musical Too | Seven Network |
| 5 July | Secrets of Merlin | Network Ten |
| 6 July | Michael Jackson: 30th Anniversary Special (Retitled Michael Jackson: The Last Time and most likely a repeat) | Seven Network |
| 20 July | Wire in the Blood (USA episode "Prayer of the Bone") | ABC2 |
| 5 August | Jamie Saves Our Bacon | Network Ten |
| 13 August | Surviving Sextuplets and Twins | Network Ten |
| 20 August | The 45 Stone Virgin | Network Ten |
| 22 August | Pearl Jam: Live in Cornice, Italy | Nine Network |
| 22 August | Hot August Night NYC | Nine Network |
| 24 August | Miss Universe 2009 | Seven Network |
| 30 August | 2009 Teen Choice Awards | Network Ten |
| 5 September | Neil Diamond: Welcome Home Neil | Nine Network |
| 10 September | The Beatles in the Studio | Nine Network |
| 3 November | My Friend Michael Jackson: Uri's Story | Seven Network |
| 22 November | 2009 British Comedy Gala | Network Ten |
| 22 November | Pet Shop Boys at the BBC | ABC2 |
| 6 December | The Waters of Mars | ABC2 |
| 15 December | Christmas at the White House: An Oprah Primetime Special | Network Ten |
| 21 December | The Making of Back to Earth | ABC2 |
| 22 December | Dannii Minogue: My Story | Seven Network |
| 24 December | 2009 Nobel Peace Prize Concert | ABC2 |
| 24 December | 2009 Victoria's Secret Fashion Show | Network Ten |
| 25 December | Prep & Landing | Seven Network |
| 25 December | The Queen's Christmas Message 2009 | ABC1 / UK.TV / Nine Network |
| 31 December | U2 Equals BBC | ABC2 |
| 31 December | Seal Soul Live | ABC2 |
| Still to debut | 2008 Radio 1's Big Weekend | ABC2 |

| Date | Program | Channel |
|---|---|---|
Domestic
| 1 February | 2009 Country Music Awards of Australia | Network Ten |
| 14 February | 2009 Country Music Awards of Australia | Country Music Channel |
| 13 February | Frozen in Time | FOX8 |
| 13 February | Geoffrey Robertson's Hypothetical Closing the Gap | NITV |
| 22 February | Tropfest 2009 | Movie Extra |
| 11 April | Tropfest 2009 | Nine Network |
| 7 March | Sydney Gay and Lesbian Mardi Gras | Main Event |
| 14 March | Sound Relief (Sydney concert) | MAX |
| 27 September | Sound Relief (Sydney concert) | Nine Network |
| 14 March | Sound Relief (Melbourne concert) | Channel [V] |
| 27 September | Sound Relief (Melbourne concert) | Nine Network |
| 27 March | MTV Australia Awards 2009 | MTV |
| 18 April | MTV Australia Awards 2009 | Seven Network |
| 21 April | 2009 ASTRA Awards | Various Foxtel channels |
| 22 April | Firebird and Other Legends | ABC2 |
| 2 May | An Audience with Tina Arena | Bio. |
| 23 May | Cracker Night 2009 | The Comedy Channel |
| 27 June | Bernadette Peters in Concert: Live from the Adelaide Cabaret Festival | Bio. |
| 5 July | 2009 APRA Music Awards | MAX |
| 27 July | 2009 Helpmann Awards | Bio. |
| 2 August | Live: Jet | Channel [V] |
| 1 November | The Breast Darn Show in Town | The Comedy Channel |
| 13 November | Nickelodeon Australian Kids' Choice Awards 2009 | Nickelodeon Australia |
| 26 November | 2009 Aria Awards | Nine Network |
| 27 November | 2009 Aria Awards | MTV |
| 3 December | I Can't Believe It's Not Better | The Comedy Channel |
| 20 December | An Evening with Michael Parkinson | UK.TV |
| Still to debut | Sydney Dance Company specials | Bio. |
International
| 9 January | (United Kingdom) The Hairy Bikers Come Home | The LifeStyle Channel |
| 12 January | (United States) 66th Golden Globe Awards | Arena |
| 18 January | (United States) The Powerpuff Girls Rule!!! | Cartoon Network |
| 26 January | (United States) 15th Screen Actors Guild Awards | Showcase |
| 9 February | (United States) 51st Grammy Awards | Arena |
| 9 February | (United Kingdom) 62nd British Academy Film Awards | Bio. |
| 23 February | (United States) 81st Academy Awards | Nine Network |
| 23 February | (United States) 81st Academy Awards | Movie Extra |
| 26 February | (United Kingdom) 2009 BRIT Awards | Channel [V] |
| ?? February | (United States) Spielberg on Spielberg | Bio. |
| 10 May | (United States) Spielberg on Spielberg | ABC2 |
| 4 April | (United States) 2009 Kids' Choice Awards | Nickelodeon |
| 12 April | (United States) WWE Diva Diaries | Arena |
| 2 May | (United Kingdom) Glyndebourne Musical Month: 75th Birthday Season | BBC HD |
| 25 May | (United States) Shaun Cassidy Biography | Bio. |
| 8 June | 63rd Tony Awards | Bio. |
| 20 June | Barry Manilow Live From Las Vegas | Bio. |
| 26 June | Barry Manilow Songs from the 1970s | Bio. |
| 20 July | (United States) The Debbie Rowe Interview: The Missing Tapes | Arena |
| 27 July | (United States) Jacko Madness | Arena |
| September | (United States) 2009 MTV Video Music Awards | MTV |
| 21 September | (United States) 61st Primetime Emmy Awards | Arena |
| 21 September | (United States) 61st Primetime Emmy Awards | Network Ten |
| 6 November | (Germany) MTV Europe Music Awards 2009 | MTV |
| 7 November | (United States) 2009 Scream Awards | Sci Fi Channel |
| 12 November | (United States) 2009 CMA Awards | Country Music Channel |
| 23 November | (United States) 2009 American Music Awards | FOX8 |
| 13 December | (United States) VH1 Divas 2009 | MTV |
| 27 December | (United States) 2009: That Really Happened? | VH1 |
| 27 December | Bonnie Tyler's Top 50 1980s Power Ballads | VH1 |
| 31 December | (United Kingdom) Last Night of the Proms 2009 | UK.TV |
| | (United States) ~~20th GLAAD Media Awards~~ | Arena |

== Programming changes ==
=== Changes to network affiliation ===
This is a list of programs which made their premiere on an Australian television network that had previously premiered on another Australian television network. The networks involved in the switch of allegiances are predominantly both free-to-air networks or both subscription television networks. Programs that have their free-to-air/subscription television premiere, after previously premiering on the opposite platform (free-to air to subscription/subscription to free-to air) are not included. In some cases, programs may still air on the original television network. This occurs predominantly with programs shared between subscription television networks.

==== Domestic ====
| Program | New network | Previous network | Date |
|---|---|---|---|
| Thank God You're Here | Seven Network | Network Ten | 29 April 2009 |
| Football Stars of Tomorrow | Nine Network / Fox Sports | Fox Sports / SBS TV | 28 June 2009 |
| Flipper & Lopaka | ABC3 | Seven Network | 5 December 2009 |
| Spellbinder | ABC3 | Nine Network | 7 December 2009 |

==== International ====
| Program | New network | Previous network | Date |
|---|---|---|---|
| (United States) Terminator: The Sarah Connor Chronicles | FOX8 | Nine Network | March |
| (United States) Flight of the Conchords | SBS One | Network Ten | 8 June 2009 |
| (United Kingdom) Torchwood | ABC2 | Network Ten / Ten HD | 19 June 2009 |
| (United Kingdom) Little Britain | Nine Network | ABC1 | 30 June 2009 |
| (United States) Survivor | Go! | Nine Network | 11 August 2009 |
| (United States) The Bachelor | Go! | Nine Network | 11 August 2009 |
| (United States) The Bachelorette | Go! | Nine Network | 11 August 2009 |
| (Canada) / (France) Babar | ABC2 | ABC1 | 12 August 2009 |
| (United States) Dance Your Ass Off | Go! | Nine Network | 15 August 2009 |
| (United States) The Wire | Go! (series five) / ABC2 | ABC2 | 1 September 2009 |
| (United States) The Bad Girls Club | MTV | Arena | 16 September 2009 |
| (United Kingdom) Gavin & Stacey (Note: Gavin & Stacey was premiered by Seven in early 2009, From Series 2 onward UKTV had first-run rights, with ABC2 having rerun rights from 2010) | UKTV / BBC HD | Seven Network | 14 September |
| (United States) South Park | SBS One / Go! | SBS One | 4 October 2009 |
| (United States) Curb Your Enthusiasm | Go! | Nine Network | 4 October 2009 |
| (United States) Weeds | Go! | Nine Network | 4 October 2009 |
| (United States) Nip/Tuck | Go! | Nine Network | 5 October 2009 |
| (United Kingdom) Danger Mouse | 7TWO | ABC1 | 8 November 2009 |
| (United Kingdom) Avenger Penguins | 7TWO | ABC1 | 8 November 2009 |
| (United Kingdom) Count Duckula | 7TWO | ABC1 / Network Ten | 8 November 2009 |
| (United Kingdom) The Wind in the Willows | 7TWO | ABC1 | 8 November 2009 |
| (United Kingdom) Victor and Hugo: Bunglers in Crime | 7TWO | ABC1 | 29 November 2009 |
| (United States) Style By Jury | 7TWO | Seven Network | December 2009 |
| (United States) Malcolm in the Middle | Network Ten | Nine Network | 7 December 2009 |
| (United Kingdom) Wild at Heart | ABC2 | ABC1 | 19 December 2009 |
| (United States) Rita Rocks | Arena | W. Channel | 26 December 2009 |

| Date | Program | To | From |
|---|---|---|---|---|
| March | (United States) The Jerry Springer Show | Arena | FOX8 |
| 5 June | (United States) Charm School | MTV | VH1 |
| 19 August | (United States) Will & Grace | TV1 | 111 Hits |
| 6 September | (United States) Leverage | W. | FOX8 |
| 24 October | (United States) Celebrity Rehab with Dr. Drew | Arena | Bio. |
| 15 November | (Canada) Pelswick | KidsCo | Nickelodeon |
| 15 November | (Canada) / (France) Donkey Kong Country | KidsCo | Fox Kids |
| 15 November | (United States) Dress My Nest | Style Network | Arena |
| 15 November | (United Kingdom) Fat Dog Mendoza | KidsCo | Nickelodeon |
| 15 November | (United States) Dennis the Menace (1986) | KidsCo | Nickelodeon |
| 15 November | (United States) Married Away | Style Network | Arena |
| 15 November | (United States) Pantry Raid | Style Network | Lifestyle FOOD |
| 15 November | (United States) Split Ends | Style Network | Arena |
| 15 November | (United States) Style Her Famous | Style Network | Arena |
| 15 November | (United States) Whose Wedding Is It Anyway? | Style Network | Arena |
| 16 November | (Canada) Rolie Polie Olie | KidsCo | Disney Channel | https://web.archive.org/web/20030621215718/http://www.disney.com.au/DisneyChannel/playhouse/shows/roliepolieolie/schedule.html |
| 16 November | (United States) Instant Beauty Pageant | Style Network | Arena |
| 16 November | (United Kingdom) What Not to Wear | LifeStyle You | The LifeStyle Channel |
| 16 November | (United Kingdom) The House of Tiny Tearaways | LifeStyle You | The LifeStyle Channel |
| 20 November | (United Kingdom) Don't Tell the Bride | LifeStyle You | The LifeStyle Channel |
| 30 November | (United States) Two and a Half Men | Arena | FOX8 |
| 21 December | (United Kingdom) How to Look Good Naked | LifeStyle You | The LifeStyle Channel |

=== Free-to-air premieres ===
Below is a list programs which made their premiere on free-to-air television that had previously premiered on Australian Pay TV, a program may still air on the original network.

| Date | Program | FTA | Pay TV |
|---|---|---|---|
| 1 January | Secret Millionaire | Nine Network | The LifeStyle Channel |
| 12 January | Airtime! | Nine Network | Nickelodeon |
| 12 January | Killing Hitler | Seven Network | ? |
| 15 January | The Unteachables | ABC1 | UK.TV |
| 21 January | Chandon Pictures | ABC1 | Movie Extra |
| 8 February | Cranford | ABC1 | UK.TV |
| 9 February | Stephen Fry: The Secret Life of the Manic Depressive | ABC1 | ? |
| 22 February | E! True Hollywood Story: Heath Ledger | Network Ten | E! |
| 5 March | Pulling | ABC2 | UK.TV |
| 8 March | Infamous Assassinations | Seven Network | The History Channel |
| 17 March | Bridezillas | Nine Network | Arena |
| 16 April | Mad Men | SBS TV | Movie Extra |
| 10 June | Saved | Seven Network | ? |
| 5 August | Louis Theroux's Weird Weekends (Born Again Christians episode) | Seven Network | Arena |
| 15 August | iCarly (Shown during Toasted TV) | Network Ten | Nickelodeon Australia |
| 31 August | Entourage | SBS One | Arena |
| 13 September | Rock of Love | Network Ten | VH1 |
| 13 September | Little Britain USA | Network Ten | Showcase |
| 21 September (Syd/Bris); 25 September (Melb/Adel/Per) | The Andromeda Strain | Seven Network | Showcase |
| 28 September | Style By Jury | Seven Network | Arena / Discovery Home & Health |
| 5 October | Destroyed in Seconds | Seven Network | The Discovery Channel |
| 5 October | Man vs. Wild | SBS One | The Discovery Channel |
| 5 October | Afro Samurai | Go! | MTV |
| 17 October | Reno 911! | Go! | The Comedy Channel |
| 2 November | The Jay Leno Show | 7TWO | The Comedy Channel |
| 4 November | American Gladiators | 7TWO | MTV |
| 5 November | Fifth Gear | 7TWO | Discovery Turbo / The Lifestyle Channel |
| 15 November | False Witness | Nine Network | UK.TV / BBC HD |
| 30 November | Come Dine with Me | Seven Network | LifeStyle Food |
| 6 December | Inside the Actors Studio | ABC2 | Bio. |
| 6 December | John Adams | SBS One | Showcase |
| 6 December | Tool Academy | Go! | MTV |
| 9 December | Willie's Wonky Chocolate Factory | ABC2 | The LifeStyle Channel |
| 14 December | Stargate Universe | Network Ten | Sci-Fi Channel |

=== Subscription television premieres ===
This is a list programs which had their premiere on Australian subscription television that had previously premiered on free-to-air television. Programs may still air on the original network.

==== Domestic ====
Subscription television premieres on Australian television in 2009
| Program | Subscription network | Free-to-air network | Date | Ref |
|---|---|---|---|---|
| Backyard Blitz | The LifeStyle Channel | Nine Network | 23 March | |
| Packed to the Rafters | Hallmark Channel | Seven Network | 13 June 2009 | |
| Summer Heights High | The Comedy Channel | ABC TV | August 2009 | |
| The Chaser's War on Everything | The Comedy Channel | ABC TV | 3 December 2009 | |
| Rush | Hallmark Channel | Network Ten | December 2009 | |

==== International ====
International subscription television premieres on Australian television in 2009
| Program | Country of origin | Subscription network | Free-to-air network | Date | Ref |
|---|---|---|---|---|---|
| Psych | United States | TV1 | Network Ten, TEN HD | 3 January | |
| Roots | United States | FOX Classics | Network Ten | 19 January | |
| Star Wars: The Clone Wars | United States | Cartoon Network | Network Ten | 13 February | |
| Damages | United States | W. | Nine Network | 17 April | |
| Eliot Kid | United Kingdom | Disney Channel | ABC1 | 15 May | |
| It's Always Sunny in Philadelphia | United States | The Comedy Channel | Seven Network | 14 July | |
| Gavin & Stacey (Note: Gavin & Stacey was premiered by Seven in early 2009, From Series 2 onward UKTV had first-run rights, with ABC2 having FTA rerun rights from 2010) | United Kingdom | UKTV | Seven Network | 3 August | |
| Women's Murder Club | United States | W. | Network Ten | 8 September | |
| Batman: The Brave and the Bold | United States | Cartoon Network | Nine Network | 22 September | |
| Carnivàle | United States | Showcase | ABC TV | 20 November | |
| QI | United Kingdom | UKTV | ABC1 | 14 December | |
| The Gil Mayo Mysteries | United Kingdom | 13th Street | ABC1 | 16 December | |
| Life on Mars | United States | W. | Network Ten | 17 December | |

=== Ending this year ===
Domestic television series endings on Australian television in 2009
| Telemovie | Network | End date | Start date | Ref |
|---|---|---|---|---|
| Temptation | Nine Network | 23 January | 30 May 2005 | |
| McLeod's Daughters | Nine Network | 31 January | 8 August 2001 | |
| The All in Call | Seven Network | 1 March | 8 February | |
| Fresh | Nine Network | 13 March | 2000 | |
| Extra | Nine Network | 26 June | 9 February 1991 | |
| This Afternoon | Nine Network | 14 July | 29 June | |
| The Chaser's War on Everything | ABC1 | 29 July | 17 February 2006 | |
| The Cook and the Chef | ABC1 | 16 September | 8 February 2006 | |
| All Saints | Seven Network | 27 October | 24 February 1998 | |
| Rove | Network Ten | 15 November | 22 September 1999 | |
| The Einstein Factor | ABC1 | 22 November | 8 February 2004 | |
| Australian Idol | Network Ten | 22 November | 27 July 2003 | |
| The Great Outdoors | Seven Network | 15 August | 5 February 1993 | |
| The Spearman Experiment | Network Ten | 30 October | 8 September | |

=== Returning this year ===
| Date | Program | Channel | Debut |
|---|---|---|---|
| 20 April | Who Wants to Be a Millionaire? (returned under the title of Hot Seat) | Nine Network | 18 April 1999 |

== See also ==
- 2009 in Australia
- List of Australian films of 2009

== Notes ==
- ^{a} Co-production with the United States.
