= 2009 in Australia =

- Monarch: Elizabeth II
- Governor-General: Quentin Bryce
- Prime minister: Kevin Rudd
- Elections: QLD

The following lists events that happened during 2009 in Australia.

- Decades: 1980s; 1990s; 2000s; 2010s; 2020s
- See also: 2009 in Australian television; 2009 in Australian literature; Other events of 2009; Timeline of Australian history

== Incumbents ==
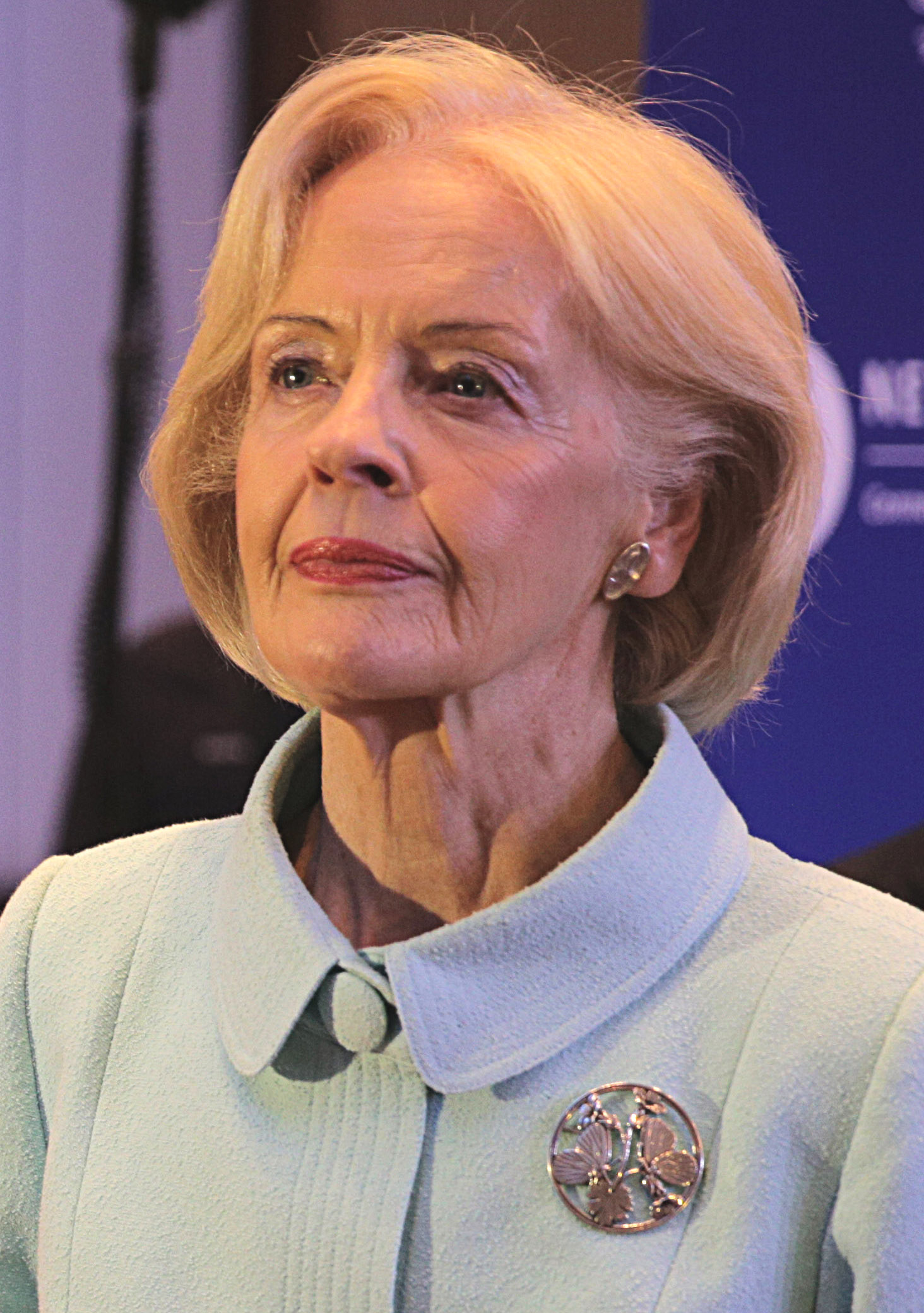
Quentin Bryce

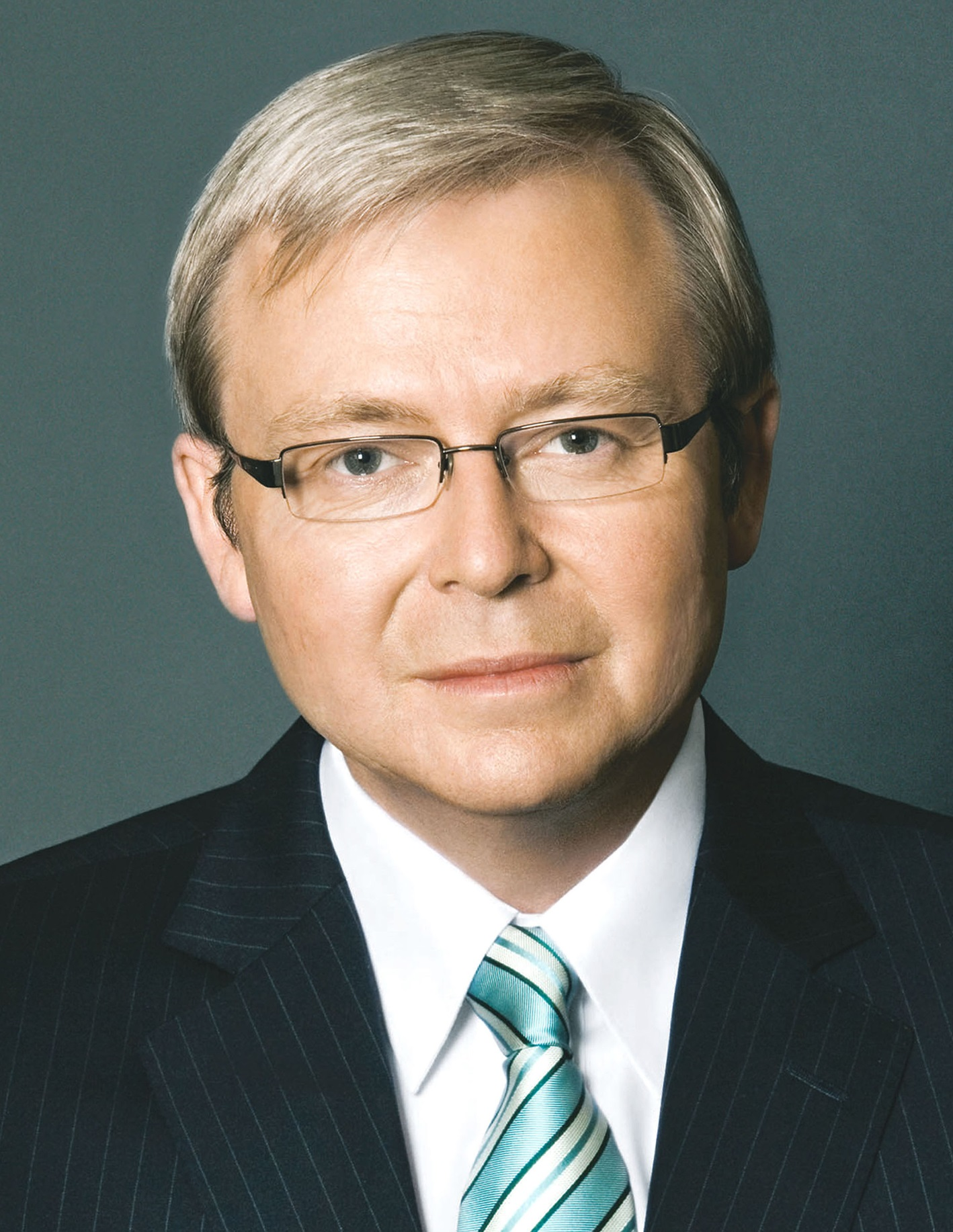
Kevin Rudd

- Monarch – Elizabeth II
- Governor-General – Quentin Bryce
- Prime Minister – Kevin Rudd
  - Deputy Prime Minister – Julia Gillard
  - Opposition Leader – Malcolm Turnbull (until 1 December), then Tony Abbott
- Chief Justice – Robert French

=== State and territory leaders ===
- Premier of New South Wales – Nathan Rees (until 4 December), then Kristina Keneally
  - Opposition Leader – Barry O'Farrell
- Premier of Queensland – Anna Bligh
  - Opposition Leader – Lawrence Springborg (until 2 April), then John-Paul Langbroek
- Premier of South Australia – Mike Rann
  - Opposition Leader – Martin Hamilton-Smith (until 8 July), then Isobel Redmond
- Premier of Tasmania – David Bartlett
  - Opposition Leader – Will Hodgman
- Premier of Victoria – John Brumby
  - Opposition Leader – Ted Baillieu
- Premier of Western Australia – Colin Barnett
  - Opposition Leader – Eric Ripper
- Chief Minister of the Australian Capital Territory – Jon Stanhope
  - Opposition Leader – Zed Seselja
- Chief Minister of the Northern Territory – Paul Henderson
  - Opposition Leader – Terry Mills
- Chief Minister of Norfolk Island – Andre Nobbs

=== Governors and administrators ===
- Governor of New South Wales – Marie Bashir
- Governor of Queensland – Penelope Wensley
- Governor of South Australia – Kevin Scarce
- Governor of Tasmania – Peter Underwood
- Governor of Victoria – David de Kretser
- Governor of Western Australia – Ken Michael
- Administrator of the Australian Indian Ocean Territories – Brian Lacy (from 5 October)
- Administrator of Norfolk Island – Owen Walsh
- Administrator of the Northern Territory – Tom Pauling

== Events ==
=== Whole year ===
- Year of the Blood Donor.

=== January ===
- 2 to 8 January – Violence strikes the Housing NSW estate in Rosemeadow. The estate is due to be demolished.
- 4 January – Torrential downpours in north western Queensland cause flooding in Cloncurry and Mount Isa.
- 16 January – Trooper Mark Donaldson is awarded the Victoria Cross for Australia for actions in Oruzgan province during Operation Slipper, the Australian contribution to the War in Afghanistan.
- 28 to 31 January – Southeastern Australia swelters in a 1 in 100-year heatwave.
- 29 January – Victoria Police arrest a Melbourne man for murder, after he allegedly throws his four-year-old daughter off the West Gate Bridge.

=== February ===
- 3 February – Justice Virginia Bell is sworn in as a puisne judge of the High Court of Australia, replacing Justice Michael Kirby who retired the previous day.
- 3 February – Prime Minister Kevin Rudd unveils a second economic stimulus package to the value of A$42 billion.
- 4 February – Heavy rain causes major flooding at Ingham in north Queensland.
- 7 February – Bushfires in Victoria kill 173 people in what are not only the nation's worst ever bushfires, surpassing the record set by Ash Wednesday in 1983. Also the nation's worst peacetime disaster since Cyclone Mahina in 1899.
- 13 February – The Federal Government's $42 billion economic stimulus package is passed in the Senate, paving the way for promised cash bonuses for workers around the country.
- 22 February – Australia observes a National Day of Mourning in remembrance of the 209 (later revised downwards to 173) people who perished in the Victorian bushfires.
- 25 February – Pacific Brands announces it is ceasing manufacturing operations in Australia, at a cost of 1,850 jobs.

=== March ===
- 4 March –
  - Cyclone Hamish, the first category 5 cyclone since Cyclone George in 2007, develops in the Coral Sea and moves southwards along the Queensland coast causing extensive damage to the Great Barrier Reef but does not make landfall. It eventually dissipates on 14 March.
  - Australia's economy slumps 0.5 per cent, its first quarter of negative growth in 8 years.
- 11 March – The cargo ship MV Pacific Adventurer leaks about 230,000 litres of fuel oil along 60 km of southern Queensland's coast after battling a cyclone.
- 14 March – The Victorian bushfires are officially declared contained.
- 20 March – Marcus Einfeld (former Superior Court judge) is sentenced to 3 years in jail for perjury relative to a speeding ticket.
- 20 March – Emirates Flight 407 was taking off from Melbourne Airport for a flight to Dubai and failed to become airborne in the normal distance. When the aircraft was approaching the end of the runway, the crew commanded nose-up sharply causing the tail to scrape along the runway as it became airborne.
- 21 March – A Sydney film crew claims to be 100% certain of the finding of Sir Charles Kingsford Smith's plane Lady Southern Cross in the Bay of Bengal.
- 21 March – Anna Bligh claims victory in the Queensland state election and becomes the country's first elected female Premier.
- 22 March – A member of the Hells Angels is killed in a clash between the Hell's Angels and Comanchero motorcycle gangs in the terminal at Sydney Airport.
- 31 March – Torrential rain around the mid-north New South Wales coast leaves thousands stranded and forces people from over 100 properties to evacuate in the Coffs Harbour area.

=== April ===
- 7 April – The Australian government announces that it has terminated the request for proposal for the National Broadband Network, and that the network will be built as a public private partnership.
- 16 April – An explosion on a boat carrying Afghan asylum seekers kills 5 and injures 34 off the coast of Western Australia.
- 16 April – Two adults and a child are killed when a V/Line bus rolls in Heathmere, Victoria.

=== May ===
- 9 May – The first case of swine flu in Australia is confirmed in Queensland.
- 11 May – The Australian Broadcasting Corporation television program Four Corners presents a report titled "Code of Silence" about alleged sexual misconduct by rugby league players, leading to a public debate on professional sportsman and group sex.
- 12 May – Treasurer Wayne Swan hands down the 2009 Australian federal budget.
- 16 May – A plebiscite on daylight saving in Western Australia following a three-year trial fails on a No vote of 54.56%. On the same day, a by-election in the Western Australian state seat of Fremantle produces a victory for Greens WA candidate Adele Carles.
- 21–22 May – Following 48 hours of torrential rain, Brisbane and other parts of South East Queensland and the Northern Rivers region of New South Wales are affected by major flooding, said to be the worst since the Brisbane River broke its bank in the 1974 Brisbane flood.

=== June ===
- 3 June – Australia avoids a recession after the Australian Bureau of Statistics reveals the economy for the March quarter grew by a 0.4 per cent from the final quarter of 2008.
- 4 June – Joel Fitzgibbon resigns as Minister for Defence after admitting to a breach of the Ministerial Code of Conduct.
- 15 June – Des Moran, a member of Melbourne's notorious Moran family and brother of Lewis Moran, is shot dead in Ascot Vale.
- 19 June – Australia's first swine flu-related fatality occurs when a 26-year-old West Australian man dies in Adelaide.
- 20 June - disappearance of Krystal Fraser – Unsolved 2009 disappearance of 23-year-old from Victoria

=== July ===
- 5 July – An Australian mining executive for the Rio Tinto Group, Stern Hu, is detained in Shanghai, China facing accusations of stealing state secrets.
- 14 July – The Minister for the Environment, Heritage and the Arts, Peter Garrett, announced that the Australian Government had approved the development of the Four Mile uranium mine in South Australia.
- 18 July – Five members of the Lin family are murdered in their North Epping home. A relative, Robert Xie, is arrested in 2011, and found guilty of the murders in 2017 after numerous retrials.
- 25 July – 108-year-old Perth man Claude Choules, who moved to Australia from Britain in 1926, becomes his birth nation's last known surviving World War I veteran on the death of 111-year-old Harry Patch in Somerset, England. Mr Choules, who was born in Worcestershire, England, joined the Royal Navy as a seaman in 1916.

=== August ===
- 4 August – Over 400 police and intelligence officers conduct a series of dawn raids in Melbourne, arresting members of an alleged Islamic terrorist cell who are suspected of plotting a suicide attack on Holsworthy Barracks in Sydney.
- 11 August – Nine Australians, including seven from Victoria and two from Queensland, are killed when their plane crashes into the side of a cliff face on their way to Kokoda, Papua New Guinea.
- 14 August – Paul Henderson's Labor government in the Northern Territory survives a motion of no-confidence following the resignation of Alison Anderson, after receiving support from independent politician Gerry Wood.
- 30 August – Victorian MP Tim Holding goes missing while on a solo hike on Mount Feathertop. Searchers find him alive and well two days later on 1 September.
- 31 August– New South Wales Minister for Health and Australian Labor Party leader in the Legislative Council, John Della Bosca, resigned his Ministerial and leadership positions following public revelation of an extra-marital affair.

=== September ===
- 23 September – Major dust storms hit Eastern Australia.

=== October ===
- 9 October – The world's largest tensegrity bridge, the Kurilpa Bridge is opened in Brisbane
- 15 October – A six-month-old baby survives when his pram rolls off the platform at Ashburton railway station, Melbourne and is struck by the approaching train.
- 18 October – Australian Customs vessel the MV Oceanic Viking rescues 78 asylum seekers – claiming to be Tamil refugees from the conflict in Sri Lanka – inside Indonesia's search and rescue zone. The migrants are taken to Bintan island in Indonesia however they refuse to disembark or co-operate with Indonesian customs officials.

=== November ===
- 11 November – Claude Choules becomes the world's oldest first-time author at the age of 108 when his autobiography The Last of the Last is published.
- 16 November – Kevin Rudd and Malcolm Turnbull apologise on behalf of Australia to the "Forgotten Australians": people who suffered neglect and abuse as children in state care, in particular, thousands of Home Children – British child migrants forcibly emigrated to Australia until the 1960s.

=== December ===
- 1 December – Tony Abbott becomes Leader of the Opposition after defeating Malcolm Turnbull in a ballot for the leadership of the Liberal Party of Australia.
- 4 December – Kristina Keneally is sworn in as the first female Premier of New South Wales after defeating Nathan Rees in a ballot for leadership of the Australian Labor Party in New South Wales the previous day.
- 5 December – By-elections are held for the electorates of Bradfield and Higgins. Both by-elections are won by the Liberal Party candidates: Paul Fletcher (Bradfield) and Kelly O'Dwyer (Higgins).

== Arts and literature ==
- 6 March – Guy Maestri wins the 2009 Archibald Prize for his portrait of indigenous musician Geoffrey Gurrumul Yunupingu.
- 18 June – Tim Winton wins his fourth Miles Franklin Award for the novel Breath.

== Science and technology ==
- 21 May – Researchers at Swinburne University of Technology announce the development of an optical disc technology capable of holding 10,000 times as much data as a DVD.

== Film ==
- 6 April – The world premiere of Star Trek is held at the Sydney Opera House.

== Television ==
- 10 January – Peter Overton takes over as the anchorman of Sydney's 6pm Nine News on weeknights after Mark Ferguson is suspended indefinitely after poor ratings, losing to Seven News.
- 7–14 February – All three commercial networks in Australia take extensive news coverage of the 2009 Victorian Bushfires, in which 181 people lost their lives, including former Nine newsreader Brian Naylor and actor Reg Evans.
- 9 February – The premiere of Underbelly: A Tale of Two Cities sets the ratings record of the highest-rating Australian television series launch since the introduction of the OzTAM people meter system in 2001. The launch attracted 2.58 million viewers, and is also the highest rating non-sporting program in television history.
- 26 March – One HD launches.
- 26 April – Talia Fowler wins the second season of So You Think You Can Dance Australia.
- 3 May – Rebecca Gibney wins the Gold Logie Award for the Most Popular Personality on Australian Television at the 2009 Logie Awards.
- 12 May – The ABC receives an extra $136.4 million over three years from the 2009 federal budget to develop an advertising-free digital children's channel (ABC3), and increase its production of local drama to 90 hours a year, a similar level to the amount required by the commercial networks. The budget also allocated SBS an extra $20 million over the same period to produce up to 50 hours of new Australian content each year. This figure is significantly below the extra $70 million SBS were seeking per year.
- 13 May – Former rugby league footballer and The NRL Footy Show presenter, Matthew Johns, is suspended indefinitely from the program by the Nine Network following reports of his involvement in a group sex act with other Cronulla-Sutherland Sharks players in 2002. The incident was first reported on ABC1's current affairs program, Four Corners, on 11 May 2009.
- 3 June – A skit involving terminally ill children and the fictional 'Make a Realistic Wish Foundation' (a parody of the Make-a-Wish Foundation) causes public outrage after airing on an episode of The Chaser's War on Everything on ABC1. The skit involved The Chaser members Chris Taylor (as the foundation spokesperson) and Andrew Hansen (as a doctor). The premise of the skit was that if the terminally ill children are only going to live for a few more months before dying, it is not worth spending money on lavish gifts for them. It portrayed the children requesting extravagant items such as a trip to Disneyland and the chance to meet Zac Efron, with Taylor and Hansen instead giving them a pencil case and a stick respectively. The skit concluded with Taylor stating "Why go to any trouble, when they're only gonna die anyway". Following public criticism of the skit, both The Chaser and the Australian Broadcasting Corporation issued statements of apology. The ABC subsequently suspended the series for two weeks following the controversy. The series returned on 24 June.
- 8 June – Gordon Ramsay called Tracy Grimshaw a "pig" in an interview for A Current Affair.
- 10 June – The Nine Network announces the third series of Underbelly will be titled Underbelly: The Golden Mile, and will focus on Kings Cross in Sydney, beginning in 1989, and also include the Wood Royal Commission into police corruption.
- 19 July – Julie Goodwin wins the first series of MasterChef Australia, beating Poh Ling Yeow.
- 9 August – The Nine Network launches a new free-to-air digital channel named Go!, with the expansion of programing launched on 4 October.
- 7 October – The Jackson Jive, one of the acts in the Red Faces segment in the second of two Hey Hey It's Saturday reunion specials, causes international outrage when they appear in blackface parodying the Jackson Five.
- 1 November – The Seven Network launches a new free-to-air digital channel named 7Two.
- 22 November – Stan Walker wins the grand final of Australian Idol 2009.
- 4 December – The Australian Broadcasting Corporation launches ABC3, a digital television channel aimed at children.

== Sport ==
- 7 January – Australia defeats South Africa by 103 runs in the third Test at the Sydney Cricket Ground.
- 11 January – Australia defeats South Africa by 52 runs in the first Twenty20 at the Melbourne Cricket Ground.
- 25 January – Melbourne Victory wins the premiership of the A-League 2008–09 season, beating Adelaide United on goals scored, after the two teams were tied on points and goal difference.
- 31 January – Serena Williams wins the women's singles title at the 2009 Australian Open, defeating Dinara Safina (6–0, 6–3).
- 2 February – Rafael Nadal wins the men's singles title at the 2009 Australian Open, defeating Roger Federer in five sets (7–5, 3–6, 7–6(3), 3–6, 6–2).
- 3 February – Cricketers Ricky Ponting and Michael Clarke are named joint winners of the Allan Border Medal.
- 28 February – Melbourne Victory wins the championship of the A-League 2008–09 season, defeating Adelaide United 1–0 in the Grand Final at Telstra Dome.
- 1 March – Noriyuki Haga and Ben Spies win the two races of the Australian Superbike Grand Prix held at the Phillip Island Grand Prix Circuit.
- 1 March – 2008 NRL premiers the Manly-Warringah Sea Eagles defeat Super League XIII champions the Leeds Rhinos 28–20 in the 2009 World Club Challenge.
- 14 March – Hazem El Masri of the Bulldogs becomes the highest point scorer in the NRL, surpassing Andrew Johns.
- 29 March – British driver Jenson Button wins from pole position at the 2009 Australian Grand Prix.
- 7 May – Racing Victoria suspends jumps racing in Victoria following the deaths of three horses over two days at a racing carnival in Warrnambool.
- 7 June – The Socceroos draw (0–0) against Qatar in an away match at Doha, qualifying for the 2010 FIFA World Cup in South Africa.
- 30 June – Hazem El Masri announces his retirement from the NRL, taking effect at the end of the 2009 season.
- 11 July – Fremantle kick only 1.7 (13) against Adelaide at Football Park. This constitutes:
1. the first score of fewer than three goals since 1991
2. the lowest AFL/VFL score since Richmond kicked 0.8 (8) against St Kilda in 1961
- 12 July – Mark Webber wins his first Formula One Grand Prix at the 2009 German Grand Prix in his eighth year in Formula One. He was the first Australian to win a Grand Prix since 1981. Webber also set a new record for most Formula One race starts prior to his first win, at 130.
- 31 July – Ricky Ponting became the highest Australian aggregate run-scorer in Test cricket, surpassing Allan Border's total of 11,174 during the third Test of the 2009 Ashes at Lord's Cricket Ground in London.
- 23 August – The Australian cricket team loses The Ashes cricket series, 2 Tests to 1 in England. Australia drop from the first-ranked Test team to behind South Africa, Sri Lanka and India.
- 6 September – Finnish driver Mikko Hirvonen and his co-driver Jarmo Lehtinen driving a Ford Focus win Rally Australia, the first to be held at its new venue on the northern coast of New South Wales.
- 6 September – The St. George Illawarra Dragons win the minor premiership following the final main round of the 2009 NRL season. The win is their first as a merged club and the Dragons' first since 1985. The Sydney Roosters finish in last position, claiming their first wooden spoon since 1966.
- 21 September – Gary Ablett, Jr. of the Geelong Football Club wins the 2009 Brownlow Medal.
- 26 September – Geelong wins the 2009 AFL Grand Final, beating St Kilda 12.8 (80) to 9.14 (68).
- 4 October – The Melbourne Storm become premiers of the National Rugby League season 2009, defeating the Parramatta Eels 23–16 at ANZ Stadium, although they would be subsequently stripped of this award, leaving the position of premiership winners vacant.
- 11 October – Garth Tander and Will Davison win the 2009 Bathurst 1000 for the Holden Racing Team, finishing just 0.8 seconds ahead of Brad Jones Racing pairing of Jason Richards and Cameron McConville. It was Tander's second win at the Bathurst 1000, Davison's first and HRT's sixth.
- 24 October – So You Think ridden by Glen Boss wins the Cox Plate at Moonee Valley.
- 3 November – Shocking wins the 2009 Melbourne Cup.
- 21 December – Television ratings show that rugby league was the most watched sport on Australian television in 2009.
- 28 December – Alfa Romeo II takes line honours in the 2009 Sydney to Hobart Yacht Race.

== Births ==
- 25 May - Jariyah Shah, Vietnamese footballer
- 27 July - Zubayr Rafiz, Malaysian footballer

== Deaths ==
- 3 January – John Grindrod, 89, Anglican Primate of Australia (1982–1989) and Archbishop of Brisbane (1980–1989)
- 8 January – Deborah Riedel, 50, operatic soprano
- 13 January – Nancy-Bird Walton, 93, aviation pioneer
- 18 January – Luke Borusiewicz, 2, murder victim (born 2006)
- 21 January – Ernie Bourne, 82, actor
- 21 January – Pat Crawford, 75, Test cricketer
- 31 January – Sir John Fuller, 91, NSW government minister
- 1 February – Anna Donald, 42, epidemiologist
- 1 February – Peter Howson, 89, politician
- 7 February – Reg Evans, 80, actor
- 7 February – Brian Naylor, 78, newsreader
- 8 February – Neil McNeill, 87, politician
- 11 February – Penny Ramsey, actress
- 13 February – Julius Patching, 92, Olympic administrator
- 19 February – Colin Rattray, 77, Tasmanian politician
- 20 February – Fine Cotton, 31, racehorse
- 23 February – Frank Gallacher, 65, actor
- 23 March – Peter Wherrett, 72, motoring journalist
- 24 March – Laurie Short, 93, trade union leader
- 1 April – Margreta Elkins, 78, mezzo-soprano opera singer
- 5 April – George Tribe, 88, Test cricketer
- 6 April – Shawn Mackay, 26, rugby union footballer (died in South Africa)
- 7 April – Jobie Dajka, 27, track cyclist
- 8 April – James Allen Keast, 86, ornithologist (died in Canada)
- 11 April – Rob Dickson, 45, film-maker and Australian rules footballer (died in South Africa)
- 13 April – John Armitage, 88, politician
- 13 April – Frank Costigan, 78, lawyer and royal commissioner
- 14 April – Max Lake, 84, winemaker and surgeon
- 14 April – Sir Marcus Loane, 97, Anglican Archbishop of Sydney, Primate of Australia
- 24 April – Michael Parsons, 48, Australian rules footballer
- 28 April – Richard Pratt, 74, businessman
- 1 May – George Hannan, 98, politician
- 1 May – Sunline, 13, racehorse
- 13 May – Don Cordner, 87, Australian rules footballer
- 15 May – Bud Tingwell, 86, actor
- 17 May – Dame Patricia Mackinnon, 97, President of the Royal Children's Hospital, Melbourne
- 18 May – Jerzy Zubrzycki, 89, sociologist
- 20 May – Paul Vinar, 69, Australian rules footballer
- 27 May – William Refshauge, 96, soldier and public health administrator
- 4 June – Chris O'Brien, 57, oncologist and surgeon
- 19 June – Stan Sismey, 92, cricketer
- 3 July – Victor Smorgon, 96, industrialist
- 3 July – Frank Devine, 77, newspaper editor
- 8 July – Edward Kenna, 90, recipient of the Victoria Cross
- 11 July – Robert 'Dolly' Dunn, 68(?), convicted sex offender
- 6 August – Sam, koala made famous in the 2009 Black Saturday bushfires
- 7 August – John Harber Phillips, 75, Chief Justice of Victoria (1991–2003)
- 21 August – Dean Turner, 37, bass player in rock group Magic Dirt.
- 29 August – Frank Gardner, 78, racing driver and driving safety advocate
- 8 September – Ray Barrett, 82, actor
- 14 September – Mike Leyland, 68, one of the Leyland Brothers
- 17 September – Virginia Chadwick, 64, politician
- 20 September – Ken Hough, 80, Australian-born New Zealand cricket and football international
- 22 September – Bruce McPhee, 82, racing driver and Bathurst winner
- 27 September – John Youl, 77, racing driver and prominent grazier
- 2 October – Jack Evans, 80, former Senator
- 6 October – Jimmy Bates, 99, oldest living VFL/AFL footballer (Essendon)
- 8 October – Gordon Boyd, 86, television personality
- 13 October – Leo Williams, 68, rugby union official
- 14 October – Fred Cress, 71, artist
- 22 October – Don Lane, 75, television presenter and entertainer
- 22 October – Paul Andrews, 53, West Australian politician
- 27 October – Alex Harris, 34, paralympic swimmer
- 9 November – Clen Denning, 98, oldest living VFL/AFL footballer (Carlton, Fitzroy)
- 16 November – Jack Wong Sue, 84, RAAF officer and war hero
- 19 November – Pat Mackie, 95, miner and trade unionist
- 23 November – Richard Meale, 77, composer
- 30 November – Brent Green, 33, Australian rules footballer
- 13 December – Mervyn Lee, 89, politician
- 14 December – Jack Denham, 85, horse trainer
- 22 December – Mick Cocks, rock guitarist (Rose Tattoo)
- 30 December – Rowland S. Howard, musician (The Birthday Party)

== See also ==
- 2009 in Australian literature
- 2009 in Australian television
- 2009 in Australian subscription television
- 2009 in Australian FTA television
- List of Australian films of 2009
