= Department of Communities =

Department of Communities or Department of Community may refer to:

- Department for Communities, a devolved government department of the Northern Ireland Executive
- Department of Communities (Western Australia), a department of the Western Australian Government
- Department of Communities, Child Safety and Disability Services, a department of the Queensland Government, Australia
- Department of Rural and Community Development and the Gaeltacht, department of the Irish government
- Department of Community, Culture and Leisure (Isle of Man), a now defunct department of the Isle of Man government
- Department of Community Services and Health, a now defunct department of the Australian government
