= Leyland Brothers World =

Theme park in New South Wales, Australia

- Interactive map of Leyland Brothers World
- Coordinates: 32°36′55″S 152°04′48″E
- Status: Defunct
- Opened: November 1990; 35 years ago
- Closed: 1992; 34 years ago
- Owner: Leyland brothers
- Attendance: 400,000 (1992)
- Area: 40 ha (99 acres)

Leyland Brothers World was an Australian theme park at North Arm Cove on the Mid North Coast of New South Wales. It opened in 1990 and closed in 1992. Sold to new owners later that same year, as of 2026 the park continues to operate as the Great Aussie Bush Camp.

== History ==
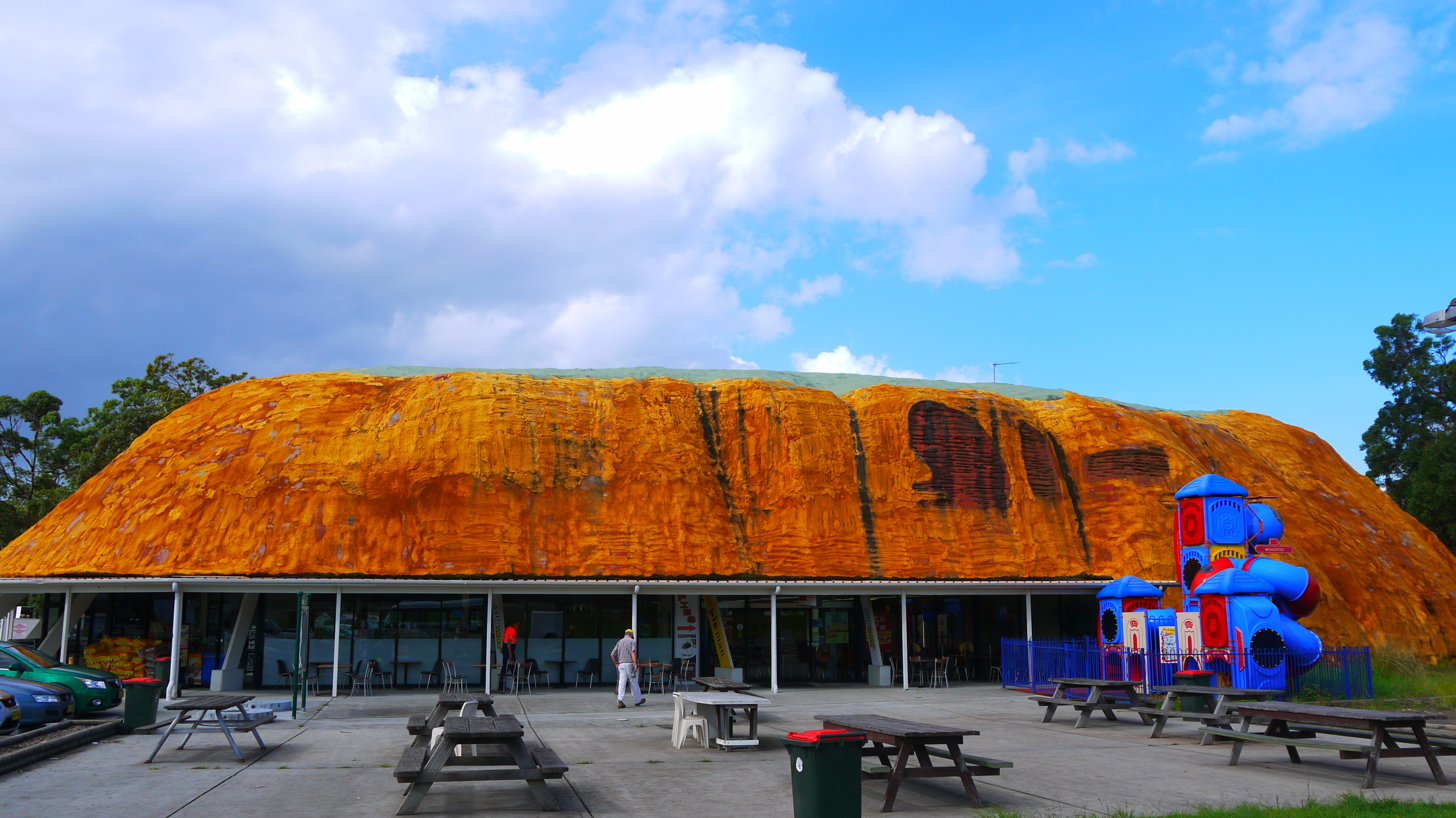
The Uluru replica and the Rock Roadhouse in May 2014, when it was being used as a United Petroleum petrol station and fast food centre, prior to its destruction by fire in 2018.

In November 1990, Leyland Brothers World was opened by Mal and Mike Leyland, documentary film-makers, who had gained fame with their films about their travels in the Australian outback, as well as the television series Ask the Leyland Brothers. The Leylands had sought to diversify their business interests by leveraging their name in the hospitality and tourism sector.

The park was set on a 40-hectare property on the Pacific Highway at North Arm Cove on the Mid North Coast of New South Wales. It included a 1/40 scale replica of Uluru, as well as amusement rides, a playground, a roadhouse, museum, a 1.8km 610mm-gauge circular railway, and a bush camp with a capacity to host 144 guests.

While it was open, the park had an estimated annual attendance of about 400,000 people, with 10,000 students attending the bush camp. Despite that, in July 1992, BDO Nelson was appointed receiver and manager of the park after the Leyland brothers failed to meet their loan commitments to the Commonwealth Bank. In a 1997 article in the Sunday Age, Mike Leyland said that the initial $1 million loan had blown out due to rain during construction, and was further compounded by the 27% interest rate. The failure of the park left the brothers bankrupt and led to a personal and professional rift between them that dissolved their 31 year film-making partnership. In 2015, Mal Leyland told the ABC TV program Australian Story that, "in hindsight Leyland Brothers World was a huge mistake, the biggest mistake we ever made."

The theme park was sold to new owners by the receiver for $800,000 in November 1992 and, as of 2026, continues to operate as the Great Aussie Bush Camp. The roadhouse and Uluru replica were destroyed by fire on 31 July 2018.

In early 2023, the new owners of the Rock Roadhouse reopened with fuel facilities, a convenience shop and new amenities.
