= 2006 in Australia =

- Monarch: Elizabeth II
- Governor-General: Michael Jeffery
- Prime minister: John Howard
- Elections: SA, TAS, QLD, VIC

The following lists events that happened during 2006 in Australia.

- Decades: 1980s; 1990s; 2000s; 2010s; 2020s
- See also: 2006 in Australian television; 2006 in Australian literature; Other events of 2006; Timeline of Australian history

== Incumbents ==
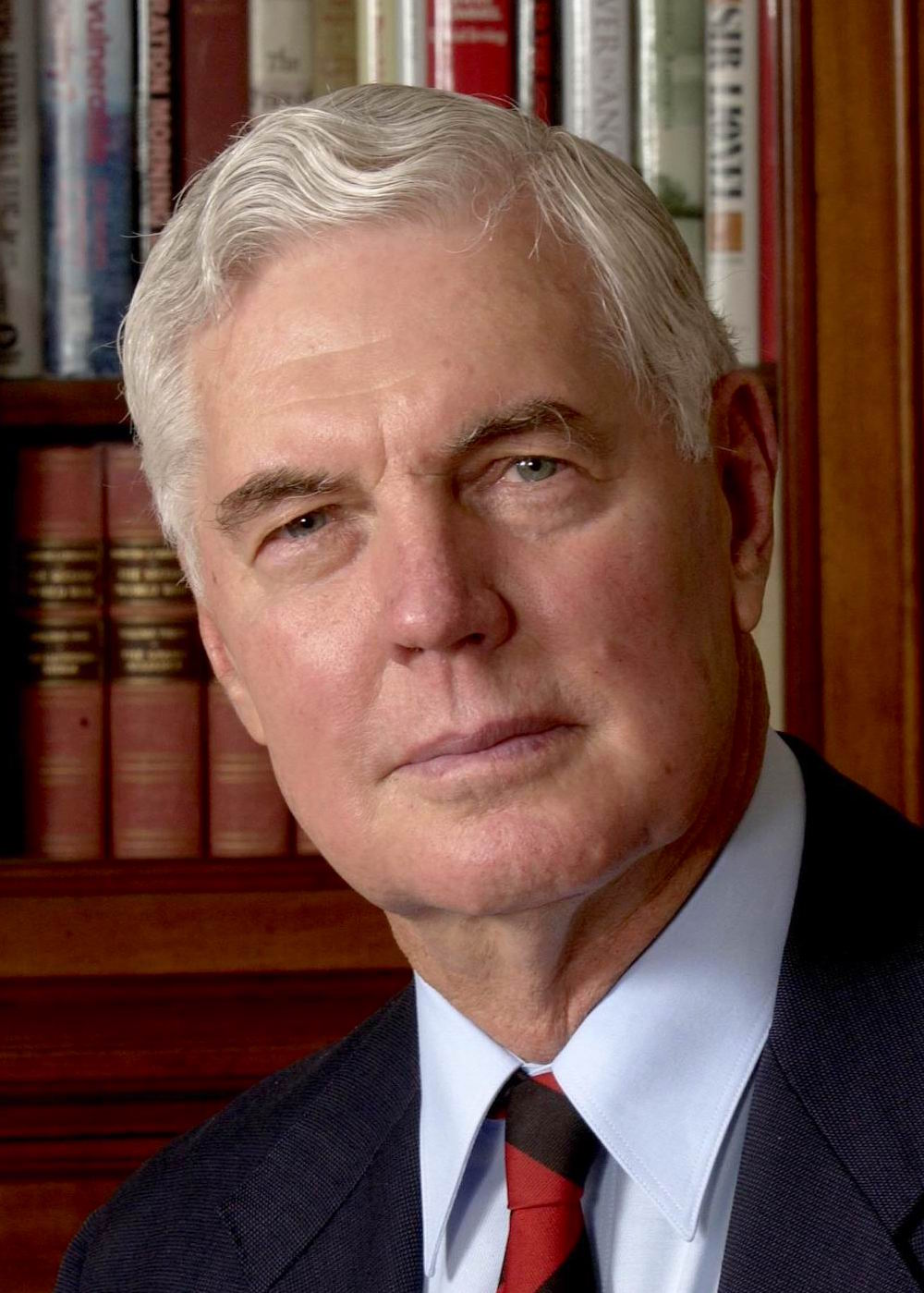
Michael Jeffery

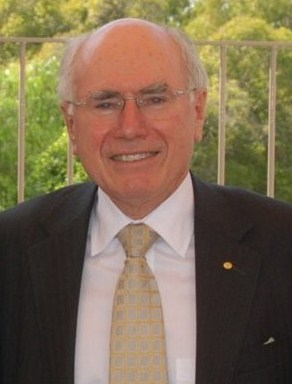
John Howard

- Monarch – Elizabeth II
- Governor-General – Michael Jeffery
- Prime Minister – John Howard
  - Deputy Prime Minister – Mark Vaile
  - Opposition Leader – Kim Beazley (until 4 December), then Kevin Rudd
- Chief Justice – Murray Gleeson

=== State and territory leaders ===
- Premier of New South Wales – Morris Iemma
  - Opposition Leader – Peter Debnam
- Premier of Queensland – Peter Beattie
  - Opposition Leader – Lawrence Springborg (until 18 September), then Jeff Seeney
- Premier of South Australia – Mike Rann
  - Opposition Leader – Rob Kerin (until 18 March), then Iain Evans
- Premier of Tasmania – Paul Lennon
  - Opposition Leader – Rene Hidding (until 30 March), then Will Hodgman
- Premier of Victoria – Steve Bracks
  - Opposition Leader – Robert Doyle (until 8 May), then Ted Baillieu
- Premier of Western Australia – Geoff Gallop (until 16 January), then Alan Carpenter
  - Opposition Leader – Matt Birney (until 24 March), then Paul Omodei
- Chief Minister of the Australian Capital Territory – Jon Stanhope
  - Opposition Leader – Brendan Smyth (until 16 May), then Bill Stefaniak
- Chief Minister of the Northern Territory – Clare Martin
  - Opposition Leader – Jodeen Carney
- Chief Minister of Norfolk Island – Geoffrey Gardner (until 1 June), then David Buffett

=== Governors and administrators ===
- Governor of New South Wales – Marie Bashir
- Governor of Queensland – Quentin Bryce
- Governor of South Australia – Marjorie Jackson-Nelson
- Governor of Tasmania – William Cox
- Governor of Victoria – John Landy (until 7 April), then David de Kretser
- Governor of Western Australia – Ken Michael (from 18 January)
- Administrator of the Australian Indian Ocean Territories – Neil Lucas (from 30 January)
- Administrator of Norfolk Island – Grant Tambling
- Administrator of the Northern Territory – Ted Egan

== Events ==
=== January ===
- 1 January – Bushfires grip parts of the Central Coast and the Riverina in New South Wales and the Wimmera in Victoria after one of the hottest New Years Days on record, with the Sydney central business district reaching 45 °C (113 °F).
- 2 January – A skydiving plane crash near Willowbank in Queensland claims five lives.
- 9 January – Communities in the Pilbara region of Western Australia are evacuated due to Cyclone Clare.
- 10 January – Six Australians die when a bus flips over in Egypt.
- 16 January – Premier of Western Australia Geoff Gallop resigns, citing clinical depression as the reason.
- 22–29 January – Bushfires affect several towns in Victoria, Western Australia, South Australia and Tasmania. Three volunteer firefighters are killed.
- 24 January – Alan Carpenter replaces Gallop as Premier of Western Australia.

=== February ===
- 18 February – Six teenagers are killed and another is injured in a hit and run accident in Cardross, Victoria, near Mildura.

=== March ===
- 5 March - Sydney FC win the inaugural A-League Grand Final, beating Central Coast Mariners 1–0.
- 18 March – South Australia and Tasmania vote in parliamentary state elections. Both the Mike Rann and Paul Lennon governments are re-elected.
- 20 March – Tropical Cyclone Larry strikes Innisfail and Cairns in Far North Queensland. Despite hundreds of millions of dollars in damage, no-one is killed.
- 23 March – Microsoft releases the Xbox 360 games console in Australia.
- 27 March – The WorkChoices industrial relations reforms come into effect.

=== April ===
- 7 April – John Landy retires as Governor of Victoria, and is succeeded by David de Kretser.
- 18 April – More than 19 Australian Federal Police officers are injured as the capital of the Solomon Islands, Honiara, erupts into rioting. In response to this, the Prime Minister of Australia John Howard orders an Army deployment of 220 troops.
- 21 April – Private Jacob Kovco becomes the first casualty of Australia's involvement in the Iraq campaign. The reason given initially was that his gun had accidentally discharged while cleaning his gun, although this was later retracted. It was later stated that he had accidentally shot himself while skylarking with his pistol.
- 25 April – A small earthquake causes a rock fall in a gold mine in Beaconsfield, Tasmania. Eleven miners come out, but three are left inside. One of them is found dead on 28 April. The other two are freed on 9 May.
- 26 April – The body of Bosnian civilian contractor Juso Sinanovic is taken to Australia instead of the body of Private Kovco. Private Kovco's body later arrived in Australia on 29 April.

=== May ===
- 16 May – Bill Stefaniak topples Brendan Smyth as leader of the ACT Liberal Party.
- 25 May – Australian troops are redeployed to East Timor after fresh outbreaks of violence.

=== June ===
- 2 June – The A$1.4 billion sale of the Myer department store chain to Newbridge Capital and the Myer family is completed.
- 12 June - Australia's national football team, the Socceroos, play their first FIFA World Cup match in 32 years against Japan. The match ended in a historic 3–1 victory to Australia, courtesy of late comeback goals by Tim Cahill and John Aloisi. The match is considered one of Australia's finest sporting achievements, and was responsible for the emergence of the Australia-Japan football rivalry.
- 18 June - Brazil beats Australia 2–0 in Munich.
- 22 June - Australia drew with Croatia 2–2 in Stuttgart to progress to the Round of 16 for the first time in their World Cup history.
- 26 June - Australia's FIFA World Cup campaign ended with a 1–0 lost to Italy in Kaiserslautern thanks to a controversial Totti penalty-kick.

=== July ===
- 9 July – Revelations are published in News Limited newspapers that, in 1994, John Howard made a secret deal with Peter Costello to hand over the leadership of the Liberal Party to him after having served two terms in office as Prime Minister.
- 17 July - Australia's largest recorded inundation caused by a tsunami hits the Western Australian coast at Steep Point.
- 29 July – In the face of a worsening water supply crisis, a referendum is held in Toowoomba, Queensland, Australia's second largest inland city, on the issue of using water recycled from the city's sewerage as a source of drinking water. The acrimonious campaign and emotional debate were watched closely nationwide as most other Australian cities raise water restrictions in the face of record low dam and river levels.

=== August ===
- 8 August – 2006 census night.

=== September ===
- 4 September – Steve Irwin dies in an accident when he is struck in the heart by a stingray barb off Queensland's coast.
- 8 September – Peter Brock is killed in a smash when his rally car skids off a bend and hits a tree.
- 9 September – Peter Beattie is re-elected Queensland premier at an early state election.
- 26 September – Seven people are killed in a horror road smash outside the Victoria town of Donald.

=== October ===
- After some of the hottest October days on record, bushfires ravage parts of New South Wales, Victoria and Tasmania.
- 18 October – Linda Lavarch resigns as Queensland's Attorney-General to seek treatment for depression, after it is revealed she refused a deal to return Jayant Patel (dubbed "Dr Death" by the media) to Australia to face criminal charges.
- 20 October – Rupert Murdoch's News Corporation company buys a 7.5 per cent stake in its main competitor, John Fairfax Holdings (publisher of the Sydney Morning Herald, The Age and the Australian Financial Review).
- 25 October – New South Wales Police minister Carl Scully is sacked after it is shown that he had misled parliament on two occasions about the 2005 Cronulla riots.
- 25 October – Comments that Sheikh Taj El-Din Hilaly made about women who dressed immodestly being responsible for rape are made public in The Australian. The sheik is forced to retract such comments on 26 October.

=== November ===
- 11 November – Belinda Emmett, a TV personality and wife of Rove McManus, dies, after a battle with breast cancer.
- 22 November – Sydney is covered in smoke after raging fires in the Blue Mountains.
- 25 November – Steve Bracks is re-elected Victorian premier at the state election.
- 29 November – One SAS soldier and the helicopter captain are dead and eight more rescued when a Blackhawk helicopter hits the deck of HMAS Kanimbla and crashes into waters off the coast of Fiji.
- 30 November – Greg Page, the founding member and lead singer of Australia's famous children's band The Wiggles, announced his retirement due to orthostatic intolerance. He handed his yellow skivvy to Sam Moran.

=== December ===
- 4 December – Kevin Rudd and Julia Gillard successfully challenge Kim Beazley and Jenny Macklin in a caucus ballot for leadership and deputy leadership of the Australian Labor Party.
- 18 December – 16-year-old girl Stacey Mitchell is murdered by lesbian couple Jessica Stasinowsky and Valerie Parashumti. She was bludgeoned with a concrete block and strangled with a chain, with her corpse found in a wheelie bin.
- The Gippsland region of Victoria and Eastern Tasmania come under threat as a result of bushfires.

=== Non-specific dates ===
- Investigation into AWB Limited's role in the Oil-for-Food Programme, sometimes referred to as Wheatgate or Oil for wheat. The official inquiry states that AWB directors did know about the kickback payments as early as 2001 and that government ministers did not know about the kickbacks, although this was not in their brief.

== Arts and literature ==
- 22 June – Roger McDonald wins the Miles Franklin Award for The Ballad of Desmond Kale.
- Gregory Day is awarded the Australian Literature Society Gold Medal for The Patron Saint of Eels.
- Kate Grenville's novel The Secret River wins the Christina Stead Prize for fiction.
- Peter Carey's novel Theft: A Love Story wins the Vance Palmer Prize for Fiction.

== Film ==
- Ten Canoes, the first full-length feature film made entirely in an Australian Aboriginal language, wins a special jury prize at the 2006 Cannes Film Festival.
- Happy Feet becomes the country's biggest earning film

== Television ==
- 1 January – Mildura Digital Television, a joint venture between WIN Television Mildura & Prime Television, goes on air in the Mildura area of Victoria as a Network Ten digital-only affiliate.
- 2 January – The Seven and Ten Networks outbid Channel Nine and win the rights to broadcast the AFL from 2007 to 2011 for a record $780 million. Also around this time, Seven announce that they have won the rights to broadcast the V8 Supercars from 2007 to 2014.
- 30 January – Channel Nine launches a new logo, dropping the famous dots and replacing it with a stand-alone nine in a blue box.
- February 2006 – Wheel of Fortune returns and starts in 2006. Larry Emdur & Laura Csortan will definitely host WOF in a partnership instead of one. On the very first episode in 2006, the car was won! The final edition of the version was screened on 28 July.
- 9 February – It is announced that Eddie McGuire will become Channel Nine's new CEO.
- 13 February – Network Ten's motto, Seriously... becomes Seriously Ten (this was Network Ten's 2001 motto), and has its new look Ten Watermark on the bottom right of the TV screens
- 17 February – ABC premiered The Chaser's War on Everything
- 20 February – Television Sydney formally launches after three months of testing, giving Sydney community television for the first time in almost two years.
- 21 May – Brant Webb & Todd Russell speak to A Current Affair's new host Tracy Grimshaw about their time underground in Beaconsfield in a 2-hour special called The Great Escape. They are paid a reported $2.6 million by Channel Nine for the right to talk to them.
- 4 June – After 12 years & a record-breaking 510 episodes, the last episode of the Seven Network show Blue Heelers goes to air.
- 14 September – Today Tonight host Naomi Robson is deported from Indonesia after doing a story on a West Papuan boy called Wa Wa who, supposedly, was going to be eaten by cannibals. This sparks a war of words between Seven & Nine, who ran the original story on Wa Wa in May on 60 Minutes. Naomi presents her final edition of Today Tonight on 1 December.
- 16 September – Television in Australia turns 50. The next day, this is commemorated with a live TV special from Star City, Sydney on the Seven Network.
- 29 September – Backyard Blitz finishes its 6-year run on the Nine Network. Jamie Durie leaves Nine and signs up with the Seven Network, the next year, he dances his way on Dancing with the Stars.
- 30 September – The Fox Footy Channel ceases broadcasting. It is replaced by Fox Sports 3 & Fox Sports News on 1 October.
- 18 October – PBL announces the sale of 50% of the Nine Network, including its 50% stake in ninemsn & ACP to CVC Asia Pacific for $4.5 billion.
- 26 November – Irishman Damien Leith defeats 17-year-old Jessica Mauboy to win the title of Australian Idol 2006 at the Sydney Opera House.
- 27 November – The last ever episode of The Glass House goes to air on ABC TV.
- 10 December – Network Ten broadcasts the V8 Supercars for the final-ever time, before handing the television right to the Seven Network. Ten later revived the V8 Supercars coverage 9 years later.

== Sport ==
- 1 January – Football Federation Australia officially becomes a member of the Asian Football Confederation.
- 2 February – First day of the Australian Track & Field Championships for the 2005–2006 season, which are held at the Sydney Olympic Park in Homebush Bay. The relays were conducted at the Melbourne Cricket Ground on 19 February 2006.
- 3 February – The 2006 World Club Challenge is held in Huddersfield, England. 2005 NRL premiers the Wests Tigers are defeated by RFL champions the Bradford Bulls 30–10.
- 16 February – Dale Begg-Smith wins Winter Olympic gold in the men's moguls at the 2006 Winter Olympics in Turin.
- 23 February – Alisa Camplin adds to her gold in Salt Lake City with a bronze in the women's aerials.
- 28 February – Melbourne Tigers defeat Sydney Kings 88–83 in Game 3 of a series sweep in the NBL Grand Final series.
- 5 March – Sydney FC defeats the Central Coast Mariners 1–0 to win the inaugural A-League championship.
- 5 March – Australians Troy Corser and eventual World Champion Troy Bayliss win the two races making up the Australian Superbike Grand Prix at Phillip Island.
- 15 March-26 March – The 2006 Commonwealth Games take place in Melbourne. Australia finishes on top of the medal tally for the fifth consecutive time & wins a record 221 medals-84 gold, 69 silver & 68 bronze.
- 28 March – Queensland defeats Victoria to win the Pura Cup.
- 2 April – Eventual 2006 World Champion, Fernando Alonso takes victory for Renault F1 in the Australian Grand Prix at Albert Park, Melbourne.
- 30 April – St Kilda players & umpires fail to hear the final siren. St Kilda scores behind after siren has gone, resulting in the match being a draw. This is later overturned on an appeal to the AFL commission & Fremantle is awarded the four points.
- 17 May – At Sydney Football Stadium, Anthony Mundine defeats Danny Green in their long-awaited bout.
- 9 June-9 July – The Socceroos participate in the 2006 FIFA World Cup in Germany for the first time since 1974. They are drawn in Group F along with Brazil, Croatia & Japan. They come second in their group & face off against Italy. They lose to them 1–0 as a result of a controversial penalty awarded in the dying seconds of the match.
- 2 July – Lee Troop wins the men's national marathon title, clocking 2:14:13 in Brisbane, while Jennifer Gillard claims the women's title in 2:41:06.
- 5 July - The 2006 State of Origin series is won by Queensland who defeated New South Wales 16–14 in the third and deciding game at Melbourne's Telstra Dome before a crowd of 54,833. The Wally Lewis Medal for player of the series was awarded to Queensland's Darren Lockyer.
- 3 September – The Melbourne Storm win the minor premiership following the final main round of the 2006 NRL season, though the win would later be revoked in 2010 due to the club's salary cap breach. The South Sydney Rabbitohs finish in last position, claiming the wooden spoon.
- 5 September - The 2006 Dally M Awards are held at Sydney Town Hall and the Dally M Medal for player of the year is presented by prime minister John Howard to Cameron Smith of the Melbourne Storm.
- 8 September – Peter Brock dies in a smash while driving in the Targa West rally
- 17 September – Marco Melandri wins the 2006 Australian motorcycle Grand Prix held at the Phillip Island Grand Prix Circuit. Australian Chris Vermeulen was second.
- 30 September – In a rematch of the previous year's AFL Grand Final, the West Coast Eagles (12.13.85) defeat the Sydney Swans (12.12.84) to take out the 110th VFL/AFL premiership. It is the first time since 1966 that the Grand Final has been decided by a margin of one point.
- 1 October – The 2006 NRL grand final is won by the Brisbane Broncos, who defeated the Melbourne Storm 15–8 before a crowd of 79,609 at Sydney's Telstra Stadium. The Clive Churchill Medal was awarded to Brisbane's Shaun Berrigan. It is also the first time a team from New South Wales does not feature in the grand final, as well as the Broncos' most recent premiership win.
- 8 October – Craig Lowndes and Jamie Whincup win the 2006 Bathurst 1000 race for Triple Eight Race Engineering, Ford's first win since 1998. They are the inaugural winners of the Peter Brock Trophy.
- 28 October – Fields of Omagh ridden by Craig Williams wins the Cox Plate for the second time.
- 29 October – Mikko Hirvonen, and co-driver Jarmo Lehtinen, driving a Ford Focus win the last Rally Australia to be held in Western Australia after 19 years of the rally.
- 7 November – Delta Blues wins the 2006 Melbourne Cup.
- 21 November – Ian Thorpe announces his retirement from competitive swimming.
- 25 November - The 2006 Rugby League Tri-Nations tournament is won by Australia, who defeated New Zealand 16–12 in the final at Sydney's Sydney Football Stadium before a crowd of 27,325.
- 18 December – Australia wins the Third Ashes Test by 206 runs at the WACA Ground in Perth, claiming The Ashes.
- 21 December – Shane Warne announces that he will retire from cricket after the Fifth Ashes Test. Glenn McGrath announces he will do likewise after the 2007 Cricket World Cup on 23 December.

== Births ==
- 22 September - Luke Borusiewicz, murder victim (died 2009)

== Deaths ==
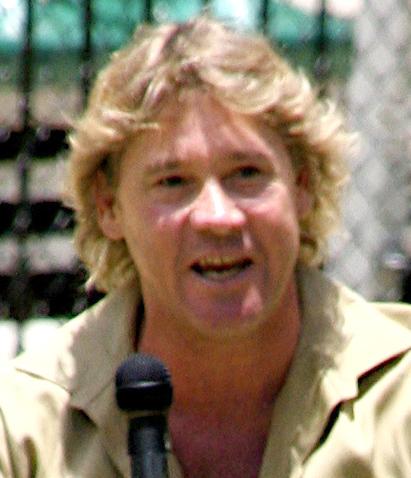
Steve Irwin

- 1 January – Dawn Lake, entertainer and television personality (b. 1927)
- 3 January – Steve Rogers, rugby league footballer (b. 1954)
- 5 January – Sophie Heathcote, actress (died in the United States) (b. 1970)
- 9 January – Andy Caldecott, motorcyclist (b. 1964)
- 31 January – Owen Abrahams, Australian rules footballer (Fitzroy) (b. 1933)
- 2 February – Sir Reginald Swartz, Queensland politician and soldier (b. 1911)
- 9 March – Harry Seidler, architect (born in Austria) (b. 1923)
- 28 March – Pro Hart, artist (b. 1928)
- 24 April – Jimmy Sharman Jr., rugby league footballer (b. 1912)
- 6 May – Grant McLennan, musician (b. 1958)
- 7 May – Richard Carleton, television journalist (b. 1943)
- 24 May – John Wheeldon, Western Australian politician (b. 1929)
- 4 July – John Hinde, broadcaster and film reviewer (b. 1911)
- 15 August – Rick Bourke, rugby league footballer (b. 1953)
- 18 August – Ken Kearney, rugby league footballer and coach (b. 1924)
- 28 August – Don Chipp, Victorian politician and founder of the Australian Democrats (b. 1925)
- 4 September
  - Steve Irwin, television personality, zookeeper, and conservationist (b. 1962)
  - Colin Thiele, author (b. 1920)
- 8 September – Peter Brock, motor racing driver (b. 1945)
- 11 September – Nancy Borlase, artist (born in New Zealand) (b. 1914)
- 15 September – Abe Saffron, hotelier, nightclub owner, and alleged criminal figure (b. 1919)
- 23 September – Brodie Panlock, suicide victim (b. 1987)
- 3 October – Peter Norman, Olympic athlete (b. 1942)
- 2 November – Wally Foreman, sports administrator and commentator (b. 1948)
- 11 November – Belinda Emmett, actress and singer (b. 1974)
- 27 November – Alan Freeman, disk jockey and radio personality (died in the United Kingdom) (b. 1927)
- 21 December – Scobie Breasley, jockey (b. 1914)
- 25 December – Sir Robert Cotton, New South Wales politician (b. 1915)

== See also ==
- 2006 in Australian television
- List of Australian films of 2006
