= Tool Academy =

Tool Academy is a reality TV franchise. It may refer to:

- Tool Academy (American TV series)
- Tool Academy (British TV series)
