= Jimmy Bates =

Australian rules footballer and boundary umpire

Personal information
- Full name: Thomas James Edward Bates
- Born: 25 June 1910; Nathalia
- Died: 6 October 2009 (aged 99)
- Original team: Nathalia
- Position: Wing

Playing career^{1}
Years	Club	Games (Goals)	
1933	Essendon	1 (0)	

Umpiring career
Years	League	Role	Games
1941	VFL	Boundary umpire	13
- ^{1} Playing statistics correct to the end of 1933.

Thomas James Edward Bates (25 June 1910 – 6 October 2009) was an Australian rules footballer for the Essendon Football Club and a boundary umpire in the Victorian Football League.

== Playing career ==
Bates played just one game in the VFL. Recruited to the Essendon seconds from Nathalia, he filled in as a wingman replacing Tom Clarke who was ill with the flu, and played his only league game on 6 May 1933, against St Kilda at Windy Hill.

In Bates' own words: "I played one game, had one kick and got paid three quid." Unhappy with his performance, Bates retired from football immediately after the game, and returned to his favoured sport of competitive running, winning the Keilor Gift in 1939.

== Umpiring career ==
Bates was appointed to the VFL list of boundary umpires for the 1941 season. He made his debut in the round 1 match Footscray versus Hawthorn earning Heritage Number 256. By the end of the season he had officiated in 13 league games.

A postal employee by trade, Bates volunteered for the Australian Imperial Force (AIF) on 27 January 1942 and was posted to 2 Australian Base Postal Unit St.Kilda. Despite a Melbourne posting he did not return to umpiring that season. In August 1942 he sailed for New Guinea, returning in December 1943. While overseas he contracted malaria for which he was hospitalised on his return. He was discharged from the AIF in June 1944.

Before his death on 6 October 2009, Bates was the oldest surviving VFL/AFL player.
