= Everest ER =

Seasonal medical clinic at the base of Mount Everest

Coordinates: 27.974514°N 86.931756°E

The Everest ER is a seasonal tent-based medical clinic at the Everest base camp (17,600 ft; 5,400 m) founded in 2003 by Dr. Luanne Freer, a volunteer physician for the nonprofit Himalayan Rescue Association (HRA) in Nepal and Associate Medical Director of Medcor, Inc. Volunteer doctors provide altitude-experienced health care and preventative education to the climbing community, their support staff and trekking-through public in base camp, using proceeds from this care to subsidize free/low cost health care for the Sherpa people of the Khumbu region of Nepal.

Staffed by volunteer physicians from all over the world, the ER works to stabilize patients for evacuation and descent or, in many cases, to definitively treat the illness or injury. Ninety percent of Everest ER patients are climbers or their support staff; the remaining 10% are trekkers-through or media and just over half of the patients every year are native Nepali. In 2018, Sherpas and locals comprised more than 60% of the clinic's patients. A retrospective analysis of the clinic's records from 2003 to 2012 identified medical causes such as high altitude cough and upper respiratory infections for 85.3% of the cases. The other 14% were trauma, primarily frostbite and lacerations.

According to Peter Hackett, a high-altitude physician, treating altitude illnesses on site at Everest ER reduces helicopter evacuations.

Everest ER has struggled to remain fiscally solvent. The clinic has accumulated some donated clinic supplies and equipment, including new custom-made tents, and solar panels to enable power to the equipment with clean, quiet, renewable energy. The 501C-3 non-profit organization Himalayan Rescue Association - USA (HRA-USA) was created in 2005 to help fund the clinic, a corporate sponsor (Medcor, Inc.) created and continues to manage the website and production companies filmed documentaries about the clinic in 2004, 2006, and 2007, which increased exposure to potential sponsors. The Everest ER has been well received and relied upon by more teams in the subsequent seasons – in the first 9 seasons the clinic logged over 2500 patient visits.

Freer's efforts to provide medical care on Everest were featured in the documentary Everest ER, which was a finalist at the Montreal Film Festival in 2006. In 2009, BBC One aired the 5-episode series Everest ER, which covered the clinic during a climbing season.
