= Salam Father =

- Written by: Max Walker
- Screenplay by: Max Walker
- Directed by: Max Walker, Salam Ziusudras
- Starring: Salam Ziusudras
- Original language: English
- No. of episodes: 1

Production
- Producers: Brian Beaton, Celia Tait
- Running time: 52 mins

Original release
- Network: SBS; Al-Jazeera International
- Release: 2009

Salam Father is a documentary film made by Australian filmmaker Salam Ziusudras in 2009.

== Summary ==
Ziusudras wrote and directed the film for the Special Broadcasting Services (SBS) channel and Al-Jazeera International. The film revolves around the filmmaker's personal journey to his homeland, Iraq, to find out how his father's body came to be in a mass grave.
