= Death of Luke Borusiewicz =

2009 accidental death in Australia

Luke Anthony Borusiewicz
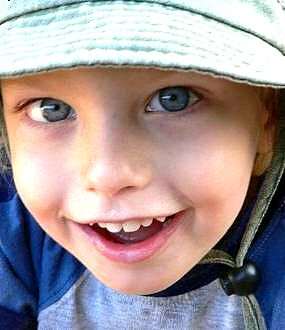
- Born: 22 September 2006; Cairns, Australia
- Died: 18 January 2009 (aged 2); Cairns Base Hospital

Luke Anthony Borusiewicz (22 September 2006 – 18 January 2009) was a toddler in Queensland, Australia, who died while under foster care administered by the Department of Community Services (DOCS), an agency of the Department of Communities, Queensland.

Borusiewicz died on Sunday 18 January 2009, aged 2 years. The inquest into his death found it to be accidental, the result of falling from his bed and striking his head. It was held amid a major review of the Department of Community Services' activities in the state of Queensland.

== History ==
Luke Anthony Borusiewicz was aged 2 years and 2 months when he died of head injuries sustained while in the custody of 'Joy', a 74-year-old foster carer, who at the time of his death, had three other foster children in her care. Borusiewicz had been removed from his parents on 5 July 2008 and placed into a foster home from 22 July to 24 December 2008. The premise for the child's removal was alleged drug use by his parents, although his father Michael Borusiewicz claimed he was "clean" for six months before his son's death.

On 23 December the original foster carers were unable to continue the placement due to their own personal circumstances and on 24 December Borusiewicz was placed with Joy. On 12 January 2009, he was admitted to hospital with an undefined head trauma. A DOCS child protection worker stated that the head injuries were acquired while an eight- to nine-year-old foster child was changing Borusiewicz's nappy. Contradictory information was conveyed from the carer, indicating that it was "thought" that Borusiewicz fell from a bed and hit his head. In a third account, the carer stated that he had hit his head during an incident, and then fallen asleep. Borusiewicz allegedly slept from approximately 11 am on the morning of 12 January 2009, and an ambulance was called at 4.45 pm when he could not be woken. When admitted Borusiewicz had to be ventilated. He was found to have a fractured skull, subdural haematoma and brain oedema. An emergency craniotomy was performed. After the operation he required continued ventilation and did not improve. Borusiewicz died after six days on 18 January 2009.

It is alleged that he had sustained previous injuries in his brief stay in foster care.

== Investigation and State Coroner's Report ==
The State Coroner's Court of Queensland conducted an investigation into Borusiewicz's death, the final summary of findings was handed down on 16 April 2013. The Coroner Kevin Priestly, found that "Luke accidentally fell while on his bed striking his head on the floor, possibly also striking his head on the bed frame during the fall to the floor."

Coroner Priestly found that on 12 January 2009:

5. Between 11.15 am and 1.45 pm (more likely it was closer to 11.15 am), Luke became upset and began jumping on his bed. He fell and struck his head on the bed frame and floor causing a severe head injury. The fall occurred while Joy was sleep. The 9-year-old foster girl and possibly the 12-year-old foster girl witnessed the fall.

6. On waking, Joy checked on Luke and the other children. Luke appeared asleep. Neither of the girls reported the fall to Joy.

7. When Joy did attempt to wake Luke, she found him unconscious and called an ambulance. Luke was taken to Cairns Base Hospital and died 6 days later from his head injuries

(n.b."Joy" was the child's foster carer)

A Department of Communities Placement Details document from 2008 stated:

The elderly carer must be sent children aged between three an 18 years of age. Respite and emergency care only, no long term, two short term placements maximum. No children under three years. Carer does not want children in nappies, due to age.

Officers from the Department of Communities said that the department had never seen the document. The foster carer, who cannot be named, had previously expressed reluctance to take in such a young ward of the state.

== State Inquiry into the Department of Community Services ==
As of July 2013 there is a major review into the activities of the Department of Communities, DOCS and related Child Safety sub-contractors and agencies, in the state of Queensland.

The inquiry into the Child Protection system was brought about by the results of the Commission of Inquiry into Abuse of Children in Queensland Institutions (the Forde Inquiry) and the Crime and Misconduct Commission Inquiry. The official preamble to the Queensland Child Protection Commission of Inquiry states (in part):

The Queensland Child Protection Commission of Inquiry was established on 1 July 2012 to review Queensland's child protection system.

The Hon Tim Carmody SC has been appointed as Commissioner and must provide a written report with recommendations to the Premier by 30 April 2013.

The terms of reference ask the Commissioner to make full and careful inquiry in an open independent manner of Queensland's child protection system, including in relation to: the implementation of recommendations by the Forde Inquiry and the Crime and Misconduct Commission reports into child abuse; whether the current use of available resources across the child protection system is adequate and whether resources could be used more efficiently; the current Queensland government response to children and families in the child protection system; the transition of children through, and exiting the child protection system; the effectiveness of monitoring, investigation, oversight and complaint mechanisms and ways to improve the oversight of and public confidence in the child protection system; and the adequacy of any government response and action taken by government to allegations of child sexual abuse in youth detention centres.

The Commissioner has been asked to include recommendations in his report on issues including: any reforms to ensure that Queensland’s child protection system achieves the best possible outcomes to protect children and support families; strategies to reduce the over-representation of Aboriginal and Torres Strait Islander children in the child protection system; and legislative reforms.
