= Style by Jury =

Canadian makeover show

Style by Jury is an original Canadian makeover show and format which aired on the W Network from 2004 to 2010. The series was created by Carolyn Meland and executive produced and co-developed with partners Romano D'Andrea and Jeff Preyra at Planetworks Inc.

== Plot ==
The premise of the show is centered around first impressions. Candidates are told they are doing an audition for a makeover, but are unaware they have been pre-selected for the show. Hidden in the auditioning room behind a two-way mirror, a jury is asked for honest first opinions about the candidate. Once the shock of the two-way mirror is revealed, the jury's first impression is played back on a monitor, and the candidate is often brought to tears. This sets the launchpad for the makeover journey, tackling both an exterior and interior transformation. At the end of an intensive one-week makeover, the candidate returns before an entirely different jury, which is unaware the subject has had a makeover. What kind of first impression will they make the second time around? Waiting in the wings is one last surprise "special" juror.

== The Makeover ==
The candidates undergo a top to toe overhaul, typically including extensive cosmetic dentistry, dermatology, hair, make-up, and fashion. The cornerstone of the makeover, however, is presented as the internal transformation and coaching which together enables the candidate to view themselves in a whole new light.

== Cast ==
Recurring principals on the show included:

- Host: Bruce Turner
- Wardrobe Consultant: David Clemmer
- Cosmetic Dermatologists: Dr. Kucy Pon and Dr. Fred Weksberg
- Lasik Eye Surgeons: Dr. Raymond M. Stein and Dr. Sheldon Herzig
- Cosmetic Surgeon: Dr. William Middleton
- Hair Stylists: Francesco Fontana and Johnny Cupello
- Make-up artist: Korby Banner
- Cosmetic Dentistry: Dr. Armaghan Afsar and Dr. Andrew Charkiw
- Bombshell Coach: Jacqueline Bradley

== International distribution ==
The series was first distributed by Picture Box's Kate Sanagan and Marily Kynaston and has aired on WE and in Singapore on MediaCorp Channel 5 since 2009, in the Netherlands RTL8, on Bulgarian and Serbian Fox Life, in France on Teva, in Spain on Divinity, and in the United States via syndication (through Program Partners) and Lifetime Real Women through Thunderbird Films.. A Russian version was licensed as well.

In Spain, this TV programme (Tu estilo a juicio) featured on the Divinity channel, which belongs to Mediaset España Comunicación. Mediaset España Comunicación is the largest television network company in Spain.

In 2014, the format rights for the series were acquired by LA production company Electus.

== American spinoff ==
On 13 February 2015, an American version of the series launched on TLC, hosted by Preston Konrad and Louise Roe. It was watched by 1,106,000 U.S. viewers.
