= 2009 Australian federal budget =

Australian federal budget 2009–10
- Submitted: 12 May 2009
- Submitted to: Parliament of Australia
- Country: Australia
- Parliament: 42nd
- Party: Australian Labor Party
- Treasurer: Wayne Swan
- Total revenue: A$290.6 billion^{‡}
- Total expenditures: A$338.2 billion
- Deficit: A$57.6 billion
- Website: http://www.budget.gov.au/2009-10/content/overview/html/index.htm Australian Budget 2009–2010
- ^{‡}Numbers in italics are projections.

The 2009 Australian federal budget for the Australian financial year ended 30 June 2010 was presented on 12 May 2009 by the Treasurer of Australia, Wayne Swan, the second federal budget presented by Swan, and the second budget of the first Rudd government. Swan commented that the budget would be tougher than in previous years. "Projected government revenue has fallen by $200 billion since the last budget because of the global economic crisis."

There were many allegedly planned leaks which released a number of headline details and bad news in the weeks beforehand.

== Forecasts ==
=== Deficit ===
- A 2009–10 deficit of $57.6 billion – 4.9% of GDP;
- A 2010–11 deficit of $57.1 billion – 4.7% of GDP;
- A 2011–12 deficit of $44.5 billion – 3.4% of GDP;
- A 2012–13 deficit of $28.2 billion – 2% of GDP and;
- A return to surplus in 2015–16.

=== Rising unemployment ===
- 8.25% for 2009–10;
- 8.5% for 2010–11;
- 7.5% for 2011–12 and;
- 6.5% for 2012–13.

=== Moderately decreased growth ===
Real GDP

- -0.5% for 2009–10;
- 2.25% for 2010–11;
- 4.5% for 2011–12 and;
- 4.5% for 2012–13.

Inflation

- 1.75% for 2009–10;
- 1.5% for 2010–11;
- 2.0% for 2011–12 and;
- 2.5% for 2012–13.

== Revenue mix ==
A$210 billion decrease in revenue was forecast over the next four years, with the 2009–10 deficit expected to be in excess of $50 billion. Labor suggested that the decrease in revenue, brought about by the 2008 financial crisis, was the primary reason for the deficit.

=== Taxation ===
Labor budgetary policy on taxation is to keep it below the 2007–2008 level of 24.7% of GDP over the medium term. After taking into account regulatory changes to eliminate "tax minimisation" through employee share schemes, taxation receipts come in at 22% of GDP. The government has not indicated whether it will be modifying its target for 2010–2011, in light of the forecast contraction in growth.

- Income tax cuts worth $11 billion.
- A 30–50% small business tax break for eligible assets. Total cost unknown.

== Expenditure mix ==
Overall expenditure is expected to increase in 2009/2010 by 1.6% of GDP. The key feature of the budget was a third round of spending to provide long-term stimulus. Overall, spending has increased by 4.6% of GDP since the last Howard/Costello budget (2007/2008).

=== General government ===
- Payments to the States increased to $50.1 billion
- First home owners grant boost to be extended for another six months, but at a reduced rate after three. Expected to cost $539 million.
- Reduced spending on agriculture

=== Social security and welfare ===
Labor budgetary policy separates aged care from other welfare expenditure. The budget saw synchronised changes across the public sector as the government decided to lift the pension age and also moved to lift the superannuation preservation age. Two reports which accompanied the budget, the Pension Review Report and the Henry review on tax strategy, argued the need for a single means test—more comprehensive than testing assets and income separately, standard practice since 1985—to promote other forms of saving.

- A pension increase of $32.49 per week for singles and $10.14 per week combined for couples on the full rate.
- The qualifying age for the Old Age Pension will be progressively increased to 67 years by 2023, reflecting increases in life expectancy, and consistent with international trends.
- System will cost $36 billion by 2012–2013

==== Initiatives ====
- Starting in 2011, there will be an 18-week minimum wage parental leave. This paid parental leave scheme will be for 18 weeks at $544 a week. Total cost unknown.

=== Infrastructure, transport and energy ===
The government will invest more than $22 billion for "Nation Building Infrastructure" in transport, broadband, clean energy, universities and health care.

Infrastructure investments
Capital type	Breakdown of numbers
$8.5 billion investment in transport	$4.6 billion for improvements to metropolitan trains; $3.4 billion for improvements to national roads; $389 million for ports in Western Australia and the Northern Territory
$4.7 billion down-payment on the National Broadband Network	
$4.5 billion investment in clean energy development	$2 billion for a Carbon capture and storage program; $1.5 billion for a solar energy program; $465 million seed funding for Renewables Australia
$1.584 billion investment in universities and trade schools	$934 million for approved projects; $650 million set aside for future projects related to clean energy
$1.1 billion investment in public research agencies	$901 million for research infrastructure

- $8.5 billion investment in transport
  - $4.6 billion for improvements to metropolitan trains
  - $3.4 billion for improvements to national roads
  - $389 million for ports in Western Australia and the Northern Territory
- $4.7 billion down-payment on the National Broadband Network
- $4.5 billion investment in clean energy development
  - $2 billion for a Carbon Capture and Storage program
  - $1.5 billion for a solar energy program
  - $465 million seed funding for Renewables Australia
- $3.2 billion investment in hospitals

=== Education ===
- $1.584 billion investment in universities and trade schools
  - $934 million for 31 approved projects
    - $613 million for infrastructure
    - $322 million for laboratories and research training facilities
  - $650 million set aside for projects related to clean energy
    - $400 million for laboratories and research training facilities
    - $250 million for infrastructure
- $1.1 billion investment in public research agencies
  - $901 million for research infrastructure related to the critical disciplines

=== Defence ===
- $1.7 billion for military operations in Afghanistan, East Timor and the Solomon Islands
- $654 million to combat people smuggling
- $685 million for national security
- $36 million cut in funding for quarantine and plant and animal health

=== Health ===
- $64 billion over five years for public hospitals and health;
- $1.5bn to upgrade hospitals around Australia;
- Private health insurance rebate to be means tested;
- $2 billion for cancer care infrastructure;
- Medibank Private to become a for-profit Government owned business.

=== Community services and culture ===
==== Initiatives ====
- $136 million to develop an advertising-free digital children's channel on the ABC and $22 million for SBS to produce local material.

== Opposition and crossbench response ==
Shadow Treasurer Joe Hockey challenged the government's projections for a return to budget surplus, claiming that growth projections were above historical trends. The Leader of the Opposition, Malcolm Turnbull, called on the Prime Minister to reveal the full economic modelling used in the Treasury outlook.

In his formal response to the budget, Turnbull announced opposition to the reduction in private health insurance rebates, proposing that the funds be sourced by raising the tax on cigarettes by 3 cents instead. The Greens criticised the budget for supporting the coal industry and indicated their support for Turnbull's cigarette tax proposal. Family First Senator Steve Fielding criticised the government for breaking its election promise to maintain private health insurance rebates.

== Reception ==
Reaction from business lobby groups was mixed, with the Australian Chamber of Commerce and Industry and the Australian Industry Group supporting the capital spending but critical of the plan to return to budget surplus. National Seniors Australia and ACOSS welcomed the increase to age pensions, but raised concerns that sole parents, the young and unemployed had been ignored. International ratings agencies Standard & Poor's, and Fitch Group, said that the budget did not risk Australia's AAA rating as the country's finances remained sound.

An ongoing Westpac survey found that consumer confidence dropped as a result of the budget. Surveyed consumers anticipated that stimulus payments in the form of cash bonuses were no longer an option for the government, and their expectations of a turnaround during the following five years dwindled. The fall is equal to about half of last month's gain.

Come 22 May, as senators and Treasury officials prepared for the Senate estimates committee hearings on the budget, the government faced strident criticism from chief executives, unions and small companies over the changes to employee share schemes.

== See also ==
- Australian national debt
