= Department of Communities, Child Safety and Disability Services =

State government department in Queensland, Australia

Department of Families, Seniors, Disability Services and Child Safety
Department overview
- Jurisdiction: Queensland
- Headquarters: 111 George Street, Brisbane
- Minister responsible: Minister for Families, Seniors and Disability Services Minister for Child Safety and the Prevention of Domestic and Family Violence.
- Department executive: Michael Hogan, Director-General
- Website: families.qld.gov.au

The Department of Families, Seniors, Disability Services and Child Safety is a department in the Queensland Government which is responsible for providing a number of social services. Minister for Families, Seniors and Disability Services and Minister for Child Safety and the Prevention of Domestic and Family Violence are responsible for the department. The department's head office is at 111 George Street in the Brisbane CBD.

The department has a range of focus areas in the delivery of human services including Aboriginal and Torres Strait Islander Services, child safety, disability, community care, housing, homelessness, multicultural affairs, sport, recreation and women. The department is divided across seven regions: South East, South West, Far North Queensland, North Queensland, North Coast, Brisbane and Central Queensland.

In 2009, the Department of Housing was abolished. The Department of Communities assumed the responsibility for administering the Housing Act 2003.

== Functions ==
The Department of Families, Seniors, Disability Services and Child Safety is responsible for developing policy on community engagement, volunteering, crime prevention, family and domestic violence prevention, family support as well as support for individuals affected by problem gambling and alcohol abuse. It also provides support to those dealing with homelessness, disaster recovery and enabling the aged and youth to engage government services and information.

== See also ==
- Queensland Housing Commission
