= Leyland brothers =

Australian explorers and filmmakers

Leyland brothers (MBE)
- Occupations: Explorers; documentary film makers; television presenters; writers; memoirists
- Notable work: Ask the Leyland Brothers (TV series)
- Mike Leyland
- Birth name: Michael James Leyland
- Born: 4 September 1941, Hitchin, Hertfordshire, England, United Kingdom
- Death: September 14, 2009 (aged 68), Newcastle, New South Wales, Australia
- Mal Leyland
- Birth Name: Malcolm Rex Leyland
- Born: 2 October 1944 (age 82), Hitchin, Hertfordshire, England, United Kingdom

The Leyland brothers were an English-born Australian sibling duo of explorers, documentary filmmakers, television presenters and writers consisting of Michael James "Mike" Leyland, MBE (4 September 1941 – 14 September 2009) and Malcolm Rex "Mal" Leyland, MBE (born 2 October 1944).

The Leylands were best known for their popular television travel show, Ask the Leyland Brothers, which aired on the Nine Network from 1976 to 1980 and 1983 to 1984. Through their exploits the brothers introduced many Australians to the sights of the Australian outback.

== Biography ==
=== Early life ===
In 1950, when Mike was eight and Mal was five they migrated with their parents from Hitchin, North Hertfordshire, England to Newcastle, New South Wales, Australia. Their parents ran a local store. Mike would later attend Wallsend Public School. The brothers grew up watching documentaries by Armand and Michaela Denis.

When aged 15, Mike won a trip to the 1956 Olympic Games in Melbourne from a cartoon-drawing competition, and his father bought him a 16mm movie camera to take along. The teenage brothers would later use the camera to film themselves and their friends as they explored outback New South Wales. They also planned to use the camera to film a journey to Uluru in their father's Morris Minor; a mechanic friend persuaded them to trade in the car for an old Land Rover. Once there the brothers then attempted to drive the vehicle up the side of the rock but were unsuccessful.

=== Documentary films and television series ===
Mike started his media career aged 21 as a news cameraman at NBN Television, whilst Mal, age 18, was working as a cadet at Newcastle's now-defunct newspaper The Sun.

The Leylands soon realised there existed a wide public interest in seeing the Australian outback, and starting in 1961 they set out on their own to make documentary films that explored Australia. The first, Down the Darling, was released in 1963, and saw the brothers becoming the first people to travel the length of the Darling River in an aluminium dinghy. For their next adventure, 1966's Wheels Across a Wilderness, the brothers decided to film a 5-month 4WD trek from the western-most point of Australia to the eastern-most point of the country, crossing straight through the arid interior and bringing along a sample of water from the Indian Ocean. During the journey the Leylands became the first filmmakers to capture Uluru during the wet season. One of the two 1956 Land Rover Series I 4WDs used by the brothers to complete their journey is now on display at the National Motor Museum of Australia.

A third expedition, 1969's Open Boat to Adventure, saw them retrace the maritime voyage of Matthew Flinders from Darwin to Sydney in a small open boat, which took six months to complete and along the way saw Mal electrocuted and the brothers rescued from rough seas by a prawn trawler. “What a cocky, arrogant pair of smart-arses Mike and I were", Mal Leyland later reflected in his 2015 memoir. A fourth film, The Wet, followed in 1972, documenting a journey through the Northern Territory to Kakadu National Park via Darwin.

The Leylands initially edited their films in a makeshift editing suite in their basement. The brothers arranged film screenings at small cinemas and halls to show their documentaries, and would net up to $15,000 ($201,913 in 2020) from a two-week showing. The popularity of their films led to several television series being developed, the first being 1970's Off the Beaten Track.

Their most popular TV series, Ask the Leyland Brothers, ran on Australian television on the Nine Network from 1976 to 1980, and again from 1983 to 1984. The show involved viewers writing in with questions and requests for places they wanted to see the brothers visit, in which they would do so in a Volkswagen Kombi van (and later two 4WD vehicles), often along with their wives and children. All 156 episodes were shot in the Super 8 mm film format, and edited in the style of a home movie.

The show became extremely successful, and at its height attracted 2.5 million viewers an episode, which was about 40% of the audience at the time. The Leylands became famous celebrities, with viewers often recognising the brothers and their wives as they scouted for locations, sometimes forcing them to go incognito. Satirical television host Norman Gunston called them “the Starsky and Hutch of the dead centre” during an interview with the brothers on a 1976 episode of his popular variety program. The success of the series provided many Australian television viewers with their first look at some of the lesser-known parts of the Australian outback as well as New Zealand, and its theme song remains well known amongst older Australians.

A documentary series called Leyland Brothers' World followed in the late 1980s. Rather than viewers writing in and asking the Leyland brothers to visit a particular place in Australia, it focused on exploration by the Leyland brothers and their families around Australia in a double-decker bus.

=== Leyland Brothers World theme park, bankruptcy and split ===
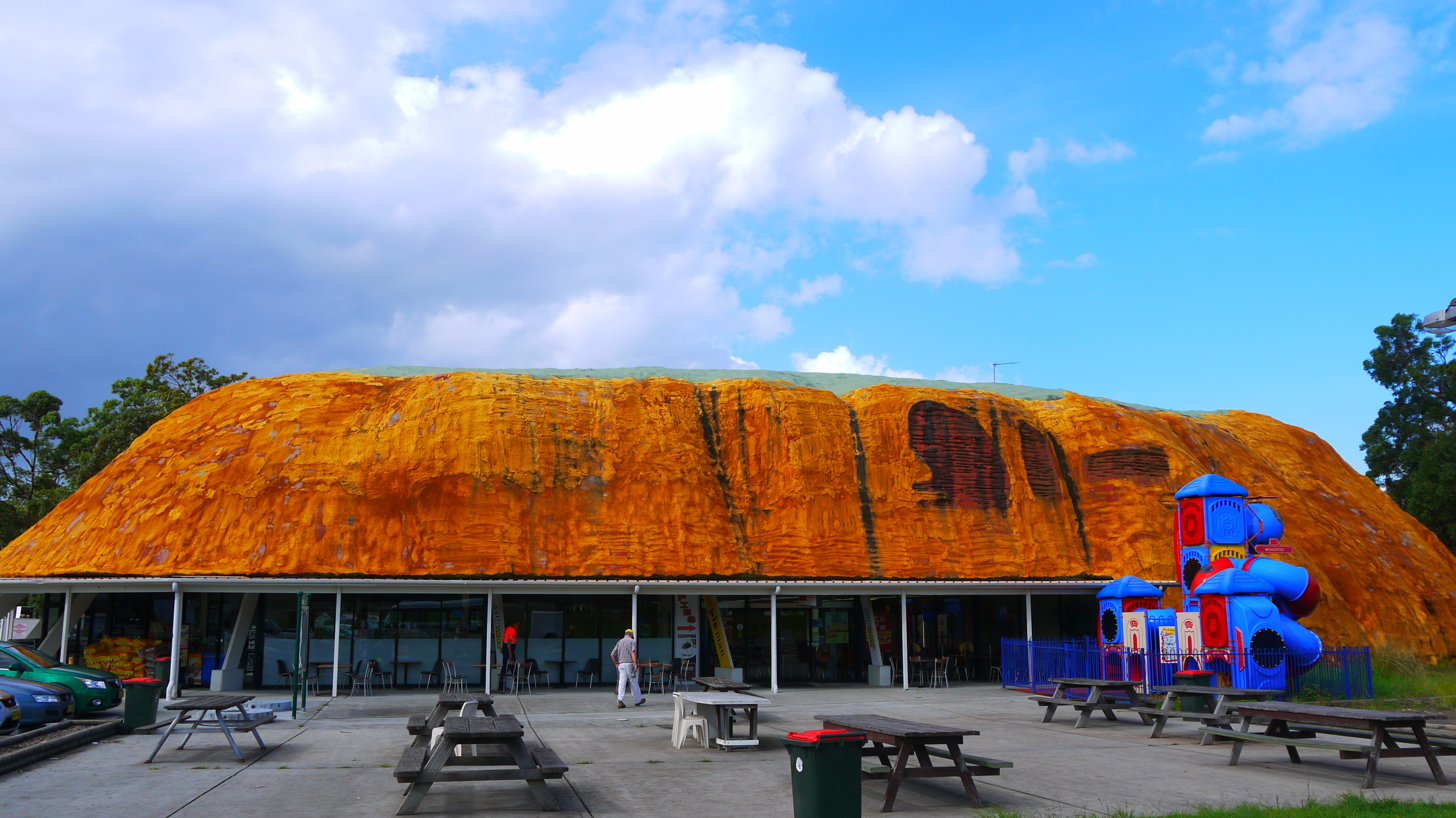
The Rock Roadhouse and Uluru replica, formerly of Leyland Brothers World, in May 2014, when it was being used as a petrol station and fast food centre. The roadhouse and replica burnt down in 2018.

Although the continued success of their films and television series made the brothers wealthy, they made efforts to spread out their business interests by investing in property and looked to leverage their name in the hospitality and tourism sector. In November 1990 the Leyland brothers opened the Leyland Brothers World theme park at North Arm Cove on the New South Wales Mid North Coast. The park contained amusement rides, a playground, a roadhouse and a 1/40 scale replica of Uluru along with other attractions, as well as a bush camp with a capacity to host 144 guests.

Despite an estimated annual attendance of about 400,000 people, in July 1992 BDO Nelson was appointed receiver and manager of the park when the Leylands failed to meet their loan commitments to the Commonwealth Bank. In a 1997 article in The Sunday Age, Mike Leyland said that the initial $1 million loan had blown out due to rain during construction and was further compounded by a 27% interest rate. The theme park was sold to new owners in November 1992 for $800,000, and as of 2026 continues to operate as the Great Aussie Bush Camp. The brothers went bankrupt.

The failure of Leyland Brothers World as well as personal tensions that simmered in the years beforehand led to a personal and professional rift between the two brothers and they went their separate ways, dissolving their 31-year filmmaking partnership. In 2015, Mal Leyland told Australian Story that "in hindsight, Leyland Brothers World was a huge mistake, the biggest mistake we ever made." Contrary to media speculation that they weren't on speaking terms, in the years afterwards the brothers still saw each other regularly, and even shared information about their new independent television projects on rival networks.

=== Later life ===
After the 1992 bankruptcy, Mike and his second wife Margie ran a New Lambton video store and worked for the park's new owner. In 1997 Mike sold part of his Tea Gardens property to fund the production of a far-north Queensland film for Channel Seven. Mike and his wife Margie later signed a contract with Seven for a further 12 one-hour documentaries, the first of which aired in 1998 in The World Around Us slot. The series of documentaries were later released on DVD under the title Travel All Over The Countryside. On 14 September 2009, Mike Leyland died from Parkinson's disease; he was 68 years old. Mal had met with his brother shortly before he died, suggesting that they go on one last adventure. Mike is survived by his wife Margie, his daughters Kerry, Sandy and Dawn, his stepdaughters Sarah and Alison, and seven grandchildren.

Mal and his wife Laraine ran a photo processing lab in Queensland and in 1997 launched a bi-monthly travel magazine, Leyland's Australia. In 2000 Mal produced the television show Leyland's Australia, with Laraine, daughter Carmen and her husband Robert Scott, in which they travelled around Australia in an RV and a camping trailer. In April 2000 Channel Nine cancelled the show after six episodes but the series was then picked up by Network Ten. Mal and Laraine have also written travel stories for ROAM magazine, a number of novels and cookbooks, and in 2015, Mal published his memoirs, entitled Still Travelling. Laraine died on 22 November 2018 in Tasmania aged 75. In 2019 Mal became a travel correspondent for Studio 10, and as of 2021 contributes to The Camping & Off Road Radio Show. In 2023 he announced plans to film a project with daughter Carmen.

== Filmography ==
=== Documentaries ===
- Down the Darling (1963) – A trip from Mungindi, Queensland, to Mildura, Victoria, following the 2,300-kilometre course of the Darling River, part of Australia's longest river system, in a small aluminium boat. An accompanying book was titled Great Ugly River and was published by Lansdowne Press in 1965.
- Wheels Across a Wilderness (1966) – Driving two Land Rovers from Steep Point, Western Australia, across the centre of the continent to Cape Byron, New South Wales. The trip was also published as a book, Where Dead Men Lie.
- Open Boat to Adventure (1969) – A six-month journey from Darwin to Sydney in an 18-foot open boat, following the coast around Arnhem Land and Cape York. The book was titled Untamed Coast.
- The Wet (1972) – Documents a journey to what is now called Kakadu National Park via Darwin. There were no sealed roads to the north-west part of the Northern Territory at the time. It also provides footage of a Darwin before Cyclone Tracy.

==== Travel All Over The Countryside ====
Travel All Over The Countryside was originally a series of one-hour documentaries commissioned by the Seven Network in the late 1990s and produced by Mike and Margie Leyland. The films were later released on DVD by Flashback Entertainment.

- Lure of the Red Centre
- Border Country
- The Stormy Coast
- Outback Coast
- Along and Beyond the Tanami Track
- Tracks of the Past
- Travel Across The Cape
- Travel to the Lost City
- Trek Around The Pilbara
- Kakadu and Beyond
- Cape York Adventure

=== Television series ===
- Off the Beaten Track, 1970–1972
- Trekabout, 1974–1975
- Ask the Leyland Brothers – Nine Network, 1976–1980 and 1983–1984.
- The Leyland Brothers Great Outdoors – Seven Network, 1980–1984
- Leyland Brothers' World
- Leyland's Australia – Network Ten, 2000

== Bibliography ==
- Still Travelling: Mal Leyland. Mal Leyland (2015)
- Gold fever: Is it the perfect crime?. Mal Leyland (2000)
- Gypsy's Animal Alphabet. Mal and Mike Leyland (1982)
- Mike and Mal Leyland's Australian Animals A to Z. Mike and Mal Leyland, Golden Press (1980)
- Trekabout. Mike and Mal Leyland, Golden Press (1977)
- Leyland Brothers Australian Wildlife. Mike and Mal Leyland, Golden Press (1976)
- Leyland Brothers Australia. Mike and Mal Leyland, Golden Press (1975)
- Further Off The Beaten Track. Mike and Mal Leyland, Golden Press (1974)
- Off The Beaten Track. Mike and Mal Leyland, Golden Press (1973)
- Untamed Coast: Darwin to Sydney in an 18 ft. Boat. Mike and Mal Leyland, Lansdowne Press (1969)
- Where Dead Men Lie: An Adventurous Journey that Spanned a Continent. Mike and Mal Leyland (1967)
- Great Ugly River: A Modern Adventure in Australia’s Outback. Mike and Mal Leyland (1965)

== Honours ==
In 1980 the brothers were awarded the MBE for services to the film industry.

In 2019 Mal Leyland received the Lifetime of Adventure award from Australian Geographic.
