= Ask the Leyland Brothers =

- Genre: Travel
- Created by: Mike and Mal Leyland
- Directed by: Mike and Mal Leyland
- Starring: Mike Leyland; Mal Leyland; Pat Leyland; Laraine Leyland
- Theme music composer: The Provost Brothers
- Opening theme: "Ask the Leyland Brothers"
- Country of origin: Australia
- Original language: English
- No. of series: 5
- No. of episodes: 153

Production
- Editor: Mike Newling

Original release
- Network: Nine Network
- Release: 1976 – 1984

Ask the Leyland Brothers is an Australian television show that screened on the Nine Network for 153 episodes between 1976 and 1980, and later between 1983 and 1984. The series followed documentary filmmakers Mike and Mal Leyland, as well as their wives and children, who travelled across Australia and New Zealand in response to questions and requests posed by viewers.

== Development ==
Prior to embarking on Ask the Leyland Brothers, the Leylands had made four feature films and two previous television series. The films Down the Darling, Wheels Across a Wilderness, Open Boat to Adventure and The Wet were produced between 1963 and 1972, and followed the brothers on four journeys across different parts of Australia. The television series, Off the Beaten Track and Trekabout, were produced during the early to mid-1970s.

Inspiration for the new series came from You Asked for It, an American series in which Art Baker would fulfil requests from viewers that were sent in via postcards; the series was broadcast in Australia during the 1970s. Ask the Leyland Brothers was intended to follow a similar format, with viewers nominating places which the Leyland brothers would visit and cover in each episode. According to Mike Leyland, the plan was for readers to feel involved when their names were read out, thus causing them to encourage their "mates" to watch the show as well.

== Production ==
In order to get things started, in 1976 the brothers filmed an initial pilot episode which mapped out the format, and placed a full-page advertisement in TV Week magazine to garner questions and requests. The format proved to be successful, and at one stage the show had 2.5 million viewers an episode, which was about 40% of the audience at the time. The popularity of the show led to viewers recognising the brothers and their wives while they were scouting for locations, sometimes forcing them to go incognito.

Initially the brothers travelled in an orange Volkswagen Kombi (later upgraded to a pair of 4WD vehicles), and the show was filmed in Super 8 and edited in the style of a home movie. The format, combined with the Leyland's onscreen manner and the presence of their families gave the show a "home-spun" feel.
