= 2007 in Australia =

- Monarch: Elizabeth II
- Governor-General: Michael Jeffery
- Prime minister: John Howard, then Kevin Rudd
- Elections: NSW, Federal

The following lists events that happened during 2007 in Australia.

- Decades: 1980s; 1990s; 2000s; 2010s; 2020s
- See also: 2007 in Australian television; 2007 in Australian literature; Other events of 2007; Federal election; Timeline of Australian history

== Incumbents ==
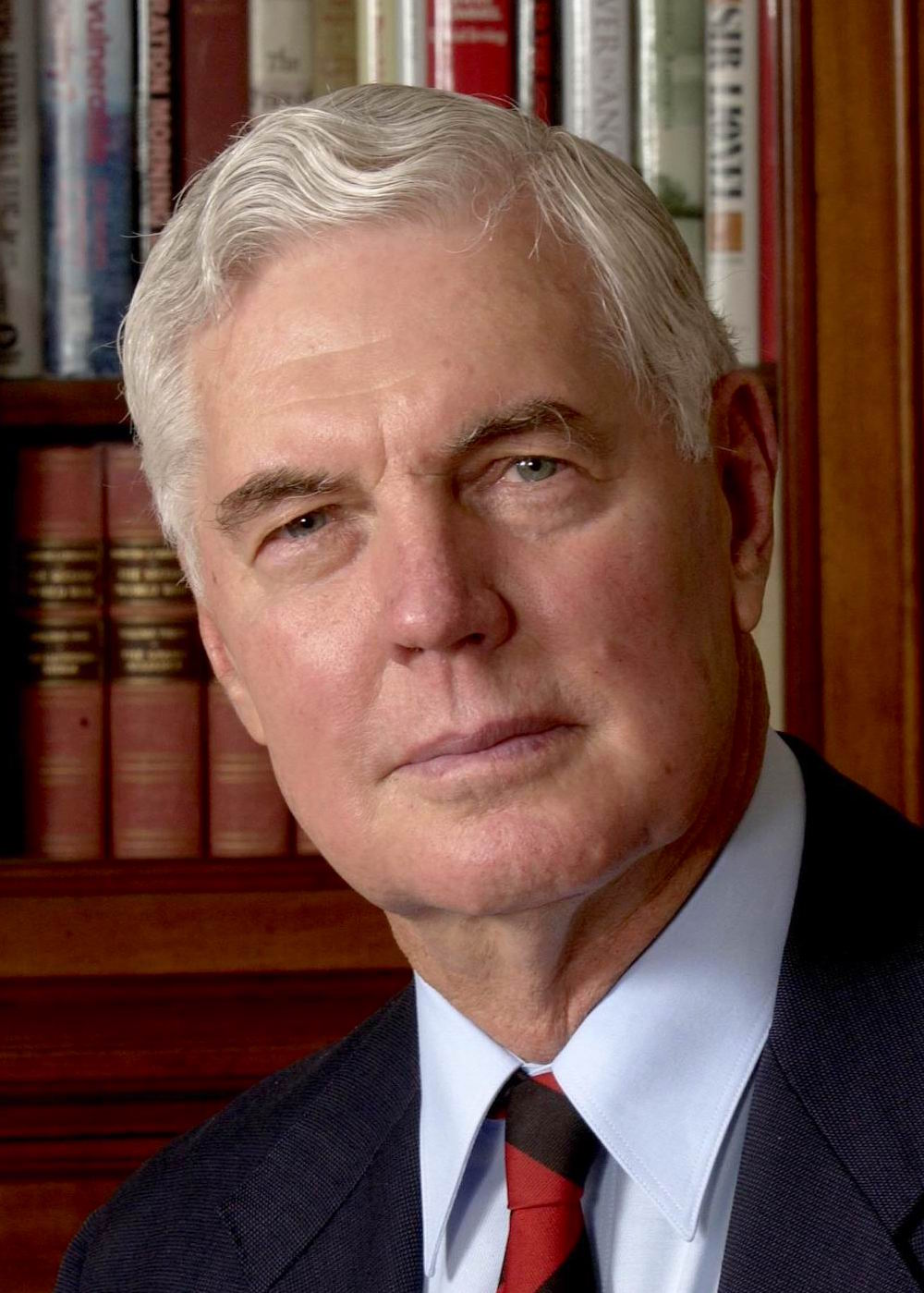
Michael Jeffery

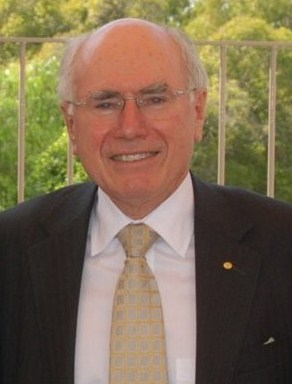
John Howard

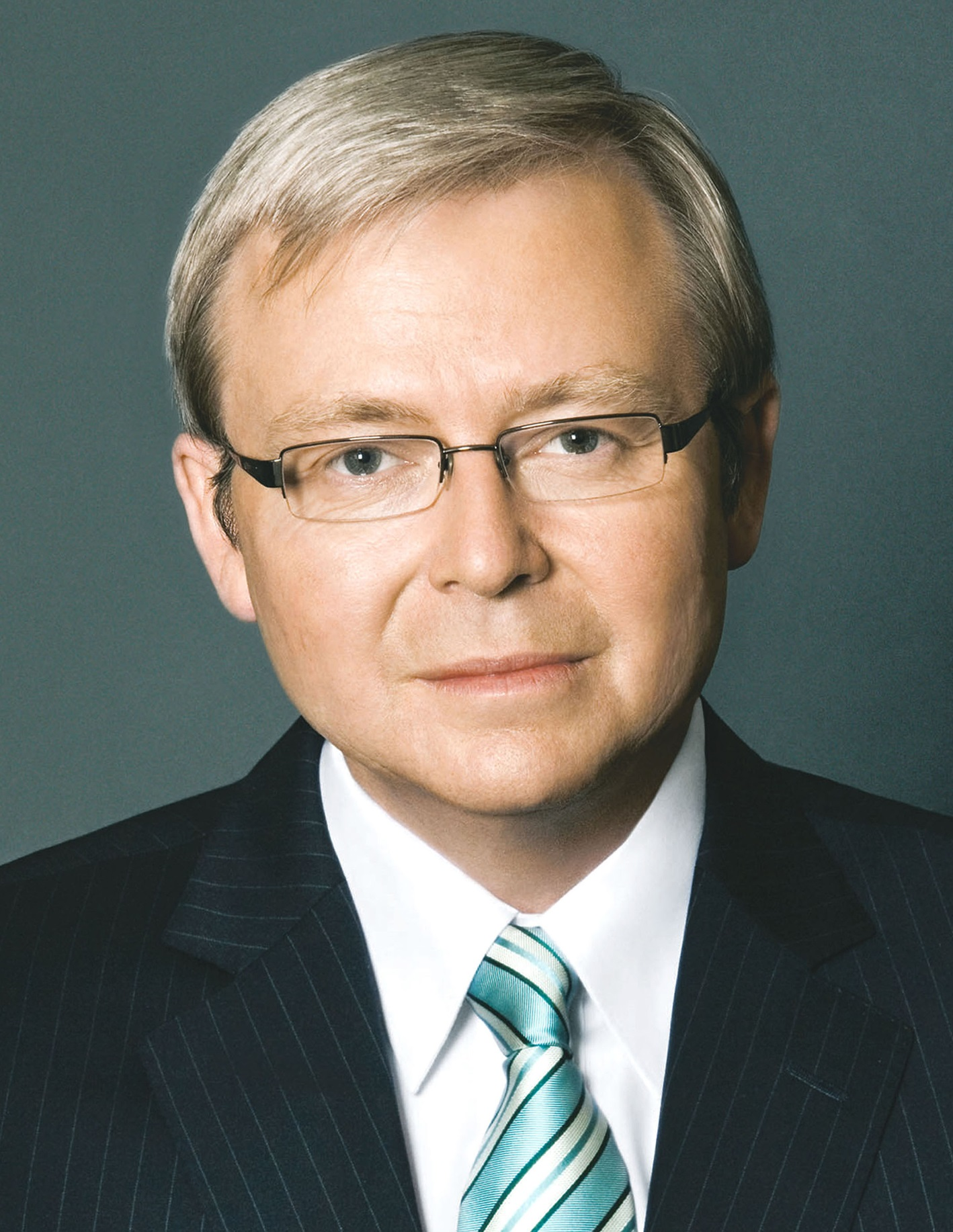
Kevin Rudd

- Monarch – Elizabeth II
- Governor-General – Michael Jeffery
- Prime Minister – John Howard (until 3 December), then Kevin Rudd
  - Deputy Prime Minister – Mark Vaile (until 3 December), then Julia Gillard
  - Opposition Leader – Kevin Rudd (until 3 December), then Brendan Nelson
- Chief Justice – Murray Gleeson

=== State and territory leaders ===
- Premier of New South Wales – Morris Iemma
  - Opposition Leader – Peter Debnam (until 2 April), then Barry O'Farrell
- Premier of Queensland – Peter Beattie (until 13 September), then Anna Bligh
  - Opposition Leader – Jeff Seeney
- Premier of South Australia – Mike Rann
  - Opposition Leader – Iain Evans (until 12 April), then Martin Hamilton-Smith
- Premier of Tasmania – Paul Lennon
  - Opposition Leader – Will Hodgman
- Premier of Victoria – Steve Bracks (until 30 July), then John Brumby
  - Opposition Leader – Ted Baillieu
- Premier of Western Australia – Alan Carpenter
  - Opposition Leader – Paul Omodei
- Chief Minister of the Australian Capital Territory – Jon Stanhope
  - Opposition Leader – Bill Stefaniak (until 13 December), then Zed Seselja
- Chief Minister of the Northern Territory – Clare Martin (until 26 November), then Paul Henderson
  - Opposition Leader – Jodeen Carney
- Chief Minister of Norfolk Island – David Buffett (until 28 March), then Andre Nobbs

=== Governors and administrators ===
- Governor of New South Wales – Marie Bashir
- Governor of Queensland – Quentin Bryce
- Governor of South Australia – Marjorie Jackson-Nelson (until 8 August), then Kevin Scarce
- Governor of Tasmania – William Cox
- Governor of Victoria – David de Kretser
- Governor of Western Australia – Ken Michael
- Administrator of the Australian Indian Ocean Territories – Neil Lucas
- Administrator of Norfolk Island – Grant Tambling (until 7 August), then Owen Walsh
- Administrator of the Northern Territory – Ted Egan (until 31 October), then Tom Pauling

== Events ==
=== Whole year ===
- Year of the Surf Lifesaver

=== January ===
- 1 January – An estimated five hundred rioters turn on police in Rye, Victoria.
- 4 January – Storms lash the town of Esperance, Western Australia. A natural disaster area is declared.
- 13 January – Youth attending an illegal drag race in the Melbourne suburb of Noble Park turn on police throwing flares and trashing a video store.
- 15 January – The first day of competition at the Australian Open is marred by clashes between Serbian and Croatian supporters and the Victorian police.
- 16 January – Large parts of Victoria are hit with power outages, including Melbourne, Geelong and Bendigo, after bushfires knock out power transmission lines connecting the state to the national electricity grid.
- 23 January – John Howard reshuffles his federal cabinet. Such changes include the sacking of the Immigration Minister, Amanda Vanstone.
- 26 January – Organisers of the Big Day Out in Sydney plead with event-goers not to bring Australian flags with them, fearing outbreaks of racial violence. The plea is ignored, and the day passes without incident.
- 31 January – A report commissioned by the Government of New South Wales predicts large temperature rises and a decrease in rainfall of up to 40 per cent over the next 70 years.

=== February ===
- 5 February – The first inquest into the deaths of the Balibo Five begins.
- 7 February – James Hardie announces it has approved long-term compensation arrangements for asbestos victims.
- 11 February – Prime Minister John Howard causes a diplomatic stir when he publicly criticises U.S. presidential nominee Barack Obama for his plan to withdraw U.S. troops from Iraq.

=== March ===
- 3 March – Liberal Senator Ian Campbell resigns his cabinet portfolio as Minister for Human Services after it is revealed that he, like Kevin Rudd, had met with disgraced former Premier of Western Australia, Brian Burke.
- 4 March – At the request of president Xanana Gusmão and prime minister José Ramos-Horta, Australian Special Air Service troops raid a rebel stronghold in Same, East Timor, in an attempt to capture rebel leader Alfredo Reinhado. Four Timorese men are killed in the battle, and Reinhado escapes.
- 6 March – The Australian government approves a proposed A$11.1 billion sale of the national airline Qantas to an international consortium after the Foreign Investment Review Board finds that the sale would not breach foreign ownership laws.
- 7 March – Five Australians are killed when Garuda Indonesia Flight 200 crashes and explodes in Java: a journalist, two Australian Federal Police officers, an Australian embassy official and a foreign aid worker.
- 8 March – Two people are killed when Severe Tropical Cyclone George makes landfall near Port Hedland, Western Australia. A third death occurs three days later when a man dies of head injuries sustained in the cyclone.
- 9 March – Shadow Attorney-General Kelvin Thomson resigns from the Opposition front bench after it is revealed that he wrote a positive character reference for Melbourne gangland figure and fugitive Tony Mokbel six years ago.
- 14 March – An electrical fault on a Northern Line train near the Sydney Harbour Bridge strands 4,000 passengers on Sydney's CityRail train system for nearly three hours, and causes substantial delays during the evening rush hour.
- 16 March – Senator Santo Santoro resigns as Minister for Ageing following a scandal involving his ownership of shares in a company related to his portfolio. He resigns from the Senate on 20 March.
- 18 March – More than 200,000 people walk across the Sydney Harbour Bridge to celebrate its 75th anniversary.
- 23 March – Three people are killed when three trucks and four cars are involved in a major collision and explosion in Melbourne's Burnley Tunnel.
- 23 March – The PlayStation 3 games console is released in Australia, exactly a year after the Australian release of Microsoft's Xbox 360.
- 24 March – The Australian Labor Party and Premier Morris Iemma are returned to power with a reduced majority in the 2007 New South Wales state election. Peter Debnam resigns as Opposition Leader & Barry O'Farrell is elected leader on 4 April.
- 26 March – Australian Guantanamo Bay detainee David Hicks pleads guilty to a charge of providing material support for terrorism before a United States military commission in Cuba.
- 28 March – Four people are killed after a private charter boat collides with a Sydney Harbour ferry.
- 29 March – New South Wales Police arrest three people, including an Australian Army captain, for alleged involvement in the theft and distribution of M72 LAW rocket launchers to criminals.
- 31 March – Earth Hour, in which Sydneysiders were encouraged to turn off their lights between 7:30 pm and 8:30 pm, takes place.

=== April ===
- 2 April – The Bureau of Meteorology issues a tsunami warning for the east coast of Australia after an earthquake in the South Pacific Ocean is detected. Precautions are taken, such as the suspension of Sydney Ferries services, but Australia is unaffected. The tsunami, however, causes devastation in the Solomon Islands.
- 10 April – Four elderly residents of the Broughton Hall nursing home in Melbourne die after a gastroenteritis outbreak at the home over the Easter weekend. A fifth resident dies in hospital on 16 April.
- 19 April – Prime Minister John Howard announces a report which states that unless significant rain falls in the Murray-Darling Basin within the next six to eight weeks, Australia will face a major agricultural crisis with no irrigation allocations available to farmers.
- 24 April – Two Australian soldiers are injured when a roadside bomb goes off in Iraq.
- 26 April – Former immigration minister Senator Amanda Vanstone announces her immediate resignation from the Australian Senate. It is announced later that day that Vanstone will take up the position of Australia's Ambassador to Italy in late June.

=== May ===
- 20 May – Australian Guantanamo Bay detainee David Matthew Hicks returns to Australia, where he will serve the remaining seven months of his sentence at Adelaide's Yatala Labour Prison.

=== June ===
- 1 June – The Australian Government climate task force releases its report, recommending Australia implement an emissions trading scheme by 2012. Prime Minister John Howard declines to set a target for greenhouse gas reduction until after the 2007 election.
- 5 June – Eleven people are killed, 12 seriously injured, 50 others wounded and 13 still missing after a V/Line train collides with a truck at a level crossing near Kerang, Victoria.
- 6 June – Fugitive Tony Mokbel is recaptured in Greece after being missing since March 2006.
- 8–10 June – Major storms strike New South Wales, killing at least nine people and causing major flooding. The coal freighter Pasha Bulker is forced to run aground on Nobby's Beach, a major Newcastle beach.
- 18 June – Victoria Police cordon off a large part of the Melbourne central business district after a gunman shoots three people, killing one, and then escapes.
- 21 June – After the release of a report into child abuse and domestic violence in indigenous communities, the Prime Minister declares the situation a "national emergency" and announces a series of measures (most of which are controversial) to deal with the crisis.
- 25 June – John Laws announces his retirement from radio after a career spanning 54 years.

=== July ===
- 2 July – The Pasha Bulker is refloated after 25 days aground.
- 2 July – Thai Airways International flight TG999 arrives in Melbourne from Bangkok, causing a health scare when one of the passengers is later diagnosed with polio.
- 3 July – Wesfarmers announces a A$22 billion takeover of the Coles Group in the nation's largest ever corporate takeover.
- 3 July – Dr. Mohamed Haneef is arrested at Brisbane Airport on suspicion of being involved in the 2007 Glasgow International Airport attack.
- 7 July – Sydney Football Stadium in Sydney hosts one of seven global legs of the Live Earth concert series, which aim to promote action on climate change.
- 14 July – Dr. Mohamed Haneef is charged with providing support to a terrorist organisation, after it is alleged that he "recklessly" provided his mobile phone SIM card to the group responsible for the 2007 Glasgow International Airport attack.
- 27 July – Steve Bracks resigns as Premier of Victoria. Deputy Premier John Thwaites also resigns.
- 27 July – The Director of Public Prosecutions drops the terrorism support charges against Dr. Mohamed Haneef.
- 30 July – John Brumby and Rob Hulls are elected unopposed as Premier and Deputy Premier of Victoria respectively, following the sudden resignation of Steve Bracks and John Thwaites.

=== August ===
- 14 August – The federal Cabinet approves uranium exports to India outside the Nuclear Non-Proliferation Treaty.
- 15 August – Three journalists (Paul Daley and Michael Brissenden of the ABC, and Tony Wright of The Age and previously The Bulletin) give details of a dinner they attended in 2005 with Treasurer Peter Costello, at which Costello outlined his intention to challenge Prime Minister John Howard for the leadership of the Liberal Party.
- 19 August – Leader of the Opposition Kevin Rudd admits that he once visited New York strip club Scores in 2003.
- 21 August – The Federal Court of Australia reverses the decision of Immigration Minister Kevin Andrews to cancel the visa of former terrorism suspect Dr. Mohamed Haneef on character grounds, although the Australian Government announces it will appeal the decision.
- 27 August – The Australian Government releases a draft booklet of Australian facts and values from which 20 questions of a citizenship test will be drawn. Applicants for citizenship will be required to score 12 out of 20 (60%) in the test to be eligible.

=== September ===
- 2–9 September – The Asia-Pacific Economic Cooperation hosts its annual leaders meeting in Sydney. A public holiday was held in the Sydney Metropolitan area on 7 September.
- 10 September – Peter Beattie announces he will resign as Premier of Queensland
- 11 September – Canadian prime minister Stephen Harper became the first Canadian prime minister, since Canadian Confederation, to address the Parliament of Australia.
- 13 September – Anna Bligh is sworn in as Queensland's first female premier.
- 15 September – A three-year-old toddler, Qian Xun Xue (nicknamed "Pumpkin" by authorities), is found wandering alone at Melbourne's Southern Cross station. Police believe the child had arrived several days before from New Zealand, and that her father had fled to the United States.
- 22 September – The 171-year-old Myer building in Hobart is destroyed by fire.
- 26 September - Sudanese-Australian Liep Gony is murdered in a racist attack in Melbourne. Although it would later emerge that Gony was murdered by two white Australians, the media and politicians connect the murder to supposed African Gangs, and stricter controls on immigration from Sudan are implemented.

=== October ===
- 4 October – The controversial Gunns Bell Bay Pulp Mill is given the go-ahead by federal Environment and Water Resources Minister Malcolm Turnbull, with some conditions imposed on its development and with the Shadow minister for Environment and Water's backing.
- 8–11 October – Severe thunderstorms have pounded South-East Queensland and Northern New South Wales, with hailstones the size of tennis balls and destructive winds being recorded in Brisbane, Sunshine Coast, Gold Coast and Lismore.

=== November ===
- 6 November – An Australian children's toy known as Bindeez is recalled and a safety warning is issued after several children who had swallowed the beads were hospitalised suffering the symptoms of ingestion of gamma-Hydroxybutyric acid or GHB. The toys are also recalled in the United States and United Kingdom after several U.S. children suffer the same effects.
- 9 November – The Assistant Commissioner of Victoria Police, Noel Ashby, resigns, after a long service.
- 21 November – Three days before the federal election, members of the Liberal Party are caught letterboxing the electorate of Lindsay with pamphlets from a bogus Islamic organisation, praising Labor for its support of the Bali bombers. Jackie Kelly, the retiring member for Lindsay whose husband was involved in the scandal, dismissed the incident as a "Chaser-style prank."
- 24 November – A federal election is held. Kevin Rudd is elected as Prime Minister of Australia after the Australian Labor Party wins a majority in the House of Representatives.
- 25 November – Peter Costello indicates he will not run for either Leader or Deputy Leader of the Liberal Party following their electoral defeat.
- 26 November – Clare Martin announces her resignation as Chief Minister of the Northern Territory. Paul Henderson, the Territory's education minister is sworn in as her replacement on the same day.
- 29 November – Brendan Nelson is elected Liberal Leader by 45 votes to 42 over Malcolm Turnbull. Julie Bishop is elected Deputy Leader.

=== December ===
- 3 December – On his first day as Prime Minister, Kevin Rudd ratifies the Kyoto Protocol on climate change.
- 11 December – Julia Gillard becomes Acting Prime Minister as Kevin Rudd attends the 2007 United Nations Climate Change Conference in Bali, technically making her Australia's first female prime minister.
- 13 December – Zed Seselja becomes Opposition Leader of the ACT after the resignation of Bill Stefaniak. This follows the expulsion from the party of former Shadow Treasurer Richard Mulcahy on 10 December.
- 21 December – The Federal Court upholds the ruling of Justice Spender that former immigration minister Kevin Andrews was wrong to revoke the visa of Indian doctor and terrorism suspect Muhamed Haneef.

=== Date unknown ===
- Polygreen, an eco-friendly dwelling is constructed in Northcote, Victoria.

== Arts and literature ==
- 1 March – John Beard wins the 2007 Archibald Prize for his portrait of fellow artist Janet Laurence.
- 13 April – Australian author Peter Carey is announced as one of 15 finalists for the 2007 Man Booker Prize.
- 5 June – Australian crime writer Peter Temple wins the prestigious Duncan Lawrie Dagger Award for his novel The Broken Shore.
- 21 June – Carpentaria by Alexis Wright is announced as the winner of the Miles Franklin Literary Award
- Alexis Wright is awarded the Australian Literature Society Gold Medal for Carpentaria.
- Peter Carey's novel Theft: A Love Story wins the Christina Stead Prize for fiction.
- Alexis Wright's novel Carpentaria wins the Vance Palmer Prize for Fiction.

== Film ==
- 23 January – The Australian film Clubland is picked up by a US distributor at the Sundance Film Festival.
- 25 February – The Australian animated film Happy Feet, directed by George Miller, wins the Academy Award for Best Animated Feature.
- 26 March – The documentary Bra Boys became Australia's highest-grossing non-IMAX documentary.
- 30 April – Filming begins in Sydney on Baz Luhrmann's epic World War II drama Australia, starring Nicole Kidman and Hugh Jackman.

== Television ==
- 29 January – Former Who Wants to Be a Millionaire? host and CEO of the Nine Network, Eddie McGuire, returns to screens as the host of Nine's new game show 1 vs. 100. Also debuting on the same night, but at a different time, is the Seven Network's big money game show The Rich List.
- 9 February – The Australian Football League signs a five-year broadcasting contract with the Seven Network, Network Ten and pay TV provider Foxtel, in a controversial deal that will see half of the AFL matches played each week broadcast on Foxtel instead of free-to-air television.
- 12 February – Jodi Power, a family friend of convicted drug smuggler Schapelle Corby, made allegations in a paid interview on Channel Seven's Today Tonight that Corby's sister Mercedes had previously asked Power to transport drugs to Bali and that Mercedes had confessed to smuggling compressed cannabis concealed inside her body into Indonesia. Mercedes is interviewed by Channel Nine's rival program A Current Affair on 14 February.
- 1 April – When it was announced on Weekend Sunrise, The Seven Network pays $3 million for the broadcast rights to the fourth series of Kath & Kim, a popular sitcom which had previously aired until their final appearance on the ABC in 2005/06 as Da Kath & Kim Code.
- 16 April – Australia's Leader of the Opposition Kevin Rudd and Minister for Workplace Relations Joe Hockey discontinue their weekly appearances on Seven's breakfast news program Sunrise after four years. The decision follows possibly politically damaging accusations that Sunrise had requested that Rudd appear at a dawn service for ANZAC Day in Long Tan, Vietnam, with the service held an hour early to accommodate the time difference for live television.
- 18 May – After a tumultuous 15-month reign, the CEO of the Nine Network, Eddie McGuire, resigns.
- 1 June – The very last ever episode of Bert's Family Feud goes to air on the Nine Network after an 18-month run. The show was axed due to the strong competition prize win of rival Seven Network game show Deal or No Deal.
- 22 June – Mornings with Kerri-Anne is axed by WIN. Only Nine or NBN will continue the show. Mornings with Kerri-Anne is replaced by Susie a talk show with Susie Elelman in Wollongong debuted on 25 June, just one week after Seven's The Morning Show introduced. The Morning Show will definitely be hosted by Larry Emdur and Kylie Gillies.
- 5 July – High-budget drama series Sea Patrol makes its debut on the Nine Network.
- 23 July – Top-rating soap opera Neighbours makes a super international revamp over to continue its long-run on the Network Ten.
- 19 August – Fourth series premiere of Kath & Kim at 7:30 pm, now on the Seven Network, attracts an audience of 2.521 million nationally, making it the most watched television programme so far in 2007 and the highest rating ever for a first episode in the history of Australian television.
- 6 September – Julian Morrow and Chas Licciardello from The Chaser's War on Everything along with nine other production crew members are arrested in Sydney during the APEC summit for entering a restricted area. Those arrested were travelling in a fake Canadian motorcade and Licciardello was dressed up as Osama bin Laden.
- 15 October – Seven HD is introduced, becoming the first HD-only channel operated by a Melbourne-based commercial television network.
- 21 October – The Nine Network includes the "worm" audience reaction graph in their broadcast of the election debate between John Howard and Kevin Rudd, despite agreements to the contrary. The National Press Club cut Nine's transmission feed, and the ABC cut their backup feed. Nine continued to transmit by adding the worm to the Sky News broadcast.
- 2 November – Network Ten's news anchorperson Charmaine Dragun is found dead near Sydney, apparently due to a suicide.
- 25 November – Natalie Gauci is based only on Sony BMG after taking out the title as Australian Idol.
- 30 November – Daryl Somers quits the-highest rating Seven's Saturday Night Fever styled-reality show Dancing with the Stars.
- 16 December – Ten HD launches.

== Sport ==
- 1 January – Cricketer Justin Langer announces his retirement from Test cricket following the 2006–07 Ashes series, after similar announcements from teammates Shane Warne and Glenn McGrath.
- 5 January – Australia wins the Fifth Ashes Test against by 10 wickets at the SCG in Sydney – achieving a 5–0 "whitewash" of every Test in the series for the first time in 86 years.
- 18 February – Season premiers Melbourne Victory FC win the second A-League association football grand final at Docklands Stadium in Melbourne, beating Adelaide United 6–0, with Archie Thompson scoring 5 goals.
- 23 February – Reigning NRL premiers the Brisbane Broncos are defeated by Super League XI champions St. Helens R.F.C. in the 2007 World Club Challenge.
- 1 March – Jockey Chris Munce is sentenced to 30 months imprisonment in Hong Kong for taking bribes in exchange for racing tips. His lawyers are appealing.
- 4 March – Troy Bayliss and British rider James Toseland each take a race win at the 2007 Australian Superbike World Championship round at Phillip Island.
- 9 March – Brisbane Bullets clinch their first title in twenty years by defeating Melbourne Tigers 103–94 in Game 4 of the NBL Grand Final series.
- 10 March – Motorcycle racer Casey Stoner wins the first grand prix of the MotoGP season and the first ever 800cc grand prix, beating world champion Valentino Rossi at the Losail International Circuit in Qatar.
- 17 March – The Carlton Blues win the 2007 NAB Cup, the pre-season competition of the Australian Football League, beating the Brisbane Lions.
- 18 March – Kimi Räikkönen wins the 2007 Australian Grand Prix for the Scuderia Ferrari team.
- 18 March – The Gold Coast Titans play their first ever match against the St George Illawarra Dragons at Suncorp Stadium. They lose 20–18. Their first home game is against the Cronulla Sharks one week later.
- 18 March – 1 April – The 2007 World Aquatics Championships were held in Melbourne.
- 20 March – West Coast Eagles midfielder Ben Cousins is suspended indefinitely by his club after missing two days of training in a row. He later attends a four-week rehabilitation clinic in the United States.
- 23 March – Tasmania wins the Pura Cup cricket competition for the first time, beating New South Wales by 421 runs at Bellerive Oval in Hobart.
- 31 March – Retired swimmer Ian Thorpe is accused in French sports newspaper L'Equipe of having tested positive for abnormal levels of testosterone in May 2006. FINA demands an investigation into the allegations, which Thorpe denies. Thorpe is eventually found to have no case to answer
- 8 April – Will Power becomes the first Australian to win a Champ Car race after taking victory at the opening round of the season at the Vegas Grand Prix in Las Vegas.
- 10 April – Rugby league legend Andrew Johns announces his retirement following a neck injury.
- 15 April – Australian cyclist Stuart O'Grady wins the Paris–Roubaix Classic.
- 28 April – Australia wins the 2007 Cricket World Cup in the West Indies, beating Sri Lanka by 53 runs.
- 23 May – Queensland defeat New South Wales 25–18 in the first State of Origin match in the 2007 series.
- 7–29 July – The 2007 AFC Asian Cup football (soccer) tournament takes place in Indonesia, Malaysia, Thailand, and Vietnam. The Socceroos took part for the first time since joining the AFC in 2006. The Socceroos were drawn in Group A with Thailand, Iraq and Oman. They successfully reached the quarter finals, but were defeated by Japan in a penalty shootout.
- 21 July – Ben Cousins makes his AFL comeback for the Eagles against rivals the Sydney Swans.
- 23 July – Denis Pagan is sacked as the coach of Carlton Football Club.
- 25 July – After 26 years as Essendon coach, it is announced that the contract of Kevin Sheedy will not be renewed at the end of the season.
- 29 July – Australian cyclist Cadel Evans comes second in the final standings of the 2007 Tour de France.
- 23 August – A horse is diagnosed with horse flu (equine influenza) in a quarantine station at Eastern Creek. Further horses are diagnosed at the quarantine centre, Centennial Park and outside New South Wales over the next few days, resulting in the cancellation of race meetings Australia-wide and suspension of horse transportation for 72 hours on 25 August.
- 26 August – Melbourne Aussie rules fans farewell Essendon Football Club coach Kevin Sheedy and captain James Hird, as the Bombers are defeated by Richmond 17.17 (119) to 13.14 (92) at the MCG.
- 30 August – News Limited papers reveal that Andrew Johns was arrested in London for possessing ecstasy. He later admits to using recreational drugs throughout his career.
- 30 August – The 2007 Spring Racing Carnival at Randwick Racecourse is cancelled to the equine influenza outbreak.
- 30 August – Jana Rawlinson (née Pittman) wins the women's 400m hurdles at the 2007 World Championships in Athletics in Osaka, Japan.
- 1 September – Nathan Deakes wins the 50 km walk at the 2007 World Championships in Athletics in Osaka, Japan.
- 2 September – The Melbourne Storm win their second straight minor premiership following the final main round of the 2007 NRL season. Like the previous year, the win would later be revoked in 2010 following the club's salary cap breach. The Penrith Panthers finish in last position, claiming the wooden spoon.
- 23 September – Motorcycle racer Casey Stoner gains an unbeatable lead in the MotoGP world championships when he finished third in a race in Tokyo.
- 29 September – The Geelong Football Club (24.19.163) defeat Port Adelaide (6.8.44) to win the 111th VFL/AFL premiership. It is the first premiership since 1963 for the Cats, the first premiership won by a Victorian team since 2000 and the largest ever winning margin in VFL/AFL grand final history.
- 30 September – The Melbourne Storm defeat the Manly-Warringah Sea Eagles (34–8) at Stadium Australia, to win the 100th NSWRL/ARL/NRL premiership. The win would later be revoked in 2010 due to the Storm's salary cap breach.
- 6 October – England knock the Wallabies out of the quarter finals of the 2007 Rugby World Cup in France.
- 7 October – The 2007 Bathurst 1000 was won by defending champions Craig Lowndes and Jamie Whincup for Triple Eight Race Engineering ahead of two other Ford Falcons. It was the first Ford whitewash of the Bathurst podium since 1988.
- 14 October – New world champion, Casey Stoner took victory at the Australian MotoGP Grand Prix, at Phillip Island, the first Australian to win his home event since Mick Doohan in 1998.
- 21 October – Sébastien Bourdais becomes the first driver to win the Gold Coast Champ Car motor race twice with his victory at the 2007 Lexmark Indy 300.
- 27 October – El Segundo ridden by Luke Nolen wins the Cox Plate at Moonee Valley.
- 6 November – Efficient wins the 2007 Melbourne Cup.
- 17 November – Australia wins the 2007 Netball World Championships when the Aussies beat New Zealand's Silver Ferns (42–38) in Auckland.
- 19 November – Ben Cousins is banned from playing top-flight AFL for 12 months after being charged of bringing the game into disrepute.
- 21 November – The Olyroos football team qualify for the 2008 Beijing Olympics.
- 28 November – Sydney hosts the Asian Football Confederation awards.
- 2 December – Garth Tander wins the 2007 Dunlop Grand Finale, scoring enough points to overhaul Jamie Whincup to win the 2007 V8Supercar Championship Series at Phillip Island, his first series title, and the second successive title for the Toll HSV Dealer Team.
- 16 December – Craig Parry wins the Australian Open golf tournament.
- 28 December – Wild Oats XI achieves line honours for the third year running in the 2007 Sydney to Hobart Yacht Race. Rosebud is declared the handicap winner the following day.

== Births ==
- 3 May – Timothy Baker, Indonesian footballer
- 16 August – Jacob Thang, Burmese footballer
- 4 October – Zinadein Ardiansyah, Indonesian footballer
- 6 October – Lawrence Wong, Chinese footballer
- 12 November – Leonardo Puglisi, journalist

== Deaths ==
- 1 January – Leonard Fraser, 55, serial killer
- 2 January – A. Richard Newton, 55, electrical engineer and academic
- 4 January – Ben Gannon, 54, film producer
- 4 January – Ken Lorraway, 50, triple jumper
- 12 January – Sir James Killen, 81, Liberal politician
- 24 January – Harry Melbourne, 94, confectioner (inventor of Freddo Frog)
- 27 January – Trevor Allan, 30, rugby union player and commentator
- 9 February – Andrew McAuley, 39, kayak adventurer
- 13 February – Elizabeth Jolley, 83, author
- 28 February – Billy Thorpe, 60, musician
- 7 March – Morgan Mellish, 36, journalist
- 9 March – Ron Evans, 67, footballer and chairman of the AFL
- 11 March – Angela Webber, 52, comedian and writer
- 23 March – Damian McDonald, 34, Olympic cyclist
- 30 March – Basil Catterns, 89, WWII soldier
- 1 April – John Billings, 89, medical doctor
- 2 April – Jeannie Ferris, 66, Liberal senator
- 10 April – Kevin Crease, 70, South Australian newsreader
- 13 April – Joe Lane, 80, bebop jazz vocalist
- 15 April – Justine Saunders, 54, actress
- 17 April – Len Fitzgerald, 76, VFL/SANFL footballer
- 17 April – Bruce Haslingden, 84, Olympic cross-country skier
- 20 April – Audrey Fagan, 44, Chief Police Officer of the ACT
- 21 April – Lobby Loyde, 65, musician
- 13 May – Kate Webb, 64, war journalist
- 14 May – Aaron McMillan, 30, classical pianist
- 16 May – Allan Hird, Sr., 88, VFL footballer
- 20 May – Norman Von Nida, 93, golfer
- 21 May – Peter Hayes, 54, lawyer
- 24 May – Bill Johnston, 85, cricketer
- 27 May – Ron Archer, 73, Test cricketer
- 29 May – Norman Kaye, 80, actor
- 4 June – Tom Burns, 75, ALP politician
- 8 June – Lynne Randell, 57, 1960s pop singer
- 10 June – George Burarrwanga, 50, lead singer of the Warumpi Band
- 12 June – Frank Scarrabelotti, 109, Australia's oldest man
- 6 July – Eileen Wearne, 95, sprinter and Australia's oldest Olympic athlete
- 9 July – General John Baker, 71, former Chief of the Australian Defence Force (1995–1998)
- 11 July – Richard Franklin, 58, film director
- 11 July – Glenda Adams, 68, writer
- 12 July – Stan Zemanek, 60, radio broadcaster
- 16 July – Tom Brooks, 88, NSW cricketer and international umpire
- 22 July – Walter Jona, 81, Victorian politician
- 27 July – Leo "Lucky" Grills, 79, comedian and actor
- 27 July – Peter Moyes, 90, educator.
- 7 August – Wolfgang Sievers, 93, photographer
- 12 August – Ronald N. Bracewell, 86, physicist and radio astronomer
- 17 August – Tanja Liedtke, 30, dancer
- 8 September – Vincent Serventy, 91, writer and conservationist
- 13 September – Neville Jeffress, 87, advertising executive and founder of Media Monitors Australia
- 13 September – Clare Oliver, 26, cancer activist
- 18 September – Len Thompson, 60, Collingwood VFL player
- 21 September – Bob Collins, 61, former ALP senator
- 29 September – Lois Maxwell, 80, Canadian actress who played Miss Moneypenny in the early James Bond films, spent later years of her life in Perth.
- 1 October – Chris Mainwaring, 41, West Coast Eagles AFL player
- 12 October – Kim Beazley Sr., 90, ALP politician and father of Kim Beazley
- 23 October – John Ilhan, 42, founder of Crazy John's mobile phones
- 27 October – Charles Batt, 86, Tasmanian politician
- 2 November – Charmaine Dragun, 29, Network Ten WA newsreader
- 3 November – Peter Andren, 61, Independent MP for Calare
- 6 November – George Grljusich, 68, sports announcer and commentator
- 25 November – Matt Price, 46, journalist and newspaper columnist
- 26 November – Noel Miller, 94, cricketer
- 27 November – Bernie Banton, 61, asbestos campaigner
- 1 December – Ken McGregor, 78, tennis champion
- 5 December – John Winter, 83, Olympic high jumper
- 10 December – Gordon Samuels, 84, Governor of New South Wales (1996–2001)
- 15 December – Clem Jones, 89, Lord Mayor of Brisbane (1961–1975)
- 20 December – Robbie Williams, 45, first Indigenous Australian to sit on the Brisbane City Council
- 21 December – Ken Lee, 75, founder of Bing Lee electronics superstores
- 22 December – Charles Court, 96, Premier of Western Australia (1974–1982)

== See also ==
- 2007 in Australian television
- List of Australian films of 2007
