= List of Ashes series =

List of Anglo-Australian cricket series

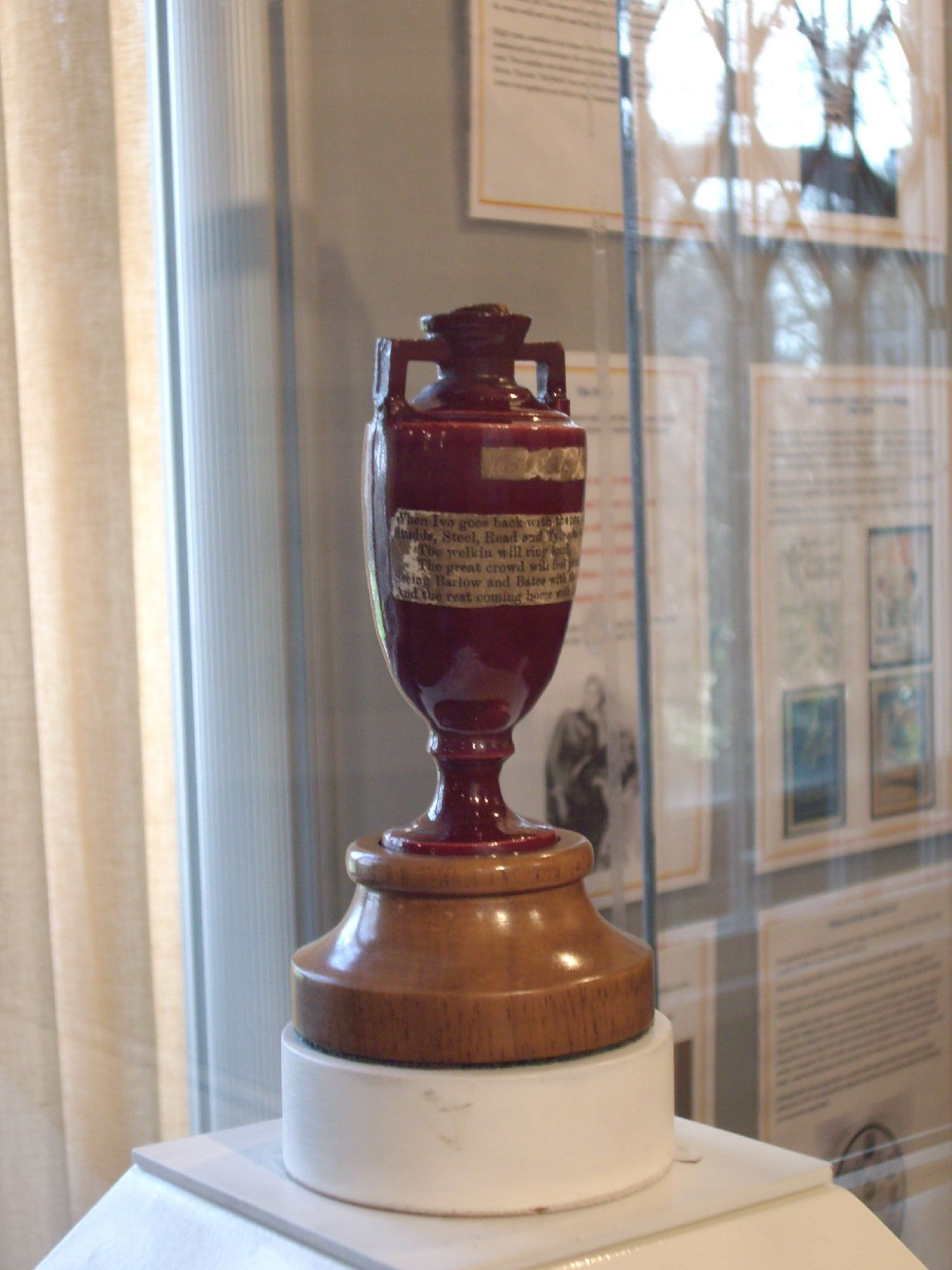
The Ashes urn, which remains at the MCC Museum at Lord's. A replica urn is presented to the winning captain.

The Ashes is a Test cricket series played between England and Australia. The series have varied in length, consisting of between one and seven Test matches, but since 1998 have been consistently five matches. It is the sport's most celebrated rivalry and dates back to 1882. It is generally played biennially, alternating between the United Kingdom and Australia. Australia are the current holders of the Ashes, having either won or drawn each series between 2017–18 and 2025–26.

== History ==
Although the first Test series played between England and Australia was in the 1876–77 season, the Ashes originated from the solitary Test which the two nations contested in 1882. England lost the match, played at The Oval, and a mock obituary was posted in The Sporting Times, declaring the death of English cricket. It stated that: "The body will be cremated and the ashes taken to Australia." Ivo Bligh adopted the term and, as captain of the English party that travelled to Australia the following winter, promised to bring the "Ashes" home.

After their loss to Australia in 1882, England won the next eight series between the two sides, during which time they lost only four of the 22 Tests. Australia won an Ashes series for the first time in 1891–92, when they beat England 2–1. The 1932–33 tour was known as the "Bodyline series" as, in response to the talented Australian batsman Don Bradman, England developed a tactic of bowling quickly at the body of the batsmen with most of the fielders placed in a close ring on the leg side. England won the series, but the tactic prompted changes to the laws of cricket, and the Australians, buoyed by the batting of Bradman, regained the Ashes during the next series and then held them for six series, spanning nineteen years. It was during this period that the Australians travelled to England in 1948, and remained unbeaten during the whole tour, gaining the nickname of "The Invincibles". In addition to winning the five match Test series 4–0, Australia won or drew all of its 29 other matches against county and representative sides.

Since 1882, only one series has been played between the two sides that was not deemed an Ashes series, that being the three Test series in the Australian summer of 1979–80, won by Australia 3–0. This was the first Australian home Test series with a unified team after two summers of World Series Cricket and was not deemed an Ashes series as England had retained the Ashes 5–1 on Australian soil 12 months earlier. On three other occasions, a one-off commemorative Test match was played in which the Ashes were not at stake, which were the 1977 Melbourne Centenary Test, the 1980 Lords Centenary Test and the 1988 Bicentennial Test played at the Sydney Cricket Ground in January 1988.

=== Series records ===
Australia has won more Ashes Tests than England, winning 140 of the 340 matches, compared to England's 108 victories. Australia also holds the edge in Ashes series won, having won on 34 occasions compared to England's 32. There have been seven drawn series, and on six of these occasions, Australia has retained the Ashes due to being holders going into the series. England has retained the Ashes after a drawn series once.

On three occasions has a team won all the Tests in an Ashes series; only Australia has achieved the feat 5–0 in 1920–21, 2006–07 and 2013–14. England's largest winning margin in an Ashes series was in 1978–79, when it won 5–1. England's largest unbeaten winning margin of 3–0 in an Ashes series was achieved in 1886, 1977 and 2013.

Both England and Australia have held the Ashes for a record eight consecutive series, England doing so between 1882–83 and 1890, while Australia achieved the feat from 1989 to 2002–03.

== Key ==
- Years denotes the cricket season in which the series takes place.
- Host denotes the host country for the series.
- First match denotes the date on which the first match of the series commenced.
- Tests denotes how many Tests were played in the series, and in parentheses (if different) the number of Tests that were scheduled to be played in the series.
- Australia denotes how many matches in the series were won by Australia.
- England denotes how many matches in the series were won by England.
- Drawn denotes how many matches in the series were drawn.
- Result denotes which side won the series overall, or if it was drawn.
- Holder denotes which side was awarded (or retained) the Ashes at the end of the series of the matches

== List of Ashes series ==
List of Ashes series
S	Years	Host	First match	T	Australia	England	D	Result	Holder	Ref.
1	1882–83	Australia	30 December 1882	3	1	2	0	England		
2	1884	England	11 July 1884	3	0	1	2	England		
3	1884–85	Australia	12 December 1884	5	2	3	0	England		
4	1886	England	5 July 1886	3	0	3	0	England		
5	1886–87	Australia	28 January 1887	2	0	2	0	England		
6	1887–88	Australia	10 February 1888	1	0	1	0	England		
7	1888	England	16 July 1888	3	1	2	0	England		
8	1890	England	21 July 1890	2 (3)	0	2	0	England		
9	1891–92	Australia	1 January 1892	3	2	1	0	Australia		
10	1893	England	17 July 1893	3	0	1	2	England		
11	1894–95	Australia	14 December 1894	5	2	3	0	England		
12	1896	England	22 June 1896	3	1	2	0	England		
13	1897–98	Australia	13 December 1897	5	4	1	0	Australia		
14	1899	England	1 June 1899	5	1	0	4	Australia		
15	1901–02	Australia	13 December 1901	5	4	1	0	Australia		
16	1902	England	29 May 1902	5	2	1	2	Australia		
17	1903–04	Australia	11 December 1903	5	2	3	0	England		
18	1905	England	29 May 1905	5	0	2	3	England		
19	1907–08	Australia	13 December 1907	5	4	1	0	Australia		
20	1909	England	27 May 1909	5	2	1	2	Australia		
21	1911–12	Australia	15 December 1911	5	1	4	0	England		
22	1912	England	27 May 1912	3	0	1	2	England		
23	1920–21	Australia	17 December 1920	5	5	0	0	Australia		
24	1921	England	28 May 1921	5	3	0	2	Australia		
25	1924–25	Australia	19 December 1924	5	4	1	0	Australia		
26	1926	England	12 June 1926	5	0	1	4	England		
27	1928–29	Australia	30 November 1928	5	1	4	0	England		
28	1930	England	13 June 1930	5	2	1	2	Australia		
29	1932–33	Australia	2 December 1932	5	1	4	0	England		
30	1934	England	8 June 1934	5	2	1	2	Australia		
31	1936–37	Australia	4 December 1936	5	3	2	0	Australia		
32	1938	England	10 June 1938	4 (5)	1	1	2	Drawn	Australia	
33	1946–47	Australia	29 November 1946	5	3	0	2	Australia		
34	1948	England	10 June 1948	5	4	0	1	Australia		
35	1950–51	Australia	1 December 1950	5	4	1	0	Australia		
36	1953	England	11 June 1953	5	0	1	4	England		
37	1954–55	Australia	26 November 1954	5	1	3	1	England		
38	1956	England	7 June 1956	5	1	2	2	England		
39	1958–59	Australia	5 December 1958	5	4	0	1	Australia		
40	1961	England	8 June 1961	5	2	1	2	Australia		
41	1962–63	Australia	30 November 1962	5	1	1	3	Drawn	Australia	
42	1964	England	4 June 1964	5	1	0	4	Australia		
43	1965–66	Australia	10 December 1965	5	1	1	3	Drawn	Australia	
44	1968	England	6 June 1968	5	1	1	3	Drawn	Australia	
45	1970–71	Australia	27 November 1970	6 (7)	0	2	4	England		
46	1972	England	8 June 1972	5	2	2	1	Drawn	England	
47	1974–75	Australia	29 November 1974	6	4	1	1	Australia		
48	1975	England	10 July 1975	4	1	0	3	Australia		
49	1977	England	16 June 1977	5	0	3	2	England		
50	1978–79	Australia	1 December 1978	6	1	5	0	England		
51	1981	England	18 June 1981	6	1	3	2	England		
52	1982–83	Australia	12 November 1982	5	2	1	2	Australia		
53	1985	England	13 June 1985	6	1	3	2	England		
54	1986–87	Australia	14 November 1986	5	1	2	2	England		
55	1989	England	8 June 1989	6	4	0	2	Australia		
56	1990–91	Australia	23 November 1990	5	3	0	2	Australia		
57	1993	England	3 June 1993	6	4	1	1	Australia		
58	1994–95	Australia	25 November 1994	5	3	1	1	Australia		
59	1997	England	5 June 1997	6	3	2	1	Australia		
60	1998–99	Australia	20 November 1998	5	3	1	1	Australia		
61	2001	England	5 July 2001	5	4	1	0	Australia		
62	2002–03	Australia	7 November 2002	5	4	1	0	Australia		
63	2005	England	21 July 2005	5	1	2	2	England		
64	2006–07	Australia	23 November 2006	5	5	0	0	Australia		
65	2009	England	8 July 2009	5	1	2	2	England		
66	2010–11	Australia	25 November 2010	5	1	3	1	England		
67	2013	England	10 July 2013	5	0	3	2	England		
68	2013–14	Australia	21 November 2013	5	5	0	0	Australia		
69	2015	England	8 July 2015	5	2	3	0	England		
70	2017–18	Australia	23 November 2017	5	4	0	1	Australia		
71	2019	England	1 August 2019	5	2	2	1	Drawn	Australia	
72	2021–22	Australia	8 December 2021	5	4	0	1	Australia		
73	2023	England	16 June 2023	5	2	2	1	Drawn	Australia	
74	2025–26	Australia	21 November 2025	5	4	1	0	Australia		

== Results ==
	Played	Won by Australia	Won by England	Drawn	Ref
Ashes Tests in Australia	177	94 (53.1%)	57 (32.2%)	26 (14.7%)	
Ashes Tests in England	173	52 (30.1%)	54 (31.2%)	67 (38.7%)	
All Ashes Tests	350	146 (41.7%)	111 (31.7%)	93 (26.6%)	
ALL Tests	366	156 (42.6%)	113 (30.9%)	97 (26.5%)	
Ashes Series in Australia	37	21 (56.8%)	14 (37.8%)	2 (5.4%)	
Ashes Series in England	37	14 (37.8%)	18 (48.6%)	5 (13.5%)	
All Ashes Series	74	35 (47.3%)	32 (43.2%)	7* (9.5%)	
As of 8 January 2026

*Ashes retained by Australia six times because of drawn series (1938; 1962-63; 1965-66; 1968; 2019 and 2023) and by England once (1972).
