= Bing Lee =

Australian consumer electronics retail company

- Type: Private
- Industry: Retail
- Founded: 1957; 69 years ago
- Headquarters: Old Guildford, New South Wales, Australia
- Number of locations: 31 stores (2026)
- Area served: Australia
- Key people: Bing Lee (Co-founder); Ken Lee (Co-founder); Lionel Lee (grandson, CEO)
- Website: binglee.com.au

Bing Lee is an Australian retailing company, a chain of superstores specializing in consumer electronics, as well as computer and telecommunication goods. It is the largest privately-held electrical retailing business in New South Wales, totaling 31 Bing Lee-branded stores alongside its new premium retail Signature Appliance showroom, as well as the subsidiary Miele Specialist store and the La Cornue showroom in Surry Hills.

Originally founded by Chinese immigrant Bing Lee and his son Ken, the business remains a family-run enterprise into a forth generation today.

Yenda Lee is the unofficial chairwoman of Bing Lee and one of its two board members, along with her son Lionel, its chief executive.

== History ==
The business began in 1957 when Bing Lee (Chinese: 李冰; pinyin: Lǐ Bīng) purchased an electrical repair business in Fairfield, New South Wales. Lee, along with his sons Ken Lee (Chinese: 李光裕; pinyin: Lǐ Guāngyù) and Cedric Lee, transformed the repair business into an electrical product retail and repair/installation business named Bing Lee Electronics (Chinese: 并力电器; pinyin: Bìng Lì Diànqì; lit. 'Combined Power Electrical Appliances'). (Note: Note that the name of the store and the founder are not the same. 并力电器 means "Bing Lee Electronics", where 并力 (bìng lì) literally means "combined power". That is the name of the store as displayed in Chinatown, Sydney. The actual name of the person, however, is surname 李 (lǐ), given name 冰 (bīng). Technically, it is not a homophone because the tones of the syllables are different.)

Initial growth came from the surge in demand for televisions, as well as a host of other household items like washing machines, cooking equipment, heaters and audio equipment. Bing Lee was a member of Retravision NSW for a number of years before leaving and joining the Narta Group. Bing Lee opened new stores in other Sydney suburbs and across New South Wales.

Of the Bing Lee retail outlets, 16 of the 40 are run by franchises after its introduction within the business in the early 2000s. Bing Lee also held the management rights to the "Sony Center" concept in NSW and the ACT, but later closed those stores.

Bing Lee died in 1987, and Ken Lee was appointed chairman. Ken Lee died of cancer on 21 December 2007. His eldest son, Lionel Lee, took over as chief executive of the company.

== Sponsorships ==
Bing Lee sponsors Sydney FC, Sydney Swans, and had sponsored the Canterbury Bulldogs (withdrew due to allegations of player involvement in sexual assaults).

They also sponsored Seven Network's The Amazing Race Australia.
