= Ken Lee (businessman) =

Chinese Australian businessman (1932–2007)

Ken Lee (Chinese: 李光裕; pinyin: Lǐ Guāngyù, 1 May 1932 – 21 December 2007) was a Chinese Australian businessman who co-founded the Bing Lee chain of electronic stores with his father, Bing Lee. He also served as the company's chairman from 1987 until 2007.

== Early life ==
Ken Lee was born in Yantai, Shandong, a poor rural area in China. In 1938, when Ken Lee was just seven, his father Bing left Yantai, putting him in charge of the family while he sailed to Australia seeking his fortune. When the Japanese invaded China there was widespread famine, and Ken was selling second-hand clothes and other goods on the streets to help feed his mother and sister. Once the war was over it took them three years to make their way to Sydney in 1948 and reunite with Bing.

Ken and his father, Bing Lee, opened their first Bing Lee store in Fairfield, New South Wales in 1957 as an electrical sales and repair store. Lee's first job at Bing Lee was as a repairman and salesman. He and his father built the Bing Lee chain from its first store into a multimillion-dollar retail business.

Bing Lee died in 1987, leaving his son, Ken Lee as sole owner and Ken remained Chairman of the Bing Lee company. By 1987, Bing Lee had expanded to 11 stores. There are now over 35 stores located throughout the Australian Capital Territory and New South Wales, as of 2007. The company now has over 700 employees. According to news reports, Ken Lee knew nearly all of his 700 employees by name.

== Personal life ==
Lee had a number of personal interests and hobbies. He was an avid golfer, snooker player, fisher and boater.

== Family ==
Lee was married to his wife, Yenda Lee, for 48 years, until his death. The couple had two sons, Lionel and Greg.

== Death ==
Ken Lee died on 21 December 2007, at St Vincent's Hospital, Sydney, aged 75, from cancer. He was survived by his wife, sons and six grandchildren. His elder son, Lionel Lee, succeeded as the head of the company.
