= Peter Hayes (lawyer) =

Australian lawyer (1948–2007)

Peter Ross Hayes, QC (30 October 1948 – 21 May 2007), was a prominent barrister in Melbourne, Australia. He was a director of the Melbourne Football Club from 2000 to 2003.

== Professional life ==
Hayes was admitted to the bar on 1 March 1973 and was appointed Queen's Counsel in 1988. He was a specialist in banking, finance and corporations law. Hayes was involved in a number of high-profile cases, including defending Steve Vizard's bookkeeper, Roy Hilliard, who was subsequently convicted of falsifying accounts, sentenced to three years imprisonment, and ordered by the Supreme Court of Victoria to repay over $2 million of misappropriated funds. Other work included defending suspects in the drug-related death of Dianne Brimble and counsel for Perth socialite Rose Porteous.

=== Allegations of drug use ===
In 2005, Hayes was subject to a professional complaint made by solicitor Isaac Brott to the Ethics Committee of the Victorian Bar. The solicitor, who worked with Hayes, asked that Mr Hayes be tested for drug use accused him of being an "inveterate cocaine user". The complaint was dismissed as vexatious and lacking in credibility.

== Death ==
Hayes died in the Royal Adelaide Hospital on 21 May 2007, 11 days after being found naked and unconscious in an Adelaide hotel room. He was discovered by Tony Sobey, whom Hayes was representing, as a victim of the Mercorella Ponzi Scheme in relation to claims against the liquidators. Two women visited Hayes in his hotel room on the night of his death, and were tracked down via hotel security footage. A 28-year-old woman described as a prostitute was charged with administering a drug of dependence to Hayes.

It was alleged that toxicology revealed he had ingested cocaine and heroin immediately before his death, and lethal drug overdose was the cause of death.

After Hayes' death, Victorian Bar Council chairman Michael Shand, QC, declined to comment on the original complaint of cocaine use, stating "the Bar Council is vigilant at maintaining the highest standards of practice at the bar" and would investigate the issues surrounding Hayes' death. When asked about drug use in the legal profession, Australian Government Solicitor-General David Bennett, QC, replied: "barristers as a group would use illegal drugs less than the general community because they are likely to be concerned about breaking the law".

== Personal life ==
He was survived by his former wife Mary, and children Sarah, William and Jane.
