= Frank Scarrabelotti =

Australian centenarian

Frank Scarrabelotti (4 August 1897 – 12 June 2007) was Australia's oldest man at the time of his death, aged 109 years and 312 days. Australia's oldest person at the time of his death was Myra Nicholson, who died later in 2007 aged 112.

Scarrabelotti was the son of Italian immigrants who arrived in Australia in 1880. He was born in Bungawalbin near Lismore, New South Wales.

Scarrabelotti lived in the Northern Rivers area of New South Wales for all of his life. He played rugby union for the Bangalow Royals and was a keen horseman participating in dressage events. He was one of the trustees of St Kevin's Catholic Church in Bangalow when it was built in the 1920s.

Scarrabelotti ran a dairy farm in Nashua before retiring to Bangalow in the 1960s.
