= Crazy John's =

Mobile phone retail chain in Australia

Mobileworld Operating Pty Ltd
- Trade name: Crazy John's
- Type: Subsidiary of VHA
- Industry: Telecommunications
- Founded: 1991
- Founder: John Ilhan
- Defunct: September 2014
- Fate: Integrated into Vodafone brand
- Headquarters: Port Melbourne, Victoria, Australia
- Area served: Australia
- Products: Mobile
- Number of employees: 400+ full-time (at its peak)
- Website: crazyjohns.com.au

Crazy John's was a mobile phone retail chain in Australia started by Turkish Australian businessman John Ilhan. Crazy John's was the largest independent phone retailer in Australia, employing more than 400 people with more than 600 retail stores. Following his death in 2007, Ilhan's widow Patricia sold her stake in the company to Vodafone Australia, now a part of TPG Telecom. Originally a dealer of Telstra Mobile, Crazy John's became a Mobile Virtual Network Operator through the Vodafone Australia network, dealing directly with customers and offering its own competitive mobile phone deals and plans.

== History ==
Crazy John's opened its first store in Brunswick, Victoria, in 1991. By 1998, there were fifteen store locations in Victoria, and the retailer was ranked in the top ten of Telstra's mobile dealers. As of January 2013 they had 61 stores.

The name Crazy John's came about through people constantly telling Ilhan his marketing ideas were "crazy", and the name stuck. Crazy John's came to prominence when it was the first company in Australia to offer $1 mobile phones.

Following the death of the company's founder John Ilhan in 2007, his wife sold her 75% share of the company to Vodafone in September 2008. Approximately 200 staff became redundant.

=== Closure ===
In January 2013 Vodafone announced that it was to close up to 40 of their Crazy John's-branded stores by 20 February as part of their cost-cutting restructuring, Vodafone's parent company Hutchison Telecoms Australia having had a A$131.3 million loss for the six months to 30 June 2012. The remaining 21 Crazy John's premises are to be re-branded as Vodafone Australia stores.

== Telstra legal disputes and defection ==
Crazy John's was originally a dealer for Telstra Mobile, Australia's largest mobile telecommunications provider, with 900,000 customers providing close to 10 percent of Telstra's mobile revenue.

In 2003, Telstra sent a letter by facsimile to Crazy John's demanding payment of A$21,283,642.61 it said was for the overpayment of trailing commissions, a percent of customers' phone bills. In the letter, Telstra hinted that, if the demand was not paid for, its contract as a Telstra dealer could be adversely affected. Crazy John's paid the $21 million, and immediately filed suit to demand it be refunded. Crazy John's claimed that Telstra's accounting system, MICA (Mobile Integrated Customer Accounts), used to bill its 8 million subscribers, was not able to provide the information required to produce an accurate bill and, therefore, support their payback demand.

Industry analysts believed that Telstra may have been wanting Crazy John's to take a cut to its trailing commission, suggesting that Telstra believed Crazy John's could not make the payment, and it might be willing to renegotiate its commission percentage in lieu. However, Crazy John's was able to make the payment, and the situation reversed: instead of financially forcing the dealer to negotiate, Telstra was in a position of being sued and required to justify its $21 million demand, which Crazy John's believed it could not do.

In May 2005, Telstra issued a second, $12 million demand, again for more alleged overpaid trailing commissions. Crazy John's applied for an injunction in the Federal Court in Melbourne to prevent Telstra from going ahead with this second demand. This was dismissed by Justice Mark Weinberg; Crazy John's paid the amount, and rolled the figure into its original refund demand, bringing the total to $33 million.

At the same time, company founder John Ilhan announced his intention to dump Telstra in 2007 when its contract expired, and instead would buy its own airtime from a wholesale source and serve customers directly, rather than passing them on to Telstra. Ilhan said he was "fed up with Telstra's bullying" and that it "isn't competitive any longer". Telstra, on the other hand, began threatening to not renew the exclusive reseller agreement it had with Crazy John's when it ended on 1 July 2007, if didn't agree to new terms that included less commission per customer. Telstra did just that, giving the required two years notice in July 2005.

After announcing his intention to defect from Telstra at the end of its contract, Telstra created a new company, BQ Communications, to compete against Crazy John's. In affidavits lodged in the Supreme Court of Victoria, Crazy John's claimed that Telstra was poaching Crazy John's staff to start up the company – including Bill Asermakidis, the former national sales manager – and "raping" its customer database by taking price lists and the names of customers. Telstra denied many of the claims made in the affidavits, but not the new company.

On 1 July 2007, Crazy John's made the transition towards becoming a Mobile Virtual Network Operator through the Vodafone network. The deal allowed Crazy John's to deal directly with mobile phone handset manufacturers and offer its own competitive mobile phone plans. Just days before the switch to Vodafone, Telstra sought a court injunction to prevent Crazy John's from using confidential information in contacting Telstra's customers to sign them up to new contracts. Crazy John's agreed to limit the amount of customer information it can use after its contract ended.

== Marketing and sponsorship ==
Crazy John's were a sponsor of the Collingwood Football Club.

In 2003, Crazy John's bid for the naming rights to Subiaco Oval, in Perth, Western Australia, but soon lost it due to community action.
