= Joe Lane (singer) =

Australian singer

Joe Lane (21 March 1927 – 13 April 2007) was an Australian Bebop jazz vocalist based in Sydney.

Born Keith Joseph Lane in Sydney, Australia, he first heard bebop whilst in the army in 1947. After leaving the army he studied with conductor and teacher of advanced harmony Roy Maling, and then introduced vocal bebop into Sydney clubs such as El Rocco, the Arabian, and the Mocambo. In 1949 he formed a vocal group with Ian Gunter, which worked at Sammy Lee's Club 47. He took on the stage name of Joe "Bebop" Lane.

In the 1950s Lane led the Dee Jays, which singer Johnny O'Keefe later took over, and managed to secure jamming sessions with visiting Americans, including members of the Lionel Hampton and Stan Kenton bands. He also worked on the Cool for Cats TV show in Melbourne.

1968 saw Lane moving to New Zealand where he established his own jazz club/workshop in Auckland, presenting concerts and master-classes on the bebop vocal style. Returning to Sydney in 1971 he continued working venues and festivals.

In the mid-1980s, he formed his own band Killer Joe, with drummer Dennis Sutherland, and later, The Jazz Cats, which had a residency at Sydney's Criterion Hotel. He also presented a 'history of jazz' show at The Basement in Sydney, which became legendary for the audience reactions it elicited.

Lane was given a feature role in Kevin Lucas's award-winning jazz film Beyond El Rocco and in the mid-1990s he released his CD album, The Arrival.

He was a headline artist in the Canberra Jazz Initiative in 1993, which was a month-long festival produced by students from the ANU School of Music Jazz Department. An established jazz artist was teamed up with the best student players for each of the twelve concerts.

In 2002, Lane featured as soloist with the Australian Art Orchestra, directed by Paul Grabowsky (with ten other jazz vocalists) at the Sydney Opera House in a concert for the Sydney Festival entitled Testimony – An Examination of the Life and Music of Charlie Parker.

Joe Lane spent his final years in a nursing home in Sydney's inner-west, following a stroke that left him unable to speak, although he was remarkably still able to sing, which he did whenever his many musician friends visited. He died there on 13 April 2007, aged 80.
