= John Ilhan =

Australian businessman (1965–2007)

- Born: Mustafa İlhan; 23 January 1965; Yozgat, Turkey
- Died: 23 October 2007 (aged 42); Brighton, Victoria, Australia
- Occupation: Businessman
- Known for: Founder of Crazy John's
- Children: 4

John Ilhan (born Mustafa İlhan; 23 January 1965 – 23 October 2007) was an Australian businessman. He was the founder of Crazy John's mobile phone retail chain and, in 2003, was the richest Australian under 40 years of age.

== Early life and career ==
Ilhan was born in 1965 in Yozgat, Turkey, and migrated to Australia with his family when he was five. He grew up in working-class Broadmeadows in Melbourne's north-west. Here he attended Jacana Primary School and then Broadmeadows High School. Whilst at Jacana Primary he played in the school football, soccer and basketball teams.

After just one year at university and a short time as a salesman at Ford, Ilhan took a sales job at the phone and electrical retailer Strathfield Car Radio. He left in 1991 to set up his own mobile-phone shop, right across the road from Strathfield's store in inner-city Brunswick. After expanding the business into Australia's biggest Telstra mobile dealership, with 18 stores in Victoria, Ilhan opened a handful of stores in Sydney, Brisbane and Adelaide.

== Personal life ==
Ilhan was a vocal supporter of the Richmond Football Club in the Australian Football League. He made bids for the board and even offered to buy out Terry Wallace's contract in a bid to improve the team's performance by recruiting Kevin Sheedy.

=== Wealth and philanthropy ===
Ilan was ranked first in Business Review Weekly's Australia's Young Rich List 2003, with a net worth of A$200 million. In the 2007 Rich List, he was assessed as the 126th-richest man in Australia with a net worth of A$310 million. Having a net worth of over A$300 million by the age of 40, Ilhan became inspired to become a philanthropist, and contribute a large percentage of his earnings to charity. Before his death at the age of 42 in 2007, he was recognised as one of the country's most generous philanthropists, having had provided regular donations to a wide range of charitable organisations.

In 2006 Ilhan founded the Ilhan Food Allergy Foundation. The Foundation is dedicated to promoting research and educating the public about the issues and causes surrounding anaphylaxis. He contributed A$1 million to establish the Ilhan Food Allergy Foundation, inspired by his daughter's severe allergy to peanuts.

During his lifetime, the Ilhan Food Allergy Foundation contributed towards the Richmond Football Club, Kids Under Cover, The Alfred Hospital Department of Allergy, Immunology and Respiratory Medicine, and Murdoch Children's Research Institute Allergy and Immune Disorders Research Group Department of Allergy and Immunology.

=== Death ===
Ilhan died of a suspected heart attack, during a morning walk in Brighton, Melbourne, on 23 October 2007, aged 42. An autopsy later revealed that he died of a hereditary heart condition. He was survived by his wife, Patricia, and four children. His final interview was broadcast on Today Tonight on the day before his death. A traditional Islamic funeral was held at the Broadmeadows Mosque on 26 October 2007. Among the approximately 3,000 mourners were Ahmed Fahour and Eddie McGuire.
