= Polygreen =

General information
- Location: Northcote

Polygreen is a small eco-friendly dwelling designed by the Melbourne-based architect duo Bellemo & Cat; the site is located in Northcote, Victoria, the building was completed in 2007. The design drew inspiration from the warehouse/container style of existing buildings which surrounded the site. The Architects have combined this industrial theme with a reference to one of their previous sculptural and graphical artworks.
Polygreen house is a low-maintenance architectural solution with much light and warmth, the house has four storeys including an office on the ground floor that is separated from the house by a garage and workshop.

== Location ==
The site on which Polygreen was built is down a narrow service lane filled with old industrial sheds. The construction of these types of buildings generally follow similar design parameters, as a result they share similar characteristics: most will be built with external walls placed as close to the block boundary as possible, and generally positioned right up against the street. This is done so as to achieve a maximum internal space with minimal external fuss. The list of building materials used in these types of buildings are also quite general, those that reflect the fast, cheap, and simple methods of construction; for example, construction using either a timber or steel frame, then covered with a lightweight cladding for internal and external surfaces.
The structure of Polygreen house can be described as part warehouse and part shipping container. It followed many of the traditional methods of construction conducive to these types of buildings, however the architects have refashioned this building typology by using a delicate translucent skin as the external surface of the building. This skin envelopes the internal space, although some permeations have been positioned on each side to allow natural light into the space.
Like those on neighboring blocks, Polygreen is built to the boundary as a means to maximise space on the small site (only 7 by 16 metres). The container building’s outer skin however is made of woven fibreglass. The fibreglass was then screen-printed in a pattern of varying shades of green. The fibreglass skin covers three of the elevations; it was deliberately peeled back from the northern side to be replaced with full-length double-awning glazing. This also made it possible for the making of an opening out onto an open-air deck. The deck is accessed over split levels, it is covered by an artificial turf and includes a slippery-slide for the architects’ small children.

== Main features ==
The structure is in essence an elongated box, consisting of two identical storeys. The ground floor is occupied by the studio (giving onto the street), garage, and children’s room. The remaining internal space is divided into several living spaces over the different levels. While the designers found it important to maintain an “open-style plan”, they have also incorporated “soft walls” made of woven felt materials to inform circulation in a subtle way. There are clearly identifiable living, dining and children’s play areas.
In general, the internal environment of Polygreen house seems to counteract the extreme simplicity of its exterior. Details seen in the casework, fittings and fixtures are all expressed with extreme sophistication. Wooden flooring floods each level and seamlessly transforms into broad steps where the levels interact. The house feels spacious despite its compactness.
An open plan kitchen, dining and living area are on the upper level and this space is overlooked by a partially screened loft bedroom. To the north are views of a Victorian roof-scape and distant mountains. Services for hydronic heating are tucked under the floors, while outside, room is also made for a water tank.

== Precedent work ==
The graphic image incorporated into the cladding refers to the architect’s previous work the “Cocoon” house in Wye River(link); this project had been recreated into a sculpture titled “2 Cocoon”, and transformed again after this into an abstract public art installation called “Polywarp”. The photographs of Polywarp are what have been edited digitally to then become the fibreglass skin cladding of “Polygreen”.

== Awards ==
Polygreen house won the Australian Institute of Architects(AIA) National Award for Small Project Architecture 2009 and the AIA Award for Residential Architecture Victorian chapter.
