= 2006–07 Ashes series =

- Part of the English cricket team in Australia in 2006–07
- The logo for the 2006–07 Ashes series
- Date: 23 November 2006 – 5 January 2007
- Location: Australia
- Result: Australia won the 5-Test series 5–0
- Player of the series: Compton–Miller Medal: Ricky Ponting (Aus)
Teams
- Australia: England
Captains
- Ricky Ponting: Andrew Flintoff
Most runs
- Ricky Ponting (576) Michael Hussey (458) Matthew Hayden (413): Kevin Pietersen (490); Paul Collingwood (433); Ian Bell (331)
Most wickets
- Stuart Clark (26) Shane Warne (23) Glenn McGrath (21): Matthew Hoggard (13); Andrew Flintoff (11); Monty Panesar (10)

The 2006–07 cricket series between Australia and England for The Ashes was played in Australia from 23 November 2006 to 5 January 2007. Australia won the series and regained the Ashes that had been lost to England in the 2005 series. The five Tests of the series were played at Brisbane, Adelaide, Perth, Melbourne and Sydney. In winning, Australia completed a 5–0 "whitewash", the first time this had happened in an Ashes series since 1920–21. The series was also notable for the retirement of four significant Australian players, namely Justin Langer, Damien Martyn, Shane Warne and Glenn McGrath. Ricky Ponting was named Player of the Series.

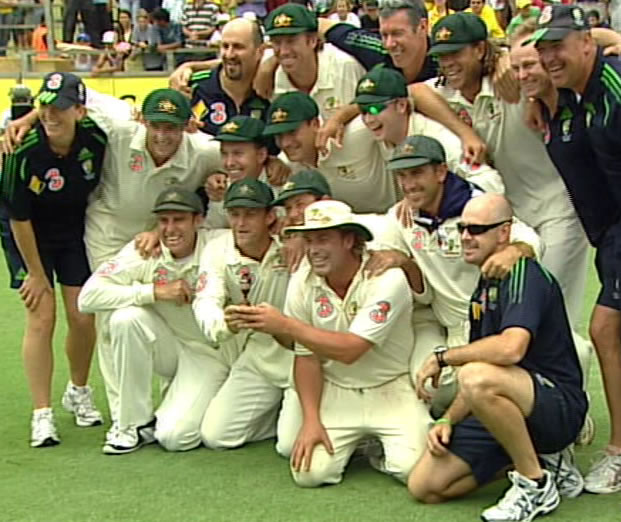
The Australian cricket team celebrate with a replica of The Ashes urn.

== Lead-up ==
Ricky Ponting found himself criticised by journalists on his captaincy and performances in the 2005 series during the run-up to the first Test. When questioned in a press conference on this subject, he said "We didn't perform the way we would have liked and probably I didn't score the runs I would have liked to during the Ashes ... It's important for us to move on, to move forward from that; that is me as a player, me as a captain and the rest of the team as well ... We have managed to do that very well, we've actually played better cricket as a result of that."

Andrew Flintoff, England's captain, called the series "the reason we play ... we are going over there to play in what could be the biggest series ever so there is an excited group of lads ... it is going to be tough. We know that 2005 was something special and whether that can be recreated I am not quite sure ... in England each Test match got bigger and bigger and we got a real feeling of what the Ashes was about."

The Sydney Morning Herald newspaper described the series as "the most anticipated Ashes series ever", and tickets were sold out within days of being available for all the games.

Bookmakers were heavily favouring an Australian series victory, with best odds, as at 10 November, being listed on one site as Australia 1–3 to win, England 11–2 to win, and the draw 9–1.

== Sale of tickets ==
Cricket Australia made the first tickets available on 1 June, selling only to the registered members of the Australian Cricket Family, who were able to register in the months before the ticket sale. 182,000 of 635,500 available tickets were sold on the first day and a number of buyers immediately put their tickets on eBay at inflated prices. Telephones and internet systems were delayed to such an extent that CA chief executive James Sutherland wrote a letter of apology to the Australian fans, but was still criticised by Brett Judd, the organiser of 1.5 million tickets for the 2006 Commonwealth Games. Judd called their approach "farcical".

On 19 June, the remainder of the tickets went for sale to the general public and were sold out within two hours. Cricket Australia later cancelled 1,300 tickets, which they believed had been sold on eBay at inflated prices, as the tickets had "breached conditions of sale".

On 29 December, Cricket Victoria had announced that an excess of 47,000 pre-purchased tickets for the fourth day of the Boxing Day Test were to be refunded, as a result of the Test reaching its conclusion on the third day. Despite the Test lasting only three days, bumper crowds over the duration of the Test ensured that sales had generated over A$8 million in takings.

== Squads ==
Both England and Australia went into the series with concerns about the fitness, form and availability of key players: Michael Vaughan, England's successful captain in the 2005 Ashes series, and Simon Jones, England's lowest-averaging bowler during the 2005 series, were unavailable due to injury. Australia selected Glenn McGrath for his first first-class match since he left the game in April for personal reasons. Other former Australian players such as Jason Gillespie were not selected.

The England squad for the tour of Australia was announced on 12 September 2006. Andrew Flintoff was selected over Andrew Strauss as the captain, in the absence of Michael Vaughan through injury. Marcus Trescothick left the squad on 14 November due to a "recurrence of a stress-related illness", after making 10 runs in two tour matches. Ed Joyce was called up as his replacement on 15 November. The Australian 13-man squad for the first Test was announced by Cricket Australia's National Selection Panel on 16 November 2006. Michael Clarke was called up on 18 November 2006 as cover for injury doubt Shane Watson.

On 8 December 2006, a week before the third Test, Damien Martyn announced he was retiring from all forms of cricket. Adam Voges and Andrew Symonds were called up to the squad to replace him.

On 16 December, Ashley Giles left the tour to be with his wife, who was diagnosed with a brain tumour. He was replaced by Jamie Dalrymple.

England	Australia
Andrew Flintoff (c); Andrew Strauss (vc); ~~Marcus Trescothick~~; Ed Joyce; Alastair Cook; Kevin Pietersen; Ian Bell; Paul Collingwood; Chris Read (wk); Sajid Mahmood; Steve Harmison; Matthew Hoggard; Monty Panesar; Geraint Jones (wk); ~~Ashley Giles~~; Jamie Dalrymple; James Anderson; Liam Plunkett	Ricky Ponting (c); Adam Gilchrist (vc, wk); Matthew Hayden; Justin Langer; Michael Hussey; Michael Clarke; ~~Damien Martyn~~; Adam Voges; Shane Watson; Andrew Symonds; Shane Warne; Stuart Clark; Mitchell Johnson; Brett Lee; Glenn McGrath; Shaun Tait

== Venues ==
As with other recent Ashes series in Australia, this series was played at the main cricket grounds in Australia's five largest cities.

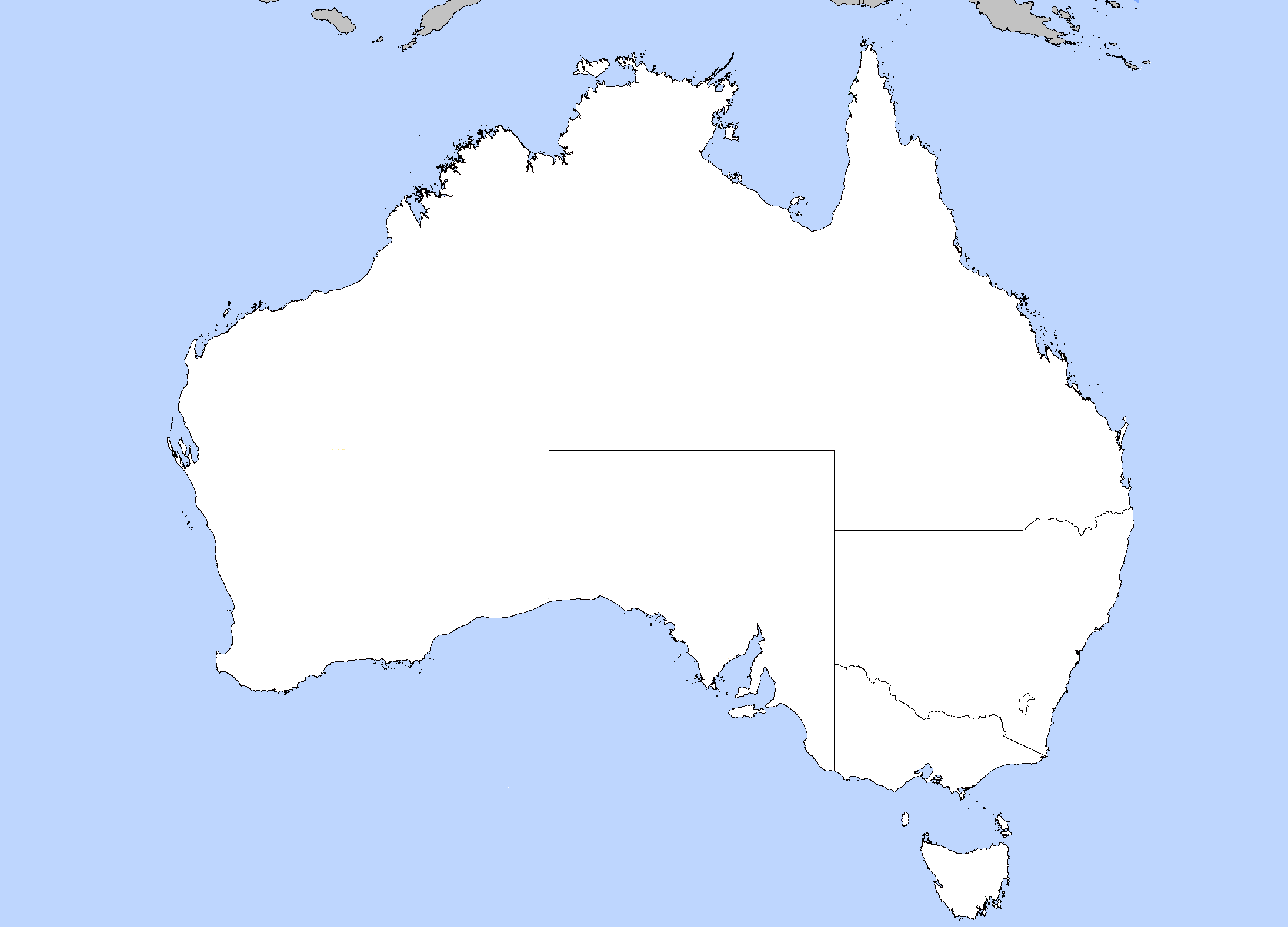

Test	Location	Stadium name	Capacity	Date
1	Brisbane	The Gabba	42,200	23–27 November
2	Adelaide	Adelaide Oval	53,000	1–5 December
3	Perth	WACA Ground	24,000	14–18 December
4	Melbourne	Melbourne Cricket Ground	100,000	26–30 December
5	Sydney	Sydney Cricket Ground	48,000	2–6 January

== Test series ==
=== First Test ===
23–27 November
Scorecard

Australia	v	England
602/9d (155 overs); Ricky Ponting 196 (319); Andrew Flintoff 4/99 (30 overs)		157 (61.1 overs); Ian Bell 50 (162); Glenn McGrath 6/50 (23.1 overs)
202/1d (45.1 overs); Justin Langer 100* (146)		370 (100.1 overs); Paul Collingwood 96 (155); Stuart Clark 4/72 (24.1 overs)

Australia won by 277 runs
The Gabba, Brisbane
Umpires: Billy Bowden (NZ) and Steve Bucknor (WI)
Player of the match: Ricky Ponting (Aus)

- Australia won the toss and elected to bat.

Day one

Australia won the toss after Andrew Flintoff called heads. Ricky Ponting elected to bat on a good looking pitch. Steve Harmison bowled the opening over, with the first ball a wide that went straight to Flintoff at second slip. Harmison only lasted two overs, which went for 17 runs, before being replaced by James Anderson. Anderson proved just as expensive as Harmison, conceding 10 runs in his first over in his first Test match for seven months. Flintoff got Matthew Hayden to edge one to second slip on 21. Australia reached lunch without further loss on 1/79.

In the afternoon, Flintoff unexpectedly removed Justin Langer, who had looked set for a century but holed out to Kevin Pietersen at cover point. Ashley Giles, bowling in his first first-class match for 12 months, took the wicket of Damien Martyn but was innocuous, if inexpensive (unlike many of his colleagues), claiming no more wickets during the day. Ponting and Michael Hussey survived the final session of the day to close at 3/346. During the session, Ponting passed 100 runs in a near-faultless display, offering up only one potential lbw shout (given not out by umpire Billy Bowden) when he missed a sweep on a straight ball from Giles. The century took him level with Steve Waugh as Australia's leading century-maker, with 32 each. England's bowling was generally criticised, most notably Harmison, who was given only 12 overs out of the 90 overs bowled during the day. Andrew Flintoff was the only bowler to finish the day with his reputation enhanced, having been England's cheapest and most effective bowler. The pitch, however, was flat and not conducive to either pace or spin bowling and as England failed to use the new ball well at both the beginning and end of the day, it proved to be one of the most frustrating days in the field English cricket had endured in modern Ashes series.

Day two

Australia continued their dominance throughout the second day. Ponting and Hussey continued their partnership, putting together 209. Flintoff finally took Hussey's wicket when he was on 86, bowled through the gate, with the off-stump out of the ground, when he had looked set for a century. Matthew Hoggard finally made a significant breakthrough in the afternoon, taking the wickets of Ponting (for 196) and Adam Gilchrist (for a duck) in the same over, both men out lbw. Gilchrist, in particular, was out to a ball bowled from around the wicket from the right-arm bowler Hoggard, a continuation of England's tactics against him in the 2005 Ashes series, which had restricted him to a top score of 49*. Ponting's 196 allowed him to surpass Graham Gooch as the seventh highest Test run scorer of all time (Gooch scored 8,900 runs). Michael Clarke crafted a solid 56 before falling to Anderson, edging a good delivery to slip. Australia's tail wagged, with Brett Lee scoring 43 and Stuart Clark hitting a quick-fire 39 off 23 balls before having his leg stump knocked out of the ground by Flintoff. His innings included two huge sixes off the bowling of Anderson, who ended the innings with figures of 141 runs for just one wicket. Australia were able to declare their innings with the score 9/602 after tea.

England had to negotiate the 17 overs remaining in the evening. After a reasonably solid start, England lost Andrew Strauss and Alastair Cook in consecutive balls to Glenn McGrath. Strauss was lambasted for his dismissal, top-edging a pull on a ball too full to be suitable for the shot. Clark removed Paul Collingwood, edging an off-cutter to Gilchrist. This dismissal left England on 3/53 at the close, leaving England in a perilous position, Australia having reached a total more than 200 runs higher in any Test of the 2005 Ashes series before taking three cheap wickets before the close. Ian Bell and Pietersen were the not out batsmen, with scores of 13 and 6 respectively.

Day three

Matters continued badly for England on day three and they ended their first innings on 157 all out just after lunch, 246 short of their follow-on target of 403. Bell was the only England batsman to offer any real resistance, spending nearly four hours at the crease before being dismissed by Clark for 50. It was a personal triumph for Bell, who had averaged just 17.10 in the 2005 series, looking particularly vulnerable against McGrath and Shane Warne. England's other specialist batsman, Pietersen, was out for only 16, trapped lbw to a ball from McGrath to which he did not offer a stroke. All-rounder and captain Flintoff was out for a duck, caught behind off what replays suggested was a no-ball (not spotted by umpire Steve Bucknor) from Brett Lee. Brief resistance also came from wicketkeeper Geraint Jones and spinner Giles, who made 19 and a quickfire 24 respectively, but both were out to McGrath. In total, McGrath took six wickets for only 50 runs conceded, a powerful response to critics who had suggested that he was, at 36, too old to be a front-line bowler in an Ashes series.

Ponting chose not to enforce the follow-on and put his team back in to bat, a decision which surprised the majority of spectators and media personnel. Australia's lead of 445 going into the second innings was one of the largest ever held by a team which had then decided not to enforce the follow-on. This decision was in contrast to Michael Vaughan's decision in the 4th Test of the 2005 series, where he had enforced the follow-on with Australia just 259 runs behind. As on the opening day, England's bowling attack was again barely able to penetrate Australia's defences, and the home side were able to end the day on 1/181, the only loss being Hayden who was run out on 37 by Anderson while attempting a risky second run. Langer and Ponting ended the day unbeaten, with Langer on 88, and Ponting on 51 having scored his 9,000th Test run during the innings. The day was the third in a row which had gone badly for England and with the pitch showing wide cracks, offering encouragement to Warne in particular, an Australian victory was widely expected at the close of play.

Day four

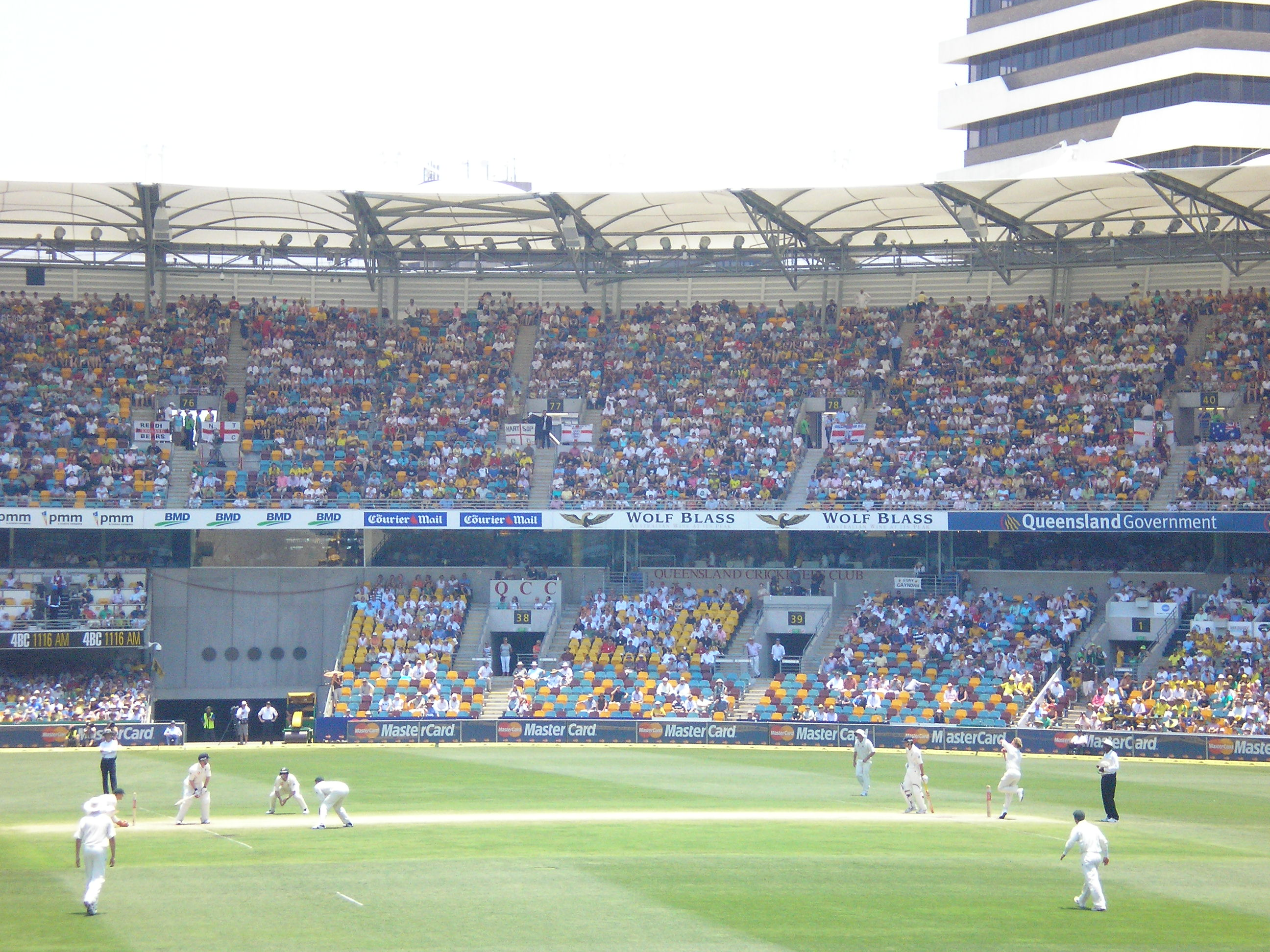
Shane Warne bowling to Ian Bell on day four.

Australia continued to build a formidable lead, eventually declaring at 1/202, a lead of 647, just after Langer had passed his century, his 23rd in Test cricket. Langer ended on 100 not out while Ponting had progressed to 60. Towards the end of Australia's second innings Ponting suffered a back strain, and did not return to the field after his side's declaration.

England began their second innings shakily, with Strauss out for 11 off Clark in a similar fashion to his first innings dismissal, this time hooking the ball to fine leg, the dismissal owing more to poor execution than the poor shot selection witnessed in England's first innings. Warne dismissed Cook for an industrious 43, caught by Hussey off his pads, and Bell for a duck, lbw to a slider, leaving England struggling at 3/91. Collingwood and Pietersen then rebuilt their team's innings in the second session, sharing a 153 run partnership. Collingwood was eventually stumped for 96 off the bowling of Warne, charging down the pitch while looking to reach his third Test century, and his first against Australia, and missing his shot by nearly six inches. Flintoff soon followed after scoring 16 runs, perishing to an ill-judged pull shot off the bowling of Warne. Pietersen and Jones were the not out batsmen at the end of the day, with 92 and 12 runs respectively, with England needing a further 355 for victory. Pietersen's innings was notable because of the manner in which he had suppressed legendary leg spinner Warne.

At one point at the end of a delivery, Warne picked up the ball and threw it to Gilchrist behind stumps albeit badly. The ball veered and headed to Pietersen, who was forced to defend himself with a reflexive hookshot. He could be seen mouthing the words, "Fuck off!" on conclusion of the stroke. The fourth day was a break from the norm of the Brisbane Test, which until then had gone entirely in Australia's favour. The partnership between Collingwood and Pietersen was the first of any substance in the Test for England and allowed some hope of an unlikely draw, with reports from some sources of an approaching storm.

Day five

England's chances of lasting the day were effectively dashed after Pietersen flicked the ball to Damien Martyn at short midwicket off Brett Lee in the first over of the day, immediately after Australia's taking the new ball and without adding to his overnight score. Jones struck a few boundaries but edged onto his stumps off McGrath. Fellow NSW paceman Clark took the final wickets of Giles (caught at first slip), Hoggard (caught at first slip) and Harmison (caught pulling at fine leg), with England lasting only 20 overs for the day. England's fourth innings total of 370 was the highest ever achieved in a fourth innings of a Test match at the Gabba but was still nowhere near the total set by Australia. Australia won the match by 277 runs, with Ponting named man of the match for his 196 and 60 not out. The total attendance was recorded as 164,747 for the match.

=== Second Test ===
1–5 December
Scorecard

England	v	Australia
551/6d (168 overs); Paul Collingwood 206 (392); Stuart Clark 3/75 (34 overs)		513 (165.3 overs); Ricky Ponting 142 (245); Matthew Hoggard 7/109 (42 overs)
129 (73 overs); Andrew Strauss 34 (79); Shane Warne 4/49 (32 overs)		168/4 (32.5 overs); Michael Hussey 61* (66); Andrew Flintoff 2/44 (9 overs)

Australia won by 6 wickets
Adelaide Oval, Adelaide
Umpires: Steve Bucknor (WI) and Rudi Koertzen (SA)
Player of the match: Ricky Ponting (Aus)

- England won the toss and elected to bat.

Day one

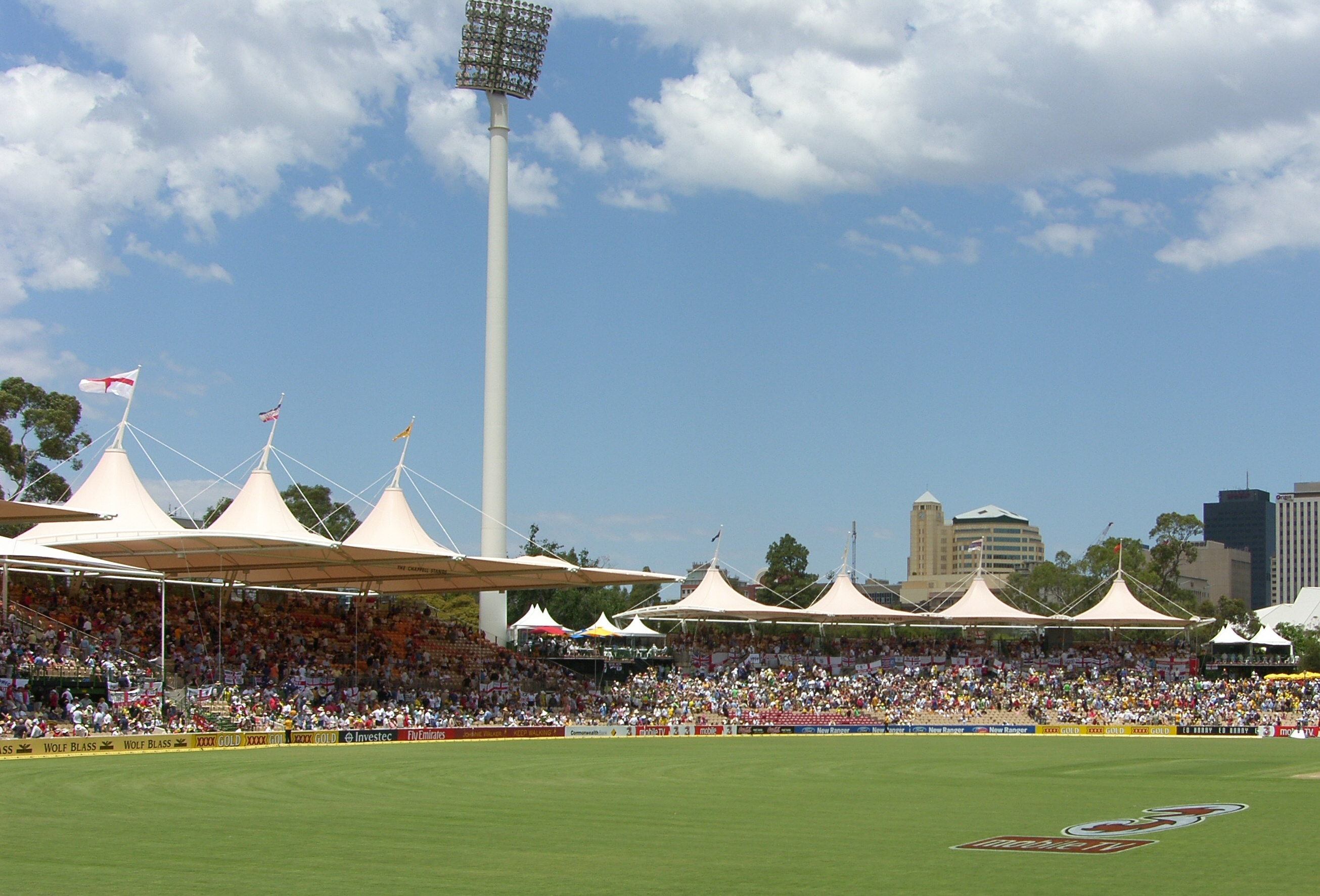
Crowds in the Chappell stands during the Adelaide match

In a similar fashion to 2005, England named an unchanged XI for the second Test, despite Cricinfo and others suggesting that it was "almost certain" that Monty Panesar would replace James Anderson. Australia also named an unchanged team after Glenn McGrath passed a late fitness test. He was earlier rated as a 50/50 chance to play due to a heel injury.

Andrew Flintoff won the toss and elected to bat first. Early on, the dry flat wicket offered little for the Australian bowlers who toiled in the first hour for no wicket. Stuart Clark took the first wicket, with Andrew Strauss being caught by Damien Martyn for 14 runs. This was the third time in the series that Strauss had been caught attempting to play on the leg side. Clark then took the wicket of Alastair Cook for 27 runs, having him caught behind by Adam Gilchrist. The periods before and just after lunch were dominated by Shane Warne, who bowled with consistent line and length to keep both Ian Bell and Paul Collingwood restricted to about two runs per over. Bell continued his struggle against Warne, who beat Bell's bat on several occasions. Despite a slow scoring rate, the batsmen made a good fightback in the afternoon session, despite some persistent Australian bowling. Both batsmen reached their half-centuries in the last over before the tea interval, which England reached with the score at 144/2. After tea, England came out looking to increase the scoring rate. Soon, however, Bell was caught and bowled by Brett Lee as he skied an attempted pull to the leg side. Kevin Pietersen was aggressive from his first ball, going on to make his half-century off just 70 balls. The scoring rate increased somewhat in the evening session as England increased their score to 266/3 at stumps. Collingwood was not out on 98 runs, tantalisingly close to a maiden Ashes century. The day's honours were roughly even. Australia would have liked more than three wickets, but they did keep England's scoring rate low on a flat, dry wicket.

Day two

Australia resumed play on the second day with the ball only six overs old, while England's Collingwood required two runs to make a century. Collingwood made his runs in the second over of the morning, off the second ball he faced. Pietersen made his own century later in the morning. England again scored relatively slowly, but survived the first session without losing a wicket to be 347/3 at lunch. The two batsmen continued after lunch in a session that would go on to break several previous partnership records for English batting. Collingwood increased his score to a personal best innings of 206, becoming only the third Englishman to score a double-century in Australia, and the first in 70 years. He was out caught behind by Gilchrist from an outswinging Clark delivery on the final ball before tea. After the interval, Pietersen went on to make 158 before being run out. Collingwood, and particularly Pietersen, consistently attacked the Australian bowlers, forcing them to take up defensive fielding positions for the first time in the series. Noticeably, Warne bowled defensively outside leg stump from around the wicket to Pietersen, having exhausted all other methods of containment. Flintoff and Ashley Giles added 60 runs for the sixth wicket before the innings was declared at 551/6.

The Australian bowling was generally ineffective during the England innings, despite keeping the run rate low. McGrath conceded his first analysis of 0/100 or worse in Test cricket, and was targeted by Pietersen in particular, who took three fours off his first over of the second day. It was speculated that while McGrath had declared himself fit for the game, he was still struggling with his sore heel. Despite his defensive bowling, Warne conceded his worst innings figures of 1/167.

Australia had to face nine overs before the close of play. Flintoff, who opened the bowling with Matthew Hoggard, took the wicket of Justin Langer during this short period. The Australian score at stumps was 28/1, making day two the first day of the series which clearly belonged to England. However, the question remained as to whether England's bowling attack would perform any better than Australia's on a good batting pitch in the days ahead.

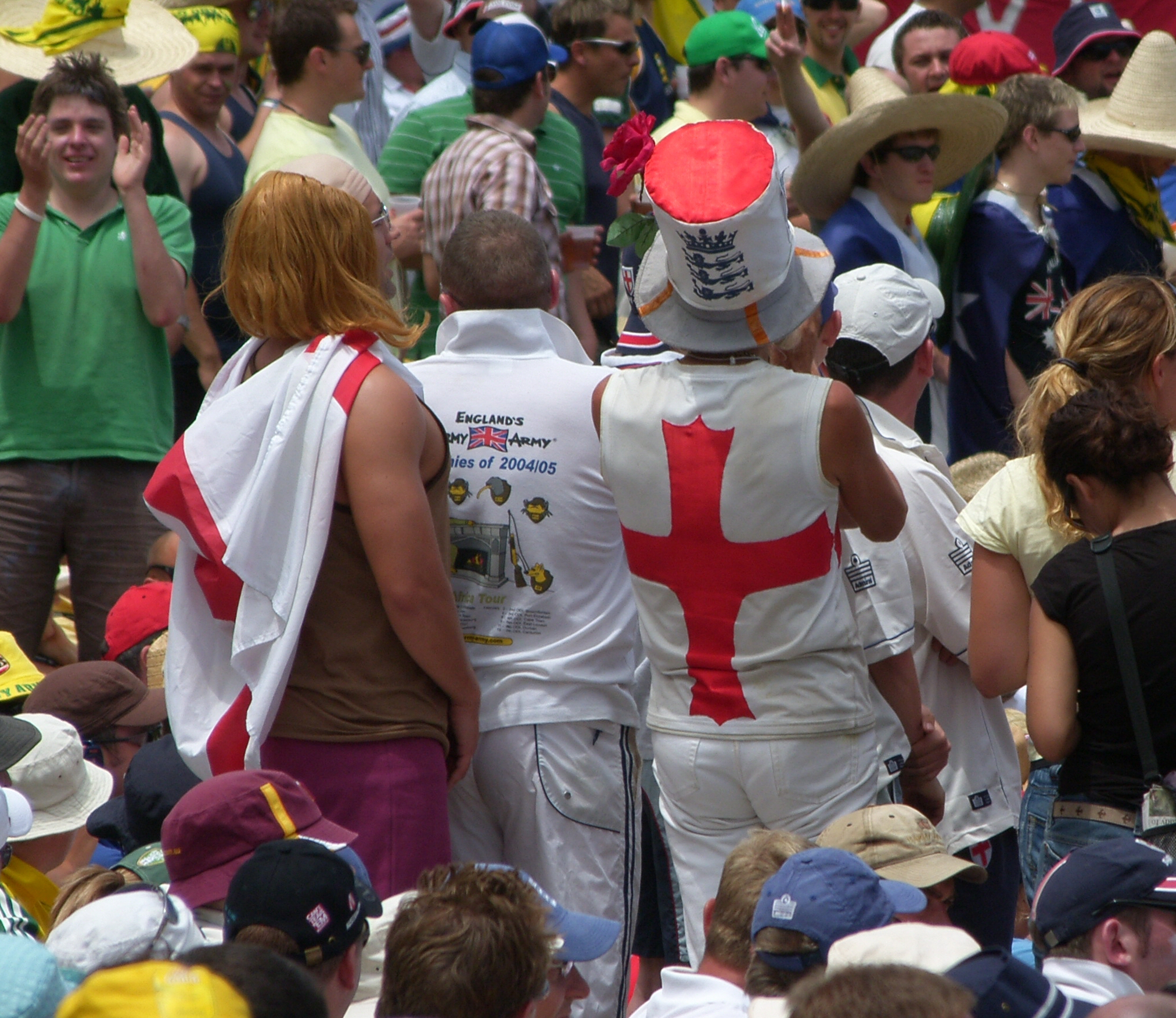
Barmy Army England fans at Adelaide, 1 December

Day three

England started the day strongly, their bowling attack testing the Australians as Hoggard claimed two wickets before lunch. The first came in the 13th over of the innings as Matthew Hayden edged a delivery to the gloves of Geraint Jones. The second was in the 23rd over when Bell took a comfortable slip catch off Martyn. This left Australia on 65/3. Anderson and Steve Harmison also bowled well, proving to be much more accurate and economical in their bowling than they had in the first Test at Brisbane.

At times England's fielding was inept, however. In the morning session, Ricky Ponting survived a dropped catch by Giles and a run out chance missed by Collingwood when on 35 and 43 respectively. Ponting reached his half-century just before lunch, taking his side to 3/105 at the interval.

Following the lunch break, Ponting returned to build a solid partnership with Michael Hussey. The Australian batsmen remained at the crease throughout the afternoon session. Ponting reached his 33rd Test century in the 62nd over, just before tea. This score saw him become Australia's leading century-scorer in Test history and took the home side to 3/185.

After tea, Australia continued to settle into their batting rhythm as Hussey reached his 50 in the 64th over. England began to lose the advantage they had established early in the day, with runs coming more easily to Australia. In the 73rd over Hussey survived a dramatic run out chance which had to be referred to the third umpire as he slid his bat back into his crease a fraction of a second before Jones broke the stumps off an Anderson throw. It was not until after the new ball had been taken in the 83rd over that England got a breakthrough. Hoggard was again the successful bowler, claiming Ponting for 142 and later Hussey for 91 in the 91st over. After the fall of Hussey's wicket, Michael Clarke and Gilchrist established themselves at the crease to end the day on 30 and 13 respectively. The Australian score was 312/5, 40 runs short of the follow-on target.

Day four

The Australian batsmen started well and by mid-session had started to dominate the England bowling and increase the run rate. The Australians passed the follow-on target after drinks, and shortly after this Gilchrist and Clarke made their half-centuries. Just as Gilchrist was beginning to look dangerous and starting to score quickly, Giles had him caught attempting a six. He had made 64 runs off 79 balls, and the score was 384/6. Warne joined Clarke at the crease, and the pair negotiated through to lunch, taking the score to 417/6.

Clarke and Warne put on 100 runs between them in the afternoon session, with Clarke making a century. It was late in the afternoon before England finally made some inroads, with Hoggard striking either side of the tea interval. Warne was out leg before wicket just prior to the break. Clarke was caught by Giles after tea, having made 124 runs, and with the score at 505/8. Hoggard and Anderson took a wicket each to clean up the tail within eight overs, so that Australia were all out for 513 runs off 165.3 overs.

Hoggard bowled very well to take 7/109 on an unresponsive pitch. His figures were his third best in Test cricket and his best against Australia. Meanwhile, Clarke's third Test century had helped Australia pass the follow-on target and put the game into a position in which the draw was the most likely result.

In their second innings, England passed 19 overs to reach the close on 59/1. Cook was the man to lose his wicket, caught by Gilchrist off the bowling of Clark for nine.

Day five

Australia started the fifth day needing early wickets to try to force a result. They were successful in this quest, as England's second innings stumbled to 73/4 after the overnight batsmen scored at approximately one run per over. Strauss was caught by Hussey off the bowling of Warne for 34, although replay analysis appeared to show that the ball did not make contact with bat or gloves, an audible nick was heard after the ball was played and missed, which led to the subsequent decision. In Warne's next over, Bell was run out on 26. Collingwood called for a run and set off, but Bell did not respond until it was too late. The ball went to Clarke's left hand, his dominant side, and he was able to get the ball to Warne who threw down the stumps with an underarm throw, ending Bell's innings. Warne struck again in his next over as Pietersen was clean bowled behind his legs as he attempted a sweep. Four overs later, England lost Flintoff, who edged Lee through to the wicket-keeper, leaving the score on 77/5. England scored only 30 runs in the session for the loss of four wickets, making the score at lunch 89/5, a lead of just 127.

England continued to lose wickets after the break. Jones swung his bat at a wide delivery and edged to Hayden in the gully in the second over after lunch. Giles made an eight ball duck, edging to Hayden, this time at slip. Hoggard was able to block for a while, but was eventually bowled off the inside edge by Warne. Harmison and Anderson each held up an end for periods before tea, but both were trapped leg before wicket by McGrath, Anderson's wicket ending the innings. Collingwood was the not out batsman, scoring only 22 runs, but crucially occupying the crease for 119 balls and approximately three hours. England lost their last nine wickets for 60 runs. Tea was taken at the change of innings with the result of the game finely in the balance. Australia required 168 runs to win the game, while England could only hope to prevent this from happening in the remaining 36 overs and obtain a draw.

With a target to chase, Australia started their final innings aggressively, taking 13 off the first two overs. England hit back, as Langer was caught in the gully off Hoggard in the third over. Hayden was caught by Collingwood after top-edging Flintoff. Hussey was promoted up the batting order to join Ponting, putting Australia's two in-form batsmen at the crease. The pair steadied the innings while continuing to score runs above the required rate. Again, progress stuttered in the 22nd and 23rd overs, as Ponting was caught off Giles at short extra cover for 49, and Martyn was caught off Flintoff at point for five. However, Hussey and Clarke were able to continue Australia's progress.

Hussey saw his team home, scoring 61 not out and hitting the winning runs with three overs to spare. This set off jubilant celebrations among the Australian players and the crowd, who had poured into the Adelaide Oval during the afternoon, as news spread of England's second innings demise, and the chance of an Australian victory in the afternoon/evening session. Australia won the Test by six wickets, and led in the series by two matches to none. The official attendance over the five days was announced as 136,731. Members of the Nine Network commentary team noted that it was indeed a remarkable victory, perhaps one of the greatest in Test history. Simon Barnes argues that "a match that should have been drawn was won by Warne's overwhelming nature; by the powerful outpouring of his chi or life force." The test, particularly the final day, would come to be known as "Amazing Adelaide".

=== Third Test ===
14–18 December
Scorecard

Australia	v	England
244 (71 overs); Michael Hussey 74* (162); Monty Panesar 5/92 (24 overs)		215 (64.1 overs); Kevin Pietersen 70 (123); Stuart Clark 3/49 (15.1 overs)
527/5d (112 overs); Michael Clarke 135* (164); Monty Panesar 3/145 (34 overs)		350 (122.2 overs); Alastair Cook 116 (290); Shane Warne 4/115 (39.2 overs)

Australia won by 206 runs
WACA Ground, Perth
Umpires: Aleem Dar (Pak) and Rudi Koertzen (SA)
Player of the match: Michael Hussey (Aus)

- Australia won the toss and elected to bat.
- Adam Gilchrist's 100 runs from 57 balls was the quickest century in Ashes history, and the second-quickest century in Test cricket.

Day one

Australia made one change to the side that won in Adelaide as Andrew Symonds came into the team following the shock retirement of Damien Martyn. England dropped Ashley Giles and James Anderson, replacing them with Monty Panesar and Sajid Mahmood respectively. Ricky Ponting won the toss and elected to bat. Panesar justified his selection taking five wickets, the best figures by an English spinner in Perth. Steve Harmison took four wickets, relieving the pressure that had been growing on him after taking 1/288 in the first two Tests. Harmison and Panesar combined to bowl Australia out for 244. Michael Hussey finished 74 not out, the only player of six top-eight batsmen to convert a 20-plus score into a long stay at the crease. England lost 2/51 after an aggressive start by openers Alastair Cook and Andrew Strauss. Strauss and Paul Collingwood were the overnight batsmen, the latter having been reprieved by a dropped catch from the bowling of Stuart Clark.

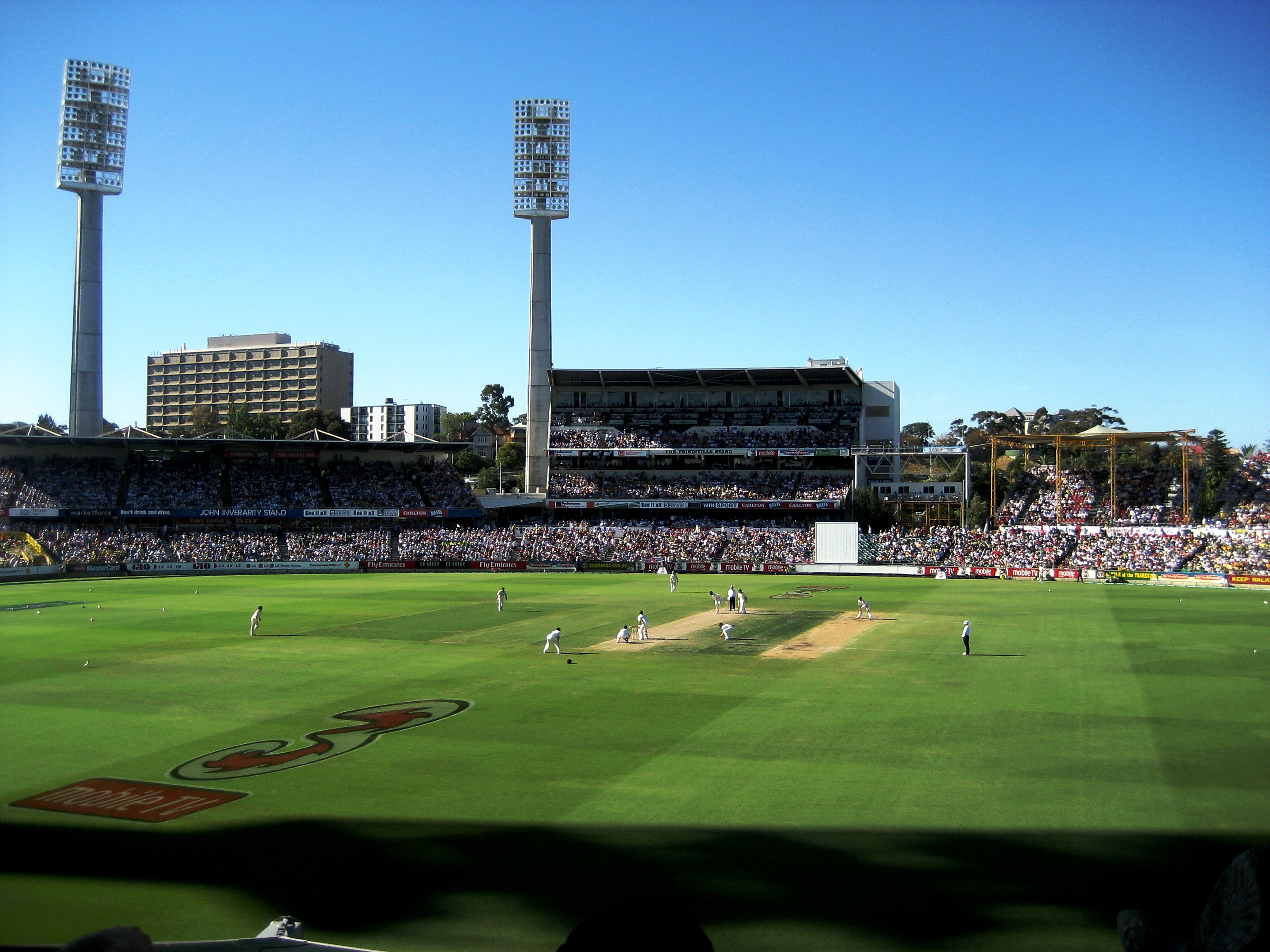
Day two at the WACA Ground

Day two

England lost four wickets in the first session on day two with only Kevin Pietersen of the recognised batsmen remaining at lunch. Strauss suffered another contentious decision after being adjudged caught behind off Clark when replays suggested he had missed the ball despite a nick being heard. Collingwood had already been dismissed, caught in the gully off the bowling of Glenn McGrath, and the wickets of the out of form Andrew Flintoff and Geraint Jones to Symonds soon followed. Australia bowled England out for 215 on the stroke of tea, giving the Australians a first innings lead of 29 runs despite lower order resistance from Panesar and Harmison as well as a 70 from Pietersen.

In reply, Australia's second innings began shakily with Justin Langer bowled on the very first ball by Matthew Hoggard. Australia recovered well though through Matthew Hayden and captain Ponting, who were each on an unbeaten 57 at stumps with Australia at 119/1.

Day three

Australia resumed at 119/1. With the Ashes series on the line and 42-degree heat, Ponting and Hayden improved on their overnight scores, but fell short of centuries, scoring 75 and 92 respectively after lunch. Michael Clarke and Hussey both recorded centuries, with Clarke's being his second in as many Tests. Hussey got out rather cheaply, being caught behind by Jones. Adam Gilchrist made a quickfire 50 off only 40 balls. After that, he hit 3 sixes and a four from one Panesar over, with the over ultimately costing 24 runs. Subsequent overs cost 10 and 18, with Gilchrist recording his century in just 57 balls, the fastest century in Ashes history and the second-fastest in all Tests to date behind Viv Richards. In an interview after the day's play, Gilchrist explained that he was unaware of how close he was to the record until after he had scored his century until Ian Healy mentioned it to him during that interview, but was not disappointed to be behind a player regarded as one of the most damaging hitters to play the game. Soon after, Ponting declared the innings and sent England in to bat. Brett Lee took Strauss' wicket with an inswinging ball, which Strauss left and it thundered into the pads and was given out, this left England at 0/1. By stumps, the score had progressed to 19/1.

Day four

England resumed their innings under immense pressure, needing a further 538 runs to win with nine wickets in hand or needing to bat for two days to draw the game and keep the series alive. With the pitch looking good for batting and no real movement off the seam, this seemed possible with some sensible batting.

Ian Bell started aggressively against the Australian pace bowlers while Cook took his time, and when Shane Warne came on he found himself being battered for a 4 and a 6 by Bell off his first over. Bell continued to bat positively and posted his 10th half-century. England managed to add 80 runs for no loss, going into lunch at 99/1. Coming into the afternoon session, Bell and Cook played positively, attacking the Australian bowlers. Cook managed to post his half-century and soon England were starting to think about a victory. However, Warne got Bell caught by Justin Langer for a well composed 87. That left England on 170/2 with Collingwood coming in, looking to continue the good work. There was a period where Collingwood seemed so intent on staying in, he forgot to score. England went into tea at 170/2, having scored 81 runs for 1 wicket in the session.

England came out to the evening session hoping to bat through losing one wicket maximum. Just a few overs in, Collingwood edged one through to the keeper, out for 5 off 36 balls. After that partnership in which 15 runs were scored for 75 balls, England had to bat more aggressively and Pietersen seemed the perfect man to do that for the team. Cook started looking much more confident against Warne and soon he was one run away from his maiden Ashes century, not made easy by Warne but eventually, Cook got the run to bring up a 257-ball 100. The day had belonged firmly to England, but with just three overs left, McGrath took the wicket of Cook, edging behind to Gilchrist, and bowled nightwatchman Hoggard for a second-ball duck. McGrath proceeded to beat Flintoff with the remaining two balls, including an unsuccessful appeal for caught-behind. Flintoff and Pietersen, saw out the remaining overs, leaving England on 265/5.

Day five

England started the fifth and final day of the match in an aggressive fashion, which many found surprising. Flintoff, in particular, took the Australian bowlers to task, including striking Clark for three consecutive fours and striking a Lee delivery for six, just inches out of the reach of Hussey, who was fielding at deep mid-wicket.

Pietersen was unusually reserved and was almost run out by some quick reaction fielding from Hussey in the first hour, but was given the benefit of the doubt by the third umpire who eventually gave it not out, much to the delight of the Barmy Army.

After that huge scare for England, Pietersen charged down the pitch and smacked Warne through mid wicket for four, bringing up yet another half-century. Soon after that, Flintoff brought up his half-century with an inside edge and Ponting was starting to look nervous, perhaps considering England could pull off the impossible.

Australia finally broke through when Flintoff misjudged the length of a straighter ball from Warne and was bowled. He was quickly followed by Jones; his dismal tour continued when he was run out in astounding fashion. Having failed in an attempt to sweep Warne, Jones was struck on the pad, resulting in an unsuccessful appeal for lbw from the Australians. Jones, however, was too preoccupied waiting for the umpire's verdict to notice that his back foot was out of his batting crease. This fact did not escape an alert Ponting, however, who swooped in from silly point and underarmed the ball into the stumps. Jones was out for a duck – his second of the match.

The remaining English batsmen, Harmison, Mahmood and Panesar, offered the Australian bowlers no trouble, with the last man, Panesar, being dismissed by Warne two balls after the lunch break, leaving Warne with 699 career Test wickets leading into the Boxing Day Test at the Melbourne Cricket Ground. Pietersen continued a fine tour with relatively subdued 60 not out.

Attendance for the five days was 103,440, breaking the 1970 record of 84,142.

The victory gave Australia an unbeatable 3–0 lead in the best-of-five series.

=== Fourth Test ===
26–28 December
Scorecard

England	v	Australia
159 (74.2 overs); Andrew Strauss 50 (132); Shane Warne 5/39 (17.2 overs)		419 (108.3 overs); Andrew Symonds 156 (220); Sajid Mahmood 4/100 (21.3 overs)
161 (65.5 overs); Andrew Strauss 31 (107); Brett Lee 4/47 (18.5 overs)

Australia won by an innings and 99 runs
Melbourne Cricket Ground, Melbourne
Umpires: Aleem Dar (Pak) and Rudi Koertzen (SA)
Player of the match: Shane Warne (Aus)

- England won the toss and elected to bat.
- Start of play was delayed on day 1 due to rain.

Day one

Weather conditions were poor with heavily overcast skies and patchy showers. Andrew Flintoff won the toss and elected to bat. The start of the first session of play was delayed by 30 minutes due to rain, commencing at 11:00 local time (00:00 UTC). The pitch was green, damp and unpredictable with a lot of seam movement. Although England managed to survive through to lunch at 1/36, Ian Bell fell shortly after the lunch interval to a Stuart Clark lbw. Paul Collingwood and Andrew Strauss appeared to have embarked on a good partnership and brought the score to 2/101. Brett Lee then removed Collingwood with a catch by Ricky Ponting in the slips. Two balls later, Shane Warne took his 700th Test wicket by clean bowling Strauss, who had just reached 50.

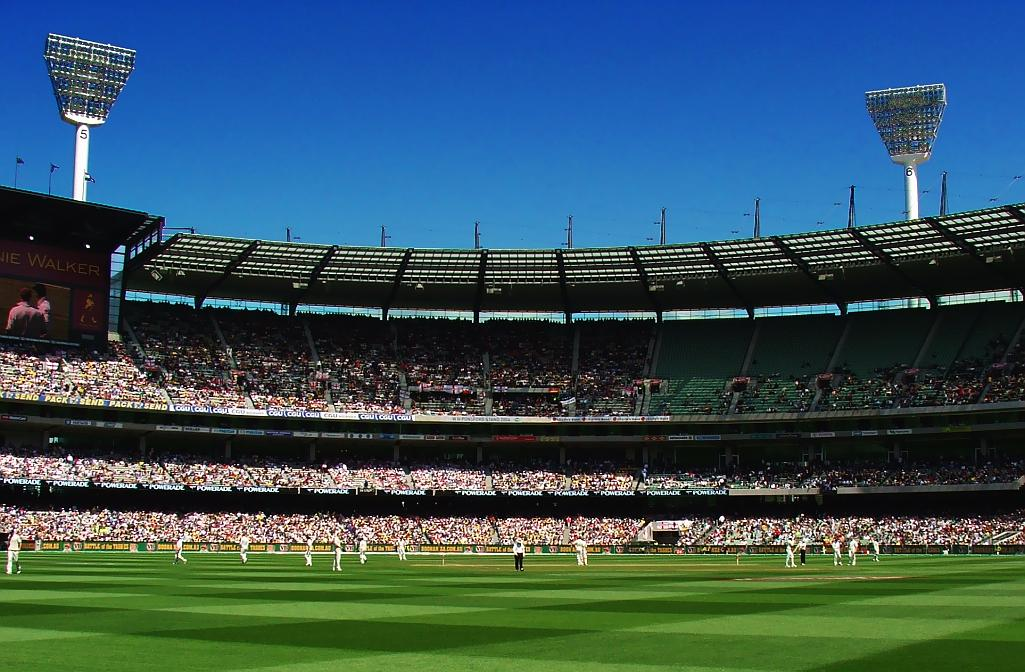
A view of the Melbourne Cricket Ground on Day 2.

England subsequently collapsed and finished all out for 159 with Warne taking a further four wickets. England had lost their final eight wickets for a mere 58 runs. When Australia commenced batting it appeared that Justin Langer and Matthew Hayden might run away with the match, and England's frustration was compounded by the rejection of a number of creditable lbw appeals. However, Flintoff restored considerable confidence when he had Langer and nightwatchman Lee caught behind on successive deliveries in the 10th over. Australia finished the day at 2/48.

Day two

The morning session was completely dominated by England, who collected the prize wickets of Ponting, Michael Hussey and Michael Clarke for a combined total of 18 runs. Although Hayden had managed to survive despite several strong appeals, Australia looked in severe trouble at 5/84, with the unproven Andrew Symonds coming to the crease. England were, however, unable to capitalise on their advantage, and Hayden and Symonds wrested control of the match back in Australia's favour throughout most of the remaining two sessions. Hayden achieved his century just before tea, and Australia resumed the third session at 5/226. Symonds subsequently achieved his maiden Test century with a powerful six to long on.

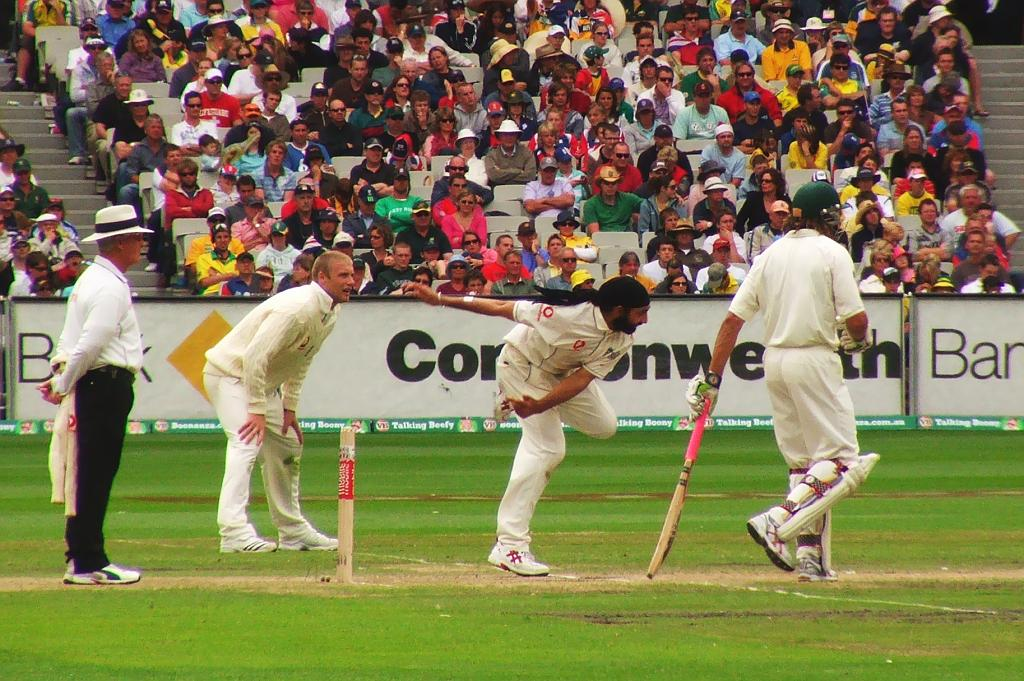
Monty Panesar bowling, 28 December

Although Hayden fell late in the day for 153, swiftly followed by Adam Gilchrist (for one run), the match appeared close to irretrievable for England. At the close of play, Australia had recovered from 5/85 to reach 7/372 (a lead of 213) with Symonds and Warne still at the crease.

Day three

Like the morning session of the previous day, England initially gave themselves some grounds for optimism. The wicket of Symonds fell early and only Warne provided any resistance as the tail was cleaned up, with Australia all out for 419 (a lead of 260). The originally bowler-friendly pitch appeared to have flattened out considerably, and the total did not appear as imposing as it might have otherwise been. Unfortunately for England the four Australia bowlers gave no quarter, and England went from 0/41 to 3/49 as the pacemen ripped through the top order. The pressure did not relent, and ultimately England succumbed midway through the final session to be all out for a mere 161 runs. The victory margin was an innings and 99 runs, giving Ponting his first innings victory in an Ashes Test, in what was clearly England's poorest performance of the series thus far. Lee recorded his best bowling figures of the series with 4/87. Warne was named Man of the Match for his bowling figures of 5/39 and 2/46, and his resilient 40* with the bat. Warne's dismissal of Steve Harmison was also his 999th international wicket (combining Test and ODI figures), leaving him one shy of becoming only the second player in history to reach the 1,000 milestone (after Muttiah Muralitharan).

This was the 100th test match to be played at the MCG. Attendance over the three days totalled 244,351 fans, which is the largest Test crowd for a match of less than five days duration. This included a crowd of 89,155 fans for day one of the fourth Test, a record for the Ashes and also a record for a Boxing Day match at the ground, just shy of the official all-time mark of 90,800 (set at the MCG when Australia played the West Indies during the 1960–61 season).

=== Fifth Test ===
2–5 January
Scorecard

England	v	Australia
291 (103.4 overs); Andrew Flintoff 89 (142); Stuart Clark 3/62 (24 overs)		393 (96.3 overs); Shane Warne 71 (65); James Anderson 3/98 (26 overs)
147 (58 overs); Kevin Pietersen 29 (95); Glenn McGrath 3/38 (21 overs)		46/0 (10.5 overs); Matthew Hayden 23* (22)

Australia won by 10 wickets
Sydney Cricket Ground, Sydney
Umpires: Aleem Dar (Pak) and Billy Bowden (NZ)
Player of the match: Stuart Clark (Aus)

- England won the toss and elected to bat.
- No play was possible before 11:40 a.m. on Day 1 due to rain.

The fifth Test at the SCG was the 300th Ashes Test. England made one change to their side from the fourth Test, with James Anderson coming in for Matthew Hoggard, who had suffered a side-strain. Australia named the same side that won in Melbourne. To recognise the careers of retiring Australia players Glenn McGrath and Shane Warne, "Thx Glenn" and "Thx Shane" were painted on the ground in place of the "mobile" part of the 3 logos. When Justin Langer also announced his retirement during the match, a "Thx Justin" sign was painted on the ground also.

Day one

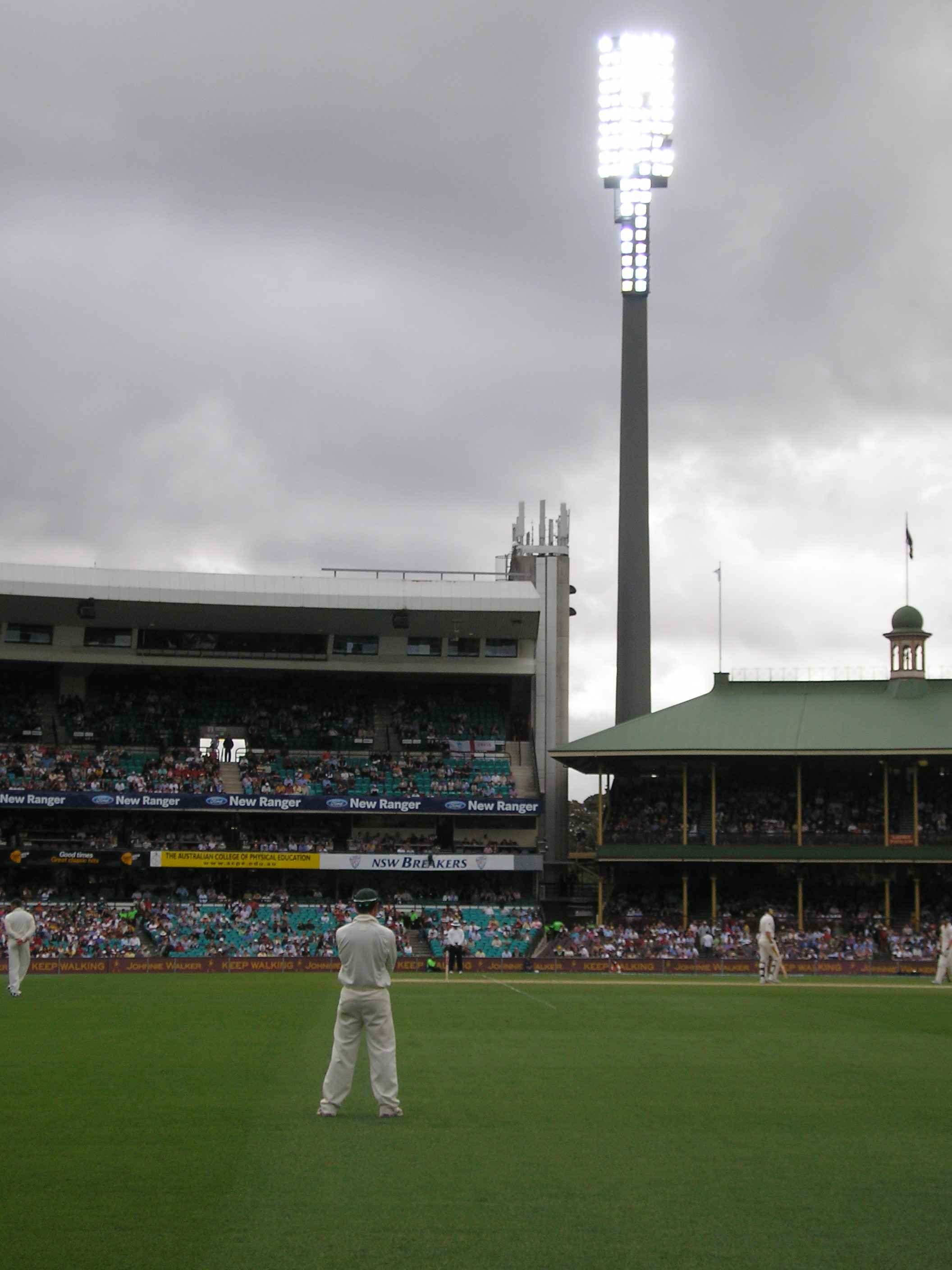
Cloud forced the lights to be turned on during the first day

As in Melbourne, rain delayed the start in Sydney. When the toss finally came at 11:10 local time (00:10 UTC), England won and captain Andrew Flintoff elected to bat first. Play commenced at 11:40 local time (00:40 UTC). Andrew Strauss was dropped on 21 by Justin Langer, but was out eight runs later to an easy Adam Gilchrist catch off a miscued cut shot against Brett Lee. England reached lunch on 58/1, but Alastair Cook departed for 20 shortly after the restart when he edged a Stuart Clark delivery to Gilchrist.

Kevin Pietersen then joined Ian Bell at the crease and the two batted for nearly all of the middle session, for a partnership of 108 including 70 from Bell. Shortly after tea, with England on 2/166, McGrath took Pietersen's wicket for 41 when he top-edged a pull for a Michael Hussey catch. After Paul Collingwood came to bat, Bell only lasted one more run before McGrath clean bowled him in his next over, leaving England at 4/167. Collingwood (25*) and Flintoff (42*) then steadied matters until bad light forced an early end to the day's affairs.

Day two

Play started 11 minutes earlier than normal (10:19 local time) to recover some of the time lost on the first day.

Less than a half-hour in, shortly after Flintoff got his half-century, McGrath took Collingwood's wicket off an edge to Gilchrist. Within 20 minutes, Lee took the wickets of Chris Read for two and Sajid Mahmood for a duck off consecutive balls, reducing England to 257/7. Flintoff and Steve Harmison stayed at the crease for 25 runs before Harmison was given out lbw to Clark. Just before the lunch break, Flintoff fell for 89 after trying to slog Clark but edging to Gilchrist. A clearly out-of-sorts Warne was able to pick up his 1,000th international wicket to end the England innings on 291, trapping Monty Panesar lbw for a duck.

The Australian openers Justin Langer and Matthew Hayden started confidently, but Langer faltered on 26, gloving an Anderson ball to Read. Ponting and Hayden found batting easy against a defensive field setting until Hayden played a foolish stroke and top-edged a Harmison ball to Collingwood. Ponting appeared supremely confident against the bowling, but was undone by the fielding when an Anderson throw found him well short of his ground, and he departed for 45. Clarke was then caught behind off a sharply rising Harmison delivery. Symonds and Hussey then batted very defensively during the rain-interrupted remainder of the final session.

Day three

Hussey fell in only the second over of the day to a Read catch off Anderson. With this England appeared to have made a contest of it with Australia at 5/190, still trailing by over 100 runs. But, as on so many previous occasions in the series, Australia retaliated in a fearsome manner.

Symonds and Gilchrist added a steady 70 runs before Symonds saw his stumps tumble to a superb Panesar ball. Warne then joined Gilchrist at the crease and put England's bowling to the sword, with a 58 run partnership in only seven overs, including a four and six off the first two balls Warne faced. Gilchrist was given out caught behind, although replays indicated the decision was a bad one. Lee joined Warne at 7/317 but departed quickly, and Clark then delivered a sparkling tail-ender innings of 35. Warne's fairy-tale dream of a maiden Test century in his final match ended when he was easily stumped after swinging wildly at a Panesar ball, but he had earned the top-scorer mantle with 71, and England found themselves with a deficit of 102.

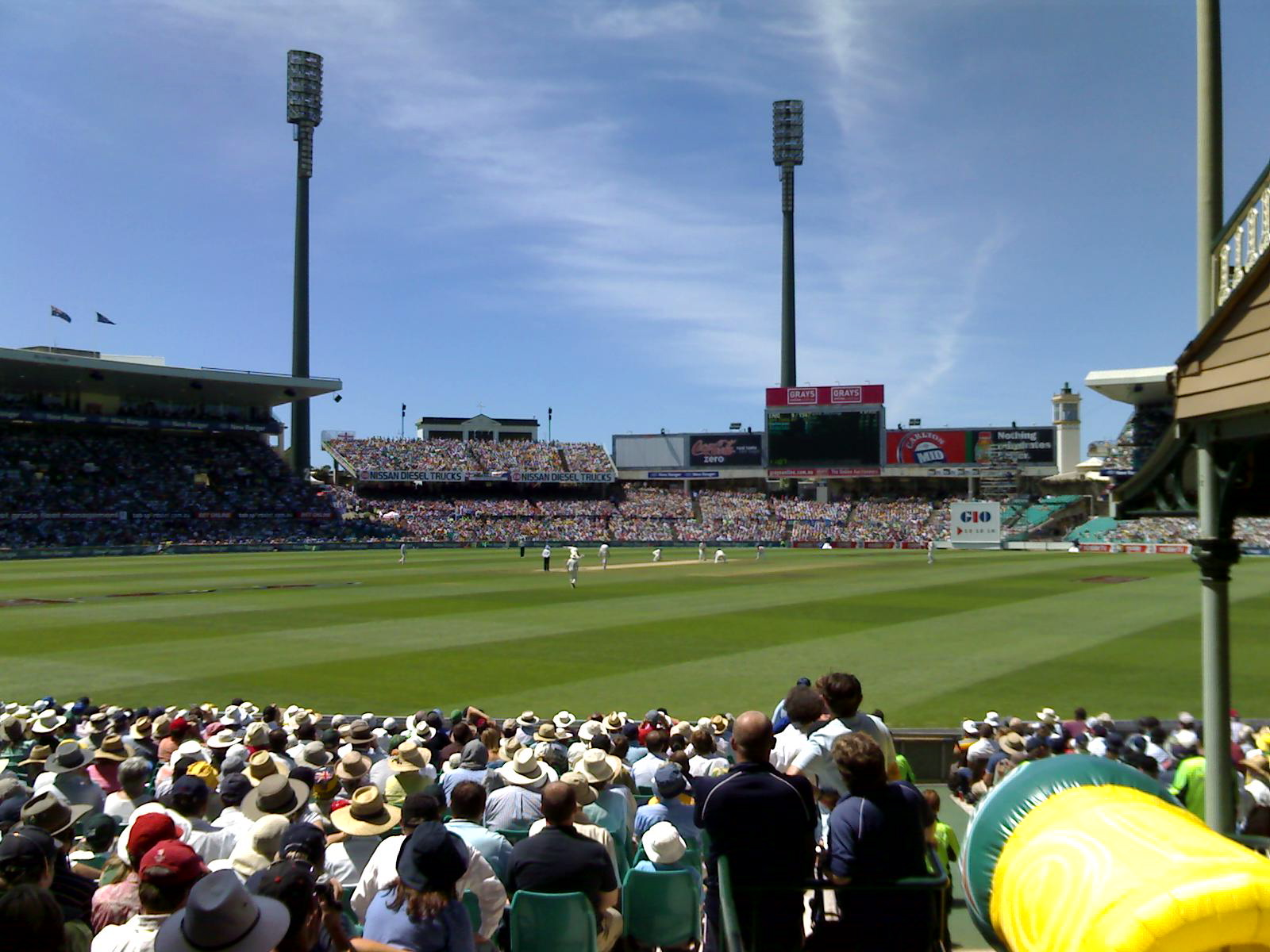
Shane Warne bowling to England's James Anderson in what became one of his final balls in Test cricket.

The English second innings began dismally with Cook edging to Gilchrist off Lee with the score only at 5. Hopes were faintly restored when Strauss and Bell appeared to be settling in, but after Clark trapped Strauss lbw and Bell edged Lee to Gilchrist, England were looking fragile at 3/64. Collingwood soon departed cheaply, and Flintoff was sent to the pavilion after an agonizingly close—but fair—stumping decision by the third umpire. Flintoff's dismissal would later prove to be the final wicket of Warne's illustrious Test career. Panesar was then sent in as nightwatchman, and survived to the end of the day.

At the end of the day, England were facing the grave prospect of a 5–0 Ashes whitewash after closing a mere 12 runs ahead of Australia with only five wickets remaining.

Day four

Whatever tiny hope England had of taking the match to a fifth day was quashed on the third ball of the first over when Pietersen edged to Gilchrist off McGrath. Poor judgment led to a Panesar run-out for a duck, and England had lost two wickets in the day without scoring a run. Mahmood and Read followed shortly thereafter, and England were 9/123. Anderson and Harmison combined for a valiant 10th wicket stand of 24, before Anderson skied a McGrath delivery to midwicket. The second innings was over, and England had only managed to set a target of 46 runs.

Australia's brief second innings was paradoxically the time that England delivered some of the finest bowling of the series. Langer was given a guard of honour by the English team as he walked out to his final innings, but he was then clearly tested by a series of superb rising deliveries from Harmison. Regardless, the match outcome was inevitable, and it was Hayden who lofted a six, followed by a single, to conclude the innings, the match and the series 5–0 whitewash, the first since 1920/21.

== Records and statistics ==
The series produced some notable records.

- In the first Test, Australia, achieved a first-innings lead of 445 runs, after making 602/9 declared and then dismissing England for 157. Rather than send England in again, Ponting chose to bat. Australia went on to win the Test.
- In the second Test, England batted first and made 551/6 declared. However, Australia went on to win the Test. The English first innings score thus became the largest ever to be attained by a team batting first and declaring only to lose the match.
- In the third Test, Adam Gilchrist's century in the second innings, scored off only 57 balls, became the second fastest century in any Test match (at the time; Brendon McCullum has since set a new record, after Viv Richards' century in 56 balls for the West Indies v England at St John's, 1985–86), and the fastest in any Ashes Test. Gilchrist scored 24 runs off one over from Monty Panesar (0, 2, 6, 6, 4, 6), the greatest number of runs taken off one over in Ashes cricket. This took Gilchrist's total number of sixes in his Test career to 97, the greatest number hit by any batsman.
- By losing the third Test, England ceded the Ashes to Australia. England's holding the Ashes urn for only 15 months made this the shortest period in Ashes history that a team has held the coveted honour of holding the Ashes.
- In the fourth Test, English wicket-keeper Chris Read took six catches in one Australian innings, equalling the greatest number of dismissals by an English keeper in an Ashes test. Read repeated the feat in Australia's innings in the fifth Test (this time with five catches and one stumping).
- In the fourth Test, Australian leg-spinner Shane Warne snared his 700th wicket, the first bowler in Test history to do so.
- By winning the fifth Test, Australia won the series 5–0, only the second team to win a "whitewash" in Ashes history. The feat had previously been achieved only by Warwick Armstrong's Australian team in 1920–21.

== Post-series ==
The series was notable for the retirement of Australia's Shane Warne, Justin Langer, Damien Martyn and Glenn McGrath. Additionally, the Australian coach John Buchanan along with McGrath had announced prior to the Ashes series that his retirement would be effective after the ICC Cricket World Cup 2007 series (of one-day internationals), so that the Ashes was his last Test series as coach.

Major concern was raised in England after a dramatic capitulation just 15 months after winning the coveted urn. As a result, many criticised Andrew Flintoff's captaincy and the resultant pressure placed on him following Michael Vaughan's injury and his own performances in 2005.

== Media coverage ==
Coverage of the 2006–07 Ashes series was broadcast as follows:

Television networks

- (Australia) Nine Network (Live)
- (Australia) WIN (Live)
- (Australia) NBN (Live)
- (Australia) Fox Sports (Highlights)
- (United Kingdom) Sky Sports (Live)
- (United Kingdom) BBC Two (Highlights)
- (India) ESPN Star (Live)
- (New Zealand) SKY Sport (Live)
- (South Africa) SuperSport

Radio

- (Australia) ABC Radio
- (United Kingdom) BBC Radio 4
- (United Kingdom) BBC Radio 5 Live Sports Extra
- (New Zealand) Radio Sport

Internet audio stream

- ABC Sport Archived 12 February 2007 at the Wayback Machine
- BBC Radio 5 Live Sports Extra
- Radio Sport NZ

Ball-by-ball web commentary

- Cricinfo – 1st Test, Cricinfo – 2nd Test, Cricinfo – 3rd Test, Cricinfo – 4th Test, Cricinfo – 5th Test
- Yahoo7
- Fox Sports
- BBC Cricket
- Stick Cricket

Over-by-over web commentary

- The Guardian
- Stick Cricket

Internet video highlights

- Cricket Australia
- BBC Cricket Archived 9 November 2006 at the Wayback Machine
- Sky Sports
- Yahoo7

== See also ==
- List of Ashes series

Preceded by: 2005 in England	Ashes series 2006–07 Ashes series	Followed by: 2009 in England
