= 2010 in Australia =

- Monarch: Elizabeth II
- Governor-General: Quentin Bryce
- Prime minister: Kevin Rudd, then Julia Gillard
- Population: 22,300,000
- Elections: SA, TAS, Federal, VIC

The following lists events that happened during 2010 in Australia.

- Decades: 1990s; 2000s; 2010s; 2020s; 2030s
- See also: 2010 in Australian television; 2010 in Australian literature; Other events of 2010; Federal election; Timeline of Australian history

== Incumbents ==
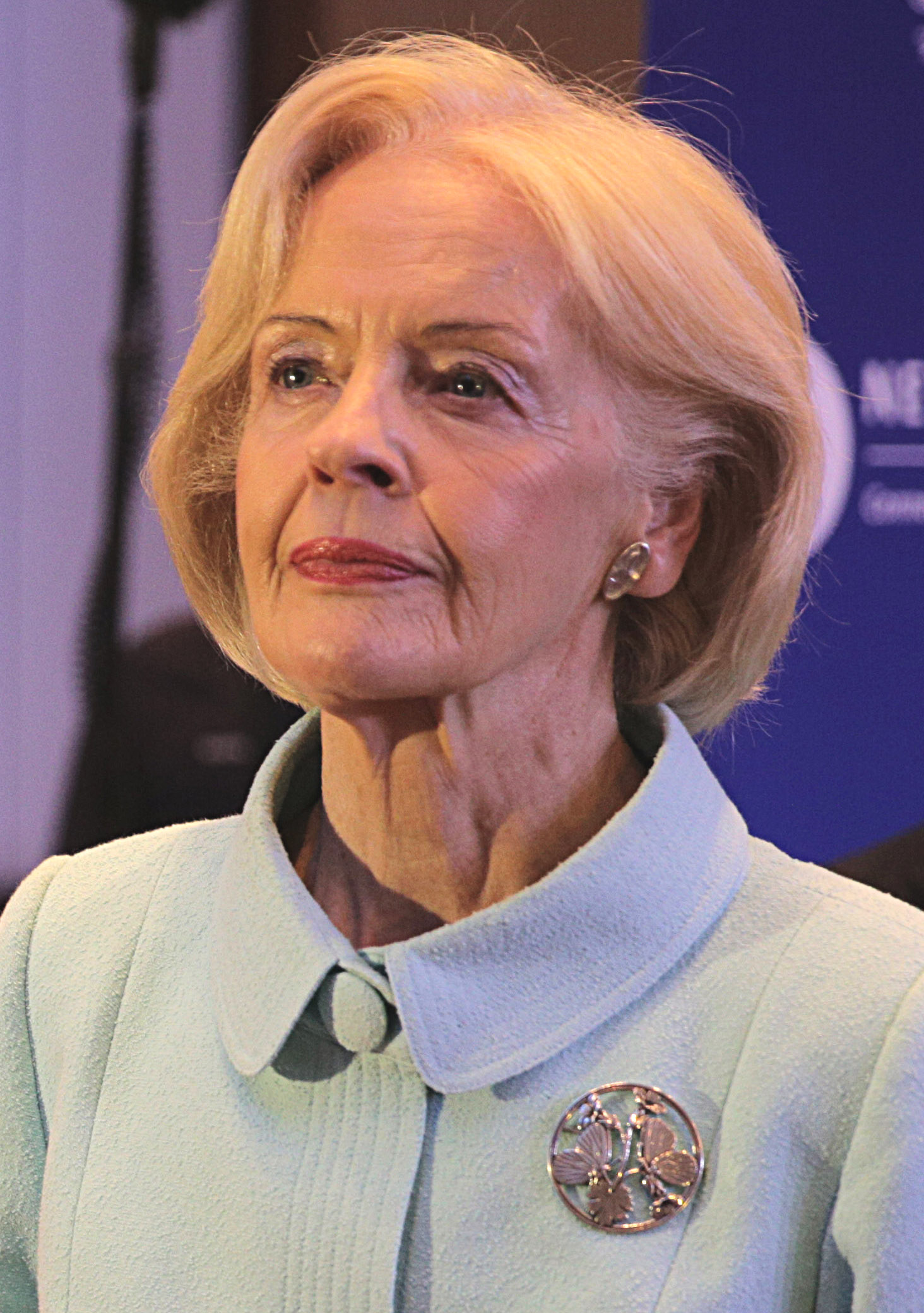
Quentin Bryce

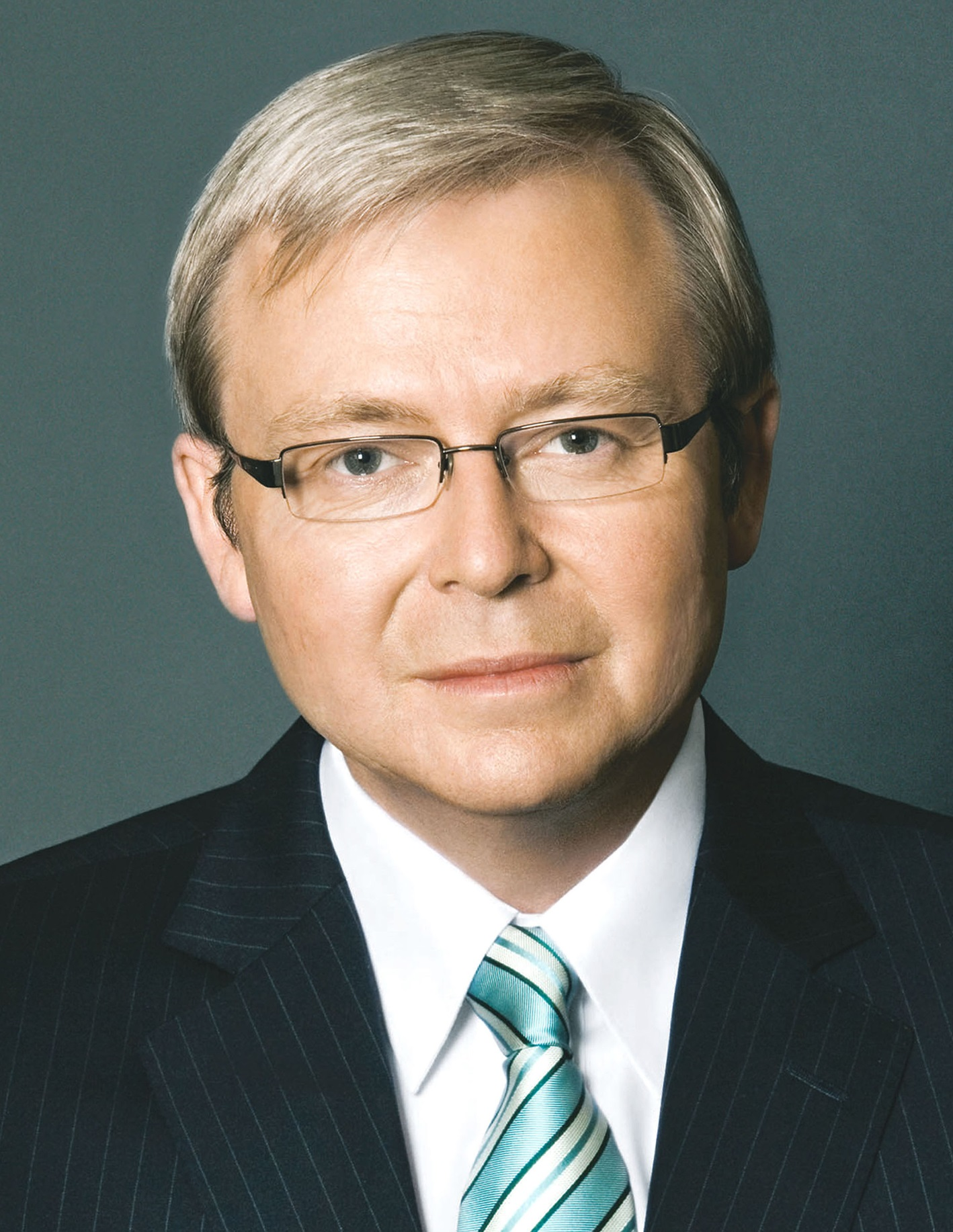
Kevin Rudd

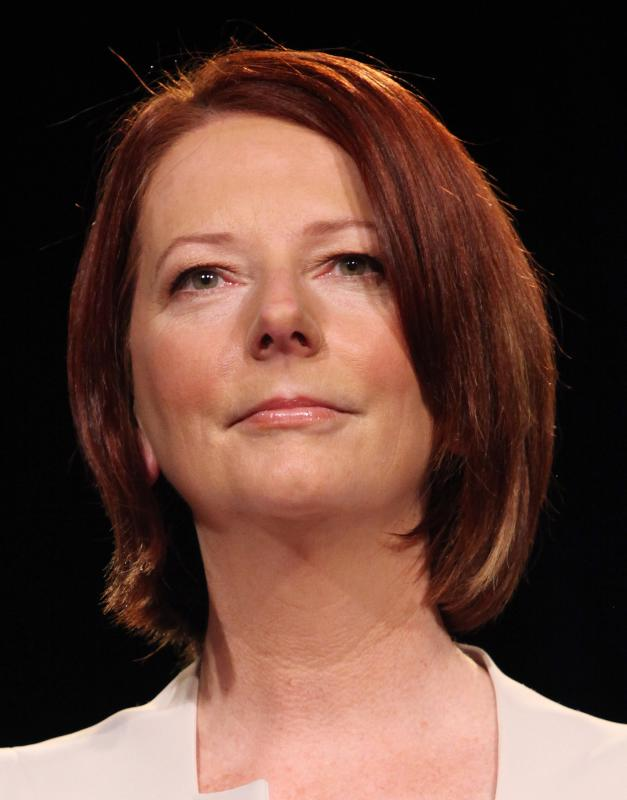
Julia Gillard

- Monarch – Elizabeth II
- Governor-General – Quentin Bryce
- Prime Minister – Kevin Rudd (until 24 June), then Julia Gillard
  - Deputy Prime Minister – Julia Gillard (until 24 June), then Wayne Swan
  - Opposition Leader – Tony Abbott
- Chief Justice – Robert French

=== State and territory leaders ===
- Premier of New South Wales – Kristina Keneally
  - Opposition Leader – Barry O'Farrell
- Premier of Queensland – Anna Bligh
  - Opposition Leader – John-Paul Langbroek
- Premier of South Australia – Mike Rann
  - Opposition Leader – Isobel Redmond
- Premier of Tasmania – David Bartlett
  - Opposition Leader – Will Hodgman
- Premier of Victoria – John Brumby (until 2 December), then Ted Baillieu
  - Opposition Leader – Ted Baillieu (until 2 December), then Daniel Andrews
- Premier of Western Australia – Colin Barnett
  - Opposition Leader – Eric Ripper
- Chief Minister of the Australian Capital Territory – Jon Stanhope
  - Opposition Leader – Zed Seselja
- Chief Minister of the Northern Territory – Paul Henderson
  - Opposition Leader – Terry Mills
- Chief Minister of Norfolk Island – Andre Nobbs (until 24 March), then David Buffett

=== Governors and administrators ===
- Governor of New South Wales – Marie Bashir
- Governor of Queensland – Penelope Wensley
- Governor of South Australia – Kevin Scarce
- Governor of Tasmania – Peter Underwood
- Governor of Victoria – David de Kretser
- Governor of Western Australia – Ken Michael
- Administrator of the Australian Indian Ocean Territories – Brian Lacy
- Administrator of Norfolk Island – Owen Walsh
- Administrator of the Northern Territory – Tom Pauling

== Events ==
=== Whole year ===
2010 was the year of 'Women in Local Government' and the year of the 'Girl Guide' to coincide with the 100th year of the Girl Guides.

=== January ===
- 2 January – The fatal stabbing of a young Indian man, Nitin Garg, in the Melbourne suburb of Yarraville generates deep anger in India, following other incidents of violence against Indian students in Australia.
- 7 January – The Queensland Government activates disaster relief funding for communities in central and southwest Queensland isolated by floods.
- 26 January – 82-year-old Iris Temperley is raped and murdered in the backyard of her home in Rockhampton, Queensland.

=== February ===
- 3 February – Following extensive public criticism, the South Australian Attorney-General Michael Atkinson announces that controversial new electoral legislation will be repealed after the South Australian state election to be held on 20 March 2010. The new legislation requires anyone responding online to a political report during an election period to provide their full name and postcode, with the information to be retained by the publisher for six months.
- 13 February – A by-election is held for the Victorian state electorate of Altona. Despite a double digit swing to the Liberal Party, the safe seat is retained by the Australian Labor Party candidate, Jill Hennessy.
- 19 February – Mary MacKillop is declared by Pope Benedict XVI to be a saint of the Roman Catholic Church, the first Australian so declared. A formal canonisation will take place in October 2010.
- 22–23 February – Police are called to Rose Bay in Sydney's eastern suburbs in the early morning hours of 23 February to remove an illuminated street sign which had been tampered with earlier in the evening so it would display to passing motorists that "Kevin Rudd Sucks".

=== March ===
- 1–2 March – A record rainfall for a single day, since 22 December 1956, with over 100mm of rain fall across 1.7 per cent of Australian territory on 1 March, and over 1.9 per cent of the country the following day.
- 1–20 March – Major floods hit southern Queensland and north western New South Wales, with Charleville, Roma and St George severely affected, resulting with significant damage to properties, roads and rail lines.
- 6 March – Severe thunderstorms and hail hit Melbourne and central Victoria, causing flash flooding and widespread property damage.
- 9–11 March – Official visit to Australia of President of Indonesia Susilo Bambang Yudhoyono. During the visit he is appointed an Honorary Companion of the Order of Australia (AC) and addresses the Australian Parliament, the first Indonesian head of state to do so.
- 17 March – The remains of Special Air Service members Lieutenant Kenneth Hudson and Private Robert Moncrieff are found in West Kalimantan. The Australian soldiers disappeared on 21 March 1966 whilst on patrol during the Indonesia–Malaysia confrontation.
- 17 March – The population of Heron and Lady Elliot Islands is evacuated to the mainland, in expectation of the approaching tropical Cyclone Ului.
- 20 March – State elections are held in South Australia and Tasmania.
- 21 March – The category 3 severe tropical Cyclone Ului crosses the Queensland coast near Airlie Beach, causing moderate damage.
- 22 March – A storm featuring torrential rain and large hailstones caused flash flooding, structural damage and loss of power to 150,000 houses in Perth.
- 24 March – South Australian Liberal leader Isobel Redmond concedes defeat following the 2010 state election.
- 25 March – The Australian Bureau of Statistics announces that the population of Australia now exceeds 22 million.
- 29 March – 100 boats have arrived since November 2007 bringing 4,386 asylum-seekers and at least 225 crew members to Australia. The 100th boat, with 41 passengers and 3 crew on board, was intercepted in the vicinity of Christmas Island.
- 31 March – The Queensland Government, the City of Gold Coast council and Australian Commonwealth Games Association officially launch the Gold Coast's bid to host the 2018 Commonwealth Games.

=== April ===
- 3 April – MV Shen Neng 1, a Chinese bulk carrier, runs aground off Great Keppel Island spilling fuel oil in the Great Barrier Reef Marine Park.
- 8 April – The Governor of Tasmania commissions David Bartlett to form a minority Labor government with the conditional support of the Tasmanian Greens, following the hung parliament result of the 2010 state election.
- 12 April – The Minister for Education, Julia Gillard, announces a taskforce has been established to investigate allegations of rorting in the Government's $16b Building the Education Revolution program aimed at upgrading facilities at Australian schools.
- 14 April – Peter Wellington MP introduces the Daylight Saving for South East Queensland Referendum Bill 2010 into Queensland Parliament which calls for a referendum to be held at the next State election on introduction of daylight saving time for South East Queensland.
- 20 April – The 5.2 M_{w} Kalgoorlie-Boulder earthquake shook Western Australia with a maximum Mercalli intensity of V (Moderate), damaging buildings and injuring two.
- 27 April – Prime Minister Kevin Rudd announces the deferral of the introduction of the proposed Carbon Pollution Reduction Scheme until after the end of the current commitment period of the Kyoto Protocol (which ends in 2012), citing a lack of bipartisan support for the proposal and slower progress than expected in terms of global action on climate change.

=== May ===
- 2 May – The Rudd Government announces it will tax the above-normal profits—known as super profits—of the mining industry to fund a superannuation rise and a company tax cut.
- 11 May – The 2010 Australian federal budget was released by the Treasurer of Australia, Wayne Swan.
- 15 May – 16-year-old sailor Jessica Watson completes a solo voyage around the world.

=== June ===
- 3 June – The township of Lennox Head on the North Coast of New South Wales is affected by a tornado, which destroys at least 40 properties.
- 19 June – A by-election is held for the New South Wales state electorate of Penrith. The by-election was won by the Liberal Party candidate Stuart Ayres with a record swing of 25.7% in two party preferred terms. The by-election was triggered by the resignation of Karyn Paluzzano after an admission that she lied to the Independent Commission Against Corruption and her subsequent expulsion from the Australian Labor Party.
- 24 June – Following a leadership spill, Julia Gillard replaces Kevin Rudd as leader of the Federal Australian Labor Party and hence Prime Minister of Australia. Gillard is the 27th Prime Minister and the first female appointed to that role.
- 26 June – The bodies of eleven people, including six board members of the Australian mining company Sundance Resources who were killed in a plane that crashed in West Africa, are recovered.
- 29 June – Jayant Patel is found guilty on three counts of manslaughter and one count of grievous bodily harm for his actions as Director of Surgery at Bundaberg Base Hospital between 2003 and 2005.
- 29 June – The Victorian government officially proclaims the creation of four new National Parks, based around the river red gum forests in the state's north—Barmah National Park, Gunbower National Park, Lower Goulburn River National Park and Warby-Ovens National Park.

=== July ===
- 2 July – Prime Minister Julia Gillard announces major changes to the Federal Government's proposed Resource Super Profits Tax, now known as the Mineral Resource Rent Tax, including a reduction in the headline rate to 30%.
- 19 July – 250 Australian and British WWI soldiers are laid to rest in a new Fromelles (Pheasant Wood) Military Cemetery in Fromelles, France. This is the first full cemetery that the Commonwealth War Graves Commission has constructed in more than 50 years.
- 31 July – A tornado hits the town of Penola, South Australia.

=== August ===
- 6 August – The High Court of Australia rules in the case Rowe & Anor v Electoral Commissioner & Anor that certain provisions of the Commonwealth Electoral Act 1918 are invalid, specifically those introduced in the Electoral and Referendum Amendment (Electoral Integrity and Other Measures) Act 2006, which close the electoral roll on the day the writ for a federal election is issued. An estimated 100,000 enrolments were being reconsidered by the Australian Electoral Commission, and would be contacted to inform them they would be eligible to vote in the 2010 election.
- 21 August – The 2010 federal election is held. The result is a hung parliament, with Labor and the Coalition winning 72 seats each. The balance of power is held by four independent MPs (Bob Katter, Rob Oakeshott, Andrew Wilkie and Tony Windsor), one Green (Adam Bandt) and a member of the WA Nationals (Tony Crook).

=== September ===
- 4 September – Widespread flooding across Victoria leads to the evacuation of hundreds of people and millions of dollars of property damage.
- 7 September – Seventeen days after the 2010 federal election, the three independent MPs holding the balance of power announce their decisions. Bob Katter announces he supports the Coalition. Several hours later, Tony Windsor and Rob Oakeshott announce they will support Julia Gillard's Labor government, allowing Gillard to inform the Governor-General that she is able to form a minority government.

=== October ===
- 8 October – The Murray-Darling Basin Authority releases the Guide to the Murray-Darling Basin Plan. The plan proposes to cut water entitlements in the basin by up to 40% and return 4000 GL of water to the river system.
- 17 October – Mary MacKillop is canonised by the Pope Benedict XVI, making her Australia's first Roman Catholic saint (Saint Mary of the Cross).
- 25 October – Environmental activist Peter Gray throws his shoes at former Prime Minister John Howard on the ABC's Q&A programme, in protest to the Howard Government's involvement in the Iraq War.
- Atlas of Living Australia website launched.

=== November ===
- 4 November – Qantas Flight 32 suffers an uncontained engine failure and makes an emergency landing at Singapore Changi Airport. The failure was the first of its kind for the Airbus A380.
- 27 November – A state election is held in Victoria. The Liberal/National coalition led by Ted Baillieu wins a two-seat majority.

=== December ===
- 15 December – A boat carrying up to 80 asylum seekers crashes into a cliff face on Christmas Island, killing at least 30.
- 16–20 December – The Gascoyne River in Western Australia was affected by major flooding, inundating houses in Carnarvon.
- December 2010 – January 2011 – Around 200,000 people in 22 cities and towns across Queensland are affected by floods, most widespread flooding disaster in Queensland history.

=== Full date unknown ===
- Alex Watts & the Foreign Tongue, rock band from Melbourne is formed.

== Arts ==
- 26 March – Sam Leach wins the Archibald Prize for portraiture for his painting of musical comedian Tim Minchin.

== Science and technology ==
- 13 June – The Japanese space probe Hayabusa lands in the Woomera Prohibited Area in South Australia, after returning to Earth with samples from the asteroid 25143 Itokawa.

== Film ==
- 11 December – The 52nd Australian Film Institute Awards are presented. The film Animal Kingdom wins ten awards (including three industry awards presented the night before).

== Sport ==
- 12–28 February – Australia sends a team of 40 competitors to the 2010 Winter Olympics in Vancouver, Canada. Two Australians win gold medals, Torah Bright in the Women's halfpipe and Lydia Lassila in the Women's aerials.
- 13 February – The inaugural NRL All Stars match is held at Skilled Park in the Gold Coast, with the Indigenous All Stars defeating the NRL All Stars 16–12. Indigenous halfback Johnathan Thurston wins the inaugural Preston Campbell award for player of the match.
- 14 February – Sydney FC defeats Melbourne Victory 2–0 in the final match of the home-and-away season of the 2009–10 A-League, securing the club its second A-League premiership and a spot in the 2011 AFC Champions League.
- 28 February – 2009 NRL premiers the Melbourne Storm defeat Super League XIV champions the Leeds Rhinos 18–10 in the 2010 World Club Challenge. The win, as well as the Storm's premiership and minor premiership wins since 2006, would be later revoked in April following the club's salary cap breach.
- 13 March – Australia defeats Germany 2–1 in the final of the 2010 Men's Hockey World Cup at Dhyan Chand National Stadium, in New Delhi, India. This is Australia's second World Cup title.
- 20 March – Sydney FC defeats Melbourne Victory in the 2010 A-League Grand Final at Etihad Stadium to add the A-League Championship to their Premiership. Sydney FC wins 4–2 on penalties, after the match is tied at 1–1 after extra time.
- 21 March – Victoria win their 28th Sheffield Shield title, defeating Queensland by 457 runs at the Melbourne Cricket Ground.
- 21–24 March – The 2010 UCI Track Cycling World Championships are held in Copenhagen, Denmark. Australia tops the medal table, winning 6 gold medals, 2 silver and 2 bronze.
- 28 March – British driver Jenson Button wins the 2010 Australian Grand Prix for McLaren, his second successive victory in the race. He finishing 12 seconds ahead of Polish driver Robert Kubica.
- 22 April – The Melbourne Storm are stripped of their 2007 and 2009 National Rugby League premierships and 2006–2008 minor premierships, fined a record $1.689 million, deducted all eight premiership points for the 2010 season and barred from receiving premiership points for the rest of the season after systematic breaches of the NRL salary cap were discovered.
- 4 May – Neil Robertson defeats Scotland's Graeme Dott 18–13 to win the 2010 World Snooker Championship.
- 16 May – Australia wins the 2010 ICC Women's World Twenty20 defeating New Zealand by 3 runs in the final at Bridgetown, Barbados. In the corresponding men's event, Australia finish runners-up, losing the final to England by 7 wickets.
- 30 May – The Australian team wins the 2010 AFC Women's Asian Cup, defeating North Korea 5–4 on penalties after the two teams were level on 1–1 after extra time.
- 10 June – Football Federation Australia withdraws Australia's bid to host the 2018 FIFA World Cup, but continues to bid for the 2022 event.
- 12 June – Timana Tahu withdraws from the New South Wales team for the second match of the 2010 State of Origin series after assistant coach Andrew Johns made racially disparaging comments about Queensland player Greg Inglis.
- 23 June – Despite defeating Serbia 2–1 in their final match in Group D, Australia did not progress past the group stages of the 2010 FIFA World Cup—finishing third in their group behind Ghana on goal difference.
- 5 August – Melbourne Heart FC plays its first match in the A-League. It is defeated 0–1 by Central Coast Mariners at AAMI Park.
- 5 September – The St. George Illawarra Dragons win their second straight, and most recent, minor premiership following the final main round of the 2010 NRL season. Following the Melbourne Storm's stripping of team points in April after their salary cap breach, they are relegated to last position by default.
- 20 September – Carlton player Chris Judd wins his second Brownlow Medal.
- 25 September – The 2010 AFL Grand Final is a draw between Collingwood and St Kilda.
- 2 October – Collingwood wins the replay of the 2010 AFL Grand Final, defeating St Kilda 16.12 (108) to 7.10 (52).
- 3 October – The St. George Illawarra Dragons defeat the Sydney Roosters 32–8 in the 2010 NRL Grand Final to win the 103rd NSWRL/ARL/NRL premiership. The win is the Dragons' first in any incarnation since 1979.
- 10 October – Craig Lowndes and Mark Skaife win the 2010 Supercheap Auto Bathurst 1000 ahead of Triple Eight Race Engineering Holden teammates Jamie Whincup and Steve Owen. It was Lowndes' fifth victory at Bathurst and Skaife's sixth, and the first team 1–2 finish since 1984.
- 17 October – Ducati Corse rider Casey Stoner took a popular home crowd victory in the 2010 Australian motorcycle Grand Prix, finishing eight seconds ahead of Spanish rider Jorge Lorenzo for the Yamaha Motor Racing team.
- 23 October – So You Think wins the Cox Plate for a second time at Moonee Valley.
- 1 November – Surfer Stephanie Gilmore wins the 2010 ASP World Tour, her fourth world championship.
- 2 November – French horse Americain, ridden by Gérald Mossé, wins the 150th Melbourne Cup.
- 2 December – Australia's bid to host the 2022 FIFA World Cup is unsuccessful, with Qatar selected as the location for the 2022 event.
- 26–29 December – England win the fourth Test and retain The Ashes.
- 28 December – Wild Oats XI takes line honours for the fifth time in the 2010 Sydney to Hobart Yacht Race, although a protest is unsuccessfully raised over the yacht's failure to report its position by radio as it entered Bass Strait at Green Cape.

== Births ==
- 5 April – Arisa Trew, skateboarder

== Deaths ==
- 8 January – Monica Maughan, 76, stage, film and television actor.
- 10 January – Bill Patterson, 86, racing driver and businessman.
- 12 January – Ken Colbung, 78, Aboriginal elder
- 18 January – Cyril Burke, 84, rugby union player
- 22 January – Betty Wilson, 88, cricketer
- 25 January – Lynn Bayonas, 66, writer and producer
- 27 January – George Hanlon, 92, racehorse trainer
- 2 February – Nelli Shkolnikova, 83, violinist
- 3 February – John McCallum, 91, actor and television producer
- 13 February – Ken Emerson, 79, cartoonist
- 13 February – Jock Ferguson, 64, union leader and politician
- 15 February – Ian Gray, 46, soccer player
- 18 February – Ruby Hunter, 55, singer
- 21 February – Robert Woodward, 86, architect and fountain designer
- 26 February – Tom Bass, 93, sculptor
- 28 February – Phillip Law, 97, scientist and explorer
- 9 March – Lionel Cox, 80, cyclist
- 15 March – Patricia Wrightson, 88, writer
- 20 March – Chicka Dixon, 81, Aboriginal activist
- 24 March – Ron Hamence, 94, cricketer, member of The Invincibles
- 26 March – Rocco Pantaleo, 53, restaurateur (La Porchetta)
- 2 April – Lady Sonia McMahon, 77, socialite and wife of William McMahon
- 13 April – Bernie Kilgariff, 86, Northern Territory politician
- 15 April – Sir Edward Woodward, 81, judge
- 18 April – Viewed, 6, racehorse, winner of the 2008 Melbourne Cup
- 18 April – William Yates, 88, politician
- 19 April – Carl Williams, 39, murderer
- 21 April – Sir Laurence Muir, 85, businessman and philanthropist
- 23 April – Georgia Lee, 89, jazz and blues singer
- 23 April – Peter Porter, 81, poet
- 29 April – Kevin Humphreys, 80, rugby league administrator
- 2 May – Andrew McFarlane, 33, motocross racer
- 2 May – Murray Nicoll, 66, journalist and broadcaster, Ash Wednesday fires commentator
- 3 May – Merv McIntosh, 87, Australian rules footballer
- 10 May – Jeff Shaw, 60, New South Wales Attorney-General and Supreme Court judge
- 13 May – Peter Provan, 73, rugby league footballer
- 18 May – Don Day, 86, politician
- 21 May – Adrian Cruickshank, 73, politician
- 25 May – Alan Hickinbotham, 84, Australian rules footballer and businessman
- 29 May – Randolph Stow, 74, writer
- 30 May – Dame Pat Evison, 86, television actress
- 2 June – Michael Schildberger, 72, journalist
- 7 June – Adriana Xenides, 54, television personality
- 18 June – John Whitelaw, 89, soldier
- 20 June – Ken Talbot, 59, businessman
- 28 June – Peter Bowers, 80, journalist
- 4 July – Alf Howard, 104, explorer
- 7 July – Brian O'Shaughnessy, 84, philosopher
- 9 July – Jessica Anderson, 93, writer
- 14 July – Charles Mackerras, 84, conductor
- 19 July – Jon Cleary, 92, novelist
- 19 July – David Warren, 85, inventor of the flight data recorder
- 26 July – Sir Brian Bell, 82, businessman in Papua New Guinea
- 27 July – Alan Gilbert, 65, historian and education administrator
- 28 July – Thomas Anderson, Olympic sailor
- 30 July – Roy Smith, New South Wales politician
- 2 August – Ian Castles, 75, statistician, economist and public servant
- 4 August – Jim Kennan, 64, lawyer and politician, Deputy Premier of Victoria (1990–1992)
- 5 August – Sue Napier, 62, politician, Deputy Premier of Tasmania (1996–1998)
- 6 August – Jeff McLean, 63, rugby union footballer
- 30 August – Myrtle Edwards, 89, cricketer and softball player
- 13 September – Gus Williams, 73, musician
- 23 September – Malcolm Douglas, 69, bushman and documentary maker
- 6 October – David Rowbotham, 86, writer
- 10 October – Dame Joan Sutherland, 83, opera singer (died in Switzerland)
- 17 October – Ken Wriedt, 83, ALP politician
- 21 October – Sir Leslie Froggatt, 90, businessman
- 4 November – James Freud, 51, musician (Models)
- 14 November – Bobbi Sykes, 67, Aboriginal rights activist
- 16 November – Louis Bisdee, 100, politician
- 22 November – Frank Fenner, 95, scientist
- 26 November – Kevin Parry, 77, businessman
- 6 December – Norman Hetherington, 89, cartoonist and creator of Mr. Squiggle
- 7 December – Gus Mercurio, 82, actor
- 8 December – John James, 76, Australian rules footballer
- 13 December – James Dibble, 87, television presenter
- 14 December – Ruth Park, 93, author
- 15 December – Stan "Pops" Heal, 90, Australian rules footballer
- 16 December – Reg Hope, 83, Tasmanian politician
- 16 December – Ruth Park, 93, writer
- 25 December – Gavin Brown, 68, academic
- 25 December – Maurice Rioli, 53, Australian rules footballer

== See also ==
- 2010 in Australian literature
- 2010 in Australian television
- List of Australian films of 2010
