= List of Australian films of 2012 =

== 2012 ==
Title	Director	Cast (subject of documentary)	Genre	Notes	Release date
10 Terrorists	Dee McLachlan	Jackie Diamond, Sachin Joab, Richard Cawthorne, Kendal Rae, Matt Hetherington	Comedy	The Picture Tank	29 March
100 Bloody Acres	Colin Cairnes, Cameron Cairnes	Angus Sampson, Damon Herriman, Oliver Ackland, Anna McGahan	Comedy, horror	Hopscotch International; Doppelganger Releasing	4 August
Any Questions for Ben?	Rob Sitch	Josh Lawson, Rachael Taylor, Daniel Henshall, Felicity Ward, Lachy Hulme, Ed Kavalee	Comedy	Roadshow Films	9 February
Bait 3D	Kimble Rendall	Sharni Vinson, Phoebe Tonkin, Xavier Samuel, Julian McMahon, Cariba Heine, Lincoln Lewis	Horror	Paramount Pictures	20 September
Bathing Franky	Owen Elliot	Jancita Day, Bree Desborough, Shaun Goss, Brendan Madigan	Drama	Titan View	26 May
Black & White & Sex	John Winter	Katherine Hicks, Anya Beyersdorf, Valerie Bader, Roxane Wilson	Drama	Titan View	27 January
Careless Love	John Duigan	Nammi Le, Penny McNamee, Ivy Mak, David Field, Jeff Truman	Drama	Antidote Films	17 May
Crawlspace	Justin Dix	Eddie Baroo, Nicholas Bell, John Brumpton, Ditch Davey, Peta Sergeant	Action, horror	Gryphon Entertainment	11 October
Dark Shadows	Tim Burton	Johnny Depp, Michelle Pfeiffer, Helena Bonham Carter, Eva Green, Jackie Earle Haley, Jonny Lee Miller, Chloë Grace Moretz, Bella Heathcote	Dark fantasy	Warner Bros. Pictures; Based on the TV series	11 May
Dead Europe	Tony Krawitz	Ewen Leslie, Marton Csokas, Kodi Smit-McPhee, Jean-François Balmer	Drama	Transmission Films	14 June
Housos vs. Authority	Paul Fenech	Elle Dawe, Jabba, Paul Fenech, Russell Gilbert, Alex Romano, Kev Taumata, Vanessa Davis	Comedy	Transmission Films; Based on the TV series	1 November
Isolate	Martyn Park	Jacinta John, Terry Serio, Stephen Anderton	Drama, horror	Titan View	22 August
Kath & Kimderella	Ted Emery	Gina Riley, Jane Turner, Magda Szubanski, Glenn Robbins, Peter Rowsthorn, Rob Sitch, Barry Humphries, Alex Perry	Comedy	Roadshow Films; Based on the TV series	6 September
The King is Dead	Rolf de Heer	Roman Vaculik, Michaela Cantwell, Lily Adey, Nathan Hoare, Kerry Ann Reid	Comedy, Thriller	Pinnacle Films	12 July
Last Dance	David Pulbrook	Firass Dirani, Julia Blake, Alan Hopgood	Thriller	Becker Films	19 August
Mental	P. J. Hogan	Toni Collette, Anthony LaPaglia, Rebecca Gibney, Lily Sullivan, Bethany Whitmore	Comedy	Universal Pictures	4 October
Not Suitable for Children	Peter Templeman	Ryan Kwanten, Sarah Snook, Ryan Corr, Bojana Novakovic	Romantic comedy	Icon Film Distribution	12 July
The Sapphires	Wayne Blair	Chris O'Dowd, Deborah Mailman, Jessica Mauboy, Shari Sebbens	Musical comedy	Hopscotch Films; Based on the stage play of the same name by Tony Briggs	9 August
Satellite Boy	Catriona McKenzie	David Gulpilil, Cameron Wallaby, Joseph Pedley, Rohanna Angus	Drama	Satellite Films	10 December
Save Your Legs!	Boyd Hicklin	Damon Gameau, Stephen Curry, Brendan Cowell, Brenton Thwaites	Comedy	Madman Entertainment	19 August
Scumbus	Luke Tierney	Ed Kavalee, Toby Truslove, Lachy Hulme, Henry Nixon, Christian Clark, Glenn Robbins	Comedy		10 November
Storm Surfers 3D	Justin McMillan, Christopher Nelius	Ross Clarke-Jones, Tom Carroll	Documentary	6ixty Foot Films, Firelight Productions, Red Bull Films	14 August
The Things My Father Never Taught Me	Burleigh Smith	Burleigh Smith, Aiden Papamihail, Bridie Carter	Comedy	Wavebreaker	1 March
Thirst	Robert Carter	Victoria Haralabidou, Myles Pollard, Hanna Mangan-Lawrence	Drama	Imagine Films	7 January
Wish You Were Here	Kieran Darcy-Smith	Joel Edgerton, Felicty Price, Teresa Palmer, Antony Starr	Drama	Hopscotch Films	26 April

== See also ==
- 2012 in Australia
- 2012 in Australian television
- List of 2012 box office number-one films in Australia
