= List of Australian films of 2010 =

== 2010 ==
Title	Director	Cast	Genre	Notes
1MC:Something of Vengeance	Martyn Park	Liliya May, Laurence Coy, Terry Serio, James Elliott	Comedy, revenge	
Animal Kingdom	David Michôd	Ben Mendelsohn, Joel Edgerton, Guy Pearce		AACTA Award for Best Film
Beneath Hill 60	Jeremy Sims	Brendan Cowell	Drama	
Blame	Michael Henry	Kestie Morassi, Sophie Lowe, Simon Stone, Mark Winter, Damian de Montemas, Ashley Zukerman	Drama, thriller	
Bran Nue Dae	Rachel Perkins	Rocky McKenzie, Jessica Mauboy, Ernie Dingo, Missy Higgins, Geoffrey Rush	Comedy, musical	
Cats & Dogs: The Revenge of Kitty Galore	Brad Peyton	James Marsden, Nick Nolte, Christina Applegate, Katt Williams, Bette Midler, Roger Moore, Neil Patrick Harris, Chris O'Donnell, Sean Hayes, Michael Clarke Duncan, Jack McBrayer, Wallace Shawn	Spy	
The Clinic	James Rabbitts	Tabrett Bethell, Andy Whitfield	Thriller	
Griff the Invisible	Leon Ford	Ryan Kwanten, Maeve Dermody, Toby Schmitz, Heather Mitchell	Comedy / Drama	
I Love You Too	Daina Reid	Brendan Cowell, Peter Dinklage, Yvonne Strahovski, Peter Helliar, Megan Gale	Romantic comedy	
Joffa: The Movie	Chris Liontos	Joffa Corfe	Comedy	
Lou	Belinda Chayko	John Hurt, Emily Barclay, Lily Bell Tindley	Drama	
The Nothing Men	Mark Fitzpatrick	David Field, Colin Friels	Thriller	
Oranges and Sunshine	Jim Loach	Hugo Weaving, David Wenham, Emily Watson	Drama	
Red Hill	Patrick Hughes	Ryan Kwanten, Steve Bisley, Tom E. Lewis, Claire van der Boom	Thriller, western	
Road Train	Dean Francis	Xavier Samuel, Bob Morley, Sophie Lowe, Georgina Haig	Horror	
$quid	Daley Pearson, Luke Tierney	Josh Lawson, Ed Kavalee, Christian Clark, Henry Nixon, Lauren Lillie, Brooke Sheehan	Comedy	
Summer Coda	Richard Gray	Rachael Taylor, Andy McPhee, Alex Dimitriades	Drama	
Then She Was Gone	Burleigh Smith	Burleigh Smith, Sarah Louella	Comedy, drama	
Tomorrow, When the War Began	Stuart Beattie	Caitlin Stasey, Lincoln Lewis, Rachel Hurd-Wood, Chris Pang, Deniz Akdeniz, Andy Ryan, Phoebe Tonkin, Ashleigh Cummings	War	
Wog Boy 2: The Kings of Mykonos	Nick Giannopoulos	Vince Colosimo, Zeta Makripoulia, Costas Kilias, Alex Dimitriades, Kevin Sorbo	Comedy	

== See also ==
- 2010 in Australia
- 2010 in Australian television
- List of 2010 box office number-one films in Australia
