= 2012 in Australia =

- Monarch: Elizabeth II
- Governor-General: Quentin Bryce
- Prime minister: Julia Gillard
- Elections: QLD, NT, ACT

The following lists events that happened during 2012 in Australia.

- Decades: 1990s; 2000s; 2010s; 2020s; 2030s
- See also: 2012 in Australian television; 2012 in Australian literature; Other events of 2012; Timeline of Australian history

== Incumbents ==
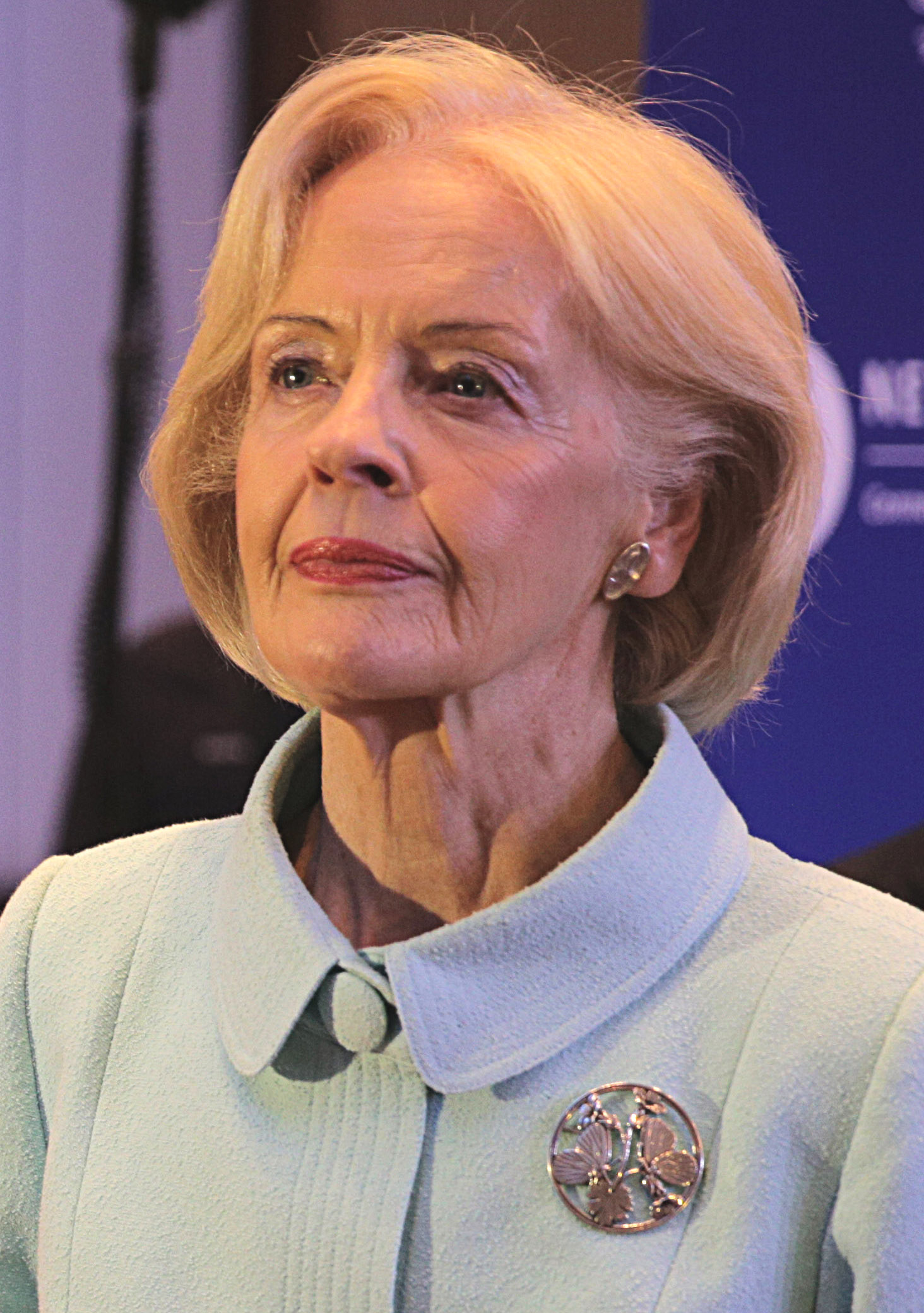
Quentin Bryce

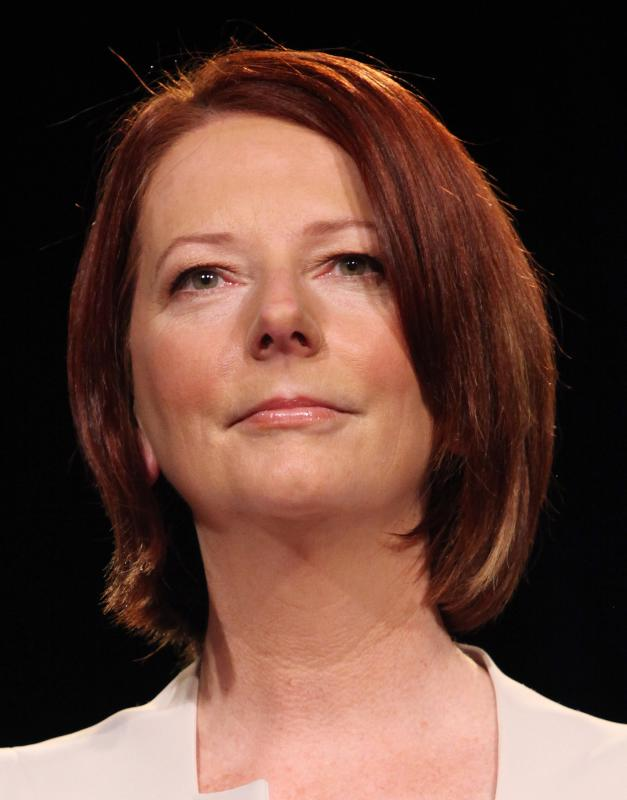
Julia Gillard

- Monarch – Elizabeth II
- Governor-General – Quentin Bryce
- Prime Minister – Julia Gillard
  - Deputy Prime Minister – Wayne Swan
  - Opposition Leader – Tony Abbott
- Chief Justice – Robert French

=== State and territory leaders ===
- Premier of New South Wales – Barry O'Farrell
  - Opposition Leader – John Robertson
- Premier of Queensland – Anna Bligh (until 26 March), then Campbell Newman
  - Opposition Leader – Jeff Seeney (until 26 March), then Annastacia Palaszczuk
- Premier of South Australia – Jay Weatherill
  - Opposition Leader – Isobel Redmond
- Premier of Tasmania – Lara Giddings
  - Opposition Leader – Will Hodgman
- Premier of Victoria – Ted Baillieu
  - Opposition Leader – Daniel Andrews
- Premier of Western Australia – Colin Barnett
  - Opposition Leader – Eric Ripper (until 23 January), then Mark McGowan
- Chief Minister of the Australian Capital Territory – Katy Gallagher
  - Opposition Leader – Zed Seselja
- Chief Minister of the Northern Territory – Paul Henderson (until 29 August), then Terry Mills
  - Opposition Leader – Terry Mills (until 29 August), then Delia Lawrie
- Chief Minister of Norfolk Island – David Buffett

=== Governors and administrators ===
- Governor of New South Wales – Marie Bashir
- Governor of Queensland – Penelope Wensley
- Governor of South Australia – Kevin Scarce
- Governor of Tasmania – Peter Underwood
- Governor of Victoria – Alex Chernov
- Governor of Western Australia – Malcolm McCusker
- Administrator of the Australian Indian Ocean Territories – Brian Lacy (until 5 October), then Jon Stanhope
- Administrator of Norfolk Island – Owen Walsh (until 1 April), then Neil Pope
- Administrator of the Northern Territory – Sally Thomas

== Events ==
=== Whole year ===
- Australian Year of the Farmer

=== January ===
- 12 January – Category 2 Tropical Cyclone Heidi battered Western Australia's Pilbara region bringing disruption to the local iron ore industry, damaging roofs, bringing down trees, and cutting power to at least 3,500 people.
- 18 January - Sam Moran leaves The Wiggles after having been wearing the yellow skivvy since 2006. As a result, Greg Page makes a return to the group.
- 26 January – Prime Minister Julia Gillard and Leader of the Opposition Tony Abbott are evacuated by a security detail from a celebratory function when a protest by supporters of the Aboriginal Tent Embassy threatened to turn violent.

=== February ===
- 3 February – The Mehi River at Moree, in northern New South Wales breaks its banks, flooding much of the town. Around 1,600 people are evacuated from their homes. Other towns affected by the flooding include Wee Waa, Pallamallawa and Biniguy. In south west Queensland, the Maranoa River floods the town of Mitchell, inundating 100 homes and threatens to flood downstream Roma.
- 6 February – Diamond Jubilee of Elizabeth II's accession as Queen of Australia
- 17 February – Air Australia's fleet is grounded as the budget airline goes into voluntary administration.
- 27 February – The Federal Parliamentary Australian Labor Party holds a ballot to determine its leader and by extension the Prime Minister of Australia. Julia Gillard wins the ballot by 71 votes to Kevin Rudd's 31 votes.

=== March ===
- 20 March – A tornado destroys houses and injures nine people in the Townsville suburb of Vincent.
- 24 March – The Queensland state election is held. Anna Bligh's Labor government is defeated heavily, with the Liberal National Party led by Campbell Newman winning the largest parliamentary majority in the state's history.
- 31 March – Genieve Blackwell is the first woman appointed as an Anglican bishop in New South Wales.

=== April ===
- 22 April – Peter Slipper stands aside as Speaker of the House of Representatives while a civil claim of sexual harassment is dealt with by the Federal Court.
- 28 April – Graham Quirk wins the 2012 Brisbane City Council election to remain as Lord Mayor.

=== May ===
- 17 May – Three members of The Wiggles, Greg Page, Murray Cook and Jeff Fatt, announced that they will retire at the end of the year and will be replaced by Emma Watkins (yellow skivvy), Simon Pryce (red skivvy) and Lachlan Gillespie (purple skivvy) respectively.

=== June ===
- 5 June – Record rainfall across much of Gippsland leads to flooding in Traralgon. Omeo records its wettest day since records began 133 years ago—133 millimetres (5.2 in).
- 12 June – A fourth coronial inquest into the disappearance of Azaria Chamberlain rules that a dingo took the infant from an Uluru campsite in 1980.
- 14 June – The world's largest network of marine parks in offshore waters is announced by Environment Minister Tony Burke.
- 18 June – Fairfax Media—the publishers of The Age and The Sydney Morning Herald—announce plans to cut 1900 jobs and to reformat both papers to a compact tabloid size.
- 19 June – A minor earthquake shakes Melbourne and much of regional Victoria. The epicentre of the 5.4 magnitude earthquake was around 10 kilometres (6.2 mi) south west of the Gippsland town of Moe.

=== July ===
- 1 July – A carbon pricing scheme is introduced in Australia, which will charge a group of "liable entities" $23 per tonne of carbon emissions they produce in the 2012–13 financial year.

=== August ===
- 15 August – The High Court of Australia rules in the cases JT International SA v Commonwealth of Australia and British American Tobacco Australasia Limited & Ors v Commonwealth of Australia that the government's plain cigarette packaging legislation was not contrary to s 51 (xxxi) of the Australian Constitution, which empowers the Parliament to make laws with respect to "the acquisition of property on just terms".
- 25 August – A general election is held in the Northern Territory. Paul Henderson's Labor government is defeated by the Country Liberal Party led by Terry Mills.

=== September ===
- 15 September – 2012 Sydney Islamic Riots erupt in response to an American anti-Islamic film.

=== October ===
- 9 October – Peter Slipper resigns as Speaker of the House of Representatives. Anna Burke is elected the new Speaker.
- 20 October – A general election is held in the Australian Capital Territory. The Labor Party led by Katy Gallagher retains minority government with the support of the only remaining Greens MLA, Shane Rattenbury.
- 31 October – Groundbreaking occurs at Australia's largest master planned community, Ecco Ripley.

=== November ===
- 1 November – Daniel Keighran is awarded the Victoria Cross for Australia for his actions of 24 August 2010 during the Battle of Derapet, part of Operation Slipper in the War in Afghanistan.
- 12 November – Prime Minister Julia Gillard announces the creation of a national Royal Commission into institutional responses to instances of child sexual abuse.
- 14 November – Total solar eclipse in northern Australia.

=== December ===
- 1 December –
  - The Federal Government's plain packaging laws for cigarettes come into force, meaning that cigarettes must be sold in olive-green packets with graphic health warnings.
- 2 December –
  - Prime Minister Julia Gillard announces a plan to cut the cost of electricity in Australian households.
  - West Australian Transport Minister Troy Buswell announces a $500 million road package for the northern suburbs which will include an extension to the Mitchell Freeway.
- 3 December –
  - A disabled woman interrupts a speech by Prime Minister Julia Gillard to National Disability Services chief executives in Sydney to voice her frustration at eligibility criteria for the disability support pension.
  - Assistant Treasurer David Bradbury releases the interim response to the Federal Government's taskforce on whether the current GST threshold of $1,000 should be lowered on goods bought online from overseas and advises that lowering the threshold would not be cost-effective, particularly for with the volume of work for Customs and Australia Post.
  - Food company, Rosella, goes into receivership.
  - The South Australian Director of Public Prosecutions tells the Court of Criminal Appeal that his office will mount fresh criminal proceedings against a boy who was accused of murdering South Australian woman Pirjo Kemppainen in September 2010.
  - Former West Australian Premier Brian Burke is found not guilty of illegally obtaining confidential government information.
- 4 December –
  - 2DayFM presenters Mel Greig and Michael Christian make a prank call to the King Edward VII's Hospital, which was treating the Duchess of Cambridge, and pose as Queen Elizabeth II and Prince Charles. Nurse Jacintha Saldanha answers the phone before transferring the call to a colleague, who divulged details of the Duchess's bout of acute morning sickness.
  - Senator John Faulkner calls for major reform within the New South Wales Labor branch, including electoral funding reform and the establishment of a parliamentary code of conduct.
  - The Reserve Bank of Australia cuts rates by 25 points back to the historic law of 3%. The Australian dollar remains firmly above $US 1.0472.
  - The Northern Territory Government reconfirms its promise to spend hundreds of millions of dollars on indigenous communities and then increase motor vehicle registration by $48 a year.
  - 17-year-old Brisbane resident, Harrison Kadell, dies in Fiji in a resort swimming pool while on an end-of-school holiday.
- 6 December –
  - The Federal Government secures a $6 billion funding deal with New South Wales to begin the National Disability Insurance Scheme in 2018.
  - Detective Inspector Bryson Anderson is stabbed in Oakville, Sydney while dealing with a dispute between neighbours. He later dies in hospital and Mitch and Fiona Barbieri are charged over his death.
- 7 December –
  - A funeral for Daniel Morcombe is held at Sippy Downs.
  - The Council of Australian Governments (COAG) Meeting is held. The governments agree to a plan to ease electricity costs, but are reluctant to commit funds to the National Disability Insurance Scheme. They also debated the issue of removing the gender bias from the monarchy succession rules.
  - An armed robber who led police on a high speed chase through the Valley Fiveways in 2011 and created 4 days of mayhem is arrested.
  - Jacintha Saldana commits suicide and 2 Day FM says that Michael Christian and Mel Grieg are "completely shattered".
- 8 December –
  - Five people die after a horrific crash on the M1 at Coomera.
  - Five young friends travelling to Melbourne die when their car crashes during their journey from Geelong.
- 10 December –
  - Mel Greig and Michael Christian give their first interviews since Jacintha Saldanha's death, telling Nine Network's A Current Affair and Seven Network's Today Tonight that they are still badly shaken over the tragedy
  - A boat shed near Jacobs Well, Queensland catches fire and 230 boats are destroyed.
- 11 December –
  - Queensland Premier Campbell Newman promises that there will be no more public sector job cuts after the current target of 14,000 jobs is met.
  - Protective Services Officer James Vongvixay is brutally attacked with a hammer on the steps of Parliament House Melbourne, requiring him to undergo surgery to mend a fractured skull.
- 12 December –
  - The Federal Court of Australia rules that the case brought against former House of Representatives Speaker Peter Slipper by James Ashby is an "abuse of process", declaring that its predominant purpose was to cause "significant public, reputational and political damage".
  - Thousands attend the funeral for slain Detective Inspector Bryson Anderson at St. Patrick's Cathedral, Parramatta.
  - Summer thunderstorms and once-in-100-year rains wreak havoc across the southern half of Western Australia affecting properties near the Collie River.
  - The Queensland Government offers to join the National Disability Insurance Scheme, with Premier Campbell Newman offering $1.77 billion to roll out the scheme in Queensland from 2018. The Federal Government says it is a step in the right direction but the offer is well short of what's required.
- 13 December –
  - The Queensland Government announces a $5 million commission of inquiry to investigate the state's failed health payroll system. The inquiry will investigate what went wrong with the IT system.
  - The Administrative Decisions Tribunal orders that radio broadcaster Alan Jones apologise on-air next week for describing Lebanese Muslims as "vermin" and mongrels" seven-and-a-half years ago.
  - New South Wales Premier Barry O'Farrell announces the Government's New South Wales Long-Term Transport Master Plan, including Sydney's Light Rail Future, which commits the Government to commencing construction on a light rail line from Central to Randwick before the next election. Another rail crossing over Sydney Harbour will be built after the north-west rail link is finished at the end of the decade.
- 14 December –
  - The United Nations High Commissioner for Refugees severely criticises the conditions and treatment of asylum seekers at the Nauru Detention Centre.
  - The South Australian Government releases another three cases of sex abuse allegations in public schools, but says it will not inform the parents at two schools until the new school year.
  - Two Queensland unions lose their legal battle with the Queensland Government over job security laws. The Queensland Government has amended the Public Service and Industrial Relations Acts, removing job security clauses in agreements for public sector workers.
  - A new report from the Organisation for Economic Cooperation and Development calls Australia the "Iron Man of advanced nations", but warns that the Federal Government should abandon its plan to return the budget to surplus this financial year if the global and local economies slow down further.
  - Gerard Baden-Clay is denied bail and the Supreme Court of Queensland releases the diary entries of his deceased wife Allison.
- 17 December –
  - Federal Treasurer Wayne Swan meets with state and territory treasurers. The Commonwealth agrees to do more analysis on cutting the GST threshold for online purchases, but Wayne Swan maintains it will cost more than it delivers.
- 19 December –
  - The Climate Change Authority recommends that the renewable energy target remain unchanged, despite falling electricity demand, but says the target will not be met if Tony Abbott is elected and abandons the carbon tax.
  - West Australian Premier Colin Barnett criticises the Federal Government for delaying a decision on what would be the state's first proper uranium mine, in the northern Goldfields.
  - SkyCity commits more than $300 million to transform the Adelaide Casino, including a huge increase in gambling operations. South Australian Premier Jay Weatherill praises the expansion on the basis that it will create a further 500 construction jobs and would make the Riverbank precinct "a world-class entertainment precinct".
  - The Federal Government confirms that Prime Minister Julia Gillard will formally apologise to children of forced adoptions at Parliament House on 21 March 2013.
  - Federal Opposition Leader Tony Abbott explains during a press conference that he has been too busy "doing very important things" in London to have read the week-old judgment dismissing a sexual harassment claim against former speaker Peter Slipper.
- 20 December –
  - Federal Treasurer Wayne Swan releases the Mid-Year Economic and Fiscal Outlook (MYEFO) which reveals that a budget surplus in the 2012–13 financial year will be unlikely after new figures showed a $4 billion write down in cash receipts during the first four months of the financial year.
  - The Australian share market hits an 18-month high.
  - After almost six weeks in court, the Supreme Court of the Northern Territory finds Brownyn Buttery, Christopher Malyshko and Zac Grieve guilty of carrying out the contract killing of Katherine man Ray Niceforo in 2011.
  - The Wilderness Society launches legal action against the West Australian Government's proposed gas hub near Broome.
  - South Australian Treasurer Jack Snelling releases the state's 2012–13 Mid-Year Budget Review (MYBR) and announces that the Government is still on track for a Budget surplus in 2015–16, albeit reduced to $468 million from the $512 million surplus that was forecast in the 2012–13 Budget. Mr. Snelling also announces that the Government will axe another 2,000 public service jobs due to significant revenue write downs which include lower than projected GST collections and continued pressures on the Health Budget.
- 21 December –
  - Queensland Attorney-General Jarrod Bleijie announces an independent review into the evidence against Graham Stafford in the 1991 murder of schoolgirl Leanne Holland. The findings are to be released in early 2013.
  - West Australian Treasurer Troy Buswell delivers the state's Mid-Year Budget showing that the Government is expecting to post a modest surplus of $140 million for the 2012–13 financial year and an estimated debt level of $18.2 billion.
  - Queensland Treasurer Tim Nicholls announces that Cbus Property has been awarded the $653 million tender to construct the new government building at 1 William Street, Brisbane, to be 43 storeys, making it the tallest building in the city.

== Arts and literature ==
- 30 March – Tim Storrier is awarded the Archibald Prize for his faceless self-portrait The Histrionic Wayfarer (after Bosch). The Wynne Prize was awarded to Imants Tillers for Waterfall (after Williams) and the Sulman Prize was awarded to Nigel Milsom for Judo House pt4 (Golden mud).
- 20 June – Anna Funder is awarded the Miles Franklin Award for her novel All That I Am.

== Sport ==
- 28 January – Tennis: Victoria Azarenka wins the women's singles title at the 2012 Australian Open, defeating Maria Sharapova.
- 28 January – Cricket: Sydney Sixers defeat Perth Scorchers by seven wickets in the final of the 2011–12 Big Bash League at the WACA Ground.
- 29 January – Tennis: Novak Djokovic wins the men's singles title at the 2012 Australian Open, defeating Rafael Nadal.
- 4 February – Rugby league: The 2012 All Stars match is held at Skilled Park with the NRL All Stars defeating the Indigenous All Stars 36–28. Indigenous winger Nathan Merritt of the South Sydney Rabbitohs wins the Preston Campbell award for Man of the Match.
- 12 February – Baseball: Perth Heat defeat Melbourne Aces 7–6 in the 13th inning in the third and deciding game of the championship series and claim the 2012 Australian Baseball League championship.
- 13 February – Rugby league: The 2012 Women's All Stars match is held at Suncorp Stadium.
- 17 February – Rugby league: 2011 NRL premiers the Manly-Warringah Sea Eagles are defeated by Super League XVI champions the Leeds Rhinos 26–12 at the 2012 World Club Challenge, held in Leeds.
- 25 February – Cricket: The South Australian Redbacks tied with the Tasmanian Tigers in the final of the 2011–12 Ryobi One-Day Cup at the Adelaide Oval, but the Redbacks won on a count back. The win was South Australia's first One-Day domestic title in 25 years.
- 29 February – Soccer: Football Federation Australia revokes the A-League licence of Gold Coast United FC.
- 11 March – Basketball: Dandenong Rangers defeat Bulleen Boomers 94–70 in the Grand Final of the 2011–12 Women's National Basketball League.
- 18 March – Motor racing: British driver Jenson Button of McLaren wins the 2012 Australian Grand Prix.
- 19 March – Cricket: Queensland defeat Tasmania by three wickets in the final of the 2011–12 Sheffield Shield.
- 9 April – Athletics: Matt Wiltshire wins the men's event at the 131st Stawell Gift. The women's event was won by Melissa Breen.
- 22 April – Soccer: A last minute penalty sees Brisbane Roar FC defeat Perth Glory FC 2–1 in the 2012 A-League Grand Final.
- 23 May – Rugby league: The Queensland Maroons defeat the NSW Blues 18–10 at Etihad Stadium in the first match of the 2012 State of Origin series. Maroons second-rower Nate Myles is awarded Man of the Match.
- 13 June – Rugby league: The NSW Blues defeat the Queensland Maroons 16–12 at ANZ Stadium in the second match of the 2012 State of Origin series. Blues second-rower Greg Bird is awarded Man of the Match.
- 4 July – Rugby league: The Queensland Maroons win the 2012 State of Origin series, their seventh consecutive victory, defeating the NSW Blues 21–20 at Suncorp Stadium in the third match. Maroons five-eighth Johnathan Thurston is awarded Man of the Match, while second-rower Nate Myles is awarded the Wally Lewis Medal for player of the series.
- 2 September – Rugby league: The Canterbury-Bankstown Bulldogs win their first minor premiership since 1994 following the final main round of the 2012 NRL season. The Parramatta Eels finish in last position, claiming their first wooden spoon since 1972.
- 24 September – Australian rules football: Jobe Watson (Essendon) wins the 2012 Brownlow Medal.
- 29 September – Australian rules football: The Sydney Swans win the 2012 AFL Grand Final, defeating Hawthorn 14.7 (91) to 11.15 (81).
- 30 September – Rugby league: The Melbourne Storm defeat the Canterbury-Bankstown Bulldogs 14–4 in the 2012 NRL Grand Final. The Clive Churchill Medal for man of the match is awarded to Storm halfback Cooper Cronk. Good Charlotte and The Script headline pre-game entertainment.
- 7 October – Motor racing: Triple Eight Race Engineering Holden Commodore drivers Jamie Whincup and Paul Dumbrell win the 2012 Bathurst 1000 by 0.3 seconds after a late race challenge from the Rod Nash Racing Ford Falcon team of David Reynolds and Dean Canto. Triple Eight's second Commodore of Craig Lowndes and Warren Luff climbed into third place with three laps remaining.
- 6 November – Horse racing: Green Moon, ridden by jockey Brett Prebble, wins the 2012 Melbourne Cup.

== Deaths ==
- 4 January –
  - Sir Archibald Glenn, 100, industrialist, Chancellor of La Trobe University
  - Patricia Mather, 88, zoologist
  - Bob McKenzie, 83, Australian rules footballer (Melbourne)
- 6 January – Spike Pola, 97, football player
- 14 January – Charles Howard, 87, Roman Catholic clergyman
- 15 January –
  - Chris Pavlou, 72, football player
  - Peter Veness, 27, journalist
- 21 January – Jodie-Anne White, 44, dancer and choreographer
- 23 January – Bill Robb, 84, politician, member of the New South Wales Legislative Assembly for Miranda (1978–1984)
- 25 January – Charles Stanmore, 87, Olympic fencer
- 4 February – Andrew Wight, 52, writer and film producer (Sanctum)
- 4 February – Mike DeGruy, 60, filmmaker and cinematographer
- 12 February – Denis Flannery, 83, rugby league footballer
- 17 February – Danny Halloran, 57, Australian rules footballer
- 17 February – Hank Nelson, 74, historian
- 2 March – Sir Keith Jones, 100, surgeon
- 11 March – Ian Turpie, 68, entertainer, TV host (The New Price Is Right)
- 12 March – Douglas Scott, 91, Country politician
- 16 March – Margaret Whitlam, 92, swimmer, activist, wife of Gough Whitlam
- 17 March – Jaye Radisich, 35, Western Australian politician
- 20 March – Jim Stynes, 45, Australian rules footballer and administrator
- 21 March – Lincoln Hall, 56, mountaineer
- 24 March – Vince Lovegrove, 65, musician, band manager and AIDS activist
- 27 March – Dale Baker, 73, South Australian politician
- 29 March – Michael Peterson, 59, surfer
- 30 March – Ron Gaunt, 78, cricketer
- 31 March – Judith Adams, 68, Senator for Western Australia
- 1 April – Lionel Bowen, 89, ALP politician; Deputy Prime Minister (1983–1990)
- 2 April – Jimmy Little, 75, country musician
- 2 April – Warren Bonython, 95, conservationist, explorer, author and chemical engineer
- 6 April – Sheila Scotter, 92, magazine editor, fashion designer, businessperson
- 15 April – Murray Rose, 73, swimmer
- 18 April – Col Saddington, 74, Australian rules footballer (Richmond)
- 19 April – Greg Ham, 58, musician (Men at Work)
- 2 May – Les Mogg, 82, Australian rules footballer (North Melbourne)
- 3 May – Edith Bliss, 52, pop singer and television presenter
- 3 May – Felix Werder, 90, composer
- 9 May – Northerly, race horse, 15
- 10 May – Gulumbu Yunupingu, 69, Aboriginal artist
- 13 May – Don Ritchie, 85, volunteer ("Angel of The Gap")
- 18 May – Peter Jones, 49, drummer (Crowded House)
- 20 May – Robin Gibb, 62, Bee Gee
- 21 May – Alan Thorne, 73, anthropologist
- 5 June – Charlie Sutton, 88, Australian rules footballer and coach
- 12 June – Rolly Tasker, 86, sailor
- 26 June – Daniel Batman, 31, sprinter
- 27 June – Rosemary Dobson, 92, poet
- 30 June – Michael Abney-Hastings, 69, Earl of Loudoun, pretender to the British throne
- 4 July – Peter Bennett, 85, Australian rules footballer (St Kilda) and Olympic water polo player
- 8 July – Rodger Head, 73, Australian rules footballer (St Kilda)
- 23 July – John Treloar, 84, sprinter
- 27 July – Darryl Cotton, 62, musician (Zoot) and television presenter (The Early Bird Show)
- 29 July – Adam Cullen, 46, artist, Archibald Prize winner
- 30 July – Jonathan Hardy, 71, actor
- 6 August – Robert Hughes, 74, art critic, writer (died in New York)
- 13 August – Ray Jordon, 75, cricketer and Australian rules football coach
- 21 August – Gary Mara, 50, rugby league player (died in Los Angeles)
- 23 August – Merv Neagle, 54, Australian rules footballer
- 31 August – Max Bygraves, 89, British entertainer
- 2 September – Bert Worner, 82, Australian football player (Geelong)
- 5 September – Eric Deeral, 79, politician, Queensland MLA for Cook (1974–1977), first Aboriginal member of the Queensland Parliament
- 6 September – Amanda Thane, 59, operatic soprano (death announced on this date)
- 9 September – Ron Taylor, 78, shark expert
- 9 September – John McCarthy, 22, Australian rules footballer (Port Adelaide) (died in Las Vegas)
- 12 September – Whobegotyou, 7, Thoroughbred racehorse
- 4 October – Tom Stannage, 68, historian
- 7 October – Wiley Reed, 68, blues musician
- 9 October – George Paciullo, 78, New South Wales politician
- 14 October – Max Fatchen, 92, journalist and children's writer
- 28 October – Gordon Bilney, 73, politician
- 19 November – Joe Riordan, 82, ALP politician
- 22 November – Bryce Courtenay, 79, author
- 5 December – Dame Elisabeth Murdoch, 103, philanthropist
- 17 December – Tony Charlton, 83, sports broadcaster
- 20 December – Robert Juniper, 83, artist
- 29 December – Tony Greig, 66, cricketer and broadcaster.

== See also ==
- 2012 in Australian literature
- 2012 in Australian television
- List of Australian films of 2012
