= Joffa: The Movie =

- Original release poster
- Directed by: Chris Liontos
- Produced by: Chris Liontos
- Starring: Joffa Corfe; Shane McRae; Bob Maguire; Kevin Bartlett
- Release date: 2 September 2010
- Running time: 85 minutes
- Country: Australia
- Language: English
- Budget: A$200,000

Joffa: The Movie is a 2010 independent Australian buddy movie starring Australian sports fan and convicted sex offender Joffa Corfe. The film was financed by director and producer Chris Liontos. Additional acting roles include performances by actor Shane McRae along with cameos by Bob Maguire and Australian Football Hall of Fame inductee Kevin Bartlett.

The movie was released in Australia for DVD on 2 December 2010 by Madman Entertainment.

== Plot ==
Joffa Corfe and Shane McRae star as a couple of knockabout handymen with a passion for the Collingwood Football Club. The pair is a magnet for trouble, which drives the local priest, Bob Maguire, to the point of despair. Portrayed as an ordinary man, Joffa attracts the affection and hatred of thousands.

== Cast ==
- Joffa Corfe as Himself
- Shane McRae as Shane
- Bob Maguire as Himself
- Kevin Bartlett as Himself

== Production ==
Producer-director Chris Liontos started out by wondering why nobody was making films about football. His inspiration was 1998 movie The Club. He decided to explore the world of Australian rules football "through the eyes of the most passionate supporter in the country."

The budget was less than A$200,000. "I took a risk on fully self-funding this, no grants at all", said Liontos. "A lot of films these days do get a lot of (government) funding. Nobody goes and sees them."

The overseas segments were filmed cheaply, with crew living in backpacker bunk-rooms eating baked beans and having to dodge crack addicts.

== Critical reception ==
The film received a mixed reception. While Collingwood supporters provide uniformly positive reviews, non-Collingwood fans were less than thrilled. Greg King of FilmReviews.net.au said that "the only thing more excruciating than sitting through this film would be to endure watching Collingwood win another premiership."

Professional reviewer Leigh Paatsch said that "With his tatty jacket of gold, albino mullet hairdo and a face made for keeping birds off crops, the infamous general of the Collingwood cheer squad was never going to be your typical movie star." He added that "Joffa is definitely a natural in front of the cameras. Just a shame that those behind the cameras of Joffa: The Movie are not."

The Australian Council on Children and the Media said that Joffa: The Movie is a "light-hearted mockumentary targeting an adult audience, but which may appeal to those adolescents with an interest in football. The film has some funny moments, particularly those involving Father Bob."

Donna Demaio, reporter for The Age, likened the movie to Kenny, another famous Australian mockumentary.

== See also ==
- Cinema of Australia
- List of Australian films
- Australian films of 2010
- List of films set in Australia
- List of films shot in Melbourne
