= Joffa Corfe =

Australian rules football supporter

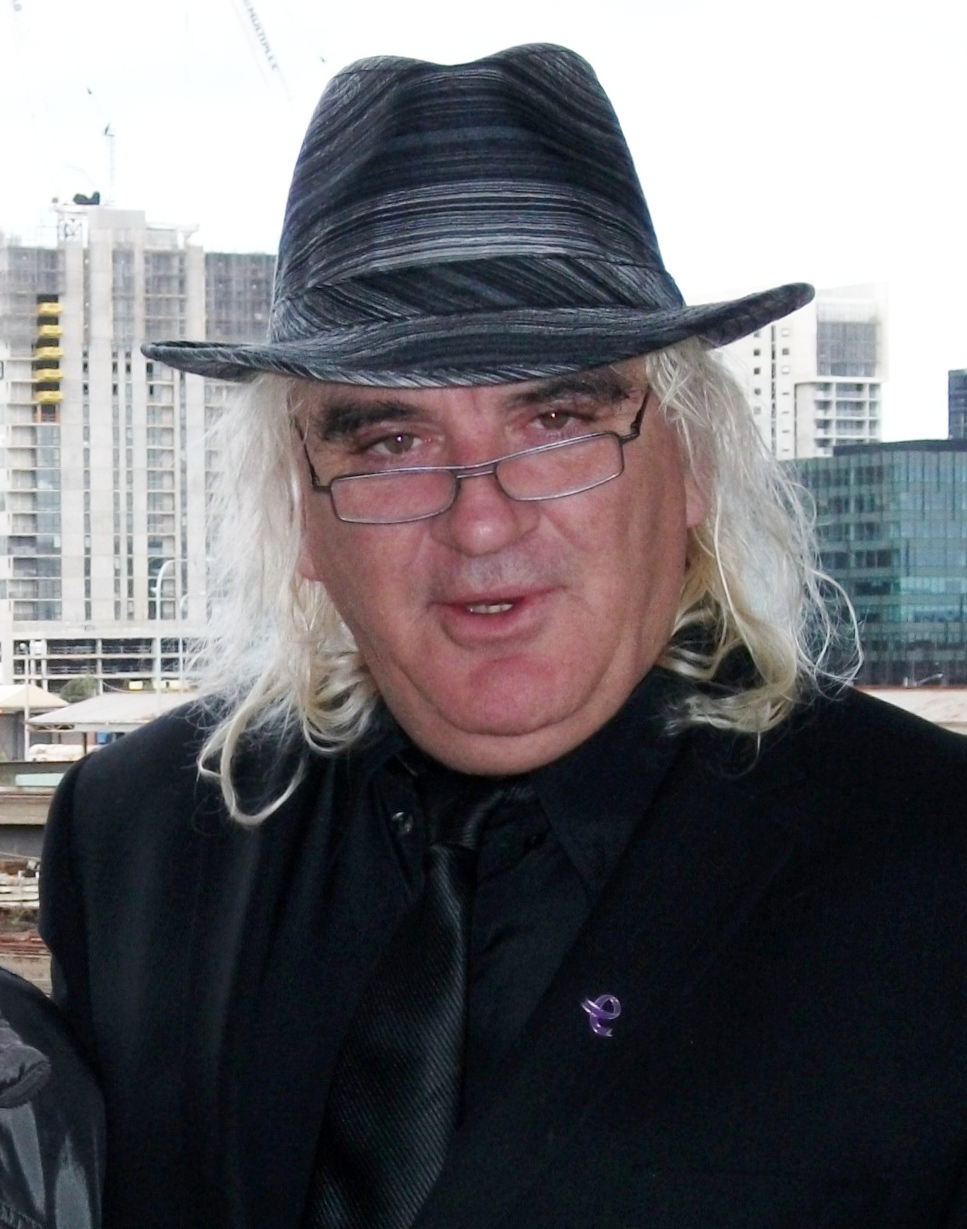
- Corfe in May 2011
- Born: 7 July 1960 (age 66); Preston, Victoria
- Occupation: Welfare worker

Jeffrey "Joffa" Corfe (born 7 July 1960) was the face of the Collingwood Football Club cheer squad from 2002 to 2018 and was famous for donning his gold jacket when it appeared the Magpies were going to win a match.

== Early life ==
Corfe, one of four boys and three girls, came from a working-class family in Melbourne. His mother, June Murphy, was an alcoholic and a drug addict. His father, Robert Corfe, who also was an alcoholic and a drug addict, drove a truck, delivered mail and had various other jobs. When he was a young child, Corfe's family moved around various suburbs in Melbourne, escaping debt and financial obligations. By the time he was 14, in the mid-1970s, Corfe had left home and was living at the Allambie Boys Home in East Burwood, where he stayed for about five years. During this time he recalls a "lovely couple" taking him to Victoria Park, where he saw his first game of football. His six siblings also lived in and out of public homes and foster care throughout their early years due to their parents' chronic instability and poverty.

In his early adolescence, Corfe drifted between different jobs and different homes; his living situation alternated between public housing, his unstable family, and the streets. He was homeless for four years in his late teenage years, until he got a job at a plastics factory in Hawthorn and was able to escape homelessness.

== Personal life and family ==
His daughter, Emma, was diagnosed in 2003 with epilepsy (at the age of 13), and he has since become a vocal advocate for the Epilepsy Foundation of Victoria. He likes to read books and spend time with his three grandchildren—Simon, Jeffrey, and Destiny-Pearl—who are indigenous. He has close connections with the indigenous community at Lake Tyers. He has not had a drink of alcohol since 2000, saying: "I never had a problem with it, but I have major problems with people who are intoxicated. They just don't make sense."

Corfe was employed as a welfare worker at the Anchorage Hostel, a Salvation Army refuge for homeless men, as recently as 2011. He worked as a nightshifter, working from 11 pm to 8:30 am.

== Gold jacket ==
Corfe rose to prominence in 2002 by donning a gold jacket and holding up a "Game Over" banner during games when he felt Collingwood had secured victory, usually in the fourth quarter. The jacket came from the Channel Nine wardrobe and had been previously worn by Bernard King and Tommy Hanlon Jr. When Corfe saw Eddie McGuire wear it on The Footy Show, he emailed McGuire to ask if he could use it to celebrate Collingwood victories. McGuire had the jacket dry-cleaned and handed it over at a Victoria Park training session.

Before the 2003 AFL Grand Final, Corfe announced that he was going to discontinue use of the jacket; however, after Collingwood's loss, he suggested that the jacket would make a comeback the next season. New jackets were introduced in 2005 and 2010. The last version featured the logo of the Epilepsy Foundation of Victoria on the front and back. In 2010, Corfe said that he would retire the gold jacket "if the Pies win the flag." He had the jacket on by the sixth minute of the final quarter of the 2010 AFL Grand Final replay as Collingwood stormed to a comfortable win over St Kilda.

== Charity work ==
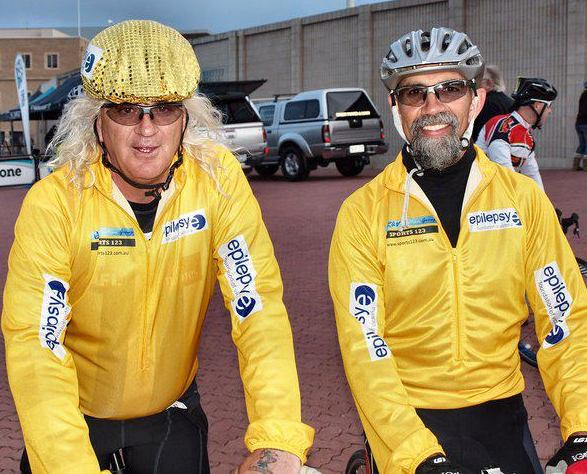
Corfe and Joffre Pearce at Football Park

Corfe was a notable fundraiser for the Epilepsy Foundation of Victoria for several years. Joffa’s Walk for Epilepsy was run in 2006. In conjunction with the release of Joffa: The Movie in 2010, Joffa bobblehead dolls were sold by the Epilepsy Foundation of Victoria to raise funds for epilepsy research.

His iconic gold jacket, retired after Collingwood's 2010 premiership win, was auctioned on eBay for $3,900 with all proceeds going to the Epilepsy Foundation of Victoria.

From 30 July 2011 to 6 August 2011, Corfe and Joffre Pearce, father of Danyle Pearce, at the time a player with the Port Adelaide Football Club, completed a fundraising bicycle ride from Rockbank, outside of Melbourne, to Football Park in Adelaide. Along the way they met up with local football clubs, and gave and received encouragement. Olympic Gold Medalist Brett Aitken joined the riders on their final leg. The ride raised over $1,300 for the Epilepsy Foundation of Victoria's Parent Epilepsy Support Network.

== Movie and biography ==
Inspired by the classic Australian movie The Club, producer-director Chris Liontos decided to make his own film about Australian rules football "through the eyes of the most passionate supporter in the country." Joffa: The Movie was released nationally in cinemas on 2 September 2010. The DVD of the movie was released in December 2010 by Madman Entertainment. The DVD includes a full set of commentaries, bloopers and footage of Collingwood's 2010 Grand Final win celebrations.

Corfe's biography (Joffa: Isn't That Life?) was launched by Father Bob Maguire on 11 June 2015. The book was reviewed by Rohan Connolly in The Age and Peter Rolfe in the Sunday Herald Sun.

== Controversies ==
When Prime Minister, Julia Gillard, tried to rally voters during the 2010 federal election by calling for a "unity ticket" of people who hated the Collingwood Football Club, Corfe reacted by saying that she had "lost his vote". When she was asked to explain her comments, Gillard said that she had no choice but to "stick with her footy principles". Joffa said, "For a Prime Minister to jump on the anti-Collingwood bandwagon, I reckon it’s a bit poor... We don’t need that stuff on the national political stage." He added: "I have gone to the Greens, she’s finished."

In 2008 Corfe created controversy when photographs of him posing with two rifles in the manner of Melbourne criminal Chopper Read were posted on a Collingwood supporters' internet forum. His actions were criticised by gun control activists but Collingwood's president, Eddie McGuire, defended Corfe's character.

After a ban on the use of the term "white maggot" in reference to umpires was introduced at the Gabba in 2007, Corfe defended the right of supporters to use the term. He compared security at the ground to the Gestapo.

Although Corfe has been the highest profile member of the Collingwood cheer squad, he has not always had a comfortable relationship with other fans and club staff. In 2003 leaflets criticising his behaviour and including his home address were distributed at a Collingwood match.

In Round 18 of the 2002 AFL season, in a match between Collingwood and their archrival Carlton, Corfe drew attention to the fact that Carlton were going to finish last that year by waving an oversized wooden spoon. The spoon was initially confiscated, though it was later put on display at the Collingwood club rooms. Collingwood won that game by 108 points.

After the final report of the aged care royal commission was handed to the federal government, Corfe tweeted: "Get rid of all Indian workers in aged care might be a start". This occurred at a time when Collingwood Football Club was investigating systemic racism through its "Do Better" report, and the club distanced itself from Corfe and his comment.

=== Historical sexual abuse ===
In May 2021, it was announced that Corfe had been charged with a child sex offence for an incident that occurred in 2005. Corfe was arrested in Abbotsford, Melbourne, on 6 May 2021 and charged with historical child sexual abuse pertaining to the sexual penetration of a 14-year-old minor, following an investigation launched in 2020 by the Fawkner Sexual Offences and Child Abuse Investigation Team. In a statement, Collingwood FC said, "Collingwood condemns without qualification inappropriate conduct of any kind but cannot, and will not, comment on matters before the courts."

In November 2022, Corfe pled guilty to the sexual penetration of a 14-year-old boy. The prosecution sought a term of imprisonment. On 27 February 2023, Corfe was sentenced to 12 months’ prison, wholly suspended for two years.

In December 2022, a second man, aged 39, alleged he was 15 when he began speaking to Corfe on a hotline for LGTBQ teenagers in late 1998. The victim, using the alias "Thomas", signed a statutory declaration to The Age alleging that Corfe, who was 39 at the time, invited him to a Collingwood–Hawthorn game. Thomas claims he and Corfe walked to Flinders Street Station, where an alleged sexual assault happened inside a toilet.

In March 2023, the Office of Public Prosecution announced that they would not be appealing the sentence.

In August 2024 after several months of a police investigation, due to insufficient evidence no charges were laid against Corfe. However, a successful application was made to the Victims Of Crime Tribunal, where a determination was made that offences were committed in 1998-99 and monetary compensation was paid to the second victim, Mark Behrens (who waived his right to privacy).
