= Peter Bowers (Australian journalist) =

Australian journalist (1930–2015)

Peter Bowers (1930 – 28 June 2010) was an Australian journalist, born in Taree, New South Wales. He was offered a cadetship by Frank Packer in 1948 and in 1959, joined The Sydney Morning Herald. He remained with the paper until 1987, working for periods as a political correspondent in the Canberra Press Gallery, as a news editor, as a national affairs columnist, and as a sports reporter. He was awarded a Gold Walkley Award in 1992 for Most Outstanding Contribution to Journalism in the Senior Journalism Section. Bowers died of Alzheimer's disease at a nursing home in Narrabundah in 2010.
