= Epilepsy Foundation of Victoria =

Australian charity

The Epilepsy Foundation is a large Australian charity, headquartered in Surrey Hills, Victoria, which provides evidence-based programs to support to people living with epilepsy, and all those who care for them. Epilepsy Foundation programs are delivered nationally through the Epilepsy Australia network of service delivery partners. The Epilepsy Foundation delivers services directly in New South Wales and Victoria. The Epilepsy Foundation aims to stop avoidable deaths, ensure children get a good education, help people get and keep their jobs and help people feel safe and connected. The Epilepsy Foundation works to ensure that "no one with epilepsy goes it alone".

== History ==
The foundation was formed in 1964 by a group of concerned parents to provide support and information to all Victorians affected by epilepsy. Initially called the Victorian Bureau for Epilepsy, one of the priorities was accommodation following the closure in 1963 of what was known as the Talbot Colony for Epileptics. The organisation's name changed to the Epilepsy Foundation of Victoria in 1978 and the next few years saw its continued rapid development including the appointment of a consultant medical officer and the establishment of a medical advisory panel. In 2016, the name was subsequently changed to the Epilepsy Foundation.

== Today ==
The charity develops policies regarding epilepsy in schools, engages in advocacy and provides funding for academic/clinical research. The organisation forms part of Epilepsy Australia, a coalition of national and local epilepsy charities across Australia.

In 2020, the Australian Government provided funding to the Epilepsy Foundation to develop a new program titled Epilepsy Smart Australia. The program aims to reduce the chronic health impacts experienced by Australians of all ages living with epilepsy. The Epilepsy Foundation is a registered National Disability Insurance Scheme (NDIS) Support provider.

The Epilepsy Foundation has established the Australian Epilepsy Research Register and conducted five waves of research into the impacts of epilepsy on people's lives. The Epilepsy Foundation has also established a peer-reviewed grants program the Australian Epilepsy Research Fund. With a seeding investment of $2 million from the Australian Government, the Australian Epilepsy Research Fund was developed with the hope of finding a cure through research. The first project to be awarded funding from the Australian Epilepsy Research Fund is the Florey SYNGAP-1 Gene Project.
