= Martyn Park =

Australian filmmaker

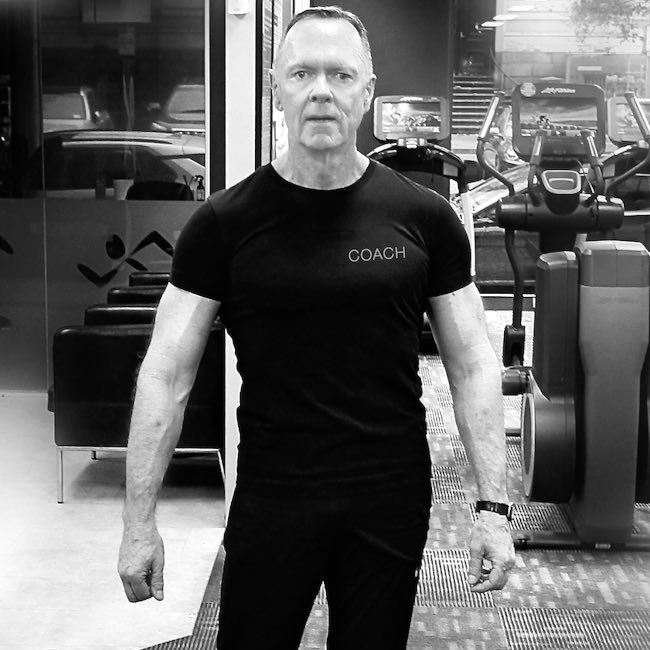
- Born: England
- Occupations: Writer, Director, Health & Training Coach
- Years active: 1957–present

Martyn Park is an Australian writer, director, and Health & Training Coach.

== Early life ==
Born in England, Park's family immigrated to Australia as Ten Pound Poms when he was six years old. After a short stint living in a Nissen hut at the Wacol Hostel in Wacol, Queensland, they moved to Cronulla Beach in New South Wales. He left school at fifteen and worked at the local Cronulla Cinema as an assistant projectionist. A year later he joined Hoyts Theatres in the city of Sydney, where he completed his apprenticeship. Working the suburban relief roster, he screened a double feature at a different cinema every night, ten different movies per week. He credits this with creating his passion for cinema.

== The gym years ==
When the work of projectionists became fully automated, Park changed careers by moving into the fitness industry. In 1975 he studied to be a Naturopath at the St Leonards College of Natural Therapies in Artarmon, NSW. After finishing his studies, between 1978 and 1982 he worked at City Gym, and the Squashlands Chain, as a fitness and aerobics instructor, and at the John Valentines Health Club, as a weight loss and diet consultant. In 1982 he worked as the manager and head trainer at the first Golds Gym in Australia located in Ashfield, NSW.

In 1985, he took over a dilapidated building in Beverly Hills and opened the Leisuredome Gymnasium (The Natural Physique Centre) where he specialized in natural bodybuilding and weight loss. Over his term of ownership, Park built the gymnasium into one of Australia's premier natural bodybuilding gyms where at its peak, he had created five national champions, one world champion, and numerous state and regional title holders.

In 2005 he sold the gym (which is still operating as a natural bodybuilding gym after 37 years in business) and moved into freelance coaching and teaching.

== Film career ==
Park's first feature film, Going Once Going Twice, premiered at the Open City Film Festival in 1997 alongside The Castle. His second feature, Instant Karma, premiered at the Melbourne Underground Film Festival in July 2001. He rewrote the screenplay of Instant Karma into a stage play and in September 2001 he screened the film alongside the world premiere of the play at the Bondi Pavilion Theatre. Unlike the film which was set in a modern contemporary setting, the play was staged as a black-and-white 1950s style cinema experience where the set and the actors (using makeup and costume) were completely devoid of colour.

Between 2001 and 2007, while waiting for digital film technology to improve, Park concentrated on writing screenplays and developing his filmmaking skills by working on other filmmakers' films. In 2008 Park created 1 and 0 nly, a science fiction film starring only one actor, Christopher Baker (who won best actor at the 2009 Fantastic Planet Film Festival for his portrayal of Lieutenant Frank James Morley). 1 and 0 nly premiered at the Lausanne Underground Film Festival in Lausanne, Switzerland where it was awarded "Mention spéciale à”. It later went on to win Best Narrative Film at the 2009 Scinema Festival of Science Film.

In 2010 he teamed up with his brother Ray Park and they made the feature film 1MC:Something of Vengeance. The film was shot entirely in a condemned two-storey building just around the corner from where they grew up in Cronulla.

In 2012 he made his fourth feature as a Lonedog Production, iSOLATE. It premiered at the Los Angeles Fear and Fantasy Film Festival (where lead actress Jacinta John won the best actress award for her portrayal of Scout Taylor) and later screened on the opening night of the 2012 CinefestOz film festival alongside The Intouchables, and 33 Postcards.

In 2014 he made his seventh feature film Under The Bridge, an intimate film about family and the oft time struggles between siblings.

In 2018 he made his eight feature film 1 + 1 = 11, his second film in the avant-garde science fiction genre.

In 2019 he made his ninth feature film Spencer (2019 film)|Spencer, which was opening night film at the Pride Queer Film Festival in Perth, where it won the audience award for best picture.

He has been described as being "possibly the most independent filmmaker in the world".

== A Lonedog Production ==
In a similar production style as Shane Carruth (Primer) or an early career Robert Rodriguez (El Mariachi), when working as A Lonedog Production, Park takes on all the crewing roles, working entirely on his own. This solo method of filmmaking also continues through the post-production process.

== Filmography ==
- (2019) – Spencer (feature film)
- (2018) – 1 + 1 = 11 (feature film)
- (2014) – Under The Bridge (feature film)
- (2013) – Mask (short)
- (2012) – iSOLATE (feature film)
- (2012) – Maiden (short)
- (2010) – 1MC:Something of Vengeance (feature film)
- (2008) – 1 and 0 nly (feature film)
- (2001) – Instant Karma (feature film)
- (2000) – Kelly's Thesis (feature film)
- (1997) – Going Once Going Twice (feature film)
