= List of 2010 box office number-one films in Australia =

This is a list of films which have placed number one at the weekend box office in Australia during 2010. All amounts are in Australian dollars.

== Number-one films ==
†	This implies the highest-grossing movie of the year.

#	Week end date	Film	Total weekend gross	Openings
1	3 January 2010	Avatar	$9,659,700	The Princess and the Frog (#7), Fantastic Mr. Fox (#8).
2	10 January 2010	Avatar	$8,338,365	It's Complicated (#2).
3	17 January 2010	Avatar	$7,002,454	Tooth Fairy (#2), Up in the Air (#5), Bran Nue Dae (#6), Chance Pe Dance (#20).
4	24 January 2010	Avatar	$5,604,268	Invictus (#3), Nine (#9), Toy Story 1 and 2 in 3D (#11), In the Loop (#15), Veer (#20).
5	31 January 2010	Avatar	$4,548,004	Law Abiding Citizen (#2), The Road (#10).
6	7 February 2010	Avatar	$3,936,622	Edge of Darkness (#2), Daybreakers (#3), Precious (#13).
7	14 February 2010	Valentine's Day	$7,516,439	The Wolfman (#3), Percy Jackson & the Olympians: The Lightning Thief (#4), My Name Is Khan (#10), A Prophet (#20).
8	21 February 2010	Valentine's Day	$2,781,309	Shutter Island (#2), From Paris with Love (#6), The Hurt Locker (#8), Crazy Heart (#12), Celine: Through the Eyes of the World (#18).
9	28 February 2010	The Blind Side	$2,568,536	A Single Man (#9).
10	7 March 2010	Alice in Wonderland	$10,377,137	Dear John (#3), The Men Who Stare at Goats (#8).
11	14 March 2010	Alice in Wonderland	$6,463,865	Green Zone (#2), Remember Me (#8), My One and Only (#18).
12	21 March 2010	Alice in Wonderland	$4,947,467	The Bounty Hunter (#2), Cop Out (#5), The Rebound (#9), Brothers (#15).
13	28 March 2010	How to Train Your Dragon	$2,651,893	The Girl with the Dragon Tattoo (#6), Nanny McPhee and the Big Bang (#7), The Spy Next Door (#15), The Last Station (#20).
14	4 April 2010	Clash of the Titans	$10,071,350	The Last Song (#4), She's Out of My League (#6), Micmacs (#15), Welcome (#19).
15	11 April 2010	How to Train Your Dragon	$3,547,843	Date Night (#3), Kick-Ass (#5).
16	18 April 2010	How to Train Your Dragon	$2,095,092	The Book of Eli (#4), Beneath Hill 60 (#9), Coco Chanel & Igor Stravinsky (#16).
17	25 April 2010	Hot Tub Time Machine	$1,274,773	When in Rome (#6).
18	2 May 2010	Iron Man 2	$9,507,179	Housefull (#13), The Concert (#15).
19	9 May 2010	Iron Man 2	$4,565,882	I Love You Too (#2), Letters to Juliet (#7), Soul Kitchen (#17), The White Ribbon (#19).
20	16 May 2010	Robin Hood	$5,616,490	New York, I Love You (#14).
21	23 May 2010	Robin Hood	$3,606,899	Wog Boy 2: The Kings of Mykonos (#2), The Back-Up Plan (#4), A Nightmare on Elm Street (#5), Harry Brown (#7), Kites (#9), Food, Inc. (#18).
22	30 May 2010	Prince of Persia: The Sands of Time	$3,487,968	Street Dance 3D (#6), The Losers (#9), The Secret in Their Eyes (#12), Animal Kingdom (#13).
23	6 June 2010	Sex and the City 2	$7,793,801	Legion (#9), Raajneeti (#12), Exit Through the Gift Shop (#1).
24	13 June 2010	Sex and the City 2	$3,959,290	The A-Team (#2), Get Him to the Greek (#7).
25	20 June 2010	Shrek Forever After	$4,890,789	Mother and Child (#8), Raavan (#9).
26	27 June 2010	Toy Story 3 †	$7,408,201	Grown Ups (#3), Marmaduke (#7), I Am Love (#11).
27	4 July 2010	The Twilight Saga: Eclipse	$12,990,707	The Karate Kid (#5), Farewell (#13), I Hate Luv Storys (#15).
28	11 July 2010	Toy Story 3 †	$6,361,024	Predators (#5), The Hedgehog (#14), The Big Four (#18).
29	18 July 2010	Knight and Day	$3,753,462	The Waiting City (#11), The Runaways (#12), Creation (#14), Mel Karade Rabba (#15).
30	25 July 2010	Inception	$7,428,415	Greenberg (#17), Khatta Meetha (#19).
31	1 August 2010	Inception	$7,939,374	Killers (#2), South Solitary (#10), Centurion (#11), Me and Orson Welles (#12).
32	8 August 2010	Inception	$4,163,040	Step Up 3D (#2), The Special Relationship (#8), The Ghost Writer (#11).
33	15 August 2010	Inception	$3,157,091	The Expendables (#2), Scott Pilgrim vs. the World (#4), Hubble 3D (#14), Splice (#15), Peepli Live (#17).
34	22 August 2010	Salt	$3,940,438	Matching Jack (#7), Cairo Time (#12), Four Lions (#13).
35	29 August 2010	Salt	$2,515,352	Vampires Suck (#3), Piranha 3D (#5), Boy (#8), The Killer Inside Me (#13).
36	5 September 2010	Tomorrow, When the War Began	$3,862,193	Going the Distance (#4), The Kids Are All Right (#10), We Are Family (#17), Reel Anime 2010 (#20)^{[A]}.
37	12 September 2010	Despicable Me	$3,232,788	The Other Guys (#2), The Sorcerer's Apprentice (#4), Dabangg (#13), The Disappearance of Alice Creed (#15).
38	19 September 2010	Despicable Me	$4,129,606	The Last Airbender (#2), Easy A (#5), Cats & Dogs: The Revenge of Kitty Galore (#6), The Reluctant Infidel (#20).
39	26 September 2010	Despicable Me	$2,214,092	Wall Street: Money Never Sleeps (#3), Diary of a Wimpy Kid (#5), Charlie St. Cloud (#9), The Girl Who Played with Fire (#11).
40	3 October 2010	Despicable Me	$2,731,356	Legend of the Guardians: The Owls of Ga'Hoole (#2), Dinner for Schmucks (#7), Anjaana Anjaani (#15), The Tree (#19).
41	10 October 2010	Eat Pray Love	$3,473,338	Buried (#6).
42	17 October 2010	Eat Pray Love	$2,167,897	The Town (#2), Resident Evil: Afterlife (#3), Let Me In (#5), Chloe (#18).
43	24 October 2010	Paranormal Activity 2	$2,665,028	Life as We Know It (#2), Summer Coda (#19).
44	31 October 2010	The Social Network	$2,687,927	Red (#2), Saw 3D (#5), Made in Dagenham (#9).
45	7 November 2010	Jackass 3D	$3,582,884	Golmaal 3 (#10), The Loved Ones (#12), Action Replayy (#16), Gainsbourg (#17).
46	14 November 2010	Jackass 3D	$1,917,056	Skyline (#3), Wild Target (#6), The American (#7), Machete (#13), Winter's Bone (#14).
47	21 November 2010	Harry Potter and the Deathly Hallows – Part 1	$15,293,557	Guzaarish (#15), Agora (#17).
48	28 November 2010	Harry Potter and the Deathly Hallows – Part 1	$8,786,301	Due Date (#2), Fair Game (#3), The Last Exorcism (#6), Red Hill (#11), Monsters (#13), Break Ke Baad (#18).
49	5 December 2010	Harry Potter and the Deathly Hallows – Part 1	$4,550,250	The Chronicles of Narnia: The Voyage of the Dawn Treader (#2), Devil (#5).
50	12 December 2010	Megamind	$2,468,882	No Problem (#11).
51	19 December 2010	Tron: Legacy	$3,319,143	Love & Other Drugs (#3), Somewhere (#12).
52	26 December 2010	Meet the Parents: Little Fockers	$6,753,661	Gulliver's Travels (#2), The Tourist (#3), The King's Speech (#4), Blue Valentine (#11), Sarah's Key (#12), Heartbreaker (#14), Tees Maar Khan (#19).

== Notes ==
- A A biennial event showcasing anime films for two weeks, held by Madman Entertainment in cinemas in capital cities across the country. The films are screened in their native Japanese with English subtitles. In 2010, the films were: Evangelion: 2.0 You Can (Not) Advance (with additional limited screenings of Evangelion: 1.0 You Are (Not) Alone), King of Thorn, Redline, and Summer Wars.

== See also ==
- List of Australian films – Australian films by year
