= 2010 Australian federal budget =

Australian federal budget

Australian federal budget 2010–11
- Submitted: 11 May 2010
- Submitted to: Parliament of Australia
- Country: Australia
- Parliament: 42nd
- Party: Australian Labor Party
- Treasurer: Wayne Swan
- Total revenue: A$309.9 billion
- Total expenditures: A$356.1 billion
- Debt payment: $9,273 million
- Deficit: A$47.7 billion
- Debt: A$$84.6 billion
- Website: 2010–11 Commonwealth Budget

The 2010 Australian federal budget for the Australian financial year ended 30 June 2011 was presented on 11 May 2010 by the Treasurer of Australia, Wayne Swan, the third federal budget presented by Swan, and the third and final budget of the first Rudd government.

The budget forecast a return to surplus in 2012–13. Projections were based on a successful passing of the Resource Super Profits Tax based on a 40% of mining company profits.

The budget featured changes to regulation regarding savings from 1 July 2011. Tax will only have to be paid on half of the total interest earned so as to encourage people to save. There were changes to the way millions of Australians do their tax returns by decreasing their reliance on tax agents. Sport in Australia received a "significant" funding boost. The budget was the first ever to be released under a Creative Commons license.

== Forecasts ==
=== Deficit ===
The deficit for the 2010–2011 financial year was expected to be A$40.8 billion or 2.9% of gross domestic product.

== Revenue mix ==
The total revenue was $309.9 billion.

=== Taxation ===
The Resource Super Profits tax (RSPT) was expected to generate $3 billion in revenue in 2011–12. However Julia Gillard replaced the RSPT with the Minerals Resource Rent Tax (MRRT). The new tax was expected to generate $10.5 billion in revenue during its first two years of operation beginning in 2012. By increasing the taxation on mining super profits the company taxation rate can be dropped to 29% in 2013–14 and 28% in 2014–15.

Those able to save will receive a 50% tax discount on the first $1,000 of interest earned on their deposits.

== Expenditure mix ==
The forecast total expenditure is $356.1 billion.

=== General government ===
More than $1 billion is planned to be spent on securing Australian borders. $120 million will be spent on improving the Christmas Island Immigration Reception and Processing Centre. Airport security is receiving $759 million over four years and to combat illegal fishing $163 million will be spent over the same period.

After recommendation which were made in the Ahead of the Game report the budget allocated funds for improving service delivery. More than $1 billion is to be spent on public-sector technology projects, particularly on applications development and simplification of interacting with clients using the internet. Australian Transaction Reports and Analysis Centre is to receive extra funding so it can target of serious and organised crime, tax evasion and fraud.

=== Social security and welfare ===
Compulsory superannuation rates increased from 9% to 12%.

=== Infrastructure, transport and energy ===
$652 million was allocated to the Renewable Energy Future Fund which will develop solar, wind, geothermal and clean coal technologies. According to the Clean Energy Council the purpose of the fund is to "leverage private venture capital by encouraging partnerships between the Government and the private sector in the commercialisation of new renewable technologies and to encourage energy efficiency measures".

As part of the national road-building program New South Wales received the largest share at $717 million, then Queensland with $539 million and $260 million in Victoria.

=== Education ===
Funding for an extra 70,000 vocational education places has been provided for in the budget.

=== Defence ===
Defence spending was boosted $4.3 billion. $9.7 million was to be spent on combating domestic terrorist threats. Money was allocated for the establishment of the Counter Terrorism Control Centre and on an improved and more secure passport issuing system.

=== Health ===
$2.2 billion in new funding was allocated to the National Health and Hospitals Network after agreement was reached with the states. $355 million was to be provided for the establishment of GP Super Clinics. An increase of 25% on the tax for cigarettes is expected to raise $5 billion over five years to help fund primary health care expenses. Payments will be made eligible so that every doctor's practice in the country may employ a nurse. These rebates were previously only available in rural area and were capped at $40,000.

Aged care received a boost of $132 million. Some of the money will be spent on investigating a national licensing and regulation system for personal care workers and $90 million was allocated to upgrading the qualifications of aged care nurses and personal care workers.

$467 million has been set aside for the provision of electronic health records to those who want it. Changes to the Pharmaceutical Benefits Scheme will see $2.5 billion being saved over five years from the beginning of the 2010–11 financial year.

=== Community services and culture ===
Elite sports in Australia were allocated $237 million over four years and $71 million was planned to support community sports.

== Opposition and crossbench response ==
Opposition Leader Tony Abbott focused his attack on the mining industry tax, indicating he would rescind the tax if elected. Shadow Treasurer Joe Hockey claimed the budget was "based on false assumptions". Hockey suggested the budget was too reliant on a "great big new tax" and lacked any serious reform.

== Reception ==
The election year budget was described as an exercise in restraint that contained few surprises. The budget was faulted because it relies on strong terms of trade, demand from Asia, in particular China and a global recovery. It was praised by health and financial services sectors. The Australian Medical Association welcomed the extra funding for health. Catholic Health Australia reacted positively to the measures aimed at training and retaining medical and aged care staff.

The Business Council of Australia was disappointed the MRRT would be used to return to surplus.

== See also ==
- Australian national debt
- Henry Tax Review
