= Isolate (film) =

- Australian release poster
- Directed by: Martyn Park
- Written by: Martyn Park
- Produced by: Jacinta John
- Starring: Jacinta John; Terry Serio; Stephen Anderton; Ray Park
- Cinematography: Martyn Park
- Edited by: Martyn Park
- Music by: Martyn Park
- Production company: Interlude Pictures
- Distributed by: Titan View Australia/NZ
- Release dates: May 2012 (Los Angeles Fear and Fantasy); 22 August 2013 (Australia)
- Running time: 76 minutes
- Country: Australia
- Language: English

Isolate, styled as iSOLATE, is a 2012 Australian horror film written and directed by indie filmmaker Martyn Park, starring Jacinta John and Terry Serio. The film premiered at the inaugural Los Angeles Fear and Fantasy Film Festival in 2012, where its lead actress Jacinta John won the best actress award for her portrayal of Scout Taylor.|

== Synopsis ==
Isolate is the story of Scout Taylor, a young woman who returns to the family's remote cattle station after the sudden death of her mother. As an only child and with Brian her father suffering from a progressive and debilitating illness, she commits to leaving behind her coffee shop in the city and staying on at the farm to look after him and the property. On the day of her mother's funeral, when all the mourners have left and she and her father are alone, Brian confesses he and her mother had made a pact. He tells Scout that her mother had promised to assist him in taking his own life before his illness would render his body useless, and eventually, painfully steal his last breath. But now, with her mother's tragic death making that impossible, he turns to Scout to help him with his desire to commit suicide. Enraged by his admission, on this day of all days, Scout reveals that her mother had already tearfully confided the details of his plan some months earlier, a plan that she wasn't as complicit with as he would have liked to believe. Rather than assist his suicide, Scout vows to help her father continue running the property while nursing him to a peaceful and natural death.

One morning after feeding the horses, Scout returns home to cook her father breakfast only to discover he has disappeared. At first she is not overly concerned, but as the day wears on she begins to fear that in his now fragile state he may have had an accident, or worse. Alone and cut off from all communication, she sets about doing whatever she can to find him. As night falls, the darkness intensifies her fears, and after exhausting all possible solutions in finding him, she retreats back to the isolation of the house. It is back at the house, alone with her thoughts and conscience, that the reality and horror of this film unfolds, revealing a dramatic and twisting climax.

== Cast ==
- Jacinta John as Scout
- Terry Serio as Dad
- Stephen Anderton as Richard
- Ray Park as Mason

== Production ==
Originally set in the Australian desert (the Red Center), the film had to be re-written to reduce the cost of filming so far out from their base in central Sydney. After scouring the Australian countryside, a 400-acre property situated sixty kilometers from Lithgow, New South Wales, was eventually found. It served as both the on screen Taylor residence, with all the requirements of a small cattle station, as well as the accommodation and production space to house the director and the cast for two weeks, where, with the exception of one scene, the film was entirely shot.

Isolate is the third feature by filmmaker Martyn Park where he has worked entirely on his own, both during production and then later in post-production. It is also the first feature where he composed the score.

== Release ==
Isolate premiered in the United States on 18 May 2012 at the Los Angeles Fear and Fantasy Film Festival. It was released in Australia on 22 August 2013.

== Awards ==
Jacinta John, both the film's producer and lead actress won best actress awards at the 2012 Los Angeles Fear and Fantasy Film Festival, and the Indie Gems Film Festival.
