= Murder of Iris Temperley =

2010 murder in Rockhampton, Australia

Iris Temperley
- Born: 2 March 1927; Springsure, Queensland, Australia
- Died: 3 February 2010 (aged 82); Brisbane, Queensland, Australia
- Cause of death: Homicide (bashing)
- Spouse: Gordon Temperley (1949-2004; his death)
- Children: 5

Iris Daphne Temperley (née Donovan; 2 March 1927 – 3 February 2010) was an Australian woman who was murdered in Rockhampton, Queensland, Australia.

18-year-old David Samuel Aubrey Ray randomly attacked and raped 82-year-old Temperley in the backyard of her home in George Street in the suburb of Rockhampton City on the morning of 26 January 2010. He inflicted extensive injuries to Temperley in the particularly violent attack, which caused considerable anger within the Rockhampton community.

Temperley died from her injuries at the Royal Brisbane and Women's Hospital on 3 February 2010 without having regained consciousness.

== Background ==
Temperley was born Iris Daphne Donovan at Springsure, Queensland on 2 March 1927. She married Gordon Temperley on 1 December 1949 at St Paul's Cathedral in Rockhampton, and together they had five children.

After spending some time managing a cattle property north of Duaringa, the Temperley's moved to Rockhampton in 1959 and purchased a house in George Street where the family settled.

At the time of her death, Temperley had 11 grandchildren and nine great-grandchildren.

== Murder ==
Temperley was raking leaves in the backyard of her George Street home when she was set upon by Ray who used a fire extinguisher in the attack, causing Temperley to sustain extensive injuries including skull swelling, broken nose, fractured ribs, fractured sternum, collapsed lung, and tearing to her genitals, causing profuse bleeding.

Ray attacked Temperley after having stolen alcohol from the Leichhardt Hotel in Bolsover Street, and before committing a burglary at a neighbouring house.

Temperley was admitted to the intensive care unit at Rockhampton Hospital in a critical condition before being flown to Brisbane, where she died from her injuries on 3 February 2010.

After Temperley's death, a public memorial was held at St Paul's Cathedral, which was attended by more than 100 people.

Member for Rockhampton Robert Schwarten said that Temperley's death had affected the Rockhampton community, stating: "Disbelief, revulsion, anger and fear has riled through this community."

== Arrest ==
On 27 January 2010, Ray attended the Rockhampton Police Station with a relative where he admitted to assaulting an elderly lady but claimed to be having difficulty remembering specific details.

He was arrested and ultimately charged with murder and rape as well as stealing and property offences.

After a mention in the Rockhampton Magistrates Court in September 2010, a committal hearing was scheduled for November 2010. Following the three-day committal hearing, magistrate Annette Hennessy ordered Ray to stand trial for the rape and murder of Iris Temperley.

== Trial ==
Ray's trial in the Rockhampton Supreme Court was held in September 2011 where he pleaded guilty to one count of murder and two counts of rape for which he received life sentences. An additional 15 years was added to his prison term for the burglary at Temperley's home as well as numerous other offences.

A psychiatrist's report was tendered to the court but Justice Duncan McMeekin said despite the report indicating that Ray had felt genuine remorse while also detailing his long-standing substance abuse problem, there was no psychiatric excuse for what Ray had done.

McMeekin described the facts of the case as "appalling" given that Temperley was "a frail elderly lady of 82 years" and told Ray: "You murdered her by causing injuries which caused her death some days later... The doctors were unable to stop the bleeding. Fortunately, she did not regain consciousness after your attack."

=== Appeal ===
Ray argued that some of the sentences were manifestly excessive and successfully appealed to have his sentence reduced. In a judgement, the Queensland Court of Appeal reduced Ray's sentence for Temperley's rape to 14 years and his sentence for burglary to three years.

Despite this, the sentences were still to be served concurrently with his life sentence for Temperley's murder.

== Legacy ==
In 2020, Temperley's name was added to an online memorial called The Red Heart Campaign, designed by journalist Sherele Moody to honour women and children who had died as a result of acts of violence.

As of April 2023, Ray was still incarcerated at the Capricornia Correctional Centre.

Temperley's nephew, Vern Donovan, who served as Fitzroy Shire Council's chief executive officer from 1965 to 2000, briefly wrote about Temperley's death in his autobiography You're Sincerely: My life's experiences and lessons learned, thus far.

Donovan said his elderly mother Merle Donovan was close to her sister-in-law and would speak regularly to Temperley on the phone. He said that Temperley's "sudden and cruel murder" had caused his mother who was residing in a Yeppoon retirement village to go into a "severe state of shock", and arrangements had to be made to have her transferred into a more calming area of the facility.
