= Col Saddington =

Australian rules footballer

Personal information
- Full name: Colin Keith Saddington
- Born: 26 June 1937
- Died: 18 April 2012 (aged 74)
- Original team: Richmond City Jrs
- Height: 180 cm (5 ft 11 in)
- Weight: 89 kg (196 lb)
- Positions: Ruckman, back pocket

Playing career^{1}
Years	Club	Games (Goals)
1956–1962	Richmond	102 (10)
- ^{1} Playing statistics correct to the end of 1962.

Colin Keith Saddington (26 June 1937 – 18 April 2012) was an Australian rules footballer who played with Richmond in the Victorian Football League (VFL).

Saddington was a ruckman and occasional defender, recruited locally. He polled the equal most votes by a Richmond player in the 1959 Brownlow Medal.

From 1963 to 1965, Saddington played 26 games for Sturt in the South Australian National Football League.

He spent the rest of the decade as playing coach of Western Border Football League club Coleraine, guiding them to a premiership in 1967.

Saddington then returned to Richmond and was put in charge of their Under-19s side. He was later coach of the Richmond reserves team. Saddington coached the reserves side to a premiership in 1973; that same year he was awarded a life membership. He retired from coaching after the 1975 season.
