= List of 2012 box office number-one films in Australia =

This is a list of films which have placed number one at the box office in Australia during 2012. All amounts are in Australian dollars.

== Number-one films ==
†	This implies the highest-grossing movie of the year.

#	Week ending	Film	Total week gross	Openings
1	4 January 2012	Alvin and the Chipmunks: Chipwrecked	$5,143,013	The Adventures of Tintin: The Secret of the Unicorn (#2), Tower Heist (#4), Happy Feet Two (#5), War Horse (#6), We Bought a Zoo (#7), The Iron Lady (#8), Albert Nobbs (#14), The Skin I Live In (#18)
2	11 January 2012	Sherlock Holmes: A Game of Shadows	$9,047,260	Met Opera: Rodelinda (#19), Players (#20)
3	18 January 2012	Sherlock Holmes: A Game of Shadows	$4,703,107	The Muppets (#2), The Descendants (#4), The Girl with the Dragon Tattoo (#5), Hugo (#6), Arrietty (#16), Nanban (#18)
4	25 January 2012	The Descendants	$3,549,853	Journey 2: The Mysterious Island (#2), Tinker Tailor Soldier Spy (#7), The Darkest Hour (#9), Young Adult (#17), Met Opera: Faust (#20)
5	1 February 2012	Underworld: Awakening	$3,478,099	A Few Best Men (#3), J. Edgar (#11), Agneepath (#16)
6	8 February 2012	Chronicle	$3,715,979	Man on a Ledge (#10), The Artist (#13), Martha Marcy May Marlene (#18)
7	15 February 2012	The Vow	$4,217,717	Safe House (#2), Star Wars Episode I: The Phantom Menace 3D (#4), This Means War (#6), Any Questions for Ben? (#7), Shame (#18)
8	22 February 2012	The Vow	$2,608,884	The Grey (#3), My Week with Marilyn (#7), One for the Money (#9)
9	29 February 2012	Contraband	$2,162,312	Extremely Loud and Incredibly Close (#8), Gone (#13), Killer Elite (#14)
10	7 March 2012	Project X	$1,822,489	The Devil Inside (#5), A Separation (#15), Carnage (#18)
11	14 March 2012	John Carter	$4,136,130	Headhunters (#11), The Best Exotic Marigold Hotel pre-release (#20)
12	21 March 2012	21 Jump Street	$5,445,294	Ghost Rider: Spirit of Vengeance (#3), Margin Call (#5), The Rum Diary (#7)
13	28 March 2012	The Hunger Games	$11,344,354	The Best Exotic Marigold Hotel (#2), The Raid: Redemption (#10), Agent Vinod (#11)
14	4 April 2012	The Hunger Games	$6,762,379	Dr. Seuss' The Lorax (#3), Wrath of the Titans (#4), Mirror Mirror (#6), A Dangerous Method (#7), Salmon Fishing in the Yemen pre-release (#10), Stephen Sondheim's Company (#11), Le Havre (#13), Fetih 1453 (#19)
15	11 April 2012	American Pie: Reunion	$7,591,951	Titanic 3D (#5), The Pirates! Band of Misfits 3D (#6), Salmon Fishing in the Yemen (#10), Housefull 2 (#11), Mirza – The Untold Story (#14), This Must Be the Place (#15), Love in the Buff (#18)
16	18 April 2012	Battleship	$5,397,004	The Deep Blue Sea (#16), National Theatre Live: She Stoops to Conquer (#18)
17	25 April 2012	The Avengers †	$6,003,882	The Lucky One (#2), StreetDance 2 (#13), Romantics Anonymous (#15), The Lady (#16)
18	2 May 2012	The Avengers †	$16,755,666	Wish You Were Here (#8), The Way (#14), Café de Flore (#17), Met Opera: Manon (#19)
19	9 May 2012	The Avengers †	$10,883,169	The Five-Year Engagement (#2), Act of Valour (#5), Beauty and the Beast 3D (#11), Delicacy (#15), Matthew Bourne's Swan Lake (#19)
20	16 May 2012	The Avengers †	$6,539,963	Dark Shadows (#2), The Dictator pre-release (#4), Safe (#6), Iron Sky (#13), Met Opera: La Traviata (#17), Trishna (#19)
21	23 May 2012	The Dictator	$6,415,545	The Woman in Black (#5)
22	30 May 2012	Men in Black 3	$6,444,052	Bel Ami (#6), This American Life – Live! (#15)
23	6 June 2012	Men in Black 3	$4,528,685	What to Expect When You're Expecting (#2), Get the Gringo (#6), Rowdy Rathore (#12), Declaration of War (#16)
24	13 June 2012	Prometheus	$9,481,245	Friends with Kids (#6), Le Chef pre-release (#13), National Theatre Live – Frankenstein V1 (#17), The Duel (#18), Shanghai (#19)
25	20 June 2012	Prometheus	$4,000,806	That's My Boy (#2), Rock of Ages (#3), Take This Waltz (#9), Le Chef (#11), The Cabin in the Woods (#13), Ferrari Ki Sawaari (#17), Margaret (#20)
26	27 June 2012	Snow White and the Huntsman	$8,553,638	Brave (#2), A Royal Affair (#9), The Three Stooges pre-release (#10), Elena (#14), Teri Meri Kahaani (#15), National Theatre Live – Frankenstein V2 (#20)
27	4 July 2012	Ice Age 4: Continental Drift	$9,408,924	Ted pre-release (#3), The Amazing Spider-Man preview (#5), Katy Perry: Part of Me pre-release (#9), André Rieu: 2012 Maastricht Concert (#12), Jatt & Juliet (#13), Painted Skin: The Resurrection (#17), Where Do We Go Now? (#18)
28	11 July 2012	Ted	$12,822,447	The Amazing Spider-Man (#3), Katy Perry: Part of Me (#6), Bol Bachchan (#10)
29	18 July 2012	Ted	$8,608,015	Hysteria (#8), Cocktail (#9), Not Suitable for Children (#11), Billa 2 (#17)
30	25 July 2012	The Dark Knight Rises	$19,219,489	The Door (#12), Bolshoi Ballet: Raymonda (#20)
31	1 August 2012	The Dark Knight Rises	$9,434,565	Magic Mike (#2), Carry On Jatta (#8), ...And If We All Lived Together? (#14), Kyaa Super Kool Hain Hum (#16), Star Trek: The Next Generation 25th Anniversary Event (#17)^{[A]}, In Darkness (#20)
32	8 August 2012	The Dark Knight Rises	$5,430,941	Step Up 4: Miami Heat (#3), Abraham Lincoln: Vampire Hunter (#4), Cosmopolis (#11), Jo Nesbø's Jackpot (#16)
33	15 August 2012	The Dark Knight Rises	$3,525,515	The Sapphires (#2), The Campaign (#3), Sirphire (#14), Storm Surfers 3D (#18)
34	22 August 2012	The Bourne Legacy	$5,445,934	Ek Tha Tiger (#7), Bernie (#11), Vulgaria (#17)
35	29 August 2012	Total Recall	$3,054,965	Hope Springs (#4), Lan Kwai Fong 2 (#15), Bully (#17), Barrymore (#18), Holy Motors (#20)
36	5 September 2012	The Expendables 2	$3,913,595	Moonrise Kingdom (#7), Finding Nemo 3D (#8), Joker (#16), Chinese Take-Away (#20)
37	12 September 2012	Kath & Kimderella	$2,605,716	Hit and Run (#9), Monsieur Lazhar (#11), Your Sister's Sister (#13), Raaz 3D (#16), Ajj De Ranjhe (#20)
38	19 September 2012	Madagascar 3: Europe's Most Wanted	$4,853,258	The Watch (#2), Resident Evil: Retribution (#3), Barfi! (#13), Beasts of the Southern Wild (#14), Reel Anime 2012 (#17)^{[B]}
39	26 September 2012	Madagascar 3: Europe's Most Wanted	$6,010,501	Hotel Transylvania (#2), Diary of a Wimpy Kid: Dog Days (#3), Ruby Sparks (#7), Bait (#10)
40	3 October 2012	Madagascar 3: Europe's Most Wanted	$6,963,810	Looper (#2), Arbitrage (#6), OMG: Oh My God! (#17), On the Road (#18)
41	10 October 2012	Taken 2	$9,553,534	Mental (#6), English Vinglish (#15), National Theatre Live: The Curious Incident of the Dog in the Night-Time (#19)
42	17 October 2012	Taken 2	$4,286,449	Lawless (#3), Killing Them Softly (#7), The Words (#10)
43	24 October 2012	Paranormal Activity 4	$4,325,073	Savages (#3), To Rome with Love (#6), Paul Kelly: Stories of Me (#14), Student of the Year (#16), The Thieves (#17), Safety Not Guaranteed (#18)
44	31 October 2012	Argo	$2,728,725	Dredd (#4), The Intouchables (#5), Frankenweenie (#7), National Theatre Live: The Last of the Haussmans (#17)
45	7 November 2012	Argo	$2,518,846	Bachelorette (#2), End of Watch (#3), Housos vs. Authority (#7), Met Opera: L'elisir d'amore (#18)
46	14 November 2012	Argo	$1,971,206	Seven Psychopaths (#2), Alex Cross (#7), The Sessions (#10), The Master (#14), Jesus Christ Superstar (#18)
47	21 November 2012	The Twilight Saga: Breaking Dawn – Part 2	$15,785,075	Nitro Circus: The Movie (#5), Jab Tak Hai Jaan (#7), Son of Sardaar (#15)
48	28 November 2012	Skyfall	$16,786,979	2 Days in New York (#15), National Theatre Live: Timon of Athens (#16)
49	5 December 2012	Skyfall	$10,450,489	The Perks of Being a Wallflower (#3), Pitch Perfect preview (#4), Red Dawn (#5), Talaash (#7), Fun Size (#9), Back to 1942 (#12), Met Opera: The Tempest (#15), Celeste and Jesse Forever (#19)
50	12 December 2012	Skyfall	$6,479,231	Pitch Perfect (#2), Here Comes the Boom (#5), The Man with the Iron Fists (#9), Trouble with the Curve (#10), Khiladi 786 (#13), Masquerade (#17)
51	19 December 2012	Skyfall	$4,632,226	Rise of the Guardians (#2), Love Is All You Need (#11), Paris-Manhattan (#12), Liberal Arts (#13), Met Opera: Clemenza di Tito (#16)
52	26 December 2012	Skyfall	$3,213,845	Dabangg 2

Notes

- A One night screening at selected cinemas of digitally remastered and enhanced versions of two first-season episodes of Star Trek: The Next Generation ("Where No One Has Gone Before" and "Datalore") to celebrate the release of Season 1 on Blu-ray.
- B A biennial event showcasing anime films for two weeks, held by Madman Entertainment in cinemas in capital cities across the country. The films are screened in their native Japanese with English subtitles. In 2012, the films were: From Up on Poppy Hill, Wolf Children, Berserk Golden Age Arc I: The Egg of the King, and Children Who Chase Lost Voices.

== See also ==
- List of Australian films – Australian films by year
- 2012 in film
