= Laurence Muir =

Australian philanthropist and businessman (1925 – 2010)

Personal details
- Born: March 3, 1925 Victoria, Australia
- Died: April 25, 2010 (aged 85)
- Education: Scotch College, University of Melbourne

Sir Laurence Macdonald Muir, VRD, FSIA, FAIM (March 3, 1925 – April 21, 2010) was an Australian businessman and philanthropist.

== Early life ==
Muir was born in Victoria and educated at Scotch College (Captain of School 1942) and the University of Melbourne. After service in the Royal Australian Navy from late 1942 until 1946, he gained a Law Degree and was admitted as a Barrister and Solicitor of the Supreme Court of Victoria in 1950. From 1950 to 1980, Muir was a leading share broker specialising in underwriting major capital raising for large Australian companies and a senior partner with Potter Partners.

== Business ==
Sir Muir served on the Boards of ANZ Bank, Alcoa of Australia Limited, Australian Consolidated Industries Limited, Wormald International Limited, National Commercial Union Limited, The Herald and Weekly Times Limited, Hudson Conway Limited, Publishing and Broadcasting Limited, Crown Limited, State Development Fund Ltd, and Templeton Global Growth Fund. He was Chairman of Liquid Air Australia Limited and served on the Air Liquide International Board. He served on the General Motors Australian Advisory Council since its formation in 1978.

He also served the Federal and State Governments and was a member of the Parliament House Construction Authority, the Australian National University Council, and he was the inaugural Chairman of the Canberra Development Board.

== Philanthropy ==
Muir was Knighted in the 1981 Birthday Honours for distinguished service to the community. His activities since then combined corporate board work with government and community service.

He was involved in many charitable organisations and was a patron of both the Microsurgery Foundation and The Baker IDI Heart and Diabetes Institute. He was a founding trustee of Earthwatch Australia and a board member of the Sir Robert Menzies Trust. He was an honorary life trustee of CEDA.

At the request of the Commonwealth Government, he served for two terms on the Council of the Australian National University and served for eleven years (the duration) on the Board of the Parliament House Construction Authority.

In 1981, Muir established for the Federal Government the Canberra Development Board and as its chairman for eight years, he was responsible for stimulating the private sector growth of the ACT Economy. During this time, he assisted the Government in attracting and staging the IAAF World Cup in Athletics in Canberra. As Chairman of the Parliament House Construction Authority Artworks Advisory Committee, he worked with arts and crafts professionals from all over Australia to assemble the notable collection of 20th-Century Art, which is a feature of the new Parliament House.

In 1980, he chaired on behalf of CEDA (of which he was a life trustee) a two-day conference in Canberra involving federal ministers, opposition spokesmen, Trade Union leaders, treasure officials, academics, and forty business leaders. The Agenda explored the need for a business round table to be available for consultation with the Government, and as a result, the Australian Business Council was formed about 20 months later.

Throughout the eighties and early nineties, he served on the General Motors Advisory Council and was active on the Anticancer Business (Fundraiser) Committee, which he had chaired since its formation.

Muir was involved in setting up the Annual Cup Day Appeal, The Daffodil Day and more recently assisted Relay for Life to raise funds for the Cancer Council of Victoria. He served ten years on the Board of the Royal Flying Doctor Service (Victorian Division) and was a corporate fundraiser for the initial National Heart Foundation of Australia, Anticancer Council, and Menzies Foundation appeals. He served for fifteen years on the Menzies Foundation Board and ten years on the National Heart Foundation Board. For five years in the mid eighties he chaired the Australian Brain Foundation, after which he served for ten years as a Trustee for the Foundation for Development Co-operation (Australian only private aid agency helping the people of underdeveloped countries).

In the lead up to the 1996 bid by Melbourne for the right to host the Olympic Games, he served as a Commissioner responsible for winning the votes of all IOC members in the Caribbean, Central and South American Regions. After five visits to fifteen countries and visitation from the IOC officials, the quest ended unsuccessfully in Tokyo.

For almost forty years, he was involved in the Alfred Hospital and Baker Medical Research Fund Raising effort. After ten years of service on the Alfred Board, he served as a board member and later Chairman of The Baker (Australia's Premier Heart Research Institute). He led several fundraising appeals for these institutions. For the past 20 years, he has been Patron of The Baker Medical Research Institute.

In 1987, he helped to bring the Earthwatch Institute to Australia and with Sir John Crawford, Professor Ruther Ford Robertson, and Dr Jim Vernon, was a founding Trustee. He remained active in Earthwatch until his Death and was Co-Patron with Sir Ninian Stephen. Earthwatch has now funded and organised some 3000 scientific missions to save the Planet.

With Dr Bernard O'Brien, Sir William Kilpatrick, and Dr "Weary" Dunlop, he helped to establish the Micro Surgery Foundation in the early seventies. Various fundraising appeals and representation to State and Federal governments resulted in the opening of a research centre at St. Vincents Hospital. Sir Laurence Muir is a Patron of the Microsurgery Foundation at the Bernard O’Brien Research Centre.

In the mid seventies, Laurence was challenged to raise $13 million to build St Vincent's Private Hospital Melbourne for Sister Fabian the then-Head of the Sisters of Charity at St Vincents. Urged on by the devout sister ("God will find a way, Mr. Muir") the goal was achieved by persuading the State Government to provide a Government guarantee thereby making the loan a "30/20" semi-governmental which the Institutions were happy to subscribe at a rate the hospital could handle.

In the seventies, he chaired a two-day conference of independent school Headmaster and Catholic school representatives, resulting in the formation of the National Council of Independent Schools. For many years he served on the Council representing Scotch College and was deputy chairman to Ian Dixon of Shore.

In 1973, as Deputy Chairman of the Scotch College Council, he was asked to chair his third fundraising appeal. This led to the establishment of the Scotch College Foundation, which harnesses the funding resources of the whole Scotch Family to finance the building and development program of the School. To date, the foundation has raised $37 Million, and most similar schools in Australia have adopted the format.

In the mid-eighties he served with Sir Eric Neal as chairman for the Finance Committee for the 6th Duke of Edinburgh Study Conference. The corporate response was such that after a successful conference, a surplus of $250,000 was available for the future.

In 1984 he founded and funded the Delta Society of Australia. The aim of the society was to make Governments and the Community more aware of the benefits of pets both as companions and for therapy. Working with a group of leading Veterinarians and Dr Warwick Anderson of the Baker Medical Research Institute, a three-year study of heart patients showed that patients benefited substantially from a companion animal.

In the seventies, he set up the Australian Innovation Corporation with ten major Institutions as shareholders. The aim of the company was to encourage the commercial development of Australian inventions.

In 1984, at the request of the Commonwealth Government, he chaired a partnership between the Government and the private-sector, which was designed to encourage the commercial development of medical equipment and innovations in the major public hospitals and university laboratories. The Australian Biomedical Corporation was launched in the mid eighties with Muir as chairman. It was subsequently the subject of a private sector takeover.

In 1986, he worked with Sir Ian McLennan and Mr Baillieu Myer and the Minister for Science Hon. Barry Jones to establish the National Science and Technology Centre. In 1988 the centre was built in the Parliamentary Triangle in Canberra enabling science to take its place with the Arts and the Law. The Board of the National Science and Technology Centre was asked by the Government to take hands on science to every part of Australia, which has happened.

Sir Laurence assisted Prof Michael Gore through corporate sponsorship to establish Questacon. He served as deputy chairman from 1988 to 1996.

Sir Laurence Muir died on 21 April 2010, aged 85.

== Centenary Medal ==
He was awarded a Centenary Medal in 2001 "for outstanding service to the business, financial and research community".

== Publications ==
In 2007, Muir published: "Some Inspirational People", Subtitled: 15 Inspirational Australians Profiled by Laurence MacDonald Muir.

Those Profiled were:

- Reg Ansett
- John Birrell
- Professor Adrienne Clarke
- Denis Cordner
- Geoff Donaldson
- Sir Edward Dunlop
- Dr Michael Gore
- David Hains
- Douglas Samuel Heywood
- Rupert Murdoch
- Bernard McCarthy O'Brien
- James Packer
- Sir Arvi Parbo
- Richard Pratt
- Lyn Swinburne
