= Alex Watts & the Foreign Tongue =

Australian rock band

Alex Watts & the Foreign Tongue are an Australian rock band from Melbourne. The group was formed in 2010 as a solo project for singer/songwriter Alex Watts, who continues to perform with and without the band.

== Biography ==
Originally encompassing punk and blues based rock, the Alex Watts & the Foreign Tongue shifted over its several releases to include singer-songwriter pop, rhythm and blues and soul.

As of 2014, Watts expanded the group from a traditional rock'n'roll four piece to encompass horns, keyboards and backing vocals.

In 2011, the band released the Desperate Love EP, which was typified by its raw, live sound, and moved stylistically from pop, garage rock, country and acoustic music.

In November of that year the band appeared at Queenscliff Music Festival alongside The Triffids and Kimbra.

In 2012 the band released This Haunting, a single co-written with Mick Thomas, of Weddings, Parties, Anything, which received a self-directed video. The song was well received in both Australia and Europe, receiving airplay from the main community radio stations in Australia. From that point on the band began a regiment of constant touring, helping to cement their reputation as an exciting live act.

They appeared at The St Kilda Festival, one of the largest events in the Melbourne music calendar, in both 2013 and 2014.

In 2013, Watts took a break from the band to undertake an acoustic tour of Australia followed by a tour of house concerts in the UK in December 2013-January 2014. These shows led him to record a solo EP, Sing, Strum & Strut, which was released through his own label, Astound Records, on 27 May 2014.

== Members ==
- Alex Watts - vocals, guitar
- Andy Phillips - guitar
- Michael McHugh - drums
- Brian Juffs - bass
- Jason Jennings - baritone sax
