= Jacinta John =

Australian actress, producer and director

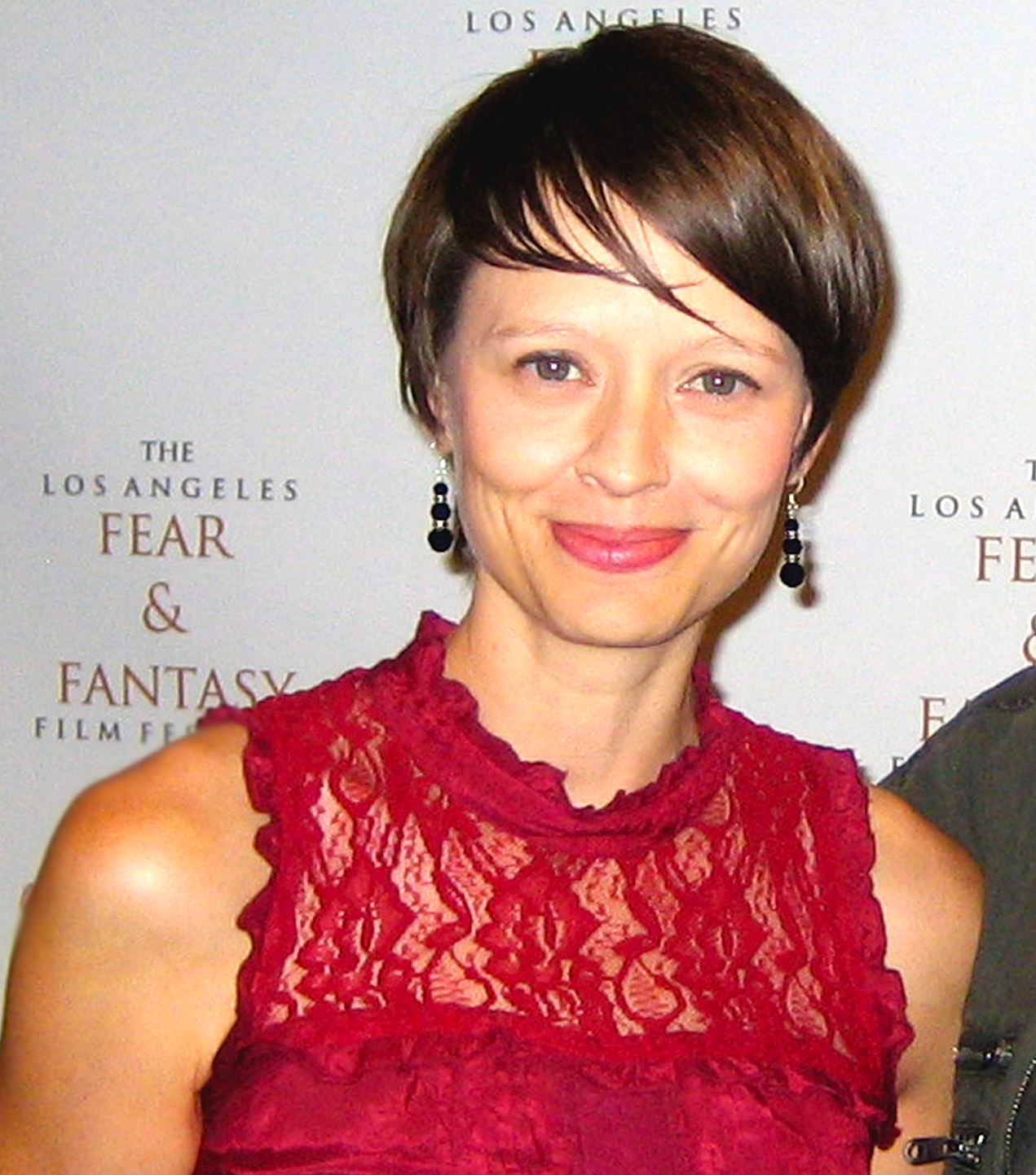
- Born: Jacinta Claudia John; Perth, Western Australia
- Education: London Academy of Music and Dramatic Art
- Occupations: Actress, producer, director
- Years active: 2001 – present

Jacinta John is an Australian director, actress and producer. She is best known for her performance as Miss Casewell in the (2012–2013) 60th anniversary tour of Agatha Christie's The Mousetrap, which played to an audience of over 150,000 people across Australasia.

== Life and career ==
Born in Perth, Western Australia, she attended the Presbyterian Ladies' College in Peppermint Grove, Perth. She graduated from the University of Sydney (BA in Film & Performance studies) where she was awarded the Walter Reid Memorial Prize. She travelled to London where she completed an MA in Classical acting at the London Academy of Music and Dramatic Art. In 2010 she became an Australia Council Artstart recipient, which allowed her to study Viewpoints and Suzuki at the Saratoga International Theater Institute (SITI) in New York City.

After dabbling in theatre producing early in her career, she turned her attention towards cinema. Her first feature iSOLATE, screened on the opening night of the 2012 CinefestOz film festival alongside The Intouchables, and 33 Postcards. In 2013 she returned to theatre, only this time, as a director of musical theatre.

Her mother, Suzanne John, worked as a journalist for the ABC, Nine Network and Seven Network in Perth, Western Australia. Her cousin is actor Callan McAuliffe.

== Producing and directing ==
=== Theatre ===
- (2013–2014) - Resident Director Agatha Christie's A Murder is Announced (A Miss Marple Mystery), Australia
- (2014) - Assistant Director Miracle City by Nick Enright & Max Lambert
- (2015) - Assistant Director Roald Dahl's Matilda the Musical, Australia
- (2016) - Assistant Director Groundhog Day – Book by Danny Rubin, music and lyrics by Tim Minchin, directed by Matthew Warchus, premiered at The Old Vic
- (2016) - Director The Hatpin a musical by James Millar (book and lyrics) and Peter Rutherford, composer. Victorian College of the Arts
- (2017) - Resident Director Roald Dahl's Matilda the Musical, Australia
- (2018) - Resident Director Mamma Mia! the Musical, Australia
- (2018) - Co-director All Out of Love: The Musical, Manila
- (2019) - Resident Director Billy Elliot the Musical
- (2021) - Australian Associate Director Moulin Rouge! the Musical
- (2022) - International Associate Director Moulin Rouge! the Musical, Korea
- (2023) - International Associate Director Moulin Rouge! the Musical, Japan
- (2025) - International Associate Director Moulin Rouge! the Musical, World Tour

=== Film and television ===
- (2012) - Producer iSOLATE (feature film)
- (2013) - Producer, co-director Mask (short)
- (2014) - Executive Producer Under The Bridge (feature film)
- (2015) - Producer 1 + 1 = 11 (feature film)

== Acting ==
Theatre

- (2001) - Instant Karma Bondi Pavilion Theatre
- (2003) - Love, Madness and Poetry Seymour Centre
- (2003) - Holiday in the sun Sidetrack Theatre
- (2003) - Skylight New Theatre
- (2004) - Instant Karma Darlinghurst Theatre
- (2004) - Vicious Streaks Darlinghurst Theatre
- (2005) - The Mysterious Demise of One Brody Marie / Broken Dreams Griffin Theatre Company
- (2005) - Godzone Tap Gallery
- (2007) - Flying Solo Riverside Theatre
- (2009) - The Dark Room Black Swan State Theatre Company
- (2009) - Pool (No Water) Black Swan State Theatre Company Nominated for Best Supporting Actor (Female)
- (2012–2013) - Agatha Christie's The Mousetrap

Film and Television

- (2006) - All Saints (TV series)
- (2007) - McLeod's Daughters (TV series)
- (2008) - Lullaby (short)
- (2010) - 1MC: Something of Vengeance (feature film)
- (2010) - Tough Nuts: Australia's Hardest Criminals (TV series)
- (2012) - iSOLATE (feature film) For which she won the Best Actress Award at both the LA Fear and Fantasy Film Festival, and The Indie Gems Film Festival
- (2012) - Rake (TV series)
- (2013) - Mask (short)
- (2014) - Under The Bridge (feature film)
