= 2008 in Australian television =

The year 2008 in Australian television was the 53rd year of continuous operation.

== Events ==
- 14 January – The Nine Network undergoes a major revamp in its production and logo and on-air graphics as a part of a new network re-launch, and after a two-year absence, returns the famous "Nine Balls" logo, except instead of balls, they use discs. It will see an overhaul of news and current affairs graphics (news graphics revised, not current affairs) and studios sets (also didn't happen) and a general on-air look.
- 1 February – Former The Great Outdoors host Shelley Craft quits Channel Seven and moves to Channel Nine to join the team of Domestic Blitz and take over from Toni Pearen as host of Australia's Funniest Home Videos.
- 7 February – Veteran television king Ray Martin quits the Nine Network after 30 years with the network.
- 8 February – ABC TV is rebranded ABC1, which is visible on on-air graphics from 12:00 pm.
- 8 February – Long running Australian soap opera Neighbours airs on the BBC in the UK for the very last time after being shown for 22 years. It will switch over to air on Five on 11 February.
- 12 February – The Supreme Court of Victoria places an injunction on the broadcast and exhibition of the Nine Network's drama series Underbelly in Victoria, following concerns that the series, which depicts Melbourne's gangland wars, could prejudice an ongoing murder trial.
- 14 March – A Current Affair broadcasts its 5000th episode and celebrates its 20th anniversary.
- 30 March – Today introduces a three-and-a-half-hour format, starting at 5.30 am and finishing at 9 am.
- 3 April – Kate Ritchie (Sally Fletcher), one of the original 1988 cast members of Home and Away, leaves the series after twenty years.
- 7 April – The Nine Network makes the first episodes of the new series Canal Road available for download over the Internet, ahead of its television broadcast on 16 April.
- 27 April – Jack Chambers wins the first season of So You Think You Can Dance Australia.
- 4 May – Kate Ritchie wins the Gold Logie Award for the Most Popular Personality on Australian Television for the second consecutive year at the 2008 Logie Awards.
- 7 May – SBS TV launches a revamped version of its logo, as well as a new slogan: "Six Billion Stories and counting".
- 27 May – Nine Network revived the series Wheel of Fortune under a new title of Million Dollar Wheel of Fortune and its production company Sony Pictures Television (the same company used in the US flagship counterpart, and offers a top prize of AU$1,000,000. The series shortly cancelled after five weeks of air on 27 June due to low ratings, while the same format would later be adopted in the US version three months later, with the first top prize win occurred 14 October 2008.
- 2 June – The Seven Network apologises after airing an episode of the hospital drama All Saints in which it is suggested that a child born of an incestuous relationship is likely to result in the child having Down's syndrome.
- 1 July – 16-year-old guitarist Smokin' Joe Robinson wins the second season of Australia's Got Talent.
- 18 July – Hi-5 airs its 400th episode.
- 21 July – The final episode of Network Ten's baddie reality show Big Brother Australia airs. The eighth and final season was won by 52-year-old grandmother Terri Munro.
- 25 July – The final episode of the Nine Network's late-night news program Nightline airs after 16 years of broadcast.
- 26 July – Peter Cundall's last appearance on Gardening Australia before retiring from Australian Landscapes. It goes to air on ABC1.
- 3 August – The final episode of the Nine Network's flagship news and current affairs program Sunday airs. Sunday was axed by the network after 27 years of broadcast.
- 26 August - Australian dramedy series Packed to the Rafters premieres on Seven Network, which broadcasts every Tuesday at 8:30 pm.
- 28 August – Australia's Naughtiest Home Videos, a revival of the spin-off to Australia's Funniest Home Videos, rebadged on the Nine Network. It last time played on the network is when the late CEO, Kerry Packer banned the spin-off for life 16 years ago.
- 10 October – Today Tonight draws with a final goodbye with Anna Coren in the hot-seat before heading to CNN in Hong Kong. Matt White replaced by Coren the following Monday.
- 20 October – National Nine News changes its name to Nine News when it launches a new-look – losing viewers to Seven News.
- 9 November – McLeod's Daughters actor Luke Jacobz and his partner Luda Kroiter win the eighth season of Dancing with the Stars.
- 23 November – The sixth season of Australian Idol was won by Wes Carr.
- 1 December – The Seven Network wins the ratings year for the second consecutive year, and its third overall, with a record ratings share of 28.7%. The two other commercial networks, the Nine Network (27.2%) and Network Ten (21.0%), came in second and third place respectively. The two public broadcasters, ABC1 and SBS TV, managed a ratings share of 17.5% and 5.6% respectively.
- 5 December – Heather Foord presents her final weeknight bulletin on Nine News Queensland. Her final appearance wraps up a year of poor ratings for the once-leading bulletin, which lost all 40 weeks of ratings to the rival Seven News Brisbane in 2008.

== Celebrity deaths ==
Name	Age	Date of death	Broadcast description
Clinton Grybas	32	5 January 2008	AFL and sports commentator and presenter
Sandra Harvey	49	21 January 2008	Four Corners producer
Heath Ledger	28	22 January 2008	Australian-born international actor (Sweat, Roar)
Andrew Harwood	62	6 February 2008	Host (It's Academic, Good Morning Sydney, Til Ten)
Steve Andrews	38	10 March 2008	QTQ9 voice over announcer
Jessica Jacobs	17	10 May 2008	Actress (The Saddle Club, Fergus McPhail, Holly's Heroes)
Reg Lindsay, AM	79	5 August 2008	Australian singer and Host, (The Reg Lindsay Country Hour, Country Homestead)
Christie Allen	53	12 August 2008	Australian singer and performer Countdown performer
Mark Priestley	32	27 August 2008	Actor (All Saints)
Michael Pate	88	1 September 2008	Actor (Matlock Police)
Kevin Heinze	80	1 September 2008	Horticulturalist and Host (Sow What)
Peter Leonard	66	23 September 2008	Journalist and WIN News Canberra newsreader.
Brian Courtis	63	29 September 2008	Melbourne television critic
Rob Guest	57	2 October 2008	Host and theatre performer (Man O Man, Special Missing Pieces)
Levi Kereama	27	4 October 2008	Australian Idol 2003 contestant
Dennis Pryor	83	30 November 2008	Melbourne television critic
Richard Marsland	32	6 December 2008	Writer (Rove, The Glass House, Newstopia)

=== New channels ===
- 7 January – Sky News Business Channel
- 17 March – Nine HD
- 28 April – Channel Ten Darwin
- 22 June – BBC HD
- 22 June – Discovery HD
- 22 June – National Geographic Channel HD
- 22 June – Fox Sports HD
- 22 June – ESPN HD
- 1 November – CBeebies
- 1 November – BBC Knowledge
- 1 November – 111 Hits

== Premieres ==
=== Telemovies ===
==== Domestic telemovies ====
Program	Network	Debut date
Emerald Falls (Note: Emerald Falls was originally scheduled to air on 21 March 2008 (Good Friday) at 8:30 pm on Network Ten. But this was later changed to 23 March (Easter Sunday) at 9:00 pm.)	Network Ten	23 March 2008
Valentine's Day	ABC1	6 July 2008
Scorched	Nine Network	31 August 2008
The Prime Minister is Missing	ABC1	23 October 2008
Menzies and Churchill at War	ABC1	30 October 2008
Infamous Victory: Ben Chifley's Battle for Coal	ABC1	30 October 2008
The Informant	Network Ten	14 November 2008
A Very Barry Christmas	ABC1	25 December 2008

==== International telemovies ====
Telemovie title	Network	Debut date
(United States) / (Canada) Ben 10: Race Against Time	Cartoon Network	20 September 2008
(United States) Camp Rock	Disney Channel	26 September 2008
(United States) Knight Rider	Seven Network	27 September 2008
(United Kingdom) Wallace and Gromit: A Matter of Loaf and Death	ABC1	2 December 2008
(United States) 24: Redemption	Seven Network	5 December 2008
(United Kingdom) Rather You Than Me	UK.TV	27 December 2008
(United Kingdom) The Curse of Steptoe	UK.TV	28 December 2008

=== Miniseries ===
==== International miniseries ====
Miniseries	Network	Airdate(s)
(United Kingdom) The Line of Beauty	ABC TV	13, 20 and 27 January 2008
(United States) The Andromeda Strain	Showcase	20 and 27 April 2008
(United Kingdom) Sense and Sensibility	UK.TV	3, 10 and 17 July
(United Kingdom) Talk to Me	UK.TV	15, 22 and 29 July, 5 August
(United Kingdom) Victoria's Empire	UK.TV	18 and 25 August 1 September
(United Kingdom) Cranford	UK.TV	21 and 28 August 4, 11 and 18 September
(United States) Tin Man	Seven Network	26 and 27 December 2008

=== Documentary specials ===
==== Domestic documentary specials ====
Program	Network	Debut date
Jihad Sheilas	ABC TV	5 February 2008
The Spirit of Australian Sport: Australian Football	The History Channel	June 2008
Miracle on Everest	ABC1	15 July 2008
Walk Like a Man	SBS TV	22 July 2008
The Spirit of Australian Sport: Swimming	The History Channel	30 July 2008
Roller Derby Dolls	ABC1	9 September 2008
The Spirit of Australian Sport: Rugby League	The History Channel	17 September 2008
Beyond Kokoda: War Without Mercy	The History Channel	25 September 2008
The Fibros and the Silvertails	ABC1	9 October 2008
No Way, Get F*#ked, F*#k Off!	SBS TV	11 October 2008
How Kevin Bacon Cured Cancer	ABC1	28 October 2008
The Intervention (about the NT National Emergency Response)	ABC1	30 October 2008
The Spirit of Australian Sport: Horse Racing	The History Channel	3 November 2008
Searching 4 Sandeep	ABC1	13 November 2008
Humpbacks: From Fire to Ice	ABC1	16 November 2008
The Howard Years	ABC1	17 November 2008
Hairtales	ABC1	20 November 2008
The Making of My Favourite Australian	ABC1	10 December 2008

==== International documentary specials ====
Telemovie title	Network	Debut date
(United Kingdom) How To Commit The Perfect murder	SBS TV	24 February 2008
(United Kingdom) The Story of Bohemian Rhapsody	Ovation	3 March 2008
(United Kingdom) Is TV Bad for My Kids	The LifeStyle Channel	9 March
(United Kingdom) William & Catherine: A Royal Romance	Nine Network	17 March 2008
(Canada) Once Upon a Time: Walt Disney	SBS TV	23 March 2008
(Canada) China's Sexual Revolution	SBS TV	25 March 2008
(United States) Life After People	The History Channel	19 May 2008
(Canada) Calling All Aliens	SBS TV	22 and 29 June 2008
(United Kingdom) J.K. Rowling: A Year in the Life	Seven Network	13 July 2008
(United Kingdom) Jamie Oliver's Eat to Save Your Life	Network Ten	16 July 2008
(United Kingdom) Jamie Oliver's Fowl Dinners	Network Ten	23 July 2008
(United Kingdom) How To Beat Your Kid's Asthma	The LifeStyle Channel	25 July 2008
(United States) Hannah Montana & Miley Cyrus: Best of Both Worlds Concert	Disney Channel	26 July 2008
(Uruguay) / (France) Stranded: The Andes Plane Crash Survivors	SBS TV	3 August 2008
(United Kingdom) Chelsea Flow Show 2008	The LifeStyle Channel	31 August
(United Kingdom) Crufts 2008	The LifeStyle Channel	7 September
(Canada) As Seen on TV: The K-Tel Story	SBS TV	10 October 2008
(United States) Mister President	SBS TV	31 October 2008
(United States) Election Day	SBS TV	4 November 2008
(United States) The War Briefing	SBS TV	4 November 2008
(United Kingdom) Michael Jackson: What Really Happened	ABC2	5 November 2008
(United Kingdom) The Mystery of the Mary Celeste: Revealed	ABC1	13 November 2008
(United States) Britney: For the Record	Network Ten	2 December 2008
(France) Empire State Building Murders	SBS TV	21 December 2008
(Germany) The Germanic Tribes	SBS TV	21 December 2008
(United Kingdom) Princes in the Tower	ABC1	28 December 2008
(United Kingdom) 638 Ways to Kill Castro	ABC1	29 December 2008
(United Kingdom) Expedition Bhutan	ABC1	Unknown

== Sports broadcasting rights ==
- A-League – Association football

The A-League broadcasting rights were held exclusively by subscription television network Fox Sports for the 2008–09 season. Fox Sports broadcast every match of the season live-to-air, and also screened a weekly "highlights" program.

- Australian Football League (AFL) – Australian rules football

The Australian Football League (AFL) broadcasting rights were jointly held by two free-to-air networks, Seven Network and Network Ten, and one subscription television network, Fox Sports, for the 2008 AFL season. Generally the eight matches per round were divided as such: Fox Sports aired four games all live-to-air (a Saturday afternoon match, a Saturday night match, a Sunday afternoon match and the Sunday twilight match), the Seven Network aired two matches delayed (the Friday night match and a Sunday afternoon match), and Network Ten aired two matches, one live-to-air and one delayed, which consisted of a Saturday afternoon and a Saturday night match respectively. The broadcast of matches may vary between networks, and broadcast times may change depending on the area of broadcast. The 2008 AFL Grand Final was broadcast live-to-air by the Seven Network, whilst Network Ten broadcast the 2008 Brownlow Medal and the 2008 NAB Cup Grand Final.

- Olympic Games

The primary broadcaster of the 2008 Summer Olympics was the Seven Network, whilst complementary coverage was provided by SBS TV.

- Paralympic Games

The 2008 Summer Paralympics was broadcast by the Australian Broadcasting Corporation (ABC) via ABC1 and ABC2.

Sport	Network/s	Games per Week	Breakup of Games	Notes
Euro 2008 (Association Football)	Setanta Sports Australia; Special Broadcasting Service	-	Setanta Sports Australia – 27 Games Live: Replays/Highlights of all games; Special Broadcasting Service: 8 Games Live, Including: The Opening Game; 6 Other Group Matches; The Final; Highlights of all Matches.	
NBL (Basketball)	Fox Sports; Channel Nine	8	Fox Sports: 1–2 Games LIVE; Channel Nine: Weekly Highlights of 1 game each week	
NRL (Rugby league)	Channel Nine; Fox Sports – Pay-TV	8	Channel Nine – 3 Games: Friday Night AEST 7:30 pm – 9:30 pm LIVE; Friday Night AEST 9:30 pm – 11:30 pm Delayed 2 hours; Sunday Afternoon AEST 4:00 pm – 6:00 pm Delayed 1 hour; Fox Sports: 5 Games: Saturday Afternoon AEST 5:30 pm – 7:30 pm LIVE; Saturday Night AEST 7:30 pm – 9:30 pm LIVE; Saturday Night AEST 9:30 pm – 11:30 pm Delayed 2 hours; Sunday Afternoon AEST 2:30 pm – 4:30 pm LIVE; Monday Night AEST 7:00 pm – 9:00 pm LIVE; Also replays of matches broadcast on Channel Nine.	Channel Nine broadcast the 2008 NRL Grand Final and 2008 State of Origin series live.
Other Football (Association Football)	Fox Sports; ESPN Australia; Setanta Sports Australia; SBS	4	Fox Sports: All Socceroos Matches; Asian World Cup Qualifiers; English Premier League (8–10 Matches Live per Week); Asian Champions League; Coca-Cola Championship; English League Cup; Setanta Sports Australia: Scottish Premier League; English Conference; French Ligue 1; Portuguese Liga; German Bundesliga; Italian Serie A; English FA Cup; UEFA Cup; Copa Libertadores; Copa Sudamericana; World Cup Qualifiers from Europe/South America; ESPN Australia: Spanish La Liga; Italian Serie A; UEFA Champions League; UEFA Cup; MLS; Special Broadcasting Service: UEFA Champions League; UEFA Cup; FA Cup	

== See also ==
- 2008 in Australia
- List of Australian films of 2008
