= 2008 in Australia =

- Decades: 1980s; 1990s; 2000s; 2010s; 2020s
- See also: 2008 in Australian television; 2008 in Australian literature; Other events of 2008; Timeline of Australian history

The following lists events that happened during 2008 in Australia.

2008 in Australia
- Monarch: Elizabeth II
- Governor-General: Michael Jeffery, then Quentin Bryce
- Prime minister: Kevin Rudd
- Elections: NT, WA, ACT

== Incumbents ==
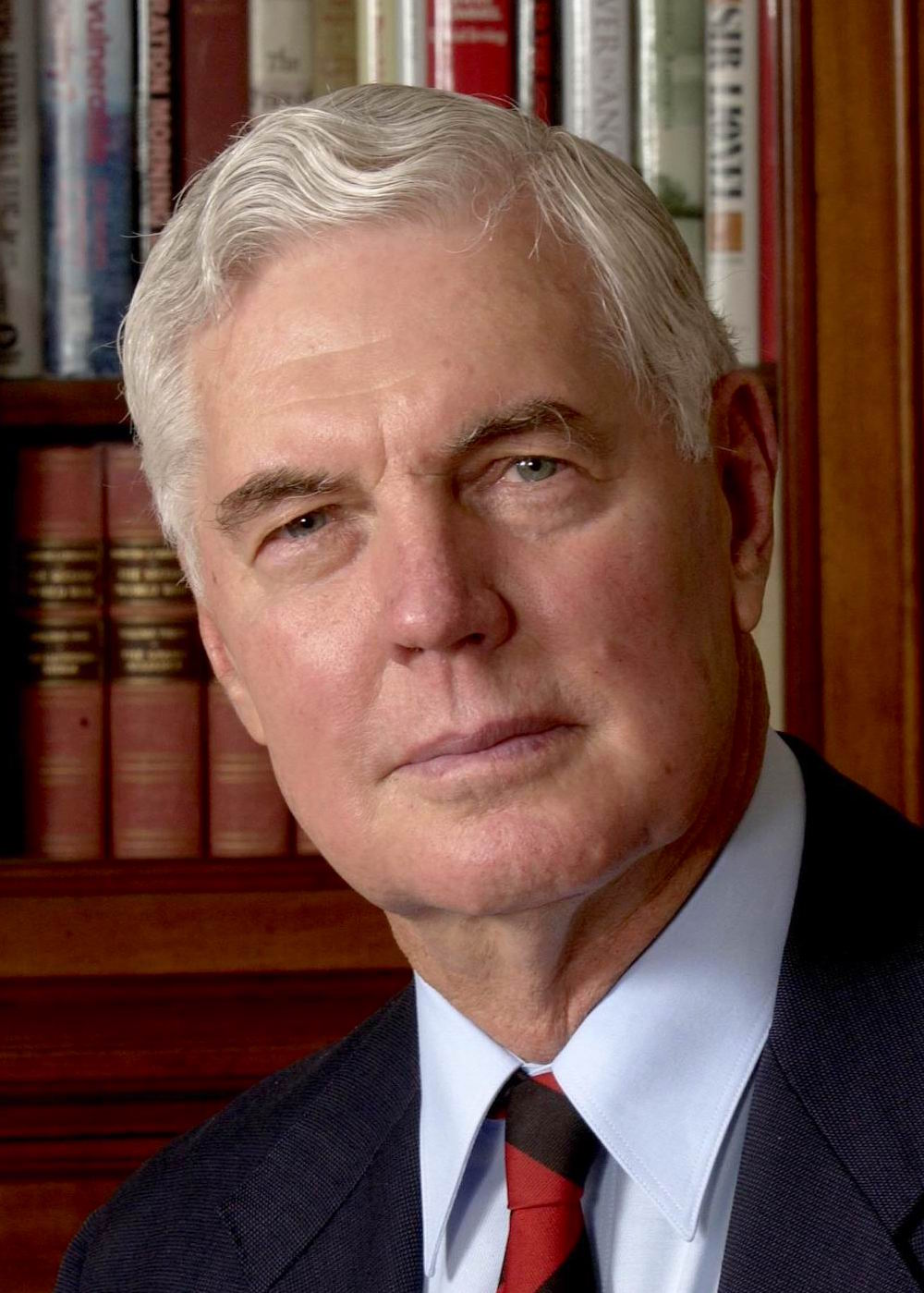
Michael Jeffery

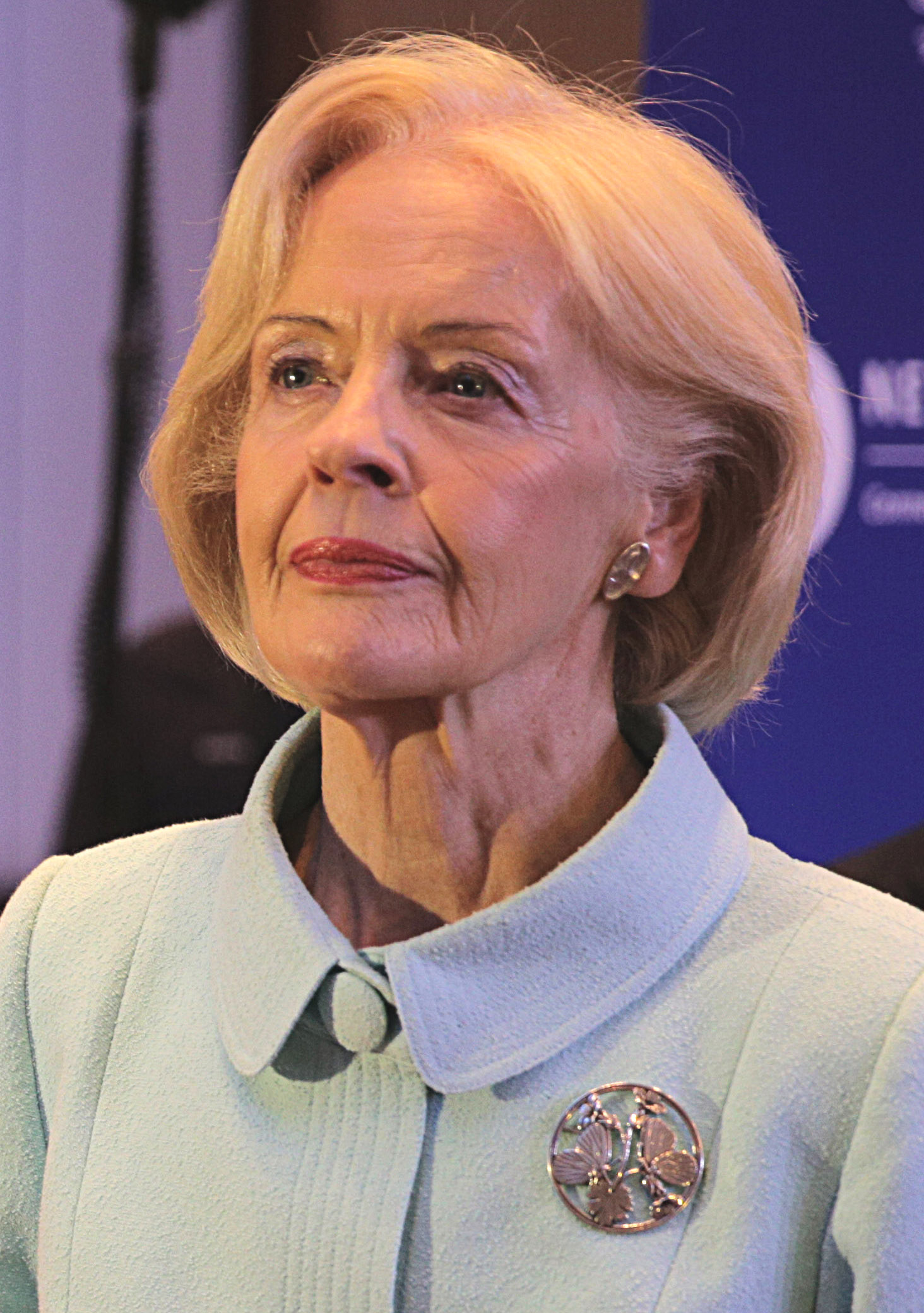
Quentin Bryce

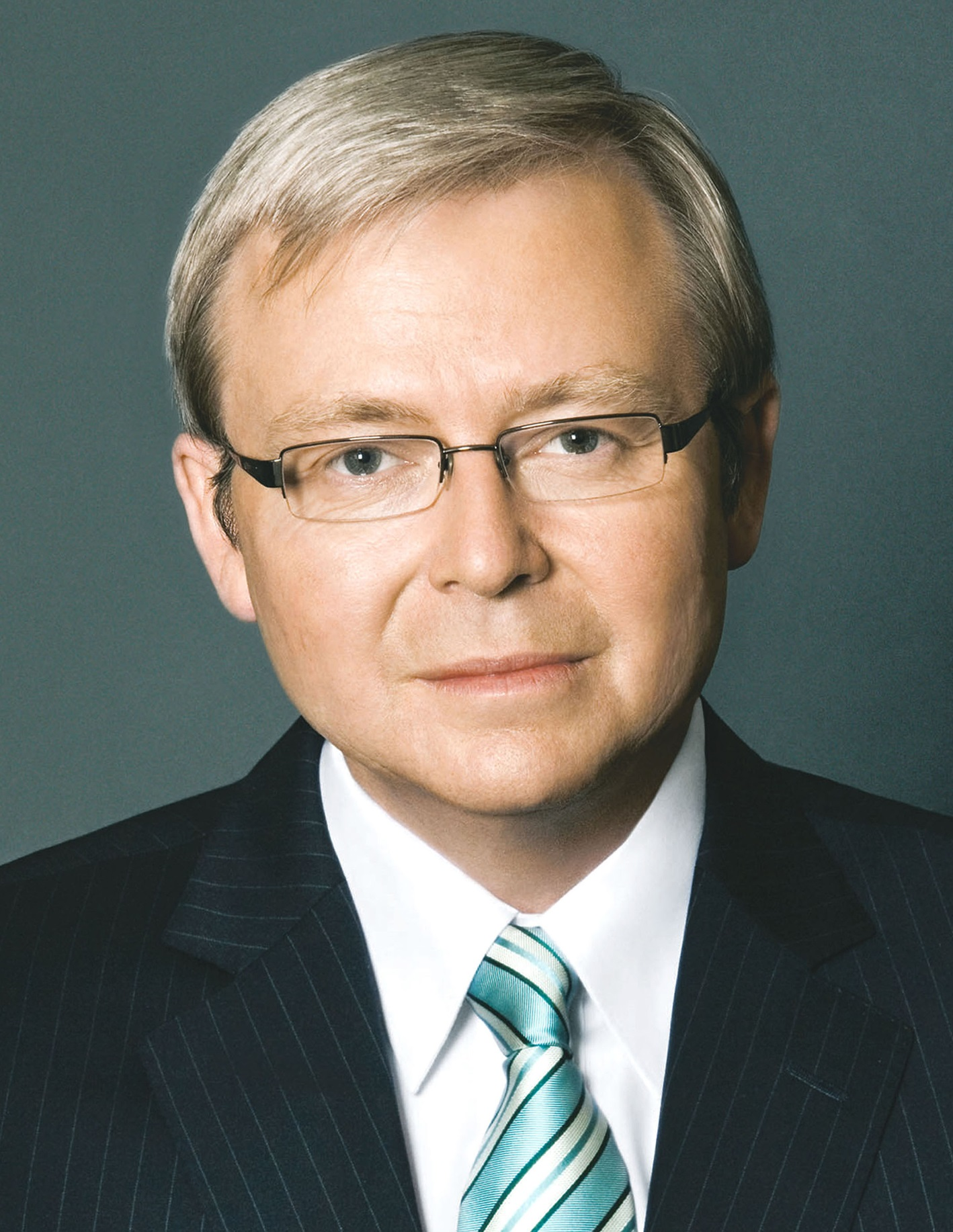
Kevin Rudd

- Monarch – Elizabeth II
- Governor-General – Michael Jeffery (until 5 September), then Quentin Bryce
- Prime Minister – Kevin Rudd
  - Deputy Prime Minister – Julia Gillard
  - Opposition Leader – Brendan Nelson (until 16 September), then Malcolm Turnbull
- Chief Justice – Murray Gleeson (until 29 August), then Robert French

=== State and territory leaders ===
- Premier of New South Wales – Morris Iemma (until 5 September), then Nathan Rees
  - Opposition Leader – Barry O'Farrell
- Premier of Queensland – Anna Bligh
  - Opposition Leader – Jeff Seeney (until 29 January), then Lawrence Springborg
- Premier of South Australia – Mike Rann
  - Opposition Leader – Martin Hamilton-Smith
- Premier of Tasmania – Paul Lennon (until 26 May), then David Bartlett
  - Opposition Leader – Will Hodgman
- Premier of Victoria – John Brumby
  - Opposition Leader – Ted Baillieu
- Premier of Western Australia – Alan Carpenter (until 23 September), then Colin Barnett
  - Opposition Leader – Paul Omodei (until 17 January), then Troy Buswell (until 4 August), then Colin Barnett (until 23 September), then Eric Ripper
- Chief Minister of the Australian Capital Territory – Jon Stanhope
  - Opposition Leader – Zed Seselja
- Chief Minister of the Northern Territory – Paul Henderson
  - Opposition Leader – Jodeen Carney (until 29 January), then Terry Mills
- Chief Minister of Norfolk Island – Andre Nobbs

=== Governors and administrators ===
- Governor of New South Wales – Marie Bashir
- Governor of Queensland – Quentin Bryce (until 29 July), then Penelope Wensley
- Governor of South Australia – Kevin Scarce
- Governor of Tasmania – William Cox (until 2 April), then Peter Underwood
- Governor of Victoria – David de Kretser
- Governor of Western Australia – Ken Michael
- Administrator of the Australian Indian Ocean Territories – Neil Lucas (until 22 February)
- Administrator of Norfolk Island – Owen Walsh
- Administrator of the Northern Territory – Tom Pauling

== Events ==
=== Entire year ===
- Year of the Scout.
- Year of Physical Activity.

=== January ===
- 1 January onwards – Torrential rain causes widespread flooding and damage to parts of South East Queensland and the North Coast of New South Wales.
- 11 January – An Airbus A319 lands at the new Wilkins Runway in the Australian Antarctic Territory, becoming the first passenger flight from Australia to Antarctica.
- 15 January – An Australian Sea Shepherd Conservation Society activist, Benjamin Potts, and his British colleague, Giles Lane, are detained on board the Japanese whaling vessel Yushin Maru No. 2 after boarding the ship which was inside the Southern Ocean Whale Sanctuary near Antarctica.
- 15 January – Victoria Police officers use capsicum spray to subdue unruly Greek spectators at the 2008 Australian Open, during a match between Konstantinos Economidis and Fernando González.
- 17 January – An explosion in a wine processing shed at Drayton's Winery in the New South Wales Hunter Valley kills two men including winery owner Trevor Drayton, and injures one.
- 23 January – After 128 years, the final edition of The Bulletin is published. Its demise was announced on 20 January.

=== February ===
- 8 February – A controversial plan to deepen Melbourne's shipping channels by dredging Port Phillip Bay begins.
- 12 February – Federal Parliament was opened with a Welcome to Country, the first time in its history that this has occurred.
- 13 February – An apology containing the word "sorry" is made by Kevin Rudd to Indigenous Australians for the stolen generation as the first order of business of the new Parliament.
- 22 February – Parliament descends into chaos with opposition frontbenchers ejected, question time suspended and speakers unable to control the house. A cardboard cut-out of the Prime Minister is brought into the parliament by opposition members angry about sitting time on a Friday.

=== March ===
- 12 March – Adelaide experiences a national record heat wave for an Australian capital city, recording over ten straight days of temperatures over 35 degrees Celsius.
- 14 March – Former New South Wales government minister Milton Orkopoulos is found guilty of 28 charges of child sex offences and the supply of drugs.
- 16 March – The South Australian heat wave continues with Adelaide experiencing its 14th straight day of temperatures above 35 degrees.
- 16 March – The Finding Sydney Foundation announces it has located the wrecks of the Australian light cruiser HMAS Sydney and the German auxiliary cruiser Kormoran, which both sunk after a battle in 1941.
- 26 March – At the Council of Australian Governments meeting, the Victorian government agrees to take part in a A$10 billion rescue plan for the Murray-Darling Basin, after 15 months of negotiations.
- 27 March – The Opes Prime stockbroking firm collapses, and the Australian Securities and Investments Commission announces it is conducting an investigation into the firm's activities.
- 28 March – Mitsubishi Motors Australia Limited closes its Clovelly Park manufacturing facility, ending more than 40 years of manufacturing at the site.
- 30 March – The extension of daylight saving time by a week to standardise time in New South Wales, Victoria, the Australian Capital Territory, Tasmania and South Australia causes a "mini-Y2K problem" as computer systems, mobile phones and even the "time man" incorrectly adjust the time back one hour.
- 30 March – The gag order applied to David Hicks by the Guantanamo military commission is lifted, allowing him to discuss his detainment at Guantanamo Bay detention camp.

=== April ===
- 18 April – Nick D'Arcy has his Beijing ticket terminated following an incident at a nightclub involving former swimmer Simon Cowley.
- 19 April – The Australia 2020 Summit begins in Canberra.
- 30 April – The Victorian government agrees to implement safety measures for Melbourne taxi drivers, after dozens of taxis blockade the intersection of Flinders and Swanston Streets following the stabbing of a driver the previous day.

=== May ===
- 1 May – Five people are killed when a runabout collides with a fishing boat on Sydney Harbour.
- 17 May – Fugitive gangster Tony Mokbel arrives in Australia following his extradition from Greece.
- 22 May
  - Revolutionary Australian forum television programme Q&A broadcasts its first episode.
  - Colin Campbell Ross, hanged in 1922 for the Gun Alley Murder, is granted an official pardon.
- 26 May – Paul Lennon announces his resignation as Premier of Tasmania. His deputy, David Bartlett, is sworn in as the new Premier later in the day.
- 26 May – Camden Council in Sydney votes unanimously to reject a proposal to build a 1,200 student Islamic school in the area.

=== June ===
- 1 June – Australia ends its combat operations in Iraq, withdrawing approximately 550 troops from the region.
- 3 June – A gas explosion at a plant on Varanus Island in Western Australia severely disrupts gas supplies to the state.
- 8 June – It is revealed that New South Wales Education Minister John Della Bosca and his wife, federal Member for Robertson Belinda Neal, were allegedly involved in an altercation at a nightclub in Gosford, New South Wales.
- 28 June – A by-election is held in the federal seat of Gippsland following the resignation of the sitting MP, Peter McGauran. Darren Chester wins the by-election, retaining the seat for the National Party.

=== July ===
- 1 July – 36 State Senators elected in the 2007 election take their seats in the Australian Senate. For the first time in 31 years, the Australian Democrats have no Senators in the parliament.
- 11 July – The Apple iPhone is officially released in Australia.
- 13 July – Pope Benedict XVI arrives for his first papal visit to Australia, ahead of World Youth Day 2008.
- 15 to 20 July – World Youth Day 2008, the Catholic Church's youth festival is held in Sydney.
- 26 July – The Queensland divisions of the Liberal Party and the National Party merge to form the Liberal National Party.
- 29 July – Chris Evans, the Minister for Immigration and Citizenship, announces that the Australian government will reform the policy regarding mandatory detention of asylum seekers.

=== August ===
- 8 August – The Australian Federal Police conduct what is claimed to be the world's biggest ecstasy drugs bust, seizing A$440 million worth of the drug.
- 9 August – A general election is held in the Northern Territory with the Australian Labor Party retaining government.

=== September ===
- 5 September – Morris Iemma retires as Premier of New South Wales, and his replacement is Nathan Rees.
- 5 September – Quentin Bryce is sworn in as the first female Governor-General of Australia.
- 6 September – A general election is held in Western Australia.
- 6 September – By-elections are held in the federal electorates of Mayo and Lyne, following the resignation of MPs Alexander Downer and Mark Vaile respectively. The Liberal Party retains Mayo, but the National Party loses Lyne to an independent candidate, Rob Oakeshott.
- 14 September – The National Party agrees to support the Liberal Party to form a minority government in Western Australia. Premier Alan Carpenter announces he will resign following Labor's defeat in the 2008 WA election – the first defeat of a state Labor government in Australia in over thirteen years.
- 16 September – Malcolm Turnbull becomes Leader of the Opposition when he defeats Brendan Nelson in a ballot for the leadership of the Liberal Party of Australia.
- 23 September – Colin Barnett is sworn in as Premier of Western Australia.
- 30 September – Professor Ross Garnaut releases his final report in the Garnaut Climate Change Review.

=== October ===
- 10 October – Prime Minister Kevin Rudd receives a phone call from U.S. President George W. Bush during a dinner party at The Lodge. A subsequent edition of The Australian newspaper reports that during the call, President Bush asked Rudd what the G-20 was. Although the White House and the Prime Minister deny this exchange took place, the Opposition uses the event to question Mr Rudd's discretion.
- 18 October – A general election is held in the Australian Capital Territory.
- 20 October – Qantas commercially flies the Airbus A380 for the first time.

=== November ===
- 16 November – The Gap, Queensland and surrounding areas are affected by severe thunderstorms with Microburst.

=== December ===
- 15 December – Prime Minister Kevin Rudd announces that Australia will cut its greenhouse gas emissions by five per cent of 2000 levels by the year 2020, with an option to reduce by 15 per cent if other developing countries take similar action. The announcement is criticised by the Australian Greens and environmental groups as not going far enough.

== Arts and literature ==
- 7 March – Del Kathryn Barton wins the 2008 Archibald Prize for You are what is most beautiful about me, a self portrait with Kell and Arella, a self-portrait with her children.
- 13 March – Australian author Sonya Hartnett wins the 2008 Astrid Lindgren Memorial Award for young adult literature.
- 23 May – New South Wales Police seize a number of photographs depicting naked children by artist Bill Henson which were to be exhibited the previous day.
- 19 June – Steven Carroll's novel The Time We Have Taken wins the Miles Franklin Award
- 12 September – Steven Conte's novel The Zookeeper's War wins the Prime Minister's Literary Award for Fiction, and Ochre and Rust: Artefacts and Encounters on Australian Frontiers by Philip Jones wins the Non-Fiction award.
- 19 September – First-time novelist Andrew Croome wins the Vogel Literary Award for his manuscript about the Petrov affair, Document Z.
- 15 October – Indian-Australian journalist Aravind Adiga wins the 2008 Man Booker Prize for his debut novel, The White Tiger.

=== Arts and literature award winners ===
- Michelle de Kretser is awarded the Australian Literature Society Gold Medal for The Lost Dog.
- Michelle de Kretser's novel The Lost Dog wins the Christina Stead Prize for fiction.
- Helen Garner's novel The Spare Room wins the Vance Palmer Prize for Fiction.

== Science and technology ==
- 5 August – Google Street View images of Australian city streets are added to Google Maps and Google Earth software.

== Film ==
- 26 February – Melbourne-born film producer Eva Orner wins an Academy Award for Documentary Feature for the film Taxi to the Dark Side.
- 26 November – Baz Luhrmann's epic film Australia, starring Nicole Kidman and Hugh Jackman, makes its debut.

== Television ==
- 5 January – Fox Sports commentator, Clinton Grybas, dies at 32 as a result of falling whilst sleepwalking.
- 14 January – Nine Network revamps its logo and on-air graphics as a part of a new network re-launch, and after a two-year absence, returns the famous "Nine Balls" logo, except instead of balls, they use discs.
- 7 February – Veteran television presenter Ray Martin quits the Nine Network after 30 years with the network.
- 8 February – At 12:00 PM AEDT ABC TV officially became ABC1.
- 8 February – Former The Great Outdoors host Shelley Craft quits Channel Seven and moves to Channel Nine to take over from Toni Pearen as host of Australia's Funniest Home Videos.
- 12 February – The Supreme Court of Victoria places an injunction on the broadcast and exhibition of the Nine Network's drama series Underbelly in Victoria, following concerns that the series, which depicts Melbourne's gangland wars, could prejudice an ongoing murder trial.
- 14 March – A Current Affair broadcasts its 5000th episode and celebrates its 20th anniversary.
- 17 March – The Nine Network launches its high-definition television channel, Nine HD.
- 3 April – Kate Ritchie (Sally Fletcher), one of the original cast members of Home and Away, leaves the series after 20 years.
- 7 April – The Nine Network makes the first episodes of the new series Canal Road available for download over the Internet, ahead of its television broadcast on 16 April.
- 27 April – Jack Chambers wins the first series of So You Think You Can Dance Australia.
- 4 May – The 2008 Logie Awards are held. Kate Ritchie (formerly of Home and Away) wins the Gold Logie for the second year in a row.
- 7 May – SBS TV reveals its new logo.
- 26 May – Game show Million Dollar Wheel of Fortune, a revival of the Wheel of Fortune format, premieres on the Nine Network.
- 2 June – The Seven Network apologises after airing an episode of the hospital drama All Saints in which it is suggested that a child born of an incestuous relationship is likely to result in the child having Down's syndrome.
- 27 June – Million Dollar Wheel of Fortune is cancelled on the Nine Network after a month.
- 7 July – Seven Network starts broadcasting its watermark on all news and current affairs programs.
- 21 July – The final episode of Big Brother Australia, which was axed by Network Ten the week prior, goes to air. The winner of the final series is 52-year-old grandmother Terri Munro.
- 25 July – The Nine Network's Nightline news program is broadcast for the last time after 16 years on air.
- 26 July – Peter Cundall's last appearance on ABC1's Gardening Australia before retiring from Australian Landscapes.
- 28 July – TV journalist, This Is Your Life host and also a former host of A Current Affair, Mike Munro announces he is leaving the Nine Network after 22 years, due to budget cuts.
- 3 August – The Nine Network's Sunday program is broadcast for the last time after 27 years on air.
- 28 August – Australia's Naughtiest Home Videos, an adult-oriented spin-off of Australia's Funniest Home Videos is revived on the Nine Network. The program made headlines in 1992 when then-CEO Kerry Packer ordered it to be taken off-air in the middle of one episode.

== Sport ==
- 6 January – Australia retains the Border–Gavaskar Trophy when it beats India by 122 runs at the Sydney Cricket Ground, equalling its own record of 16 consecutive Test cricket victories.
- 7 January – The Board of Control for Cricket in India (BCCI) suspends India's cricket tour of Australia after objecting to a three-match ban on Harbhajan Singh for allegedly calling Australian player Andrew Symonds a "big monkey". The tour suspension is lifted on 9 January after umpire Steve Bucknor is removed from the third test.
- 20 January – Central Coast Mariners FC claim the premiership for the A-League 2007–08 season.
- 14 to 27 January – The 2008 Australian Open Tennis Championships are held at Melbourne Park. Serbian Novak Djokovic wins the men's singles, the first Grand Slam title since the 2005 Australian Open not won by Roger Federer or Rafael Nadal. He is also the youngest player to win the Australian Open, and the first Serb. Russian Maria Sharapova wins the women's singles title.
- 6 February – Australia defeats Qatar 3–0 in a 2010 FIFA World Cup qualification match at Telstra Dome in Melbourne.
- 24 February – Newcastle United Jets FC defeat Central Coast Mariners FC 1–0 in the A-League Grand Final 2008, becoming champions of the 2007–08 season.
- 29 February – 2007 NRL premiers the Melbourne Storm are defeated by Super League XII champions the Leeds Rhinos 11–4 in the 2008 World Club Challenge.
- 2 March – Australian rider Troy Bayliss wins both races at the Australian Superbike World Championship round.
- 12 March – The Football Federation Australia postpones the expansion of the A-League to include new clubs Gold Coast Galaxy FC and North Queensland Thunder FC until at least the 2009–10 season.
- 16 March – British driver Lewis Hamilton wins the 2008 Australian Grand Prix.
- 22 March – Swimmer Stephanie Rice breaks the 400 metres medley world record.
- 25 March – Stephanie Rice breaks the 200 metres medley world record.
- 26 March – Australia draws with China 0–0 in a 2010 FIFA World Cup qualification match at Tuodong Stadium in Kunming, China.
- 1 June – Australia defeats Iraq 1–0 in a 2010 FIFA World Cup qualification match at Suncorp Stadium in Brisbane, Queensland.
- 2 July – Queensland defeats New South Wales by 16–10 in the third game of the 2008 Rugby League State of Origin series, thereby winning their third consecutive series by two games to one.
- 8 to 24 August – Australia competes in the 2008 Summer Olympics in Beijing, China. The Australian Olympic team wins 14 gold medals, coming 6th on the medal tally.
- 7 September – The Melbourne Storm win their third straight minor premiership following the final main round of the 2008 NRL season. Like the previous two years, the win would later be revoked in 2010 following the club's salary cap breach. The Canterbury Bulldogs finish in last position, claiming the wooden spoon.
- 13 September – The New Zealand All Blacks win the 2008 Tri Nations Series in rugby union.
- 22 September – The Western Bulldogs' Adam Cooney wins the 2008 Brownlow Medal for best and fairest player in the Australian Football League.
- 27 September – Hawthorn become premiers of the 2008 AFL season, defeating Geelong 18.7 (115) to 11.23 (89) in the 2008 AFL Grand Final.
- 5 October – The Manly-Warringah Sea Eagles become premiers of the National Rugby League season 2008, defeating minor premiers the Melbourne Storm 40–0 at ANZ Stadium.
- 5 October – Australian Ducati Corse rider Casey Stoner wins his second successive Australian motorcycle Grand Prix. Stoner wins by 6.5 seconds over Yamaha Motor Racing rider Valentino Rossi.
- 12 October – Craig Lowndes and Jamie Whincup win their third successive Bathurst 1000 at the 2008 Supercheap Auto Bathurst 1000.
- 25 October – Maldivian wins the Cox Plate at Moonee Valley, defeating Zipping and Samantha Miss.
- 25 October to 22 November – The 2008 Rugby League World Cup is held in Australia. New Zealand wins the cup, defeating Australia 34 – 20 at the Suncorp Stadium in Brisbane.
- 26 October – Ryan Briscoe takes his Team Penske run Dallara IR5 to victory in the 2008 Nikon Indy 300, becoming in the last running of the event, the first Australian driver to win the Gold Coast Indycar race.
- 4 November – Viewed wins the 2008 Melbourne Cup, the twelfth win of the race for trainer Bart Cummings.
- 28 December – The yacht Wild Oats XI claims its fourth consecutive line honours win in the Sydney to Hobart Yacht Race. Quest is the race's handicap winner.

== Births ==
- 10 January – Quinn MacNicol, footballer
- 16 January – Logan Sambrook, footballer
- 18 January – Feyzo Kasumovic, footballer
- 23 January – Christian Pullella, footballer
- 2 February – Nickolas Alfaro, footballer
- 16 February – Zane Stevenson, footballer
- 22 February – Alexander Garbowski, footballer
- 27 February – Haine Eames, footballer
- 3 March – Anthony Didulica, footballer
- 30 March – Kade Baccus, footballer
- 6 April – Rhys Williams, footballer
- 14 April – Isiah Boston, footballer
- 28 April – Jay Maltz, footballer
- 30 April – Max Anastasio, footballer
- 12 May – Alex Bolton, footballer
- 20 May – Thomas Cutuk, footballer
- 1 July – Amlani Tatu, footballer
- 3 August – Archie Trimboli, footballer
- 8 August – Beckham Baker, footballer
- 12 August – Charlie Parkin, footballer
- 14 August – Jared Williams, footballer
- 30 August – Eizar Tanjung, Indonesian footballer
- 31 August – Jai Ajanovic, footballer

== Deaths ==
- 1 January – Ted Baldwin, 85, politician
- 5 January – Clinton Grybas, 32, sports commentator
- 8 January – George T. D. Moore, 84, former jockey and horse trainer
- 9 January – Tim Willoughby, 53, Olympic rower
- 11 January – Nancy Phelan, 94, writer
- 12 January – Isobel Bennett, 98, marine biologist
- 19 January – Creighton Burns, 82, editor of The Age newspaper (1981–1989)
- 22 January – Heath Ledger, 28, actor (died in New York City)
- 25 January – Roc Kirby, 89, founder of Village Roadshow Limited
- 26 January – Padraic McGuinness, 69, journalist
- 3 February – Jackie Orszaczky, 59, Hungarian-born musician and record producer
- 14 February – Smoky Dawson, 94, country music performer
- 19 February – Peter Pianto, 78, VFL player and coach for Geelong
- 21 February – Geoff Leek, 76, VFL player for Essendon
- 25 February – Ashley Cooper, 27, V8 Supercar race driver
- 28 February – Val Plumwood, 67, ecologist and feminist
- 1 March – Sid Spindler, 76, Democrats senator
- 3 March – Norm O'Neill, 71, cricketer
- 14 March – Clyde Cameron, 95, Whitlam government minister
- 16 March – Bill Brown, 95, cricketer and member of the 1948 Invincibles
- 19 March – John Dowie, 93, sculptor
- 1 April – Audrey Cahn, 102, nutritionist
- 6 April – Tony Davies, 68, New Zealand rugby union player
- 7 April – Sir Frank Little, 82, Roman Catholic Archbishop of Melbourne
- 8 April – John Button, 74, ALP senator and Hawke government minister
- 10 April – Kim Santow, 67, NSW Supreme Court judge, university chancellor
- 24 April – Tristram Cary, 82, British composer
- 30 April – John Cargher, 89, ABC Radio presenter
- 9 May – Jack Gibson, 79, rugby league coach and player
- 10 May – Jessie Jacobs, 17, actress (The Saddle Club)
- 22 May – Charlie Booth, 104, athlete and inventor of the starting block
- 26 May – Alan Renouf, 89, head of DFAT and ambassador
- 27 May – Mick Nolan, 58, Australian rules footballer.
- 3 June – Trevor Kaine, 80, Chief Minister of the Australian Capital Territory (1989–1991)
- 11 June – Sir Francis Hassett, 90, soldier and head of the Australian Defence Force
- 22 June – Jane McGrath, 42, cancer support campaigner and wife of cricketer Glenn McGrath
- 25 June – Lyall Watson, 69, South African botanist and author
- 6 July – Jack Collins, 78, Australian rules footballer (Footscray)
- 7 July – Yitzchok Dovid Groner, 83, chief rabbi of Melbourne's Chabad-Lubavitch community
- 12 July – Olive Riley, 108, believed to have been the world's oldest blogger
- 13 July – Peter Durack, 81, Liberal Party senator and Fraser government minister
- 16 July – Lindsay Thompson, 84, Premier of Victoria (1981–1982)
- 18 July – Peter Welsh, 54, Australian rules footballer
- 25 July – Jeff Fehring, 52, Australian rules footballer
- 5 August – Reg Lindsay, 79, country music singer
- 12 August – Christie Allen, 53, pop music singer
- 27 August – Alec Hill, 92, military historian
- 28 August – Mark Priestley, 32, television actor (All Saints)
- 1 September – Michael Pate, 88, actor and writer
- 1 September – Kevin Heinze, 81, ABC television and radio presenter
- 4 September – Colin Egar, 80, cricket umpire and administrator
- 12 September – Bob Quinn, 88, SANFL footballer
- 23 September – Peter Leonard, 66, journalist and television presenter
- 24 September – Sir Peter Derham, 83, businessman and philanthropist
- 25 September – Roger Vanderfield, 80, rugby union referee and administrator
- 2 October – Rob Guest, 58, stage actor and singer
- 4 October – Levi Kereama, 27, R&B Singer
- 27 November – Paul Hibbert, 56, cricketer
- 2 December – Frank Crean, 92, Deputy Prime Minister and Treasurer in the Whitlam government
- 6 December – Richard Marsland, 32, actor, comedian and radio announcer
- 8 December – Kerryn McCann, 41, athlete
- 10 December – Dorothy Porter, 54, poet
- 29 December – William Ellis Green, 85, cartoonist

== See also ==
- 2008 in Australian literature
- 2008 in Australian television
- List of Australian films of 2008
