= Victor Smith =

Sir Victor Smith
- Born: 9 May 1913; Chatswood, New South Wales
- Died: 10 July 1998 (aged 85); Canberra, Australian Capital Territory
- Relatives: Victor Trumper (uncle)
- Military career
- Allegiance: Australia
- Branch: Royal Australian Navy
- Service years: 1927–1975
- Rank: Admiral
- Commands: Chairman, Chiefs of Staff Committee (1970–75); Chief of Naval Staff (1968–70); Deputy Chief of Naval Staff (1967–68); HM Australian Fleet (1966–67); HMAS Melbourne (1961–62); HMAS Albatross (1957–58); HMAS Queenborough (1956–57); HMAS Quadrant (1955–56)
- Conflicts: Second World War; Battle of Savo Island; Battle of Guadalcanal; Battle of the Atlantic; Invasion of Normandy; Korean War; Vietnam War
- Awards: Companion of the Order of Australia; Knight Commander of the Order of the British Empire; Companion of the Order of the Bath; Distinguished Service Cross; Mentioned in Despatches

Admiral Sir Victor Alfred Trumper Smith, AC, KBE, CB, DSC (9 May 1913 – 10 July 1998) was a senior officer in the Royal Australian Navy. Smith's career culminated with his appointment as chairman, Chiefs of Staff Committee—forerunner of the role of Australia's Chief of the Defence Force—from 1970 to 1975, following an earlier term as Chief of Naval Staff from 1968 to 1970.

== Early life ==
Smith was born in Chatswood, New South Wales on 9 May 1913, to George and Una Smith, and was named after his uncle, Victor Trumper, a distinguished Australian cricketer. He was educated at Chatswood Public School, where he participated in such sports as swimming, tennis and rugby and was also a member of the Chatswood Wolf Cub Pack.

== Early career ==
After deciding to embark on a naval career, Smith entered the Royal Australian Naval College as a cadet midshipman in January 1927. He attended the college for three-and-a-half years before receiving a further six months of training at Flinders Naval Depot. In January 1931, Smith was then posted to HMAS Canberra, and in May was promoted to midshipman. In July the following year, he was posted to HMS London for service with the Mediterranean Fleet. Promoted to acting sub-lieutenant, Smith was sent to England where he assumed a number of courses until October 1934, when he returned to HMAS Canberra. He served with the ship until March 1936, when he was promoted to lieutenant and posted to HMAS Australia.

After deciding to specialise in naval aviation, Smith proceeded to England to attend a Naval Observers Course in March 1937. Upon graduation, he was posted to No. 825 Squadron aboard HMS Glorious in the Mediterranean. He remained on the ship until August 1939, when he left for England to attend a Meteorological Course. However, due to the outbreak of war, the course was abandoned and Smith was appointed to the new carrier HMS Ark Royal.

== Second World War ==
In 1940, Smith took part in operations off Norway with Ark Royal, before receiving a posting to No. 821 Squadron based at RNAS Hatston. On 21 June, he led six Swordfish biplanes in carrying out the first-ever torpedo attack by aircraft on a capital ship at sea. The raid was conducted against the German battleship Scharnhorst off the Norwegian coast while subject to heavy anti-aircraft fire. The Scharnhorst suffered no hits by the torpedoes, but only four aircraft managed to return safely to land. For his actions during the attack, Smith received a Mention in Despatches.

In August, Smith was sent to join No. 807 Fighter Squadron aboard HMS Pegasus. The ship was used to protect convoys in the Western Approaches against the German Condor aircraft. In February 1941, the squadron joined HMS Furious, and was tasked with the protection of shipping off the African coast. In April, the squadron joined Ark Royal, where Smith served until the ship was sunk off Gibraltar on 30 November by U-81. During this time, Smith had been shot down twice, each time managing to be picked up by a destroyer. In the New Years Honours of 1942, Smith was awarded the Distinguished Service Cross for "out-standing zeal, patience and cheerfulness and for setting an example of wholeheartedness devotion to duty".

After the sinking of the Ark Royal, Smith returned to Australia where he was appointed as liaison officer to the United States Navy heavy cruiser USS Chicago. He served in this position until May, when he was appointed to HMAS Canberra as the observer for aircraft. Smith served aboard the cruiser until it was sunk in the Battle of Savo Island during the Guadalcanal landings on 9 August 1942. Returning to Australia once more, he was appointed to the Amphibious Training School, HMAS Assault, for a short period prior to being appointed to stand by HMAS Shropshire. Promoted to acting lieutenant commander in March 1943, in July Smith was appointed Air Staff Officer to HMS Tracker, an American built escort carrier which was operating in the Battle of the Atlantic and escorting Russian convoys. During this time, the aircraft aboard Tracker managed to assist in the sinking of two German U-boats and shoot down six German long-range planes.

Promoted to lieutenant commander in 1944, Smith was posted as the Air Planning Officer on the staff of the Flag Officer, British Assault Area for the Normandy invasion. He was next appointed Air Planning Officer on the staff of the Vice Admiral (Q), British Pacific Fleet, retaining this position until 1 October 1945.

== Post-war career ==
The Naval Board now decided to send Smith to the Admiralty in London, to obtain information that would assist in the planning and formation of a Fleet Air Arm (FAA) in the Royal Australian Navy. He returned to Australia in January 1947, as a member of the Australian Naval Aviation Planning Staff. Government approval for the formation of the FAA was given in July, and Smith was promoted to commander in December. The FAA was officially established on 28 August 1948, and Smith has become widely known as the "Father of the Fleet Air Arm."

Smith was appointed Executive Officer of HMAS Sydney in January 1950, and served on the ship during its six-month tour of duty in the Korean War between August 1951, and February 1952. During this time, the Fleet Air Arm was conducting operations over Korea from Sydney; the first time it was in action. In April 1952, Smith was appointed to command the Advance Party at the former Royal Australian Air Force Air Station at Schofields. When Schofields was commissioned as HMAS Nirimba in April 1953, Smith was appointed Chief Staff Officer to the Captain (Air) Australia. He left this position in July to become Director of Air Warfare Organisation and Training at Navy Office, Melbourne and was promoted to captain in the New Year.

In June 1955, he was appointed Captain of the 1st Frigate Squadron in command of HMAS Quadrant, prior to assuming command of HMAS Queenborough the following year. In January 1957, Smith was appointed to command HMAS Albatross, the naval air station at Nowra, New South Wales. He served in this position until November 1959, when he was selected to attend the Imperial Defence College, London.

After a year in London, Smith returned to Australia to take command of the carrier HMAS Melbourne in January 1961. After eighteen months in command of the flagship, he was promoted to acting rear admiral in 1962. The rank was made permanent in 1963, and Smith served as Second Naval Member at the Navy Office. In the Queen's Birthday Honours of the same year, he was awarded a Commander of the Order of the British Empire.

Smith's next appointment was as Fourth Naval Member, which lasted twelve months. In February 1966, he was appointed as Flag Officer Commanding HM Australian Fleet prior to assuming the office of Deputy Chief of Naval Staff. Promoted to vice admiral in April 1968, Smith was appointed Chief of Naval Staff, and in June was awarded a Companion of the Order of the Bath. The following year, Smith was knighted as a Knight Commander of the Order of the British Empire.

In November 1970, Smith was appointed Chairman, Chiefs of Staff Committee and promoted to the rank of admiral, becoming the first Australian to achieve that rank. In mid 1975 he was awarded the newly established Companion of the Order of Australia, before retiring in November; just short of forty-nine years naval service.

== Later life ==
Smith was active in his retirement, serving in various posts such as President of the ACT/Queanbeyan Division of Birthright, an Australia-wide organisation which assists single parents with dependent children, and as patron of the ACT Rugby League. Smith died on 10 July 1998, at the age of 85.

Military offices
| Preceded by General Sir John Wilton | Chairman, Chiefs of Staff Committee; 1970–1975 | Succeeded by General Sir Frank Hassett |
| Preceded by Vice Admiral Sir Alan McNicoll | Chief of Naval Staff; 1968–1970 | Succeeded by Vice Admiral Sir Richard Peek |
| Preceded by Rear Admiral Richard Peek | Deputy Chief of Naval Staff; 1967–1968 | Succeeded by Rear Admiral David Stevenson |
| Preceded by Rear Admiral Thomas Morrison | Flag Officer Commanding HM Australian Fleet; 1966–1967 | Succeeded by Rear Admiral Richard Peek |
