= List of Australian films of 2008 =

== List ==
Title	Director	Cast	Genre	Notes
1 and 0 nly	Martyn Park	Christopher Baker	Mystery, science fiction	
$9.99	Tatia Rosenthal	Geoffrey Rush, Joel Edgerton, Samuel Johnson	Animation	
Acolytes	Jon Hewitt	Joel Edgerton, Belinda McClory	Thriller	
Actingclassof1977.com	Sally McKenzie	Mel Gibson, Steve Bisley, Annie Byron, Sally McKenzie	Documentary	
Australia	Baz Luhrmann	Hugh Jackman, Nicole Kidman	Adventure, romantic drama	
Bitter & Twisted	Christopher Weekes	Noni Hazlehurst, Steve Rodgers	Drama	
The Black Balloon	Elissa Down	Rhys Wakefield, Luke Ford, Toni Collette	Drama	AACTA Award for Best Film
Broken Sun	Brad Haynes	Jai Koutrae, Shingo Usami	War	
The Burning Season	Cathy Henkel	Lone Drøscher Nielsen, Dorjee Sun	Documentary	
Cactus	Jasmine Yuen Carrucan	Travis McMahon, David Lyons, Bryan Brown	Drama	
Crooked Business	Chris Nyst	Teo Gebert, Firass Dirani, Brad McMurray	Comedy	
Dying Breed	Jody Dywer	Nathan Phillips, Leigh Whannell, Mirrah Foulkes	Horror	
Gentle Persuasion	Burleigh Smith	Burleigh Smith, Sarah Louella	Comedy, drama	
Good Luck with That	Igor Smiljevic	Igor Smiljevic, Louise Smiljevic	Action	
Hey, Hey, It's Esther Blueburger	Cathy Randall	Danielle Catanzariti, Keisha Castle-Hughes	Comedy drama	
Hodads	Brett Nichols	David Field, Tony Martin	Comedy	
The Horseman	Steven Kastrissios	Peter Marshall, Caroline Marohasy	Thriller	
I Know How Many Runs You Scored Last Summer	Stacey Edmonds, Doug Turner	Jai Koutrae	Comedy, horror	
Katusha	Igor Grabovsky	Peter Haleluka, Sarah Chalmers, Suzanne Gullabovska	War	
Lake Mungo	Joel Anderson	Talia Zucker	Pseudo-documentary, psychological horror	
The Life o'Simon	Rupert Owen, Travis Sutherland		Thriller	
Lionel	Eddie Martin	Lionel Rose	Documentary	
Men's Group	Michael Joy	Grant Dodwell, Don Reid	Drama	
Monkey Puzzle	Mark Forstmann	Ben Geurens, Ryan Johnson	Drama	
Newcastle	Dan Castle	Ben Geurens, Ryan Johnson	Drama	
Nim's Island	Jennifer Flackett	Abigail Breslin, Jodie Foster, Gerard Butler	Adventure	
No Through Road	Sam Barrett	James Helm, Megan Palinkas	Thriller	
Not Quite Hollywood: The Wild, Untold Story of Ozploitation!	Mark Hartley	Quentin Tarantino, Dennis Hopper	Documentary	
Offing David	Jeff Bays		Comedy, mystery	
The Plex	Tim Boyle	Matt Doran, Jason Crewes	Comedy	
Punishment	Danny Matier	Nicholas Bishop, Roxane Wilson	Thriller	
Rats and Cats	Tony Rogers	Jason Gann, Adam Zwar	Comedy drama	
The Ruins	Carter Smith	Jonathan Tucker, Jena Malone, Shawn Ashmore, Laura Ramsey, Joe Anderson	Natural horror	
Salute	Matt Norman	Peter Norman, Tommie Smith	Documentary	
Son of a Lion	Benjamin Gilmour	Sher Alam Miskeen Ustad, Niaz Shinwari	Drama	
The Square	Nash Edgerton	David Roberts, Claire van der Boom	Thriller	
Ten Empty	Anthony Hayes	Daniel Frederiksen, Geoff Morrell	Drama	
The Tender Hook	Jonathan Ogilvie	Rose Byrne, Hugo Weaving	Drama	
Three Blind Mice	Matthew Newton	Matthew Newton, Ewen Leslie, Toby Schmitz	Comedy	
Unfinished Sky	Peter Duncan	William McInnes, Monic Hendrickx	Drama	
The View from Greenhaven	Kenn and Simon MacRae	Wendy Hughes, Chris Haywood	Drama	
WhaleDreamers	Kim Kindersly	Jack Thompson, Julian Lennon	Documentary	
Whatever Happened To Brenda Hean?	Scott Millwood		Documentary	

== See also ==
- 2008 in Australia
- 2008 in Australian television
- List of 2008 box office number-one films in Australia
