= It's Academic (Australian game show) =

- Genre: Game show
- Presented by: Local Hosts: Dan Webb (HSV-7); Andrew Harwood (ATN-7 & HSV-7); Sandy Roberts; Alec McAskill (ADS-7); Jeff Newman (TVW-7); Revived Version; Simon Reeve (2005–2016)
- Starring: Revived Version: Lizzy Lovette (2005–2006); Sally Stanton (2007–2016)
- Country of origin: Australia
- Original language: English
- No. of series: 20
- No. of episodes: 1,300

Production
- Production locations: Various (1968–1980); Perth, Western Australia (2001–2004); Sydney, New South Wales (2005–2016)
- Running time: 30 minutes (including commercials)

Original release
- Network: Network Ten (1968–1969); Seven Network (1970–1980, 2001–2004 Perth only, 2005–2012); 7two (2013–2016)
- Release: 1968 – 1980
- Release: 2001 – 2004
- Release: 17 October 2005 – 22 January 2016

Related
- It's Academic

It's Academic is an Australian children's game show which is based on the long-running American version of It's Academic, and pits students from different schools against each other in a test of knowledge covering a number of diverse subjects including English, mathematics, science, geography, sport, music and popular culture. The show originally aired on Network Ten and the Seven Network from 1968 to 1978. It was revived locally in 2001, leading to a national relaunch in 2005, and later aired its final version on 7two.

== History ==
The show originally aired on Network Ten from 1968 and 1969 being hosted by John Bailey and then on the Seven Network from 1970 to 1980. In the years 2001 to 2004, Seven Perth revived the show, where it was broadcast locally, leading to a national relaunch on 17 October 2005. The last version on 7two featured schoolchildren in Grade 6, aged around 11 to 12 years old.

The early incarnation of It's Academic was the basis for a series of sketches from The Late Show in which Santo Cilauro, Rob Sitch and Tom Gleisner, who all claimed to have gone to the same school, competed on the program with incredible but humorous incompetence. Coincidentally, their sometime collaborator actor/comedian Magda Szubanski had actually captained a team as a Year 10 student at Siena College in Melbourne, in 1976.

Hosts in the 1970s included Danny Webb (HSV-7), Trevor Sutton (Television Host) BTQ-7 Andrew Harwood (ATN-7 and HSV-7), Sandy Roberts (ADS-7), Alec McAskill (ADS-7), Jeff Newman (TVW-7) and John Bailey. In recent years, Jeff Newman once again hosted Perth's version of It's Academic while Simon Reeve fronts the national version.

== Format ==
=== Original format ===
The 1960s–70s version of It's Academic was conducted on a per-state basis, with episodes featuring on-air contestants in teams of three, with an official fourth as a reserve, each from one of three different high schools from that state. Contestants were aged around 15 or 16 years, in Year Ten at High School. Winning teams would progress through to state semifinals and finals. In many years, state champion teams met in a national grand finals. Shows were recorded with large live audiences on Saturdays with school staff representatives supervising the contest.

In early rounds, team captains would 'pick a packet' (a numbered pack of ten questions) from a board of numbered options. Teams could answer these questions with no penalties for incorrect answers, but each round was time-limited, and teams could pass on difficult questions to attempt remaining questions before returning to passed questions. All team members could respond to questions; in cases where two answers were given at the same time, the host would ask the captain to confirm the team's response. A 'beat the buzzer' segment and later a video-clip round completed the contest. In 'beat the buzzer', penalties applied for incorrectly answered questions. In cases of ties, captains would pick tie-breaker packets for their team to answer.

State contestants usually received Sheaffer or Parker pen sets as mementos, with additional prizes (often dictionaries or encyclopedias) awarded to the winning school. In the original series, cash prizes of A$500 ($2,732 to $6,505 in 2022 terms) to each team member were awarded to the state team final winners. National prizes differed but were of a similar financial value. In 1971, the national championship team was flown to Los Angeles and toured Hollywood.

The pilot and first two years of the Australian series were recorded by Network Ten, on Saturdays, at the North Ryde TEN-10 studios in Sydney NSW and also in Victoria. The first two NSW seasons 1968 and 1969 were hosted by John Bailey, and both series finals were won by Marist Brothers, Eastwood. The show moved to the Seven Network in 1970 and was recorded at the ATN 7 Mobbs Lane studios at Epping, New South Wales, with a new host, Andrew Harwood. Marist Brothers Eastwood again made it to the 1970 series final but were defeated on that occasion.

In 1970, an "Its Academic Challenge" series, being an interstate contest involving all of the three teams from each state that competed in that state's championship round, was also recorded. In 1971, a team from Inala State High School in Queensland won the It's Academic Challenge final.

=== Revived format ===
The 2008 version features six new schools every week, with the winning schools to reappear later in the season for semifinals and grand finals. Each individual episode features five teams (green, red, blue, yellow and purple), each made up of six members from each school. There is a new feature called the Clean Sweep; it only occurs when a team answers all questions correctly in the first round. A correct answer following the Clean Sweep will award the team with 20 points.

The question rounds consist of a series of five, aimed at one team only. Players are given five seconds to answer, or longer for a spelling question, and may confer amongst themselves before giving an answer. As in the original series, if two students answer differently at once, the team captain is asked to select one answer.

The Random Spotlight selects a member of the team at random. They are then asked a question about their chosen topic, which can be absolutely anything, ranging from academic subjects such as spelling or history, to more specific topics such as capital cities or outer space, to pop culture–themed topics.

Unlike the question rounds, Beat the Buzzer is open for all teams to answer. Simon Reeve reads out questions to all contestants, who buzz in to answer. This is the most competitive segment of the show, as teams attempt to buzz in before other teams in order to score points (10 per correct question; 10 per incorrect answer). Beat the Buzzer is a speed round lasting for 45 seconds. If the team answers a question after time is up, the team would not gain or lose 10 points regardless if it's right or wrong.

The information segment was introduced in Season 2. It consists of Lizzy Lovette and later Sally Stanton giving a brief report on a particular topic. Teams are asked a 10-point buzz-in question on the topic to make sure they were listening. Initially the team who correctly answered the question also won the right to be the first team to get their question round, but this was later dropped. No points are lost if a team answers the question incorrectly, but they would be locked out in the next question. Should this happen, another question would be asked by Reeve for the remaining teams.

In Watch This Space, contestants are shown a one-minute video clip on a certain subject, about which they are then asked three to five questions. All teams compete on the buzzer for the right to answer the questions: 10 points for a correct answer, 10 points off for a wrong answer. In later seasons, after each question, a screenshot from the video clip is shown to the audience that answers the question.

In Unscramble this Picture Puzzle, a 3-by-3 or a 4-by-4 sliding puzzle is shown on the screens; later, it became a 5-by-5 sliding puzzle. The puzzle can be a person, a place or an object. When a team buzzes in, the puzzle freezes. The first team to identify the puzzle gets 10 points for their team and the puzzle is instantly revealed to the audience. If they get it wrong, no points are deducted; however, they get locked out, allowing the other teams to answer it. If all three teams fail to identify the puzzle (scrambled or not), no points are given out and the answer is revealed.

The team who answers the Unscramble this Picture Puzzle question on the buzzer has the right to choose one of three topics for Fact or Fiction, a new round in 2006, and get five seconds to make that decision. Reeve then reads five statements about the topic for which schools buzz in to answer. These questions are simply true-or-false questions.

=== Scoring ===
- Each team begins with 100 points. (When the show first returned in 2005, it was impossible to lose points at any time during the show; this made these 100 points rather useless.)
- In the individual team question rounds, 10 points are awarded for a correct answer; no points are deducted for a wrong answer.
- If a contestant correctly answers his or her Random Spotlight question, 20 points are awarded instead of 10; once again, no points are deducted for a wrong answer.
- In any buzzer rounds, 10 points are awarded for a correct answer, and 10 points are deducted for a wrong answer. When the show was introduced in 2005, no penalties were given for incorrect answers.

The school with the most aggregate points at the end of the week is the winner, progressing to the semifinals and then the grand final. The winning school on any one day does not compete for more points or prizes, and should there be a tie it need not be broken. However, should there be a tie after the week, a tie-breaker would be given out for the Friday's teams. The team that gives the correct answer gets 10 points for their team and goes through to the next round. An incorrect answer would lose them 10 points, and the opposing team goes through instead.

== Episodes ==
The following is an incomplete list of episodes broadcast, participating schools and winning schools from the show. At the end of each season, winning schools from prior episodes are invited back to play in the finals.

=== Season 1 (2005–06) ===
Episode	First Place	Second Place	Third Place
Heat 1 17–21 October 2005	Sadleir; 1990	Our Lady Queen of Peace; 1010	St. Michael's; 840
Heat 2 24–28 October 2005	Holy Spirit; 1630	Birchgrove; 1530	Seven Hills; 1190
Heat 3 31 October–4 November 2005			
Heat 4 7–11 November 2005	Denistone East; 1520	Bert Oldfield Public; 1470	Telopea; 1260
Heat 5 14–18 November 2005	Carlingford unknown	St. Therese Primary unknown	Epping North unknown
Heat 6 21–25 November 2005	St. Ambrose; 1500	Dundas; 1460	Maronite College of the Holy Family; 1440
Heat 7 28 November–2 December 2005			
Heat 8 5–9 December 2005			
Heat 9 12–16 December 2005			
Semi-Final 1 19–23 December 2005	Castle Hill; 1st Place	St. Gerard's unknown	St. Mark's unknown
Semi-Final 2 26–30 December 2005	Denistone East; 1600	St. Ambrose; 1520	Carlingford; 1410
Semi-Final 3 2–6 January 2006	Sadleir; 1760	Balmain; 1190	OLH; 980
Grand Final 9–13 January 2006	Castle Hill; 1870	Sadleir; 1210	Denistone East; 890

=== Season 2 (2006) ===
Episode	First Place	Second Place	Third Place
Heat 1 27–31 March	Matthew Pearce; 1480	St. Madeleine's; 1410	Castle Cove; 1160
Heat 2 3–7 April	Chatswood Public School; 1460	MLC Burwood; 1450	North Ryde; 1360
Heat 3 10–14 April	Quakers Hill East; 1450	Bexley North; 1440	St. Mary's; 1220
Heat 4 17–21 April	Artarmon Public; 1570	Rouse Hill; 1340	Ramsgate Public; 1180
Heat 5 24–28 April	Colyton; 1510	St. Michael's Lane Cove; 1440	Loreta Kirribilli; 1370
Heat 6 1–5 May	Putney; 1490	Blacktown South; 1440	Gordon West; 1400
Heat 7 8–12 May	Knox Grammar; 1490	Forestville; 1390	International; 1350
Heat 8 15–19 May	Dural Public; 1630	Westmead; 1370	St. Martha's; 1340
Heat 9 22–26 May	Mount Colah; 1460	St. Patrick's; 1390	Sacred Heart; 1290
Semi-Final 1 29 May–2 June	Matthew Pearce; 1600	Artarmon Public; 1520	Chatswood Public School; 1300
Semi-Final 2 5–9 June	Knox Grammar; 1630	Colyton Public; 1550	Putney Public; 1340
Semi-Final 3 12–16 June	Dural Public; 1520	Quakers Hill East; 1400	Mount Colah; 1300
Grand Final 19–23 June	Knox Grammar; 1st place	Dural Public; 2nd place	Matthew Pearce Public; 3rd place

=== Season 3 (2006) ===
Episode	First Place	Second Place	Third Place
Heat 1 14–18 August	Truscott Street; 1390	St. Patrick's; 1350	Santa Sabina; 1300
Heat 2 21–25 August			
Heat 3 28 August–1 September			
Heat 4 4–8 September	Redfield; 1330	Lynwood Park; 1300	Taren Point; 1180
Heat 5 11–15 September	*Patrician; 1440	Kings Langley; 1440	Arden; 1330
Heat 6 18–22 September			
Heat 7 25–29 September	St. Therese; 1330	Masada; 1320	St. Peter's; 1220
Heat 8 2–6 October			
Heat 9 9–13 October			
Semi-Final 1 16–20 October			
Semi-Final 2 23–27 October			
Semi-Final 3 30 October–3 November			
Grand Final 6–10 November	Patrician Brothers' College, Fairfield unknown	Good Shepherd	Kellyville Public unknown

=== Season 4 (2007) ===
Episode	First Place	Second Place	Third Place
Heat 1 26 February–2 March	St. Euphemia; 1400	Mowbray Public; 1310	Coogee Boys; 1280
Heat 2 5–9 March	Pennant Hills; 1680	Holsworthy; 1260	Caves Beach; 1240
Heat 3 12–16 March	Star of The Sea; 1420	Castle Hill; 1380	Pacific Hills; 1310
Heat 4 19–23 March	Winston Hills; 1280	Sadleir; 1270	Sule College; 1250
Heat 5 26–30 March	Blakehurst; 1370	Beresford Road; 1360	Warrawee; 1340
Heat 6 2–6 April	Waverley College; 1510	Northern Beaches; 1280	OLR ST Mary; 1270
Heat 7 9–13 April	St. Gertrude's; 1380	Oxford Falls Grammar; 1350	Meriden Junior; 1300
Heat 8 16–20 April	Sacred Heart Mosman; 1290	Parramatta; 1280	Athelstane; 1070
Heat 9 23–27 April	Cranbrook School; 1470	Roseville College; 1430	St. Aloysius Cronulla; 1200
Semi-Final 1 30 April–4 May	St. Euphemia College School; 1300	Winston Hills; 1280	Cranbrook; 1250
Semi-Final 2 7–11 May	Pennant Hills; 1410	Waverley College; 1290	St. Gertrude's; 1240
Semi-Final 3 14–18 May	Our Lady Star of the Sea; 1400	Blakehurst; 1260	Sacred Heart Mosman; 1200
Grand Final 21–25 May	Pennant Hills Public School; 1430	Our Lady Star of the Sea; 1420	St. Euphemia College School; 1180

=== Season 5 (2007) ===
Episode	First Place	Second Place	Third Place
Heat 1 17–21 September	Narellan Public; 1410	Bethel Christian Academy; 1220	Holy Family nelson Irvine contestant Primary; 1210
Heat 2 24–28 September	St. Spyridon College; 1520	St. Mels Primary; 1310	St. Marys; 1280
Heat 3 1–5 October	Al Zahra; 1350	Camden South; 1240	Maitland Public; 1190
Heat 4 8–12 October	Alexandria Park; 1380	O.L.M.C; 1340	Covenant; 1280
Heat 5 15–19 October	SCECGS Redlands; 1440	Ryde East; 1330	Barnier Public; 1270
Heat 6 22–26 October	West Pennant Hills; 1450	Ellison Public; 1240	Al Noori; 1210
Heat 7 29 October–2 November	Kensington; 1490	Berowra; 1400	Eastwood; 1360
Heat 8 5–9 November	Marsden Road; 1430	St Pauls Apostle; 1370	St. Pius X 1360
Heat 9 12–16 November	Strathfield South; 1430	Widemere; 1300	St. Kevins; 1280
Semi-Final 1 19–23 November	West Pennant Hills unknown		
Semi-Final 2 26–30 November	Alexandria Park; 1480	St. Spyridon; 1330	Narellan Public; 1190
Semi-Final 3 3–7 December	Strathfield South; 1430	Kensington; 1270	Marsden Road; 1230
Grand Final 10–14 December	Strathfield South; 1480	West Pennant Hills; 1390	Alexandria Park; 1200

=== Season 6 (2008) ===
Episode	First Place	Second Place	Third Place
Heat 1 3–7 March	Rockdale*; 1330	St. Marks; 1320	Riverview; 1250
Heat 2 10–14 March	St. Joseph's; 1270	Mascot Public; 1150	Ruse Public; 1150
Heat 3 17–21 March	Wattle Grove; 1210	Cambletown East; 1070	Crown Street; 1050
Heat 4 24–28 March	Jannali Public; 1270	Leura Public; 1210	Parklea Public; 1180
Heat 5 31 March–4 April	Hazelbrook Public; 1280	Winston Heights; 1270	Clemton Park; 1230
Heat 6 7–11 April	Sutherland Shire; 1360	Narrabeen Lakes; 1290	Glenmore Road; 1190
Heat 7 14–18 April	Narellan Vale; 1340	Bilgola Plateau; 1250	Penrith Christian; 1140
Heat 8 21–25 April	Burnside; 1290	William Stimson; 1280	AIA; 1130
Heat 9 28 April–2 May	St. Luke's Grammar; 1290	Beaumont Hills; 1230	Maitland Christian; 4080
Semi-Final 1 5–9 May	St. Luke's Grammar unknown		
Semi-Final 2 12–16 May	Jannali Public; 1280	Burnside Public; 1160	Narellan Vale Public; 1140
Semi-Final 3 19–23 May	Hazelbrook Public; 1390	Sutherland Shire; 1360	St. Joseph's; 1330
Grand Final 26–30 May	Hazelbrook Public; 1330	St. Luke's Grammar; 1280	Jannali Public; 1220

=== Season 7 (2008) ===
Episode	First Place	Second Place	Third Place
Heat 1 7–11 July	Woollahra; 1540	Avalon; 1350	Bexley North; 1260
Heat 2 14–18 July	St. Joseph's; 1340	Soldiers Point; 1230	St. Felix; 1220
Heat 3 21–25 July	St. Andrews; 1350	Mater Dai; 1340	Shelly Public; 1260
Heat 4 28 July–1 August	Hunter Christian; 1420	Narrabeen North; 1210	Liverpool Public; 1330
Heat 5 4–8 August	Mona Vale; 1420	CCAS; 1340	Bonnet Bay; 1230
Heat 6 11–15 August	Wentworth Falls; 1360	Loreto Kirribilli; 1340	William Clarke; 1240
Heat 7 18–22 August	Wilkins Public; 1540	Oakhill Drive; 1370	John Warby; 970
Heat 8 25–29 August	Blaxland East; 1280	Double Bay; 1180	Maria Regina; 1170
Heat 9 1–5 September	St. Mary St. Mina; 1440	Maronite College of the Holy Family; 1230	TWPS; 1140
Semi-Final 1 8–12 September	St. Mary St. Mina; 1410	Blaxland; 1400	Mona Vale; 1380
Semi-Final 2 15–19 September	Woollahra; 1460	St. Joseph's; 1420	Hunter Christian; 1320
Semi-Final 3 22–26 September			
Grand Final 29 September–3 October		Woollahra	

=== Season 8 (2009) ===
Episode	First Place	Second Place	Third Place
Heat 1 30 March–3 April	Yagoona Public; 1400	Prouille; 1360	Panania Public; 1190
Heat 2 6–10 April	Georges Hall; 1490	Blaxcell Street; 1460	Ermington West; 1140
Heat 3 13–17 April	OLOR; 1420	Cecil Hills; 1180	St. Francis; 1030
Heat 4 20–24 April	Scots College; 1440	Macquarie Fields; 1360	Norwest; 1180
Heat 5 27 April–1 May	Pymble Ladies College; 1450	Quakers Hill; 1420	Busby West; 1030
Heat 6 4–8 May	Cammaray; 1500	Northcross; 1320	Cobbity; 1130
Heat 7 11–15 May			
Heat 8 18–22 May			
Heat 9 25–29 May			
Semi-Final 1 1–5 June	Pymble Ladies College unknown	Darcy Road unknown	Our Lady of the Rosary unknown
Semi-Final 2 8–12 June			
Semi-Final 3 15–19 June			
Grand Final 22–26 June	Pymble Ladies College; 1390	Georges Hall Public; 1350	Ironbark Ridge Public; 1220

=== Season 9 (2009) ===
Episode	First Place	Second Place	Third Place
Heat 1 14–18 September	Oatley West Public; 1470	Gwynneville Public; 1280	Blaxland Public; 1190
Heat 2 21–25 September	Normanhurst Public; 1390	Rosehill Public; 1350	Bald Face Public; 1240
Heat 3 28 September–2 October	Malek Fahd Islamic; 1480	Birrong Public; 1240	Unity Grammar; 1100
Heat 4 5–9 October	Caddies Creek Public; 1320	Glenwood Public; 1260	Windsor Public; 1170
Heat 5 12–16 October	Manly West Public; 1410	St. Francis of Assisi; 1320	Revesby Public; 1170
Heat 6 19–23 October	Penrith Anglican College; 1310	Turramurra North Public; 1300	Hannans Road Public; 1020
Heat 7 26–30 October	Toongabbie Public; 1480	Neutral Bay Public; 1440	Matraville Soldiers Settlement Public; 1150
Heat 8 2–6 November	Connells Point Public; 1450	Tyndale Christian; 1290	Briar Road Public; 1070
Heat 9 9–13 November	Loftus Public; 1230	Killara Public; 1200	Oakville Public; 1150
Semi-Final 1 16–20 November	Malek Fahd Islamic; 1410	Caddies Creek Public; 1320	Manly West Public; 1270
Semi-Final 2 23–27 November	Toongabbie Public; 1360	Normanhurst Public; 1270	Loftus Public; 1140
Semi-Final 3 30 November–4 December	Connells Point Public; 1420	Oatley West Public; 1370	Penrith Anglican College; 1240
Grand Final 7–11 December	Connells Point Public; 1350	Malek Fahd Islamic; 1260	Toongabbie Public; 1250

=== Season 10 (Summer Series) (2009) ===
Episode	First Place	Second Place	Third Place
Heat 1 14 December	Oatley West Public; 250	Gwynneville Public; 230	Blaxland Public; 210
Heat 2 15 December	Bald Face Public; 260	Rosehill Public; 250	Normanhurst Public; 240
Heat 3 16 December	Birrong Public; 290	Malek Fahd Islamic School; 230	Unity Grammar; 190
Heat 4 17 December	Glenwood Public; 330	Windsor Public; 210	Caddies Creek Public; 180
Heat 5 18 December	St. Francis of Assisi; 290	Manly West Public; 270	Revesby Public; 180
Heat 6 21 December	Penrith Anglican College unknown		
Heat 7 22 December	Toongabbie Public; 290	Neutral Bay Public; 260	Matraville Soldiers' Settlement Public; 230
Heat 8 23 December	Briar Road Public; 280	Connells Point Public; 270	Tyndale Christian; 190
Heat 9 24 December	Killara Public; 230	Loftus Public; 220	Oakville Public; 210
Semi-Final 1 27 December	Glenwood Public; 240	Toongabbie Public; 220	Penrith Anglican College; 220
Semi-Final 2 28 December	Gwynneville Public; 230	Briar Road Public; 210	St. Francis of Assisi; 210
Semi-Final 3 29 December	Bald Face Public; 310	Birrong Public; 260	Killara Public; 260
Grand Final 30–31 December	Gwynneville Public; 440	Bald Face Public; 430	Glenwood Public; 360

=== Season 11 (2010) ===
Episode	First Place	Second Place	Third Place
Heat 1 5–9 April	Lane Cove Public; 1420	Berala Public; 1250	Bangor Public; 1170
Heat 2 12–16 April	All Saints Grammar; 1290	Balgowlah Heights Public; 1170	Willoughby Public; 1170
Heat 3 19–23 April	North Rocks Public; 1380	Greenwich Public; 1300	Newtown North Public; 1230
Heat 4 26–30 April	Burwood Public*; 1300	Carlton Public; 1300	Baulkham Hills North Public; 1260
Heat 5 3–7 May	Mosman Church of England Prep; 1510	Lindfield East Public; 1280	Botany Public; 1040
Heat 6 10–14 May	Gymea Bay Public; 1280	Five Dock Public; 1210	Green Valley Public; 1070
Heat 7 17–21 May	Erskineville Public; 1280	Harrington Park Public; 1190	St. Joachim's Primary; 1120
Heat 8 24–28 May	Tharawal Public; 1240	Burraneer Bay Public; 1220	Forest Lodge Public; 1130
Heat 9 31 May–4 June	Bankstown Public Alex Mac; 1430	Kent Road Public; 1270	Kirrawee Public; 1220
Semi-Final 1 7–11 June	North Rocks Public; 1470	Mosman Church of England Prep; 1350	All Saints Grammar; 1200
Semi-Final 2 14–18 June	Erskineville Public; 1340	Lane Cove Public; 1300	Burwood Public; 1290
Semi-Final 3 21–25 June	Gymea Bay Public; 1400	Bankstown Public; 1360	Tharawal Public; 1140
Grand Final 28 June–2 July	North Rocks Public; 1320	Erskineville Public; 1270	Gymea Bay Public; 1270

=== Season 12 (2010) ===
Episode	First Place	Second Place	Third Place
Heat 1 5–9 July	Hornsby Heights Public; 1510	Prairievale Public; 1450	St. Bernadette's Primary; 1190
Heat 2 12–16 July	St. Andrew's Primary; 1280	Belmore North Public; 1260	Sydney Adventist College; 1240
Heat 3 19–23 July	Harrington Street Public; 1380	Mortlake Public; 1370	Liverpool Public; 1280
Heat 4 26–30 July	St. Patrick's Primary Sutherland; 1510	Glenfield Public; 1400	Terrey Hills Public; 1180
Heat 5 2–6 August	Casula Public; 1430	St. Monica's Primary; 1290	Wentworthville Public; 1210
Heat 6 9–13 August	Calare Public; 1390	Galilee Primary; 1360	Mary Immaculate Primary; 1260
Heat 7 16–20 August	Berowra Public; 1600	St. Aloysius Primary; 1310	Turramurra Public; 1280
Heat 8 23–27 August	Earlwood Public; 1430	South Coogee Public; 1310	Iqra Grammar; 1120
Heat 9 30 August–3 September	Hurstville Public; 1420	Murray Farm Public; 1390	Lansvale Public; 1350
Semi-Final 1 6–10 September	Calare Public; 1420	St. Andrew's Primary; 1320	Hornsby Heights Public; 1200
Semi-Final 2 13–17 September	Casula Public; 1480	Harrington Street Public; 1370	Berowra Public; 1340
Semi-Final 3 20–24 September	Hurstville Public; 1500	Earlwood Public; 1370	St. Patrick's Primary Sutherland; 1300
Grand Final 27 September–1 October	Casula Public; 1460	Hurstville Public; 1340	Calare Public; 1210

=== Season 13 (2011) ===
Episode	First Place	Second Place	Third Place
Heat 1 4–8 April	St. Agatha's Primary; 1380	Merrylands East; 1200	Sacred Heart; 1070
Heat 2 11–15 April	Cessnock West Public; 1290	Epping Public; 1260	Killarney Hights; 1220
Heat 3 18–22 April	Hurstville South Public; 1420	Macquarie; 1230	King Park; 1180
Heat 4 25–29 April	Beverly Hills North Public; 1280	Riverstone; 1180	Yowie Bay; 1160
Heat 5 2–6 May	St. Johns Park Public; 1380	Regentville; 1240	St. Paul of the Cross Primary; 1200
Heat 6 9–13 May	Crestwood Public; 1460	Woolooware Public; 1250	Hunters Hill Public; 1170
Heat 7 16–20 May	West Ryde Public; 1430	St. Bernard's Primary; 1240	Bonnyrigg Heights Public; 1100
Heat 8 23–27 May	St. Charbel's College; 1240	Sylvania Heights Public; 1110	Leppington Public; 1110
Heat 9 30 May–3 June	St. Finbar's Primary; 1360	York Public; 1330	Mar Narsai Assyrian College; 1070
Semi-Final 1 6–10 June	Crestwood Public; 1310	Cessnock West Public; 1240	St. Agatha's Primary; 1130
Semi-Final 2 13–17 June	St. Johns Park Public; 1310	Hurstville South Public; 1300	St. Charbel's College; 1260
Semi-Final 3 20–24 June	West Ryde Public; 1330	Beverly Hills North Public; 1260	St. Finbar's Primary; 1240
Grand Final 27 June–1 July	Crestwood Public; 1440	St. Johns Park Public; 1390	West Ryde Public; 1170

=== Season 14 (2011) ===
Episode	First Place	Second Place	Third Place
Heat 1 3–7 October	St. Patrick's College; 1460	St. Mel's Primary; 1440	Eastwood Public; 1170
Heat 2 10–14 October	Haberfield Public; 1390	Croydon Public; 1380	Hebersham Public; 1240
Heat 3 17–21 October	Bellevue Hill Public; 1530	Newbridge Heights; 1420	Annandale North Public; 1270
Heat 4 24–28 October	Pymble Public*; 1350	Claremont Meadows; 1350	Bronte Public; 1310
Heat 5 31 October–4 November	St. Michael's Primary; 1390	Brighton Le Sands Public; 1310	Glendenning Public; 1190
Heat 6 7–11 November	Kingsgrove Public; 1520	Caringbah North Public; 1510	Hassal Grove Public; 1350
Heat 7 14–18 November	Leumeah Public; 1480	St. Andrews Public; 1290	Crawford Public; 1230
Heat 8 21–25 November	Sutherland Public; 1530	Our Lady Help of Christians; 1320	Coogee Public; 1210
Heat 9 28 November–2 December	Stanmore Public; 1370	Balgowlah North Public; 1320	Carlton South Public; 1230
Semi-Final 1 5–9 December	St. Michael's Primary; 1460	Sutherland Public; 1410	St. Patrick's College; 1370
Semi-Final 2 12–16 December	Leumeah Public; 1450	Bellevue Hill Public; 1410	Stanmore Public; 1190
Semi-Final 3 19–23 December	Kingsgrove Public; 1380	Haberfield Public; 1300	Pymble Public; 1290
Grand Final 26–30 December	Leumeah Public; 1530	St. Michael's Primary; 1330	Kingsgrove Public; 1260

=== Season 15 (2012) ===
Episode	First Place	Second Place	Third Place
Heat 1 1–5 October	Northmead Public; 1300	St. Francis of Assisi Primary; 1240	Our Lady of the Sacred Heart Primary; 1210
Heat 2 8–12 October	Peakhurst Public; 1410	Ashbury Public; 1280	Warragamba Public; 1130
Heat 3 15–19 October	Minchinbury Public; 1240	St. Anthony's Primary; 1230	Ilawong Public; 1210
Heat 4 22–26 October	Chisholm Catholic Primary; 1230	Eastern Creek Public; 1200	Gordon East Public; 1130
Heat 5 29 October–2 November	Samuel Gilbert Public; 1510	Windsor Park Public; 1140	Yarrawarrah Public; 990
Heat 6 5–9 November	Newington College; 1380	Cronulla South Public; 1350	Como West Public; 1140
Heat 7 12–16 November	Wideview Public; 1310	Lugarno Public; 1200	Our Lady Queen of Peace; 1170
Heat 8 19–23 November	Marayong South Public; 1370	Hornsby South Public; 1250	Curl Curl North Public; 1190
Heat 9 26–30 November	Hornsby North Public; 1290	Rydalemere East Public; 1230	William Carey Christian; 1180
Semi-Final 1 3–7 December	Hornsby North Public; 1400	Marayong South Public; 1380	Samuel Gilbert Public; 1020
Semi-Final 2 10–14 December	Wideview Public; 1320	Peakhurst Public; 1240	Minchinbury Public; 1190
Semi-Final 3 17–21 December	Newington College; 1370	Northmead Public; 1320	Chisholm Catholic Primary; 1100
Grand Final 24–28 December	Hornsby North Public; 1470	Newington College; 1400	Wideview Public; 1060

=== Season 16 (2013) ===
Episode	First Place	Second Place	Third Place
Heat 1 4–8 February	Chester Hill Public; 1430	Bargo Public; 1230	Hillsborough Public; 1170
Heat 2 11–15 February	Penshurst West Public; 1390	Padstow Park Public; 1290	Kurrajong Public; 1200
Heat 3 18–22 February	Clairgate Public; 1300	St. Christopher's Primary; 1260	Henry Fulton Public; 1190
Heat 4 25 February–1 March	Mosman Public; 1540	Cabramatta Public; 1330	Camden Public; 1080
Heat 5 4–8 March	Peakhurst West Public; 1340	Nouméa Public; 1190	Kenthurst Public; 1170
Heat 6 11–15 March	Campbelltown Public; 1230	St. Thomas Catholic Primary; 1200	Austral Public; 1110
Heat 7 18–22 March	St. Mary's Primary; 1350	Dalmeny Public; 1320	Rutherford Public; 1240
Heat 8 25–29 March	Thornton Public; 1360	St. Brendan's Catholic Primary; 1200	St. Joseph's Primary; 1080
Heat 9 1–5 April	Fairfield West Public; 1460	Broughton Anglican College; 1250	St. Jerome's Primary; 1210
Semi-Final 1 8–12 April	Mosman Public; 1290	Thornton Public; 1230	Clairgate Public; 1150
Semi-Final 2 15–19 April	Peakhurst West Public; 1430	St. Mary's Primary; 1390	Chester Hill Public; 1130
Semi-Final 3 22–26 April	Penshurst West Public; 1310	Fairfield West Public; 1250	Campbelltown Public; 1240
Grand Final 29 April–3 May	Penshurst West Public; 1350	Peakhurst West Public; 1330	Mosman Public; 1230

=== Season 17 (2013–14) ===
Episode	First Place	Second Place	Third Place
Heat 1 21–25 October 2013	St. Ignatius College; 1320	Christ the King North Rocks; 1300	Homebush West Public; 1250
Heat 2 28 October–1 November 2013	Beacon Hill Public; 1390	Peakhurst South Public; 1310	Canterbury South Public; 1200
Heat 3 4–8 November 2013	Immaculate Heart of Mary Sefton; 1330	Holy Spirit Primary; 1190	Cambridge Gardens Public; 1070
Heat 4 11–15 November 2013	Drummoyne Public; 1280	Miranda Public; 1260	Lurnea Public; 1160
Heat 5 18–22 November 2013	Christian Brothers Lewisham; 1430	Harbord Public; 1350	Cabramatta West Public; 1270
Heat 6 25–29 November 2013	Cherrybrook Public; 1390	Newport Public; 1250	Edensor Park Public; 1090
Heat 7 2–6 December 2013	Guildford West Public; 1340	Miranda North Public; 1230	Springwood Public; 990
Heat 8 9–13 December 2013	Lidcombe Public; 1320	Ingleburn Public; 1180	Mount Annan Public; 1130
Heat 9 16–20 December 2013	Glenhaven Public; 1440	Thomas Hassall College; 1280	St. Patrick’s Guildford; 1110
Semi-Final 1 23–27 December 2013	Glenhaven Public*; 1190	St. Ignatius College; 1190	Guildford West Public; 1180
Semi-Final 2 30 December 2013 – 3 January 2014	Drummoyne Public; 1410	Cherrybrook Public; 1260	Christian Brothers Lewisham; 1230
Semi-Final 3 6–10 January 2014	Beacon Hill Public; 1440	Lidcombe Public; 1270	Immaculate Heart of Mary Sefton; 1260
Grand Final 13–17 January 2014	Glenhaven Public; 1230	Beacon Hill Public; 1160	Drummoyne Public; 1110

=== Season 18 (2014) ===
Episode	First Place	Second Place	Third Place
Heat 1 28 April–2 May	Mount Druitt Public; 1300	Prestons Public; 1270	Barnsley Public; 1130
Heat 2 5–9 May	Greystanes Public; 1560	Annandale Public; 1210	Glenmore Park Public; 1180
Heat 3 12–16 May	Lindfield Public; 1430	Sackville Street Public; 1290	Rosemeadow Public; 1150
Heat 4 19–23 May	Smithfield Public; 1430	Emanuel School; 1390	Penrith South Public; 1280
Heat 5 26–30 May	Holy Family Primary; 1260	Fairvale Public; 1220	Plumpton Public; 1220
Heat 6 2–6 June	Lucas Heights Community; 1230	Banksmeadow Public; 1160	Lethbridge Park Public; 1140
Heat 7 9–13 June	Dubbo Public; 1250	Dapto Public; 1220	Tighes Hill Public; 1160
Heat 8 16–20 June	New Lambton Public; 1470	Robert Townson Public; 1220	St. Mary's Primary; 1100
Heat 9 23–27 June	Beecroft Public; 1560	St. Joseph's Primary; 1260	Werrington County Public; 1210
Semi-Final 1 30 June–4 July	Beecroft Public; 1450	Smithfield Public; 1320	Lucas Heights Community; 1130
Semi-Final 2 7–11 July	Greystanes Public; 1550	Holy Family Primary; 1100	Mount Druitt Public; 1080
Semi-Final 3 14–18 July	New Lambton Public; 1490	Lindfield Public; 1280	Dubbo Public; 1220
Grand Final 21–25 July	Greystanes Public; 1510	Beecroft Public; 1380	New Lambton Public; 1350

=== Season 19 (2014–15) ===
Episode	First Place	Second Place	Third Place
Heat 1 10–14 November 2014	St. Angela's; 1250	Sacred Heart; 1240	St. FX Ashbury; 1200
Heat 2 17–21 November 2014	Abbotsleigh; 1430	Ramsgate; 1300	All Hallows; 1120
Heat 3 24–28 November 2014	Vardy's Road; 1240	Malabar; 1150	Ferncourt; 1090
Heat 4 1–5 December 2014	St. Therese's; 1250	Roselea; 1200	Heckenberg; 1190
Heat 5 8–12 December 2014	Trinity Grammar; 1500	Currans Hill; 1240	St. Brendan's; 1200
Heat 6 15–19 December 2014	Forestville; 1390	St. Patrick's; 1220	Warwick Farm; 1150
Heat 7 22–26 December 2014	Parramatta West Public; 1260	Eastwood Heights Public; 1190	Georges River Grammar; 1090
Heat 8 29 December 2014 – 2 January 2015	OLGC Forestville; 1270	Richmond (Captained by Sierra Sparks); 1180	Holy Saviour; 990
Heat 9 5–9 January 2015	Allambie Heights; 1370	Hills Grammar; 1310	St. Michael's; 1090
Semi-Final 1 12–16 January 2015	Trinity Grammar; 1430	Parramatta West Public; 1310	St. Therese's; 1120
Semi-Final 2 19–23 January 2015	Abbotsleigh; 1410	St. Angela's; 1300	OLGC Forestville; 1200
Semi-Final 3 26–30 January 2015	Forestville; 1370	Allambie Heights; 1250	Vardy's Road; 1220
Grand Final 2–6 February 2015	Trinity Grammar; 1420	Abbotsleigh; 1320	Forestville; 1210

=== Season 20 (2015–16) ===
Episode	First Place	Second Place	Third Place
Heat 1 19–23 October 2015	St. Luke's Primary; 1510	Mimosa Public; 1250	Bennett Road Public; 1070
Heat 2 26–30 October 2015	Hinchinbrook Public; 1420	Sacred Heart Catholic Primary; 1220	Hilltop Road Public; 1160
Heat 3 2–6 November 2015	St. Charles Primary; 1390	St. Matthew's Catholic Primary; 1290	St. Patrick's Primary; 1130
Heat 4 9–13 November 2015	Sutherland Shire Christian; 1450	William Stimson Public School; 1270	Henry Fulton Public; 1090
Heat 5 16–20 November 2015	Lynwood Park Public; 1500	Santa Sabina College Strathfield; 1410	Alfords Point Public; 1090
Heat 6 23–27 November 2015	Waitara Public; 1520	Seaforth Public; 1240	Harcourt Public; 1200
Heat 7 30 November–4 December 2015	Maroubra Junction Public; 1380	St. Michael's Catholic Primary; 1130	Werrington Public; 1080
Heat 8 7–11 December 2015	International Grammar School Ultimo; 1430	Dundas Public; 1340	Canley Heights Public; 1320
Heat 9 14–18 December 2015	Pacific Hills Christian; 1340	St. Kevin's Catholic Primary; 1280	Warrawee Public; 1200
Semi-Final 1 21–25 December 2015	Sutherland Shire Christian; 1420	Lynwood Park Public; 1300	St. Charles Primary; 1270
Semi-Final 2 28 December 2015 – 8 January 2016 (Split over 2 weeks)	Waitara Public; 1570	St. Luke's Primary; 1330	Hinchinbrook Public; 1260
Semi-Final 3 11–15 January 2016	International Grammar School Ultimo; 1430	Pacific Hills Christian; 1430	Maroubra Junction Public; 1280
Grand Final 18–22 January 2016	Waitara Public; 1460	International Grammar School Ultimo; 1330	Sutherland Shire Christian; 1310

== Notes ==
- Heat 3 of Season 2 ended in a tie. A student from Quakers Hill East Public answered correctly so they made it to the semi-finals.
- Heat 5 of Season 3 ended in a tie. A student from Kings Langley answered incorrectly so Patrician made it to the semi-finals.
- Heat 1 of Season 6 ended in a tie. A student from Rockdale Public answered correctly so they made it to the semi-finals.
- Heat 5 of Season 6 ended in a tie. A student from Hazelbrook Public answered correctly so they made it to the semi-finals.
- Heat 4 of Season 11 ended in a tie. A student from Burwood answered correctly so they made it to the semi-finals.
- Heat 3 of Season 12 ended in a tie. Harring Street Public answered correctly to progress to the semi-finals.
- Semi-Final 3 of Season 20 ended in a tie. A student from Pacific Hills Christian School, named Joshua Kouts answered incorrectly, so International Grammar School Ultimo progressed to the grand final.

== See also ==
- Australia's Brainiest Kid
- The Weakest Link
- Million Dollar Minute
- List of Australian television series
