= Good Morning Sydney =

- Genre: morning show
- Presented by: Andrew Harwood; Maureen Duval
- Country of origin: Australia
- Original language: English
- No. of seasons: 12

Production
- Production locations: Sydney, New South Wales

Original release
- Network: Network Ten
- Release: 1978 – 1989

Related
- Til Ten (1989-1991)

Good Morning Sydney is an Australian local morning show which aired on Network Ten in New South Wales only in between 1978 until 1989. It was hosted by Maureen Duval from 1978 to 1988.
