= Sport in Question =

Australian game quiz show

- Presented by: Andrew Harwood
- Country of origin: Australia
- Original language: English

Production
- Running time: 30 minutes

Original release
- Network: ABC TV
- Release: 30 June – 23 July 1986

Sport in Question is a 1986 Australian television quiz show broadcast on the Australian Broadcasting Corporation. It asked sports questions partly built around archived sports footage. It debuted on 30 June 1986. Running for 15 episodes it was hosted by Andrew Harwood and featured 16 competitors drawn from 700 applications. They were competing for the main prize of a trip to any sporting event.
