= Trevor Drayton =

Australian winemaker

Trevor Drayton (18 February 1955 – 17 January 2008) was an Australian winemaker, frequently described as an "icon" of the Australian wine industry. Drayton's Wines have been in the industry since 1853.

First educated at Cessnock High School, he studied oenology at the Roseworthy Agricultural College in South Australia, being dux in his final year there in 1978. His wine memberships include being president of the Hunter Valley Vineyard Association for four years and treasurer for ten and a member of the Winemakers' Federation of Australia's small winemakers' membership committee for five years.

Drayton died in an explosion at the Drayton's family winery in Oakey Creek Road, Pokolbin, in the Lower Hunter Valley region of New South Wales, Australia. The blast reportedly demolished a 20-meter brick wall and blew away parts of the building up to 50 meters. Both Drayton and a contractor, Eddie Orgo, were killed in the explosion. William Rikard-Bell survived suffering burns to more than 80% of his body; William continued working with the Draytons until 2011. It is believed workmen were using welding equipment when ethanol vapors contained in a large metal tank ignited, ultimately destroying the winery.
