= Chatswood Public School =

Public school in New South Wales, Australia

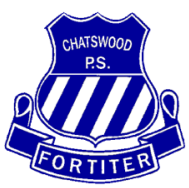

Location
- Chatswood, New South Wales; Australia
- Coordinates: 33°47′54″S 151°10′42″E

Information
- Type: Government public school
- Motto: Latin: Fortiter (With Firmness In Action)
- Established: 1883
- Principal: Cameron Jones
- Colours: Blue and white
- Website: chatswood-p.schools.nsw.gov.au

Chatswood Public School is a primary and public school that was founded in 1883, located in the suburb of Chatswood in Sydney, New South Wales, Australia. This school provides a playground which has been changed throughout the years and four buildings.

== Sport ==
Chatswood Public School is involved in many Sporting Activities, and is involved it is involved in one PSSA competition, Ku-Ring-Gai district competition. In 2007, the Chatswood Public School Senior A's Cricket and Soccer Team came first in the Ku-Ring-Gai cricket and soccer competitions. The Summer sports consists of Modball (Tee-ball), Cricket and Oztag and the Winter sports consist of Netball, Australian rules football and Soccer. The School has annual Athletics, Swimming and Cross Country Carnivals, in which students are chosen to represent the school in higher grades.

The four sporting houses, all named after early governors of Australia, are:

- Phillip (Blue) Named after Arthur Phillip
- Hunter (Yellow) Named after John Hunter
- King (Red) Named after Phillip Gidley King
- Bligh (Green) Named after William Bligh

== Chatswood Education Precinct ==
They have now completed the 2 buildings built on site and have moved in the building since the start of 2023, along with the nearby Chatswood High School. All buildings on the high school site have been substantially refurbished for use by years 10–12 from the high school. The primary school will move into new four-storey buildings on the primary school site.

== Notable alumni ==
- Brett Whiteley – artist
- Roger Woodward – concert pianist and Australian Living Treasure
- Charlie Macartney – Former cricket player and inductee to the Australian Cricket Hall of Fame
- Danielle Spencer – actress and singer/songwriter
- Adam Spencer – radio presenter, comedian and media personality
- Victor Smith – First Australian naval officer to reach four star rank
