= Andrew Harwood (television host) =

Australian actor

- Born: 7 September 1945; Australia
- Died: 6 February 2008 (aged 62); Australia
- Occupations: Australian quiz show host, announcer and actor

Andrew Harwood (7 September 1945 – 6 February 2008) was an Australian quiz show host, announcer and actor. He had a career that spanned over 40 years in the Australian entertainment industry.

== Career ==
Harwood was the son of Ena Harwood, a panellist on Beauty and the Beast, an Australian talk show. His career began at a radio station in Warwick, Queensland. Harwood moved to Sydney after a job offer from radio station 2KY. He next worked as a voice announcer on the Seven Network).

Through his work at Channel Seven, Harwood was chosen as the television presenter of It's Academic, which he hosted from 1971 until 1979. He then became the compere of the Australian version of the Jeopardy! game show. Harwood's other quiz shows included Class of 82, Class of 83 and Sport in Question.

Harwood also regularly appeared as a supporting actor in the Paul Hogan Show. Additionally, he also hosted several Miss New South Wales beauty pageants during the 1970s and 1980s.

Harwood went on to host Good Morning Sydney. He also made regular appearances on the At Home show. Harwood then hosted Til Ten, which aired on Channel Ten, for three years.

Harwood performed in a series of dinner theatre comedy shows in 1988 with Louise Burfitt-Dons.

== Filmography ==
=== Television ===
| Year | Title | Role | Type |
|---|---|---|---|
| 1967 | Transworld Top Team | Presenter | |
| 1971-79 | It's Academic | Presenter | TV game show |
| 1973 | Colleen | Self | TV special |
| 1975 | Certain Women | | TV series, 1 episode |
| 1974-78 | Jeopardy! | Host | TV game show |
| 1977 | Royal Children's Hospital Good Friday Appeal | Self | TV special |
| | Class of 82 | Host | TV series |
| | Class of 83 | Host | TV series |
| 1984 | Paul Hogan Show | Guest | TV sketch series |
| 1985 | A Thousand Skies | Local at Marble Bar | TV miniseries |
| 1986 | Sport in Question | Host | TV game show |
| 1988 | Good Morning Sydney | Host | TV series |
| | At Home | Regular | TV series |
| 1989-91 | Til Ten | Host | TV series |
| 2013 | Dead End Street | Extra | Short film |

== Death ==
Harwood died of respiratory failure following a severe asthma attack on 6 February 2008, at the age of 62. He was survived by his wife and two daughters.
