= Humpbacks: From Fire to Ice =

- Directed by: Ross Isaacs
- Narrated by: David Attenborough

Original release
- Network: ABC1

Humpbacks: From Fire to Ice is a 2008 nature documentary narrated by David Attenborough and directed by Ross Isaacs. The subject of the film is a newborn humpback whale and its first year of life. The film was produced by ABC1, and premiered on 16 November 2008. The documentary explores the mating, courting, and feeding behaviours of the whales.
