= The Story of Bohemian Rhapsody =

The Story of Bohemian Rhapsody is a 2004 documentary about the song "Bohemian Rhapsody", which was written by the lead singer of Queen, Freddie Mercury.

== The program ==
The Story of Bohemian Rhapsody is narrated by Richard E. Grant, and runs for approximately 56 minutes. Throughout the programme, Brian May and Roger Taylor revisit the place where they recorded the 1975 album A Night at the Opera, and discuss the song and the video.
