= List of 2008 box office number-one films in Australia =

This is a list of films which placed number-one at the weekend box office in Australia during 2008. Amounts are in Australian dollars.

(N.B.: Seemingly improper dates are due to holiday weekends or other occasions. N/A denotes information that is not available from Urban Cinefile.)

== Number-one films ==
†	This implies the highest-grossing movie of the year.

#	Weekend end date	Film	Total weekend gross	Notes
1	6 January 2008	I Am Legend	$9,513,115	Alvin and the Chipmunks opens at #2 with $3,942,828.
2	13 January 2008	I Am Legend	$3,539,530	27 Dresses, which would later ascend to #1, opens with $3,497,746.
3	20 January 2008	Cloverfield	$2,561,831	27 Dresses nearly takes over the #1 spot again, with $2,544,657.
4	27 January 2008	27 Dresses	$1,553,581	A low box office #1 (due to the Australia Day weekend), with Sweeney Todd: The Demon Barber of Fleet Street and Juno close behind.
5	3 February 2008	Juno	$1,265,737	27 Dresses close to #1 again.
6	10 February 2008	Fool's Gold	$1,949,609	Fool's Gold opens close to a million stronger than Juno.
7	17 February 2008	Jumper	$3,408,959	Definitely, Maybe beaten by a margin of close to $2 million.
8	24 February 2008	Jumper	$1,728,693	The Bucket List and Rambo earn over a million also.
9	2 March 2008	Meet the Spartans	$1,388,526	The Bucket List a close second, with $1,199,630.
10	9 March 2008	10,000 BC	$2,222,655	Run Fatboy Run a far second, with less than a million intake.
11	16 March 2008	Vantage Point	$1,129,167	10,000 BC second by just over $50,000.
12	23 March 2008	Step Up 2: The Streets	$2,581,363	Opening significantly ahead of Dr. Seuss' Horton Hears a Who! and Drillbit Taylor.
13	30 March 2008	Dr. Seuss' Horton Hears a Who!	$1,555,540	Beating out Step Up 2 the Streets and action/drama Never Back Down.
14	6 April 2008	The Spiderwick Chronicles	$1,384,553	Semi-Pro a very close second, with $1,384,266.
15	13 April 2008	The Spiderwick Chronicles	$996,868	Superhero Movie ($995,151), Prom Night ($926,122) and Nim's Island ($845,212) close behind.
16	20 April 2008	Forgetting Sarah Marshall	$1,813,214	Street Kings second on $1,535,676.
17	27 April 2008	Forgetting Sarah Marshall	$1,632,851	Street Kings significantly behind at second.
18	4 May 2008	Iron Man	$6,200,353	Made of Honour (2nd) earns just $1,541,485.
19	11 May 2008	Iron Man	$3,375,533	What Happens in Vegas second with $2,439,239.
20	18 May 2008	Iron Man	$2,503,835	What Happens in Vegas a closer 2nd; 21 at 3rd.
21	25 May 2008	Indiana Jones and the Kingdom of the Crystal Skull	$9,733,329	Indiana Jones trumps Iron Man by millions.
22	1 June 2008	Indiana Jones and the Kingdom of the Crystal Skull	$5,774,030	What Happens in Vegas beats out Iron Man for second, but still beaten significantly.
23	8 June 2008	Sex and the City	$8,031,752	The Chronicles of Narnia: Prince Caspian denied first with $4,354,099.
24	15 June 2008	Sex and the City	$4,563,023	Prince Caspian 2nd, The Incredible Hulk 3rd.
25	22 June 2008	You Don't Mess with the Zohan	$4,276,523	Sex and the City at second; Kung Fu Panda opens at third on previews.
26	29 June 2008	Kung Fu Panda	$5,230,383	Get Smart second with $4,204,813.
27	6 July 2008	Hancock	$7,601,620	Kung Fu Panda descends to second.
28	13 July 2008	Mamma Mia! The Movie	$5,432,656	Hancock and Kung Fu Panda second and third.
29	20 July 2008	The Dark Knight	$11,779,716	Mamma Mia! $7 million under at second.
30	27 July 2008	The Dark Knight	$7,626,120	The X-Files: I Want to Believe opens at third.
31	3 August 2008	The Dark Knight	$4,576,178	Wanted opens at 2nd, The Bank Job at 4th.
32	10 August 2008	The Dark Knight	$2,944,294	Pineapple Express opens at fourth.
33	17 August 2008	The Dark Knight	$1,953,131	Taken opens at #2; Star Wars: The Clone Wars at #4; The Strangers at #7.
34	24 August 2008	Tropic Thunder	$3,051,215	Baby Mama opens at #5.
35	31 August 2008	Tropic Thunder	$1,938,866	Hellboy II: The Golden Army opens at #2 with $1,824,100.
36	7 September 2008	Tropic Thunder	$1,190,393	Make It Happen opens at #4; In Bruges at #5; Harold & Kumar Escape from Guantanamo Bay at #6; Son of Rambow at #16.
37	14 September 2008	The Mummy: Tomb of the Dragon Emperor	$3,509,055	Tropic Thunder down to 2nd; Funny Games opens at #18.
38	21 September 2008	WALL-E	$3,635,368	Step Brothers opens at #2; Wild Child at #4; Angus, Thongs and Perfect Snogging at #5.
39	28 September 2008	WALL-E	$2,667,221	Eagle Eye opens at #2; Journey to the Center of the Earth at #3; The House Bunny at #7.
40	5 October 2008	WALL-E	$2,698,876	Beverly Hills Chihuahua ascends to #3; The Duchess opens at #6; Babylon A.D. at #9; Disaster Movie at #11.
41	12 October 2008	Body of Lies	$2,104,319	My Best Friend's Girl opens at #8.
42	19 October 2008	Burn After Reading	$1,819,366	Max Payne opens at #2 with $1,168,949.
43	26 October 2008	Burn After Reading	$1,491,130	Saw V opens at #2 with $1,366,113; How to Lose Friends & Alienate People at #3.
44	2 November 2008	Burn After Reading	$1,134,136	Death Race opens at #2; RocknRolla at #3.
45	9 November 2008	Nights in Rodanthe	$1,371,546	Traitor opens at #5; Mirrors at #6.
46	16 November 2008	Nights in Rodanthe	$939,903	Sex Drive opens at #3; Dostana at #13.
47	23 November 2008	Quantum of Solace	$9,729,078	Nights in Rodanthe over $9 million behind #1 at #2; American Teen opens at #18.
48	30 November 2008	Australia †	$6,373,903	Big Stan opens at #3; Quarantine at #4.
49	7 December 2008	Australia †	$4,105,524	High School Musical 3: Senior Year opens a close second, earning $3,942,732.
50	14 December 2008	Twilight	$5,413,654	City of Ember opens at #9.
51	21 December 2008	Madagascar: Escape 2 Africa	$3,818,439	Twilight significantly behind at #2; Slumdog Millionaire opens at #7.
52	28 December 2008	The Curious Case of Benjamin Button	$3,276,799	The Day the Earth Stood Still ran a close second, earning $3,121,708. Bedtime Stories opens at #3; Vicky Cristina Barcelona at #11; Frost/Nixon at #12; I've Loved You So Long at #13.

== See also ==
- List of Australian films – Australian films by year
