= Peter Leonard (journalist) =

Australian journalist and newsreader

- Peter Leonard attending the 75th birthday celebrations for Canberra radio station 2CA on 14 November 2006
- Born: Peter Antony Leonard; 21 February 1942; Yass, New South Wales
- Died: 23 September 2008 (aged 66); Mawson, Australian Capital Territory
- Occupations: Journalist, newsreader
- Spouse: Gwen Leonard
- Children: 3

Peter Antony Leonard (21 February 1942 – 23 September 2008) was an Australian journalist and newsreader.

== Biography ==
He was born in Yass, New South Wales, the son of a Greek immigrant father who died when Peter was 17. He was educated at Yass Primary School then at Canberra Grammar School as a boarder. The family moved to Canberra in 1956.

Leonard had a number of jobs over his 45-year career history, commencing it at Canberra radio station 2CA in 1962, initially as a cadet copywriter and later as an announcer and newsreader. He moved to ABC Canberra in 1982 as a radio newsreader and later television newsreader and weather presenter. However, in his most recognisable role, Leonard presented WIN News in Canberra from 1991 until 20 July 2007.

From 1970 to 1988 he was also the media director for the National Capital Development Commission. From 1993 to 2003 he was head of national communications for the Pharmacy Guild.

He was an active participant in several charitable organisations. From 1989 to 1998 he was on the board of the ACT Cancer Council and also served on the board of the ACT Multiple Sclerosis Society. He became Honorary Ambassador for Canberra and the Canberra Citizen of the Year for 1991 in recognition of his community service and charity work.

In December 2007 he won the Chief Minister-Public Relations Institute of Australia (ACT Division) Award for Community Media. He was the first individual to receive the award.

Leonard was diagnosed with mesothelioma in January 2008 and died on 23 September 2008, aged 66. He was survived by his wife Gwen, children Matthew, Natasha and Nathan and grandchildren, Rachel, Phoebe, Sarah, Madeline, Nicholas and Thomas.

The funeral service for Peter Leonard was held on 29 September 2008, at All Saints Church of England, Ainslie. Family, friends and colleagues were among those in attendance.

It was announced (at the funeral service) in September 2008 that a journalism scholarship funded by the ACT Government and WIN-TV would be named in his honour.

== Peter Leonard Scholarship ==
The Peter Leonard Scholarship aims to recognise the extraordinary talents of some University of Canberra Journalism students each year. Winners receive $5000 and a two-week internship at WIN Television in Canberra. At least two runners-up each receive $1000 and a one-week internship at WIN.

=== Winners ===
2009 – Lisa Mosley
2010 – Philip Prior
2011 – Gabrielle Adams
2012 – Ashley Leal
2013 – Katarina Slavich
2014 – Alkira Reinfrank
2015 – Alison Hattley
2016 – Naomi Avery
2018 – Lewis Haskew
2019 – Laura Gale
2021 – Brooke Roff

=== Runners-up ===
2009 – Andrew Day, Kevin Room and Rahima Saikal
2010 – Ewan Gilbert and Lucy Zelic
2011 – Grace Keyworth and Alana Shegog
2012 – Dion Pretorius and Olivia Neethyrajah
2013 – Charlene Broad

Preceded by Peter Russell	WIN News Canberra newsreader 1991–2007	Succeeded by Jessica Good
