= Til Ten =

- Genre: Breakfast television
- Presented by: Andrew Harwood; Joan McInnes
- Country of origin: Australia
- Original language: English
- No. of seasons: 3

Production
- Production locations: Melbourne, Victoria

Original release
- Network: Network Ten
- Release: 30 January 1989 – 27 December 1991

Related
- Good Morning Melbourne (1981–1988); Good Morning Australia (1992–2005)

Til Ten is an Australian local morning show aired on Network Ten in between 30 January 1989 until 27 December 1991, hosted by Andrew Harwood and Joan McInnes.
