= Kevin Heinze =

Australian television presenter (1928–2008)

- Born: Kevin Carl Heinze; 1 April 1928; Australia
- Died: 1 September 2008 (aged 80)
- Occupations: Horticulturist; Television presenter Radio presenter
- Known for: "Sow What"

Kevin Carl Heinze (1 April 1928 – 1 September 2008) was a pioneering presenter of gardening on television in Australia. He hosted a gardening program for ABC Television entitled Sow What, which was mostly shot on location at his one-hectare home garden in Montrose, an outer suburb of Melbourne, from 1967 to 1988. He also presented for ABC Radio in Melbourne between 1967 and 2004. He was known for his "cheerio" sign off at the end of his programs. Heinze was an advocate for gardening in schools and initiated the School Garden Awards scheme in Victoria.

Following the death of his eight-year-old daughter Kim in 1974, an open day, attended by 50,000 people, was held at his garden to raise money for cancer research. He and his wife Jill eventually raised over half a million dollars for cancer research. He later became patron of the Kevin Heinze Garden Centre in Doncaster which provides gardening activities for people with disabilities.

Following a heart attack, Heinze died on 1 September 2008, aged 80. Most of his garden was donated to the local shire council to enable the public to visit in the future.
