= 2020 in Australian television =

This is a list of Australian television-related events, debuts, finales, and cancellations that were scheduled to occur in 2020, the 65th year of continuous operation of television in Australia.

== Events ==
=== February ===
Date	Event	Source
17	Following low ratings in Adelaide, Nine switches Millionaire Hot Seat and Nine News Adelaide's timeslots around. The first episode of Hot Seat in its new 4 pm timeslot is watched by just 5,000 viewers, easily beaten by Seven News in its 4 pm timeslot.	

=== March ===
Date	Event	Source
17	Nine News suspends their regional 6:00 pm bulletins indefinitely due to the COVID-19 pandemic, with reporters redeployed to the metropolitan bulletins in Sydney, Melbourne and Brisbane. Their news bulletins were to return on August 10 at a 5.30pm timeslot.	

=== May ===
Date	Event	Source
24	Seven West Media announces that they will be reducing the amount of advertising shown across their free-to-air channels.	

=== June ===
Date	Event	Source
1	Seven News United States correspondent Amelia Brace and freelance photojournalist Timothy Myers were assaulted in Washington DC while covering the George Floyd protests on Sunrise.	
3	In two separate incidents, Nine News European correspondents Sophie Walsh and Ben Avery were attacked while covering the George Floyd protests in the United Kingdom. Walsh was assaulted by a bystander during a live-cross to Nine's Adelaide evening news bulletin, while Avery was attacked while covering the story on the Today show. Neither were harmed.	
19	The Seven Network axes its afternoon talk show The Daily Edition due to economic pressures caused by the COVID-19 pandemic.	
22	The Daily Edition host Ryan Phelan is sacked by the Seven Network after being charged with assault occasioning actual bodily harm and common assault following a complaint made to police by his girlfriend.	
30	Pay television provider Foxtel ceases operations of its locally owned music television channels [V], MAX, Foxtel Smooth and the Country Music Channel. They were replaced by a new suite of music video networks operated by ViacomCBS Networks UK & Australia, which operates MTV, Nickelodeon, and free-to-air Network 10.	

=== July ===
Date	Event	Source
20	Emelia Jackson from Melbourne, Victoria wins the Back to Win Season of Masterchef Australia.	

=== August ===
Date	Event	Source
9	TNT-9, the station of the Southern Cross Austereo-owned Seven Network affiliate Seven Tasmania, goes off air during a Snowstorm on Newsreader's Rachel Williams' final bulletin in Nightly News 7 Tasmania.	
10	Ben Polson of Perth, WA wins the Fourth Season of Australian Ninja Warrior and First Ever Champion taking home $400,000.	

=== September ===
Date	Event	Source
11	A slew of Network 10 personalities bid farewell to viewers after the network makes them redundant and moves to centralise studio production of its individual state editions of 10 News First to Sydney and Melbourne while also changing the format of its morning program, Studio 10. Studio 10 panelist Kerri-Anne Kennerley and, newsreaders Natarsha Belling, Georgina Lewis, Rebecca Morse and Monika Kos, sport presenters Tim Gossage and Will Goodings and weather presenters Tim Bailey, Mike Larkan and Michael Schultz are all made redundant. Joe Hildebrand resigns from Studio 10 and Network 10 and signs up with Sydney radio station 2GB.	
14	New editions of 10 News First, including pre-recorded local segments for Brisbane and Adelaide, begin airing on Network 10. Sandra Sully, Matt Burke and Josh Holt commence presenting the Sydney and Brisbane editions from the TEN-10 studio in Sydney while Jennifer Keyte, Stephen Quartermain and Kate Freebairn start presenting the Melbourne and Adelaide bulletins from the ATV-10 studio in Melbourne. Narelda Jacobs and Josh Holt present the Perth bulletin from the TEN-10 studio in Sydney with the sport presented from the NEW-10 newsroom in Perth.	

=== November ===
Date	Event	Source
23	The first ever Today, Today Extra and A Current Affair are broadcast from the Nine Network's new North Sydney studios. On the same night, Nine News has a new studio set of its Sydney bulletin.	

=== December ===
Date	Event	Source
7	In Perth, Nine News follows Adelaide's lead back in February and switches timeslots with Millionaire Hot Seat heading to 4:00pm While the Afternoon News moves to 5:00pm in order to boost ratings of its 6:00pm Bulletin.	

== Television channels ==
=== New channels ===
- 16 January - 7mate HD
- 5 April - 9Rush
- 1 July - Club MTV, MTV Hits Australia, MTV Classic Australia (Foxtel only), NickMusic, CMT
- 27 September - 10 Shake

=== Channel closures ===
- 30 April - Disney Channel, Disney Junior, Disney XD
- 1 July - [V], MAX, CMC, Foxtel Smooth

== Premieres ==
=== Domestic series ===
List of domestic television series premieres
Program	Original airdate	Network	Source
The Gloaming	1 January	Stan	

=== International series ===
List of international television series premieres
Program	Original airdate	Network	Country of origin	Source
Beyblade Burst Rise	15 March	9Go!	Japan	
Kaijudo	8 April	9Go!	United States	
Fruits Basket (2019)	19 June	ABC Me	Japan	
Bakugan: Armored Alliance	27 July	9Go!	Japan/Canada	
Power Players	5 September	9Go!	France	

== Deaths ==
Name	Date	Age	Broadcast notability	Reference
Tom Long	5 January	aged 51	United States-born Australian actor best known for serials East of Everything, The Dish and SeaChange	
Ron Haddrick	11 February	aged 90	Actor, former sportsman and narrator known for Home and Away as Gordon Macklin	
Hutton "Red" Gibson	11 May	aged 101	Father of actor Mel Gibson and American sedevacantist best known in Australia for his six-figure win on Ford Superquiz	
Louise Pajo	23 November	aged 79	New Zealand-born Australian actress, who appeared on Doctor Who, before numerous roles in Australia	

== See also ==
- 2020 in Australia
- List of Australian films of 2020
