= 2010 in Australian television =

This is a list of Australian television events and premieres which occurred, or were scheduled to occur, in 2010. The year 2010 will be the 55th year of continuous operation of television in Australia.

== Events ==
- 25 January – Sunrise launches its new analogue-styled on-air package, which is used until January 2016.
- 8 February – Seven News launches its new look in Sydney, Brisbane and Perth. Seven News has a block mark which carries the big red 7 with the word "NEWS" written on it – these are still unchanged to this indefinite date.
- 9 February – The Circle begins broadcasting on Network 10. The program is joined by Denise Drysdale, Chrissie Swan, Yumi Stynes and Gorgi Coghlan broadcasts live between 10 am and 12 pm. As a result, Ten's Morning Newshour is moved to 9 am weekdays.
- 15 February – Seven News launches its new look in Melbourne and Adelaide.
- 19 February – Weekend Sunrise begins airing on Saturdays.
- 2 March – Nine's Mornings with Kerri-Anne relaunches as Kerri-Anne, then begins airing on Saturdays with highlights during the week.
- 27–30 March – Hey Dad sexual abuse scandal (the sitcom previously screened on the Seven Network) takes place on Channel Nine's A Current Affair. ACA suddenly launched its new graphics on the Monday the story happened.
- 14 April – Hey Hey It's Saturday launches on Channel Nine. It also starts 2010 without Molly Meldrum, as he is contracted to the Seven Network and Foxtel.
- 2 May – Long-time Home and Away star Ray Meagher wins the 2010 TV Week Gold Logie.
- 2 June – Leanne Benbow becomes the third person (and the first woman ever to do so) to win the top prize of $200,000 on Deal or No Deal.
- 14 June – Paul Wolfenden becomes the third person to miss the final question on Millionaire Hot Seat.
- 15 June – Dance troupe Justice Crew win the fourth season of Australia's Got Talent.
- 24 June – The Seven Network announces they failed to complete negotiations with Metro-Goldwyn-Mayer for a new carriage deal for their films, and would ultimately replace it with another film studio once Seven's carriage deal with MGM had expired.
- 30 June – Analogue television broadcasts are switched off in the Mildura/Sunraysia area, becoming the first region in Australia to do so.
- 2 July – Nightline is axed by Nine Network for the second time since 2008, with presenter Kellie Connolly (now Kellie Sloane) being suspended from the network the same day.
- 16 July – After 34 years, Nine drops its coverage of Wimbledon, citing declining ratings. Seven subsequently picks up the rights.
- 22 July – ABC News 24 launches. The same day, ABC News launches its graphics, which the ABC uses until 2017.
- 25 July – 31-year-old Adam Liaw wins the second series of MasterChef Australia, beating 20-year-old Callum Hann, with the Grand Final recorded the ratings over 3.5 million people tuning in.
- 27 August – The six-thousandth episode of Australian soap opera Neighbours premieres to 512,000 viewers.
- 29 August – The DIY section presenter from Better Homes and Gardens Rob Palmer and his partner Alana Patience win the tenth season of Dancing with the Stars.
- 25 September – The Seven Network launches its new HD digital multichannel 7mate, replacing Seven HD, the first program broadcast was the drawn 2010 AFL Grand Final, on the same timeslot 7TWO relaunches format as a 'Best-of-British'-focused multichannel targeting people over 55.
- 26 September – The Nine Network launches its new HD digital multichannel GEM after failing to soft-launch two days earlier because of technical issues. Their on-air presentation and package are used until the on air theme relaunch in late 2015.
- 28 September – 17-year-old Amanda Ware wins the sixth cycle of Australia's Next Top Model, beating 19-year-old Kelsey Martinovich after Martinovich was initially announced the wrong winner by host and supermodel Sarah Murdoch.
- 8 October – Hi-5 airs its 500th episode.
- 28 October – Seven announces they will have a carriage output deal with Sony Pictures for channels 7TWO & 7mate, replacing Metro-Goldwyn-Mayer's carriage contract.
- 15 November – 12-year-old Queenslander, Isabella wins the first season of Junior MasterChef Australia
- 22 November – Altiyan Childs wins the second series of The X Factor.
- 30 November – Michael Venus resigns as news director of Nine News Melbourne.

== Celebrity deaths ==
Name	Age	Date of death	Occupation
Monica Maughan	76	8 January	Actress (The Box, Prisoner, The Damnation of Harvey McHugh)
Dave Grant	50	24 January	Stand-up comedian
Lynn Bayonas	66	25 January	Producer and writer
John McCallum	91	3 February (death recorded)	Actor and producer
Adriana Xenides	54	7 June	Actress and host
Michael Meagher	55	8 August	Journalist
Eric Walters	73	19 August	News presenter
Victoria Longley	49	29 August	Actress
Malcolm Douglas	69	23 September	Presenter and Documentary Maker
Norman Hetherington	89	6 December	Cartoonist, Presenter and Puppeteer
Gus Mercurio	82	7 December	Actor and Boxer
James Dibble	87	14 December	Newsreader and Presenter

== Channels ==
=== New channels ===
- 2010 – STVDIO
- 1 May 2010 – MTV Classic (replaced VH1)
- 10 June 2010 – Ten West (Regional Western Australia)
- 22 July 2010 – ABC News 24 (replaced ABC HD)
- 25 September 2010 – 7mate (replaces Seven HD)
- 26 September 2010 – GEM (replaces Nine HD)
- 1 November 2010 – Speed (HD)
- 1 November 2010 – MTV Hits
- 1 November 2010 – MTVN Live (HD)
- 1 November 2010 – BBC Knowledge HD
- 1 November 2010 – National Geographic Wild (HD)
- 1 November 2010 – Foxtel 3D

==== Shutdown channels ====
- 1 May 2010 – VH1 (replaced by MTV Classic)
- 2010 – Ovation (replaced by STVDIO)
- 22 July 2010 – ABC HD (replaced by ABC News 24)
- 25 September 2010 – Seven HD (replaced by 7mate)
- 26 September 2010 – Nine HD (replaced by GEM)
- 15 December 2010 – One SD

== Programming changes ==
=== Changes to network affiliation ===
This is a list of programs which made their premiere on an Australian television network that had previously premiered on another Australian television network. The networks involved in the switch of allegiances are predominantly both free-to-air networks or both subscription television networks. Programs that have their free-to-air/subscription television premiere, after previously premiering on the opposite platform (free-to air to subscription/subscription to free-to air) are not included. In some cases, programs may still air on the original television network. This occurs predominantly with programs shared between subscription television networks.

==== Domestic ====
Program	New network	Previous network	Date
Australia's Greatest Athlete	Seven Network	Nine Network	6 February
The Great Australian Doorstep	7Two	HOW TO Channel	6 February
Blinky Bill's Around the World Adventures	ABC2	Seven Network	23 February
Eclipse Music TV	Nine Network	Seven Network	8 April
Hot Property	Nine Network	Seven Network	28 July
Top Gear Australia	Nine Network	SBS One	19 October
The Adventures of Blinky Bill	ABC2	ABC1	15 November
Blinky Bill's Extraordinary Excursion	ABC2	ABC1	11 December

==== International ====
Program	New network(s)	Previous network(s)	Date
(United States) ER	Go!	Nine Network	7 January
(United Kingdom) That Mitchell and Webb Look	UKTV	ABC1	7 January
(United Kingdom) Don't Tell the Bride	LifeStyle You	The LifeStyle Channel	8 January
(United Kingdom) The Jonathan Ross Show	UKTV	Seven Network	10 January
(United States) King of the Hill	7Two	Seven Network	24 January
(United Kingdom) Gok's Fashion Fix	LifeStyle You	The LifeStyle Channel	28 January
(New Zealand) Shortland Street	ABC1	SBS One	28 January
(United States) Flavor of Love	MTV	VH1	6 February
(United Kingdom) Top Gear	Nine Network	SBS One	16 February
(United States) Mercy	7Two	Seven Network	17 February
(United States) The Sopranos	7Two	Nine Network	24 January
(United States) The Sopranos	7mate	7Two	27 September
(United Kingdom) Gavin & Stacey (Note: Gavin & Stacey was premiered by Seven in early 2009, From Series 2 onward UKTV had first-run rights, with ABC2 having rerun rights from 2010)	ABC2	Seven Network	25 February
(United Kingdom) The Legends of Treasure Island	7Two	ABC1	21 March
(United Kingdom) Woof!	7Two	Nine Network; ABC1	4 April
(Canada) Zero Hour	Network Ten	Seven Network	1 May
(United States) Celebrity Fit Club	LifeStyle You	VH1	18 August
(United States) Friends	GEM	Nine Network	26 September
(Canada) Mighty Ships	7mate	Seven Network	2 October
(United States) Two and a Half Men	FOX8	Arena	October
(United States) The Nanny	GEM	GO!	23 October
(United States) Murder, She Wrote	GEM	Go!	8 November
(United Kingdom) The Family	SBS One	Network Ten	Still to debut
(United Kingdom) Life Begins	SBS One	Seven Network	Still to debut

=== Free-to-air premieres ===
This is a list of programs which made their premiere on Australian free-to-air television that had previously premiered on Australian subscription television. Programs may still air on the original subscription television network.

==== International ====
Program	Free-to-air network	Subscription network	Date
(United States) The Colbert Report	ABC2	The Comedy Channel	5 January
(United States) Nightmares and Dreamscapes: From the Stories of Stephen King	GO!	Movie Extra	6 January
(United Kingdom) Seven Ages of Rock	ABC1	BBC Knowledge	7 January
(United Kingdom) Children of Earth	ABC2	UK.TV and BBC HD	8 January
(United Kingdom) I Dreamed a Dream: The Susan Boyle Story	Nine Network	UK.TV	17 January
(United States) Breaking Bad	ABC2	showcase	22 January
(United States) Why Ancient Egypt Fell	ABC1	Discovery Channel	26 January
(Canada) Durham County	ABC2	showcase	2 February
(United Kingdom) James May's Big Ideas	SBS One	BBC Knowledge	5 February
(United States) I'm From Rolling Stone	ABC2	MTV	15 February
(United States) The Neanderthal Code	ABC1	National Geographic Channel	25 February and 4 March
(Canada) Sanctuary	ABC2	Sci-Fi Channel	1 March
(United States) Saving Grace	Network Ten	showcase	2 March
(United States) Annie Leibovitz: Life Through a Lens	ABC2	Movie Extra	2 May
(Japan) Pokémon DP: Galactic Battles	Network Ten	Cartoon Network	16 December
(United Kingdom) Benidorm	7Two	UK.TV	Still to debut
(United States) Hung	7Two	showcase	Still to debut
(United States) The City	Go!	MTV	Still to debut

=== Subscription premieres ===
This is a list of programs which made their premiere on Australian subscription television that had previously premiered on Australian free-to-air television. Programs may still air on the original free-to-air television network.

==== Domestic ====
Program	Subscription network	Free-to-air network	Date
Who Do You Think You Are?	BBC Knowledge	SBS One	20 January

==== International ====
Program	Subscription network	Free-to-air network	Date
(United Kingdom) Around the World in 80 Gardens	BBC Knowledge	ABC1	5 January
(United Kingdom) Top Dogs: Adventures In War, Sea and Ice	BBC Knowledge	SBS One	6 January
(France) Casper's Scare School	Cartoon Network	ABC1	25 January
(United Kingdom) Moving Wallpaper	UKTV	ABC2	29 January
(United Kingdom) Echo Beach	UKTV	ABC2	29 January
(United Kingdom) Ashes to Ashes	UKTV	ABC1	10 February
(United Kingdom) World's Strictest Parents	The LifeStyle Channel	Seven Network	16 February
(United Kingdom) Mistresses	UK.TV	Seven Network	25 February
(United States) In Plain Sight	13th Street	Network Ten	12 March
(United Kingdom) Stanley Kubrick's Boxes	Bio.	ABC2	16 March
(United States) Big Love	showcase	SBS One	25 March
(United States) Eli Stone	Arena	Seven Network	5 May
(United States) Life	13th Street	Network Ten	7 May
(United Kingdom) George Gently	UKTV	ABC1	16 May
(United States) Dirty Sexy Money	Universal Channel	Seven Network	6 July
(United States) Keeping Up with the Kardashians	E!	Seven Network	10 August
(United Kingdom) Lilies	BBC Knowledge	ABC1	Still to debut

=== Ending this year ===
Program	Date	Channel	Debut
9am with David & Kim	29 January	Network Ten	30 January 2006
Maggie With...	January	Bio.	2001
Wilfred	26 March	SBS One	19 March 2007
The Shak	20 April 2010	Nine Network	27 March 2006

=== Returning this year ===
Program	Network	Debut date	Return date
Hey Hey It's Saturday	Nine Network	9 October 1971	14 April

== See also ==
- 2010 in Australia
- List of Australian films of 2010
