= MTV Music (Australia and New Zealand) =

MTV Music Australia
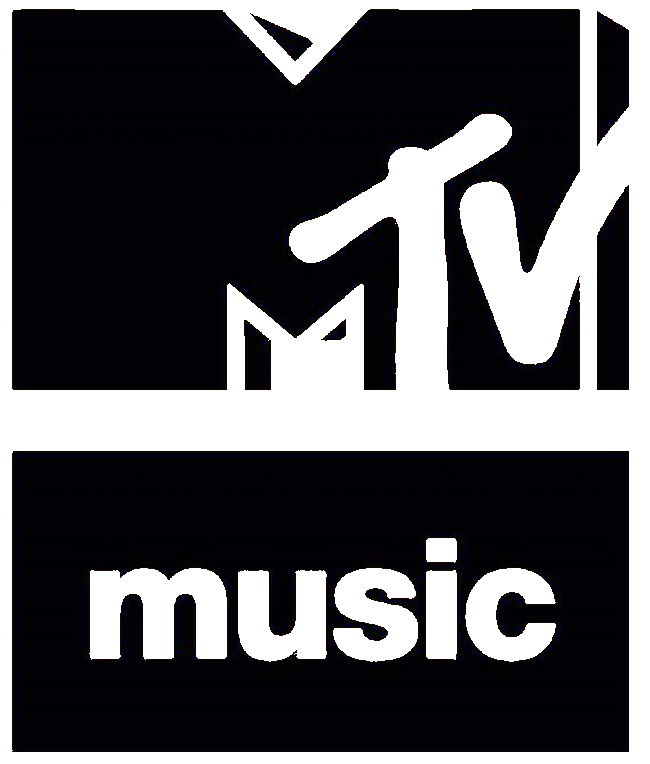
- Country: Australia; New Zealand
- Broadcast area: Australia; New Zealand

Programming
- Language: English
- Picture format: 720p HDTV (downscaled to 16:9 576i for the SDTV feed)

Ownership
- Owner: ViacomCBS Networks UK & Australia
- Sister channels: MTV; Club MTV; MTV Classic; NickMusic

History
- Launched: 3 December 2013
- Replaced: MTV Hits (Australia and NZ); MTV Classic (NZ)
- Closed: 1 July 2020; 6 years ago
- Replaced by: MTV Hits (2020 relaunch)

Links
- Website: mtv.com.au/mtv-music-au (Australia) mtv.com.au/mtv-music-nz-0 (New Zealand)

MTV Music was a 24-hour Australian and New Zealand subscription music channel which first launched on 3 December 2013.

== History ==
On 29 October 2013, MTV announced they had been working with Foxtel since early 2013 to offer more diversity on the Foxtel platform, as their two current music dedicated channels – MTV Classic and MTV Hits – fought for the same audience as Foxtel Networks channels MAX and [V] Hits respectively. As such, it was decided that MTV Classic and MTV Hits would cease broadcasting on the Foxtel platform to be replaced by two new MTV channels. The channel to replace MTV Hits was MTV Music, the same name of the number one UK music channel, which will feature pop, rock, urban and alternative music.

On 1 January 2014, MTV Music launched on Australian IPTV provider FetchTV.

On 1 December 2015, a localized version of MTV Music launched in New Zealand on Sky Television, replacing both MTV Classic and MTV Hits.

On 30 November 2016, MTV Music moved from channel 808 to 803 on the Foxtel platform.

On 15 February 2018, MTV Music was made available in HD for Fetch TV customers.

On 1 July 2020, the channel rebranded back to MTV Hits, as part of a wider deal between Foxtel and ViacomCBS.

MTV Hits was broadcast on Foxtel channel 801, taking the slot of the former Channel [V], until its closure.

== Logo history ==
Logo used from 3 December 2013 to 4 April 2017

Logo used from 5 April 2017 to February 2018

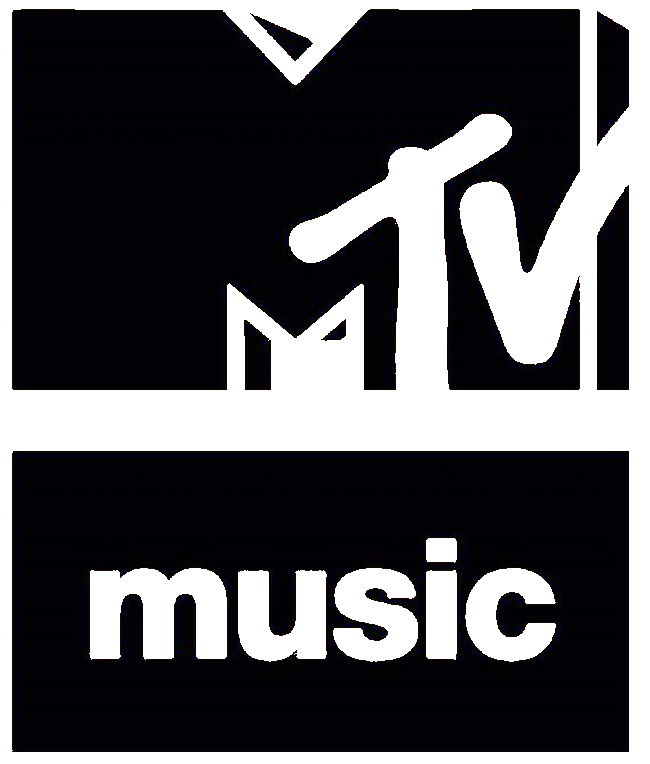
Final logo used from February 2018 to 1 July 2020

== Programs ==
They are automated blocks of hit music videos at all hours. Similar to MTV Dance, MTV Music only broadcasts three 5-minute commercial breaks each hour.

- #MTVBattle
- #TFIF
- 21 Under 21
- 30 Most Downloaded
- 100% Pop Classics
- A to Zedd on MTV
- Back to...
- Can't Get You Out of My Head
- Hot af x10
- Homegrown Hits
- Hungry, Hungry Hits
- Indie Mixtape
- Legit Hits
- MTV Artists Only
- MTV Asia Hits
- MTV Doodles
- MTV House Party
- MTV Likes
- MTV's Most Played x30/x40
- MTV Official Top 30
- MTV on the Go
- MTV Upload
- MTV Upload Encore
- Must See Vids x10
- Official Aria Chart x20/x10/x40
- OK Danceoke
- On Demand x20
- Night Shift
- RnB x Hip Hop
- That's So Nineties
- Throwback Tracks
- Toasty Tunes
- Upload of the Week
- USA x30
- What's New?

== See also ==
- Club MTV (Australian TV channel)
- NickMusic (Australian TV channel)
