= XYZnetworks =

- Company type: Private
- Industry: Subscription Television
- Defunct: 24 May 2012
- Successor: Foxtel Networks
- Headquarters: North Ryde, Australia
- Area served: Australia
- Products: Subscription Television Channels
- Owner: News Corporation (50%) & Telstra (50%)
- Number of employees: 170
- Parent: Foxtel; Austar
- Website: xyz.com.au

XYZnetworks was an Australian media company that owned, operated and distributed eleven subscription television channels in Australia. XYZnetworks was jointly owned by Foxtel and Austar. Based in Sydney, they had roughly 170 employees, with offices in North Ryde.

Some of the channels owned by XYZnetworks included:

- Arena aired celebrity buzz, women's entertainment,reality and talk shows. It was launched in 1995
- Channel [V] aired pop music songs and videos and was an Australian version of the Asian channel of the same name.
- Country Music Channel aired country music, videos and songs.
- Max was a sister channel to Channel V.
- The LifeStyle Channel and LifeStyle HD (a high definition simulcast) aired lifestyle shows. It launched in 1997.
- Lifestyle Food aired cuisine and taste reviews. Launched in 2004
- Lifestyle Home aired home renovation shows. Launched in 2011.
- Lifestyle You aired inspirational fashion and entertainment shows. Aired from 2009 until 2017.
- The Weather Channel Australia
- [V] Hits (formerly Channel [V]^{2} and Club [V]).

XYZnetworks also distributed Discovery Channel and jointly owned Nickelodeon and Nick Jr. XYZ operated Arena until 1 October 2007, when it became a channel wholly operated by parent company Foxtel, with XYZ still owning the channel.

On 24 May 2012, Foxtel and Austar merged resulting in Foxtel wholly owning XYZ Networks, resulting in Foxtel closing XYZ and moving all channels to Foxtel Networks.
