= Club MTV (Australia) =

Club MTV Australia
- Country: Australia
- Broadcast area: Australia

Programming
- Language: English
- Picture format: 720p HDTV (downscaled to 16:9 576i for the Foxtel feed)
- Timeshift service: Club MTV +2

Ownership
- Owner: Paramount Networks UK & Australia
- Sister channels: Network 10; 10 HD; 10 Bold; 10 Peach; MTV; MTV 80s MTV Hits; Nickelodeon (pay-TV); Nickelodeon (free-to-air); Nick Jr. NickMusic; Comedy Central; CMT

History
- Launched: 3 December 2013; 12 years ago
- Closed: 1 August 2023; 2 years ago
- Replaced by: Club MTV (European TV channel)
- Former names: MTV Dance (2013-2020)

Links
- Website: mtv.com.au/mtv-dance

Availability

Streaming media
- Fetch Mobi: Channel 238

Club MTV (formerly MTV Dance) was an Australian pay television channel that broadcasts dance and urban music. It was launched on 3 December 2013.

== History ==
On 29 October 2013, MTV announced they had been working with Foxtel since early 2013 to offer more diversity on the Foxtel platform, as their two current music dedicated channels - MTV Classic and MTV Hits - fought for the same audience as Foxtel Networks channels Max and [V] Hits respectively. As such, it was decided that MTV Classic and MTV Hits would cease broadcasting on the Foxtel platform to be replaced by two new MTV channels. The channel to replace MTV Classic was MTV Dance, a channel dedicated to dance, hip hop, and R&B music from around the world - MTV's first channel to be dedicated to three different genres of music.

In February 2018, the channel was made available in HD (720p) on Fetch TV, becoming the first and only provider in Australia to do so.

On 1 July 2020, the channel rebranded as Club MTV, inline with its pan-European edition and UK & Ireland edition. The brand will also be extended to an uninterrupted, Stingray Music-powered Foxtel Tunes channel.

On 1 August 2023, Club MTV was replaced by the European version, sharing the same schedule, but 9 hours ahead.

== Logo ==
Logo used 3 December 2013 – 4 April 2017

Logo used 5 April 2017 - February 2018

Logo used February 2018 - 30 June 2020

Logo used 30 June 2020 - 14 September 2021

Logo used 14 September 2021 - 1 August 2023

Aus MTV Pop-up channel (November 2021)

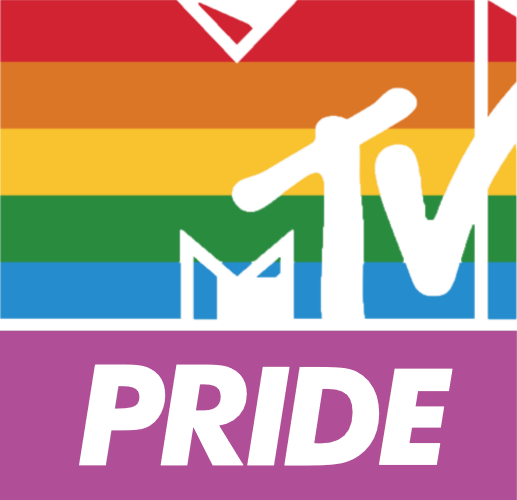
MTV Pride Pop-up channel (2015)

== Programming ==
- #UrbanTrending
- #waybackwednesday
- Backyard Bangers
- The After Party
- Club Classics
- Fresh Drops
- Going Up on a Tuesday
- Hip Hop & R'n'B Chart Top 20
- Hip Hop Hooray
- Hot 'n' Fresh
- Hot Right Now x15
- Late Night Urban
- Midnight Mix
- Ministry of Sound Official Top 20
- MTV Up Late
- Morning Rhythm
- Party Like It's...
- R&B Friday
- Retro Rage
- Rewind
- Saturday Warm Up
- Sunday Sessions
- Throwback Thursday
- Weekend Wind Down x50
- Weekend Workout

== See also ==
- Club MTV (British and Irish TV channel)
- Club MTV (European TV channel)
- MTV
- MTV Classic
- MTV Hits
- Nickelodeon
- Nick Jr.
