= MTV Classic (Australia) =

Australian television network

MTV Classic Australia
- Country: Australia
- Broadcast area: Australia, New Zealand

Programming
- Language: English
- Picture format: 576i (SDTV 16:9)

Ownership
- Owner: Paramount Networks UK & Australia; Paramount Networks Americas
- Sister channels: MTV; Club MTV; MTV Hits; CMT

History
- Launched: 14 March 2004 (Australia); 1 June 2011 (New Zealand)
- Replaced: MAX (Foxtel only)
- Closed: 1 July 2020; 6 years ago (New Zealand); 1 August 2023; 3 years ago (Australia)
- Replaced by: MTV 80s
- Former names: VH1 (2004–2010)

Links
- Website: mtv.com.au/mtv-classic

MTV Classic (formerly VH1 Australia) was an Australian and New Zealand subscription television music channel. The channel focused on music from the 1980s to 2000s. The channel first launched in Australia on 14 March 2004 (as VH1) and in New Zealand on 1 June 2011. On 1 July 2011 MTV International channels launched new logos.

On 1 April 2016 the channel closed in Australia and New Zealand but continued to air in Latin America and Brazil. The channel was ultimately revived on 27 February 2017 on the Fetch TV platform. It was later revived on Sky in December that year, and was relaunched on 1 July 2020 on Foxtel, replacing MAX.

The channel was replaced by MTV 80s in New Zealand on 1 July 2020, followed by Australia on 1 August 2023.

== History ==
=== As VH1 ===
The channel first aired on Sunday 14 March 2004 when Foxtel launched its digital product and then on Austar and Optus shortly after. In April 2006, Australian pay TV newcomer, SelecTV also began to carry VH1. In 2008 it began carriage on TransACT and Neighbourhood Cable. The channel although Australian run, mainly showed programming for the US and the UK with programs such as The Fabulous Life of... and the celebrity based documentary Driven. The VH1 Website officially launched on 3 August 2006. The website somewhat followed the format of the MTV Australia website. It contained a news section, competitions, features, info on new acts and more. It also has details on shows like Can't Get a Date. The website also provided an e-newsletter. The website was closed down in April 2007 for maintenance and was offline until November. In mid August 2009 the site was expanded from a single page to a mini-site on the MTV website.

On 25 November 2006 VH1 presented Australia's Favourite Lyric which presented a long list of songs on the VH1 website for viewers and industry members to vote. When the votes closed the list was made into a top 100 countdown and INXS took out the top spot with their song Never Tear Us Apart.

Unlike sister channel MTV, the channel still aired a majority of music programming, with VH1 produced entertainment programming shown on MTV or other channels.

=== Relaunch as MTV Classic ===
On 10 February 2010, the channel was announced via the MTV Australia website. MTV Networks in Australia confirmed that VH1 receives fewer viewers each week than its sister channel MTV Australia. Part of the channel's launch included a music event which took the place of the annual MTV Australia Awards which was held in Melbourne at the Palace Theatre. The event consisted of a line-up of local and international artists including former Guns N' Roses guitarist Slash. "Video Killed the Radio Star" by The Buggles was the first music video to be played on the channel.

The channel was made available on Australian IPTV service Fetch TV from launch in June 2010.

On 23 November 2010, MTV Classic began broadcasting in widescreen.

The channel launched in New Zealand on 1 June 2011 on Sky Television.

=== Cessation of Service on Foxtel ===
On 29 October 2013, MTV announced they had been working with Foxtel since early 2013 to offer more diversity on the Foxtel platform, as MTV Classic and MTV Hits fought for the same audience as Foxtel Networks channels MAX and [V] Hits respectively. The channel to replace MTV Classic is MTV Dance, a channel dedicated to dance, hip hop, and RnB music from around the world - MTV's first channel to be dedicated to three different genres of music. Although MTV Classic and MTV Hits will no longer be available on Foxtel, they will continue to be offered by Australian IPTV service Fetch TV and New Zealand pay TV provider Sky Television. The changes took place on 3 December 2013.

=== Closure of channel in New Zealand ===
On 1 December 2015, Sky Television replaced MTV Classic (and sister channel MTV Hits) with a localized version of MTV Music.

=== Closure ===
On 28 February 2016, Fetch TV (the last carrier of MTV Classic) announced via their Facebook page that the channel would close on 1 April 2016.

=== Revival and final closure ===
On 27 February 2017, MTV Classic was revived on the Fetch TV platform as a result of "popular demand". Available on channel 140, and exclusively on Fetch TV, the revived channel features rock, R&B and pop music from 1980 to 2000. Sky TV New Zealand would also re-add the channel on 8 December 2017. This was later replaced again on Sky by MTV 80s on 1 July 2020.

On 1 July 2020, MTV Classic returned to Foxtel on channel 804, replacing MAX, after a 7-year absence.

On 1 August 2023, MTV Classic was replaced by MTV 80s across Foxtel and FetchTV in Australia, as had been done in New Zealand 3 years prior.

== VJ's ==
When the Channel first launched (as VH1) it employed 2 on-air talent but they later began running on mainly voice overs and guest presenters, the 2 hosts were: Zoe Sheridan: the glamorous and sexy side of the project who assisted in the production to Inside Track and David Campbell: the son of Australian rock sensation Jimmy Barnes. David also had some chart success with his hit single "Hope" which sold well in Australia, the US and the UK, he also was one of the faces of Inside Track until its cancellation.

== Programming ==
MTV Classic airs a variety of artist related programmes as well as established MTV series. The channel aims at the age demographic of 24- to 40-year-olds.

=== Original programming (2010–2013) ===
- Behind the Music
- Celebrity Deathmatch
- Classic Albums
- Famous Crime Scene
- Greatest
- MTV Unplugged
- The Osbournes
- Storytellers
- That Metal Show

In addition to the above, the channel often screens music documentary and concert specials.

==== ARIA Hall of Fame ====
MTV Classic have the rights to The ARIA Hall of Fame Awards show (aired since 20 August 2006). The Hall of Fame has been an important part of the ARIA Awards since 1988. Traditionally taking place during the ARIA Awards ceremony, a diverse range of artists have been inducted into the Hall of Fame including AC/DC, Dame Joan Sutherland, Olivia Newton-John, Johnny O'Keefe, Paul Kelly, John Farnham, INXS, Slim Dusty, Jimmy Little and many more.

==== MTV Australia Video Music Awards ====
In March 2005 VH1 co-broadcast the MTV Australia Video Music Awards. As well as showing facts about the nominated artists, during this time, they also had a special award called the VH1 Music First Award which was awarded to Cher.

==== Inside Track ====
Inside Track featured new music and videos internationally and locally. So far the previous hosts have chatted with Jet, Darren Hayes, PJ Harvey, Lionel Richie, Olivia Newton-John and Chris Isaak.

- Countdown – VH1 aired full episode repeats and music clips of ABC's popular music show Countdown. The Countdown Special included live performances and interviews.
- The Greatest
- The Meldrum Tapes – A compilation of interviews from the archives of Molly Meldrum produced by the ABC, it began airing from February 2008.
- RocKwiz
- Top of the Pops – In August 2009 VH1 began screening a repackaged and compiled version of the long running UK music show

=== Programming after revival (2017–2023) ===
All of these programmes air without interruption. After the official revival in 2020, the schedule was refreshed to include programming blocks at set times throughout a large part of the day (aside from the countdowns). Programming line-up are almost entirely same as VH1 Classic Europe.

- 70s & 80s
- 90s & Noughties
- Classic Clock-Off
- Flashback Friday 100
- Good Morning Music
- Memory Lane
- Non-Stop Classics
- Party Mix
- Saturday Night Fever
- Snooze Sunday
- Sunday Sessions
- Superstar Spotlight
- Timeless Tunes
- Turn Back Time
- Windback Tracks
- Weekend Wake-Up
- Yesterday's Hits, Today

== Logo history ==
VH1 logo used 14 March 2004 – 30 April 2010

Original Logo used 1 May 2010 – 30 June 2011

Logo used 1 July 2011 – 30 September 2013

Logo used 1 October 2013 – 4 April 2017

Logo used 5 April 2017 – February 2018

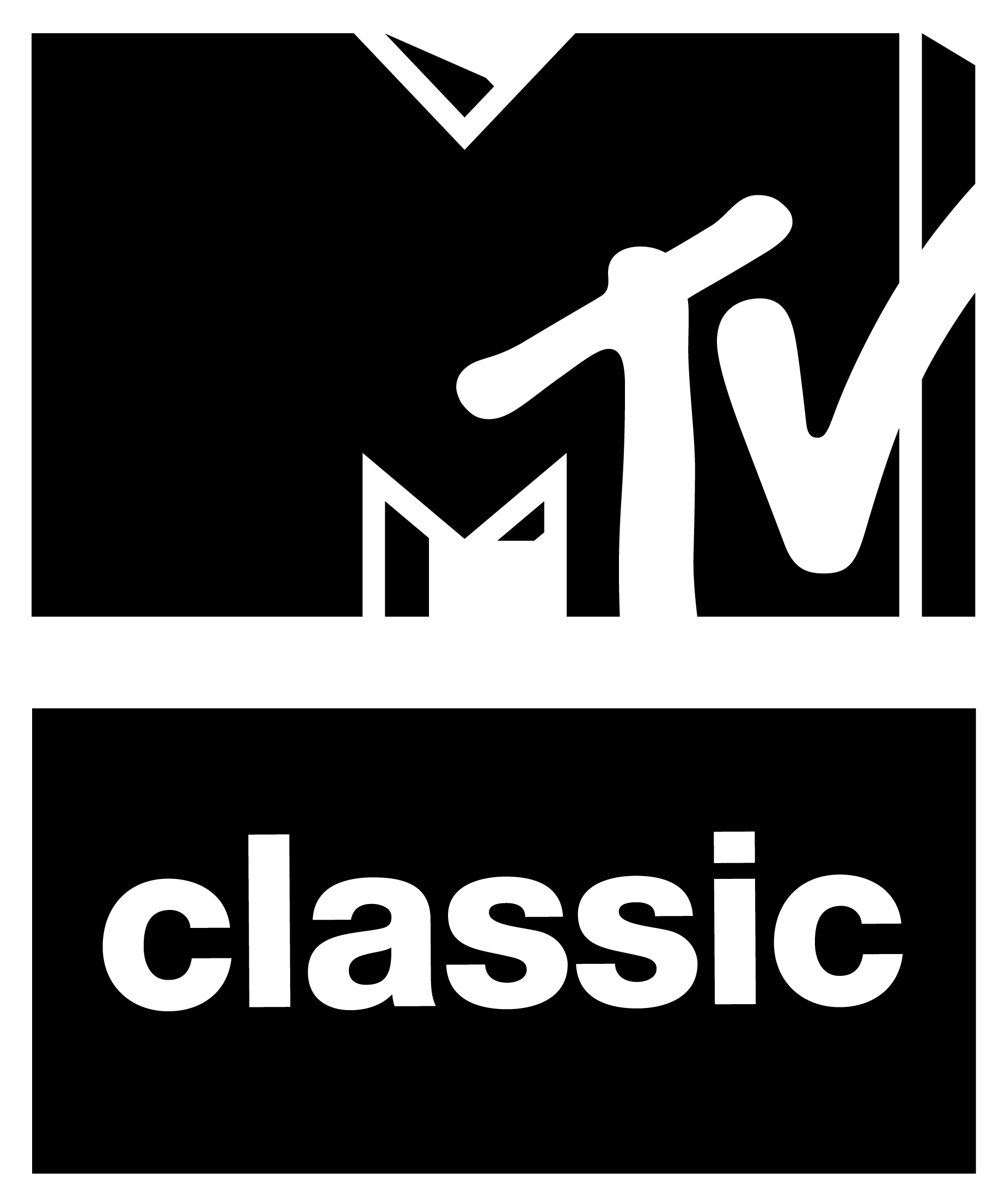
Logo used February 2018 – 14 September 2021

Final logo used 14 September 2021 – 1 August 2023

== See also ==
- MTV
- Club MTV
- MTV Hits
- MTV Music
- MTV Live
- Nickelodeon
- Nick Jr.
