= Nick Jr. (Australia & New Zealand) =

Defunct children's channel in Australia & New Zealand (1998-2025)

Nick Jr. Australia
- Country: Australia
- Broadcast area: Australia; New Zealand

Programming
- Languages: English; Māori
- Picture format: 576i (SDTV 16:9)

Ownership
- Owner: Paramount Networks UK & Australia
- Parent: Nickelodeon Group
- Sister channels: Network 10; 10 HD; 10 Drama; 10 Comedy; MTV; Club MTV; MTV Classic; MTV Hits; Nickelodeon (pay TV); Nickelodeon (free-to-air); NickMusic; Comedy Central

History
- Launched: 9 January 1998 (block); 14 March 2004 (channel)
- Closed: 1 November 2025; 12 months ago (Australia); 2 December 2025; 11 months ago (New Zealand)
- Replaced by: Nickelodeon (Australia); Sky Kids (New Zealand)

Links
- Website: www.nickjr.com.au

Availability

Streaming media
- Fetch Mobi (AU): Channel 253
- Sky Go (NZ): skygo.co.nz

Nick Jr. was a 24-hour children's pay television channel in Australia and New Zealand targeted at preschoolers. Before the channel's launch, Nick Jr. was a morning programming block on Nickelodeon until 2004, when Foxtel as a local feed of its American counterpart, launched it as a full 24-hour children's channel. The channel is owned by Paramount Networks UK & Australia, and was also available on Optus Television.

== History ==
logo used from 2007 to 2010

Before Nick Jr. officially launched as a 24-hour television channel, it was part of Nickelodeon's morning line-up which included such shows as Blue's Clues, Dora the Explorer, Go, Diego, Go!, Yo Gabba Gabba!, Pingu, and Peppa Pig the block itself was also joined by a presenter known as "Face", which presented the Australian-input from 1998 until 2006, the Australian-input was also the last of the Nick Jr. brands internationally to have Face being replaced.

On 21 January 2004, Foxtel announced a brand new digital service along with new channel line-ups which included Nick Jr. On 14 March 2004, Nick Jr. officially launched to be the first 24-hour Australian children's channel to air mostly preschool shows.

For a few months after Nick Jr. became a full channel, it kept a two-hour time slot on Nickelodeon in the mornings from 8:00am until 10:00am, but the time allocated to the block was far shorter than it was before it became a full channel.

The channel introduced some original short-form programming, including Cooking for Kids with Luis and Gardening for Kids with Madi.

The channel was rebranded on 26 March 2010. From 2004 until 2010, the channel used a localised logo with two kangaroos with the tradition of "Nick" (representing the adult) and "Jr." (as the child).

During the time Nickelodeon had a separate channel in New Zealand, it had a Nick Jr. block running from 9:30 am to 2 pm from Monday to Wednesday, 9:30 am to 2:30 pm on Thursday and Friday and 6:30 am to 8 am on weekends. After the closure of the New Zealand feed, the Australian feed of Nick Jr. launched in New Zealand on 24 December 2010.

On 3 December 2013, Nick Jr. became available on Foxtel's streaming service Foxtel Go.

On 1 January 2014, Nick Jr. launched on Australian IPTV provider Fetch TV.

The channel also aired as a two-hour block in the afternoons on Sky Television in New Zealand between 4-6 weekdays, until this ended in 2013.

On 1 August 2023, Nick Jr. was removed from Foxtel following an announcement that 10 Shake would rebrand as Nickelodeon on the same day, with selected programmes being shifted to that channel and was replaced by Nick Jr. Global. Fetch TV continues to broadcast the channel in Australia, and a variant of the channel is offered as a FAST channel on 10Play.

The channel was removed on Fetch TV on 1 November 2025.

The channel was withdrawn in New Zealand from 2 December 2025, ultimately shutting down the channel completely. The final programme to air was Paw Patrol.

== Logos ==

Logo used from 2007 to 2010 with two Kangaroos, the national animal of Australia.

== See also ==
- Nick Jr. Channel (American counterpart)
- Nickelodeon (United States)
- Nickelodeon (Australia and New Zealand)
