= MTV Hits (Australia and New Zealand) =

MTV Hits Australia & New Zealand
- Final logo from 2021 to 2023.
- Country: Australia; New Zealand
- Broadcast area: Australia; New Zealand
- Network: MTV

Programming
- Language: English
- Picture format: 1080i (HDTV); 576i (SDTV 16:9)
- Timeshift service: MTV Hits +2

Ownership
- Owner: Paramount Networks UK & Australia; ZIPPLAY Media Rights Ltd.
- Sister channels: MTV; Club MTV; MTV 80s CMT; MTV Live

History
- Launched: Original; 1 April 2007; 18 years ago (Australia); 1 December 2011; 14 years ago (New Zealand); Relaunch; 1 July 2020; 5 years ago
- Replaced: MTV Music (Relaunch)
- Closed: Original; 1 January 2014; 12 years ago (Australia); 1 December 2015; 10 years ago (New Zealand); Relaunch; 1 August 2023; 2 years ago (Australia); September 2023; 2 years ago (New Zealand)
- Replaced by: MTV Music (original); MTV Hits Europe
- Former names: TMF (prior to 1 November 2010)

Availability

Streaming media
- Foxtel Go Screenplay TV: Channel 801; Channel 608
- Fetch Mobi: Channel 237

MTV Hits was an Australian and New Zealand subscription music channel focused on hit music. The channel first launched in Australia in April 2007 (as The Music Factory), and later launched in New Zealand on 1 December 2011.

The channel closed on 1 December 2015 to be replaced in all markets by MTV Music, but was revived 5 years later on 1 July 2020 as a rebrand of MTV Music.

== History ==
MTV Hits Australia & Hits first launched as TMF Australia in April 2007 on the Optus Television pay TV service and allowed viewers to interact with the channel via the web and mobile (3G Network) commencing on 22 June 2007. Unlike sister channel MTV, the channel only played music related programming. The channel was said to be picked up by cable TV providers Foxtel and Austar as a standalone channel soon, but was available via the interactive My MTV Service.

=== Relaunch as MTV Hits ===
TMF was relaunched as MTV Hits on 1 November 2010. The channel later launched in New Zealand on Sky Television on 1 December 2011.

On 1 July 2011, MTV International channels launched new logos.

=== Cessation of service in Australia ===
On 29 October 2013, MTV announced they had been working with Foxtel since early 2013 to offer more diversity on the Foxtel platform, as MTV Classic and MTV Hits fought for the same audience as Foxtel Networks channels MAX and [V] Hits respectively. The channel to replace MTV Hits is MTV Music, the number one UK music channel, which will feature Pop, Rock, urban and alternative music. Although MTV Classic and MTV Hits will no longer be available on Foxtel, they will continue to be offered by Australian IPTV service Fetch TV and New Zealand pay TV provider Sky Television. The changes took place on 3 December 2013.

On 16 December 2013, FetchTV announced via their Facebook page that as of 1 January 2014, MTV Music would replace MTV Hits on their service, as was done by Foxtel the month earlier. This meant that MTV Hits would become exclusively available in New Zealand.

=== Closure of channel in New Zealand ===
On 1 December 2015, Sky Television replaced MTV Hits (and sister channel MTV Classic) with a localized version of MTV Music. Ultimately, this resulted in the closure of the channel, as Sky was the last remaining provider of MTV Hits.

=== Revival ===
On 1 July 2020, the channel returned to Foxtel channel 801, taking the slot of Channel [V] and replacing MTV Music, alongside Fetch TV and Sky (New Zealand).

On 1 August 2023, MTV Hits was replaced by the European version in Australia, sharing the same schedule but 9 hours ahead. New Zealand retained the local version until early September.

== Programming ==
=== Current shows (2020–2023) ===
- After Hours
- After Party
- Best of the Week: Top 30
- Billboard Chart
- The Evolution of...
- Fresh Finds by MTV
- Hip Hop x RnB Party
- Hottest Right Now
- Local Finds by MTV
- Mornings on MTV
- Most Shazammed: Top 30
- Most Streamed Songs
- MTV House Party
- MTV Upload
- Official Global Chart
- Trending Right Now
- Up Late on MTV
- VEVO Certified 2011
- Wake Up with MTV
- Weekend Vibes Only

=== Previous programmes ===
- #Hits – Music videos are played out while viewers' answer to questions posted on MTV Hits' Facebook and Twitter accounts.
- ...vs... – Songs are played by two different artists, One Direction vs. Justin Bieber, for example
- 10 Biggest Tracks Right Now – The top 10 songs in the country
- 30 Biggest Tracks Right Now – The top 30 songs in the country
- Brekkie Hits – Songs played in the early hours
- Burst of... – A few songs of a certain artist is played. The artist's name is also in the title, Burst Of...Timomatic, for example
- Double Play – 2 songs, of a certain artist, back-to-back are played
- Fresh Vid – Newest video by a certain artist. The artist's name is also in the title, Fresh Vid: Reece Mastin, for example
- MTV Download Charts – Songs played according to the download charts
- MTV Hits Top 30 – The top 30 songs in the country
- MTV News – The news as told by MTV
- My Pix – Music videos are played while viewers' answers to questions are shown
- Nothing but MTV Hits – Songs played at nighttime
- Pop Hits Top 6 – The top 6 pop songs in the country
- Today's Most Wanted – Music played as voted by viewers on the MTV website
- U Control – Music chosen by a single viewer
- Urban Hits Top 6 – The top 6 urban songs in the country

=== TMF shows ===
- Booty Beats
- Daily Downloads
- Eye Candy
- Fresh New Ones
- Snitch and Bitch
- Study Free Zone
- TMF Top 20 Download
- TMF X2
- Top 20 Theme:
  - Top 20 Australian Charts
  - Top 20 Pop
  - Top 20 Rock
  - Top 20 Urban
- Top 6 at 6
- Ultimate Top 100
- Vidcast – Videos that are created by viewers on mobile phones and are aired on the show.

== Logos ==
TMF Logo used April 2007 – 1 November 2010

MTV Hits Logo used 1 November 2010 – 30 June 2011

MTV Hits Logo used 1 July 2011 – 30 September 2013

MTV Hits Logo used 1 October 2013 – 1 December 2015

MTV Hits Logo used from 1 July 2020 – 14 September 2021

MTV Hits Logo used 14 September 2021 - 1 August 2023 (Australia) 14 September 2021 -September 2023 (New Zealand)
