= Odyssey Channel =

- Odyssey Channel Logo
- Network: Optus Vision

Programming
- Picture format: PAL

Ownership
- Owner: Optus Vision

History
- Launched: 1 July 1997
- Closed: 31 March 2004

The Odyssey Channel was a documentary channel that was previously available on Optus Vision in Australia. It was one of the few channels on pay TV in Australia that had a large amount of Australian content available.

Due to the CSA (Content Sharing Agreement) between Optus and Foxtel, it was closed in 2004. Foxtel would not allow it on their platform due to it competing with their license of the Discovery Channel brand, and Optus decided it could no longer fund it.

== Programming ==
The programming covered eight genres:

- Issues
- History
- People and Places
- Science and Technology
- Popular Culture
- Nature
- Arts and Entertainment
- Lifestyle
- NOVA

Some content shown on the channel was sourced from the American and Canadian television network Home & Garden Television (HGTV).
