= LocalVision =

- Country: Australia
- Broadcast area: Brisbane; Melbourne; Sydney

Ownership
- Owner: Optus Vision

History
- Launched: March 1996
- Closed: 1998

LocalVision was a group of community access channels that broadcast on the Optus Vision cable television service.
