= Binge (TV channel) =

Australian TV channel

- Country: Australia

Programming
- Language: English

Ownership
- Owner: Foxtel
- Sister channels: Foxtel Networks channels

History
- Launched: 5 October 2016
- Replaced: SoHo
- Closed: 7 November 2019
- Replaced by: Fox One; Binge (streaming service)

Availability

Streaming media
- Foxtel Go: Channel 119

Binge (stylized as Binge.) was an Australian 24-hour pay television channel available on the Foxtel platform. Originally scheduled to launch on 1 October 2016, the channel instead launched on 5 October 2016. The channel, similar to sister channel BoxSets, broadcast multiple episodes of drama and comedy programs, allowing viewers to binge-watch a series. Binge was part of the drama pack on channel 119.

The channel was closed on 7 November 2019, and then replaced by Fox One.

== History ==
The channel was announced on 1 August 2016 as a replacement for SoHo, which would be closed at the same time. Existing programs on SoHo would be migrated to other Foxtel channels, including showcase, TV H!TS, Arena and FOX8.

The first program to air was the entire first season of Supergirl.

On 7 November 2019, the channel ceased operations, after which the channel space created in 1995 by FX ceased to exist.

It was revealed on 23 May 2020 that Foxtel had repurposed the brand for a brand new streaming service named BINGE, which would act as a direct competitor to streaming video-on-demand services like Netflix and Stan.

== Programming ==
Programming on Binge was aimed at the 18-49 and 25-54 demographic groups.

== Availability ==
The channel was only available through the Foxtel platform on channel 119 (originally channel 116).
