= My First Gig =

- Genre: Music; Talk
- Presented by: Jimmy Barnes
- Narrated by: Clare Bowditch
- Country of origin: Australia
- Original language: English
- No. of seasons: 1
- No. of episodes: 10

Production
- Running time: 30 minutes (including commercials)

Original release
- Network: MAX
- Release: 13 April – 15 June 2009

My First Gig is an Australian music television series that first aired on MAX on Monday, 13 April 2009 at 9:30pm.

The show is presented by Australian singer Jimmy Barnes, who interviews artists who have had a major impact on Australian music about their influences and events of their careers, as well as reflecting on their earliest performances. The ten-part series was filmed at Barnes' home and includes a duet between Barnes and the guest at the end of each episode. The series is narrated by Clare Bowditch.

== Episodes ==
- Episode 1 – Neil Finn (13 April 2009)
- Episode 2 – Mark Seymour (20 April 2009)
- Episode 3 – Peter Garrett (27 April 2009)
- Episode 4 – Marcia Hines (4 May 2009)
- Episode 5 – Tex Perkins (11 May 2009)
- Episode 6 – Diesel (18 May 2009)
- Episode 7 – Richard Clapton (25 May 2009)
- Episode 8 – Joe Camilleri (1 June 2009)
- Episode 9 – Stephen Cummings (8 June 2009)
- Episode 10 – Ross Wilson (15 June 2009)
