= Foxtel Smooth =

- Country: Australia
- Broadcast area: Australia

Programming
- Language: English
- Picture format: 576i (SDTV 16:9)

Ownership
- Owner: Foxtel; Nova Entertainment
- Sister channels: Foxtel Networks channels

History
- Launched: 3 December 2013
- Closed: 1 July 2020
- Replaced by: Foxtel Arts (24 hour channel)

Availability

Streaming media
- Foxtel: Channel 806

Foxtel Smooth (formerly Smooth) was an 18-hour (originally 24-hour) Australian pay television music channel available via Foxtel satellite and cable services. It launched on 3 December 2013, dedicated to easy listening adult contemporary music. The channel ceased broadcasting on 1 July 2020.

== History ==
Original logo used when the channel was branded simply as Smooth. As with the current logo, it uses the same style as that used by the radio network.

On 1 November 2013, Foxtel announced they were refreshing their music genre channels to allow for more diversity in their offerings. In addition to changes to the channels being offered by MTV Australia and the branding of the audio channels, it was announced that Smooth FM would launch a television station that would offer easy listening adult contemporary music which will correspond to their radio network. Smooth was the first radio station in Australia to launch a television channel. Marcia Hines and Cameron Daddo were the faces of the channel.

From 11 October 2017, it was announced that Foxtel Smooth would become a part-day channel, and would only be broadcast between midnight and 6 pm. This was due to a move by Foxtel to enable Foxtel Smooth to share the same broadcast bandwidth as Foxtel Arts, which in turn would only be available between 6 pm and midnight.

On 3 June 2020, it was confirmed by Foxtel and NOVA that the channel would cease operations at the end of the month. This was followed with an announcement in May that Foxtel would be outsourcing its music video channel operations to Network 10's parent company ViacomCBS (now known as Paramount Networks UK & Australia). On 1 July 2020, following the closure of the channel, Foxtel Arts was reverted to a 24-hour channel.
