= Foxtel Arts =

Defunct Australian subscription channel

- Country: Australia

Programming
- Language: English
- Picture format: 1080i (HDTV 16:9)

Ownership
- Owner: Foxtel Networks
- Sister channels: Foxtel Networks channels

History
- Launched: 28 March 2015
- Replaced: Studio (2015); Foxtel Smooth (2020)
- Closed: 1 September 2021; 5 years ago
- Replaced by: Famous

Availability

Streaming media
- Foxtel Go: Channel 133 & 806

Foxtel Arts was a subscription television arts channel available in Australia on the Foxtel platform.

== History ==
Foxtel Arts replaced the SBS owned arts channel Studio, and became the third iteration of a dedicated arts channel on Foxtel in six years. The Foxtel owned and operated channel launched at 10am AEST on 28 March 2015. Part of the reason for launching the channel was to give Foxtel the ability to pitch programming to viewers aged over 55, a demographic the service began to pursue in 2014. In addition, the launch came at a time when Foxtel sought to bring more channels 'in-house' in order to obtain more exclusive content deals to increase their competitiveness with new streaming services such as Netflix and Stan.

From 11 October 2017, Foxtel Arts became a part-day channel, and was only broadcast between 6pm and midnight. This was due to a move by Foxtel to enable Foxtel Arts to share the same broadcast bandwidth as Foxtel Smooth, which was in turn only available between midnight and 6pm. It was then reverted to a 24-hour channel on 1 July 2020, following Foxtel Smooth's closure.

On 1 September 2021, the channel was closed down and replaced by FOX Docos on channel 129 on both Foxtel and the streaming service BINGE.

== Programming ==
The channel's first local commission was the film and television review program Screen, hosted by Margaret Pomeranz and Graeme Blundell, which premiered on 2 April 2015. The series was renewed in 2018, and as of 2021, the series is ongoing. Past episodes are uploaded to YouTube.

Regular programming included programming featuring or related to opera, ballet, music, theatre, dance, classical and contemporary performance, as well as documentary specials and series from cinema, literature, visual art and artists.
