= MTV's The Lair =

Australian television show

- Starring: Darren McMullen
- Country of origin: Australia
- No. of seasons: 2
- No. of episodes: 10

Production
- Running time: 60 minutes

Original release
- Network: MTV Australia
- Release: 26 January 2007 – present

MTV The Lair is a live television show that aired on MTV Australia that showcases unsigned and breaking artists as well as high-profile international acts.

== History ==
It was announced at the end of 2006 that MTV would launch a new live show in 2007 called MTV's The Lair which would air live every Thursday at The Metro Theatre in Sydney. The show launched on 26 January 2007.

== Season 1 ==
=== Episode 1 ===
26 January 2007

==== The Lair Foreplay ====
- Jet
- Kasabian
- My Chemical Romance

==== The Lair (Live Show) ====
- Peaches
- Wolf & Cub
- Spank Rock

=== Episode 2 ===
1 February 2007

- Die! Die! Die!
- Dappled Cities Fly
- Pomomofo
- The Tongue
- Little Birdy

=== Episode 3 (Special Episode) ===
8 February 2007

- Evanescence

=== Episode 4 ===
15 February 2007

- Something for Kate
- Children Collide
- Bliss n Eso
- Fait Accompli

=== Episode 5 ===
22 February 2007

- Juliette Lewis and the Licks
- Behind Crimson Eyes
- Expatriate
- Bob Log III

== Season 2 ==
=== Episode 1 ===
19 June 2008

- Shihad
- Operator Please
- Dangerous!
- Catcall

=== Episode 2 ===
26 June 2008

- The Mess Hall
- Youth Group
- Van She
- Snob Scrilla

=== Episode 3 ===
3 July 2008

=== Episode 4 (special episode) ===
10 July 2008

- Cypress Hill

=== Episode 5 ===
17 July 2008

- The Grates
- Cog
- Killaqueenz
- The Sweatshop Boys
- Streetparty

== See also ==
- List of Australian music television shows
