= SelecTV (Australian television) =

Australian satellite based subscription television service

- Type: Subsidiary
- Industry: Pay tv
- Founded: October 2005
- Founder: Jim Blomfield
- Defunct: January 2011
- Fate: Under administration
- Headquarters: Melbourne, Australia
- Area served: Australia wide
- Owner: Bruce Gordon
- Parent: WIN Corporation

SelecTV was an Australian satellite based subscription television broadcasting service. In January 2011, the service ceased operations. Services were carried on the Intelsat 8 satellite.

== History ==
SelecTV was created in Melbourne in October 2003 by Jim Blomfield, a former chief executive officer of Foxtel, as i-view Broadcasting Pty, Ltd. It underwent multiple name changes, before finally being renamed as SelecTV Broadcasting Limited in October 2005. The companies focus was to provide comparatively low-cost premium content to specialist market segments, including Australians whose first language was other than English and retirees. In August 2006, WIN Corporation purchased 50.1% of the company for $23 million, acquiring overall company control. By April 2006, the company said it had approximately 2,000 subscribers. WIN Corporation saw opportunity in the companies rapid expansion, and direct competition to the Australian subscription television giant Foxtel, acquiring the remaining 49.9% from Access Providers in October 2006. The company expanded its programming to over 40 television channels consisting of English-language channels, as well as various programming packages comprising foreign-language and special interest channels in Greek, Spanish, Italian, German, and Vietnamese. By 2009, due to low subscription to their language packages, SelecTV discontinued all German and Vietnamese programming.

By June 2010, the company had approximately 45,000 subscribers, well short of its target of 80,000. Despite expanding their English language services, SelecTV failed to meet subscriber targets. In August 2010, it was reported that the company would cease broadcasting English programming by 15 November 2010. On 20 August 2010, SelecTV signed an agreement allowing its 22,000 English subscribers to voluntarily change to Foxtel and Austar's subscription services without additional charges. On 30 August 2010, SelecTV sold their Italian language programming to World Media International and in October their Spanish language programming to UBI World TV.

In its final days, SelecTV provided subscription packages for Greek programming. On 4 February 2011 SelecTV went into voluntary administration. On 7 February 2011 a creditors meeting was held where the company revealed that it was in debt of $26 million. The subscription service is no longer available in Australia.

== Former channels ==
- Animal Planet
- BBC World News
- Bloomberg Television
- Canal Sur
- Cartoon Network
- CNN
- Deutsche Welle (DW-TV, German)
- Discovery Home & Health
- Discovery Science
- Discovery Turbo
- Disney Channel
- E!
- Euronews (in Italian, German, Spanish and English)
- Eurosport Asia Pacific
- Fashion TV
- Latele Novela Network
- Leonardo World
- Movie Network Channels (Movie One, Movie Two, Movie Extra, Movie Greats)
- MTV
- MTV Classic
- National Geographic Adventure
- National Geographic Channel
- OutTV
- Ovation Channel
- Playhouse Disney
- Rai Italia
- Real Madrid TV
- SBTN (Vietnamese)
- Sky Racing
- Televisión Española (TVE)
- TLC
- Turner Classic Movies
- TV Chile
- VTV Uruguay
- Weatherzone
- Wine TV (in English and German)

== See also ==
- Subscription television in Australia
