= BoxSets =

Australian pay television channel

- BoxSets Logo
- Country: Australia

Programming
- Language: English
- Picture format: 1080i (16:9 HDTV)

Ownership
- Owner: Foxtel Networks
- Sister channels: Foxtel Networks channels

History
- Launched: 3 November 2014

Availability

Streaming media
- Foxtel Go: Channel 150
- Binge: binge.com.au

BoxSets is an Australian pay television channel, screening marathons of hit drama and comedy programming akin to boxsets. The channel launched on Foxtel on 3 November 2014.

== History ==
On 4 September 2014, Foxtel announced that on 3 November 2014 they would launch a new channel entitled BoxSets which would feature box sets of successful and popular TV series. The channel would be available as both a linear channel and a video on demand service (available through internet-connected Foxtel set top boxes and through Foxtel's streaming app Foxtel Go). The news came as Foxtel faced increased competition from IPTV services (namely Netflix) and the increasing prevalence of binge-watching among viewers.

Later that month, it was announced that Joanna Lumley had been signed to produce advertisements for BoxSets. The ad design was identical to that used by sister company Sky UK for their On Demand service, which has a similar premise to BoxSets.

Following the success of BoxSets, Foxtel launched a second whole seasons channel, Binge, in October 2016. BoxSets was then moved to channel 115, while Binge launched on channel 116.

== Programming ==
Note: Programming availability may vary between the linear channel and video on demand service.

- Absolutely Fabulous (seasons 1–5)
- Angels in America
- Band of Brothers
- Big Love (seasons 1–5)
- Boardwalk Empire (seasons 1–5)
- Devil's Playground
- Entourage (seasons 1–5)
- Game of Thrones (seasons 1–4)
- Getting On
- Girls (season 1–3)
- Looking (season 1)
- Luck (season 1)
- Morden (season 1)
- The Newsroom (seasons 1–2)
- The Pacific
- Rome (seasons 1–2)
- The Sopranos (seasons 1–6)
- True Blood (seasons 1–7)
- Wentworth (seasons 1–2)
