= Famous (TV channel) =

Australian pay TV channel

- Country: Australia

Programming
- Language(s): English
- Picture format: 1080i (HDTV 16:9)

Ownership
- Owner: Foxtel Networks
- Sister channels: Foxtel Networks channels

History
- Launched: 1 September 2021
- Replaced: Foxtel Arts
- Closed: 26 August 2025; 27 days ago
- Former names: FOX Docos (2021–2023); Docos (2023–2024)

Availability

Streaming media
- Foxtel Go: Channel 129 & 283
- Binge: binge.com.au

Famous was an Australian subscription television channel which focused on broadcasting various documentary films and docuseries. The channel launched on 1 September 2021 as Fox Docos, serving as a replacement for Foxtel Arts. It rebranded twice, with it simply known as Docos from 26 September 2023, then Famous from 1 August 2024. The channel closed down on 26 August 2025, with programming moving to other Foxtel Networks channels.

== Programming ==
The channel consisted of both acquired and original programming, including celebrity, entertainment and sports documentaries and non-fiction content from HBO. The first local program to be produced for the channel, Walking with Hope, premiered on 2 September 2021, one day after the channel's launch.
