= Wine TV =

Television channel

- Wine TV logo from 2004-2009
- Country: United States
- Broadcast area: United Kingdom, Europe, Asia, Oceania
- Headquarters: San Francisco, California

Programming
- Language: Various

Ownership
- Owner: Wine Network Inc.

History
- Launched: 17 September 2004
- Founder: Patrick Brunet; Lorie Kim
- Closed: January 2009

Wine TV or Wine Network was an independently owned and operated digital cable & satellite television channel that aired programming about wine and spirits. It was the only such channel in the world featuring programming dedicated to wine lovers including shows about winemaking, wine growing, wine selection, cooking with wine, and many others. It also focused on wine culture with topics such as cigars, travel, fashion, entertainment and art & culture.

== Background ==
When Wine TV launched on September 17, 2004, it was unable to secure a carriage deal with any provider in the United States. The decision was made to launch the channel internationally where it had been quite successful. Wine TV secured distribution in 22 countries on four continents, including Germany - where it was known as Wein TV - on Kabel Deutschland, ish TV & Primacom (IPTV), Portugal, the UK and Ireland - on the Sky Digital platform where it went by the name Wine TV - and Russia, among others.

In Australia, Selectv offered this channel until September 8, 2008. The German and British version ceased broadcasting in late January 2009. In the Philippines, the channel was available in SkyCable.

== Programming ==
Wine TV featured a wide array of programming covering many different aspects of wine culture and the wine industry. Among the programs aired on Wine TV include:

- The Wine Route - A series exploring various acclaimed Wine regions around the world.
- Wine 101 - A program designed to educate viewers on world of wine, with trips to various wine regions in France, Germany, Italy, Portugal & the United States.
- A Taste Of Brittany - A cooking show that gives viewers a look at the wine and cuisine of Brittany region in France.
- Off the Vine - A behind-the-scenes look at the Australian wine industry.
- Wine Television - A lifestyle program that combines stories about wine with tales of travel and good food.
