= Foxtel One =

Australian subscription television channel

- Country: Australia
- Broadcast area: Australia

Programming
- Language: English
- Picture format: 576i (16:9 SDTV); 1080i (16:9 HDTV)
- Timeshift service: Foxtel One +2

Ownership
- Owner: Foxtel Networks
- Sister channels: Foxtel Networks channels

History
- Launched: 7 November 2019
- Former names: FOX One (2019–2023)

Availability

Streaming media
- Foxtel Go: Channel 101
- Binge: binge.com.au

Logo used 7 November 2019 – 28 September 2023

Foxtel One (formerly Fox One) is an Australian subscription television channel that focuses on non-premium dramas. The channel launched on 7 November 2019 as FOX One.

On 28 September 2023, the channel rebranded as Foxtel One.

== Programing ==
=== Current programing ===
- Blue Bloods
- The Cleaning Lady (until June 2025)
- The Blacklist
- S.W.A.T.
- Hawaii Five-O
- Rizzoli & Isles
- Motive
- Leverage
- Murder, She Wrote
- Bull
- FBI: Most Wanted
- Law & Order
- Law & Order Toronto: Criminal Intent
- Jeopardy!
- Found (until June 2025)
- The Pitt (season 1 only)
- Rescue: HI-Surf (until May 2024)
- The Irrational
- The Brokenwood Mysteries
- The Young and the Restless (2020–present)

=== Former programing ===
- Days of Our Lives (2020–2024, Now on 10 and 10Play)
