= Country Music Channel =

Australian music TV channel

- Country: Australia

Programming
- Language: English

Ownership
- Owner: Nightlife Australia
- Sister channels: Foxtel Networks channels

History
- Launched: February 2004; 21 years ago (original); 1 July 2025; 4 months ago (relaunch)
- Replaced: CMT Australia (relaunch)
- Closed: 1 July 2020; 5 years ago (original)
- Replaced by: CMT Australia (original)

Availability

Streaming media
- Foxtel Go: Channel 805

Country Music Channel (CMC) is an Australian cable and satellite music television channel owned and operated by Foxtel Networks. It was the only country music video channel in Australia, created after the departure of MusicCountry from the Australian market.

Country Music Channel ceased operations at the end of June 2020, and was replaced by a regional version of CMT (owned by Network 10 parent company Paramount Networks UK & Australia).

However, in July 2025, the channel relaunched, alongside Max, in Foxtel's new music channel relaunch in partnership with NightLife Australia.

== Former CMC-era programming ==
- The CMC Top 30 Countdown - weekly chart based on airplay
- Spotlight, one-hour collection of videos from a single artist.
- 30 Best - themed countdown.
- Headline Country
- The Wilkinsons (TV series)
- Tuckerville
- Rollin' With... - an artist profile show host by Steve Forde. artists profiled include Lee Kernaghan, Catherine Britt, Adam Brand, Troy Cassar-Daley, Joe Nichols, Dierks Bentley, Corb Lund Band, Blaine Larsen, Miranda Lambert, Jack Ingram, Colt Ford and The Wilkinsons
- Muster Masters - a game show hosted based around the Gympie Muster (2009)

=== Talent ===
- Steve Forde (Rollin' with...)
- The Sunny Cowgirls (Muster Masters, CMC Rocks the Hunter)
- Morgan Evans

=== Live events ===
CMC co-produced a three-day music festival, with Rob Potts Entertainment Edge and Michael Chugg Entertainment - CMC Rocks.

- The first three years the event took place in Thredbo.
- In 2008, CMC Rocks the Snowys featured Mia Dyson, Brian Cadd, John Butler Trio, Shea Fisher, The McClymonts, Jim Lauderdale, Catherine Britt, Steve Forde, Adam Harvey, Shannon Noll, Sugarland, Gary Allan, and Patty Griffin.
- In 2009, CMC Rocks the Snowys featured Corb Lund and the Hurtin' Albertans, Steve Forde, Captain Flange, Taylor Swift, Joe Nichols, Old Crow Medicine Show, John Williamson, Pete Murray, The Waifs, The Sunny Cowgirls, Ash Grunwald, The Audreys, Jasmine Rae, and Deana Carter.
- In 2010, CMC Rocks the Snowys featured Adam Harvey, Nanci Griffith, Tania Kernaghan, Steve Forde, Phil Vassar, Jack Ingram, Lee Kernaghan.
- In 2011, the event moved to the Hunter Valley of New South Wales and featured Troy Cassar-Daley, Russell Morris, Alan Jackson, Joe Nichols, Emerson Drive, Dean Brody.

In partnership with parent company Foxtel, CMC hosted its own awards program which it airs live. The CMC Awards took place on the night until CMC Rocks officially starts.
