= Tuckerville =

- Genre: Reality
- Starring: Tanya Tucker
- Country of origin: United States
- Original language: English
- No. of seasons: 2
- No. of episodes: 26

Original release
- Network: TLC
- Release: October 22, 2005 – May 27, 2006

Tuckerville is an American reality television series that aired on TLC in 2005. It is about the life of American country music artist Tanya Tucker and her three children; Presley, Grayson, and Layla. The show took place in Tucker's mansion outside Nashville, Tennessee. The program aired on Saturdays at 10:00 PM and 9:00 PM central time. Following the show's cancellation, Tucker told Billboard magazine that six new shows were filmed and they were shopping for networks. However, no follow-up program was picked up.
