= MTV (Australia and New Zealand) =

Entertainment television channel

MTV Australia
- Final logo used from 14 September 2021 to 1 August 2023
- Country: Australia
- Broadcast area: Australia, New Zealand

Programming
- Language: English
- Picture format: 576i (SDTV 16:9, 4:3); 720p (HDTV 16:9)

Ownership
- Owner: Paramount Networks UK & Australia
- Sister channels: Club MTV; MTV Hits; MTV 80s CMT

History
- Launched: 14 June 1996; 30 years ago
- Closed: 1 August 2023; 3 years ago (Australia & New Zealand)
- Replaced by: MTV Global
- Former names: ARC Music Channel (prior to 20 March 1997)

Links
- Website: www.mtv.com.au

Availability

Streaming media
- Fetch Mobi (AU): Channel 104
- Sky Go (NZ): skygo.co.nz

MTV was a 24-hour general entertainment channel specialising in music and youth culture programming which served Australia and New Zealand. Paramount Networks UK & Australia, headquartered in London with a local office at Network 10's headquarters in Sydney, is responsible for marketing and advertising in Australia and New Zealand. The channel was replaced by MTV Global in August 2023.

== History ==
=== MTV on the Nine Network ===
The "MTV" brand was launched in Australia during April 1987 as a music program that aired late on Friday and Saturday nights for its full six-year run on the free-to-air Nine Network. The program was hosted by Richard Wilkins and Joy Smithers with music news from Alison Drower. Its competitors at the time were ABC TV's Rage (which also started in April 1987) and Network Ten's Video Hits (which started in February 1987).

MTV Australia's focus was predominantly on Australian, British, Canadian and American artists, and the program rarely played other forms of rock and pop music. The program presented a mixture of music videos, interviews and segments, and depended heavily on imported US content. In its early years it also showed the MTV USA game show Remote Control.

The program was discontinued in 1993 when Nine chose not to renew the licence with Viacom. Nine said the axing was due to high production and licensing costs. Saul Shtein brought MTV to Australia with Richard Wilkins.

=== ARC Music Television ===
ARC Music TV logo

ARC Music Television, owned by Austereo, was launched three years after MTV ended on the Nine Network on 14 June 1996 in a joint venture with then-music giant Austereo and Village Roadshow through Optus Television, to become a twenty-four-hour music channel playing pop music and airing original programming. After a year on the air, the network was approached by MTV Networks in the US. Through a deal again with Austereo, Village Roadshow Entertainment and Optus Vision ARC were re-branded as MTV Australia.

=== Re-launch and expansion ===
Five months after the initial announcement of ARC's re-branding, MTV Australia was officially re-launched on Optus Television on 20 March 1997. The channel originally produced local programs, but due to cost cutting, aired mostly American content.

In December 2002, MTV was added to the Foxtel platform, and in 2004 was added to the Austar platform. In the same year, the channel set up MTV Networks Australia, which began work on launching its own original programming with the launch of the Australian version of the hit American show TRL on 10 September 2004 with host Kyle Sandilands from 2Day FM. MTV Networks Australia launched sister channel Vh1 on 14 March 2004 when cable company Foxtel launched its digital network.

In 2005, MTV premiered more original programming with MTV Full Tank, and on 3 March, it launched the first inaugural MTV Australia Video Music Awards at Luna Park's Big Top with hosts The Osbournes.

In April 2006, SelecTV began carrying the channel.

At the end of 2006, it was announced that MTV would premiere its latest original show, MTV's The Lair, which premiered on 26 January 2007 and was aired live every Thursday at The Metro Theatre.

In the mid- to late 2000s, MTV Network took ownership of the channel from Optus.

At the beginning of 2007, MTV re-located its head office from Ryde to Yurong St in East Sydney.

In April, MTV Networks Australia launched TMF Australia on the Optus Cable Service.

In February 2010, it was announced that MTV would replace sister channel VH1 with MTV Classic, which launched on 1 May 2010. On the eve of the launch, a spokesperson for MTV Australia announced that a third channel would be launched later in 2010. It was later revealed on 20 September 2010 that MTV would launch three new channels in Australia: MTV Hits, MTVN Live and MTVN Live HD. MTV Hits would play music 24 hours a day, and MTVN Live would have concerts and festivals from around the world as well as documentaries. The channels were set to launch on 1 November 2010.

As part of expanding its local programming, MTV Australia announced its first reality series, Freshwater Blue, which follows the lives of twelve Australian teenagers in the Northern Beaches suburb of Freshwater.

=== 2010–2025 ===
In June 2010, the channel became available on the new FetchTV service.

In 2010, the MTV Australia and MTV New Zealand feeds were merged, and the combined MTV Australia and New Zealand began broadcasting out of the network's Sydney offices.

As of the fall of 2013, Viacom International Media Networks in Sydney had relocated its MTV (for Australia and New Zealand) and Comedy Central (New Zealand) channels to VIMN in London. The channel's advertising department remained in Sydney.

In February 2018, MTV Australia was made available in HD (720p) on Fetch TV, becoming the first and only provider in Australia to do so. Sky also broadcasts the channel in HD.

On 17 September 2019, it was reported that sister channel Network 10 would launch a free-to-air MTV Australia in the coming months. A further announcement was made in May 2020 regarding a fourth multichannel from Network 10, which was expected to feature content from the back catalogue of ViacomCBS properties such as MTV and Nickelodeon. This was confirmed by the network on 13 July 2020, with the new channel launching as 10 Shake in September 2020. It would air kids' content, primarily from Nickelodeon, from 6am to 6pm, with MTV, Comedy Central and CBS programming targeting young adults and adolescents airing from 6pm onwards.

On 1 August 2023, MTV was removed from Foxtel (alongside Nick and Nick Jr.), coinciding with the relaunch of 10 Shake as a free-to-air version of Nickelodeon. At the same time, a suite of MTV-branded Pluto TV FAST channels were made available on Paramount-owned BVOD service 10Play. MTV Australia and New Zealand was replaced by MTV Global in August 2023. The decision to change the feed to the international channel was confirmed by Paramount Global in October 2023. The decision to axe Australian music and programming was criticised by the music industry in Australia. MTV will continue to operate country specific content through its Australian themed social media.

As of June 2025, Foxtel dropped all MTV branded channels in Australia; therefore, viewers can only access MTV content via Paramount Plus.

== Presenters and VJs ==
=== Past VJs ===
- Richard Wilkins
- Joy Smithers
- Darren McMullen (2007–08) joined in January 2007 as host of the live music show The Lair.
- Erin McNaught (2009–10), former Miss Universe Australia, joined MTV Australia as a guest presenter in September 2009, before becoming a full-time member in December.
- Ruby Rose (2007–11) was hired through the 2007 VJ search.
- Jason Dundas was hired through the 2003 VJ search. In 2007, he left the channel and joined the show Getaway on the Nine Network.
- Mike Fitzpatrick was the host of the Triple M breakfast radio show The Cage. In 1999, he hosted the Australian version of Video Clichés. He was also the host of Pepsi Taste of Summer in 2000 and fill-in host of MTV Most Wanted.
- Christine and Sharon Muscat hosted the Australia Top 30 Show.
- Kyle Sandilands was a radio host for the Austereo network. He originally joined in 2005 for TRL Australia. He left the channel when he became a judge for Australian Idol.
- Lyndsey Rodrigues (2005–07) joined MTV Australia in 2005. She left Australia in the summer of 2007 to temporarily co-host the States' version of TRL. She was the permanent co-host of the US version, with Damien Fahey.
- Ian Rogerson
- Lisa Hamilton (MTV News, MTV TRL, Teen Mom Australia Reunion Special)
- Kate Peck (MTV It Girls, MTV News, MTV Top 20)
- Keiynan Lonsdale (MTV News Australia)
- Josh Slyka (VJ MTV Australia)
- Phil Ceberano (VJ MTV Australia)

== Programming and schedule ==
Most of the channel's programming is sourced from MTV USA, MTV Europe and from other content providers within the Viacom/MTV Networks family. This includes entertainment programs popular in the US such as Pimp My Ride, Life of Ryan, Laguna Beach/The Hills, and Room Raiders. Frequently the channel features themed programme blocks and "marathons" on weekends, featuring an entire season of a particular show played over several hours.

=== Imported programmes ===
- 16 and Pregnant
- Are You the One?
- Audrina
- Brothers Green: Eats!
- Catfish: The TV Show
- The City
- Disaster Date
- Ex on the Beach
- Friendzone
- Geordie Shore
- Jersey Shore
- Laguna Beach
- #mtvitgirls
- MTV's Bugging Out
- Pimp My Ride US
- Punk'd
- Ridiculousness
- Rob Dyrdek's Fantasy Factory
- Teen Mom 2
- Teen Mom OG

=== Defunct local shows ===
- Digital Lili
- Fan vs. Band
- Live @ the Chapel for Carlton Cold
- MTV Full Tank (MTV New Zealand)
- MTV Mobbed
- MTV Most Wanted
- MTV News
- MTV's The Lair
- MTV's Official Motorola ARIA Chart Show
- My Pix
- The Rock Chart
- Scrambled Megs
- TRL Australia
- Verushka's Closet
- Vodafone Live at the Chapel

=== Availability ===
MTV Australia was originally only available through the Optus Television service (previously Optus Vision). This exclusivity deal was dropped in late 2002, and in 2003 MTV became available in a premium package on the Foxtel subscription TV platform. Around this time the channel also became available on the Austar platform.

Currently MTV is carried by all English-language pay TV providers. It is available as a basic channel on Foxtel, Austar, TransTV, Neighbourhood Cable and Fetch. On Optus Television the channel is available in add-on tiers. It was formerly available on SelecTV until the closure of its English service in late 2010.

== Other projects ==
=== MTV Australia Awards ===
In 2005, MTV Australia launched the first ever MTV Australia Video Music Awards (now known as the MTV Australia Awards), based on the VMA awards format used in Europe and the US. It was held at Luna Park in Sydney. Following suit with the location, the AVMAs had a circus theme and was hosted by various members of the Osbourne family. The ceremony included many international and local guests.

In 2010, it was announced that MTV Networks Australia would launch MTV Classic, and that the awards ceremony would be replaced with a music event that year.

=== Optus ONE80PROJECT ===
In a joint venture with Sony Ericsson and Optus, MTV launched the Optus ONE80PROJECT, a competition for young writers, directors and producers to create a three-minute pilot and script to be aired on TV, mobile phone and internet. The prize was an opportunity to work with the MTV production team to create full-length dramas to air on the MTV Network. The entries opened on 11 September 2006 and closed on 24 November 2006. Voting commenced on 1 December 2006 and closed on 26 January 2007. The voting included Viewer's Choice and Judge's Choice. The winners were announced on 7 February 2007, with Viewer's Choice going to Ben Briand for Hammer Bay, and Judge's Choice going to Karl Mather and Zenon Kohler for Takoyaki City.

In 2007, the competition was held again, with the winners announced on 28 January 2008 at the ONE80PROJECT festival screening at Harmony Park in Surry Hills. The Viewer's Choice Award went to Kade Robinson for Generation When, and Judge's Choice went to Sarah Daggar-Nickson and Scott Otto Anderson for their co-production Dream Life.

The competition was held again in 2008, with winners to be announced in early 2009.

== Controversy ==
In 2007 rapper Snoop Dogg was scheduled to attend the MTV Australia Video Music Awards 2007 as a co-host on 29 April. A few days before the event, it was announced that Immigration Minister Kevin Andrews would not grant him a visa into the country because of past criminal convictions overseas. In response, MTV Australia organised the "Vote for Snoop" campaign through MySpace, which included videos with Snoop Dogg talking about how much he wanted to become an Australian citizen.

== Links with free-to-air television ==
Occasionally, Australian free-to-air television stations look at the success of shows on MTV before purchasing them for broadcast. Network Ten purchased broadcast rights to The Osbournes from MTV Networks. Ten was required to wait until the show had aired on MTV Australia before broadcasting it themselves. Later, Ten purchased rights to Jackass, Pimp My Ride (as of 2012, this was being shown on 7mate) and Laguna Beach.

Public broadcaster ABC also purchased the rights to animation Daria, which formerly aired during its children's programming slot, edited for content. As of September 2016, Daria was airing on SBS Viceland.

As of 2009, programmes from MTV Networks were being screened on the Nine Network Channel GO!. The Hills was also being broadcast on the channel.

In late 2011, Network Ten bought the rights to air Geordie Shore on its channel for free-to-air television. It started airing on its digital channel Eleven in 2012, and continued to air as of 2013.

As of December 2019, Network 10 was a sister operation to MTV, following the 2019 merger of CBS and Viacom.

== Website ==
The MTV Australia website has had a turbulent history. It was originally hosted without a domain name by Village Roadshow. It gained a domain name in 1998 as mtv.com.au. The website was very basic and only included information about MTV Unplugged and the American VMAs. In 1999, the website seemed to have been abandoned completely. In 2000, the website simply redirected to the American MTV site, before the domain expired and was locked by a holding company. With MTV's expansion in 2003, the site was revived, but pointed towards the MTV Asia Awards. A proper MTV Australia website was launched in 2004 and has since gone through several redesigns. Mini sites for TRL Australia and the AVMAs were also set up.

The site was redesigned in 2007.Free broadband video channel MTV Overdrive launched on 19 April 2007 to coincide with the MTV Australia Video Music Awards 2007. The Overdrive Channel was only available throughout the territory.

In 2009, the website was re-designed, and mimicked mtv.com.

== Spin-off channels ==
Current channels:

- CMT Australia
- Comedy Central Australia
- MTV 80s
- Club MTV
- MTV Hits
- Nick Jr.
- Nickelodeon
- NickMusic
- Ten Network Holdings

Defunct/rebranded channels:

- MTV Dance (relaunched as Club MTV)
- MTV Live HD
- MTV Music (relaunched as MTV Hits)
- VH1 (replaced by MTV Classic), MTV Classic (replaced by MTV 80s)

== Logos ==
MTV logo used 20 March 1997 – 30 June 2011

MTV logo used 1 July 2011 – 13 September 2021

== See also ==
- MTV Australia Video Music Awards
- Nickelodeon Australia
- TMF Australia
- MTV Classic Australia
