= Ovation (Australian TV channel) =

- Country: Australia
- Headquarters: North Ryde

Programming
- Picture format: 576i (SDTV 16:9)

Ownership
- Owner: Ovation Management

History
- Launched: 1 June 1997
- Closed: 27 February 2017

Links
- Website: ovationchannel.com.au

The Ovation Channel was an Australian television channel created by Optus Television to "present dance, opera, theatre, literature, jazz, classical music, design and even fashion, food and wine", modelling it on Canada's Bravo!, which formerly focused on such programming. The channel was founded in 1997 and shut down in 2017.

== History ==
Ovation started broadcasting on 1 June 1997 on Optus Vision; the first programme seen was a documentary on Mexican muralists. Programming was seen weekdays 6pm-10:30pm and weekends 12:30pm-10:30pm. 10% of its total output at launch was local, while 30% of the overall content was new to Australian television.

In March 2006, management of the channel was given to Independent Entertainment, a company run by former SBS head Paddy Conroy under a deal that would see Optus retain ownership until 2009.

In November 2009, it was announced that Foxtel had declined to continue broadcasting Ovation on its platform in 2010. A few days later it was announced that a new arts and entertainment channel run by SBS Television would be replacing Ovation. The following statement was taken from the Ovation Channel's website:

The Ovation Channel has been advised that from early next year it will no longer be broadcast on Foxtel. As a result Ovation will also not be available on Austar. In the meantime, Ovation will continue to provide you with the excellent arts and entertainment programming that you have enjoyed for over 13 years. Ovation thanks you, its large and loyal audience, and invites you to make a comment if you wish.

In March 2010 it was announced that the channel would become a la carte from 1 June on the Foxtel and Austar platforms.

Ovation Channel was formerly available on SelecTV until the closure of its English service in late 2010.

On 18 April 2012, AUSTAR stated that as of 31 May 2012 Ovation would cease to broadcast. Ovation later announced that they would continue to be available via the internet, and in the coming months on LG, Samsung, and Panasonic smart TVs.

Fetch TV ceased transmission of Ovation on 27 February 2017. Ovation now exists solely as an online shop, selling DVDs of programming previously broadcast on the channel.

== Programming ==
Program categories include:

- Art and design
- Australian series
- Ballet and dance
- Classical music and opera
- Concerts, jazz and song
- Drama, theatre and film
- Literature
- People and profiles
- Specials and musicals
