= CMT (Australian TV channel) =

Television channel in Australia

CMT Australia
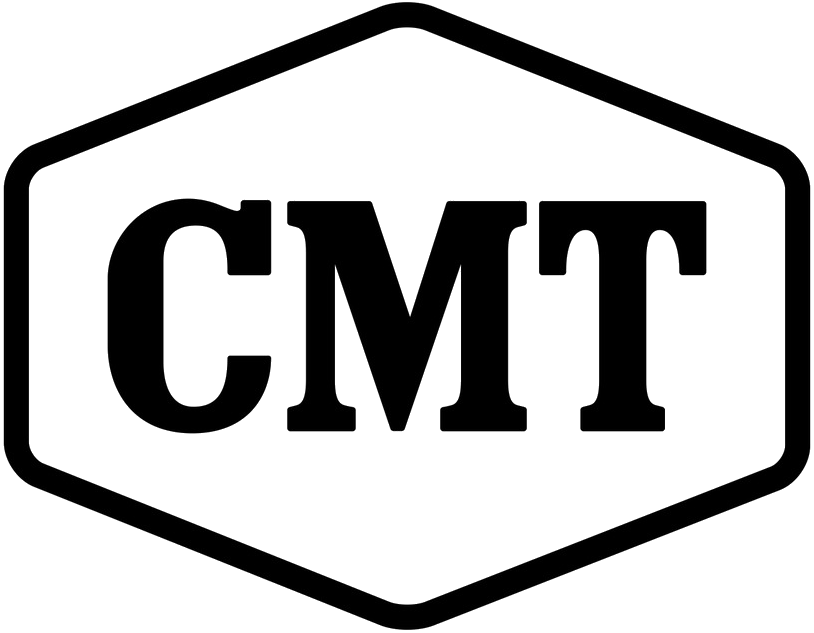
- Country: Australia

Programming
- Language: English

Ownership
- Owner: Paramount Networks UK & Australia
- Sister channels: See Sister channels

History
- Launched: 1 July 2020; 6 years ago
- Closed: 1 July 2025; 16 months ago (Foxtel feed); 31 July 2025; 15 months ago (Fetch feed)
- Replaced by: Country Music Channel (Foxtel feed)

Availability

Streaming media
- Foxtel Go: Channel 805

CMT Australia was an Australian cable and satellite music television channel owned and operated by Paramount Networks UK & Australia. It was the third, and at one point the only, country music video channel in Australia, launched following the closure of Country Music Channel and its predecessor networks.

In June 2020, the channel launched as part of a long-term agreement with Paramount Global, aiming to introduce new music networks to the Australian market. CMT Australia became a localized version of the U.S. Country Music Television (CMT) brand, broadcasting country music videos 24/7, featuring both Australian and international artists.

However, in July 2025, CMT Australia ceased broadcasting on Foxtel and was replaced by a relaunched version of Country Music Channel (CMC), marking the return of a familiar brand to the Australian country music television landscape. The channel closed on Fetch TV on 31 July 2025.
