= (V) =

Former music TV channel

[V]
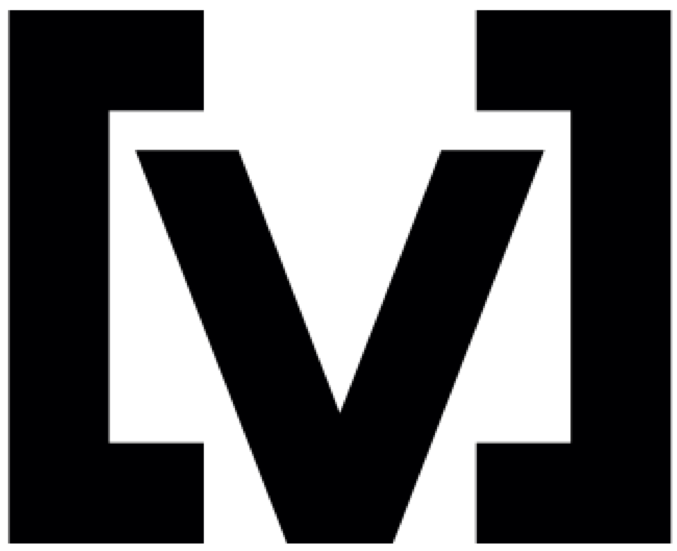
- Country: Australia
- Broadcast area: Australia

Programming
- Language: English
- Timeshift service: [V] + 2

Ownership
- Owner: Foxtel Networks
- Sister channels: Foxtel Networks channels

History
- Launched: 2004; 22 years ago
- Closed: 30 June 2020; 6 years ago
- Replaced by: NickMusic
- Former names: Club [V] Channel [V]^{2} [V] Hits

Links
- Website: http://vmusic.com.au

[V] was an Australian music television channel that was owned and operated by Foxtel. It was available on Foxtel Digital and Optus's digital services.

In 2016, Foxtel decided to close Channel [V] Australia and refocus [V] Hits as its main channel. However, in 2017 [V] Hits was re-positioned as [V] and [V] Hits +2 was rebranded as [V]+2; a timeshift channel.

In May 2020, it was announced that Foxtel would cease operations of [V] at the end of June. The channel was replaced by an Australian version of NickMusic as part of a deal with ViacomCBS Networks UK & Australia.

== History ==
As part of Foxtel's expansion of 20 new channels Club [V] was launched in 2004; the stations focused on dance music and it was originally ad-free

The new name and format of Club [V] was launched on 12 January 2007. In the lead-up to the switch, a message was frequently broadcast on the channel, promising viewers that "A Change is Coming". Since the re-launch, Channel [V] and Channel [V]^{2} had become more closely tied in with each other for example showing viewers what is currently playing on the opposite channel. Both Channels used the same format for displaying song information. Even though the channels are tied-in with each other, Channel [V]^{2} does not play any entertainment oriented shows, instead playing ads for them.

Club [V] logo

Channel [V]^{2} logo

On 15 November 2009, [V]^{2} relaunched as [V] Hits - a 24-hour pop, rock, urban and dance music channel. On 19 June 2012, [V] Hits was investigated as the music video "Born this Way" by Lady Gaga (aired at 6:15 p.m. that day) was considered to have some inappropriate scenes.

[V] Hits logo

On 25 March 2016, a two-hour timeshift version of [V] Hits launched, replacing sister channel Channel [V]. This coincided with the relaunch of [V] Hits as the main music clip channel, featuring only music videos and countdowns.

On 30 November 2016, [V] Hits + 2 moved from channel 803 to 802. In 2017; [V] Hits was rebranded as [V].

On 4 May 2020, it was announced that Foxtel would cease operations of its local music video networks as part of a deal with Network 10 owner ViacomCBS to offer a new range of MTV, Nick and CMT-branded channels in Australia. This took effect on 30 June 2020, with an Australian version of the kid-focused NickMusic taking its place.

=== Programming ===
- Late Night [V]ibes
- Good [V]ibes
- Oz Countdown
- Kick on With [V]
- [V] Live
- The Shazam Chart Show
- 30 Hottest Hits Right Now
- The Spotify Top 50
- [V] Music Video Chart
- Unco[v]ered
- Today's Hit 40
- Triple Play
- Top 25
- Nothin' But...
- Fan Made 5
- Fresh [V]id
- [V] Presents

== Format ==
Throughout the day, [V] holds several countdowns based on certain themes. A large number of the countdowns are top charts based on ratings from country to country. Much larger countdowns can be seen for special occasions, such as the Top 50, Top 100 and Top 200.

In January 2010, [V] Hits aired the "10,000 Hits" countdown, believed to be the largest of its kind ever undertaken.

The overnight output (midnight/10:30 p.m. to 6 a.m.) is advert-free.
