= Max (Australian TV channel) =

Australian music TV channel

- Country: Australia

Programming
- Language: English
- Picture format: 576i (SDTV 16:9)

Ownership
- Owner: NightLife Australia
- Sister channels: Foxtel Networks channels

History
- Launched: 2 December 2000; 25 years ago (original); 1 July 2025; 13 months ago (relaunch)
- Closed: 1 July 2020; 6 years ago (original)
- Replaced by: MTV Classic (Foxtel only)
- Former names: musicMAX (2000–2004)

Availability

Streaming media
- Foxtel Go: Channel 806

Max is an Australian music channel formerly known as musicMAX prior to 14 March 2004, available on Foxtel, Austar and Optus Television. The distinctive MAX logo was designed by Australian designer director, Domenico Bartolo of 21–19.

In May 2020, it was announced that Foxtel would cease operations of Max at the end of June, as part of a deal with Network 10 owner ViacomCBS Networks UK & Australia. It was replaced with the relaunch of MTV Classic at 6AM on July 1; the last video on Max was "Too Good at Goodbyes" by Sam Smith.

However, in July 2025, the channel relaunched, alongside CMC, in Foxtel's new music channel relaunch in partnership with NightLife Australia.

== Programming ==
=== Current programming ===
- Feel Good Hits (Your weekend starts here! Pop hits, familiar favourites, and feel-good fun.)
- Millennial Mixtape (2000s favourites that shaped a generation)
- Moon Dance (A breezy blend of feel good vibes and irresistible grooves)
- Electric Dreams (Low-key classics and fresh hits made for late nights and easy vibes)
- Totally Timeless (The ultimate mix of guitar-driven anthems and singalong favourites. From soaring choruses to easy rock staples, these are the tracks that never go out of style)
- Saturday Soundtrack (Turn it up with weekend ready pop and nothing but good energy)
- Easy Sunday (A smooth mix of laidback hits and timeless favourites)
- Golden Hour Feel (Upbeat, sun soaked acoustic tunes)
- Great Night Vibes (Today’s biggest hits blended with the classics you love)
- Hits and Feels (A steady wave of feel good anthems)
- Sunrise Set (Feel good favourites to start your morning right)

=== Original programming ===
- Feel the Love (a range of clips requested and dedicated by viewers to their loved ones)
- Live Music (a local or international band performing live in the MAX studio every Sunday)
- Loving the '80s (a compilation of the greatest hits from the 1980s)
- Loving the '90s (a compilation of the greatest hits from the 1990s)
- Lunch with... & at Twilight... (an hour of the best clips from the chosen artist, plus interviews and behind-the-scenes snippets)
- MAX Escape Weekend (a countdown on various topics every weekend, such as Top 100 Aussie Songs or Top 100 Sexiest Men)
- MAX Top 50s (a countdown of the Top 50 of various topics, such as Top 50 Karaoke Songs or Top 50 Guitarists)
- My Top Eleven (local or international music guests choose their Top 11 video clips of all time)
- partyMAX (a compilation of the best party songs ever)
- The MAX Sessions (a live concert every week with only the best local or international artists, similar to MTV Unplugged)
- The Know (a weekly talk show featuring pop culture news)
- My First Gig (13 April - 5 June 2009): a 10-part series hosted by Jimmy Barnes

=== Other programs ===
- Later... with Jools Holland (Jools Holland hosts his own music variety show; produced by the BBC)
- 1000 Greatest Songs Of All Time (a special event featuring 1000 songs)

=== Prior programs ===
- Same Title, Different Song (songs with same title, but totally different in sounders)
- Party MAX (non-stop music throughout the night)
- Wake Up with MAX (hottest tunes to wake up to every morning)
- MAX by Requests (videos as picked by viewers)
- MAX Superstar (music videos produced by a chosen artist only)
