= Foxtel =

Australian pay television company

NXE Australia Pty Ltd
- Logo used since 2020
- Trade name: Foxtel Group
- Type: Subsidiary
- Industry: Pay TV, broadband and telephone
- Predecessor: Austar
- Founded: 22 October 1995; 31 years ago
- Headquarters: Gore Hill, New South Wales
- Area served: Australia (including Norfolk Island)
- Key people: Patrick Delany (CEO)
- Products: Satellite, IPTV
- Revenue: $506 million (2024)
- Owner: DAZN
- Members: 4.776 million (2024)
- Subsidiaries: Fox Sports; Hubbl
- Website: www.foxtel.com.au

NXE Australia Pty Ltd, trading as the Foxtel Group, is an Australian pay television company that operates direct broadcast satellite television, and IPTV streaming services. It was formed in April 2018, superseding an earlier company from 1995. The service was established as a 50/50 joint venture between News Corp Australia (which held a controlling 65% stake) and Telstra (which held the remaining 35%).

Since 2025, the company has been owned by DAZN. It shares many features with the Sky service in the UK and Ireland – including the iQ box, the electronic programme guide, a similar remote control, and Red Button Active.

== History ==
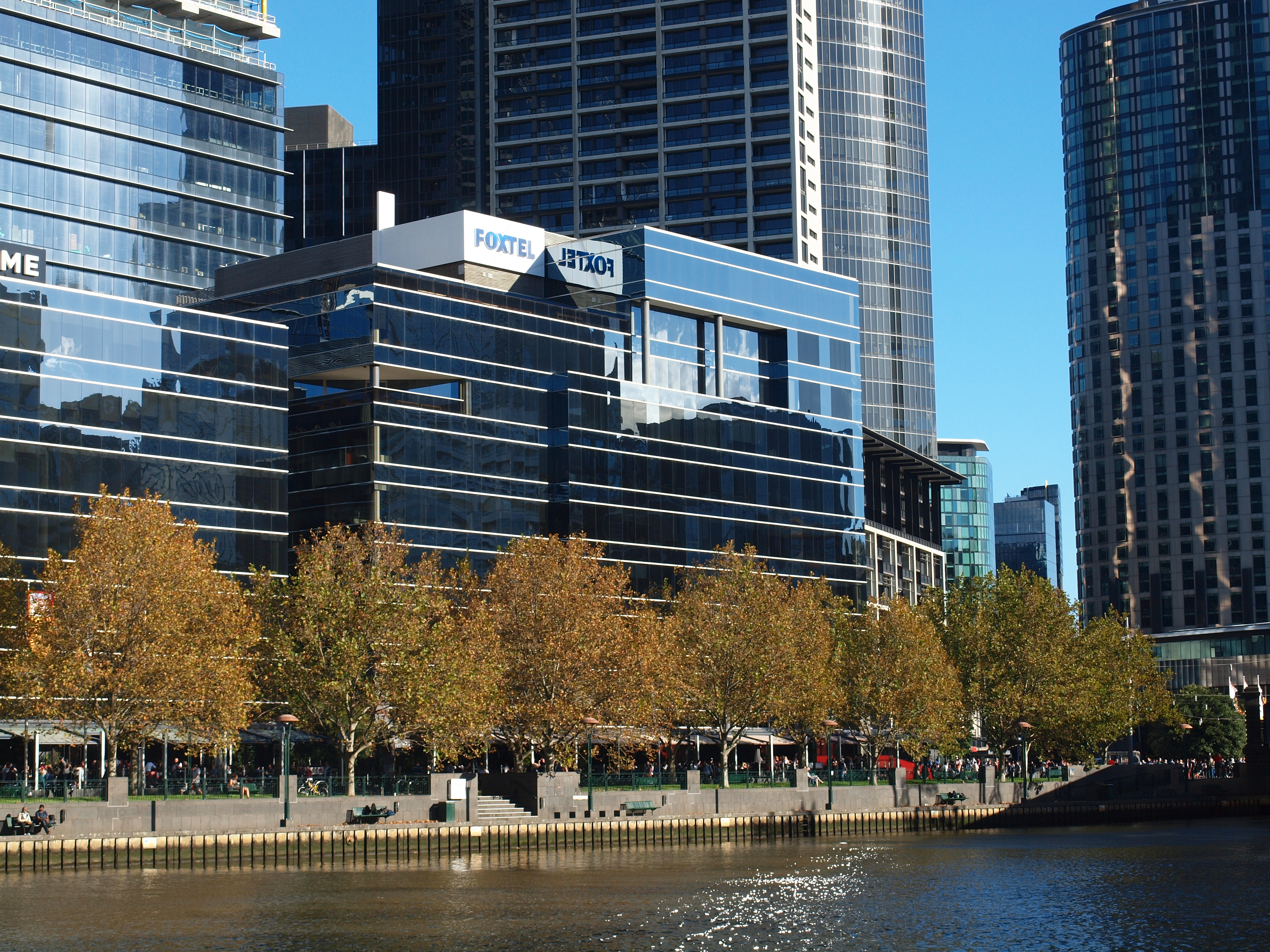
Foxtel offices in Southbank, Victoria

Foxtel was established via a joint venture between News Corporation and Telstra in October 1995. It officially launched on 23 October 1995 with 20 channels, including an exclusive 100 hour commission from Artist Services for its Fox channel.

In May 1998, Australis Media, the owner of Galaxy, was declared insolvent. Foxtel was consequently able to significantly boost its customer base by acquiring Galaxy subscribers from Australis' liquidator and immediately commenced supplying programming to former Galaxy subscribers on an interim basis. In February 1999, Foxtel began offering its own satellite service to new customers.

Kerry Packer, through the company Publishing & Broadcasting Limited (PBL), bought half of News Corp's 50% stake in Foxtel for $150 million in October 1998. Telstra's ownership remained at 50%, while both PBL and News Corp where left with a 25% stake each.

In 2002, a content sharing agreement between Foxtel and Optus Television was approved by the Australian Competition and Consumer Commission (ACCC).

On 11 July 2011, Austar announced that it would be acquired by Foxtel through a transaction agreement with Liberty Global. This takeover received a minority shareholder approval on 30 March 2012, ACCC approval on 10 April 2012, and approval from a Second Court Hearing. Austar shares were suspended from the ASX on 16 April 2012 and delisted on 27 April 2012. The takeover was completed on 24 May 2012.

News Corporation acquired Consolidated Media Holdings in November 2012, bringing its stake in Foxtel to 50%, up from 25%.

BBC and Foxtel announced a partnership in 2013 to launch a premium BBC channel on Foxtel. The channel launched as part of the Foxtel Drama & Lifestyle package in 2014. The deal also included Foxtel broadcasting privileges of four existing BBC channels – UKTV, BBC Knowledge, CBeebies and BBC World News.

In June 2015, Foxtel officially agreed to buyout 15% shares in Ten Network Holdings, thereby ending "nine months of failed takeover bids" from Discovery Channel and Time Warner (these two companies would later merge to form Warner Bros. Discovery).

In June 2017, Foxtel announced that it would be undergoing its first major "Foxtel is for everyone" rebrand. The former logo, described as "quite aggressive, quite arrogant, quite elitist", would be replaced with an all lowercase logo; its Foxtel Play service also rebranded to Foxtel Now.

On 6 March 2018, News Corp Australia announced a merger of Fox Sports Australia with Foxtel. As part of the deal, News Corp would own a 65% stake in the combined entity, with Telstra owning 35% of ownership. The combining of the two businesses placed emphasis on live-streaming sports and entertainment.

On 4 May 2020, it was announced that Foxtel would be closing down its owned & operated music video networks and replacing them with a new suite of MTV, Nickelodeon and CMT-branded channels (MTV Hits, NickMusic, Club MTV, MTV 80s and CMT), as part of a wider deal with Paramount.

On 26 February 2022, Foxtel suspended broadcast distribution of the Russian television network RT in Australia. In September 2022, Foxtel extended their partnership with WWE to become Australia's exclusive home of WWE. Foxtel is to relocate WWE Network into Foxtel's Binge streaming service in January 2023, following the launch of its dedicated linear TV channel in December 2022.

In August 2024, it was reported that News Corp Australia was pursuing a sale of Foxtel, citing third-party interest in the division during a strategic review of its assets. The sale also came amid trends towards cord-cutting and free ad-supported streaming television (FAST) services, and major cuts to News Corp Australia's publishing businesses amid declining advertising revenue. An initial suitor was American private equity firm Platinum Equity, but it was later reported that British sports streaming company DAZN was in active negotiations. On 23 December 2024, DAZN announced that it would acquire Foxtel, in a transaction valuing the company at $3.4 billion. As part of the sale, News Corp Australia and Telstra were to take 6% and 3% minority stakes in DAZN.

The acquisition was completed on 2 April 2025 following the approval of the Australian Competition and Consumer Commission and Foreign Investment Review Board; DAZN stated that it would maintain "Foxtel" and its related brands. Following the merger, Foxtel laid off approximately 100 employees, reported to be mostly from the Hubbl subsidiary.

== Ratings ==
Foxtel grew rapidly in 2007, with most of Foxtel's highest-ever rating events being broadcast that year, including the 2007 AFC Asian Cup quarter-final between Australia and Japan, which drew an average of 419,000 viewers, an Australian pay television record at that time. This ratings record has since been eclipsed by the 2011 Rugby World Cup on Fox Sports 1 averaging around 500,000 viewers, which was smashed by the 2012 London Olympics Coverage, broadcast on 8 dedicated channels in both HD and SD formats, which saw an average of 946,432 viewers tuning in on the opening weekend, with around 600,000 to 700,000 viewers nightly thereafter.

As of 2012, Fox Sports channels, particularly Fox Footy, average between 90,000 and 300,000 + viewers for NRL/AFL matches throughout the week. The highest-rated light entertainment shows are The Simpsons most weeknights on FOX8 with around 110,000 viewers, as well as Family Guy with around 70,000 viewers. A&E has also recorded healthy audience numbers for its TruTV and A&E US syndicated shows from the US – Pawn Stars (85,000), Hardcore Pawn (85,000), and Storage Wars (90,000). BBC UKTV also consistently rates well with British soaps EastEnders (80,000) and Coronation Street (65,000). The LifeStyle channel has experienced audiences in excess of 100,000 people for its Premiere shows Location Location Location Australia, Grand Designs Australia, Selling Houses Australia, Disney Channel (Australia) and The Real Housewives of Melbourne brings strong ratings.

== Availability ==
Foxtel transmitted its cable service via Telstra hybrid fibre-coaxial (HFC) cable into the Brisbane, Sydney, Melbourne, Adelaide and Perth metropolitan areas, along with the Gold Coast. Foxtel now also transmits its satellite service into these cities as well as all over Australia, including regional areas since the takeover of Austar. Previous Austar customers are now 100% Foxtel customers with the conversion from Austar to Foxtel in regional Australia now complete. Foxtel on Mobile launched on Telstra's Next G Network in late 2006 and is now available within Telstra Next G (HSDPA/850 MHz) coverage areas, which covers 99% of the population.

With the transfer in ownership of Telstra's HFC network to NBN Co for the provision of broadband services, Foxtel announced in 2022 that it would be abandoning HFC in favour of satellite and IPTV services. The transition was completed in 2023, after which no Foxtel services have been provided via HFC, thus making NBN's HFC network all-IP, solely carrying DOCSIS services.

Telstra's network and Foxtel were created to combat the threat posed to Telstra's local call business by the combination of Optus Television content bundling with Optus' local telephony services; Foxtel was the content arm of Telstra's defence strategy, while Telstra's multimedia broadband network was originally the sole delivery system.

In 2002, Foxtel and Optus Television agreed to a content-sharing arrangement. Programming competition between the two companies has now dissipated. Prior to its acquisition by Foxtel in 2011, Austar, a regional pay television operator, also carried most Foxtel programming.

Foxtel subscriber growth from 1995 to 2007

As of 2011, Foxtel is Australia's largest pay television operator, with programming available to over 70% of Australian homes, and delivered to over 1.65 million, either directly or by Foxtel's wholesale customers. In April 2008, Foxtel's penetration into Australian homes passed 30%. This penetration rate is significantly lower compared with market penetration rates in the US (over 85%) and in Western Europe (over 55%). This is due to the fact that Australian pay-TV fees are significantly more expensive and pay-TV began delivering its service much later in Australia than in the US.

Foxtel announced its maiden annual profit in 2006, more than 10 years after it commenced services. The installation and maintenance of Foxtel services is Telstra's responsibility. In many markets Telstra has outsourced installation and maintenance to large communications contractors, including ABB Communications and Siemens-Thiess Communications joint venture.

In 2007, Network 10 formed an agreement with Foxtel to allow them to carry a digital version of Ten's programming. Included in the deal is electronic program guide data, which allows Foxtel iQ users to schedule recordings on Ten. Before the agreement, Ten was carried in an analogue format on cable only. In 2008, Seven Network entered an agreement to allow Foxtel to carry its SD signal. In 2008, the first Pay TV package comparison site YouCompare was launched to allow Foxtel packages and pricing to be compared to SelecTV, but this service was ceased along with the ceasing of SelecTV's service in late 2010.

On 24 November 2009, Foxtel added 7two to the East Coast (satellite) and 7two and GO! to cable subscribers. ABC3 was recently introduced on 4 December 2009 to all Foxtel and Austar subscribers.

On 20 May 2010, Foxtel and Microsoft announced a new way of receiving Foxtel through Xbox 360's online service Xbox LIVE. The service launched November 2010 with 30+ channels and an additional 12 Video-on-demand channels. It also provided Foxtel's movie service, known as Foxtel On Demand, to non-subscribers for the first time on a pay-per-view basis. Further linear channels were added in April 2011 with the addition of 7 Telstra BigPond channels.

In June 2011, Foxtel launched an over-the-top service on Telstra's IPTV set top box called Foxtel on T-Box carrying the same services as the Foxtel on Xbox service. Also as of June 2011, Foxtel's subscribers numbered just over 1.65 million.

In November 2014, Foxtel added 2 new SD channels, 9 new HD channels and rebranded 2 sports channels to satellite and cable subscribers.

== Channels ==
Foxtel defines a virtual channel order that groups channels by their content.

General entertainment channels are from 100 to 151 which includes localised advertising on free to air channels such as Channel Nine, ABC TV, SBS TV, Channel Seven and Channel 10, with general entertainment and informational channels including Crime, Arena, LifeStyle, Fox8, BBC UKTV, Showcase, Foxtel One, Comedy, Classics, British, Comcast's Universal TV, Real Life, Seinfeld, LifeStyle Food, LifeStyle Home, Discovery, DocPlay, Real History, Real Crime, Outdoor24, Trace Sport Stars, NatureTime, Haunt TV, Love Pets, Animal Planet, Discovery Turbo, Investigation Discovery, TLC, BoxSets and FashionTV.

Free to air channels including for ABC Kids/ABC Family, ABC Entertains, 7mate, 7flix, 7Bravo, 9Go!, 9Life, 9Gem, 10 Drama, 10 Comedy, Nickelodeon, SBS2, SBS Food and NITV are from 152 to 172.

Special interest channels are from 173 which include Aurora.

Religious channels are from 180 to 189 which includes GOOD., Daystar Television Network and SBN.

High definition and Ultra High definition channels are from 200 to 299 which includes localised advertising versions of ABC HD, 7HD, 7two, 7mate HD, 9HD, 9Gem HD, 10 HD, SBS HD, SBS2 HD and NITV HD, and timeshifted versions of general entertainment and informational channels for a two-hour delay of Fox8, Crime, Foxtel One, Comedy, Classics, Arena, TLC, Lifestyle, Lifestyle Food, BBC UKTV, Showcase, British, Real Life, Discovery and Discovery Turbo.

Movie packaged channels are from 400 to 499 which includes Foxtel Movies Hits (themed movies and pop-up events), Ultra HD, Premiere, Family, Action, Comedy, Romance, Drama, Greats, British Cinema, Aussie Classics, PULP and SBS World Movies.

Sports channels are from 500 to 599 which includes Fox Sports News, Fox Cricket, Fox League, Fox Sports 503, Fox Footy, Fox Sports 505, Fox Sports 506, Fox Sports 507, Disney's ESPN and ESPN 2, Main Event (pay-per-view), Main Event 2 (pay-per-view), Sky Racing 1, Sky Racing 2, Sky Thoroughbred Central and Racing.com. As of 2025, they're UHD and HD sports channels.

News channels are from 600 to 699 which includes News24, News24 Weather, News24 World, Comcast's Sky News, BBC News, Fox News (US sister channel of News24 Australia), Warner Bros. Discovery's CNN International, Versant's MS NOW, CNBC, NBCUniversal's NBC News Now, Bloomberg Television, ABC News, Al Jazeera English, CGTN, CGTN Documentary, NHK World-Japan and GB News.

Pre-Teenage entertainment channels are from 700 to 799 which includes DreamWorks Channel.

Music video channels are from 800 to 829 which includes Foxtel Networks‘s Trending, Kids, Club, Retro, Country Music Channel, Max and Australian Played and Vevo’s VEVO Pop, VEVO 2K, VEVO 90s, VEVO 70s, VEVO Rock and VEVO Country.

Audio only channels are from 830 to 899 which includes LiSTNR, SBS Radio, SBS Radio 2 and SBS Chill.

Foreign language channels are from 900 to 989 which includes Greek radio Ant1 Radio and ANT1 Pacific and Italian radio Rai Radio 1 and Rai Italia.

Also available on iQ3, iQ4 and iQ5 set top boxes are ABC iview, ABC Kids, SBS On Demand, 7plus, 9Now, 10, Netflix, Disney+, Paramount+, HBO Max, F1 TV, BeIN Sports Connect, YouTube, Amazon Prime Video, Apple TV, BritBox, Stan and DocPlay apps.

=== Defunct channels ===
Channels that were re-branded include: 13th Street (rebranded as Fox Sleuth), Syfy (rebranded as Fox Sci-Fi), 111 Funny (split and rebranded into Fox Hits and Fox Funny), W (renamed SoHo), BBC HD (replaced by BBC UKTV HD), Fox Kids Australia (shared with Fox Classics), Weather 21 (replaced by The Weather Channel), The Weather Channel (replaced by Sky News Weather), Encore (renamed to Showtime Greats) (replaced by Showtime Action, Showtime Comedy and Showtime Drama, both swallowed with Foxtel Movies), VH1 Australia (Replaced by MTV Classic), MTV Live HD, Air Active (which was replaced by Foxtel Music), KidsCo (Replaced by Discovery Kids), Fuel TV, Speed (both replaced by Fox Sports 505 & 506 respectively), SoHo (Replaced by Binge), Channel [V] (Replaced by [V] Hits, later renamed [V]), MTV Music and MTV Dance (relaunched as MTV Hits and Club MTV respectively) and MTV Classic (replaced by MTV 80s).

HD multichannels that were replaced by other HD channels include 10 Drama (replaced by 10 HD, 10 Drama was reduced to SD) and 9Gem (replaced by 9HD, rebranded today as 9Gem and was reduced to SD). 9Gem later relaunched an HD simulcast.

Channels completely discontinued include BBC First, BBC Earth, BBC News, CBeebies, beIN Sports, MTV, Nickelodeon, Nick Jr., PBS Kids, Disney XD, Disney Channel, Disney Junior, Binge, Discovery Science, Discovery Kids, Foxtel Movies Disney, Eurosport, Your Money, The Soundtrack Channel, Movie Network (replaced by Foxtel Movies), Showtime Network (replaced by Foxtel Movies), TechTV, Ovation, KidsCo, History+2, Starpics (replaced by Foxtel Movies), Gamesworld Interactive Games and the Interactive Sports Selector. Also discontinued in July 2020 were music channels [V] (replaced by NickMusic) and Foxtel Smooth (closed down).

TV1 and SF ceased transmission at 11:59 pm, on 31 December 2013 after Foxtel chose not to renew their contracts as they wanted to bring as many channels in house as they did with their movie offerings.

STUDIO ceased transmission at 11:59 pm, on 27 March 2015 after choosing not to renew the contract with SBS Television. This was replaced by Foxtel Arts in both SD and HD on Channel 132.

Turner Classic Movies were discontinued and terminated on 13 December 2016.

Disney XD ceased broadcasting and transmission on 6 January 2019.

The Comedy Channel ceased broadcasting and transmission on 1 September 2020.

Disney Channel and Disney Junior ceased broadcasting and transmission on 13 February 2020.

beIN Sports and PBS Kids ceased broadcasting and transmission on 1 July 2023.

Paramount channels MTV, Nickelodeon and Nick Jr ceased and broadcasting transmission on 1 August 2023. The channels continue to operate on other providers in Australia and New Zealand, and Foxtel continues to carry Paramount's music video networks. By September 2023, all MTV music channels (except CMT) were switched from localised feeds to the global feed.

BBC First, BBC Earth, BBC News and CBeebies ceased broadcasting and transmission on 31 July 2024.

Audio only channels includes ABC NewsRadio, Radio National, ABC Local Radio stations, ABC Classic, Triple J, Double J and ABC Jazz.

On 3 June 2025, Foxtel announced that it would discontinue its Paramount-branded music channels on 30 June.

== Current services ==
Although originally launching in 1995 with just a cable service, Foxtel has branched out into many new services since its inception including broadband and phone services in 2014.

=== Foxtel Go ===
Foxtel subscribers are able to access live and on-demand content within packages they are subscribed to through the internet via Foxtel Go.

Foxtel launched the Foxtel Go service on 7 November 2012. Originally, it was only available on iPad, but from 20 February 2013 it was also available on iPhone, and later on Mac, Windows PC and selected Android devices. Foxtel Go was launched after the success of its London 2012 app, which simulcast 8 live high definition channels that were also offered on the standard Foxtel service.

Access to the Foxtel Go app is free for residential customers with a set-top box and a Foxtel or Foxtel Now subscription, allowing access to any channel that they are subscribed to. Only five devices can be linked to an account during any given month with only two being able to view content at the same time.

Unlike Mobile Foxtel (provided by Telstra) – which only provides a loop of selected shows – Foxtel Go offers a live simulcast of a subset of channels available through the traditional cable and satellite services. The service also has no time limits; Mobile Foxtel offers only 15 minutes of programming per session, or a maximum 200 minutes per month.

The channels currently available to subscribers are:

Essentials – Showcase; Comedy; Fox8; BoxSets; Arena; Lifestyle; Real Life; Club MTV; NickMusic; MTV 80s; Sky News; Sky News Weather; News24 World; Sky News UK; Fox Sports News; CNN; Fox News; BBC News; CNBC; Bloomberg; NHK World-Japan; Fox Comedy; TLC; E!; Lifestyle Food; Lifestyle Home; Foxtel Arts

Drama Plus – UKTV; Fox Crime; BBC First; Universal TV; Fox One; Fox Sci-Fi; Fox Sleuth

Kids – CBeebies; School Holidays Pop-Up Channel

Sport – Fox Sports, Fox Cricket; Fox League; Fox Footy; ESPN; ESPN 2

Movies – Premiere; Kids; Action; Comedy; Romance; Family; Drama; Hits; Thriller; Greats; LMN; SBS World Movies

Docos – A&E; History; Discovery Channel; Discovery Turbo; Animal Planet; Investigation Discovery; Crime + Investigation; BBC Earth

Foxtel Go also offers an on demand service for most channels listed above, including sports channels.

=== Foxtel Now ===
Foxtel Now (formerly Foxtel Play) is an internet television alternative to the traditional Foxtel subscription, offering customers a no lock in contract subscription starting at $10. The service offers over 50 live channels and hundreds of hours of video on-demand content across six subscription packages.

The service is available across a range of devices such as computers, TVs and video game consoles. In addition, subscribers have access to Foxtel's Foxtel Go app expanding access to smartphones and tablets.

On 4 October 2016, Foxtel announced that a new look Foxtel Play streaming service would roll out from December 2016 and that Foxtel Play would be a simpler, cheaper and more flexible IP-delivered product.

As part of a company wide rebrand in June 2017, Foxtel announced that from 7 June, Foxtel Play would be renamed Foxtel Now and would gain HD streaming and Chromecast support with a lower starting price of $10 per month (later increased to $25 per month).

=== Foxtel magazine ===
Foxtel has a magazine with a monthly reach of about 700,000. It is published by Medium Rare Content Agency, and distributed to Foxtel subscribers (who choose to pay for this service) via post.

== Hubbl ==
Hubbl, formerly Streamotion Pty Ltd, is a wholly owned subsidiary of Foxtel that develops and operates over-the-top subscription streaming services. Currently, the group operates Kayo, Binge and Flash, as well as WatchNRL and WatchAFL internationally.

== Past services ==
- Foxtel Digital
- Foxtel On-Demand

=== Foxtel HD ===
Foxtel HD+ logo

Foxtel announced their high definition service, originally called Foxtel HD+, on 30 January 2008. It became officially available on 19 May 2008 at a nominal price of $10 AUD despite similar "HD" resolution broadcast channels already available on free-to-air television. HD+ launched with four channels; BBC HD, ESPN HD, Fox Sports HD and a timeshared documentary channel for Discovery HD World and National Geographic HD programming. Foxtel Box Office also began simulcasting in high definition.

On 15 November 2009, another ten high definition channels were launched; Fox Sports 2 HD, Fox Sports 3 HD, Fox8 HD, Movie One HD, Showcase HD, Showtime Action HD, Showtime Premiere HD, Starpics 1 HD, Starpics 2 HD and W HD. BBC HD was relaunched as UKTV HD and the timeshared documentary channel was split into full-time versions of Discovery HD World and National Geographic HD. The pricing and packaging of the HD+ channels was also revised.

BBC Knowledge HD, MTVN Live HD, Nat Geo Wild HD and Speed HD launched almost a year later on 1 November 2010. ESPN 2 HD and Lifestyle HD launched on 1 March 2011. A&E HD, Fox Footy HD and FX HD launched in late February 2012. Eight new high definition channels for the London Olympics began broadcasting on 25 July 2012. Foxtel launched eight new high definition movie channels on 1 January 2013, replacing the five existing high definition movie channels from Showtime and The Movie Network. The new channels included Action/Adventure HD, Comedy HD, Drama/Romance HD, Family HD, Masterpiece HD, Premiere HD and Thriller/Crime HD. Main Event HD began broadcasting on 3 September 2013.

Syfy HD launched on 1 January 2014. Foxtel added Disney Movies HD on 10 April 2014. UKTV HD was replaced with BBC First HD on 3 August 2014. On 3 November 2014, nine new high definition channels were launched; 13th Street HD, Arena HD, BoxSets HD, Eurosport HD, Fox Sports 4 HD, Fox Sports News HD, History HD, Universal HD and World Movies HD. Speed HD was also relaunched as Fox Sports 5 HD at the same time. Binge HD launched on 5 October 2015. Sky News National HD began broadcasting on 1 December 2015, with Sky News Business HD beginning on 19 January 2016. Foxtel Arts HD began broadcasting in March 2016. On 1 April 2016, Sky Thoroughbred Central HD launched. Sky News Election Channel HD launched on 1 May 2016. Foxtel added another high definition movie channel with More Movies HD launching on 1 July 2016.

In response to Optus Sports winning the rights to the English Premier League, Foxtel launched six new high definition sports channels on 15 May 2016. These included beIN Sports 1 HD, beIN Sports 2 HD, beIN Sports 3 HD, Chelsea TV HD, LFCTV HD and MUTV HD. Sky News Election Channel HD was replaced with A-PAC HD in January 2017. Movie Greats HD was added on 23 March 2018. Sky News UK HD launched as a standalone channel on 27 May 2018 with A-PAC HD also rebranding to Sky News Extra HD. Fox News Channel HD launched in November 2018.

A retransmission of the free-to-air networks' high definition channels is also available to high definition cable subscribers and satellite subscribers with an iQ3 set-top box or later. These channels include ABC HD, SBS HD, SBS Viceland HD, SBS World Movies HD, 7HD, 7mateHD, 9HD, 9Gem HD and 10 HD.

Foxtel's high definition channels are broadcast in H.264 in both 720p and 1080i resolutions. As of 2011, almost a third of Foxtel's customers were receiving the HD service.

=== Foxtel Download ===
On 1 October 2009, Foxtel launched an online download service which allows all cable and satellite customers to access Foxtel content via their computer. The service were free for customers, who can download programmes from channels within their subscription package. There were one live streaming channel, ESPN3, while the remainder of the service provides episodes of programs from 38 channels. Then CEO, Kim Williams, highlighted that Foxtel planned to expand its live streaming channel range later in the year to coincide with the 2010 Vancouver Winter Olympics and the launch of thirty new channels for Foxtel Digital and HD. This service has been the source of great controversy as there was no support for Linux, Mac or any 64-bit Windows operating systems, leaving many users unable to install the client. Foxtel Download was discontinued in September 2012, with the service no longer being available to subscribers.

=== Mobile Foxtel ===
Launched in late 2006 to coincide with Telstra's NextG 3G mobile phone network, Mobile Foxtel (previously Foxtel By Mobile) offers 33 standard channels of programming for a small subscription fee, optimised for mobile devices. the channels on the service were: Sky News National, Your Money, CNN, Fox Sports News, Fox8, The Comedy Channel, MTV, E! Entertainment, Fashion TV, Discovery Mobile, Disney Channel, Eurosport, Union Extreme Sports, Cartoon Network, TV1, National Geographic, ABC, SBS One and Eurosportnews.

With the exception of CNN, Fashion TV, Eurosportsnews, Eurosport, Fox News, BBC World News and Fox Sports News, which were direct simulcasts of the actual channel and Sky News channels which are taken from the Sky News Active service, all channels are pre-produced loops that do not directly correlate to the full scale satellite/cable channel. There were a limit of 200 minutes per month, with 15 minutes per session, may apply to the service, although this has not been strictly enforced.

The service was discontinued on 27 July 2016.

=== Foxtel on Xbox 360 and Internet TV ===
Foxtel launched in November 2010 for the Xbox 360 games console, offering 38 channels, catch-up television and on-demand movie streaming. It requires both an Xbox Live Gold subscription and a Foxtel subscription. Samsung Smart TVs received the same service at no additional cost in July 2012. This has been replaced with Foxtel Now.

=== Presto ===
In 2014, Foxtel launched a movie streaming operation Presto, which was initially priced at $19.99, but was halved a few months later. Presto was spin-off a television streaming service with Seven West Media in early 2015.

Foxtel announced the Presto service would be closed in January 2017, and customers moved to a Foxtel Now service.

=== Fox Movies ===
In August 2018, Foxtel launched a streaming VOD (video on demand) movie service called FoxFlicks. This service is available to subscribers who have either the movie pack or platinum pack with the new iQ4 set-top-box. It has since been rebranded as Foxtel Movies.

=== Live2Air ===
In December 2006, airline Virgin Australia (then known as Virgin Blue) announced a partnership with Foxtel and Austar to introduce a "Live2Air" service on most flights by mid-2007, providing live satellite TV to passengers via the in-flight entertainment system. The Live2Air system offered 24 Foxtel channels and was only available on selected Boeing 737 aircraft, and was phased out beginning in 2012.

== Devices ==
Foxtel devices are manufactured by Pace plc on behalf of Foxtel – they have manufactured a variety of devices including:

=== Foxtel Standard ===
There is a variety of Foxtel standard units. These lack the recording features of the iQ models, but can be connected to a VCR or DVR. Foxtel has phased out the standard boxes for all new installations and provides the iQ3, iQ4 or iQ5 instead. The additional features of the iQ models (such as recording) can be deactivated if the customer does not wish to pay for them, in effect making them operate as if they were a legacy model.

=== Foxtel iQ ===
Foxtel launched Foxtel iQ in early 2005. It is a timeshifting personal digital recorder in which subscribers are able to record programmes onto a 160 GB hard drive inside the set-top unit for later viewing. Foxtel iQ includes a feature called Series Link, which lets the viewer choose to record all future episodes in a given television series (availability is limited to certain programmes). Foxtel iQ also allows viewers to use live rewind and pause features during television programmes. Two new services, On Demand and Remote Record, launched in 2007. Remote Record was launched on 1 January 2007 and allows users to log into the interactive TV guide on the Foxtel website and then command their iQ at home to record shows, while On-Demand was launched on 8 February 2007. This service is based on Sky+, which was launched on News Corporation's UK television platform Sky in 2001. There are currently two models of Foxtel iQ, with identical functionality to the user but different audio-visual output abilities. Both models have two tuners, allowing users to record two programmes (or record one and watch one) simultaneously. Pace plc are the set top box provider for iQ, of which they claim that the cable version of iQ is the first DVB-based cable digital video recorder.

The updated version of the original iQ unit is physically smaller, but allows for better quality recordings and HDMI up-scaling as well as an Ethernet Port to allow Box Office downloads. It can also order On-Demand titles without the need of the phone line connected to the model. These boxes are referred to as the iQ1.5, to differentiate them from the original iQ boxes. As of 1 March 2017, these boxes are no longer available to new customers.

=== Foxtel iQ2 ===
The second-generation iQ2 box was launched alongside the Foxtel HD+ service in mid-2008. Equipped with a 320GB HDD, iQ2 is capable of recording 30 hours of HD and 90 hours of SD content and offers, double that of the original iQ. The unit also offers HDMI connectivity.

The iQ2 is equipped with four tuners, of which one is reserved for on demand content. This allows users to record two programs at once while watching a third live.

As of 2011, 75 per cent of Foxtel subscribers are using an iQ series unit, 40 per cent are using Multi-Room, and 40 per cent are using iQ2 (and therefore, HD).

On 2 November 2011, Foxtel started notifying subscribers of the option to upgrade (at an additional one-off $200 upgrade fee) to a 1TB model with four times the recording capacity. As of 17 August 2020, these boxes are no longer available to new customers.

=== Foxtel iQ3 ===
Foxtel's third-generation model, iQ3, was first referenced by CEO Richard Freudenstein in March 2012, and was released to customers on 23 March 2015. The iQ3 contains increased internet connectivity with the inclusion of Wi-Fi and the ability to re-watch certain broadcast programmes to the start using on-demand technology. The iQ3 includes a 1TB HDD (3x the capacity of the previous iQHD) and a bluetooth remote. After the release, many customers had complaints due to the unstable nature of the iQ3 graphical user interface and additionally accused Foxtel of releasing an 'unfinished product'. Foxtel denied such claims along with rumours that up to 2,000 iQ3 boxes were quickly launched in response to market rival Netflix launching in Australia in April 2015. As of November 2015, instability issues are yet to be resolved. However, an iQ3 software update in late 2019 allows integration with Netflix titles when connected to a television unit with an application for the service.

=== Foxtel iQ4 ===
Foxtel's fourth-generation model, iQ4 was launched in August 2018 and is 4K compatible. Foxtel launched Foxtel 4K, a dedicated 4K channel, on 7 October 2018, with the broadcast of the Supercheap Auto Bathurst 1000.

=== Foxtel iQ5 ===
The iQ5 is Foxtel's latest set top box which came out in September 2021 and can operate in two different modes depending on what service is available at customer's premises. It can be connected to an existing Satellite service, where a dish is already installed and working, or connected to the internet to stream Foxtel content in internet-only mode.

== Advertising on Foxtel ==
When Foxtel was launched in 1995, advertising during programmes was banned under Australian Government legislation for the first two years. Foxtel has since significantly increased advertising across its platform, although still today legislation prevents Foxtel and other pay TV businesses from earning more than 50 per cent of their revenue from advertising. Sometimes, viewers are exposed to up to 5 minutes worth of adverts for every 8 minutes of programming. Certain programming on select channels are ad-free such as films or live games on Fox Sports, as well as select premium networks such as Fox Showcase.

== Legislation affecting Foxtel ==
The Australian anti-siphoning laws also prevent Foxtel and other pay TV suppliers from acquiring exclusive rights to specific sporting events such as cricket, golf, tennis and the football codes. Under the legislation pay TV licensees are prevented from bidding for major sporting events until a right is acquired by the ABC, SBS, Seven, Nine and Ten networks. In 2009, the Minister for Communications announced a review of the legislation. In an Olympics year, the Australian anti-siphoning list runs to over 1300 events and is one of the longest in the world.

== Third-party access ==
Foxtel prevents users from using their subscription card in a third-party decoder, and requires all users to watch the service on a supplied set-top box, included with the subscription. However, some users have reported being able to watch certain channels on a computer with a DVB-C card and using sasc-ng to decrypt the video content using card readers to read the decoding keys stored on the card used in Foxtel's iQ.

== Foxtel Networks ==
On 24 May 2012, Foxtel merged with Austar, resulting in Foxtel gaining Austar's shares in XYZnetworks (which Foxtel closed and created Foxtel Networks), as well as their shares in Main Event.

Channels owned by Foxtel include:

- Fox Sports Pty Ltd
  - Fox Sports
  - Fox Sports News
  - Fox Cricket
  - Fox League
  - Fox Footy
- Lifestyle
  - Lifestyle Food
  - Lifestyle Home
- Arena
- Real
  - Real Life
  - Real History
  - Real Crime
- Fox8
- Classics
- Crime
- Foxtel One
- Showcase
- Comedy
- British
- BoxSets
- Foxtel Movies
  - UltraHD
  - Premiere
  - Family
  - Action
  - Comedy
  - Romance
  - Drama
  - Hits
  - Greats
- Main Event (66.6%; joint venture with Optus Television)

=== Former channels ===
- A&E (closed on 31 July 2024)
- TVHits (replaced by Fox Crime)
- Binge (replaced by Fox One)
- 111 (replaced by Fox Funny)
- The Comedy Channel (merged with Fox Comedy)
- Bio (closed on 1 November 2015)
- Fox Kids (closed in 2004)
- Foxtel 3D (closed 27 August 2013)
- SoHo (replaced by Binge)
- SciFi (closed on 29 February 2024)
- Lifestyle You (closed on 11 October 2017)
- Channel V Australia (replaced by V Hits + 2)
- [V] (formerly V Hits)
- Famous (closed on 26 August 2025)
- Foxtel Arts (replaced by Famous)
- Foxtel Movies
  - Foxtel Movies Kids (closed in 2023)
  - Foxtel Movies Thriller (closed on 29 February 2024)
- Foxtel Smooth (replaced by Foxtel Arts)
- Fox Funny (closed on 1 March 2023)

== Logo history ==
1995–2002

2002–2005

2005–2012

2017–2018

2018–2020

2020–present

== See also ==
- Fox Broadcasting Company
- Subscription television in Australia
