= Optus Television =

Australian subscription television provider

- Formerly: Optus Vision (1995–1999)
- Type: Division
- Industry: Pay television
- Founded: 19 September 1995
- Headquarters: Melbourne, Victoria, Australia
- Area served: Australia
- Key people: Paul O'Sullivan (chief executive)
- Products: Optus TV featuring Foxtel; Foxtel iQ (via Foxtel); Yes TV from Fetch
- Parent: Optus
- Website: www.optus.com.au/digitaltv

Optus Television is the cable television division of Australian telecommunications company Optus.

== History ==
Its immediate predecessor was Optus Vision, a joint venture between Optus and Continental Cablevision, with small shareholdings by media companies Publishing & Broadcasting Limited and Seven Network. It was founded to handle residential cable television and local telephony, while its parent concentrated on corporate, long-distance, satellite and interstate communications. It used a hybrid fibre coaxial cable network to connect homes to its network and subsequently added broadband cable internet access.

Optus Vision used the Optus telecommunications licence as its authority to build a cable network, which it deployed in Sydney, Melbourne, and Brisbane.

Optus's main competition, especially in the metropolitan areas, was Foxtel, a joint venture between Telstra and News Corporation.

Optus negotiated exclusive access to AFL, rugby league, and other sports, and had exclusive access to Disney Channel, ESPN and MTV Australia, but lacked the general entertainment channels Foxtel had. It commenced its cable TV service in September 1995, one month before Foxtel, delivering a limited number of channels to a small number of subscribers, all of whom were connected via its Blacktown Exchange.

From 1995 to 1997, the Super League war waged between the two consortia over lucrative rugby league rights. In March 1997, Optus bought out the other shareholders in exchange for equity in itself, to float.

In 2002, it let go of some of its exclusive content contracts, replacing them with non-exclusive ones. MTV Australia, Disney Channel, ESPN and the premium Movie Network channels all became available on Foxtel.

In 2009, Optus Television stopped offering service to new subscribers but maintained it for existing subscribers.

From February 2011, Optus again offered Optus TV featuring Foxtel including IQ2 services.

On 14 February 2016, Singtel-Optus renewed their contract with Astro-Fetch TV in preparation for the 2016/17 EPL season.

=== Satellite broadcasting ===
Optus, along with Austar had a joint venture in the use of Satellite broadcasting for the delivery of Subscription Television. Originally, Foxtel had not previously offered a Satellite service, until purchasing the satellite subscribers from Australis Media within their service area. Until 2004, Foxtel was a customer of the Austar/Optus joint venture.

Optus utilised this joint venture to initially trial and subsequently offer a basic satellite service, named VIP. The service was very select with not many being able to access the service. It was also offered to Norfolk Island and some smart cards were enabled for some residents (who had the required satellite receiving equipment) to take part in a trial of the service. The ability to offer the service came about due to Optus offering a large number of channels to East Coast Television (now a part of Austar). After Optus axed the "VIP" Service, it also sold its share in the joint venture to Austar.

In 2004, the roles reversed and Austar became the customer to Foxtel for satellite delivery.

=== Sports programming ===
Until 2002, Optus did not offer the Fox Sports sporting channels on their service as Foxtel and Austar did, instead offering channels from Sportsvision (later C7 Sport) and ESPN.

During the Super League/ARL war, the Optus sports channels had the rights to the ARL competition and the Super League rights were held by Fox Sports.

Seven bought Sportsvision, which became Optus and Austar exclusive C7 Sport and progressively lost sporting rights to Fox Sports. During that time Foxtel granted Optus an NRL Channel, screening all of the NRL matches that had previously been shown exclusively on the Foxtel platform.

C7 Sport for some time had attempted to access the Foxtel platform for their service – however Foxtel were hesitant to accede to the request, with one exception being the 2000 Sydney Olympics, where C7 offered two extra channels dedicated to Olympics coverage.

In 2000, Seven and C7 Sport lost the AFL rights to a Nine/Ten and Foxtel-based consortium leaving C7 with only the Olympic Games and Six Nations Championship rugby union rights of major substance.

In March 2002, the commencement of the new AFL broadcasting deal with Foxtel led Optus and Austar to drop C7 Sport from their services, leading to the demise of the channel. Optus replaced the C7 channels with an Optus rebadged version of Fox Sports. Optus dropped the "Optus Sports" name in October 2002.

The dropping of the C7 service led to Optus being a party in the unsuccessful legal action taken by the Seven Network over the demise of the C7 Sport service.

On 13 July 2016, Optus launched Optus Sport, a group of sports channels that were established to televise the Premier League.

== Subscriber numbers ==
For some time, Optus has not explicitly released subscriber numbers for their Optus Television service, however combining them with other services offered under the division of which Optus Television is a part.

Since December 2002, subscriber numbers have dropped considerably to almost half of the 241,000 reported. Since that time, Optus has repositioned its television service to being a major component of bundled services, rather than a service by itself. By August 2010 only 96,000 subscribers remained.

== Optus iTV trials ==
During 2002–2003, Optus trialled interactive digital television over part of its Sydney network. The service was being built from 2000. This service was known as Optus iTV. The service was unique to Optus and had a good deal of positive consumer feedback. The iTV service utilised the Liberate platform instead of OpenTV, as used by Foxtel Digital. The trials were cancelled by Optus after the Content Supply Agreement with Foxtel was reached. One byproduct of the new agreement was the re-engineering of the Optus iTV broadcast centre in Macquarie Park to become the new broadcast centre for Foxtel.

A notable difference between Optus iTV and Foxtel Digital was that the Optus system used the same HFC cable network both for delivery and for the return path, meaning no additional hardware or service was required for this return path. By contrast, the Foxtel Digital system at the time relied on a telephone connection for the return path. The advantage of this system is that it is platform neutral, meaning that the same telephone-based return path can be used for both cable and satellite installations.

The Optus iTV system also allowed near video on demand (nvod) not true video on demand. Foxtel Digital now provides Near Video on Demand as well. Featured content broadcast on multiple channels with staggered start times available at frequent intervals. Some new Foxtel Services offer a "Video on Demand" ability for limited product, various transmission paths offer a broader VOD version.

Other potential features of Optus iTV included e-mail and walled garden Internet access.

== Optus TV featuring Foxtel ==
Former Optus Television logo

After signing up to the Content Supply Agreement with Foxtel, Optus Television changed their channel lineup to reflect the offerings from Foxtel. Optus were able to have a number of differences between their offering and the Foxtel offering, so that Optus could meet some contractual obligations they had, as well as satisfying a number of requirements placed on the organisation by the Australian Competition & Consumer Commission.

A number of channels that had previously been unique to Optus (in comparison with Foxtel) such as the Odyssey Channel were removed from the Optus line-up, as they competed with channels that Foxtel offered. Other channels crossed from Optus to the Foxtel line-up such as the Ovation Channel. Optus was required to have a number of channels that were unique to their service, though the flagged channels are now available on both platforms without any change in regulation nor penalty.

== Optus TV featuring Foxtel Digital ==
In April 2005, Foxtel granted Optus the right to carry the "Foxtel Digital" platform (one year after being available to Foxtel subscribers) The service would be resold by Optus, utilising the same equipment as Foxtel (such as the Foxtel set top box, remote, NDS technologies for encryption and OpenTV for interactivity delivery).

This agreement also allows for non-exclusive resale rights to the Foxtel Digital service using Satellite Delivery within Foxtel's service area.

Commencing trials in November 2005, the service became fully operational in December of the same year.

Optus is believed to be permitting wholesale access to the network so third party broadcasters can sell subscription services over Optus cable.

== See also ==
- Subscription television in Australia
