= Fetch TV =

Australian provider of Internet Protocol Television

- Type: Independent Pay TV Provider
- Industry: Internet television
- Founded: July 2010
- Headquarters: North Sydney, Australia
- Area served: Oceania
- Products: Independent, IPTV, Pay-per-view, Pay television
- Owner: Telstra (51.4%); Astro Malaysia Holdings (48.6%)
- Website: www.fetchtv.com.au

Fetch TV is an Australian IPTV provider that offers a subscription television service over a user's regular internet connection. It is majority owned by Telstra, who acquired a 51.4% stake in the company on the 2nd of August 2022. Fetch TV was initially launched in July 2010 by Malaysian Astro Malaysia Holdings.

Fetch TV provides a set-top box with a digital TV tuner, a personal video recorder, and up to 40+ subscription channels. It also offers video-on-demand, pay-per-view movies, web applications, and a mobile app.

The service is delivered using HLS adaptive bitrate streaming. The minimum internet sync speed required varies depending on the ISP delivery method. Most of Fetch TV's content is unmetered when delivered over a broadband connection from a Fetch TV ISP partner.

== History ==
- On 25 May 2010, Fetch TV announced that they would commence offering their first-generation set-top box PVRs through their partner, iiNet. These boxes featured three digital tuners to receive Australian terrestrial channels, along with fourteen linear subscription channels and six Video on Demand-based channels. On 21 July, they introduced five international news channels to the subscription channel package. On 6 August, they included the SVOD service, WarnerTV.
- Fox Sports News was added on 27 August 2010. By 14 February 2011, Fetch had added Chelsea TV, Man City TV, Barcelona TV, Man Utd TV, and Real Madrid TV.
- The Ovation channel and Setanta Sports were added shortly after. Setanta was later made available as a $15/month add-on to the basic subscription package. The Travel Channel joined on 15 September 2011, and Optus started reselling the service.
- Syfy was introduced in 2014. Starting from 1 February 2015, the subscription channel pack underwent a complete revamp, with nine new channels added, including ESPN and BBC, and six channels removed. When Setanta Sports was acquired by the Al Jazeera Media Network in 2014, the channel was rebranded as beIN Sports (Australia).
- On 16 February 2015, Fetch TV announced plans to become the first Australian pay-TV provider to integrate the Netflix service into its platform. This allowed users with a separate Netflix subscription to access Netflix content through the Fetch TV set-top box. In March 2016, it was revealed that Optus would add its Optus Sport channels, featuring the English Premier League, to the service. These channels were exclusively available to Optus customers. On 15 June 2016, Fetch TV unveiled their third-generation boxes: the 4k-capable Mighty and the puck-like Mini. This announcement also included the addition of Spike to the channel pack and plans to add the Presto and 9Now apps to the service. Their press release from the event hinted at a future catch-up service for content available on the entertainment pack channels.
- In 2016, Fetch TV began testing HD broadcasts for channels like ESPN, beIN Sports (Australia), and Optus Sport, with a minimum resolution of 720p. Customers with third-generation boxes reported that they were receiving BBC First and BBC Knowledge in HD.
- On 27 February 2017, Fetch launched their new channel packs. They divided their available channels into four groups, allowing them to be purchased separately or as a bundle. They also confirmed that several channels would be delivered in HD, with 'more improvements to come in the next 60 days'.
- In October 2016, Fetch launched the next generation of their mobile app.
- In July 2017, Fetch became the 'Official Broadcaster of the UFC' in Australia. They offered pay-per-view fights at $54.95 AUD and other content broadcast exclusively through their 'Edge Sport HD' channel.
- In August 2018, Fetch added the remaining BeIN Sports (Australia) channels 2 & 3.
- On 10 October 2019, BBC Earth was launched as part of BBC's global rollout. It featured a live channel and on-demand content, replacing BBC Knowledge.

== Models and Features ==
Fetch TV offers two set-top boxes: the Mighty and the Mini. The Mighty allows access to 4K programming, along with serving as a 1 TB DVR media hub with four tuners, while the Mini is limited to 1080p HD with a limited pause buffer and can use the Mighty as its host for a multi-room setup. Both come with over-the-air antenna tuners in addition to Fetch programming.

== Subscriber Base ==
Fetch TV Australia faced significant competition in the marketplace from rivals like Foxtel and Telstra TV. In 2014, mainstream technology and financial media sources suggested that the service needed to increase its subscriber base to thrive. In response, the company stated in 2013 that it had strategies in place to achieve success and significantly increase its subscription base.

In early 2016, it was revealed that the service had 400,000 active subscribers and aimed to reach 600,000 by the end of the year. This goal was achieved in late 2017, with Fetch citing the growth of Australia's National Broadband Network as a key driver. On the back of the NBN, Fetch added an average of 20,000 customers per month in 2017.

The service operates an industry TV ratings app that provides an indication of which boxes are subscribed at any given time and which channels have what share of their audience.

== World Language Channels ==
=== Pinoy TV Package ===
8 channels.

- Aksyon International
- DWLS – Audio
- DZBB – Audio
- GMA Life TV
- GMA News TV
- GMA Pinoy TV
- Kapatid TV5
- Viva TV

=== TVB Cantonese & Korean Package ===
4 channels.

- KBS World
- TVB Jade
- TVB News
- TVB News Channel

=== Taj Mahal (Indian and Pakistani) Package ===
23 channels.

- &TV
- Bindass
- CNN-News18
- Colors Rishtey
- Colors TV
- ET Now
- Good Times
- Hum TV
- Star Bharat
- MTV India
- NDTV
- NDTV India
- PTC Punjabi
- Star Plus
- Sony SAB
- Sony MAX
- Sony SET
- Star Gold
- Times Now
- UTV Movies
- Zee Cinema
- Zee TV
- Zoom

== Apps ==
Fetch boxes receive the following apps:

- Amazon Prime Video
- Apple TV
- Netflix
- Stan
- Disney+
- YouTube
- Hayu
- BritBox
- ABC iview^{1}
- SBS On Demand^{1}
- 7plus
- 9Now^{1}
- 10^{1}
- Paramount+^{1}
- HBO Max

Note:
^{1} Appears in 'Catch Up' menu.

== See also ==
- Internet television in Australia
- Subscription television in Australia
