= Television in Australia =

Television in Australia began experimentally as early as 1929 in Melbourne with radio stations 3DB and 3UZ, and 2UE in Sydney, using the Radiovision system by Gilbert Miles and Donald McDonald, and later from other locations, such as Brisbane in 1934.

Mainstream television was launched on 16 September 1956 in Willoughby, New South Wales, with Nine Network station TCN-9 Sydney. The new medium was introduced by advertising executive Bruce Gyngell with the words "Good evening, and welcome to television", and has since seen the transition to colour and digital television.

Bruce Gyngell re-enacts his introduction to the first regular television broadcast service to the residents of Sydney on TCN-9.

Local programs, over the years, have included a broad range of comedy, sport, and in particular drama series, in addition to news and current affairs. The industry is regulated by the Australian Communications and Media Authority, through various legislation, regulations, standards and codes of practice, which also regulates radio and in recent years has attempted to regulate the Internet.

== History ==
=== Origins: Early transmission trials ===
In 1885, Henry Sutton developed a Telephane for closed circuit transmission of pictures via telegraph wires, based on the Nipkow spinning disk system, so that the Melbourne Cup could be seen in Ballarat. Reports differ on whether the Telephane was successfully implemented.

The first television broadcast in Australia took place on 30 September 1929 at the Menzies Hotel in Melbourne, using the electro-mechanical Radiovision system. Other transmissions took place in the city over the next few weeks. Also in 1929, the Baird system was used on 3DB, 3UZ and 2UE.

After 18 months of test transmissions, regular broadcasts began in Brisbane on 6 May 1934 using a 30-line system, to an estimated 18 receivers around Brisbane. The test transmissions, which were of 1-hour duration each day, were made by Thomas M. B. Elliott and Dr Val McDowall from the Wickham Terrace Observatory Tower. The programs included news headlines, still pictures and silent movies such as the temperance film Horrors of Drink. The Commonwealth Government granted a special licence and permission to conduct experimental television by VK4CM, in July 1934. By 1935, it expanded to 180 lines. Other experimental transmissions followed in other cities.

=== Early demonstrations ===
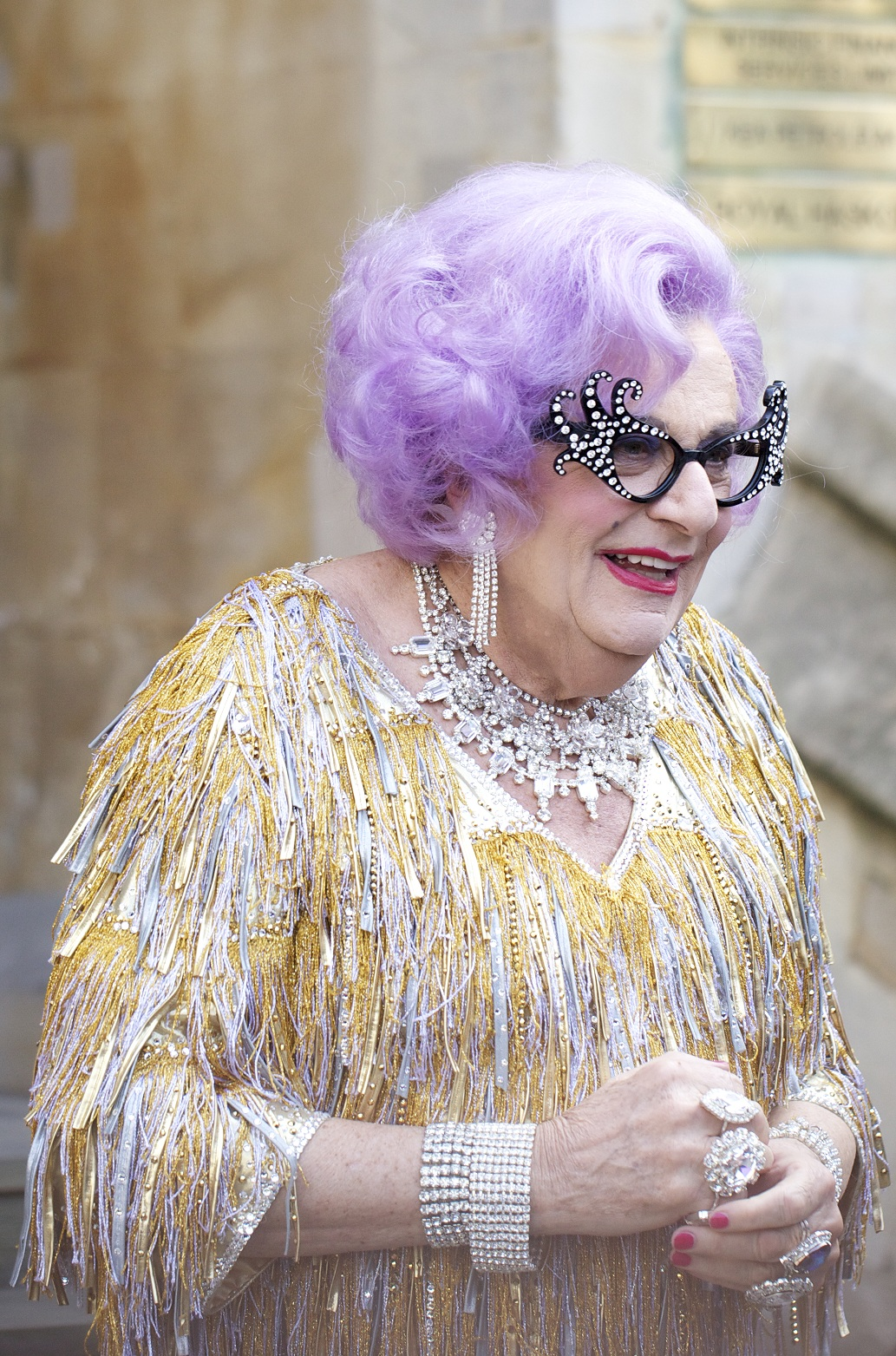
Melbourne "housewife" Edna Everage (a comic creation of performing artist Barry Humphries), first appeared on Australian television in the 1950s.

Television commenced in the United Kingdom and the United States before World War II. The two countries developed radically different industry models, which were based on the models each used for radio broadcasting. British broadcasting was entirely controlled by the government-created broadcasting corporation, the BBC, which derived its revenue from compulsory viewer licence fees. The United States adopted a commercial model, based on privately owned stations and networks that earned revenue by charging for advertising time, with public broadcasting forming only a minor component of the larger system.

In June 1948, the Australian Labor Government under Ben Chifley, opted to follow the British model, on the advice from the Postmaster-General's Department. It decided to establish a government-controlled TV station in each capital city and called for tenders for the building of the six TV transmitters. The Broadcasting Act 1948 specifically prohibited the granting of commercial TV licences, a decision that the Liberal-Country Party opposition criticised as "authoritarian and socialistic". This policy was never put into practice, however, because the Labor government did not have the opportunity to establish the TV network before it was defeated in December 1949. The incoming Robert Menzies-led Liberal-Country Party coalition, which was to hold power for the next 23 years, changed the industry structure by also permitting the establishment of American-style commercial stations.

The economic situation at the time that TV was established in Australia exerted a pivotal influence on the foundation and subsequent history of the industry. When the decision was made to go ahead with granting the first licences for broadcast TV in the early 1950s, Australia was in a recession, with severe shortages of labour and materials and an underdeveloped heavy industrial base, and in this context TV was seen as a drain away from more fundamental projects.

The Menzies government was concerned about the long-term viability of the new industry and worried that it might be called on to bail out struggling stations and networks if the economy deteriorated. Consequently, it decided to grant the initial commercial TV licences to established print media proprietors, with the expectation that these companies would, if necessary, be able to subsidize the new TV stations from their existing (and highly profitable) press operations.

Meanwhile, in 1949, the first large-scale public demonstrations of the medium took place when the Shell company sponsored a series of closed-circuit broadcasts in capital cities produced by Frank Cave. These broadcasts were elaborate, usually opened by a local politician, and featured many people appearing on camera – singing, playing instruments, and giving demonstrations of cooking, sport, and magic tricks.

Buoyed by the success of these tests, in March 1950, the Astor Radio Corporation embarked upon a tour of 200 regional towns with a mobile broadcast unit, giving a series of 45-minute demonstration programs, allowing local performers and members of the public to appear on camera.

In January 1953, in response to increasing pressure from the commercial lobby, the Menzies government amended the Broadcasting Act 1948 to allow for the granting of commercial licences, thus providing the legislative framework for a dual system of TV ownership. This structure was directly modeled on the long-established two-tiered structure of Australian broadcast radio—one tier being the stations in a new national, government-funded TV network run by the Australian Broadcasting Commission (ABC), and the other tier being privately owned commercial stations that drew their income from advertising revenue.

Commercial TV licences were nominally overseen by the Australian Broadcasting Control Board (ABCB), a government agency responsible for the regulation of broadcasting standards and practices, while technical standards (such as broadcast frequencies) were administered by the Postmaster-General's Department. The ABC, as an independent government authority, was not subject to the regulation of the ABCB and instead answered directly to the Postmaster-General and ultimately to the Minister for Posts and Telegraphs (a situation that provoked bitter complaints from commercial radio in the mid-1970s when the ABC established its controversial youth station Double Jay).

=== Commencement of broadcasting ===
In 1954, the Menzies Government formally announced the introduction of the new two-tiered TV system—a government-funded service run by the ABC, and two commercial services in Sydney and Melbourne, with the 1956 Summer Olympics in Melbourne being a major driving force behind the introduction of television to Australia.

TCN-9 Sydney began test transmissions on 16 September 1956 and officially commenced broadcasting on 27 October. HSV7 Melbourne became the first television station to broadcast to viewers in Melbourne on 4 November, soon followed by ABV-2 then GTV9 on 19 January 1957. Sydney station ABN-2 also started broadcasting in November. All of these stations were operational in time for the 1956 Melbourne Summer Olympics opening ceremony, on 22 November 1956. ATN-7 started in December.

An interview with Mrs Edna Everage (a comic creation of performing artist Barry Humphries) was one of the programmes screened on HSV-7's first day of programming in 1956. The character went on to great success in the United Kingdom and later, the United States.

Videotape technology was still in its infancy when Australian television was launched in 1956 and video recorders did not become widely available to Australian TV stations until the 1960s. For the first few years, the only available method for capturing TV programs was the kinescope process, in which a fixed movie camera filmed broadcasts screened on a specially adjusted TV monitor. Similarly, the playback of pre-recorded programs to air was only possible at this stage through the telecine process, in which films or kinescoped TV recordings were played back on a movie screen which was monitored by a TV camera.

Because of these limitations, it was relatively difficult and expensive to record and distribute local programming, so the majority of locally produced content was broadcast live-to-air. Very little local programming from these first few years of Australian TV broadcasting was recorded and in the intervening years, the majority of that material has since been lost or destroyed. Even the footage of the 'first' Australian TV broadcast with Bruce Gyngell on Channel 9, Sydney (see image above) is a fabrication—according to Gerald Stone the kinescope film of the actual September 1956 broadcast was lost and the footage that exists today is a considerably more polished re-enactment, made a year later.

Most programs in this early period were based on popular radio formats—musical variety and quiz formats were the most popular.

=== Local content deficit and Vincent Report ===
Commercial television licences required local programs for half of all broadcasts (a British import counted as 1/2 of a local program) each week, including six hours of Australian-made dramas. In the first decade after the first TV licences were granted, the federal government and the ABCB did not act to enforce local content quotas, and such measures were resisted by the commercial sector. As a result, Australian TV was soon dominated by material imported from the United States and (to a far smaller extent) Great Britain. In this period nearly every TV drama screened in Australia came from the US and the few programs that were made locally were almost all produced by the ABC. In other formats, the few locally produced programs made by or for commercial stations were typically low-cost copies of proven American talk/variety or quiz show formats. By the early 1960s, at least 80% of all Australian TV content was sourced from the US and not surprisingly American programs consistently topped the ratings.

These changes led to a significant concentration of cross-media ownership, with newspapers' influence over the television industry probably greater than anywhere else in the world. By 1960, Frank Packer's Consolidated Press group controlled Channels 9 in Melbourne and Sydney (the flagship stations that formed the basis of the Nine Network), Melbourne's Herald and Weekly Times group owned HSV-7, and the Fairfax newspaper group controlled ATN-7 in Sydney. In the view of some media historians, these arrangements established a pattern of "high-level political allegiances between commercial broadcasters and Liberal-National Party governments" and that, as a result, the ABCB "was left very weak and uncertain in its capacity to control broadcaster conduct and exhibited strong symptoms of regulatory capture, or over-identification with the industry it regulated". Newspaper TV listings listed the associated television station's programs first, and articles did not discuss competing stations' programs.

In 1963, the Senate Select Committee on the Encouragement of Australian Productions for Television, chaired by Senator Seddon Vincent (known as the Vincent Committee) presented its report to federal parliament and its findings painted a bleak picture for local producers—the Committee found that 97% percent of all television drama shown on Australian TV between 1956 and 1963 was imported from the United States, and it criticised the ABCB for failing to use its powers to enforce local content standards on television broadcasters, particularly the commercial stations. The Vincent Report recommended a sweeping program of reforms but none were implemented by the Menzies Government at that time.

The advent of TV effectively destroyed Australia's once thriving radio production industry within a few years, and the absence of local production quotas for TV in this formative period compounded the problem. Faced with almost unbeatable competition from American-made programming, local technical and creative professionals in radio were unable to make the transition to the new medium, as many of their American and British counterparts had done when TV was introduced there.

Those Australian producers who did try to break into TV faced almost insurmountable challenges. The country had little theatrical or filmmaking experience. After filming Whiplash in the country in 1960, Peter Graves said that the biggest problem was the shortage of Australian actors. Imported American and British programs benefited from high budgets, an international talent pool, and huge economies of scale, thanks to their very large domestic markets (relative to Australia), established worldwide distribution networks; additionally, since most American production houses and networks were based in Los Angeles, they had access to resources and expertise built up over decades by the Hollywood movie studios. These disadvantages were further exacerbated by the fact that American producers and networks offered Australian channels significant discount rates on bundled programming. Taken as a whole, these factors meant that local producers were faced with a relative production-cost ratio on the order of 10:1 or more in favour of the imported product.

Some sense of the scale of this "resource gap" can be gained by comparing the budgets of contemporary American and Australian TV programs. The pilot of the 1967 satirical sketch comedy series Laugh-In reportedly cost about US$200,000. At the top end of the scale, in 1966 Desilu Studios spent almost US$1 million on the two pilot episodes for the science fiction series Star Trek – the first pilot "The Cage" (which was rejected by NBC) cost more than US$600,000 and the set for the bridge of the Enterprise alone reportedly cost US$60,000; the second pilot, "Where No Man Has Gone Before" cost around US$300,000.

By comparison, the budget for the pilot episode of the 1964 Australian topical revue series The Mavis Bramston Show was just AU£1500. Adjusted for inflation, this was around A$3500 in 1967 figures; given that US–Australian dollar exchange rate in 1967 was A$1.00 = US$1.12, this still would have only equated to around US$4,000—50 times less than Laugh-In.

Although by the end of the 1950s television had expanded to also include Brisbane, Adelaide and Perth, it was estimated that in 1956 less than 5% of the residents in Melbourne, and fewer than 1% in Sydney, owned a television set, which at the time cost, on average, six to ten weeks' wages. During these early years, broadcast days were very short—all stations including the ABC-only broadcast programs for a few hours each day and broadcast the test pattern for the rest of the time they were on air. Broadcast times were gradually increased over succeeding decades, although ABC did not commence 24-hour broadcasting until 1993.

=== Early programmes ===
The TV series The Adventures of Long John Silver was made in the Pagewood Studios, Sydney, for the American and British market; it was shown on the ABC in 1958. Local content was limited to talk shows, variety shows, and news & current affairs. Notable programs of the 1950s included TCN-9's long-running music variety program Bandstand, (based on the US version of the same name) hosted by radio presenter and future newsreader Brian Henderson; HSV-7's weekly sport program, (that would broadcast for the next 28 years) World of Sport; and the shorter-lived programs, including the ABC's Six O'Clock Rock, hosted by Johnny O'Keefe. The first Australian serial drama, Autumn Affair, ran for a 10-month run on ATN-7. Programming also covered religion; for example, Discovering the Bible. Several programs in the 1950s were simply adaptations of already established radio programs such as Pick a Box.

=== Television and programming in the 1960s ===
The 1960s saw the continued growth of television in Australia, particularly into regional areas. The first regional TV services began in Victoria in 1961 with the first being Gippsland's GLV-10 followed by Shepparton's GMV-6 and Bendigo's BCV-8. NBN-3 in Newcastle was the first regional service in New South Wales commencing broadcast in 1962.

While the first television services were being established in regional areas, larger cities including Melbourne, Sydney, Brisbane, Adelaide, and Perth began to receive their second and, in the mid-1960s, third stations. In order to reduce costs, networks began to merge – originally in 1957 between HSV-7 and TCN-9, but later between almost all the metropolitan stations of a certain frequency. This led to the formation of the National Television Network (forerunner to the Nine Network) and Australian Television Network (later known as the Seven Network) in 1962. Not all stations became a part of their respective networks – TVW-7 in Perth remained independent for a number of years as the sole commercial station in the city. Throughout the decade the ABC expanded transmissions to several major centres including Adelaide, Perth, Hobart, and Canberra.

Beginning in 1964, the federal government tried to address concerns about competition and local production by licensing a third station in major cities, beginning with Channel 0 in Melbourne and Channel 10 in Sydney. More third-licence stations were established in other capitals and regional cities over the next few years and by the late Sixties these stations joined forces to create Australia's third commercial network, originally known as the Independent Television System (ITS), then later changed to the 0–10 Network, and now called Network 10.

When local quota enforcement began, the unusually high amount—of the quota, and total number of broadcast hours from all stations—forced commercial stations with small budgets to find more local programs than in the UK or Europe. This resulted in what one station owner described as "muck" being broadcast. Had quotas always been enforced, audiences would not have had high expectations based on imported programs.

Channel 0 in Melbourne took an early lead in catering to teenage viewers and quickly became the preeminent network in pop music programming, commissioning a sequence of popular and influential local pop shows including The Go!! Show and Kommotion (1964–1967), Uptight (1968–70) and Happening '70 and its successors (1970–1972).

Don Lane appearing split-screen with Graham Kennedy via co-axial cable in 1963, live on In Melbourne Tonight.

The establishment of the Sydney–Melbourne co-axial cable link between Sydney and Melbourne in 1962 marked the first step in the establishment of effective national networking for Australian TV stations. The cable-supported the simultaneous live broadcast of the 5th test of the 1962–63 Ashes series to Sydney, Canberra, and Melbourne – a major milestone in Australian television history.

The introduction of satellite broadcasting in the late 1960s allowed news stories and programs to be accessed from around the world. The first live satellite transmission occurred between Australia and the United Kingdom in 1966. The first direct telecast across the Pacific from North America to Australia took place on 6 June 1967 when "Australia Day" at Expo 67 in Montreal was broadcast live to Australia via a US satellite link. Prime Minister Harold Holt officially opened the Australian pavilion and visitors watched events including boomerang throwing, sheep-dog trials, wood chopping contests and tennis matches with members of the Australian Davis Cup team.

In the afternoon a variety concert, 'Pop goes Australia', featured musicians Normie Rowe, Bobby Limb, Rolf Harris and The Seekers. The entire 10-hour program was televised live and several hundred thousand people across Australia sat up through the night to watch it. One newspaper reported that the picture was so clear that hundreds of viewers rang a Sydney television station to seek assurance that the pictures really were being broadcast live from Canada.

Two weeks later, on 25 June 1967, Australia participated in the historic Our World broadcast, the first live global satellite television hookup involving fourteen countries. The event is now chiefly remembered for the participation of The Beatles, who performed their new song "All You Need Is Love" live from the Abbey Road Studios in London. Australia's contribution showed a Melbourne tram leaving the depot for its early morning run, which caused some controversy as people felt that it was not a very exciting image of Australia. By 1970 as many as thirty-one programs were received via this manner. GTV-9 in Melbourne broke records in 1969 for the world's longest scheduled live telecast with its coverage of Apollo 11, running for 163 hours, a record which has since been beaten. As the signal from the moon was received at NASA's Honeysuckle Creek Tracking Station near Canberra, an Australian television executive boasted that "Just for once we were not at the end of the line, our accustomed place 'down under'".

Even though the dominance of imported American and British programming continued, local production gradually increased in the 1960s and several important new Australian programs were launched. Crawford Productions' Melbourne-based police drama Homicide premiered on 20 October 1964 on HSV-7, soon followed on 11 November by the ATN-7 satirical sketch comedy series The Mavis Bramston Show (which at its peak drew an unprecedented 59% of the audience), the rural soap opera Bellbird on the ABC (1967), and for interstate viewers Graham Kennedy's In Melbourne Tonight or the Graham Kennedy Channel Nine Show. In addition to these, many programs still seen today were launched at this time including the ABC's acclaimed current affairs program Four Corners (1961) and Play School – now the country's longest-running children's show—as well as the Nine Network's Here's Humphrey, which both premiered in 1966.

Veteran actor-producer John McCallum and filmmaker Lee Robinson created the children's adventure series Skippy the Bush Kangaroo which premiered in 1968 on the Nine Network. At a reported cost of A$6000 per episode it was said to have been the most expensive Australian TV series yet produced up to that time (by comparison, the first series of Star Trek reportedly cost around US$200,000 per episode). Although Australian TV was still in black-and-white at the time, Skippy was filmed in colour with a view to overseas sales and it was the first Australian-made series to achieve significant international success, with sales to more than 80 countries worldwide, and it became the first Australian TV show to be widely screened in the USA.

Winners of the first nationally shown TV Week Logie Awards included In Melbourne Tonight host Graham Kennedy – twice, Pick-a-box host Bob Dyer, Lorrae Desmond from ABC's The Lorrae Desmond Show, Four Corners reporter Michael Charlton, Bobby Limb, Jimmy Hannan, Gordon Chater, Brian Henderson and Hazel Phillips.

Numerous television stations were launched, mainly concentrated around the southern and eastern parts of the country. By the turn of the decade, the takeup of television had increased dramatically – by 1960 up to 70% of homes in Sydney and Melbourne had a television set. Following its introduction to regional centres and other capital cities through the late 1950s and 1960s over 90% of Australian homes in established markets had a television set. The new medium had also become highly lucrative to advertisers.

In 1967 the NSWRFL grand final became the first football grand final of any code to be televised live in Australia. The Nine Network had paid $5,000 for the broadcasting rights. That same year, ATV-0 telecast the Pakenham races in colour under the supervision of the Broadcasting Control Board.

The first fully equipped permanent colour studios and post-production facilities were set up in 1969 at Video Tape Corporation in Sydney (VTC), by executives that decamped from TEN. Although the output was hobbled to monochrome until 1974, many original long and short-form productions were completed over the years until its closure and eventual absorption into other companies in the late 1980s.

Test broadcasting of colour began in the late 1960s. The full changeover to colour transmission did not occur until 1975.

=== Television and programming in the 1970s ===
Following the new medium's establishment in most major metropolitan and regional centres, television continued to expand to remote areas, most notably those in the northern and western parts of Australia – Darwin, for example, did not receive television until ABD-6 and NTD-8 launched in 1971. Similarly, VEW-8 launched in Kalgoorlie on 18 June 1971, and ITQ-8 launched in Mount Isa on 11 September 1971. The youngest network, the 0/10 Network, as it was then known, launched the controversial sex-melodrama serial Number 96 in March 1972. The success of this program led to this third network becoming commercially viable.

In 1969, a group of ex-network executives pooled together to create Video-Tape Corporation (VTC) in East Roseville. This was to be the first end-to-end 'fully electronic' (no film) colour video facility in the region, intended to be up and running with studios, audio, OB and post-production facilities to feed the emerging colour broadcast industry. To accommodate producers and film aesthetics, VTC also installed comprehensive 'film-to-tape' (telecine) capabilities as they grew. However the networks and government were locked in their own battles, and despite being ready for full-colour operation from around 1971, VTC was hobbled until 1973–74 before the content would ever reach "the masses". Around that same time, Royce Smeale/ECV arrived to offer a complementary service with more emphasis on production and OB services.

In 1972 it was announced that all stations would move to colour on 1 March 1975, using the European PAL standard mandated in 1968. The slogan used to sell colour television to the Australian public was 'March first into colour'. Australia was to have one of the fastest change-overs to colour television in the world – by 1978 over 64% of households in Sydney and Melbourne had colour television sets.

Government subsidies provided for the production of local series led to a boom in Australian-produced content. Some of the most popular series included Crawford Productions police dramas Homicide, Division 4 which started during the 1960s and Matlock Police which began in 1971; variety series Young Talent Time; comedy/variety series Hey Hey It's Saturday, which ran for 28 years until 1999, music show Countdown; soap operas Bellbird which had started in late 1967, Number 96 and The Box, and the World War II-themed The Sullivans. Against the Wind, the first major mini-series produced for commercial television, was shown on the Seven Network. Later hospital drama The Young Doctors ran for 1396 episodes between 1976 and 1983, becoming at the time it ended Australia's longest-running drama series.

Graham Kennedy returned to the Nine Network after his departure from In Melbourne Tonight with The Graham Kennedy Show in 1973, but was banned from appearing on television in 1975 after an infamous 'crow-call' incident. Kennedy subsequently returned in 1977 as the host of Blankety Blanks. In 1979, commercial stations were mandated to provide 'C'-classified programming targeted at children between 4-5pm, and a minimum of 30 minutes of pre-school programming prior to that. These regulations saw the establishment of a number of children's series including Simon Townsend's Wonder World and Shirl's Neighbourhood.

News and current affairs, particularly on commercial television, grew significantly – the Nine Network's A Current Affair, hosted by Mike Willesee began in November 1971, while 60 Minutes, on the same network, began in 1979. In March 1972, Brisbane station BTQ-7 claimed the first one-hour newscast in Australia. The one-hour newscast format was also later adopted by regional station NBN, Newcastle, and capital city television stations TEN-10 Sydney and ATV-0 Melbourne.

A special Gold Logie Award was awarded to the Apollo 11 crew in 1970, alongside actors Barry Crocker and Maggie Tabberer. Other Gold Logie winners included Gerard Kennedy, Tony Barber, Graham Kennedy, Pat McDonald, Ernie Sigley and Denise Drysdale in the first awards presentation shown in colour, Don Lane, Jeanne Little, and Bert Newton.

Sports broadcasting became increasingly sophisticated through the 1970s. ABC, the Seven Network and the Nine Network joined to broadcast the 1976 Olympic Games in Montreal, with the opening and closing ceremonies telecast live, and highlights packages shown each night. During November of the same year, RTS-5a commenced transmissions in Riverland, with GTW-11 launching in Geraldton on 21 January 1977.

The 1977 VFL grand final was shown live to Melbourne viewers for the first time. As with the Olympics, the 1978 Commonwealth Games in Edmonton, Alberta, Canada were shown in the form of highlights packages on ABC TV.

The Special Broadcasting Service, originally a group of radio stations broadcasting government information to ethnic minorities in Sydney and Melbourne, began test transmissions on ABC in the two cities – mainly showing foreign-language programming on Sunday mornings.

=== Television and programming in the 1980s ===
The country's second national public broadcaster, the Special Broadcasting Service, launched Channel 0/28 in Sydney and Melbourne in October 1980. The new station, aimed at Australia's growing multicultural population, placed a much heavier emphasis on subtitled or foreign-language content. The network expanded to cover Canberra and Goulburn in 1983, followed by Brisbane, Adelaide, Newcastle, Wollongong and the Gold Coast in June 1985. It is now available in most areas.

Although Australia had seen the introduction of the satellite in the 1960s, 1986 saw the introduction of a new, domestic satellite called AUSSAT. The Australian Broadcasting Corporation and other commercial broadcasters were able to broadcast to the more remote areas of Australia without needing to set up a new station, and by the end of 1986 the Australian Broadcasting Corporation were broadcasting both television and radio to remote areas of Australia. By 1980, commercial television in Australia accounted for 33% of all mainstream advertising; this was a significant rise from the introduction of television in 1960 when it was accountable for only 15% of advertising revenue.

The newly relaunched Network 10, with Rupert Murdoch controlling the flagship stations TEN-10 and ATV-10, aggressively challenged the long-held dominance of the Seven and Nine networks with the commissioning of several large-budget mini-series, many produced by the Kennedy-Miller partnership; the expansion of news and current affairs coverage; securing the exclusive Australian television rights to the 1984 and 1988 Summer Olympic Games; and a strong line-up of Hollywood blockbuster movies and mini-series. The 1980s were a huge step up for the Australian Broadcasting Corporation, sealing the contracts for both Live Aid and the 1986 Commonwealth Games, live from Edinburgh.

In 1983 a two-hour experiment was conducted, in which the Seven Network televised a series of 3D films.

The Australian soap opera Neighbours was first broadcast on the Seven Network on 18 March 1985. The show's storylines concern the domestic and professional lives of the people who live and work in the fictional suburb of Erinsborough, Melbourne. Seven decided to commission the show following the success of Watson's other soap opera, Sons and Daughters. Neighbours underperformed in the Sydney market and it struggled for four months before Seven cancelled it. The show was immediately bought by rival network, Ten. Ten began screening Neighbours on 20 January 1986. Neighbours has since become the longest-running series in Australian television and attained great success in the United Kingdom and launched the careers of several international stars, including Kylie Minogue, Guy Pearce, Russell Crowe, Natalie Imbruglia and Margot Robbie to name a few.

The soap opera Home and Away has been produced in Sydney by the Seven Network since July 1987. It premiered in January 1988 and is the second longest-running drama on Australian television, winning more than 30 Logie Awards. The show initially focused on the characters of Pippa and Tom Fletcher who ran the Summer Bay Caravan Park and lived there with a succession of foster children, most notably their adopted daughter Sally, played by Kate Ritchie. Other notable actors who have starred in the series include Heath Ledger, Julian McMahon and Naomi Watts.

The late 1980s saw the ownership changeover for many commercial and regional stations. Six main ownership groups emerged, three for commercial broadcasters and three for regional broadcasters This was the beginning of aggregation for Australian television.

=== Television and programming in the 1990s ===
The 1990s saw a boom in Australian-made drama, which included Halifax f.p., Stingers, Water Rats, SeaChange, All Saints, and the long running police drama Blue Heelers which ran from 1993 to 2006, one of the longest running Australian programs, equaling Homicide's record of 510 episodes; a record set two decades earlier. A number of successful comedy programs also aired during the 1990s, including Fast Forward, Full Frontal, The Late Show and Good News Week. Hey Hey It's Saturday ended its 28-year run in November 1999. One of the most significant developments in terms of high-quality Australian programming was the establishment by the Federal Government of the Commercial Television Production Fund. One of the most significant changes for regional television in Australia began in the 1990s with the introduction of aggregation. Instead of being covered by a single commercial channel, regional license areas would combine to provide two or three stations in line with metropolitan areas. As a result, most regional areas went from one to three channels, although some, particularly outside eastern states New South Wales, Victoria and Queensland, remained with two or even only one commercial station.

The first license area to aggregate was that of southern New South Wales, on 31 March 1989, followed by Queensland on 31 December 1990, northern New South Wales on 31 December 1991, Victoria on 1 January 1992, and Tasmania in 1994 (two stations only). Some areas too small to be properly aggregated, such as Darwin, Mildura or rural South Australia, however, either applied for a second license or introduced a supplementary second service run by the existing local station. Following aggregation in 1995, Sunshine Television was purchased by Seven Network Limited.

Community television was introduced to Sydney, Melbourne, Brisbane, Adelaide and Perth in 1994. The stations, which all broadcast on channel 31, were allocated long-term temporary licences until new legislation introduced in 1997 permitted permanent licences to be granted. Briz 31 was the first community television station to launch in Australia, on 31 July 1994. C31 Melbourne and Access 31 in Perth followed in 1994 and 1999 respectively, along with a number of other stations in some capital and regional cities. The most recent to launch was Sydney's TVS. Throughout the early 1990s, SBS TV coverage continued to expand to include the Latrobe Valley, Spencer Gulf, Darwin, northeast Tasmania, Cairns and Townsville.

During the 1990s the first subscription television services were introduced to Australia. The first license was issued to Galaxy Television, which started in 1993, providing services to most metropolitan areas by 1995. Other major providers include Foxtel, Optus Television, and Austar, all of which were introduced in 1995.

Subscription television allowed customers to have access to more channels. For example, PSN (later Fox Sports) was launched in 1995 and ESPN in 1996, featuring Super 12 (rugby union), NFL (American football) and NBA (basketball).

The advent of pay television in Australia resulted in the Super League war which was fought in and out of court during the mid-1990s by the News Ltd-backed Super League and Kerry Packer-backed Australian Rugby League organisations over broadcasting rights, and ultimately control of the top-level professional rugby league football competition of Australasia. This resulted in the greatest and most costly set-piece confrontation to shake the corporate landscape of Australia.

Galaxy folded in 1998 and was subsequently absorbed by Foxtel. Despite recent growth, subscription television in Australia still has relatively few subscribers.

=== Television and programming in the 2000s ===
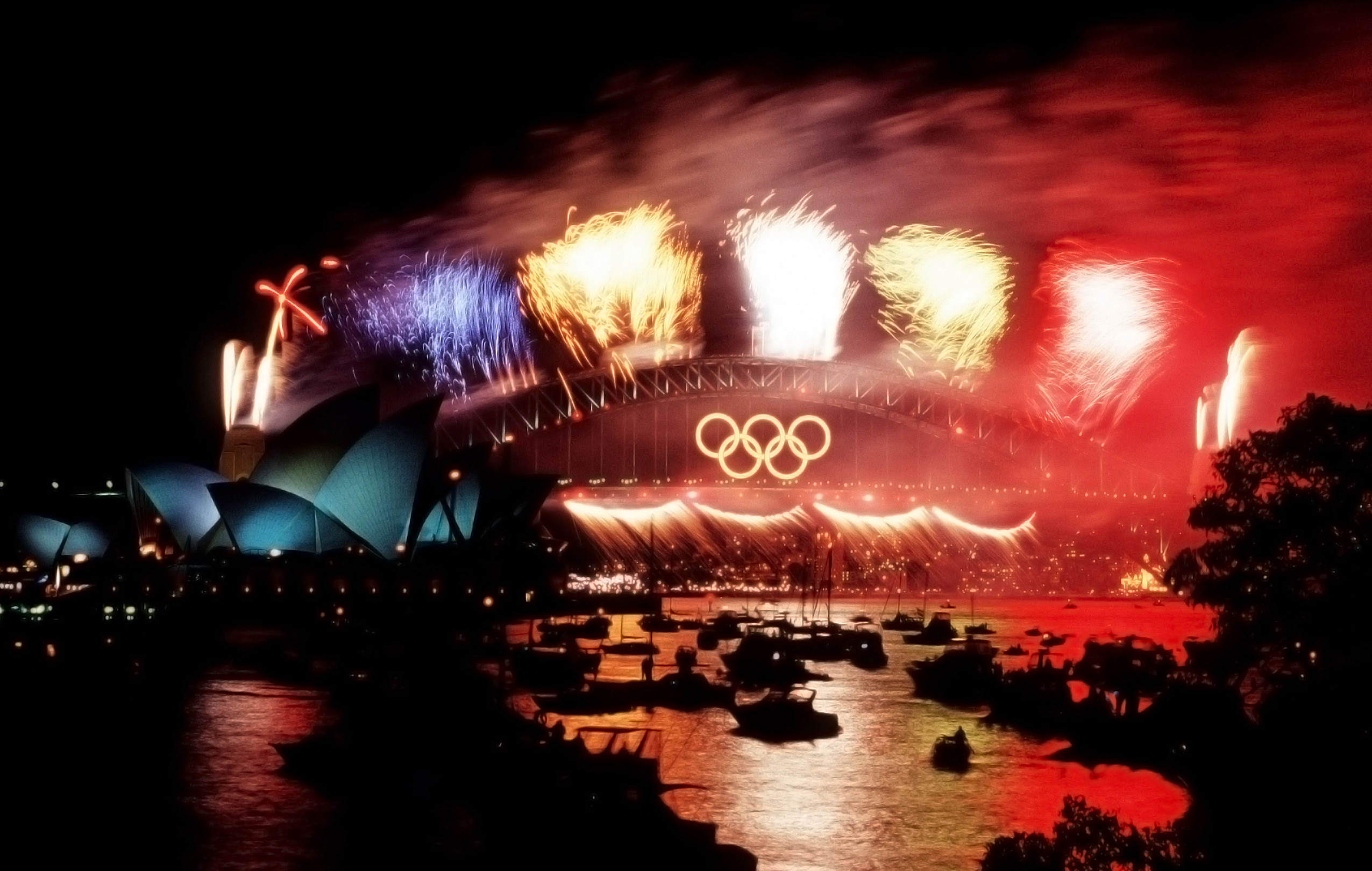
The Seven Network's telecast of the Sydney 2000 Summer Olympics' opening ceremony was one of the highest-rating programs in Australian television history.

The 2000 Summer Olympics resulted in huge ratings for its broadcaster (the event was hosted in Sydney) for the Seven Network – over 6.5 million Australians watched the telecast of opening and closing ceremonies, which were amongst the most-watched programs in television history and helped Seven defeat the Nine Network in ratings terms for the first time in more than two decades. The broadcast also ran on the short-lived C7 Sport subscription channel. The Dream with Roy and HG was a sports/comedy talk show, broadcast every night during the Sydney 2000 (and subsequent Salt Lake 2002 and Athens 2004 Olympics) presented by Australian comedy duo Roy and HG which achieved great popularity during the Games.

The turn of the millennium introduced digital television to Australia, as well as the transition to widescreen standard-definition and high-definition television production. Community stations also began to receive permanent transmitter licences, replacing temporary licences that were renewed yearly. At this time it was thought that allowing Commercial Multicasting would be detrimental so the publicly owned networks (ABC and SBS) were the only networks that were allowed to create new digital SD Channels. This was only revised after Digital Television Uptake was not as high as expected in many areas, and from 1 January 2009, Network 10, Nine and Seven were allowed to create alternative SD channels.

Many successful Australian shows were created during the 2000s, including ABC comedies like Kath & Kim, CNNNN, Summer Heights High, Spicks and Specks and The Chaser's War on Everything, Network 10's Skithouse, Russell Coight's All Aussie Adventures, Thank God You're Here, H_{2}O: Just Add Water & The Secret Life of Us, which led to the creation of many local versions throughout the world, and the growth of reality television, especially Big Brother Australia and Australian Idol. Australian content on subscription television also grew, with shows such as the Logie Award winning Love My Way. Enough Rope with Andrew Denton, a television interview show broadcast on ABC, aired from 2003 to 2008.

Amongst the new digital 'multichannels', one of the earliest was the SBS World News Channel in 2002, providing news bulletins in languages other than English. In 2003 Tasmanian Digital Television launched, providing Tasmanian viewers a third commercial station, and nationally available stations Fly TV and the ABC Kids launched, later to be eventually shut down due to funding issues and replaced in 2005 by ABC TV Plus. Mildura Digital Television, similar to TDT, launched at the start of 2006. Sydney also began testing datacasting transmissions with Digital 44 in 2003. While digital television boomed in areas that received a third channel and with the subscription television services, growth in other areas has been slow, with analogue shut-down dates pushed back several times. A number of new community stations were also opened, including C31 Adelaide in April 2004 and Television Sydney in February 2006.

In October 2005, Network 10 announced that the morning show entitled Good Morning Australia would be cancelled at the end of the year, after a 14-year run. Although Bert Newton was offered ongoing employment at Network 10, he joined the Nine Network to host the short-lived game show Bert's Family Feud, until 23 May 2007 when the program was axed.

The Nine Network, the traditional ratings leader, suffered ratings losses by the mid-2000s, losing out to the Seven Network, which became the most popular Australian network by early 2007, thanks to its "Seven in '07" campaign. This was not the only loss by the network: the death of its CEO Kerry Packer in late 2005 led to network personality Eddie McGuire becoming the head of the network, and the network lost AFL broadcast rights to the Seven and Ten networks in the largest Australian television rights deal in history, worth A$780 million. In mid-2007, National Indigenous Television launched as Australia's 'third public broadcaster', after the ABC and SBS, replacing Indigenous Community Television on the Optus Aurora remote satellite service.

==== High-definition TV ====
The move to high-definition television broadcasting came to the forefront when Network 10 announced its intentions to create the first dedicated HD multichannel 10 HD on 14 September 2007 with a December 2007 Launch date.

Although 10 HD was initially expected to be the first new commercial television channel in metropolitan areas of Australia since 1988, it was instead beaten to the punch by 7HD. Following the announcement by the Ten Network, Network Seven also announced its previously hidden plans to launch a dedicated HD channel on 15 September 2007 and pushed the launch date forward to 10 October. 7HD was the first dedicated HD multichannel launched, 2 months earlier than the Channel 10 equivalent. The Nine Network's move to a HD channel was considered sluggish by industry insiders, taking until March 2008. The Network was more excited by its plans to introduce a new SD channel in 2009 called 9Go!, which is when digital multicasting restrictions were scheduled to be lifted from the commercial stations. 9Go! was released to the public on 9 August, spelling the end of 9HD which was replaced by the previous HD version of Nine.

2009 also saw the launch of four other channels, 7two, a general entertainment channel, SBS Viceland available in SD, ABC Me, a dedicated children's television channel available in SD, and 10 Bold, a dedicated 24-hour sport channel and a subsidiary of Network 10 available in both HD and SD, replacing Ten HD. ABC Me, unlike commercial channels, is not constrained by local content quotas.

=== Television and programming in the 2010s ===
In the early stages of the 2010s, several governmental analysts observed that commercial networks were having trouble making the transition to digital television and subsequently, a $250m rebate was implemented on their licensing fees. The government-funded stations, ABC and SBS, received increased funding in the closing stages of the 2000s to enable them to make the transition to digital TV. Meanwhile, the community station C31 received no government assistance or funding to make the transition; this still remains a source of controversy.

Other issues were noted such as the increased cost of producing local content on commercial networks. For example: it costs roughly $800,000 to produce one hour of local content such as Underbelly and Packed to the Rafters, in comparison to a mere $100,000 to purchase one hour of the US produced Two and a Half Men, the former example screening very often during the off ratings period 2009–10. The cost disparity has led many to question the viability of commercial networks in the future of delivering and investing in locally produced content and has also brought their financial arrangements with business and industry groups into question. Meanwhile, ABC and SBS quickly began producing very successful local content with shows such as Review, Lawrence Leung's Choose Your Own Adventure, Hungry Beast and many more publicly funded local programs, produced in Australia, with Australian cast and crews, adding to the increasing health of Australian film and television industries.

During January 2010, the ABC announced its long-awaited 24-hour news channel, ABC News to launch in July 2010. It will broadcast on the current ABC HD channel and according to the ABC, "Australia's first free-to-air 24-hour television news channel". Following technical issues at ABC's new playout facility MediaHub, the ABC News launch date was pushed to 22 July 2010. ABC News began to broadcast a three-minute loop promo on Channel 24 on 6 July 2010.

On 19 August 2010, the Seven Network announced their third digital channel, 7mate, which replaced 7HD. 7mate is aimed at males between 16 and 49, and launched with the AFL Grand Final on 25 September. The Nine Network has also launched a third digital channel called 9Gem, broadcasting only in HD and replacing 9HD. 9Gem is targeted at middle-aged women. On 26 August, Network 10 announced their plans for a channel to replace One SD. The new channel, 10 Peach, is aimed at a youth audience and carries flagship TEN programming including Neighbours. Eleven launched on 11 January 2011.

In 2011, the Seven Network created history by winning all 40 weeks of a television ratings season for the first time since OzTAM was established in 2001.

On 12 December 2012, NITV started its free-to-air broadcasts under new ownership of SBS.

On 10 December 2013, the analogue TV shutdown completed all around Australia.

On 19 August 2015, then Communications Minister Malcolm Turnbull introduced a bill retracting the legal obligation for broadcasters to broadcast their primary channel in standard definition.

On 29 August 2015, Racing.com was launched owned by Racing Victoria and Seven West Media.

In October 2015, the Nine Network announced their fourth digital channel, 9Life. Launching on 26 November, 9Life is a dedicated lifestyle and reality channel on Channel 94. Around the same time, 9HD was relaunched on Channel 90.

On 28 February 2016, the Seven Network launched a fifth digital channel, 7flix, which is a dedicated movie and entertainment channel on Channel 76.

On 2 March 2016, Network 10 relaunched 10 HD on Channel 13.

On 10 May 2016, the Seven Network relaunched 7HD in Melbourne and Adelaide on Channel 70. On 16 December of the same year, it was relaunched on the same channel in Sydney, Brisbane and Perth.

=== Television and programming in the 2020s ===
With the rapid spread of COVID-19 in the early months of 2020, television production in Australia (as it did worldwide) suffered greatly due to health requirements; many programs such as Neighbours and Home and Away were forced to suspend filming in an effort to keep their respective cast and crews safe from infection. From the first (of many) 'health lockdowns' until the later months of 2021, many studios were closed or reorganised to suit the legal requirements for spread prevention. As vaccination rates against the virus increased, many of the studios began to reopen and production rates have increased, with Neighbours and Home and Away restarting production in October/November 2021.

== Broadcasting ==
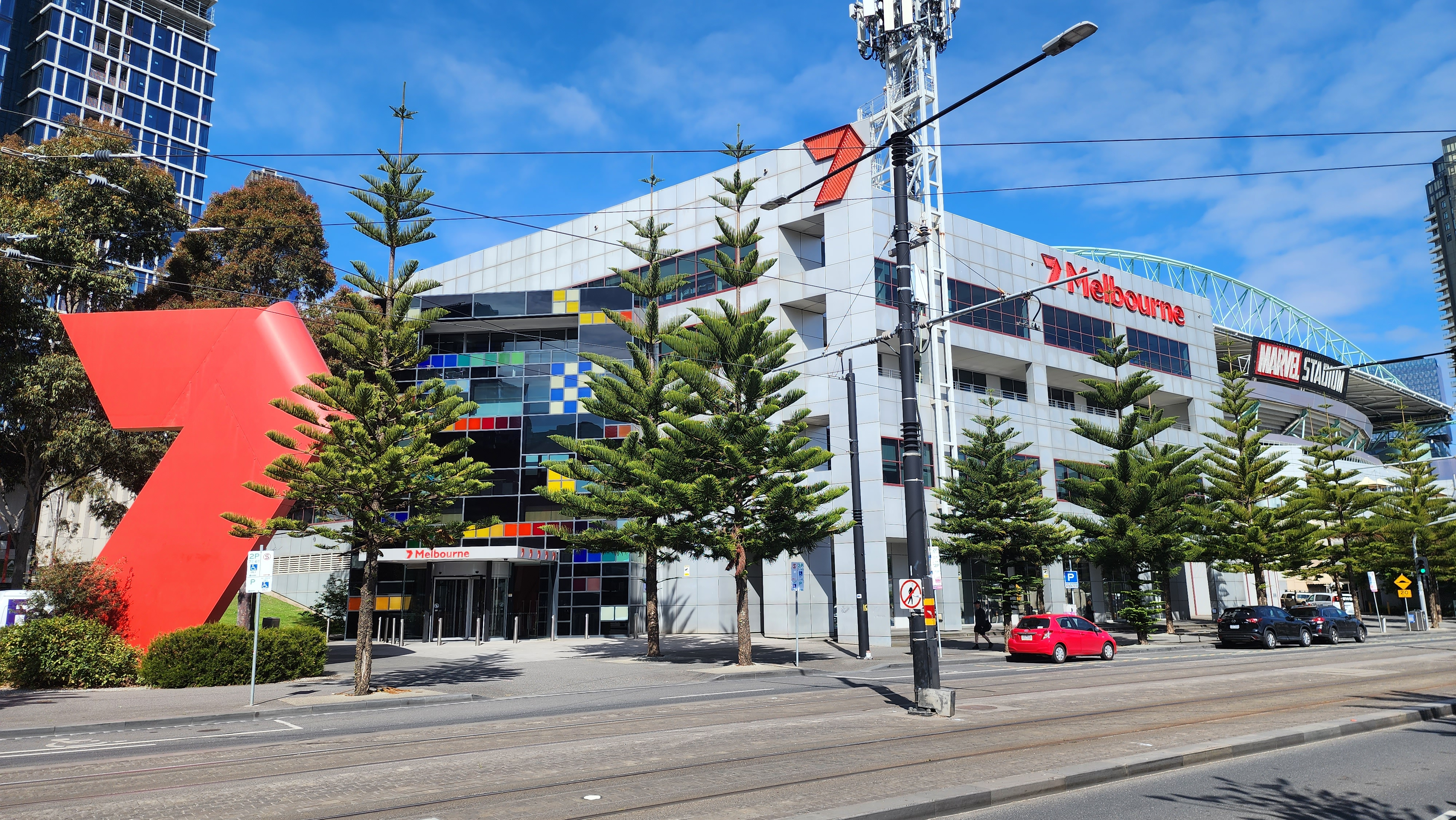
Seven Network's broadcast centre in the Melbourne Docklands area

Television broadcasting in Australia is currently available as digital, colour television, via a range of means including terrestrial, satellite, and cable television services. Both free-to-air and subscription channels/networks are available. Analogue television has been phased out, with the last service being switched off in December 2013.

In most areas, there is a choice of three free-to-air commercial broadcasters as well as two national public broadcasters, the Australian Broadcasting Corporation and the Special Broadcasting Service. A third, recently established, National Indigenous Television service is available in many remote areas.

Commercial television is dominated by three major metropolitan-based networks, the Seven Network, Network 10, which own stations in Sydney, Melbourne, Brisbane, Adelaide, Perth, and the Nine Network which owns stations in Sydney, Melbourne, Brisbane, Darwin, Adelaide and Perth. In addition to its metropolitan assets, Seven owns regional stations in New South Wales, Victoria, Western Australia, the ACT, Queensland and Tasmania, and Nine owns and operates its regional station NBN in Northern NSW and the Gold Coast.

Regional television in Australia consists of independently owned networks 'affiliated' to metropolitan stations. WIN Television is the country's largest regional broadcaster in terms of population reach, followed by Imparja Television. Previously, Southern Cross Austereo and the Prime Media Group operated regional affiliate stations throughout the county. Some regional centres have three commercial broadcasters, while others — such as regional Western Australia and remote central & eastern Australia — have two, and others — such as Mount Gambier and Broken Hill — have only one commercial broadcaster. In two-broadcaster markets, the two incumbent commercial broadcasters applied for and were granted a third, digital-only license. In single-broadcaster markets, each incumbent commercial broadcaster was granted a second, and later a third license, to provide additional programming. This has resulted in the establishment of a number of channels including Tasmanian Digital Television, Mildura Digital Television, Darwin Digital Television and West Digital Television.

Subscription television in Australia is provided in most areas by Foxtel with Optus Television also serving Sydney, Melbourne, and Brisbane. A number of smaller operators including SelecTV, TransACT, UBI World TV, and Neighbourhood Cable provide niche or local services. Most operators provide the same or similar channels. There are few genuine local channels and few independent channels. One exception is the World Movies channel owned by a consortium including SBS Television and companies owned by Kerry Stokes and the Australian Radio Network.

Community television progressively launched between the 1980s to the 2000s. The sector is represented nationally by the Community Broadcasting Association of Australia. Community stations include TVS, C31 Melbourne, 31 Brisbane, C31 Adelaide and Access 31; many recognisable mainstream personalities originated from community television, including Rove McManus and Wil Anderson and Kayne Tremills

== Cable television ==
Cable television has been available in Australia since the mid-1990s, with Galaxy TV being the first. It became insolvent in 1998, due to decreasing popularity after the launch of Foxtel and Austar in May 1995, two cable services that offered more variety than Galaxy TV. Foxtel commenced by supplying programs to Galaxy's subscribers on an interim basis. In 1999 Foxtel was able to significantly boost its customer base by acquiring Galaxy TV's subscribers from the Australis Media liquidator and commenced offering its services on a satellite television platform. There is currently one major subscription television provider in Australia, Foxtel. Foxtel bought Austar in 2012 and has now completed the merger of its operations. Other minor providers include TransACT, Neighbourhood Cable, and SelecTV.

In the capital cities, cable is the more predominant form of pay television distribution. In regional areas or in new or outskirted areas of cities, satellite is far more common.

Due to its history, financial backing, and market dominance, most local versions of channels are either owned directly by Foxtel or through related companies.

In terms of coverage, Foxtel's cable network covers parts of Sydney, Melbourne, Brisbane, Adelaide, and Perth. Optus's network covers small parts of Sydney, Melbourne, and Brisbane, though its restrictive subscription rules mean that many people living in apartments or confined living areas may be unable to connect.

Austar (now Foxtel) is available by satellite in most of regional and rural Australia, but does have a small cable network in the city of Darwin. TransACT is only available in Canberra, where a custom cable network was developed. A similar situation used to exist in Perth where a small area was covered by Bright Telecommunications (though they closed down after lack of funding) as well in parts of Geelong, Ballarat and Mildura that are reached by Neighbourhood Cable.

== Satellite television ==
The value of television receiver imports ($million per month) since 1989.

Satellite television in Australia has proven to be a far more feasible option than cable television, perhaps due to the vast distances between population centres, (although Canada, which also has large distances between population centres, has a relatively high cable television penetration rate). The first service to come online in Australia was Galaxy, which was later taken over by cable television giant Foxtel, which now operates both cable and satellite services to all state capital cities (except Darwin and Hobart) and the whole of Western Australia. Its main metropolitan rival was Optus Vision, while rural areas are served by Austar, both of which just rebroadcast Foxtel as of 2005. In 2006 SelecTV began operating, aiming at providing comparatively low-cost packages and catering to specialised market segments.

== Internet television ==
Internet television in Australia is the digital distribution of movies and television content via the Internet. In Australia, internet television is provided by a number of generalist, subscription-based streaming service providers, in addition to several niche providers that focus on specific genres. Australia's five major free-to-air television networks also all offer catch up TV of previously broadcast content to watch via their webpages and apps, and a number of ISPs and other companies offer IPTV – the live streaming of television channels sourced from Australia and elsewhere.

== Broadcasting programming synopsis ==
Australia has produced numerous notable television series and miniseries, with the most prominent programs coming from the comedy, police, and medical drama genres.

=== Serials and dramas ===
One of the earliest Australian police drama series was Homicide, produced in Melbourne by Crawford Productions, widely viewed as having revolutionised Australian television drama production. It was followed by Division 4 and Matlock Police, which also enjoyed great popularity and long runs both locally and overseas. Other successful police drama series have included Cop Shop, Police Rescue, Blue Heelers, Water Rats and Stingers. Medical dramas have also proved popular with audiences, including series such as A Country Practice, The Flying Doctors, GP and All Saints.

=== Mini-serials ===
Notable miniseries have included Against the Wind, All the Rivers Run, Bodyline, Brides of Christ, The Dismissal and The Timeless Land, and in more recent times Curtin, Bastard Boys and The Slap.

=== Soap opera ===
Australian soap opera success began with Bellbird in 1967 which was a moderate but consistent success. Following this the huge success of Number 96 in 1972 prompted creation of the similar The Box in 1974. These serials were all cancelled in 1977. Following this successful serials included The Young Doctors, The Sullivans, Prisoner, Sons and Daughters, Neighbours and Home and Away. This later group were also screened internationally, finding particular success in the United Kingdom.

=== Comedy ===
Comedy series have included The Aunty Jack Show, The Paul Hogan Show, The Norman Gunston Show, and more recently The D-Generation, Frontline, The Glass House, Bogan Hunters, Summer Heights High, Please Like Me and popular series Thank God You're Here, which has since been adapted to a number of countries around the world, and already several of them have brought in creators and stars of shows like Kath & Kim to help produce, direct, star, or serve as consultants on their versions.

=== Scheduling ===
The scheduling for each network is quite diverse: while the Seven Network, Nine Network, and affiliates have an hour of news and current affairs at 6:00 pm, Network 10 has news at 5:00 pm while ABC has news at 7:00 pm and SBS has world news at 6:30 pm. The primetime slot in Australia runs from 6:00 pm to midnight, with the most popular programming shown from around 7:30 pm to 10:30 pm.

Many programs shown in these times on commercial networks are taken from American television, while ABC has a mixture of Australian and British productions. SBS, as a multicultural broadcaster, shows a range of programs produced locally and overseas in a number of languages. Imported programming has typically been shown months after its debut in the United States or the United Kingdom, however, in recent times networks have begun to air programs within hours or days of their overseas counterparts.

Seven and Nine have rival breakfast shows that run from 5:30–9:00 am while 10 airs repeated shows from the previous day at 6:00 am–8:30 am, followed by morning shows on all three networks until midday. ABC now broadcasts a breakfast news show (ABC News Breakfast) while on ABC TV Plus and ABC Me there are children's programming, also on 9Go! and Nickelodeon, Australian children's programming currently airs on 7flix, 9Go! and Nickelodeon, meanwhile on SBS foreign-language bulletins are shown for most of the morning, followed by foreign-language films and documentaries.

Most scheduling is consistent across Australia's three time zones – this means that South Australia and the Northern Territory sees programming half an hour behind Australian Eastern Time, while in Western Australia programs are seen two hours behind. When daylight saving is in effect, because it is only partially observed, Queensland gets programming one hour later, Northern Territory sees it 90 minutes behind and Western Australia receives its shows three hours behind. Consequently, many national news bulletins shown live to eastern states are seen on considerable delay in Western Australia (with the notable exception of The Midday Report, of which a second edition is produced for WA). The time delay can often deny viewers in central and western areas the opportunity to participate in interactive shows such as The Voice.

One exception to this rule are subscription channels, which always run on Australian Eastern Time regardless of the local service or time zone. The recent introduction of timeshift channels delayed two hours for all viewers, particularly on Foxtel, allowed WA viewers to see programs in sync with other states during standard time (although due to WA's non-observance of daylight saving, programs air one hour ahead during this time). However, ABC News is live across the nation with no delay, the only free-to-air television channel to do this.

== News and current affairs ==
=== News ===
Both national public broadcasters, the ABC and SBS, produce news services. The ABC provides both local and national news bulletins in the form of ABC News at 5:30pm, 7pm and The Midday Report, presented from Sydney and state capitals. SBS broadcasts a nightly hour-long World News Australia bulletin at 6.30pm, followed by a later, half-hour edition at 10.30pm.

Higher ratings for earlier bulletins from commercial broadcasters including the Seven Network and Nine Network have prompted fierce ratings competition. For most years up until the mid-1990s Nine News was traditionally the highest-rating news service in Australia, but in 2005 it was overtaken by Seven News before it regained the lead on a national basis in 2013.

Seven News produces Seven Early News, Seven Morning News, Seven News at 4 and Seven News local bulletins in Sydney, Melbourne, Brisbane, Adelaide, and Perth.The network's news bulletins and breakfast program Sunrise compete directly with the Nine Network's offerings, which include Today and Nine Morning News, Nine Afternoon News and Nine News local bulletins. 10 News currently produces a local hour-long weeknight bulletin of 10 News and on weekends it airs a national hour-long bulletin.

In Australia, there are two local 24-hour news channels. The ABC News channel is Australia's only free-to-air news channel. ABC News launched on 22 July 2010 as ABC News 24 and it features all of ABCs news and current affairs programs. ABC News is available on digital channel 24. Sky News Australia is Australia's second news channel that is only available on Foxtel, Optus TV and BINGE. The subscription based television channel draws on the resources of its shareholders news services, using content from Seven News, Nine News and Sky News from the United Kingdom, as well as reporters based in Sydney, Canberra, and Melbourne.

A number of regional television networks produce news services. WIN Television produces WIN News bulletins for 14 regional markets in parts of New South Wales, Victoria, Queensland, South Australia, Tasmania and Western Australia. NBN (now run by WIN Television) produces a bulletin on weeknights, in a half-hour long format presented from Newcastle and seen across northern New South Wales. Seven produces local 30 minute news bulletins in regional New South Wales, Victoria, Queensland and Western Australia. Seven Tasmania produces a local hour long bulletin of 7NEWS for Tasmania from the stations Launceston studios, airing 7 nights a week.

In addition Sky News Australia has a regional free-to-air news channel called Sky News Regional on digital channels 53 and 56 in partnership with Network 10 and Australian News Channel on their TV stations. Viewer Access Satellite Television launched 14 bulletin channels with over 30 bulletins and a regional news menu on channel 4 showing all the channels on WIN, NBN, 7 regional and 10 regional.

=== Current affairs ===
Current affairs programming is shown in a broad range of formats, ranging between tabloid-style current affairs shows to investigative programs such as Four Corners.

ABC has had a long history of producing current affairs programs, including the award-winning This Day Tonight, the first regular current affairs program to be shown on Australian television and a training ground for many of Australia's best-known journalists. This Day Tonight was axed in 1978, however in the mid-1980s The 7.30 Report was launched in state-based editions (these were combined into a national program hosted by Kerry O'Brien in 1995). Four Corners, first seen in 1961, an investigative documentary series modelled on the BBC's Panorama, has also won many awards and broken stories previously not covered by other media outlets.

Other current affairs programs include news and analysis program Lateline, 7.30, Foreign Correspondent, Insiders and Offsiders.

SBS also shows a number of current affairs programs, such as Dateline, the country's longest-running international current affairs program, launched in 1984. Insight, originally conceived in 1999 as a domestic current affairs program, is a discussion forum focussing on a single issue. SBS's Indigenous Media Unit produces another program titled Living Black, which covers issues relevant to Australia's indigenous community.

On the Nine Network, A Current Affair, first shown in 1971 airs Monday — Saturday is the networks flagship current affairs program. On Sundays, 60 Minutes features a number of stories produced both locally and from its US counterpart.

Channel 10 launched 10 News+ in 2025, as an hour long current affairs programme to replace long running panel show The Project. 10 News+ was reduced to an air time of 30 minutes in 2026.

On subscription television, Sky News Australia airs a number of news commentary and analysis shows such as Agenda, Sportsline, Sky Business Report, and Sky News Eco Report. A local version of Sky News Weather Channel was launched in 1999, joined in 2006 by Fox Sports News, a 24-hour sports news channel. Squawk Australia, a business news program shown from 6.00am, is seen on CNBC Asia.

== Indigenous television ==
In the 21st century, and especially the 2010s, programmes and series by and about Indigenous Australians proliferated. The Circuit (2007) was an early example; Redfern Now, 8MMM Aboriginal Radio, The Gods of Wheat Street (2014), Ready for This, Cleverman, Black Comedy, The Warriors, Kiki & Kitty, Total Control, KGB, Little J & Big Cuz, Mystery Road were all well received. Shari Sebbens commented that a "golden age" of Indigenous television is here.

The last episode of the second series of Get Krack!n, featuring Miranda Tapsell and Nakkiah Lui and co-written by Lui, trended on Twitter, outraged right wing commentator Andrew Bolt, and was widely lauded as hilarious, ground-breaking, hard-hitting satire.

National Indigenous Television (NITV) is (since 2012) a national, free-to-air channel dedicated to Indigenous stories, news, films and issues, with programming produced largely by Indigenous people, funded through SBS. In early 2016, it refreshed its brand and revamped its schedule, with an increased focus on its central charter, Indigenous news and current affairs.

== Ratings ==
Australian prime time television ratings (major cities)
Network	2008	2009	2010	2014
ABC	14.2%	14.0%	13.8%	14.2%
Seven	24.2%	23.0%	23.5%	24.8%
Nine	21.9%	21.9%	22.7%	23.8%
Ten	17.0%	18.4%	17.3%	14.6%
SBS	4.6%	4.8%	4.6%	4.2%
Foxtel	15.5%	15.9%	15.5%	16.1%

Television ratings in Australia are collected by three main organisations: OzTAM in metropolitan areas, Regional TAM in regional areas serviced by three commercial television networks, and in areas with two commercial networks, Nielsen Media Research Australia.

Ratings are collected for 40 weeks during the year, excluding a two-week break during Easter and ten weeks over summer. The majority of locally produced comedy and drama on commercial networks is shown during the ratings period.

For many years up until the mid-nineties, the Nine Network had been the ratings leader in Australia, typically followed by the Seven Network and Network 10. Subscription television and the two national broadcasters, ABC and in particular SBS, due to its special-interest nature, typically attract fewer viewers than the three commercial networks. Network 10, due to its programming line-up, has traditionally been the market leader for younger viewers.

In 2007, the Seven Network overtook its rival Nine Network in terms of average viewers, and in 2011, it became the first television network since OzTam's launch in 2001 to win all 40 weeks in a ratings season. As of 2016, it has won the last ten ratings seasons consecutively. ABC has also, since the early 2000s, seen ratings (as well as audience reach) as a major performance indicator. The Nine Network has, in the past, aggressively marketed its long-time ratings dominance through its promotional campaign "Still the One", which they no longer use.

== Regulation ==
Content on Australian television is regulated by the Australian Communications and Media Authority. All codes of practice submitted to the Australian Communications and Media Authority are reviewed by the public prior to acceptance. There are different regulations for different types of content, and the main categories are divided up into Australian content, children's content, commercial broadcasting, community broadcasting, public broadcasting, and subscription television.

The regulations in place define what a broadcaster may put on-air, the time(s) of day they are allowed to broadcast specific material, and what advertisements are shown in relation to these criteria. In essence, the Australian Communications and Media Authority controls what content is shown, what time(s) of day it is shown, and who controls what is shown (i.e.: international media as opposed to Australian media).

Genre restrictions imposed by the Australian government on digital multi-channeling were lifted along with the media ownership laws passed through the Parliament of Australia on 18 October 2006. Digital-only multichannels in Australia were previously limited in the subjects they could cover, with programming identified as comedy, drama, national news, sport or entertainment, prohibited from broadcast.

== See also ==
- Digital television in Australia
- High-definition television in Australia
- Internet television in Australia
- Subscription television in Australia
- History of television
- List of digital television channels in Australia
