= Movie Network Channels =

Australian television movie service

- Country: Australia

Programming
- Language: English
- Picture format: PAL; HDTV 1080i
- Timeshift service: Movie Two, Starpics 2

Ownership
- Owner: Movie Network Channels Pty Ltd (Warner Bros./HBO, Disney, MGM Holdings & Village Roadshow)
- Sister channels: Movie One; FMC Family; Starpics 1 Movie Extra; Movie Greats

History
- Launched: 20 September 1995
- Closed: 1 June 2016
- Former names: The Movie Network (1995–1997)

Availability (at time of closure)

Streaming media
- Foxtel Download: Movie Action; Movie Comedy; Movie Drama

Movie Network Channels was an Australian premium television movie service that consisted of five original channels (Movie One, Movie Extra, Movie Greats, Family Movie Channel, Starpics 1), two SD timeshifts (Movie Two, Starpics 2) and three HD simulcasts (Movie One HD, Starpics 1 HD, Starpics 2 HD). Its main competitor was Showtime. Movie Network channels were originally only available through Optus TV, who produced and part-owned the channels prior to 1 January 2000.

Through content sharing agreements, Movie Network Channels became available through Austar in January 1999 and Foxtel in December 2002. Movie Network is also available on Neighbourhood Cable, SelecTV and TransACT. The channels were owned, operated and programmed by Warner Bros., Disney, Metro-Goldwyn-Mayer and Village Roadshow. In addition to films from these studios, the network also had access to films from DreamWorks and Australian distributor Hopscotch Films.

On 15 November 2009, the network expanded with three additional (including 1 timeshift) channels and 3 HD simulcasts (including 1 timeshift). In addition, a new website was launched and a unified slogan for the overall network - "All Together Better!".

From 2009 until 2012, Movie Extra was the naming rights sponsor for the Tropfest short film festival.

On 6 December 2012, an announcement was made that Movie Network would cease broadcasting from 1 June 2016. This came in the wake of Foxtel purchasing the Showtime Movie Channels from the Premium Movie Partnership to take movies in-house to save on costs. Negotiations were taking place between Foxtel and Movie Network, but it is believed that one or more of the Movie Network owners began negotiations with Foxtel for their movie rights, causing the acquisition of Movie Network to fall through. On 9 December 2012, it was announced that Movie Network and Showtime (with the exception of Showcase) would be replaced with a new line-up of Foxtel branded movie channels to be named Foxtel Movies

== Channels ==
Movies were typically shown for a year, and made appearances on at least one or more of the network's channels during their run.

=== Movie One ===
Movie One was the network's premiere channel for blockbusters from studios such as Warner Bros., Walt Disney Studios Motion Pictures, MGM, Becker Entertainment, Village Roadshow and Steven Spielberg's DreamWorks plus an array of independent studios and launched 20 September 1995. Prior to 7 September 1997 this channel was named The Movie Network. Movie One (along with timeshift service, Movie Two) also offers a free interactive movie service called Redspace. Every month Redspace allows digital viewers to play a quiz, read facts about the movie or watch video packages such as behind-the-scenes, interviews and other features. Movies that air on this channel are released 2005-onwards. An HD simulcast launched on 15 November 2009.

=== Movie Two ===
Movie Two was the timeshift service of Movie One where it broadcasts Movie One with a two-hour delay and launched 2004.

=== Movie Extra ===
Movie Extra launched on 7 September 1997. The channel showed a mix of international and Australian films along with premieres of edgier films and documentaries. More recently the channel had started screening American or British television series such as: Five Days, Dirt, The L Word and Mad Men. Movies that aired on this channel were mainly from the late 90s and early 2000s.

==== Movie Extra Webfest ====
The Movie Extra Webfest was an annual trailer-making event.

The winners of the inaugural 2011 Webfest were Henry and Aaron with their series Henry & Aaron’s 7 Steps to Superstardom.

The winner of the 2012 Webfest competition, Event Zero premiered on 22 May 2012. Event Zero stars actors Zoe Carides, Valentino Del Toro, Harry Pavlidis and Steve Davis.

=== Movie Greats ===
Movie Greats showed films from the back catalogues of the studios. Often there were themed months, or marathons of movies. Classic movies are shown on this channel, which ranges from between the 1930s up until the mid-1990s and launched 20 September 1995. The channel adopted the slogans "Movies that move you" and "Movies for me" from 15 November 2009.

=== Family Movie Channel (FMC) ===

Family Movie Channel was dedicated to Family Movies and was launched on 15 November 2009. The channel shows movie rated G and PG, along with "light" M rated movies. Premieres were on Saturday evenings.

=== STARPICS ===

Starpics was dedicated to double features of movies starring the same person. It has the slogan "Movies you know, actors you love", and launched on 15 November 2009. The channel has a timeshift channel, with both having HD simulcasts.

=== Download Channels for Foxtel subscribers ===
Foxtel subscribers to Movie Network channels are able to download movies to their Windows PC from 3 download channels.

The 3 channels are Movie Action, Movie Comedy, and Movie Drama. Content is often changed and is exclusive to the Foxtel download service.

=== MovieBox on FetchTV ===
In June 2010, the Movie Network channels launched MovieBox, a subscription on-demand movie service for Fetch TV with movies from the Movie Network's partner studios. The service offers a new movie each day, with instant access to 30 movies at any given time and the ability to pause, re-wind, fast forward and repeat view for up to 30 days.

The movies are included as part of the FetchTV basic subscription package, and show on a customer's TV via the FetchTV set top box.

Even though Movie Network Channels ceased broadcasting their channels, MovieBox is still being updated with new movies every day.
