= Galaxy (Australian television) =

Former cable and satellite television broadcaster

Galaxy Television
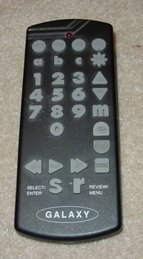
- A Galaxy remote control
- Industry: Subscription television
- Founded: 1993
- Fate: Bankruptcy
- Headquarters: Sydney, Australia

Galaxy is a former provider of pay television programming in Australia via satellite and wireless cable (microwave) delivery methods.

Galaxy was founded in 1993. Galaxy operated:

- A National Centre (purposely built-now Lockheed Martin Australia)
- A purpose-built Production Studio based in Pyrmont Sydney (subsequently operated by Channel 10).
- Installation service Centres located in each state.

Galaxy began test broadcasting on 1 January 1995 via microwave transmission, making it the first provider of pay-TV services in the country. It was officially launched on Australia Day (26 January). At launch only two channels were fully operational, the local Premier Sports and international news channel ANBC. Digital satellite broadcasts began in September 1995 with new generation Digital Decoder's manufactured and imported from the United Kingdom.

Galaxy was a joint venture between Continental Century Pay-TV and Australis Media. Each held licenses allowing them to provide four channels of satellite delivered television

Continental Century Pay-TV and Australis Media held exclusive licenses to broadcast pay-TV in Australia via satellite until 1997. Their main competitors were Foxtel and Optus Vision, both of which operated separate cable networks. The Galaxy channel package was franchised to CETV (Later Austar) and East Coast Television in regional areas.

At its peak, there were around 120,000 Galaxy subscribers. The service ceased shortly after Australis Media went into liquidation on 18 May 1998.

== History ==
In January 1992, the Government of Australia called tenders for Australia's first pay-TV licenses. Surprisingly, the first licence was purchased not by one of the major media players but by an entrepreneur, Albert Hadid, who quickly onsold it for a rumoured $33 million profit. The licenses ultimately ended up in the hands of Continental Century Pay-TV, a joint venture between Australian venture capitalist CVC and US cable company Century Communications (now part of Charter Communications) and Australis Media, an upstart company in which TCI and Guinness Peat Group were major shareholders. Australis paid a total of A$333 million for the satellite and microwave licenses they would require to launch a pay-TV service to be branded Galaxy.

Galaxy secured contracts with three major Hollywood studios –Sony Pictures Motion Picture Group, Universal Studios and Paramount Pictures (the latter two both partners on a joint venture, United International Pictures)– for the exclusive first-run rights to broadcast their film and TV product on its Galaxy service. The output of these studios formed three channels – Showtime, Encore and TV1 – that would become the mainstay of Galaxy's programming.

After the remaining output from the major studios was purchased by Optus Vision, Galaxy's other competitor, the News Corporation and Telstra owned Foxtel, was forced into an embarrassing deal to purchase content from Australis at a reported cost of A$4.5 billion over 25 years.

Despite this lucrative deal, the financial situation at Australis was troubling. The installation cost of equipment was high (reportedly around $500 for a microwave antenna and $1000 for a satellite dish), forcing them to greatly subsidise installation costs.

The demand for Galaxy TV and its new Microwave channels (albeit limited) was overwhelming.

National centre waiting boards at the time regularly flashed 99 calls waiting -it's limited) with subscribers hungry for the new service waiting in excess of 60 and even up to 90 minutes to enquire about connecting.

This sensational demand in advance of Foxtel and Optus visions Services going live although initially a dream outcome for Australis’ owners, contributed to its downfall.

Potential Subscribers waiting for their antenna and decoder boxes also overwhelmed the National Call Centre frustrated at delays in installation. Installers at the time were also overwhelmed and in some cases, either faulty decoder boxes or misaligned line of sight Antenna's, caused outages and frustrated subscribers wanting a repair, but Galaxy had limited Installers who were busy installing new Decoders and this caused repair and installation times to blow out.

With waiting lists for the much anticipated Digital Decider boxes pressure built on the manufacturer for supply to a growing list of both registered new potential subscribers and VIP's (who were given preference).

From the outset, the rollout of Digital Satellite Deciders ran into trouble with consumer set top box outages. Technicians on site where known by service reports to have re-installed a second decoder and even cases of a third decoder due to unreliable set top Satellite Decoder boxes. It was becoming increasingly evident that the Digital Decider boxes many had been waiting for, experienced quality control problems from the manufacturer.

Furthermore, increased competition from Foxtel and Optus Vision forced Galaxy to lower prices further or lose customers.

The financial crisis at Australis meant that much of Galaxy's life seemed to be spent trying to save the company from receivership. In October 1995, a merger was proposed by Australis and its biggest rival, Foxtel. The proposal was rejected by the Australian Competition & Consumer Commission (ACCC), citing fears that a merger between the two businesses would stifle competition. Another Australis-Foxtel merger was proposed in July 1997 but was also vetoed for similar reasons. Another proposal made in August 1996, under which Australis and Optus would share satellite infrastructure (while still trading separately) was approved by the ACCC but later blocked by the Federal Court of Australia.

With hopes of a merger dashed and serious cashflow problems continuing to plague the company, Australis relied on "rescue packages" of capital injections from a number of new investors (including Kerry Packer's PBL, among others) to stay afloat.

On 18 May 1998, the Supreme Court of New South Wales declared that Australis was insolvent and the company went into liquidation. It has been estimated that losses totalled A$800 million. Of those who purchased assets after the company's collapse, the biggest beneficiary was likely their biggest competitor Foxtel, who were able to purchase Galaxy's 65,000 remaining subscribers as well as terminate their crippling programming deal and renegotiate directly with the studios.

There has been considerable controversy over the role Foxtel may have played in Galaxy's demise: in 2003, it was the target of legal action by Australis bondholders, who sued Foxtel's parent company News Corporation for the $6 billion which they alleged Australis would have earned had it not lost the rights to the programming content.

== Legacy ==
After Australis's insolvency, its eight channels continued to run on the Foxtel platform, and five of them are present in some form on all the major pay television providers in Australia. Two of Galaxy's general entertainment channels, TV1 and Arena, are part of the basic entertainment package on Foxtel (although TV1 closed down on 31 December 2013), Galaxy's sport service became Fox Sports, Galaxy's music channel Red was renamed Channel V in 1997, and Galaxy's two movie channels ran as Showtime Australia until 2012, when it merged with the Movie Network Channels to become Foxtel Movies.

GalaxyTV was a revolutionary concept for Australian consumers at the time.

Microwave Transmission was emitted in each capital city (except Darwin) using line of sight and from the highest point available in those cities.

Microwave antennas from the Galaxy era can still be seen installed on some homes in capital cities to this day, however the technology was abandoned due to the advent of cable television.

AT&T's Paula Walzdorf was headhunted for the challenging roll of National Call Centre General Manager.

The introduction of digital decoders for satellite transmission exposed staff to new customer service methods still in use today.

Call Routing Technology was introduced into Australia for the first time and used for outbound service calls at Galaxy. The Save Our Subscribers (SOS) team utilised this new technology to auto dial numbers and drop calls into waiting operators, with database records appearing within seconds.

Customer retention methods involved identifying customer cancellation reasons and offering targeted benefits to subscribers free of charge or complimentary for a period of time, with personalised follow-ups from the SOS team.

== See also ==
- Subscription television in Australia
