= Digital television in Australia =

Digital television is a technology which is available via a number of types of services and providers in Australia. They mostly broadcast in high-definition television, which has become the de facto national standard.

== History ==
Between 2001 and 2009, the number of homes with digital television rose from around 10,000 to an estimated 4,000,000.

The first digital channels provided by the national broadcaster, the Australian Broadcasting Corporation were the multi-channels, ABC Kids and Fly TV, between 2001 and 2003. The first enduring digital channel was launched in March 2005, named ABC2 (now ABC Family). Now, all five broadcasters, such as ABC, SBS, 10, Seven and Nine, are transmitting their 24/7 program services in different capital cities in Australia, including Sydney, Melbourne, Brisbane, Adelaide, Perth, Hobart, Canberra and Darwin.

== Types of providers ==
- Australian digital terrestrial television, branded as Freeview, is provided by a number of free-to-air channels in Australia, including that provided by the national broadcaster, on ABC Television.
- VAST, a free-to-view satellite television service that provides a service to remote areas, which replaced Optus Aurora.
- Foxtel, a commercial subscription satellite and cable television service.
- Optus Television, a subscription cable television service.
- TransTV, from TransACT, a subscription cable television service.

== Historical Services ==
- Austar, a subscription satellite television service.
- Optus Aurora, a free-to-view satellite service, which ceased transmission in December 2013.
- UBI World TV was a subscription satellite television service offering predominantly ethnic channels between 2004 and June 2012. The company filed for bankruptcy and ceased trading in June 2012.

== See also ==
- Digital television transition
- High-definition television in Australia
- Internet television in Australia
- List of digital television channels in Australia
- Subscription television in Australia
