= Showtime Greats =

- Country: Australia
- Network: Showtime

Programming
- Language: English
- Picture format: 576i (SDTV)

Ownership
- Owner: Showtime Movie Channels
- Sister channels: Showtime Movie Channels

History
- Launched: 3 March 1995
- Closed: 14 November 2009
- Replaced by: showtime action showtime comedy showtime drama
- Former names: Encore (prior to 1 March 2004)

Showtime Greats (previously Encore) was an Australian cable and satellite television channel which was available on the Foxtel, Austar and Optus Television subscription television platforms.

Showtime Greats broadcast films dating from the 1960s to the early 2000s. These films were older films which had previously premiered on sister channel Showtime premiere. Prior to March 2004, the channel was known as Encore and aired much older films.

The channel was closed on 15 November 2009 and was replaced by three themed channels.

== See also ==
- Showtime movie channels
- Showcase
