= Subscription television in Australia =

Subscription television in Australia is provided using technologies such as cable television, satellite television and internet television by a number of companies unified in their provision of a subscription television service. Notable actors in the sector include Foxtel, Netflix, Stan, Amazon Prime Video and Disney+. Regulation of the sector is assured by the Australian Communications and Media Authority.

In 2012, prior to market entry of some major digital streaming services to Australia, only about 28% of Australian homes had a pay TV subscription, which was one of the lowest subscriber rates in the developed world. By 2019, the situation had evolved so that almost 14 million Australians had access to a paid television or video on demand service.

== History ==
=== 1990s ===
Galaxy was the first provider of subscription television in Australia, launching a MMDS service on 26 January 1995. Originally Premier Sports Network was the only local channel to be fully operational, with Showtime and Encore launching in March. They were later joined in April by TV1, Arena, Max, Red and Quest. A satellite service was launched later in the year.

Optus Vision and Austar launched their cable services on 19 September followed by Foxtel on 22 October.

Northgate Communications launched their service on 13 March 1997. It was later acquired by Neighbourhood Cable.

Galaxy was closed on 20 May 1998. Two weeks later Foxtel significantly boosted its customer base by acquiring Galaxy subscribers from the liquidator of Australis Media and immediately commenced supplying programming to Galaxy's subscribers on an interim basis. In February 1999 Foxtel began offering its own satellite service to new customers.

Following the collapse, ECTV quickly signed a deal with Optus Vision. Less than two months later, it was acquired by Austar, along with its stake in XYZ. Austar replaced the ECTV packages with their own in September.

=== 2000s ===
TransTV launched in 2001, beginning with VoD followed later by linear channels.

UBI World TV launched in 2004. Also in 2004, TV PLUS launched its Ethnic platforms catering for Balkans, Russians and other Eastern European communities. Foxtel and Austar both launched their digital offerings in 2004, with a total of 130 channels. The following year, Foxtel introduces their Foxtel iQ personal video recorder.

SelecTV launched on 12 April 2006. It ceased its English programming in late 2010.

Neighbourhood Cable with its hybrid fibre coaxial (HFC) cable networks in three Victorian regional cities of Mildura, Ballarat and Geelong was acquired by TransACT at the end of 2007. In November 2011, TransACT was acquired by iiNet Limited, which in 2015 itself became a subsidiary of TPG.

Foxtel commenced their HD service in February 2009.

=== 2010s ===
Fetch TV entered the market in 2010 with a subscription service over a few ADSL2+ networks.

UBI World TV filed for bankruptcy and ceased trading in June 2012.

== Channels available ==
Almost all channels which currently or previously operated in Australia were available through Foxtel and Austar, being the dominant player in the market. However, some smaller competitors offer a subset of channels which are exclusive or unavailable on Foxtel services.

== Delivery ==
=== Satellite ===
Satellite television is a service that delivers television programming to viewers by relaying it from a communications satellite orbiting the Earth directly to the viewer's location. The signals are received via an outdoor parabolic antenna commonly referred to as a satellite dish and a low-noise block downconverter. In Australia, paid satellite television is or has been provided through the following satellites:

- Foxtel uses the Optus C1 and Optus D3 satellites.
- The various Globecast platform services use PAS 8.
- MySAT uses PAS 8.
- The various PanGlobal TV platform services use PAS 8.
- TFCDirect! uses PAS 8.
- Canal+ Australie uses Intelsat 701.
- Pacific Media uses AsiaSat 4.

=== HFC cable ===
Hybrid fibre-coaxial (HFC) is a broadband network that combines optical fibre and coaxial cable. It has been commonly employed globally by cable television operators since the early 1990s. In Australia it is used or has been used by:

- Foxtel use Telstra's cable in Sydney, Melbourne, Brisbane, Adelaide and Perth.
- Optus use their own cable network in Sydney, Melbourne and Brisbane to provide subscription television. However, the service has reportedly become unavailable in areas where the National Broadband Network is rolled out.
- Neighbourhood Cable (merged with TransACT) provides a TV service over their own cable to Geelong, Ballarat and Mildura.

The majority of these cable networks has since been removed from service, with many parts of the Telstra HFC network (used by Foxtel) integrated into the National Broadband Network – the Optus network was planned to be similarly integrated, but it was later determined to not be financially viable due to the network being in a state of disrepair.

As Optus' subscription TV platform eventually focused selling Foxtel's service over their own cable network, they (essentially) discontinued their service in preparation for handing over their cable. Customers were encouraged to contact and subscribe to Foxtel to continue receiving those services – Foxtel, in turn, migrated all cable customers (both their own and new customers previously with Optus) to their satellite service.

Optus remains in the subscription television market through the relaunched Optus Sport platform and retailing Fetch TV, both of which are internet-based services (although Optus Sport is available as part of Tabcorp's SKY satellite-based offering to pubs and clubs or, at an extra monthly cost, via satellite to consumers, with both requiring special decoders).

Excluding internet-based services, Foxtel is the sole remaining "traditional" mainstream pay TV operator in Australia; Foxtel's satellite service is also the last remaining offering in the field, having acquired Austar in 2012 and Optus having withdrawn their cable offering due to the transfer of the network infrastructure.

Foxtel have continuously been trying to integrate broadband internet into their service, both by selling broadband plans (via the NBN) and by using the internet to expand their television service. Several popular streaming apps, such as catch-up TV and Netflix are supported on their iQ4 decoder, which also supports "Start Over" functionality (via a simultaneous internet stream of most channels).

Foxtel's upcoming iQ5 (and possibly the existing iQ4) set-top-boxes are also intending to support an "internet-only" mode which doesn't require a satellite signal to operate. As they have begun offering similar streaming boxes, separate to their traditional decoders, it is likely that Foxtel may consider discontinuing the satellite service if the internet is able to support a similar level of service to the satellite one. Given the issues in regional Australia when it comes to broadband access, this may take several years to become feasible.

=== IPTV / Internet television ===
Internet television in Australia is the digital distribution of movies and television content via the Internet. In Australia, paid internet television is provided by a number of generalist streaming service providers, in addition to several niche providers that focus on specific genres. Major providers of streaming services in Australia include:

- Netflix
- Amazon Prime Video
- Paramount+
- Stan
- Disney+
- HBO Max
- Foxtel Now
- Binge
- Kayo Sports
- Apple TV+
- Brollie

Internet television in Australia is also provided by IPTV:

- FetchTV provides IPTV through the Telstra, dodo, iiNet, Internode, Aussie Broadband, iPrimus and Westnet Internet networks, or any other internet provider when their set top box is purchased from one of their retail partners.
- TransACT's TransTV service (merged with Neighbourhood Cable) uses VDSL over a fibre-to-the-kerb network in some suburbs of the A.C.T.
- Foxtel uses the Internet to provide some extra content to its iQ2 platform. It also offers Foxtel on Xbox, a subset of Foxtel channels via any internet provider

=== Defunct services ===
A number of subscription television services in Australia have become defunct or are no longer supported in Australia:

- Austar previously delivered an analogue MMDS service into selected regional areas, however the system was dumped in the late 1990s/early 2000s. Austar also briefly tested a digital MMDS service on the Gold Coast.
- TARBS leased some of Austar's metropolitan licenses for their service.
- ECTV and Galaxy also used MMDS.
- SelecTV used Intelsat 8 until administrators shut the service down in January 2011.
- UBI World TV used Optus D2 and Intelsat 8 until United Broadcasting International Pty Ltd ceased to trade on 8 June 2012.
- Austar has ceased transmission 24 May 2012, prior to this, Foxtel had acquired Austar.

== See also ==
- Australian Subscription Television and Radio Association (ASTRA)
- Internet television in Australia
