= High-definition television in Australia =

High-definition television in Australia is available via cable, IPTV, satellite and terrestrial television. The first high-definition broadcasts began in 2001 and since then the number of channels available to view has grown to a maximum of 27 that can be viewed on pay-TV service, Foxtel.

== Broadcasters ==
=== ABC ===
On 1 January 2002, the ABC began a prime-time simulcast of ABC's Sydney station ABN, except that it had no watermark and was upconverted from standard definition to 1080i high definition. On 1 January 2005 it changed to 576p to accommodate the launch of new channel ABC Family (then ABC2, ABC Comedy and ABC TV Plus) and gradually expanded its operating hours.

On 1 January 2008, the ABC's high definition simulcast was rebranded as ABC HD, relaunching as a high definition multichannel with its own logo and branding. The channel was also enhanced to 720p to mark the start of native high-definition content.

Throughout its multichannel era, ABC HD continued providing a high definition simulcast of ABN Sydney. As a result, viewers outside of New South Wales would see Sydney-based news bulletins and other localised content. The purpose of this as of 2008, was to provide high-definition versions of ABC1 shows when available (Prior to this, the broadcaster relied on regulation exemptions that allowed it to meet a high-definition quota using content upscaled from standard definition).

There were exceptions to the ABC TV simulcast: During the 2008 Summer Paralympics in Beijing, ABC HD became a dedicated sports broadcaster, simulcasting the dedicated coverage on ABC2 for most of the day. The 2009 VFL Grand Final was shown exclusively live on ABC HD. For a time up until ABC HD branding ceased, ABC HD screened a "7:30 Select" national highlights package instead of the Sydney version of Stateline.

On 10 June 2010, ABC HD's unique branding was replaced with that of ABC TV, reverting the channel to an ABN Sydney simulcast. ABC HD ceased being a simulcast of ABC TV from 6 July 2010 in Tasmania and the ACT; 7 July 2010 in Queensland, South Australia, Western Australia and Northern Territory; and on 8 July 2010 in Victoria and New South Wales, all replaced by a looped pre-launch promotion for ABC News 24 (now ABC News) on channel 24. This made ABC the second broadcaster in Australia to permanently discontinue the high definition simulcast of its main channel, following the removal of 10 HD to create 10's former sports and now entertainment channel 10 Drama in 2009.

ABC Director of Television Richard Finlayson confirmed that the ABC would recommence simulcasting in HD in June 2016. However, the launch date was later pushed back to an indefinite time in late 2016 due to technical reasons, with the launch date finally announced as 6 December 2016. However, in contrast to its past, ABC HD provided region-specific simulcasting, not just a nationwide simulcast of ABN Sydney. Additionally, the channel broadcast in MPEG-4 format as opposed to the traditional MPEG-2 format. As a result of the channel's revival, the ABC News channel was reduced to a standard definition broadcast.

On 6 December 2016, ABC HD recommenced simulcasting in high definition, upgraded to 1080i high-definition format via Freeview and Optus D1. As a result, ABC News 24 (now ABC News) was reduced to a standard-definition broadcast on channel 24.

From June 2025, ABC will resume broadcasting ABC NEWS Channel in high-definition. ABC Entertains will also broadcast in high-definition. Both ABC NEWS Channel and ABC Entertains will no longer be available in standard-definition via Freeview.

=== Seven Network ===
In 2004, after the 2001 introduction of digital terrestrial television in Australia, the Seven Network began a part-time high definition simulcast on digital channel 70 under the name 7 HD Digital. This simulcast showcased native high definition content alongside standard-definition services on Seven. During the times that native high definition content was unavailable for simulcasting, a promo loop that showcased extracts from a variety of Seven's programs was broadcast.

7HD was officially announced on 15 September 2007, with the Seven West Media announcing their intention to start a high definition multichannel, that was initially expected to launch in December 2007. However, 7HD became the first Free-to-air commercial television channel introduced to metropolitan areas since 1988, when it launched prior on 15 October 2007, with 25th Hour being the first program broadcast at 10:30pm.

The channel replaced Seven's existing high definition service 7 HD Digital, a part-time simulcast of its standard-definition and analogue services. Due to an amendment of the Broadcasting Services Act 1992 in 2006, the Broadcasting Legislation Amendment (Digital television) Act 2006, television networks are now permitted to launch digital multichannels, provided that they are broadcast exclusively in high definition. The channel expanded its broadcast schedule on 10 December 2007 to include daytime programming which had previously been a full simulcast of the main channel. 7HD breakaway programming ceased transmission on Sunday 4 October 2009 in preparation for the launch of 7two a few weeks later on 1 November. 7HD then returned to being a full high definition simulcast of Seven, before finally being replaced by 7mate on 25 September 2010.

On 10 May 2016, 7HD returned as a high definition simulcast on channel 70. However, Melbourne and Adelaide were the only cities that received 7HD as a simulcast of Seven's primary channel on that date; Sydney, Brisbane and Perth received 7HD as a simulcast of 7mate. This is so that upcoming AFL matches can be shown in HD in all markets.

In order to allow the 2016 Summer Olympics to be broadcast in high definition in all capital cities, 7HD was temporarily changed to a simulcast of Seven's primary channel in Sydney, Brisbane and Perth on 5 August 2016. However, it was reverted to a 7mate simulcast in those markets on 22 August 2016, following the conclusion of the Olympics.

On 16 December 2016, 7HD switched from simulcasting 7mate to simulcasting Seven's primary channel in Sydney, Brisbane and Perth to allow the 2017 Australian Open tennis to be simulcast in high definition in all metropolitan markets. This change was not reverted and 7HD remained a simulcast of Seven in all capital cities. However, in order to broadcast AFL matches featured on 7mate in HD, Seven would use breakaway programming to show AFL matches in HD while keeping 7HD as a simulcast of Seven. On 16 January 2020, Seven viewers in metropolitan areas and regional Queensland were given access to 7mate in HD replacing 7food network, a food channel on channel 74. Following the relaunch of 7mate HD on Channel 74, 7HD continued broadcasting as a HD simulcast of the main Seven channel in all metropolitan markets.

7Bravo was launched on 15 January 2023, as a HD channel.

=== Nine Network ===
From the launch of digital TV on 1 January 2001, the Nine Network's high definition service, a simulcast of its standard-definition and analogue services, was heavily simulcasting Nine's standard-definition content upconverted to HD. From 2002, this was interspersed with a loop of high definition demonstration material during business hours, for viewing in the showrooms of television retailers, at the conclusion of an equivalent service by Network Ten.

2002 saw the first revenue-generating broadcast in native HD in Australia, with the drama Judging Amy. Nine increased its native HD output in the lead-up to the commencement of the HD quota on 1 July 2003, from which point it broadcast a minimum of 1,040 hours of native HD content per year. The largest portion of this was The Today Show.

9HD was officially announced as a part-time (or "breakaway") multichannel on 27 September 2007, to replace the Nine Network's existing high definition simulcast service through the use of an amendment to the Broadcasting Services Act 1992 in 2006. The Broadcasting Legislation Amendment (Digital television) Act 2006 permitted television networks to launch digital multichannels, provided that they are broadcast exclusively in high definition.

Although originally expected to be the first free-to-air commercial television channel introduced to metropolitan areas since 1988, the surprise launch of rival Seven HD, on 15 October 2007, one month before transmissions were scheduled to begin, meant that 9HD was not the first high definition multichannel in Australia. Following this, plans for a November launch in 2007 were postponed until 2008. On 10 March 2008, PBL Media announced that it would launch the channel on 17 March 2008 at 10:30pm, with its first program, Nightline.

The re-branded 9HD officially commenced transmission on 17 March 2008 from PBL Media's four metropolitan owned-and-operated stations, TCN Sydney, GTV Melbourne, QTQ Brisbane and NTD Darwin, in addition to WIN Corporation's two metropolitan stations NWS Adelaide, and STW Perth as well as on its regional stations RTQ Queensland, WIN Southern New South Wales and the ACT, VTV Victoria, and TVT Tasmania. The first official program on launch night began at 19:00, Nine News's flagship daily main national nightly television news bulletin program Nine Television News.

All 9HD breakaway programming ceased transmission on Sunday 2 August 2009 in preparation for the launch of GO! (now 9Go!) on 9 August. As a result, 9HD became a full simulcast of Nine's main channel.

9HD was replaced by the 9Gem multichannel on 26 September 2010, which unlike the previous incarnation, was a full-time breakaway and branded separately (with one exception being the London Olympics). This removed the HD simulcast of Channel Nine entirely to allow a third channel to fit on Nine's DVB-T multiplex (due to technical and regulatory limitations). As a result, Nine lost all youth, news and comedy content in HD, but instead screened female, crime and lifestyle content on its only HD facility.

For the purposes of some sport such as cricket, 9Gem was still used on an occasional basis to broadcast HD under the Wide World of Sports brand, though not necessarily as a simulcast with Nine. As such, this was generally limited to events outside of prime time, while those with more prominence continued to be shown on the Nine Network.

On 26 November 2015, Nine recommenced simulcasting in HD on channel 90. As a result, 9Gem was moved to channel 92 and reduced to standard definition. Then in June 2019, metro viewers were given access to 9Gem in HD on Channel 95, replacing the Your Money channel.

This revival marked 9HD's switch to H.264/MPEG-4 AVC broadcasting, allowing the broadcaster to operate at full quality in 1920x1080i50 resolution using a lower bitrate than in 2007. This gives the network the ability to provide all the other multichannel services launched since 2009, such as 9Go!, at the same time.

On 8th May 2024, 9Go! HD replaced 9Go! as a HD channel on 99.

=== Network 10 ===
From the revamp of its production and circle logo and of the slogan Seriously Ten on 1 February 2001, this was interspersed with a loop of high definition demonstration material during business hours, for viewing in the showrooms of television retailers, at the conclusion of an equivalent service by Network Ten.

Ten HD (now 10 HD) was officially announced on 14 September 2007, to replace Network Ten's existing high definition service, a simulcast of its standard-definition and analogue services, through the use of an amendment to the Broadcasting Services Act 1992 in 2006. The Broadcasting Legislation Amendment (Digital Television) Act 2006 permitted television networks to launch digital multichannels, provided that they are broadcast exclusively in high definition.

Although originally expected to be the first free-to-air commercial television channel introduced to metropolitan areas since 1988, the surprise launch of Seven Media Group's HD offering, 7HD, on 15 October 2007, two months before transmissions were scheduled to begin, meant that Ten HD was launched as the second high-definition multichannel in Australia. PBL Media announced the creation of a similar multichannel, 9HD, on 27 September, which was launched on 17 March 2008.

Ten's parent company, and shareholder in metropolitan ratings system OzTAM, Ten Network Holdings Limited, began discussions with the ratings system operator to have digital multichannels, such as 10 HD (then Ten HD) and ABC Family (then ABC2, ABC Comedy and ABC TV Plus), included in television ratings for the first time on 17 September 2007. As well as this, on the same day, it was announced that the national weekend editions of Ten News would be timeshifted from Ten onto Ten HD, an hour delayed at 6 pm, to directly compete with Seven News and National Nine News. This would have seen Ten News formally broadcast at 6 pm for the first time since 1992, however, the timeslot was later amended to 5.30 pm.

In preparation for the launch of Ten HD, Ten's digital terrestrial channel line-up was updated on 19 November 2007, with changes consisting of LCN1 redirecting to Network Ten's then-current high-definition simulcast. Following this, on 21 November 2007, Ten Network Holdings Limited announced that it would launch the channel on 16 December 2007 at 5.00 pm, with the first program, Totally Wild.

Ten HD officially commenced transmission on 16 December 2007 from the network's five metropolitan owned-and-operated stations in Sydney, Melbourne, Brisbane, Adelaide, and Perth. Prior to the official launch, at 5.00 pm the first program, Totally Wild, was broadcast. Following this, for the first time since 1992, Ten News and Sports Tonight were broadcast in direct competition with Seven News and National Nine News, timeshifted by thirty minutes to 5.30 pm and 6.00 pm respectively.

The first official program on launch night began at 8.30 pm, the 2001 movie Black Hawk Down. This was followed by Bon Jovi's Lost Highway Tour at 11.30 pm and Video Hits Presents: The Music of Supernatural at 12.25 am. Video Hits Up-Late marked the end of the first night of transmission for Ten HD at 12.50 am.

In the lead-up to the opening night, the channel promised up to eleven hours of time-shifted programming from Ten in addition to fifty hours of exclusive programming, which included live sport, entertainment, films, documentaries, science fiction and news. This consisted of six movies per week, in addition to National Geographic documentaries in the afternoon, from 3pm to 5pm, music-oriented programming following the Sunday Night Movie, along with a primetime breakaway schedule on Thursdays and from 10.30 pm to 11.30 pm Monday to Wednesday.

In addition to high definition broadcasting on channel 1, a standard-definition simulcast of Ten HD (now 10 HD) was provided on channel 11 as Ten SD2.

From 2009, commercial networks in Australia were allowed to broadcast a standard-definition subchannel. Rather than introduce a new digital service, Ten decided to relaunch Ten HD as a sports-only channel, to be named One HD (now 10 Drama), and use its standard-definition simulcast on channel 11 to broadcast a standard-definition simulcast called One SD. Before One HD's official launch, most breakaway programming shown on Ten HD ceased from 1 January 2009, and only showed a high-definition broadcast of the existing Ten digital service, along with a few sports-based breakaway programs. Ten HD officially shut down on 25 March 2009, with One HD launching the following day.

After the Nine Network restarted broadcasting 9HD in November 2015, Ten confirmed that it was working on rebroadcasting Ten HD. However, they did not put a time frame on it, stating that they are "working through some technical and rights issues". On 11 February 2016, some smart TVs began receiving notification messages advising of Ten HD through a "ghost broadcast" that soon disappeared.

10 later recommenced simulcasting in high definition on 2 March 2016 on channel 13 from 3pm, in time for the 2016 season of the Virgin Australia Supercars Championship. As a result, One (now 10 Drama) was reduced to a standard-definition broadcast on both channel 1 and channel 12. 10 uses MPEG-4 technology to broadcast 10 HD.

On 16 September 2020, 10 HD moved from channel 13 back to channel 1 and to a new channel 15 to fit Network 10's 3rd multichannel 10 Shake (now Nickelodeon), which is currently on 10 HD's former location, Channel 13. On 27 September 2021, 10 Drama (then 10 Bold and 10 Bold Drama) on channel 12 converted to 1080i HD with no simulcast in SD.

=== SBS ===
The SBS HD multichannel was launched on 14 December 2006, on LCN 30. It broadcasts identical programming to SBS, but in 1080i HD via Freeview and Optus D1. On 8 April 2017, SBS Viceland was given HD access on LCN 31 and SBS HD was converted into MPEG-4. On 1 July 2019, Channel 32 was converted into SBS World Movies in 1080i HD. On 5 December 2023 NITV channel 34 was converted to HD. An SD simultaneous broadcast of NITV was also launched on the same day on channel 36.

== Platforms ==
=== Terrestrial ===
==== Freeview ====
The Freeview brand was launched in November 2008 with teaser commercials promising 15 channels in 2009. The first new "Freeview" channel started on 26 March 2009 with Network Ten's One HD sports channel, now called 10 Bold. Further advertising began on 26 April 2009, with the first Freeview certified devices appearing in retailers from May 2009. In June 2010, the second phase of devices, marked as "Freeview EPG" devices, became available in retail stores, designed to work with the newly launched interactive EPG built on MHEG-5. This Freeview EPG ceased operating on 24 November 2017.

=== Satellite & Cable ===
==== Foxtel ====
Foxtel has been carrying HD channels since 2008. As of 2026 it has over 50 HD channels, a mix of basic and premium subscription, free-to-air and free-to-view services.

HD broadcasts are received using the Foxtel IQ5 service or a Foxtel HD+ receiver. A selection of HD push-video on demand content is also available through Foxtel Anytime on Foxtel HD+ receivers.

==== Free-to-air ====
ABC HD, SBS HD, SBS2 HD, SBS World Movies, NITV, 7HD (70), 7 (7, 71), 7two, 7mate, 7Bravo, 9HD, 9Go!, 9Gem, 10 HD, 10 Drama along with regional networks WIN HD, 9HD with NBN and 7HD and 10 HD with Seven Media Group are available unencrypted and without subscription on digital satellite, and may be received by anybody with suitable equipment – a high-definition satellite receiver and a satellite dish.

== See also ==
- Digital television in Australia
- Internet television in Australia
- Subscription television in Australia
