= Showtime Movie Channels =

showtime premiere
- Country: Australia

Programming
- Language: English
- Picture format: 576i (SDTV); 1080i (HDTV)
- Timeshift service: showtime two

Ownership
- Owner: the Premium Movie Partnership (PMP)/Foxtel
- Sister channels: Showcase; Showtime Action; Showtime Comedy; Showtime Drama; Showtime Greats

History
- Launched: 3 March 1995
- Closed: 1 June 2016
- Replaced by: Foxtel Movies
- Former names: Showtime (prior to 15 November 2009)

Showtime Movie Channels was a group of Australian pay television movie channels, available on the Foxtel, Optus and Austar TV platforms. The service consisted of five original channels (showtime premiere, showcase, showtime action, showtime comedy, showtime drama), three HD simulcasts (showtime premiere HD, showcase HD, showtime action HD) and two timeshift channels (showtime two, showcase two). It was owned and operated by the Premium Movie Partnership (PMP), a joint venture in which Sony Pictures Entertainment, NBCUniversal, Viacom, News Corporation and Liberty Global had equal shares. Foxtel took over managing and producing the Showtime channels as of 31 October 2012, with it purchasing assets of the PMP. On 9 December 2012, it was announced that Movie Network and Showtime (with the exception of Showcase) would be replaced with a new line-up of Foxtel branded movie channels to be named Foxtel Movies

The main competitor to Showtime was Movie Network.

== History ==
Formed in late 1994 through a joint partnership between Australis Media, Columbia TriStar, MCA, Viacom and Tele-Communications Inc., Showtime started broadcasting in 1995 as part of the basic package on the now-defunct Galaxy service, showing first-run films. At the same time its sister channel named Encore was launched, showing older 'classic' movies. Until their launch in March 1995, trailers and previews were broadcast in their channel slots. Both channels were originally programmed in Burbank, California, until local operations commenced in October 1995. It later became available as part of the Austar and Foxtel services when they were launched. In December 2002, the Showtime channels also became available on Optus Television. Encore was renamed Showtime Greats on 1 March 2004, with a move to more contemporary films.

In September 2007 it was announced that a premium channel called showcase would be launched on 1 December 2007 as part of the suite of Showtime channels, ahead of changes that would allow Movie Network to compete directly with Showtime for subscribers.

showcase screens movies (mainly independent, arthouse and documentary features), some comedy programs as well as a number of television series.

On 15 November 2009, Showtime Greats was replaced by showtime action, showtime comedy and showtime drama. In addition, Showtime was renamed showtime premiere.

On 11 October 2012, Foxtel announced they would acquire certain assets of the Premium Movie Partnership, which would result in Foxtel managing and producing the Showtime channels as of 31 October 2012.

== Channels ==
All showtime channels area available on Foxtel, Austar and Optus, unless otherwise noted. showtime premiere and showcase are also available through Xbox 360's IPTV service.

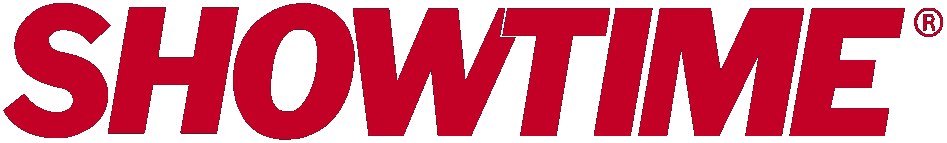
Showtime logo prior till 14 November 2009 rename as premiere

Channel	SD Service	Timeshift	HD service Not available on Optus	Notes
Showtime Premiere	Launched 3 March 1995	Launched 2 December 2000 as Showtime 2	Launched 15 November 2009	Branded as Showtime until 14 November 2009
Showtime Premiere	Channel 401	Channel 402	Channel 219	Branded as Showtime until 14 November 2009
Showtime Action	Launched 15 November 2009	Launched 6 February 2010 (custom and officially fanmade for a showtime action time shift)		
Showtime Action	Channel 406		Channel 221	
Showtime Comedy	Launched 15 November 2009			
Showtime Comedy	Channel 407			
Showtime Drama	Launched 15 November 2009			
Showtime Drama	Channel 408			
Showtime Greats	Launched 3 March 1995			Branded as Encore until 1 March 2004; Closed on 14 November 2009
Showtime Greats	Channel 404			Branded as Encore until 1 March 2004; Closed on 14 November 2009

== Internet download services ==
Launched on 1 October 2009 were two exclusive channels to Foxtel Download. These were:

- Showtime Family – featured family friendly movies and was exclusive to Foxtel's download service.
- Showtime Horror – featured Classic and modern horror movies and was exclusive to Foxtel's download service.

== Showtime Australia ==
Showtime Australia is unrelated to the American Showtime service, but pays a licence fee for the use of the name and trademark. It also produces some Australian movies, such as Bad Eggs, in conjunction with other companies.

== Trademark and branding ==
Despite the name being Showtime, for branding purposes it is usually spelt in all capitals to match the channel logo. Similarly, Showcase is usually spelt in all lower case. As a matter of fact, the branding for Showtime uses the former logo from the American cable service until 1997.

== See also ==
- Hallmark Channel
