= Showcase (Australian TV channel) =

Australian pay-TV channel

- Country: Australia

Programming
- Language: English
- Picture format: 576i (SDTV); 1080i (HDTV)
- Timeshift service: Showcase +2

Ownership
- Owner: Foxtel
- Sister channels: Foxtel Networks channels

History
- Launched: 1 December 2007
- Replaced: FX
- Former names: FOX Showcase (2018-23)

Availability

Streaming media
- Foxtel Go: Channel 112
- Binge: binge.com.au

Showcase (formerly Fox Showcase) is an Australian premium drama cable and satellite television channel. It was initially part of the Showtime Australia channels and was managed by PMP chief executive officer Peter Rose. In 2007 Rose said Showcase "provides a real home at last for quality drama in Australia, and this list of outstanding event television is just the start". Showcase launched with the Australian TV premieres of Dexter and Australian-made series Satisfaction.

Showcase is owned and operated by Foxtel Networks, and is their flagship entertainment channel, and airs programming with no ad breaks during shows.

The showcase can be found on channel 112 on Foxtel and Optus TV.

Foxtel took over managing and producing Showcase and the other Showtime channels as of 31 October 2012, with it purchasing assets of the PMP. On 9 December 2012, it was announced that Movie Network and Showtime (except Showcase) would be replaced with a new lineup of Foxtel-branded movie channels to be named Foxtel Movies Showcase would continue to be the home of premium dramas from HBO and other international networks, original programming, documentaries, and independent films until 2025 when Warner Bros announced that it would launch HBO Max in Australia which would be the new home of HBO from March 31, potentially delivering a huge blow to Showcase.

On 3 November 2014, Showcase moved from Foxtel's Premium Movies and Drama package to the newly founded Drama package. In addition, the channel moved from channel 404 to channel 115 and Showcase + 2 moved from channel 414 to channel 158.

Following the closure of SoHo and the launch of the channel Binge on 5 October 2016, Showcase moved to channel 114.

On 28 September 2023, after Real Life launched, the channel rebranded to its former name Showcase with a new logo.

== Background ==
Showcase launched with the Australian premiere of Satisfaction, based around high-class Australian escorts and their clients. The show ran for three seasons.

Showcase also aired all three series of Love My Way, a series which moved from FOX8 to W to Showtime each season yet was re-run on Showcase all together for the first time in 2007–2008.

In 2008, Foxtel and Showcase announced a new Australian drama called Tangle. Tangle is from the makers of Love My Way, and features an all-star Australian cast of Matt Day, Kat Stewart, Justine Clarke, Ben Mendelsohn and Catherine McClements. The series debuted on 1 October 2009 to rave reviews: "Tangle puts Free to Air Television to shame. Australian drama desperately needs more voices that emanate from truth".

In 2010 Showtime commissioned a 6-hour mini-series Cloudstreet based on the novel by Tim Winton. The series premiered on 22 May 2011. The stellar cast includes Essie Davis as Dolly Pickles, Stephen Curry as Sam Pickles, Emma Booth as Rose Pickles, Kerry Fox as Oriel Lamb, Geoff Morrell as Lester Lamb, and with Todd Lasance as Quick Lamb and NIDA graduate Hugo Johnstone-Burt as Fish Lamb.

== Logo history ==
Original logo

Logo used 26 September 2018 - 10 October 2019

Logo used 10 October 2019 - 28 September 2023

== Original programming ==
- Love My Way (2007) - previously aired on FOX8 (2004–05) and W Channel (2006)
- Satisfaction (2007–10)
- Tangle (2009–12)
- Cloudstreet (2011)
- Devil's Playground (2014)
- Deadline Gallipoli (2015)
- Secret City (2016–19) - co-production with Netflix
- The Kettering Incident (2016)
- A Place to Call Home (2016–18) - previously aired on Seven (2013–14) and SoHo (2015)
- Wentworth (2017–21) - previously aired on SoHo (2013–16)
- Picnic at Hanging Rock (2018)
- Mr Inbetween (2018–21) - co-production with FX
- Fighting Season (2018)
- Lambs of God (2019)
- Upright (2019–22) - co-production with Sky Atlantic (season 1) and Sky Comedy (season 2)
- The End (2020) - co-production with Sky Atlantic
- The Twelve (2022–present)
- High Country (2024–present)

== Overseas programming ==
Many of the programs featured on FOX Showcase are Australian premieres, and feature on cable networks in America which feature adult themes and mature issues such as HBO, Showtime and FX in the United States. As of 2025, many of these shows from these mentioned cable networks have each relocated to their respective parent company's streaming services in Australia with FX now on Disney+, Showtime on Paramount+ and HBO now moving to HBO Max.

At Foxtel's 2013 programming highlights presentation on 26 February 2013, Foxtel announced an agreement with HBO that was to see HBO content be exclusively shown on Showcase, with it not to screen on free to air television for at least five years.

=== Current programming ===
- Apples Never Fall
- Based On A True Story
- The Big C
- The Brokenwood Mysteries
- Dave
- Downton Abbey
- The Fall
- Fear The Walking Dead
- The Five-Star Weekend
- Hannibal
- The Hundred Code
- Insecure
- In Treatment
- Justified
- Last Call: When a Serial Killer Stalked Queer New York
- Moonlighting
- Mr. Bean
- The Paris Murders
- Revival
- Savior Complex
- The Shield
- Suits
- Telemarketers
- The Walking Dead
- Westworld

=== Former programming ===
- The Affair
- Allegiance
- American Horror Story Apocalypse
- The Americans
- Bates Motel
- Better Things
- Big Little Lies
- Breaking Bad
- Boardwalk Empire
- Bored to Death
- Braquo
- Brotherhood
- Californication
- The Corner
- Dexter
- Divorce
- Eastbound & Down
- Elementary
- Entourage
- The Firm
- Funny or Die Presents
- Game of Thrones
- Generation Kill
- Girls
- The Good Wife
- Graceland
- House of Cards
- House of Saddam
- House of the Dragon
- How to Make It in America
- Hung
- In Treatment
- John Adams
- The Killing
- Law & Order: SVU
- The Life and Times of Tim
- Lip Service
- Longmire
- Looking
- Mad Men
- Major Crimes
- Mildred Pierce
- Nashville
- The Newsroom
- Orange Is the New Black
- Outlander
- The Pacific
- Raised By Wolves
- The Riches
- The Ricky Gervais Show
- Rizzoli & Isles
- Rogue
- Romanzo criminale
- Saving Grace
- Sleeper Cell
- Scandal
- Shameless
- Sons of Anarchy
- The Sopranos
- Togetherness
- Treme
- True Blood
- The Tudors
- Vinyl
- The Walking Dead
- The West Wing
- White Collar
- The White Lotus

== See also ==
- Showtime movie channels
