= Neighbourhood Cable =

Australian regional cable TV provider

Neighbourhood Cable logo

Neighbourhood Cable was a telecommunications provider based in regional Victoria, Australia. The company owned and operated hybrid fibre coaxial (HFC) cable networks in three Victorian regional cities of Mildura, Ballarat and Geelong before being acquired by TransACT in 2007 and the brand ceased to be used in 2011.

The company delivered cable television, broadband internet and telephony services via these cable networks. It also offered internet services via Telstra's copper network and wireless equipment. It was one of the few companies in Australia selling non-Telstra local-loop services, and also one of only very few with active HFC networks.

== History ==
Neighbourhood Cable commenced the rollout of its hybrid fibre Optic/Coaxial network in Mildura on 1 March 1996, with the rollout to two thirds of homes and 90% of businesses in Mildura completed in two years.

By 2001, the company had run 900 kilometres worth of hybrid fibre coaxial cable past 38,000 homes in Mildura and Ballarat, with 1500 customers, and with planned rollouts in Bendigo, Geelong, Shepparton and Albury-Wodonga.

A number of subscription TV channels have solely or were first seen in Australia on their network. It was the only place in Australia where the US ESPN2 could be viewed, and was the first place some Discovery Channel variants and CNN Headline News were available.

The company was delisted from the Australian Securities Exchange in July 2005, after a string of events starting with a request for a further $5 million to continue operation. The company's venture capitalist, TVG, subsequently acquired all shares in the company.

In 2007, rival telecommunications company TransACT acquired Neighbourhood Cable, effective 1 January 2008. The operations of Neighbourhood Cable were rebranded as and merged with TransACT from June 2011.

== See also ==
- Subscription television in Australia
