= Foxtel Movies =

- Country: Australia

Programming
- Language: English
- Picture format: 576i (SDTV); 1080i (HDTV); 4K (UHDTV)
- Timeshift service: Premiere +2; Action +2; Family +2

Ownership
- Owner: Foxtel Networks
- Sister channels: Foxtel Networks channels

History
- Launched: 1 January 2016; 10 years ago
- Replaced: Movie Network; Showtime

Availability

Streaming media
- Foxtel Go: Watch live (Australia only)

Foxtel Movies is a suite of 11 pay television film channels in Australia which began broadcasting on 2 June 2016. Owned by Foxtel, the channels replaced the now-defunct Movie Network and Showtime suites.

== History ==
2016–2017 logo for Foxtel Movies

In June 2012, speculation arose that Foxtel would be looking at taking movies in-house at the end of 2012 when their contracts with Showtime and Movie Network expired. This would allow Foxtel to make cost savings of a predicted 40% by making movie deals directly with the Hollywood studios.

On 11 October 2012, it was announced that Foxtel had acquired "certain assets" from the Premium Movie Partnership (PMP) shareholders, taking over managing and producing the Showtime channels from 31 October 2012.

Foxtel were in negotiations with Movie Network to acquire it, but it was believed that two of the Movie Network shareholders (Warner Bros. & Village Roadshow) had broken ranks and begun negotiations with Foxtel for their movie rights. On 6 December 2012, it was announced that Movie Network would fold on 2 June 2016, being not permitted to sell the company to Foxtel or renew their contract.

On 9 December 2012, Foxtel announced they would launch a new lineup of channels branded Foxtel Movies. The channels would offer films from four major film companies – 20th Century Fox, Paramount Pictures, Sony Pictures, & NBCUniversal (rights acquired from Foxtel's acquisition of Showtime).

On 20 December 2012, Foxtel announced a movie deal with Village Roadshow. On 21 December 2012, Foxtel announced a movie deal with Warner Bros.

Over 600 posts were made on Foxtel's Facebook page within three days after Foxtel Movies' launch, all criticising Foxtel's changes in that the total amount of channels was reduced from 15 to 11 yet the price remained the same. On 17 January 2013, in response to the outrage by subscribers, Foxtel launched an additional two timeshift channels (Family + 2 and Action/Adventure + 2).

On 21 February 2013, Foxtel announced they had finalised agreements with The Walt Disney Company and MGM, resulting in Foxtel having agreements with all the major studios and distributors.

On 15 October 2013, it was announced that Foxtel had reached distribution agreements with StudioCanal, Hopscotch Entertainment One, Icon, and Transmission Films – four of Australia's key independent movie distributors.

On 1 January 2014, Action/Adventure, Drama/Romance and Thriller/Crime were renamed Action, Romance and Thriller respectively. Despite these changes, the programming of each channel remained constant. All three channels launched new logos and themes.

On 10 April 2014, Foxtel Movies launched Foxtel Movies Disney, a channel dedicated to Disney's animated, live action and Pixar films. On 28 March 2015, a timeshift channel for Foxtel Movies Disney launched, coinciding with its first birthday.

On 1 July 2016, Foxtel Movies launched Foxtel Movies More, a channel which features a mixture of films which air as themed events, as well as encompassing Foxtel Movies' pop-up channels.

On 23 March 2018, Foxtel Movies launched Foxtel Movies Greats, a channel dedicated to the all-time greatest movies ever made. This genre-themed channel fills the void left by the two channels offered by Foxtel Movies predecessors (Showtime's Showtime Greats and Movie Networks' Movie Greats) and the cessation of Foxtel offering TCM in 2016.

On 7 November 2019, The Walt Disney Company ended its output agreement with Foxtel Movies. This saw the closure of Foxtel Movies Disney and removal of all the films from Disney companies such as Walt Disney Pictures, Walt Disney Animation Studios, Pixar, Lucasfilm, Touchstone Pictures, Hollywood Pictures and Marvel Studios. Foxtel Movies' output agreement with Disney subsidiary 20th Century Fox (now 20th Century Studios) was maintained. These changes occurred as Disney prepared to the Australian launches of Disney+ on 19 November 2019 and Star on February 23, 2021. Foxtel Movies replaced Foxtel Movies Disney with Foxtel Movies Kids. Foxtel Movies also made further changes to the suite of channels including rebranding Foxtel Movies Masterpiece as Foxtel Movies Drama, and Foxtel Movies More as Foxtel Movies Hits; and the launch of Foxtel Movies UltraHD, which screens movies in 4K ultra-high-definition. It was originally reported that Foxtel Movies would also rebrand Foxtel Movies Greats as Foxtel Movies Masterpiece at this time; however, this did not occur.

On 7 November 2019, it was announced Foxtel Movies' parent company Foxtel had entered a new output agreement with NBCUniversal which included premiere subscription television rights for Foxtel Movies from NBCUniversal's subsidiary studios Universal Pictures and DreamWorks Animation.

On 1 September 2020, Foxtel Movies launched a localised version of the Lifetime Movie Network.

On 21 October 2021, it was announced Foxtel Movies' parent company Foxtel had entered a new output agreement with ViacomCBS which included library and premiere subscription television rights for Foxtel Movies from ViacomCBS' subsidiary studio Paramount Pictures.

== Channels ==
Foxtel Movies consists of 11 themed channels, all with a HD simulcast. Three of these channels (Premiere, Action and Family) have a 2-hour SD timeshift channel. There is also one UHDTV channel. The following are listed in order of LCN location:

- UltraHD: Channel consists of movies in ultra-high-definition sourced from the full suite of channels.
- Premiere: Main channel of the suite, featuring mainly newer Hollywood films and some domestic content.
- Hits: Channel consists mainly of popular films and franchise films across genres, and the home of Foxtel Movies' pop-up channels.
- Family: Channel consists mainly of family and children's films.
- Action: Channel consists mainly of action-adventure, and science fiction films.
- Comedy: Channel consists mainly of comedy films.
- Romance: Channel consists mainly of romance and romantic comedy films.
- Drama: Channel consists mainly of drama films.
- Greats: Channel mainly consists of acclaimed movies across genres.
- Lifetime Movie Network: Channel is dedicated to mainly drama films highlighting women's stories.

=== Pop-up channels ===
In the summer of 2015/16, Foxtel Movies offered two pop-up channels:

- Best of 2015: available 19–31 December 2015, the channel featured the best movies of 2015.
- Heroes: available 1–10 January 2016, the channel featured hero and action themed films. The face of the channel was actor Chris Hemsworth.

In February 2016, Foxtel Director of Television Brian Walsh announced the two summer channels were ratings successes and as a result more pop-up channels would launch in the future.

Over the 2016 Easter long weekend, Foxtel Movies launched a Harry Potter themed pop-up channel, airing the series of 8 movies back-to-back.

From 8 July until 11 July 2016, Foxtel Movies launched a The Fast and the Furious themed pop-up channel, airing all seven films back-to-back.

From 22 July until 31 July 2016, Foxtel Movies launched a Star Trek themed pop-up channel, airing all twelve films back-to-back.

From 30 September until 3 October 2016, Foxtel Movies launched a Star Wars themed pop-up channel, airing all seven movies back-to-back.

From 29 October until 31 October 2016, Foxtel Movies launched an A Nightmare on Elm Street themed pop-up channel in celebration of Halloween, airing all nine movies back-to-back.

In celebration of Christmas, a 12 Days of Christmas pop-up channel featuring Christmas-themed movies was available from 14 December until 25 December 2016.

Similar to Foxtel Movies inaugural pop-up channel, a Best of 2016 channel was available from 26 December until 31 December 2016. Featured films included Mad Max: Fury Road, The Martian, and Jurassic World.

A Star Wars-themed pop-up channel, featuring all seven movies back-to-back launched on 1 January 2017, and was available until 5 January 2017. The channel coincided with the death of Star Wars actress Carrie Fisher.

From 26 January until 29 January 2017, a Resident Evil themed pop-up channel launched, airing the first five films. The launch coincided with the theatrical release of the sixth and final installment of the series and the Australia Day public holiday.

From 24 February until 27 February 2017, Foxtel Movies launched a Batman vs Superman themed pop-up channel featuring 14 Batman and Superman movies.

Coinciding with Arnold Schwarzenegger's visit to Australia, from 17 March to 20 March 2017 a Schwarzenegger dedicated pop-up channel launched, featuring 19 of his films; including titles such as Conan the Barbarian, Total Recall, Terminator 2: Judgment Day, and Escape Plan.

From 14 April until 17 April 2017, coinciding with the Easter weekend, Foxtel Movies launched an X-Men themed pop-up channel, airing all nine movies back-to-back.

From 12 May until 15 May 2017, Foxtel Movies launched an Alien vs. Predator themed pop-up channel, airing 10 movies from the Alien, Predator and Alien vs. Predator franchises back-to-back. The channel coincided with the theatrical release of Alien: Covenant.

From 19 January until 21 January 2018, Foxtel Movies launched a Heath Ledger dedicated pop-up channel, airing 17 of his most popular and critically acclaimed films. The channel coincided with the 10 year anniversary of the Australian actor's death.
