= TransACT =

Australian telecommunications company

TransACT Capital Communications
- Type: Subsidiary
- Industry: Satellite television Telecommunications
- Founded: July 2000
- Defunct: March 2022
- Headquarters: Canberra, Australia
- Products: Direct broadcast satellite, Pay television, Pay-per-view, broadband internet, cable television, land-line and Wireless services
- Parent: TPG
- Website: www.transact.com.au

TransACT was the trading name of TransACT Capital Communications, an Australian telecommunications company based in Canberra which provided wholesale broadband internet access, fixed telephony, cable television services, and mobile phone services in Canberra and a subset of these services in Queanbeyan, throughout South-east New South Wales and in Victoria.

In November 2011, TransACT was acquired by iiNet Limited, which in 2015 itself became a subsidiary of TPG. It continues to trade as TransACT. Previously, the company was part-owned by Actew Corporation a 50% joint venture partner in ActewAGL (the main energy and water utility company in the Australian Capital Territory).

In March 2022, The TransACT Name was discontinued and customers were moved to the iiNet Group, a Subsidiary of TPG Telecom

== History ==
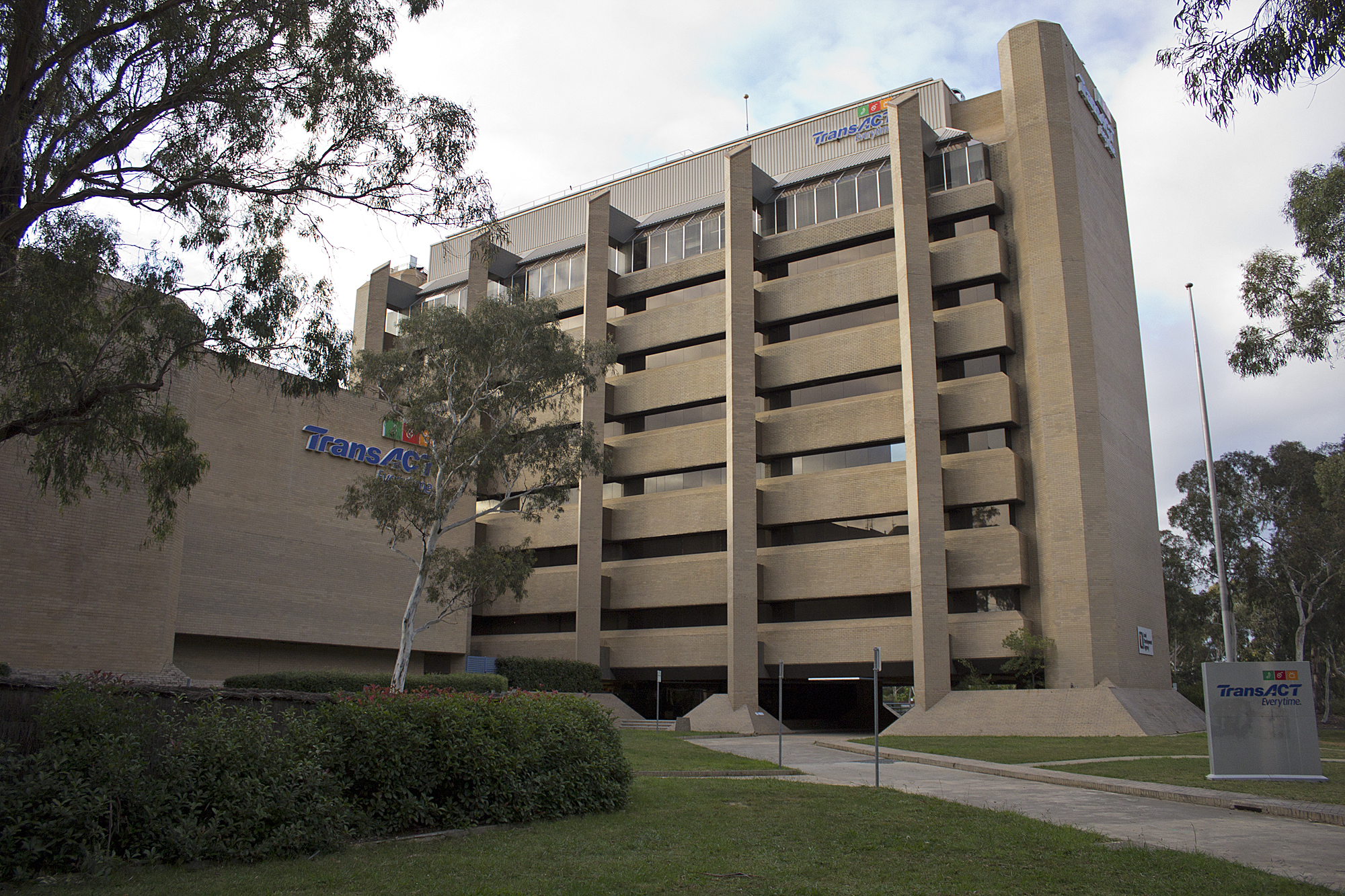
TransACT headquarters in Dickson, Australian Capital Territory

TransACT was launched in 1996 by a small team comprising Robin Eckermann (Chief Architect), Joe Ceccato, Robert Clarke and Jane Taylor, working under the guidance of ACTEW Executive Neville Smith. The company adopted an Open Access Network (OAN) business model, separating the wholesale and retail businesses.

TransACT operates in collaboration with ten Internet service providers (ISPs), comprising a mix of large national organisations and smaller local operations. One of the ISPs (Grapevine) which was previously owned by both TransACT and ActewAGL became a wholly owned subsidiary in March 2010.

The company has an extensive fibre network in the ACT. SDH, ATM and IP/MPLS Metro Ethernet technologies are used to deliver services via dedicated hubs or gateways that are built around the region. Services are delivered to various businesses, government departments and residential customers via a diverse range of access networks.

At the end of 2007, the company acquired the regional Victoria telecommunications company Neighbourhood Cable, with its hybrid fibre coaxial (HFC) cable networks and customers in three Victorian regional cities of Mildura, Ballarat and Geelong, and rebranded it as TransACT in June 2011.

The first broadband platform rolled out known as Phase 1 network was based on FTTC (fibre to the curb) design with nodes being placed within 300 metres of premises. SDH backbone is used to transport voice, data and video whereas VDSL technology is used as the access network to get customers connected to TransACT's high-speed broadband and digital TV services. Coincidentally, TransACT also became the first telco in Australia to implement this particular high-speed broadband technology much superior to ADSL, which was prominent throughout the country at that time. TransACT remains as the only telco to support VDSL and the products are still actively sold with network reach-ability to over 55,000 homes in the ACT.

The Phase 2 rollout involved TransACT placing its own DSLAM equipment within Telstra exchanges and utilising their own fibre-optic backhaul to their main data centre in Dickson, ACT. TransACT completed their ADSL 2/2+ rollout on 1 March 2007. The Phase 2 network is available to anyone outside Phase 1 with a Telstra phone line in Canberra and Queanbeyan, as long as they are within sufficient distance of their telephone exchange – as with any ADSL service.

In 2009, TransACT commenced a greenfield rollout and upgrade of existing VDSL access network to VDSL2, the most advanced and fastest digital subscriber line (DSL) broadband technology commercially available, commencing with a number of medium- to high-density developments in Canberra's more established suburbs. The upgrade increases broadband speeds by up to four times, compared to the fastest existing ADSL2+ networks used by most carriers. As with the existing VDSL network, VDSL2 products also include triple-play services. By mid-2009, multiples sites including The Avenue on Northbourne Avenue, Skyplaza in Woden and The Gateway at Kingston Foreshore were upgraded to VDSL2 with more projects currently underway.

The telco is the first in the country to build a dedicated G.984 (GPON) based FTTH or FTTP gateway and also the first provider in Australia to offer broadband services at up to 100 Mbit/s download and 20 Mbit/s upload speeds which were made available on 4 September 2009. The gateway built in the suburb of Forde close to the Gungahlin township trunks back to TransACT's core network in Dickson via a high-bandwidth MPLS backbone. With such infrastructure in place, TransACT is able to offer triple-play services to customers via fibre without the need for any copper in the path, thus enabling higher bit-rates. Similar PON technology and network hierarchy has been chosen by NBNco Limited, the company established in 2009 to design, build and operate the National Broadband Network

As of end of 2009, five new greenfield suburbs, namely Forde, Franklin, Crace, Casey, Bonner, some parts of Kingston and the Flemington road corridor, were all wired up for this next-generation technology with many new suburbs expected to come on board in the ACT region. As of mid-2010, the total number of premises passed through had reached almost 11,000.

TransACT also offers a range of wholesale services to business and ISP customers, including Colocation, IP transit, peering, data centre services, VPN, managed services, point-to-point and point-to-multipoint services including VPWS and VPLS services of up to 1 Gbit/s for customers anywhere on their network.

In July 2010, they launched the 'eHub', Australia's first commercial IPTV product bundled with a set-top box capable of handling high-definition video with an onboard personal video recorder.

TransACT is the naming rights sponsor of the TransACT Canberra Capitals, a Canberra team competing in the Women's National Basketball League (WNBL) from October to February each year. TransACT first sponsored the Capitals in 2000, when the new company was looking for a community partner.

In November 2011, iiNet confirmed plans to acquire TransACT for $60m. At the time TransACT had about 40,000 customers throughout the ACT, Queanbeyan and regional Victoria, across the residential, business and government sectors, and had "total recurring annual revenue" of about $80 million and earnings before interest, tax, depreciation and amortisation of $17 million. It was also reported that the TransACT network consisted of 4,500 kilometres of broadband and 40,000 customers, including 50 lucrative contracts with government departments, that had cost $280 million to build over 10 years.

In March 2022, iiNet had started to wind down the TransACT Brand, moving all customers to the iiNet brand and discontinuing the TransACT Name

In 2022 TPG Telecom moved the TransACT VDSL 2 Network to its Vision Network wholesale arm. As a functionally separated, wholly owned subsidiary of TPG Telecom Limited Vision Network offers connectivity via a raft of technologies, including HFC in Geelong, Ballarat and Mildura, Victoria; FTTB and fibre-to-the-premises (FTTP) in metropolitan Brisbane, Sydney, Melbourne, Adelaide and Perth; and fibre-to-the-node (FTTN) services in Canberra. In total, around 400,000 premises are covered by the company's infrastructure.

In mid-2024, Vision Network announced that it has completed speed upgrades for 295,000 premises to G.fast technology FTTB and FTTN network. It has since enabled ‘near-gigabit speeds’ across 83% of its footprint.

The upgrades to G.fast deliver a technically superior alternative to the NBN in parts of Canberra where both the TransACT network and NBN FTTN are both available. Retailers such as Infinite Networks and iiNet offer near-gigabit speeds on the upgraded Vision G.Fast network in Canberra, ACT.

== Grapevine ==
Grapevine was an Internet retail service provider based in Canberra, Australia, wholly owned by TransACT. It provides dial-up and broadband ISP services, delivered across the TransACT broadband network.

The company had its beginning in ActewAGL Net Connect, a wholly owned subsidiary of ActewAGL, that started in 2003. In April 2005, it was relaunched as Grapevine that was jointly owned by ActewAGL, the main utility company in the region, and TransACT until May 2010 when ActewAGL sold its share of Grapevine to TransACT.

== Channels ==
TransACT defined a virtual channel order that groups channels by their content.

Channels include Channel Nine, WIN Television, Fashion TV, Animal Planet, DMAX, TLC, Discovery Channel, ESPN, Eurosport, beIN Sports, CNN, BBC News, CNBC, Bloomberg TV Australia, CNA, Euronews, CGTN, Al Jazeera, CCTV-4, Zee TV, Zee News, Zee Cinema, WION, Federal Parliament – House Of Representatives, Federal Parliament – Senate, Federal Parliament – Committees, EWTN, Australian Christian Channel, ERT World, RTP Internacional, TV5Monde, Deutsche Welle TV, ABC On Demand, Movies On Demand, Sports On Demand, Docos On Demand, Luxury On Demand and AdultShop On Demand.

== See also ==
- Subscription television in Australia
