= Austar =

Defunct Australian telecommunication company

Austar Communications
- Formerly: Community Entertainment Television
- Type: Public
- Traded as: ASX: AUN
- Industry: Telecommunications
- Founded: 1995
- Defunct: 24 May 2012
- Successor: Foxtel
- Headquarters: Sydney, Australia
- Key people: John Porter (CEO); Mike Fries (Chairman)
- Products: Direct broadcast satellite; cable television; internet access; mobile phone
- Revenue: $711 million (2010)
- Website: austar.com.au

Austar was an Australian telecommunications company founded in 1995 as Community Entertainment Television (CETV). Its main business activity was subscription television. It was also involved with internet access and mobile phones.

Austar's television subscriber base grew to 747,148 (on 30 June 2010), making it the largest subscription television operator in urban and rural Australia. Austar provided subscription television services to 2.4 million homes, a third of all homes in Australia, primarily using digital satellite technology. Austar also operated a digital cable network in Darwin.

Foxtel acquired Austar in 2012. After the acquisition, Foxtel progressively merged all operations into the national system. Starting mid- to late 2013, Foxtel transitioned all accounts to Foxtel and removed the MyStar-related online services, which was the last step in the merge. In November 2013, the Foxtel IQ units were made available with satellite connections for those who wished to replace their MyStar units. The current Foxtel moniker took over all Austar branding in 2014, completing the transition. Austar provided services to Sega Channel in Australia in partnership with Namco Bandai Partners, a joint venture between Sega, Ozisoft, and Foxtel.

== Foxtel takeover ==
On 11 July 2011, Austar announced that it had entered into definitive transaction agreements with Liberty Global, (LGI) and Foxtel to acquire Austar under a scheme of arrangement. This takeover involved a minority shareholder approval on 30 March 2012, the approval of the Australian Competition & Consumer Commission on 10 April 2012, and had approval from a Second Court Hearing. The Austar shares were suspended on the Australian Securities Exchange (ASX) as of 16 April 2012, and were delisted from the ASX on 27 April 2012. The takeover was completed on 24 May 2012.

== Subscription television (Austar Television/Austar Digital) ==
Subscription Growth
Year	Subscribers
1998	300,000
2000	400,000
2004	443,000
2005	500,000+
2006	600,000+
2007	658,087
2008^{a}	713,000
June 2010	747,148
2011	755,374

Austar's main business was subscription television, serving customers outside of the major metro areas. It took programming from both Foxtel and Optus services, and operated on a digital platform.

Austar Television was available in 2.4 million homes in regional areas of New South Wales, Victoria, Queensland and South Australia and all areas of Tasmania and the Northern Territory. Subscriber numbers to Austar Television were second behind Foxtel. Delivery methods include utilising the Optus C-Class Satellite Optus C1 and a digital cable network in Darwin.

=== On Demand (Featured) ===
Austar featured On Demand, used to deliver Austar shows on-demand to MyStar each week to those with a MyStar subscription. It has since been replaced by Foxtel On Demand.

=== Austar AnyWhere ===
Austar AnyWhere was Austar's online TV service, which allowed customers to watch or download full-length programs online. Austar Anywhere closed on 30 June 2013.

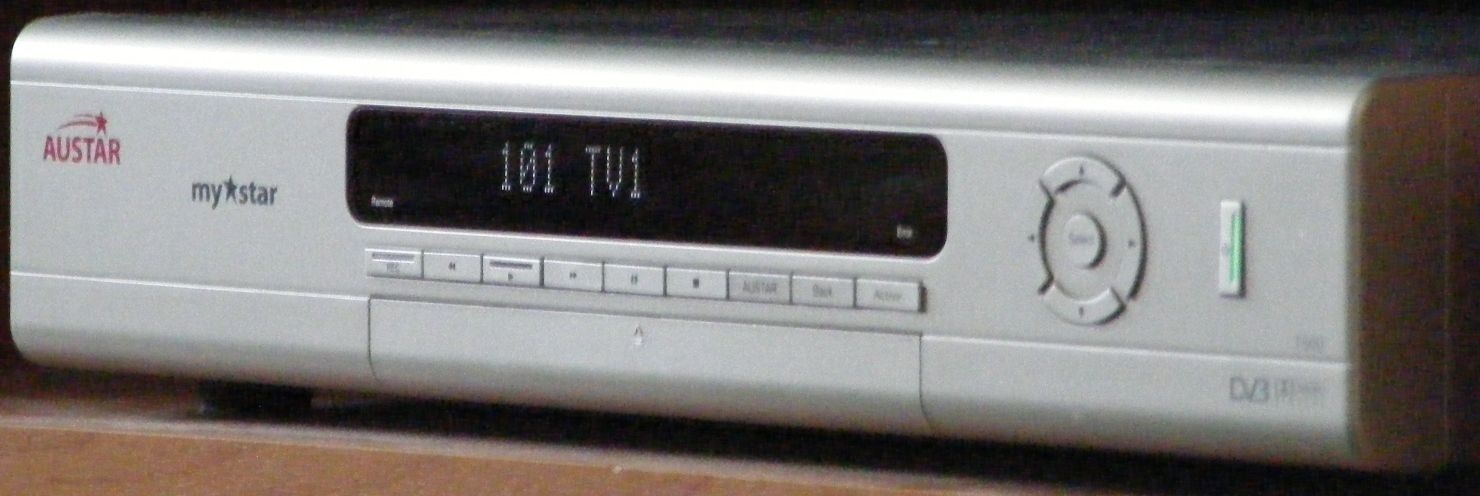
MyStar PVR

=== The MyStar personal digital recorder ===
MyStar was launched to existing subscribers in late 2007, with a general launch to both new and existing customers in February 2008.

The last MyStar was the model T500. It was a four-tuner set-top box equipped with two satellite tuners and two terrestrial tuners available both for viewing and recording standard definition digital free-to-air services including full electronic program guide data for Seven Network, WIN Television, Prime Television and Network Ten. (ABC, SBS and ABC2 continue to be provided via satellite). However, only two tuners can be used because the processor is not capable of handling all four tuners at once.

It featured a 160 GB hard drive, with 120 GB user accessible. It could record 60 hours of content. Because it is equipped with Macrovision copy protection, content saved to the MyStar cannot be transferred to other media (such as VHS or DVD) without the use of something such as a video stabiliser. It had support for time shifting for up to one hour.

Support for Dolby Digital Surround Sound was available on selected programming when connected to appropriate equipment, however the Mystar box wouldn't control the volume when using optical or coax, the volume had to be controlled by the device it was plugged into. It also had support for Closed Captioning and four different aspect ratios (4:3 Cropped, 16:9 Letterbox, 16:9 Postcard and 16:9 Widescreen). Both of these features were accessible through the remote's coloured buttons.

It supported additional outputs not found in some of the standard decoders, such as component video, as well as both coaxial and optical digital audio outputs. Support for Composite Video, S-Video and RF out were also available. It also had USB and Ethernet ports, but they didn't have a clear function as yet, and were likely to be used for updating the decoder.

The MyStar Remote is similar to the standard Austar Digital remote, but it had the addition of buttons specific to recording and playing back video. It shared an almost identical design to the Foxtel iQ remote, with the exception that it has an Austar button instead of a Foxtel button, and there was no AV button.

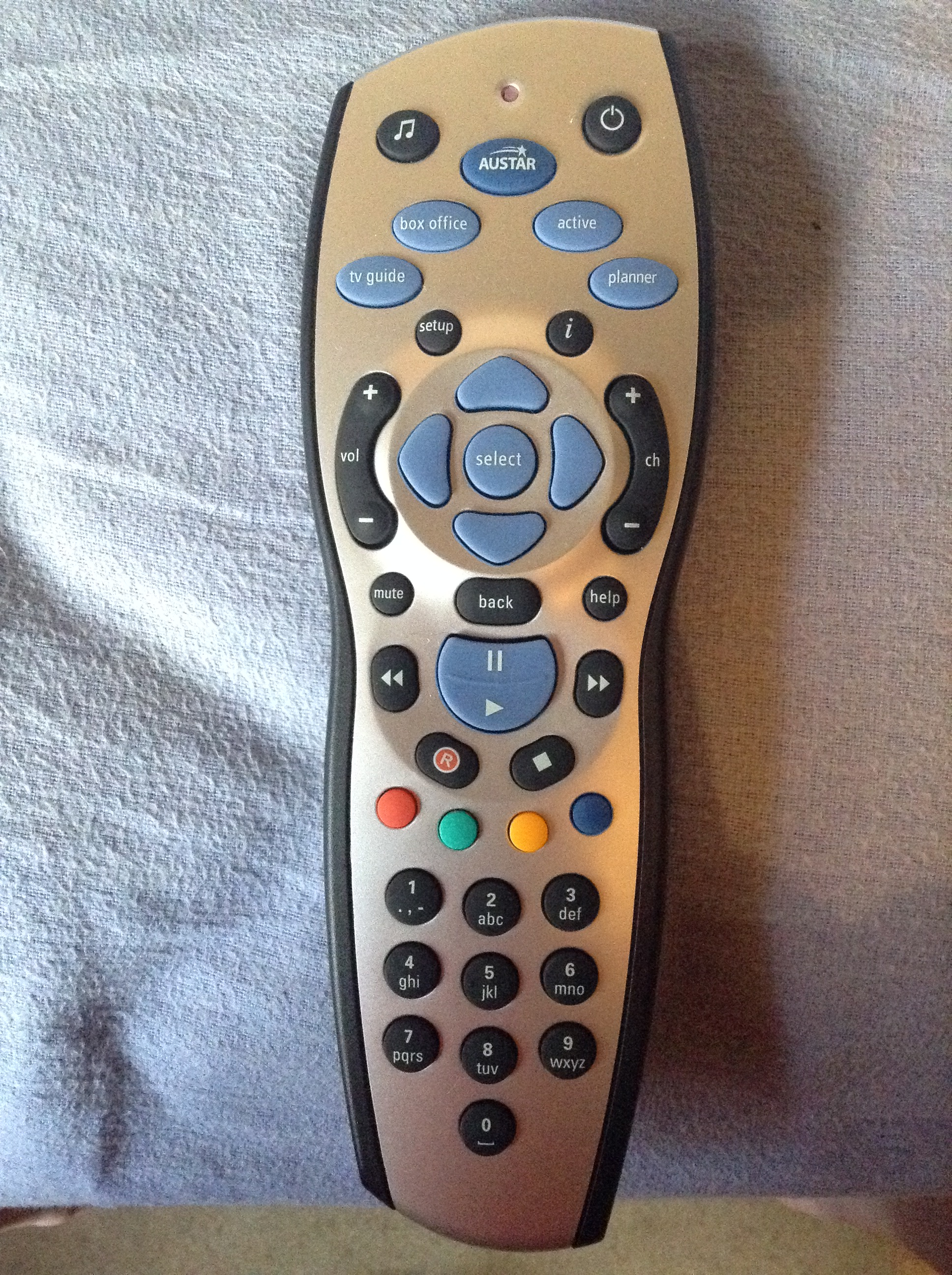
Austar MyStar Remote Control (Manufactured by Philips)

The next generation of MyStar, called MyStar HD, was launched on 15 November 2009, with installations beginning the following day. It had many advantages over its predecessor, most notably support for 1080i, HD programming. It included a 320 GB hard disk, a doubling over the 160 GB found in the original MyStar. Only 160 GB of this was available for recordings and other user-selected content, with the other 160 GB being reserved for OnDemand content, which was launched in early 2010. MyStar HD also included an HDMI output, allowing HD content to be viewed in its native resolution. It had a model number of T600 and also a T601.

Austar planned to use MyStar HD as its cornerstone set-top box, with true video-on-demand launched in 2010, and more access to web content becoming available after that time, building up to a complete interface redesign for its set-top boxes in late 2011 or early 2012. Since the Foxtel acquisition, these plans have changed. The plan was originally to upgrade MyStar and phase it out in 2014, however, in 2013, Foxtel decided to convert their IQHD units to satellite connections and made them available to "Austar" customers in November 2013. Foxtel had no plans to force current MyStar subscribers to replace their unit. If they don't wish, however, they are offering upgrades to customers who wish to take advantage before the IQ3 launch in 2015.

=== Mystar criticism ===
MyStar had ongoing technical issues which have plagued the system since release; however, Austar have said that "they have a huge team of people that will actively jump onto any issues as soon as they are reported to the call centre". Some of the numerous bugs included the MyStar box regularly causing the screen to black out, recordings to fail, and the screen to freeze. The box has also been reported to automatically switch itself off and on.

== Austar Mobile (mobile telephony) ==
Established in 2000, Austar Mobile offered mobile services via resale agreements with Optus [GSM] mobile network. After the closure of Telstra's CDMA network, Austar mobile would only offer services through Optus. Austarmobile, on 31 December 2009, had 19,970 customers.

== Dial-up internet (Austarnet) ==
In August 2011, Austarnet announced its exit from the Internet business and indicated that services would be discontinued on 30 September 2011.

== Broadband internet (Austar Broadband) ==
Established in 2006, Austar Broadband operated as a trial network in Wagga Wagga and Tamworth, New South Wales.

=== Austar/Unwired Alliance ===
In 2005, Austar United and wireless internet provider Unwired announced a deal to swap spectrum under either company's control to allow for interoperable wireless broadband services across the country. In 2006, Austar United and Unwired together with Soul Converged Telecommunications formed AUSAlliance for the purposes of obtaining funding from the Australian Government's Broadband Connect Infrastructure Program and rolling out a regional broadband network.

=== Austar/Opel agreement ===
In 2008, Austar entered into an agreement to sell its 2.5 & 3.5 GHz spectrum licences to the OPEL consortium (Optus & Elders) for A$65 million and enter into a wholesale agreement with Optus for the resale of products operated by the OPEL consortium. The sale was contingent on the OPEL network rollout, so was cancelled upon the cancellation of the OPEL network by the Australian Government.

== See also ==
- Subscription television in Australia

== Notes ==
1. ^a At 30 September 2008
