= 2016 in Australian television =

This is a list of Australian television related events, debuts, finales, and cancellations that were scheduled to occur in 2016, the 61st year of continuous operation of television in Australia.

== Events ==
=== January ===
Date	Event	Source
1	The ABC's coverage of Sydney New Year's Eve is widely panned for the third consecutive year, with criticism of lame skits and pre-recorded performances.	
24	The Seven Network controversially broadcasts close up shots of Daria Gavrilova's training notes multiple times during its broadcast of the 2016 Australian Open.	
28	Stan signs an exclusive rights agreement with CBS Corporation and Showtime Networks.	

=== February ===
Date	Event	Source
1	Seven Network's breakfast show Sunrise gets a new on-air presentation and studio set, replacing the unchanged package which has been introduced in January 2010.	
1	Samantha Jade is announced as the inaugural TV Week Logie Awards Ambassador	
1	Mark Labbett is "unleashed" as the fifth Chaser on The Chase Australia.	
7	The official 2016 OzTam television ratings period begins.	
10	Weekend Today co-host Cameron Williams quits the Nine Network after stalled contract negotiations. However, he would return to the network less than twelve months later to replace the retiring Ken Sutcliffe as the sports presenter on Nine News Sydney.	
11	WIN Television launch legal action against Nine Network for streaming its metropolitan channels into WIN's regional markets via its 9Now app.	
12	Samantha Armytage is dumped from hosting a UNHCR event in Sydney, following an awkward skit on Sunrise a day earlier involving UNHCR spokesperson Kristin Davis.	
14	Garry Lyon quits The AFL Footy Show citing mental health issues.	
15	OzTAM release the first Video Player Measurement (VPM) ratings, which measure viewership of catch up platforms.	
17	Seven West Media report a first half net profit of $135.2 million, despite a 2% decrease in total television revenue (equating to $14.3 million).	
19	Foxtel launches legal action to block access to four torrent websites, it accuses of illegally distributing its programs, under recently introduced legislation which can force Australian Internet service providers to block website access with a Federal Court order.	
19	The Seven and Nine Networks reach a settlement in the Federal Court over a copyright claim on Nine's program The Hotplate. The settlement sees Nine agree not to produce any further seasons of the program, and to never rebroadcast or distribute the first season.	
23	The Turnbull Cabinet approve media reforms proposed by Minister for Communications Mitch Fifield which would see the removal of the 'reach rule' and the 'two out of three' rule from the Broadcasting Services Act 1992. The reforms need to pass the Senate before being enacted.	
25	A blackout at TCN causes Nine Network failing to broadcast the national Nine News Now bulletin, while the Sydney Nine Afternoon News bulletin had to be broadcast from the QTQ Brisbane studio.	
26	Actor Sam Johnson, best known for The Secret Life of Us and Molly, announces his retirement from acting to focus on fundraising for cancer research.	
29	Fetch TV secures exclusive rights to Viacom (VIMN), by confirming plans to launch the Australian version of Comedy Central.	

=== March ===
Date	Event	Source
1	The Coalition partyroom pass Minister for Communications Mitch Fifield's proposed media reforms. In addition to the removal of the 'two out of three' rule and 'reach rule', it is proposed that a quota system be introduced for regional content after a merger event.	
1	A 60 Minutes cameraman and producer are assaulted and injured while filming a story in Sweden on the European refugee crisis.	
2	Its announced that 14 months after being let go by Nine Network as a result of cost-cutting measures, Emma Freedman who formerly appeared on Weekend Today would return to the network as a presenter on Wide World of Sports.	
3	NRL legend Johnathan Thurston signs a five-year deal with Nine Network, which will see him co-host The Footy Show as well as provide commentary on NRL games and stories.	
7	Seven West Media sign a content deal with Google to stream their content internationally via YouTube.	
10	Billy Brownless reveals on The AFL Footy Show his ex-wife had an affair with his fellow co-host Garry Lyon.	
13	Four Corners reporter Linton Besser and camera operator Louie Eroglu are arrested in Kuching, Malaysia after approaching Malaysian Prime Minister Najib Razak for comment on his corruption scandal.	
14	14-year-old singer/guitarist Fletcher Pilon wins the eighth season of Australia's Got Talent.	
15	Ian Cook, a Melbourne pilot, and Quoc Huong Vu, a Sydney-based cameraman, are killed in an ultralight aircraft crash in northern Victoria while filming The Amazing Race Vietnam.	
18	Nine Entertainment Co. purchase a 9.9% stake in regional broadcaster Southern Cross Media from Macquarie Group for $1.15 a share, ahead of expected media reforms which will see the removal of the 'reach rule'.	
20	A two-week Easter break in OzTam television ratings begins.	
22	New streaming service hayu launches in Australia. The service, owned by NBCUniversal, is dedicated to reality programming, featuring titles from NBCUniversal's library – with titles including Keeping Up with the Kardashians, as well as The Real Housewives and Top Chef franchises.	
30	OzTam extend consolidated ratings from 7 days to 28 days.	
30	Network Ten enter regional affiliation discussions with WIN Television, which if are successful would see in June 2016 the end of a 27-year affiliation agreement between Nine Network and WIN Television.	

=== April ===
Date	Event	Source
1	TV historian Ken McKay is honoured for his work to the field and presented with the WA Heritage Award.	
3	Former Network Ten sports reporter Mel McLaughlin makes her debut appearance on Seven News Sydney. As a result, Jim Wilson moves to the Friday & Saturday role on the bulletin, and Ryan Phelan is removed.	
3	Television presenter Daryl Somers makes a television comeback on the Nine Network as host of You're Back in the Room.	
3	Official OzTam ratings resume after a two-week non-ratings period over Easter.	
5	Nine Network report an 11% drop in revenue for their third quarter, which saw their share price drop 24.7% to $1.14.	
6	A power outage in Mackay, Queensland caused by bamboo touching the high voltage power lines saw the area lose TV reception as the lines affected serviced the local TV transmitters and the back up generators failed to work.	
7	Former Seven News presenter Rebecca Maddern debuts as the first permanent female co-host on The AFL Footy Show.	
7	A 60 Minutes crew, including co-host Tara Brown, are detained in Beirut while filming a story on a custody battle.	
13	The four 60 Minutes crew members (reporter Tara Brown, senior producer Stephen Rice, cameraman Ben Williamson and sound recordist David Ballment) who had been detained in Beirut, Lebanon (see 7 April) are charged with four separate charges, including kidnapping, causing harm and not respecting local authority. If pleaded guilty, they could each face a maximum of over 20 years in jail.	
13	Seven Network's Commercial Manager of Programming John Fitzgerald is charged with falsifying invoices to steal company funds.	
13	Former At the Movies presenters Margaret Pomeranz and David Stratton receive honorary doctorates from Macquarie University for their contribution to the film industry.	
13	Australian actor Jack Charles is racially discriminated against in Melbourne, where he is refused taxi admittance twice in a single day. Charles had experienced this same form of racial prejudice in October 2015.	
16	Journalist and broadcaster Stan Grant is appointed to the federal government's Referendum Council.	
20	The 60 Minutes crew are released from Lebanese custody, with the personal charges against them dropped and Nine Network paying compensation for their release. However, they still face criminal charges.	
21	Network Ten report a first half profit of $13.4 million – the first time in four years they have reported a rise in profit.	
22	Commercial broadcasters Network Ten, Nine Network and Seven Network announce the launch of a new joint venture marketing company called Think TV which aims to persuade advertisers to continue to invest in free-to-air television.	
22	Legendary Australian broadcaster David Hill is honoured at the New York Festival with a Lifetime Achievement Award.	
27	Senior Constable Aaron Minns, who formerly appeared on Gold Coast Cops, pleads not guilty to four counts of common assault.	
28	In a landmark decision, the NSW Supreme Court ruled in favor of Nine Network over WIN Network in relation to Nine's online streaming of its metropolitan stations into WIN regions. The judge found streaming to not fall under the definition of broadcasting.	
28	A number of WIN Network Tasmania personnel are recognised at the Tasmanian Media Awards – namely sports reporter Brent Costelloe and cameraman Steve Fisher who won in the Best Sports Journalist and Best News Image categories respectively.	
29	Nine Entertainment Co. ends a 27-year affiliation agreement with WIN Corporation, instead partnering with Southern Cross Austereo in parts of regional Queensland, New South Wales and Victoria, after securing a 50% revenue sharing deal with Southern Cross, higher than its 39% deal with WIN.	

=== May ===
Date	Event	Source
3	The 2016 Australian federal budget gives commercial broadcasters receive a 25% reduction in licence fees, while renewed tri-annual funding arrangements will see the ABC receive $3.1 billion and SBS $814 million over the next three years.	
6	Home and Away director Geoffrey Nottage is awarded the Australian Directors Guild Awards' The Michael Carson Award.	
8	The Logie Awards of 2016 are held, with Waleed Aly winning the Gold Logie and Noni Hazlehurst inducted into the Hall of Fame.	
15	Former The X Factor winner Dami Im comes second in the Eurovision Song Contest 2016.	
20	Network Ten renew their affiliation agreement with Southern Cross Ten for Northern New South Wales for an additional five years. The new agreement begins 1 July 2016.	
29	For the first time in the history of the Australian Directors Guild Awards the ceremony is broadcast on television, airing on Aurora.	

=== June ===
Date	Event	Source
1	Studio 10 is found to have breached its PG classification in a January episode.	
2	Former ABC boss Mark Scott accepts role as head of the NSW Department of Education.	
2	7flix changes from broadcasting in MPEG4 format to MPEG2, increasing its availability on older television sets.	
15	Seven decides not to proceed with program The Day the Cash Came, just a week before similar format The Briefcase premiered on Nine.	
21	SBS closes its internal international sales division	
28	Seven News US bureau chief Mike Amor is named television journalist of the year at the 58th Southern California Journalism Awards	
30	A Current Affair host Tracy Grimshaw marks 35 years at the Nine Network.	

=== July ===
Date	Event	Source
3	Luke and Cody are named winners of the fourth season of House Rules.	
4	Seven News launch a Gold Coast bulletin. Its debut wins its timeslot with 49,000 viewers, defeating long-standing rival bulletin Nine Gold Coast News with 34,000 viewers.	
6	Catalyst presenter Maryanne Demasi is suspended, following an internal review of a February episode of the program found it breached impartiality standards.	
10	Alfie Arcuri wins the fifth season of The Voice.	

=== August ===
Date	Event	Source
2	Seven West Media announces a $207.3 million profit for the 2015–16 financial year, a fall of 0.9%.	
6	The Seven Network will broadcast the 2016 Summer Olympics.	
9	Former 60 Minutes reporter Michael Usher leaves the Nine Network and joins the Seven Network. He will present Seven News Investigates.	
22	Australia Plus, operated by the ABC, announce international partnerships with Monash University, the Victoria State Government and commercial company Swisse.	
23	Prime Media Group announce a $93.5 million loss for the 2015–16 financial year.	
25	Southern Cross Austereo announce a $77.2 million profit for the 2015–16 financial year, a rise of 19%.	
25	Nine Entertainment Co. announce a $324.8 million profit for the 2015–16 financial year.	
29	Edwin Daly wins $1 million on Millionaire Hot Seat, becoming the first contestant to do so in the program's seven-year history.	

=== September ===
Date	Event	Source
2	Southern Cross Television in Tasmania is found to have breached election advertising rules	
13	The Seven and Nine Networks agree to share aerial visions in capital city markets, saving helicopter operating expenses	
16	Television in Australia turns 60.	
19	ABC's kids channel ABC3 is rebranded as ABC ME.	
21	Matt Eagles wins the second season of The Recruit	
24	Saturday Disney ends after a 26-year run on the Seven Network.	
27	Kate wins the inaugural season of Zumbo's Just Desserts	
28	A power outage affecting the entire state of South Australia for several hours sees dramatically low viewership figures from Adelaide viewers, including ratings of zero for many programs.	

=== November ===
Date	Event	Source
26	The last day of the official 2016 OzTam television ratings period.	
26	The Seven Network wins the ratings season for the tenth consecutive year.	

=== December ===
Date	Event	Source
1	News Corp Australia becomes sole owner of Sky News Australia's parent company. Former co-owners Seven West Media, Nine Entertainment Co. and Sky plc will continue to supply content to Sky News and its sister channels.	

== Television channels ==
=== New channels ===
- 19 January – Sky News Business HD (high definition simulcast of Sky News Business)
- 28 February – 7flix
- 1 March — WIN HD (high definition simulcast of WIN)
- 2 March – Ten HD (high definition simulcast of Ten)
- 25 March – [V] Hits +2
- 1 April – Comedy Central
- 1 April – Sky Thoroughbred Central HD (high definition simulcast of Sky Thoroughbred Central)
- 1 May – Sky News Election Channel
- 10 May – 7HD (high definition simulcast of Seven in Melbourne and Adelaide, 7mate in other markets)
- 14 May – beIN Sports 1 HD (high definition simulcast of beIN Sports 1), beIN Sports 2, beIN Sports 2 HD (high definition simulcast of beIN Sports 2), beIN Sports 3, beIN Sports 3 HD (high definition simulcast of beIN Sports 3)
- 15 May – Sky News Election HD (high definition simulcast of Sky News Election Channel)
- 1 July – Foxtel Movies More, Foxtel Movies More HD (high definition simulcast of Foxtel Movies More), MUTV, MUTV HD (high definition simulcast of MUTV), Chelsea TV, Chelsea TV HD (high definition simulcast of Chelsea TV), LFC TV, LFC TV HD (high definition simulcast of LFC TV), Spike
- 24 July – Hillsong Channel
- 5 October – Binge, A&E + 2 (2 hour timeshift channel of A&E)
- 13 October – SonLife

=== Channel closures ===
- 25 March – Channel [V]
- 1 April – MTV Classic
- 30 April – 4ME
- 4 October – SoHo

=== Affiliation changes ===
- 1 July – Nine Network programming to air on the current Southern Cross Ten regional network in Queensland, Southern NSW and Victoria, joining existing South Australian services. Nine programming on Southern Cross will be branded with Nine's mainstream branding.
- 1 July – Network Ten programming to air on the current WIN Television regional network in Queensland, Southern NSW, Victoria, Mildura, Tasmania, Western Australia and Griffith.

== Celebrity deaths ==
Name	Date	Age	Broadcasting notability	Reference
Lois Ramsey	21 January	aged 93	Australian character actress best known for roles in soap operas Prisoner and The Box as Mrs. Hopkins	
Alethea McGrath	3 February	aged 95	Australian actress and voice artist, best known for film Star Wars: Episode II – Attack of the Clones and TV series Prisoner as Dot Farrer	
Peter Hudson			Television executive, most notable for managing the TV1 General Entertainment Partnership, which was responsible for TV1 and SF	
Don Battye	28 February	aged 77	Writer and producer most famous for his work on Neighbours, Sons and Daughters, and Homicide	
Sonia Borg	2 March	aged 85	Screenwriter most famous for Women of the Sun	
Jon English	10 March	aged 66	British-born Australian singer, performer of stage and screen, whose most notable productions included theatre roles in Jesus Christ Superstar and Pirates of Penzance and television roles including the miniseries Against the Wind and sitcom All Together Now	
Bob Ellis	3 April	aged 73	Australian writer whose credits include Number 96, Dynasty Australia, and Glenview High	
Barbara Jungwirth	13 April	?	Australian actress who appeared in series such as Neighbours and The Box, as well as being the longest serving background cast member on soap opera Prisoner	
Bruce Mansfield	17 April	aged 71	Radio and television personality	
Robert Greenberg	29 April	aged 57	Australian screenwriter who most notably worked on children's shows such as Round the Twist and Get Ace	
Reg Grundy (AC, OBE)	6 May	aged 92	Television producer, creator of the Australian version of Wheel Of Fortune and numerous soap opera dramas including Neighbours and Prisoner, founder of the Reg Grundy Organisation	
Scott Burgess	10 April	aged 56	Australian actor best known for his roles in Water Rats and 1915	
Lewis Fiander	24 May	aged 78	Australian actor best known for his roles in Pride and Prejudice and Bangkok Hilton	
Vivean Gray	28 July	aged 92	British-born Australian actress best known for her roles in Neighbours as Nell Mangel, in The Sullivans as Ida Jessup and Prisoner as Edna Pearson	
Norman "Nugget" May (AM)	11 September	aged 88	Radio and television sport commentator, best known as an Olympic commentator	
Ken Sparkes	11 September	aged 76	Australian radio and television personality, and voice over artist	
Peter Collingwood	23 September	aged 96	English Australian actor, Home and Away as Bert King	
Max Walker (AM)	28 September	age 68	Australian rules footballer, cricketer and media commentator	
Rebecca Wilson	2 October	aged 54	Australian sports commentator and panelist on Sunrise and SportsNight with James Bracey and television presenter of The Fat	
Ross Higgins	7 October	aged 86	Australian actor and voice-over artist, best known as the voice of Louie the Fly and Ted Bullpitt in Kingswood Country	
Anne Deveson	12 December	(aged 86)	Journalist, writer and broadcaster	

== Premieres ==
=== Domestic series ===
List of domestic television series premieres
Program	Original airdate	Network	Source
The Shapes	4 January	ABC3	
Tiny House Australia	4 January	LifeStyle Home	
Food Safari Fire	7 January	SBS	
The Family Law	14 January	SBS	
The Latest with Laura Jayes	18 January	Sky News Live	
Speers Tonight	28 January	Sky News Live	
I'm a Celebrity...Get Me Out of Here! Now!	31 January	Eleven	
First Dates	3 February	Seven Network	
Pyne & Marles	6 February	Sky News Live	
Karvelas	7 February	Sky News Live	
Here Come the Habibs	9 February	Nine Network	
Wanted	9 February	Seven Network	
The Point with Stan Grant	29 February	NITV	
All Star Family Feud	14 March	Network Ten	
Seven Year Switch	15 March	Seven Network	
Best Bits	15 March	Seven Network	
Long Lost Family	16 March	Network Ten	
Inside Heston's World	31 March	SBS	
You're Back in the Room	3 April	Nine Network	
Airlock	16 April	Syfy	
Tomorrow When the War Began	23 April	ABC3	
MTV Upload	5 May	MTV Music	
Trendy	6 May	Comedy Central	
Stage & Screen	11 May	Foxtel Arts	
Wolf Creek	12 May	Stan	
Tweet the Beat	16 May	V Hits	
Surfing the Menu: The Next Generation	22 May	ABC	
DNA Nation	17 May	SBS	
Kiss Bang Love	24 May	Seven Network	
Donna Hay: Basics to Brilliance	24 May	LifeStyle Food	
The NRL Rookie	31 May	9Go!	
Cleverman	2 June	ABC	
Melbourne Comedy Festival's Big Three-Oh!	3 June	The Comedy Channel	
Secret City	5 June	Showcase	
The Briefcase	20 June	Nine Network	
Slime Cup	1 July	Nickelodeon	
The Kettering Incident	4 July	Showcase	
Saturday Edition	9 July	Sky News Live	
Sunday Edition	10 July	Sky News Live	
The B Team with Peter Berner	16 July	Sky News Live	
Zumbo's Just Desserts	22 August	Seven Network	
Anh's Brush with Fame	24 August	ABC	
Doctor Doctor	14 September	Nine Network	
Unreal Estate	27 September	Nine Network	
I Own Australia's Best Home	28 September	LifeStyle Home	
The Wrong Girl	28 September	Network Ten	
The Secret Daughter	3 October	Seven Network	
Hyde & Seek	3 October	Nine Network	
Deep Water	5 October	SBS	
Martin Clunes: Islands of Australia	7 October	Seven Network	
Deadline Design with Shaynna Blaze	19 October	LifeStyle Home	
Say Yes to the Dress: Australia	26 October	TLC	
Sydney Harbour Patrol	30 October	Discovery Channel	
Credlin & Keneally	16 November	Sky News Live	
Pacific Heat	27 November	The Comedy Channel	
Whose Line is it Anyway? Australia	27 November	The Comedy Channel	
Prison: First & Last 24 Hours	Planned for 2016 but did not air	Nine Network	
Sex Ed	Planned for 2016 but did not air	Nine Network	
Sunday Night Takeaway	Planned for 2016 but did not air	Seven Network	
The Day the Cash Came	Production cancelled	Seven Network	
This Time Next Year	Delayed to 2017	Nine Network	
Travel Guides	Delayed to 2017	Nine Network	
Bride of Jaws	TBA	Discovery Channel	
Question Everything	TBA	Discovery Channel	

=== International series ===
List of international television series premieres
Program	Original airdate	Network	Country of origin	Source
Men, Women, Wild	5 January	Discovery Channel	United States	
Brainstormers	6 January	Discovery Science	United States	
Midwinter of the Spirit	6 January	BBC First	United Kingdom	
What Could Possibly Go Wrong?	7 January	Discovery Science	United States	
Sweets Made Simple	8 January	LifeStyle Food	United Kingdom	
Family Guns	9 January	A&E	United States	
My Big Redneck Vacation	9 January	A&E	United States	
The Getaway	9 January	Nat Geo People	United States	
Shadowhunters	13 January	Netflix	United States	
Kate & Mim-Mim	14 January	Disney Junior	Canada	
Bunk'd	14 January	Disney Channel	United States	
Mighty Magiswords	16 January	Cartoon Network	United States	
The Shannara Chronicles	16 January	Syfy	United States	
Idiot Sitter	18 January	The Comedy Channel	United States	
The Real Housewives of Potomac	18 January	Arena	United States	
Grossbusters	20 January	MTV	United States	
Just Jillian	20 January	E!	United States	
DC's Legends of Tomorrow	22 January	FOX8	United States	
Recipe for Deception	22 January	Arena	United States	
Life on Marbs	24 January	Arena	United Kingdom	
PJ Masks	25 January	9Go!	France	
Earth to Luna!	25 January	Discovery Kids	Brazil	
Billions	25 January	Stan	United States	
Baskets	26 January	The Comedy Channel	United States	
The Brokenwood Mysteries	27 January	13th Street	New Zealand	
Killjoys	30 January	Syfy	United States	
The X-Files	31 January	Network Ten	United States	
War & Peace	31 January	BBC First	United Kingdom	
Fresh Beat Band of Spies	1 February	Nick Jr.	United States	
Jay Leno's Garage	1 February	Discovery Turbo	United States	
Supernoobs	1 February	Cartoon Network	Canada	
Angel from Hell	2 February	Eleven	United States	
Hollywood Medium	2 February	E!	United States	
Next Step Realty: NYC	2 February	Arena	United States	
Bordertown	3 February	Eleven	United States	
Ellen's Design Challenge	3 February	Style	United States	
Black Gold	4 February	A&E	United States	
Crazy Ex-Girlfriend	4 February	Eleven	United States	
Food Porn	5 February	LifeStyle Food	United States	
LEGO Nexo Knights	6 February	Cartoon Network	Denmark	
Dickensian	7 February	BBC First	United Kingdom	
Game Shakers	8 February	Nickelodeon	United States	
Cuffs	13 February	ABC	United Kingdom	
Vinyl	15 February	showcase	United States	
WITS Academy	15 February	Nickelodeon	United States	
Impossible Engineering	16 February	Discovery Science	United States	
Animals.	17 February	The Comedy Channel	United States	
The Frankenstein Chronicles	18 February	BBC First	United Kingdom	
Love	19 February	Netflix	United States	
Her Story: The Female Revolution	20 February	BBC World News	United Kingdom	
Judge Rinder	22 February	LifeStyle You	United Kingdom	
Fuller House	26 February	Netflix	United States	
The Lion Guard	28 February	Disney Junior	United States	
The Hunt	2 March	Nine Network	United Kingdom	
Happyish	3 March	Stan	United States	
American Crime Story	6 March	Network Ten	United States	
Flaked	11 March	Netflix	United States	
Gigolos	11 March	Stan	United States	
Queens of Pop	12 March	Foxtel Arts	United States	
Capital	15 March	BBC First	United Kingdom	
Odyssey	20 March	Seven Network	United States	
Hemsley & Hemsley: Healthy & Delicious	21 March	LifeStyle Food	United Kingdom	
Galavant	22 March	7flix	United States	
Girlfriends' Guide to Divorce	23 March	Presto	United States	
Lost & Found Music Studio	1 April	Netflix	United States	
The Ranch	1 April	Netflix	United States	
Car Crash Couples	5 April	MTV	United Kingdom	
Heartbeat	7 April	Universal Channel	United States	
The Powerpuff Girls	9 April	Cartoon Network	United States	
Dice	10 April	Stan	United States	
Once Upon a Time in Wonderland	10 April	7flix	United States	
The Girlfriend Experience	11 April	Stan	United States	
Kong: King of the Apes	15 April	Netflix	United States	
Containment	20 April	Stan	United States	
Mad Dogs	22 April	Stan	United States	
Criminal Minds: Beyond Borders	25 April	Seven Network	United States	
Hoff the Record	27 April	The Comedy Channel	United Kingdom	
Bugging Out	28 April	MTV	United States	
Lucifer	4 May	FX	United States	
Hap and Leonard	5 May	Showcase	United States	
Marseille	5 May	Netflix	France	
The Unexplained Files	8 May	Discovery Science	United States	
Coast New Zealand	9 May	History	New Zealand	
60 Days In	11 May	CI	United States	
Chelsea	11 May	Netflix	United States	
The Magicians	13 May	Syfy	United States	
Blunt Talk	19 May	Stan	United States	
Great Wild North	25 May	A&E	United States	
Agent Carter	June	7flix	United States	
Guitar Star	2 June	Foxtel Arts	United Kingdom	
Word Party	3 June	Netflix	United States	
Outcast	4 June	FX	United States	
Rush Hour	9 June	Seven Network	United States	
Famously Single	16 June	E!	United States	
Undercover	19 June	BBC First	United Kingdom	
The Grinder	July	Eleven	United States	
Stranger Things	15 July	Netflix	United States	
Life in Pieces	27 July	Network Ten	United States	
Shades of Blue	2 August	Universal Channel	United States	
Queen of the South	4 August	showcase	United States	
Botched by Nature	11 August	E!	United States	
The Get Down	12 August	Netflix	United States	
Code Black	25 August	Seven Network	United States	
Rob & Chyna	12 September	E!	United States	
Million Dollar Listing New York	25 September	Arena	United States	
Quarry	3 October	showcase	United States	
Race for the White House	3 October	History	United States	
WAGS Miami	5 October	E!	United States	
Total Bellas	6 October	E!	United States	
The Catch	10 October	Seven Network	United States	
Catching Kelce	11 October	E!	United States	
Mum	11 October	BBC First	United Kingdom	
The American West	11 October	History	United States	
Divorce	12 October	showcase	United States	
Teachers	24 October	The Comedy Channel	United States	
Love, Nina	1 November	BBC First	United Kingdom	
High Maintenance	3 November	showcase	United States	
Insert Name Here	8 November	UKTV	United Kingdom	
Mars	13 November	National Geographic Channel	United States	
The Exorcist	4 December	showcase	United States	
Mariah's World	5 December	E!	United States	
Paranormal Lockdown	24 December	TLC	United States	
Grandfathered	TBA	7flix	United States	
The Family	TBA	Seven Network	United States	
Weather Gone Viral	TBA	Nine Network	United Kingdom	
Westworld	TBA	showcase	United States	
The Loud House	TBA	ABC Me	United States	

=== Telemovies and miniseries ===
List of domestic telemovie and miniseries premieres
Program	Original airdate(s)	Network	Source
Molly	7 February	Seven Network	
The Second	TBA	Stan	

List of international telemovie and miniseries premieres
Program	Original airdate(s)	Network	Country of origin	Source
Stakes	18 January	Cartoon Network	United States	
Long Live the Royals	26 January	Cartoon Network	United States	
The Lion Guard: Return of the Roar	6 February	Disney Junior	United States	
11.22.63	16 February	Stan	United States	
Crouching Tiger, Hidden Dragon: Sword of Destiny	26 February	Netflix	United States/China	
Pee-wee's Big Holiday	18 March	Netflix	United States	
The Night Manager	20 March	BBC First	United Kingdom	
Murder	23 March	BBC First	United Kingdom	
And Then There Were None	23 April	BBC First	United Kingdom/United States	
Special Correspondents	29 April	Netflix	United States	
Confirmation	22 May	Showcase	United States	
The Do-Over	27 May	Netflix	United States	
All the Way	29 May	Showcase	United States	
Maigret	12 June	BBC First	United Kingdom	
Looking: The Movie	28 July	Showcase	United States	
Sharknado: The 4th Awakens	1 August	Syfy	United States	

=== Documentaries ===
List of domestic television documentary premieres
Program	Original airdate(s)	Network	Source
Rod Taylor: Pulling No Punches	11 February	Foxtel Arts	

List of international television documentary premieres
Program	Original airdate(s)	Network	Country of origin	Source
Hollywood Censored	18 February	Foxtel Arts	United States	
Women He's Undressed	28 February	Showcase	United States	
Back on Board: Greg Louganis	6 March	Showcase	United States	
The Paedophile Hunters	23 March	CI	United Kingdom	
Only the Dead	3 April	Showcase	United States	
Steven Avery: Innocent or Guilty?	8 April	Discovery Channel	United States	
Springsteen & I	19 April	Max	United States	
In Their Own Words: Muhammad Ali	4 June	History	United States	

=== Specials ===
List of domestic television special premieres
Program	Original airdate(s)	Network(s)	Source
Australia Day 2016: Live at Sydney Opera House	26 January	Network Ten	
What Really Happens on the Gold Coast	26 January	Seven Network	
5th AACTA International Awards	31 January	Foxtel Arts	
An Audience with the Cast of Wentworth	3 May	SoHo	
The People's Forum with Malcolm Turnbull & Bill Shorten	13 May	Sky News	
Peter Garrett: A Version of Now – The Full Story	12 July	Max	
Home and Away: Revenge	19 December	Presto/Foxtel Play	
Home and Away: All or Nothing	Delayed to 26 January 2017	Presto/Foxtel Play	

List of international television special premieres
Program	Original airdate(s)	Network(s)	Country of origin	Source
LEGO Scooby-Doo: Knight Time Terror	26 January	Boomerang	United States	
Grease: Live	2 February	Nine Network	United States	
69th British Academy Film Awards	15 February	UKTV	United Kingdom	
58th Annual Grammy Awards	16 February	Fox8	United States	
Liza Minnelli Plays the AVO Session	19 February	Foxtel Arts	United States	
2016 Brit Awards	25 February	UKTV	United Kingdom	
Jethro Tull: Live AVO Session	27 February	Foxtel Arts	United States	
Nashville: On The Record 3	3 March	SoHo	United States	
2016 Kids' Choice Awards	13 March	Nickelodeon	United States	
The Passion	25 March	Foxtel Arts	United States	
Game of Thrones: The Story so Far	6 April	Showcase	United States	
2016 MTV Movie Awards	11 April	MTV	United States	
2016 Billboard Music Awards	23 May	V Hits	United States	
Sinatra 100: An All Star Grammy Concert	29 May	Foxtel Arts	United States	
Linguini Brothers Tarantella 2000	25 December	9Go!	Canada	
Kid Bass featuring Sincere Goodgirls Love Rudeboys	25 December	Nine Network	South Africa	

== Programming changes ==
=== Changes to network affiliation ===
Criterion for inclusion in the following list is that Australian premiere episodes will air in Australia for the first time on a new channel. This includes when a program is moved from a free-to-air network's primary channel to a digital multi-channel, as well as when a program moves between subscription television channels – provided the preceding criterion is met. Ended television series which change networks for repeat broadcasts are not included in the list.

List of domestic television series which changed network affiliation
Program	Date	New network	Previous network(s)	Source
Saturday Disney	19 March	7flix	7TWO	
The Bolt Report	25 April	Sky News	Network Ten	
Australian Survivor	21 August	Network Ten	Nine Network; Seven Network	
The Great Australian Spelling Bee	27 August	Eleven	Network Ten	

List of international television series which changed network affiliation
Program	Date	New network	Previous network	Country of origin	Source
American Idol	7 January	FOX8	Eleven	United States	
Pokémon	1 February	Boomerang	Cartoon Network	Japan	
Once Upon a Time	29 February	7flix	7TWO	United States	
The Muppets	1 March	7flix	Seven Network	United States	
The Mindy Project	2 March	7flix	Seven Network	United States	
The Amazing Race	3 March	7flix	Seven Network	United States	
Grey's Anatomy	21 March	7flix	Seven Network	United States	
How To Get Away With Murder	21 March	7flix	Seven Network	United States	
The Mindy Project	1 April	Presto	7flix	United States	
Sparkle Friends	30 April	9Go!	ABC3	New Zealand	
Pocket Protectors	30 April	7TWO	ABC3	New Zealand	
Sonic Boom	20 June	Boomerang	Cartoon Network	United States, France	

=== Free-to-air premieres ===
This is a list of programs which made their premiere on Australian free-to-air television that had previously premiered on Australian subscription television. Programs may still air on the original subscription television network.

List of international television series which premiered on free-to-air television for the first time
Program	Date	Free-to-air network	Subscription network(s)	Country of origin	Source
Ultimate Airport Dubai	5 February	Nine Network	National Geographic Channel	United Arab Emirates	
Cristela	6 February	Eleven	Fox8	United States	
Fresh Off the Boat	7 March	Eleven	Fox8	United States	
Scandal	21 March	7flix	Presto	United States	
PJ Masks	4 April	9Go!	Disney Junior	France	

=== Subscription premieres ===
This is a list of programs which made their debut on Australian subscription television, having previously premiered on Australian free-to-air television. Programs may still air (first or repeat) on the original free-to-air television network.

List of domestic television series which premiered on subscription television for the first time
Program	Date	Free-to-air network	Subscription network(s)	Source
Winter	31 May	Seven Network	13th Street	
Bringing Sexy Back	31 May	Seven Network	Style Network	

List of international television series which premiered on subscription television for the first time
Program	Date	Free-to-air network	Subscription network(s)	Country of origin	Source
The Blacklist	22 March	Seven Network	FX	United States	
The Mysteries of Laura	19 September	Nine Network	Universal Channel	United States	
Blindspot	18 October	Seven Network	Universal Channel	United States	

=== Returning programs ===
Australian produced programs which are returning with a new season after being absent from television from the previous calendar year.

List of returning domestic television series
Program	Return date	Network	Original run	Source
Australia's Got Talent	1 February	Nine Network	2007–2013; intermittently	
Saturday Live	30 April	Sky News Live	2013	
20 to 1	31 May	Nine Network	2005–2011	
Offspring	29 June	Network Ten	2010–2014	
Australian Survivor	21 August	Network Ten	2002–2006; intermittently	

=== Endings ===
List of domestic television series endings
Program	End date	Network	Start date	Ref
Reporting Live	21 April	Sky News Live	28 January 2016	
Richo	April	Sky News Live	23 February 2011	
Kiss Bang Love	5 July	Seven Network	24 May	
Saturday Disney	24 September	Seven Network; 7TWO; 7flix	27 January 1990	
Good Game	6 December	ABC2	19 September 2006	
SportsNight with James Bracey	16 December	Sky News Live	27 January 2013	

== See also ==
- 2016 in Australia
- List of Australian films of 2016
