= Briefcase (disambiguation) =

A briefcase is a case for carrying documents. The term may also refer to:

- In computing:
  - Briefcase (Microsoft Windows)
  - Yahoo! Briefcase, formerly a free file hosting service by Yahoo!
  - Briefcase, a virtual file system used in DOS Navigator orthodox file manager
- Briefcase, a term used in horse training to describe the act of getting the horse used to a bridle
- Nuclear briefcase, portable equipment to facilitate a leader of a nuclear weapons state ordering use of nuclear weapons, sometimes carried within a specialized briefcase
- The Briefcase, a CBS reality television series
- The Briefcase (Australia), a Channel Nine reality television series
