= EP Daily =

Canadian daily entertainment news television program

- Logo
- Genre: Video Games; Entertainment
- Created by: Victor Lucas
- Developed by: EP Media Ltd. (formerly Greedy Productions)
- Written by: Victor Lucas; Blake Siefken; Ryan Nicolas; Rob Koval; Jason Margolis; Geoff Chapman; Miri Jedeiken; Shaun Hatton; Marcus Onischak; Alistair Brown
- Directed by: Victor Lucas
- Presented by: Victor Lucas; Marissa Roberto; Scott C. Jones; Jose Sanchez; Miri Jedeikin; Shaun Hatton; Ben Silverman; Steve Tilley; Raju Mudhar; Ben Bolea
- Theme music composer: Paul Ruskay
- Composer: Audio Network (music)
- Country of origin: Canada
- Original language: English
- No. of seasons: 25

Production
- Executive producer: Victor Lucas
- Producers: Jason Margolis; Rob Koval
- Production locations: Vancouver, British Columbia; Toronto, Ontario; San Francisco, California; Los Angeles, California
- Cinematography: Richard Grundy
- Editor: Jordan Taylor (Lead)
- Production company: Greedy Productions Ltd.

Original release
- Network: G4 Canada; City; Syndication; Youtoo America
- Release: September 1, 1997 – 2015

Related
- Reviews on the Run; Greedy Docs

EP Daily (formerly The Electric Playground) is a daily news television show that covers video games, movies, TV shows, comic books, collectibles and gadgets. Created and executive produced by host Victor Lucas, and his Vancouver, British Columbia production company EP Media Ltd (formerly Greedy Productions Ltd), EP Daily was a staple on airwaves since its debut in September 1997. The show continues to produce and publish content on the Electric Playground Network's YouTube channel.

== Synopsis ==
The show featured previews of upcoming video games, video game industry news, and interviews with celebrity gamers and people in the video game industry; as well as segments that look at the latest toys, games, comics, and gadgets. EP's hosts travel the world bringing viewers behind the scenes of the global game business to meet the planet's most respected video game creators. The show featured daily coverage from Vancouver, Toronto, San Francisco and Los Angeles.

== Cast/hosts ==
Current cast and correspondents include: Victor Lucas, guest correspondent Johnny Millenium of Happy Console Gamer

Former cast, crew and correspondents have included: Tommy Tallarico, Julie Stoffer, Jade Raymond, Geoff Keighley, Jose "Fubar" Sanchez, Ben Silverman, Steve Tilley, Donna Mei-Ling Park, Kelly Benson, Briana McIvor, Shaun Hatton, Miri Jedeikin, Scott C. Jones, Marissa Roberto, Raju Mudhar, Zoe Flower and Evangeline Lilly.

The Electric Playground began its life as online news magazine founded by Victor Lucas, John Shaw and Torben Rolfsen before it was brought to television when the team was joined by Scott Barrett in 1997 – who remained with the show to direct the first two seasons. At the end of the second season, Scott accepted an offer to join Shiny Entertainment, so Victor took on triple duty as the show's producer, director and host.

== History ==
EP Daily aired on G4 Canada and City. The show had previously been aired in Canada on Space, Razer, A Channel, and OMNI.1, and in the United States on the Science Channel and G4.

The Electric Playground began as a website (elecplay.com) in 1995. In September 1997 the show premiered in Canada and along the US west coast in a 30-minute weekly format.

In 2002, the reviews segment of the show, "Reviews on the Run", was spun off into its own show. It was known as Judgment Day in the United States and Reviews on the Run in Canada. The final airing of Judgment Day on G4 was in December 2005. In 2010 "Reviews on the Run" was expanded out to a daily format. The show's website was reviewsontherun.com. Reviews on the Run ended in 2014 after 13 seasons.

On December 31, 2006, Lucas announced on the EP Daily forums that Greedy Productions had cancelled its contract with CHUM television, which had broadcast Electric Playground and Reviews on the Run on SPACE and A-Channel, and signed a two-year exclusive deal with Rogers Communications, to broadcast the shows on G4 Canada and then additionally on other Rogers owned TV stations. The Electric Playground aired only once on OMNI.1, on September 3, 2007.

On December 15, 2007, the series premiered on City Toronto and City Vancouver, airing episodes that had aired on G4 Canada.

In August 2008, EP Daily premiered in a daily format. The Electric Playground remained weekly, wrapping up the week in video games, technology, and entertainment.

Beginning on December 1, 2010, EP Daily airs every weeknight at 8pm on SCI FI Channel Australia. This ceased on December 31, 2013, when SFTV Australia was closed after the owners of the channel failed to reach an agreement with Foxtel, and has now been replaced by NBC Universal's Syfy Australia

In September 2010, the show returned to America on ABC stations in select cities in the United States. It featured two specials that aired on Sunday, January 16, 2011: "Everythings Cool Awards" and "Cool Things For 2011". Weekly episodes began airing in September 2011. Each episode is an hour split into two parts, either airing back to back or at separate times, depending on the station that's airing the show. Daily episodes began airing on select stations on September 3, 2012. As of January 2015, none of the USA broadcasters including Reelz and Youtoo channels were continuing to broadcast EP Daily in the US markets. Some of the American stations replaced EP Daily with televised versions of Q starting in September 2014.

The show was known as The Electric Playground until July 2012, at which point the name was changed to EP Daily.

Late in 2014, Shaun Hatton left the series and Reelz has decided not to renew the series on the network. The show went on hiatus in 2015.

As of 2016, EP Daily no longer airs on G4 and City. The show continues to produce content, such as daily Rundown segments and interviews, on the Electric Playground Network's YouTube channel. Since then, Victor Lucas has been looking for new partners to support the show.

== International broadcasters ==
Country	Network(s)	Notes	Ref.
United States	Discovery Science Channel (2001–2002), G4 (2002–2006), Syndication (2010–2014), Youtoo TV (2012–Jan 2015), Reelz (2013–Jan 2015)	Started airing weekly episodes in September 2011, the daily version was made available in select markets on September 3, 2012. Began airing in April 2013 on Reelz.	
Australia	SF Channel (relaunched as Syfy on January 1, 2014)	Unknown if EP Daily will be shown in Australia at all in 2014	
Canada	G4, City, Space (TV channel), Razer, A-Channel, OMNI 1	Aired only once on OMNI.1	
