= How'd You Get So Rich? =

- Genre: Reality
- Created by: Mark Burnett; Barry Poznick; John Stevens
- Presented by: Joan Rivers
- Opening theme: "Make That Money" performed by Lisa Bello
- Composer: Bump Music
- Country of origin: United States
- Original language: English
- No. of seasons: 2
- No. of episodes: 12

Production
- Executive producers: Mark Burnett; Sal Maniaci; Barry Poznick; Amy Rosenblum; John Stevens
- Producers: Edie Neuberger; Michael Newborn; Christine Owen; Danielle Pisano
- Editors: Nick Don Vito; Terri Maloney; Rich Remis; Nick Staller; Jason Stewart
- Running time: 22 minutes
- Production companies: Mark Burnett Productions; Zoo Productions

Original release
- Network: TV Land
- Release: August 9, 2009 – June 2, 2010

How'd You Get So Rich? is an American reality television series hosted by comedian Joan Rivers. The series premiered on TV Land on August 5, 2009, and consisted of six weekly half-hour episodes. How'd You Get So Rich? was created and executive produced by Mark Burnett (Survivor, The Apprentice).

The show returned to TV Land for a second and final season on May 5, 2010.

== Synopsis ==
The series featured Joan Rivers traveling around the United States interviewing self-made millionaires and billionaires. These are what Joan calls "Rag-To-Riches" stories. These self-made millionaires and billionaire started with little-to-nothing, and made their way up in society.

== Episodes ==
=== Season 1 ===
- 101 - Segment 1: Rivers meets the inventor of the five-chamber bubble blower, who is so rich his dog has a walk-in closet and a private chef. Segment 2: Meet a millionaire who had nothing growing up. 'Original airdate August 26, 2009'
- 102 - Segment 1: Rivers interviews a man who made his way through Harvard by scrubbing toilets. Segment 2: Rivers visits an ultramodern house in Beverly Hills, owned by someone who used to fold sweaters at the mall. 'Original airdate: August 5, 2009'
- 103 - Segment 1: Rivers meets a man who started off penniless and built an empire around Mardi Gras floats and plastic beads. Segment 2: Joan tours the former Versace Mansion in South Beach, Florida which is now owned by a college dropout. 'Original airdate August 12, 2009'
- 104 - Segment 1: Rivers meets the man who makes billions of dollars from infomercials. Segment 2: Meet the middle-aged woman who went on to make millions after divorcing her rich husband. 'Original airdate August 19, 2009'
- 105 - Segment 1: The story of a Croatian immigrant who grew up with dirt floors and no running water – but now he has a ballroom and an indoor swimming pool. Segment 2: Meet an ad exec who switched careers at age 40 and lives in a castle with a multimillion-dollar art collection. 'Original airdate September 9, 2009'
- 106 - Meet someone who spends $1 million on clothes in a year. Segment 2: Rivers meets a man who made his fortune on Butt Paste. Segment 2: Meet the show's youngest millionaire who invented the Slanket.

=== Season 2 ===
- 201 - The second season begins with profiles of Donald Trump and the formerly homeless John Paul DeJoria, who co-founded Paul Mitchell hair care and Patrón tequila.
- 202 - Segment 1: Rivers profiles a high-school dropout who invented the wee wee pad for housebreaking puppies. Segment 2: A tour of Joan Rivers' Connecticut estate.
- 203 - The show interviews five multi-millionaires.
- 204 - Segment 1: The show profiles a Georgia millionaire who didn't have running water growing up. Segment 2: A profile of a schoolteacher who became a millionaire making custom cakes.
- 205 - Segment 1: The show profiles a man who pioneered self-service gas stations to become a billionaire. Segment 2: The founder of Hawaiian Tropic suntan lotion who sold his company for $160 million.
- 206 - Segment 1: A tour of the estate of a pharmacy tycoon. Segment 2: A tour of the mansion belonging to the creator of Mrs Fields cookies.

== Broadcast ==
Internationally, the series premiered in Australia on Style Network on December 10, 2015.

== British version ==
A British version of the show was broadcast by Channel 4, presented by Katherine Ryan.
