= British (Australian TV channel) =

- Country: Australia

Programming
- Language: English
- Picture format: 576i (SDTV 16:9); 1080i (HDTV 16:9)
- Timeshift service: British + 2

Ownership
- Owner: Foxtel Networks
- Sister channels: Foxtel Networks channels

History
- Launched: 17 December 2019
- Former names: FOX Sleuth (2019–2023); Sleuth (2023–24)

Availability

Streaming media
- Foxtel Go: Channel 118
- Binge: binge.com.au

British (formerly Sleuth and Fox Sleuth) is an Australian subscription television channel which focuses on airing crime TV series. The channel launched on 17 December 2019, replacing the Australian feed of 13th Street.

On 26 September 2023, the channel rebranded as Sleuth.

On 1 August 2024, the channel once again rebranded as British.

== Programming ==
=== Current programming ===
- Agatha Christie's Marple
- The Brokenwood Mysteries
- London Kills
- The Madame Blanc Mysteries
- Miss Scarlet and The Duke
- Vera
- Whitstable Pearl

=== Former programming ===
- 1600 Penn
- Agatha Christie’s Poirot
- 'Allo 'Allo! (Moved back to Fox8)
- Ben and Kate
- Blue Murder
- Caroline in the City
- Columbo
- Dads
- Death Valley
- Don't Trust the B— in Apartment 23
- Drunk History
- Endeavour
- Frankie Drake Mysteries
- Glee
- Heartbeat
- Hope & Faith
- Inspector George Gently
- The Inspector Lynley Mysteries
- Inspector Morse
- Jonathan Creek
- Kyle XY
- Line of Duty
- Magnum, P.I.
- Murder, She Wrote
- Murdoch Mysteries
- Prime Suspect
- Rosemary & Thyme
- Scott & Bailey
- Shameless
- Silent Witness
- A Touch of Frost
- Waking the Dead
- Wire in the Blood
- The Wire (Moved from Fox8/Fox Arena)

== Logo history ==
17 December 2019 - 26 September 2023

26 September 2023 – 31 July 2024
