= April Byron =

Australian musical artist (1947–2019)

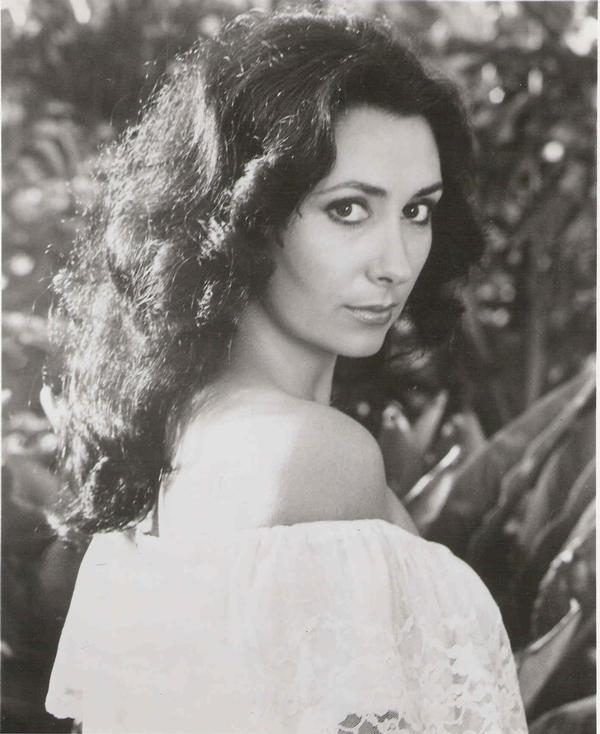
- April Byron 1982

Background information
- Born: April Elizabeth Dove Potts; 22 March 1947; Warburton, Victoria, Australia
- Died: 10 July 2019 (aged 72)
- Genres: Rock, pop
- Occupations: Singer, songwriter
- Instruments: Vocals, keyboard
- Years active: 1960–2019
- Labels: Festival, Leedon, CBS/ARC, Down Under Label
- Website: www.aprilbyron.com

April Elizabeth Dove Potts (22 March 1947 – 10 July 2019), known professionally as April Byron, was an Australian pop singer and songwriter. She was the first female artist to collaborate with the Bee Gees after their formation as a band, on the 1966 single "He's a Thief" / "A Long Time Ago".

== Early life and career ==
Byron was born in Warburton, Victoria and attended St. Peters Collegiate Girls School in Adelaide, South Australia. Her early business managers were Ron Tremaine and his wife Patricia Tremaine, a former Miss South Australia in 1959. Byron relocated to Melbourne in 1963 to play the Ivan Dayman dance circuit, including Festival Hall and the Palais St. Kilda, alongside other Australian teenage pop singers including Normie Rowe, Olivia Newton-John and Bobby and Laurie. Due to a resemblance to Elizabeth Taylor, Byron was sometimes referred to as 'Australia's Liz Taylor'.

Byron's first recording on Festival's Leedon Label, 'Make the World Go Away', won the 3UZ (Melbourne) Golden Sound Award 1963–64 for best-produced song in Australia. She was also awarded the 5KA (Adelaide) Best Female Artist Award 1964–65. During this time, her image appeared under Coca-Cola bottle caps in Australia.

== Australian music career ==
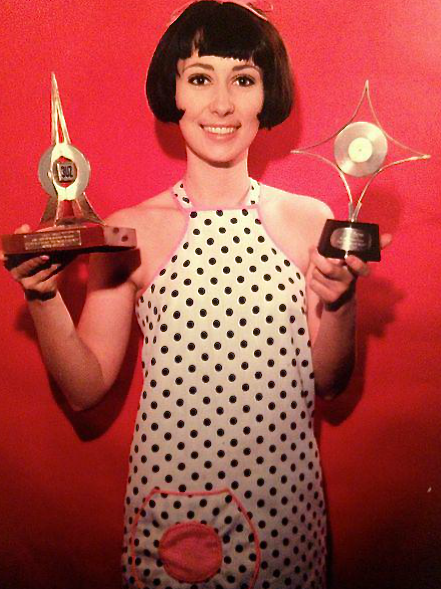

In 1964, a profile of Byron in Everybody's Magazine was entitled "Oh, to be in Melbourne, Now that April's There", mentioning her Golden Sound Award and focusing the Australian pop industry on Melbourne. Through her award, plus a stint as resident female star on the first season of The Go!! Show, Byron became a part of the second wave of pop/rock in Australia, which began in Melbourne at that time and produced the next Australian 'King of pop', Normie Rowe.

Byron was described as "second only to The Beatles", when her cover of "Make the World Go Away" stayed near the top of the charts for many weeks in several states, while the Beatles occupied the top four or five spots. Her manager at this time was Horrie Dargie, head of DYT Productions, which produced The Go!! Show. After the first season of the show, she was released by DYT Productions due to being 16 years old, pregnant, and unmarried. Her pregnancy was kept secret and termed as a "mystery illness" in the contemporary music columns. According to Australian music historian Bill Casey, the pregnancy derailed her pop career, which "never really regained momentum."

Byron moved to Sydney, where she and her family were supported by promoter Ivan Dayman, and later the Jacobsen Agency. After her daughter Cinderella was born, Byron joined Johnny O'Keefe, Dinah Lee, and Max Merritt and the Meteors on the Johnny O'Keefe/Jacobsen Agency train tour of New South Wales and Queensland.

In Sydney, Byron performed at the RSL and Leagues clubs, the Motor Club and other major venues, appeared on television shows including the Don Lane Show, Studio A, Paul Hogan Show, and others, and performed with Helen Reddy, Dudley Moore, Peter Allen, John Rowles, and Rick Springfield, also touring with the Mills Brothers. It was while in Sydney that she first collaborated with the Bee Gees, Nat Kipner, and Ossie Byrne at the St. Clair Studio, Hurstville. In 1969, she toured New South Wales and Queensland with Johnny Farnham and later played venues in Brisbane and the Gold Coast with The Masters Apprentices. Her second daughter, Candy, was born in October 1969.

During the 1970s Byron was awarded Queensland Entertainer of the Year 1974–75. In 1977, she joined Johnny O'Keefe and the cast of "The Return of J.O.K and the Good Ol' Days of Rock n' Roll" at the St. George's Leagues Club.

== Work with the Bee Gees ==
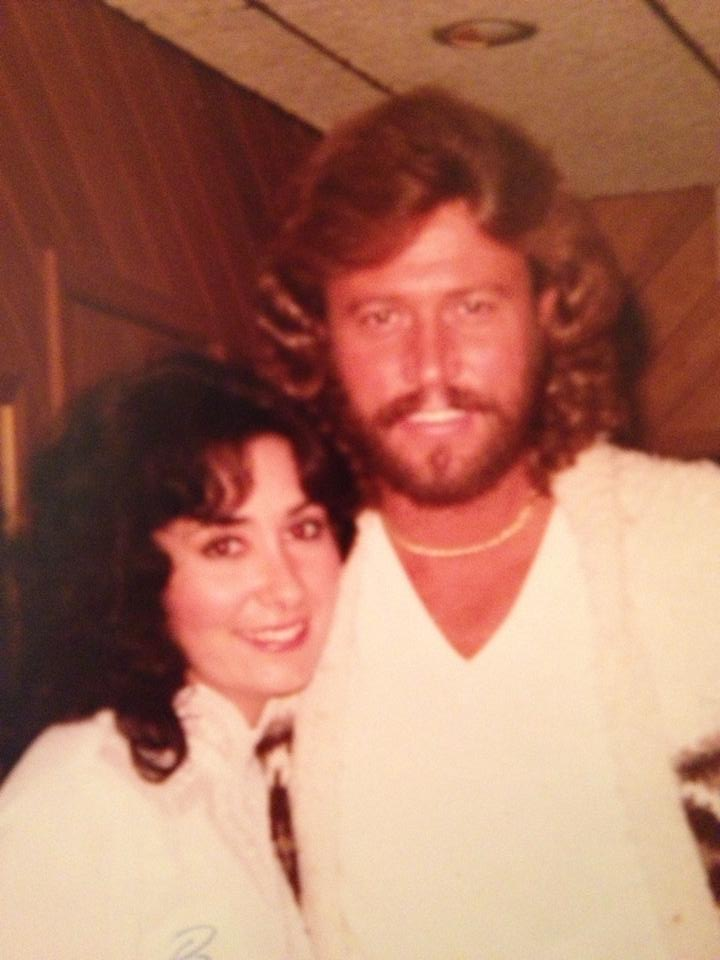
April Byron and Barry Gibb

In 1965–66, when Byron was the current recipient of the 5KA Best Female Artist Award and Barry Gibb was the current 5KA Songwriter of the Year Award recipient (his first songwriting award), Byron collaborated on a single with the Bee Gees, then also in their teens. The single, "A Long Time Ago" / "He's a Thief", began the Gibb Brothers' succession of collaborations with female singers, which later included Samantha Sang, Barbra Streisand, Dionne Warwick, Dolly Parton, and Celine Dion.

In 1982, she again collaborated with the Bee Gees at their Middle Ear Studio in Miami Beach, Florida. Byron was given songs by the Bee Gees ("Falling in Love With You" and "Don't Forget to Remember Me") which she recorded in Music City, Nashville, Tennessee, but were never released.

== Personal life ==
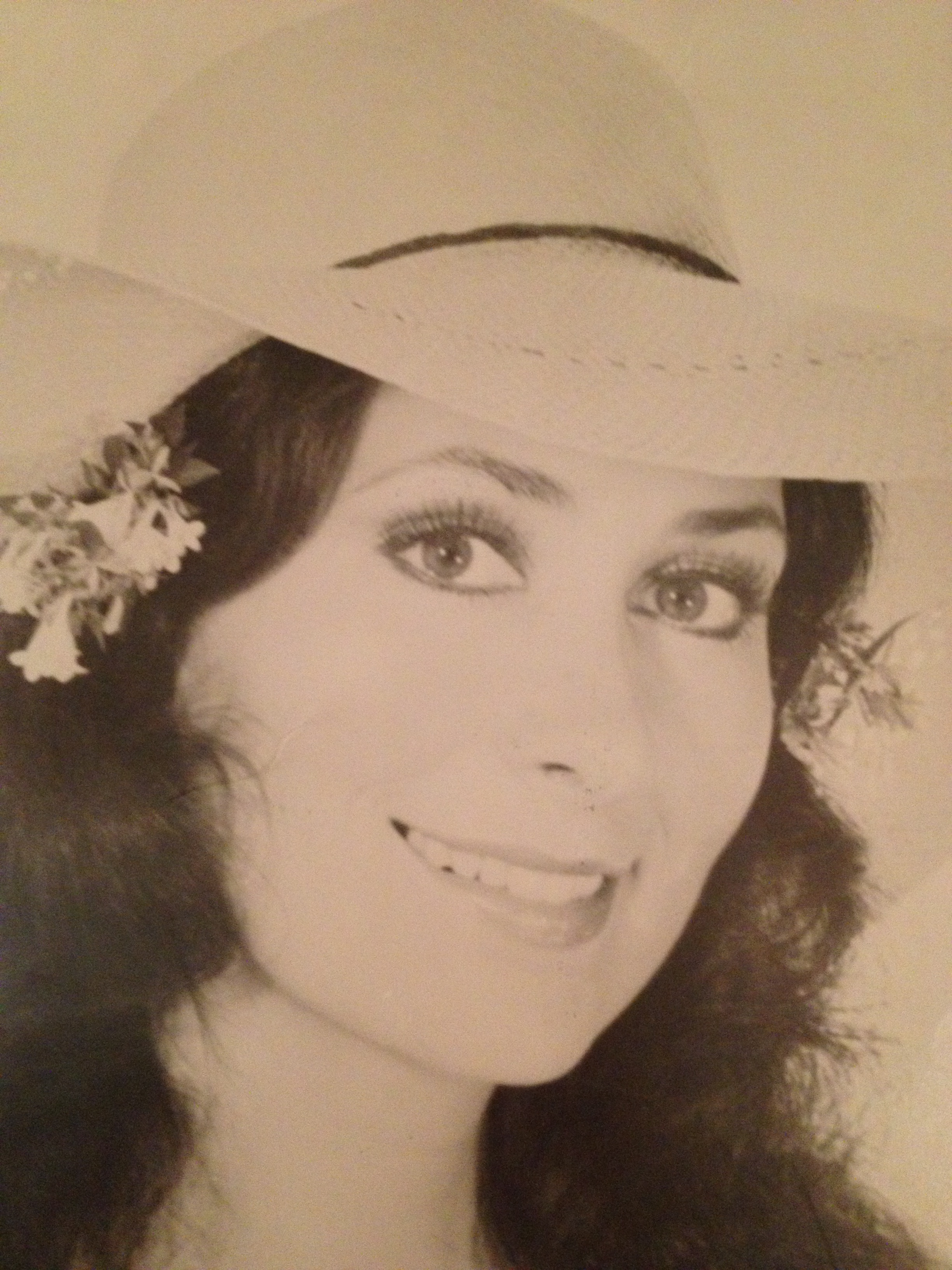
April Byron, 1978.

Byron had two daughters, Cinderella Abrams (née Potts) and Candy Potts, and four grandchildren. Her first daughter Cinderella (stage name Cindy Byron), aged 9, began appearing on the 1970s Australian nationwide children's television series Happy Go 'Round (QTQ-9 Brisbane, Queensland). Her second daughter Candy appeared in 13 episodes of VH1's reality show Saddle Ranch in 2011–12.

Byron left Australia with her family in 1978 to pursue a film career in the United States. She settled in Beverly Hills, California, managing the entertainment careers of her daughter Candy and granddaughters Ashenputtel, Melanie, and Emmalee. She died on 10 July 2019.

== Discography ==
- "Make the World Go Away" / "He's My Bobby" – 1964
- "What's A Girl to Do" / "Listen Closely" – 1965
- "He's a Thief" / "A Long Time Ago" – 1966
- "See You Sam" / "You Go Ahead Baby" – 1967
