= SF (Australian TV channel) =

- Country: Australia

Programming
- Language: English
- Picture format: 576i (SDTV 16:9)

Ownership
- Owner: Sony Pictures Television; NBCUniversal; CBS Studios International
- Parent: TV1 General Entertainment Partnership
- Sister channels: TV1; E! Style Network; 13th Street; Nickelodeon

History
- Launched: 1 December 2006; 23 July 2012 (relaunch; as SF)
- Closed: 31 December 2013
- Replaced by: Syfy
- Former names: Sci Fi Channel (2006–2012)

SF (formerly Sci Fi Channel) was an Australian subscription channel that aired science fiction, fantasy and related programs. It was available on Foxtel, Austar and Optus Television subscription platforms.

In 2012, the channel rebranded from Sci Fi to SF. The channel used a world-exclusive version of the "Syfy" branding, SF being a joint venture between NBCUniversal (the owners of the Syfy brand), Sony Pictures Television and CBS Studios International.

On 31 December 2013, SF ceased broadcasting and closed, being replaced by an Australian version of Syfy in 2014.

== Programming ==
SF aired re-runs such as: Doctor Who, Star Trek, Medium, Buffy the Vampire Slayer, and Charmed. It has also had the first Australian run of shows such as Defiance, Lost Girl, Continuum, Eureka, Alphas, and Ghost Hunters International.

== History ==
Sci Fi went live at 6 am on 1 December 2006. SF originally used the same branding and packaging as the United States Sci Fi channel of the same name but had its own schedule and programming. It aired popular shows such as Doctor Who, The X-Files, Buffy, Charmed, the original and reimagined Battlestar Galactica series, Medium, and the Star Trek and Stargate franchises.

Sci Fi switched broadcasting from 4:3 to 16:9 aspect ratio on 1 December 2008. Sci Fi +2 went to air on 15 November 2009.

On 18 July 2012, it was announced that as of 23 July 2012 Sci Fi would be rebranded as SF, using a world exclusive branding

On 16 August 2013, it was announced that SF's carriage agreement with Foxtel was set to expire in December 2013, and that negotiations had failed to create a new carriage deal. With Foxtel being the sole subscription TV provider in Australia, this meant that it was expected that SF, and its sister channel TV1, would close. Foxtel announced that a science-fiction dedicated channel would replace SF and would continue to offer the main content currently on offer. SF later announced they were exploring options in which they could continue operations, such as launching their service on IPTV, Crackle, or Apple TV services. On 30 September 2013, it was announced that Syfy (Australia) (a NBCUniversal wholly owned and operated channel) would replace SF on Foxtel as of 1 January 2014. Ultimately, SF closed at midnight on 31 December 2013.

== Press coverage ==
On 22 November 2006, the Adelaide Advertiser reported about the demand for a science-fiction–themed TV channel in Australia.

The official launch party of the Sci Fi Channel was held on 16 November 2006 at the Australian Museum in Sydney. Guests included Jacqueline McKenzie (from The 4400), Gigi Edgley and Matthew Newton (from Farscape).

== Media ==
In addition to subscription television, SF Channel Australia also operated on the now defunct SF Australia website, where viewers could access television guides as well as video extras, full episodes, and the SF News blog. In 2013, they began producing their own web only pop culture news series Go Pop.

== See also ==
- TV1
- Syfy Universal
- Syfy (Australia)
