= Sci-Fi (Australian TV channel) =

- Country: Australia

Programming
- Language: English
- Picture format: 576i (SDTV 16:9); 1080i (HDTV 16:9)
- Timeshift service: Sci-Fi + 2

Ownership
- Owner: Foxtel Networks
- Sister channels: Foxtel Networks channels

History
- Launched: 17 December 2019 (On Foxtel); 31 December 2019
- Replaced: Syfy
- Closed: 29 February 2024
- Former names: FOX Sci-Fi (2019–2023)

Availability

Streaming media
- Foxtel Go: Channel 116

Sci-Fi (formerly Fox Sci-Fi) was an Australian subscription television channel which focused on airing fantasy TV series. The channel launched on 17 December on Foxtel and 31 December 2019, replacing the Australian feed of Syfy after NBCUniversal International Networks decided to re-evaluate and change its network strategy in the domestic market, along with a channel shuffle for Foxtel itself.

On 26 September 2023, the channel rebranded simply as Sci-Fi.

On 29 February 2024, the channel closed along with Foxtel Movies Thriller.
