= Yahoo Briefcase =

File hosting service by Yahoo! (1999–2009)

Yahoo! Briefcase
- Website type: File storage and sharing
- Owner: Yahoo!
- Website: http://briefcase.yahoo.com
- Commercial: Yes
- Current status: Closed

Yahoo! Briefcase was an online file storage service offer by Yahoo!, providing 30MB of online storage of files, including photo files, etc. up to 5MB. In 2001 up to 50 megs of photo storage/sharing alone was offered—this was in addition to the just "files" facility that remained available in its final years after photos moved to Flickr.

The Briefcase service started in August 1999 and was shut down on March 30, 2009.
