= The Briefcase =

- Genre: Reality
- Country of origin: United States
- Original language: English
- No. of seasons: 1
- No. of episodes: 6

Production
- Executive producers: Dave Broome; Faye Stapleton
- Running time: 44 minutes
- Production companies: 25-7 Productions; Sony Pictures Television

Original release
- Network: CBS
- Release: May 27 – June 26, 2015

The Briefcase is an American reality television program created by Dave Broome that premiered on CBS on May 27, 2015. In each episode, two American families undergoing financial hardship are each given a briefcase containing $101,000, and must decide whether to keep all the money for themselves or give some or all of it to the other family. Over the course of 72 hours, each family learns about the other and makes the decision, without knowing that the other family has been given a briefcase as well, with the same instructions. On December 9, 2015, the show was cancelled.

Reception of The Briefcase has been largely negative. Ken Tucker, critic-at-large of Yahoo! TV, described it as "cynical and repulsive" for "passing off its exploitation...as uplifting, inspirational TV." Jason Miller of Time.com called it "the worst reality TV show ever". Others compared the show to fictional film and television that pitted the needy against each other, such as the Twilight Zone episode "Button, Button", or The Hunger Games.

Executive producer David Broome responded that critics were misrepresenting the show. "Some of the reports are factually incorrect to the point of irresponsible journalism," he said.

== Episodes ==
No.	Title	Original release date	U.S. viewers (millions)
1	"Bronsons/Bergins"	May 27, 2015	6.87
Bronsons gave away $100,000 and Bergins gave away $100,000.
2	"Scotts/Musolinos"	June 3, 2015	5.46
Scotts gave away $20,000 and Musolinos gave away $40,000.
3	"Wylie/Bailey-Stewart"	June 10, 2015	4.88
Wylie gave away $25,000 and Bailey-Stewart gave away $99,600.
4	"Matas/Melansons"	June 17, 2015	5.21
Matas gave away $50,000 and Melansons gave away $100,000.
5	"Owens/Aponte-Kassimatis"	June 24, 2015	4.66
Owens gave away $11,000 with 3 conditions and Aponte-Kassimatis gave away $20,000.
6	"Moyas/Vendely-Salgados"	June 26, 2015	4.00
Moyas gave away $10,000 and Vendely-Salgados gave away $15,000.

== Ratings ==
No.	Title	Air date	Rating/share (18–49)	Viewers (millions)	DVR (18–49)	DVR viewers (millions)	Total (18–49)	Total viewers (millions)
1	"Bronsons/Bergins"	May 27, 2015	1.4/5	6.87	0.1	0.43	1.5	7.30
2	"Scotts/Musolinos"	June 3, 2015	0.9/4	5.46	0.2	0.53	1.1	5.99
3	"Wylie/Bailey-Stewart"	June 10, 2015	1.0/4	4.88	—N/a	0.43	—N/a	5.31
4	"Matas/Melansons"	June 17, 2015	0.9/3	5.21	0.1	0.40	1.0	5.58
5	"Owens/Aponte-Kassimatis"	June 24, 2015	0.9/3	4.66	0.2	0.60	1.1	5.26
6	"Moyas/Vendely-Salgados"	June 26, 2015	0.7/3	4.00	—N/a	—N/a	—N/a	—N/a

== International version ==
An Australian version of the show aired on the Nine Network from June 20 until August 9, 2016. Much like the American program, it was met with negative reviews and low ratings.
