= Kiss Bang Love =

- Genre: Reality Series
- Created by: Snowman Productions
- Narrated by: Sancia Robinson
- Country of origin: Australia
- Original language: English
- No. of series: 1
- No. of episodes: 6

Original release
- Network: Seven Network
- Release: 24 May – 5 July 2016

Kiss Bang Love is an Australian reality dating television series on the Seven Network which premiered on 24 May 2016 at 8:45pm. The series is produced by the makers of Married at First Sight and based on a Danish format of the same name.

The series debuted to low ratings, coming fourth in its timeslot and the viewership continued to fall lower throughout the series, described as a "ratings flop". Shortly after the final episode aired, the Seven Network confirmed the program would not be renewed. Repeats aired on Sunday afternoons on 7flix in December 2020.

== Premise ==
Six singles are matched with 12 potential partners. Most are strangers but some are acquaintances or former lovers. The couples skip awkward dates and instead try to kiss each other before deciding whom to take on a romantic weekend holiday.

== Episodes ==
No.	Title	Original release date	UK viewers (millions)
1	Episode One	24 May 2016	0.513
2	Episode Two	31 May 2016	0.449
3	Episode Three	7 June 2016	0.383
4	Episode Four	14 June 2016	0.194
5	Episode Five	21 June 2016	0.137
6	Episode Six	5 July 2016	0.248

== International adaptations ==
In July 2016, American channel fyi commissioned 10 episodes of the series. The series debuted on 3 January 2017 rating 167,000 viewers. In Germany premiered on ProSieben.
