= Bringing Sexy Back =

- Genre: Reality television
- Presented by: Samantha Armytage
- Country of origin: Australia
- Original language: English
- No. of seasons: 1
- No. of episodes: 8

Production
- Running time: 60 minutes per episode (inc. commercials)

Original release
- Network: Seven Network
- Release: 12 August 2014 – 13 January 2015

Bringing Sexy Back is an Australian weight loss reality television show that aired on the Seven Network on Tuesday nights at 7:30pm.

== Show details ==
Hosted by Sunrise presenter Samantha Armytage, each week the show features a transformation involving one everyday Australian hoping to get his or her lifestyle back by improving his or her self-image.

The show premiered on Tuesday, 12 August 2014 at 7:30pm, but could only manage a national audience of 654,000, placing it third in its timeslot. Following the suicide of actor Robin Williams earlier that day, Network Ten hastily scheduled the film Mrs. Doubtfire in the same timeslot.

On 17 September, the Seven Network removed the show from its schedule due to its continuing low ratings to make way for a new season of Dancing with the Stars. With only two episodes remaining, they were eventually aired on 6 and 13 January 2015.

The program was syndicated to Foxtel channel Style Network in May 2016.
