= Life on Marbs =

Television series

- Genre: Reality television
- Opening theme: Life on Marbs theme
- Country of origin: United Kingdom
- Original language: English
- No. of series: 1
- No. of episodes: 12

Production
- Executive producer: Luke McFarlane Derek McLean
- Production locations: Marbella, Spain
- Camera setup: Multi Camera
- Running time: 45 mins
- Production company: Lime Pictures

Original release
- Network: ITVBe
- Release: 22 July – 7 October 2015

Related
- The Only Way is Essex

Life on Marbs is a British semi-reality television series set in Marbella, Spain. The series follows the lives of the people who work and live in Marbs.

It is broadcast on ITVBe on 22 July 2015. Former The Only Way is Essex stars Ferne McCann and Elliot Wright have briefly appeared in the series

In March 2016, OK! Magazine exclusively revealed that they will not be coming back for a second series.

On 29 September 2016, Natalie appeared in the Channel 5 documentary Celebrity Botched Up Bodies to fix a previous nose job that went wrong.

== Cast members ==
Main Cast member	Age	Occupation
Adam Graham	25	Property manager, waiter and older brother of Jeff
Alex Weaver	19	editor for Marbella Rocks magazine
Amy Carter	24	Co-owner of Golden Tarts Beauty Salon
Bally Singh	39	Owner of The Rich List group
Cassie Rowan	28	Housewife and part-time beautician
Danni Levy	31	Fitness trainer and journalist
Felicity Faye Kidd	28	Owner of Marbella Dress Company
Jeff Graham	23	Businessman and younger brother of Adam
Jon Stretton Knowles	34	Entrepreneur
Jordan Sargeant	23	Head of Sales at Marbella Rocks magazine
Josh Ortega	21	PR for Ultimate Promotions Marbella and Briefly dated Jordan
Joss Mooney	27	Fitness trainer and model. Before Life on Marbs, Mooney was a cast member of the first series of Ex on the Beach
Lauren Vyner	22	Works at the Golden Tarts Beauty Salon
Linda Hodgkins	54	Runs Linekars Group. She is known as Mummy of Marbella, good friends with Suzy and appeared in Elliott Wright Playa in Marbella
Lola Zambrana	21	Occupation: Interior Designer, model, concierge and previously dated Adam
Mark Forster	33	Owns a vehicle rental business
Maxwell Jameson	18	Head booker at Target Models Marbella
Natalie Richardson	32	Housewife and former model
Sarah Carter	38	Fellow co-owner of Golden Tarts Beauty Salon
Suzy White	34	Aspiring singer. Good friends with Linda and appeared in Elliott Wright Playa in Marbella
