= Mac Cocker =

British-Australian radio presenter

George Malcolm Cocker (1941 – 3 June 2016) better known as Mac Cocker, was an English-born Australian radio announcer. He also worked as a DJ, musician, and actor. Cocker worked for the Australian Broadcasting Corporation radio network for 33 years, with stints on Radio Australia, Double J, Radio National, and 105.7 ABC Darwin. He is the father of Jarvis Cocker, lead singer of the English rock band Pulp.

== Early life ==
George Malcolm Cocker was born in Sheffield, England, in 1941.

== Radio career ==
In 1974, Cocker was recruited by the Australian Broadcasting Commission (ABC) to work for Radio Australia on special projects in Melbourne. In March 1975, he was one of the early staff of 2JJ or Double J, a new radio station established by the ABC. Cocker remained at 2JJ, which later became 2JJJ and then Triple J, until 1985 when he left to spend five years travelling around the world.

In 1984, he made two minor appearances in television series, one in the cricket miniseries Bodyline, and one playing himself as a 2JJ DJ in the drama series Sweet and Sour about a band trying to make it in the Sydney music scene. For many years, Cocker fostered the rumour that he was related to the singer Joe Cocker, who had the same surname and was also from Sheffield, although they were not actually related. Friend and 2JJ colleague Mark Colvin would later recall that Mac produced a radio documentary as he travelled with Joe Cocker's touring entourage entitled "I'm a Cocker, Too".

In 1990, Cocker returned to Australia, and moved to Darwin in the Northern Territory. He resumed his career with ABC Radio, joining 105.7 ABC Darwin where he worked each of the regular shifts at some time, as well as presenting the specialist programs The Night Train, The Globetrotter and Louvred Lounge, as well as a weekly Vinyl Museum program for Radio National in the early 1990s. He retired from the ABC in 2007 after a 33-year career.

== Personal life and death ==
Cocker married art student Christine Connolly and they had a son, Jarvis, and a daughter, Saskia. In 1970, Cocker walked out on the family, who woke up one morning to find a note that he had left them. He moved to Sydney, Australia.

In 1998, Jarvis and Saskia flew to Australia to meet and reconcile with their estranged father. In 2006, Jarvis maintained that he had forgiven him although they did not stay in contact, saying "I don't feel any bitterness towards him at all. I feel sorry for him."

Cocker died in Darwin on 3 June 2016 after a long illness.
