= Christine Jackson (cellist) =

British-born Australian cellist

- Born: Christine Gillian Jackson; 1962; London, England, UK
- Died: 24 January 2016 (aged 53) Cairns, Queensland, Australia
- Occupation: Cellist
- Instrument: Cello

Christine Gillian Jackson (1962 – 24 January 2016) was a British-born Australian cellist.

Jackson was born in London, and trained at the Guildhall School of Music and Drama. During her classical career, she played as a cellist for the Royal Philharmonic Orchestra, The Hallé, and the Royal Liverpool Philharmonic. She also worked in the pop music area, as a session cellist for artists such as Peter Gabriel, The Beach Boys, Shirley Bassey, Kylie Minogue and Jason Donovan.

Jackson moved to Sydney, Australia to join the Australian Chamber Orchestra. After her stint with the ACO, she remained in Australia, relocating to Cairns, Queensland, where she was known as the "Barefoot Cellist". She worked with Aboriginal musician David Hudson on music for cello and didgeridoo, a combination which she said worked "really well".

In 2009, Jackson had a brain aneurysm which left her paralysed on one side. She died on 24 January 2016, aged 53, following complications from that event.
