= Race for the White House =

- Genre: Documentary
- Country of origin: United States
- No. of seasons: 2
- No. of episodes: 12

Production
- Executive producers: Kevin Spacey; Dana Brunetti
- Running time: 60 minutes

Original release
- Network: CNN
- Release: March 6, 2016 – September 20, 2020

Race for the White House is an American political television show that discusses various US presidential election campaigns throughout United States history. It premiered on March 6, 2016, on CNN. The series is narrated by Kevin Spacey, well known at the time of production for playing fictional President Frank Underwood in the American version of House of Cards. After Spacey faced allegations of child sexual abuse, the narration was re-recorded by Spacey's House of Cards co-star Mahershala Ali. Netflix Canada still streamed the original version with Kevin Spacey's audio narration until September 1, 2020, when the show was removed in Canada.

On January 9, 2020, it was announced that the second season would premiere on February 16, 2020.

== Episodes ==
Season	Episodes	Originally released	
Season	Episodes	First released	Last released
1	6	March 6, 2016	April 10, 2016
2	6	February 16, 2020	December 20, 2020

=== Season 1 (2016) ===
No. overall	No. in season	Title	Directed by	Written by	Original release date	U.S. viewers (millions)
1	1	"1960: John F. Kennedy vs Richard Nixon"	Christopher Spencer	Christopher Spencer	March 6, 2016	2.56
Republican Vice President Richard Nixon hopes to win the presidency in the 1960 election, but faces a tough challenge from Democratic Senator John F. Kennedy.
2	2	"1860: Abraham Lincoln vs Stephen A. Douglas"	Christopher Spencer	Christopher Spencer	March 13, 2016	1.98
Former Republican Representative Abraham Lincoln seeks to win the 1860 election by defeating Democratic Senator Stephen A. Douglas, as well as Southern Democratic Vice President John C. Breckinridge, and former Constitutional Unionist Senator John Bell.
3	3	"1988: George H.W. Bush vs Michael Dukakis"	David Bartlett	David Bartlett	March 20, 2016	0.91
Republican Vice President George H. W. Bush seeks to prevent Democratic Governor of Massachusetts Michael Dukakis from winning the 1988 election through dirty campaign tactics. Dukakis himself appears in the episode.
4	4	"1948: Harry Truman vs Thomas Dewey"	Kim Flitcroft	Kim Flitcroft	March 27, 2016	0.84
Democratic President Harry S. Truman attempts to defeat Republican Governor of New York Thomas E. Dewey and Dixiecrat Strom Thurmond in the 1948 election.
5	5	"1828: Andrew Jackson vs John Quincy Adams"^{†}	David Bartlett	David Bartlett	April 3, 2016	0.80
National Republican Party President John Quincy Adams faces off against Democrat Andrew Jackson again in 1828, four years after defeating Jackson in controversial election.
6	6	"1992: Bill Clinton vs George H.W. Bush"	Kim Flitcroft	Kim Flitcroft	April 10, 2016	0.96
Democratic Governor of Arkansas Bill Clinton looks to unseat Republican President George H. W. Bush and defeat independent politician Ross Perot in the election of 1992.

^{†} denotes an extended episode.

=== Season 2 (2020) ===
No. overall	No. in season	Title	Directed by	Written by	Original release date	U.S. viewers (millions)
7	1	"2008: Barack Obama vs John McCain"	Tim Kirby	Tim Kirby	February 16, 2020	N/A
The 2008 race sees freshman Senator Barack Obama go up against “maverick” Republican Senator John McCain.
8	2	"1980: Ronald Reagan vs Jimmy Carter"	Andrew Saunders	Unknown	February 23, 2020	N/A
The 1980 race sees President Jimmy Carter and Republican Ronald Reagan having to fight off fierce challenges from within, as both parties struggle to re-invent themselves and use the global media spotlight to their advantage.
9	3	"1964: Lyndon B. Johnson vs Barry Goldwater"	Unknown	Unknown	March 1, 2020	N/A
The 1964 race was held in a country still reeling from the assassination of President John F. Kennedy and pits incumbent Democratic President Lyndon B. Johnson against conservative Republican Barry Goldwater.
10	4	"1912: Woodrow Wilson vs Theodore Roosevelt vs William Howard Taft vs Eugene Debs"	Robin Dashwood	Unknown	March 8, 2020	N/A
The 1912 race is an election between three remarkable candidates – former Republican President Theodore Roosevelt, his anointed heir President William Howard Taft, scholarly and religious Democrat Woodrow Wilson.
11	5	"1976: Jimmy Carter vs Gerald Ford"	Unknown	Unknown	September 13, 2020	N/A
The presidential election of 1976 pits the political establishment, personified by Republican President Gerald Ford, against the untainted idealism of Democrat Jimmy Carter, the relatively unknown governor of Georgia.
12	6	"1952: Dwight D. Eisenhower vs Adlai Stevenson"	Tim Kirby	Tim Kirby	September 20, 2020	N/A
Republican General Dwight D. Eisenhower and Democrat Adlai Stevenson both were persuaded to run for the White House, but as the gloves come off this becomes a fierce battle for hearts and minds.

== Broadcast ==
Internationally, the series premiered in Australia on History on October 3, 2016.
