= Benjamin de Roo =

Australian gymnast

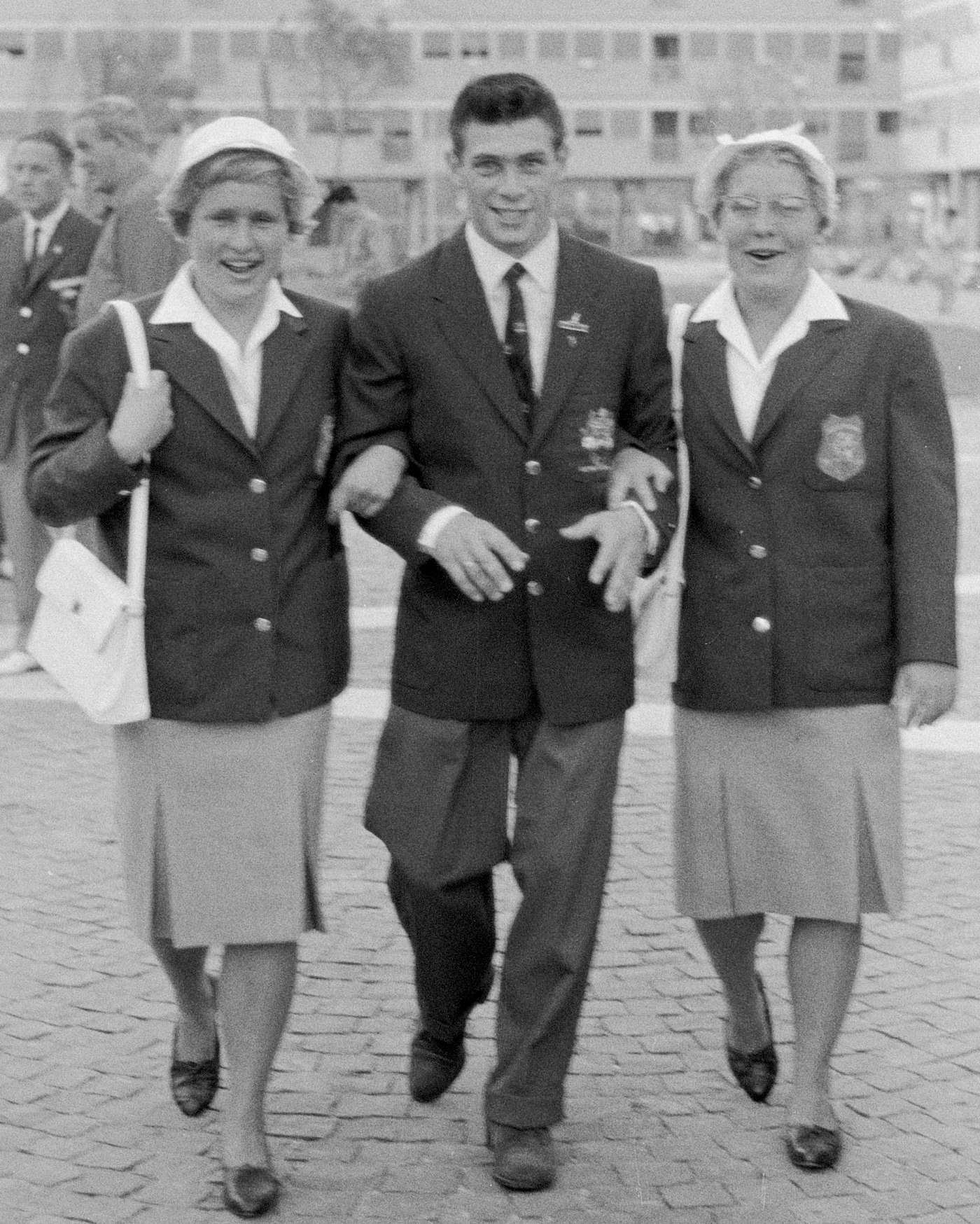
- Marianne Heemskerk, Benjamin de Roo and Tineke Lagerberg at the 1960 Olympics

Personal information
- Born: 11 February 1940 Enschede, Netherlands
- Died: 17 May 2016 (aged 76) Katoomba, New South Wales, Australia
- Height: 1.58 m (5 ft 2 in)
- Weight: 63 kg (139 lb)

Sport
- Sport: Artistic gymnastics

Benjamin hielke de Roo (11 February 1940 – 17 May 2016) was an Australian gymnast. He was born in the Netherlands, but in 1957 his family emigrated to Australia. In 1960 he became an Australian citizen, and he competed for Australia at the 1960 and 1964 Summer Olympics.
