= Style Network (Australia) =

Style Network Australia
- Country: Australia

Programming
- Language: English
- Picture format: 576i (SDTV)

Ownership
- Owner: Universal Networks International
- Sister channels: 13th Street; CNBC Asia; E! Syfy; Universal TV; Euronews

History
- Launched: 15 November 2009; 16 years ago
- Closed: 17 December 2019; 6 years ago

Style Network (known on air as Style) was an Australian pay television channel that owned by Universal Networks International. It was a domestic version of the American Style Network (which it outlasted by six years after that network was converted to the short-lived men's interest Esquire Network), and much like its American counterpart it featured fashion, design, and programming for women.

It was available through the Foxtel and FetchTV platforms. In 2014, it became available on Australian streaming service Foxtel Play.

== History ==
Style was launched on the Foxtel and Austar platforms on 15 November 2009. The channel shut down on 17 December 2019 without notice, after Foxtel changed around their lineup and NBCUniversal decided to consolidate domestic programming operations onto fewer networks, also ending the operations of 13th Street and Syfy at the end of 2019.

== Programming ==
=== Original local programming ===
- Fashion Bloggers (season 1 only, season 2 aired on sister channel E!)

=== Acquired programming from American Style Network ===
- Big Rich Texas
- Celebrity Closet Confidential
- Clean House
- Fashion Hunters
- Girl Meets Gown
- Jerseylicious
- Little Women: LA
- Pregnant and Dating
- Ruby
- Styled to Rock
- The Amandas
- The Jennie Garth Project

=== Acquired programming from other networks ===
- Bringing Sexy Back
- Double Divas
- How'd You Get So Rich?
- The Good Buy Girls

== See also ==
- Esquire Network, formerly the American version of the Style Network
