= 13th Street (Australian TV channel) =

Australian television channel

- Country: Australia

Programming
- Language: English
- Picture format: 576i (SDTV 16:9); 1080i (HDTV 16:9)
- Timeshift service: 13th Street + 2

Ownership
- Owner: NBCUniversal
- Sister channels: CNBC Australia; E! Style Network; Syfy; Universal TV; Euronews

History
- Launched: 15 November 2009
- Closed: 31 December 2019
- Replaced by: Fox Sleuth

Links
- Website: www.13thstreet.com.au

13th Street was an Australian television channel which specialised in airing action and suspense programmes. The channel was owned by NBCUniversal and was launched on 15 November 2009 as part of Foxtel's Next Generation launch. It launched on Fetch TV in 2017 as part of Fetch TV's channel pack revamp.

The same business that runs 13th Street in other nations also owned 13th Street in Australia. It was the first 13th Street to use the new logo, which Universal Networks International debuted at MIPCOM in October 2009

On 3 November 2014, 13th Street launched a HD simulcast on Foxtel. In addition, it moved from channel 113 to channel 118 and 13th Street + 2 moved from channel 163 to channel 160. It launched on channel 110 on the IPTV service Fetch TV in 2017. It ceased broadcasting on 31 December 2019, alongside sister channel Syfy. The last program broadcast was Miss Fisher's Murder Mysteries. It was replaced by Fox Sleuth.

== Programming ==
Programming on 13th Street was a mix of Australian, British, American and Canadian murder mysteries and crime dramas. The channel featured television series, mini-series and movies. Some of its programming was moved from sister channel Universal Channel when 13th Street launched (largely murder mystery style programs), however a larger range of premieres launched on 13th Street.

=== Final programming ===
- The Brokenwood Mysteries
- Frankie Drake Mysteries
- Grantchester
- Kemper on Kemper: Inside the Mind of a Serial Killer
- In Defence Of
- The Jury Speaks
- Magnum, P.I.
- Miss Fisher's Murder Mysteries
- Murdoch Mysteries
- Snapped
- Tara Moss In Conversation
- Vera

=== Former programming ===
- Above Suspicion
- Accused
- Agatha Christie's Marple
- Agatha Christie's Poirot
- Amber
- The Bletchley Circle
- The Body Farm
- Case Histories
- City Homicide
- Close to Home
- Columbo
- The Commander
- Criminal Justice
- Da Vinci's Inquest
- DNA
- Flashpoint (moved to Universal Channel)
- The Gil Mayo Mysteries
- Halifax f.p.
- Haven (moved to Syfy)
- Heartbeat
- Identity
- In Plain Sight
- The Inspector Lynley Mysteries
- Inspector Morse
- Jack Taylor
- Jonathan Creek
- The Jury
- King
- The Last Detective
- Law & Order: UK (seasons 1-3 only, seasons 4-5 shown on Universal Channel)
- Life
- Line of Duty
- Maigret
- Memphis Beat
- Messiah
- Monk
- Mr & Mrs Murder
- The Mrs Bradley Mysteries
- Murphy's Law
- Pie in the Sky
- Republic of Doyle
- Restless
- Ripper Street
- Rosemary and Thyme
- The Runaway
- The Silence
- Single-Handed
- Taggart
- Trial & Retribution
- Wire in the Blood

== Ratings ==
Since its launch, 13th Street has dramatically increased its ratings to become one of the most watched subscription channels in Australia. Shortly after its November 2009 launch, it received a 0.6% share in the week beginning 29 November. By the end of December, ratings tripled to a 1.8% share.
