= The Briefcase (Australian TV program) =

- Logo
- Genre: Reality
- Created by: Dave Broome
- Country of origin: Australia
- Original language: English
- No. of seasons: 1
- No. of episodes: 6

Production
- Running time: 60 minutes

Original release
- Network: Nine Network
- Release: June 20 – August 9, 2016

Related
- The Briefcase

The Briefcase is an Australian reality television program, based on the American program of the same name, which airs on the Nine Network. Each episode sees two Australian families, struggling financially, each given $100,000 in cash that they must decide either to keep for themselves or to give all or in part to help out the other family, unaware that their counterparts are also faced with the same dilemma.

The six episode program debuted on 20 June 2016. It received a generally negative reception from audiences and critics both before and after its premiere broadcast, with one commentator calling it "exploitative poverty porn at its worst". After two episodes, the program was moved from its 7:30pm timeslot to after 9:30pm following low ratings which also resulted in a poor lead-in for Nine's marquee drama Love Child which followed immediately after. The last episode was burnt off as counter-programming against the 2016 Summer Olympics.

== Development and production ==
The Australian rights to the show was secured before the American program began broadcasting. The Nine Network's Head of Development later criticised the American version for its "stunt" casting and called it a "freak show", saying the Australian version will be "fundamentally different" and feature "average families", following negative reaction and the ultimate cancellation of the original US version.

The contestants on the program were initially not informed about the true nature of the show. Instead they were informed that they would be appearing on a programme titled Making Ends Meet, and would receive financial advice about their situation. The contestants had mixed feelings over being misled, but ultimately had a positive experience filming the show.

== Episodes ==
=== Episode 1 ===
Details	Families	
Details	The Carter Family	The McCracken Family
Money Received	$100,000	
Money Given Away	$100,000	$100,000
Given to	McCracken Family	Carter Family
Conditions	none	none
Money Kept	$0	$0
Money Given	$100,000	$100,000

=== Episode 2 ===
Details	Families	
Details	The Richmond Family	The Hockley Family
Money Received	$100,000	
Money Given Away	$25,000	$50,000
Given to	Hockley Family	Richmond Family
Conditions	none	none
Money Kept	$75,000	$50,000
Money Given	$50,000	$25,000

== Broadcast ==
No.	Title	Original release date	Australia viewers (millions)
1	"Carter/McCracken"	June 20, 2016	0.733
2	"Richmond/Hockley"	June 27, 2016	0.491
3	TBA	July 4, 2016	0.303
4	TBA	July 11, 2016	0.327
5	TBA	July 18, 2016	0.317
6	TBA	August 9, 2016	N/A
