= Syfy (Australia) =

- Country: Australia
- Broadcast area: Australia

Programming
- Language: English
- Picture format: 1080i HDTV (downscaled to 16:9 576i for the SDTV feed)
- Timeshift service: Syfy + 2

Ownership
- Owner: Universal Networks International (NBCUniversal)
- Sister channels: 13th Street; CNBC Australia; E! Style Network; Universal TV; Euronews

History
- Launched: 1 January 2014
- Replaced: SF Channel
- Closed: 17 December 2019 (On Foxtel); 31 December 2019
- Replaced by: Fox Sci-Fi (Foxtel only)

Links
- Website: syfy.com.au

Availability

Streaming media
- Foxtel Go: Channel 123

Syfy was an Australian pay television channel dedicated to science fiction and fantasy television shows and movies. The channel was launched on 1 January 2014, replacing SF.

On 31 December 2019, it was replaced with Fox Sci-Fi.

== History ==
In August 2013, it was announced that Foxtel had failed to complete negotiations with the TV1 General Entertainment Partnership (of which NBCUniversal was a part member) for a new carriage deal for their channel SF (an Australian science fiction channel), and would ultimately replace it with another science fiction dedicated channel once SF's carriage deal had expired. It was announced in September that Syfy, wholly owned by NBCUniversal, would replace SF in early 2014.

Syfy is part of the international brand Syfy Universal and is wholly owned and operated by Universal Networks International (a division of NBCUniversal). In contrast, SF was an Australian exclusive brand with only 33.33% owned by NBCUniversal (with the remaining shares equally being held by CBS Studios International and Sony Pictures Television).

On 15 April 2014, Syfy launched on Australian IPTV provider Fetch TV.

On 14 February 2017, the channel was made available in HD for Fetch TV customers.

On 17 September 2017, the channel received a new logo alongside refreshed branding as part of an international overhaul of the brand by NBCUniversal.

On 7 November 2019, Foxtel announced that Fox Sci-Fi would replace Syfy on 17 December 2019. The network continued on Fetch TV until the stroke of midnight on 31 December 2019.

== Programming ==
Programming featured classic and new science fiction and fantasy television shows and movies.

=== First-run Programming ===
==== Original Programming ====
- Haunting: Australia

==== Acquired Programming ====
- 12 Monkeys (seasons 1–2)
- Channel Zero
- Continuum (seasons 3–4)
- Dark Matter
- Defiance (seasons 2-3)
- Face Off
- Geeks who Drink
- Haven (seasons 4–5)
- Killjoys
- Misfits (season 5)
- The Magicians
- The Shannara Chronicles
- Warehouse 13 (season 5)
- Z Nation (seasons 1–2)

=== Second-run Programming ===
- Alphas
- Angel
- Battlestar Galactica
- Battlestar Galactica (miniseries)
- Buffy the Vampire Slayer
- Charmed
- Destination Truth
- Doctor Who
- Eureka
- Fact or Faked: Paranormal Files
- Ghost Hunters International
- Grimm (season 1)
- Haven (seasons 1–3)
- Hollywood Treasure
- Knight Rider (2008 TV series)
- Legend Quest
- Misfits (seasons 1–4)
- Orphan Black
- Paranormal Witness
- Primeval
- Red Dwarf
- Sanctuary
- Stargate Atlantis
- Stargate SG-1
- Star Trek: The Next Generation
- Star Trek: Voyager
- Torchwood
- Warehouse 13 (seasons 1–4)

=== Movies ===
- 10.5
- 500 MPH Storm
- American Warships
- Arachnoquake
- Battledogs
- Bigfoot
- CAT.8
- Category 7: The End of the World
- The 12 Disasters of Christmas
- The Poseidon Adventure
- Dawn of the Dead
- Eve of Destruction
- Exploding Sun
- Ice Road Terror
- Jabberwock
- Metal Shifters
- Miami Magma
- Panic at Rock Island
- Sharknado
- Stonados
- Tasmanian Devils

== Criticism ==
Syfy has come under criticism from Foxtel subscribers for a number of programming related issues, specifically regarding the high number of repeats and the low quality of the Syfy programming. Significantly, Syfy Australia did not hold the rights to any of the Star Trek franchise, while its predecessor did. This has changed and Deep Space Nine, Enterprise, The Next Generation, The Original Series and Voyager has made their way onto the channel.
