= Ken Sparkes =

Australian radio presenter, television personality and voiceover artist (1940–2016)

- Born: 20 July 1940; Sydney, Australia
- Died: 11 September 2016 (aged 76); Paris, France
- Occupations: Radio and television personality (actor, singer and host); disc jockey; voice-over artist; journalist; sportscaster/commentator; pop singer; record label founder
- Years active: 1956–2016
- Employer: Nine Network
- Known for: The Voice of Channel 9

Ken Sparkes (20 July 1940 – 11 September 2016) was an Australian radio presenter, television personality (actor, singer, host), disc jockey and voice-over artist, he also worked as an investigative journalist, sportscaster/commentator and launched briefly a pop career and co-founded his own record label. He was a presenter of radio programs, including presenting the breakfast program on Adelaide's 5KA. His early career was at Melbourne's 3UZ, before launching a career in television in the mid-60's.

== Biography ==
He had one of the best known media voices in Australia and was known for years as the "voice of Channel 9". His voice was well known as a booth announcer for the Nine Network and Network Ten. He was host of pop music show Kommotion, for the 0-10 Network, and appeared on Bandstand on the Nine Network.

Sparkes died of a heart attack on 11 September 2016, while hosting a river cruise in France.

His funeral was held at the Camelia Chapel in Macquarie Park Crematorium, Sydney on Friday 30 September 2016.

== Radio career ==
Sparkes commenced playing requests for fellow patients at Princess Juliana Hospital Turramurra NSW, later being accepted aged 16 as a junior radio announcer at 2MG Mudgee NSW. He moved to 2GB Sydney where he became Sydney’s youngest disc jockey at age 19. He featured on many radio shows across the Macquarie Network from popular music program “The All Australian Hit Parade”, to the live “Music Man” that included Australian musicians and singers. He also hosted a radio show that included his chosen sport, motor racing “The World of the Motor Car.”

By the mid 1960s Sparkes had taken over the night time slot on 3UZ Melbourne, which was then the dominant radio force in that city. A visiting US radio consultant Ted Randall heard Ken on 3UZ and opened the door for him in Los Angeles. From 1969 to 1971 Sparkes presented daily shows on KCBS (AM)/KCBS-FM Los Angeles, and at one stage was posted to Vietnam where he reported for a US radio syndicate with the Screaming Eagles 101st Airborne Division. After returning to 3UZ in Melbourne, he worked at a number of radio stations including 2UE Sydney until 2007.

== Television career ==
He performed as an actor, singer and host on many pop and late night Australian shows including Bandstand, Hi Fi Club, Kommotion, Australian Pop Music Awards, Homicide, Bellbird and The Johnny O’ Keefe Show. He also worked as a sportcaster and became a television commentator for the Seven Network, TEN Network and Nine Network's Wide World of Sport hosting Formula One coverage. By performing “voice over” or booth announcer work he became one of the most recognisable voices on Australian electronic media. At one time he simultaneously worked for competitors Channel Ten Sydney and Channel 9 Melbourne, later solely for the Nine Network on investigative journalism shows A Current Affair and Sixty Minutes. In 1974 according to newspaper reports the Melbourne studios of Channel 9 were held up by an armed gang, and Sparkes chased the robbers in his car, but lost them.

Ken was the original host of Nine Wide World of Sports Formula 1 broadcasts.

Until his death Sparkes hosted ‘Jukebox Saturday Night’, a viewer request program which screens music video clips from the 1950s through to 1980s. The show screens on cable in Australia on Foxtel’s Aurora Channel 183. He was also a Senior Journalist at Xinhua (Shanghai) News Agency where he wrote and presented TV stories on Australia. He had no plans for retirement.

== Music and record company career ==
In 1969, Sparkes co-founded the record label Sparmac. One of its first signings was the group Daddy Cool, whose first single, "Eagle Rock", was a #1 smash hit, and whose debut album Daddy Who? Daddy Cool! was the biggest-selling Australian pop LP ever released up to that time. The label also launched the career of Rick Springfield, Healing Force and Gerry & The Joy Band. In the late 1950s, while working as a DJ at 2MG Mudgee, and later at 2GB Sydney, Sparkes began recording rock and country songs for Rex and Festival Records, including ‘Christmas at Home’ (1959) and ‘Ride Wide’ (planned release 1960). In 1965 he released a version of a Jesse Stone track, backed by popular Melbourne band The Strangers. The song did not chart but has been praised as “one of the best in the DJs on Disc genre”. In 1967, Sparkes released a single, featuring "Lonely Weekends" by Charlie Rich on the A side, and the Chiffons song, "One Fine Day", written by Carole King and Gerry Goffin, on the B side.

== Awards ==
Sparkes won numerous international and Australian radio & TV awards including gold medals at the New York Radio Festival, Hollywood Broadcasters Awards & Australia's Rawards (Australian Commercial Radio Awards).
