= List of programs broadcast by Special Broadcasting Service =

Australian SBS programs broadcast list

This is a list of television programmes that are either currently being broadcast or have previously been broadcast on SBS Television's SBS (formerly SBS ONE), SBS2 (formerly SBS Viceland and SBS TWO/SBS 2), SBS Food, NITV or SBS WorldWatch in Australia.

== Current programming ==
=== Domestic ===
==== News and current affairs ====
- Big Mob Brekky (2020–present on NITV)
- Dateline (1984–present)
- The Feed (2013–2019 on SBS2, 2020–2022 on SBS)
- Insight (1995–present)
- NITV News (2008–present on NITV)
- Living Black (2003–present)
- The Point (2016–present on NITV)
- SBS Arabic News (2022–present on SBS WorldWatch)
- SBS Mandarin News (2022–present on SBS WorldWatch)
- SBS World News (1980–present)
- SBS World Watch (1993–present on SBS and SBS2) (Note: Most of non-English news bulletins has been relocated to newly launched SBS WorldWatch since 23 May 2022.)

==== Drama ====
- Erotic Stories (2023–present)
- Firebite (2022 on AMC+, 2023 on NITV)
- Night Bloomers (2023–present)
- Safe Home (2023–present)
- True Colours (2022–present)
- While the Men Are Away (2023)

==== Comedy ====
- Latecomers (2022–present)

==== Reality ====
- Alone Australia (2023–present)

==== Factual/Documentaries ====
- Asking for It (2023–present)
- Australia Uncovered (2021–present)
- The Swap (2023–present)
- Every Family Has A Secret (2019–present)
- Going Places with Ernie Dingo (2017–present on NITV)
- The First Inventors (2023–present, shared with Network 10)
- Great Australian Walks with Julia Zemiro (2023–present)
- Inside Sydney Airport (2023–present)
- The Jury: Death on the Staircase (2024)
- Keeping Hope (2023–present)
- The Kingdom (2023)
- Larapinta (2023 on NITV)
- Meet the Neighbours (2023–present)
- Our Law (2020–present on NITV)
- The Swiping Game (2020–present)
- Wildlife ER (2023–present)
- Who Do You Think You Are? (2008–present)
- Who the Bloody Hell Are We? (2023)

==== Lifestyle ====
- Adam and Poh's Great Australian Bites (2023–present)
- The Cook Up with Adam Liaw (2021–present)
- Destination Flavour (2012–present)
- Barossa Gourmet with Justine Schofield (2023)
- The Chocolate Queen (2019 on Lifestyle, 2022–present)
- Asia Unplated with Diana Chan (2019–present)
- Food Safari (2006–present)
- India Unplated (2021–present)
- Khanh Ong's Wild Food (2023–present)
- Luke Nguyen's India (2023–present)
- Paradise Kitchen Bali (2023–present)
- Plat du Tour (2020–present)
- Strait to the Plate (2021–present on NITV)

==== Game Shows ====
- Celebrity Letters and Numbers (2021–present)
- Celebrity Mastermind (2020–present)
- Mastermind (2019–present)
- Patriot Brains (2021–present)

==== Sport Talk ====
- Cycling Central (2003–2007, 2010–present)
- SBS Speedweek (1995–present)

==== Sports ====
- Futsal: UEFA Futsal Champions League (2019–present)
- Rugby league: Indigenous All Stars (2016–present on NITV)
- Soccer: UEFA Women's Champions League (2019–present)

Licensed from beIN Sports:

- Soccer: International Champions Cup (2019–present)

Licensed from Fox Sports:

- Cycling: Tour de France (1980–present)

Licensed from Optus Sport:

- Soccer: FIFA World Cup (1986–present)

==== Children's ====
- Barrumbi Kids (2022–present on NITV)
- Little J & Big Cuz (2017–present on NITV, shared with ABC Kids)

==== Music ====
- Eurovision: Australia Decides (2019–2022)
- National Indigenous Music Awards (2013, 2020–present)
- SBS PopAsia (2011–2013 on SBS, 2013–present on SBS2)

=== International ===
==== News ====
International news is broadcast on SBS networks throughout the morning, all recorded from the previous day's broadcast.

Language	Network/Broadcaster	SBS network
(Australia) English	APAC Network	SBS
(Philippines) English	ABS-CBN (ANC)	SBS
(Japan) English	NHK (NHK World-Japan)	SBS
(India) English	DD (DD India)	SBS
(United Kingdom) English	BBC (BBC One/BBC News)	SBS
(United States) English	PBS	SBS
(United States) English	ABC	SBS; SBS2 (ABC News Nightline)
(United States) English	Indian Country Today	SBS2
(Canada) English	APTN	SBS2
(Canada) English	CBC (CBC TV/CBC News Network)	SBS2
(Fiji) English	FBC (FBC TV)	SBS2
(New Zealand) English	Whakaata Māori	SBS2
(Turkey) English	TRT (TRT World)	SBS2
(Qatar) English	Al Jazeera	SBS; SBS2 (Newshour)
(Germany) English	DW (DW English)	SBS (DW News); SBS2 (Global 3000); SBS WorldWatch (Late night simulcast)
(France) English	France 24	SBS (Live from Paris); SBS WorldWatch (Late night simulcast)
(Philippines) Filipino	Kapamilya Channel, ALLTV, A2Z (via TFC)	SBS WorldWatch (Note: This channel also aired SBS-produced local news bulletins in both Arabic and Mandarin, which premiered early on SBS On Demand prior to the channel launch.)
(Thailand) Thai	Thai PBS	SBS WorldWatch
(Indonesia) Indonesian	TVRI (TVRI Nasional)	SBS WorldWatch
(South Korea) Korean	YTN (via YTN WORLD)	SBS WorldWatch
(Japan) Japanese	NHK (NHK G via NHK World Premium)	SBS WorldWatch
(India) Hindi	Aaj Tak	SBS WorldWatch
(India) Tamil	Polimer News	SBS WorldWatch
(India) Malayalam	DD (DD Malayalam)	SBS WorldWatch
(India) Gujarati	DD (DD Girnar)	SBS WorldWatch
(India) Punjabi	PTC News	SBS WorldWatch
(Bangladesh) Bengali	Channel i	SBS WorldWatch
(Sri Lanka) Sinhala	SLRC (Rupavahini)	SBS WorldWatch
(Pakistan) Urdu	PTV (PTV Home/PTV News via PTV Global)	SBS WorldWatch
(Nepal) Nepali	Nepal Television	SBS WorldWatch
(Malta) Maltese	PBS Malta (TVM)	SBS WorldWatch
(Somalia) Somali	Universal TV	SBS WorldWatch
(Turkey) Turkish	TRT (TRT Haber)	SBS WorldWatch
(France) Arabic	France 24	SBS WorldWatch
(France) French	France Télévisions (France 2)	SBS WorldWatch
(Germany) German	ZDF	SBS WorldWatch
(Italy) Italian	RAI (Rai 1 via Rai Italia)	SBS WorldWatch
(Spain) Spanish	RTVE (La 1 via TVE Internacional)	SBS WorldWatch
(Portugal) Portuguese	RTP (RTP1 via RTP Mundo)	SBS WorldWatch
(Netherlands) Dutch	NPO/NOS (NPO 1 via BVN)	SBS WorldWatch
(Poland) Polish	Polsat Group (Polsat/Polsat News)	SBS WorldWatch
(Romania) Romanian	TVR (TVR 1 via TVRi)	SBS WorldWatch
(Hungary) Hungarian	MTVA (Duna/M1 via Duna World)	SBS WorldWatch
(Greece) Greek	ERT (ERT1 via ERT World)	SBS WorldWatch
(Armenia) Armenian	ARMTV (Armenia 1)	SBS WorldWatch
(North Macedonia) Macedonian	MRT (MRT 1)	SBS WorldWatch
(Croatia) Croatian	HRT (HRT 1)	SBS WorldWatch
(Bosnia and Herzegovina) Bosnian	BHRT (BHT 1)	SBS WorldWatch
(Serbia) Serbian	RTS (RTS1)	SBS WorldWatch
(Ukraine) Ukrainian	Suspilne (Pershyi)	SBS WorldWatch

==== Variety ====
- Vs. Arashi

==== Documentary ====
- Michael Mosley's Wonders of the Human Body

==== Comedy ====
- 8 Out of 10 Cats Does Countdown (UK; SBS VICELAND)
- Atlanta (USA; SBS VICELAND)
- The Big Fat Quiz of the Year (UK; SBS VICELAND)
- Brooklyn Nine-Nine (US; SBS VICELAND)
- Fargo (US; SBS VICELAND)
- Letterkenny (Canada; SBS VICELAND)
- The Orville (USA; SBS VICELAND)

==== Reality ====
- Alone (US; SBS VICELAND)
- Alone: The Beast (US; SBS VICELAND)
- Alone: Frozen (US; SBS VICELAND)
- Alone UK (UK; SBS VICELAND)

==== Game Shows ====
- Jeopardy! (USA; SBS, SBS VICELAND)

==== Drama ====
- The Good Fight (US)
- Gomorrah (Italy)
- The Handmaid's Tale (TV series) (US)
- Hard Rock Medical (Canada)
- Inspector Montalbano (Italy)
- Inspector Rex (Austria, Italy)
- Lost Girl (Canada)
- Luther (US)
- Trickster (Canada; NITV)
- War of the Worlds (US, France)
- World on Fire (UK)

==== Soap Opera ====
- Shortland Street (NZ)

==== Annual Events ====
- Eurovision Song Contest (1983–present)

== Upcoming series ==
=== 2024/2025 ===
==== Domestic ====
- 2.6 Seconds (doco)
- Australia: An Unofficial History (doco)
- Dreaming Big (children's)
- Emily, I Am Kam (doco)
- Great Australian Road Trips (factual/doco)
- A Girl's Guide to Hunting, Fishing and Wild Cooking (lifestyle: 2021, 2025)
- Island Echoes with Nornie Bero (lifestyle)
- Journey Home: David Gulpilil (doco)
- Marion Grasby's Endless Summer (lifestyle)
- Memory Bites with Matt Moran (lifestyle)
- Moonbird (drama)
- Moni (drama)
- Our Medicine (doco)
- Robodebt (factual/doco)
- The Secret DNA of Us (doco)
- Skin in the Game (doco)
- The Idea of Australia (factual/doco)
- Warm Props (drama)

==== International ====
- Daddy Issues (UK, drama)
- Playing Nice (UK)
- Sherlock & Daughter (UK, mystery)
- Smilla's Sense of Snow
- Travels with Agatha Christie with Sir David Suchet (UK, doco)
- Virdee (UK, crime)

== Former programming ==
=== Domestic ===
==== News and current affairs ====
- Hotline (1990–2007)
- Global Village (1998–2015)
- Mandarin News Australia (2010–2012 on SBS2)
- Toyota World Sport (2005–2006)

==== Drama ====
- Appetite (2023)
- A Beginner's Guide to Grief (2022)
- Better Man (2013)
- Carla Cametti PD (2009)
- Chainsaw (2009)
- The Circuit (2007–2009)
- Creamerie (2021–present)
- Dead Lucky (2018)
- Deep Water (2016)
- East West 101 (2007–2011)
- Four Years Later (2024)
- The Girl from Steel City (1986)
- Going Home (2000–2001)
- Hungry Ghosts (2020)
- The Hunting (2019)
- In Between (1987)
- The Liberation of Skopje (1981)
- New Gold Mountain (2021)
- On the Ropes (2018)
- One of the Lucky Ones (2009)
- The Principal (2015)
- RAN (Remote Area Nurse) (2006)
- Safe Harbour (2018)
- Saved (2009)
- Sunshine (2017)
- Swift Street (2024)
- The Tailings (2021)
- The Three Sea-Wolves (1980)
- The Tourist (1987)
- Tudawali (1988)
- Under the Skin (1993)
- The Unusual Suspects (2021)
- Women of the Sun (1981)

==== Comedy ====
- The Back Side of Television (2021, moved to Binge)
- Bogan Pride (2008)
- Danger 5 (2012–2015)
- Dave in the Life (2009–2010)
- Effie, Just Quietly (2001)
- The Family Law (2016–2019)
- House Gang (1996)
- Housos (2011–2013)
- Iggy and Ace (2021)
- John Safran vs God (2004)
- John Safran's Music Jamboree (2002)
- Kick (2007)
- The Last Year of Television (2020–2021, moved to Binge)
- Legally Brown (2013–2014)
- Life Support (2004)
- Marx and Venus (2007)
- Newstopia (2007–2008)
- Pizza (2000–2007)
- Quads! (2001–2002, co-produced with Nelvana)
- Speaking in Tongues (2005–2006)
- Swift and Shift Couriers (2008–2011)
- Wilfred (2007–2009)

==== Variety / entertainment ====
- In Siberia Tonight (2005–2006)
- Room 101 (2015)
- Salam Cafe (2008)

==== Reality ====
- The Chefs' Line (2017–2018)
- Child Genius (2018–2019)
- The Colony (2005)
- Eco House Challenge (2007)
- The Family (2011–2012)
- Family Rules (2017–2020 on NITV)
- Living With The Enemy (2014)
- Look Me in the Eye (2017)
- Nerds FC (2006–2007)
- The Nest (2008–2009)
- Top Gear Australia (2008–2010, later moved to Nine/Paramount+)
- Undressed (2017)

==== Lifestyle ====
- Adam and Poh's Malaysia in Australia (2021)
- Adam Liaw's Road Trip for Good (2020)
- Andy & Ben Eat Australia (2017 on Food Network)
- Australia's Food Bowl with Stefano De Pieri (2021)
- Born to Cook: Jack Stein Downunder (2017)
- Chef Out West (2021)
- Cook Like an Italian (2019–2022)
- Costa's Garden Odyssey (2009–2011)
- Fashionista (2003–2005)
- Food Lovers' Guide to Australia (1996–2006)
- Gourmet Farmer (2010–2019)
- Hipsters (2015)
- Inside Heston's World (2016)
- Is Your House Killing You? (2007)
- Lonely Planet Six Degrees
- Luke Nguyen's Vietnam (2009–2011)
- Lyndey and Blair's Taste of Greece (2011)
- Malaysia Gourmet with Justine Schofield (lifestyle)
- A Middle East Feast with Shane Delia (2021)
- My Family Feast (2009–2010)
- On Country Kitchen (2017)
- Peter Kuruvita's Coastal Kitchen (2016, 2018)
- Poh & Co. (2015–2016)
- Small Business Secrets (2016)
- The Streets with Dan Hong (2022)
- The Streets: Hong Kong (2024)
- Silvia's Tastes Like Home (2024)
- Taste of the Tropics (2024)
- Taste Le Tour (2004–2019)
- The Movie Show (1986–2006)
- Vasili's Garden (2007)
- Zumbo (2011)

==== Game shows ====
- ADbc (2009)
- HotSpell (2007)
- Letters and Numbers (2010–2012)
- The Squiz (2009)
- Visquiz (1985)

==== Documentaries ====
- A Pang for Brasil (2014)
- Addicted Australia (2020)
- Australia Come Fly with Me (2020)
- Australia in Colour (2019–2021)
- Australia vs Anxiety (2021)
- The Australian Wars (2022)
- Australia's Health Revolution with Dr. Michael Mosley (2021)
- Australia's Sleep Revolution with Dr. Michael Mosley (2024)
- Birdsville or Bust (2020)
- The Bowraville Murders (2021)
- The Beach (2020)
- The Carnival (doco)
- The Children in the Pictures (2021)
- Could You Survive on the Breadline? (2021)
- Decadence (2006–2007)
- Filthy Rich and Homeless (2017–2018, 2020)
- First Australians (2008)
- First Contact (2014, 2016)
- Framed (2021)
- Go Back to Where You Came From (2011–2012, 2015, 2018)
- Great Australian Railway Journeys (2020)
- Help (2006)
- Her Name is Nanny Nellie (2024 on NITV)
- History Bites Back (2021 on NITV)
- The Hospital: In the Deep End (2024)
- Incarceration Nation (2021)
- Indian Wedding Race (2016)
- Inside Australia (2003–2009)
- Inside Central Station (2021)
- Is Australia Racist? (2016)
- Is Australia Sexist? (2016)
- The Jewish Nazi? (2024)
- Kindred (2024)
- Last Chance to Save a Life (2024)
- Life on the Outside (2022)
- Lost for Words (2021–2022)
- Marry Me, Marry My Family (2018–2020)
- The Matchmakers (2024)
- Medicine or Myth? (2019)
- The Miracle Fix? (2024)
- The Mission (2023)
- My Space is an Amazing Place
- Osher Günsberg: A Matter of Life and Death (2021)
- Osher Günsberg: A World of Pain (2024)
- Our African Roots (2021)
- Parent Rescue (2007)
- Podlove (2007)
- Ray Martin: The Last Goodbye (2024)
- Sandman in Siberia (2005)
- Secret Life of Death (2018)
- Secrets of Our Cities (2017, 2020)
- See What You Made Me Do (2021)
- Shaun Micallef's Origin Odyssey (2024)
- Shaun Micallef's Stairway to Heaven (2015, 2017)
- Storyline Australia (2004–2007)
- Strong Female Lead (2021)
- Strictly Jewish (2016)
- Struggle Street (2015, 2017)
- Stutter School (2021)
- Testing Teachers (2017)
- This Is Brazil! (2014)
- Two of Us (2006)
- What Does Australia Really Think About? (2021)
- Where Are You Really From? (2019–2020)
- Who Gets to Stay in Australia? (2019)
- Wild Things (2021)
- World Tales

==== Children's programs ====
- Captain Socceroo
- Eddie's Lil' Homies (2024 on NITV, shared with Netflix)
- Kaleidoscope (1986–1992)
- Tiny Toon Adventures
- Thalu (2020 on NITV, shared with ABC Me)

==== Sports ====
- Basketball: NBL (2016–2017, 2019–2021)
- Soccer: A-League (2013–2017, on SBS and SBS2), W-League (2017–2020)
- Tennis: US Open (2017–2021)

==== Sport talk ====
- The Full Brazilian (2014)
- League Nation Live (2016 on NITV)
- The Marngrook Footy Show (2007–2010 on NITV and C31 Melbourne, NITV only in early 2011, moved to ABC2 2011–2012, return to NITV 2013–2019)
- Santo, Sam and Ed's Cup Fever! (2010)
- SBS Courtside (2019–2022)
- Thursday FC (SBS 2 2013–2014)
- Under the Grandstand (2005)
- The World Game (2001–2019)

==== Music ====
- RocKwiz (2005–2016)
- So Frenchy, So Chic (2005)

==== Special events ====
- Oz Concert
- Sydney Gay and Lesbian Mardi Gras (2014–2021)

=== International ===
==== News ====
International news was broadcast on SBS networks throughout the morning, all recorded from the previous day's broadcast.

Language	Network
(New Zealand) English	TVNZ 1
(Fiji) English	Fiji One
(Malaysia) Malaysian	TV1
(Philippines) Filipino	NBN (now PTV)
(Vietnam) Vietnamese	VTV (via VTV4)
(China) English	CGTN (Note: SBS suspended broadcasting programs from CCTV and CGTN following allegations that both broadcasters aired 'forced confessions'.)
(China) Mandarin	CCTV-4
(Hong Kong) Cantonese	ATV
(Hong Kong) Cantonese	TVB Jade
(India) Hindi	NDTV India (Note: Currently available on SBS On Demand)
(India) Tamil	Polimer TV
(India) Hindi	DD News
(United Arab Emirates) Arabic	Dubai TV
(Lebanon) Arabic	TL
(Cyprus) Greek	CyBC
(Greece) Greek	ANT1 (via ANT1 Pacific)
(Germany) German	DW Deutsch
(France) French	TV5Monde
(Poland) Polish	TVP
(Czech Republic) Czech	ČT
(Hungary) Hungarian	MTV
(Russia) Russian	NTV (Note: SBS has suspended broadcasting programs from NTV and Russia Today due to the 2022 Russian invasion of Ukraine following feedback from Russian-speaking viewers. However, Russian-language programmes are still being offered on SBS Radio.)
(Russia) English	Russia Today
(Chile) Latin American Spanish (Note: Listed as "Latin American News")	TVN

==== Adult Animation ====
- Angry Kid (UK)
- Animal Farm (UK, originally aired on ABC)
- Aqua Teen Hunger Force (US, Now on 9Go!)
- John Callahan's Quads! (Canada)
- bro'Town (NZ)
- Drawn Together (US)
- Happy Tree Friends (US)
- Harvey Birdman, Attorney at Law (US, Now on 9Go!)
- Night Sweats (Canada)
- The Ricky Gervais Show (UK)
- Life's a Zoo (Canada)
- Robot Chicken (US, Now on 9Go!)
- Robin (Sweden)
- Stripperella (US)
- South Park (US; 1997–2013 on SBS, 2013–2021 on SBS VICELAND; Shared with 10 Shake)
- Ugly Americans (US)

==== Anime ====
- Attack on Titan
- Bleach
- Bubblegum Crisis Tokyo 2040
- Ghost in the Shell: Stand Alone Complex
- Gunsmith Cats
- Neon Genesis Evangelion
- Samurai Champloo
- Assassination Classroom
- Space Dandy

==== Drama ====
- The Awakening (Singapore)
- Big Love (US)
- Brookside (UK) (1987–1988)
- Butterfly (UK)
- Chateauvallon (France)
- Chimerica (UK)
- Comrades (Greece)
- Conquest of the Sky (France)
- Coronation Street (UK)
- Dance with Me (Brazil)
- Den of Wolves (Mexico)
- Derrick (Germany)
- The Devil's Games (Italy)
- Drunken City (Greece)
- Dublin Murders (Ireland)
- Empress Wu (Hong Kong)
- Entourage (US)
- Flight of Eagles (Turkey)
- Funland (UK)
- A Glass Full of Snow (Italy)
- Half Time (Germany)
- Heart (Italy)
- Heimat (Germany)
- Homeland (US)
- Italian Stories (Italy)
- Joys and Shadows (Spain)
- Knightfall (US, Czech Republic)
- The Little Drummer Girl (UK)
- Little Missy (Brazil)
- Mika (Sweden)
- Mino (Germany)
- The Name of the Rose (Italy)
- The New Pope (Italy, France, Spain)
- Oshin (Japan)
- Oz (US) (2004–2007)
- Police Station (France)
- Project Blue Book (US)
- Queer as Folk (Canada, US)
- The Return of the Written Off (Yugoslavia)
- The Salisbury Poisonings (UK)
- Shrewd Juanita (Spain)
- Spring (Brazil)
- Trust Me (UK)
- Unit One (Denmark)
- The Victim (UK)
- Vikings (Canada, Ireland)
- We Are Who We Are (US, Italy)
- Years and Years (UK)
- ZeroZeroZero (Italy)

==== Comedy ====
- 30 Rock (US, SBS 2)
- Aaagh! It's the Mr. Hell Show! (UK, Canada)
- Angry Kid (UK)
- Baddiel and Skinner Unplanned (UK)
- The Big Fat Quiz of Sport (UK)
- Broad City (US)
- Brooklyn Nine-Nine (SBS 2)
- Chappelle's Show (US, now airs on 7mate)
- Community (US, SBS 2)
- Corner Gas (Canada)
- Crank Yankers (US)
- Dadı (Turkey, 1984)
- Difficult People (US)
- Dr. Katz, Professional Therapist (US)
- Drop the Dead Donkey (UK)
- Drunk History (US)
- Entourage (US)
- The Fast Show (UK)
- Full Frontal with Samantha Bee (USA)
- Funland (UK)
- Garth Marenghi's Darkplace (UK)
- Gerhard Reinke's Wanderlust (US)
- Have I Got News for You (UK)
- KYTV (UK)
- The Lenny Henry Show (UK)
- Mystery Science Theater 3000 (US)
- Nathan for You (US)
- Nighty Night (UK)
- Non-Stop Nonsense (UK)
- Office Gossip (Germany)
- On Becoming a God in Central Florida (US)
- Pond Life (UK)
- Question Team (UK)
- The Red Green Show (Canada)
- Rex the Runt (UK, now airs on ABC2)
- Say Aah (Holland)
- Shameless (UK)
- Shrill (US)
- Skins (UK)
- Stella Street (UK)
- That Awful Mess (UK)
- Three Ladies and Their Hot Dog Stand (Germany)
- Under One Roof (Singapore)

==== Magic ====
- The Secret Cabaret (UK)

==== Lifestyle ====
- Delia Smith's Cookery Course (UK)
- Floyd on France (UK)
- Iron Chef (Japan; SBS2)

==== Factual ====
- MythBusters (new episodes, repeat episodes shared with 7mate) (Note: MythBusters is Australian produced, but is filmed in and presented from the USA.)
- Greeks of the Sea, 19 July to 2 August 2014, the Greek's relationship with the sea
- Anatomy for Beginners (Germany)
- Queer Sports (2024)
- TV Around the World (France, 2006)

==== Reality / Variety ====
- Alone: The Skills Challenge Series (US, 2023)
- American Ninja Warrior (US, Now on 9Go!)
- Fantástico (Brazil)

==== Children's programs ====
- The Adventures of Chirpy the Sparrow (Poland)
- The Adventures of Colargol (France)
- The Adventures of Damian the Cat (UK, Czechoslovakia)
- Hergé's Adventures of Tintin (France, not to be confused with the early 90s series)
- Amigo and Friends (US, Mexico)
- Anna, Ciro and Co. (Italy)
- Apple Goes Rolling (Czechoslovakia)
- Arabela (Czechoslovakia)
- Balthazar the Centipede (France)
- The Bamboo Bears (Germany)
- Bamse (Sweden)
- Barbapapa (Netherlands)
- Basket Fever (Spain)
- Bernard Bombus (Czechoslovakia)
- The Blackbird Brothers (Czechoslovakia)
- Bolek and Lolek (Poland)
- Bojan the Bear (Yugoslavia, sometimes shares with ABC)
- The Brotherhood of the Blue Seagull (Yugoslavia)
- The Bunny with the Chequered Ears (Hungary)
- Cantinflas (Mexico)
- Chucklewood Critters (USA)
- The Clown and Valentina (Switzerland)
- The Cowherd's Flute (China)
- Creepy Crawlies (UK)
- Dali the Puppy Dog (Poland)
- Detectives on Holidays (Poland)
- Dog and Cat (Poland)
- Dogtanian and the Three Muskehounds (Spain)
- Don Quixote (Netherlands)
- The Electric Company (US, originally aired on Network Ten and ABC)
- Emily (France)
- European Folk Tales (UK)
- Everybody Here (UK)
- Fairytales from the Woods (Czechoslovakia)
- Five Water Dragons (Czechoslovakia)
- Fix & Foxi and Friends (Germany)
- Flic the Squirrel (Belgium)
- The Flute and the Bombardon (Netherlands)
- The Fruitties (Spain)
- Foxy Fables (UK)
- Garden with Statues (Greece)
- Graine D'Ortie (France)
- Granny's Little Grandson (Serbia)
- Gus and Caestar (Poland)
- Gustavus (Hungary, originally aired on ABC)
- Hang in There, Floki (Yugoslavia)
- Huskies Never Freeze (Sweden)
- The Inspector's Kids (Italy)
- Johnny the Pea (Czechoslovakia)
- Jungle Tales (Japan)
- Jungo (Denmark)
- Jurassic Cubs (Italy)
- Karino (Poland)
- Kate and Skubanek (Czechoslovakia)
- Klimbo (Canada)
- Lardock and Crunch (Czechoslovakia)
- Lapitch the Little Shoemaker (Croatia)
- Le Piaf (France)
- Legends of the World (Canada)
- Let's Laugh with the Colombaioni (Italy)
- Lilliput Put (Italy)
- The Little Poppy Man (Czechoslovakia)
- The Long White Trail (Czechoslovakia)
- The Magician's Boy (Sweden)
- Mandara (Germany)
- Marco Polo's Stone (Italy)
- Master Kristian (Czechoslovakia)
- Melita the Fibber (Yugoslavia)
- Mimosa (Finland)
- Mischief (Czechoslovakia)
- Mr. Hiccup (Italy)
- Mr. Storyteller (Greece)
- Mr. Tau (Czechoslovakia)
- The Mole (Czechoslovakia)
- The Morce Mystery (Italy)
- Murun Buchstansangur (UK)
- Muzzy in Gondoland (UK)
- My Friend Piki Jacob (Yugoslavia)
- The Mysterious Island (Czechoslovakia)
- Mystery of the Seventh Road (Netherlands)
- News from Uhlenbusch (Germany)
- No Talking About School (Czechoslovakia)
- Noah and Nelly in... SkylArk (UK, originally aired on ABC)
- Once Upon a Time... Life (France)
- Once Upon a Time... Man (France)
- Once Upon a Time... Space (France)
- Only Kaska (Poland)
- Open Book (Canada)
- Pinocchio (Italy)
- Pat and Mat (Czechoslovakia)
- Prezzemolo (Italy)
- Pulcinella (Italy)
- The Raccoons (Canada)
- The Rambles of Chubby Dumpling (Poland)
- Ravioli (Germany)
- Reksio (Poland)
- Rosalie (Poland)
- Safari (Czechoslovakia)
- Sammy the Squirrel (Hungary)
- Scruff (Spain)
- Seabert (Belgium)
- The Secret of the Old Attic (Hungary)
- The Secret World of Santa Claus (France)
- Shakespeare: The Animated Tales (UK)
- She Came Out of the Blue Sky (Czechoslovakia)
- The Sprite and the Owl (Czechoslovakia)
- Stories from Honey (UK)
- Storybook International (UK)
- Storytime (Sweden)
- Stripy (Switzerland)
- Sylvan (Spain)
- Tails the Terror of Cats (Hungary)
- Thomas and Senior (Netherlands)
- Tik Tak (Belgium)
- Tiny Tales (UK)
- Tjorven and Skrallan (Sweden)
- Treasure in Malta (Malta)
- Vagabul (France)
- Vayia's Treasure (Greece)
- VeggieTales (US)
- Victor & Maria (UK)
- Water Spider (Hungary)
- The White Stone (Sweden)
- The Woman Who Raised a Bear as Her Son (Canada, later aired on ABC)
- The World's Most Beautiful Tales (Switzerland)
- Xerxes (Sweden)
- Yakari (France)
- The Yellow Woodpecker's Ranch (Brazil)
- Zipstones (Netherlands)
- Zoom the White Dolphin (France, originally aired on ABC)

==== Sports ====
Licensed from beIN Sports:

- Soccer: UEFA Europa League (2009–2014), UEFA Champions League (1980–2018)
- Tennis: French Open (2018–2020)

Licensed from Optus Sport: (Note: Previously by Fox Sports (1993–2004).)

- Soccer: English Premier League (1993–2004, 2016–2019)

== See also ==
- List of programs broadcast by ABC (Australian TV network)
- List of programs broadcast by Network 10
- List of programs broadcast by Nine Network
- List of programs broadcast by Seven Network
- List of Australian television series
