= The Cook Up with Adam Liaw =

Australian television cooking series

- Presented by: Adam Liaw
- Country of origin: Australia
- Original language: English
- No. of seasons: 8
- No. of episodes: 710

Original release
- Network: SBS Food
- Release: 19 April 2021 – present

The Cook Up with Adam Liaw is an Australian television cooking and talk series presented by Adam Liaw. It is produced by SBS Food. It premiered on 19 April 2021.

The series sees Liaw chatting and cooking with guests including Colin Fassnidge, Julie Goodwin, Jock Zonfrillo, Yumi Stynes, Jessica Rowe and Jimmy Barnes.

== Production ==
With a 200 episode commitment for the first season, it was the largest new commission in SBS's history. The show aired its 500th episode in 2023; it is SBS's largest ever commissioned program.

Episodes are filmed ahead of broadcast, with three or four episodes shot in a day.

== Broadcast History ==
The show airs on the SBS Food Channel weeknights, at 7pm.

== See also ==
- List of Australian television series
- List of cooking shows
- List of programs broadcast by Special Broadcasting Service
