= Family Rules =

Family Rules may refer to:

- Family Rules (American TV series), a 1999 television sitcom
- Family Rules (Australian TV series), a 2017 observational documentary television series
