= The Liberation of Skopje =

The Liberation of Skopje can refer to:

- The Liberation of Skopje (1981 film), a 1981 Australian film
- The Liberation of Skopje (2016 film), a 2016 Macedonian film

== See also ==
- Stratsin-Kumanovo operation
