= Mitch McTaggart =

Australian writer and comedian

Mitch McTaggart is an Australian writer, producer and comedian.

== Career ==
In 2019, he wrote and presented comedy review programme The Last Year of Television for C31 Melbourne, which moved to SBS Viceland from 2020. While at SBS, he also wrote and produced the first series of The Back Side of Television in 2021, before both shows moved to Binge from 2022 onward. In 2023, McTaggart won an AWGIE Award for The Last Year of Television.

Through his shows, McTaggart's criticisms of Australian TV have been noted as "savage", "quick witted and incisive" while he has been described as a "kind-hearted cynic" who also "knows... how to hit a nerve". McTaggart composes theme music for his TV shows

== Selected works ==
Year	Title	Network/Platform	Notes
2019–present	The Last Year of Television	Channel 31 (2019)	6 specials Winner of 2023 AWGIE for Comedy – Sketch and Light Entertainment
2019–present	The Last Year of Television	SBS (2020-2021)	6 specials Winner of 2023 AWGIE for Comedy – Sketch and Light Entertainment
2019–present	The Last Year of Television	Binge (2022–present)	6 specials Winner of 2023 AWGIE for Comedy – Sketch and Light Entertainment
2021–present	The Back Side of Television	SBS (2021)	3 series, 14 episodes Nominated for 2022 ATOM award for Best Factual TV Series
2021–present	The Back Side of Television	Binge (2022–present)	3 series, 14 episodes Nominated for 2022 ATOM award for Best Factual TV Series
2023	WTFAQ	ABC	Guest writer/reporter
2017	Headswapsies	ABC	3 x 5 min, Fresh Blood initiative
2016	About Tonight	Channel 31	Guest host, also writer/producer
