= Chantal Contouri =

Greek-Australian actress

- Born: 8 April 1950 (age 76); Agios Georgios, Vion, Kingdom of Greece
- Occupation: Actress
- Years active: 1966–present

Chantal Contouri (Greek: Σαντάλ Κοντούρη; born 8 April 1950), sometimes credited as Chantal Cantouri, is a Greek Australian television and film actress. She has acted in many films and TV series as well as on stage, with one of her best known roles being in the 1970s soap opera Number 96 as nurse Tracy Wilson (aka "the pantyhose strangler").

== Early life and education ==
Chantal Contouri was born on 8 April 1950 in the village of Agios Georgios, Vion, in Greece, the first of five children to Fotini and Konstantinos. The family emigrated to Australia aboard the Italian ship Castel Felice in 1954, and settled in Adelaide, South Australia.

Contouri attended Adelaide High School. after leaving home she started working as a go-go dancer at a nightclub in Gawler Place in Adelaide city centre; however, she wanted to act.

She left Adelaide after being verbally abused by a Greek woman on the street, and moved to Melbourne at the age of 16.

== Professional career ==
Contouri made her professional debut as a dancer on the pop music show Kommotion in 1966. After that, she moved to London, and became good friends with Olivia Newton-John.

Contouri had leading roles in Barry McKenzie Holds His Own (1974) and the sex comedy film Alvin Purple Rides Again (1974), and later had a guest role in the Alvin Purple television series produced in 1976. She also had starring roles in horror-suspense films Thirst (1979) and Snapshot (aka The Day After Halloween) (1979). She also appeared as ‘Rosa’ in the Australian movie Is There Anybody There in late 1975.

She featured in The Sullivans (1976-1983) as Melina Tsangarakis, who married Norm Baker before her death by firing squad. Contouri appeared in US daytime soap opera General Hospital in 1988 and played a guest role in the Australian soap E Street in 1993. She featured in Timothy Spanos' series Celebrity House Cleaner playing an alcoholic acting agent and her most recent role was in a remake of Stormboy in 2019.

Contouri remains best known however as Nurse Tracey Wilson in the TV series Number 96 (1974–75). Contouri recorded an audio commentary for a 2008 DVD boxed set release of 32 Number 96 episodes, entitled The Pantyhose Strangler.

She continued working in Sydney, before moving to Los Angeles attending Olivia Newton-John's marriage to Matt Lattanzi, and there found work on the daytime soap opera General Hospital.

After moving into semi-retirement in Adelaide in 1998, she took acting roles in Hotel Mumbai (directed by Adelaide-born Greek Australian Anthony Maras) and Storm Boy, the 2019 remake with Geoffrey Rush. She also starred in the short film Unfinished Thoughts.

== Recognition and awards ==
1n 1979 Contouri won a Logie Award for Best Supporting Actress for her role as Melina Tsangarakis in The Sullivans, becoming the first Greek Australian actress to win a Logie.

In 2011 she won Best Actress in the South Australian Screen Awards for her performance in the short film Unfinished Thoughts (which was nominated for eight SASAs).

== Personal life ==
Contouri had an early marriage arranged by her parents, which broke down and she fled to her favourite uncle's house.

She spent some years in Greece in her 40s, and after a few more acting roles, semi-retired from acting in Adelaide in 1998. With her parents in failing health, she took over running their restaurant in Hindley Street, Barbecue Inn. In 2007 Contouri discussed her time Number 96 in an episode of Where Are They Now?, and talked about running the family's restaurant in Adelaide. The restaurant closed in 2014.

In 2016 Contouri was living in Torrensville, South Australia.

== Filmography ==
=== Film ===
Year	Title	Role	Type
1969	All You Have to Do is Dig	Herself - Jewellery model	Film short
1974	Alvin Rides Again	Boobs la Touche	Feature film
1974	Barry McKenzie Holds His Own	Zizi	Feature film
1977	High Rolling	Bus Hostess	Feature film
1979	Snapshot (aka The Day After Halloween)	Madeline	Feature film
1979	Thirst	Kate Davis	Feature film
1980	Touch and Go	Fiona	Feature film
1994	Metal Skin	Savina's Mother	Feature film
1996	Offspring	Rosa	Feature film
1998	Vincent's Regret	Older Rosalba	Film short
2000	Nameday		Film short
2001	And She Said...		Feature film
2003	The Wannabes	Sally	Feature film
2009	Birthday	Scarlet	Film short
2010	The Otherside	Vinchenzena	Film short
2010	Lonesdale		Film short
2011	Unfinished Thoughts	Lucia	Film short
2013	The House Cleaner	Zara Kozwalski	Feature film
2016	Allie	Mother	Film short
2018	Hotel Mumbai	Mrs Karvelas	Feature film
2019	Storm Boy	Julie Sims	Feature film

=== Television ===
Year	Title	Role	Type
1974	The Champion		Teleplay
1974	Certain Women		TV series
1974-75	Number 96	Tracey Wilson	TV series, 37 episodes
1975	Casino 10	Game hostess (with Garry Meadows)	TV series
1975	Shannon's Mob	Tara	TV series, 1 episode
1975	Silent Number	Marie	TV series, 1 episode
1975	McManus MPB	Lara Boltolavic	TV movie
1976	Alvin Purple	Christine	TV series, episode 7: 'The Hustled'
1976	Is There Anybody There?	Rosa	TV movie
1978; 1979	Chopper Squad	Diana Baker / Janie Smart	TV series, 2 episodes
1978	The Sullivans	Melina Baker	TV series, 15 episodes
1979	Doctor Down Under	Dr. Wainwright	TV series, 1 episode
1980	Skyways	Lorraine Cruickshank	TV series, 1 episode
1980	The Three Sea-Wolves	Laura Fiore	TV movie
1981	Holiday Island	Guest role: Stasia	TV series, 2 episodes
1982	The Black Boomerang aka 'Der schwarze Bumerang'	Minou	TV miniseries, 4 episodes
1983	All The Rivers Run	Julia	TV miniseries, 2 episodes
1984	Medea	Medea	TV movie
1988	General Hospital	Prunella	TV series, 12 episodes
1988	Goodbye Miss Fourth of July	Olympia Janus	TV movie
1992	Neighbours	Alexandra Lomax	TV series, 2 episodes
1992	E Street	Julia Preston	TV series, 9 episodes
2014	Wastelander Panda	Varrick	TV series, 5 episodes
2021	Aftertaste	Mama	TV series, 1 episode
2023	Celebrity House Cleaner	Zara	TV series, 4 episodes

=== As self ===
Year	Title	Role	Type
1966	Kommotion	Herself - Go-go dancer	TV series
1974	Behind the Scenes of Barry McKenzie Holds His Own	Herself / Zizi	TV special
1975	Celebrity Squares	Panelist	TV series, 1 episode
1977	Telethon: First Hour	Guest - Herself	TV special
1977	Greek Affair	Herself	TV series
1977	Graham Kennedy's Blankety Blanks	Panelist	TV series, 2 episodes
1978; 1979; 1983; 1984	The Mike Walsh Show	Guest - Herself	TV series, 4 episodes
1979	21st Annual Logie Awards	Herself	TV special
1979	Sammy Awards 1979	Compere	TV special
1980	Parkinson in Australia	Guest	TV series, 1 episode
1980	The Variety Club Race Day	Herself	TV special
1980	1980 Australian Film Awards	Presenter	TV special
1980	Who Are We?	Herself	TV documentary
1981	Play Bouzouki	Host	TV special
1982; 1983	The Daryl Somers Show	Guest	TV series, 2 episodes
1989	The Home Show	Guest	TV series, 1 episode
1989	International It's a Knockout	Contestant	TV special
1991	The Midday Show	Guest	TV series, 1 episode
1991; 1992	Tonight Live with Steve Vizard	Guest	TV series, 2 episodes
1991	Celebrity Wheel Of Fortune	Contestant	TV series, 1 episode
1991	Celebrity Family Feud	Contestant	TV series, 1 episode
1991	The World Tonight	Guest	TV series, 1 episode
1991	Team Family Feud	Contestant	TV series, 1 episode
1992	The Morning Show	Presenter	TV series
1993-1999	Good Morning Australia	Guest	TV series, 7 episodes
1993	Insiders	Herself	TV series, 1 episode
1994	Chantal Contouri Inside Hollywood	Herself	TV special
1994	This Is Your Life	Guest	TV series, 1 episode: 'Olivia Newton-John'
1995	At Home	Guest	TV series, 1 episode
1998	Denise	Guest	TV series, 1 episode
1999	Beauty and the Beast	Guest	TV series, 3 episodes
2003	George Negus Tonight	Guest	TV series, 1 episode
2007	Where Are They Now?	Guest (with Number 96 cast – Joe Hasham, Chard Hayward, Elaine Lee, Jeff Kevin, Sheila Kennelly & Frances Hargreaves)	TV series, 1 episode
2009	The Cook and the Chef	Guest	TV series, 1 episode
2012	Myf Warhurst's Nice	Guest	TV series, 1 episode
2014	When the Beatles Drove us Wild	Herself	TV special

== Stage ==
Contouri has had many stage roles, including:

Year	Title	Role	Theatre Co. / Location
1976	Snap!		Independent Theatre, Sydney
1983	The Portage to San Cristobal of A.H.		
1983	Medea	Medea	Fairfield Amphitheatre, Sydney
1984	The Shifting Heart		Phillip Street Theatre, Sydney
1986	In the Boom Boom Room		Beverly Hills Playhouse
	Lunch Girls		Los Angeles Theatre Center
	Cat on a Hot Tin Roof		Beverly Hills Playhouse
1992	The Bacchae		
1995	To Traverse Water		Shed 14, Docklands, Melbourne with IHOS Opera for Melbourne International Arts Festival
1996, 1999	Emma Celebrazione!	Concetta Coccolosto	Malthouse Theatre, Melbourne with Playbox Theatre Company & STCSA
1996	Milk and Honey	Mother	La Boite Theatre, Brisbane
1997	Life Goes On		
1999	Courtyard of Miracles	Asta	Playhouse, Adelaide with STCSA
1999	The Rose Tattoo	Assunta	with STCSA
