= Tomorrow Tonight (TV series) =

- Genre: Comedy, news satire, panel show
- Created by: Chris Walker; Charlie Pickering; Kevin Whyte
- Presented by: Charlie Pickering; Annabel Crabb; Adam Liaw (2022-present)
- Country of origin: Australia
- Original language: English
- No. of seasons: 2
- No. of episodes: 16

Production
- Running time: 30 minutes

Original release
- Network: ABC
- Release: 31 October 2018 – present

Tomorrow Tonight is an Australian comedy panel discussion television show hosted by Annabel Crabb, Charlie Pickering, and Adam Liaw. The show features a panel of experts and comedians who discuss a hypothetical news story from the following day's headlines.

== History ==
The show premiered on ABC in October 2018, with Crabb and Pickering as co-hosts. After a three-year absence, it was scheduled to return in 2022, but disruptions caused by ongoing COVID-19 restrictions delayed its return to the following year.

Adam Liaw joined the cast in 2022.

== Synopsis ==
The show features a panel of experts and comedians who discuss a hypothetical news story from tomorrow's headlines. Together they try to solve the world's problems before they even happen.

== Format ==
The show airs several segments throughout the episode to create a hypothetical or fake news story, and in the process raises moral dilemmas that are fictional yet convincing. The hypothetical news story is shown to three guest panellists and permanent panellist Annabel Crabb. The host (Charlie Pickering) holds a neutral position and questions each panellist as to how they will approach the issues raised. The news story gradually unfolds in various segments during the episode and culminates in a humorous potential aftermath featuring one of the guest panellists.

== Episodes ==
=== Season 1 (2018) ===
No. overall	No. in season	Topic	Panel Guests	Original release date	Viewers
1	1	"The Hack"	Julie Bishop, cybersecurity expert Richard Buckland, Luke McGregor	31 October 2018	600,000
Scenario: A hacker accesses a U.S. intelligence database, stealing every mobile phone text message from around the world dating back to 2001 and will publicly release your text messages unless you send $5,000 to keep them secret.
2	2	"The Perfect Baby"	Nazeem Hussain, athlete Meredith Young, ethicist Julian Savulescu	7 November 2018	567,000
Scenario: Revolutionary gene editing technology called PINCR creates the world's first designer baby named Adam and this technology has applications including curing genetic diseases and choosing your baby's gender, hair colour or eye colour.
3	3	"The Last Drop"	Jay Weatherill, cattle farmer Su McCluskey, Denise Scott	14 November 2018	506,000
Scenario: Australia is running out of water and the Department of Water Security is publicly naming and shaming households that use too much water, while violations of water restrictions is punishable with up to 3 months in prison.
4	4	"The Bonobo"	Dave Hughes, Adam Liaw, Chris Brown	21 November 2018	457,000
Scenario: Babel is a much loved and highly intelligent female bonobo in an Australian zoo who uses sign language to communicate but a zookeeper deliberately poisons her and receives two years imprisonment for her death compared to seven years for killing a human.
5	5	"The App"	AI expert Toby Walsh, film-maker Santilla Chingaipe, Nath Valvo	28 November 2018	442,000
Scenario: An Australian tech guru creates a dating app called DataDate that uses an artificial intelligence algorithm to access details from all your online activities, DNA and personality tests to build your complete profile in order to match you with your 'optimal partner'.
6	6	"The Driverless Car"	Inventor Jordan Nguyen, Kate Peck, Merrick Watts	5 December 2018	441,000
Scenario: Australia's technology in driverless cars can quickly calculate the fastest route to your destination, has features including GPS, sensors and a safety algorithm which makes an immediate decision to minimise the loss of human lives.
7	7	"The Dynasty"	Hugh Riminton, Joe Wong, Anna Broinowski	12 December 2018	434,000
Scenario: Mystery surrounds the whereabouts of North Korea's leader Kim Jong-un and his younger sister Kim Yo-jong who are missing and presumed dead, with thousands of North Korean civilians crossing the border into South Korea and occupying the demilitarised zone.
8	8	"The Vice Card"	Greig Pickhaver, ethicist Leslie Cannold, Celia Pacquola	19 December 2018	417,000
Scenario: Australia's health card caps your sugar intake at the World Health Organisation's recommended limit of 25 grams per day to reduce obesity rates and cardiovascular diseases by stopping you from making further purchases of processed snack food and soft drinks at the checkout when you reach the limit.

=== Season 2 (2022) ===
No. overall	No. in season	Topic	Panel Guests	Original release date	Viewers
9	1	"Deepfakes"	Hamish Blake, Yumi Stynes	30 March 2022	N/A
Scenario: When our eyes and our ears can be fooled, what do we have left? We ask them to step into a world where deepfakes are indistinguishable from reality.
10	2	"Social Credits"	Tom Gleeson, author Dee Madigan	6 April 2022	N/A
Scenario: Would you give up the right to be bad? We negotiate a world where our behaviour isn't just rewarded and punished, being good is a compulsory national policy.
11	3	"Ectogenesis"	Jane Caro, author Zoë Norton Lodge	13 April 2022	N/A
Scenario: What if childbirth was a thing of the past? We're find out to ponder a future where babies could grow outside the human body.
12	4	"Living Longer"	Jean Kittson, Peter Helliar	20 April 2022	N/A
Scenario: Is a longer life a better life? We ask the experts to wrestle with a world where humans could live to the ripe young age of 150.
13	5	"Beliefs"	Waleed Aly, Narelda Jacobs	27 April 2022	N/A
Scenario: Do we all need to believe in something, whether it's true or not? We talk about them to step into a world where one belief becomes a reality.
14	6	"Cheating"	Christopher Pyne, Sarah Harris	4 May 2022	N/A
Scenario: Why do we assume life should be fair? We ask the panel to navigate a playing field where cheating is not just allowed but embraced.
15	7	"Memory"	Author Jamila Rizvi, Dave O'Neil	11 May 2022	N/A
Scenario: What would you give up to forget your trauma? We ask themselves to step into a world where our memories can be shuffled, dismantled and even erased.
16	8	"Living"	Geraldine Hickey, Anthony 'Lehmo' Lehmann	18 May 2022	N/A
Scenario: Would the world be better or worse without fibs and fabrication? We ask the team to step into a world where telling the truth isn't just necessary, it's compulsory.

== See also ==
- The Project (Australian TV program)
