= Food Safari =

- Genre: Documentary, food
- Created by: Kismet Productions
- Developed by: Maeve O'Meara; Toufic Charabati
- Presented by: Maeve O'Meara
- Starring: Maeve O'Meara
- Country of origin: Australia
- Original language: English
- No. of seasons: Main series: 6; Spin-off series: 2
- No. of episodes: Main series: 80; Spin-off series: 22

Production
- Producers: Maeve O'Meara; Toufic Charabati
- Running time: 25 minutes
- Production company: Kismet Productions

Original release
- Network: SBS TV
- Release: 1 June 2006 – present

Food Safari is an Australian television food series presented by Maeve O'Meara and produced by Kismet Productions in association with SBS TV Australia, and explores the cuisines brought to Australia by its immigrants. From seasons 1 to 4, each episode covered a cuisine from a particular culture, including commonly used ingredients and where to obtain them in Australia, the preparation and consumption of 'popular favourites', basic dishes and desserts/sweets. Seasons five to seven, whilst still covering Australian cuisine, focused on the basic elements involved in food preparation, with Food Safari Fire consisting of barbecuing, grilling and smoking of meat and vegetables, Food Safari Earth consisting of vegetarian dishes and focusing on European fermentation and preservation of vegetables, and Food Safari Water which focused on seafood.

The series garnered two spin-off seasons, Italian Food Safari and French Food Safari, which first aired in 2010 and 2011, respectively. In both seasons, O'Meara is joined by a chef experienced in the food of that culture, with Guy Grossi co-presenting in Italian Food Safari and french-born Australian chef, Guillaume Brahimi sharing the presenting duties in French Food Safari.

Food Safari was commissioned for a fourth series which began on February 14, 2013. An episode featuring bush tucker went to air on 4 March 2013. A fifth season began airing from January 7, 2016. A sixth season began airing from October 12, 2017.

== Series overview ==
Series	Title	Episodes	Originally released		Average viewers
Series	Title	Episodes	First released	Last released	Average viewers
1	Series 1	13	6 December 2006	28 February 2007	281,000
2	Series 2	12	5 December 2007	20 February 2008	359,000
3	Series 3	9	3 December 2008	4 February 2009	379,000
S	Italian	13	18 March 2010	10 June 2010	TBA
S	French	9	23 June 2011	18 August 2011	TBA
4	Series 4	10	14 February 2013	18 April 2013	453,000
5	Fire	10	7 January 2016	10 March 2016	400,000
6	Earth	13	12 October 2017	4 January 2018	257,667
7	Water	13	1 August 2018	14 November 2018	154,910

== Episodes ==
=== Series 1 (2006-07) ===
No. overall	No. in season	Title	Original release date
1	1	"Moroccan"	6 December 2006
2	2	"Malaysian"	13 December 2006
3	3	"Portuguese"	20 December 2006
4	4	"Greek"	27 December 2006
5	5	"Vietnamese"	3 January 2007
6	6	"Indian"	10 January 2007
7	7	"Chinese"	17 January 2007
8	8	"Italian"	24 January 2007
9	9	"Thai"	31 January 2007
10	10	"Lebanese"	7 February 2007
11	11	"Mexican"	14 February 2007
12	12	"Turkish"	21 February 2007
13	13	"Spanish"	28 February 2007

=== Series 2 (2007-08) ===
No. overall	No. in season	Title	Original release date
14	1	"Japanese"	5 December 2007
15	2	"French"	12 December 2007
16	3	"Indonesian"	19 December 2007
17	4	"Maltese"	26 December 2007
18	5	"Pakistani"	2 January 2008
19	6	"Croatian"	9 January 2008
20	7	"Singaporean"	16 January 2008
21	8	"Hungarian"	23 January 2008
22	9	"Sri Lankan"	30 January 2008
23	10	"Brazilian"	6 February 2008
24	11	"Korean"	13 February 2008
25	12	"Mauritian"	20 February 2008

=== Series 3 (2008-09) ===
No. overall	No. in season	Title	Original release date	Aus viewers (millions)
26	1	"South American"	3 December 2008	
27	2	"Egyptian"	10 December 2008	
28	3	"German"	17 December 2008	
29	4	"Persian"	24 December 2008	
30	5	"English"	7 January 2009	513,000
31	6	"African"	14 January 2009	409,000
32	7	"Syrian"	21 January 2009	
33	8	"American"	28 January 2009	448,000
34	9	"Jewish"	4 February 2009	

=== Series 4 (2013) ===
No. overall	No. in season	Title	Original release date	Aus viewers (millions)
35	1	"Darwin"	14 February 2013	238,000
36	2	"Peruvian"	21 February 2013	221,000
37	3	"Cypriot"	28 February 2013	270,000
38	4	"Filipino"	7 March 2013	244,000
39	5	"South African"	14 March 2013	244,000
40	6	"Laotian"	21 March 2013	273,000
41	7	"Polish"	28 March 2013	N/A
42	8	"Afghan"	4 April 2013	N/A
43	9	"Danish"	11 April 2013	356,000
44	10	"Broome"	18 April 2013	384,000

=== Fire: Series 5 (2016) ===
No. overall	No. in season	Title	Original release date	Aus viewers (millions)
45	1	"Cooking with Fire"	7 January 2016	263,000
46	2	"Street Food"	14 January 2016	240,000
47	3	"The Wood-fired Oven"	21 January 2016	299,000
48	4	"Grilling Passionate"	28 January 2016	293,000
49	5	"The Tandoor"	4 February 2016	314,000
50	6	"Spit-roasting"	11 February 2016	314,000
51	7	"Pots and Pans"	18 February 2016	302,000
52	8	"Asian Barbecue"	25 February 2016	300,000
53	9	"Smoking"	3 March 2016	241,000
54	10	"Barbecue Safari"	10 March 2016	258,000

=== Earth: Series 6 (2017) ===
No. overall	No. in season	Title	Original release date	Aus viewers (millions)
55	1	"The New Green"	12 October 2017	244,000
56	2	"Staples"	19 October 2017	256,000
57	3	"Spring"	26 October 2017	248,000
58	4	"Legumes"	2 November 2017	271,000
59	5	"Herbs and Spices"	9 November 2017	249,000
60	6	"Summer"	16 November 2017	282,000
61	7	"Flowers"	23 November 2017	239,000
62	8	"Stuffed, Rolled and Wrapped"	30 December 2017	269,000
63	9	"Tropic and Exotic"	7 December 2017	261,000
64	10	"Autumn"	14 December 2017	N/A
65	11	"Sweet and Sour"	21 December 2017	N/A
66	12	"Preserving and Fermenting"	28 December 2017	N/A
67	13	"Winter"	4 January 2018	N/A

=== Water: Series 7 (2018) ===
No. overall	No. in season	Title	Original release date	Aus viewers (millions)
68	1	"From the Water"	1 August 2018	172,000
69	2	"Sea Treasures"	8 August 2018	170,000
70	3	"Whole Fish"	15 August 2018	N/A
71	4	"Raw"	22 August 2018	118,000
72	5	"Fish Bites"	19 September 2018	143,000
73	6	"Fish on Fire"	26 September 2018	153,000
74	7	"Shellfish"	3 October 2018	139,000
75	8	"One Pot"	10 October 2018	163,000
76	9	"Preserved"	17 October 2018	155,000
77	10	"Surf and Turf"	24 October 2018	124,000
78	11	"Freshwater"	31 October 2018	185,000
79	12	"Feel Good Fish"	7 November 2018	182,000
80	13	"Festive Fish"	26 December 2018	N/A

== Spin-off series ==
=== Italian Food Safari (2010) ===
No. overall	No. in season	Title	Original release date
1	1	"Episode 1"	18 March 2010
2	2	"Episode 2"	25 March 2010
3	3	"Episode 3"	1 April 2010
4	4	"Episode 4"	8 April 2010
5	5	"Episode 5"	15 April 2010
6	6	"Episode 6"	22 April 2010
7	7	"Episode 7"	29 April 2010
8	8	"Episode 8"	6 May 2010
9	9	"Episode 9"	13 May 2010
10	10	"Episode 10"	20 May 2010
11	11	"Episode 11"	27 May 2010
12	12	"Episode 12"	3 June 2010
13	13	"Episode 13"	10 June 2010

=== French Food Safari (2011) ===
No. overall	No. in season	Title	Original release date
1	14	"Episode 1"	23 June 2011
2	15	"Episode 2"	30 June 2011
3	16	"Episode 3"	7 July 2011
4	17	"Episode 4"	14 July 2011
5	18	"Episode 5"	21 July 2011
6	19	"Episode 6"	28 July 2011
7	20	"Episode 7"	4 August 2011
8	21	"Episode 8"	11 August 2011
9	22	"Episode 9"	18 August 2011

== Home media ==
Title	DVD release dates				Special features
Title	Region 1	Region 2	Region 4		Special features
Title	Region 1	Region 2	Australia	New Zealand	Special features
Food Safari	—N/a	—N/a	6 June 2007	11 July 2007	
Food Safari 2	—N/a	—N/a	21 February 2008	20 March 2008	
Food Safari 3	—N/a	—N/a	18 March 2009	—N/a	
Italian Food Safari	—N/a	—N/a	2 June 2010	—N/a	160 minutes of bonus material.
French Food Safari	—N/a	—N/a	3 August 2011	—N/a	90 minutes of bonus material.
Food Safari 4	—N/a	—N/a	6 March 2013	11 April 2013	
Food Safari Fire	—N/a	—N/a	3 February 2016	10 March 2016	
Food Safari Earth	—N/a	—N/a	19 December 2018	10 January 2019	
Food Safari Water	—N/a	—N/a	19 December 2018	10 January 2019	
Food Safari Elements: Earth, Water & Fire	—N/a	—N/a	20 March 2019	—N/a	

== See also ==
- List of Australian television series
- List of cooking shows
- List of programs broadcast by Special Broadcasting Service
