= Food Lovers' Guide to Australia =

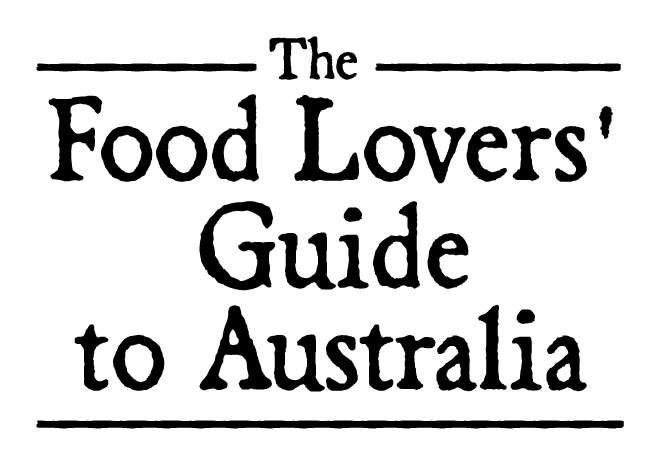
- Genre: Documentary, food
- Created by: SBS TV
- Based on: The Sydney Morning Herald Good Food Guide
- Presented by: Maeve O'Meara; Joanna Savill; Tony Tan
- Country of origin: Australia
- Original language: English
- No. of seasons: 5
- No. of episodes: 70

Production
- Executive producers: Margaret Murphy; Giampaolo Pertosi; Toufic Charabati
- Producers: Maeve O'Meara; Joanna Savill; Jacqui Sykes; Susan Wallace
- Running time: 30 minutes

Original release
- Network: SBS TV
- Release: 21 December 1996 – 14 December 2005

Related
- Wine Lovers' Guide to Australia

The Food Lovers' Guide to Australia is an Australian food and travel television show presented by Maeve O'Meara and Joanna Savill and produced and broadcast by SBS. In the series, O'Meara and Savill travel across Australia, discovering the country's multicultural culinary delights and showcasing the talents of home cooks and professional chefs. The series first aired on 21 December 1996, and ran for five seasons, with the fifth season premiering on 14 September 2005. The series has won numerous awards, including the World Food Media Award for Best Food/Drink TV show in 2005; and a plethora of Australian food broadcasting awards.

== Series overview ==
Series	Timeslot	Episodes	Originally released	
Series	Timeslot	Episodes	First released	Last released
1	—N/a	18	21 December 1996	—N/a
2	—N/a	13	1999	—N/a
3	—N/a	13	2 August 2002	—N/a
4	Wednesday 7:30pm	13	16 June 2004	—N/a
5	Wednesday 7:30pm	13	14 September 2005	21 December 2005

== See also ==
- List of Australian television series
- List of cooking shows
- List of programs broadcast by Special Broadcasting Service
