= McManus MPB =

- Written by: Robert Caswell
- Directed by: Max Varnel
- Starring: Peter Sumner; Arna-Marie Winchester; Chantal Contouri; Pamela Stephenson; Peter Gwynne
- Country of origin: Australia
- Original language: English

Production
- Editor: Ron Williams
- Running time: 90 mins
- Production company: Cash Harmon Television

Original release
- Network: Network Ten
- Release: 1976

McManus MPB is a 1976 Australian television film which was the pilot for a TV series.

== Plot ==
The daughter of the Russian Consul vanishes. Sergeant McManus of the Missing Persons Bureau is sent to find her.

== Cast ==
- Peter Sumner as Sergeant McManus
- Arna-Marie Winchester
- Chantal Contouri as Lara Boltolavic
- Pamela Stephenson as Kylie Charles
- Peter Gwynne as Sergeant Salisbury
- Brian Moll as Carl Day
- Serge Lazareff as Mr Charles
