= Black Convicts =

2024 book by Santilla Chingaipe

- Author: Santilla Chingaipe
- Genre: Non-fiction
- Publisher: Simon & Schuster
- Publication date: 30 October 2024
- Publication place: Australia
- Media type: Print
- Pages: 320
- ISBN: 9781761107238

Black Convicts: How Slavery Shaped Australia is a 2024 non-fiction book by Santilla Chingaipe. The book recounts the lives of Black people who were transported to Australia as convicts between 1788 and 1840. Chingaipe's research identified around five hundred convicts of African descent, and argues that Australia's history is more closely tied to the Atlantic slave trade than is typically acknowledged.

== Reception ==
In Australian Book Review, Seumas Spark praised Chingaipe for unearthing an important part of Australian history, but criticised the book for being "heavy on generalisation and cavalier in its disregard of context", with "some claims both careless and too neat". He ultimately concluded that these flaws were "more distractions than insuperable hurdles, thanks to the power and significance of the Black histories that Chingaipe has uncovered". Jane Lydon gave a similarly mixed review in The Conversation, praising the power of Chingaipe's narrative but writing that she had a tendency to "overlook or deny existing scholarship, with some ill effects". In a review for The Australian, Tom Gilling wrote that the book "succeeds admirably" at making the presence of Black convicts in Australia known, but that "its polemic feels a bit overblown".

Blck Convicts received a more positive review in Meanjin magazine, where Clare Millar described it as "a work of global significance". Roger Sawkins concluded his review in Quaker magazine The Friend by characterizing the book as "a profound eye-opener, and a remarkable documentation of a hidden part of our British and Australian history." In shortlisting it for the Stella Prize, the judging panel wrote that Black Convicts "represents a substantial intervention in our understanding of the convict archive and offers a new understanding of Australia’s participation in slavery since colonisation."

== Awards ==
Awards for Black Convicts
Year	Award	Category	Result	Ref.
2025	Stella Prize	—	Shortlisted	
