= Cycling Central =

- Starring: TBA
- Country of origin: Australia

Production
- Running time: 60 minutes

Original release
- Network: SBS One
- Release: 2003 – present

Cycling Central is an Australian sports program, that talks about the various cycling competitions in Australia and around the world. It is the only free-to-air program in Australia that is dedicated to the sport.

== Broadcast history ==
The first series began in 2003 over 13 weeks, as a magazine-style program, continuing until 2007 when it was axed. The show returned to a one-hour format on 1 August 2010 and has screened every week for 52 weeks of the year ever since. Taking the show on the road is not uncommon. Cycling Central has been screened live on location at the Tour Down Under, the Jayco Herald-Sun Tour, the Cycling Australia Road National Championships from Ballarat and the UCI Track Cycling World Championships held in Melbourne in April 2012.

It currently airs on SBS One on Sunday afternoons at 5pm, and runs for an hour.

== Presenter ==
Since the start, it had been hosted by Mike Tomalaris, but since Mike left SBS in 2022, a replacement has yet to be advised.

== See also ==
- List of Australian television series
- List of programs broadcast by Special Broadcasting Service
- List of longest-running Australian television series
