= Adam Liaw =

Australian cook (born 1978)

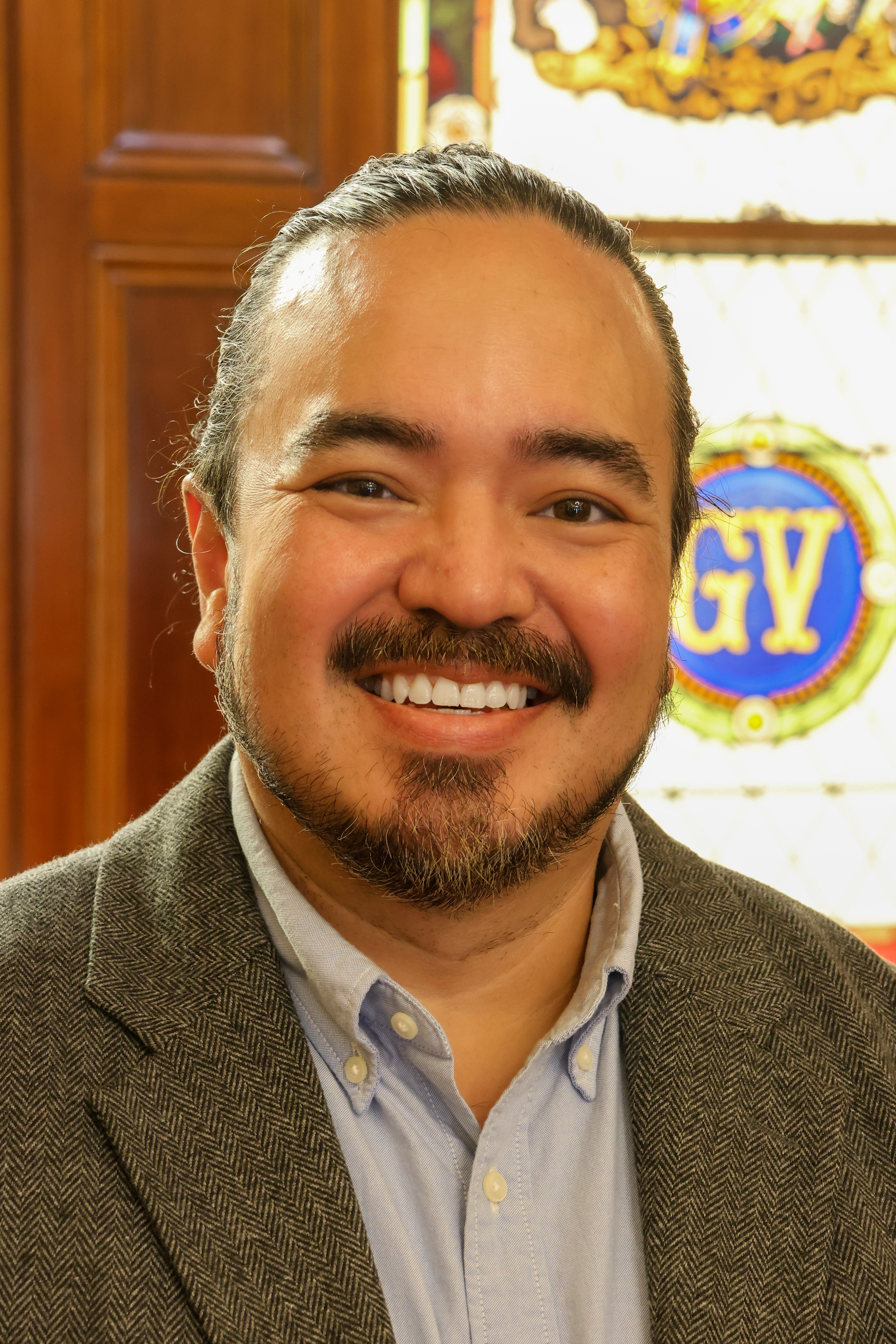
- Liaw in 2026
- Born: 8 September 1978 (age 48); Penang, Malaysia
- Education: Bachelor of Science (Pharmacology), Bachelor of Law
- Alma mater: University of Adelaide, Prince Alfred College
- Occupations: Cook; television presenter; producer; author
- Predecessor: Julie Goodwin
- Successor: Kate Bracks
- Spouse: Asami Fujitsuka
- Children: 3
- Awards: Winner, MasterChef Australia
- Website: adamliaw.com

Adam Liaw (Chinese: 廖崇明; pinyin: Liào Chóngmíng; born 8 September 1978) is an Australian cook, television presenter and author. He was the winner of the second season of MasterChef Australia, defeating student Callum Hann in the final. Liaw has produced, written and hosted his own cooking programs, including the Destination Flavour series and the talk and cooking show The Cook Up with Adam Liaw on SBS Food.

== Early life ==
Liaw was born in Penang, Malaysia, to a Malaysian Chinese father, Dr Siaw-Lin Liaw, and a Singaporean-born English mother, Dr Joyce Hill AM. He is the second of three children, with an older brother and younger sister. His family moved to Adelaide when Liaw was age 3. After his parents divorced and his mother moved to New Zealand, Liaw lived with his paternal grandmother whom he credits with a huge influence on his cooking and his life.

Liaw completed Year 11 at Prince Alfred College at age 14 and enrolled in university at 16. He graduated with a double degree in Science and Law from the University of Adelaide at 21.

After graduation, Liaw was employed by Kelly & Co Lawyers in Adelaide where he worked in technology, commercial/corporate law, business advisory and international trade. He was also a committee member, legal adviser and secretary of the Hong Kong Australia Business Association, assisting South Australian companies to expand their business into Hong Kong and mainland China. In 2004, Liaw moved to Japan where he worked in media law for The Walt Disney Company.

== MasterChef Australia ==
On 29 September 2009, Liaw announced via Twitter that he was considering auditioning for the second season of MasterChef Australia. In April 2010, he was announced as one of the top 24 finalists. Despite winning a challenge cooking the dishes of celebrity chefs, Liaw doubted he had sufficient technique to win the title.

On 22 July 2010, Liaw was the first challenger awarded a place in the grand finale. On 25 July 2010, he was declared the winner of the second season of MasterChef Australia, defeating Callum Hann 89–82 for the title in the final. His victory is still the most watched non-sporting television event in Australian history.

After winning the show, Liaw considered a number of opportunities, including opening an izakaya restaurant with Tokyo-based Australian chef and friend Matthew Crabbe. He returned to MasterChef Australia as a guest judge for season 4 and season 6.

== Books and writing ==
As the winner of season 2 of MasterChef Australia, Liaw was given the opportunity to write his own cookbook. The book is called Two Asian Kitchens (ISBN 9781864711356), and was published by Random House Australia in April 2011. Split into two main sections - the Old Kitchen and the New Kitchen - Liaw explores recipes that he has grown up with, along with new creations. The book has received positive reviews in the Australian media.

Liaw has since published more cookbooks including Asian After Work (2013), Adam's Big Pot (2014), Asian Cookery School (2015) and The Zen Kitchen (2016). He also writes for Fairfax newspapers' Good Food, Sunday Life magazine and The Guardian. He used to write for The Wall Street Journal's Scene Asia.

== Television ==
On 14 March 2012, it was announced that Liaw will host his own travel/food TV show, Destination Flavour, which premiered on the SBS network in August 2012. The series was also co-hosted by Renee Lim and Lily Serna. In September 2013, Destination Flavour: Japan premiered on SBS One with Liaw as the sole host; the series was followed by Destination Flavour: Down Under in September 2014. Destination Flavour: Scandinavia premiered on SBS in 2016, with Destination Flavour: Singapore premiering in January 2017 and Destination Flavour: China in November 2018.

In March 2017, Hidden Japan with Adam Liaw premiered on SBS Food. In 2019, he appeared on the seventh season finale of Julia Zemiro's Home Delivery. In late 2020, Liaw hosted Adam Liaw's Road Trip for Good for SBS Food.

In April 2021, Liaw started hosting a nightly talk and cooking show on SBS Food titled The Cook Up with Adam Liaw. With a 200 episode first season commitment, it was largest commission in SBS's history. The series sees Liaw chatting and cooking with guests including Colin Fassnidge, Julie Goodwin, Jock Zonfrillo, Yumi Stynes, Jessica Rowe and Jimmy Barnes. In October 2021, Liaw teamed up with season one MasterChef Australia runner-up Poh Ling Yeow to present Adam and Poh’s Malaysia in Australia, which explored their shared Malaysian heritage.

In 2022, Liaw joined the ABC panel show Tomorrow Tonight.

== Other ==
Liaw is UNICEF Australia's National Ambassador for Nutrition. In 2016, he was appointed by the Japanese government as a Goodwill Ambassador of Japanese Cuisine. He is also on the board of the Australia-Japan Foundation.

Liaw is prolific on social media. In 2015, BuzzFeed Australia highlighted '19 Reasons You Need to Follow Aussie Chef Adam Liaw on Twitter and Instagram', and '17 Times Aussie Chef Adam Liaw Nailed It on Social Media in 2015'.

In 2017, Liaw was named by All Nippon Airways as the Culinary Ambassador for ANA Australia, and created two seasonal menus for the airline.

In May 2022, Liaw launched a seven-part podcast series on Audible called How Taste Changed the World.

== Filmography ==
Title	Year	Role
MasterChef Australia	2010	Contestant
Everyday Gourmet with Justine Schofield	2012	Guest
Destination Flavour	2012	Host
Destination Flavour: Japan	2013	Host, developer and writer
Destination Flavour: Down Under	2014	Host
Destination Flavour: Christmas	2014	Host
One Plus One	2016	Guest
Destination Flavour: Scandinavia	2016	Host
Destination Flavour: Singapore	2017	Host
Hidden Japan with Adam Liaw	2017	Host
Play School	2017	Guest
Makers Who Inspire	2018	Guest
Destination Flavour: China	2018	Host
Julia Zemiro's Home Delivery	2019	Guest
Dateline	2019	Guest
Life Drawing Life	2020	Guest
Adam Liaw's Road Trip for Good	2020	Host, executive producer and writer
Adam and Poh's Malaysia in Australia	2021	Co-host, executive producer and writer
The Cook Up with Adam Liaw	2021–present	Host
Tomorrow Tonight	2022	Panellist
ABC 90 Celebrate!	2022	Guest
Dishing It Up	2022	Guest

Preceded by Julie Goodwin	MasterChef Australia; Winner; 2010	Succeeded by Kate Bracks
