= The Last Year of Television =

- 2024 title card
- Genre: Comedy documentary; Television review; Satire
- Written by: Mitch McTaggart
- Directed by: Ryan Thomas
- Presented by: Mitch McTaggart
- Country of origin: Australia
- No. of episodes: 6 (+1 pilot)

Production
- Producers: Mitch McTaggart; James Westland
- Running time: 45-68 minutes
- Production company: Doug Watched Half

Original release
- Network: SBS Viceland / SBS
- Release: 23 December 2020 – 1 January 2022
- Network: Binge
- Release: 28 December 2023 – present

Related
- The Back Side of Television

The Last Year of Television is an end-of-year comedy review programme covering Australian TV, created and presented by Mitch McTaggart. It was first broadcast nationally on SBS Viceland in 2020.

== Origin ==
An initial special was created for community television station C31 Melbourne in 2019, which McTaggart described as "a test run" and "a pilot" to pitch to SBS.

Regarding the concept, McTaggart explained to The West Australian that despite existing review programmes such as The Weekly or Shaun Micallef's Mad as Hell, "no one really bothers [to cover] Australian TV, which is fairly... disappointing."

In an interview with SBS, McTaggart said that world events and politics were "well and truly mined by all those other shows", and so he instead wanted to "lean into the more niche moments" of Australian television.

== Format ==
The Last Year of Television provides a month-by-month recap of the highs and lows of specifically Australian television from the past year. The commentary is often crass and "snarky" to illustrate points.

Each special is broken up with occasional long-form segments, such as detailed analyses of how news can create large-scale outrage, or discussions of how television can exploit an event or single person in the pursuit of ratings.

McTaggart often draws from Australian TV history to make observations and comparisons with current programming.

== Production ==
McTaggart writes the show and watches Australian television throughout the year to collect clips, explaining in 2022: "I usually write a few notes when a moment happens, then flesh it out later depending on runtime. Some stuff gets the chop later in relation to the other content – [for instance] if there’s too many downer stories, or too many consecutive critiques of a single network."

Some topics become running jokes. Beginning in 2020, McTaggart talked about how Channel Seven sitcom Fam Time had yet to air, despite being shot in 2019. This was mentioned in every subsequent special until Seven finally released the series in 2024, where it was reviewed in that year's show.

After the 2020 special, SBS also broadcast the companion series The Back Side of Television in 2021, containing a wider scope without the limitations of a year-in-review format. Both shows then migrated to streaming platform Binge in 2022.

== Series overview ==
The first SBS special aired in 2020. For the 2022 special onward, it was released on Binge.

In June 2024, it was renewed for a 2025 special.

Episode	Special	Original release	Network
Pilot	2019	31 December 2019	C31
1	2020	23 December 2020	SBS Viceland / SBS
2	2021	1 January 2022	SBS Viceland / SBS
3	2022	31 December 2022	Binge
4	2023	28 December 2023	Binge
5	2024	30 December 2024	Binge
6	2025	29 December 2025	Binge

== Episodes ==
No.	Title	Written by	Original release date
1	"2020 Special"	Mitch McTaggart	23 December 2020
McTaggart recaps Home and Away seemingly censoring a lesbian kiss; A Current Affair addresses its role in the downfall of Hey Dad..! actor Robert Hughes; and a summary of how Australian TV responded to the outbreak of COVID-19. Also, Neighbours' 35th Anniversary week; a series of ill-judged interviews on Today; and the realities of on-screen diversity. Program reviews include: The Gloaming, Pooch Perfect, Informer 3838, Between Two Worlds, Halifax: Retribution
2	"2021 Special"	Mitch McTaggart	1 January 2022
McTaggart discusses the ACMA findings of the 'stolen generation' segment on Sunrise and the program's subsequent apology; the behind the scenes mishaps on Holey Moley; and the television fallout of the Collingwood Football Club racism scandal, particularly Heritier Lumumba's treatment during a 2017 interview on The Project. Also, Craig McLachlan's tell-all interview on 7News Spotlight. Program reviews include: Aftertaste, Eden, Jack Irish, RFDS, The Newsreader
3	"2022 Special"	Mitch McTaggart	31 December 2022
McTaggart recaps Wayne Carey's appearance on SAS Australia, Scott Morrison's puff piece on 60 Minutes, and the insensitivity surrounding the production of Underbelly: Vanishing Act. Also a look at the ABC's 90th anniversary, the suspicious timeline of the cancellation and renewal of Neighbours, and dramatisations of mass-casualty events with Bali 2002. Program reviews include: Troppo, Barons, Byron Baes, Hunted, Heartbreak Island Australia, Mystery Road: Origin
4	"2023 Special"	Mitch McTaggart	28 December 2023
McTaggart looks at how Australian TV dealt with the Sea World helicopter crash; the fallout of one joke made by Reuben Kaye on an episode of The Project; and King Charles' coronation. Also a deep dive into how most Australian telemovie biopics are largely the same; The Voice referendum; and a rebuttal to a 7News Spotlight programme about gender de-transitioning. Program reviews include: Last King of the Cross, The Claremont Murders, Black Snow, North Shore, Warnie
5	"2024 Special"	Mitch McTaggart	30 December 2024
McTaggart looks at a specific episode of Under Investigation profiling murder victim Samantha Murphy; the ABC's Fresh Blood comedy initiative; and the news coverage of Arj Barker apparently kicking a breastfeeding mother out of a live comedy show. Also looks at how Bruce Lehrmann's legal trial played out in the media. Program reviews include: Prosper, Fam Time, Human Error, Fake, Aussie Shore
6	"2025 Special"	Mitch McTaggart	29 December 2025
McTaggart compares the various documentaries about the mushroom murders, and discusses the demise of Q+A and The Project, as well as the latter’s replacement, 10 News+. In deeper dives, he looks at Married At First Sight’s response to domestic violence, and a comprehensive look at how the news irresponsibly reports on neo-Nazis. Program reviews include: Apple Cider Vinegar, The Family Next Door, Watching You, The Survivors, RFDS

== Critical reception ==
The Last Year of Television has received consistently positive reviews. It regularly attracts praise for its humour and research.

Screenhub wrote "it’s a show made by people who care enough about television to tell it like it is," adding that "[McTaggart's] take on the local industry is both funny and well-informed, backed up by the kind of in-depth research that rarely goes into coverage of anything on television."

Metro Magazine described the show as "careful, honest and hilarious", with "a sharp humour reminiscent of iconic UK series Charlie Brooker’s Screenwipe."

Clare Rigden of The West Australian wrote that "we owe [McTaggart] a debt of gratitude... he's been able to articulate so much of what we find askew and not-quite-right about Australian TV."

In December 2025, Screenhub featured Last Year in the 5 best Australian TV series of 2025, shared jointly with The Back Side of Television.

== Awards and nominations ==
In 2023, The Last Year of Television won the AWGIE award for Comedy (Sketch or Light Entertainment), and was nominated again in 2024.

== See also ==
- The Back Side of Television - a companion series that further analyses Australian television
