= Santilla Chingaipe =

Zambian-born Australian journalist, author and filmmaker

- Born: 198? Zambia
- Occupations: Journalist, author, film maker
- Notable work: Black Convicts (2024)

Santilla Chingaipe is a Zambian-born Australian award-winning journalist, author and filmmaker. Her documentaries include Third Culture Kids and Our African Roots, among others. She has been a guest on Tomorrow Tonight and Q&A.

== Background ==
Chingaipe is an African Australian who migrated to Australia at the age of 10. She currently lives in the Victorian city of Melbourne. Her film-making efforts include the documentary Our African Roots. The documentary, which she produced with director Tony Jackson, was an MIPCOM Diversify TV Award-winner in 2022.

As well as being a film maker and author, Chingaipe has been a full-time journalist for SBS Television. She spent 10 years with SBS. During that time, she reported from various locations in the African continent where she interviewed some the most prominent African leaders. She eventually left her job with SBS to concentrate full time on film making.

In addition to English, Chingaipe speaks Bemba, Nyanja and Namwanga, which are all Zambian languages. She can also speak some Swahili.

She has had recognition at the Victorian African Community Awards and the Celebration of African Australians Awards. She is also a four-time finalist for the United Nations Association of Australia Media Peace Awards.

She has written for The Saturday Paper. Her articles include "The rise of far-right Hindu nationalism in Australia" (August 20, 2022), "Farm activists face tougher laws" (July 27, 2019), "Black Rhinos teams lift a community" (February 18, 2023).

She founded the annual program Behind the Screens. Supported by VicScreen, this program operates with a view to increasing the representation of those people who have not been included in the Australian film industry in the past.

== Film career ==
Chingaipe wrote and directed the 2017 documentary short Black as Me.

She directed Third Culture Kids, an Arenamedia production. It is a documentary about six Australian artists from different backgrounds. It was produced by Kate Laurie and Chloe Brugale, with Robert Connolly as the executive producer. It looks at things from the artists' perspective such as what it means to belong, representation, racism and identity.

During the pandemic, Chingaipe made The Dancer, a short documentary that featured performance artist Zelia Rose.

Chingaipe's film Our African Roots premiered on SBS television in October 2021. The film looks at a forgotten and neglected part of Australian history. There were 10 convicts of African heritage among the 1788 arrivals. Among the names of the forgotten and overlooked were John Randall, Billy Blue, John Martin, Fanny Finch, and John Joseph. In her investigations, Chingaipe talks with descendants of Fanny Finch in Castlemaine. What comes to light is Fanny's involvement in the history of Victoria's gold rush era and her role in the right for women to vote.

== Written work ==
=== Books ===
Chingaipe's non-fiction book Black Convicts was published by Scribner Australia in 2024. According to the Simon & Schuster website, quoting Scribner Australia's publisher Ben Ball: "Santilla peels off another layer of the whitewashing of our history." In 2025, the book was shortlisted for the Stella Prize and for the University of Queensland Nonfiction Book Award at the Queensland Literary Awards.

== Appearances ==
- Tomorrow Tonight, Episode 5 "The App", aired 28 November 2018.
- Q&A, Episode: The Ethics of Accountability, broadcast Thu 8 July 2021.
- Q&A, Episode: "Power, Politics, and the Spectre of War", broadcast Thu 17 November 2022.
