= The Back Side of Television =

Australian television comedy series

- Series one title card
- Genre: Comedy documentary; Television review; Satire
- Written by: Mitch McTaggart
- Directed by: Ryan Thomas
- Presented by: Mitch McTaggart
- Country of origin: Australia
- Original language: English
- No. of seasons: 3
- No. of episodes: 14

Production
- Producers: Mitch McTaggart; James Westland
- Running time: 24-39 minutes
- Production company: Doug Watched Half

Original release
- Network: SBS
- Release: 15 November – 29 November 2021
- Network: Binge
- Release: 10 July 2023 – present

Related
- The Last Year of Television

The Back Side of Television is an Australian TV review comedy programme created and presented by Mitch McTaggart, first broadcast in 2021. It is a companion series to the end-of-year special The Last Year of Television, also created by McTaggart.

== Origin ==
The show was conceived after McTaggart lacked the airtime in The Last Year of Television to explore themes and topics that had emerged during research, saying "a year in television is never just a year. It’s always everything that’s come before... and so The Back Side of Television is all about how we got to where we are."

Back Side explores the history of Australian television (predominantly focused on free-to-air) with long form criticism and analysis.

== Format ==
Described as "an anti-clipshow", The Back Side of Television avoids nostalgia and discussion of well-known TV moments. McTaggart explained that we already see "Molly dying on A Country Practice... every five years."

McTaggart presents clips from Australian television programmes, adding humorous commentary, sometimes described as "savage" and "bitchy". Supporting information such as archived newspapers, academic papers and government reports are also used to contribute to a larger argument or discussion. McTaggart describes the series approach as "more of a video essay presenting a case".

Episodes usually contain three or four unconnected subjects, and can include program reviews, discussion of TV scandals or industry incompetence, or the long-term cultural effects of TV. Episodes occasionally focus on single topics, such children's programming or depictions of police corruption.

Episodes can take months to put together, as the research can include manually looking through newspapers on microfilm.

== Series overview ==
The first series originally aired on SBS Viceland in 2021, before moving to Binge from 2022 for its second series.

In 2024, it was renewed for a third series.

Series	Episodes	Original release		Network
Series	Episodes	First aired	Last aired	Network
1	3	15 November 2021	29 November 2021	SBS
2	6	10 July 2023		Binge
3	5	30 June 2025	14 July 2025	Binge

== Episodes ==
=== Series 1 (2021) ===
No. overall	No. in series	Title	Written by	Release date
1	1	"100% Nothing Down The Well"	Mitch McTaggart	15 November 2021
McTaggart talks about the emotional consequences of appearing on Australian Idol. Also, TV's obsession with true crime, psychics, and the murder of Peter Falconio. He then discusses how a man once broke out jail, only to try and audition for Australia's Most Wanted - possibly for the role of himself. Programs also mentioned include: Crime Investigation Australia, Sensing Murder, The One
2	2	"Excellent Question, Elizabeth"	Mitch McTaggart	22 November 2021
McTaggart looks at the casting fallout of Wonderland, a 2013 relationship drama series. He also looks at how Australian television has repeatedly platformed fringe views (such as the debunked vaccine and autism link), ultimately contributing to those views becoming more accepted in society. Programs also mentioned include: 60 Minutes, Catalyst, Today Tonight, Rush, Cops L.A.C.
3	3	"Can't Reach The Hospital TV Remote"	Mitch McTaggart	29 November 2021
McTaggart charts the bleaker side of queer representation in Australian television, and the impacts it may have had. He also revisits a controversial 2012 A Current Affair story, titled 'All Asian Mall', to see if anything changed afterward. He also looks at the future of Australian television, and how free-to-air TV has become a haven for boomers. Programs also mentioned include: Sunday Night, Skyways, G.P., Prisoner, Are You Being Served?, Always Greener Guest starring James Sherry

=== Series 2 (2023) ===
No. overall	No. in series	Title	Written by	Release date
4	1	"Anzac Fatigue!"	Mitch McTaggart	10 July 2023
A look at the decline of opening titles in Australian television; the 2015 TV disaster of the ANZAC 100th anniversary; and a comprehensive analysis of how Channel 9 appeared to sabotage its own local sci-fi series Farscape in 1999. Programs also mentioned include: Tangle, Gallipoli, Anzac Girls
5	2	"Play School Mafia!"	Mitch McTaggart	10 July 2023
McTaggart explores what happened to a local Tasmanian TV station when it broadcast too many commercials in 1975. He also looks at the lengths that producers of Play School went to attempting to prevent the ABC from broadcasting Sesame Street in 1970. Programs also mentioned include: Bananas in Pyjamas, Lift Off
6	3	"Bad News!"	Mitch McTaggart	10 July 2023
The consequences of live TV are explored through a 1997 moment from The Footy Show. McTaggart also discusses how commercial news has changed since 1980, from subdued and informative, to alarmist and extreme.
7	4	"Classification War!"	Mitch McTaggart	10 July 2023
An episode looking entirely at the 1979 introduction of the C classification, designed by the Children's Program Committee, whose primary goal was to improve the quality of TV content for children. It charts the various ways the commercial networks acted out against it, ultimately causing the committee's abolition in 1992. Programs also mentioned include: Carrots, Fat Cat and Friends, The Adventures of Skippy
8	5	"Game Show Scam!"	Mitch McTaggart	10 July 2023
McTaggart looks at magician James Randi's association with Australian television through two notable moments, one of them leading to the public humiliation of Channel 9 staff. Also a look at TV's questionable 50-year history of bingo broadcasts, specifically a rivalry between Channels 7 and 9 in 1965, 1992 and 2007. Programs also mentioned include: The Don Lane Show, National Bingo Night, Sunrise, Quizmania, A Current Affair
9	6	"Channel 10 Heist!"	Mitch McTaggart	10 July 2023
McTaggart explores the modern trend of TV dramas being depressing, by comparing two shark crime shows - 2018's Bite Club, and 1983's Shark's Paradise. He also looks at one of the first major scandals of Australian TV, when actor Chuck Faulkner was charged with robbing the Channel 10 payroll office in 1966. Guest starring Tony Martin, Djovan Caro

=== Series 3 (2025) ===
No. overall	No. in series	Title	Written by	Release date
10	1	"Trapped Under Something!"	Mitch McTaggart	30 June 2025
McTaggart revisits 1973 horror anthology series The Evil Touch; how Australian TV responded to the 1980s nuclear threat; and he roadtests a theory that TV interviews of trauma survivors are only successful if they've been trapped under something. Programs mentioned include Threads, The Day After, Beyond 2000
11	2	"Cop Propaganda!"	Mitch McTaggart	7 July 2025
Part one of two. McTaggart gives context to the criticism surrounding Scales of Justice, a 1983 ABC drama about police corruption, by demonstrating how closely police have worked with Australian drama production since the beginning of TV. Programs mentioned include Homicide, Division 4, Matlock Police, Cop Shop
12	3	"PR Apocalypse!"	Mitch McTaggart	7 July 2025
Part two of two. McTaggart discusses the public humiliation of police thanks to the ABC documentary exposé Cop It Sweet in 1991, and how law enforcement ended up with complete editorial control in television programmes. Programs mentioned include The Force: Behind The Line, RBT, Border Security: Australia's Front Line
13	4	"Man vs Man!"	Mitch McTaggart	14 July 2025
McTaggart looks at the saturation of 0055 numbers in the 1990s; the lack of legislation and clarity surrounding the legality of VCRs in the early 80s; as well as an analysis of the 1994 ratings battle between game show Man O Man and hit variety show Hey Hey It's Saturday.
14	5	"Soap Conspiracy!"	Mitch McTaggart	14 July 2025
McTaggart uncovers a 1974 incident where a government report into the price of laundry detergents triggered an inquiry into commercial news. Also a look into nostalgia specials via the critically panned The Australian Way from 1982. Guest starring Stephen Hall

== Reception ==
The series has received highly positive reviews. David Knox of TV Tonight called it "must see TV", Glen Humphries of The Canberra Times described it similarly as "the best show on TV", while noting the show's level of "serious research". The Sydney Morning Herald also observed the "labour-intensive" nature of the show, and describing McTaggart as a "kind-hearted cynic".

Writing in Metro Magazine, Dr Liz Giuffre wrote the series is "a joy to watch and relive – and, perhaps, to google furiously in order to check whether what we’re seeing genuinely happened". Anthony Morris wrote in Screenhub that the series is "quick-witted, thoughtful and incisive, this is a thoroughly entertaining look at the bizarre and fatally flawed side of Australian television."

Clare Rigden of The West Australian noted the series' distinction from other clip-focused shows The Cheap Seats and 20 to One, saying "this is neither of those things" while also adding "do not miss this show!"

The third series in particular has been compared favourably to Last Week Tonight with John Oliver, with Gloss Australia writing that "McTaggart isn't afraid to pull punches or lose any friends in the industry" and that the show is the "kind of TV that makes subscription streaming services worthwhile."

In 2022, the series was nominated for an ATOM Award in the category Best Factual Television Series.

In December 2025, Screenhub featured Back Side in the 5 best Australian TV series of 2025, shared jointly with The Last Year of Television.

== See also ==
- The Last Year of Television
