= The Three Sea-Wolves =

- Directed by: Peter Benardos
- Starring: Con Babanoitis; Chantal Contouri
- Country of origin: Australia
- Original languages: English; Greek; Italian

Production
- Producers: Jill Robb; Eric Fullilove

Original release
- Release: 24 October 1980

The Three Sea Wolves is an Australian television movie which first screened in 1980 on Channel 0/28 (later known as the SBS). It was based on a Greek play about an Italian actress who meets a young Greek.

The movie was screened on the evening of the first day the channel was on air in Australia.

== Cast ==
- Con Babanoitis as Manolis
- Chantal Contouri as Laura Fiore
- Takis Emmanuel as Host
- Sakis Fidogiannia as Michael
