= Julie Goodwin =

Australian television cook

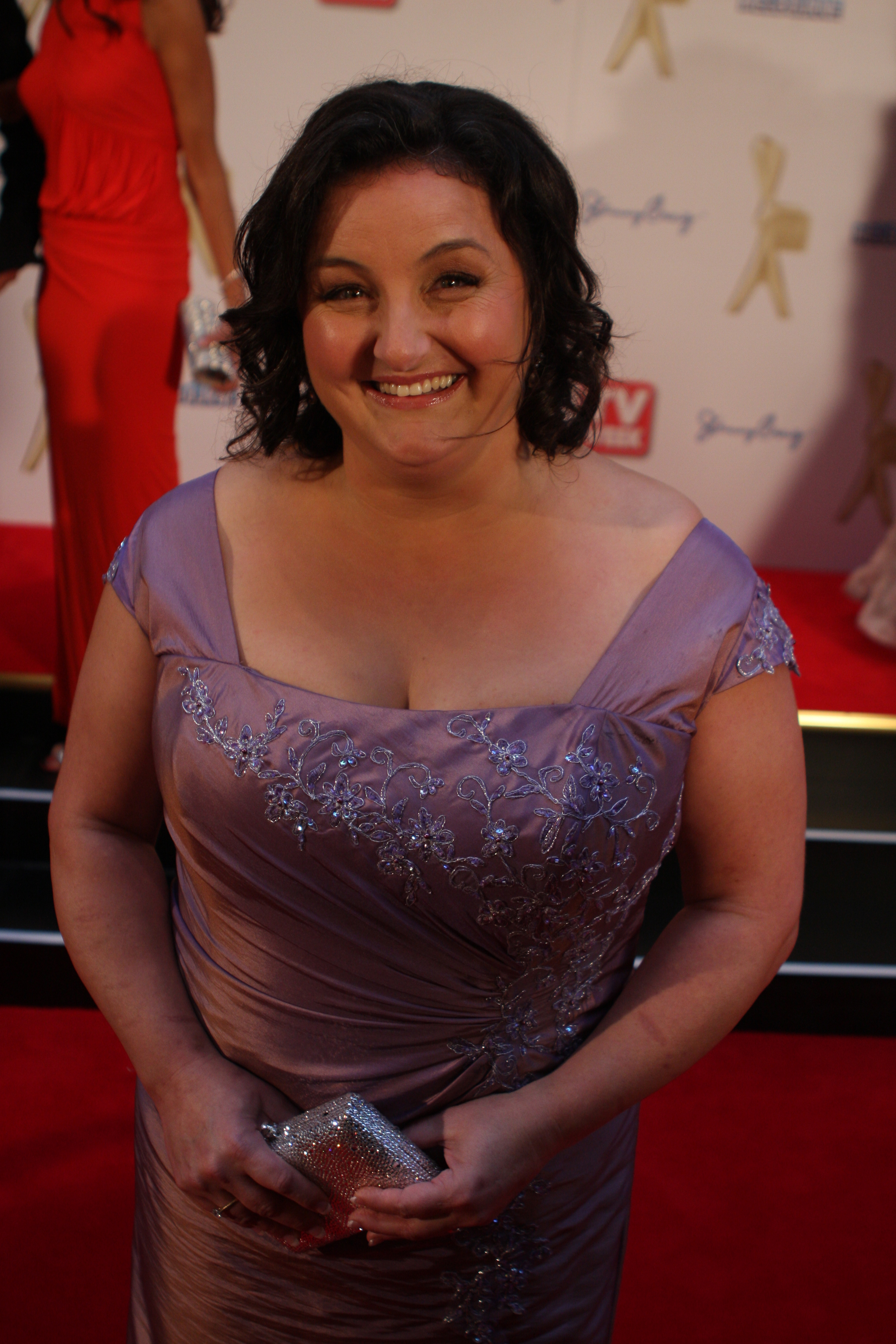
- Goodwin at the 2011 Logie Awards
- Born: 31 October 1970 (age 56); Sydney, New South Wales, Australia
- Occupations: Cook, author, radio and television presenter
- Successor: Adam Liaw
- Spouse: Michael Goodwin
- Children: 3
- Awards: Winner, MasterChef Australia
- Website: juliegoodwin.com.au

Julie Goodwin (born 31 October 1970) is an Australian cook, author, radio and television presenter. She came to public attention when she won the inaugural season of MasterChef Australia in 2009, defeating artist Poh Ling Yeow in the final.

== Career ==
=== Television ===
For the first season of MasterChef Australia, Goodwin was selected from over 7,000 applicants who applied for the show.

After winning MasterChef, Goodwin appeared in a weekly cooking segment on the Today program in 2010. She was also involved in a segment on The 7pm Project where families were able to enter a contest to have Goodwin cook at their house live on television. Later that year Goodwin hosted Home Cooked! With Julie Goodwin, an afternoon cooking series that screened on the Nine Network. It featured tips and tricks for creating meals at home, and featured celebrity guests such as actor Gyton Grantley, cricketer Steve Waugh, radio and television host Amanda Keller and singer Ricki-Lee Coulter.

In 2012, Goodwin returned to MasterChef Australia, competing on MasterChef Australia All-Stars. The series, which saw contestants from the first three seasons returning to raise money for charity, saw Goodwin raise $35,000 for the Lort Smith Animal Hospital.

In 2015, Goodwin appeared in the first season of I'm a Celebrity Get Me Out of Here!.

Goodwin returned to contest series 14 of MasterChef Australia in 2022, finishing 5th. The season featured a mix of returning contestants and new contenders.

In 2024, Goodwin appeared as a contestant on the twenty-first season of Seven Network's Dancing with the Stars. She was the fourth contestant to be eliminated.

In November 2024, she appeared as a guest judge on Seven Network's cooking competition reality show My Kitchen Rules for the grand final.

In 2025 she appeared as a contestant on Claire Hooper's House Of Games.

=== Books ===
As the winner of MasterChef Australia, Goodwin was given the opportunity to write her own cookbook. The book, Our Family Table (ISBN 9781741669688), was published in April 2010. It features some recipes which were passed down through Goodwin's family, while others were given by friends. Goodwin also included recipes she created on MasterChef Australia, such as lemon diva cupcakes and passionfruit 'puddle pie'. The final section of the book is a 'blank' chapter with pages for the reader's own photos, clippings and recipes from family and friends.

Goodwin has since released further cookbooks including Heart of the Home (ISBN 1742750095) in 2012, and Gather (ISBN 1742750109) in 2013.

=== Other ===
In 2010, Goodwin released an album of traditional Christmas songs through Universal Music. The CD also contained a booklet with recipes for a complete Christmas dinner; 50% of the profits went to the Society of Saint Vincent de Paul.

In 2014, Goodwin opened a cooking school, Julie's Place.

Between 2015 and December 2019 Goodwin hosted a breakfast radio show, Rabbit and Julie Goodwin, on Star 104.5 on the Central Coast.

== Personal life ==
Goodwin lives with her husband Michael and their three children on the Central Coast of New South Wales.

In April 2018 Goodwin was charged with mid-range drink driving after executing a U-turn to avoid testing. She returned a blood alcohol reading of 0.107; over twice the legal limit, resulting in a licence suspension of six months. Goodwin subsequently pleaded guilty and received a $600 fine.

Goodwin has been vocal about her struggles with her mental health since winning the inaugural season of MasterChef Australia.

Preceded by None	MasterChef Australia; Winner; 2009	Succeeded by Adam Liaw
