= The Liberation of Skopje (1981 film) =

- Based on: play by Dusan Jovanovic
- Written by: Dusan Jovanovic
- Directed by: Ljubisa Ristic
- Starring: Rade Serbedzija
- Music by: Vlatko Stefanovski
- Country of origin: Australia

Production
- Producer: Eric Fullilove
- Running time: 100 mins
- Production company: Ferryman Television

Original release
- Network: SBS
- Release: 9 April 1981

The Liberation of Skopje is an Australian television film released in on 9 April 1981 in Serbo-Croatian language. It is also known as Oslobodenje Skoplja or KPGT which is about the liberation of Skopje prison.

== Plot ==
Zoran is an eight-year-old boy who sees the German occupy Skopje, Vardar Macedonia in 1942. His father Dushan is a member of the partisan forces and his uncle, Georgij plays a part in the assassination of a high ranking German officer, as well as in the evacuation and transport of Jews to the free territories.

== Cast ==
- Rade Serbedzija as Georgij Potevski
- Sasa Kuzmanovic as Zoran
- Inge Appelt as Lence
- Miljenko Brlecic as Bale
- Ratko Buljan as Doktor
- Darko Curdo as Chief Bulgarian Police
- Antonia Cutic as Ana
- Tone Gogala as Stojcev
- Dragoljub Lazarov as Gospodinov

== Production ==
It was based on a Yugoslavian play of the same name which won the 28th Annual Village Voice 1983 Obie Award for Special Citations Off Broadway in New York and toured Australia in 1980. The film was produced by Ferryman Television with an estimated production budget of 100,000 AUD. Scenes were shot in locations such as Sydney and New South Wales.

== See also ==
- Capture of Skopje (1944)
