= Binge (streaming service) =

Australian streaming service owned by Hubbl

- Company type: Subsidiary
- Website type: Over-the-top media service
- Available in: English
- Predecessor: Binge (TV channel)
- Headquarters: Gore Hill, New South Wales, Australia
- Area served: Australia
- Owner: DAZN
- CEO: Hilary Perchard
- Key people: Dani Simpson (executive director)
- Products: Streaming media; Video on demand
- Parent: Foxtel Group
- Website: binge.com.au
- Registration: Monthly/yearly subscription required to access content
- Users: ▲1.529M (as of 31 March 2023)
- Launched: 25 May 2020; 6 years ago
- Current status: Active

Binge is an Australian subscription video on-demand service owned by DAZN, a subsidiary of Foxtel Group. The service is devoted primarily to entertainment content, including television series and films.

== History ==
In August 2018 it was reported that Foxtel were expected to announce an entertainment subscription video on demand (SVOD) service. The service, internally codenamed Project Jupiter, aimed to combat the building competition from streaming services such as Netflix, Stan, and Amazon Prime Video. This new service would complement Foxtel's sports SVOD service which had been given the go-ahead (later launched as Kayo Sports) as well as offer an alternative to traditional satellite and cable Foxtel services.

In October 2018, it was reported that Project Jupiter would launch in the first half of 2019 to coincide with the final season of Game of Thrones. In March 2019 it was reported that Foxtel had green-lit Project Jupiter. However, it did not launch in early 2019, as previously reported. In September 2019 it was reported that Foxtel had assembled a staff of 40 ahead of the launch who were located within the same facility as sister-company Kayo Sports. It was also noted the service's code name had changed from Project Jupiter to Project Ares.

On 23 May 2020 it was announced that the new service would be called Binge. It officially launched on 25 May 2020.

=== Subscribers ===
Date	Paying subscribers	Total subscribers	Ref
2020-08-04	185,000	217,000	
2020-09-30	290,000	321,000	
2020-12-26	431,000	468,000	
2021-03-31	561,000	679,000	
2021-06-30	733,000	827,000	
2021-12-31	928,000	1,040,000	
2022-08-08	1,192,000	1,263,000	
2023-02-10	1,375,000	1,439,000	
2023-03-31	1,484,000	1,529,000	
2024-08-09	1,529,000	1,552,000	

Binge reached 1.571 million paid subscribers (up 4%) during the first quarter of fiscal year 2025, according to financial disclosures released via the Foxtel Group Fiscal 2025 First Quarter Earnings.

View source data.

== Content ==
At launch, Binge was reported to offer over 10,000 hours of entertainment, lifestyle, reality and movie content without advertisements, which was expected to expand to 20,000 hours of content within 12 months.

=== Output deals ===
Binge's content is drawn primarily from output deals with Foxtel. Not all content available on Foxtel may be available on Binge due to competing agreements with other distributors (including other Australian TV channels) and/or streaming services in Australia.

Ahead of Binge's launch, Foxtel and Binge acquired Australian rights to HBO Max original programmes distributed by Warner Bros. Television Studios. In September 2022, Foxtel announced that WWE Network content would move exclusively to Binge in January 2023. HBO Max is now confirmed to launch in Australia as a stand-alone streaming service on 31 March 2025, around the same time their deal with parent company Warner Bros. Discovery expires. Foxtel will instead include the streaming app and its subscription to the Basic with Ads plan on their IQ boxes for Foxtel subscribers at launch at no extra cost, confirming that nearly all HBO and Warner Bros. Discovery content will migrate to Max app upon arrival, meaning that Foxtel will now act as HBO Max's launch partner instead via a new deal. In addition, WWE programming was removed from Binge in a two-stage set-up in late 2024, due to the move of all WWE programming to Netflix. The first stage saw live WWE content drop off of the Fox8 schedule in September 2024, and the second stage saw all remaining programming dropped on New Year's Day 2025, with the Australian WWE Network channel closing as a result.

Some of Binge's suppliers include:

- 20th Television (via Walt Disney Studios; selected titles)
- ABC Commercial
- All3Media
- Amazon MGM Studios
- Amblin Partners (via NBCUniversal)
- American International Pictures (via Amazon MGM Studios)
- Banijay
- Cineflix Rights
- CNN (via Warner Bros. Discovery)
- Columbia Pictures (via Sony Pictures)
- DC Entertainment (via Warner Bros. Discovery)
- Focus Features (via NBCUniversal)
- Fremantle
- ITV Studios
- Lionsgate
- Metro-Goldwyn-Mayer (via Amazon MGM Studios)
- Miramax (via Paramount Global)
- NBCUniversal
- New Line Cinema (via Warner Bros. Discovery)
- Paramount Global
- Paramount Pictures (via Paramount Global)
- Sony Pictures Television
- StudioCanal
- Summit Entertainment (via Lionsgate)
- Telepictures (via Warner Bros. Discovery)
- TriStar Pictures (via Sony Pictures)
- Universal Pictures (via NBCUniversal)
- Village Roadshow Pictures
- Warner Bros. Discovery
- Warner Bros. Pictures (via Warner Bros. Discovery)

=== Movies ===
Binge has access to some Foxtel movie output deals, including Australian cinema, Hollywood blockbusters, British films, independent film and other global releases. Binge may or may not share a same day release with a Foxtel Movies release, depending on the title and the output deal with its distributor. Some blockbusters like Universal Pictures’ Fast & Furious franchise had an exclusive window on Foxtel's Movies Package before being made available to Binge and other Foxtel on demand subscribes.

=== Live linear TV channels ===
Binge also carries a lineup of 34 live linear television networks from Foxtel and other broadcasters.

Foxtel-owned:

- Foxtel One
- Showcase
- News24
- Sky News UK
- Boxsets
- Crime
- Famous
- Classics
- British
- Comedy
- FOX8
- LifeStyle
  - Lifestyle Food
  - Lifestyle Home
  - Arena
- Real Life
- Real Crime
- Bloomberg
- CNN
- MSNBC
- Investigation Discovery
- DocPlay
- Travel
- Real History
- Discovery Turbo
- Discovery
- Fashion TV
- LMN
- BBC UKTV
- TLC
- Universal TV
- Animal Planet
- DreamWorks Channel

=== Original programming ===
- Upright (2019–2022)
- Love Me (2021–)
- Colin from Accounts (2022–2026)
- The Last Year of Television (2022–)
- The Real Housewives of Melbourne (2027–)
- The Real Housewives of Sydney (2023–2025)
- The Back Side of Television (2023–)
- Strife (2023–)
- How to Make Gravy (2024)
- The Last Anniversary (2025)
- Billion Dollar Playground (2025–)

== Subscription packages ==
As of 2024, Binge offers three tiers of monthly subscriptions defined by the number of simultaneous streams allowed – 1, 2, or 4 – and the quality of the streamed content from High Definition to 4K. The basic plan now includes advertisements on all content except movies. The subscriptions range from $10 to $22.

== See also ==
- Foxtel Now
- Kayo Sports
- Internet television in Australia
- Subscription television in Australia
- List of streaming media services
