= Family Rules (Australian TV series) =

Australian Docuseries

- Genre: Reality television
- Country of origin: Australia
- Original language: English
- No. of seasons: 2
- No. of episodes: 12

Production
- Running time: 30 minutes

Original release
- Network: NITV
- Release: 9 January 2017 – present

Family Rules is an Australian observational documentary television series that premiered on 9 January 2017 on NITV. It follows the household of Daniella Rule, a widow raising nine daughters in Perth, Western Australia. The second season follows the younger daughters.
