= List of digital television channels in Australia =

This is a list of the current channels available on digital terrestrial television in Australia.

The commercial channels available to viewers depend on location and station ownership. The process of aggregation during the late 80s to mid 90s saw regional stations take on affiliations with metropolitan channels for programming, a practice that has continued into digital television with affiliated stations carrying various multichannels from their metropolitan counterparts.

Metropolitan in this list therefore refers to the capitals of Sydney, Melbourne, Brisbane, Adelaide and Perth, where stations were historically owned and operated by the networks rather than affiliates. Regional and remote in this list refers to all other areas which also cover the capitals of Canberra, Hobart and Darwin.

In areas not covered by terrestrial transmissions, the digital channels are provided by the free-to-view VAST satellite platform. The television channels on this platform are all encoded in H.264 (MPEG-4) and subject to a MPEG-LA controlled transmission patent licensing tax which is included in the VAST broadcaster cost and varies on viewership figures. Terrestrial transmissions, which do not inccur a patent licensing tax, have mostly transitioned to H.264 (MPEG-4), with select channels still using H.262 (MPEG-2).

Broadcaster availability
Nationwide	Metropolitan	Regional/remote

== Public broadcasters ==
=== Australian Broadcasting Corporation ===
DVB name	LCN	Broadcast hours	Format	Programming content	Availability
ABC TV	2	24 hours	576i SDTV (MPEG-2)	Primary channel, news bulletins, foreign/nationally produced	Nationwide, except Tasmania
ABC TV	21	24 hours	576i SDTV (MPEG-2)	Primary channel, news bulletins, foreign/nationally produced	Nationwide
ABC TV HD	20	24 hours	1080i HDTV (MPEG-4)	Primary channel, news bulletins, foreign/nationally produced	Nationwide
ABC TV HD	2	24 hours	1080i HDTV (MPEG-4)	Primary channel, news bulletins, foreign/nationally produced	Tasmania
ABC Kids	22	04:00 – 19:30	576i SDTV (MPEG-2)	Children, foreign/nationally produced	Nationwide
ABC Family	22	19:30 – 04:00	576i SDTV (MPEG-2)	Family programming, foreign/nationally produced	Nationwide
ABC Entertains	23	24 hours	1080i HDTV (MPEG-4)	Foreign/nationally produced	Nationwide
ABC News	24	24 hours	1080i HDTV (MPEG-4)	News bulletins	Nationwide

ABC Radio
DVB name	LCN	Broadcast hours	Format	Programming content	Availability
ABC Local Radio	25	24 hours	Stereo audio	Talk radio	Nationwide
ABC Radio National	26	24 hours	Stereo audio	Talk radio	Nationwide
ABC Classic	27	24 hours	Stereo audio	Music radio	Nationwide
triple j	28	24 hours	Stereo audio	Music radio	Nationwide
triple j Unearthed	29	24 hours	Stereo audio	Music radio	Nationwide
Double J	200	24 hours	Stereo audio	Music radio	Nationwide
ABC Jazz	201	24 hours	Stereo audio	Music radio	Nationwide
ABC Kids Listen	202	24 hours	Stereo audio	Children's radio	Nationwide
ABC Country	203	24 hours	Stereo audio	Music radio	Nationwide
ABC NewsRadio	204	24 hours	Stereo audio	News radio	Nationwide

=== Special Broadcasting Service ===
DVB name	LCN	Broadcast hours	Format	Programming content	Availability
SBS	3	24 hours	576i SDTV (MPEG-2)	Primary channel, news bulletins, foreign/nationally produced	Nationwide, except Tasmania
SBS	30	24 hours	576i SDTV (MPEG-2)	Primary channel, news bulletins, foreign/nationally produced	Tasmania
SBS HD	30	24 hours	1080i HDTV (MPEG-4)	Primary channel, news bulletins, foreign/nationally produced	Nationwide, except Tasmania
SBS HD	3	24 hours	1080i HDTV (MPEG-4)	Primary channel, news bulletins, foreign/nationally produced	Tasmania
SBS2	31	24 hours	1080i HDTV (MPEG-4)	Foreign/nationally produced	Nationwide
SBS World Movies	32	24 hours	1080i HDTV (MPEG-4)	Movies and entertainment, foreign/nationally produced	Nationwide
SBS Food	33	24 hours	576i SDTV (MPEG-4)	Lifestyle, foreign/nationally produced	Nationwide
NITV HD	34	24 hours	1080i HDTV (MPEG-4)	Simulcast of NITV, Indigenous, foreign/nationally produced	Nationwide
NITV	36	24 hours	576i SDTV (MPEG-2)	Indigenous, foreign/nationally produced	Nationwide

SBS Radio
DVB name	LCN	Broadcast hours	Format	Programming content	Availability
SBS Radio 1	301	24 hours	Stereo audio	News radio	Nationwide
SBS Radio 2	302	24 hours	Stereo audio	News radio	Nationwide
SBS Radio 3	303	24 hours	Stereo audio	News radio	Nationwide
SBS Arabic	304	24 hours	Stereo audio	News radio	Nationwide
SBS South Asian	305	24 hours	Stereo audio	Music radio	Nationwide
SBS Chill	306	24 hours	Stereo audio	Music radio	Nationwide
SBS PopAsia	307	24 hours	Stereo audio	Music radio	Nationwide

== Commercial network broadcasters ==
=== Seven Media Group ===
DVB name	LCN	Broadcast hours	Format	Programming content	Availability
Seven	7	24 hours	1080i HDTV (MPEG-4)	Primary channel, news bulletins, foreign/nationally produced	Sydney, Melbourne, Brisbane, Adelaide, Perth
Seven	70	24 hours	1080i HDTV (MPEG-4)	Primary channel, news bulletins, foreign/nationally produced	Sydney, Melbourne, Brisbane, Adelaide, Perth
Seven	71	24 hours	1080i HDTV (MPEG-4)	Primary channel, news bulletins, foreign/nationally produced	Sydney, Melbourne, Brisbane, Adelaide, Perth
7two	72	24 hours	1080i HDTV (MPEG-4)	Foreign/nationally produced	Sydney, Melbourne, Brisbane, Adelaide, Perth
7mate	74	24 hours	1080i HDTV (MPEG-4)	Foreign/nationally produced	Sydney, Melbourne, Brisbane, Adelaide, Perth
7Bravo	75	24 hours	1080i HDTV (MPEG-4)	Reality and true crime, foreign/nationally produced	Sydney, Melbourne, Brisbane, Adelaide, Perth
7flix	76	24 hours	576i SDTV (MPEG-4)	Movies and entertainment, foreign/nationally produced	Sydney, Melbourne, Brisbane, Adelaide, Perth
Racing.com	78	24 hours	576i SDTV (MPEG-4)	Datacast, horse racing	Sydney, Melbourne, Brisbane, Adelaide, Perth

7 Queensland
DVB name	LCN	Broadcast hours	Format	Programming content	Availability
Seven	7	24 hours	1080i HDTV (MPEG-4)	Primary channel, news bulletins, foreign/nationally produced	Regional QLD
Seven	70	24 hours	1080i HDTV (MPEG-4)	Primary channel, news bulletins, foreign/nationally produced	Regional QLD
Seven	71	24 hours	1080i HDTV (MPEG-4)	Primary channel, news bulletins, foreign/nationally produced	Regional QLD
Seven	6	24 hours	1080i HDTV (MPEG-4)	Primary channel, news bulletins, foreign/nationally produced	Sunshine Coast, Toowoomba QLD
Seven	60	24 hours	1080i HDTV (MPEG-4)	Primary channel, news bulletins, foreign/nationally produced	Sunshine Coast, Toowoomba QLD
Seven	61	24 hours	1080i HDTV (MPEG-4)	Primary channel, news bulletins, foreign/nationally produced	Sunshine Coast, Toowoomba QLD
7two	72	24 hours	1080i HDTV (MPEG-4)	Foreign/nationally produced	Regional QLD
7two	62	24 hours	1080i HDTV (MPEG-4)	Foreign/nationally produced	Sunshine Coast, Toowoomba QLD
7mate	74	24 hours	1080i HDTV (MPEG-4)	Foreign/nationally produced	Regional QLD
7mate	64	24 hours	1080i HDTV (MPEG-4)	Foreign/nationally produced	Sunshine Coast, Toowoomba QLD
7Bravo	75	24 hours	1080i HDTV (MPEG-4)	Reality and true crime, foreign/nationally produced	Regional QLD
7Bravo	65	24 hours	1080i HDTV (MPEG-4)	Reality and true crime, foreign/nationally produced	Sunshine Coast, Toowoomba QLD
7flix	76	24 hours	576i SDTV (MPEG-4)	Movies and entertainment, foreign/nationally produced	Regional QLD
7flix	66	24 hours	576i SDTV (MPEG-4)	Movies and entertainment, foreign/nationally produced	Sunshine Coast, Toowoomba QLD
Racing.com	78	24 hours	576i SDTV (MPEG-4)	Datacast, horse racing	Regional QLD
Racing.com	68	24 hours	576i SDTV (MPEG-4)	Datacast, horse racing	Sunshine Coast, Toowoomba QLD

STQ Regional QLD services broadcast on 6x LCNs where signal overlap with BTQ Brisbane occurs.

7 Regional NSW & Victoria
DVB name	LCN	Broadcast hours	Format	Programming content	Availability
Seven	6	24 hours	1080i HDTV (MPEG-4)	Primary channel, news bulletins, foreign/nationally produced	Northern NSW/Gold Coast QLD, Southern NSW/ACT, Regional VIC, Mildura VIC/Sunraysia
Seven	60	24 hours	1080i HDTV (MPEG-4)	Primary channel, news bulletins, foreign/nationally produced	Northern NSW/Gold Coast QLD, Southern NSW/ACT, Regional VIC, Mildura VIC/Sunraysia
7two	62	24 hours	1080i HDTV (MPEG-4)	Foreign/nationally produced	Northern NSW/Gold Coast QLD, Southern NSW/ACT, Regional VIC, Mildura VIC/Sunraysia
7mate	64	24 hours	1080i HDTV (MPEG-4)	Foreign/nationally produced	Northern NSW/Gold Coast QLD, Southern NSW/ACT, Regional VIC, Mildura VIC/Sunraysia
7Bravo	65	24 hours	1080i HDTV (MPEG-4)	Reality and true crime, foreign/nationally produced	Northern NSW/Gold Coast QLD, Southern NSW/ACT, Regional VIC, Mildura VIC/Sunraysia
7flix	66	24 hours	576i SDTV (MPEG-4)	Movies and entertainment, foreign/nationally produced	Northern NSW/Gold Coast QLD, Southern NSW/ACT, Regional VIC, Mildura VIC/Sunraysia
Racing.com	68	24 hours	576i SDTV (MPEG-4)	Datacast, horse racing	Northern NSW/Gold Coast QLD, Southern NSW/ACT, Regional VIC, Mildura VIC/Sunraysia

7 Regional WA
DVB name	LCN	Broadcast hours	Format	Programming content	Availability
7 Regional WA	6	24 hours	1080i HDTV (MPEG-4)	Primary channel, news bulletins, foreign/nationally produced	Remote/Regional WA
7two	62	24 hours	576i SDTV (MPEG-4)	Foreign/nationally produced	Remote/Regional WA
7mate	63	24 hours	1080i HDTV (MPEG-4)	Foreign/nationally produced	Remote/Regional WA
Racing.com	68	24 hours	576i SDTV (MPEG-4)	Datacast, horse racing	Remote/Regional WA

7 Tasmania and 7 Spencer Gulf/Broken Hill
DVB name	LCN	Broadcast hours	Format	Programming content	Availability
Seven	6	24 hours	1080i HDTV (MPEG-4)	Primary channel, news bulletins, foreign/nationally produced	Tasmania, Spencer Gulf SA/Broken Hill NSW
Seven	60	24 hours	1080i HDTV (MPEG-4)	Primary channel, news bulletins, foreign/nationally produced	Tasmania, Spencer Gulf SA/Broken Hill NSW
Seven	61	24 hours	1080i HDTV (MPEG-4)	Primary channel, news bulletins, foreign/nationally produced	Tasmania, Spencer Gulf SA/Broken Hill NSW
7two	62	24 hours	1080i HDTV (MPEG-4)	Foreign/nationally produced	Tasmania, Spencer Gulf SA/Broken Hill NSW
7mate	63	24 hours	1080i HDTV (MPEG-4)	Foreign/nationally produced	Tasmania, Spencer Gulf SA/Broken Hill NSW
SBN	64	24 hours	576i SDTV (MPEG-4)	Datacast, religious	Tasmania
you.tv	66	24 hours	576i SDTV (MPEG-4)	Datacast, infomercial	Tasmania
gecko	67	24 hours	576i SDTV (MPEG-4)	Datacast, infomercial	Tasmania
Racing.com	68	24 hours	576i SDTV (MPEG-4)	Datacast, horse racing	Tasmania, Spencer Gulf SA/Broken Hill NSW

7 Darwin
DVB name	LCN	Broadcast hours	Format	Programming content	Availability
7 Darwin	7	24 hours	1080i HDTV (MPEG-4)	Primary channel, news bulletins, foreign/nationally produced	Darwin
7 Darwin	70	24 hours	1080i HDTV (MPEG-4)	Primary channel, news bulletins, foreign/nationally produced	Darwin
7 Darwin	71	24 hours	1080i HDTV (MPEG-4)	Primary channel, news bulletins, foreign/nationally produced	Darwin
7two	72	24 hours	1080i HDTV (MPEG-4)	Foreign/nationally produced	Darwin
7mate	73	24 hours	1080i HDTV (MPEG-4)	Foreign/nationally produced	Darwin
Racing.com	78	24 hours	576i SDTV (MPEG-4)	Datacast, horse racing	Darwin

7 Central
DVB name	LCN	Broadcast hours	Format	Programming content	Availability
7 Central	7	24 hours	1080i HDTV (MPEG-4)	Primary channel, news bulletins, foreign/nationally produced	Remote Central/Eastern Australia
7mate	70	24 hours	576i SDTV (MPEG-4)	Foreign/nationally produced	Remote Central/Eastern Australia
7two	72	24 hours	576i SDTV (MPEG-4)	Foreign/nationally produced	Remote Central/Eastern Australia

Spencer Gulf/Broken Hill monopoly stations (Note: One company has a monopoly in this area, as the Australian Communications and Media Authority believes it cannot support more than one commercial television company, but can support multiple commercial television services.)
DVB name	LCN	Broadcast hours	Format	Programming content	Availability
9	8	24 hours	576i SDTV (MPEG-2)	Primary channel, news bulletins, foreign/nationally produced	Spencer Gulf SA/Broken Hill NSW
9	81	24 hours	576i SDTV (MPEG-2)	Primary channel, news bulletins, foreign/nationally produced	Spencer Gulf SA/Broken Hill NSW
9HD	80	24 hours	1080i HDTV (MPEG-4)	Simulcast of Channel 9, primary channel, news bulletins, foreign/nationally produced	Spencer Gulf SA/Broken Hill NSW
9Gem	82	24 hours	576i SDTV (MPEG-2)	Foreign/nationally produced	Spencer Gulf SA/Broken Hill NSW
9Go!	83	24 hours	576i SDTV (MPEG-2)	Foreign/nationally produced	Spencer Gulf SA/Broken Hill NSW
9Life	84	24 hours	576i SDTV (MPEG-4)	Foreign/nationally produced	Spencer Gulf SA/Broken Hill NSW
10	5	24 hours	576i SDTV (MPEG-2)	Primary channel, news bulletins, foreign/nationally produced	Spencer Gulf SA/Broken Hill NSW
10	51	24 hours	576i SDTV (MPEG-2)	Primary channel, news bulletins, foreign/nationally produced	Spencer Gulf SA/Broken Hill NSW
10 HD	50	24 hours	1080i HDTV (MPEG-4)	Simulcast of 10, primary channel, news bulletins, foreign/nationally produced	Spencer Gulf SA/Broken Hill NSW
10 Drama	52	24 hours	576i SDTV (MPEG-2)	Foreign/nationally produced	Spencer Gulf SA/Broken Hill NSW
10 Comedy	53	24 hours	576i SDTV (MPEG-2)	Foreign/nationally produced	Spencer Gulf SA/Broken Hill NSW
SBN	54	24 hours	576i SDTV (MPEG-4)	Datacast, religious	Spencer Gulf SA/Broken Hill NSW
gecko	57	24 hours	576i SDTV (MPEG-4)	Datacast, infomercial	Spencer Gulf SA/Broken Hill NSW
you.tv	58	24 hours	576i SDTV (MPEG-4)	Datacast, infomercial	Spencer Gulf SA/Broken Hill NSW

Seven Media Group also co-owns 10 affiliates West Digital Television (with WIN Corporation), Tasmanian Digital Television (with WIN Corporation), Darwin Digital Television (with WIN Corporation), Central Digital Television (with Imparja Television) and horse racing channel Racing.com (with Racing Victoria).

=== Nine Entertainment ===
DVB name	LCN	Broadcast hours	Format	Programming content	Availability
9HD	9	24 hours	1080i HDTV (MPEG-4)	Primary channel, news bulletins, foreign/nationally produced	Sydney, Melbourne, Brisbane, Adelaide, Perth
9HD	90	24 hours	1080i HDTV (MPEG-4)	Primary channel, news bulletins, foreign/nationally produced	Sydney, Melbourne, Brisbane, Adelaide, Perth
Nine	91	24 hours	576i SDTV (MPEG-2)	Primary channel, news bulletins, foreign/nationally produced	Sydney, Melbourne, Brisbane, Adelaide, Perth
9Gem	92	24 hours	1080i HDTV (MPEG-4)	Foreign/nationally produced	Sydney, Melbourne, Brisbane, Adelaide, Perth
9Gem	95	24 hours	1080i HDTV (MPEG-4)	Foreign/nationally produced	Sydney, Melbourne, Brisbane, Adelaide, Perth
9Go!	93	24 hours	1080i HDTV (MPEG-4)	Foreign/nationally produced	Sydney, Melbourne, Brisbane, Adelaide, Perth
9Go!	99	24 hours	1080i HDTV (MPEG-4)	Foreign/nationally produced	Sydney, Melbourne, Brisbane, Adelaide, Perth
9Life	94	24 hours	1080i HDTV (MPEG-4)	Lifestyle, foreign/nationally produced	Sydney, Melbourne, Brisbane, Adelaide, Perth
9Rush	96	24 hours	576i SDTV (MPEG-4)	Foreign/nationally produced	Sydney, Melbourne, Brisbane, Adelaide, Perth
Extra	97	24 hours	576i SDTV (MPEG-4; MPEG-2 in Melbourne only)	Datacast, infomercial	Sydney, Melbourne, Brisbane, Adelaide, Perth

=== Paramount Australia & New Zealand ===
DVB name	LCN	Broadcast hours	Format	Programming content	Availability
10	1	24 hours	576i SDTV (MPEG-2)	Primary channel, news bulletins, foreign/nationally produced	Sydney, Melbourne, Brisbane, Adelaide, Perth
10 HD	10	24 hours	1080i HDTV (MPEG-4)	Primary channel, news bulletins, foreign/nationally produced	Sydney, Melbourne, Brisbane, Adelaide, Perth
10 HD	15	24 hours	1080i HDTV (MPEG-4)	Primary channel, news bulletins, foreign/nationally produced	Sydney, Melbourne, Brisbane, Adelaide, Perth
10 Comedy	11	24 hours	1080i HDTV (MPEG-4)	Foreign/nationally produced	Sydney, Melbourne, Brisbane, Adelaide, Perth
10 Drama	12	24 hours	1080i HDTV (MPEG-4)	Foreign/nationally produced	Sydney, Melbourne, Brisbane, Adelaide, Perth
Nickelodeon	13	24 hours	576i SDTV (MPEG-4)	Foreign/nationally produced	Sydney, Melbourne, Brisbane, Adelaide, Perth
10+1	14	24 hours	1080i HDTV (MPEG-4)	Timeshift of 10, primary channel, news bulletins, foreign/nationally produced	Sydney, Melbourne, Brisbane, Adelaide, Perth
you.tv	16	24 hours	576i SDTV (MPEG-4)	Datacast, infomercial	Sydney, Melbourne, Brisbane, Adelaide, Perth
gecko	17	24 hours	576i SDTV (MPEG-4)	Datacast, infomercial	Sydney, Melbourne, Brisbane, Adelaide, Perth

10 Regional
DVB name	LCN	Broadcast hours	Format	Programming content	Availability
10 HD	5	24 hours	1080i HDTV (MPEG-4)	Primary channel, news bulletins, foreign/nationally produced	Regional QLD, Northern NSW, Southern NSW/ACT, Regional VIC
10 HD	50	24 hours	1080i HDTV (MPEG-4)	Primary channel, news bulletins, foreign/nationally produced	Regional QLD, Northern NSW, Southern NSW/ACT, Regional VIC
10 HD	51	24 hours	1080i HDTV (MPEG-4)	Primary channel, news bulletins, foreign/nationally produced	Regional QLD, Southern NSW/ACT, Regional VIC
10 Comedy	52	24 hours	1080i HDTV (MPEG-4)	Foreign/nationally produced	Regional QLD, Northern NSW, Southern NSW/ACT, Regional VIC
10 Drama	53	24 hours	1080i HDTV (MPEG-4)	Foreign/nationally produced	Regional QLD, Northern NSW, Southern NSW/ACT, Regional VIC
Nickelodeon	54	24 hours	576i SDTV (MPEG-4)	Foreign/nationally produced	Regional QLD, Southern NSW/ACT, Regional VIC
SBN	55	24 hours	576i SDTV (MPEG-4)	Datacast, religious	Regional QLD, Southern NSW/ACT, Regional VIC
News24 Regional	56	24 hours	576i SDTV (MPEG-4)	News bulletins	Regional QLD, Northern NSW, Southern NSW/ACT, Regional VIC
gecko	57	24 hours	576i SDTV (MPEG-4)	Datacast, infomercial	Regional QLD, Northern NSW, Southern NSW/ACT, Regional VIC
you.tv	58	24 hours	576i SDTV (MPEG-4)	Datacast, infomercial	Regional QLD, Northern NSW, Southern NSW/ACT, Regional VIC

== Commercial affiliate broadcasters ==
=== WIN Corporation (primary Nine affiliate) ===
DVB name	LCN	Broadcast hours	Format	Programming content	Availability
9HD	8	24 hours	1080i HDTV (MPEG-4)	Primary channel, news bulletins, foreign/nationally produced	Regional QLD, Northern NSW/Gold Coast, Southern NSW/ACT, Regional VIC, Mildura VIC/Sunraysia, Tasmania, Mount Gambier/Riverland, Griffith NSW/Murrumbidgee Irrigation Area
9HD	80	24 hours	1080i HDTV (MPEG-4)	Primary channel, news bulletins, foreign/nationally produced	Regional QLD, Northern NSW/Gold Coast, Southern NSW/ACT, Regional VIC, Mildura VIC/Sunraysia, Tasmania, Mount Gambier/Riverland, Griffith NSW/Murrumbidgee Irrigation Area
9Gem	81	24 hours	1080i HDTV (MPEG-4)	Foreign/nationally produced	Regional QLD, Northern NSW/Gold Coast, Southern NSW/ACT, Regional VIC, Mildura VIC/Sunraysia, Tasmania, Mount Gambier/Riverland, Griffith NSW/Murrumbidgee Irrigation Area
9Go!	82	24 hours	1080i HDTV (MPEG-4)	Foreign/nationally produced	Regional QLD, Northern NSW/Gold Coast, Southern NSW/ACT, Regional VIC, Mildura VIC/Sunraysia, Tasmania, Mount Gambier/Riverland, Griffith NSW/Murrumbidgee Irrigation Area
9Life	83	24 hours	576i SDTV (MPEG-4)	Lifestyle, foreign/nationally produced	Regional QLD, Northern NSW/Gold Coast, Southern NSW/ACT, Regional VIC, Mildura VIC/Sunraysia, Tasmania, Mount Gambier/Riverland, Griffith NSW/Murrumbidgee Irrigation Area
Gold	85	24 hours	576i SDTV (MPEG-4)	Datacast, infomercial	Regional QLD, Northern NSW/Gold Coast, Southern NSW/ACT, Regional VIC, Mildura VIC/Sunraysia, Tasmania, Mount Gambier/Riverland, Griffith NSW/Murrumbidgee Irrigation Area

9 Western Australia
DVB name	LCN	Broadcast hours	Format	Programming content	Availability
9HD	8	24 hours	1080i HDTV (MPEG-4)	Primary channel, news bulletins, foreign/nationally produced	Remote/Regional WA
9HD	80	24 hours	1080i HDTV (MPEG-4)	Primary channel, news bulletins, foreign/nationally produced	Remote/Regional WA
9Gem	81	24 hours	576i SDTV (MPEG-4)	Foreign/nationally produced	Remote/Regional WA
9Go!	82	24 hours	576i SDTV (MPEG-4)	Foreign/nationally produced	Remote/Regional WA
9Life	85	24 hours	576i SDTV (MPEG-4)	Lifestyle, foreign/nationally produced	Remote/Regional WA

9 Darwin
DVB name	LCN	Broadcast hours	Format	Programming content	Availability
9HD	9	24 hours	1080i HDTV (MPEG-4)	Primary channel, news bulletins, foreign/nationally produced	Darwin
9HD	90	24 hours	1080i HDTV (MPEG-4)	Primary channel, news bulletins, foreign/nationally produced	Darwin
9Gem	91	24 hours	1080i HDTV (MPEG-4)	Foreign/nationally produced	Darwin
9Go!	92	24 hours	1080i HDTV (MPEG-4)	Foreign/nationally produced	Darwin
9Life	93	24 hours	576i SDTV (MPEG-4)	Lifestyle, foreign/nationally produced	Darwin

Mount Gambier/Riverland and Griffith monopoly stations
DVB name	LCN	Broadcast hours	Format	Programming content	Availability
7HD SA	6	24 hours	1080i HDTV (MPEG-4)	Primary channel, news bulletins, foreign/nationally produced	Mount Gambier/Riverland
7HD SA	60	24 hours	1080i HDTV (MPEG-4)	Primary channel, news bulletins, foreign/nationally produced	Mount Gambier/Riverland
7HD Griffith	6	24 hours	1080i HDTV (MPEG-4)	Primary channel, news bulletins, foreign/nationally produced	Griffith NSW/Murrumbidgee Irrigation Area
7HD Griffith	60	24 hours	1080i HDTV (MPEG-4)	Primary channel, news bulletins, foreign/nationally produced	Griffith NSW/Murrumbidgee Irrigation Area
7two	62	24 hours	576i SDTV (MPEG-4)	Foreign/nationally produced, news bulletins	Mount Gambier/Riverland, Griffith NSW/Murrumbidgee Irrigation Area
7mate	63	24 hours	1080i HDTV (MPEG-4)	Foreign/nationally produced, news bulletins	Mount Gambier/Riverland, Griffith NSW/Murrumbidgee Irrigation Area

WIN Corporation also co-owns 10 affiliates West Digital Television, Tasmanian Digital Television and Darwin Digital Television (with Seven Media Group).

=== Imparja Television (remote Nine affiliate) ===
DVB name	LCN	Broadcast hours	Format	Programming content	Availability
Imparja	9	24 hours	1080i HDTV (MPEG-4)	Primary channel, news bulletins, foreign/nationally produced	Remote Central/Eastern Australia
9Gem	90	24 hours	576i SDTV (MPEG-4)	Foreign/nationally produced	Remote Central/Eastern Australia
9Go!	99	24 hours	576i SDTV (MPEG-4)	Foreign/nationally produced	Remote Central/Eastern Australia

Imparja Television also co-owns 10 affiliate Central Digital Television (with Seven Media Group).

=== Joint venture stations (10 affiliates) ===
West Digital Television
DVB name	LCN	Broadcast hours	Format	Programming content	Availability
10 HD	5	24 hours	1080i HDTV (MPEG-4)	Primary channel, news bulletins, foreign/nationally produced	Remote/Regional WA
10 Drama	50	24 hours	576i SDTV (MPEG-4)	Foreign/nationally produced	Remote/Regional WA
10 Comedy	55	24 hours	576i SDTV (MPEG-4)	Foreign/nationally produced	Remote/Regional WA

West Digital Television is co-owned by Seven Media Group and Nine affiliate WIN Corporation.

Tasmanian Digital Television
DVB name	LCN	Broadcast hours	Format	Programming content	Availability
10 HD	5	24 hours	1080i HDTV (MPEG-4)	Primary channel, news bulletins, foreign/nationally produced	Tasmania
10 HD	50	24 hours	1080i HDTV (MPEG-4)	Primary channel, news bulletins, foreign/nationally produced	Tasmania
10 Tasmania	51	24 hours	576i SDTV (MPEG-2)	Primary channel, news bulletins, foreign/nationally produced	Tasmania
10 Comedy	52	24 hours	576i SDTV (MPEG-4)	Foreign/nationally produced	Tasmania
10 Drama	53	24 hours	576i SDTV (MPEG-4)	Foreign/nationally produced	Tasmania
Nickelodeon	54	24 hours	576i SDTV (MPEG-4)	Foreign/nationally produced	Tasmania

Tasmanian Digital Television is co-owned by Seven Media Group and Nine affiliate WIN Corporation.

Central Digital Television
DVB name	LCN	Broadcast hours	Format	Programming content	Availability
10 Central	10	24 hours	1080i HDTV (MPEG-4)	Primary channel, news bulletins, foreign/nationally produced	Remote Central/Eastern Australia
10 Drama	1	24 hours	576i SDTV (MPEG-4)	Foreign/nationally produced	Remote Central/Eastern Australia
10 Comedy	11	24 hours	576i SDTV (MPEG-4)	Foreign/nationally produced	Remote Central/Eastern Australia

Central Digital Television is co-owned by Seven Media Group and Nine affiliate Imparja Television.

Darwin Digital Television
DVB name	LCN	Broadcast hours	Format	Programming content	Availability
10 Darwin	1	24 hours	1080i HDTV (MPEG-4)	Primary channel, news bulletins, foreign/nationally produced	Darwin
10 Darwin	10	24 hours	1080i HDTV (MPEG-4)	Primary channel, news bulletins, foreign/nationally produced	Darwin
10 Darwin	11	24 hours	1080i HDTV (MPEG-4)	Primary channel, news bulletins, foreign/nationally produced	Darwin
10 Drama	12	24 hours	576i SDTV (MPEG-4)	Foreign/nationally produced	Darwin
10 Comedy	13	24 hours	576i SDTV (MPEG-4)	Foreign/nationally produced	Darwin

Darwin Digital Television is co-owned by Seven Media Group and Nine affiliate WIN Corporation.

== Local broadcasters ==
=== Open narrowcasting services ===
First Nations Broadcasting Australia
DVB name	LCN	Broadcast hours	Format	Programming content	Availability
First Nations TV	4	24 hours	720p HDTV (MPEG-4)	Aboriginal and Torres Strait Islander content, locally produced	Darwin
Darwin TV	41	24 hours	576i SDTV	News and entertainment, locally produced	Darwin
Tourism TV	42	24 hours	576i SDTV (MPEG-4)	Tourism, locally produced	Darwin
Business TV	43	24 hours	576i SDTV	Education, locally produced	Darwin
First Nations Radio	401	24 hours	Stereo audio	Music radio	Darwin
Darwin FM	402	24 hours	Stereo audio	Music radio	Darwin
First Nations National Radio	403	24 hours	Stereo audio	Music and news radio	Darwin
Palmerston FM88	404	24 hours	Stereo audio	Music radio	Darwin

Goolarri Media Enterprises
DVB name	LCN	Broadcast hours	Format	Programming content	Availability
GTV	40	24 hours	576i SDTV	Locally produced	Broome
Nurlua (ICTV)	41	24 hours	576i SDTV	Locally produced	Broome
GTV HD	42	24 hours	1080i HDTV	Locally produced	Broome
Radio Goolari	43	24 hours	Stereo audio	Music and news radio	Broome
PAKAM Radio	44	24 hours	Stereo audio	Music radio	Broome

Juluwarlu Group Aboriginal Corporation
DVB name	LCN	Broadcast hours	Format	Programming content	Availability
Ngaarda TV	40	24 hours	576i SDTV	Locally produced	Roebourne WA and surrounding areas

Snowy Mountains Television
DVB name	LCN	Broadcast hours	Format	Programming content	Availability
SMTV HD	350	24 hours	1080i HDTV	Locally produced	Jindabyne NSW
SMTV	351	24 hours	576i SDTV	Locally produced	Jindabyne NSW

=== Community television ===
C44 Adelaide
DVB name	LCN	Broadcast hours	Format	Programming content	Availability
Channel 44	44	24 hours	576i SDTV	Locally produced, news bulletins	Adelaide and surrounding areas

Melbourne Community Television Consortium
DVB name	LCN	Broadcast hours	Format	Programming content	Availability
C31 Melbourne	44	24 hours	576i SDTV	Locally produced, news bulletins	Melbourne, Geelong and surrounding areas

=== VAST satellite services ===
Indigenous Community Television
DVB name	LCN	Broadcast hours	Format	Programming content	Availability
ICTV	41	24 hours	576i SDTV	Locally produced, Indigenous	Alice Springs, Broome (via GTV)
ICTV	601	24 hours	576i SDTV	Locally produced, Indigenous	Remote/Regional WA, Remote Central/Eastern Australia

ICTV is available via terrestrial television in Alice Springs and Broome, and via VAST in other areas.

Three Angels Broadcasting Network
DVB name	LCN	Broadcast hours	Format	Programming content	Availability
3ABN Australia	109	24 hours	576i SDTV	Foreign/locally produced, religious	Remote/Regional WA, Remote Central/Eastern Australia
3ABN Australia	603	24 hours	576i SDTV	Foreign/locally produced, religious	Remote/Regional WA, Remote Central/Eastern Australia

Angel Christian Television Trust
DVB name	LCN	Broadcast hours	Format	Programming content	Availability
GOD TV	101	24 hours	576i SDTV	Foreign/locally produced, religious	Remote/Regional WA, Remote Central/Eastern Australia
GOD TV	677	24 hours	576i SDTV	Foreign/locally produced, religious	Remote/Regional WA, Remote Central/Eastern Australia

Trinity Broadcasting Network
DVB name	LCN	Broadcast hours	Format	Programming content	Availability
TBN Pacific	104	24 hours	576i SDTV	Foreign/locally produced, religious	Remote/Regional WA, Remote Central/Eastern Australia
TBN Pacific	624	24 hours	576i SDTV	Foreign/locally produced, religious	Remote/Regional WA, Remote Central/Eastern Australia
TBN Inspire	105	24 hours	576i SDTV	Foreign/locally produced, religious	Remote/Regional WA, Remote Central/Eastern Australia
TBN Inspire	625	24 hours	576i SDTV	Foreign/locally produced, religious	Remote/Regional WA, Remote Central/Eastern Australia

Jimmy Swaggart Ministries
DVB name	LCN	Broadcast hours	Format	Programming content	Availability
SBN	106	24 hours	576i SDTV	Foreign produced, religious	Remote/Regional WA, Remote Central/Eastern Australia
SBN	616	24 hours	576i SDTV	Foreign produced, religious	Remote/Regional WA, Remote Central/Eastern Australia

Angel Broadcasting Network
DVB name	LCN	Broadcast hours	Format	Programming content	Availability
Angel TV	107	24 hours	576i SDTV	Foreign/locally produced, religious	Remote/Regional WA, Remote Central/Eastern Australia
Angel TV	617	24 hours	576i SDTV	Foreign/locally produced, religious	Remote/Regional WA, Remote Central/Eastern Australia

Seventh-day Adventist Church
DVB name	LCN	Broadcast hours	Format	Programming content	Availability
Hope Channel	110	24 hours	576i SDTV	Foreign produced, religious	Remote/Regional WA, Remote Central/Eastern Australia
Hope Channel	610	24 hours	576i SDTV	Foreign produced, religious	Remote/Regional WA, Remote Central/Eastern Australia

Amazing Discoveries Ministries
DVB name	LCN	Broadcast hours	Format	Programming content	Availability
ADTV	111	24 hours	576i SDTV	Foreign/locally produced, religious	Remote/Regional WA, Remote Central/Eastern Australia
ADTV	611	24 hours	576i SDTV	Foreign/locally produced, religious	Remote/Regional WA, Remote Central/Eastern Australia

== Discontinued channels ==
DVB name	LCN	Launch date	Discontinued date	Notes
ABC Kids	21	1 August 2001	30 June 2003	Youth focused sister channels. ABC Kids aired 6am to 6pm, Fly TV aired 6pm to 6am. Axed due to budget cuts. Replaced by ABC2 in 2005 (now ABC Family).
Fly TV	21	1 November 2001	30 June 2003	Youth focused sister channels. ABC Kids aired 6am to 6pm, Fly TV aired 6pm to 6am. Axed due to budget cuts. Replaced by ABC2 in 2005 (now ABC Family).
SBS Essential	31	14 October 2002	25 January 2007	Program guide channel.
Ten Guide	11	1 July 2004	20 November 2007	Program guide channel. Replaced by Ten SD2 on channel 11, channel 100 simply went blank and this LCN number was not used again for a future channel.
Ten Guide	100	1 July 2004	20 November 2007	Program guide channel. Replaced by Ten SD2 on channel 11, channel 100 simply went blank and this LCN number was not used again for a future channel.
ABC Guide	20	30 May 2006	8 February 2008	Program guide channel aired during off-air periods of ABC HD and ABC2 (now ABC Family).
ABC Guide	21	30 May 2006	8 February 2008	Program guide channel aired during off-air periods of ABC HD and ABC2 (now ABC Family).
MyTalk	55	13 April 2007	25 February 2008	Program guide channel in regional Southern Cross Ten and Southern Cross Television areas. LCN 55 was used again for Eleven in Southern Cross Ten areas in 2011 and Yesshop in 2016. LCN 66 was used again for Aspire TV in Tasmania (Southern Cross Television) in 2013. LCN 77 was never used by Southern Cross ever again, until gecko launched in Darwin on 1 July 2023.
MyTalk	66	13 April 2007	25 February 2008	Program guide channel in regional Southern Cross Ten and Southern Cross Television areas. LCN 55 was used again for Eleven in Southern Cross Ten areas in 2011 and Yesshop in 2016. LCN 66 was used again for Aspire TV in Tasmania (Southern Cross Television) in 2013. LCN 77 was never used by Southern Cross ever again, until gecko launched in Darwin on 1 July 2023.
MyTalk	77	13 April 2007	25 February 2008	Program guide channel in regional Southern Cross Ten and Southern Cross Television areas. LCN 55 was used again for Eleven in Southern Cross Ten areas in 2011 and Yesshop in 2016. LCN 66 was used again for Aspire TV in Tasmania (Southern Cross Television) in 2013. LCN 77 was never used by Southern Cross ever again, until gecko launched in Darwin on 1 July 2023.
Seven Guide	77	6 September 2002	4 July 2008	Program guide channel.
Nine Guide	99	21 August 2001	13 November 2008	Program guide channel. Replaced by a simulcast of Nine until 5 August 2009, when it was replaced by GO! (now 9Go!).
Ten SD2	11	16 December 2007	25 March 2009	SD simulcast of Ten HD. Replaced by One SD in 2009.
SBS World News Channel	32	12 June 2002	1 June 2009	Broadcast on LCN 33 until 29 January 2009. Replaced by SBS Two (now SBS Viceland).
One SD	12	26 March 2009	15 December 2010	SD simulcast of One HD (now One). Replaced by a HD simulcast of One HD (previously on LCN 11, replaced by Eleven).
3D trials	40	19 May 2010	19 July 2010	Shared 3D broadcasts of the 2010 State of Origin series by Nine Network (and affiliates WIN Television and NBN Television) and SBS Television. Available in Sydney, Melbourne, Brisbane, Adelaide, Perth (for Nine and SBS's 3D trials), Newcastle (for NBN's 3D trial), Wollongong (for WIN's 3D trial).
3D trials	40	25 September 2010		3D broadcast of the 2010 AFL Grand Final by the Seven Network. Available in Sydney, Melbourne, Brisbane, Adelaide and Perth.
3D trials	95	16 July 2012	23 August 2012	3D highlights broadcast of Nine's coverage of the 2012 Summer Olympics. Available in Sydney, Melbourne, Brisbane, Adelaide, Perth and Gold Coast. Replaced by Extra 2 in 2013. It is currently 9Gem HD since 2019.
Gold 2	92	13 July 2013	30 September 2013	Five-hour timeshift of Gold. Replaced by Extra (later moved to LCN 85). In Perth, Nine Entertainment took control of STW, which was the only non-regional station to carry Gold 2, on 30 September 2013, so Nine's second infomercial channel Extra 2 (on LCN 95) replaced Gold 2 in Perth.
Gold 2	82	13 July 2013	19 January 2016	Five-hour timeshift of Gold. Replaced by Extra (later moved to LCN 85). In Perth, Nine Entertainment took control of STW, which was the only non-regional station to carry Gold 2, on 30 September 2013, so Nine's second infomercial channel Extra 2 (on LCN 95) replaced Gold 2 in Perth.
Rural Health Channel	600	21 May 2012	January 2014	VAST channel.
Fresh Ideas TV	78	22 November 2013	1 December 2014	Infomercial datacast broadcast by Seven in metropolitan markets and its Regional Queensland station. Replaced by Racing.com in 2015. It is still Racing.com to this day.
Fresh Ideas TV	68	22 November 2013	1 December 2014	Infomercial datacast broadcast by Seven in metropolitan markets and its Regional Queensland station. Replaced by Racing.com in 2015. It is still Racing.com to this day.
Aspire TV	66	21 May 2013	29 August 2015	Infomercial datacast broadcast by Southern Cross Austereo. Replaced by and currently Racing.com in Southern Cross Television areas.
Aspire TV	76	21 May 2013	29 August 2015	Infomercial datacast broadcast by Southern Cross Austereo. Replaced by and currently Racing.com in Southern Cross Television areas.
Aspire TV	56	21 May 2013	1 July 2016	Infomercial datacast broadcast by Southern Cross Austereo. Replaced by Sky News Regional (now News24) in Southern Cross 10 areas. In the Broken Hill and Spencer Gulf areas, this channel was broadcast on SGS/SCN, this channel ceased to broadcast in those areas on 1 July 2016 and this channel was not replaced in those areas. This is also the case in Northern NSW, because Southern Cross' Northern NSW station NRN was acquired by rival regional television network WIN Television on 31 May 2017, so Aspire TV ceased to broadcast in Northern NSW on 31 August 2017.
Aspire TV	56	21 May 2013	31 August 2017	
Aspire TV	56	21 May 2013	1 August 2021	
Extra 2	95	28 March 2013	26 November 2015	Five-hour timeshift of Extra. Replaced by Extra (moved from LCN 94 and 84 respectively). It is currently 9Gem HD since 2019.
Extra 2	85	28 March 2013	1 March 2016	Five-hour timeshift of Extra. Replaced by Extra (moved from LCN 94 and 84 respectively). It is currently 9Gem HD since 2019.
4ME	64	18 September 2011	30 April 2016	Infomercial datacast. Replaced by a simulcast of ishop TV, discontinued June 2016.
4ME	74	December 2011	19 May 2016	Infomercial datacast. Prime Media Group and Brand New Media datacast channel broadcast by Seven into metropolitan markets and its regional Queensland station. Replaced by 7food network in 2018 and currently a HD version of 7mate.
4ME	64	December 2011	19 May 2016	Infomercial datacast. Prime Media Group and Brand New Media datacast channel broadcast by Seven into metropolitan markets and its regional Queensland station. Replaced by 7food network in 2018 and currently a HD version of 7mate.
Yesshop	55	4 November 2013	29 September 2016	Infomercial datacast. New Zealand-based channel broadcast by Southern Cross Austereo. NZ owner folded due to company losses and lack of funds. Replaced by SBN in 2017.
Yesshop	64	4 November 2013	29 September 2016	Infomercial datacast. New Zealand-based channel broadcast by Southern Cross Austereo. NZ owner folded due to company losses and lack of funds. Replaced by SBN in 2017.
Yesshop	74	4 November 2013	29 September 2016	Infomercial datacast. New Zealand-based channel broadcast by Southern Cross Austereo. NZ owner folded due to company losses and lack of funds. Replaced by SBN in 2017.
Yesshop	54	4 November 2013	29 September 2016	Infomercial datacast. New Zealand-based channel broadcast by Southern Cross Austereo. NZ owner folded due to company losses and lack of funds. Replaced by SBN in 2017.
Westlink	602	1992	16 December 2017	VAST channel.
Your Money	95	1 October 2018	17 May 2019	Business news joint-venture between Australian News Channel and Nine Entertainment Co. Replaced by an HD simulcast of 9Gem.
Your Money	85	1 October 2018	17 May 2019	Business news joint-venture between Australian News Channel and Nine Entertainment Co. Replaced by an HD simulcast of 9Gem.
7food network	74	1 December 2018	28 December 2019	Food channel broadcast by Seven West Media. Replaced by a HD simulcast of 7mate.
7food network	64	1 December 2018	28 December 2019	Food channel broadcast by Seven West Media. Replaced by a HD simulcast of 7mate.
Sky News on WIN	83	2 September 2018	1 August 2021	News channel co-owned by Australian News Channel and WIN Corporation. Replaced by 9Life in WIN Nine areas.
Sky News on WIN	85	2 September 2018	1 August 2021	News channel co-owned by Australian News Channel and WIN Corporation. Replaced by 9Life in WIN Nine areas.
Sky News on WIN	53	2 September 2018	1 August 2021	News channel co-owned by Australian News Channel and WIN Corporation. Replaced by Sky News Regional (now News24) in WIN 10 areas.
Open Shop	75	1 August 2019	7 September 2021	Infomercial datacast co-owned by Seven West Media and Hyundai Home Shopping and broadcast in metropolitan markets and regional Queensland. Replaced by 7Bravo in 2023.
Open Shop	65	1 August 2019	7 September 2021	Infomercial datacast co-owned by Seven West Media and Hyundai Home Shopping and broadcast in metropolitan markets and regional Queensland. Replaced by 7Bravo in 2023.
Spree TV	17	17 September 2013	12 August 2022	Infomercial datacast co-owned by Ten Network Holdings and Brand Developers. Replaced by Gecko.
ishop TV	67	30 April 2013	1 April 2024	Infomercial datacast co-owned by Seven West Media and Brand Developers. Broadcast in Southern NSW/ACT, Northern NSW, Regional Victoria and Mildura. Replaced by TVSN.
SBS WorldWatch	35	23 May 2022	18 September 2026	World news channel. Content moved to SBS On Demand.
TVSN	77	24 September 2012	15 November 2026	Infomercial datacast owned by Direct Group Pty Ltd and broadcast via Seven's multiplex. Closed due to not finding a new owner.
TVSN	67	24 September 2012	15 November 2026	Infomercial datacast owned by Direct Group Pty Ltd and broadcast via Seven's multiplex. Closed due to not finding a new owner.
TVSN	65	1 July 2024	15 November 2026	Infomercial datacast owned by Direct Group Pty Ltd and broadcast via Seven's multiplex. Closed due to not finding a new owner.
TVSN	75	1 July 2024	15 November 2026	Infomercial datacast owned by Direct Group Pty Ltd and broadcast via Seven's multiplex. Closed due to not finding a new owner.

=== Digital Forty Four ===
The following channels were only available in Sydney as the Digital Forty Four suite of channels. The datacast trial began on 17 March 2004 and ended on 30 April 2010.

Channel lineup prior to trial end
DVB name	LCN	Launch date	Discontinued date	Notes
Channel 4	4	2008	30 April 2010	Video program guide for free-to-air and D44 channels.
NITV	40	27 October 2008	30 April 2010	Existing subscription channel added to D44 service. Remains available on subscription satellite and cable television. Available free-to-air on LCN 34 via SBS since 12 December 2012.
ABC News, Sport and Weather	41	17 March 2004	30 April 2010	Text only.
D44 Homepage	42	17 March 2004	30 April 2010	Broadcast on LCN 44 prior to addition of TVS in March 2010.
Television Sydney	44	March 2010	30 April 2010	Existing digital community television channel added to D44 service.
Teachers TV	45	3 November 2008	30 April 2010	Broadcast on LCN 47 (shared with House of Representatives channel) until 30 June 2009.
Australian Christian Channel	46	2004	30 April 2010	Existing subscription channel added to D44 service. Still available on subscription satellite and cable television. Broadcast on LCN 47 (shared with House of Representatives channel) until 30 June 2009.
Federal Parliament House of Representatives	47	17 March 2004	30 April 2010	Live video/audio feed of House of Representatives sessions. Broadcast on LCN 401 until 3 November 2008, LCN 47 shared with Teachers TV from 2008 to 2009 (broadcast when the House was not in session).
Federal Parliament Senate	48	17 March 2004	30 April 2010	Live video/audio feed of Senate sessions. Broadcast on LCN 402 until 3 November 2008.
Expo	49	2006	30 April 2010	Existing subscription shopping channel added to D44 service. Still available on Foxtel subscription television.

=== Discontinued stations ===
DVB name	LCN	Launch date	Discontinued date	Notes
Television Sydney	44	20 February 2006	20 December 2015	Community television serving Sydney, Southern Highlands, Blue Mountains, Illawarra and Central Coast.
31 Digital	44	31 July 1994	30 April 2019	Community television serving Brisbane and surrounding areas. Reinvented as online streaming service Hitchhike TV, closed in 2019.
West TV	44	10 April 1996	20 February 2020	Community television serving Perth and surrounding areas.
10 Mildura	5	1 January 2006	30 June 2024	Affiliate of Network Ten (2006–16), Nine Network (2016–21) and Network 10 (2021–24), serving the Mildura/Sunraysia region. Co-owned by Seven West Media and WIN Corporation. Closed due to continued financial losses.
10 Mildura	50	1 January 2006	30 June 2024	Affiliate of Network Ten (2006–16), Nine Network (2016–21) and Network 10 (2021–24), serving the Mildura/Sunraysia region. Co-owned by Seven West Media and WIN Corporation. Closed due to continued financial losses.
10 SA	5	1 January 2004	9 October 2026	Supplementary licenses owned by WIN Corporation affiliated to Network 10, serving the Griffith and Mount Gambier/Riverland regions. Closed due to continued financial losses and the unrenewal of Paramount's supply agreement.
10 SA	50	1 January 2004	9 October 2026	Supplementary licenses owned by WIN Corporation affiliated to Network 10, serving the Griffith and Mount Gambier/Riverland regions. Closed due to continued financial losses and the unrenewal of Paramount's supply agreement.
10 Griffith	5	13 January 2012	9 October 2026	Supplementary licenses owned by WIN Corporation affiliated to Network 10, serving the Griffith and Mount Gambier/Riverland regions. Closed due to continued financial losses and the unrenewal of Paramount's supply agreement.
10 Griffith	50	13 January 2012	9 October 2026	Supplementary licenses owned by WIN Corporation affiliated to Network 10, serving the Griffith and Mount Gambier/Riverland regions. Closed due to continued financial losses and the unrenewal of Paramount's supply agreement.

== See also ==
- Australian and New Zealand television frequencies
- Digital television in Australia
- Internet television in Australia
