= Guide (disambiguation) =

A guide is a person with specialized knowledge that helps laypersons travel through an area.

Guide or The Guide may also refer to:

== Occupations ==
- Girl guide, a female member of a scouting organisation
- Museum docent, a guide at a museum, university or heritage place
- Sighted guide, a person who guides a person who is blind or partially sighted
  - Guide dog, assistance dogs trained to lead blind and vision impaired people around obstacles
- Tracker (occupation), an individual who can follow the path left behind by animals, people or machines

== Reference works ==
- Compendium, a work intended to summarize human knowledge in a particular field
- Encyclopedia, a work intended to summarize the whole of human knowledge
- Field guide, a reference for quickly identifying organisms or objects
- Guidebook, a book that summarize attractions for tourists
- Guide to information sources, a work summarizing the important sources in a particular field
- Knowledge management database
- User guide, a book instructing a person how to use a product
- Price guide, a reference work containing prices of e.g. coins, collectibles, computers
- Study guide, a document intended to foster comprehension of literature, research topics, history, or other subjects

== Media with the title ==
- Guide (Adventist magazine), a weekly publication for 10- to 14-year-olds
- The Guide, a novel by R. K. Narayan, an Indian author
  - Guide (film), a Hindi film based on the novel
- The Guide (film), a 2014 Ukrainian film
- The Guide (Wommat), a 1994 album by Youssou N'Dour
- Guide (magazine), a Philippine religious bimonthly magazine published by the Sonshine Media Network International
- The Guide, renamed WOW247, an entertainment supplement of The News (Portsmouth)
- "The Guide", a 2016 song by Kid Cudi from Passion, Pain & Demon Slayin'
- Seven Guide, a defunct Australian television channel
- Nine Guide, a defunct Australian television channel
- Ten Guide, a defunct Australian television channel

== Places ==
- Guide, Henan, a former name of Shangqiu in Henan, China
- Guide County in Qinghai, China
- Guide, Lancashire, a village in England
- Guide, Mirandela, a village in Portugal
- Guide River, New Zealand
- The Guides, two islands off South Georgia
- Washington State Route 539, officially named the Guide Meridian Road, commonly known as "The Guide"

== Ships ==
- Guide, a New Zealand Company teak-built Calcutta pilot brig wrecked in 1846
- Guide (ship), a convict ship that transported six convicts from Calcutta, India to Fremantle, Western Australia in 1855
- USC&GS Guide (1918), an American survey ship in service from 1923 to 1941
- USC&GS Guide (1929), an American survey ship in service from 1941 to 1942
- USS Guide (AMc-83), a US Navy minesweeper launched in 1941
- USS Guide (AM-447), a US Navy minesweeper launched in 1954

== Technology ==
- In mechanical design, something that steadies or directs the motion of an object, for example:
  - Guide rail
  - The “leading” screw of a screw-cutting lathe
  - A loose pulley used to steady a driving-belt
- Electronic program guide, an on-screen guide to scheduled broadcast television programs
  - Guide Plus, an interactive electronic programme guide system
- Guide (hypertext), the first commercially sold hypertext system, now unused
- Guide (software company), a software company that designs an app for changing text into streaming audio and video
- GUIDE International, a defunct IBM computer user group

== See also ==
- Guidance (disambiguation)
- Indian Guides (disambiguation)
- Girl Guides (disambiguation)
- Corps of Guides (disambiguation)
- Pioneer (disambiguation)
- Mentor (disambiguation)
