= List of charities established by Australian athletes =

Australian athletes have established non-for-profit foundations to assist a range of causes including sporting opportunities, medical research, social disadvantage, disability and indigenous development. Several foundations have been established as a result of family members suffering certain medical conditions. It is argued that these athletes are giving back to the community and are good role models. Some of the foundations have closed due to difficulties in fund raising and accountability issues in financial management.

== List of Charities ==
List of charities established by Australian athletes or in honour of them.

Name	Description
Bradman Foundation	Established in 1987 with the support of Sir Donald Bradman to promote cricket as a valuable cultural and supporting force in the community.
Ponting Foundation	Cricketer Ricky Ponting established the Foundation in 2008 "to provide funding for a wide range of essential services that comfort and nurture young Australians with cancer while providing emotional support and financial assistance for their family".
Shane Warne Foundation	Launched by cricketer Shane Warne officially launched in 2004 to enrich the lives of seriously ill and underprivileged children and teenagers in Australia. In January 2016, it was announced that it was being shut-down due to "unwarranted speculation" about its distribution of funds.
Steve Waugh Foundation	Established by cricketer Steve Waugh to support children and young adults (0-25yrs) with the rarest diseases.
David Hookes Foundation	Foundation was established in 2004 as a result of the death of cricketer David Hookes. It aims to inspire more Australians to register as organ donors and to encourage them to discuss their important decision with family and friends.
McGrath Foundation	Established by in 2005 by cricket player, Glenn McGrath, and his English-born wife, Jane McGrath to "raise money to place McGrath Breast Care Nurses in communities across Australia as well as to increase breast awareness in young people."
Dennis Lillee Disabled Sports Foundation	Established in 1989 by cricketer Dennis Lillee, it is the fundraising arm of the West Australian Disabled Sports Association and provides support and coaching and training facilities to West Australian athletes with disabilities.
Ricky Stuart Foundation	Established by rugby league player and coach Ricky Stuart in 2011. Its aim is raise enough funds to directly support the after-care for autistic people and help families.
Reach Foundation	Established in 1994 by AFL player Jim Stynes and film director, Paul Currie to inspire young people to believe in themselves and get the most out of life.
Evonne Goolagong Foundation	Established in 2012 by tennis player Evonne Goolagong-Cawley, the Foundation supports young indigenous people who have the potential to play at the elite level and make a career in tennis either as a player, coach or administrator.
Layne Beachley Foundation 'Aim For The Stars'	Established by world surfing champion Layne Beachley to inspire girls and women across Australia to dream and achieve.
Waalitj Foundation	Formerly known as the Wirrpanda Foundation. Established in 2005 by AFL player David Wirrpanda to "increase the retention of Aboriginal students in school, improve their health and lifestyle choices and encourage further study or entry into the workforce."
Cathy Freeman Foundation	Established by Australian athletics gold Medallist Cathy Freeman in 2007 to assist "help Indigenous children and their families recognise the power of education and achieve their goals and dreams".
Go Foundation	Established in 2009 by AFL players Adam Goodes and Michael O'Loughlin it aims to "provide Indigenous children with scholarships to quality schools, and to meet expenses for students attending these schools'.
Arthur Beetson Foundation	Established by Arthur Beetson's son to help helping young Aboriginal children kids achieve their sporting and academic dreams.
E.J Whitten Foundation	Established in 1995 honour Ted Whitten and to raise funds for prostate cancer and to promote awareness of this disease. E. J. Whitten Legends Game is held as part of the fund raising program.
Men of League Foundation	Established in 2002 by rugby league greats Jim Hall, Max Brown and Ron Coote, it has "provided support and assistance to rugby league players, coaches, referees, officials and administrators from all levels of the game and their families.'
Cherish the Children Foundation	Established by tennis player Pat Rafter to help emotionally, mentally, and physically challenged children. It closed in 2011 due to increasing competition for the charity dollar.
Clontarf Foundation	Established in 2000 by former coach of Fremantle Football Club Gerard Neesham to "exists to improve the education, discipline, life skills, self-esteem and employment prospects of young Aboriginal men and by doing so equips them to participate meaningfully in society".
Team Ladder	Established by AFL players in 2007 to tackle youth homelessness in Australia.
Gasnier Foundation	Established in 2011 by rugby league player Mark Gasnier to purchase PET (Positron Emission Tomography) scanners for Sydney hospitals.
Luke Priddis Foundation	Established in 2006 by rugby league player Luke Priddis to raise funds to improve services to families with austic children.
Mark Hughes Foundation	Established by rugby league player Mark Hughes and Kirralee Hughres in 2013 to "raise much needed funds to promote research, heighten awareness and support brain cancer patients and their families within the community."
John Maclean Foundation	Established by Australian Paralympian John Maclean "to change the lives of young Australians who use wheelchairs."
Roger Rasheed Sports Foundation	Established by tennis player Roger Rasheed to "works with some of the most disadvantaged communities to provide children with a better life pathway through access to sport.'
Indigenous Marathon Foundation	Established by marathon runner Robert de Castella aims promote healthy and active lifestyles throughout Indigenous communities nationally and to reduce the incidence of Indigenous disease; and to create Indigenous role models and inspire Indigenous people.
Kids Tennis Foundation	Originally established in 1983 as Oz Tennis by Paul McNamee aims to "provide every child in every disadvantaged primary school in Australia with the opportunity to play tennis".
Maddie Riewoldt's Vision	Established in 2015 by AFL player Nick Riewoldt and his family to "help adolescents and young adults suffering from Bone Marrow Failure Syndromes through research and providing support into treatments."
Bachar Houli Academy	Established by AFL player Bachar Houli to "giving opportunities and providing a pathway for young Muslim men aspiring to play AFL football".
Footys4All Foundation	An Australian foundation that aims to "supply new sporting balls from all codes (footballs, basketballs, soccer balls, etc.) to disadvantaged, underprivileged and socially displaced children around the world free of charge."
Sporting Dreams	Established by Paralympic swimmer Marayke Jonkers in 2008, it aims to assist "people with physical disabilities to enjoy fun, fitness and personal development through sport and to achieve their sporting dreams."
Wally Foreman Foundation	Established by Lyn Foreman and her family to honour Wally Foreman and to provide assistance to elite and potential elite athlete and coaches in Western Australia.
Tristan Knowles Kids for Cancer Foundation	Established by wheelchair basketballer Tristan Knowles to assist children who are diagnosed with cancer through its Chance To Achieve Scholarship program.
Sport Matters	Established by Australian Paralympian Liesl Tesch and Jackie Lauff that "works in partnership with community organisations and wherever possible develops new partnerships between aid and development organisations, sporting organisations at all levels, and community organisations".
Amy Gillett Foundation	Established after the road accident death of cyclist Amy Gillett. it is "driven by a core mission to reduce the incidence of death and injury of bike riders."
Ian Thorpe's Fountain for Youth	Established by swimmer Ian Thorpe in 2000 "to prevent and control illness in children, particularly Aboriginal or Torres Strait Islanders, and focused on literacy". In announcing its liquidation in 2014, Thorpe stated "many years of sharp budget cuts to Indigenous education programs and organisations have convinced us that now we must work directly with our Aboriginal partners and not compete for the meagre funding available from public and corporate donations."
Finnan's Gift	Established by Australian freestyle skier gold medallist Alisa Camplin and her husband Oliver Warner to raise money to buy equipment for Royal Children's Hospital that will detect heart defects in babies.
Sport Access Foundation	Established by Paralympic triathlete Katie Kelly to assist people with a disability with access to sport and recreational facilities.
Stockwell Foundation	Established by Olympic swimmers Mark Stockwell and his wife Tracy Stockwell to assist at risk children.
The Chappell Foundation	Established by Australian cricketer Greg Chappell to support homeless people, or anyone generally who suffers disadvantage.
Dylan Alcott Foundation	Established in 2017 by Australian Paralympian Dylan Alcott to assist young Australians with disabilities gain self-esteem and respect through sport and study.
George Gregan Foundation
Women in League
