= Indian scout =

Indian scout or Indian Scout may refer to:

- A reconnaissance, soldier or paramilitary that operates in the bush, or from a native population
- Historically, a Native American skilled in tracking
- United States Army Indian Scouts
- Indian Scout (motorcycle), a motorcycle built by the Indian Motorcycle Company
- a boy scout or girl scout who is American Indian, see American Indian Scouting Association
- a boy scout or girl scout from India, see Scouting and Guiding in India
- Ladakh Scouts, an infantry regiment of the Indian Army
- Davy Crockett, Indian Scout, 1950 Western film
- "Indian Scout" (Gunsmoke), a 1956 television episode

== See also ==
- Indian (disambiguation)
- Scout (disambiguation)
- Indian Guides (disambiguation)
- Indian auxiliaries
