= Guidance =

Guidance may refer to:

== Arts and media ==
- Guidance (album), by American instrumental rock band Russian Circles
- Guidance (film), a Canadian comedy film released in 2014
- Guidance (web series), a 2015–2017 American web series
- "Guidance", an episode of Death Note
- Guidance Recordings, a record label

== Other uses ==
- Guidance (finance), a corporation's prediction of its near-future profit or loss
- Guidance system, devices used for navigation
- Guidance Solutions, an eCommerce development company
- Guidance Software, a company that provides software for digital investigations

== See also ==
- Advice (disambiguation)
- Guide (disambiguation)
- Guiding (disambiguation)
