= USC&GS Guide =

USC&GS Guide was the name of two United States Coast and Geodetic Survey ships, and may refer to:

- USC&GS Guide (1918), a survey ship in service from 1923 to 1941
- USC&GS Guide (1929), a survey ship in service from 1941 to 1942
