= Indian Guides =

Indian Guides or Indian guides, or variants of these terms, may refer to:

- a guide for the bush, or from a native population
- an Indian guide (Spanish), allied auxiliaries of Spanish conquistadors

Military

- Corps of Guides (India)

Children's guiding

- YMCA Indian Guides, the former name of Adventure Guides, an outdoor youth program
- a girl guide/scout in/from India, see Scouting and Guiding in India
- a girl guide/scout who is American Indian, see American Indian Scouting Association

Other

- the 1927 Indian Guide Monument, a monument in Peabody, Kansas, USA

== See also ==
- Indian (disambiguation)
- Guide (disambiguation)
- Indian scout (disambiguation)
