= SBS Radio and Television Youth Orchestra =

- Youth orchestra
- Short name: SBS Youth Orchestra
- Founded: 1988; 38 years ago
- Disbanded: 2013; 13 years ago
- Location: Sydney, Australia
- Concert hall: Sydney Opera House; Sydney Town Hall
- Principal conductor: Various (see below)
- Music director: Joanna Drimatis (2010)

The SBS Radio and Television Youth Orchestra (SBS Youth Orchestra) located in Sydney, was one of the premier youth orchestras of Australia. It was founded in 1988 by the Russian-born conductor Matthew Krel, who died in 2009. It was disbanded in 2013.

From its inception it provided young musicians with extensive exposure to media publicity: the orchestra has made 30 TV programs and five CDs and has been aired on ABC Classic FM. As well as being broadcast on television and radio nationwide, it had a challenging concert schedule, performing at venues such as the Sydney Opera House and Sydney Town Hall every year.

The orchestra toured internationally, giving its members opportunities to showcase their repertoire abroad and experience different cultural environments. Since 1993 it toured New Zealand, Tonga, Taiwan, New Caledonia, Germany, Austria, France, Italy, Malta, Czech Republic, Slovakia, Hungary, Japan, Estonia, Finland, Russia, the People's Republic of China, Spain, Hong Kong and Macau.

The members of the orchestra were aged from 12 to 25 and came from a variety of cultural backgrounds. They worked with many international artists, including Giuseppe Giglio (Italy), Roman Rudnytsky (USA), Jansyk Kakhidze (Georgia), Christina Ortiz (England), Dimka Ashkenazy (England), and Liam O'Flynn (Ireland). The Australian artists they performed with include Horst Hoffmann, Myer Fredman, Kathryn Selby, Donald Hazelwood, Marilyn Meier, Dene Olding, Don Burrows, James Morrison, Geoffrey Collins, Nicole Youl, Elizabeth Whitehouse, Rosario La Spina, Judy Bailey, Chris Shepard, Stephen Mould and Simon Tedeschi.

In November 2013, the Board announced the disbanding of the orchestra, and the endowment of a position in the Fellowship Program, one of the main education programs of the Sydney Symphony Orchestra, in perpetual remembrance of Matthew Krel. The orchestra's final performance was on 1 December 2013, at the Joan Sutherland Performing Arts Centre in Penrith, New South Wales under the baton of Simon Thew.

== Key facts ==
- Established in 1988.
- Founding Conductor and Artistic Director: Matthew Krel (1945-2009)
- Orchestral Manager/Assistant Conductor: Simon Thew (-2008)
- Orchestral Manager: Fatima De Assis (2008-)
- Honorary Secretary: Ian Hamilton
- Musical Director: Joanna Drimatis (2010)
- Conductors 2009: Simon Thew, Robert Johnson, Ronald Prussing
- Conductors 2010: Simon Thew, Geoff Gartner and Joanna Drimatis
- Guest Conductors 2011: Simon Thew, Geoff Gartner and Carolyn Watson
- Guest conductors 2012: Thomas Tsai, Geoff Gartner and Simon Thew
- Chief Conductor: Thomas Tsai (2013), guest Simon Thew
- Disbanded 2013. Final concert 1 December 2013, Joan Sutherland Performing Arts Centre, Penrith.

== See also ==
- List of youth orchestras
