= Corps of Guides =

Corps of Guides may refer to:

- Corps of Guides (India) - a unit raised in 1846 in Peshawar by Lt. Harry Lumsden
  - Guides Cavalry, a Pakistani armoured unit descended from the British Empire unit
  - Guides Infantry, a Pakistani foot unit descended from the British Empire unit
- Corps of Guides (Canada)
- Corps of Mounted Guides (Portugal)

== See also ==
- Guides Regiment, Belgian armoured unit
