= Rural Health Education Foundation =

Australian foundation

- Formation: 1992
- Type: Not-for-profit organisation
- Headquarters: Deakin, Australian Capital Territory
- Key people: Dr Brian Bowring, Chair; Don Perlgut, CEO
- Website: www.rhef.com.au

The Rural Health Education Foundation was an Australian provider of television-based health education for doctors, pharmacists, nurses and allied health professionals.

The Foundation provided independent distance education services to general practitioners and other health professionals working in rural and remote Australia. This can assist in reducing levels of professional isolation often experienced by doctors in rural and remote Australia.

The Rural Health Education Foundation also provided community educational resources, paying particular attention to the health, medical and education needs of Aboriginal and Torres Strait Islander People.

The foundation closed in 2014.

== Background ==
Founded in 1992, the Rural Health Education Foundation is a non-government, not-for-profit organisation that provides an education and information "lifeline to the bush", targeting Australia's rural and remote health professionals as well as the communities in which they serve.

== Program production ==
The Rural Health Education Foundation has produced several hundred health-themed educational television programs covering a broad range of subjects including Aged Care, Obstetrics, Infection Control, Child and Adolescent Health, Continence, Mental Health, Oncology, Nursing, and health issues for Aboriginal and Torres Strait Islander People.

Foundation-produced programs are designed to address the unique education and information needs of medical practitioners, health workers and communities in rural and remote Australia.

The programs, which are all accredited by relevant professional organisations, feature presentations from medical and health professionals, usually including at least one rural health professional, who are leaders in their disciplines, and allow for input from the target audience on material presented.

== Program distribution ==
The primary distribution mechanism for Foundation-produced programs is the Rural Health Satellite Network, an Australia-wide network of more than 660 satellite TV receiving sites. The Rural Health Education Foundation's satellite network is one of the largest dedicated networks of its kind in the world, reaching more than 90 per cent of Australia's rural doctors and other health professionals.

Several programs produced by the Foundation have also been aired on Australia's SBS TV network, the Australian Broadcasting Corporation’s television service to the Asia Pacific region, and on National Indigenous Television, and shown at health-themed conferences around Australia. In June 2010 the Foundation's Outback Healers and Heroines program, about women GPs who are passionately committed to rural practice, had its world premiere on SBS TV. This was the first time a Foundation-produced program was broadcast on an external network before airing on the Foundation's own satellite network.

In addition, streamed versions (both full video and audio-only) of most Rural Health Education Foundation programs are freely available through the Foundation's website. New programs are sometimes presented as a live broadcast and web simulcast, enabling viewers to participate and ask questions during the program.

DVD versions of most programs are also available for purchase, and some are available for loan from selected Australian libraries.

== Target audience ==
The primary audience for Rural Health Education Foundation programs is doctors, pharmacists, nurses, administrators and other health workers operating in rural and remote Australia. For these health professionals, Foundation programs provide an opportunity to undertake continuing professional education and receive timely information emanating from national launches or events of national importance. The Foundation's educational programs reach more than 50,000 Australian health and medical professionals each year.

The secondary audience is the communities these health professionals serve – the patients and their families, carers and friends. For this stakeholder group, the Foundation's educational programs provide in-depth information about the specific condition they have, or have an interest in.

The Foundation pays particular attention to the health, medical and education needs of Aboriginal and Torres Strait Islander people.

Although the Foundation's services are primarily aimed at Australians, a substantial number of visitors to the Foundation's website come from outside Australia.

== Funding and income ==
The Rural Health Education Foundation receives funding from the Australian Government Department of Health and Ageing. It also receives funding and support from corporations, other health-focused organisations, and philanthropic trusts and individuals.

The Foundation derives income from sales of its programs in the DVD format.

== Governance ==
The Rural Health Education Foundation is a not-for-profit organisation governed by a nine-person board of directors, all of whom serve in a voluntary capacity. Day-to-day operations are managed by a chief executive officer and a team of full-time staff based in Deakin in the Australian Capital Territory, and Sydney in New South Wales.

Tom Calma was appointed Patron of the Foundation in May 2010, at a ceremony attended by the Governor General of Australia and the Federal Minister for Indigenous Health, Rural Health & Regional Services Delivery. Mr Calma is a former Aboriginal and Torres Strait Islander Social Justice Commissioner who has been involved in Indigenous affairs for 38 years.

The Foundation is an eligible tax deductible organisation (deductible gift recipient, or DGR).

== Memberships ==
The Rural Health Education Foundation is one of 29 member bodies of the National Rural Health Alliance, a national body which promotes good health and wellbeing in rural and remote Australia.

== Awards ==
Three Foundation-produced programs have been winners or finalists at the "Freddies"—the International Health and Medical Media Awards.

== Program categories ==
The Foundation has produced educational television programs in the following categories:

- Aboriginal and Torres Strait Islander Peoples Health
- Alcohol & Drug
- Behavioural Disorders
- Cardiovascular
- Clinical Skills
- Community Education
- Continence
- Critical Care / Emergency
- Dermatology
- Domestic Violence
- Ear Health
- Endocrine
- Eye Health
- Family Health
- Family Planning
- Gerontology / Aged Care
- GP Lifestyles
- Health Promotion
- Infection Control / Communicable Diseases
- Legal
- Management
- Men's Health
- Mental Health
- Musculoskeletal
- Neurology
- Nursing
- Obstetrics / Gynaecology
- Oncology
- Oral Health
- Paediatrics / Child and Adolescen
- Pharmacology
- Renal
- Respiratory
- Women's Health
- Workforce
