= Nick Pappas =

Solicitor from Sydney

Nick Pappas AM
- Born: Nicholas George Pappas; 1 March 1961 (age 65); Sydney, New South Wales, Australia
- Other names: The Godfather; Uncle Nick
- Education: Sydney Grammar School
- Alma mater: University of Sydney
- Occupations: Businessman, solicitor
- Years active: 1982–present
- Board member of: South Sydney Rabbitohs; Powerhouse Museum; SBS

Nicholas George Pappas (Greek: Νικόλαος Γεώργιος Παπαναστασιου) (born 1 March 1961) is a solicitor from Sydney, Australia, and also the chairman of the South Sydney Rabbitohs Rugby league club. He was also chairman of the club from April 2003 to June 2006. During that time Pappas had led a board borne of an uneasy compromise following a bitter campaign in the lead up to the 2003 AGM. Pappas was replaced in mid-2006 after the privatisation bid, supported by Pappas, of Russell Crowe and Peter Holmes a Court which was decided by a very narrow vote by members in March 2006. Pappas was restored to the chairman's position after the sudden departure of Holmes a Court in early 2008.

Pappas' most significant involvement with the Rabbitohs prior to being chairman was his part in the legal battle with News Limited to reinstate the club to the National Rugby League (NRL), following the Rabbitohs exclusion at the end of the 1999 season. While the Rabbitohs were successful in gaining reinstatement to the NRL, through the leadership of George Piggins and the #14 Group of supporters, the actual court case was eventually decided on appeal in the High Court of Australia in favour of News Ltd.

Pappas is also chairman of Souths Cares and the South Sydney District Rugby League Football Club Member Company, the instrument which represents the interests of the club members who hold a 25% share of ownership. In March 2026 he was appointed chairman of SBS.

Pappas is also principal, Nicholas G Pappas & Company Lawyers; Member, Archdiocesan Council of the Greek Orthodox Archdiocese of Australia; chairman, Bank of Sydney; former president and board member, Powerhouse Museum; member, Council of the Australian Archaeological Institute at Athens and board member of the Steve Waugh Foundation.

Pappas has a PhD in economic history and has written several books about the history of his parents' homeland, Castellorizo in Greece.
