= SBS Essential =

- Country: Australia
- Broadcast area: Nationally
- Network: SBS Television

Programming
- Language: English
- Picture format: 576i (SDTV)

Ownership
- Owner: Special Broadcasting Service
- Sister channels: SBS; SBS HD; SBS World News Channel

History
- Launched: 14 October 2002
- Closed: 25 January 2007

Availability

Terrestrial
- SD Digital: 31

SBS Essential was a Special Broadcasting Service television channel available to digital television viewers in Australia. It began broadcasting on 14 October 2002, and was discontinued on 25 January 2007.

SBS Essential broadcast news headlines, sports headlines, weather and program information. The channel also made use of SBS' SMS Code schedule service, where viewers could SMS a program number to SBS, and when the program was soon to air, SBS would SMS the viewer back. The channel was automated, fed via RSS news from SBS' website.

== SBS Sports + ==
SBS Sports + was a highlights loop service provided on SBS Essential during major sporting events such as the FIFA World Cup. The service allowed for digital television viewers to review specific moments, or to catch up on the progress of another game.

== Criticisms ==
The Special Broadcasting Service was often criticised for broadcasting SBS Essential by HD Digital enthusiasts. This was mainly due to the channel consuming bitrate from SBS's other Digital Television services such as SBS TV, the SBS World News Channel, and SBS HD. Due to similar reasons the channel was removed from SBS' line-up in early 2007.

== Closure ==
SBS ceased transmission of SBS Essential on 25 January 2007. The reasons for the closure include the fact that many of the services that were provided by SBS Essential, were available via the onscreen electronic program guide on SBS TV and elsewhere on the digital TV channel line-up. Also, SBS and the SBS World News Channel schedule are freely available in newspapers and on the internet.

Another major reason for the closure was that SBS Essential consumed about 10%–15% of SBS's national digital TV bandwidth, of which will now be available for other uses. It is speculated however, that subject to Government funding, SBS will introduce new digital services over the coming years.

== Identity ==
SBS Essential's on-air look was changed several times, between the channels launch and closure. The channel previously had a blue and cream colour scheme, with an abstract design.

On 22 May 2006, SBS Essential had a revamp of its on-air presentation. The design was then simple, and allowed for higher text legibility, as the channel broadcast with a low bitrate.

== See also ==
- Special Broadcasting Service
- SBS
- SBS 2
- SBS World News Channel
