= SBS World Movies =

Australian free-to-air television channel

- Logo used since 2019
- Country: Australia
- Broadcast area: Nationwide
- Network: SBS Television

Programming
- Language: Multilingual
- Picture format: 1080i HDTV (downscaled to 576i for the SDTV feed on pay TV)

Ownership
- Owner: Special Broadcasting Service
- Sister channels: SBS; SBS HD; SBS2; SBS Food; NITV

History
- Launched: October 1995; 30 years ago (pay TV); 1 July 2019; 7 years ago (free-to-air revival)
- Closed: 31 January 2018; 8 years ago (pay TV)
- Former names: World Movies (1995–2018)

Availability

Terrestrial
- Freeview SBS: Channel 32

SBS World Movies is an Australian free-to-air television channel showing international movies. The channel features foreign language films, documentaries, independent, annual films, art films and mainstream cinema and interviews with international movie stars. It was previously known simply as World Movies and was available on Foxtel. It was revived on Channel 32 as a free-to-air channel on 1 July 2019.

== History ==
=== Original channel (1995–2018) ===
The channel began broadcasting in October 1995, coinciding with the launch of Foxtel. It launched on Optus TV in May 1998. World Movies was created by its founding CEO Laurie Patton on behalf of a syndicate that included the private company of Seven Network chairman Kerry Stokes, the Australian Radio Network (ARN) and public broadcaster SBS. SBS provided access to its inventory of English language subtitles and the other shareholders funded the setup costs. In October 2009, SBS announced its intention to buy out the other shareholders, giving it full ownership of the channel.

World Movies was owned and operated by SBS Subscription TV, a subsidiary of SBS. The two have a close working relationship, with films premiering on World Movies 12 months before becoming available on the SBS free-to-air channels.

On 3 November 2014, World Movies launched a HD simulcast on Foxtel. On 31 January 2018, World Movies ceased broadcasting on Foxtel, although movies could still be seen On Demand in a section called "World Movies".

=== Revival channel (2019–present) ===
The channel was revived on free-to-air television on 1 July 2019. It is available on channel 32 in high definition, replacing the standard definition broadcast of SBS2, which will continue to be broadcast on channel 31 in HD.

A promo loop started broadcasting in some areas on 18 June 2019, and in the rest of Australia on 23 June 2019.

The channel launched on 1 July 2019 at 10am with the 2018 French film Remi Nobody's Boy.

== Programming ==
World Movies broadcasts foreign films spoken in over 200 languages and covers all genres of film, including action, adult, horror, vintage foreign film, as well as independent cinema.

The channel also broadcasts documentaries and interviews with high-profile members of the foreign film community. Past interviews have included German Director Wim Wenders, Spanish actress Paz Vega, and French star Clotilde Hesme.

=== 25 Films You Must See Before You Die ===
In 2005, World Movies and SBS ran their program 25 Films You Must See Before You Die, which showcased one film per week from 1 March to 16 August 2005.

The films chosen were:

1. Seven Samurai (1954)
2. The Rules of the Game (1939)
3. Metropolis (1927)
4. Dersu Uzala (1975)
5. Blowup (1966)
6. The Seventh Seal (1957)
7. The Battleship Potemkin (1925)
8. 8½ (1963)
9. Un Chien Andalou (1928)
10. Kes (1969)
11. Breathless (1960)
12. Mon Oncle (1958)
13. Raise the Red Lantern (1991)
14. Modern Times (1936)
15. Women on the Verge of a Nervous Breakdown (1988)
16. Boudu Saved from Drowning (1932)
17. Solaris (1972)
18. City of God (2002)
19. Breaking the Waves (1996)
20. Last Tango in Paris (1972)
21. Nosferatu, a Symphony of Terror (1922)
22. Umberto D. (1952)
23. Three Colours: Blue (1993)
24. The Battle of Algiers (1965)
25. Les Enfants du Paradis (1945)

=== 25 Docs You Must See Before You Die ===
From 3 April to 18 September 2007, the World Movies channel showed 25 Docs You Must See Before You Die.

1. Triumph of the Will (1935)
2. Grey Gardens (1975)
3. To Be and to Have (2002)
4. Dont Look Back [sic] (1967)
5. I Was a Fireman (1943)
6. In the Year of the Pig (1968)
7. The Thin Blue Line (1988)
8. The Last Waltz (1978)
9. Brother's Keeper (1992)
10. Hoop Dreams (1994)
11. The Man with a Movie Camera (1929)
12. For All Mankind (1988)
13. The Times of Harvey Milk (1984)
14. Häxan (1922)
15. Spellbound (2002)
16. The Gleaners and I (2000)
17. Murder on a Sunday Morning (2001)
18. When We Were Kings (1996)
19. Fast, Cheap & Out of Control (1997)
20. Best Boy (1979)
21. The Fog of War: Eleven Lessons from the Life of Robert S. McNamara (2003)
22. The Sorrow and the Pity (1969)
23. Silverlake Life: The View from Here (1993)
24. My Flesh and Blood (2003)
25. Hearts and Minds (1974)

== Community Involvement ==
World Movies aims to promote the importance of foreign film in Australia through partnerships and events. The channel works closely with local foreign film festivals, including the Italian Film Festival, French Film Festival and German Film Festival.

In September 2011, World Movies launched a free foreign marathon event at Palace Verona Cinema in Sydney. The event invited guests to attend a marathon of free foreign films at the cinema including the French comedy Amélie.

== See also ==
- List of digital television channels in Australia
