= Women in League =

Australian charity

The Women in League is an Australian rugby league charity which was founded in 2007 to celebrates and acknowledges the role women play at all levels and in all areas of the Rugby League.

== See also ==
- Men of League Foundation
- Souths Cares
- Women's rugby league
- Australia women's national rugby sevens team
