= Morse Point =

Morse Point (54°5′S 36°56′W) is a point marking the east side of the entrance of Antarctic Bay on the north coast of South Georgia. The point appears roughly charted on maps dating back to about 1900; it was roughly surveyed by Discovery Investigations personnel in the period 1925–31, and resurveyed by the South Georgia Survey in 1951–52. The point was named by the UK Antarctic Place-Names Committee after the British sealing vessel Morse, which was working in South Georgia in 1799–1800, probably the first British sealer to do so. She was based at Antarctic Bay when encountered by Edmund Fanning, who published an account of the meeting.
