= Guiting =

Guiting may refer to:

- Guiting Power
- Temple Guiting
- Mount Guiting-Guiting

== See also ==
- Guiding
