= Mount Woodward =

Mountain in South Georgia

Mount Woodward (54°6′S 36°54′W) is a mountain, 770 m, standing 1.5 miles (2.4 km) east of the mouth of Antarctic Bay on the north coast of South Georgia. Surveyed by the SGS in the period 1951–57, and named by the United Kingdom Antarctic Place-Names Committee (UK-APC) for Roswall Woodward, of New Haven, Connecticut, who in 1790 commanded one of the first two American sealing vessels to visit South Georgia. Nearby Antarctic Bay was at one time known as "Woodward Harbour", but this name did not survive.
