= Matthew Krel =

- Born: 1945; Krasnoyarsk, Siberia
- Died: May 20, 2009 (aged 63–64)
- Education: Gnessin State Musical College
- Occupation: conductor
- Known for: SBS Radio and Television Youth Orchestra (founder)
- Spouse: Faina Krel
- Children: 1

Matthew Krel (1945 – 20 May 2009) was a Russian-Jewish conductor who migrated to Australia and in 1988 founded the SBS Radio and Television Youth Orchestra, of which he was the chief conductor until his death. Like his Soviet friend, the composer Dmitry Kabalevsky, he was passionate about creating quality musical performance ensembles for young people. He was also profoundly influenced by Zoltán Kodály's philosophy.

== Biography ==
Matthew Krel was born in Krasnoyarsk, Siberia, to Zalman and Doba Krel, who were not musically trained. He studied in Moscow at the Gnessin State Musical College, graduating with a Master in Music in piano accordion and other keyboard instruments, and conducting. He conducted student and youth orchestras, worked at the Pushkin Drama Theatre, and toured internationally with Russian orchestras. He had a very close association with Dmitry Kabalevsky. He left the Soviet Union for Israel in the mid-1970s, and moved to Australia in 1978, settling in Sydney. His wife Faina, who had studied with him at the Gnessin College, played violin with the Sydney Symphony Orchestra. He taught music privately, worked as a pianist in the evenings, started the Strathfield Music Centre School, and was assistant conductor with the Sydney Youth Orchestra. He was also conductor of the Strathfield Symphony Orchestra from 1987 to 1994 where he instigated a short lived young performers concerto competition (1987–1988).

In 1987 he approached the Special Broadcasting Service (SBS) about creating an SBS orchestra of young people. In 1988 the management agreed, but it was up to Krel to make it work. Virtually no funds would be available to the non-profit orchestra, and neither state nor federal governments would support them financially. However SBS did provide the new organisation with free rehearsal space, storage space for instruments and use of a photocopier. The orchestra gave its first public performance at the Sydney Town Hall in 1989.

Under Krel's baton, the SBS Radio and Television Youth Orchestra performed the Australian premieres of Franz Liszt's newly discovered Piano Concerto No.3 (with pianist Roman Rudnytsky), Respighi's Belkis, Queen of Sheba, Elena Kats-Chernin's Wild Swans Suite, and other works.

He made his first return trip to his homeland in 1999, when he took the orchestra to Russia, one of their many international tours. Their playing was featured in the documentary The Russian Enigma, first broadcast on SBS in 2001. It was repeated on 7 June 2009 in tribute to Krel.

On 9 November 2008 he conducted the orchestra in only the sixth showing of the silent film The New Babylon (1929) with Dmitri Shostakovich's film score played by a live orchestra, and the first such presentation in Australia.

Matthew Krel died on 20 May 2009 of a rare form of encephalitis. He was being treated for lymphoma when he caught a virus previously unrecorded in Australia. The virus is not normally fatal, but in his case it proved to be. His funeral was held on 25 May at Temple Emanuel, Sydney, and it featured a piece for string quartet called Consolation in Memory of Matthew Krel, written for the occasion by his friend Elena Kats-Chernin. He was survived by his wife Faina, daughter Yelena and granddaughter Adrianna.

In November 2013, the Board of the SBS Youth Orchestra announced the disbanding of the orchestra, and the endowment of a position in the Fellowship Program, one of the main education programs of the Sydney Symphony Orchestra, in perpetual remembrance of Matthew Krel.
