= Antarctic Bay =

Bay in South Georgia

Coordinates: 54°6′S 36°59′W

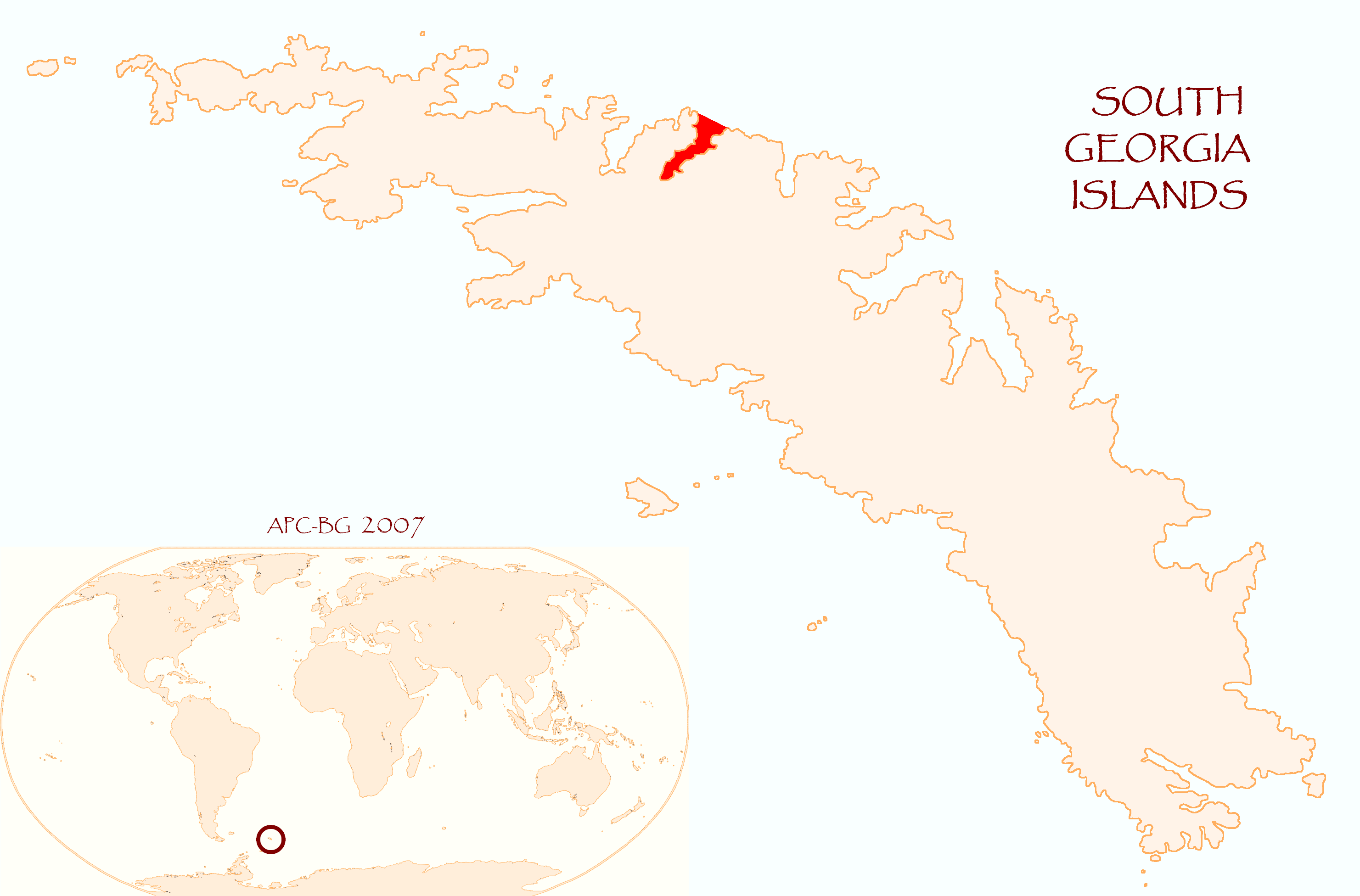
Antarctic Bay location

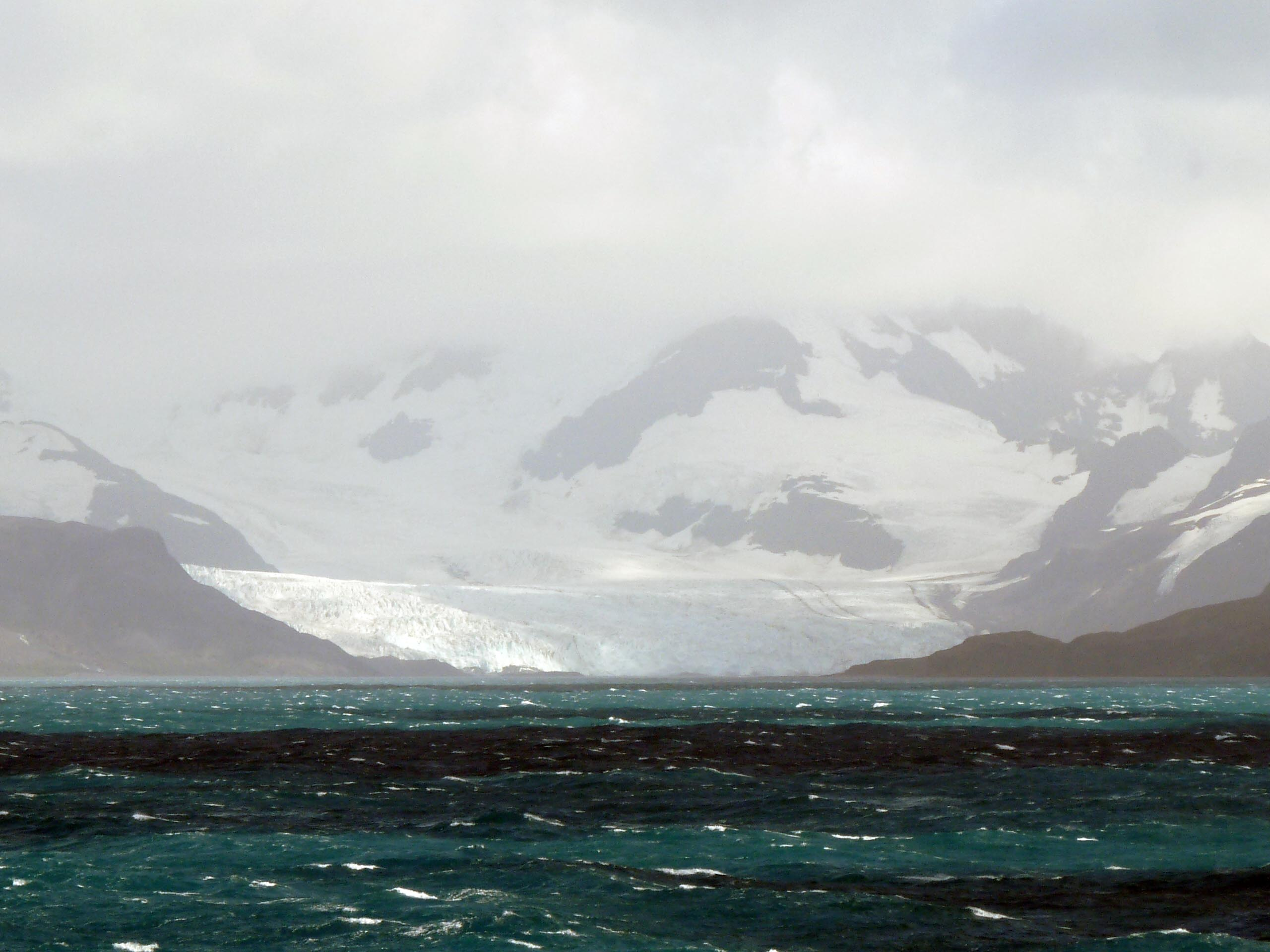
Antarctic Bay

Antarctic Bay is a bay 1 mile (1.6 km) wide which recedes southwest 4 miles (6 km), entered between Antarctic Point and Morse Point on the north coast of South Georgia. It was probably first sighted by a British expedition under James Cook in 1775, and was explored in 1902 by members of the Swedish Antarctic Expedition, under Otto Nordenskjöld, who named it for their ship, the Antarctic. An alternative (defunct) name for it was Woodward Harbour (Mount Woodward is nearby).

The Guides are two tussock-covered islands lying off the east side of the entrance to Antarctic Bay.
