= Guiding =

Guiding may refer to:

- Guide, a person who leads travelers or tourists through unknown or unfamiliar locations
- Girl Guiding and Girl Scouting, a Scouting movement
- Girlguiding, the United Kingdom's largest girl-only youth organisation
- Guiding County, a county in Guizhou Province, China

== See also ==
- Guidance (disambiguation)
- Guiting
