= Michael Ebeid =

Australian business executive

Michael Ebeid AM is an Australian business executive. He was CEO and managing director of the Special Broadcasting Service (SBS) between June 2011 and October 2018.

== Career ==
Ebeid worked with IBM for nine years in various roles across finance, sales and marketing, and worked in Tokyo and other Asian countries.

In 1995, he moved to Optus Communications, where he was Director of Commercial Operations for the Consumer Division. He was on the Board of the subscription television industry body, ASTRA, from 2001 to 2005.

In 2005, Ebeid joined Two Way Limited, an interactive TV, mobile and online entertainment media business as COO and then as CEO. Ebeid became the executive director of corporate strategy and marketing at the Australian Broadcasting Corporation (ABC) holding position until 2011 when he became CEO of SBS in 2011.

=== SBS ===
Ebeid was appointed CEO and managing director of the Special Broadcasting Service (SBS) in June 2011 and he resigned on 1 October 2018. During Ebeid's tenure, SBS expanded its digital services and multicultural programming, and launched new platforms, including SBS On Demand.

=== Telstra ===
As part of a new structure, Australian telecommunications company Telstra appointed Ebeid as Head of its Enterprise Division, on 8 October 2018. This appointment was part of the Telstra Group Executive team. Ebeid was Telstra Group Executive – Enterprise from 2018 to 2020.

== Honours and recognition ==
Ebeid was made a Member of the Order of Australia (AM) in the 2017 Queen's Birthday Honours for "significant service to the broadcast media and multicultural affairs as an executive, innovator and business leader".

Ebeid was named CEO Magazine's 'CEO of the year' at the 2017 Executive Of The Year Awards, while CEO and managing director at SBS. Ebeid was a judge for the same award in 2018.

== Personal life ==
Ebeid was born in Cairo, Egypt, and moved to Sydney, Australia, with his family when he was three.

Ebeid, who came out as gay in the 1990s, has been described as, "without doubt one of Australia's most powerful media figures".
