= Rural Health Channel =

Australian television channel

- Country: Australia
- Broadcast area: Remote Central and Eastern Australia, Regional and Remote Western Australia, and other signal deficient areas.

Programming
- Language(s): English
- Picture format: 576i (SDTV)

Ownership
- Owner: Rural Health Education Foundation

History
- Launched: 21 May 2012
- Closed: January 2014

The Rural Health Channel (RHC) was an Australian channel which showcased non-commercial health related programs. It was owned by the Rural Health Education Foundation. RHC was broadcast on the free-to-view VAST platform. It began broadcasting programs on 21 May 2012.

The Foundation was for a long time the provider of most of Westlink's programming, and also had programming on NITV.

The channel used to broadcast documentaries, forums, programs and health education information on behalf of the government. It also carried content from different groups such as men's reproductive health body. Initially the foundation was funded to deliver eight continuing medical education programs to rural health and medical professionals by producing, broadcasting and distributing television-based distance learning.

In 2014 The Rural Health Education Foundation, the not-for-profit organization was forced to close the channel saying it was no longer financially viable following a reduction in government-contracted work.

The National Health Alliance continues to make available this resources online.
