= Family of League Foundation =

Australian rugby league charity

The Family of League Foundation, formerly the Men of League Foundation, is an Australian rugby league charity founded on 11 July 2002 by retired rugby league players Max Brown, Ron Coote and Jim Hall. The purpose of the foundation is to provide funding and assistance to men, women and children from the rugby league community who have fallen on hard times.

== History ==
The concept for the foundation came about when Coote was visiting his daughter in hospital and by chance, ran into former St. George Illawarra Dragons captain Doug McRitchie, who was in the late stages of prostate cancer. Coote told author Alan Whiticker that after seeing McRitchie alone in his hospital bed, he wondered why some of his teammates weren't with him or if they even knew of his illness. Following this encounter, Coote decided to create an organisation which brought former players back to the game and created a support network for the rugby league community in Australia.

The name Men of League was given to the foundation by Narelle Hughes, wife of former Canterbury-Bankstown Bulldogs player Graeme Hughes, who had used the name for a calendar she had published for a number of years.

Following its inception, the foundation has provided help and assistance to hundreds of rugby league players around Australia.

== See also ==
- Souths Cares
- Women in League
