= Special Broadcasting Service =

Australian public radio and TV network

- Logo used since 2019

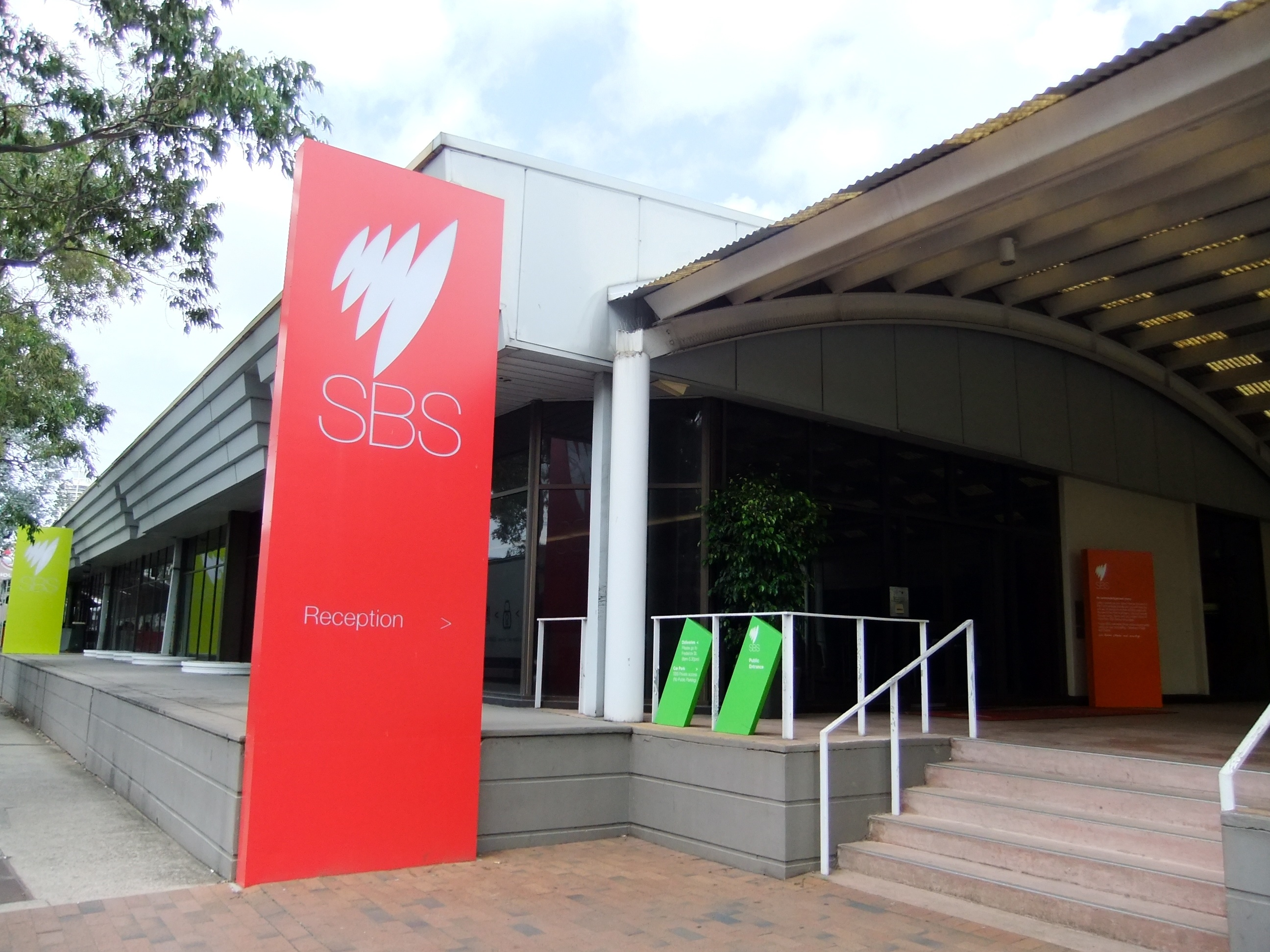
- SBS headquarters in Artarmon
- Type: Public service broadcaster
- Founded: 9 June 1975; 51 years ago
- Founder: Fraser government
- Headquarters: 14 Herbert Street, Artarmon, Sydney, Australia
- Area served: Australia
- Key people: Nicholas Pappas (Chair); Jane Palfreyman (Managing Director)
- Revenue: $159.146 million (2024)
- Operating income: $2.113 million (2024)
- Net income: $1.558 million (2024)
- Total assets: $353.253 million (2024)
- Total equity: $243.738 million (2024)
- Owner: Australian Government
- Number of employees: 1,319 (Note: Counting all ongoing and non-ongoing employees.) (2024)
- Divisions: SBS Television; SBS Radio
- Website: sbs.com.au

The Special Broadcasting Service (SBS) is Australia's multicultural and multilingual public broadcaster. It was founded in 1975 to provide radio and television programming in foreign languages for post-war migrants to Australia. Alongside the ABC, it is Australia's second public broadcaster, receiving about 70 per cent of its funding from tax revenue, and the remainder from commercials.

SBS operates six TV channels (SBS, SBS2, SBS Food, SBS World Movies and NITV) and nine radio stations (SBS Radio 1, 2, 3 and 4, SBS Chill, SBS Arabic, SBS South Asian, SBS PopEuro and SBS PopAsia). The network also operates the video streaming platform SBS On Demand.

== History ==
As a result of extensive post-World War II immigration to Australia and the end of the White Australia Policy, the federal government began to consider the need for "ethnic broadcasting" – programming targeted at ethnic minorities and mostly delivered in languages other than English. Until 1970, radio stations were prevented by law from broadcasting in foreign languages for more than 2.5 hours per week. On 9 June 1975, at the behest of Minister for Immigration Al Grassby, two "experimental" radio stations began broadcasting: 2EA in Sydney and 3EA in Melbourne (EA stood for "Ethnic Australia"), partly to publicise the Whitlam government's social policy changes to ethnic communities. In March 1976, the Fraser government established the Consultative Committee on Ethnic Broadcasting, followed by the National Ethnic Broadcasting Advisory Council in January 1977. Initially, it was considered feasible for ethnic broadcasting to be delivered by the Australian Broadcasting Commission (ABC); however, this plan was abandoned in mid-1977.

In October 1977, the government announced the creation of SBS as a new independent statutory authority for ethnic broadcasting. This was achieved as a result of an amendment to the Broadcasting Act 1942. SBS formally came into existence on 1 January 1978. The inaugural Chair of SBS was Dr Grisha A. Sklovsky, and the inaugural executive director was Ronald Fowell. The service was initially a radio network, and had oversight only of the two existing stations 2EA and 3EA. It was always intended be enlarged, but this process was controversial – the Federation of Australian Commercial Television Stations wanted the television functions controlled by the ABC.

In March 1979, the government established the Ethnic Television Review Panel, which recommended that SBS expand its multilingual services into television. SBS TV began test transmissions in April 1979 when it showed various foreign language programs on ABV-2 Melbourne and ABN-2 Sydney on Sunday mornings. Full-time transmission began on a new television channel at 6:30 pm on 24 October 1980 (United Nations Day). The first program shown was a documentary entitled Who Are We?, which was hosted by veteran news presenter Peter Luck. At the time, SBS was broadcasting on UHF Channel 28 and VHF Channel 0 (pronounced as "oh" and not "zero"), with a planned discontinuation of the latter at some time in the future. Bruce Gyngell, who introduced television to Australia in 1956, was given the task of introducing the first batch of programs on the new station.

SBS programming content was initially imported from the suppliers in the countries-of-origin of Australia's major migrant communities and then subtitled into English.

In October–November 1983, the service expanded to service the centres of Canberra, Cooma and Goulburn, subsequently changing its name to Network 0–28. Its new slogan was the eventual long-running "Bringing the World Back Home". The network changed its name to simply SBS in February 1985 and soon began daytime transmissions. SBS also expanded to the cities of Brisbane, Adelaide, Newcastle, Wollongong and the Gold Coast in June of that year.

On 5 January 1986, SBS ceased broadcasting on the VHF channel 0 frequency. Although many Australians at the time did not have UHF antennas, SBS's VHF license had already been extended by a year at this stage and not all antennas had worked well with the low-frequency Channel 0.

In August 1986, the government proposed legislation that would amalgamate SBS into the ABC. This was highly unpopular with ethnic-minority communities, and after protests from both SBS staff and communities, resulted in the Prime Minister of Australia, Bob Hawke announcing in 1987 that the proposed amalgamation would not proceed. The SBS Radio and Television Youth Orchestra was soon launched in 1988 with founding conductor Matthew Krel.

Plans to introduce limited commercial-program sponsorship, as well as the establishment of SBS as an independent corporation with its own charter, were put in place in July 1989. A program called Eat Carpet, showcasing local and international short films, was also launched in 1989. The passage into law of the Special Broadcasting Service Act 1991 officially made SBS a corporation in 1991. Throughout the early 1990s, SBS TV coverage was expanded further to include new regional areas such as the Latrobe Valley, Spencer Gulf, Darwin, northeast Tasmania, Cairns and Townsville.

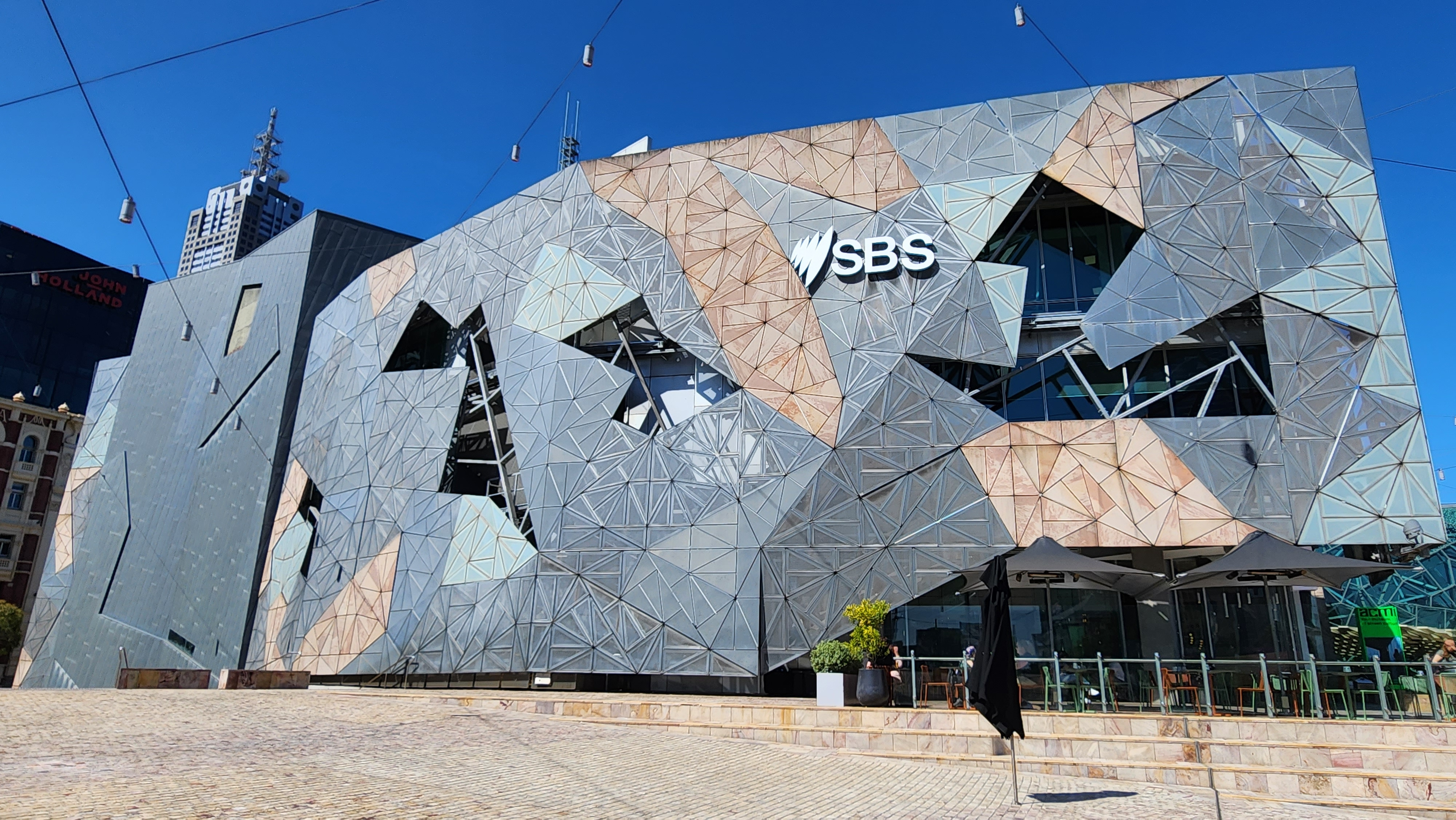
The SBS building in Melbourne's Federation Square

In 1992, SBS's radio and television facilities were gradually relocated to new premises in Artarmon, New South Wales. Radio services were initially located in Bondi Junction and television services in Milsons Point. The new building was officially opened on 10 November 1993 by the prime minister, Paul Keating, and a national radio network was launched in January 1994. The new service initially covered Brisbane, Adelaide, Perth, and Darwin, while original stations 2EA and 3EA were renamed Radio Sydney and Radio Melbourne, respectively. However, the new national service was launched on a separate frequency in Sydney and Melbourne in July of that year. Throughout 1996, the radio services were expanded to cover Hobart and Canberra, while SBS TV's coverage was further expanded to include the New South Wales North Coast and the city of Albury.

Comedy Central's South Park, SBS's most successful imported television series, was first aired in 1997. A time-delay system was installed for South Australia in May 1999, shortly before the establishment of the Transmission Services division (intended to manage transmission and self-help services). A New Media division, responsible for the SBS website, was established at the start of 2000 in time for the first webcast of the Australian Film Institute Awards. Ratings continued to increase through 2000 to 2001 – increasing to an overall 5.2% average weekly audience share.

In April 2003, SBS Radio dropped four languages from its schedule, Irish, Scots Gaelic, Welsh, and Belarusian, and added four others, Amharic, Nepalese, Malay, and Somali, while increasing the broadcast hours for Cantonese, Mandarin, and Arabic. SBS broadcast the 2004 Athens Olympics in partnership with the Seven Network, and also broadcast Euro 2008 in Austria and Switzerland.

Tagalog, Vietnamese and Arabic language broadcasts were added to SBS's WorldWatch television schedule in 2003. However, the Vietnamese community protested the Vietnamese-language service, whose content was taken from VTV4, Vietnam's government-controlled national broadcaster. They found the portrayal of the communist Vietnamese flag and Ho Chi Minh offensive and stated that the program's lack of reporting on political arrests and religious oppression was also offensive, especially to those who had fled the country following the Vietnam War. This backlash prompted SBS to remove the bulletin from schedule and from then on to display disclaimers before all externally produced bulletins in order to distance it from the content.

In May 2008, SBS unveiled a new-look logo as well as a new backronymic slogan: "Six Billion Stories and Counting".

On 8 May 2012, SBS received $158 million in government funding, of which $15 million would be used yearly, to fund the formation of a new free-to-air channel devoted to the indigenous peoples of Australia. which would replace the existing National Indigenous Television on 12 December 2012, with 90% of its staff transferring to this new channel. On 12 December 2012, NITV was re-launched as an SBS-operated free-to-air channel, replacing SBS4.

SBS is a supporter of same-sex marriage and pulled an anti-same-sex marriage advertisement ahead of its telecast of the Sydney Gay and Lesbian Mardi Gras. Then managing director, Michael Ebeid, defended SBS's position on the issue.

On 17 November 2015, the new food channel, SBS Food Network, was launched. On 17 November 2018, the channel became SBS Food.

In June 2016, SBS announced that SBS 2 was set to be rebranded as SBS Viceland with content from US-Canadian youth Vice Media from November 2016.

On 1 July 2019, SBS relaunched their former pay-TV movie channel, World Movies as SBS World Movies and it became a free-to-air channel.

On 12 January 2022, SBS announced that a sixth free-to-air television channel, with the working title SBS WorldWatch, would be launched in 2022. The channel would be free to air and would broadcast all foreign-language bulletins currently broadcast on SBS and SBS Viceland, and new locally-produced news bulletins in Arabic and Mandarin Chinese in prime time. The Arabic and Mandarin bulletins launched on 15 February 2022 through SBS On Demand, while the SBS WorldWatch channel itself was launched on 23 May.

On 24 August 2026, SBS announced that the SBS WorldWatch channel would close on 18 September 2026, with the latest non-English news bulletins only being delivered through SBS On Demand.

== Status and funding ==
Alongside the ABC, SBS is Australia's second public broadcaster. As of 2026 it receives around 70 percent of its funding from tax revenue, and the remainder from commercials. In the 2026/7 budget, it will receive A$367 million from the government. Around A$154 million will come from external revenue, mainly advertising, making a total of about A$513 million.

== Services ==
=== Television ===
Regardless of state or territory, SBS television services always use the callsign "SBS". On 14 December 2006, SBS announced its intention to change to 720p as its high-definition transmission standard for SBS HD. SBS had previously down converted its scheduled SBS high-definition content to the 576p standard. On 5 June 2012, SBS upgraded its HD format from 720p to 1080i.

LCN	Service	Notes
3	SBS	576i Standard Definition broadcast of main SBS Programs. Formerly known as SBS ONE. Original analogue channel (simulcast until last ASO)
30	SBS HD	1080i simulcast of SBS
31	SBS2	Aimed at a young demographic, formerly known as SBS Viceland. Available in 1080i High Definition only
32	SBS World Movies	Dedicated movie channel for Australian & international movies. Available in 1080i High Definition only
33	SBS Food	Food and cooking channel, formerly known as SBS Food Network. Available in 576i Standard Definition only
34	NITV HD	Broadcast of National Indigenous Television main channel in 1080i High Definition.
36	NITV	National Indigenous Television main channel in 576i Standard Definition

On 1 June 2006, the SBS managing director, Shaun Brown, announced the corporation's desire to initiate in-show commercial breaks, in the same manner as the commercial television networks. He said that the move would raise $10 million in the first year, as he believes that SBS's current strategy of showing ads between programs "is unpopular with viewers". "On average we lose more than half our audience during these breaks – this is 30 percent more than other broadcasters", claimed Brown upon announcing the new move.

SBS's commercial breaks remained at their existing statutory limit of five minutes per hour, as opposed to the fifteen minutes per hour permitted on Australia's fully commercial stations. An individual break lasted between one and two minutes. A related change was the launch of a one-hour 6:30 pm edition of World News, replacing the half-hour World News Australia and World Sport programs. In-show advertising commenced on 9 October 2006 during the 7.30 pm broadcast of MythBusters.

Former SBS television services are SBS Essential (LCN 31, sporting events, and other digital-only projects, when available), SBS World News Channel (LCN 32, foreign news service) and SBS WorldWatch (LCN 35, foreign news service).

==== Subscription channels ====
In 1995, SBS launched a new division called SBS Subscription TV. In October 1995, the first subscription channel to launch was World Movies; the channel focuses on independent international films. It was closed on 31 January 2018 but relaunched on free-to-air television on 1 July 2019. In April 2010, SBS launched Studio (previously marketed at as STVDIO); that channel focused on arts programming such as classical and popular music, literature, film, visual arts and dance with documentaries and performances. However, Studio closed down on 27 March 2015 and was replaced by Foxtel Arts.

=== Radio ===
SBS Radio broadcasts in 74 languages in all Australian states, producing an estimated 13,500 hours of Australian programming for its two frequencies in Sydney and Melbourne as well as for its national network. Much like SBS TV, SBS radio receives funding from a mix of government grants, paid-for government information campaigns and commercial advertising. SBS Radio broadcast the UEFA Euro 2008 in Austria and Switzerland.

Following "extensive community consultation" in 2003, SBS introduced a range of new programs, including services in Malay, Somali and Amharic – in addition to the expansion of many existing programs.

In April 2013, SBS rolled out a major overhaul of its radio schedule. The last major review of the SBS Radio schedule had taken place in 1994, and since then Australia's demographics had changed significantly. With the new schedule SBS intends to better reflect Australia's ethnic composition. With the addition of six new languages: Malayalam, Dinka, Hmong, Pashto, Swahili and Tigrinya, SBS has brought the total number of languages from 68 to 74.

SBS rolled out a trial of RDS (Radio Data System) in the Melbourne and Sydney broadcast areas in November 2012. Radio listeners can identify the SBS Radio service by the "SBSRadio" identifier and, if their radio permits, by RDS scrolling text on their FM-capable RDS radio.

NOW and NEXT data was progressively added to all radio services in 2012 and 2013. This now/next data is displayed on FM RDS Radio (Melbourne/Sydney) and DAB+ receptions areas for radios that can display metadata.

NOW and NEXT Radio schedule is also displayed on free-to-air Terrestrial Digital Television (DTV) program guides and on TiVo and TBox where applicable.

SBS rolled out the 14-day rolling radio schedule over DTV television in November 2012. A radio event (or program) can be viewed and booked/recorded to PVR or the listener reminded. The schedule adapts to daylight saving changes as required.

Following the Language Services Review in 2021, SBS re-introduced a range of new and existing programs in revised languages in November 2022.

	Service	Notes
Analogue with digital simulcast	SBS Radio 1	Original SBS Radio 1 broadcasts (usually on VHF band II) (Note: Different areas receive different programming, but they all for the most part follow the programming of a selected city's SBS service.)
Analogue with digital simulcast	SBS Radio 2	Original SBS Radio 2 broadcasts (usually on MF)
Digital only	SBS Radio 3	Commenced April 2013. Radio 3 broadcasts the best of the BBC World Service and SBS Special events coverage including the 2014 FIFA World Cup
Digital only	SBS Chill	SBS Chill "provides a music break from the stress of work, the rush that is daily life and all the complexities of your world".
Digital only	SBS Arabic	Arabic-language programming 24 hours a day.
Digital only	SBS PopAsia	Asian pop music in Mandarin, Cantonese, Japanese, Korean and more.
Digital only	SBS South Asian	Bollywood, Bhangra, Desi pop music, South Asian News and Talk Programming.

=== Other ===
==== On demand ====
SBS on Demand is a video on demand and catch-up TV service run by SBS. In April 2016, SBS launched a video on demand application called "SBS On Demand VR", later renamed "SBS VR".

==== SBS WorldWatch ====
A dedicated online multilingual local news bulletins in more than 30 languages as well as two local bulletins in Mandarin and Arabic. formerly on free to air channel was close on 18 September 2026.

==== Multilingual services ====
SBS has been providing multilingual services since 1975. Alongside news and radio, the SBS in-language units in both Sydney and Melbourne, provide a range of language services for medium to large organisations, private and government businesses. These include accredited translations, typesetting, voiceovers/re-narration, subtitling and video services in over 68 languages.

==== SBS independent ====
SBS independent (SBSi) was the primary production unit of SBS programming, which existed from August 1994 to December 2007. At the end of 2007, SBS independent was merged with the SBS Content and Online Division.

==== Youth orchestra ====
The SBS Youth Orchestra was an Australian premier youth orchestra, founded in 1988 by the now late Matthew Krel. It was disbanded in 2013.

==== SBS Sexuality ====
An online platform that celebrates "the diversity of sexuality in Australia and its multicultural communities".

==== Film distribution ====
SBS used to distribute films in the early 1990s. In 2014, SBS revived its film distribution division as SBS Movies, which then teamed up with SBS' home video distributor Madman Entertainment. Both SBS and Madman released the 2016 American film Hell or High Water in Oceania.

== Corporation ==
=== Board ===
Chair

- Grisha Sklovsky (1978–1981)
- Sir Nicholas Shehadie (1981–1999)
- Carla Zampatti (1999–2009)
- Joseph Skrzynski (2009–2014)
- Nihal Gupta (2014–2016)
- Bulent Hass Dellal (2017–2020)
- George Savvides (2020–2025)
- Nick Pappas (2026–present)

Managing director

- Ron Fowell (1978–1985)
- Ron Brown (1985–1987)
- Brian Johns (1987–1992)
- Malcolm Long (1992–1997)
- Nigel Milan (1997–2005)
- Shaun Brown (2005–2011)
- Michael Ebeid (2011–2018)
- James Taylor (2018–2025)
- Jane Palfreyman (2026–present)

Current board members

- Nick Pappas, Chair
- Christine Zeitz, Deputy Chair
- Jane Palfreyman, Managing Director
- Vic Alhadeff
- Aaron Fa'Aoso
- Andrew Lu
- Katrina Rathie
- Cassandra Wilkinson

== See also ==
- Digital radio in Australia
- List of programs broadcast by Special Broadcasting Service
- SBS Sport
