= Souths Cares =

The Souths Cares program is an initiative of the South Sydney Rabbitohs which was started with the aim of to give children and young people from Redfern and the surrounding areas the opportunity to take part in a series of health and education workshops to aid social and physical development and creating a network of committed individuals working together to bring about social change. It is based in Sydney, New South Wales, Australia.

== Directors ==
Current directors are:

- Nicholas Pappas – current chairman of South Sydney Rabbitohs Football Club and Member Company
- Shane Richardson – current CEO of South Sydney Rabbitohs
- James Patterson – chief executive, Australia & New Zealand Cushman & Wakefield
- Kristina Keneally – former premier of New South Wales
- Harley Broderick – financial representative

== Financial record ==
The last four years have produced the following revenue and delivery to charitable programs:

| Year | 2010 | 2011 | 2012 | 2013 |
| Total Revenue | $793,204 | $665,988 | $891,296 | $895,077 |
| Amount to Programs | $155,706 | $188,816 | $131,888 | $95,213 |
| Percentage of Revenue to Programs | 19.6% | 28.35% | 14.8% | 10.6% |

== See also ==
- Men of League Foundation
