= SBS2 =

Australian free-to-air television channel

- Logo used since 2026
- Country: Australia
- Broadcast area: Nationwide
- Network: SBS Television

Programming
- Language: English
- Picture format: 1080i HDTV (downscaled to 16:9 576i for the SDTV feed on pay TV)

Ownership
- Owner: Special Broadcasting Service
- Sister channels: SBS; SBS HD; SBS World Movies; SBS Food; NITV

History
- Launched: 1 June 2009; 17 years ago
- Replaced: SBS World News Channel
- Former names: SBS TWO (2009–2013); SBS Viceland (2016–2026)

Availability

Terrestrial
- Freeview SBS: Channel 31

SBS2 is an Australian free-to-air television channel owned and operated by the Special Broadcasting Service (SBS).

The channel first launched as SBS TWO on 1 June 2009, and was later branded as SBS 2 between 2013 and 2016. Through a partnership with Vice Media, the channel was branded as SBS VICELAND between 2016 and 2026.

On 8 April 2017, the channel began simulcasting in high definition. On 17 June 2019, the standard definition broadcast was closed and replaced by SBS World Movies, leaving the channel to broadcast in HD only. The channel also supports audio description. When a film with audio description is played, a short sound plays and the audio description logo appears at the top.

== History ==
=== As SBS TWO ===
From 2006–2009 SBS 2 was a Standard Definition channel on channel 31 which broadcast the same content as the SBS main channel. Extra information would be broadcast on this channel, for example sports highlights. The SBS 2 channel was available in all areas where SBS is currently broadcasting digital transmissions.

In a statement made by SBS in early 2009 plans for the channel SBS World were announced, to replace SBS World News Channel on channel 32. On 26 April 2009, Freeview's website and advertisements showed that the channel would be called SBS TWO.

On 12 May 2009, SBS revealed programming details for the SBS TWO launch. This included a 5-minute feature at 6 pm called SBS TWO Launch: What is SBS TWO?, followed by the Academy Award winning short film Harvie Krumpet. On 1 June 2009, the SBS World News Channel stopped broadcasting and went into a loop of advertising for SBS TWO before the official launch later that day. SBS had originally planned for the channel to focus on Asia-Pacific speciality shows, international children's programming and English learning programmes.

On 20 February 2013, SBS announced major changes to the programming on SBS TWO, with a relaunch as a bold, provocative channel for younger audiences aged 16–39 from 1 April 2013, known as SBS 2.

=== SBS Viceland ===
In June 2016, Shane Smith, CEO of US-Canadian media company Vice, announced at the Cannes Lions Festival that the company had reached deals with international broadcasters to launch localised versions of Viceland—a television brand featuring lifestyle-oriented reality and documentary-style programming aimed towards young adults. Among the partners announced was SBS.

On 4 October 2016, SBS and Vice officially announced that SBS 2 would change its name to SBS Viceland on 15 November 2016. Michael Slonim, marketing director of Vice Australia, stated that SBS shared Vice's "storytelling sensibilities and curiosity about the world", and felt that the launch would "help catapult Vice further into the consciousness of young Australians". Subsequently the channel has remained with SBS, but with some original programmes produced for the American Viceland channel. While using the same branding, SBS Viceland had no corporate association with its international affiliates.

On 17 June 2019, SBS Viceland became an HD only service on Channel 31. Channel 32 became SBS World Movies on 1 July 2019, also only in HD. An SD version of SBS 2 (alongside SBS and SBS World Movies) continues to broadcast via Foxtel on the AEST schedule. SBS Radio 1, Radio 2, Radio 3 and Arabic and South Asian stations are still airing the SBS VICELAND advertisement with electronic music, which is now rarely heard on SBS Arabic and South Asian.

=== Return to SBS2 ===
On 18 May 2026, it was revealed that SBS Viceland would change its name to SBS2 effective 21 August, reverting the channel back to its previous name after nearly a decade. While the American channel (now known as Vice TV) remained on the air at the time of the rebrand, SBS Viceland had outlived all other Vice-branded television outlets around the world. The rebrand was officially announced by SBS on 25 June 2026.

== Programming ==
=== General ===
SBS 2 screens mainly light entertainment and documentaries in peak viewing time. Much of its daytime programming is international English-language news programming. It previously also aired drama series and international films each night under themed programming blocks.

The channel's April 2013 relaunch as SBS 2 included various TV shows for a younger audience, including Bullet in the Face, Don't Tell My Mother, The Tales of Nights, Russell Howard's Good News, South Park, The Midnight Beast, Skins, Him & Her, Threesome, If You Are the One (a Chinese version of the Australian game show Taken Out), Housos, The Office, Parks and Recreation, Adam Ruins Everything and Community.

Its flagship news and current affairs program The Feed aired on weeknights at 7:30pm. The Feed later moved to the main SBS channel in 2020.

Most of the non-English WorldWatch news bulletins had relocated to a new channel called SBS WorldWatch on 23 May 2022, leaving only the English news bulletins from international news channels.

=== Sport ===
From its formation in 2009, SBS Viceland's predecessor SBS 2 featured all stages of the Tour de France with full broadcasting rights in conjunction with SBS One, as well as exclusive UEFA Champions League matches as of the 2009–10 season. In 2010, SBS 2 aired repeat matches from the 2010 FIFA World Cup in South Africa with full broadcasting rights in conjunction with SBS One. In 2013, SBS 2 began broadcasting a weekly live A-League Friday-night match and A-League Finals matches. SBS 2 aired some matches from the 2014 FIFA World Cup, in conjunction with SBS.

In 2013 and 2014, SBS 2 was the Freeview broadcaster of the ANZ Championship's live Sunday afternoon match. It gave netball fans across the nation the chance to keep viewing the sport on free to air TV after Network Ten dumped it stating it was "insignificant" for mainstream media and "not a premium sport", which led to no broadcast partner for the 2013 season until the very last minute which saw SBS struck a deal to broadcast the 2013 & 2014 seasons in conjunction with Fox Sports Australia. SBS also had the rights to the ANZ Championship finals & International test matches on its free-to-air television network between 2013–2014.

SBS 2 broadcasts some sport. For example, an Illawarra Hawks v Perth Wildcats game in June 2021 received viewing figures of 40,000. SBS 2 also broadcast the NBA for a time.

SBS 2 aired some group matches from the 2018, 2022 & 2026 FIFA World Cup, in conjunction with SBS.

SBS 2 broadcasts selected Thursday night 6 matches from Australian Championship in 2026.

== Availability ==
SBS 2 is available nationwide. SBS 2 is an HD only channel on Channel 31. The service is broadcast in 1080i HD in an MPEG-4 format. SBS 2 SD continues to broadcast via Foxtel.

=== Viewership ===
By 2017 SBS Viceland's ratings were down by 26% in the 16–34 demographic in comparison to its previous incarnation as SBS 2. An SBS representative defended the service, noting that its target audience was engaging with the network through its digital and on-demand platforms.

== Logo and identity history ==
The first logo for SBS 2 was inspired by the then-current logo for SBS with the "Mercator" symbol paired with the text "SBS TWO". When SBS was renamed "SBS ONE" that same year, its new logo was based on the SBS 2 logo. After SBS 2 was rebranded on 1 April 2013, the channel received a new contemporary logo with "SBS" written next to an orange painted number 2. This logo was updated on 30 October 2015 with a bolder font for "SBS" and included the top half of the "Mercator" symbol attached to the top curve of the number 2. The logo once changed again after the launch of SBS Viceland on 15 November 2016. Although most international versions of Viceland have rebranded to Vice on TV, SBS Viceland retained its name due to it being fully controlled by SBS. When the station was still called VICELAND in 2016–2026, some station IDs featured a small slash pointing to an object with text. This slash would then point to different objects, accompanied by a ding sound. If the text is displayed in a way that makes it look more like a line, various objects are shown. The SBS VICELAND logo then appears. When the station launched in 2016 under the name SBS Viceland, it used several different station IDs. Some of these included sound effects. For example, you might hear the sound of a printer and hear it repeatedly state that it was a television station. Then the date November 15th would appear, followed by a prompt to call a specific number. Next, motion images of a person speaking would be shown, and the date November 15th would continue to be displayed. The prompt to call 1800-321-511 was also always displayed.

1 June 2009 –
1 April 2013

1 April 2013 –
30 October 2015

30 October 2015 –
15 November 2016

15 November 2016 – 21 August 2026

21 August 2026 –
present

=== Identity history ===
- 1 June 2009 – 27 October 2011: "Six Billion Stories and Counting"
- 28 October 2011 – 1 April 2013: "Seven Billion Stories and Counting"
- 1 April 2013 – 15 November 2016: "BOLD. PROVOCATIVE."
- 15 November 2016 – 21 August 2026: "It's a TV Channel."
- 21 August 2026 – present: "Entertainment with real bite"

== See also ==
- List of digital television channels in Australia
