= Guidance Solutions =

Guidance Solutions, Inc.
- Type: Private
- Industry: IT and Internet services
- Founded: California, USA (1993)
- Headquarters: 4134 Del Rey Ave., Marina del Rey, CA, USA
- Key people: Jason Meugniot (Owner and CEO); Jon Provisor (Owner and CIO); Lisa Brewer (COO); Jon Larsen (VP, Information Systems and Managed Services)
- Services: E-commerce development, mobile applications
- Website: guidance.com

Guidance Solutions, Inc. is a website development company that builds e-commerce websites, and mobile applications for retailers such as Burlington Coat Factory and Foot Locker. The company was founded in Hawthorne, California in 1993 by Joe Tang, Pillan Thirumalaisamy, and Vijay Kotrappa.

== History ==
Between 2007 and 2008, the company implemented a program intended to achieve carbon neutrality. In February 2008, employees Jason Meugniot and Jon Provisor purchased the company from its founders.
