= Corps of Mounted Guides (Portugal) =

- Corpo de Guias Montados
- Active: 1808 - 1814
- Disbanded: 1814
- Country: Portugal
- Allegiance: Portugal; United Kingdom
- Branch: Anglo-Portuguese Army
- Type: Military Intelligence Cavalry
- Role: To act as guides and orderlies to the British generals and their staff
- Size: 12 officers and 193 troopers
- Nickname: Corps of Guides

Commanders
- Commander: George Scovell

The Corps of Mounted Guides was raised in Portugal on 26 September 1808 to act as guides and orderlies to the British generals and their staff.

== First year ==
Initially the Corps only had a sergeant, a corporal and 18 troopers. It was commanded from 1808 to 1814 by Major (later LtCol) George Scovell, seconded from the Portuguese Quartermaster-General's Department. Wellington later mentioned that when he took command of the army in April 1809 he formed a Corps of Horsemen then he denominated the Corps of Mounted Guides which was placed under the command of an officer of the British Quartermaster-General's Department.

== Transformation into an intelligence corps ==
Wellington rapidly expanded and transformed the Corps into a real military intelligence corps at the service of the leaders of the Anglo-Portuguese Army in the field, and it was indeed attached to the British Quartermaster-General's Department. Some 15 officers (including 12 Portuguese) were appointed to the corps between 25 April and 3 June 1809; many more enlisted men were also added and, in 1813, the corps had 12 officers and 193 men. In 1808-1810 the corps was largely Portuguese, its officers being generally students of the University of Coimbra. All were to speak both English and Portuguese. Later recruits were generally of foreign deserters and Spaniards in order to gather information for the Anglo-Portuguese Army in Spain and southern France.

== In action ==
The corps also took advantage of the semaphores. In the 1812-1814 campaigns the Corps of Mounted Guides was increasingly tasked with transmission of despatches, and also became more involved in provost duties. This corps is somewhat hard to classify as it was not listed on the official establishment of either the Portuguese Army or the official establishment of the British Army. As it was initially raised in Portugal with Portuguese personnel. It disbanded in the middle of 1814, probably because of the end of the Peninsular War and the end of the Anglo-Portuguese Army

== Uniform ==
The clothing issued in 1808 was obviously in the style of the light dragoons. Its "complete suits" included helmets, a pelisse like the hussars', and boots. Stable dress included a red stable shirt, trousers, shoes with laces. The guides were described in 1813 Francis Larpent as dressed "in scarlet jackets looking more regular than most Spanish regulars and not unlike our own volunteer yeomanry cavalry with an air of consequence". This certainly indicates that the style was indeed that of the light dragoons before 1812–1813, featuring the tarleton helmet and the jacket trimmed with cords. It would also seem to indicate that the guides wore the colours of the British Quartermaster-General's Department: scarlet faced with blue, with white or silver buttons and lace.
