= Ten Guide =

Former Australian television channel

- Country: Australia
- Broadcast area: Sydney, Melbourne, Brisbane, Adelaide, Perth
- Network: Network Ten

Programming
- Language: English
- Picture format: 576i (SDTV) 16:9

Ownership
- Owner: Ten Network Holdings
- Sister channels: Ten

History
- Launched: 1 July 2004
- Closed: 20 November 2007
- Replaced by: Ten SD2

Availability

Terrestrial
- SD Digital: Channel 11/100

The Ten Guide was a television channel provided by Network Ten to digital television viewers in Australia. It began broadcasting on 1 July 2004 network-wide simultaneously on Network Ten in Sydney, Melbourne, Brisbane, Adelaide, and Perth and was broadcast 24 hours per day. The channel ceased broadcasting on 20 November 2007.

== Features ==
The Ten Guide featured a twenty-four-hour television guide for programming on Channel Ten. The channel also provided an updated television schedule for Channel Ten's programming, including information for the availability of native high-definition and ratings classification. Realtime weather information was also available for select Australian cities.

=== Live preview ===
A live video preview of Channel Ten was available on the Ten Guide. The live video preview was in a small, widescreen format.

=== Advertising ===
The Ten Guide advertised new and high rating television programs from Channel Ten via a large billboard loop. The advertising contained minimal broadcast information, however contained images of celebrities featured on Channel Ten.

== Identity ==
The Ten Guides' onair look changed several times since July 2004 when the channel launched. The initial onair identity of the Ten Guide featured a small 16:9 ratio preview of Network Ten. The design and colour scheme was based on Network Ten's on-air branding in 2004, with the use of light blue, light grey, and white.

The most recent onair identity of the Ten Guide, prior to the channel's closure, launched on 1 June 2007. The guide featured a larger 16:9 ratio preview of Network Ten's main service. The design and colour scheme was based on Network Ten's on-air branding which launched in early 2007.

== Demise ==
The Ten Guide was closed down on 20 November 2007, due to the channel needing to be removed to free up more room on the spectrum to enable the increase of the bit rate to the Network Ten and Ten HD channels, as well as providing an increased digital programming guide, which can be read on some digital televisions and set top boxes.

== See also ==
- Seven Guide
- Nine Guide
- SBS Essential
