= The Guides =

Islands of South Georgia

The Guides (54°4′S 36°52′W) are two tussock-covered islands lying off the east side of the entrance to Antarctic Bay along the north coast of South Georgia. Charted by the German Antarctic Expedition under Filchner, 1911–12. The name appears on a chart based upon surveys of South Georgia by DI personnel in the period 1926–30.
