= American Indian Scouting Association =

- Owner: Boy Scouts of America; Girl Scouts of the USA
- Country: United States
- Founded: 1956
- Website web.archive.org/web/20210822033556/https://www.scoutingaisa.org/

The American Indian Scouting Association (AISA) is a joint venture of the Boy Scouts of America (BSA) and the Girl Scouts of the USA (GSUSA). The AISA began as a committee of concerned Boy Scout Scoutmasters in 1956 and was sponsored by the Bureau of Indian Affairs in Los Alamos, New Mexico.

== Background ==
AISA holds an annual seminar, which began in 1957, is run by a volunteer steering committee and is hosted by a local tribe or Indian community. The seminar was developed in order to attract both Indians and non-Indians and foster understanding of Indian culture and Scouting. Youth participation in this seminar began in 1975.
