= USC&GS Guide (1929) =

American survey ship

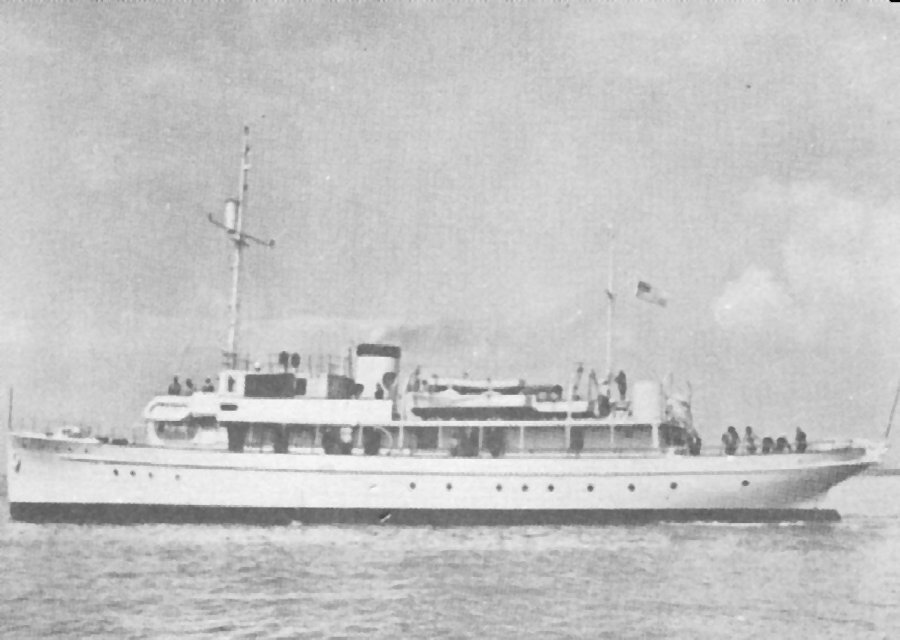
- The former USC&GS Guide as the U.S. Navy patrol vessel USS Andradite (PYc-11) sometime between 1942 and 1945.

History

United States
- Name: Guide
- Namesake: Guide, a person who leads anyone through unknown or unmapped country
- Builder: Defoe Boat and Motor Works, Bay City, Michigan
- Completed: 1929
- Acquired: 1941
- Fate: Transferred to U.S. Navy 16 March 1942
- Notes: Served as civilian yacht Cameco or Comoco and Caronia or Coronia 1929-1941; Served as U.S. Navy patrol vessel USS Andradite (PYc-11) 1942-1945; In commercial service 1952-1956; Destroyed by fire 1956

General characteristics
- Type: Survey ship
- Displacement: 225 to 395 tons
- Length: 140.2 ft (42.7 m)
- Beam: 23.6 ft (7.2 m)
- Draft: 9.4 ft (2.9 m)
- Installed power: 1,200 shaft horsepower (1.6 megawatts)
- Propulsion: Two 600-horsepower (0.8-megawatt) Cooper Bessemer 8-G X-6M R diesel engines; two shafts
- Speed: 11.7 knots

The second USC&GS Guide was a survey ship that served in the United States Coast and Geodetic Survey from 1941 to 1942.

Guide was built as the civilian yacht Cameco or Comoco by the Defoe Boat and Motor Works at Bay City, Michigan, in 1929. She later was renamed Caronia or Coronia. The United States Navy acquired her in 1941 and transferred her to the Coast and Geodetic Survey, which named her USC&GS Guide.

After conversion for service as a survey ship, Guide entered Coast and Geodetic Survey service in 1941. She did a small amount of hydrographic surveying work in San Francisco Bay, California, before her Coast and Geodetic Survey career was cut short when she was transferred to the U.S. Navy on 16 March 1942 for World War II service under Executive Order 9072 of 24 February 1942.

In the Navy, the ship served as the armed yacht USS Andradite (PYc-11), until 1945. Sources differ on whether she returned to Coast and Geodetic Survey service in 1947, but she was sold into commercial service in 1952 and operated until destroyed by fire in the Pacific Ocean in 1956.
