= Nine Guide =

- Country: Australia
- Broadcast area: Sydney, Melbourne, Brisbane
- Network: Nine Network

Programming
- Language: English
- Picture format: 576i (SDTV) 16:9

Ownership
- Owner: PBL Media
- Sister channels: Nine; 9HD

History
- Launched: 21 August 2001
- Closed: 13 November 2008; 17 years ago
- Replaced by: GO! (now 9Go!)

Availability

Terrestrial
- SD Digital: Channel 99

The Nine Guide was a television datacast channel provided by the Nine Network to digital television viewers in Australia. It began broadcasting on 21 August 2001, in Sydney broadcasting 24 hours a day. The channel expanded to fellow Nine Network stations in Melbourne and Brisbane in 2002. The Guide was modified for state-based programming and program promotions.

The Nine Guide was shut down on Thursday, 13 November 2008, replaced by a full-screen simulcast of Channel Nine in preparation for the launch of multichannel GO!.

== Features ==
The Nine Guide featured a television guide for programming on Channel Nine for the following twelve hours, including information on the availability of native high-definition, ratings classification and availability of closed captions. Realtime weather information was also available for select Australian and New Zealand cities as well as realtime date and time information.

=== Live Preview ===
A live 16:9 video preview of Channel Nine was available on the top left of the screen. The live video preview was also accompanied by 'Now on' and 'Coming Up' program information to the left of the live video preview.

=== Advertising ===
The Nine Guide advertised new and prime time television programs from Channel Nine via a small billboard loop on the bottom left. The advertising contained program information including the program title and Channel Nine broadcast time. The times were modified for local markets where the times differed from the network schedule.

== Identity ==
The Nine Guide's onair look has been changed several times since its launch in August 2001. The channel initially had a blue colour scheme with white text, and a smaller 16:9 preview of Channel Nine.

A few years later, the Nine Guide had a revamp of its on-air presentation. The design had a daily colour scheme, alternating every twenty-four hours. The channel featured a similar sized 16:9 ratio preview of Channel Nine, and a National Nine News and weather slide at the top. On 30 January 2006 coinciding with the relaunch of Channel Nine's new logo and revamp on its on-air identity, the guide revamped with a new look and a larger 16:9 ratio preview of Channel Nine.

The Nine Guide then relaunched with a revamp again on 21 January 2007 coinciding with the revamp of Channel Nine's branding of its on-air identity. The guide now featured a similar sized 16:9 ratio preview of Channel Nine.

The previous on-air identity of the Nine Guide launched on 1 December 2007 along with the new slogan: we♥tv. The guide featured a similar sized 16:9 ratio preview of Channel Nine.

== See also ==
- Seven Guide
- Ten Guide
