= Seven Guide =

- Country: Australia
- Broadcast area: Sydney, Melbourne, Brisbane, Adelaide, Perth
- Network: Seven Network

Programming
- Language: English
- Picture format: 576i (SDTV) 16:9

Ownership
- Owner: Seven Media Group
- Sister channels: Seven; 7HD

History
- Launched: 6 September 2002
- Closed: 4 July 2008

Availability

Terrestrial
- SD Digital: 77

The Seven Guide was a datacast channel provided by the Seven Network to digital television viewers in Australia. It began broadcasting on 6 September 2002. The channel was broadcast 24 hours a day. The channel was available to viewers on channel 77 in Sydney, Melbourne, Brisbane, Adelaide and Perth. The guide was also modified for state-based news and program promotions. The guide initially launched in Sydney and Melbourne, with Brisbane, Adelaide and Perth launching the guide later in 2003. The channel ceased broadcasting on 4 July 2008.

== Features ==
The Seven Guide featured a twenty-four-hour television guide for the programming of Channel Seven. The channel also provided realtime news twenty-four hours a day, which included breaking news reports and local news reports from state-based news rooms. Also, realtime weather reports for Australia, occasionally localised for state-based markets including wild weather alerts and traffic reports.

=== Live Preview ===
A live video preview of Seven was available on the Seven Guide. The live video preview was also accompanied by a Now On and Coming Up television guide.

=== Advertising ===
The Seven Guide advertised new and high rating television programs from Seven via a small billboard loop. The advertising contained program information and broadcast times, that were modified for different time zones and state-based programming. Following the introduction of Seven HD, the small billboard loop contained what's on during the week.

== Identity ==
The Seven Guides' onair look changed several times since September 2002 when the channel launched. The channel initially had a Red and White theme, with a modern design. The channel featured a smaller 4:3 ratio preview of Seven, and a Seven news ticker at the bottom.

In January 2005, the Seven Guide had a revamp of its on-air presentation. The design became simpler, and allowed for a higher concentration of text. The channel featured a larger 4:3 ratio preview of Seven, and a Seven News and weather ticker at the bottom.

The new onair identity of the Seven Guide launched on 12 June 2008. However this identity was dropped for the previous identity on the right on 15 June 2008 for the closure of Seven Guide on 4 July.

== See also ==
- Nine Guide
- Ten Guide
