= SBS World News Channel =

Australian television news channel

- Country: Australia
- Broadcast area: Nationally
- Network: SBS Television

Programming
- Languages: English; Various
- Picture format: 576i (SDTV) 16:9

Ownership
- Owner: Special Broadcasting Service

History
- Launched: 12 June 2002; 24 years ago
- Closed: 1 June 2009; 17 years ago
- Replaced by: SBS2

Availability At time of closure

Terrestrial
- Freeview: Channel 32

The SBS World News Channel was an Australian television channel broadcast by SBS Television that launched on 12 June 2002. The channel, which used to be available only to digital television viewers in Australia, was the first digital-only multi-channel for the Special Broadcasting Service. The news service was broadcast for eighteen hours per day, seven days a week, retransmitting news from fifteen countries. In between news retransmissions, the channel displayed weather information, news headlines, and some commercial advertising.

== History ==
The SBS World News Channel was officially inaugurated by Minister for Communications, Information Technology and the Arts, Senator Richard Alston on 12 June 2002, with the launch broadcast simultaneously live onto the channel.

It was previously known as The World News in its first year.

Tagalog, Vietnamese, and Arabic language broadcasts were added to SBS' WorldWatch schedule in 2003. The Vietnamese service, taken from the government-controlled channel VTV4, was heavily protested against by the Vietnamese community, many of whom found the bulletin's portrayal of the communist Vietnamese flag and Ho Chi Minh offensive. The Vietnamese Community of Australia, claimed that the program's lack of reports on political arrests and religious oppression were also offensive, especially to those who fled the country following the Vietnam War

The backlash resulting from these events prompted SBS to begin showing disclaimers before all externally produced bulletins, distancing the broadcaster from each bulletin's editorial content.

Genre restrictions imposed by the Australian government on digital multi-channelling were lifted along with the media ownership laws passed through the Australian parliament on 18 October 2006.

Between broadcasts, a commercial for the channel was shown. The dialogue is as follows:

The SBS World News Channel delivers more than 200 news programs from around the globe each week, providing an up to date and varied perspective on the headlines of the day. Each bulletin is in the language and format of the country of origin. From 5:20am Monday to Saturday, continuous telecasts from international broadcasters via satellite from some of the most respected news bureaus of the world, From 7:00am Sundays, news reviews and magazine style information programs. The most comprehensive international news channel in the world, with unparalleled access to continuing news and current affairs from 17 countries in languages other than English. Available only on the SBS World News Channel.

The channel was set up as an experimental full service channel.

SBS World News Channel was broadcast on channel 33 from its launch until 29 January 2009, when it was moved to channel 32. Thereafter, a simulcast of SBS was shown on channel 33. SBS World News Channel was closed and replaced by SBS2 on 1 June 2009.

== Programming ==
The SBS World News Channel broadcast for 18 hours each day, retransmitting over two-hundred news programs per week, from twenty-three countries. The channel's programming line-up consisted of retransmissions of bulletins from news services throughout the world, including:

Language	Country of origin	Broadcaster
Arabic	United Arab Emirates	Dubai TV
Cantonese	Hong Kong	ATV (2002–2007), TVB (2007–2009)
Croatian	Croatia	HRT
Dutch	Netherlands	NPO/NOS (via BVN)
Filipino	Philippines	ABS-CBN
French	France	France 2
German	Germany	DW-TV
Greek	Greece	ERT
Hungarian	Hungary	Duna TV
Indonesian	Indonesia	TVRI
Italian	Italy	RAI
Japanese	Japan	NHK
Korean	South Korea	YTN
Macedonian	Macedonia	MRT
Maltese	Malta	PBS
Mandarin	China	China Central Television
Polish	Poland	Polsat
Serbian	Serbia	RTS
Spanish	Spain	RTVE
Spanish	Chile	TVN
Russian	Russia	NTV Russia
Turkish	Turkey	TRT
Vietnamese	Vietnam	VTV (VTV4)

These programs are also presented on SBS TV, along with PBS's Nightly Business Report and PBS NewsHour, SBS TV broadcasts World News Australia, and the English version of Deutsche Welle's bulletin.

=== earthTV ===
earthTV was broadcast on the SBS World News Channel when news programs are broadcast. It also acted as a filler when news programs are delayed.

== See also ==
- SBS WorldWatch, a similar channel which began in 2022
