= 10 (Southern Cross Austereo) =

Australian television network

- Country: Australia
- Broadcast area: Regional QLD, Southern NSW & ACT, Regional VIC, Broken Hill and Spencer Gulf
- Affiliates: Network 10

Programming
- Language: English
- Picture format: 576i (SDTV) 16:9; 1080i (HDTV) 16:9

Ownership
- Owner: Southern Cross Austereo
- Sister channels: 10 HD; 10 Drama; 10 Comedy; Nickelodeon; SBN; News24 Regional; gecko

History
- Launched: 9 December 1961; 64 years ago
- Closed: 1 March 2025
- Replaced by: Network 10
- Former names: Television Centre of Victoria (TCV) (GLV/BCV) (1970s–1982); North Queensland Television (NQTV) (TNQ) (1978–1990); Capital 7 – Australian Capital Television (CTC) (1981–1988); Southern Cross TV8 (GLV/BCV) (1982–1989); QTV (TNQ) (1990–1994); Southern Cross Network (GLV/BCV) (1989–1992); Capital Television (CTC) (1988–1989, 1991–1994); SCN (GLV/BCV) (1992–1994); Ten Capital (CTC) (1989–1991, 1994–2002); Ten Victoria (GLV/BCV) (1994–2002); Ten Queensland (TNQ) (1994–2002); Southern Cross Ten (2002–2016); Nine (2016–2021)

Links
- Website: www.sca.com.au

Availability

Terrestrial
- Freeview SC10 owned (virtual): 5/51
- Freeview SC10 HD (virtual): 50

10 was an Australian television network distributed by Southern Cross Austereo (SCA) in regional Queensland, southern New South Wales, the Australian Capital Territory, regional Victoria, the Spencer Gulf and Broken Hill. SCA's network was the primary affiliate of Network 10 in these regional areas.

On 17 December 2024, Southern Cross Austereo announced the sale of their regional television licenses in Regional Queensland, Southern NSW/ACT and Regional Victoria to Network 10. The sale was completed on 1 March 2025.

== History ==
=== Origins ===
Southern Cross began as a small network of three stations in regional Victoria. The Southern Cross TV8 network comprised GLV-10 Gippsland, BCV-8 Bendigo, and STV-8 Mildura.

GLV was the first regional television station in the country, launched on 9 December 1961. BCV-8 launched in the same year, on 23 December, while STV followed four years later, on 27 November 1965. GLV-10 became GLV-8 in 1980, when Melbourne commercial station ATV-0 moved frequencies to become ATV-10 The network began life in 1982 as Southern Cross TV8, but later changed its name in 1989 to the Southern Cross Network. Soon after this, STV-8 left the network after it was bought by businessman Alan Bond, and eventually sold on to ENT Limited (owners of Vic TV and Tas TV).

=== 1992–2016: 10 affiliation ===
Regional Victoria was aggregated in 1992. VIC Television, based in Shepparton and Ballarat affiliated with the Nine Network, while Prime Television, based in Albury-Wodonga became an affiliate of the Seven Network. Southern Cross, therefore, took on an affiliation with Network Ten. Soon after, it changed its name and logo to SCN, directly emulating the look of its metropolitan counterpart. Local news was axed six months later, while the name and logo changed once again to Ten Victoria along with new names Ten Capital, Ten Northern NSW & Ten Queensland as they carried and introduced the Network Ten logo into their brand.

Canberra-based station Capital Television was purchased by Southern Cross' owner, Southern Cross Broadcasting, in 1994. It was soon integrated into the network, taking on the name Ten Capital soon after.

Southern Cross Broadcasting acquired Telecasters Australia in 2001. As a result, Ten Queensland and Ten Northern NSW became a part of the Southern Cross Ten network, while Telecasters' other assets – Seven Darwin and Seven Central – were later integrated into the Southern Cross network. Local news bulletins in Canberra and parts of Queensland were axed on 22 November 2001 – one of a number of moves taken by Southern Cross and competitor Prime Television that resulted in an investigation by the Australian Broadcasting Authority into the adequacy of regional news.

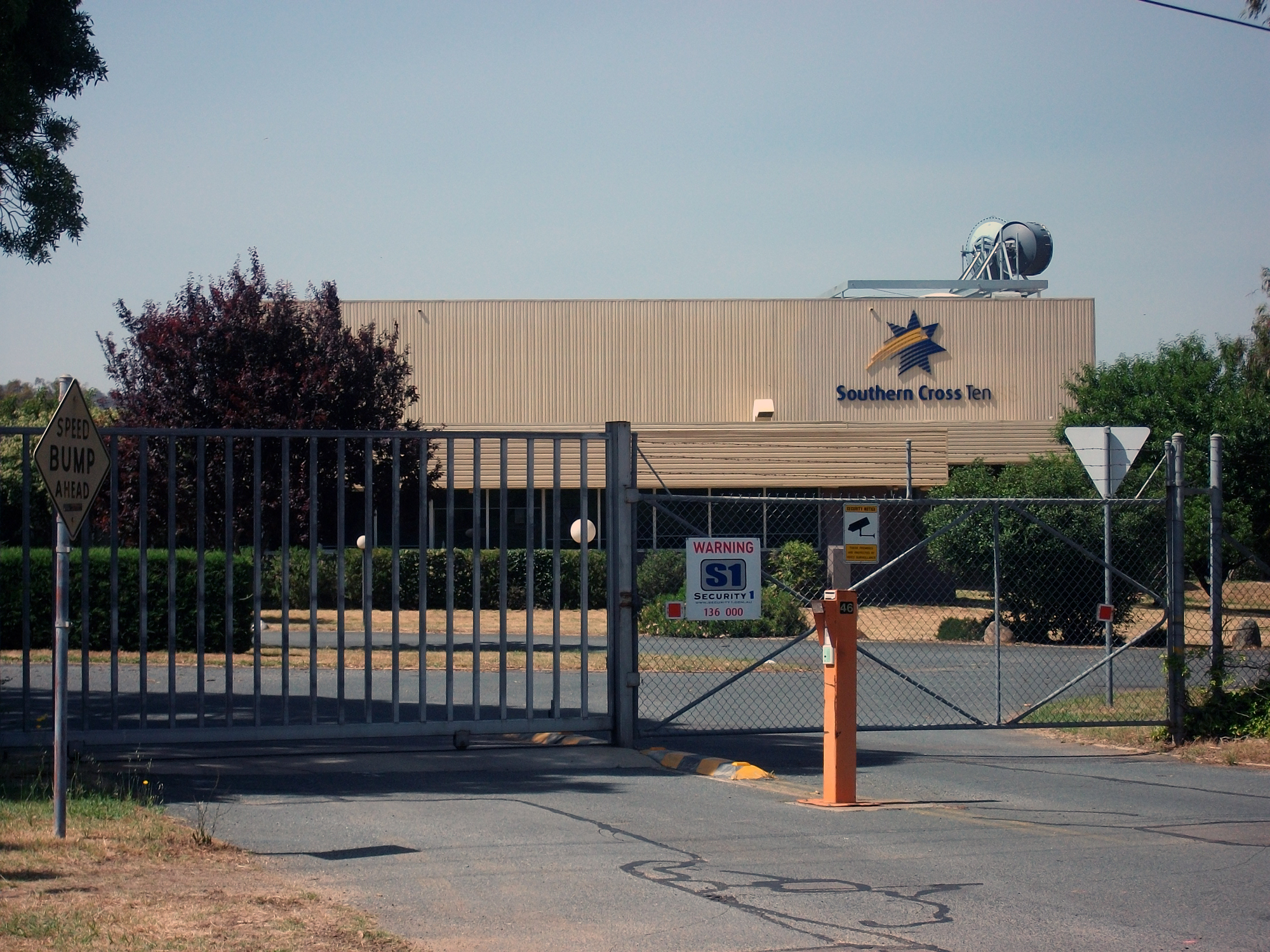
Southern Cross Austereo's former play-out broadcast centre at Aspinall Street in Watson, Australian Capital Territory in 2009.

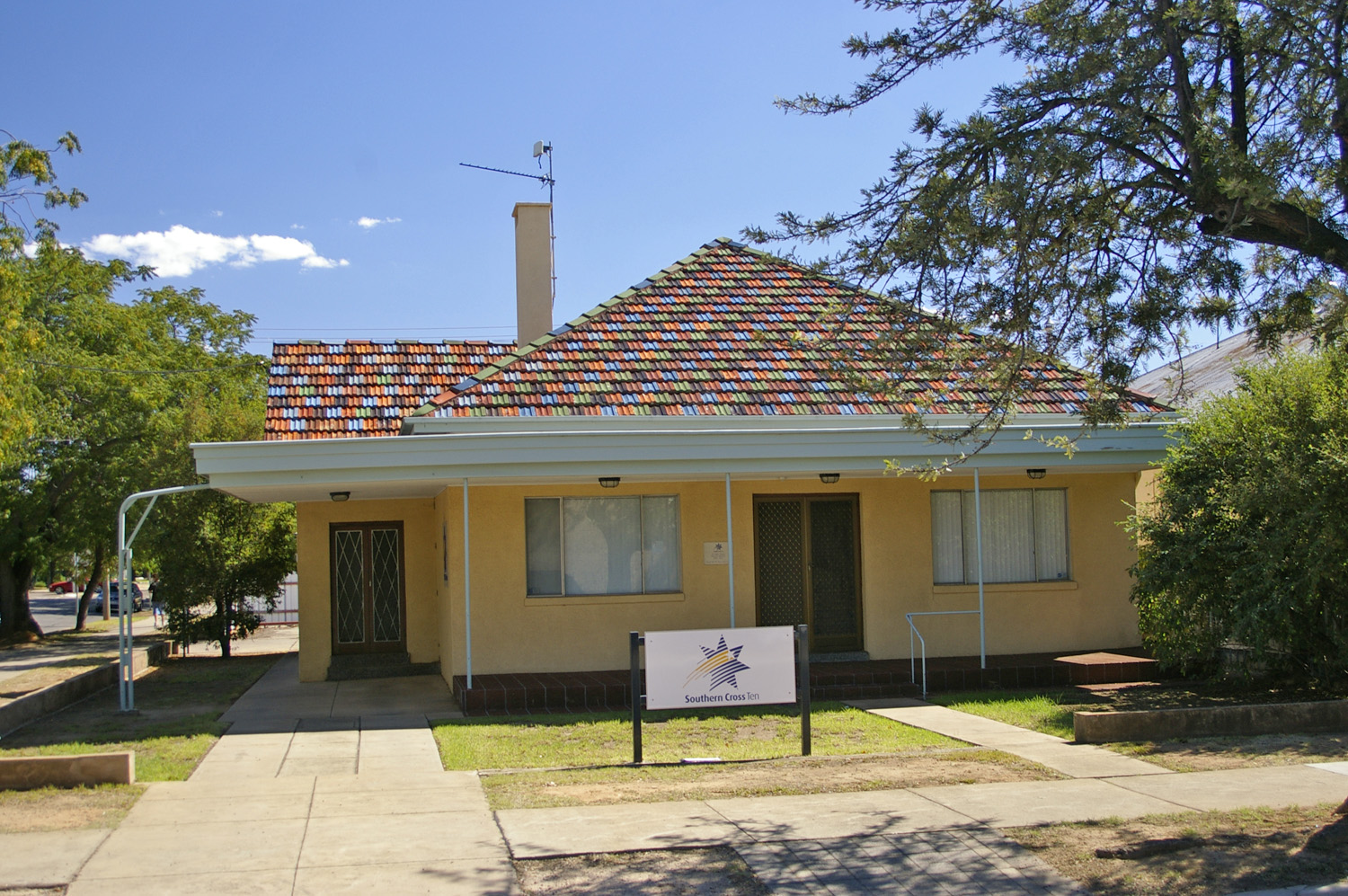
Former Southern Cross Ten sales office in Wagga Wagga, New South Wales

The network expanded into the Spencer Gulf and Broken Hill areas on 31 December 2003 under a supplementary license granted to Southern Cross GTS/BKN by the ABA.

Southern Cross Ten moved away from generic Network Ten branding – in use since the early 1990s for most areas – with a new logo, similar to that of parent company Southern Cross Broadcasting in 2005.

Southern Cross Ten logo used between 2002 and 2005

Three-minute local news updates were introduced in 2004, following recommendations put into place following the ABA's report. The brief bulletins, produced out of the network's Canberra production centre, are made for the network's seventeen license areas.

Southern Cross Ten began broadcasting MyTalk, a datacast channel owned by Southern Cross Broadcasting on 13 April 2007 on LCN 55.

It was anticipated that the network would be acquired by the Macquarie Media Group, following a A$1.35 billion takeover recommendation made to shareholders by Southern Cross Broadcasting on 3 July 2007, and on 5 November 2007, this purchase was completed.

Southern Cross Ten ceased to broadcast MyTalk on 25 February 2008, after the Macquarie acquisition.

Southern Cross Ten began broadcasting Ten's digital channel, One HD (now 10 Bold) on 2 July 2009 on LCN 50.

Southern Cross Ten began broadcasting Ten's digital channel, Eleven (now 10 Peach) on 11 January 2011 on LCN 55.

Southern Cross Ten began broadcasting Ten's datacast channel, TVSN in December 2012 on LCN 54.

Southern Cross Ten began broadcasting its own datacast channel, Aspire TV on 21 May 2013 on LCN 56.

=== 2016–2021: Affiliation with Nine Entertainment ===
On 29 April 2016, Southern Cross Austereo announced that it had signed a five-year affiliation deal with Nine Entertainment Co., owner of the Nine Network, for almost $500 million, taking the place of WIN Television as the primary regional Nine affiliate. On 1 July 2016, Southern Cross switched its primary affiliation from Network Ten to the Nine Network and Nine's metropolitan branding was introduced across Southern Cross' television assets in Queensland, Southern NSW and Victoria, joining its existing Nine affiliate station in Spencer Gulf, SA and Broken Hill, NSW. Southern Cross' Northern NSW station, NRN, was not part of the deal as the Nine-owned NBN Television already operated in the region.

Upon the affiliation change, the channel listing for Southern Cross' Nine-affiliated stations was reshuffled with Nine on channels 5 and 51, 9HD on channel 50, 9Gem on channel 52 in standard definition, 9Go! on channel 53, 9Life on channel 54 and Aspire TV on channel 56. GDS/BDN Spencer Gulf/Broken Hill remained unchanged with Nine on channel 8, 9Gem on channel 80 and 9Go! on channel 88. As a result, TVSN stopped broadcasting and was replaced with a To Be Advised slide until being replaced with Yesshop on 1 August 2016.

Due to the need to import and install the required equipment, Southern Cross originally stated that it would not immediately offer Nine's digital services 9HD and 9Life upon the transition; the broadcaster stated that they planned to begin transmitting them by mid-August—a delay which would have caused the third match of the 2016 State of Origin series on 13 July to not be transmitted in high definition in the affected regions—which includes parts of the New South Wales and Queensland regions who play the series. However, on 24 June 2016, Southern Cross announced that it had been "working tirelessly to get HD to air as quickly as possible", and 9HD became available from launch day on channel 50. The same approach also prompted 9Life to return early on 17 July 2016.

Southern Cross announced on 25 July 2016 that it would broadcast the New Zealand-based home shopping channel Yesshop as a datacast service. The channel became available on 1 August 2016 in Queensland, Southern NSW, ACT and Victoria on LCN 55. However, Yesshop's owner (Yes Retail) made the decision to cease trading on 29 September 2016 citing lack of funds to pay wages and the company's current losses of approximately 20 million dollars. Employees were terminated the same day, and the channels were removed on Freeview later that day.

Following months of negotiations, Southern Cross finalised an agreement on 28 March 2017 to sell their Ten-affiliated Northern NSW station, NRN, to WIN Television for a total of $55 million, with the sale taking effect on 31 May 2017. Due to operational logistics, WIN did not commence broadcasting their identity to the NRN market until 1 September 2017. This sale relieved Southern Cross of their only sole Ten-affiliated station, with their remaining Ten affiliate, SGS/SCN operating in the Spencer Gulf/Broken Hill region where Southern Cross holds monopoly ownership of all three network affiliates.

On 17 July 2017, Southern Cross launched American religious channel SonLife Broadcasting Network (SBN), owned by evangelist Jimmy Swaggart, as a datacast service. The channel is broadcast in regional Queensland, Southern NSW & ACT, and regional Victoria on channel 55 via Southern Cross' Nine-affiliated stations, and in Tasmania on channel 64, Spencer Gulf SA & Broken Hill NSW on channel 54, and Darwin on channel 74 via Southern Cross' Seven affiliate remaining stations.

=== 2021–2024: Return to 10 affiliation ===
On 12 March 2021, Nine announced that it would return to WIN Television as its regional affiliate in most markets beginning on 1 July 2021, in a deal that would last at least seven years. This has ended SCA's five-year agreement with the Nine Network. On 25 June 2021, SCA and Network 10 announced a two-year affiliation deal in regional Queensland, Southern NSW and regional Victoria, which introduced 10 Shake into regional areas for the very first time and it broadcasts on Channel 54, as well as Sky News Regional which launched on 1 August 2021 and it broadcasts on Channel 56. On this network, Aspire TV ceased to broadcast on 31 July 2021, to accommodate Sky News Regional.

The affiliation deal between SCA and Network 10 was extended to 31 December 2023, on 27 June 2023.

SCA began broadcasting 10's datacast channel, Gecko on 1 July 2023 on LCN 57.

=== 2024–2025: Sale of stations ===
On 17 December 2024, Southern Cross Austereo announced they are selling their regional television licenses in Regional Queensland, Southern NSW/ACT and Regional Victoria over to their affiliate Network 10. As part of the sale, SCA will receive a share of profits from the stations for the first 5 years post-completion. The sale was completed on 1 March 2025.

On 26 February 2025, Southern Cross Austereo announced they would be selling their remaining regional television licenses, including their remaining Nine and 10 affiliated stations in the Spencer Gulf and Broken Hill to Australian Digital Holdings. However, negotiations fell through and an agreement was then made with Seven West Media, owners of the Seven Network, to purchase the stations. The sale was completed on 1 July 2025 and marked SCA's exit from television broadcasting.

== Programming ==
Southern Cross's programming schedule is almost identical to that of its metropolitan counterpart, Network 10, with some differences.

The channel previously broadcast State Focus at 12pm Sunday from February 2004 until January 2009, a magazine program featuring interviews from people across the regions where the channel broadcasts. It was presented by Guy Sweeting in Southern NSW and in Canberra, Mike Frame in regional Queensland, and Judi Hogan in regional Victoria and Amy Bainbridge in Northern NSW. The channel also broadcasts infomercials, which until 2009, were shown in place of Judge Judy during the day and are in place of some other programs overnight. As well as this, locally produced programming such as Hook, Line and Sinker, Country Matters, The Hit List TV, Landed Music, The Benchwarmers Oz Made and The Hit Rater.com were also shown on the channel in the past.

=== News and current affairs ===
==== Southern Cross news updates (2004–2017) ====
Prior to 2017, short local news updates were aired throughout the day for each of the seventeen licence areas served throughout regional Queensland, New South Wales, the ACT and Victoria. These updates were broadcast throughout the network's daytime and primetime programming, hourly and lasting from one to three minutes, branded variously as Southern Cross News, Southern Cross Ten News, Southern Cross Ten Local News (2014–16) and Local News Headlines (2016–17). The updates were produced from Southern Cross Austereo's studio in Canberra and made use of news content from local radio stations owned by SCA in each market. Local sports and weather reports also aired on a sporadic basis. Short updates were also aired throughout the day and evening alongside updates from 10 News First, or from 2016, Nine News. The bulletins are researched, produced and presented by a single journalist.

Prior to the formation of the Southern Cross Ten network, the Canberra and North Queensland stations broadcast one-hour nightly localised news bulletins. However, both were axed in late 2001 due to cost-cutting measures.

Regional programming was reintroduced in March 2011 with the launch of Weeknights, a 30-minute regional news magazine program broadcast in Shepparton and the Goulburn Valley, only to be axed in May 2015.

==== Nine News Regional (2017–2021) ====
As part of the new affiliation deal between the Nine Network and Southern Cross in 2016, the Local News Headlines were phased out on their now-Nine affiliated stations and were replaced by full one-hour local Nine News bulletins produced by Nine. In August 2016, the director of Nine's news & current affairs division, Darren Wick announced that Queensland news director Mike Dalton had been appointed to head the new Nine News Regional division to initiate Nine and Southern Cross Austereo's new regional news service in 2017.

Southern Cross' Nine-affiliated stations that received the bulletins were TNQ Queensland, CTC Southern New South Wales and the Australian Capital Territory, and GLV/BCV Victoria. The bulletins were produced by Nine News, presented from Nine's existing studio facilities in Brisbane, Sydney and Melbourne respectively.

The bulletins' formats were similar in style to the Nine-owned NBN News bulletin in northern New South Wales, as a composite of international, national and local news. On 17 March 2020, production on the composite bulletins were suspended indefinitely, with reporters deployed to the metropolitan bulletins in Sydney, Melbourne and Brisbane.

==== 10 News First local updates, Sky News agreement (2021–2025) ====
Following the switch back to Network 10 affiliation on 1 July 2021, Southern Cross returned to producing local news updates after a five-year absence. The updates carry the 10 News First branding and are produced out of the networks Launceston (QLD updates) and Hobart (Southern NSW and VIC updates) studios. The Southern NSW and Canberra updates are presented by Will Boddy, the Regional Queensland updates are presented by Stacey Eldridge, and the Regional Victoria updates are presented by Sarah Bennallack. The updates, which typically don't include any corresponding news footage or soundbites, are researched, produced and presented by a single journalist. Fill-in presenters include Zeke Gaffney, Stephanie Dalton and Madeline Kerr

In May 2021, SCA reached a content agreement with Sky News Australia, under which it would distribute the new free-to-air Sky News Regional beginning 1 August 2021. The service is a de facto replacement for the Sky News on WIN service that it previously distributed.

== Availability ==
Southern Cross is available in standard definition and high definition digital format. In all areas, an additional 1080i high definition simulcast is also available. The network is available primarily through free-to-air terrestrial transmitters, with subscription cable also provided by TransACT and Neighbourhood Cable in the Australian Capital Territory and Ballarat, respectively.

Southern Cross Austereo operates the following stations which broadcast Network 10 programming:

- GLV and BCV in regional Victoria
- CTC in southern New South Wales
- TNQ in regional Queensland
- SGS in the Spencer Gulf of South Australia
- SCN in Broken Hill

== Logos ==
Southern Cross's first networked logo produced and used across its regional stations was in 2002, featuring the word Southern Cross below Network Ten's logo. This logo was used across the network until 2005, when a new logo was introduced featuring a blue and yellow star with the word Ten added beside Southern Cross. This logo was used between 2005 and 2016, and was launched concurrently with similarly designed logos on Southern Cross' Seven-affiliated stations and across Southern Cross Broadcasting's other assets.

Once Southern Cross switched affiliation to Nine on 1 July 2016, the channel switched to using full time Nine branding.

Following the reversal of the 2016 regional affiliation switch on 1 July 2021, the channel switched to using full time 10 branding.
