= MyTalk =

Defunct datacasting channel in Australia

- Broadcast area: Regional Queensland, Northern NSW, Australian Capital Territory and Southern NSW, Regional Victoria, Tasmania, Darwin, Central

Programming
- Picture format: 576i (SDTV)

Ownership
- Owner: Fairfax Media; Southern Cross Broadcasting/ Southern Cross Media

History
- Launched: 13 April 2007
- Closed: 25 February 2008, 17 years ago

Availability

Terrestrial
- SC10: LCN 55
- SCTV: LCN 66
- SCTV Darwin/Central: LCN 77

MyTalk was a Fairfax Media television channel available to viewers of digital television in Australia. MyTalk launched on 13 April 2007 and was designed to supplement the Southern Cross Ten and Southern Cross Television digital television services and the online portal. The channel was also localised for thirty markets to include international, national and local news, as well as weather updates.

== History ==
The MyTalk website began operating on 5 April 2007, with then Prime Minister of Australia, John Howard officially launching the service on 11 April that year and began operations two days later. Later in 2007, Fairfax Media bought the radio assets of Southern Cross Broadcasting for $1.35 billion, which included the MyTalk website and channel. Ceasing broadcasts, the MyTalk channel became a simulcast of the main Southern Cross Ten and Southern Cross Television channels on 25 February 2008, after Fairfax announced that they would be discontinuing the MyTalk website, and regaining their then-recently acquired radio assets their own websites.

== Features ==
MyTalk featured a twenty-four-hour television guide for the programming of Southern Cross Ten or Southern Cross Television that was localised for each broadcast market. The channel provided real-time news twenty-four hours a day, including local, national, and international news, as well as current affairs. MyTalk also provided real-time local weather reports.

MyTalk also displayed a live video preview of promotions for programming on Southern Cross Ten or Southern Cross Television. The live preview also rebroadcast regional current affairs program, State Focus, and was accompanied by a Now and Next television guide. MyTalk advertised television programs from Southern Cross Ten or Southern Cross Television via a small billboard loop. The advertising also contained billboards of the online portals features, current promotions, and upcoming promotions.

== Availability ==
MyTalk Darwin

MyTalk was broadcast in 576i standard definition in Regional Queensland, Regional New South Wales, Regional Victoria, Tasmania, and Darwin. The channel was carried via Southern Cross Television and Southern Cross Ten owned-and-operated stations, including GLV Eastern Victoria, BCV Western Victoria, CTC Southern New South Wales, NRN Northern New South Wales, TNQ Queensland, TNT Tasmania, TND Darwin, SGS Spencer Gulf and SCN Broken Hill. Southern Cross Broadcasting announced its intention to provide MyTalk via Nine Adelaide; however, after selling the station to the WIN Corporation, these plans were cancelled.

== Identity ==
MyTalk's on-air look did not change during its lifetime. The datacast channel featured a yellow and white theme. The channel also featured a small 4:3 ratio video feed at the top right of the screen. MyTalk's on-air theme was consistent with its online portal.
