= Seven (Southern Cross Austereo) =

Regional affiliates of the Seven Network in Australia

- Country: Australia
- Broadcast area: Tasmania, Darwin, Spencer Gulf SA, Broken Hill NSW, Remote Central & Eastern Australia
- Affiliates: Seven Network

Programming
- Language: English
- Picture format: 576i (SDTV) 16:9; 1080i (HDTV) 16:9 (except Remote Central & Eastern)

Ownership
- Owner: Southern Cross Austereo

History
- Launched: 9 December 1961; 64 years ago
- Closed: 1 July 2025
- Replaced by: Seven Network
- Former names: TNT-9 (Tasmania, 1980–1985); Southern Cross Network (Tasmania, 1989–1994); Southern Cross Television (Tasmania, 1994–2018)

Links
- Website: www.sca.com.au

Availability

Terrestrial
- Freeview SCA Tasmania & Spencer Gulf/Broken Hill (virtual): 6/61
- Freeview SCA Darwin & Remote (virtual): 7/71
- Freeview SCA 7HD Tasmania & Spencer Gulf/Broken Hill (virtual): 60
- Freeview SCA 7HD Darwin (virtual): 70

Seven was an Australian television network previously distributed by Southern Cross Austereo (SCA) in Tasmania, Darwin, the Spencer Gulf, Broken Hill, and remote eastern and central Australia. SCA's network was the primary affiliate of the Seven Network in the areas it served.

The sale of these stations to Seven West Media was finalised on 1 July 2025 following a previous deal with Australian Digital Holdings falling through.

== History ==
=== Origins ===
The Southern Cross brand was first used in 1982 by a small network of three stations in regional Victoria. The then Victorian Broadcasting Network comprised GLV-8 Gippsland, BCV-8 Bendigo, and STV-8 Mildura.

GLV was the first regional television station in the country, launched on 9 December 1961. BCV-8 launched in the same year, on 23 December, while STV followed four years later, on 27 November 1965. GLV-10 moved to VHF-8 in 1980, when Melbourne commercial station ATV-0 moved to VHF-10 The network rebranded in 1982 as Southern Cross TV8, but later changed its name in 1989 to the Southern Cross Network. Soon after this, STV-8 left the network after it was bought by businessman Alan Bond, and eventually sold on to ENT Limited (owners of Vic TV and Tas TV). This network began as a "cherry picking" network, taking programs from all three metropolitan commercial networks at the time. At aggregation, it became an affiliate of Network Ten.

=== 1960s to the 1970s ===
Tasmanian television station TNT-9 commenced broadcasting at 5:57 pm on 26 May 1962. Fred Archer was the first person to appear on the station, during its first five hours of transmission. On the opening night the station was officially inaugurated by Lord Rowallan, the Governor of Tasmania. The Mickey Mouse Club was the first programme to be broadcast, and advertisements included: Abbott's cordial, Hydro, Launceston Bank for Savings, Peters Ice Cream, Hicks Atkinson and the Saturday Evening Express.

GTS/BKN began transmissions as a solus commercial television service by Spencer Gulf Telecasters in the upper Spencer Gulf in 1968, with Port Lincoln and Broken Hill commencing in 1970 and 1974 respectively.

=== 1980s to the 1990s ===
On 13 May 1989, TNT-9 was sold by ENT Ltd. to Southern Cross Broadcasting and was integrated into the Southern Cross network.

Tasmania was aggregated on 30 April 1994, albeit with only two stations – Southern Cross became a dual Seven and Ten affiliate, while TAS TV took programming from the Nine Network. Both stations commenced statewide transmission from this time.

Remote Central and Eastern Australia were the final areas to be aggregated – one of the largest geographical licence areas, taking in parts of the Northern Territory, western Queensland, and other areas in which terrestrial television signals cannot be received. Stations broadcast to this area mainly through satellite or re-transmission stations. Imparja Television, based in Alice Springs, became a dual Nine and Ten affiliate, while Seven Central became a wholly Seven affiliate.

=== 2000s and 2010s ===
Southern Cross Broadcasting purchased Spencer Gulf Telecasters in April 2002. In 2002, Southern Cross Broadcasting and WIN Corporation joined forces to create Tasmanian Digital Television, which launched in late 2003. TDT was a sole Network Ten affiliate. Southern Cross operates the transmission of the station.

In 2003, Seven Darwin and Seven Central were purchased by Southern Cross Broadcasting, retaining their sole Seven Network affiliation. On 31 December 2003, Network Ten programming was broadcast for the first time to the Upper Spencer Gulf and Broken Hill broadcast areas via SGS/SCN. In May 2005, the service was integrated into the Southern Cross network.

On 3 December 2004, presentation was centralised to Southern Cross Broadcasting's play-out centre in Canberra. In May 2005, the service in Darwin was integrated into the Southern Cross network, losing its generic Seven on-air presentation. This coincided with Southern Cross Darwin commencing dual affiliations with both Seven Network and Network Ten programming.

In 2007, a joint venture station owned by Southern Cross Broadcasting and PBL Media, the owners of NTD-8 Darwin, was announced. The station, named Darwin Digital Television, began broadcasting on 28 April 2008. It is a digital-only Network Ten affiliate, similar to other digital only joint venture channels introduced in Australia.

On 3 July 2007 Southern Cross Television's parent company, Southern Cross Broadcasting, recommended Macquarie Media Group's offer of A$1.35 billion, for a takeover of the corporation. On 5 November 2007, the network was officially purchased by the Macquarie Media Group.

In early 2009, Southern Cross Tasmania dropped all of its remaining Network Ten programming, except for AFL telecasts, as it has gradually dropped other programming since 2004 when TDT was launched, which broadcast all Network Ten programming. It is now affiliated only with Seven and broadcasts all of its programming.

Southern Cross began broadcasting Racing.com on 29 August 2015, the same day the channel was officially launched, on LCN 68 in Tasmania, Broken Hill and the Spencer Gulf and on LCN 78 in Darwin.

Southern Cross announced on 25 July 2016 that it would broadcast New Zealand-based home shopping channel Yesshop as a datacast service. The channel became available on 1 August 2016 on LCN 64 in Tasmania and on LCN 74 in Darwin. However, Yesshop's owner (Yes Retail) made the decision to cease trading on 29 September 2016 citing lack of funds to pay wages and the company's current losses of approximately 20 million dollars. Employees were terminated the same day, and the channels were removed on Freeview later that day.

On 14 March 2017, a HD simulcast was announced for launch on 22 March 2017, specifically for the Tasmanian station.

From 1 July 2018, all local branding was phased out on all of the company's Seven-affiliated stations in favour of a generic Seven Network branding. Though news services offered by Southern Cross were also scheduled to be rebranded as Seven News on this date, the rebrand was delayed until further notice, citing concerns from Seven about using their news brand but not under their editorial control.

On 3 December 2018, the Tasmanian station's news bulletin changed its title to Nightly News, followed on 14 January 2019 by GTS/BKN's bulletin. Around the same time, studio production for the Spencer Gulf edition of Nightly News was relocated from Southern Cross' Canberra headquarters to TNT's Hobart studio.

=== 2025 sale to Seven West Media ===
On 27 February 2025, SCA announced the sale of their television stations in Spencer Gulf and Broken Hill, Tasmania, Darwin, and Remote Central and Eastern Australia to Australian Digital Holdings. Following the earlier announced sale of their 10-affiliated stations, this will mark SCA's exit from television broadcasting.

In May 2025, it was announced that the sale of television assets to Australian Digital Holdings had fallen through, and that Seven West Media would instead acquire the remaining television stations from SCA for $3.75 million. The sale of these stations was finalised on 1 July 2025.

== News ==
As the following stations were affiliate broadcasters of the Seven Network the following Seven News national programs were aired on these stations:

- Sunrise Early News
- Sunrise (Weekdays) & Weekend Sunrise
- Seven National News At Noon
- Seven News at 4 (Seven Afternoon News)
- Seven News at 5
- 7NEWS Spotlight

For regional news, TNT in Tasmania had their daily bulletins produced from the station's Launceston studios, while short updates for ITQ/QQQ serving remote areas and TND in Darwin, were produced from Southern Cross Austereo's studio in Hobart.

Until April 2023, GTS/BKN also produced a half-hour local news bulletin each weeknight for the Spencer Gulf and Broken Hill. In recent years, Nightly News aired on sister channel 7two and broadcast from Southern Cross' Hobart studio until the news service was closed.

== Programming ==
=== Local programming ===
Although, in the past, various birthday specials, telethons and locally produced TV shows have been aired. Quiz Quest (children's game show), The Saturday Night Show (variety), Down The Line (morning talk/local events), Targa Tasmania (annually), The Saturday Morning Fun Show (kids), Tasmanian New Faces (talent), Launceston Cup (OB) and so on.

==== Hook, Line and Sinker ====
Hook, Line and Sinker was a fishing show hosted by former news journalists Andrew Hart and Nick Duigan.

==== Renovation Relief ====
Renovation Relief was a DIY program hosted by famous wood-chopper David Foster in which he and a team of people from sponsors (i.e. Gunns) renovate a house, most commonly for people who have done something for the community or have disabled children. Renovation Relief is not airing at this time.

==== Targa Tasmania ====
For the two weeks in which Targa Tasmania ran, each night Andrew Hart and Nick Duigan share the events of the day in Targa Torque, this usually aired around 10.30 pm.

==== Holiday at Home ====
Holiday at Home was a national lifestyle program which promotes places to stay and things to do across the Australian eastern seaboard. Created by Airtrax and featuring various hosts, the program ran for several years.

==== Discover Tasmania ====
This show was produced by Southern Cross but was hosted by Seven Network personalities Ed Halmagyi and Tim Campbell and a mention was made about the Seven Network broadcast centre model in the village of Lower Crackpot in the Tasmazia maze complex. It is similar to Holiday at Home and ran for two seasons. The second season saw Tim Campbell being replaced by Jack Campbell as host because Tim Campbell had moved to the Nine Network in 2008.

==== Homes of Tasmania ====
Homes of Tasmania is screened each year showcasing the year's award-winning homes. It is hosted by Nick Duigan and Andrew Hart, like Hook Line and Sinker.

==== Going Bush ====
This was the third show hosted by Nick Duigan and Andrew Hart. It was a five-part series screening on Sunday mornings and later afternoons, about Tasmanian bushland and related topics, and co-produced with Forestry Tasmania. There have been two seasons.

==== Burnie Ten – Ten Week Challenge ====
For the ten weeks leading up to the Burnie Ten Mark Connelly trains a group of people in a program sponsored by Southern Cross. Each week there are updates given during ad-breaks. In the early years of the programme, people who took part were well known in Tasmania. However, in 2006 a Launceston family were trained to run the event.

=== Locally ===
==== Southern Cross Community Connect ====
A service provided to the community to promote community based events.

==== The Scope ====
A service that informs the viewer what is on in the area.

==== AFL NT Live Coverage ====
Seven Darwin broadcasts live coverage of the AFL NT season on sister channel 7two on weekends.

== Availability ==
Southern Cross-owned Seven affiliates were available in standard definition digital format. The network is available primarily through free-to-air terrestrial transmitters, with satellite transmissions available in Remote Central and Eastern Australia.

Southern Cross Austereo operated the following stations which broadcast Seven Network programming:

- TNT in Tasmania
- TND in Darwin
- GTS in the Spencer Gulf of South Australia
- BKN in Broken Hill
- ITQ in Mount Isa
- QQQ in Central Australia

=== High definition ===
Southern Cross launched a high definition simulcast of its main channel via TNT Tasmania in June 2009 on digital channel 60, following a period of looped HD test broadcasts. TND Darwin also provided a high definition simulcast of its main channel, on digital channel 70. Both services were replaced by 7mate on each station's respective HD channel when it launched in all Southern Cross areas on 24 October 2010; the launch of 7mate was delayed due to technical difficulties and the use of HD for coverage of the 2010 Commonwealth Games.

In March 2017, Southern Cross announced that it would be launching a high definition simulcast of its main channel, Southern Cross HD in Tasmania on digital channel 60, in time for the first match of the 2017 AFL season later that month. Although SCHD launched in Tasmania on 22 March 2017 (whilst downgrading 7mate to standard definition on digital channel 63), it only began broadcasting Channel 7 programming in native high definition from 19 June 2018.

On 26 November 2018, the HD service launched in Darwin.

== Logos ==
Southern Cross's first networked logo produced and used across its regional stations, featured a blue rounded square with the Southern Cross constellation in white. This logo was used on TNT and GLV/BCV until 1993, when GLV/BCV adopted an original logo. TNT retained the logo until 2000, when a new logo was introduced featuring an orange Tasmanian tiger above the word Southern Cross. In 2005, a new logo was produced and used across the network, this time to a blue and red star. This logo has been used since, and was launched concurrently with similarly designed logos across Southern Cross's television assets. The Seven Network brand has partially appeared through the later years and the stations were fully rebranded to a full generic network branding on 1 July 2018.
