= Regional television in Australia =

Television services outside of major cities

In Australia, regional television is the local television services outside of the five main Australian cities (Sydney, Melbourne, Brisbane, Adelaide and Perth).

== History ==
=== 1960s ===
Australia's first regional television station was launched three-and-a-half years after the rollout of television had commenced in metropolitan Sydney and Melbourne. First to launch was TVT-6 Hobart on 23 May 1960. GLV-10 in Traralgon opened on 9 December 1961 and was followed 14 days later by GMV-6 in Shepparton and BCV-8 Bendigo.

Television continued to expand in Victoria and across the country throughout the 1960s, with no fewer than twenty-five stations making their first transmissions between 1962 and 1968.

1962 station openings

- 4 March: NBN-3 Newcastle
- 17 March: CBN-8 Orange
- 18 March: WIN-4 Wollongong
- 27 April: BTV-6 Ballarat
- 12 May: RTN-8 Lismore
- 26 May: TNT-9 Launceston
- 2 June: CTC-7 Canberra
- 13 July: DDQ-10 Toowoomba
- 1 November: TNQ-7 Townsville

1963 station opening

- 7 September: RTQ-7 Rockhampton

1964 station openings

- 19 June: RVN-2 Wagga Wagga
- 7 September: AMV-4 Albury–Wodonga

1965 station openings

- 23 January: NRN-11 Coffs Harbour
- 10 April: WBQ-8 Wide Bay/Maryborough (later SEQ-8)
- 10 April: NEN-9 Tamworth
- 27 November: STV-8 Mildura
- 1 December: CWN-6 Dubbo (a relay of CBN-8 Orange)
- 15 December: MTN-9 Griffith

1966 station openings

- 25 March: SES-8 Mount Gambier
- 27 May: ECN-8 Taree
- 7 September: FNQ-10 Cairns

1967 station opening

- 10 March: BTW-3 Bunbury

1968 station openings

- 1 March: GTS-4 Port Pirie
- 9 August: MVQ-6 Mackay
- 16 August: BKN-7 Broken Hill

Many of the first stations produced their own local programming, supplemented by content from the capital city stations such as GTV-9 Melbourne's In Melbourne Tonight. GLV-10 Traralgon was amongst the first to make use of live 'off-air' relays of programmes from metropolitan stations without the use of video recording equipment.

=== 1970s ===
VEW-8 Kalgoorlie opened on 18 June 1971 and ITQ-8 Mount Isa commenced on 11 September 1971 before television reached the Northern Territory on 11 November 1971 with the launch of NTD-8 Darwin. The last regional stations to launch were GSW-9 Albany (a relay of BTW-3 Bunbury) on 29 August 1974, RTS-5A Loxton on 26 November 1976 and GTW-11 Geraldton on 21 January 1977.

Similar to their metropolitan counterparts, various stations began to form programming and operational partnerships in order to reduce operating costs and share the cost of imported programming.

Television 6-8-9 (later Mid State Television)

- CWN-6 Dubbo
- CBN-8 Orange
- MTN-9 Griffith

Television Centre of Victoria (TCV) (later TV8, then Southern Cross TV8 and then Southern Cross Network)

- BCV-8/11 Bendigo/Swan Hill
- GLV-10 Gippsland
- STV-8 Mildura

RVN-AMV (later The Prime Network)

- RVN-2 Wagga Wagga
- AMV-4 Albury

Northern Rivers–Gold Coast Television (later Northern Rivers Television)

- NRN-11 Coffs Harbour
- RTN-8 Lismore

A partnership between NRN-11 Coffs Harbour and ECN-8 Taree was split up when NRN joined RTN-8 in 1971. ECN later went into partnership with NEN-9 Tamworth.

All television stations in Australia, including regional stations, were required to convert to colour transmission in 1975.

=== 1980s ===
Stations continued to form various partnerships and networks throughout the 1980s.

North Queensland Television (later QTV)

- TNQ-7 Townsville
- FNQ-10 Cairns

SIX Network Victoria (later Television Victoria)

- GMV-6 Shepparton
- BTV-6 Ballarat
- STV-8 Mildura (joined network after purchase by ENT Limited)

TV8 (later Southern Cross TV8 and then Southern Cross Network)

- GLV-8 Gippsland
- BCV-8 Bendigo
- STV-8 Mildura (split from network after purchase by ENT Limited)

TasTV

- TVT-6 Hobart
- TNT-9 Launceston (split from network in 1989 to become Southern Cross)

Golden West Network (later GWN7, now Seven Regional WA)

- BTW-3 Bunbury
- GSW-9 Albany
- VEW-8 Kalgoorlie
- GTW-11 Geraldton

Throughout the 1980s, a number of regional stations were required to move to different frequencies. These included GLV-10 in Gippsland, who moved to channel 8 in order to allow ATV-0 Melbourne to move to channel 10 in 1980. DDQ-10 and TVQ-0 switched channels to become DDQ-0 and TVQ-10, and SEQ10 became SEQ55 in 1988.

The last regional station to launch before aggregation launched unofficially on 2 January 1988 – IMP-9, Imparja Television in Alice Springs, began transmission via the AUSSAT satellites, as well as a number of terrestrial transmitters.

==== Aggregation ====
The Hawke government of the 1980s introduced a system of regional equalisation, known as aggregation, which would provide regional viewers with the same viewing choice as their metropolitan counterparts.

Local stations protested at this proposal, arguing that their profits would fall, and that local output would also decrease. They offered their own proposal, whereby the existing operator would be allowed to operate relays of the other two networks, allowing a combination of both viewer choice and local programming. If NBN were to take the Nine affiliation, for example, their two relays would offer programs from the Seven and Ten networks, direct from Sydney. This proposal was, however, rejected.

The new system would allow stations to transmit into neighbouring markets, as an affiliate of one of the three metropolitan networks. For instance, before aggregation, there were three separate licence areas in northern New South Wales – Newcastle, New England, and the Mid North Coast, each served by a single commercial station. After aggregation, these three licence areas merged, with the three stations in direct competition for viewers.

Soon after realising they had lost their battle with the government, the stations began to organise affiliations with metro networks. Stations that hadn't joined forces beforehand began to merge and form new networks:

Vision TV (later Star Television)

- RTQ-7 Rockhampton
- DDQ-0 Toowoomba

Prime Television (later Prime7, now Seven Regional)

- CWN-6 Dubbo (previously part of Mid State Television)
- CBN-8 Orange (previously part of Mid State Television)
- MTN-9 Griffith (previously part of Mid State Television, split from network in 1989 to affiliate with WIN Television)
- RVN-2 Wagga Wagga (previously part of RVN-AMV)
- AMV-4 Albury–Wodonga (previously part of RVN-AMV)

Sunshine Television Network (callsign STQ) (now Seven Queensland)

- SEQ-8 Maryborough
- MVQ-6 Mackay

Southern New South Wales was the first area to be formed, in two phases (as a result of problems in Orange and Wagga), starting on 31 March 1989. WIN Television Wollongong (WIN-4) became an affiliate of the Nine Network, The Prime Network became a Seven affiliate, and Capital Television in Canberra became a Network Ten affiliate.

The next area to be aggregated was Queensland, which took place on 31 December 1990. QTV was to become a Nine affiliate, Star Television a Network Ten affiliate, and the Sunshine Television Network a Seven affiliate. However, in the week before aggregation was due to take place, WIN Television bought Star Television and gave them the Nine affiliation – meaning that QTV was forced to change its affiliation to Network Ten.

The next year, northern New South Wales was aggregated. NBN became the Nine Network affiliate, while the Seven Network would be carried by Prime Television, with Northern Rivers Television (NRTV) becoming the Network Ten affiliate. At one stage, WIN made its first attempt in setting up a northern New South Wales outlet by replicating the steal it had made in Regional Queensland. WIN tried to buy NRTV through bidding to steal the Nine affiliation rights from NBN, and force the latter to pick up the Ten affiliation. However, nothing came out of the deal and the respective affiliations remained as is among stations until today.

Aggregation in Victoria took place between 1992 and 1993. VIC TV became a Nine Network affiliate, Prime Television took affiliation with Seven, and SCN took affiliation with Ten. Tasmania was aggregated in 1994, albeit with only two stations – Southern Cross as a dual Seven and Ten affiliate, while Tas TV took programming from the Nine Network.

Remote and Central Australia was the final area to be aggregated – one of the largest geographical licence areas, taking in parts of the Northern Territory, western Queensland, the north west of South Australia, and other areas in which terrestrial television signals cannot be received. Stations broadcast to this area mainly through satellite or re-transmission stations. Imparja Television, based in Alice Springs, became a dual Nine and Ten affiliate, while Seven Central, based in Mount Isa, became a Seven affiliate.

A number of areas were not aggregated, due to their small size and relative inability to support more than one commercial station – these included Griffith, Mildura, Darwin and regional Western Australia.

=== 1990s ===
Throughout the 1990s, a number of changes relating to local programming and identity began to take place – the first of which was to occur for NRTV, bought out by QTV's owners, Telecasters Australia in 1993. Soon after, both stations took on generic Network Ten branding with the name Ten Northern New South Wales and Ten Queensland. Local news services were also axed in most of these areas with the exception of Townsville and Cairns. Similarly, the Southern Cross Network in Victoria changed its name and logo to a pseudo-Ten SCN design. The same network later axed local news services and changed its name to Ten Victoria, in line with moves taken by the Telecasters Australia-owned stations in New South Wales and Queensland.

NBN made similar moves in 1994, when it launched a new logo based on that of the Nine Network at the time. Sunshine Television was purchased by the Seven Network in 1995 and became nearly identical to the network's metropolitan stations under the name Seven Queensland.

WIN Corporation, meanwhile, bought VIC TV from ENT Ltd. in October 1994, and folded the station to the larger WIN Television network, maintaining the affiliation with Nine.

A second commercial licence was made available for single-licence areas such as Mildura, Griffith, and Darwin. Incumbent stations were permitted to apply for the new licence under Section 73 of the Broadcasting Services Act 1992, however only if the Australian Broadcasting Authority, at the time, felt that there was no other operator who would be interested or able to operate a new station in the area. The ABA initially denied all three stations the ability to operate the new licences.

A joint complaint to the Administrative Appeals Tribunal against the ABA and Imparja Television in 1996 found in favour of MTN-9 but against the other incumbent stations. In both the Darwin and Mildura cases, it was determined that Imparja satisfied the ABA's criteria of being in a position to run a second service in the area. Prime Television's applications in both Griffith and Mildura, for the purposes of the appeal, were rejected on the grounds of insufficient local coverage.

When the auction process ended in late 1996, however, Prime was awarded the Mildura licence for $3.2 million, and commenced broadcasting with the callsign PTV-32 in 1997. Telecasters Australia launched Seven Darwin using TND-34 in the same year, following a $2.1 million bid for the licence.

In the same year, an amendment was made to the Broadcasting Services Act affirming the ability of existing broadcasters in one and two commercial station markets to apply for "supplementary licences". These new licences allowed either a single incumbent or group of incumbents working together to run an additional channel.

In the then-single station markets, applying existing broadcasters gained both analog and digital licences for a new channel. In two station markets, the two existing broadcasters were allowed to form joint ventures to later bid for digital-only licences following the introduction of digital terrestrial television in Australia in 2001. The new licences were known as section 38A and 38B licences, respectively, after the relevant sections in the Broadcasting Services Act.

The name "Section 38A" refers to the applicable section of the Broadcasting Services Act 1992 which grants such rights to solus operators.

Using its Section 38A licence, MTN-9 was able to begin their supplementary service in 1997 using the callsign AMN-31. The new station carried almost all of sister Prime Television station CBN-8's Prime programming with the exception of local news and major sporting events broadcast by Network 10. This was allocated on 18 July 1996, and went to air in 1997, after being initially rejected by the Australian Broadcasting Authority. It is a feed of the Central West NSW station of Prime Television, and is licensed as AMN, broadcasting on UHF 31. A second licence for remote Western Australia, one of the last remaining solus markets, was put up for auction in 1998. WIN Television won the ability to broadcast to the entire regional Western Australia market (as opposed to GWN, which held separate licences in various areas), and subsequently launched its new station WOW in 1999. In the same year, WIN purchased Griffith affiliate MTN-9, as well as SES-8 Mount Gambier and RTS-5A Riverland.

=== 2000s ===
In 2000, Southern Cross Broadcasting bought out both Telecasters Australia and Central GTS/BKN, subsequently removing any remaining local references, and rebranding its new stations with the 'Southern Cross' name. Supplementary licences were also issued to SCB and WIN in parts of regional South Australia and Broken Hill, while at the same time, local programming was cut. The remote Eastern and remote Central licence areas were also merged at this time, amongst the last to be aggregated.

The solus operators in the regional licence areas of South Australia have been granted an 38A licence, being allocated on 24 April 2002.

- Spencer Gulf/Broken Hill: Central GTS/BKN, owned by Southern Cross Broadcasting was granted callsigns SGS and SCN, and branded as Southern Cross Ten, carrying Network Ten programming.
- Renmark/Loxton and Mount Gambier: WIN Television South Australia, owners of existing stations SES-8 and RTS-5A, was granted callsigns LRS and MGS, branded as WIN Ten, carrying Ten Network programming.

In more recent years, the premise has been extended to allow for two station markets where there are two different owners to apply, either separately or jointly, to operate a digital-only third station. These are known as "Section 38B" licences, and were created by the Broadcasting Services Amendment (Digital Television and Datacasting) Act 2000.

Section 38B allows current operators to apply for the additional licence either as a joint venture company, or separately; in the case where both operators apply separately to ACMA, the licence is to be allocated via auction. However, as of 2007 all of the licences so far granted under section 38B have been to joint ventures between existing operators. These licences were awarded to Tasmania (Tasmanian Digital Television, owned by WIN and Southern Cross), Mildura (Mildura Digital Television, owned by WIN and Prime), and Darwin (Darwin Digital Television, owned by PBL Media and Southern Cross).

The axing of local news services by Prime Media Group and Southern Cross Broadcasting in Newcastle, Wollongong, Queensland, Darwin and remote Central & Eastern Australia triggered a review of local content regulations by the Australian Broadcasting Authority. The ABA later ruled, in 2003, that a minimum level of local content should be provided in the four largest regional licence areas. Prime and Southern Cross responded to this by launching two-minute bulletins for all affected regions from areas in which local news was already produced, as well as in Southern Cross Ten's case the current affairs program State Focus, and on Prime, a Saturday morning children's programme Saturday Club.

In December 2003, the first digital-only commercial television station was launched, Tasmanian Digital Television, operating on a supplementary licence owned jointly by WIN Television and Southern Cross. Similarly, Mildura Digital Television began broadcasting in 2006 to Mildura, offering exclusive Ten-based programming for the first time in the area. It is a direct feed of Ten Melbourne with local advertising. Darwin Digital Television opened transmission on 28 April 2008.

During April 2007, SP Telemedia announced that it would consider selling NBN Television, and had received at least two bids, one each from WIN (in its second attempt of entering the northern NSW market) and Nine Network's owner PBL Media. On 9 May 2007, PBL Media's $250 million bid became final, winning the sale. However, upon acquiring NBN, PBL continued to operate it as a regional independent station until it was folded into the Nine Network on 1 July 2016 as a result of the regional affiliation switch between WIN Corporation and Southern Cross Austereo. The purchase also secured permanent status of supplying Nine's content to the station's entire coverage area, sparing any future affiliation switches.

=== 2010s ===
After Nine launched its new online catch-up video on demand and live streaming service 9Now on 27 January 2016, WIN filed a lawsuit against Nine, claiming that live streaming into regional areas breaches their affiliation agreement. Justice Hammerschlag of the NSW Supreme Court dismissed the case on 28 April 2016, citing that "live streaming is not broadcasting within the meaning of the PSA (program supply agreement), and that Nine is under no express or implied obligation not to do it."

Following WIN's defeat in the 9Now lawsuit, Nine announced it had signed a new $500 million affiliation deal with Network Ten affiliate Southern Cross Austereo, switching its primary Nine affiliation to stations currently affiliated with Ten in Southern NSW, ACT, and regional areas in Victoria and Queensland on 1 July 2016. As an affiliation fee to Nine, SCA would pay 50 percent of its revenue to the network. With that announcement, WIN was effectively stripped of its 27-year partnership with Nine. In response, WIN entered affiliation talks with Network Ten, reaching a final agreement on 23 May 2016. Under the new agreement, beginning 1 July 2016, WIN would carry Ten programming into regional Queensland, Southern NSW, Victoria, Tasmania, South Australia, Western Australia and the Australian Capital Territory. Deals to supply Nine programming to South Australia, and Griffith were secured on 29 June 2016, a day later Tasmania were secured as well. A supply deal for Western Australia joint venture West Digital Television was not secured before the 1 July 2016 deadline, but a deal was later finalised on 2 July 2016 with programming resuming that night.

In late January 2017, it was announced that Southern Cross had entered into negotiations with WIN Corporation, owners of regional Ten-affiliate WIN Television, over the sale of NRN in exchange for WIN's Wollongong radio station i98FM. This deal would have expanded WIN's television coverage across all regional markets in the eastern states and granted Southern Cross radio coverage in Wollongong. Southern Cross later withdrew from negotiations on 20 February 2017 with no explanation given. However, WIN and Southern Cross later finalised an agreement where they would sell NRN to WIN for a total of $55 million, with the sale taking effect on 31 May 2017. WIN, which had its third attempt for a NNSW outlet successful since 1991, maintained the station as Ten Northern NSW until playout and transmission were transferred to Mediahub on 1 September 2017, at which point the station adopted the WIN branding. Channel numbers were reshuffled to align with WIN's other stations; but as Nine owned NBN Television holds the 8 numbered digital channels, NRN's channels remained on the 5 numbered channels.

=== 2020s–present ===
On 12 March 2021, Nine announced that it would return to WIN Television as its regional affiliate in most markets beginning 1 July 2021, in a deal that would last at least seven years. This would include WIN paying half of its regional advertising revenue to Nine Entertainment Co., and providing advertising time for Nine's properties on WIN's radio and television outlets. WIN would also provide advertising sales services for Nine's owned-and-operated stations NBN and NTD (with the former succeeding a similar agreement it had with SCA). Nine CEO Hugh Marks explained that "while our relationship with Southern Cross has been strong over the last five years, the opportunities presented by the WIN Network to both extend the reach of Nine's premium content into more regional markets under one agreement, and to work cooperatively with them on a national and local news operation, mean this is the right time for us to return to WIN." As a result, SCA was forced to switch its television affiliation back to Network 10 after 5 years.

Alongside the affiliation switch on 1 July 2021, WIN as a sole network brand was retired after 32 years with its stations carrying Nine metro branding with WIN branding used for local idents, sponsor billboards and community noticeboards respectively. However WIN News is retained under its current name and format. With WIN and SCA using network branding from Nine and Network 10 respectively, it left Prime7 as the only regional network not fully using its metro affiliate branding – a distinction maintained until June 2022.

According to the channel changes, Nine's channel listing was reshuffled with 9Gem on channel 81, 9Go! on channel 82 and 9Life on channel 83, while Ten's listing was reshuffled with 10 Peach on channel 52, 10 Bold on channel 53, 10 Shake on channel 54, SBN on channel 55 and Sky News Regional on channel 56.

==== Seven and Ten take over regional stations ====
On 1 November 2021, Seven West Media announced that it would acquire all the shares and subsidiaries of Prime Media. Prior to this, Seven's previous attempt in 2019 was blocked by shareholders Antony Catalano, co-owner of Australian Community Media, and Bruce Gordon, owner of competitor WIN Corporation. Both felt that Seven's offer of $60 million for the company was too low. Seven announced at the time that local news production would continue. The majority of Prime's shareholders voted in favour of the deal on 23 December, and the takeover was completed on 31 December.

In 2022, Prime7 and GWN7 as sole network brands were retired after 11 years as reflection to Seven Network's takeover. The transition to Seven's branding was done in stages: its regional network was rebranded as Seven by June; local idents, sponsor billboards and community noticeboards adopted the Seven network branding around July; while its regional news division carried the Seven News brand on 25 July, but retaining its current operations pre-acquisition.

On 17 December 2024, SCA announced the sale of their regional television licenses in Regional QLD, Southern NSW/ACT and Regional Victoria to Network 10. As part of the sale, SCA will receive a share of profits from the stations for the first 5 years post-completion. Three months later, on 27 February 2025, it also announced the sale of its remaining regional television licenses to Australian Digital Holdings. By that May, the deal had fallen through and it was announced that Seven West Media would instead acquire the remaining television stations from SCA for $3.75 million. The Network 10 transaction was completed on 1 March 2025; the sale of other licences to SWM was finalised four months later on 1 July 2025, marking SCA's exit from television. The Seven purchase completion that day coincided with WIN Network's pullout of the former's programming following both parties not reaching an agreement to renew their programme and supply agreement in the Riverland, Mount Gambier and Griffith areas. The PSA for those areas was eventually agreed upon two days later on 3 July, with Seven's programming resume to WIN-owned stations at 5:00 pm AEST/ACST.

On 13 February 2025, Network 10 announced they are also acquiring their affiliate in Northern NSW/Gold Coast from WIN, which was later completed on 1 May.

The completion of all transactions by Seven and 10 meant that all three commercial stations in Northern New South Wales and the Gold Coast (not counting the transmitters operating as relays of Brisbane-based outlets) are now owned-and-operated by their associated networks' parent companies. It also made primary Nine affiliates WIN and Imparja as the remaining third-party broadcasters in regional and remote Australia.

== Broadcasting ==
=== Three station markets ===
The majority of these licence areas are on the more densely populated east coast, in which three commercial stations are each affiliated to the Seven Network, Nine Network and Network 10 from their respective capital cities. In addition to these, digital television channels from ABC Television and SBS Television are also available. The majority of these areas were aggregated in the late 1980s and early 1990s. The following are current affiliates as of June 2026.

Northern New South Wales (includes the Gold Coast)

- Seven Northern NSW (Seven Network owned and operated)
- WIN Television's Nine Northern NSW (Nine)
- 10 Northern NSW (Network 10 owned and operated)

Southern New South Wales & ACT (includes Metropolitan areas of Canberra)

- Seven Southern NSW & ACT (Seven Network owned and operated)
- WIN Television's Nine Southern NSW & ACT (Nine)
- 10 Southern NSW & ACT (Network 10 owned and operated)

Regional Victoria

- Seven Regional Victoria (Seven Network owned and operated)
- WIN Television's Nine Regional Victoria (Nine)
- 10 Regional Victoria (Network 10 owned and operated)

Regional Queensland

- Seven Queensland (Seven Network owned and operated)
- WIN Television's Nine Regional Queensland (Nine)
- 10 Regional Queensland (Network 10 owned and operated)

=== Areas with supplementary licences ===
These licence areas are not as heavily populated as the main markets listed above. Consequently, only two broadcasters operate in these areas, with a jointly owned supplementary service that provides the services of the remaining network. These supplementary services are italicised. ABC Television and SBS Television services are also available regardless, throughout these areas.

Tasmania (includes Metropolitan areas of Hobart and southern Tasmania)

- Seven Tasmania (Seven Network owned and operated)
- WIN Television's Nine Tasmania (Nine)
- Tasmanian Digital Television (Ten)

Mildura/Sunraysia, Victoria
(includes surrounding border regions of New South Wales)

- Seven Mildura (Seven Network owned and operated)
- WIN Television's Nine Mildura (Nine)
- Mildura Digital Television (Ten) [ceased broadcasting on 30 June 2024]

Darwin, Northern Territory

- Seven Darwin (Seven Network owned and operated)
- WIN Television's Nine Darwin (Nine)
- Darwin Digital Television (Ten)

Regional and Remote Western Australia

- Seven Regional WA (Seven Network owned and operated)
- WIN Television's Nine Regional WA (Nine)
- West Digital Television (Ten)

Remote Eastern and Central Australia

- Seven Central (Seven Network owned and operated)
- Imparja Television (Nine)
- Central Digital Television (Ten)

==== Monopoly areas ====
Similarly to the jointly owned supplementary services provided in the above markets, in markets where only one broadcaster operates, the broadcaster would provide two regular network services, with the remaining network provided as a supplementary service.

Griffith/MIA, New South Wales
(WIN Corporation monopoly)

- Seven Griffith (Seven)
- WIN Television's Nine Griffith (Nine)
- 10 Griffith (Ten)

South Eastern South Australia and the Riverland
(WIN Corporation monopoly)

- Seven SA (Seven)
- WIN Television's Nine SA (Nine)
- 10 SA (Ten)

Spencer Gulf, South Australia/Broken Hill, New South Wales (Southern Cross Media Group monopoly)

- Seven GTS/BKN (Seven Network owned and operated)
- Nine GDS/BDN (Nine)
- 10 SGS/SCN (Ten)

== Programming ==
1: Network feed. 2: State feed. 3: Local feed. 4: Programming aired on a television station

Each commercial network (both regional and metropolitan) can be seen as being composed of three layers, with some exceptions. The first is the "national feed" – content that is broadcast to the entire country, more-or-less at the same time (accounting for time zones and minor rescheduling). This category is composed of nearly all the non-news programs and sometimes station promotions and branding.

The second is the "state feed", content that is broadcast to the entire state or territory. It comprises mainly state news, as well as current affairs programs and station promotions. This is usually the case in Victoria, New South Wales, Queensland, South Australia and Western Australia. The third is the "local feed", content broadcast to a specific market, such as local news and advertising.

=== Original programming ===
In order to fulfil regulations put in place by the Australian Communications & Media Authority, the majority of regional networks are required to provide original, locally targeted output such as news, current affairs, or children's programmes.

WIN Television, Australia's largest regional network, used to produce a number of programs including sports magazine show Fishing Australia, cooking show Alive and Cooking, and travel shows Destinations and Postcards Australia. Southern Cross (now Seven Network) in Tasmania previously aired Hook, Line and Sinker alongside a range of other regional programs.

Up until its co-branding with Channel Seven, both Prime and GWN produced their own versions of The Saturday Club. Prime also produced country music show A Little Bit of Country as well as an agricultural news program, On the Land. After those shows no longer aired, Prime7 and GWN7 showed just Seven Network programming before it was merged with the Seven Network.

Imparja Television also produce various local indigenous programs, as well as Yamba's Playtime, a daily show for pre-school children. Most Imparja-produced programming is also shown on National Indigenous Television.

=== News ===
ACMA regulations have, since 2003, required stations to provide minimum levels of local news and other content.

- WIN Television produces three half-hour statewide and three local WIN News bulletins for regional markets, airing at 5:30pm on weeknights. Until 2021, the network also produced WIN’s All Australian News, composed of stories from WIN's regional bulletins. In four markets, short news updates are broadcast throughout the day, generally to fulfill local content quotas.
- WIN Television via NBN produces a half-hour long news service, NBN News, containing local news, sport and weather for its entire coverage area, airing weeknights at 5:30pm. NBN News was considered as the only mainland regional station to produce a one-hour news bulletin 365 days a year. As part of the weeknight bulletins, the station produces local opt-outs for each of its six sub-regions.
- Seven's mainland stations that were formerly branded as Prime7, Prime Television, GWN7 and the Golden West Network, produces half-hour bulletins in five markets in New South Wales and Victoria; as well as in Western Australia under the Seven News banner (former names include Prime Local News, Prime News and Prime7 News for regional NSW and regional Victoria; and Golden West News/GWN News and GWN7 News for regional WA). In other areas, Seven produces short updates to fulfill quota requirements.
- Seven Tasmania produces a local edition of 7 NEWS (formally Southern Cross News and Nightly News), a nightly hour-long bulletin incorporating local, national & international news from studios in Launceston. Under previous owners, Southern Cross Austereo, the station also used to produce a 30-minute local bulletin on weeknights for the Spencer Gulf/Broken Hill area of South Australia, until it was axed in 2023.
- Seven Queensland produces half-hour bulletins in each of its seven coverage areas (Cairns, Townsville, Mackay, Central Queensland, Darling Downs, Wide Bay–Burnett and the Sunshine Coast).
- The Brisbane stations of Nine and Seven both produce half-hour bulletins for the Gold Coast at 5:30pm, airing as an opt-out on the respective station's Gold Coast transmitters.
- For the remote central and eastern Australia licence area, Seven Central and Imparja Television both air short news updates each weekday.
- Network 10 airs short local news updates in Queensland, Northern New South Wales, Southern New South Wales, the ACT, Regional Victoria and Darwin each weekday during the networks daytime and prime time programming across fourteen markets.

In most cases, newsroom staff including reporters, camera crews and producers are based in newsrooms within the coverage area though the news program itself may be presented and broadcast from studios outside the region. For example, news staff for Seven's Mackay bulletin is based in the city with the program presented from studios in Maroochydore.

=== Scheduling ===
The majority of programming in regional areas is shown at the same time as its metropolitan counterpart, with some exceptions, mainly for local news programs. Prior to the 2016 media shakeup, A Current Affair was shown at 7.30pm rather than 7.00pm in most WIN regions via then-HD multichannel 9Gem (GEM prior to 2015) (Tasmania and markets without a WIN News bulletin received the programme in its original timeslot on the main channel). NBN had aired the program on delay at 7pm until the expansion of Nine's metropolitan local bulletins in January 2014, allowing the station to air ACA at the same time as in Sydney.

Seven’s regional stations (then known as Prime7) had aired Seven News on delay at 6.30pm in markets that receive full local bulletins at 6.00pm until the major expansion of Seven's metropolitan local bulletins in February 2014, allowing the stations to extend both the regional bulletins at the same time as in Sydney and Melbourne. In its current format, full bulletin markets served by stations CBN and NEN receive a combined newshour composed of the usual local news bulletin at 6:00pm, followed by a live statewide bulletin named Seven News at 6.30, covering national stories shown on Seven News in metropolitan markets; AMV transmitters in the Albury and NSW/Victoria border areas receive a delayed shortened first segment of Seven News Melbourne at 6.30pm after the local news, then switches back to the live Melbourne feed for sport and weather.

In the last ten years of the original 27 year affiliation agreement with Nine, WIN Television launched a range of original programs such as fishing program Fishing Australia, cooking program Alive and Cooking local daytime news program Daily and local daytime talk show Susie. Susie was launched during 2007 as a replace at the time for Nine's Mornings With Kerri Anne due to affiliation disputes with Nine. It was hosted by former GMA regular Susie Elelman, the show covered a range of topical issues including health, parenting, cooking, fitness, fashion, gardening, beauty and relationships. Like Mornings, the show also included advertorials. Due to four different timeslot changes and disputes within network management, Susie was cancelled by WIN Television in late 2009. Alive and Cooking was launched as a replacement for Fresh with the Australian Women's Weekly a joint venture with the Australian Women's Weekly and Nine Network. It was hosted by U.K. Celebrity Chef James Reeson. In the show, Reeson would demonstrate easy to prepare dishes in the studio and sometimes on location. The show produced 11 seasons. Daily was presented by Susie Elelman and Bianca Dye. The show covered news, views, topical issues and entertainment. It lasted one season.

Prior to the development of digital television broadcasting, many dual-network affiliates, such as WIN SA broadcast a mix of programming from three networks at differing times of the week, WIN WA and Imparja, broadcast a mix of programming from two networks at differing times of the week. Prior to the co-branding with Seven, Prime and GWN choose to replace nearly all Seven Network programs between midnight and 6am with infomercials, along with 10 Regional (the former Southern Cross Ten), which also replaced some morning programs and until late 2009 Judge Judy with infomercials.

Prior to 2016, NBN opted to air classic programs (The Sullivans), its own Today Extra program until 2007 and infomercials in place of Nine's Morning News.

As of April 2023, local news, special events coverage and paid programming (infomercials) are the only occurrences of regional TV programming in Australia.

== See also ==
- 2016 Australian regional television realignment
