= Aspire TV (Australian TV channel) =

Australian television channel

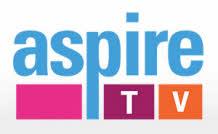
- Logo used between 2013 and 2021
- Country: Australia
- Broadcast area: Regional QLD, Southern NSW & ACT, Northern NSW, Regional VIC, Spencer Gulf SA, Broken Hill NSW, Tasmania, Darwin
- Network: SCA 10; SCA Seven

Programming
- Language(s): English
- Picture format: 576i (SDTV) 16:9

Ownership
- Owner: Southern Cross Austereo; Brand Developers
- Sister channels: SCA 10; 10 HD; 10 Bold; 10 Peach; 10 Shake (now Nickelodeon); SCA Nine; 9HD; 9Gem; 9Go! 9Life; SCA Seven; 7HD; 7two 7mate SBN; TVSN; Racing.com

History
- Launched: 21 May 2013; 12 years ago
- Closed: 31 July 2021; 3 years ago
- Replaced by: Racing.com (on Seven affiliates); Sky News Regional (on 10 affiliates)

Availability

Terrestrial
- Freeview SC10/SC9 owned (virtual): 56
- Freeview SC7 owned (virtual): 66/76

Aspire TV was an Australian advertorial datacasting channel launched on 21 May 2013, owned by Southern Cross Austereo and Brand Developers, as a result of SCA bundling and discounting its television and radio advertising rates. The channel operated a full-time format of mostly US produced paid programming and, to a lesser extent, other paid program content including religious programming. Though datacasting was intended by the Labor government of the time to broadcast telecourses and other non-commercial content, without any legislative restriction on its use, most Australian broadcasters have utilized the datacasting services for teleshopping instead. For the most part however, the general public has ignored these datacasting teleshopping channels, resulting in their swift discontinuation.

Aspire TV ceased broadcasting in Tasmania and Darwin on 29 August 2015 in order to accommodate for the launch of Racing.com; and in Spencer Gulf, SA and Broken Hill, NSW via SGS/SCN on 1 July 2016.

On the same day, SCA switched its primarily affiliated Ten-affiliated stations to the Nine Network. Consequently, SCA's then new Nine-affiliates' channel listing was reshuffled to place Nine on channels 5 and 51, 9HD on channel 50, 9Gem on channel 52, 9Go! on channel 53, 9Life on channel 54, TBA on channel 55 and Aspire TV on channel 56. As a result, TVSN, which was previously broadcast on channel 54, moved to rival network WIN Television on channel 84.

In Northern NSW, Aspire TV ceased broadcasting via Ten Northern NSW on 31 August 2017, due to WIN Television taking over ownership of NRN. In Southern NSW, Regional Victoria and Regional Queensland, Aspire TV ceased broadcasting on 31 July 2021 to accommodate for the launch of Sky News Regional.

The logo and on-air graphics for Aspire TV were designed by Lucid Edge and Splash Agency respectively.

== See also ==
- List of digital television channels in Australia
