= Travelcade =

Award-winning Australian travel documentary

Travelcade is an Australian travel documentary series that was produced in Townsville, North Queensland. It debuted on 21 July 1990 and ran regularly through the 1990s, on Australian television. It was one of the first Australian travel shows produced and was a breakthrough for local production at a time when regional and Australian television series were at a minimum.

Organisations like the National Film and Sound Archive of Australia (NFSA) describe Travelcade as being unique, due to it having the approach of a pictorial current affairs program, as opposed to a straight documentary: it had a news angle, and also featured the cultural, historical, environmental and social impacts, in addition to in-depth interviews with the locals and characters of the destination.

== History ==
Travelcade was the first Australian weekly holiday and travel show to go to air in Queensland and was produced and directed by journalist and producer Rick Anderton for Anderton Enterprises and N.Q Media Services. It was a half-hour weekly television program that featured resorts, holidays destinations, events and attractions involved in tourism and travel throughout Australia and the Asia Pacific region.

The program first aired in 1990 as a trial called Travelcade '90 and later changed its name to Travelcade. The program initially started out featuring different travel highlights around Queensland and then extended across Australia and to the Asia Pacific region.

The first show broadcast in 1990 reported on what people in Far North Queensland were doing to cope in the wake of the 1989 pilots’ dispute. It took a look at how Queensland promoted itself internationally and overseas and how Australia was seen as a tourist destination by TV viewers.

== Achievements ==
Travelcade ran for 6 years, and became one of the longest running travel documentaries in Australia at its time. It was relayed to an estimated 6.8 million viewers throughout Australia and Oceania. Broadcast areas included Queensland, New South Wales, Victoria, Central Australia and Papua New Guinea on the TEN Queensland, Prime and the QSTV Satellite Networks.

It was praised by tourism bodies for its coverage and authenticity. In 1991 it won the Queensland Tourist and Travel Award for Electronic Media. It won the 4MK/Whitsunday Tourism Award in 1994, and was twice a finalist in the Australian Tourism Awards.

== Notable episodes – locations and stories ==
Travel Cruises and Adventure Stories

Savannaland Train Ride – Pure Pleasure Diving Cruise – Royland Whitsunday Island Cruise – Coral Princess Reef and Island Cruise – Lexus Marlin Deep Sea Fishing Classic - Atlantic Clipper Ocean Spirit Cruises – Captain Cook Island Cruises – P&O South Pacific Cruise – Indian Pacific Sydney to Perth – Kangaroo Explorer Cruise – Advanced Driving – Hinchinbrook Kayaking and Yachting – Tiger Moth Scenic Flights – Top End 4 Wheel Drive Safari – Raging Thunder Rafting – Down to the Lower Sepik River – Hinchinbrook Rent-a-yacht

Australian Islands

Fraser Island – Green Island – Long Island – South Molle – Dunk Island – Bedarra Island – Kepple Island – Magnetic Island – Orpheus Island – Double Island – Lizard Island – Hamilton Island – Hayman Island – Fitzroy Island – Heron Island – Brampton Island – Daydream Island – Lady Elliot Island – Hinchinbrook Island – Fantasia Island

Wet Tropics Locations

Wallaman Falls – Lake Eachum – Barron Gorge – Kuranda – Mount Spec Ranges – Jourama Falls – Mungalli Falls – Tully Gorge – Lake Placid – Murray Falls – Daintree National Park

Queensland

Town of 1770 – O’reilleys Resort – Cherrabah Homestead – Bunya Park – Ginger Factory – Billabong Sanctuary – Coolangatta – Silky Oaks – Daintree Lodge – Mission Beach – Airlie Beach – Noosa – Malaney – Montville Sunshine Coast – Binna Burra – Laguna Quays – Greenvale Outback Resort – Kroombit Homestead Holiday Farm – Cairns Colonial Club – Kohuna Hervey Bay – Gympy – Roma – Ranvenshoe – Reef Wonderland Townsville – Reef Casino Cairns – Hall of Fame Longreach – Undara Lava Tubes – Coconut Beach – Butterfly Farm Kuranda – Port Douglas – Finch Hatton Gorge – Carnarvon Gorge – Gunpowder Station Lawn Hill – Lake Tinaroo – Paradise Palms – Capricorn International Resort – Olsens Cave – Cooktown – Palm Cove – Wetherby Station – Santan Port Douglas – Cassowary Licuala Trail – Maryborough – Chilligoe Caves – Hervey Bay

New South Wales

Sydney – Hunter Valley – Vineyards – Balloon Riding – Eagle Reach

Gold Coast

Seaworld – Warner Bros Movie World – Dreamworld – Wet and Wild – Sanctuary Cove – Jupiters Casino – Coolangatta Twin Cities – Royal Pines Resort – Sheraton Mirage Resort

Western Australia

Wave Rock – Albany – Monkey Mia – Broome – Cable Beach – Pilbara – Hammersly Gorges – Joondalup – Margaret River Vineyards – Whale World Albany – Vines Resort – Karri Giants of Pemberton – Merribrook – Freemantle – Observation City – Pearl Farming off the North Coast

Tasmania

Hobart – Port Arthur – Cradle Mountain – Strahan – Freycinet – West Coast

New Zealand

Roturua – Queenstown – Milford Sound – Auckland – Hotel De Vin – Taraware Volcano – Contiki Backpacker Tour – Black Water Rafting – North Island Rainforest – Watamo Caves

Philippines Locations

Manila – Boracay Island – Cebu Beach – Devao – Eagle Sanctuary – Mindanao – Evergreen Gold Resort – Samal Island Resort – Puerto Princesca Island

Papua New Guinea

Port Moresby Hiri Moala Festival – Lae – Rabaul (before and after volcanic eruptions) – Kavieng – Manus Island – Walindi Hot Springs – Trobriand Islands – Amphlett Islands – Mount Hagen – Smoken Bodies of Aseki – Goroka – Sepik River – Mudmen of Asaro – Kokoda Trail – New Ireland – Huli Wigmen of Tari Basin – Bilolo Highlands

== People ==
- Rick Anderton – executive Producer and director of Travelcade
- Gavin Alder – journalist
- Christina Amies – presenter
- Joanne Desmond – presenter
- Larry Schmidt – cameraman
- Wade Sinclair – Caameraman

Notable interviews

- Paul Terry – Actor "Anzacs"
- Colleen McCollough – Australian author
