= Newsweek (TV program) =

Current affairs television program of Australia

Newsweek is an Australian 30-minute local current affairs television program that was broadcast weekly on regional television in Australia from 1978 to 1989, prior to the aggregation of Australian television. Newsweek was produced and directed in Townsville, for North Queensland Television (NQTV). The program became one of Australia's longest running current affairs television programs of its era. It was also the longest running current affairs show in Queensland.

Newsweek dealt with local North Queensland issues, distinct to the national focus of other current affairs shows of the time, such as A Current Affair.

== History ==
The show began in 1978 on a shoestring with just a team of three who also juggled fitting the program in with a daily local television news service and four radio news bulletins. However the show had a regular spot on Friday night prime time TV and by 1982 had won three national Thorn EMI Awards for TV news with the news features being broadcast nationally via all three Southern networks.

In May 1984 two journalists won another two awards for the program as the judges were impressed with the expertise and professional skills which had become a trademark of Australian television news reporting.

In 1984 a decision was made to design a new set to increase live content of the show and help the program's host and reporters present the North's current affairs nearly as they happened.

The set paid off and in 1988 Newsweek had picked up no less than 16 national Thorn Emi Awards for Australian television news production and reporting with many of the reporters being offered positions with the main television networks in Australia.

== Reporters ==
- Rick Anderton
- Mike D'Arcy
- Graham Lever
- Sally Begbie
- Chris Hill
- Jennene Rogers
- Paula Bycroft
- Craig Burgess

== Thorn EMI Awards ==
The Thorn EMI Awards were originally the only national awards exclusive to Australian television news. Initially only twelve were awarded, annually.

The purpose of the awards was to recognise excellence in the on-screen and behind the scenes television news industry talent of Australia.

Within 10 years Newsweek won 16 Thorn EMI Awards for television news production and reporting.
