= ITQ =

ITQ may refer to:

- Individual Transferable Quota, permits to harvest fish
- QQQ, an Australian television station using call sign ITQ in Mount Isa, Queensland
- In the United Kingdom, an NVQ in information technology, commonly known as ITQ
