= Southern Cross Broadcasting =

Defunct Australian media company

Southern Cross Broadcasting (Australia) Limited
- Type: Public
- Traded as: ASX: SBC
- Industry: Media
- Founded: 20 August 1987
- Defunct: 5 November 2007
- Fate: Acquired by Macquarie Media Group; Certain assets sold off to Fairfax Media
- Successor: Fairfax Media; Macquarie Media Group
- Headquarters: Melbourne, Australia
- Key people: Tony Bell (Managing Director); John Dahlsen (Chairman)
- Products: Radio; Television
- Revenue: $525 million (2007)
- Net income: $61 million (2007)
- Website: www.southerncrossbroadcasting.com.au

Southern Cross Broadcasting was a diversified Australian media company, that owned and operated a variety of media businesses, primarily in radio and television.

== History ==
In September 1998 Southern Cross Broadcasting (SCB) purchased Adelaide Channel Nine station NWS from the Lamb family adding to its television assets of Ten Capital in Canberra and southern New South Wales, Ten Victoria in regional Victoria and Southern Cross Television, which televised both Seven Network and Network 10 programming into Tasmania.

In May 2001 SCB announced a $217 million bid for Telecasters Australia, owner of television stations in regional Queensland, northern New South Wales, Darwin and Remote/Central Australia markets. In April 2002 it purchased Spencer Gulf Telecasters, owner of regional South Australia's GTS/BKN stations.

In May 2007 SCB sold Channel Nine Adelaide to WIN Corporation. In July 2007 Southern Cross Broadcasting's board recommended Macquarie Media Group's takeover offer be accepted.

At the same time, Macquarie Media Group entered have a separate scheme of arrangement to on-sell Southern Cross Broadcasting's radio assets to Fairfax Media, as well as the Southern Star Group, Satellite Music Australia and its digital media businesses. Only Southern Cross's television stations remained with Macquarie Media Group. The transactions were completed on 5 November and 9 November 2007.

== Assets ==
=== Television stations ===
- Southern Cross Ten
  - CTC – Australian Capital Territory/Southern NSW (Canberra)
  - GLV/BCV – Victoria (Bendigo, Ballarat, Gippsland, Albury–Wodonga)
  - NRN – Northern NSW/Gold Coast (Newcastle, Central Coast, North Coast, Northern Rivers, Gold Coast)
  - TNQ – Queensland (Toowoomba, Mackay, Rockhampton, Townsville, Cairns)
  - SGS/SCN – South Australia (Spencer Gulf region of South Australia and Broken Hill, New South Wales)
- Southern Cross Television
  - TNT – Tasmania (Hobart and Launceston)
  - TND – Northern Territory (Darwin)
  - GTS/BKN – South Australia (Spencer Gulf region of South Australia and Broken Hill, New South Wales)
  - QQQ – Central Australia (Remote Eastern, Southern and Central Australia)
- Tasmanian Digital Television (50% share with WIN Corporation)
- Channel Nine Adelaide (NWS) (Channel Nine station located in Adelaide) (Purchased by WIN Corporation on 30 May 2007)
- MyTalk

=== Radio stations ===
- Talk stations
  - 2UE
  - 3AW
  - 4BC
  - 6PR
- Music stations
  - Magic 1278
  - 4BH
  - 96fm

=== Other businesses ===
- Southern Star Group
