= Aspire TV =

Aspire TV may refer to:

- Aspire TV (American TV network), an American pay television network
- Aspire TV (Australian TV channel), a former home shopping datacasting television channel in Australia
