= GTS/BKN =

Regional TV stations in Australia

- GTS: Spencer Gulf, South Australia BKN: Broken Hill, New South Wales; Australia
- Channels: Digital: GTS: 44 (UHF) GDS: 42 (UHF) BKN: 9 (VHF) BDN: 7 (VHF)
- Branding: Seven Spencer Gulf; Seven Broken Hill; Nine Spencer Gulf; Nine Broken Hill

Programming
- Language: English
- Affiliations: GTS/BKN: Seven (O&O); GDS/BDN: Nine

Ownership
- Owner: Seven Media Group; (GTS: Spencer Gulf Telecasters Pty Ltd BKN: Broken Hill Television Pty Ltd)
- Sister stations: SGS/SCN

History
- First air date: GTS: 1 March 1968; BKN: 16 August 1968
- Former channel numbers: Analog: GTS: 4 (VHF); BKN: 7 (VHF)
- Former affiliations: Independent (1968–2006)
- Call sign meaning: GTS: Spencer Gulf; Telecasters; South Australia; BKN: BroKen Hill; New South Wales; GDS: GTS; Digital; South Australia; BDN: BKN; Digital; New South Wales

Technical information
- Licensing authority: Australian Communications and Media Authority
- ERP: GTS: 240 kW; BKN: 4 kW
- HAAT: GTS: 627 m (digital); BKN: 104 m
- Transmitter coordinates: GTS: 33°6′14″S 138°9′51″E; BKN: 31°57′5″S 141°26′25″E

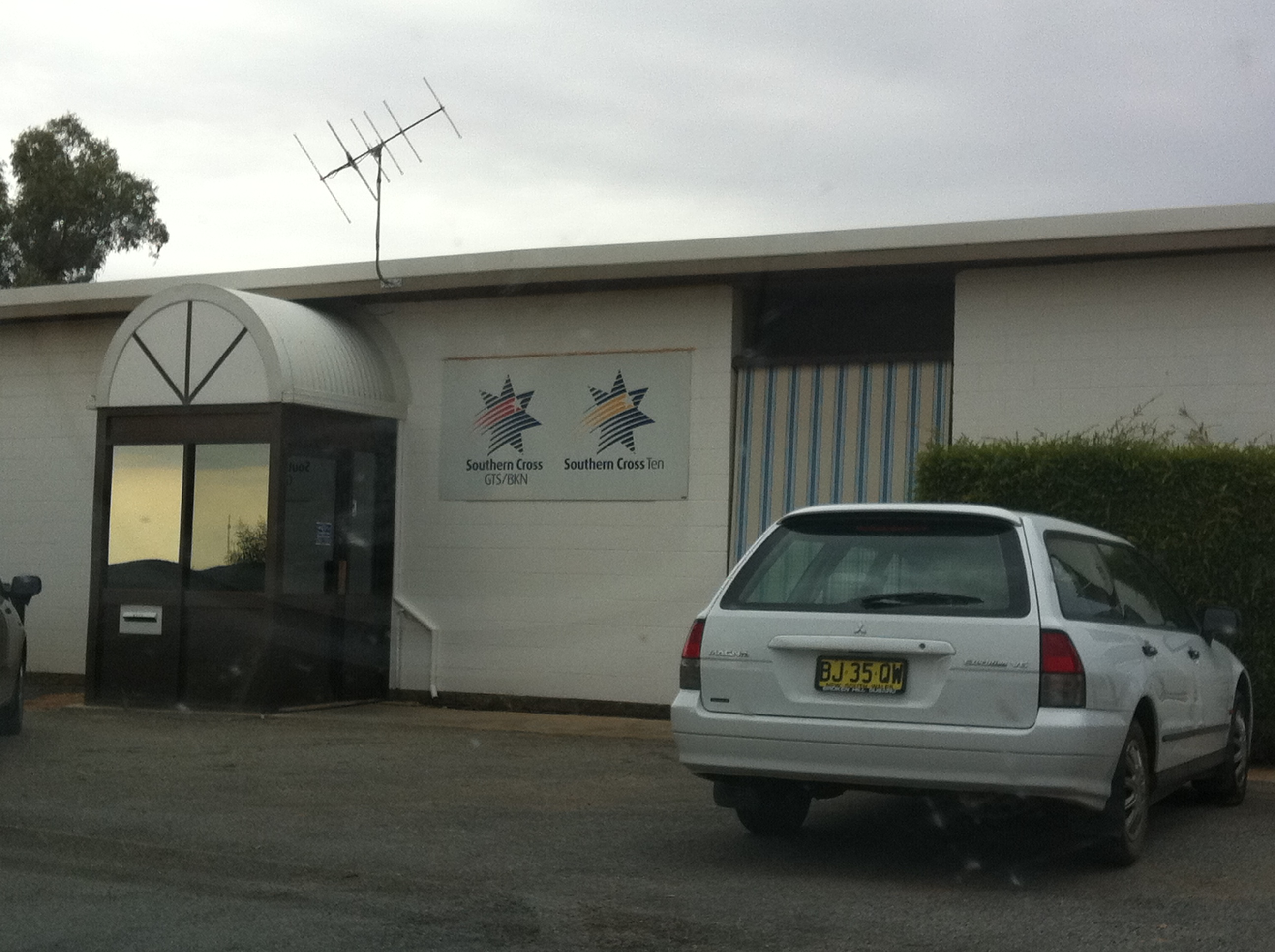
GTS/BKN offices in Broken Hill

GTS and BKN are Australian regional television stations serving the Spencer Gulf of South Australia and the Broken Hill area of New South Wales.

The stations are owned and operated by Seven Media Group and based in Port Pirie with satellite offices in Broken Hill, Port Augusta, Whyalla and Port Lincoln, and playout facilities based in Hobart.

The station's name originates from the Port Pirie and Broken Hill stations' callsigns, GTS Port Pirie and BKN Broken Hill.

== History ==
GTS signed on for the first time on 1 March 1968. BKN followed soon afterward, on 16 August. In 1974, the stations (and their repeaters) merged to form Spencer Gulf Telecasters and broadcast under the name GTS/BKN Television, and later, Central GTS/BKN. The company was bought by Southern Cross Broadcasting (SCB) in 2001, though it retained the Central name and branding until the end of 2005.

Due to their areas' sparse populations, after aggregation they remained among the few stations in Australia that continued to cherry-pick programming from all three networks, though from 2001 onward, it began favouring Seven through its affiliation with Southern Cross Television.

In 2003, Spencer Gulf Telecasters won the right to broadcast a second station in the same area, and in January 2004, started broadcasting SGS/SCN as a Ten affiliate. Since 31 October 2010, GTS/BKN has also operated a third station relaying Nine Network programming from Sydney and Adelaide, under the callsigns GDS in Port Pirie and BDN in Broken Hill.

In January 2006, Central GTS/BKN was renamed Southern Cross GTS/BKN, changing its logo to the corporate star branding used by TNT Tasmania and TND Darwin.

In July 2018, Southern Cross GTS/BKN was renamed Seven Spencer Gulf, reverting to the Seven Network branding, as currently used by Southern Cross stations in Tasmania and Darwin.

The sale of GTS/BKN, alongside its sister stations and the Seven-affiliated stations owned by Southern Cross Austereo, to Seven West Media was finalised in July 2025.

=== Digital channels ===
On 31 October 2010, GTS/BKN launched GDS/BDN, a Channel Nine affiliate rebroadcasting TCN Sydney. On 11 January 2011, GTS/BKN launched Ten's SD multichannel Eleven. Starting from 7 November 2011, GTS/BKN slowly rolled out 9Gem, 9Go!, 7two, 7mate and One as digital channels across the GTS/BKN areas.

On 7 December 2013, GDS/BDN switched to a feed of NWS Adelaide. On 30 September 2018, GDS/BDN launched 9Life.

Southern Cross Austereo launched 7HD, 9HD, and 10 HD in the Spencer Gulf/Broken Hill areas in March 2020, via the stations GTS/BKN, GDS/BDN, and SGS/SCN, while also making 7mate, 9Gem, and 10 Bold all SD channels to accommodate the aforementioned HD channels. The following are the changes that occurred on 19 March 2020: 7HD launched on LCN 60, 7mate moved from LCN 60 to LCN 63 and became a SD channel, and the main Seven channel was made available on both LCNs 6 and 61. 10 HD was launched on LCN 50. 10 Peach was moved from LCN 55 to LCN 53, 10 Bold was moved from LCN 50 to LCN 52 and became an SD channel, while the main 10 channel was made available on both LCNs 5 and 51. Southern Cross Austereo's Nine channel adjustments occurred in late March 2020; the following is a list of GDS/BDN channel changes that occurred in March 2020: 9HD was made available on LCN 80, the main Nine channel was made available on both LCNs 8 and 81, 9Go! was moved to LCN 83 from LCN 88, and 9Gem was moved to LCN 82 from LCN 80 and became a SD channel.

== Programming ==
The main GTS/BKN service carries programming from the Seven Network, including the Adelaide edition of Seven News' nightly 6pm bulletin.

GDS/BDN broadcasts programs from the Nine Network, including the state bulletin from NWS from Adelaide.

=== Local programming ===
GTS/BKN produced a wide range of local programming throughout the 1970s and 1980s, including Panel Probe, Women's World, Cue, sports coverage, local documentaries and a nightly epilogue. The station also produced its own local commercials.

=== News ===
For over 50 years, GTS/BKN ran a regional news service for its viewing area, initially as a 10-minute mid-evening bulletin before gradually expanding to a full half-hour program each weeknight.

The bulletin aired under numerous titles such as GTS/BKN News, Central News and Southern Cross News, before relaunching as Nightly News in January 2019.

The news service retained reporters and video journalists based at bureaus in Port Pirie, Broken Hill, Port Augusta, Port Lincoln and Whyalla, although in later years, presentation for the bulletin was moved from the Port Pirie studios to Southern Cross Austereo's Canberra headquarters, and latterly, the company's Hobart studio.

Presenters and reporters included Rosanna Mangiarelli, Will McDonald, Virginia Langeberg, Tim Hatfield, Fraser Goldsworthy, Julie Snook, and at the time of the bulletin's axing, Madeline Kerr and John Hunt, with weather presenter Alex Sykes.

In 2019, Nightly News was moved from GTS/BKN to sister station 7two, airing at 7pm on weeknights following the Adelaide-based edition of Seven News on the main channel.

On 13 April 2023, Southern Cross Austereo announced it was ceasing production of GTS/BKN's local news service, effective immediately, marking the end of local television programming for the Spencer Gulf and Broken Hill areas. According to other media outlets, some staff working on the program had not been informed that the final bulletin had been broadcast until after it aired.

GTS/BKN's Nightly News was the last regional TV news service to be produced in South Australia, following the end of WIN News' bulletins for the Mount Gambier and Riverland areas in February 2013.

=== Channels ===
The following is a list of channels broadcast on GTS and BKN respectively.

GTS/BKN:

LCN	Channel
6	Seven
60	7HD
61	Seven
62	7two
63	7mate
68	Racing.com

GDS/BDN:

LCN	Channel
8	Nine
80	9HD
81	Nine
82	9Gem
83	9Go!
84	9Life
