= Hook, Line and Sinker (TV program) =

- Created by: Andrew Hart; Nick Duigan
- Presented by: Andrew Hart; Nick Duigan (2001-2021)
- Country of origin: Australia
- Original language: English
- No. of seasons: 24
- No. of episodes: 300

Production
- Running time: 30 minutes
- Production company: HLS Productions

Original release
- Network: Seven Tasmania
- Release: 2001 – 2025
- Network: 7mate
- Release: 2012 – 2025

Hook, Line and Sinker was an Australian fishing television program, produced by HLS Productions in Hobart, Tasmania. It was hosted by Nick Duigan and Andrew Hart. The program premiered in 2001 and was broadcast nationally through the Southern Cross Seven and 7mate networks. 7mate has broadcast the program since 19 May 2012, with its eighth season. The program previously broadcast on the Southern Cross Ten channel before that channel switched affiliations to the Nine Network in 2016. The show aired on Saturday afternoons.

The show features some light entertainment and comical behaviour from the hosts as well as serious fishing news and stories from around Australia. The Canberra Times said it was "A River Somewhere meets Russell Coight". By 2012, it became "one of Tasmania's longest-running" television shows.

The University of Tasmania presents a regular segment on the show called "The Deep End". The segment features research and material from the Marine Research Laboratories at the Hobart campus and the National Centre for Marine Conservation & Resource Sustainability at the Launceston campus.

Host Nick Duigan left the program in 2021 following his endorsement by the Liberal Party to run for election in the Tasmanian Legislative Council.

After 24 seasons and 300 episodes, Hook, Line and Sinker aired its final episode in March 2025.

== Reception ==
In a positive review, The Observer's Rob Black Anges Water wrote, "Hook, Line and Sinker has become one of Australia's most popular fishing shows, with a bit of lifestyle and cooking mixed in with an irreverent blend of humour setting it apart from some of the more traditional programs." Phillip Ellerton of The Mercury said, "Although some purists may not enjoy the Hook, Line and Sinker DVDs, they offer a fresh, exciting and often humorous approach to fishing." Writing in The Mercury, Rohan Wade stated, "While not always madcap, the antics of Hart and Duigan are often more about good humour than good fishing, but it is a style that is winning over viewers as an alternative to the super-slick, highly produced interstate fishing shows that produce a steady stream of fish."
