= DTD (TV station) =

- Darwin, Northern Territory; Australia
- Channels: Digital: 33 (UHF); Virtual: 10
- Branding: 10 Darwin

Programming
- Language: English
- Affiliations: 10

Ownership
- Owner: Seven Media Group and Nine Entertainment; (Darwin Digital Television Pty Ltd)

History
- First air date: 28 April 2008
- Call sign meaning: Digital Television Darwin

Technical information
- Licensing authority: ACMA
- ERP: 85.5 kW
- HAAT: 147.0 m
- Transmitter coordinates: 12°24′52″S 130°58′9″E

Links
- Public licence information: Profile
- Website: www.10darwin.com.au

DTD is a digital television station in Darwin, Northern Territory. It is jointly owned by Nine Entertainment (owner of Nine Darwin) and Seven Media Group (owner of Seven Darwin) and operates under the company name Darwin Digital Television.

== History ==
The licence to operate Darwin's third commercial television station was allocated to Darwin Digital Television Pty Ltd, a joint venture with the two existing commercial television broadcasting licensees in the Darwin area, Regional Television Pty Ltd (TND – Southern Cross Darwin) and Territory Television Pty Ltd (NTD – Nine Darwin) in early 2007.

The channel was due to launch in late 2007 but was delayed until the channel started test transmitting a test pattern on 21 April 2008 at 6.00p.m. ACST The channel started transmitting television programs on 28 April 2008 as part of a testing period ahead of the official launch.

Since April 2008, the station also carries 10 News Melbourne bulletins from ATV-10, instead of the Brisbane and Sydney feeds, as well as a small amount of 10 Sport programming.

The station has carried a sole 10 affiliate, on relay from Melbourne instead of Brisbane or Sydney, despite time zone differences between Northern Territory and Victoria.

The sale of Southern Cross Austereo's Seven-affiliated stations, alongside its stake in DTD, to Seven West Media was finalised in July 2025.

== Programming ==
DTD rebroadcasts a direct feed of Brisbane's TVQ-10 instead of Sydney's TEN-10 or Melbourne's ATV-10 because of time zone differences between New South Wales/Victoria and the Northern Territory, especially during the summer months.

== Availability ==
The station is available only on digital television as an affiliate of Network 10. It broadcasts on UHF channel 33. Its signal was rebroadcast via Tasmanian Digital Television in Hobart until the latter became an affiliate of the Nine Network in July 2016.

== 10 Drama ==
On 22 April 2010, DTD began broadcasting "One", a sports-only high-definition channel, owned by Network Ten. Network Ten altered the channel's format to include documentaries, dramas and comedy aimed at male audiences between 4 pm and 10:30 pm, commencing from May 2011.

In October 2018, the channel rebranded from ONE to 10 Boss, and then quickly changed to 10 Bold to line up with the southern states.

== 10 Comedy ==
On 3 May 2011, DTD commenced transmission of "Eleven", a general entertainment channel aimed at "distinctly youthful" viewers between the ages of 13 and 29, with programs such as Neighbours and The Simpsons returning to Darwin Free-To-Air TV screens on the new channel.

In October 2018, the channel rebranded to 10 Peach to line up with the rest of the Network 10 stations. The channel simulcasts in standard definition.

== See also ==
- MDV (TV station)
- TDT (TV station)
- Seven Network
- Television broadcasting in Australia
