= Yesshop =

- Country: New Zealand
- Broadcast area: Australia & New Zealand

Programming
- Language: English
- Picture format: 576i (SDTV) 16:9

Ownership
- Owner: Yes Retail

History
- Launched: 4 November 2013
- Closed: 29 September 2016
- Replaced by: SonLife Broadcasting Network (for Southern Cross Austereo stations)

Availability

Terrestrial
- Freeview NZ (virtual): 21
- Freeview AU (virtual): 54/55/64/74

Yesshop (stylised as YESSHOP) was a New Zealand shopping channel. The channel was based on the South Korean model of home shopping.

The channel originally launched in New Zealand on free-to-air television and pay television on 4 November 2013. The channel announced on 12 November 2013, that creative student talent, from various schools in New Zealand, would feature on the channel on Sunday mornings, beginning on 17 November 2013. The channel expanded to Australian pay television provider Foxtel, launching on 29 February 2016, after signing a deal with them on 20 November of the previous year. The channel hit the streets of Auckland to sing for the charity KidsCan, on 4 May 2016. The channel also received a short-lived run on Australian regional free-to-air television via Southern Cross Austereo, launching on 1 August 2016.

Yesshop's owner, Yes Retail, made the decision to cease trading on 29 September 2016 citing lack of funds to pay wages and the company's current losses of approximately 20 million dollars. Employees' contracts were terminated the same day. Two young business owners were upset at the demise of Yesshop, because they would be left out of pocket after the collapse of the channel's owner. On Southern Cross Austereo's regional free-to-air television stations, on 17 July 2017, a channel owned by evangelist Jimmy Swaggart, SonLife Broadcasting Network, launched using this channel's old spectrum.
