= SGS/SCN =

Australian TV station in Spencer Gulf/Broken Hill affiliated with Network 10

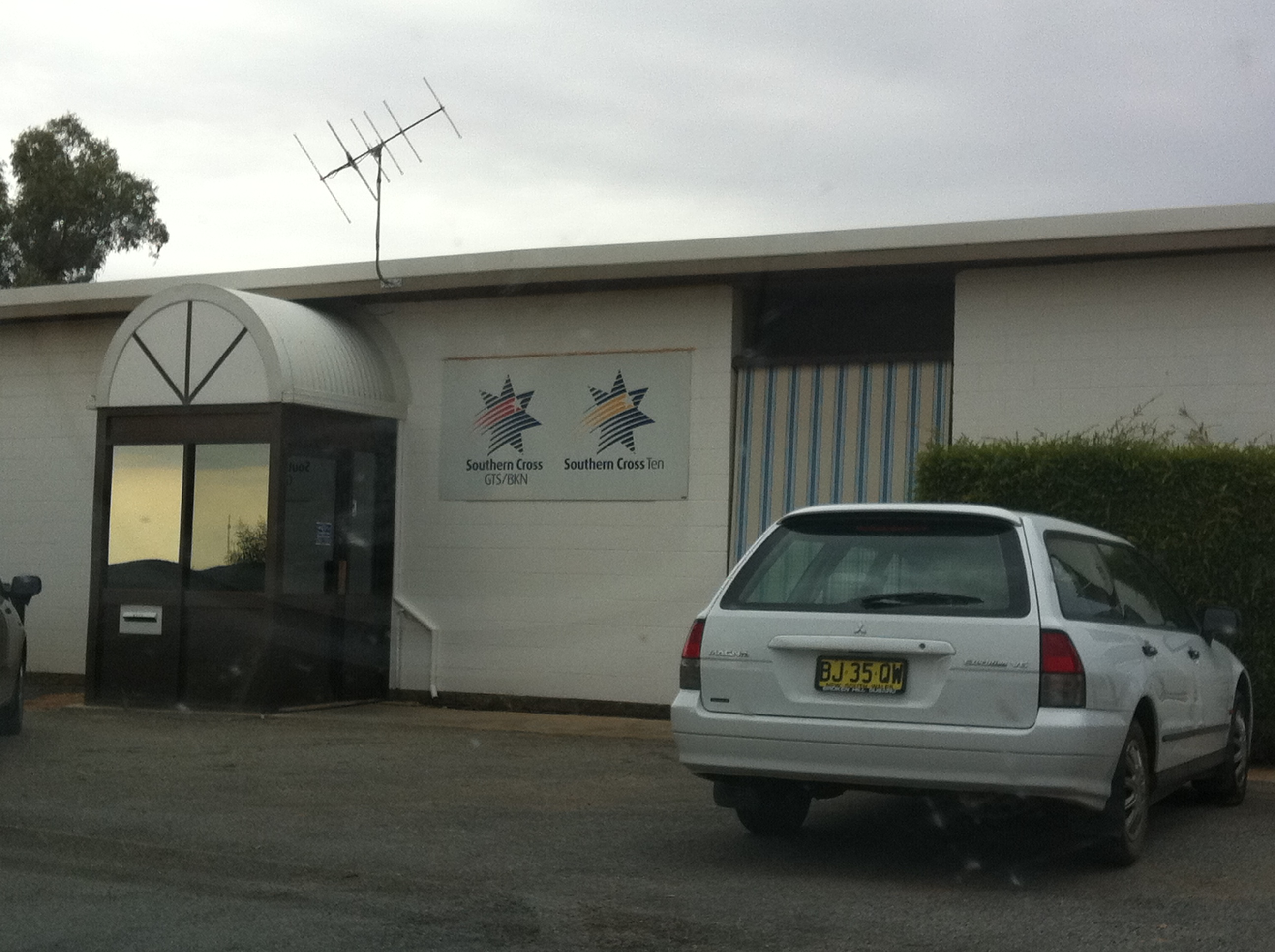
- The Broken Hill studios of GTS/BKN and SGS/SCN
- SGS: Spencer Gulf, South Australia SCN: Broken Hill, New South Wales; Australia
- Channels: Digital: SGS: 40 (UHF) SCN: 6 (VHF)
- Branding: 10 Spencer Gulf; 10 Broken Hill

Programming
- Language: English
- Affiliations: SGS/SCN: 10

Ownership
- Owner: Seven Media Group; (SGS: Spencer Gulf Telecasters Pty Ltd) (SCN: Broken Hill Television Pty Ltd)
- Sister stations: GTS/BKN

History
- First air date: SGS/SCN: January 2004
- Former channel numbers: Analog: SGS: 42 (UHF); SCN: 9A (VHF)
- Call sign meaning: SGS: Spencer; Gulf; South Australia; SCN: Southern; Cross; New South Wales

Technical information
- Licensing authority: Australian Communications & Media Authority

SGS and SCN are Australian regional television stations serving the Spencer Gulf of South Australia and the Broken Hill area of New South Wales, owned by Seven Media Group. The station is based in Port Pirie with satellite offices in Broken Hill, Port Augusta, Whyalla and Port Lincoln, and studio and playout facilities based in Canberra.

Prior to 2004, GTS/BKN were the only regional commercial stations servicing the Spencer Gulf and Broken Hill areas. They broadcast a selection of content, 'cherry-picked' from the three metropolitan networks Seven, Nine and Ten. GTS/BKN remained among the few stations that continued to 'cherry-pick' content following aggregation in the 1980s, though after 2000 it began to favour content from Seven due to its ownership by Seven affiliate Southern Cross Austereo. In 2003, Spencer Gulf Telecasters won the right to broadcast a second station in the same licence area, and in January 2004, SGS/SCN were launched as a 10-affiliated station, branded as 10.

On 11 January 2011, SGS/SCN launched 10's SD multichannel Eleven, which was rebranded as 10 Peach in 2018 and rebranded again as 10 Peach Comedy in 2024.

The sale of SGS/SCN, alongside its sister stations and the Seven-affiliated stations owned by Southern Cross Austereo, to Seven West Media (now owned by Seven Media Group) was finalised in July 2025.

== Programming ==
SGS/SCN, as part of 10, is the area's Network 10 partner network with the national programming from TEN Sydney and the local 10 News broadcast from ADS Adelaide being aired.

=== Channels ===
LCN	Channel
5	10
50	10 HD
51	10
52	10 Drama
53	10 Comedy
54	SBN

== See also ==
- Seven Network
