= TNT (Australian TV station) =

Television station in Tasmania, Australia

- Tasmania; Australia
- Channels: Virtual: 6
- Branding: Seven

Programming
- Language: English
- Affiliations: Seven (O&O)

Ownership
- Owner: Seven Media Group
- Sister stations: 7two 7mate Racing.com

History
- Founded: 1962
- First air date: 26 May 1962
- Former channel number: Analog: 9 (VHF) (1962–2013)
- Former affiliations: Independent (1962–1994); TasTV (1985–1989); Southern Cross Network (1989–1994); Network Ten (1994–2008)
- Call sign meaning: Television; Northern; Tasmania

Technical information
- Licensing authority: Australian Communications and Media Authority
- ERP: see table below
- HAAT: see table below
- Transmitter coordinates: see table below

TNT is an Australian TV station based in Hobart, Tasmania, now owned by Seven Media Group. Originally based in Launceston and broadcasting to northern Tasmania – its call sign "TNT" was an acronym for Television Northern Tasmania – it has broadcast statewide since aggregation of the Tasmanian television market in 1994, and is currently affiliated with the Australian Seven Network.

== Corporate history ==
TNT was founded as Northern TV Ltd and commenced broadcasting in Launceston and Northern Tasmania on 26 May 1962 as TNT-9. In 1965, TNT-9 became a part of ENT Ltd (Examiner-Northern TV Ltd), and after ENT bought TVT-6 in Hobart in 1982, TNT-9 and TVT-6 were relaunched in 1985 under the joint "TasTV" brand, while still retaining their original call signs.

Later, under aggregation laws, ENT was required to divest one of its two stations by 1992. And so on 30 March 1988, ENT sold TNT-9 for $40 million to Tricom Corporation, then the second largest regional television broadcaster in Australia. Tricom was later rebranded as Southern Cross Broadcasting, and from 1 January 1989 TNT-9 became known on-air as part of the Southern Cross Network. Ahead of this separation of its two stations, TNT opened relay station TNT-8 on King Island on 9 September 1988.

Following federal aggregation in 1994, Southern Cross Television began broadcasting in Hobart, while TasTV (later to become WIN Television) commenced transmission in Launceston. Both networks subsequently operated statewide, competing against each other directly, with TNT-9 becoming a combined Seven Network and Network 10 affiliate. However, on 23 December 2003 Southern Cross Media Group and WIN Television jointly launched Tasmanian Digital Television (TDT), a digital-only station based in Hobart that relayed Network 10 content. This resulted in TNT-9 gradually removing Network 10 content from its schedule in the late 2000s.

In February 2025, TNT-9's owners Southern Cross Media Group (through Southern Cross Austero) announced the sale of its remaining television assets – including TNT-9 – to the media company Australian Digital Holdings (ADH). However, the deal collapsed in May 2025, leading to Seven West Media announcing it would instead acquire the station from Southern Cross Austereo for $3.75 million, with the sale finalised on 1 July 2025. TNT-9 continued as TNT-7 under Seven West Media ownership until that company merged with Southern Cross Media Group in January 2026.

TNT-7 is now owned and operated by the Seven Network and also broadcasts most of that network's sub-channels, including 7two, 7mate, SBN, and Racing.com. Rival WIN Television station TVT-6 is affiliated with the national metropolitan Nine Network, and the two jointly own TDT — which is affiliated with the national metropolitan Network 10.

== Logos ==
TNT-9 has revised its on-air logo a number of times since it commenced broadcasting in 1962.

By 1980, TNT-9 had adopted a customised version of the Nine Network's "Nine Dots" logo, with the dots replaced by stars. Then in 1999, Southern Cross Tasmania, still part of Southern Cross Broadcasting, introduced its own logo independent of its mainland affiliates, featuring a stylised Tasmanian tiger. This lasted until 17 July 2005, when Southern Cross Broadcasting adopted a uniform corporate logo across all its stations, requiring Southern Cross Tasmania to retire its Tasmanian tiger branding.

In June 2018 Southern Cross Tasmania was rebranded as 7 Tasmania, with its local branding – and hence that of TNT – replaced by that of the Seven Network.

== Local programming ==
=== News and current affairs programmes ===
The station's flagship news program is Seven News Tasmania (formerly called Nightly News and Southern Cross News), which is broadcast live each night at 6:00 pm from the Southern Cross Austereo studios in Hobart and is consistently the market's highest-rating daily news bulletin. Short news updates are also produced and broadcast throughout the day. From 2017 to 2025, a shortened version of the day's bulletin featuring only local news, sport reports, and weather forecasts was uploaded to the station's YouTube channel. Since August 2025, after the Seven Network's acquisition of the station, on demand news editions are now exclusively available via the network's streaming service 7plus.

In 2018, coinciding with its adoption of Seven Network graphics and identity, the station had planned to retitle the news bulletin Seven News Tasmania. However, the relaunch was postponed without notice. When questioned by ABC's Media Watch, Southern Cross Austereo (SCA) CEO Grant Blackley stated that the Seven Network did not want its brand used on output it did not directly control, and that SCA was developing an alternative identity. On 3 December 2018 the bulletin changed its title to Nightly News, a brand the station had formerly used from the 1990s until the early 2000s. On 6 October 2025, following the Seven Network's acquisition of the station, the bulletin was finally rebranded as Seven News Tasmania.

From 1962 until 24 May 2026, TNT's news program was produced in Launceston. But on 25 May 2026 Seven News Tasmania bulletins were relocated from temporary premises in Charles Street, Launceston to studios in Hobart with transmission handled by Seven Network’s Canberra studios, thereby ending six decades of the program being produced in Launceston. With the move to Hobart, anchor Kim Millar now presents the programme from Monday to Wednesday, with Michael Maney presenting from Thursday to Sunday. Triple M Hobart breakfast presenter Andy Taylor has been confirmed as the new weekday sports presenter, with Kiah Wicks and Rick Marton continuing to present the weather. Seven News Tasmania was also home to Australia’s longest serving commercial weather presenter, Peter “Murph” Murphy, who appeared on air for 41 years from 1984–2025.

==== Current news presenters ====
Role	Bulletins						
Role	Monday	Tuesday	Wednesday	Thursday	Friday	Saturday	Sunday
News	Kim Millar (2020–present)			Michael Maney (2025–present)			
Sport	Andy “Tubes” Taylor (2026–present)						
Weather	Kiah Wicks (2025–present)					Rick Marton (2025–present)	

==== Fill in presenters ====
- Rachel Williams (News)
- Louise Houbaer (News)
- Lily Thomson (News & Sport)
- Jackie Harvey (Weather)
- Ruby Cairns (Weather)
- Daniel Gibson (Weather)

In addition to its local bulletin, TNT-7 broadcasts national news and current affairs programming from the Seven Network, including:

- Sunrise
- Weekend Sunrise
- The Morning Show
- Seven News bulletins, including Sunrise Early News, National News, Afternoon News at 4, and Weekend Afternoon News at 5.

The station also simulcasts the weekday edition of Seven News at 4 from HSV-7 in Melbourne, as well as Seven’s National News at Noon on weekdays and Seven News at 5 on weekends from ATN-7 in Sydney.

=== Non-news programmes ===
Local programmes produced previously by TNT-9 over the years include Sports Club (weekly sports review), Quiz Quest (children's game show), The Saturday Night Show (variety), Down the Line (morning talk/local events), The Saturday Morning Fun Show (kids), and Tasmanian New Faces (talent).

More recent programmes include:

The fishing show Hook, Line and Sinker was hosted by former news journalists Andrew Hart and Nick Duigan and was the most popular Tasmanian-made non-news program, broadcast Australia-wide and running for 300 episodes and 24 seasons between 2000 and 2025. Following the airing of the last episode in 2025, the programme has continued its social media presence with regular updates on its YouTube Channel.

Renovation Relief was a DIY programme hosted by famous wood-chopper David Foster in which he and a team of people from commercial sponsors renovated a house, most commonly for people who have done something for the community or have enabled children in some way.

Targa Torque was broadcast nightly following the car rally Targa Tasmania over its fortnight, with Andrew Hart and Nick Duigan reporting and reviewing the events of the day.

Holiday at Home was a lifestyle program which promoted places to stay and things to do in Tasmania.

For the ten weeks leading up to the Burnie Ten, Mark Connelly trained a group of people in a programme sponsored by Seven Tasmania (then Southern Cross Television), with weekly updates broadcast during commercial breaks. In the early years of the program, the participants were people who were well known in Tasmania, but in 2006 a Launceston family were trained to run the event.

=== Sports coverage ===
The present-day TNT-7 airs sports coverage from the Seven Network, which includes Australian Rules Football, horse racing, cricket, tennis, golf and motorsport. In the 1990s, the station aired Network 10's daily sports program Sports Tonight as part of its dual affiliation. However, this was eventually replaced by the Seven Network's current affairs program Today Tonight. The station airs three AFL games per round courtesy of its affiliation with the Seven Network.

Locally, the station promotes extensive coverage of Tasmanian sports including cricket, athletics, netball and basketball. Coverage of the international road race Targa Tasmania is produced and aired each year, and the station also produces live coverage of the Launceston and Hobart Cups. Regular updates on the annual Sydney to Hobart Yacht Race are broadcast for the duration of the race.

The station's previous sports reporters include Nick Kelly, Tom Johnson, Chris Rowbottom, Alicia Muling, Trent Dann, Rob Fairs, and Nick Duigan.

== Channels ==
Channels currently aired by TNT across Tasmania
Channel Name	LCN	Content Type
Channel 7	6, 60, 61 (HD)	General entertainment • Australian • Sport • Reality
7two	62	Adult programming • General entertainment
7mate	63	Men's programming • Sport
SBN International	64	Religious programming
TVSN	65	Home shopping
you.tv	66	Home shopping
gecko	67	Home shopping
Racing.com	68	Racing

Other Seven Network sister channels such as 7flix and 7Bravo are not broadcast in Tasmania, but are available via the network's streaming service 7plus and Foxtel.

== Main transmitters ==
Region served	City	Channels (Analog/ Digital)	First air date	ERP (Analog/ Digital)	HAAT (Analog/ Digital)^{1}	Transmitter Coordinates	Transmitter Location
Hobart	Hobart	31 (UHF); 10 (VHF)	30 April 1994	1300 kW; 50 kW	1061 m 1030 m	42°53′51″S 147°14′10″E (analog); 42°53′42″S 147°14′10″E (digital)	Mount Wellington
North Eastern Tasmania	Launceston	9 (VHF); 45 (UHF)	26 May 1962	300 kW; 600 kW	809 m 839 m	41°23′27″S 147°25′29″E (analog); 41°23′27″S 147°25′28″E (digital)	Mount Barrow

Notes:

- 1. HAAT estimated from https://www.itu.int/SRTM3/ using EHAAT.

== See also ==
- Seven Network
