= QQQ =

Television station in Queensland

QQQ and ITQ

QQQ: Remote Central and Eastern Australia; ITQ: Mount Isa, Queensland; Australia
- Channels for ITQ: Digital: 37 (UHF)
- Branding: Seven Central

Programming
- Network: Seven

Ownership
- Owner: Seven Media Group; (Regional Television Pty Ltd)

History
- First air date: QQQ: 24 April 1988; ITQ: 11 September 1971
- Former channel number: ITQ: Analog: 8 (VHF)
- Former affiliations: ITQ: Independent (1971–1998)
- Call sign meaning: QQQ: Three Qs, the last for Queensland; ITQ: Mount Isa Telecasters, Queensland

Technical information
- Licensing authority: ACMA
- ERP: ITQ: 1.3 kW
- HAAT: ITQ: 75 m
- Transmitter coordinates: ITQ: 20°44′4″S 139°30′45″E

Links
- Public licence information: Profile

QQQ is an Australian television station broadcasting in remote central and eastern areas of Australia, owned by Seven Media Group. The station is available via satellite and terrestrial platforms, mostly through community retransmission sites, although it also transmits into the town of Mount Isa, Queensland, under the call sign ITQ.

== History ==
ITQ Channel 8 began broadcasting into Mount Isa on 11 September 1971, converting to colour in May 1975. QQQ began broadcasting into remote Queensland and New South Wales in 1988. In 1990, ITQ was purchased by North Queensland Television, who owned QQQ at the time, and became a relay of QQQ.

In December 1998, the ITQ and QQQ signals – then known as Queensland Satellite Television, or QSTV, and owned by Telecasters Australia Limited (previously Telecasters North Queensland) – were officially aggregated with that of Imparja Television into a Remote Central and Eastern Australia licence area. Previously, QSTV serviced western parts of Queensland and New South Wales, while Imparja serviced the Northern Territory (excluding Darwin), and remote South Australia and Victoria, plus far-western New South Wales (excluding Broken Hill). As part of the aggregation, the Australian Broadcasting Authority further extended the combined licence area to cover more remote areas of New South Wales, Victoria and Tasmania, who were not fully served by regularly licensed terrestrial television services.

On 1 February 1999, QSTV changed its affiliation from predominantly Network Ten, in line with Telecasters' stations in regional Queensland (TNQ, now 10 Regional Queensland), to the Seven Network, becoming Seven Central. This closely followed the introduction of a Seven Network-affiliated service, Seven Darwin (TND), to Darwin in 1998.

Telecasters Australia was purchased by Southern Cross Broadcasting (SCB) in July 2001, and its official name was eventually changed to Southern Cross Central. However, unlike other Southern Cross-owned stations – including TND, which at the time was a dual Seven/Ten affiliate under the Southern Cross Television brand – QQQ/ITQ simply carried the Seven Network branding unchanged, leading some people to continue to refer it as "Seven Central". The station carried a simple "SCTV" text watermark in lieu of independent branding, denoting the origin of the signal. (Previously, the watermark has read "TAL" and "SCB", denoting the previous owners. "MSCM" was used briefly after the Macquarie acquisition.)

On 19 May 2010, the Australian Communications and Media Authority (ACMA) approved a licence for Central Digital Television, a third digital-only network to be jointly owned by Imparja Television and Southern Cross Austereo. The network launched on 30 June 2010 on the Viewer Access Satellite Television service. The same day, Southern Cross Central began broadcasting SCTV Central, SCTV Central HD and 7Two Central to coincide with the first analog television transmitter switch off in Mildura, Victoria. This was so viewers in the area who lost adequate television coverage were able to utilise VAST as an alternative source.

VAST officially launched on 10 December 2010, and began granting access to viewers in the Remote Central and Eastern Australia licence areas. This brought digital television to satellite viewers in the Northern Territory, Queensland and South Australia for the first time. Digital terrestrial transmissions began in Alice Springs, Northern Territory and Mount Isa, Queensland on 2 May 2011, with other areas launching between 2012 and 2013. Optus Aurora, the satellite service preceding VAST, was closed down on 10 December 2013.

The sale of Southern Cross Austereo's Seven-affiliated stations to Seven West Media was finalised in July 2025.

== News updates ==
Under previous owners, a local Seven News bulletin for Darwin and Central Australia was produced until 2000. Separate news update services for remote Australia were introduced in 2005 before being merged with updates for Darwin into one service in 2013. The shared three-minute short news updates throughout the day are broadcast on ITQ/QQQ serving remote areas and TND in Darwin, presented from studios in Launceston.

== Availability ==
=== Terrestrial ===
Seven Central broadcasts free-to-air digital television channels Seven Central, 7mate Central and 7two Central via terrestrial transmissions in many regional cities and towns. The network is licensed to broadcast within the Remote Central and Eastern Australia TV2 and Mount Isa TV1 licence areas, which include Alice Springs, Bourke, Ceduna, Charleville, Coober Pedy, Cooktown, Katherine, Longreach, Mount Isa, Roma and Weipa, as well as others.

=== Satellite ===
A digital satellite transmission of Seven Central's channels is available free-to-view on the VAST service in all states and territories of Australia, except Western Australia. 7mate Central is broadcast as a single channel to all viewers, while Seven Central and 7two Central are each split into two separate channels. Seven Central North and 7two Central North are broadcast in Australian Eastern Standard Time for viewers in Northern Territory and Queensland (Northern Australia TV3 licence area), and Seven Central South and 7two Central South in Australian Eastern Summer Time for viewers in New South Wales, Victoria, South Australia, Tasmania and Norfolk Island (South Eastern Australia TV3 licence area).

Seven Central North and Seven Central South are broadcast in high definition.

Seven Central is also available in Port Moresby in Papua New Guinea though Digicel Pacific (shown on channel list as 7 Central).

== See also ==
- Seven
