= ADH TV =

- Type: Opinion; News and current affairs; Politics
- Country: Australia
- Broadcast area: Australia
- Headquarters: Chippendale, New South Wales

Programming
- Language: English

Ownership
- Owner: Australian Digital Holdings
- Key people: Alan Jones (host); Jack Bulfin (CEO and founder); Maurice Newman (chairman)

History
- Founded: 25 November 2021; 4 years ago

Links
- Website: adh.tv

ADH TV (Australian Digital Holdings) is a streaming news channel based in the Sydney suburb of Chippendale. The channel features libertarian and conservative presenters and airs live content for five hours every weekday. The channel's chief executive officer and chairman are Jack Bulfin and businessman Maurice Newman respectively.

== History ==
ADH TV was launched in 2021 by Jack Bulfin and two friends including Jake Thrupp after the channel's parent company Australian Digital Holdings was registered with the Australian Securities & Investments Commission on 25 November 2021. Alan Jones was announced as its first host on 10 December, having left Sky News Australia in November. His show − Alan Jones: Direct to the People − aired its first episode on 13 December.

The channel relocated to purpose-built studios in Chippendale on 2 May 2022 and came at the same time as Jones returning to the channel for a show with his name.

In July 2023, James Packer invested in ADH TV, although the total amount of the investment is unknown.

In November 2024, ADH offered to buy the 93 free-to-air television stations owned by Southern Cross Austereo (SCA). On 27 February 2025, it was announced that ADH TV had purchased around a dozen television licences from SCA. These included Seven Network and Network 10 regional affiliates in Tasmania, Darwin, Spencer Gulf, Broken Hill, Mt Isa, and Remote Central and Eastern Australia, and Nine Network regional affiliates in Spencer Gulf and Broken Hill. It was announced in May 2025 that the deal with SCA had fallen through, and the channels were acquired by Seven West Media.

In December 2024, it was announced that ADH TV would become a local version of Newsmax in 2025.

== Presenters ==
=== Current ===
- David Flint
- Lyle Shelton
- Nick Cater
- Chris Smith

=== Former ===
- Fred Pawle (2022−2024)
- Damian Coory (2024−2024)
- Alan Jones (on hiatus)
