= TNQ =

- Regional Queensland; Australia
- Channels: Digital: see table below
- Branding: 10

Programming
- Language: English
- Network: 10

Ownership
- Owner: Paramount Networks UK & Australia (Ten Network Holdings); (Regional Television Pty Ltd)

History
- First air date: 1 November 1962
- Former affiliations: Independent (1 November 1962 – 31 December 1990); Nine Network (1990, 1 July 2016 – 30 June 2021); Network Ten (31 December 1990 – 30 June 2016)
- Call sign meaning: Telecasters North Queensland

Technical information
- Licensing authority: Australian Communications and Media Authority

Links
- Public licence information: Profile
- For technical information, see § Main Transmitters.

TNQ is an Australian television station, licensed to, and serving the regional areas of Queensland. The station is owned and operated by Network 10.

== History ==
Network 10 in Regional Queensland began in 1978 as North Queensland Television, a partnership between two regional stations:

- TNQ-7 Townsville (launched on 1 November 1962)
- FNQ-10 Cairns (launched on 7 September 1966)

In 1984 NQTV adopted a localised version of NBC's Just Watch Us Now theme and slogan, which had also been used by various metropolitan Seven Network stations the previous year. The station's The Place to Be slogan was used from the mid-1980s until 1993.

When aggregation was announced in the late 1980s, NQTV was planning to be the Nine Network affiliate for regional Queensland. NQTV had a write-in competition for their name and logo. The name QTV was chosen and because of the intended Nine affiliation, it adopted a logo with the Nine dots (similar to WIN and NBN's logos). Unfavourable viewer response forced the station to change logos within a few months. The station ran with a Nine-based identification package in the year leading up to aggregation.

However, the station faced a crisis in the days leading up to aggregation when WIN Television bought the Toowoomba and Rockhampton-based Star Television, and switched the affiliation from Ten to Nine, in line with WIN's NSW station. This meant that QTV had to change its logo and affiliation in a hurry. QTV picked up the vacant Ten affiliation, instead. The station originally broadcast a licence-wide one-hour news bulletin when Queensland was aggregated, but this was soon axed outside the North Queensland television market.

The station's owners, Telecasters North Queensland (later Telecasters Australia), joined the Ten Group Consortium in 1992–1993. This led to a change from QTV to Ten Queensland, and they began to use generic Ten branding.

In 2001, Telecasters was purchased by Southern Cross. In that same year, Ten Local News in North Queensland was axed (along with Ten Capital News in Canberra) and replaced with Ten News Brisbane – one of the many decisions which led to the local news inquiry by the ABA. In 2002, like the other Southern Cross-owned Ten affiliates, the station was rebranded to Southern Cross Ten.

On 1 July 2016, Southern Cross switched its primary affiliation from Network Ten to the Nine Network, TNQ's supposed affiliate for the region prior to aggregation. The Southern Cross Ten branding was retired and replaced by generic Nine branding.

On 1 July 2021, Southern Cross again switched its primary affiliation from the Nine Network to Network 10. The Nine branding was retired and replaced by generic 10 branding.

On 17 December 2024, Southern Cross Austereo announced they are selling their regional television licenses in Regional Queensland, Southern NSW/ACT and Regional Victoria over to their affiliate Network 10. The sale was completed on 1 March 2025.

== News & Current Affairs ==
Judi Hogan hosting State Focus, a current affairs program broadcast in Queensland by TNQ.

From the 1970s to late 1990s, the station maintained regional news coverage through its 5:30pm half-hour local news bulletin and, later, its 6pm one-hour news bulletin. In addition from the late 1970s the station produced its own 30-minute, weekly current affairs program Newsweek and State Focus, the first live TV debate of its kind in North Queensland. Both programs were founded and produced by the NQTV news director, Rick Anderton, in Townsville. Newsweek aired weekly for more than 10 years and became one of Australia's longest running current affairs shows of its time, winning over 16 national Thorn EMI awards for its contribution to current affairs journalism in Australia.

In the lead-up to aggregation, with NQTV (which soon after became QTV) gearing up to become the Nine Network affiliate, the look and feel of the news was changed to match that of National Nine News and became known as QTV News in 1990. However, this was short lived, as the station was instead left with Network Ten affiliation due to WIN Television purchasing a rival station which, in turn, took the Nine Network affiliation for the region. The look and feel of QTV News was subsequently changed to reflect that of Ten Eyewitness News and its name changed to QTV Eyewitness News.

When Queensland was first aggregated, QTV broadcast a licence-wide one hour bulletin but this was scaled back to north Queensland due to low ratings.

In 1993, the news service became Ten North Queensland News after the station was rebranded as Ten Queensland.

In January 2000, Ten Queensland revamped its news format in response to viewer demand for more local news. The 6pm news bulletin was reduced to 30 minutes and became a solely regional news bulletin with the introduction of Ten News Brisbane into North Queensland, and changed its name to Ten Local News to reflect the new format.

In November 2001, Ten Local News in North Queensland was axed by new owners Southern Cross Broadcasting due to cost-cutting measures along with Ten Capital News in Canberra.

As the then Southern Cross Ten, TNQ also previously produced its own public affairs programme, State Focus, tackling issues across the state.

Local news was reintroduced to the station in 2004 in the form of three-minute updates at various times of the day. The updates were produced by Southern Cross Austereo and were branded as Southern Cross Ten Local News until the change of network affiliation to Nine in July 2016, when they were rebranded as "Local News Headlines".

TNQ previously broadcast Nine News editions from Sydney and Brisbane (national and state) as well as A Current Affair and 60 Minutes. TNQ served as the Nine News regional broadcaster to regional Queensland viewers, with the state level news provided by QTQ-9 in Brisbane. In addition, TNQ served, from 2017 to 2020, as co-producer of the Brisbane-based weekday editions of Nine News Darwin that are aired within the Northern Territory, until NTD resumed production.

The first of the new Nine News regional editions produced from Brisbane premiered for the Sunshine Coast viewers on 21 August 2017.

== Main Transmitters ==
Region served	City	Channels (Analog/ Digital)	First air date	ERP (Analog/ Digital)	HAAT (Analog/ Digital)^{1}	Transmitter Coordinates	Transmitter Location
Cairns, Innisfail and Mourilyan plus surrounding areas ^{2}	Cairns	10 (VHF)^{3} 6 (VHF)	7 September 1966	200 kW; 50 kW	1177 m 1190 m	17°15′51″S 145°51′14″E	Mount Bellenden Ker
Darling Downs	Toowoomba	41 (UHF)^{3} 40 (UHF)	31 December 1990	1300 kW; 500 kW	515 m 520 m	26°53′28″S 151°36′18″E (analog); 26°53′27″S 151°36′21″E (digital)	Mount Mowbullan
Mackay	Mackay	33 (UHF)^{3} 32 (UHF)	31 December 1990	1300 kW; 360 kW	612 m 630 m	21°1′56″S 148°56′36″E	Mount Blackwood
Rockhampton	Rockhampton	34 (UHF)^{3} 36 (UHF)	31 December 1990	2000 kW; 500 kW	523 m 523 m	23°43′48″S 150°32′9″E	Mount Hopeful
Southern Downs	Warwick	39 (UHF)^{3} 52 (UHF)	31 December 1990	600 kW; 500 kW	301 m 301 m	28°32′9″S 151°49′58″E	Passchendaele
Townsville	Townsville	7 (VHF)^{3} 36 (UHF)	1 November 1962	200 kW; 200 kW	612 m 655 m	19°20′34″S 146°46′56″E (analog); 19°20′36″S 146°46′50″E (digital)	Mount Stuart
Wide Bay	Maryborough	33 (UHF)^{3} 9 (VHF)	31 December 1990	1000 kW; 60 kW	646 m 646 m	25°25′37″S 152°7′3″E	Mount Goonaneman

Notes:

- 1. HAAT estimated from https://www.itu.int/SRTM3/ using EHAAT.
- 2. The Cairns station was an independent station with the callsign FNQ from its 1966 sign-on until aggregation in 1990.
- 3. Analogue transmissions ceased on 6 December 2011 as part of the national shutdown of analogue television.

== See also ==
- Television broadcasting in Australia
