= GLV/BCV =

- Regional Victoria; Australia
- Channels: Digital: see table below; Virtual: 5
- Branding: 10

Programming
- Language: English
- Affiliations: 10 (O&O)

Ownership
- Owner: Paramount Networks UK & Australia

History
- First air date: GLV: 9 December 1961; BCV: 23 December 1961
- Former channel number: Analog: see table below
- Former affiliations: Independent (9 December 1961 – 31 December 1991, GLV part-time relay of GTV-9 from 1961–1970s); Ten (1 January 1992 – 30 June 2016); Seven (January – February 1992) (Note: For transmissions of the 1992 Australian Open and the 1992 Australian Masters as Prime Television had not yet begun transmissions outside Albury.); Nine (1 July 2016 – 30 June 2021)
- Call sign meaning: GLV: Gippsland Latrobe Valley/Victoria; BCV: Bendigo Central Victoria

Technical information
- Licensing authority: Australian Communications & Media Authority
- ERP: see table below
- HAAT: see table below
- Transmitter coordinates: see table below

GLV and BCV are Australian television stations licensed to serve Traralgon, Bendigo and the region of Victoria. The stations are owned and operated by Network 10.

== History ==
=== Early years ===
GLV-10 in Traralgon was the first regional television station to launch in Australia on 9 December 1961, originally covering the Gippsland and Latrobe Valley areas. It was also the first station to completely use Australian-made broadcasting equipment from AWA. The original transmission equipment consisted of a 10 kW and 2 kW transmitter (standby) which was based on the RCA product and adapted to 230 V 50 Hz by AWA. The Melbourne pickup was a Rhode and Schwarz off-air receiver with AWA return microwave links to the studio. BCV-8 first went to air two weeks later, on 23 December 1961(the same day as the launch of GMV-6 Shepparton), serving Bendigo and Central Victoria.

On 25 March 1970, BCV-8 was off the air for 45 minutes. The incident was caused by two mice who got into the transmitter's high-voltage cables, short circuiting the main circuit and the switchboard.

=== Affiliations ===
GLV pioneered the use of live, "off-air" relays of television programs from stations in Melbourne, including GTV-9's hugely popular In Melbourne Tonight. Since the station had no video recording equipment, engineers needed to rely on picking up the original signal at the transmitter site to relay back to the studio. As the sole commercial television station in the region, GLV's program lineup included local output such as news and children's programs, combined with programs selected from Melbourne's commercial stations – the Nine Network, Seven Network (HSV-7), and from 1964, Network 10 (ATV-0).

An affiliation formed between the two stations and STV-8 Mildura in the 1970s as the Victorian Broadcasting Network, adopting the name of a former statewide radio network and later as Television Centre of Victoria. In 1982, the three stations merged as the Southern Cross TV8 television network, sharing a common stylised flag logo and programming schedule. Seven years later it was renamed the Southern Cross Network. STV-8 split from the network in 1990 when the station joined the then-Television Victoria network, as Mildura was not included in the Victorian aggregation plan.

=== From GLV-10 to GLV-8 ===
On 17 January 1980, GLV-10 changed frequencies from VHF channel 10 to 8 to allow neighbouring Melbourne television station ATV-0 to move to the original frequency three days later to eliminate interference problems on VHF-0. Channels 8 and 10 became Channel 8 as a result of the switch.

A Southern Cross Ten regional sales office in Echuca

=== Aggregation ===
When aggregation in regional Victoria took place between 1992 and 1993, the Southern Cross Network expanded to Shepparton, Ballarat and Albury as an affiliate of Network 10. By September 1993, the network had changed its name and logo to SCN TV, and then again in May 1994 to Ten Victoria. The latter change coincided with the cancellation of the station's local news service SCN News at Six, the last installment of which aired 26 May 1994, before being replaced by ATV-10's Ten News at 5.

=== 21st century developments ===
On 1 July 2016, Southern Cross switched its primary affiliation from Network Ten to the Nine Network in Queensland, Southern NSW, ACT, South Australia, and Victoria. The Southern Cross Ten branding was retired and replaced by generic Nine branding.

On 1 July 2021, Southern Cross switched back its primary affiliation from the Nine Network to Network 10 and airs programs from ATV in Melbourne.

On 17 December 2024, Southern Cross Austereo announced the sale of their regional television licenses in Regional Queensland, Southern NSW/ACT and Regional Victoria over to their affiliate Network 10. The sale was completed on 1 March 2025.

== Programming ==
=== News and current affairs ===
GLV/BCV broadcasts 10 News with Jennifer Keyte from ATV-10.

==== History ====
Between 21 March 2011 and 19 June 2015, viewers in Shepparton and the Goulburn Valley received a trial regional news magazine program called Weeknights at 6:30pm on weekdays.

Given its 1 July 2016 affiliate switch to the Nine Network, news updates were upgraded to a full bulletin relaunch as Nine Local News by March 2017. The then Nine affiliation served as the Nine News regional broadcaster to regional Victoria viewers, with the state and local level news provided by GTV-9 in Melbourne.

The bulletins' formats were stylistically similar to the Nine-owned NBN News bulletin in northern New South Wales as a composite of international, national, and local news.

On 17 March 2020, production on the composite bulletins, including Victoria, were suspended indefinitely due to the COVID-19 pandemic, with reporters deployed to the metropolitan bulletins in Sydney, Melbourne, and Brisbane.

As of 1 July 2021, 10 Regional Victoria broadcasts 10 News, broadcast from ATV's studios, with Keyte from Melbourne at 5:00pm and The Project at 6:30pm on weekdays and Sundays. Since 1 August 2021, Sky News Australia content has been offered in regional Victoria and on the channel Sky News Regional via GLV/BCV.

== Main transmitters ==
The following transmitters use the GLV call sign:

Region served	City	Channels (Analog/ Digital)	First air date	ERP (Analog/ Digital)	HAAT (Analog/ Digital) (Note: HAAT estimated from http://www.itu.int/SRTM3/ using EHAAT.)	Transmitter Coordinates	Transmitter Location
Goulburn Valley	Shepparton	46 (UHF) (Note: Analogue transmissions ceased as of 5 May 2011 as part of the conversion to digital television.); 42 (UHF)	1 January 1992	1200 kW; 300 kW	377 m 378 m	36°21′29″S 145°41′42″E	Mount Major
Latrobe Valley	Traralgon	37 (UHF) (Note: The Latrobe Valley station was on VHF channel 10 from its 1961 sign-on until 1980, moving to VHF channel 8 in order to accommodate 10 Melbourne's switch from VHF channel 0 to channel 10. It moved to its current channel in November 2000 (it began on 4 September 2000) in order to accommodate Nine Melbourne's digital television signal in Melbourne.); 39 (UHF)	9 December 1961	1000 kW; 400 kW	507 m 487 m	38°23′37″S 146°33′34″E	Mount Tassie

The following transmitters use the BCV call sign:

Region served	City	Channels (Analog/ Digital)	First air date	ERP (Analog/ Digital)	HAAT (Analog/ Digital)	Transmitter Coordinates	Transmitter Location
Ballarat	Ballarat	39 (UHF); 40 (UHF)	1 January 1992	2000 kW; 500 kW	663 m 713 m	37°16′57″S 143°14′52″E	Lookout Hill
Bendigo	Bendigo	8 (VHF) (Note: The Bendigo station also broadcasts on analogue (UHF) channel 38 with 1200 kW ERP at 508 m HAAT from 30 November 2000 as a countermeasure against interference with Nine Melbourne's digital signal, also on VHF channel 8.); 51 (UHF)	23 December 1961	240 kW; 1000 kW	444 m 496 m	36°59′26″S 144°18′32″E	Mount Alexander (transmitter damaged in Victorian bushfires, off-air since 9th January 2026)
Murray Valley	Swan Hill	10 (VHF) (Note: The Swan Hill station initially broadcast on VHF channel 11 as the relay of BCV-8 Bendigo from sign-on in 1967 until the early 1990s when it changed to VHF channel 10, to allow ABRV to move from VHF channel 3 to VHF channel 11.); 65 (UHF)	12 May 1967	150 kW; 375 kW	179 m 201 m	35°28′24″S 143°27′20″E	Goschen
Western Victoria	Hamilton	31 (UHF); 9A (VHF)	1 January 1992	200 kW; 15 kW	335 m 365 m	37°27′32″S 141°54′58″E (analog); 37°27′32″S 141°54′57″E (digital)	Mount Dundas
