= Seven Media Group =

Australian media company

Seven Media Group Limited
- Formerly: Macquarie Media Group Limited (2005–2009); Southern Cross Media Group (2009–2026)
- Type: Public
- Traded as: ASX: SMG
- Industry: Mass media
- Predecessor: Southern Cross Broadcasting; Seven West Media
- Founded: 2005; 21 years ago
- Headquarters: South Melbourne, Victoria, Australia
- Area served: Australia
- Key people: Rohan Lund (CEO); Ryan Stokes (Non-Executive Chair)
- Subsidiaries: Seven Network; Southern Cross Austereo; The West Australian
- Website: sevenmediagroup.com.au

Seven Media Group (formerly Macquarie Media Group and Southern Cross Media Group) is an Australian media conglomerate based in South Melbourne that specialises in broadcast television, radio, print and online publishing. It owns the Seven Network, Australia's second-largest commercial television network (by audience and advertising market share) and Southern Cross Austereo, as well as the newspapers The West Australian and The Sunday Times.

It was announced in September 2025 that Southern Cross Media Group and Seven West Media were planning to merge. The merger was completed on 7 January 2026. The company was rebranded as Seven Media Group on 5 November 2026.

== History ==
On 3 July 2007 Southern Cross Broadcasting recommended Macquarie Media Group's offer of A$1.35 billion, for a takeover of the corporation. Under the deal, Macquarie Media Group would then onsell the metropolitan radio stations to Fairfax Media. On 5 November 2007, the company officially acquired Southern Cross Broadcasting's assets. On 17 December 2009 shareholders approved a restructuring plan. The company was then renamed from Macquarie Media Group to its current name on 17 December 2009.

In March 2016, Macquarie Group sold a 15.7% stake in Southern Cross Media worth $130 million, and of that 9.9% was purchased by Nine Entertainment, the owner of the Nine Network. Nine sold this stake in the business six months later.

Following Seven West Media's acquisition of Southern Cross Austereo's remaining television assets in July 2025 and SCA's exit from television, Seven West and Southern Cross Media announced their intention to merge by early 2026. The merger was completed on 7 January 2026. Seven West Media's CEO Jeff Howard lead the merged companies as CEO and Manager Director until late February 2026, with Southern Cross Chairman Heith Mackay-Cruise succeeding Kerry Stokes as group Chairman. The company was rebranded as Seven Media Group on 5 November 2026, after being announced on 22 October 2026 at their upfronts.

== Assets ==
=== Television ===
- Seven Network
  - 7two — Australian free-to-air digital television multichannel suitable for people 55+
  - 7mate — Australian free-to-air digital television multichannel aimed at men 16 to 54-year-olds.
  - 7Bravo — Australian free-to-air digital television multichannel featuring reality and true crime programs.
  - 7flix — Australian free-to-air digital television multichannel featuring kids, family programs and movies.
  - Racing.com — Australian free-to-air standard definition digital television channel co-owned and co-operated with Racing Victoria.
  - 7plus — video on demand, catch-up TV service which carries the main and multichannels of the Seven Network.
- CDT — 10 Central (joint venture with Imparja Television)
- DTD — 10 Darwin (joint venture with Nine Entertainment)
- TDT — 10 Tasmania (joint venture with WIN Corporation)
- West Digital Television — 10 Regional Western Australia (joint venture with WIN Corporation)
- SGS/SCN — 10 Spencer Gulf & Broken Hill
- GDS/BDN — Nine Spencer Gulf & Broken Hill

=== Radio ===
- Southern Cross Austereo
  - Hit Network — metropolitan and regional radio, hot adult contemporary
  - Triple M — metropolitan and regional radio, mainstream rock/modern adult contemporary
  - LiSTNR — audio application for live and on demand access to podcasts and radio stations

=== News and other ===
- bloo Western Australian business search and website advertising project
- Community Newspaper Group
- 67% of Hybrid Television Services exclusive licensee of TiVo in Australia and New Zealand from 2008.
- The West Australian
- The Nightly
- The Sunday Times
- Wjobs
- 23 regional newspapers and magazines
- 4 business directories across the State
- the Streetsmart and Travellers Atlas street directories
- the quarterly Vita and Habitat & Lifestyle magazines
- Two commercial printing plants
- American Consolidated Media (10% non-voting stake)
