= TND (TV station) =

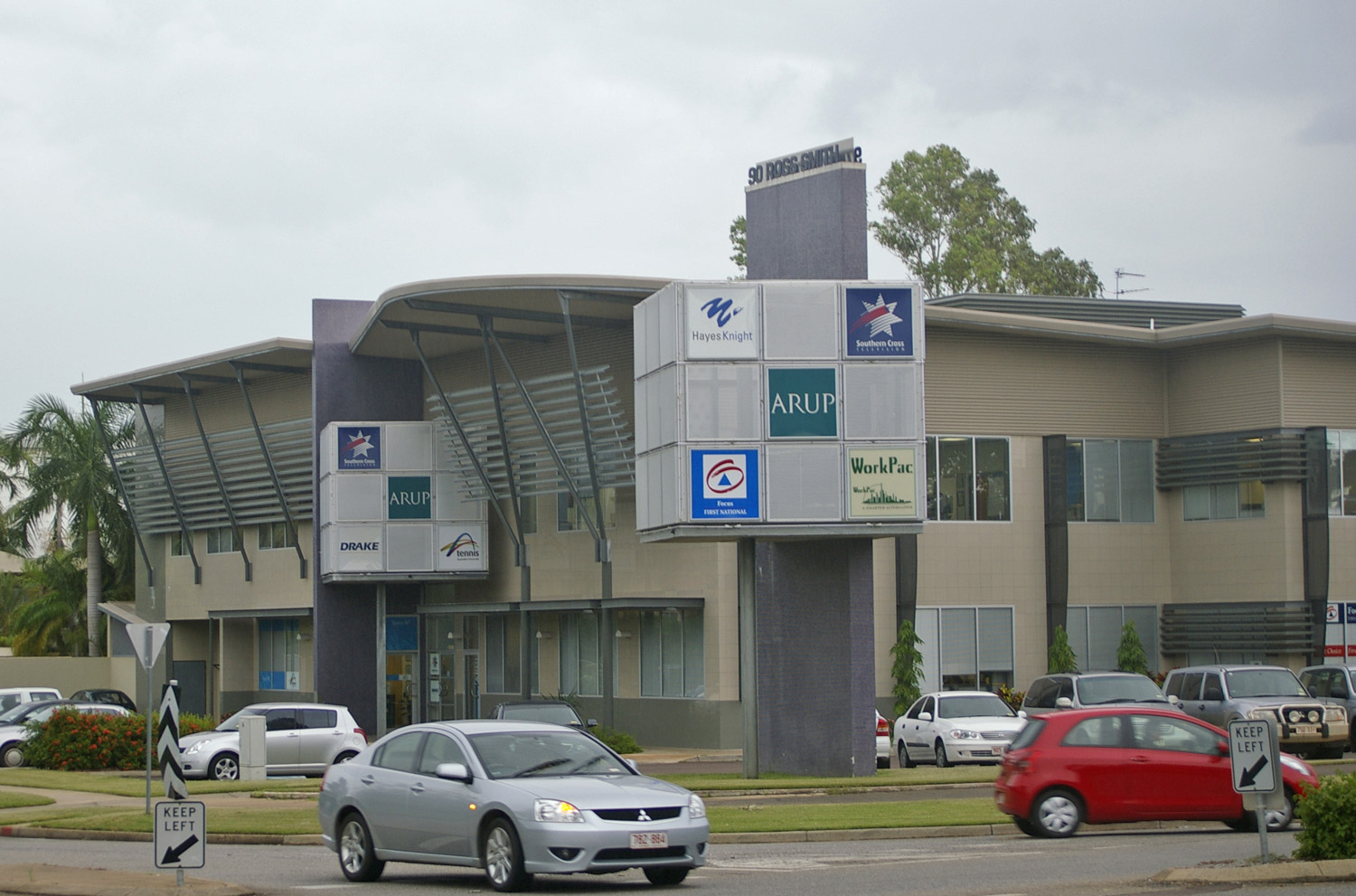
- Station office in Fannie Bay
- Darwin, Northern Territory; Australia
- Channels: Digital: 32 (UHF); Virtual: 7
- Branding: Seven

Programming
- Language: English
- Network: Seven

Ownership
- Owner: Seven Media Group; (Regional Television Pty Ltd)
- Sister stations: 7HD; 7two; 7mate

History
- First air date: 27 March 1998
- Former channel number: Analog: 34 (UHF) (1998–2013)
- Former affiliations: Ten (secondary, 2005–2008)
- Call sign meaning: Television Northern Darwin

Technical information
- Licensing authority: ACMA
- ERP: 85 kW
- HAAT: 147 m
- Transmitter coordinates: 12°24′52″S 130°58′9″E
- Repeaters: Batchelor (ch. 42, 50 watts); Darwin City (ch. 42, 200 watts)

Links
- Public licence information: Profile

TND is a television station in Darwin, Northern Territory. The station, launched in 1998 as Seven Darwin and broadcasting across Darwin, Palmerston and surrounding areas, is owned by Seven Media Group. Its main competitor is the Nine Network's affiliated station, NTD.

== Programming ==
As Seven Darwin, TND-34 existed as essentially a re-broadcast of SCB's remote Australia satellite service Seven Central, apart from localised adverts, inserted at SCB's playout centre in Townsville, Queensland, and delivered to Darwin via Optus Transcontinental Fibre Optic cable. The station also carries Seven News Brisbane bulletins from BTQ.

From 2005 until 2008, the station held affiliations with Network 10, after the Ten affiliation was relinquished by NTD-8 as it became Nine Darwin. At this time, Seven Darwin changed its name to Southern Cross Darwin. Since 2008, the station only holds affiliations with the Seven Network.

Like its Tasmanian and Spencer Gulf/Broken Hill sister stations, the Seven Network affiliation remains the primary one. The Network Ten affiliation was, in 2008, expected to be dropped from Southern Cross Darwin and given to a digital-only third channel (such as those found in Tasmania and Mildura), as proposed by the Australian Communications and Media Authority.

Despite the change in name and affiliation of TND-34, Seven Central remained as a fully Seven Network-aligned service for remote Australia. Since 2008, Seven Central has carried a small amount of 10 Sport programming, in response to rival broadcaster Imparja Television dropping its Network Ten licence early in the year.

In 2008, Southern Cross Darwin ceased broadcasting its last Ten content, as it was moved to Darwin Digital Television. The station has carried a sole Seven affiliate, on relay from Melbourne instead of Brisbane or Adelaide, despite time zone differences between Northern Territory and Victoria.

On 1 July 2018, local branding on all of Southern Cross' Seven-affiliated stations was phased out to be replaced by generic Seven Network branding. Consequently, Southern Cross Darwin became Seven Darwin, the station's original identity that had not been in use for the past ten years.

Seven Darwin has the rights to broadcast AFL NT matches on their sister channel 7two during the AFL Season. The matches usually air on weekends as daytime viewing.

TNT launched 7HD in Darwin on 26 November 2018.

The sale of Southern Cross Austereo's Seven-affiliated stations to Seven West Media was finalised in July 2025.

== News updates ==
Under previous owners, a local Seven News bulletin for Darwin and Central Australia was produced until 2000. Separate news update services for Darwin were introduced in 2005 before being merged with updates for remote Australia into one service in 2013 – the updates were later separated in 2018. The shared three-minute short news updates throughout the day are broadcast on ITQ/QQQ serving remote areas and TND in Darwin, presented from studios in Hobart.

== See also ==
- QQQ
