= Spree TV =

Australian television shopping channel

- Country: Australia
- Broadcast area: Sydney, Melbourne, Brisbane, Adelaide and Perth
- Network: Network 10

Programming
- Language(s): English
- Picture format: 576i (SDTV) 16:9

Ownership
- Owner: Ten Network Holdings
- Parent: Paramount Networks UK & Australia
- Sister channels: Channel 10; 10 HD; 10 Peach; 10 Bold; 10 Shake; TVSN

History
- Launched: 17 September 2013; 11 years ago
- Closed: 12 August 2022; 2 years ago
- Replaced by: Gecko

Availability

Terrestrial
- Freeview: 17, on Network 10–owned transmitters

Spree TV was an Australian free-to-air datacasting television channel mainly carrying paid programming and informercials, launched on 17 September 2013 by Ten Network Holdings and Brand Developers.

Though datacasting was intended by the Labor government at the time to broadcast telecourses and other non-commercial content, without any legislative restriction on its use, most Australian broadcasters have utilized the datacasting services for home shopping instead. For the most part however, the general public has ignored these datacasting informercial channels, resulting in their swift discontinuation. Aspire TV, a similar channel by content, met this fate a year before on 31 July 2021.

Spree TV first aired on channel 15, before Ten Network Holdings moved it to channel 17 on 16 September 2020 to make way for the launch of 10 Shake (now Nickelodeon) on 27 September 2020. It went off the air on 12 August 2022. Gecko, a similarly formatted home shopping network, launched in its space on 18 September 2022.

== See also ==
- List of digital television channels in Australia
