= TVQ =

- Brisbane, Queensland; Australia
- Channels: Digital: 11 (VHF); Virtual: 10
- Branding: 10

Programming
- Language: English
- Network: 10

Ownership
- Owner: Warner Bros. Discovery Asia-Pacific (Ten Network Holdings); (Network Ten (Brisbane) Pty Ltd)

History
- First air date: 1 July 1965
- Former names: TV0 (1983–1988)
- Former channel numbers: Analog: 0 (VHF) (1965–1988); Analog: 10 (VHF) (1988–2013); Analog: 4 (some analog TVs) (VHF) (198?-2013)
- Call sign meaning: Television Queensland

Technical information
- Licensing authority: Australian Communications and Media Authority
- ERP: 50 kW
- HAAT: 385 m
- Transmitter coordinates: 27°27′47″S 152°56′54″E

Links
- Public licence information: Profile
- Website: 10.com.au

TVQ is the Brisbane television station of Network 10 in Australia.

== History ==
In April 1964, the Postmaster-General's Department granted Universal Telecasters a broadcasting licence. The channel was allocated channel 0 (the 0 was pronounced as the letter O instead of "zero") on the VHF band and commenced broadcasting on 1 July 1965 as TVQ-0. Ansett Transport Industries initially held a 49% shareholding, before acquiring the remaining shares in 1970.

After News Limited acquired a controlling stake in Ansett, it was required to sell TVQ due to restrictions on the number of television stations one organisation could own. TVQ was sold to Ampol (67%) and 2SM (33%). In 1984 TVQ was purchased by Qintex.

On 17 September 1987, Darling Downs Telecasters, owner of DDQ10 Toowoomba, purchases TVQ for $123 million, and announces plans to convert the station to the Channel 10 frequency.

On 10 September 1988, DDQ-10 switched frequency to DDQ-0, and TVQ changed frequency to become TVQ-10, in time for the channel's broadcast of the 1988 Summer Olympics, at the same time as its broadcasts of World Expo 88, of which it and the entire Network Ten was the official station.

On 30 November 2015, lightning struck the TVQ transmission tower, cutting its power and lighting.

== Digital multiplex ==
LCN	Service	SD/HD
1	10 HD	HD
10	10	SD
11	10 Comedy	SD
12	10 Drama	HD
13	Nickelodeon	SD
15	10 HD	HD
16	You.tv	SD
17	Gecko TV	SD

== Programming ==
=== Current in-house productions ===
- 10 News: Queensland (1965–2020, 2024–present)

=== Past productions ===
- Shake Takes (2020–2022)
- Gamify (2019–2020)
- Scope (2005–2020)
- Toasted TV (2005–2020)
- Crocamole (2016–2019)
- Couch Time (2011–2017)
- Wurrawhy (2011–2016)
- Puzzle Play (2006–2011)
- ttn (2004–2008)
- In the Box (1998–2006)
- Ocean Girl (1994–1997)
- Totally Wild (1992–2021)
- Jacki Mac Breakfast Show (1980)
- Have A Go Show (1980)
- The Saturday Show (1967–1970s)
- Fat Cat and Friends
- Funville (1966-1970s)
- Just A Minute (1987)
- This Week at Expo (1988)
- Newsmakers
- Brisbane With Anna McMahon (1990)
- Living (1980s)
- Early Birds (1980s)
- Countdown (1960s)
- Frightful Movies with Deadly Earnest (1967–1968)

== News and current affairs ==
TVQ-10 produces a 60-minute local news program at 5:00 pm on weeknights.

10 News Queensland is presented from the network's Mount Coot-tha studios by Sharyn Ghidella with sports presenter Veronica Eggleton and weather presenter Liz Cantor.

TVQ-0 did not operate a news service until 1974 when it launched News Watch. The bulletin later adopted the branding Eyewitness News after rival channel BTQ-7 had relinquished the name, and became the first Brisbane newscast to use videotape for its reports. Eyewitness News continued as a nightly half-hour bulletin until 1984 when it was expanded to a one-hour format (the last Network Ten station at that time to convert to the one hour newscast used in other major Australian cities save for Perth). The station won a Logie award in 1986 for Best News Report for its coverage of the siege at Eagle Farm Airport the previous year.

With TVQ as the host broadcaster for World Expo 88, Eyewitness News shifted its newsroom operation and production to the TVQ stand at the Expo site, putting itself on show to the general public for the entire six-month duration of Expo. After the close of Expo on 30 October 1988, the newsroom returned to the Mount Coot-tha studios to a refurbished news set and a branding refresh to Ten News (acknowledging the channel's transition from VHF Channel 0 to 10 and bringing TVQ into line with Network Ten stations in other states).

The Eyewitness News brand returned in July 1989 coinciding with the network relaunch, and it was later renamed as Ten Evening News in January 1990 and then as Ten Eyewitness News in January 1991. In 1994, the Ten News brand was revived for the 2nd time. In September 2013, Ten once again revived the Eyewitness News branding for all its newscasts after a 19-year break. The branding changed to 10 News First in October 2018, in line with the network's broader re-branding to 10.

In September 2020, studio production of the Queensland bulletin was transferred to Network 10's Sydney headquarters, leading to redundancies among presentation and production staff at the Brisbane studios.

On 15 August 2024, it was announced that the standalone Queensland bulletin would return to Mount Coot-tha from 2 September, to be presented by Sharyn Ghidella.

=== Presenters and reporters ===
News presenter

- Sharyn Ghidella (2024–present)

Sports presenter

- Veronica Eggleton (2024–present)

Weather presenter

- Liz Cantor (2024–present)

=== Past news presenters ===
- Sandra Sully (1990s, 2020–24 from Sydney)
- Lachlan Kennedy (2015–2017)
- Georgina Lewis (2007–2020)
- Bill McDonald (2003–2012)
- Marie-Louise Theile (1991–1993, 1997–2007)
- Juanita Phillips (1990–1993)
- Tracey Spicer (1994–1996)
- Bruce Paige (1990)
- Jacki MacDonald (1983)
- Kay McGrath (1981–1987)
- Des McWilliam
- Brian Cahill
- Tony Ryan
- Rob Readings
- Chris Collins
- Geoff Mullins
- David Jull
- Neville Roberts
- Robin Parkin

=== Past sports reporters ===
- Matt Burke (2020–24 from Sydney)
- Johnathan Williams
- Peter O'Dempsey
- Michael Voss (2007–2008)
- Brad McEwan (2004–2006)
- Bill McDonald (1996–2003)
