= CDT (TV station) =

Television station in eastern Australia

IDQ / CDT
- IDQ: Mount Isa, Queensland CDT: Remote Central and Eastern Australia; Australia
- Channels: Digital: Various; Virtual: 10

Programming
- Language: English
- Affiliations: 10

Ownership
- Owner: Seven Media Group and Imparja Television Pty Ltd; (Central Digital Television Pty Ltd)
- Sister stations: 10 Comedy; 10 Drama

History
- First air date: 30 June 2010
- Call sign meaning: ITQ Digital/Queensland; Central Digital Television

Technical information
- Licensing authority: Australian Communications and Media Authority

CDT is an Australian digital television station broadcasting in remote central and eastern Australia. It is jointly owned by Seven Media Group (owner of Seven Central) and Imparja Television Pty Ltd (owner of Imparja Television) and operates under the company name Central Digital Television.

The station is available via satellite and terrestrial platforms and free-to-air on a number of digital terrestrial transmitters, in remote areas of Australia.

The station is similar to other joint venture services already available in Tasmania, Darwin and Western Australia. Officially, the service's call sign is CDT in the Remote Central and Eastern Australia TV2 licence areas, and IDQ in the Mount Isa TV1 licence area (reflecting the status of sister station ITQ).

== History ==
Central Digital Television began broadcasting Ten Central, One HD and One SD as digital satellite channels on 30 June 2010, the same day as the Viewer Access Satellite Television service was partially launched. Southern Cross Central and Imparja Television also commenced broadcasting digital satellite channels on the same day. The launch of the commercial digital channels coincided with the first analog television transmitter switch off in Mildura, Victoria. This was so viewers in the area who lost adequate television coverage were able to utilise VAST as an alternative source.

On 10 December 2010, VAST officially launched and began granting access to viewers in the Remote Central and Eastern Australia licence areas. This brought digital television to satellite viewers in the Northern Territory, Queensland and South Australia for the first time. Digital terrestrial transmissions began in Alice Springs, Northern Territory and Mount Isa, Queensland on 2 May 2011, with other areas launching between 2012 and 2013.

The sale Southern Cross Austereo's Seven-affiliated stations, alongside its stake in CDT, to Seven West Media was finalised in July 2025.

In January 2026, Seven West Media merged with SCA's parent company, Southern Cross Media Group. With the merger, Southern Cross Media regained its stake in CDT.

== Programming ==
CDT is affiliated to Network 10, but sources programming from two stations. 10 Central North is sourced from TVQ Brisbane, and airs 10 News Queensland nightly at 5pm, as well as sports and events live in the Brisbane market. 10 Central South is sourced from ATV Melbourne, including 10 News First: Victoria nightly at 5pm and live Melbourne-based sports and events, especially during the winter months. 10 Central South is sourced from TEN Sydney, including 10 News New South Wales nightly at 5pm and live Sydney-based sports and events, especially during the summer months. 10 Drama Central and 10 Comedy Central South are also sourced from ATV Melbourne (during the winter months) and TEN Sydney (during the summer months), while 10 Comedy Central North is from TVQ Brisbane (during the winter and summer months).

Previously they broadcast Network 10 programming across their primary and multi channels, through 10 Central North relaying the Melbourne feed of ATV while 10 Central South continued to relay the Adelaide feed of ADS, the stations had also carried the Melbourne and Adelaide schedules of 10 Comedy and 10 Drama through their secondary services.

=== News and current affairs ===
CDT simulcasts the weekday edition of 10 News from TVQ-10 in Brisbane (north) and TEN-10 in Sydney (south), along with the weekend edition of 10 News from TEN-10 in Sydney.

== Availability ==
=== Terrestrial ===
Central Digital Television broadcasts free-to-air digital television channels 10 Central, 10 Comedy and 10 Drama via terrestrial transmissions in many regional cities and towns. The service is licensed to broadcast within the Remote Central and Eastern Australia TV2 and Mt Isa TV1 licence areas, which include Alice Springs, Bourke, Ceduna, Charleville, Coober Pedy, Cooktown, Katherine, Longreach, Mount Isa, Roma and Weipa, as well as others.

=== Satellite ===
A digital satellite transmission of CDT's channels is available free-to-view on the VAST service in all states and territories of Australia, except Western Australia. 10 Drama is broadcast as a single channel to all viewers, while 10 Central and 10 Comedy are each split into two separate channels. 10 Central North and 10 Comedy North are broadcast in Australian Eastern Standard Time for viewers in Northern Territory and Queensland (Northern Australia TV3 licence area), and 10 Central South and 10 Comedy South in Australian Eastern Summer Time for viewers in New South Wales, Victoria, South Australia, Tasmania and Norfolk Island (South Eastern Australia TV3 licence area).

10 Central North and 10 Central South are broadcast in 1080i HDTV.

== See also ==
- Network 10
- Seven Central
- Imparja Television
