= The Music Shop (TV series) =

- Genre: Pre-school television
- Starring: Emma Buter; Danny Cowles; Debora Krizak; Jo Stone
- Country of origin: Australia
- Original language: English
- No. of seasons: 4

Production
- Producer: Joey Kennedy
- Production locations: Adelaide, South Australia
- Running time: 30 minutes (no ads)

Original release
- Network: Network Ten
- Release: 5 August 1996 – 27 November 1998

Related
- Mulligrubs (1988–1996); In the Box (1998–2006)

The Music Shop is an Australian children's television series that aired on Network Ten from 5 August 1996 to 27 November 1998. The series was made by affiliate ADS in Adelaide and was aimed at pre-schoolers.

The concept revolved around three human host, played by Michelle Nightingale, Debora Krizak and Dianne Dixon. who interacted with the two costumed characters, a Goanna and a Crow, as their participated in various activities at a Music Shop.
