= TEN (TV station) =

Australian TV station

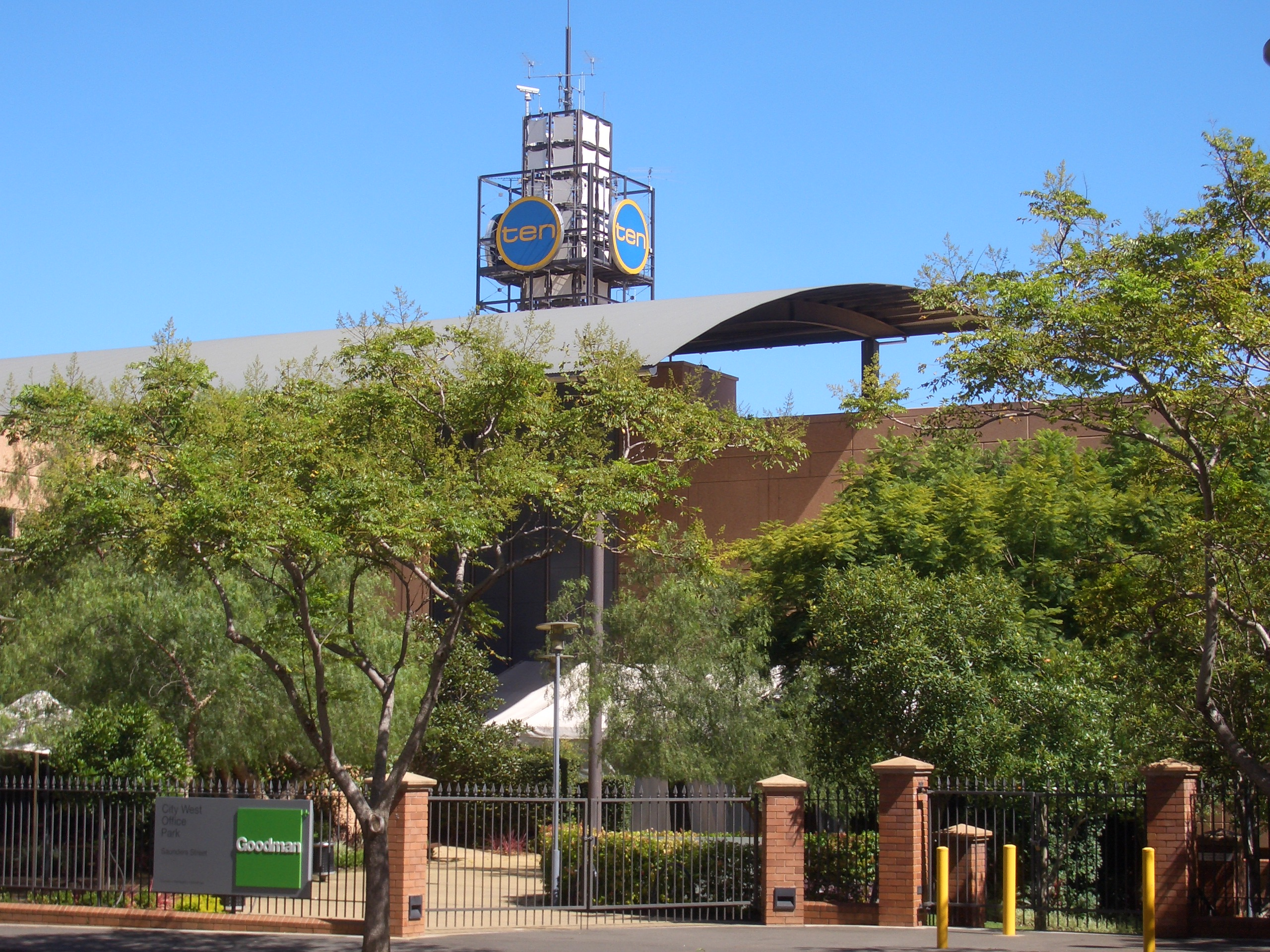
- Sydney, New South Wales; Australia
- Channels: Digital: 11 (VHF); Virtual: 10
- Branding: 10

Programming
- Language: English
- Affiliations: 10 (O&O)

Ownership
- Owner: Warner Bros. Discovery Asia-Pacific (Ten Network Holdings); (Network TEN (Sydney) Pty Ltd)

History
- First air date: 5 April 1965
- Former channel number: Analog: 10 (VHF) (1965–2013)
- Call sign meaning: "Ten" (N in last letter from location in New South Wales)

Technical information
- Licensing authority: Australian Communications and Media Authority
- ERP: 200 kW (analog); 50 kW (digital)
- HAAT: 249 m (analog); 251 m (digital)
- Transmitter coordinates: 33°48′20″S 151°10′51″E

Links
- Website: 10.com.au

TEN is Network 10's flagship station in Sydney. It was originally owned and operated by United Telecasters Sydney Limited (UTSL), and began transmission on 5 April 1965 with the highlight of the opening night being the variety special TV Spells Magic. It also serves as the Australian headquarters of Paramount.

== History ==
Ten commenced broadcasting on 5 April 1965 after United Telecasters was granted a Sydney commercial broadcasting licence. Shareholders in United Telecasters included Amalgamated Wireless, Colonial Sugar Refining and Email with 14% each, Bank of New South Wales with 7.5% and the NRMA with 2.5%.

TEN often lagged in the ratings behind the more established commercial channels TCN (Nine) and ATN (Seven) who had dominated viewing habits in Sydney for eight years. The turning point came in 1972 with the premiere of the raunchy soap opera series Number 96 which immediately lifted TEN's overall profile and helped raise the ailing network to No. 1 position by 1973.

TEN launched Australia's first metropolitan nightly one-hour news bulletin in 1975, while NBN-3 in Newcastle was first to air a one-hour news service in Australia in 1972. In 1978, Katrina Lee became only the third female TV newsreader on Australian TV – the first being Melody Iliffe on QTQ-9. The current anchor for the 10 News 5pm Sydney news bulletin on weeknights is Sandra Sully.

TEN commenced digital television transmission on 1 January 2001, broadcasting on VHF Channel 11 while maintaining analogue transmission on VHF Channel 10.

The analogue signal for TEN was shut off on 3 December 2013.

Since 2021, the Pyrmont premises also houses office facilities for Network 10 sister channels MTV and Nickelodeon.

== Digital multiplex ==
LCN	Service	SD/HD
1	no longer broadcast	N/A
10	10 HD	HD
11	10 Comedy	HD
12	10 Drama	HD
13	Nickelodeon	SD
14	10+1 (from Aug 10 2026)	HD
15	10 HD	HD
16	You.tv	SD
17	Gecko TV	SD

== Studio facilities ==
TEN's broadcast facilities have been in the inner city suburb of Pyrmont since 1997. These studios feature a large open plan newsroom and news-set where all Ten's national and local Sydney news bulletins are produced. This facility is also the network's head office and broadcasts the network signal to other cities. When TEN-10 opened in 1965, it operated from newly built studio facilities at North Ryde, these were sold in the 1990s when the network underwent financial turmoil. The North Ryde complex, which was used by Global Television in recent years, was demolished in September 2007. Following the move from North Ryde in 1991, TEN relocated to a small warehouse in Ultimo, and then to new studios in nearby Pyrmont in May 1997. Most series are produced on location or at external studios by external companies, but a few programs are made in-house by TEN.

- North Ryde (1965 – March 1991)
- Ultimo (March 1991 – May 1997)
- Pyrmont (May 1997 – present)

=== Current programs produced at Ten's Pyrmont Studios ===
- 10 News Sydney (1965–present)
- 10 News Adelaide (Mondays–Thursdays, 2023–present)^{1}
- 10 News: Weekend (1994–present)
- 10 News: Lunchtime (Weekdays, 2023–present)
- 10 Late News (1991–2011, 2012–2014, 2024–present)
- 10 News+ (2025–present)
- Shaun Micallef's Parents' Evening (2026–present)

^{1}Sport and Weather is still presented from the Adelaide studios in Eastwood. The Friday bulletin, presented by Tiffany Warne, is also presented from Adelaide.

=== Past productions at Ten's Sydney Studios ===
- 10 News: Afternoon (Weekdays, 2024–2025)
- The Sunday Project (2017–2025, shared with Melbourne studios)
- 10 News Queensland (2020–2024)^{2}
- Ready Steady Cook (2005–2013, 2024)
- 10 News Perth (2001–2008, September 2020–March 2023)^{3}
- 10 News First: Breakfast (Mondays–Wednesdays, 2022)^{4}
- Studio 10 (2013–2023)
- MotoGP coverage (2019–2023)
- Rugby coverage (2019–2020)
- Supercars coverage (1997–2006, 2015–2020)
- Rugby World Cup Live Coverage (1995, 2007, 2019)
- Sports Tonight (1993–2011, 2018–2020)
- Hughesy, We Have a Problem (2018–2021)
- Saturday Night Rove (2018–2019)
- Celebrity Name Game (2019)
- The Loop on 10 Peach (2012–2020)
- The Living Room (2012–2019)
- Pointless (2018–2019)
- Show Me the Movie! (2018–2019)
- Family Feud (2017–2018; 2020)
- Cram! (2017)
- Rugby coverage (2013–2016, moved to ATV Melbourne 2017–2019)
- Formula One coverage (2003–2017)
- Wake Up (2013–2014)
- Ten Eyewitness News Early (2006–2012, 2013–2014)
- Ten Eyewitness News Morning (1980–1990, 1994–2012, 2013–2014)
- Revealed (2013)
- Wanted (2013)
- The Bachelor Australia: After the Final Rose Special (2013)
- Breakfast (2012)
- 6.30 with George Negus (2011)
- The Game Plan (NRL) (2011–2013)
- World Football News (2009–2011, ONE HD)
- The Pro Shop (2009–2011, ONE HD)
- Overtime (2009–2011, ONE HD)
- MVP (2009–2010, ONE HD)
- Thursday Night Live (2009–2010, ONE HD)
- Friday Night Download (2008)
- The Ronnie Johns Half Hour (2005–2006)
- Big Brother: Uncut (2003–2004)
- Big Brother: The Insider (2003)
- RPM (1997–2008, 2011–2012, 2015–2020)
- Cheez TV (1995–2005)
- Meet the Press (1992–2011, 2013–2014)
- Video Hits (1987–2011)
- Good Morning Australia (1981–1992)
- Number 96 (1972–1977)
- Aweful Movies with Deadly Earnest (1966–1970)

^{2} Merged with the Sydney bulletin, with opt-outs for local news, sport and weather. Ceased on 30 August 2024.
^{3} Sport was still presented from Perth.
^{4} The Thursday and Friday bulletins were presented from Melbourne.

== Station slogans ==
- 5 Apr. 1965: Turn To Ten Tonight
- 1965: Turn To Ten
- 1969: One of Australia's Great Television Stations!
- 1973–1975: MacArthur Park
- 1974–1975: First in Colour
- 1977–1978: I Like It!
- 1978: Channel TEN is the Great Entertainer!
- 1979–1980: Come Up, Come Up to TEN
- 1981: Star Station Ten
- 1982–1983: You're on Channel Ten
- 1983–1984: You're Home When You're Home on Ten
- 1985–1988: 10 out of 10 Australia!
- 1994: That's Sydney!
- 5 April 1995: Happy Birthday, Give Me Ten!

== News and current affairs ==
TEN-10 produces a local news program on weeknights from its studios at Pyrmont. 10 News Sydney is presented by Sandra Sully on weekdays and Georgie Tunny on weekends with sport presenters Tara Rushton (Monday-Friday) and Scott Mackinnon (Saturday and Sunday), weather presenters Josh Holt (weekdays) and Amanda Jason (weekends) and traffic reporter Vic Lorusso.

The 5pm bulletin was presented for almost eleven years by Ron Wilson and Jessica Rowe, between 1996 and 2005, when Rowe moved to present the Nine Network's Today. She was replaced by the network's US correspondent Deborah Knight from 2006. Wilson anchored the nightly Sydney news until January 2009 when he became a presenter of the national Early News and was replaced by Bill Woods. Knight was replaced by Sully in October 2011 following the axing of the network's long-running late night news program, as a result with Knight's decision to move to the Nine Network. Sully became sole anchor after Woods' departure on 30 November 2012, following the network's decision not to renew his contract.

Fill-in presenters include Scott Mackinnon (Sport) and Amanda Duval or Amanda Hart (Weather).

Between 2020–24, TEN-10 oversaw studio production of the Brisbane edition of 10 News. The Brisbane and Sydney bulletins were presented by Sandra Sully, combining local opt-outs for news, sport and weather with some shared content. For three years, TEN-10 also produced the Perth edition for viewers in WA until production returned to Perth in 2023, and presently co-produces the Adelaide edition for audiences in South Australia. In September 2024, production of the Brisbane bulletin was returned to Mount Coot-tha, with Sharyn Ghidella presenting.

=== Presenters and reporters ===
News presenter

- Sandra Sully (weeknights, 2011–present)
- Georgie Tunny (weekends, 2026–present)

Sports presenter

- Tara Rushton (weeknights, 2025–present)
- Scott Mackinnon (weekends)

Weather presenter

- Josh Holt (weeknights, 2020–present)
- Amanda Jason (weekends)

Fill-in presenters

- Scott Mackinnon (Sport)
- Amanda Duval
- Amanda Hart (Weather)

Reporters

- Melinda Nucifora
- Daniel Sutton
- Kimberley Soekov
- Amanda Hart
- Joe Hill
- Jessica Turner (Health)
- Hannah Maguire
- Angela Bishop (Entertainment)
- Adam Walters

== See also ==
- Television broadcasting in Australia
