= Mulligrubs =

Australian television series with a preschool demographic

- Genre: Pre-school television
- Directed by: Gary Juleff
- Starring: Diana Kidd as Mulligrub; John Schumann; Mark Reedman; Nick Vall; Angela Smith; Gina Zoia; Sally Playford; Ray Wheeler; Megan Harris; Sue Harris; Coin Pyrlis; Jo England; Pip Burford; Nick Civetta
- Theme music composer: Chris Harriott
- Country of origin: Australia
- Original language: English
- No. of seasons: 9
- No. of episodes: 550

Production
- Executive producer: Ian Fairweather
- Producer: Elizabeth Mansutti
- Production locations: Adelaide, South Australia
- Running time: 30 minutes (no ads)

Original release
- Network: Network Ten
- Release: 30 May 1988 – 28 June 1996

Related
- The Music Shop (1996–1998); In the Box (1998-2006)

Mulligrubs is an Australian children's television series that aired on Network Ten from 30 May 1988 to 28 June 1996. The series was made by affiliate ADS in Adelaide and was aimed at pre-schoolers.

About 550 episodes were made, with about 425 being stored intact at the National Film and Sound Archive of Australia.

The show was best remembered for the face (made up of just eyes, eyebrows, nostrils and mouth) on a blue screen that appeared occasionally during the program. The actress who played the part of 'the face' was Diana Kidd (born circa. 1951–1952).
