= Puzzle Play =

- Liam, Kell and Patrick
- Genre: Pre-school
- Starring: Patrick, Liam and Kell
- Country of origin: Australia
- Original language: English
- No. of seasons: 5

Production
- Production locations: Brisbane, Queensland
- Running time: 30 minutes

Original release
- Network: Network Ten
- Release: 21 December 2006 – 28 January 2011

Related
- In the Box; Wurrawhy

Puzzle Play was an Australian pre-school themed TV show for young children that aired Monday to Thursday from 8:30 am to 9:00 am on Network Ten.

The program premiered on 21 December 2006 replacing the program In the Box. The hosts were Kellyn Morris, Patrick MacDonald and Liam Nunan. Scriptwriter and Producer was Bettina Toth.

Each clue was usually a video with a host narrating about the shape with information about it. As the pieces were being removed, a picture was revealed in the background and in the end, the three hosts guessed what the picture was about. The hosts visited schools, preschools, kindergartens and parks. As of 2024, the series can be viewed on YouTube.

Puzzle Play was replaced on 31 January 2011 by Wurrawhy.

== See also ==
- List of Australian television series
