= MGS/LRS =

Television station in South Australia

MGS / LRS
- MGS: Mount Gambier, South Australia LRS: Riverland, South Australia; Australia
- Channels: Digital: MGS: 32 (UHF) LRS: 35 (UHF)
- Branding: 10

Programming
- Language: English
- Network: WIN Television
- Affiliations: 10

Ownership
- Owner: WIN Corporation; (WIN Television SA Pty Ltd)
- Sister stations: SES/RTS

History
- First air date: 1 January 2004
- Last air date: 9 October 2026 (22 years, 9 months and 8 days)
- Former channel numbers: Analog: MGS: 41 (VHF); LRS: 34 (VHF)
- Call sign meaning: MGS: Mount; Gambier; South Australia; LRS: Loxton; Riverland; South Australia

Technical information
- Licensing authority: Australian Communications and Media Authority
- ERP: MGS: 200 kW; LRS: 240 kW
- HAAT: MGS: 379 m (1,243 ft); LRS: 180 m (591 ft)
- Transmitter coordinates: MGS: 37°36′8″S 140°28′58″E; LRS: 34°27′52″S 140°32′1″E

Links
- Website: www.wintv.com.au

MGS and LRS were television stations owned by WIN Corporation in South Australia. Both were relays of ADS-10 in Adelaide up until their closure in October 2026.

Before 2004, SES was the only commercial television station broadcasting in Mount Gambier and the southeast of South Australia. The SES studios were located on John Watson Drive, Mount Gambier. RTS was the only commercial television station in the Riverland region of South Australia, with its studio on Murray Bridge Road, Loxton. Both stations broadcast a mixture of programs derived from the Seven Network, Nine Network, and Network Ten. The 2004 introduction of sole Network Ten affiliate, MGS and LRS, was the second commercial television station in the region – following this, SES/RTS became a sole Nine Network affiliate (until September 2007), only sports programs (particularly AFL matches) were acquired from the Seven Network.

At 9:00 a.m. on 15 December 2010, MGS/LRS's analog signal were switched off, along with SES/RTS.

Between 1 July 2016 and 1 July 2021, WIN entered a new affiliation deal with Network 10. During this time, MGS/LRS programming was branded as "WIN". When WIN returned to their affiliation with the Nine Network, branding was restored as "10".

On 18 May 2026, it was announced that MGS/LRS and sister 10 affiliate MDN in Griffith would cease broadcasting from 1 July 2026 due to financial pressures of continuing services in smaller television markets. Days before the deadline, WIN and Network 10 agreed to a temporary three-month deal where Network 10 would provide their programming for free until 30 September, with both continuing to explore options going forward. These events followed a similar situation between the WIN and the Seven networks a year prior over program supply in the same areas. On 2 October, WIN announced that continuing to supply programming to these areas beyond the temporary supply deal was not commercially viable, and would cease broadcasting Network 10 content on 9 October.

== Programming ==
MGS/LRS broadcasts programs from Network 10, including the Adelaide edition of 10 News presented from the studios of ADS Adelaide, and national news bulletins. The station also carries the Adelaide feeds of 10 Comedy and 10 Drama.

== See also ==
- WIN Television
- Network 10
