= Jessica Skarratt =

Australian television presenter

Jessica Skarratt is an Australian television presenter. She is a former presenter of the long running nature and science themed series Totally Wild. Skarratt has also presented Suns TV a television program that is carried by the Seven Network and is shown thirty minutes prior to Gold Coast Suns games in Queensland and Surfing Australia TV on TV4ME and four documentaries for Network Ten, along with making an appearance on the popular Thank God You're Here (as a guest interviewer, not as a contestant).

On 9 February 2015, Jess Skarratt and Billy Bentley were confirmed as the new hosts for Couch Time.

Off camera Jess is an experienced charity and corporate events MC.
