= Couch Time =

Australian television block

- Genre: Television block
- Presented by: Labby Hawkins; Stav Davidson; Billy Bentley; Jess Skarratt; Carina Waye
- Country of origin: Australia
- Original language: English
- No. of seasons: 6
- No. of episodes: 1,620

Production
- Production locations: Brisbane, Queensland
- Running time: 2–4 minutes

Original release
- Network: Eleven
- Release: 11 January 2011 – 31 March 2017

Couch Time was an Australian television block, last hosted by Billy Bentley and Carina Waye, which aired weekday afternoons on Eleven, first going to air on 11 January 2011. The show was a hosted television block, consisting of external television series dispersed between hosted segments, described as "drive time radio for television". The program was originally hosted by Jason "Labby" Hawkins and Stewart "Stav" Davidson.

Couch Time aired its final episode on 31 March 2017.

== Hosts ==
Original Replacement Final

Name	First Show	Last Show
Jason "Labby" Hawkins	11 January 2011	2 January 2015
Stewart "Stav" Davidson	11 January 2011	2 January 2015
Billy Bentley	9 February 2015	31 March 2017
Jess Skarratt	9 February 2015	8 January 2016
Carina Waye	22 February 2016	31 March 2017

Notes

- Stav Davidson returned to the show as a guest on 29 January 2016.

== History ==
Couch Time premiered alongside the launch of Network Ten's new multichannel Eleven on 11 January 2011, originally created to have the hosts be recognised as "the faces of Eleven", and "add personality" to the channel. It was designed to draw a lead-in audience for Eleven's evening programs, especially Neighbours, originally hosted by radio presenters Jason "Labby" Hawkins and Stewart "Stav" Davidson. From its inception, the program aired weekday afternoons from 4:00 pm until 6:30 pm, introducing Neighbours. The show is filmed in Brisbane.

In January 2015, it was announced that Hawkins and Davidson would be leaving the show, with Hawkins moving to New Zealand, and the pair's Brisbane radio show also concluding. Ten confirmed that Couch Time had not been axed and that new hosts were being sought. The pair's final show was on 2 January 2015. The two new hosts were announced as Jess Skarratt and Billy Bentley, who began hosting the show on 9 February 2015, fronting a redesigned set and format. On 14 September 2015, the Neighbours-themed segment of Couch Time moved from before the night's episode to after, with the overall block airing from 4:00 pm until 7:00 pm.

In January 2016, it was announced that Skarratt would be leaving the show to return to university and that a replacement host would soon be found. Her final show was on 8 January 2016. To celebrate the show's fifth anniversary, a new-look set styled like a loft apartment debuted on 11 January 2016, with Bentley joined by guest hosts. Carina Waye joined the show as a new host on 22 February 2016.

The concluding segment of Couch Time returned to 6:30 pm on 13 March 2017; the block now airing from the original 4:00 pm until 6:30 pm timeslot. It remained in this slot until the final episode. It was announced in March 2017, that the series would be ending due to a "reallocation of resources". The last episode aired on 31 March 2017.

== Format ==
Couch Time airs on weekday afternoons and features a block classic sitcoms along with local Network Ten programs Neighbours and Family Feud (from its premiere in 2014 until being removed from simulcast in 2017). The show is an interstitial program, featuring two hosts who introduce the programs of the block while presenting linking segments on a couch in a loungeroom set. They also discuss television and pop culture news, including previews of other Network Ten programs, along with interviews, competitions and other entertaining segments. A prominent feature is commentary of Eleven's series Neighbours, along with interviews with the cast, occasional behind-the-scenes set visits, and previews of future episodes.

== Controversy ==
Over the years, segments by original hosts Hawkins and Davidson were criticised by viewers of Eleven and attracted negative commentary online.

In 2013, a community television presenter from Perth legally challenged Network Ten of trademark infringement for using the Couch Time title, with his similarly titled series The Couch airing since 2002. Ten later reached an agreement which allowed them to continue the Couch Time brand.
