= Deadly Earnest =

Australian horror television host

Ian Bannerman as the cadaverous host of Deadly Earnest's Aweful Movie (TEN-10 Sydney, circa 1967).

Deadly Earnest was a late-night horror host active on Australian television between 1959 and 1978. Originated as a live (pre-video machine) host of a horror film package for Perth's TVW-7 by 1959, the character was most active between 1966 and 1972 when adopted by the 0-10 Network. Broadcast weekly, Deadly Earnest's Aweful Movies featured mainly B-grade horror movies introduced by local actors with a tongue-in-cheek characterization. The program was renowned for screening low-budget B-grade (or worse) supernaturally themed cinema, even going so far as to present the Worst Movie of the Year on at least one occasion.

== History ==
The Deadly Earnest character was originated by TVW-7 Perth musical director Max Bostock. It is not known how long this version continued, but it was taken up by TEN Channel 10 in Sydney in 1966, with Ian Bannerman as the eponymous host. The program was evidently successful enough to spawn local versions on each of the TEN affiliate stations in Melbourne, Brisbane and Adelaide. These separate versions existed because, in this pre-satellite era, the capital-city TV stations of the ABC and the three commercial networks were all locally broadcast – the only TV networking at this time was accomplished via the coaxial cable that connected Sydney and Melbourne, and this was only used for selected programs, due to its cost and limited bandwidth.

Deadly Earnest was simultaneously portrayed by Bannerman in Sydney, Channel 0 floor manager Ralph Baker in Melbourne, future TV drama star Shane Porteous in Brisbane, and Hedley Cullen in Adelaide. Each of these local incarnations differed considerably from Bostock's original character, leading to some confusion amongst fans as to who was the 'real' Earnest in later years. Varying widely in appearance and personality, each version took a vaguely sardonic approach to the subject matter, frequently ridiculing whatever film he happened to be hosting. The show was popular with teenagers and university student audiences, who tuned in apparently as much for the commentaries as for the actual movies (which according to at least one observer were little short of atrocious).

== Character style ==
Ian Bannerman in particular was notable for his mordant wit, withering ad-libs and black humour parodies of contemporary advertisements. Billed as a 'Dead-Pan Ghoul', Bannerman's Earnest resembled an undead 1960s 'mod' complete with sideburns and horn-rimmed glasses. In addition to Bannerman's solo appearances, Deadly Earnest was sometimes accompanied by two 'ghoulish assistants' during commercial breaks – possibly members of Bannerman's sideline band, The Grave Situation. Although the character's occupation was never specified, the show's opening sequence suggested he was some kind of 'zombified' undertaker (as suggested by his wheeling a casket across the rooftop of the then newly constructed Channel 10 Television Centre at North Ryde and through the studio's darkened corridors).

== Featured films ==
While the majority of films featured on Deadly Earnest's Aweful Movies were stereotypical American 'schlock', a smattering of British, European and Japanese productions were thrown in every so often for good measure. Genre was not restricted exclusively to horror, but included sci-fi, suspense, mystery and even the odd matinee serial dredged up from the 1940s. The chief unifying element was the consistently poor quality of the material – the term "Aweful Movie" could often be applied in more than one sense – which was, evidently, part of the show's appeal.

== Actors portraying Deadly Earnest ==
- Ralph Baker (ATV-0 Melbourne)
- Ian Bannerman (TEN-10 Sydney)
- Roland Barnes (TVW-7 Perth)
- Hedley Cullen (SAS-10 Adelaide 1967–1974, 1975, 1978; TVW-7 Perth 1975)
- Shane Porteous (TVQ-0 Brisbane)

== Archival notes ==
Only a few fragments of film and video footage of the various Deadly Earnest incarnations have survived. Due to the very low budgets allotted to the Aweful Movies programs, and the limited availability and high cost of videotaping programs at that time, Aweful Movies was typically broadcast live and the shows were rarely, if ever, videotaped. Another issue that has affected preservation is that, even when programs of the period that were regularly videotaped for repeat or distribution (e.g. pop programs like The Go!! Show or Uptight), Australian TV stations typically later erased or disposed of the vast majority of this material.

Although there is no known surviving footage of Ian Bannerman's Aweful Movies broadcasts, there is a brief (53-second) fragment of silent colour 8mm film footage on YouTube, showing Bannerman and two guest musicians (possibly his backing band The Grave Situation) in full costume and makeup. This is a home movie belonging to one of the guests filmed on 4 March 1969 at the Channel Ten studios in Sydney. There is also a surviving 16mm telecine monochrome film of Bannerman, in character as Deadly Earnest, on the Aweful Movies set, making a guest appearance on the Barry Crocker variety series Say It With Music ca. 1968 – this was possibly a Halloween edition of the series, and features Crocker, Bannerman, and a group of supporting singers and dancers, performing a sequence of lighthearted horror-themed musical numbers. Bannerman also recorded an LP, Rave in Peace, released on the RCA Camden label in 1969, which featured ten original tracks co-written by Bannerman and musician John Brindle, including a song celebrating Bannerman's regular sponsor, "Cec Cook's Magic Shop". After Aweful Movies, Bannerman is reported to have worked for the ABC as a program assessor, but is since thought to have died, possibly some time in the 1980s.

Hedley Cullen died in 1994 and no footage was known to exist of him as Deadly Earnest until SAS-7 (formerly SAS-10) celebrated its 40th anniversary in 2005, when three clips were discovered while researching a television special. One clip of Baker introducing a movie exists, and in mid-2010 footage of him in character was recovered from a current affairs show held by the National Film and Sound Archive. No footage is known to exist of Shane Porteous' version of Deadly Earnest or his successor in 1968, Professor MacCarb as played by John Dommett. However, in mid-2016 audio recordings of three introductions were identified on YouTube. A Facebook group has been set up devoted to the hosts, and is associated with some new research.
