= Crocamole =

- Genre: Preschool
- Starring: Callan Warner; Emily Dickson; Jack Kelly
- Country of origin: Australia
- Original language: English
- No. of series: 3
- No. of episodes: 420

Production
- Production locations: Brisbane, Queensland
- Running time: 30 minutes

Original release
- Network: 10 Peach
- Release: 15 January 2016 – 25 June 2019

Related
- Wurrawhy

Crocamole is an Australian television series for preschoolers which first aired on 10 Peach on 15 January 2016. The series is food based and is designed as a cooking show for young children. Filmed in Brisbane, it stars Emily Dickson as Molly, a magical rainbow sprite, and Callan Warner as Truffle, an inventor chef, joined by a puppet crocodile named Croc, played by Jack Kelly.

== Cast ==
- Callan Warner as Truffle
- Emily Dickson as Molly
- Jack Kelly as Croc

== Format ==
Like its predecessors, Crocamole is aimed at preschoolers and features a central theme of exploring and discovering the world. Set in a kitchen, Crocamole is designed as a creative cooking show for children which educates the audience on healthy eating. The three presenters use food to explore a theme for each episode, while also singing various songs based on the day's theme, and playing games.

Other features of each episode include Kitchen Detectives, which involves searching for kitchen items beginning with a certain letter, Tiny Tales, which are daily stories, and opening mail from viewers. Also featured are three puppet strawberry characters called the Strawberry Sisters.

The series conveys the message that "across all cultures, the kitchen is the beating heart of every household. It is where meals are created and prepared with care and love to nourish children and families." The educational focus of the show addresses nutrition, numeracy, literacy, and gross and fine motor skills.

== Series overview ==
Series	Episodes	Originally released	
Series	Episodes	First released	Last released
1	160	15 January 2016	9 February 2017
2	160	10 February 2017	27 June 2018
3	100	6 February 2019	25 June 2019

Repeats of the series aired on 10 Shake from 28 September 2020 to 29 January 2021.

== See also ==
- List of Australian television series
