= For Real (TV series) =

Australien Comedy tv channel for kids and teenagers

For Real! is an Australian comedy television program for children and teenagers which first screened on 10 Shake on 17 October 2020.

Taylor, Maddie, Jet, Lucas and George gather every afternoon in a ramshackle makeshift studio space to produce and record their YouTube show. They try to stay on task and get their show out before they have to be at training, do homework and combat their teen social pressures. Their greatest obstacle is their local Mayor, who creates havoc within the community and motivates the teens to get involved and stand up for what they believe. The group becomes community activists as a result of their interaction with the Mayor.

== Cast ==
- Madison Russo as George
- Harrison Aston as Jet
- Hunter Stanford as Lucas
- Melody Kiptoo as Maddie
- El Smith as Taylor
- Penny Greenhalgh as Mayor Nesbitt

== Production ==
The 37 part series was created by Monica O’Brien for Ambience Entertainment. It was written by Joel Slack-Smith, Penny Greenhalgh, Amy Stewart, Melissa Lee Speyer, Daniel Oates, Monica O'Brien, John Unwin, Hannah Fitzpatrick, Stephen Abbott and Warren Coleman. The series is directed by Keaton Stewart, Joel Slack–Smith and Monica O'Brien with Sue Keating as Series Producers.
