= 10 daily =

Australian media news website

- Website type: Media news
- Dissolved: 22 May 2020; 6 years ago
- Owner: Ten Network Holdings
- Editor: Chris Harrison
- Commercial: Yes
- Registration: Free
- Launched: 14 May 2018; 8 years ago
- Current status: Closed

10 daily was a news and entertainment website. Part of the Ten Network Holdings, it was launched in May 2018 as Ten daily, and rebranded as 10 daily that October as part of an overall rebranding of the network. The site had 1.04 million visitors in September 2018. 10 daily created content aimed at the 18 to 39-year-old demographic; as of May 2019, the majority of visitors were between 18 and 44, female, and accessing the website on mobile devices. On their first anniversary 10 daily launched a new tagline, "news with benefits".

The 10 daily website closed on 22 May 2020, though some content was transferred to 10 Play and social media accounts.
