= Wurrawhy =

Australian preschool TV show

- Genre: Pre-school
- Starring: Michael Balk; Lauren Porter
- Country of origin: Australia
- Original language: English
- No. of seasons: 5
- No. of episodes: 225

Production
- Production locations: Brisbane, Queensland
- Running time: 30 minutes

Original release
- Network: Network Ten (2011–2013); Eleven (2013–2016)
- Release: 31 January 2011 – 14 January 2016

Related
- Puzzle Play; Crocamole

Wurrawhy is an Australian pre-school themed television series for young children. It premiered on Network Ten on 31 January 2011, and it later aired on Eleven and aired Monday to Friday from 9:30 am to 10:00 am and originally aired from 8:30 am to 9:00 am, then from 11:30 am to 12:00 pm, then back to 8:30 am to 9:00 am, then with Breakfast's cancellation in November 2012, it aired from 7:00 am to 7:30 am and on 4 November 2013, the show moved to Eleven at 9:30 to 10 am, to accommodate new morning shows such as Studio 10, and its last episode was on 14 January 2016 after 5 years to make room for a new pre-school series called Crocamole.

The main character is Wubbleyoo, a computer mouse that has come to life who is inquisitive and eager. With his friend Lauren and KB the cat, they are eager to explore the world around them. A computer is used for the characters to explore the theme of each episode with icons representing "Who, What, When, Where and Why".

== Cast ==
- Michael Balk as Wubbleyoo
- Lauren Porter
- Lucy Flook as KB The Cat

== See also ==
- List of Australian television series
