= Totally Wild =

Australian children's television series

- Totally Wild logo used from 2012 to 2016
- Genre: Children's television Lifestyle
- Presented by: Stacey Thomson
- Country of origin: Australia
- Original language: English
- No. of seasons: 27
- No. of episodes: 4,596

Production
- Production locations: Brisbane, Queensland
- Running time: 30 minutes (including commercials)

Original release
- Network: Network 10 (1992–2013); 10 Peach (2013–2020); 10 Shake (2020–2021)
- Release: 12 July 1992 – 27 June 2021

Totally Wild is an Australian children's television series that premiered on Network 10 on 12 July 1992. The series aired on 10 Peach (formerly Eleven) from 2013 to 2020, and 10 Shake from 2020 to 2021. It had a current affairs program format, and did stories on topics such as Australia's native flora and fauna, action sports, the environment, science, and technology. The show was broadcast across many countries.

Totally Wild was one of Australia's longest running children's programs and Australia's longest running C classified children's program. It celebrated its 25th anniversary on air on 22 July 2017. Original presenter Trudy Smith moved onto Agro’s Cartoon Connection while Ranger Stacey Thomson remained with the program for its entire run.

On 3 February 2021, 10 announced that they had cancelled the show after 27 seasons, while the remaining episodes would continue to air. The final episode aired on 27 June 2021.

== Presenters ==
=== Notable presenters and guests ===
- Trudy Smith
- Tim Bailey
- Jasmin Geisel
- Angela Brown
- Tim Moore (Ranger Tim)
- Jesse Baird
- Emily Barker
- Scott Bidmead
- Shae Brewster
- Hayley Chapman
- Wesley Dening
- Emily Dickson
- Natalie Hunter
- Jack Kelly
- Sami Lukis
- Brooke Marsden
- Craig McMahon
- Kellyn Morris
- Melanie Symons
- Stacey Thomson (Ranger Stacey)
- Leela Varghese
- Dr. Katrina Warren
- Courtney Wilkie
- Hayley Wilson
- Jack Yabsley
- Sam Harvey
- Craig Horner

== Series overview ==
Series	Episodes	Originally released	
Series	Episodes	First released	Last released
1	TBA	12 July 1992	TBA
2	TBA	1993	TBA
3	TBA	1994	TBA
4	TBA	1995	TBA
5	TBA	1996	TBA
6	TBA	1997	TBA
7	TBA	1998	TBA
8	180	1999	TBA
9	180	2000	TBA
10	180	2001	TBA
11	180	2002	TBA
12	180	2003	TBA
13	180	2004	TBA
14	180	2005	TBA
15	180	2006	TBA
16	180	2007	TBA
17	180	2008	TBA
18	180	2009	TBA
19	180	2010	TBA
20	180	2011	TBA
21	180	2 December 2012	19 April 2014
22	180	21 April 2014	20 July 2015
23	180	21 July 2015	10 September 2016
24	180	13 September 2016	20 January 2018
25	171	23 January 2018	22 September 2019
26	180	23 September 2019	12 December 2020
27	53	13 December 2020	27 June 2021

=== Specials ===
- Totally Wild Weekend (1993)
- Totally Australia (1997)
- Totally Wild Rescue (1998)
- Totally Wild: Antarctica Special (2007)

== Broadcast history ==
Totally Wild logo used from 2003 to 2012

- 12 July 1992 – 1996, the show aired on weekdays at 4.30pm (and on the occasional weekend morning slot at various times).
- 1996 – December 2008, the show aired on Monday to Wednesday and Occasionally on Friday at 4pm (and on the occasional weekend morning slot at various times).
- 6 January 2009 – 1 January 2010, it aired on Tuesday to Fridays at 7.30am, Saturdays at 9am, and on Sundays at 7am.
- 4 January 2010 – 26 February 2012, it aired on Monday to Wednesday and on Fridays at 8am, and on Sundays at 7.00am.
- 27 February 2012 – 30 October 2013, it aired on Monday to Wednesday at 4pm repeats at 7am, Saturdays at 8.30am and a double episode on Sundays at 7.00am.
- 4 November 2013 – 26 September 2020, the series aired on 10 Peach (formerly Eleven) on Monday to Wednesday at 8am and repeats Saturdays at 8.30am. The program's change in network was due to launch of Wake Up and Studio 10.
- 27 September 2020 – 4 April 2021, the series aired on 10 Shake, with new episodes on Saturday and Sunday at 11.30am.
- 10 April 2021 – 27 June 2021, the series aired on 10 Shake, with new episodes on Saturday and Sunday at 6.00am.

== Awards and nominations ==
=== APRA Music Awards ===
Year	Nominated works	Award	Result	Lost to	Ref
1994	"Totally Wild"	Children's Composition of the Year	Nominated	The Wiggles - "Hot Potato"	

=== Logie Awards ===
Year	Nominated works	Award	Result	Lost to
2003	Totally Wild	Most Outstanding Children's Program	Nominated	Tracey McBean
2008	Totally Wild: Antarctica Special	Most Outstanding Children's Program	Nominated	Lockie Leonard
2013	Totally Wild	Most Outstanding Children's Program	Nominated	Dance Academy

== See also ==
- List of longest-running Australian television series
- List of Australian television series
