= Network Ten Pty Limited =

Australian media company

Network Ten Pty Ltd

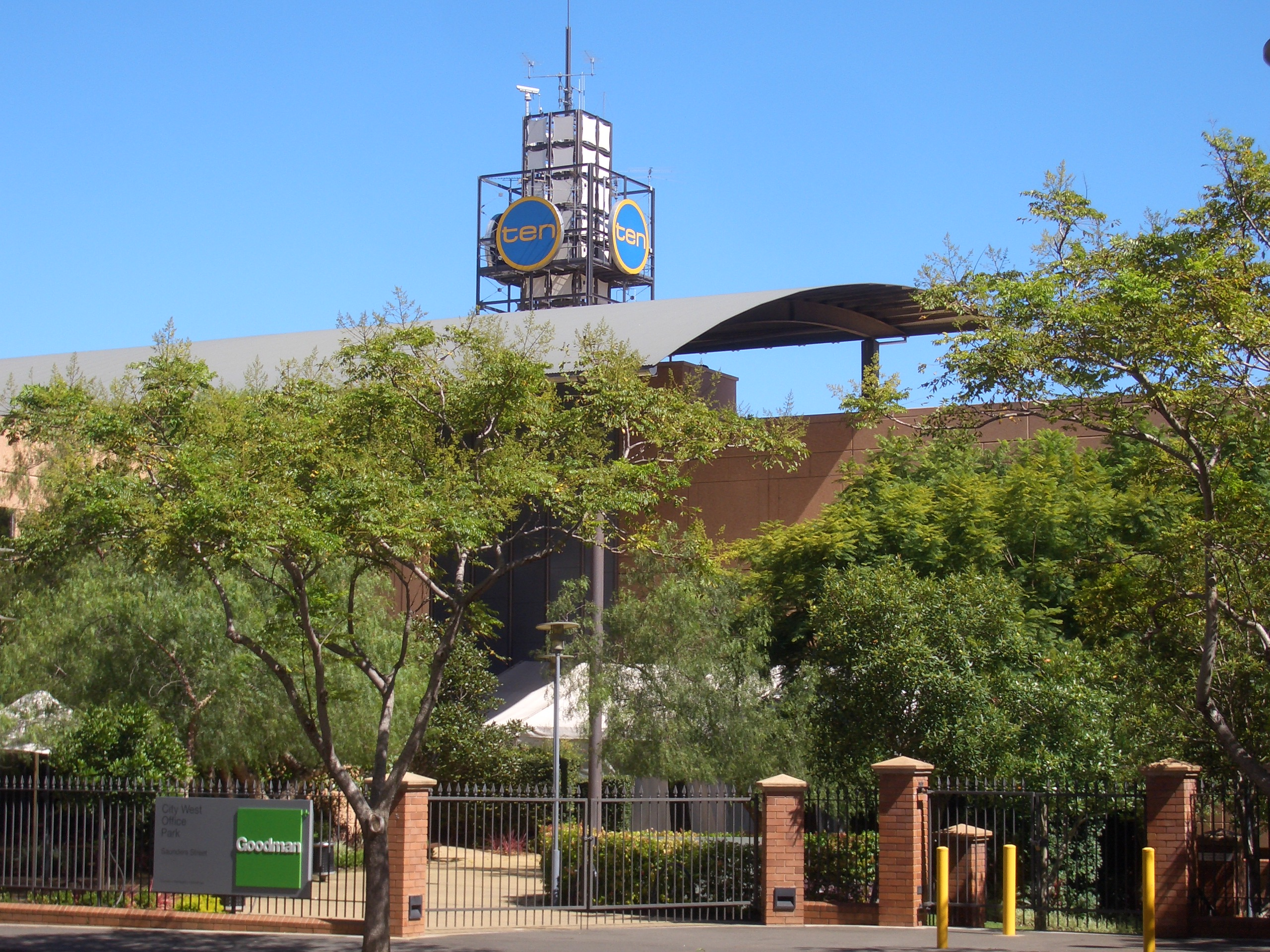
- Trade name: Paramount Australia & New Zealand
- Formerly: Ten Network Holdings Limited (1998–2020); ViacomCBS Australia & New Zealand (2020–2022)
- Type: Subsidiary
- Traded as: ASX: TEN (former)
- Industry: Media
- Predecessor: Ten Group Limited
- Founded: 31 March 1998; 28 years ago
- Headquarters: 1 Saunders Street, Pyrmont, New South Wales, Australia
- Key people: Beverley McGarvey (CEO and president); David Gordon (chairman)
- Products: Television
- Number of employees: 1,000+
- Parent: Skydance Asia-Pacific
- Website: www.paramountanz.com.au

Network Ten Pty Ltd, doing business as Paramount Australia & New Zealand, is a major Australian media company. Headquartered in Pyrmont, New South Wales, its major asset is Network 10, a free-to-air television network. Formerly a public company listed on the Australian Securities Exchange, it became a subsidiary of Paramount Networks UK & Australia in December 2019, before subsequently becoming part of Skydance Asia-Pacific, Middle East, and North Africa, following the formation of Skydance Corporation, in October 2026.

== Assets ==
While originally focusing on running a television network, 10 has recently diversified into a range of other media areas over the past decade. Below are some of the businesses it has run, or is involved with:

- Network 10 is an Australian commercial free-to-air television primary channel
  - Sydney, Northern NSW & Gold Coast, Southern NSW & ACT
  - Melbourne and Regional Victoria
  - Brisbane and Regional Queensland
  - Adelaide
  - Perth
- 10 Drama is an Australian free-to-air digital television multichannel dramatic programming aimed towards viewers over 40.
- 10 Comedy is an Australian free-to-air digital television multichannel featuring comedy, sitcoms and some drama programs.
- Nickelodeon is an Australian free-to-air digital television multichannel which includes a mix of shows for people under 40.
- Gecko is an Australian free-to-air datacasting channel
- 10 is a video on demand, catch-up TV service which carries the main and multichannels of Network 10.
- Multi Channel Network (25%)

== History ==
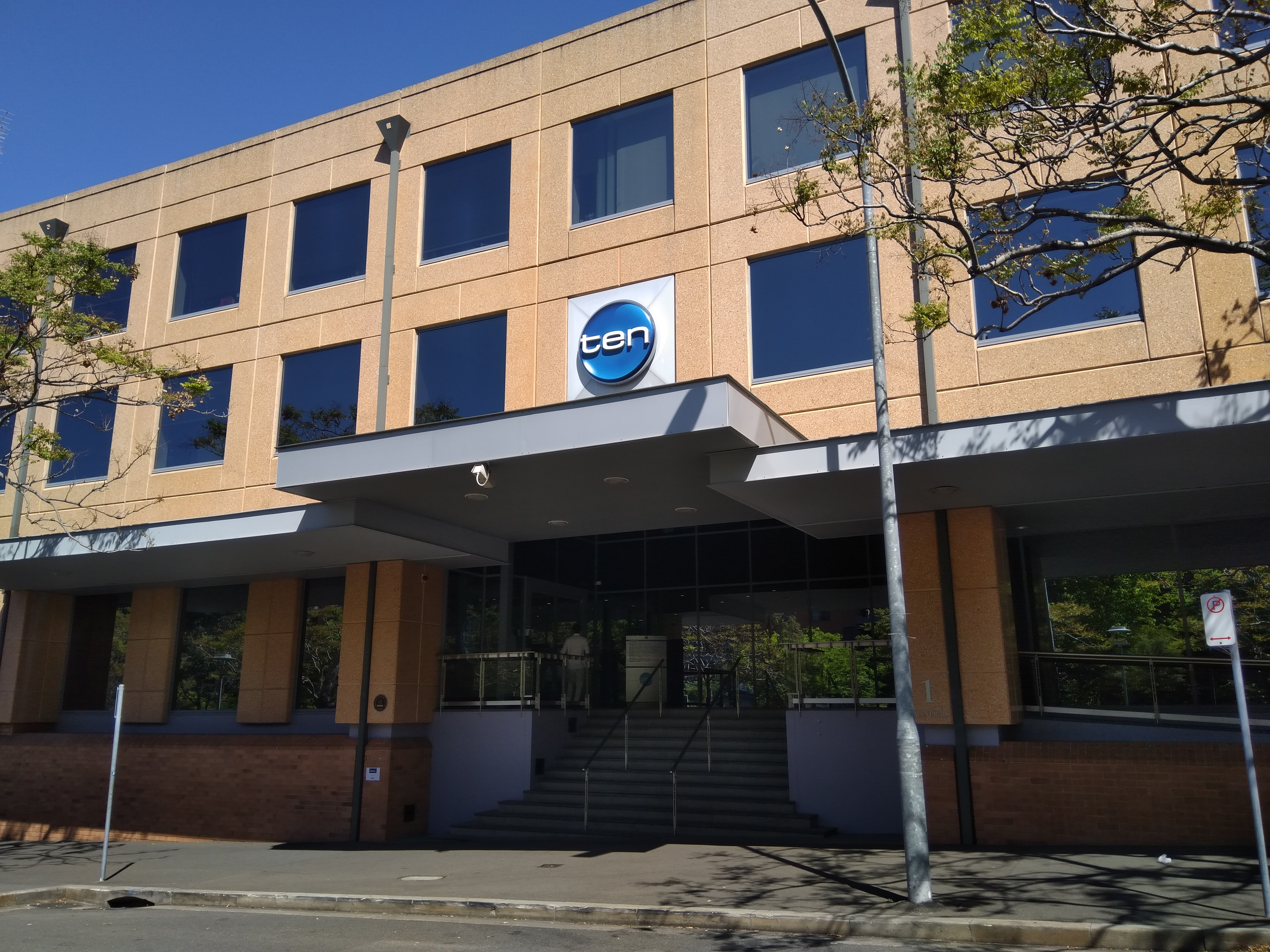
Ten's corporate headquarters in Pyrmont, Sydney

=== Pre-1998 ===
In April 1987, News Corporation finalised an $842 million deal to sell its Network Ten Sydney and Melbourne stations to NRN and GWN7 owner Northern Star Holdings, an associate of Frank Lowy's Westfield Capital Corporation. The Ten Adelaide, Perth and Canberra stations were then purchased in August 1987 from Kerry Stokes.

In September 1989, following nine months of discussions, Westfield finally got its exit out of television by selling its shareholding of Northern Star Holdings to Broadcom and a consortium of bankers for an eye-watering $450 million loss. Signalling the cash flows problems incurred by the network at the time, MCA took the company to court over unpaid program supply fees. Broadcom then onsold the Adelaide, Perth and Canberra stations to Charles Curran's Capital Television Holdings for $185 million. Broadcom then anticipated that through cutbacks in programming and operational costs, it would be able to achieve profitability by the end of financial year 1991/92.

Ernst & Young receivers were subsequently appointed to take over Northern Star in September 1990. The network was then placed into liquidation by the New South Wales Rugby League in May 1991. In late 1991, Westpac took control of the East Coast capital city stations in a $240 million sale.

On 30 December 1992, Network Ten was sold by the bank to Oltec Limited. Controlled by Canadian media company CanWest, minority shareholders included TNQ, Jack Cowin, John Singleton and Liebler Media. CanWest also had a minority shareholding in New Zealand broadcaster TV3 at this time. Oltec changed its name to the Ten Group Limited in April 1993.

In November 1993, Ten Group Limited purchased a 50% shareholding in Capital Television Holdings. In 1995, controlling shareholder Curran sold the Canberra station to Southern Cross Broadcasting after initial court action by Ten Group Limited to stop the transaction in an effort to protect their existing program supply agreement which followed court action by Capital alleging that CanWest had breached legislation on foreign ownership restrictions.

Due to foreign ownership restrictions, CanWest was restricted in the amount of Ten that it could own. In June 1994, TNQ was recorded with the largest voting stake in Ten Group Limited with 40%, while CanWest had 15% and AMP Limited 5%.

=== Establishment and relationship with The Ten Group ===
Ten Network Holdings (TNH) was established in 1998, launched as a public company on the ASX holding the Network Ten assets. It allowed shareholders to invest in The Ten Group Pty Ltd, the owner of the Ten television network. TNH had a 79% shareholding in The Ten Group, representing a 39% economic interest in the group. Canwest had a 58% economic interest in The Ten Group and was the Group's other major owner. In June 2007, Canwest decided to convert its stake in The Ten Group into shares in Ten Network Holdings, giving it a 56% shareholding in TNH. This saw TNH take 99% ownership of The Ten Group and become the central company in Ten's corporate structure. In February 2008, the other shareholders in The Ten Group exchanged their shares in that company for shares in TNH, giving TNH 100% ownership of The Ten Group.

=== Canwest Sale ===
On 24 September 2009, Canwest announced that it was selling its 50.1% stake in Ten Network Holdings for A$680 million (following the 2006 concentration/restriction on Australian media ownership), in order to pay down its significant debt, although it was not enough to save the former parent, which went out of business the next year.

=== James Packer share purchase ===
During October 2010, James Packer through Consolidated Press Holdings, bought an 18% shareholding. Half of this was then bought from Packer by Lachlan Murdoch; the two are listed as joint owners of 17.88% of the company

On 26 November 2010, mining magnate and Australia's wealthiest woman, Gina Rinehart was appointed a position of the board after purchasing 10% of the company.

Speculation surrounds the future of the Packer investment as upcoming changes to sport broadcast regulation and Ten's low share price in a slowly resurgent market are seen as possible drivers for the current stake.

On 23 February 2011, the board of Ten Network Holdings terminated the contract of CEO Grant Blackley. Lachlan Murdoch was appointed acting CEO. In February 2012, Murdoch was appointed chairman by the board, replacing Brian Long who became deputy chairman, with James Warburton as the company's CEO.

On 26 March 2014, Hamish McLennan was appointed Executive Chairman after becoming chief executive officer and managing director of the company in March 2013 replacing James Warburton. Lachlan Murdoch retired as chairman and a Director to join News Corp and 21st Century Fox as Non-Executive Co-chairman.

On 27 July 2015, Paul Anderson was appointed chief executive officer, and Non-Executive Director David Gordon was appointed chairman after Hamish McLennan stepped down from both roles.

On 11 March 2020, Paul Anderson stepped down from his position and he was not directly replaced with Beverley McGarvey promoted to become Chief Content Officer and Executive Vice President across Ten and ViacomCBS Australia & NZ.

=== Foxtel takeover bid ===
In 2014, News Corp/Telstra-owned Foxtel and U.S. cable company Discovery Communications made a joint-venture to take a bid on Ten. Other U.S.-based companies and investment firms, such as Anchorage Capital Group and Saban Capital Group, were also on the bidding list. However, this was opposed by WIN Corporation owner and Ten shareholder Bruce Gordon stating that Ten would remain in the Australian hands.

On 15 June 2015, Foxtel officially agreed to buyout 15% shares in Ten Network Holdings, pending the approval from the Australian Competition & Consumer Commission. Prior to the acquisition, Discovery backed out from bidding partnership with Foxtel.

There were numerous reports stated that Foxtel will push-through the 15% acquisition of Ten once the Australian government will abolish the restriction on cross-media ownership.

=== 2017 financial turmoil ===
Announcing an AU$232 million half-year loss in 2017, Ten Network Holdings warned that there was "significant doubt on the group's ability to continue" and their future hinged on an extension or renewal of an AU$200 million debt guarantee by three of its largest shareholders Lachlan Murdoch, Bruce Gordon and James Packer which expires on 23 December 2017. In June 2017, Murdoch, Gordon and Packer withdrew support for a $250 million guaranteed loan that would remedy the expiring $200 million debt guarantee. In response, Ten requested its shares on the Australian Securities Exchange be placed in a 48-hour trading halt while it assessed its options concerning receivership. On 14 June 2017, Ten went into voluntary administration.

=== Purchase by CBS ===
Upon the news of receivership, Ten's largest shareholders (Murdoch and Gordon) attempted to merge their assets to save Network 10. The Australian Competition & Consumer Commission even stated that they would not oppose the said merger bid, which would have resulted in both shareholders enjoying a 50% stake in the network.

However, on 28 August 2017, Ten's administrators announced that the U.S. media company CBS Corporation (which has a 33% share in channel Eleven) had entered into a binding agreement to purchase the company for $123 million, subject to approval of the Foreign Investment Review Board. CBS refinanced Ten's existing debt including guarantor fees to billionaire shareholders James Packer, Lachlan Murdoch and Bruce Gordon, and existing loans from the Commonwealth Bank. As a result, once the deal were to be approved, CBS would take over in full with current shareholders losing their shares and its value.

Gordon and Murdoch, whose joint bid for the company had not been accepted, went to the Supreme Court of New South Wales in an effort to delay CBS's takeover of Ten. This delayed the administrator's meeting with creditors until 12 September. At the meeting, creditors overwhelmingly voted in support of CBS' bid, citing concerns over Murdoch's management of Ten over the past years and talk of mass job cuts in the news department under Murdoch ownership. On 10 November 2017, the Supreme Court approved the purchase.

On 16 November 2017 the purchase by CBS was completed and shares were transferred to CBS Network 10 BV, a company registered in the Netherlands. The company became a division of CBS Studios International.

The company launched the news, entertainment and lifestyle website 10 daily in May 2018. The site was conceived while Ten was an independent company and was intended to launch in September 2017. The site was shut down on 22 May 2020.

On 31 October 2018, the network unveiled a new logo, replacing the "ten" wordmark used since 1991 with a stylised circle 10, and the network now referred to in text as "Network 10". The new brand is used across all of Network 10's platforms and services, and was intended to reflect the broadcaster's positioning as an "adventurous alternative" with a "sense of fun". 10 also relaunched its multichannels Eleven and One as 10 Peach and 10 Boss (now 10 Bold), with Bold focusing on dramatic programming and targeting an older adult audience, and Peach continuing to be targeted towards young adults. In December 2018, the network launched 10 All Access, a localised version of the American streaming service CBS All Access with a selection of ad-free programming from both CBS and Network 10. The service was rebranded as Paramount+ on 11 August 2021.

=== CBS merger with Viacom ===
In December 2019, the parent company CBS Corporation re-merged with Viacom, forming ViacomCBS (later renamed Paramount) and making Network 10 a sister to Viacom channels in Australia (MTV, Nickelodeon etc.) as well as international networks such as Channel 5 in the United Kingdom.

In July 2020, it was announced that a new multichannel called 10 Shake would launch in September 2020, The channel would target an under 40s audience during prime time, drawing upon "edgy" content which became available throughout the ViacomCBS merger (including television brands from Nickelodeon, MTV and Comedy Central). The breakdown for the channel is children's programming before 6pm and "edgy" content for under-40 viewers at night. 10 Shake rebranded as Nickelodeon in August 2023.

On 18 March 2024, it was announced that Beverley McGarvey had been appointed president and CEO of Network 10, head of streaming and regional lead for Australia and New Zealand.

In August 2025, the company became part of Paramount, a Skydance Corporation, following the completion of the merger between Paramount Global and Skydance Media.
