= Nickelodeon (Australian TV channel) =

Australian free-to-air digital television channel

Nickelodeon Australia
- Logo used since 2023
- Type: Free-to-air television network
- Country: Australia
- Broadcast area: Sydney, Melbourne, Brisbane, Adelaide, Perth, Regional QLD, Southern NSW & ACT, Regional VIC, Tasmania
- Network: Network 10

Programming
- Language: English
- Picture format: 576i (SDTV) 16:9

Ownership
- Owner: Warner Bros. Discovery Asia-Pacific (Skydance Corporation)
- Parent: Network Ten Pty Limited; Nickelodeon Group
- Sister channels: Channel 10; 10 HD; 10 Comedy; 10 Drama; You.tv; Gecko TV

History
- Launched: 27 September 2020; 6 years ago
- Replaced: Nickelodeon (pay TV) (programming)
- Former names: 10 Shake (2020–23)

Links
- Website: https://www.nick.com.au

Availability

Terrestrial
- Freeview 10 metro (virtual): 13
- Freeview 10 regional (virtual): 54

Streaming media
- 10

Nickelodeon is an Australian free-to-air digital television multichannel owned by Warner Bros. Discovery Asia-Pacific , via Ten Network Holdings.

It originally launched as 10 Shake on 27 September 2020, as Network 10's third multichannel. As 10 Shake, the network primarily broadcast children's programmes in the daytime hours (including Nickelodeon library content), and programmes targeting a young adult audience in the evening and prime time hours (primarily sourced from CBS, Comedy Central and MTV). After rebranding as Nickelodeon, the network further dayparted its schedule into blocks under the Nick Jr., Nickelodeon, and Nick at Nite brands.

== History ==
=== 10 Shake (2020–2023) ===
During a showcase to advertisers in May 2020, Beverley McGarvey, the chief content officer and executive vice president of ViacomCBS Networks UK & Australia, revealed that the broadcaster planned to launch a new digital channel targeting viewers under 50 later in the year.

On 13 July 2020, it was announced that 10 Shake would launch in September. The network would carry children's programmes (drawing primarily television series from Nickelodeon brands), while evening and prime time hours would feature "edgy" series and films targeting young adults under 40, including programmes from Comedy Central and MTV, and other imported programmes such as The Late Late Show with James Corden.

It was confirmed on 13 September 2020 that 10 Shake would launch on 27 September in metropolitan markets. On 25 June 2021, 10 immediately signed for a re-affiliation deal with SCA that would launch 10 Shake in regional markets from 1 July 2021. 10 Shake launched on Foxtel on 14 September 2022.

=== Nickelodeon (2023–present) ===
On 22 June 2023, it was announced that 10 Shake would rebrand as Nickelodeon on 1 August. Under its new format, the channel would add Nickelodeon and Nick Jr. programming during the daytime hours, while the prime time lineup of young adult programmes were rebranded as Nick at Nite. This resulted in the end of the Nickelodeon channel broadcasting on Foxtel in Australia, whilst continuing to be provided on Fetch TV and Sky in New Zealand.

On 1 November 2025, the pay-TV version of the channel was shut down on Fetch in Australia, but the free-to-air channel will continue to operate. The pay-TV channel would shut down in New Zealand on 2 December 2025.

== Programming ==
Prior to the rebrand, 10 Shake featured a mix of repeated shows from their slate of output deals and shows that made their debut on Australian free-to-air television. Most of its programming was sourced from the library of Network 10's parent company Paramount and its television brands from CBS, MTV, Nickelodeon and Comedy Central.

10 Shake aired local Australian children's programming, including Totally Wild, Crocamole and other C-classified dramas. Also locally produced for the network was short-form series Shake Takes which was inspired by social media influencers and supported by integration from sponsors such as VTech, Toyworld, Spin Master and The Accent Group. This was later replaced by Nick News before the channel was rebranded to Nickelodeon.

The network also has ongoing content new and classic film and television brands from Paramount Pictures, Nickelodeon Movies, MTV Entertainment Studios, Paramount Animation, DreamWorks Pictures, Miramax and Paramount Players.

=== Current programming ===
==== Animation (Nick At Nite) ====
- Aaahh!!! Real Monsters (2023–present)
- The Angry Beavers (2023–present)
- Avatar: The Last Airbender (2024–present)
- CatDog (2023–present)
- Danny Phantom (2024–present)
- The Fairly OddParents (2024–present)
- Hey Arnold! (2024–present)
- Invader Zim (2024–present)
- The Ren & Stimpy Show (2023–present)
- Rocket Power (2024–present)
- Rocko's Modern Life (2023–present)
- Teenage Mutant Ninja Turtles (1987 series) (2020–21, 2023–present)

==== Children's ====
- 100 Things to Do Before High School (2024–present)
- The Barbarian and the Troll (2024–present)
- Bella and the Bulldogs (2023–present)
- The Casagrandes (2023–present)
- Danger Force (2023–present)
- Double Dare (2023–present)
- The Fairly OddParents: A New Wish (2025–present)
- Henry Danger (2020–23, 2025–present)
- Kamp Koral: SpongeBob's Under Years (2024–present)
- The Legend of Korra (2024–present)
- The Loud House (2020–present)
- Max & the Midknights (2025–present)
- Monster High (2023–present)
- The Patrick Star Show (2024–present)
- Pig Goat Banana Cricket (2024–present)
- The Really Loud House (2024–present)
- Rock Island Mysteries (2022–present)
- Rock Paper Scissors (2024–present)
- School of Rock (2024–present)
- Sharkdog (2025–present)
- Side Hustle (2023–present)
- The Smurfs (2021 series) (2023–present)
- Sonic Prime (2024–present)
- SpongeBob SquarePants (2020–present)
- Tales of the Teenage Mutant Ninja Turtles (2025–present)
- Teenage Mutant Ninja Turtles (2012 series) (2024–present)
- The Thundermans (2020–present)
- The Thundermans: Undercover (2025–present)
- The Twisted Timeline of Sammy & Raj (2024–present)
- Tyler Perry's Young Dylan (2023–present)
- Zokie of Planet Ruby (2024–present)

==== Preschool ====
- Baby Shark's Big Show! (2022–present)
- Blaze and the Monster Machines (2020–present)
- Blue's Clues & You! (2020–present)
- Bubble Guppies (2020–present)
- The Creature Cases (2025–present)
- Dora (2024–present)
- Gabby's Dollhouse (2024–present)
- Garden Academy (2024–present)
- Hamsters of Hamsterdale (2025–present)
- Ni Hao, Kai-Lan (2024–present)
- Paw Patrol (2020–present)
- Ready Set Dance (2020–present)
- Rubble & Crew (2024–present)
- Ryan's Mystery Playdate (2021–present)
- Santiago of the Seas (2022–present)
- Shimmer and Shine (2020–present)
- The Tiny Chef Show (2024–present)
- Top Wing (2020–22, 2024–present)

==== Light entertainment ====
- The Cheap Seats (2022–present)
- Gogglebox Australia (2021–present)
- Gogglebox UK (2021–present)
- The Graham Norton Show (2020–present)
- Have You Been Paying Attention? (2020–present)
- Impractical Jokers (2024–present)
- Just for Laughs Australia (2020–present)
- Taskmaster Australia (2024–present)
- Ridiculousness (2026-present)

==== Award shows ====
- Nickelodeon Kids' Choice Awards

=== Former programming ===
==== Adult animation ====
- BoJack Horseman (2020–23)
- The Cleveland Show (2020–21)
- South Park (2020–23)

==== Children's ====
- Big Time Rush (2020–21, 2023–24)
- Breadwinners (2020–22)
- Bunsen Is a Beast (2021–23)
- The Bureau of Magical Things (2021–22)
- Dive Club (2021–23)
- For Real! (2020)
- Game Shakers (2021–23)
- Harvey Beaks (2020–21)
- The Haunted Hathaways (2021–22)
- How to Rock (2021–22)
- Hunter Street (2020)
- I Am Frankie (2021)
- iCarly (2020–24)
- It's Pony (2023)
- Middlemost Post (2023)
- Nicky, Ricky, Dicky & Dawn (2020–23)
- Nick News (2022–23)
- Sam & Cat (2020–22, 2024)
- Sanjay and Craig (2020–23)
- Shake Takes (2020–22)
- Star Trek: Prodigy (2022–23)
- Totally Wild (2020–21)
- T.U.F.F. Puppy (2022)
- Victorious (2020–24)
- WITS Academy (2021)

==== Preschool ====
- Abby Hatcher (2021–23)
- Butterbean's Café (2020–23)
- Calvin & Kaison's Play Power! (2022)
- Corn & Peg (2021–23)
- Crocamole (2020–21)
- Deer Squad (2023)
- Dora and Friends: Into the City! (2021–23)
- Dora the Explorer (2020–23)
- Fresh Beat Band of Spies (2020–21)
- Team Umizoomi (2020–23)
- Transformers: Rescue Bots (2021)

==== Comedy ====
- The Big Bang Theory (2025)
- Comedy Central Roast
- Drunk History USA (2020)
- Frasier (2024–2025)
- Friends (2023–2025)
- Ghosts (2024–2025)
- Inside Amy Schumer
- The Middle (2021–2025)
- Mom (2023–2025)
- The Neighborhood (2024–2025)
- The Office (2021–23)
- Ridiculousness
- Roast Battle
- Sabrina the Teenage Witch (2020–21)
- Tosh.0
- Workaholics (2023)
- Two and a Half Men (2025)

==== Light entertainment ====
- The Daily Show with Trevor Noah (2020)
- Hughesy, We Have a Problem (2021)
- The Late Late Show with James Corden (2020–23)
- Shaun Micallef's Brain Eisteddfod (2022)
- Thank God You're Here (2023–24)
- Ultimate Classroom (2022)

==== Reality ====
- The Bachelorette Australia (2020)
- Catfish: The TV Show
- The Challenge: Australia (2022)
- The Charlotte Show
- Ex on the Beach UK
- Fear Factor
- Hunted Australia (2022)
- Junior MasterChef Australia (2020)
- Just Tattoo of Us
- Lip Sync Battle
- The Masked Singer Australia (2020–23)
- The Masked Singer USA (2020–21)
- Pimp My Ride
- Teen Mom Australia (2020)
- Teen Mom USA (2020–21)
- Total Wipeout (2021–22)

==== Award shows ====
- MTV Video Music Awards
- MTV Europe Music Awards

== Availability ==
Nickelodeon is available on channel 13 in 576i standard definition from the network's five metropolitan owned-and-operated stations, TEN Sydney, ATV Melbourne, TVQ Brisbane, ADS Adelaide, and NEW Perth, and channel 54 on its regional owned and operated stations, TNQ Regional QLD, CTC Southern NSW/ACT, GLV/BCV Regional VIC, and TDT Tasmania (jointly owned station by WIN Corporation and Seven Media Group).

== Logo and identity history ==
27 September 2020 – 31 July 2023

1 August 2023 – present

=== Identity history ===
- 2020–2023: Shake It Up!
- 2023–present: We Make Fun
