= 10 Comedy =

Australian TV channel

- Logo used since 2025
- Country: Australia
- Broadcast area: Sydney, Melbourne, Brisbane, Adelaide, Perth, Darwin, Regional QLD, Northern NSW & Gold Coast, Southern NSW & ACT, Griffith, Broken Hill, Regional VIC, Tasmania, Eastern SA, Spencer Gulf, Central Australia, Regional WA
- Network: Network 10

Programming
- Language: English
- Picture format: 576i (SDTV) 16:9; 1080i (HDTV) 16:9 (Metropolitan, Regional QLD, Southern NSW & ACT and Northern NSW & Gold Coast)

Ownership
- Owner: Warner Bros. Discovery Asia-Pacific (Skydance Corporation)
- Parent: Network Ten Pty Limited
- Sister channels: Channel 10; 10 HD; 10 Drama; Nickelodeon; You.tv; Gecko TV

History
- Launched: 11 January 2011; 15 years ago
- Replaced: One SD (Standard definition)
- Former names: Eleven (2011–2018); 10 Peach (2018–2024); 10 Peach Comedy (2024–2025)

Links
- Website: 10.com.au

Availability

Terrestrial
- Freeview 10 metro (virtual): 11
- Freeview 10 Northern NSW & Gold Coast, Regional QLD, Southern NSW, Regional Victoria, 10 Tasmania (virtual): 52
- Freeview Seven Spencer Gulf SA/Broken Hill NSW (virtual): 53
- Freeview WIN/Seven Regional WA (virtual): 55
- Freeview 10 Darwin: 13
- Freeview 10 Central: 11

Streaming media
- 10

10 Comedy is an Australian free-to-air television channel operated by Network 10. It was launched on 11 January 2011 as Eleven. It is owned by ElevenCo, which was established as a joint venture between Ten Network Holdings and CBS Studios International; the latter would ultimately acquire Network Ten in 2017.

The channel focuses primarily on programming targeting a young adult audience and was the home of Neighbours—the longest-running drama series on Australian television. Prior to the launch of Nickelodeon, the channel also aired children's programming.

== History ==
Prior to the launch of the channel, Ten Network Holdings, at the time an independent company, established a joint venture company named ElevenCo with international distributor CBS Studios International. 10 held a two-thirds equity stake in the venture, with CBS holding the remaining share. Under the arrangement, Eleven gained access to programming from CBS's back catalogue. Ten Network Holdings entered administration in 2017 and was subsequently acquired by CBS Corporation, ultimately giving CBS full ownership of Eleven. CBS ultimately merged with Viacom, making 10 Comedy a sister network to MTV and Nickelodeon.

=== 10 Peach (2018–2024) ===
On 31 October 2018, the channel rebranded as 10 Peach, as part of a larger rebranding of Network 10. The new name is intended to provide a clearer scope for the channel's programming; Network 10's chief content officer Beverley McGarvey described "Peach" as feeling "relaxed" and "almost a guilty pleasure" to viewers, with programmes such as Neighbours, Supernatural, This Is Us, and Will & Grace, and continuing to skew towards younger demographics.

=== 10 Comedy (2024–present) ===
On 5 June 2024, it was announced that 10 Peach would rebrand to 10 Peach Comedy on 12 June 2024, as part of a rebranding of Bold and Peach to reflect their genre positionings.

On 30 June 2025, the channel shortened its name to 10 Comedy as part of a rebranding of Network 10.

== Programming ==
10 Comedy offers catch-up and encore presentations from Channel 10. It features a mix of repeated classic programs, new shows to Australian television, and shows that would make their debut on Australian free-to-air television.

Most of the classic programming on 10 Comedy comprises 80's, 90's and 2000's comedies and dramas sourced from Paramount Television, CBS Studios and CBS Studios International (via parent company Paramount Global).

Some of Ten's shows aimed at a younger demographic, most notably Neighbours, were moved to Eleven for the launch of the new channel. This was part of Ten's re-branding to target the older demographic. The decision to move Neighbours and other shows was to also make way for a new current affairs show in Ten's 6:00–7:00pm timeslot. In 2015 Neighbours was Eleven's highest-rating program and the number-one regular Australian program on the digital multichannels, averaging 278,000 viewers.

On 27 February 2012, Toasted TV was moved from Ten to Eleven due to a number of changes to their morning line-up, which included the launch of Breakfast. On 4 November 2013, more of Ten's shows including Totally Wild, Scope, Wurrawhy and Mako: Island of Secrets moved due to the launch of Wake Up and Studio 10. Other first-run Australian content on 10 Comedy includes Couch Time, The Loop and Bondi Ink Tattoo.

On 6 April 2020, a six-hour programming block of Nickelodeon children's content was added to the network, which aired under the Toasted TV branding. This ran until 27 September, when children's programming was entirely moved to 10 Shake.

The network also has ongoing content new and classic film and television brands from Paramount Pictures, DreamWorks Pictures, MTV Entertainment Studios, Miramax and Paramount Players.

== Availability ==
10 Comedy is available in 1080i high definition from the network's five metropolitan owned-and-operated stations, TEN Sydney, ATV Melbourne, TVQ Brisbane, ADS Adelaide, and NEW Perth, and available in 1080i high definition on it’s regional owned and operated stations, Regional Victoria GLV/BCV, CTC in Southern New South Wales/Australian Capital Territory, TNQ in Regional Queensland, and NRN in Northern New South Wales.

The channel is also available to regional Australia viewers through Seven Media Group's owned and operated stations SGS/SCN in Spencer Gulf and Broken Hill, MGS/LRS in eastern South Australia, WIN Television’s owned and operated stations MDN in Griffith and the MIA. Digital joint venture stations WDT in regional Western Australia, TDT in Tasmania, DTD in Darwin, and CDT in Remote Central & Eastern Australia also carry 10 Comedy.

== Logo and identity history ==
11 January 2011 – 31 October 2018

31 October 2018 – 12 June 2024

12 June 2024 – 30 June 2025

30 June 2025 – present

=== Slogan history ===
- 11 January 2011 – 31 October 2018: He11o
- 31 October 2018 – 12 June 2024: Life's Peachy
