= In the Box =

- Genre: Pre-school
- Created by: David Napier; Tony Powell
- Presented by: Michael McKenna; Tracey Fleming; Brett Annable
- Voices of: David Napier
- Theme music composer: Beeps
- Opening theme: "In the Box"
- Ending theme: "Goodbye, Goodbye (Put a Smile on Your Dial)"
- Composer: Rhonda Davidson-Irwin
- Country of origin: Australia
- Original language: English
- No. of seasons: 6

Production
- Executive producer: Cherrie Bottger
- Producer: Sandra Makaresz
- Production locations: Brisbane, Queensland
- Editor: Peter Christie
- Running time: 30 minutes

Original release
- Network: Network Ten
- Release: 21 December 1998 – 20 December 2006

Related
- Mulligrubs (1988–1996)

In the Box is a 30-minute preschoolers' television program that aired in Australia on Network Ten at 8:30 am to 9:00 am, from Monday to Friday. It first aired on 21 December 1998, with the series ending in 2006. It was most recently hosted by Brett Annable, Tracey Fleming, Michael McKenna and Bop, their resident puppet.

The show featured varied content. However, there were certain events that would take place during each episode. These included a 'delivery', in which the hosts received a box of items to do an activity with, a visit from two different children each day, and the goodbye song. Some episodes had a particular theme such as baking or time travel.

During each episode, Michael, Brett, Tracey and Bop sang a variety of songs which appealed to the young target audience. These included Simon Says, Follow the Leader and Washy Washy.
