= ADS (TV station) =

- Adelaide, South Australia; Australia
- Channels: Digital: 11 (VHF); Virtual: 10
- Branding: 10

Programming
- Language: English
- Network: 10

Ownership
- Owner: Warner Bros. Discovery Asia-Pacific (Ten Network Holdings); (Network TEN (Adelaide) Pty Ltd)

History
- First air date: 24 October 1959
- Former channel numbers: Analog: 7 (1959–1987), 10 (1987–2013)
- Former affiliations: Seven (1959–1987)
- Call sign meaning: The Advertiser/South Australia

Technical information
- Licensing authority: Australian Communications and Media Authority
- ERP: 50 kW
- HAAT: 485 m
- Transmitter coordinates: 34°58′52″S 138°42′29″E

Links
- Public licence information: Profile
- Website: 10.com.au

ADS is an Australian television station based in Adelaide, South Australia. It is owned and operated by Paramount Networks UK & Australia through their Australian holdings Network 10.

== History ==
ADS-10 began as ADS-7 on 24 October 1959, originally owned by The Advertiser newspaper, which was at the time controlled by The Herald and Weekly Times of Melbourne, founder of television station HSV-7. Therefore, ADS was originally associated with the channel 7 stations in the eastern states, forming the Australian Television Network, predecessor to today's Seven Network. ADS used the national Seven Network logos and presentation in the 1970s and 1980s, and, along with HSV-7, used Frank Gari's Hello News campaign.

Due to changes in cross media ownership laws, in the late 1980s ADS-7 was bought by media entrepreneur Kerry Stokes, who also owned CTC-7 in Canberra. In 1987, Stokes, with new regulations of the Broadcasting (Ownership and Control) Act, planned to buy the Seven Network from John Fairfax & Sons, which would have seen ADS-7 Adelaide and CTC-7 Canberra, along with a soon-to-be new station in Perth for which license was granted to a group led by Stokes, and aligned with ATN-7 Sydney & HSV-7 Melbourne. Stokes offered $100 million more than rival Christopher Skase for Seven, but was ultimately unsuccessful. Unable to build a metropolitan Seven television network, on 7 August 1987, Stokes sold ADS, CTC and his licence for what will become NEW-10 Perth to Northern Star Holdings, the then owners of Network 10.

This new ownership structure led to the unusual situation that two stations in Adelaide were owned by groups associated with stations in other capital cities bearing the opposite channel numbers. To better align the Adelaide stations with its new sister stations and networks, ADS-7 and Adelaide's original Network Ten station SAS-10 (owned by Seven Network affiliate TVW-7 Perth starting in the 1970s, and that would be acquired the next year by Seven Network owner at the time, Skase's Qintex) agreed to switch affiliations and channel positions, ADS moving to channel 10 and thus becoming the oldest station of Network 10, the younger SAS moving to channel 7. The switch was effective on 27 December 1987. The night before the swap, Seven National News reporter Alan Murrell reported about the pending changes on ADS-7, hours before the switch to Channel 10:

"Tonight will mark the end of the callsigns ADS-7 and SAS-10. Tomorrow, it'll be ADS-10 and SAS-7. It's the first time such a change has been made. The switch follows a media shake-up earlier this year, which left ADS in the hands of the owners of the Ten network. Already, the cosmetic changes are being made at Strangways Terrace and Gilberton. But viewers will notice little difference. They'll still turn the knob to 10 for Channel Ten programs, and to 7 for Seven programs."
"The only difference will be that the local personalities will be seen on different channels. So if you want to watch Steve Whitham and Caroline Ainslie reading the news tomorrow night, you simply turn the dial three positions, from 7 to ADS-10. And it's as easy as that."

Less than one month later, ADS, now on channel 10, adopted the new "X" logo that will be used for the final expansion of the network in Perth and Canberra.

In July 2007 ADS-10 moved from its original location at 125 Strangways Terrace, North Adelaide to a new studio on the corner of Wakefield and Hutt streets in the city.

In February 2022, Network 10 relocated again to new state-of-the-art studios on Greenhill Road in Eastwood, bringing to an end 15 years of broadcasting in Hutt Street studios in Adelaide.

== Digital multiplex ==
LCN	Service	SD/HD
1	10 HD	HD
10	10	SD
11	10 Comedy	SD
12	10 Drama	HD
13	Nickelodeon	SD
15	10 HD	HD
16	You.tv	SD
17	Gecko TV	SD

== Program production ==
Following the station's official opening, the Opening Night Variety Show was hosted by Sydney TV identity Bobby Limb, his wife Dawn Lake and comedian Buster Fiddess. Produced by Fred Maxian and directed by Geoff Grant, the show introduced the station's lineup of hosts for news, children's and daytime shows: Marie Tomasetti, Ian Cochius, Blair Schwartz, Angela Stacey, Bob Moore, Peter Cellier, Ian Boyce and Mary McMahon.

The early schedule included a talent show, Stairway to the Stars, hosted by Marie Tomasetti, the first show to recognise new talent, giving competitors an opportunity to perform. It was very basic, black and white, live action television. A weekly variety Monday night spectacular, The Light Show, which could afford interstate talent such as the schoolboy group, the Bee Gees. A full studio orchestra and dancers backed artists such as Kamahl, Little Pattie, Michael Cole, and a long list of other overseas artists including Tommy Steele.

Equipped with a new three-camera outside broadcast van, imported from the German manufacturer Fernseh, the station covered live events such as the John Martin's Christmas Pageant, Glenelg Beach Concerts, special events such as the arrival of The Mickey Mouse Club talent team, The Beatles' visit to Adelaide, as well as major sporting events. The station was owned by Advertiser Newspapers and the local office of the Philips electronics group delivered a top technical fit-out at the North Adelaide studios and the Mount Lofty transmitter site (with the central of the three masts). Many of ADS-7's original staff came from Adelaide commercial radio station 5AD (also owned by The Advertiser) and the Adelaide theatre scene. Production experience was imported from Melbourne commercial television station GTV-9, Melbourne commercial radio station 3DB and the ABC's Melbourne television station, ABV-2

Under the leadership of general manager Keith McDonald and program manager Neville Thomson, the station built a national reputation for production values with strong Art Direction under Trevor Ling and Brian Thompson. Studio directors, John Adey, Lynton Taylor, Graeme Blair, Ted Craig and Steve Bowman, Tony Roberts and Ian Ridley turned out hours of live content each week including Sports panels, daytime game shows, cooking and lifestyle segment, religious program, and a "Funfair" hosted by Angela Stacy, Rick Patterson with Chris and Terry, lit up Adelaide afternoons. Chief engineer, Norm Sawyer, Financial director, Brian Sallis and head of staging John Blain, technical director John Harvey, film manager Bronte Hall, telecine manager Trevor Tipplow, musical director John Drake and news editor Don Riddell were supported by a technical team many drawn from local radio and theatre who learnt the skills of television on the job. Cora Dove handled the make-up department. The station was self-contained with film processing, technical maintenance, set construction and even a gardener.

A highlight for the station were visits from national television shows to record South Australian episodes such as Coles Quiz, The Mobil Limb Show and Bandstand. The station's national export program was Playroom, produced by Heather Gell, a pioneer in pre-school radio and television in Australia. The news division, led by Don Riddell, produced early documentaries on the building of the Berlin Wall, Kenya and the formation of the Malaysian states. Film of interstate and major overseas events such as the assassination of US President John F. Kennedy and the Moon landing all arrived by air and were rushed to North Adelaide for transmission. The station's news camera van could be spotted all over the state as cameramen Wally Herzfeld and Brian Taylor filmed everything from road accidents, political interviews, the arrival of VIPs at Adelaide Airport, local sport and the everyday events that made news. Donald Campbell's land speed record attempts on Lake Eyre, ship wrecks on the Coorong and the disappearance of the Beaumont children were syndicated globally.

In the studios or on outside broadcasts, Mal Boxer and Brian Thomas were the audio directors who assisted either in the studio sound mix of news assignments or out in the field with audio equipment to complete the final product so it was ready to go to air.

Popular television shows made during the ADS-7 era include children's shows Cartoon Connection, SPECCO (SPace ECho COmpany) (with Pam Tamblyn & Steve Curtis), KO (Kids Only), and later, as ADS-10, the national pre-school program Mulligrubs. Music programming from ADS included Music Express (1975–1986), hosted by Steve Curtis then Greg Clark and Nightshift hosted by David Day. Popular variety shows included On The Sunnyside, The Penthouse Club and the weekday morning show, Lionel Williams' Woman's World.

The local current affairs show State Affair, hosted by Guy Blackmore, aired weeknights at 6:30 following Seven National News and featured stories about South Australia and its people. From 1967 to 1984, the Easter Appeal telethon was held each year to raise money for the Adelaide Children's Hospital. ADS-7 also broadcast the South Australian National Football League (SANFL) Australian rules football matches for many years with a commentary team comprising Bruce McAvaney, and former SANFL players Peter Marker, Robert Oatey and Ian Day.

The Strangways Terrace site contained two studios. Studio 1 was the largest and home to productions such as the Channel Seven Easter Appeal, Wheel of Fortune, It's Academic, SPECCO and KO while Studio 2 was host to smaller-scale entertainment programmes such as The Super Fun Show [hosted by Steve Curtis and Pam Tamblyn, Music Express, and news and current affairs, including Seven National News and State Affair. Permanent studio seating was provided in Studio One, with portable seating provided in Studio Two for The Super Fun Show. Audio operators Mal Boxer and Brian Thomas were two of the longest-serving operators in the proud history ADS Adelaide television. On-camera host Steve Curtis also worked extensively behind the scenes as a control room director for some years.

The popular television game show Wheel of Fortune originally commenced recording in studio 1 at ADS-10 in July 1981 with Ernie Sigley (later John Burgess from 1984), Adriana Xenides and Steve Curtis (later John Deeks from 1984) then after the changeover to SAS-7 in December 1987 moved to their studios where it remained until July 1996 when the show moved to ATN-7 Sydney.

== Programming ==
=== Current in-house productions ===
- 10 News: Adelaide (Friday bulletin only, plus sports and weather segments) (1987–2000, 2011–2020, 2023–present)

=== Previous in-house productions ===
- Studio 10 3-day outside broadcast (Feb 2014)
- Simply Footy (2002–2011)
- AFL coverage: Adelaide, Port Adelaide (2002–2011)
- The Music Shops (1996–1998)
- Mulligrubs (1988–1996)
- Wheel of Fortune (1981–1987, moved to SAS-7 in 1988)
- Seven News (Adelaide edition) (1959–1987)
- Aweful Movies with Deadly Earnest/Deadly Earnest's Nightmare Theatre (1967–1975, 1978)
- State Affair (1980s)
- The Penthouse Club (1974–1975)
- Good Friday Appeal/Easter Appeal (1967–1984)

== News and current affairs ==
ADS-10 produces a local news program at 5pm on weeknights.

10 News Adelaide is presented from the network's Sydney studios by Kate Freebairn with sports presenter Max Bulford and weather presenter Tiffany Warne. Reporters, camera crews and editorial staff are based at ADS-10's Greenhill Road studios in Eastwood.

In September 2020, studio production of the Adelaide bulletin was transferred to Network 10's Melbourne headquarters, leading to redundancies among local presentation and production staff.

=== Presenters and reporters ===
==== News presenter ====
- Kate Freebairn (2023–present in Sydney)

==== Sports presenter ====
- Max Bulford (2023–present)

==== Weather presenter ====
- Tiffany Warne (2023–present)

==== Reporters ====
- Danny Adamopoulos (Chief Of Staff)
- Tiffany Warne
- Katrina Muhsin
- Brett Clappis
- Alan Murrell (Senior)
- Jase Kemp (Sport)
- Caroline O'Dea
- Taylee Jones
- Jodie Oddy

=== Former presenters ===
- Ian Cochius (1959–1960s)
- Alec Macaskill (1960s–1976)
- Sandy Roberts (1970s–1979)
- Kevin Crease (1976–1986)
- Anne Fulwood (1984–1987)
- Steve Whitham (1979–1990)
- Steve Curtis (1975–1982)
- Caroline Ainsle (1987–1991)
- Sue Cardwell (1987–1993)
- Keith Martyn (1982–1995)
- Marina Emsley (1991–1996)
- Nikki Dwyer (1992–2000)
- Katrina Shute (1995–2002)
- Kelly Nestor (2001–2006)
- George Donikian (1991–2010)
- Belinda Heggen (2011–2012)
- Jane Reilly (1994–2013)
- Mark Aiston (1996–2014)
- Rebecca Morse (2006–2020)

=== Former reporters ===
- Adam Hegarty (now with Nine News Queensland)
- Alice Monfries (now with Nine News)
- James Wakelin (was with Nine News Adelaide)

== See also ==
- Television broadcasting in Australia
