= You.tv =

you.tv
- Type: Home shopping
- Country: Australia
- Broadcast area: Australia
- Network: Network 10
- Headquarters: Ultimo, Sydney

Programming
- Language: English
- Picture format: 576i (SDTV) 16:9

Ownership
- Sister channels: Channel 10; 10 HD; 10 Comedy; 10 Drama; Nickelodeon; Gecko TV

History
- Launched: 1 July 2024; 2 years ago
- Replaced: TVSN (channel space in metropolitan areas)

Links
- Website: youtv.com.au

Availability

Terrestrial
- TEN Sydney (DVB-T): 1574 @ 11 (219.5 MHz)
- ATV Melbourne (DVB-T): 1590 @ 11 (219.5 MHz)
- TVQ Brisbane (DVB-T): 1606 @ 11 (219.5 MHz)
- ADS Adelaide (DVB-T): 1622 @ 11 (219.5 MHz)
- NEW Perth (DVB-T): 1670 @ 11 (219.5 MHz)
- Freeview 10 metro (virtual): 16
- Freeview 10 Regional QLD, Southern NSW/ACT, Regional Victoria, Spencer Gulf SA/Broken Hill NSW, Northern NSW & Gold Coast (virtual): 58
- Freeview 10 Tasmania (virtual): 66
- Freeview 10 Darwin (virtual): 76

you.tv is an Australian television channel specialising in home shopping. It replaced TVSN, which moved channel numbers from the Network 10 multiplex to the Seven Network.

On 25 June 2024, it was announced that the channel would begin airing on channel 16 (channel 58 in 10 TV stations in regional areas, channel 66 in Tasmania via TNT and channel 76 in Darwin via TND in Seven’s TV stations in regional areas). The launch officially happened on 1 July 2024. All informercials for the channel are filmed and produced at Eden Studios in Ultimo.
