= Network 10 =

Australian television network

- Logo used since 2025
- Type: Free-to-air television network
- Country: Australia
- Broadcast area: Sydney; Melbourne; Brisbane; Adelaide; Perth; Regional Queensland; Northern NSW & Gold Coast; Southern NSW & ACT; Regional Victoria
- Affiliates: Seven Media Group; (Spencer Gulf & Broken Hill); WIN Television; (Griffith; Eastern SA); Tasmanian Digital Television (Tasmania); Darwin Digital Television (Darwin); Central Digital Television (Remote Central & Eastern Australia); West Digital Television (Western Australia)
- Headquarters: 1 Saunders Street; Pyrmont, New South Wales

Programming
- Language: English
- Picture format: 1080i HDTV (Note: Available on 10 HD and 10 Drama.) (downscaled to 16:9 576i for the SDTV feed)
- Timeshift service: 10+1

Ownership
- Owner: Skydance Asia-Pacific, Middle East, and North Africa
- Parent: Network Ten Pty Limited
- Sister channels: 10 HD; 10 Comedy; 10 Drama; Nickelodeon; You.tv; Gecko TV

History
- Launched: 1 August 1964; 62 years ago
- Former names: Independent Television System (1965–1970); The 0-10 Network (1970–1980); Network Ten (1980–1989, 1991–2018); 10 TV Australia (1989–1991)

Links
- Website: 10.com.au (accessible only within Australia)

Availability

Terrestrial
- TEN Sydney (DVB-T): 1570 @ 11 (219.5 MHz)
- ATV Melbourne (DVB-T): 1586 @ 11 (219.5 MHz)
- TVQ Brisbane/Gold Coast (DVB-T): 1602 @ 11 (219.5 MHz)
- ADS Adelaide (DVB-T): 1618 @ 11 (219.5 MHz)
- NEW Perth/Mandurah (DVB-T): 1666 @ 11 (219.5 MHz)
- Freeview 10 metro, Darwin & remote (virtual): 10
- Freeview 10 regional (virtual): 5/51
- Freeview 10 HD (virtual): 1/15/50

Streaming media
- 10

Network 10 (commonly known as Channel 10, Network Ten or simply ten or 10) is an Australian commercial television network. It is a wholly owned subsidiary of Skydance (through Skydance TV and its Asia Pacific division), and is one of the five national free-to-air networks in the country.

As of 2025, Network 10 is the fourth-rated television network and primary channel in Australia, behind the Seven Network, Nine Network and ABC TV but ahead of SBS.

== History ==
=== Origins ===
From the introduction of TV in 1956 until 1965, there were three television networks in Australia, the National Television Network (now the Nine Network), the Australian Television Network (now the Seven Network), and the public ABC National Television Service (now ABC TV). In the early 1960s, the Australian Government began canvassing the idea of licensing a third commercial television station in each capital city. This decision was seen by some as a way for the government to defuse growing public dissatisfaction with the dominance of imported overseas programming and the paucity of local content. The first of these third licences was granted to United Telecasters (a consortium of Amalgamated Wireless, Colonial Sugar Refining Company, Email, Bank of New South Wales and the NRMA) on 4 April 1963.

Structurally, the Australian television industry was closely modelled on the two-tiered system that had been in place in Australian radio since the late 1930s. One tier consisted of a network of publicly funded television stations run by the ABC, which was funded by government budget allocation and (until 1972) by fees from television viewer licences. The second tier consisted of the commercial networks and independent stations owned by private operators, whose income came from selling advertising time.

=== Launch ===
The network was launched as ATV-0 in Melbourne opened on 1 August 1964 and was owned by the Ansett Transport Industries, which at the time owned one of Australia's two domestic airlines. TEN-10 in Sydney, which opened on 5 April 1965, was originally owned by United Telecasters, which also in July that year opened TVQ-0 in Brisbane. Also opened later that month was SAS-10, serving the city of Adelaide.

The new television network was initially dubbed the Independent Television System or ITS, but in 1970 adopted the title The 0-10 Network, which reflected the channels used by the first two stations launched in the group, ATV and TEN.

Melbourne's ATV was the first station of the network to stage colour broadcasts in 1967; the broadcast was of the horse races in Pakenham, Victoria, and was seen by network and RCA executives and invited members of the media and press. This would be the first of many test colour telecasts for the station, and in 1974, in tribute to the event, the 0-10 Network adopted the First in Colour slogan, months before the 1 March 1975 transition to colour broadcasting.

=== 1970–1988: Expansion and original run ===
For its first five years, the 0-10 Network led a hand-to-mouth existence. By the beginning of the 1970s the network was in a precarious financial position and there were predictions that it would fail.

In 1971, the 0-10 Network first aired Young Talent Time, which was a huge rating success, and ran for 17 years.

However, the network's true financial reprise came about due to the fact that the controversial adult soap opera serial Number 96 premiered in March 1972 on the night that "Australian TV lost its virginity". The series broke new ground for Australian television and captured the imagination of viewers like few programs before or since. For the next three years it was consistently Australia's top-rating television program and, not surprisingly, its huge popularity attracted advertisers to Ten en masse, with the result that its revenue increased significantly from $1 million in 1971 to more than $10 million in 1972.

However, the pattern of rating dominance was already set, and for most of the next five decades from the mid-1960s, there was little deviation from the prevalent rankings, with the Nine Network typically in the first place, the Seven Network second, 0-10 third and ABC TV fourth.

The gradual evolution of Network Ten into its current form has its origins in the ongoing attempts by media mogul Rupert Murdoch to acquire a prized commercial television licence in Australia's largest capital city market, Sydney. This began when Murdoch's News Limited purchased the Wollongong station WIN-4 in the early 1960s, around the same time he bought Festival Records. In 1977, frustrated by regulatory blocks that prevented him from expanding into the Sydney market, Murdoch sold WIN and purchased a 46% share in Ten Sydney.

In 1979, Murdoch made an unsuccessful takeover bid for the Melbourne-based The Herald and Weekly Times media group, which originally owned HSV-7. Although the bid failed, he gained a 50% stake in Ansett, which thus gave him control of channel 0 in Melbourne.

In 1979, 0-10 first aired the soap opera Prisoner, which was a huge rating success.

On 20 January 1980, the 0-10 Network became known as Network Ten to reflect ATV moving from channel 0 to channel 10 – although the Brisbane station continued to broadcast as TVQ-0 until 10 September 1988 when the station changed to TVQ-10. In 1987 Adelaide's Network Ten affiliate (SAS-10) and Seven Network affiliate (ADS-7) successfully negotiated to exchange affiliation rights and channel frequencies due to ownership problems. On 27 December 1987, the exchange came into effect and ADS-7, owned by the same owners as the main Network Ten stations, became ADS-10 with SAS-10 converting to SAS-7, operated by TVW-7 in Perth.

When Murdoch became an American citizen in 1985 so that he could expand his media empire in the United States with the Fox network, Australia's media ownership laws obliged him to dispose of the flagship television stations, which were sold to The Northern Star, an offshoot of the Westfield Group conglomerate controlled by property tycoon Frank Lowy. However, Westfield was badly hit by the stock market crash of 1987, and in 1989 sold Network Ten to a consortium led by Charles Curran and former television journalist Steve Cosser.

The network became fully national in 1988 with the launch of NEW-10 in Perth after the introduction of satellite facilities made it economical for the network to broadcast to Western Australia. Northern Star officially took hold of TVQ-10 later in the year because of swapping frequencies with neighbouring DDQ-0 in Toowoomba and rebranded CTC Canberra under the network banner in time for aggregation.

=== 1989–1994: Receivership and relaunch ===
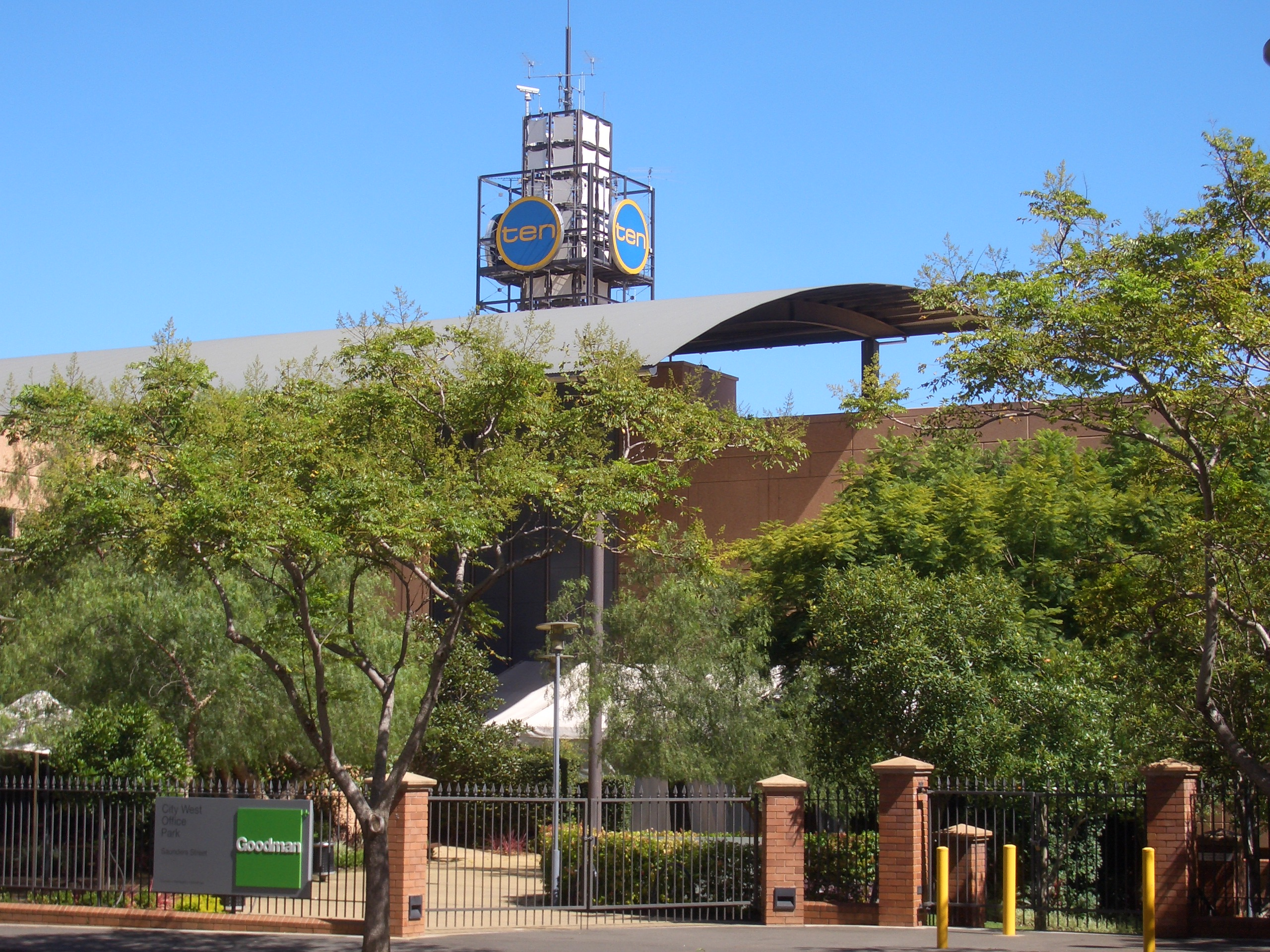
TEN, Network 10's corporate headquarters in Pyrmont, Sydney

In 1989, Ten's ratings were in decline, so on 23 July 1989, recently recruited network boss Bob Shanks relaunched the network, re-branding it as 10 TV Australia, and introducing several new programs, including four new prime time game shows. However, by the end of 1989, the ratings failed to improve and most of the new programs were cancelled, except for its Eyewitness News bulletins, Neighbours and E Street (debuting in late 1988).

Meanwhile, Northern Star Holdings were having financial and regulatory problems. The company was subject to an inquiry by the Australian Broadcasting Tribunal in relation to media ownership rules and had run into financial difficulties following the 1987 stock market crash two years earlier. On 1 September 1989, Northern Star Holdings announced a major restructuring to pay off debts and help restore profitability. The proposals included selling off the network's three smaller stations (ADS in Adelaide, NEW in Perth and CTC in Canberra) to Charles Curran's Capital Television Group. The sale was completed on 27 October 1989, effectively splitting Northern Star's Network Ten in half.

In September 1990, Northern Star went into receivership and on 13 January 1991 at 8:30pm, the network was re-branded back to Network Ten with the first version of its famous ten watermark logo. The network was placed into liquidation by the New South Wales Rugby League in May 1991. In 1992, the network's flagship stations were sold to the Canadian-based Canwest media group, which held a controlling stake in the network until 2009. Also in 1992, the network commenced a strategy of targeting younger audiences. The Adelaide and Perth stations were re-acquired by the network in 1995.

=== 1995–2007: Recovery and success ===
With the network having financially recovered, Ten Network Holdings floated on the Australian Stock Exchange in 1998. At this time, Ten had affiliate broadcasting agreements with Southern Cross Broadcasting in southern New South Wales, regional Victoria and Tasmania, and with Telecasters Australia in northern New South Wales and regional Queensland.

In 2001, Ten opened the doors to the Big Brother Australia house and, with it, reality television. The opening night of Big Brother became the most-watched program of the night. Big Brother became synonymous with the network in the 2000s, with the series lasting 8 seasons. Even after iterations on rival networks, Big Brother is set to return to 10 in 2025. The trend was then followed by the launching of the Australian version of the reality singing competition format Idols called Australian Idol in 2003. Australian Idol was a hit for several years, lasting until 2009.

In 2004, Network Ten enjoyed its best year since the 1970s, winning two rating weeks (out of 40) and finishing second nationally only behind the Nine Network and well ahead of the Seven Network. This was a departure from previous years; it has typically placed third behind Nine and Seven in most other rating years since 2000.

In 2005, Canwest was in discussions with newspaper publisher John Fairfax Holdings about a possible sale of the network, after the federal government indicated it may consider relaxing Australia's media cross-ownership laws. Previously, newspaper owners could not own television stations in the same city. Fairfax owned the Seven Network until 1988 and had been looking for a way back into television for a long time.

On 21 August 2005, the network celebrated its 40th birthday with a two-hour highlights package called Ten: Seriously 40, which was hosted by Bert Newton and Rove McManus.

On 27 October 2005, Network Ten announced that its long-running morning talk-variety program Good Morning Australia would be cancelled at the end of the year after a fourteen-year run. This ended host Bert Newton's 14-year association with Network Ten; although he was offered ongoing employment with the network, he announced that he would be returning to the Nine Network. 9am with David & Kim replaced GMA as Ten's national morning program from 2006 to 2009.

From 2006 to 2008, Ten was the official broadcaster of Sydney New Year's Eve. The rights returned to the Nine Network from 2009.

On 7 August 2007, Network Ten and Foxtel signed a new agreement allowing Ten's digital signal to be transmitted via Foxtel's cable and satellite services. Prior to this, Ten was only transmitted via cable on Foxtel in an analogue format and Austar in standard definition digital via Mystar. Similarly in October 2007, Network Ten and Optus announced that Ten's digital signal would be available on its cable network from 1 December 2007.

On 16 December 2007, Ten HD was officially launched as a breakaway channel, becoming the first new commercial television channel in metropolitan areas of Australia since 1988. Ten HD ceased broadcasting on 25 March 2009 when it was replaced by what was a sports-only high-definition channel, One HD.

=== 2009–2015: Canwest sale, multichannels launch ===
On 24 September 2009, Canwest announced that it was selling its 50.1% stake in Ten Network Holdings for $680 million, to pay down its significant debt. In late 2009, Canwest filed for creditor bankruptcy protection, due to CA$4 billion mounting debt across radio, television broadcasting and publishing assets in several countries.

On 20 October 2010, four years after he sold his shares in PBL Media to private equity firm CVC Asia Pacific, James Packer purchased 16 per cent of Ten.

Network Ten launched a new digital channel, Eleven, on 11 January 2011. The channel is aimed at a "distinctly youthful" audience between the ages of 13 and 29. Neighbours and The Simpsons were high-profile programs migrating from Ten to the new channel. The channel was a joint venture with CBS Studios International, which owned a 33% stake.

On 8 May 2011, Ten relaunched its sports-based channel One, with general entertainment programming aimed at males taking over the schedule. It is aimed at a similar audience to 7mate.

In 2012, Ten unsuccessfully launched many new programs. This led to Ten's ratings dropping to fourth place behind ABC TV for over thirty straight nights. The poor performance resulted in Chief Programming Officer David Mott's resignation.

In September 2012, Ten made a partnership with TVSN, which meant the TVSN channel became available on Ten's free-to-air multiplex to metropolitan viewers as a datacast service on LCN 14, on 24 September 2012.

In late 2012, Ten reported a loss of $12.9m as it battled poor advertising markets and failed to hold larger audience numbers. They made positions at the station redundant and said that production may become centralised.

Ten launched Spree TV, an Australian free-to-air datacasting television channel mainly carrying paid programming and home shopping, on 17 September 2013, on LCN 15, with Brand Developers.

Analogue broadcasts ceased in the regions on 10 December 2013.

On 1 August 2014, the network celebrated its 50th anniversary. A television special related to the anniversary called 50 Years Young aired on 3 August 2014, after being rescheduled from 8 August by the network.

On 15 June 2015, Foxtel (co-owned by News Corp) bought 15% shares in Ten Network Holdings, pending approval from the ACCC. Prior to the acquisition, Discovery backed out from a bidding partnership with Foxtel. In July 2015, Paul Anderson was announced as the new chief executive officer.

=== 2016–2017: New affiliation and financial troubles ===
A high-definition simulcast of 10 was revived on 2 March 2016. As a result, One, now known as 10 Drama, began broadcasting in standard definition only.

On 29 April 2016, the Nine Network pulled its regional affiliation with WIN Television over a lawsuit involving its catch-up service 9Now, and announced a new affiliation agreement with Southern Cross Austereo, Ten's then-primary regional affiliate. Ten subsequently negotiated a five-year affiliation deal with WIN; the new affiliations took effect on 1 July, with WIN becoming the carrier of Network Ten programming in regional Queensland, Northern NSW, Southern NSW, Victoria, Tasmania, South Australia, Western Australia, the Australian Capital Territory and the Gold Coast. WIN owner and Ten's largest shareholder Bruce Gordon positioned himself to increase his ownership stake in Ten, subject to changes to media ownership laws being passed.

Following Ten Network Holdings reporting a $232 million half year loss, shareholders Lachlan Murdoch, Bruce Gordon and James Packer withdrew support for $250 million guaranteed loan that would help keep Ten out of receivership. This loan was intended to replace an existing guaranteed $200 million loan that was due to expire in December. On 13 June, Ten asked the Australian Securities Exchange that their stock be placed in a 48-hour trading halt while it assessed its options concerning receivership. It went into voluntary administration the following day.

On 28 August 2017, Ten's administrators announced that the US media company CBS Corporation (which had a 33% share in the multichannel Eleven and was Ten's largest creditor) had entered into a binding agreement to purchase the company for $123 million. CBS refinanced Ten's existing debt including guarantor fees to shareholders Packer, Murdoch and Gordon, and existing loans from the Commonwealth Bank. Shareholders in Ten Network Holdings lost their investment.

Gordon and Murdoch had also placed their own joint bid for the company, which was not endorsed by the administrators. At a meeting held on 12 September, Ten's creditors overwhelmingly voted in support of CBS' bid, citing concerns over Murdoch's previous management of Ten and talk of mass job cuts in the news department under Murdoch/Gordon ownership.

The CBS acquisition was completed on 16 November 2017, when the shares of Ten Network Holdings were transferred to CBS Network Ten BV, a company registered in the Netherlands.

=== 2017–2024: CBS, later Paramount ownership ===
Following the CBS acquisition, the network became a division of CBS Studios International. Ten moved to commission more Australian content. The additional programs were financed by the savings from the dissolution of Ten's output agreement with 21st Century Fox. CBS also moved to re-establish an in-house advertising sales department for 2019, bringing to an end Ten's four-year period with the Foxtel-affiliated Multi Channel Network (MCN). One reason CBS acquired Ten was to assist the company to launch its CBS All Access streaming service in the Australian market. The service launched in December 2018 and was branded 10 All Access in the local market.

On 31 October 2018, the network unveiled a new logo, replacing the "ten" wordmark used since 1991 with a stylised circle 10, and the network is now referred to in the text as Network 10. The new brand is used across all of Network 10's platforms and services, and was intended to reflect the broadcaster's positioning as an "adventurous alternative" with a "sense of fun". 10 also relaunched its multi channels Eleven and One as 10 Peach and 10 Boss, with Boss focusing on dramatic programming and targeting an older adult audience, and Peach continuing to be targeted towards young adults. 10 Boss was forced to change its name to 10 Bold on 10 December 2018 due to trademark conflicts with Fairfax Media.

On 4 December 2019, CBS Corporation completed a re-merger with fellow media conglomerate Viacom as ViacomCBS; the two companies had previously separated in 2005. ViacomCBS subsequently began to integrate the companies' operations in Australia; in a reorganisation of the ViacomCBS Networks International division, Network 10 would join its new sister network in the United Kingdom, Channel 5 (which was owned by Viacom) as part of ViacomCBS Networks UK & Australia (now Paramount Networks UK & Australia) division in January 2020. The following month, it was announced that the former Viacom channels in Australia would be brought under the Network 10 sales department, moving away from Foxtel Media (formerly MCN) in April. Network 10 also began to co-commission new programmes with Channel 5, including the drama miniseries Lie With Me and documentary series The Royals Revealed.

On 13 July 2020, it was announced that Network 10 would launch a third digital channel, 10 Shake, on 27 September and on channel 13. The network carries children's programmes in the daytime hours (drawing primarily television from Nickelodeon), while evening and primetime hours will feature "edgy" series and films targeting young adults, including television programmes from Comedy Central and MTV, and CBS late-night talk show The Late Late Show with James Corden.

On 16 September 2020, in 10's metropolitan areas, various Network 10 channels moved channel places due to the launch of Network 10's third digital channel 10 Shake. The channels that moved places include TVSN, which moved to channel 16 from channel 14, 10 HD, which moved to channels 1 and 15 from channel 13 and Spree TV, which moved to channel 17 from channel 15. As a result, 10 Bold is now solely on channel 12. A placeholder for 10 Shake appeared on the same day.

In March 2021, 10 announced that it would return to Southern Cross Austereo as its regional affiliate in most markets beginning on 1 July 2021, in a deal that will last at least two years. The agreement reversed 10's 2016 move to WIN, which had announced a long-term agreement to return to the Nine Network.

In February 2022, Network 10 and Paramount+ announced that it had commissioned NCIS: Sydney, a spin-off of CBS's drama franchise NCIS.

On 15 February 2022, it was announced that ViacomCBS would be rebranding as Paramount Global as part of a wide rebrand strategy.

On 12 August 2022, Spree TV, the network's shopping channel, on channel 17, ceased to broadcast. It was replaced by Gecko, a similar shopping channel, on 18 September 2022.

On 22 June 2023, it was announced that 10 Shake would rebrand as Nickelodeon on 1 August, featuring programmes under the Nick Jr., Nickelodeon, and Nick at Nite brands. The Foxtel pay television version of the channel subsequently closed down.

On 5 June 2024, it was announced that 10 Peach and 10 Bold would be rebranded as 10 Peach Comedy and 10 Bold Drama on 12 June.

=== 2024–present: Acquisition of regional affiliate stations ===
On 17 December 2024, Southern Cross Austereo announced the sale of their regional television licenses in Regional QLD, Southern NSW/ACT and Regional Victoria to Network 10. As part of the sale, SCA will receive a share of profits from the stations for the first 5 years post-completion. The sale was completed on 1 March 2025.

On 13 February 2025, Network 10 announced they are also acquiring their affiliate in Northern NSW/Gold Coast from WIN Television, which was later completed on 1 May 2025. Following the completion of both SCA and WIN acquisitions, Network 10 will directly own and operate the four main regional licenses across the eastern states of Australia, the second network after the Seven Network to do so.

In June 2025, ahead of a revamp of its evening schedule on 30 June, Network 10 began to phase in a reimaging to make the branding of its various properties more consistent: the channel updated its logo to remove the circle, consolidated 10Play under the "10" brand to unify its linear and streaming outlets, and 10 News First, 10 Bold Drama and 10 Peach Comedy shortened their names to "10 News", "10 Drama" and "10 Comedy" respectively.

On 10 August 2026, Network 10 launched 10+1, a free-to-air timeshift channel which broadcasts the main Channel 10 schedule with a one-hour delay.

== Programming ==
=== Local programs ===
10's current Australian programming line-up includes Gogglebox Australia, Australian Survivor, I'm A Celebrity...Get Me Out of Here!, The Amazing Race Australia, MasterChef Australia, Big Brother Australia, The Traitors Australia, Talkin' 'Bout Your Gen, House Hunters Australia, Airport 24/7, The Dog House Australia, Dogs Behaving (Very) Badly, Have You Been Paying Attention?, The Cheap Seats, Taskmaster Australia, The Inspired Unemployed (Impractical) Jokers, Deal or No Deal, Millionaire Hot Seat, Sam Pang Tonight, the ARIA Awards and the AACTA Awards.

=== International programs ===
Current American programming that airs on 10 and its digital multichannels is sourced from 10's deals with sister company Paramount Global Content Distribution / Paramount Home Entertainment / Paramount Media Networks and Nickelodeon International, Miramax, United International Pictures, DreamWorks / DreamWorks Animation, Warner Bros. International Television Distribution, Sony Pictures Television and Transmission Films. When it was independent, 10 had a long-standing relationship with Paramount Global Content Distribution (then CBS Studios International) for the Australian TV rights to its content.

On 27 October 2017, Network 10's studio output deal with 20th Century Fox was terminated due to the network's bankruptcy and the CBS acquisition of the network in the same year. Consequently, the network lost the TV rights to popular shows such as The Simpsons, Modern Family, Fresh Off the Boat and Life in Pieces, among others. Coincidentally, as of the acquisition of 21st Century Fox by Disney, a deal, with exceptions, was then picked up by Disney affiliate Seven Network.

In 2018 however, 10 would create a newly acquired programming deal with Warner Bros. and Roadshow Entertainment, granting the network programming rights until 2025.

==== Shared overseas programs ====
Shared American programming which airs on 10 and Seven and its digital multi-channels are sourced from 10 and Seven's deals with Sony Pictures Television, CBS Studios and DreamWorks / DreamWorks Animation.

Shared American programming which airs on 10 and Nine and its digital multi-channels are sourced from 10 and Nine's deals with Sony Pictures Television, CBS Studios, United International Pictures, DreamWorks / DreamWorks Animation and Warner Bros. International Television Distribution.

Shared American programming that airs on 10 and ABC and its digital multi-channels are sourced from 10 and the ABC's deals with Sony Pictures Television and Warner Bros. International Television Distribution.

=== Former programs ===
The network formerly broadcast catalogue movie and television titles from 20th Century Fox from 1980s to 1997 and 2007 to 2017, Regency Enterprises from 2015 to 2017, Sony Pictures (film only) produced in the 1990s prior to 2020, NBCUniversal from 1988 to 2016, Metro-Goldwyn-Mayer from the late 1990s to 2004, Touchstone from 2017 to 2022, Roadshow from 1980s to 1990s and 2018 to 2024 and Lionsgate Films from 2019 to 2024.

In 2009, 10 lost the rights to Universal Pictures after more than 20 years of movies and television broadcasting when the Seven Network won the $500 billion and long-term deal with the movie and television studio broadcast TV rights.

== News and current affairs ==
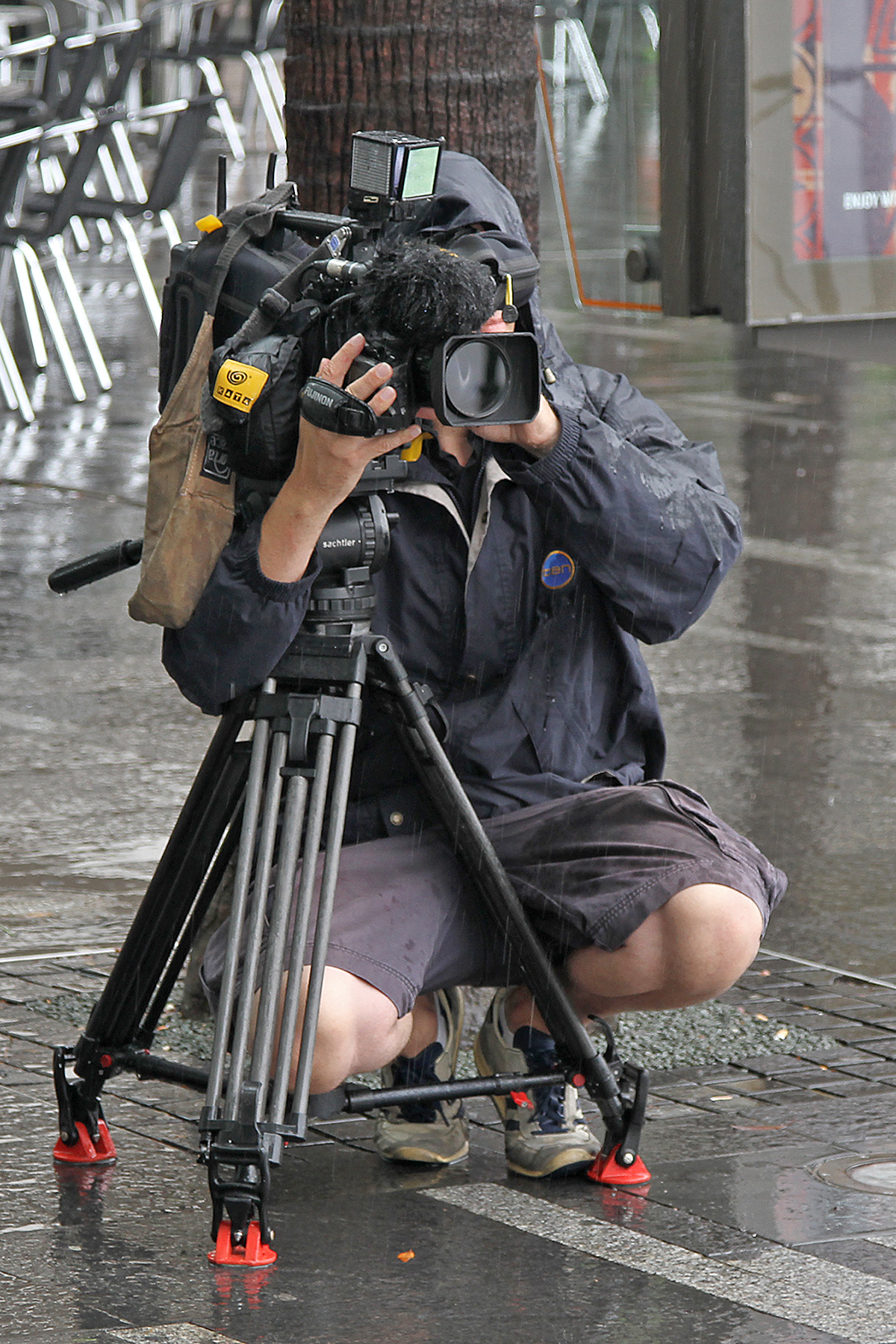
10 News cameraman filming a traffic piece in Sydney by Vic Lorusso

Network 10's news service is called 10 News (previously Ten News, Ten Eyewitness News and 10 News First). It produces local bulletins each weeknight and national bulletins on weekday lunchtime, afternoons, late night and weekends.

10 has access to a sister service CBS News for international news coverage.

During weekday overnights and Sunday mornings, Network 10 rebroadcasts American television network CBS's (sister network since 2017) morning news program CBS Mornings.

In November 2006, Network 10 struck a deal with CBS, reportedly worth A$6 million a year. This allows Network Ten the rights to air all CBS News footage, as well as access to its 60 Minutes, Dr. Phil, Late Show with David Letterman and 48 Hours programs. This deal occurred after CBS's talks with the Nine Network broke down, with Nine refusing to pay A$8 million a year to continue its 40-year deal with CBS. Ten in turn struck a cheaper deal and has onsold CBS's 60 Minutes stories to Nine.

On 31 July 2012, Entertainment Tonight was picked up by Network 10 after airing since 1982 until 30 June 2012 on the Nine Network following cutbacks on overseas purchases.

In late 2012, 10 reported a loss of $12.9m as it battled poor advertising markets and failed to hold larger audience numbers. They made positions at the station redundant and said that production may become centralised.

In September 2020, a major restructure of the news service saw local bulletins in Brisbane and Adelaide axed, with their bulletins being merged with their Sydney and Melbourne counterparts, respectively, and production of the Perth bulletin once again move to Sydney. Between February 2023 and August 2024, the changes were periodically reversed, with the Adelaide and Melbourne bulletins reinstated as separate editions that month, production of the Perth bulletin returning to Subiaco the following month, and the Sydney and Brisbane bulletins reinstated as separate editions from September 2024.

== Sport ==
The network is a major player in Australian sports broadcasting. All sports broadcasts on 10 and its multi-channels are labelled under the 10 Sport brand. Since the Paramount takeover, however, the channel has significantly toned down its commitment to sports programming.

In 2002, 10 combined with the Nine Network and Foxtel to acquire broadcast rights for the Australian Football League, the elite Australian rules competition, displacing the Seven Network which had held the rights for more than 40 years. 10 broadcast Saturday afternoon and Saturday night games and had exclusive rights for all finals games. Along with the Seven Network, 10 placed a successful $780 million bid to jointly broadcast the game from 2007 to 2011. Under this deal, 10 continued to broadcast the Saturday component of the competition. However, unlike the previous deal, 10 did not hold the exclusive rights to the finals series. Instead, the networks shared the broadcasting of the finals series and alternated the broadcast of the grand final. In the years when 10 did not televise the Grand Final (2008 and 2010), it telecast the pre-season Grand Final and the Brownlow Medal presentation. 10 ended AFL broadcasting after 10 years at the conclusion of the 2011 season.

10 broadcast the 2007 Rugby World Cup.

In 2003, 10 started broadcasting the Formula One World Championship after the Nine Network dropped the rights in 2002 after more than twenty years of coverage.

All Big Bash League games were broadcast in Australia by 10. In 2013, 10 paid $100 million for BBL rights over five years, marking the channel's first foray in elite domestic cricket coverage. Ten previously held the broadcast rights to the Indian Premier League.

10, in joint partnership with subscription television provider Foxtel, had broadcast rights for the 2010 Commonwealth Games.

10 acquired broadcast rights to the 2014 Winter Olympics in Sochi, Russia for AUD$20 million after all three major commercial networks pulled out of bidding on rights to both the 2014 and 2016 Olympic Games due to cost concerns. The Nine Network had lost AUD$22 million on its joint coverage of the 2012 Games with Foxtel, and the Seven Network's bid was rejected for being lower than what Nine/Foxtel had previously paid.

In 2018, 10 signed the rights to the Melbourne Cup Carnival, after the Seven Network ended the rights for 17 years.

In 2019, 10 broadcast the 2019 Rugby World Cup.

In 2021, 10 acquired the rights to a range of football content, most notably both A-League Men and Women competitions as well as Socceroos and Matildas games. The deal also included content from the AFC, which includes the AFC Champions League and other World Cup qualifiers in the AFC region involving non-Australian teams, among others. Football content will be broadcast across both Paramount+ and free-to-air platforms.

== Availability ==
Network 10 is available in standard definition and in 1080i high definition. Core programming is fibre fed out of ATV Melbourne to its sister stations and regional affiliates with TEN Sydney providing national news programming. The receiving stations and affiliates then insert their own localised news and advertising which is then broadcast in metropolitan and regional areas via Network 10's owned-and-operated stations: TEN Sydney, ATV Melbourne, TVQ Brisbane, ADS Adelaide, NEW Perth, TNQ Regional Queensland, NRN Northern New South Wales & Gold Coast, CTC Southern NSW & ACT, and GLV/BCV Regional Victoria.

The network's programming is also carried into regional Australia by affiliate stations owned by Seven Media Group (SGS/SCN Spencer Gulf & Broken Hill), WIN Television (MGS/LRS Eastern SA, MDN Griffith), Tasmanian Digital Television, Darwin Digital Television, Central Digital Television and West Digital Television.

In addition to this, 10 is retransmitted via Foxtel's cable and satellite pay television services.

=== 10 HD ===
The 10 HD multichannel was launched on 16 December 2007 on channels 1 & 14 for 2 years of experience until breakaway programming. 10 HD ceased broadcasting on 26 March 2009 with the launch of One HD, and later revived on 2 March 2016. It broadcasts identical programming to 10 but in 1080i HD.

From 2002, this was interspersed with a loop of high definition demonstration material during business hours, for viewing in the showrooms of television retailers, at the conclusion of an equivalent service by Network 10.

After the Nine Network restarted broadcasting 9HD in November 2015, 10 confirmed that it was working on rebroadcasting 10 HD. However, they did not put a time frame on it, stating that they are "working through some technical and rights issues". On 11 February 2016, some smart TVs began receiving notification messages advising of 10 HD through a "ghost broadcast" that soon disappeared.

10 later recommenced simulcasting in high definition on 2 March 2016 on channel 13 from 3pm, in time for the 2016 season of the Virgin Australia Supercars Championship. As a result, One was reduced to a standard definition broadcast on both channel 1 and channel 12. 10 uses MPEG-4 technology to broadcast 10 HD.

=== Streaming service ===
The network's free video on demand and catch up TV service, 10 (formerly 10Play), launched on 29 September 2013. It replaced the network's old website that offered limited catch-up TV services. In December 2022, 10 launched FAST channels on the service. The service is available on the web and via apps for mobile devices, smart TVs, set-top boxes and video game consoles.

==== Paramount+ ====
10 All Access was launched on 4 December 2018 as an ad-free subscription streaming service. It was a rebranded, localised version of CBS All Access. The service offered programming from 10 and CBS's libraries, original programming, a Livestream of CBS News and the ability to watch select CBS programmes prior to their broadcast on 10's channels.

In August 2020, following the re-merger of CBS Corporation and Viacom, ViacomCBS revealed plans to launch a new international streaming brand using the CBS All Access infrastructure, which would include CBS All Access and Showtime original programmes, Paramount Pictures films, other ViacomCBS library content, and content contributed from local subsidiaries. It was stated that existing Paramount Plus streaming services in Latin America and Nordic Europe, as well as 10 All Access, would be migrated to the then-unnamed service.

On 16 September 2020, it was officially announced that 10 All Access would be rebranded as Paramount+ in mid-2021. On 7 May 2021, it was announced that Paramount+ would launch on 11 August. ViacomCBS also announced that the second season of Five Bedrooms would premiere on Paramount Plus' launch date and that Australian original series including Spreadsheet, Last King of the Cross and movie 6 Festivals were in production for the platform. In 2022, the streaming platform streamed exclusive coverage of the FA Cup in Australia and announced original series Spreadsheet, The Bridge Australia and Couples Therapy Australia. It also released teen drama More Than This, lifestyle factual series Undressed and documentary series Sky Blue: Inside Sydney FC. In 2023, Paramount+ released original series Last King of the Cross, One Night, NCIS: Sydney, The Betoota Advocate Presents, The Inspired Unemployed (Impractical) Jokers and movie The Appleton Ladies' Potato Race.

==== Pluto TV ====
At the start of August 2023, it was confirmed that an Australian version of Pluto TV would be launched within the existing live streaming service platform for Network 10 from the end of the month. The initial tranche of content announced for the new service included "box set" FAST channels for series such as South Park, I Love Lucy and Happy Days, alongside several MTV and Nickelodeon branded streams, such as MTV Reality, Nick Classics and Nicktoons.

== Controversy ==
For the 2006 series of Big Brother, Ten appointed two censors to review the show instead of one. The Federal Minister for Communications, Senator Helen Coonan, was reported to have said that she would be keeping a "close watch on the show's 2006 series". This controversy resulted in Big Brother Uncut being renamed Big Brother: Adults Only for the 2006 season of Big Brother. In two separate findings, the Australian Communications and Media Authority determined Network Ten breached clause 2.4 of the Commercial Television Industry Code of Practice. These two breaches were in relation to the broadcast of Big Brother Uncut on 30 May, 13 June and 4 July 2005. The broadcast material was not classified according to the Television Classification Guidelines.

Despite toning down Big Brother: Adults Only significantly in comparison to 2005, the series continued to attract controversy. After Big Brother: Adults Only was abruptly cancelled several weeks early, a subsequent incident of alleged sexual assault in the house saw the removal of two housemates and a huge public outcry calling for the series to be cancelled entirely. This incident generated significant publicity for the show, even prompting the Prime Minister of Australia to call on Network Ten to "do a bit of self-regulation and get this stupid program off the air."

Just prior to the fifth anniversary of the 9/11 attacks, Network Ten broadcast 911: In Plane Site, a documentary that examined conspiracy theories about the terrorist attacks. Federal Labor politician Michael Danby demanded that the programming director of the station be sacked.

On 8 October 2008, the Australian Communications and Media Authority (ACMA) found Network Ten guilty of breaching the Commercial Television Industry Code of Practice by using subliminal advertising during the broadcast of the 2007 ARIA Music Awards on 28 October 2007. Network Ten had inserted single frames (lasting 1/25th of a second) into the program broadcast. This was exposed on the ABC's Media Watch program.

== Logo and identity history ==
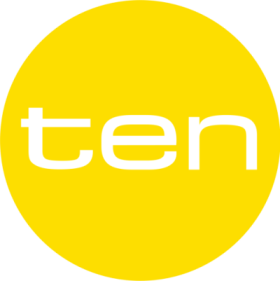
Alternate logo used in 2012

From 1964 to 1984 Network 10's four stations – ATV-0/ATV-10 Melbourne, TEN-10 Sydney, TVQ-0 Brisbane and SAS-10 Adelaide – used different logos to identify themselves. There had also been a number of network-wide logos used from the mid-1960s through to the early 1980s.

By late-1985 ATV-10, SAS-10 and TEN-10 were all using the same logo – a circle with "TEN" in the centre, somewhat in the style of a neon sign. This logo had been introduced by TEN-10 on 16 January 1983, was adopted by ATV-10 in June 1984 and by SAS-10 in October 1985. The logo was also similar to the new logo adopted by Brisbane's TVQ-0 in April 1983, when that station became branded as TV0 – a neon sign-style circle with "TV" in the centre.

Kicking off several years of branding upheaval, on 24 January 1988 ATV-10, ADS-10 and TEN-10 all adopted the "X TEN" logo, followed by Perth's NEW-10 when the station launched in May of that year, and finally TVQ-0 on 10 September, when the station changed frequency and became TVQ-10. On 23 July 1989, the network rebranded again to "10 TV Australia".

On 13 January 1991, the network introduced a new logo featuring a lowercase "ten" in a circle; four variations of this logo would appear over the next 27 years. The first version consisted of a white, silver or metallic ring enclosing a blue circle with "ten" in yellow lowercase text. A revision of the logo with a yellow ring was introduced with the "Give Me Ten" ident campaign in 1995, but the white/silver/metallic ring was reintroduced with the network's 1997 idents. It was not until 1 October 1999 when the "Electric" ident was launched that the ring became yellow permanently.

On 16 December 2007, the logo was enhanced for HD with a glossy "ball" effect similar to the logo of the American network ABC. On 22 June 2013, the logo changed again, when the ring and lettering became blue as well.

On 31 October 2018, the network unveiled a completely new logo, in its first major rebranding since 1991. The new branding replaced the "ten" wordmark with a numeric 10 in a circle.

On 30 June 2025, 10 refreshed its branding, removing the circle from its logo, and simplifying the names of properties such as 10 News First (which was shortened to 10 News), and its multichannels (which became simply "10 Comedy" and "10 Drama"). In addition, the 10 Play brand was dropped, with both the linear and streaming services now being promoted together as "10", following the lead of its British sister network 5. The network's designers stated that the updated logo was meant to be more flexible in usage, and allow for a more streamlined and consistent branding between 10's various properties.

ATV-10: 20 January 1980 – 3 June 1984

TEN-10: 16 January 1983 – 24 January 1988;
ATV-10: 3 June 1984 – 24 January 1988;
SAS-10: October 1985 – 27 December 1987;
ADS-10: 27 December 1987 – 24 January 1988

ATV-10, ADS-10, TEN-10:
24 January 1988 – 23 July 1989;
NEW-10: 20 May 1988 – 23 July 1989;
TVQ-10: 10 September 1988 – 23 July 1989

23 July 1989 – 13 January 1991

13 January 1991 – 30 September 1999

1 October 1999 – 16 December 2007

16 December 2007 – 22 June 2013

22 June 2013 – 31 October 2018

31 October 2018 – 30 June 2025

30 June 2025 – present

== Slogans ==
The 0–10 Network (1970–1980)

- 1970: Make Love, Not Revolution! (Used as a response to the Seven Network's "Revolution" campaign)
- 1974–1975: First in Color (Melbourne/Sydney/Adelaide only)
- 1976: The Big Parade! (Melbourne/Brisbane only, based on "Seventy-Six Trombones" from the musical The Music Man)
- 1977: I Like It! (Based on the song by Silver Convention)
- 1978: Channel Ten is the Great Entertainer! (Sydney only)
- Summer 1977/78: Keep Your Eye on the Circle, Keep Your Eye on the 0! (Melbourne/Brisbane only)
- 1979–1980: Come Up to TEN! (Sydney/Adelaide only)

Network Ten (1980–2018)

- 1980 (Melbourne), 1981 (Adelaide): You're on Top with Ten!
- 1982–1983: Reach from the Stars on Channel 10! (Melbourne only)
- 1983–1984: You're Home on Ten (Melbourne/Sydney/Adelaide only, used on and off by ATV-10 in 1985–86, only as station ID music)
- 1985–1986: It's Your Home on Ten!/'Cause You're Home on Ten (Melbourne/Adelaide only)
- 1985–1988: Ten out of Ten Australia – We Give You Ten (Sydney/Adelaide only)
- 1988: We're For You! (Ten's for You!)
- 24 January 1988 – 23 July 1989: X TEN (also used for Capital Television after aggregation for Southern NSW/ACT from March–July 1989, not used in Brisbane until September 1988)
- 1989: Something's Going On Around Here! c/w Look! You've Got a Friend on TEN
- 23 July 1989 – 13 January 1991: 10 TV Australia (also used for Capital Television)
- 1990–1994: The Entertainment Network (also used for Star Television in 1990 and Capital Television from 1991 to 1994)
- Summer 1990/91: Channel Ten's Summer of Entertainment!
- 1991: That's Entertainment! (used elements from CBS's "Get Ready 1990" video. Also used for Capital Television and QTV)
- 1992: This Is It! (borrowed lyrical elements from ABC's "America's Watching ABC" and visuals from Fox's "It's on FOX!" video. Also used by Northern Rivers Television NRTV)
- 1993: It's on Ten! (borrowed from FOX's 1990 slogan)
- 1994: That's Ten! (also used by Ten Capital)
- February 1995 – November 1997: Give Me Ten!
- Summer 1997/98: Have a Cool Summer
- February 1998 – August 1999: Turn Me On Ten
- September 1999 – November 2000: Ten.
- Summer 2000/01: Let Ten Entertain You...
- 11 February 2001 – 22 January 2012: Seriously Ten
- Summer 2009/10: Summer's Looking Good!
- 2012 (22 January – 6 May): Turn It On (based on the song Turn Me On by David Guetta feat. Nicki Minaj)
- 1 January 2014 – 31 October 2018: Turn on 10
- 1 August 2014: 10, Celebrating 50 Years Young

Network 10 (2018–present)

- 31 October 2018 – 23 October 2019: TV with a Twist
- 23 October 2019 – 15 October 2020: Now You're Talking
- 15 October 2020 – 12 July 2022: There's No Place Like 10
- 12 July 2022 – 30 June 2025: TV That's So Good
- 6 October 2022 – present: A Mountain of Entertainment (shared with Paramount+ streaming service, referencing Paramount Pictures iconic logo)
- 30 June 2025 – present: Seriously Good Entertainment
- 30 June 2025 – present: Watch + Stream free

== See also ==
- List of Australian television series
- 10 Comedy
- 10 Drama
- Nickelodeon
- You.tv
- Gecko TV
