= David Leckie =

Australian media executive (1951–2021)

David Leckie AM

CEO of Nine Network
- In office 1990–2001

CEO of Seven West Media
- In office 2003–2012

Personal details
- Born: 4 May 1951 Sydney, New South Wales, Australia
- Died: 20 July 2021 (aged 70) Robertson, New South Wales, Australia
- Spouses: Barbara Spence (m. 1978) Skye McLeod (m. 1995)
- Children: Timothy Leckie, Harry Leckie, Ben Leckie
- Parent(s): Ron and Joyce Leckie
- Education: Newington College; Macquarie University
- Occupation: Media executive

David John Leckie AM (4 May 1951 – 20 July 2021) was an Australian media manager, best known as a network television executive. Leckie was the chief executive officer of the Nine Network between 1990 and 2001 and Seven West Media from 2003 to 2012. Afterwards he was for four years an executive director at Seven Group Holdings, which holds investments in Seven West, earthmoving company WesTrac and the Agricultural Bank of China.

== Early life and education ==
Leckie was born in Sydney on 4 May 1951. His father, Ron, was head of the transport division at Unilever having served in the Royal Australian Air Force's 31st Squadron from 1942-1946 where he met his mother Joyce, who served in the Women's Auxiliary Australian Air Force. He was their first child, and he had two brothers, Stuart and Ian. Leckie was raised in the Upper North Shore in the suburb of Pymble. In 1962 he commenced as a student at the Killara Preparatory School of his father’s alma mater Newington College and graduated from the senior school in 1968. He then studied at Macquarie University, graduating with a Bachelor of Arts in economic and financial studies. Afterwards he travelled around Europe, where he also worked for Saatchi & Saatchi in London.

== Career ==
Leckie joined in 1977 the Melbourne branch of Nine, GTV9, where he was network sales manager. From there he rose to network sales director of TCN9 in Sydney, chief executive on TCN9 and thereafter GTV9 in Melbourne. In August 1990 he became successor of Sam Chisholm as managing director of the Nine Network, which was then owned by Alan Bond. After Bond's bankruptcy in 1992 the network returned under the ownership of Kerry Packer. The network then attracted about one-third of Australia's TV audience and roughly 40% of network advertising revenue, which was 400 million dollars in 1988-89. Leckie focused on news and sports and under his leadership the network spent all but six weeks atop the television ratings for the next decade. Nine's dominance over its rivals began to diminish in 2001, when the new ratings system OzTAM, the implementation of which he was instrumental, was established. In January 2002 he was dismissed. He was succeeded by John Alexander and Ian Johnson, who took Nine back to the lead inside six months.

In January 2001 he was appointed for a four-year period as a trustee of the Centennial Park and Moore Park Trust.

Leckie joined the Seven Network in April 2003 at the invitation of Kerry Stokes. He was joined by former Nine program director John Stephens and former Nine head-of-news Peter Meakin. Although it struggled during his first several months at the helm – culminating with a 13-year low in audience share in 2004 – the network's fortunes rebounded after it agreed an output deal with the Walt Disney Company. This enabled Seven to broadcast popular American shows in 2005, such as Desperate Housewives and Lost. A key part of Leckie's success was differentiating the network from Nine, appealing instead to a more casual, suburban audience. He resigned as CEO of Seven West Media in 2012, but continued advising the company for four years. He was brought out of retirement in March 2020 to serve as an executive mentor, including to his protege James Warburton.

== Personal life ==
Leckie's first wife was Barbara Spence (1978-1995). They had a son named Tim. Leckie married his second wife, Skye, in 1995. They met while she was public relations chief at David Jones, and they remained married until his death. Together, they had two children, Harry and Ben.

Leckie cut his finger in a garage door in 2008. This injury led to sepsis, resulting in his being placed in an induced coma at St Vincent's Hospital in Sydney. His health did not completely recover from that infection, and he later scaled back on his engagements in order to recuperate.

Leckie died surrounded by family on the morning of 20 July 2021 in Robertson, New South Wales. He was 70 and had suffered from a lengthy illness prior to his death.

After his death, Leckie was posthumously appointed Member of the Order of Australia in the 2022 Queen's Birthday Honours for "significant service to the broadcast media through executive roles".
