= Bennett Brook Railway =

Tourist oriented railway in Western Australia

Coordinates: 31°50′43″S 115°56′38″E

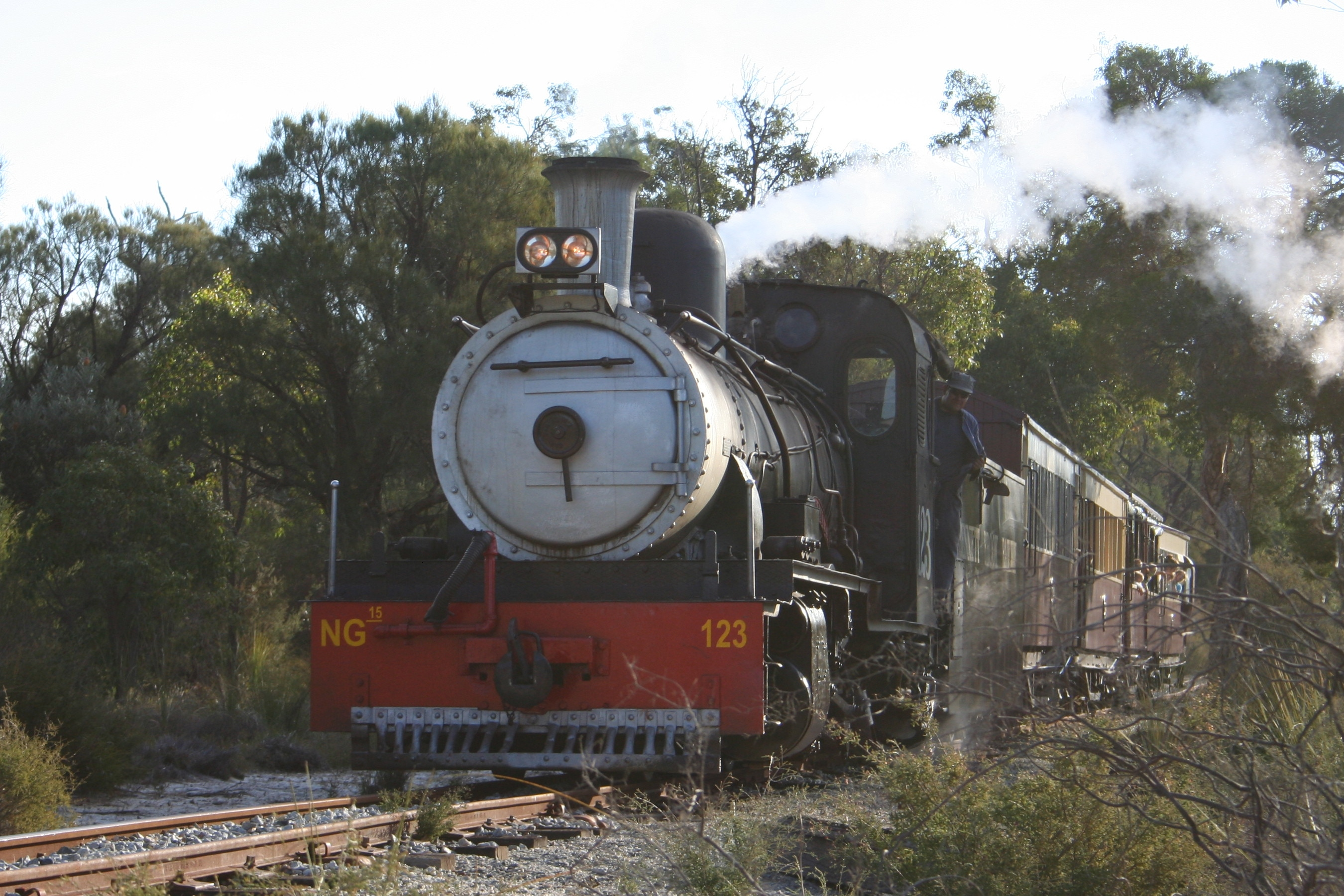

Overview
- Status: Operating as a tourist railway
- Owner: WALRPA
- Locale: Whiteman, Western Australia
- Stations: Whiteman Village Junction (formerly Central); Mussel Pool; Kangaroo Flats; Zamia (formerly Maine)
- Website: bbr.org.au

Service
- Type: Tourist railway
- Operator: WALRPA
- Depot: Mussel Pool workshops

History
- Opened: 1984

Technical
- Line length: ~6 km (3.7 mi)
- Track gauge: 2 ft (610 mm)
- Operating speed: 20 km/h (12 mph)

The Bennett Brook Railway (BBR) is a 2 ft (610 mm) narrow gauge tourist oriented railway operated by the Western Australian Light Railway Preservation Association (WALRPA), and is located within the boundaries of Whiteman Park, 19 kilometres (12 mi) from Perth.

== History ==
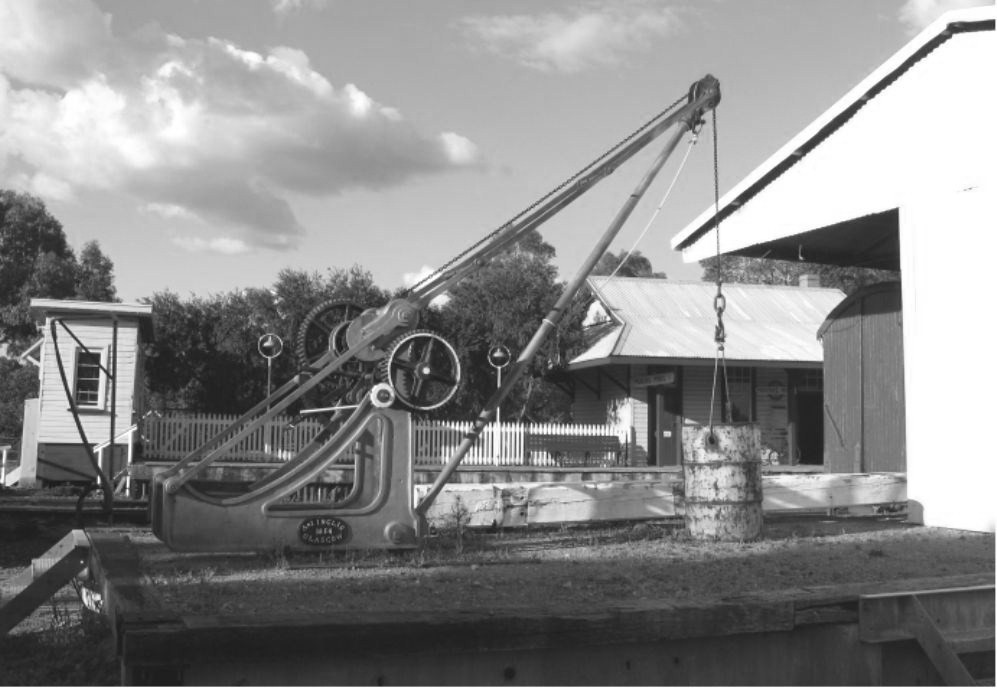
A & J Inglis Crane of 1855 at Bennett Brook Railway

WALRPA was formed on 26 April 1976 by a group of rail enthusiasts who shared an interest in less well-known railways of Western Australia.

Following the closing of the Lake View and Star Gold Mine in Kalgoorlie in the mid-1970s, four of the founding members purchased the railway's first locomotive – an LV&S 'Planet' Locomotive (which still operates at the railway – the Atlantic Planet). The Planet was first located at a member's Perth Hills property on 17 September 1976.

In 1977, the group proposed to develop a railway at Whiteman Park. Five submissions were received in total, three for a 610 mm (2 ft) railway, one for a 7 1/4 in (184 mm) railway, similar to the railway located at Castledare, and finally a submission to re-locate the Australian Railway Historical Society.

From 1977 to 1982, the group also submitted proposals for an operational railway to El Caballo Blanco in Wundowie, the Maylands Peninsula Redevelopment, the former Upper Darling Range railway (from Kalamunda to Goosberry Hill), and a Mandurah tourist development.

The closure of the Bristile & Wunderlich Brickworks in Belmont saw the donation of a number of hoppers and other rail items. The railway acquired a locomotive and a number of hoppers from the Maylands Brickworks.

In 1982, development and restoration continued in the Perth Hills, until 16 August, when WALRPA was advised by Metropolitan Regional Planning Authority that their submission for a 610 mm (2 ft) railway at Whiteman Park had been successful. On 18 September 1982, the first equipment was placed at Whiteman Park.

In 1983, two former Whiteman Brick locomotives – "Ridley 2" and "Yellow Rose" – were acquired.

In June, the C passenger wagons (built on the Maylands Brickworks hoppers) and the Maylands locomotive were moved to Whiteman Park, hauling the first work train on 9 July, and the Planet Locomotive followed on 11 August.

Track laying began on 18 January 1984, and reached Central Station on 18 November the same year. Also in 1984, WALRPA purchased the former Claisebrook railway station to be placed as Central Station (the building arrived in March of that year), acquired an 18-metre (60 ft) turntable from Midland Workshops, and in March they were notified of their success in a tender for two SAR NG15 steam locomotives (#118 & #123).

8 December 1984 was the official opening of the Bennett Brook Railway, and Peter Dowding MLA (the Patron of the Organisation), with some assistance, drove the first passenger train out of Central Station.

== Operations ==
The railway operates passenger services primarily on weekends, public holidays and school holidays, with some midweek services during school terms.

Held biannually, the railway runs a Friends of Ashley Day (formerly known as Friends of Thomas the Tank Engine), which sees most of the railway's volunteers, locomotives and passenger carriages in operation. This is usually held in May and September which sees the start and end of the railway's steam season.

Enthusiast's days are also held occasionally. They are held in winter so there are no restrictions on steam operations. Most operating engines are involved in interesting freight and passenger trains.

== Locomotives ==
September to May is fire season, so diesel engines operate all services.

May to September is steam season, during which steam engines may operate weekend services when available and diesel engines operate all other services.

Dates are approximate and are dependent on park conditions and approval.

Builder	Name	Former operator	Condition	Wheel arrangement	Comments	Coupler(s)	Image
SAR NG15 123 (Built Henschel & Son)	Fremantle	South African Railways	Operational	2-8-2	Current mainstay of steam operations as of 2026.	Jones couplers	
SAR NG15 118 (Built Société Franco-Belge)	Elizabeth	South African Railways	Storage	2-8-2	Stored with major work needed to be carried out.	Jones couplers	A large preserved steam engine.
Perry	Betty Thompson	Inkerman Sugar Mill, QLD	Stored	0-4-2T	Privately owned locomotive, now out of traffic with boiler ticket due to expire as of 2026.	Jones couplers	
Perry		Marian Sugar Mill, QLD	Storage	0-6-2T	Awaiting overhaul.	Link and pin	Steam engine with a sugarcane train.
O&K Mallet No. 3		Magnet Tramway, TAS	Maintenance	0-4-4-0T	Restoration due to start.	Link and pin	Men pose in front of an old steam engine.
Krauss		Multiple. Previous - Western Machinery, WA	Storage	0-4-0WT	Cosmetic restoration currently in progress.	Link and pin	

=== Large diesel locomotives ===
Builder	Name	Former operator	Condition	Wheel arrangement	Comments	Coupler(s)	Image
1939 Planet	Planet 7	Lake View and Star Gold Mine, WA	Operational	0-4-0	First locomotive bought by the society, number 7 is the current mainstay of diesel operations.	Jones couplers, Link and pin	
1937 Planet		Lake View and Star Gold Mine, WA	Storage	0-4-0	Sister to number 7, acquired in February 2024 courtesy of the Boulder Loop Line museum.	Link and pin	
1968 Planet (Dorman Engine)	Dorman	Lake View and Star Gold Mine, WA	Maintenance	0-4-0	Privately owned locomotive, awaiting new wheelsets.	Jones couplers, Link and pin	
Gemco Funkey PW27	Wyndham	Wyndham Jetty, WA	Maintenance	0-4-0	Awaiting a new gearbox, her return to service is unknown.	Jones couplers	
Fowler #2	Rosalie	Isis Central Sugar Mill, QLD	Operational	0-6-0	In 2020, a new drive train, motor and transmission were donated from a garbage truck. Finished in a new livery reminiscent of her original Isis mill paint in 2021.	Jones couplers	

=== Small locomotives ===
Builder	Name	Former operator	Condition	Wheel arrangement	Comments	Couplers	Image
Kless	Ashley	"The Big Orange", WA	Operational	0-4-0D		Link and pin	
Ruston & Hornsby Type LBT		Manjimup Mill, WA	Maintenance	4wdDM	Currently in need of mechanical work.	Jones couplers, Link and pin	
Maylands Brickworks (Planet Frame)	Maylands	Maylands Brickworks, WA	Operational	4wPM	Maylands was the first operational locomotive on site, powered by a Holden Red 6 cylinder engine and an automatic car transmission.	Link and pin	
Planet Type Y	Yellow Rose	Whitemans Brick, WA	Operational	4wPM	In late 2025, a new radiator was sourced for the locomotive, requiring a new bonnet to be built.	Link and pin	
Whiteman Brick (Harold Ridley Designed)	Ridley	Whitemans Brick, WA	Storage	4wPM	Entering service in 1984 with a new Vanguard motor fitted, Ridley would later be re-engined and paired with a ballast Tamper, and further rebuilt with a new body.	Link and pin	
Whiteman Brick (Harold Ridley Designed)	Ridley #2	Whitemans Brick, WA	Storage	2-2w + 2w-2PM	Current whereabouts unknown.	Link and pin	

== Carriages and wagons ==
=== Passenger carriages ===
==== Large stock ====
All fitted with Jones couplers

Class	Number	Original class	Original operator	Description	Comments	Entered service
AQ	4745	QBB	WAGR	Fitted with window glazing. Concertina fitted at both ends	BBR Built on QBB Chassis. Part of Winter Stock.	1986
AQ	1788	QBB	WAGR	Mostly in original construction condition, no glazing of the windows. Rebuilt doors, concertina fitted at both ends	BBR Built on QBB Chassis. Part of Winter Stock.	1986
AQB	2790	QBB	WAGR	Fitted With Guards Compartment	BBR Built on QBB Chassis. Part of Winter Stock	1986
AV	3251	V	WAGR	Party Coach. Fitted with tables and seats, a Bar servery area and a Brake Instrument	BBR Built on V Chassis	1989
AR	1638	R	WAGR	Wheelchair access. Fitted with "Roll Up" windows. Fitted with concertinas at both end. No fixed seating	BBR Built on R Chassis. Part of Winter Stock	1995
R	3644	R	WAGR	Fitted with a Roof wooden seats for passenger seating. Fitted with concertinas at both ends. "Drop" side doors modified for passenger access	Part of Summer Stock	1990
RP	1783	R	WAGR	Fitted with a Roof, wooden seats for passenger seating. Fitted with concertinas at both ends. "Drop" side doors modified for passenger access	Part of Summer Stock	1990
RP	4461	R	WAGR	Fitted with a Roof, wooden seats for passenger seating. "Drop" side doors modified for passenger access	Reputed to be the only remaining example of a WAGR 4 Door R wagon. Part of Summer Stock	1990
Z	63	V	WAGR	Brake Van	Replica Z wagon, built by BBR on an ex WAGR V Wagon (V3263) Chassis. Brake van on Summer Stock.	
R	1751	R	WAGR	Grey Open Wagon with No Roof, wooden seats for passenger seating. "Drop" side doors modified for passenger access	Part of Summer Stock	2015
ZB	213	ZB	WAGR	First Class Coach ZB wagon, built by BBR on an ex WAGR ZB First Class Coach (ZB213) Chassis. Green Brake van with First Class Compartment and Baggage Compartment	2021	

==== Small stock ====
All fitted with link and pin couplers

Designator	Built from/on	Description	Comments	Entered service
ALV4	Maylands Clay Pit chassis	4 Wheelchair Accessible Passenger Carriage Air braked	Currently used for wheelchairs	2021
C3	Maylands Clay Pit chassis	4 Wheel Passenger Carriage	Restored to operational service on a "Citra" chassis for BBR's 21st Birthday celebrations in 2005	1983
BV1	Lake View and Star Goldmine Ore hopper Chassis	4 Wheel Passenger Brake Carriage	Air braked and Fitted with Brake wheel in Guards Compartment. Still operational	1984
ALV11	Lake View and Star Goldmine Ore hopper Chassis	Air braked 4 Wheel Passenger Carriage	Still operational	1985
ALV12	Lake View and Star Goldmine Ore hopper Chassis	air braked 4 Wheel Passenger Carriage	Still operational	1985
ADL101		Toast Rack Style Passenger Carriages	Originally built in Harvey for the Big Orange Railway. Transported to BBR in 2004 and purchased in 2020	2006
ADL102		Toast Rack Style Passenger Carriages	Originally built in Harvey for the Big Orange Railway. Transported to BBR in 2004 and purchased in 2020	2006
ADL103		Toast Rack Style Passenger Carriages	Originally built in Harvey for the Big Orange Railway. Transported to BBR in 2004 and purchased in 2020	

=== Freight/industrial wagons ===
All Wagons are fitted with Jones couplers, unless said otherwise.

Class	Number	Original operator	Description	Comments
D	33	WAGR	Covered Goods Van	Restored, and reinstalled on LA Chassis (Used on work trains)
QBB	2889	WAGR	Flat Wagon, used to carry heavy and often large loads about the railway	To Carry Coal Bunkers for BT1 Betty Thompson
LA	23778	WAGR	Ballast Hopper	Used on work trains
JOA	12051	WAGR	Distillate Fuel Tanker	Used as a water tanker Needs Maintenance
J	11374	WAGR	Water Tanker	Used as a water gin for NG15 123 Fremantle
V	3326	WAGR	Goods Van	Currently to store equipment in and used on work trains

== Buildings ==
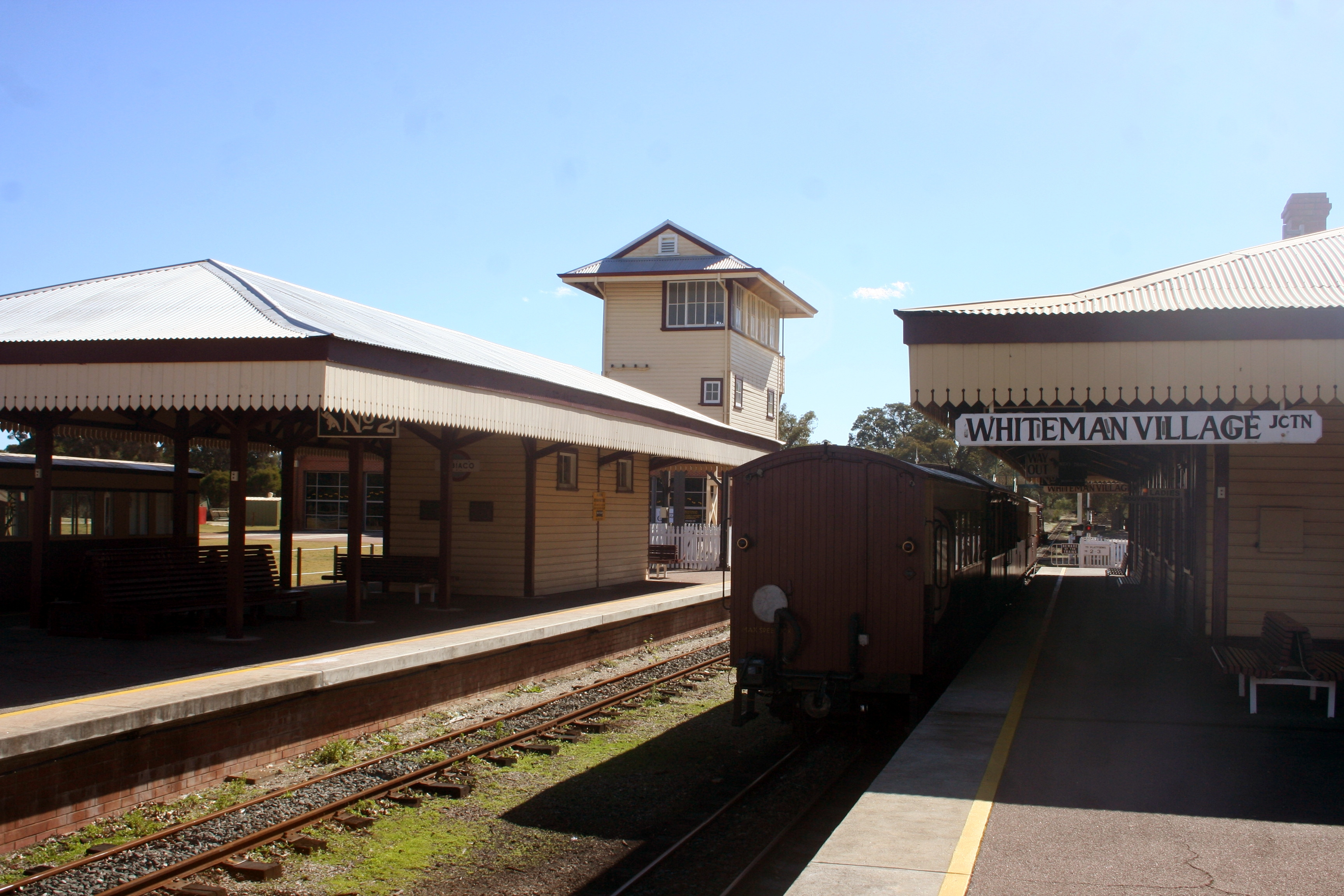
Whiteman Village Junction Station, with the former Subiaco Signal Cabin in the background

At the Bennett Brook Railway, all buildings used on the line (with the exclusion of the yards) are former WAGR/Westrail station buildings.

Whiteman Village Junction Station houses the former station buildings from Claisebrook Station (Platform 1/Ticket Office), Subiaco Station (Platform 2/3, Party Room), and signal cabins from Subiaco and Fremantle (both are currently not operational). At Mussel Pool the station building is from Nungarin (transported to BBR in 1989 with assistance from the Australian Army's 22nd Construction Squadron). There are also two signal cabins from Collie (no longer operational, now located at Parker Siding), and Cottesloe, which is fully operational located at the northern end of the Mussel Pool platform.

== Signalling and safeworking ==
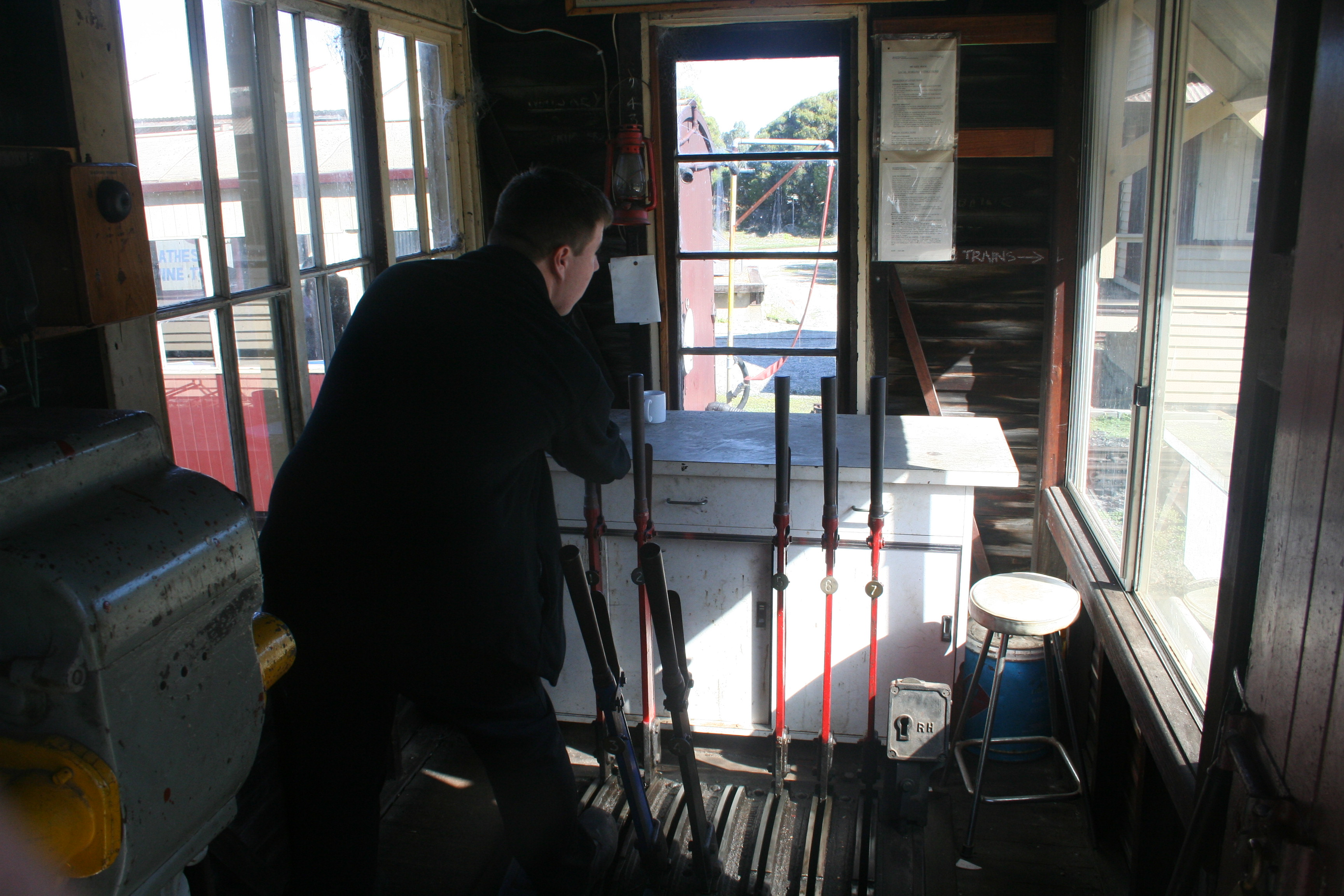
The former Mussel Pool signal cabin, from Collie, in use

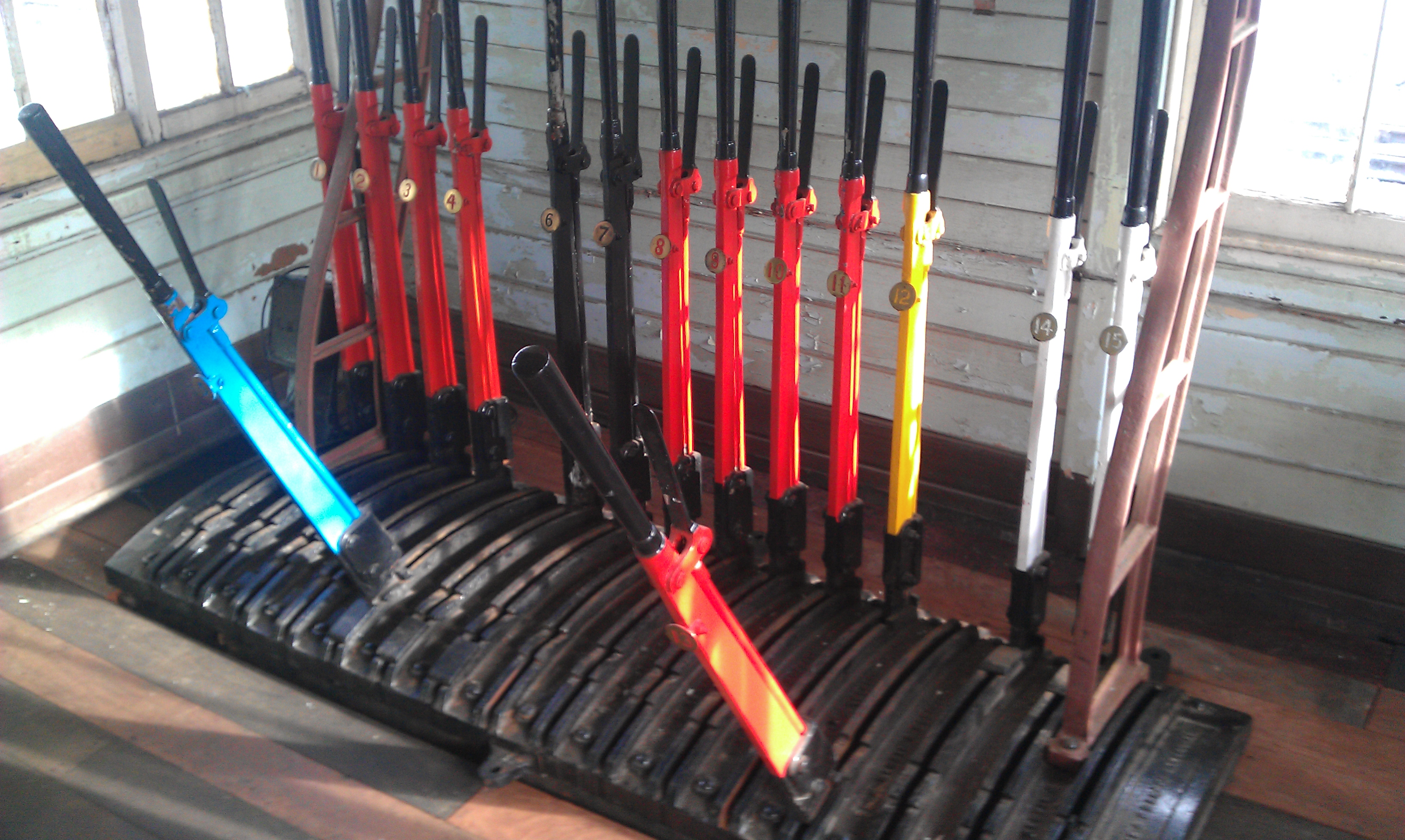
The ex-Wagin lever frame, now installed in the Cottesloe Cabin at Mussel Pool

Located at Mussel Pool, the original Cottesloe Cabin (1897–1931) is in place on the station platform, and is fully operational. In the Cottesloe Cabin stands the former Wagin lever frame; with 15 levers this frame turned out to be the perfect size for the Mussel Pool station. 13 of the 15 levers in the frame are used, for 3 sets of points and locks, and 12 signals. The cabin is used mostly on weekends during run-arounds at Mussel Pool station, however during large events the cabin is used to assist sorting and preparing trains at the start of the event.

BBR uses the Staff and Ticket System for section authority on the Bushland Loop (Red Staff) and electric staff (Yellow) on Mussel Pool Branch. To travel on a section of line, the driver of a locomotive must be in possession of the relevant staff. Using staff and ticket, in the case of multiple trains needing to use one section of track, the staff unlocks a box located in the signal cabins at each end of the section, which hold the tickets. A ticket would be filled out and given to the driver of the lead consist, who would also be shown the staff. After the average time to complete the section has passed, the second train can depart the station, proceeding with caution in case the train ahead has broken down, holding both the staff (or another ticket) and a notice of train ahead.

In 1997 an Electric Staff system was introduced on the Mussel Pool to Whiteman Village Junction section, with staff instruments located in the signal cabins at both stations. At the same time a wired telephone line was introduced between the two stations, using telegraph poles. With electric staff working, the driver carries a staff withdrawn from the staff machine thereby locking the machines at each end of the line from releasing another staff. When the train reaches the end of the section, the staff is placed in the machine at the terminating end and both machines are unlocked allowing another staff to be removed.

BBR completed installation of electric point motors on all mainline points in 2021, electrically operated semaphore signals at the north end and searchlight coloured light signals at the southern end of Whiteman Village Junction. Operation of the points and signals are controlled from cubicles located at ground level. In 2021 Work started on the configuration of the elevated signal cabin (ex-Subiaco) to control train movements at Whiteman Village Junction. On September 20 2026 , the cabin was commissioned and is able to be switched in as required disconnecting the ground level cubicles.

== Publications of BBR/WALRPA ==
- Western Rails (1977–1990)
- Rusty Rails (1982–1994)
- Bennett Brook Railway (2003–) electronic resource
- Swan Valley's Bennett Brook Railway members newsletter (1998–2004) and (2007–2010)
- Shed : the newsletter of the Bennett Brook Railway. (undated one edition 2007 or 2006 ?)
- The Bennett Brook railway worker (2004–2006)
- Bennett Brook Railway newsletter (2011– ?)
- The Bennett Brooklet (2012 ? – present )

== See also ==
- Perth Electric Tramway Society
