= James Warburton (businessman) =

Australian businessman

- Born: 1970 (age 55–56)
- Occupation: Businessman

James Warburton (born 1970) is an Australian businessman. He has served as the Chief Executive Officer of Seven West Media and Supercars.

== Career ==
=== Television executive ===
Warburton had early executive roles at McCann-Erickson, DDB Worldwide and Hyundai in the 1980s and 1990s. Warburton became Managing Director of Universal McCann in 2000, winning and retaining multiple significant government and corporate contracts over the following three years.

In 2003, Warburton took on his first role in the television industry, becoming sales director of the Seven Network. In 2011, Warburton was poached by Lachlan Murdoch to become CEO of Network 10. Seven launched a legal challenge to the defection and the Supreme Court of New South Wales ruled that Warburton could not start at Ten until 1 January 2012, five months later than scheduled. After less than 14 months in the role, Warburton was sacked and replaced by Hamish McLennan.

=== Supercars ===
In May 2013, Warburton was announced as CEO of Supercars and remained in the role until 2017, in which time Warburton was credited with stabilising the business and signing long-term television and title sponsorship deals for the sport. Warburton later continued his association with motorsport, taking on a non-executive director role in 2019 with the Australian Racing Group, promoters of series including TCR Australia Touring Car Series and the Australian S5000 Championship.

=== APN Outdoor ===
After leaving the renamed Supercars Championship in 2017, Warburton joined APN Outdoor as CEO in January 2018. He left the company after it was taken over by JCDecaux ten months later. In 2019, Warburton launched a consultancy business and took a stake in the Shopper Media Group, joining its board.

=== Return to Seven West Media ===
Warburton returned to Seven in 2019 as Managing Director and CEO of Seven West Media, replacing Tim Worner. Soon after, Warburton launched a significant restructure of the business. In 2023 it was announced that Warburton would be stepping down as managing director and CEO of Seven West Media, and chief financial officer Jeff Howard had been appointed as his replacement. He left Seven West Media in April 2024.

=== Tinybeans ===
In July 2024, Warburton joined the board of photo sharing app company Tinybeans as a non-executive director.

=== Return to Supercars ===
Warburton returned to Supercars as CEO in July 2025, leaving in April 2026.

== Personal life ==
Warburton is married to Nikki Warburton, the chief customer and marketing officer of Audi Australia.
