= Kerry Stokes =

Australian businessman (born 1940)

Kerry Stokes AC
- Born: John Patrick Alford; 13 September 1940 (age 86); Melbourne, Victoria, Australia
- Occupation: Businessman
- Years active: 1960–present
- Board member of: Australian Capital Equity (Chair); Seven Group Holdings (Chair); Seven Network (Chair); Seven Media Group (Chair); Seven West Media (Chair); Southern Cross Media Group (Chair); Australian War Memorial (Chair)
- Spouses: Dorothy Ebert (m. 1960; div. 1970); Denise Stokes (div. 1988); Peta Toppano (m. 1992; div. 1995); Christine Simpson (m. 1996)
- Children: 4

Kerry Matthew Stokes (born John Patrick Alford on 13 September 1940) is an Australian businessman. He holds business interests in industries including electronic and print media, property, gas, oil, mining and construction equipment. He is most widely known as the chairman of the Seven Network, one of the largest broadcasting corporations in Australia.

Appointed an Officer of the Order of Australia (AO) in 1995, Stokes was appointed a Companion of the Order of Australia (AC) in 2006 in recognition of his contributions to Australian business, strategic leadership, promotion of corporate social responsibility, to the arts through philanthropy, and to the community, most especially those services supporting young people.

== Early life ==
John Patrick Alford was born in Melbourne, Victoria. His unmarried mother was Marie Jean Alford. Stokes was adopted by Matthew and Irene Stokes and grew up in Camp Pell, a slum housing area. He later dropped out of school at age 14. In June 2000, Stokes told the ABC, "My background was very difficult, very hard and I wouldn't wish that on anybody. I had lots of different occupations and obviously lots of different experiences. I had some time on the street, and sometimes, work was very difficult. Australia, in that period of time, wasn't a place where you could actually easily go and get a job, it was difficult, and we went where there was work available".

== Career ==
Stokes' first reported job was to install television antennas in Perth, followed by a sustained period in property development throughout the 1960s and 1970s. He also developed a range of shopping centres in Perth and regional Western Australia with partners Jack Bendat and Kevin Merifield.

His private company, Australian Capital Equity, is the holding company for Stokes' interests in a diverse range of Australian and international businesses and ventures covering property, construction, mining and petroleum exploration.

He invested in the Caterpillar franchise in Western Australia (Wigmores Ltd) in 1988, and the company subsequently called WesTrac has equipment dealer franchises in Western Australia, New South Wales and the Australian Capital Territory, with the total number of employees close to 4,000 people, as well as 500 apprentices in Australia.

In 2007, Stokes' National Hire Group (over 50% owned by WesTrac) formed a joint venture with The Carlyle Group to acquire the equipment hire group Coates Hire.

Stokes has always had a keen interest in the pastoral industry and acquired the 4,047-square-kilometre (1,563 sq mi) Napier Downs station in the Kimberley, stocked with 20,000 head of Red Brahman cattle, from Peter Leutenegger in 2015 for an estimated A$23 million to A$40 million.

As of 2017, Seven Group Holdings increased the size of Stokes' privately owned cattle empire in Western Australia to more than 1 million ha (2.47 million acres).

=== Media interests ===
Stokes's commercial interests in the media sector commenced in Western Australia, with the development of the Golden West Network, a regional television network based in Bunbury in partnership with Jack Bendat. In 1979 Stokes acquired Canberra's local TV station Seven Canberra, subsequently acquiring Seven Adelaide from Rupert Murdoch and winning the third commercial station licence in Perth, as well as acquiring radio stations in Victoria (including 3DB (Melbourne) and 3GL (Geelong), South Australia and Western Australia, through a vehicle called BDC. These assets were sold to Frank Lowy in 1987.

In 1996 Stokes acquired a strategic 19 per cent stake in the Seven Network (now approximately 43 per cent), a network of commercial free-to-air television stations in Sydney, Melbourne, Brisbane and Adelaide, as well as regional Queensland and Perth. This was supported by Alan Jackson, who Stokes appointed CEO of the company for a number of years. The platform, as well as a 33 per cent stake in Sky News Australia, reaches 98 per cent of Australians. Seven has also established a major magazine publishing business, Pacific Magazines, which accounts for more than 20 per cent of all magazines sold in Australia.

Also under Stokes's leadership, Seven has established a leading online venture, Yahoo!7, combining Yahoo!'s search and online capabilities with Seven's content and cross marketing. The successful joint venture is driving a range of online and IPTV businesses. Seven built and acquired several broadband businesses, including wireless broadband group Unwired (sold to Optus, and subsequently defunct), VOIP operator Engin (subsequently an independent business) and was the Australian licensee for TiVo, launched in 2008 and abandoned in 2014.

In 2006, Seven Network and KKR created a new joint venture, Seven Media Group, a multi-faceted media company combining a presence in broadcast television, magazine and online applications. West Australian Newspapers Ltd. merged with Seven to form Seven West Media in 2011.

Stokes's private company, in conjunction with Shanghai People's Press, is no longer running a business after five years in Shanghai. and a second joint venture in mobile television with the Oriental Pearl Group in Shanghai. Seven held the Australian broadcasting rights for the 2008 Summer Olympics in Beijing and provided the broadcast feeds for the swimming and diving events for the rest of the world. The International Olympic Committee awarded Seven the gold medal for its TV coverage of the Athens Summer Olympics in 2004.

In September 2025, the Seven Network announced that they would merge with the Southern Cross Media Group, with Stokes later being elevated to the position of chair and then stepping down from the board entirely in February 2025 with the role of chair then going to Heith Mackay-Cruise.

=== Fossil fuel interests ===
Stokes is a major shareholder and Chair of Seven Group Holdings (SGH Ltd) which has subsidiary SGH Energy, and holds major shareholdings in Beach Energy. SGH Energy is the energy division of SGH, holding a 15.5% interest in the Shell-operated Crux gas and condensate field in the Browse Basin (AC/L10 permit), and a 100% interest in the Longtom gas and condensate field in Bass Strait, Victoria.

Beach Energy (ASX:BPT) is an oil and natural gas producer founded in 1961 with operations across five producing basins in Australia and New Zealand. Beach Energy is a key supplier to the Australian east coast gas market, with ownership interests in strategic infrastructure including the Moomba processing facility, Waitsia gas plant, and Otway Gas Plant, alongside a portfolio of exploration prospects.

== Personal life ==
Stokes has been married four times. His first marriage was to Dorothy "Dot" Ebert, who is the mother of two of his children, Russell and Raelene. In an interview with The Bulletin, it was implied that Stokes was estranged from his first family. His second marriage was to his receptionist, Denise Bryant, with whom he had two sons. Denise walked out of the marriage and went overseas, and Stokes became a single father. His third marriage was to Australian television actress Peta Toppano in 1992. This marriage lasted for three years. In 1996 he married his fourth wife, Christine Simpson, a newsreader for rival station Channel 10 when they first met. Stokes has at least four grandchildren.

=== Net worth ===
As of May 2025, the Australian Financial Review assessed Stokes' net worth as A$12.69 billion, the tenth-richest Australian; and he was one of seven Australians who have appeared in every Financial Review Rich List, or its predecessor, the BRW Rich 200, since it was first published in 1984.

In 2019, Forbes assessed Stokes' net worth as US$2.90 billion.

Year	Financial Review Rich List		Forbes Australia's 50 Richest	
Year	Rank	Net worth (A$)	Rank	Net worth (US$)
2015	16	$2.113 billion	23 ▼	$1.20 billion ▼
2016			27 ▼	$1.00 billion ▼
2017	14	$2.90 billion ▲	14 ▲	$2.60 billion ▼
2018	13 ▲	$4.93 billion ▲		$3.10 billion ▲
2019	11 ▲	$5.69 billion ▲	12 ▲	$2.90 billion ▼
2020	10 ▲	$6.26 billion ▲		
2021	13 ▼	$7.18 billion ▲		
2022	12 ▲	$7.00 billion ▼		
2023	12	$7.45 billion ▲		
2024	12	$11.30 billion ▲		
2025	10 ▲	$12.69 billion ▲		

Legend
Icon	Description
Steady	Has not changed from the previous year
▲	Has increased from the previous year
▼	Has decreased from the previous year

=== Philanthropy ===
In 1995 Stokes was appointed an Officer of the Order of Australia (AO) for service to business and commerce to the arts and to the community. In 2008 Stokes was appointed a Companion of the Order of Australia (AC) for service to business and commerce through strategic leadership and promotion of corporate social responsibility, to the arts through executive roles and philanthropy, and to the community, particularly through contributions to organisations supporting youth. His passionate interest in art coincides with his long association with the National Gallery of Australia, where he served as chairman for several years and has made multimillion-dollar donations.

He has also been awarded the Rotary Paul Harris Fellow Award by Rotary International and holds a life membership of the Returned and Services League of Australia, on whose behalf Stokes has acquired three Victoria Crosses, as well as other medals. These medals have been added to the collection of the Australian War Memorial in Canberra. He now sits on the council of the War Memorial.

In November 2012, Stokes was named Western Australia's Australian of the Year for his extensive philanthropic contributions to Australian society. In 1994, Stokes delivered the Boyer Lectures, a series of five lectures broadcast annually on ABC radio. His series was entitled "Advance Australia Where?" on the topic of the Information Superhighway. He delivered the Andrew Olle Media Lecture in October 2001.

==== Victoria Cross ====
Stokes has taken an active role in preserving Australian ownership of significant military heritage; he has now purchased three Australian Victoria Cross medal sets, and a George Cross medal set. Stokes has purchased all four sets via auction from Bonhams & Goodman of Sydney, Australia. The first was the VC medal set of Captain Alfred John Shout, paying a world record price of A$1.2 million on 24 July 2006. In the same auction, he purchased the GC medal set of Lieutenant Commander George Gosse for A$180,000. On 28 November of the same year, Stokes purchased the VC set of Lance Corporal Bernard Gordon for A$478,000. He donated all three sets to the Australian War Memorial.

On 20 May 2008, Stokes, in conjunction with the South Australian Government, purchased the Victoria Cross medal set of Major Peter Badcoe for A$480,000. The Badcoe medals were on public display in the South Australian Museum in Adelaide, and on tour in South Australia, for twelve months before going on display at the Australian War Memorial in Canberra.

== Controversy ==
On 23 April 2020, during the global COVID-19 pandemic, Stokes and his wife, Christine Simpson, were granted quarantine within their own home after returning from a skiing trip in Colorado instead of in a hotel on medical grounds. However, it was unclear why Simpson was also given an exemption to strict State and Federal laws at the time.

After Seven Network employee and former soldier Ben Roberts-Smith sued the publishers of The Age, The Sydney Morning Herald and The Canberra Times for defamation, it was reported in 2020 that Stokes’ private investment company, Australian Capital Equity, had extended a line of credit to Roberts-Smith of around A$2 million to help fund his legal case. Roberts-Smith reportedly offered his Victoria Cross medal as collateral for the loan. On 1 June 2023 Australian federal court Judge Anthony Besanko dismissed the case, ruling that, on the balance of probabilities, the papers had established substantial or contextual truth of allegations of war crimes committed by Roberts-Smith. It was reported that in addition to agreeing to cover Roberts-Smith legal costs of an estimated $15 million, Stokes will also make a significant contribution to cover the defendant's costs of an estimated $13 million; and possibly cover both parties costs for the appeal, estimated to be $5 million.
