= Boral =

Australian building and construction material company

Boral Limited
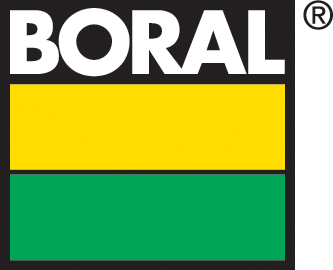
- Company type: Subsidiary
- Traded as: ASX: BLD
- Industry: Building and construction materials
- Founded: 4 March 1946
- Founder: David Craig
- Headquarters: North Ryde, New South Wales, Australia
- Key people: Ryan Stokes (chairman); Vik Bansal (CEO & managing director)
- Products: Concrete; quarry materials; cement; asphalt; recycled materials
- Revenue: $3.46 billion (2023)
- Operating income: $232 million (2023)
- Parent: Seven Group Holdings
- Website: boral.com.au

Boral Limited is an Australian building and construction materials company. It is owned by Seven Group Holdings.

== History ==
Boral was founded by David Craig on 4 March 1946 as Bitumen and Oil Refineries (Australia) Limited with Caltex having a 40% shareholding. In March 1947, it opened Matraville Refinery, Australia's first bitumen and oil refinery. In 1963, the company was renamed Boral Limited having been commonly referred to by its acronym since it commenced trading. In 1964, it purchased the Gas Supply Company with 28 coal gas companies in New South Wales, Queensland and Victoria. In 1968 Boral sold a 50% stake in its refining business to Total, before selling it the remainder in January 1972. In 1969, it entered the building materials industry through a number of acquisitions.

In 1979, Boral entered the United States market, purchasing a 55% shareholding in California Tile from Amalco. In February 1987 Boral purchased cement manufacturer Blue Circle Southern Cement from BHP and Blue Circle Industries. In 1990, Midland Brick was purchased.

In January 2000, Boral sold its tyre business to Bridgestone. In February 2000, Boral's energy assets were spun off into a separate listed entity, Origin Energy.

In December 2020, Boral sold Midland Brick to BGC. This followed Boral selling its bricks business on Australia's east coast in 2016.

In April 2021, Boral divested its plasterboard business, completing the process with the sale of its 50 per cent interest in the USG Boral joint venture to Knauf for US$1 billion. In May 2021, Seven Group Holdings launched a takeover offer. In June 2021, Boral sold its United States operations to Westlake Chemical.

In July 2021, Seven gained control of Boral with a 70% shareholding. In February 2024, Seven Group Holdings launched a takeover offer for the remainder of the shares it did not own. It was rejected by Boral's board. After revising the offer, Seven Group Holdings gained full ownership of Boral in July 2024 and the company was delisted from the ASX.
