= Lew Whiteman =

Australian businessman and collector (1903–1994)

- Whiteman photographed by Richard Woldendorp, c. 1985
- Born: Manton Lewis Cyril Whiteman; 9 July 1903; Jane Brook, Western Australia
- Died: 1 March 1994 (aged 90); Woodlands, Western Australia
- Occupations: Businessman, collector
- Known for: Namesake of Whiteman Park

Manton Lewis Cyril Whiteman (9 July 1903 – 1 March 1994) was an Australian businessman and collector. He owned Whitemans Brick and is the namesake of Whiteman Park.

== Early life and brickworks career ==
Whiteman was born on 9 July 1903 in Jane Brook, Western Australia, north-east of Perth. He was the third child of Elizabeth (née Barndon) and Lewis Whiteman. His father was born in England and worked as a brickmaker whereas his mother was born in Western Australia. Whiteman attended school in Middle Swan until he was fourteen, when he began working at his father's business, Middle Swan Brickworks (later known as Whitemans Brickworks or Whitemans Brick). In 1941, Whiteman's father died and he took over the business. In 1966, the business was sold to Alan Bond's Progress Development Organisation, and it was later acquired by Midland Brick.

== Properties ==
Before World War II, Whiteman had purchased a farm in an area of the Swan Valley which later became Whiteman Park. He subsequently purchased some adjacent land to use for cattle and horses. In 1954, he purchased three adjacent properties in Guildford where he could live and store his collection of "antiques and curios".

In the 1960s, he developed his Swan Valley property by damming the Bennett Brook and deepening a natural pool along the brook, naming it Mussel Pool due to the natural occurrence of freshwater mussels. The area became a public picnic ground and a place to display his collection of agricultural machinery, including horse-drawn machinery and tractors. The Government of Western Australia purchased the Mussel Pool property in 1977 and the adjacent properties later. Whiteman Park was officially opened and named in 1986.

== Later life ==
Whiteman died in Woodlands on 1 March 1994. He was cremated. The vehicles in his collection were bequeathed to the people of Western Australia, and are on display at Whiteman Park. The rest of his collection was auctioned, with the money raised going to Princess Margaret Hospital for Children.
