= NG15 =

NG15 or NG-15 may refer to:

- Cygnus NG-15, the fifteenth launch of the Northrop Grumman robotic resupply spacecraft Cygnus
- NG15 postcode district, a postcode district in the county of Nottinghamshire, England, United Kingdom
- South African Class NG15 2-8-2, a class of 2 foot gauge steam locomotives originating in South Africa
