= Sandstone Estates =

Large commercial agricultural enterprise

Coordinates: 28.8449°S 28.0024°E

Sandstone Estates (Pty) Ltd is a large commercial agricultural enterprise covering over 7,000 hectares (17,000 acres), located on the border with Lesotho in South Africa's Eastern Free State province, close to the Maluti Mountains. The nearest town is Ficksburg, 14 kilometres (8.7 mi) away on the R26. It is a hub of transport preservation.

== History ==
The farm was built up by the Wille family from the 1830s, who were originally German missionaries. Today it is part of an international agri-business that produces wheat, soya beans, maize and sunflowers. It has been 100% organic since 2005.

As steam enthusiasts, in the mid-1990s, the Sandstone owners were approached by Alan Clarke of Transnet Heritage Foundation, who realised the foundation did not have the resources to rescue the collapsing Midmar Museum in KwaZulu-Natal. The collection formed the basis of what became the Sandstone Heritage collection. Today, the main collection is still based around the railway transport of Southern Africa, but also covers an extensive global road transport and military vehicle collection.

The "Stars of Sandstone" 10-day event held in March, April or May attracts thousands of visitors, 70% of whom are from overseas.

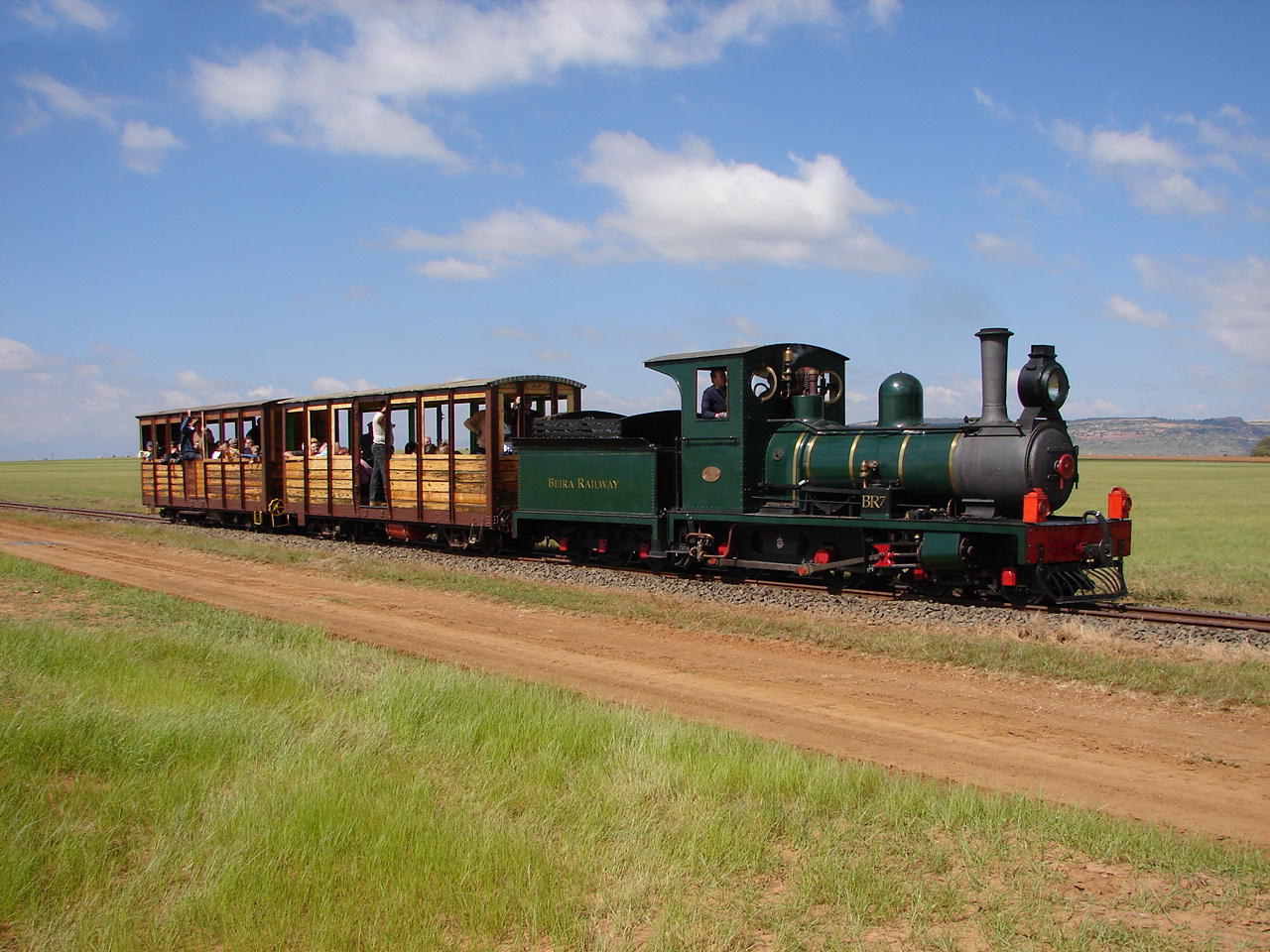
Falcon Engine works number 232/1895, restored as Beira Railway number 7, April 2006

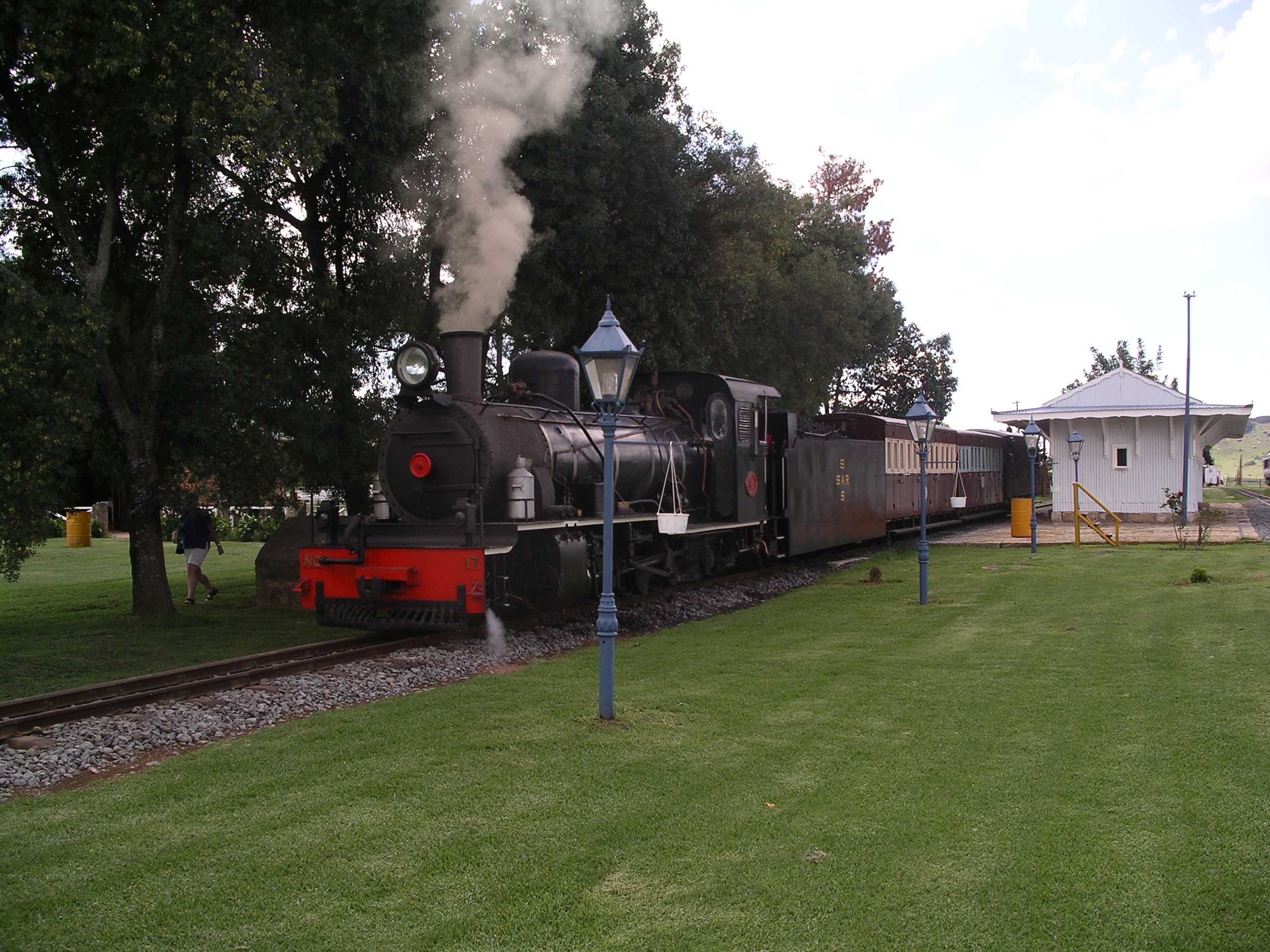
Henschel-built South African Railways NG15 2-8-2 No.17 leaves a station at Sandstone Estates, February 2005

=== Agricultural machinery ===
Old tractors which had been on the farm for many years were retained, and added to by donated items. Today the collection runs to over 300 tractors, all were slowly restored to operation.

=== Railways ===
The 2ft Narrow gauge railway runs from Grootdraai in the south, and then northwards to the main farm and main depot at Hoekfontein, onwards via Mooihoek to Vailima Siding.Today the collection of 2 ft (610 mm) narrow gauge locomotives and rolling stock is one of the most numerous in the world.

During the 1990s Sandstone took occupancy of the old South African Railways workshops at Ficksburg, located alongside the Transnet Freight Rail Bethlehem to Bloemfontein line. As well as acting as a collection and restoration point, it also acted as a training college for local young people, who were trained through the restoration process. This facility is now closed and returned to Transnet.

Sandstone operated a major locomotive refurbishment programme at its Bloemfontein workshops. This was located in the old Steam Depot which was the home of constant Steam activity for many decades. It is now closed.

Sandstone has 24 working 2ft Narrow Gauge locomotives. A number of 3'6" gauge locomotives are also on permanent display at Sandstone.

=== Military ===
Sandstone formed a joint-venture with the South African Army's Armour Museum in Bloemfontein, which led to the development of a significant collection of vintage military vehicles. The collection is built around educating visitors on the history of South African military engineering since World War II.

The School of Armour plays an important role in the semi-annual "Stars of Sandstone" event, with daily displays and convoys of military vehicles.

== See also ==
- Alfred County Railway
- Avontuur Railway
- Welsh Highland Railway
- Two foot gauge railways in South Africa
