= Seven West Media =

Australian media company

Seven West Media Limited
- Current logo used from 2020

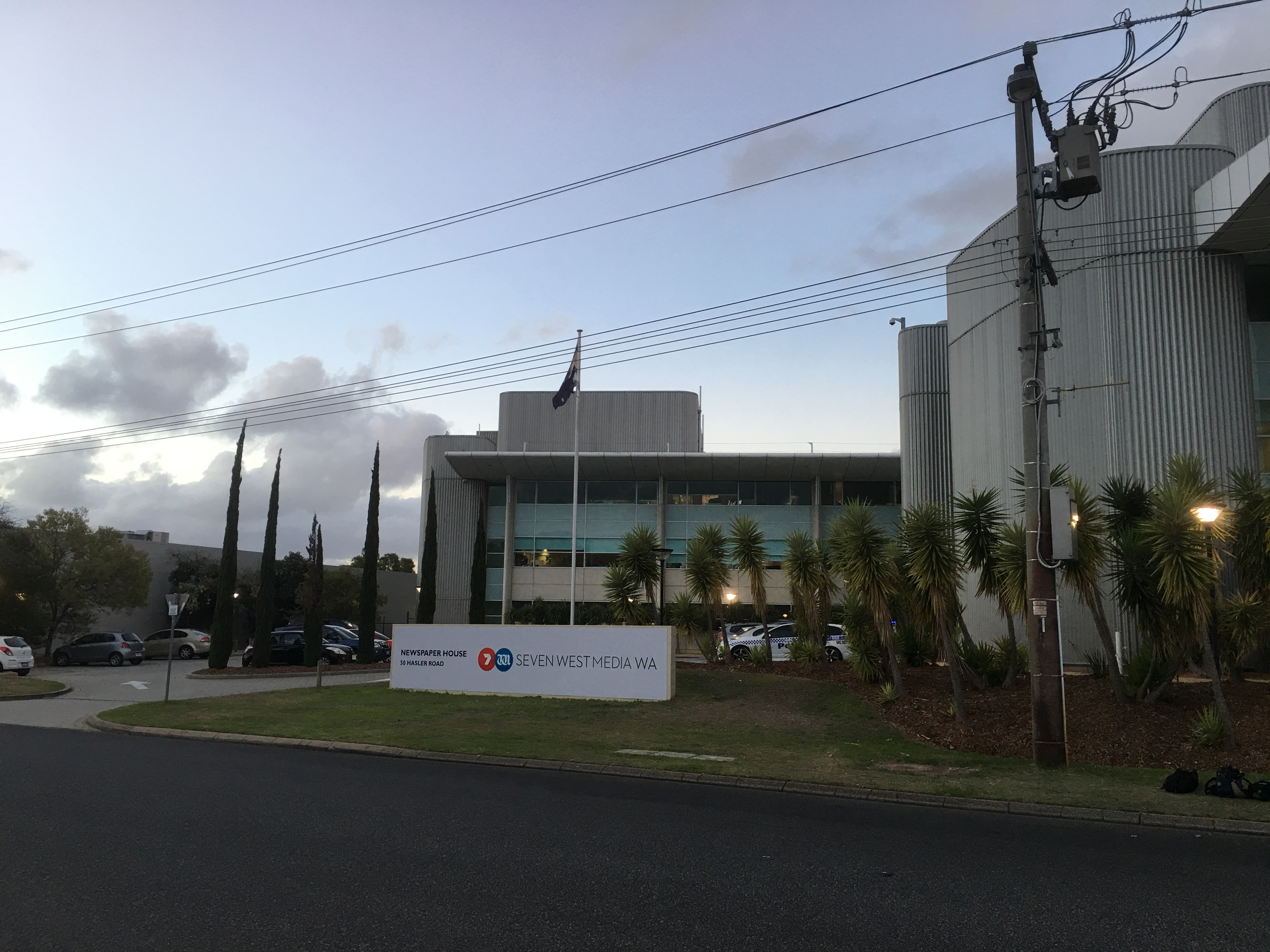
- Headquarters in Osborne Park
- Formerly: West Australian Newspapers Holdings Limited (1992–2011)
- Type: Public
- Traded as: ASX: SWM
- Industry: Media
- Predecessor: Seven Media Group
- Founded: 1992; 34 years ago
- Headquarters: 50 Hasler Road, Osborne Park, Western Australia, Australia
- Key people: Kerry Stokes (Chairman); Jeff Howard (CEO)
- Products: Television; Radio; Newspapers; Magazines; Websites
- Revenue: $1.4 billion (2024/25)
- Operating income: $159 million (2024/25)
- Net income: $57 million (2024/25)
- Number of employees: 5,000+
- Parent: Seven Media Group
- Website: sevenmediagroup.com.au

Seven West Media Limited is an Australian diversified media business, with an extensive presence in broadcast television, radio, print and online publishing.

Seven West Media owns the Seven Network, Australia's second-largest commercial television network (by audience and advertising market share). It also owns The West Australian, The Sunday Times and the Community Newspaper Group.

Seven Group Holdings Ltd (SGH), a company controlled by Australian Capital Equity, was Seven West Media's largest shareholder, with over $1 billion in Seven West Media shares and $250 million of Seven West Media convertible preference shares (CPS).

In September 2025, Seven West Media and Southern Cross Media Group announced their intention to merge. The merger was completed on 7 January 2026, and the company therefore became a subsidiary of Seven Media Group.

== History ==
First Seven West logo (2011–2012)

Former Seven West logo (2012–2020)

=== The West Australian ===
The West Australian newspaper was owned by the publicly listed company West Australian Newspapers Limited (WAN) from the 1920s. In 1969, the Melbourne based Herald & Weekly Times (HWT) bought WAN and published the paper until 1987, when News Limited acquired HWT. News Limited sold WAN to Bell Group in 1987 The following year Bond Corporation, gained control of Bell Group and hence the paper. This ownership structure survived only for a few years until the collapse of Bond Corporation. A newly formed company, West Australian Newspapers Holdings, then purchased the newspaper from the receivers before being floated in an oversubscribed $185 million public offering.

In January 2005, WAN in a 50/50 joint venture with Publishing & Broadcasting Limited purchased Hoyts from Consolidated Press Holdings. In September 2007, WAN sold its stake in Hoyts to Pacific Equity Partners.

Kerry Stokes acquired 14.9% through the Seven Network and became chairman of West Australian Newspapers in 2009. Stokes appointed Chris Wharton as CEO of West Australian Newspapers and Brett McCarthy as editor.

=== Seven Media Group ===
The Seven Network (commonly known as Channel 7 or simply Seven) dates back to 4 November 1956, when the first stations on the VHF7 frequency were established in Melbourne and Sydney. The Seven Network is one of five main free-to-air networks in Australia.

==== Origin ====
The Seven Network began as a group of independent stations in Sydney, Melbourne, Brisbane, Adelaide and Perth. HSV-7 Melbourne, licensed to the Herald & Weekly Times (owners of two local papers at the time, The Herald and The Sun), was the first station in the country to use the VHF7 frequency. It launched on 4 November 1956, soon joined on 2 December by Amalgamated Television Services ATN-7 in Sydney.

TVW-7 Perth began broadcasting almost two years later, on 16 October 1959, as the city's first commercial station. It was licensed to TVW7, a subsidiary of West Australian Newspapers, publisher of The West Australian. BTQ-7 followed on 1 November, signing on as Brisbane's second commercial television station. In 1969 the Melbourne based Herald and Weekly times group purchased WA Newspapers . The HWT group already owned HSV 7 and ADS 7 and under the media laws of the time was required to sell TVW 7. A new company was formed and floated on the Perth Stock Exchange, TVW Enterprises Pty Ltd.

ADS-7 in Adelaide launched on 24 October 1959 as the final capital city VHF7 station. TVW Enterprises purchased Adelaide's SAS 10 in 1971. In 1987 ADS 7 station swapped frequencies with SAS-10, with the latter becoming SAS-7.

==== 1980s ownership changes ====
The Bell Group, completed a takeover on TVW Enterprises in 1982. The Herald & Weekly Times, owner of HSV-7 and ADS-7, was sold to News Limited in December 1986 who sold off HSV to John Fairfax & Sons soon afterwards, for $320 million, while ADS 7 was sold to Frank Lowy's Northern Star (owners of the 10 Network stations in Sydney and Melbourne). Fairfax went on to axe a number of locally produced shows in favour of networked content from its Sydney counterpart, ATN-7 (also owned by Fairfax at the time).

In 1987, Fairfax sold its stations to Qintex. Qintex had previously bought, and subsequently sold off, stations in Brisbane and regional Queensland before taking control of the network. The next year, another new logo was introduced along with evening soap opera Home & Away and a relaunched Seven National News, now known as Seven News. The network expanded in 1988 when Skase bought out Bell Group's two stations for $130 million creating the first owned and operated national network of the five mainland city Channel 7 stations.

A failed $1.5 billion bid for MGM Studios in the same year sent Qintex into receivership. Christopher Skase fled Australia in 1990 in order to escape extradition. The business' assets were bundled together by receivers and made into a new company, Seven Network Limited, in 1991.

==== Advent of Kerry Stokes ====
The network was re-listed as a public company on the Australian Securities Exchange in 1993. In 1995, Stokes acquired 19.9% of the public company and was elected chairman. He asked Alan Jackson to be its CEO for a number of years in the late 1990s. Shortly after it acquired Sunshine Television, a Seven Network affiliate in regional Queensland, Sunshine Television's regional stations effectively became a part of the Seven Network, identical in appearance and programming to the rest of the business' stations. Seven Queensland won the annual audience ratings for the first time in 1998.

The year 2000 saw Seven as the host broadcaster for the Sydney Olympics. The network adopted a new logo. In 2003, Stokes appointed David Leckie as CEO of Seven and Peter Meakin as Head of News and Current Affairs. In January 2006, the Seven Network, Pacific Magazine and online portal Yahoo Australia and New Zealand combined in a joint venture to form Yahoo!7, representing all three companies' online assets. This venture is now Australia's most popular internet portal and the joint venture is driving a range of online and IPTV businesses. Seven is building and acquiring a range of broadband businesses, including wireless broadband group Unwired, VOIP operator Engin and has become the Australian licensee for TiVo, due to be launched in 2008. The group has also established a strategic 20 per cent shareholding in West Australian Newspapers.

Since 2007, the Seven Network has been the highest rating television network in Australia, ahead of the Nine Network, Network 10, ABC and SBS. In 2011, the Seven Network won all 40 out of 40 weeks of the ratings season for total viewers. Seven is the first to do this since the introduction of the OZtam ratings system in 2001. As of 2014 it was the second largest network in the country in terms of population reach.

68% owned by Kerry Stokes (as of 2014), Seven Network is a network of commercial free-to-air television stations in Sydney, Melbourne, Brisbane and Adelaide, as well as regional Queensland and Perth. The platform, as well as a 33 per cent stake in Sky News Australia, now reaches 98 per cent of Australians. Seven has also established a major magazine publishing business, Pacific Magazines which, as of 2014, accounted for more than 20 per cent of magazines sold in Australia.

In 2006, Seven Network and KKR created a new joint venture, Seven Media Group, a multi-faceted media company combining a presence in broadcast television, magazine and online applications.

7HD was officially announced on 15 September 2007, with the Seven Media Group announcing its intention to start a high definition multichannel. By the end of 2007, the Seven Network had become the most watched network in the country, dominating morning and prime time slots.

=== Seven West Media ===
On 21 February 2011, Seven Media Group announced its intention to merge with West Australian Newspapers Holdings Limited (WAN). WAN purchased Seven Media Group from Seven Group Holdings and partner U.S. private equity firm KKR, and announced the new company would be known as "Seven West Media". On 11 April 2011, the acquisition was approved by WAN shareholders. On 21 May 2013, KKR sold its remaining 12% stake in Seven West Media.

In May 2020, Seven West Media sold Pacific Magazines to Bauer Media Group, including leading lifestyle brands Marie Claire, Women's Health, Who, New Idea and Home Beautiful.

In February 2021, both Google and Facebook in Australia made deals with Seven West Media for the latter to provide news coverage. These agreements came after the government planned to implement a law "that would force tech companies to pay news outlets for content" to ensure that digital platforms would provide a "contribution to the sustainability of the Australian news industry".

On 18 August 2022, Seven West Media announced it will take equity in View Media Group via its Seven West Ventures subsidiary.

In June 2024, Seven West Media announced it would cut up to 150 jobs and restructure into three divisions: Television, Digital and Western Australia.

In May 2025, Seven West Media announced its intention to purchase Southern Cross Austereo's regional Seven Network affiliate stations in Tasmania, Darwin, Spencer Gulf, Broken Hill, Mount Isa and Remote Central and Eastern Australia for $3.75 million. The sale was completed on 1 July 2025.

Following Seven West Media's acquisition of Southern Cross Austereo's television assets, Seven and Southern Cross Media Group (owners of SCA) announced in September 2025 their intention to merge. Seven West Media was suspended from the Australian Securities Exchange (ASX) on 24 December 2025, with the merger completed on 7 January 2026 and Seven was delisted from the ASX.

== Key people ==
The Chairman of Seven West Media is Kerry Stokes, who is also chairman of Seven Group Holdings. He is retired as Chairman of Seven West in January 2026 after the Southern Cross merger is completed.

On 26 June 2012, Seven West Media announced former Nine Network executive David Leckie's transition from chief executive officer of Seven West Media to a new role as executive director, media for Seven Group Holdings.

Don Voelte, the former managing director and CEO of Woodside Energy and a director of Seven West Media, was appointed CEO and managing director of Seven West Media. He subsequently stepped down to become managing director and chief executive officer of Seven Group Holdings and was replaced by Tim Worner who became the CEO.

== Assets ==
=== Television ===
- Seven Network (national free-to-air television network)
  - Metropolitan stations:
    - ATN Sydney
    - HSV Melbourne
    - BTQ Brisbane
    - SAS Adelaide
    - TVW Perth
    - TNT Tasmania
    - TND Darwin
  - Regional stations:
    - STQ Regional Queensland
    - GWN Regional WA
    - CBN Southern NSW/ACT
    - NEN Northern NSW/Gold Coast
    - AMV/PTV Regional Victoria/Mildura
    - GTS/BKN Spencer Gulf/Broken Hill
    - QQQ/ITQ Remote Central & Eastern Australia/Mount Isa
- 7HD is an Australian free-to-air HD digital television multichannel using the primary channel simulcast.
- 7two is an Australian free-to-air digital television multichannel suitable for people 55+
- 7mate is an Australian free-to-air digital television multichannel aimed at men 16 to 54-year-olds.
- 7Bravo is an Australian free-to-air digital television multichannel featuring reality and true crime programs.
- 7flix is an Australian free-to-air digital television multichannel featuring kids, family programs and movies.
- Racing.com is an Australian free-to-air standard definition digital television channel co-owned and co-operated with Racing Victoria.
- 7plus is a video on demand, catch-up TV service which carries the main and multichannels of the Seven Network.

=== Radio and Digital Audio ===
- Triple M radio network (metro, regional and digital stations across Australia)
- Hit Network radio network (metro and regional contemporary music stations)
- LiSTNR digital audio platform, including streaming radio, podcasts and digital music channels

=== Publishing and News Media ===
- The West Australian
- The Nightly
- The Sunday Times
- Community Newspaper Group
- 23 regional newspapers and magazines
- the Streetsmart and Travellers Atlas street directories
- the quarterly Vita and Habitat & Lifestyle magazines

=== Other Businesses ===
- bloo Western Australian business search and website advertising project
- Community Newspaper Group
- 67% of Hybrid Television Services exclusive licensee of TiVo in Australia and New Zealand from 2008.
- Wjobs
- 4 business directories across the State
- Two commercial printing plants
