= Tim Worner =

Australian business executive

Tim Worner is an Australian business executive from Perth. He was the chief executive officer of Seven West Media from December 2011 until August 2019. He was previously the CEO of the Seven Network. He succeeded his longtime mentor David Leckie for that role in December 2011.
