= Coates Hire =

Australian equipment rental company

Coates
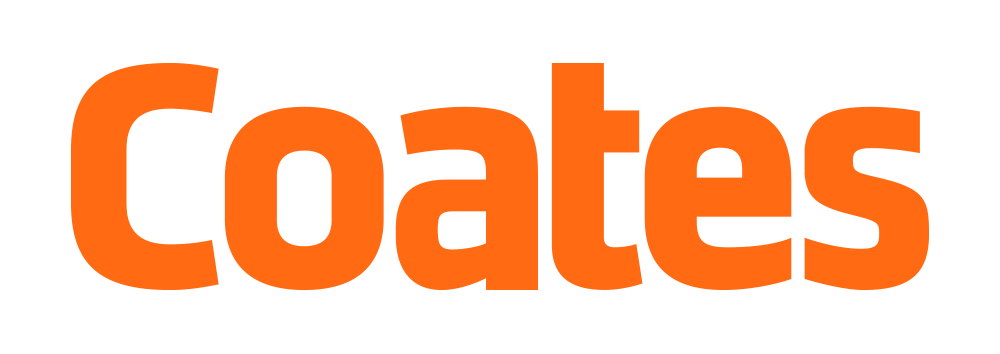
- Type: Subsidiary
- Industry: Equipment rental
- Founded: 1885; 141 years ago
- Headquarters: Mascot, New South Wales, Australia
- Number of locations: 145 branches
- Area served: Australia; Southeast Asia
- Key people: Ryan Stokes (chairman); Murray Vitlich (CEO)
- Products: Power tools, Shoring, Portable and modular buildings, Portaloos, Traffic & Pedestrian barriers, Generators
- Revenue: A$1,143 million (2023)
- Net income: A$183.6 million (2019)
- Total assets: A$2.1 billion (2019)
- Number of employees: 2,200 +
- Parent: Seven Group Holdings
- Website: www.coates.com.au

Coates (formerly known as Coates Hire) is an Australian equipment rental company operating in all Australian states and territories. It is a fully owned subsidiary of Seven Group Holdings. As of 2023, Coates is valued at A$1.87 billion of hire equipment at original cost.

== History ==
Coates was founded in 1885 as a small engineering company in Melbourne. It diversified into equipment hire in the years following World War II when a vibratory roller was purchased and lent to potential customers on a Try Before You Buy policy. Coates was listed on the Australian Securities Exchange (ASX) in 1955. In 1972 Coates was purchased by Australian National Industries.

In 1993, it commenced operations in Indonesia. In August 1996 it was re-listed on the ASX. In 2002, Wreckair was acquired from Brambles Limited.

In January 2008, it was delisted from the ASX when acquired by private investors The Carlyle Group and the National Hire Group. The hire businesses of Coates and the National Hire Group were merged to consolidate the two largest hire companies in Australia.

On 25 October 2017, Seven Group Holdings acquired the remaining 53% from The Carlyle Group as well as from minority owners. Seven Group Holdings had first invested in Coates, alongside The Carlyle Group and management in 2008 through its WesTrac subsidiary.

On 10 June 2021, the company rebranded from Coates Hire to Coates.

== Sponsorships ==
Coates has been a regular sponsor of Supercars teams and events. It was title sponsor for Nick Percat’s 2012 Development Series, 2013 Australian Carrera Cup Championship and 2014 V8 Supercars Championship campaigns. It was previously the title sponsor for various Supercars events including the Ipswich SuperSprint, Sydney 500, Supercars Challenge, Melbourne 400 and the Newcastle 500.
