= Community Newspaper Group =

Newspaper company in Perth, Western Australia

The Community Newspaper Group was a community newspaper business in Perth, Western Australia. Owned by Seven Media Group, it published 23 community newspapers within the metropolitan region of Perth, from Yanchep and Two Rocks in the city's north to Mandurah in the south.

== History ==
The Community Newspaper Group was established in 1985. In May 2019, Seven West Media bought out joint venture partner News Corp Australia giving it 100% ownership with its headquarters moving from Northbridge to Osborne Park.

In August 2021 Seven West Media ceased publishing most of its Community Newspaper Group-branded newspapers and replaced them with 10 localised editions under the PerthNow brand.

== Publications ==
The Community Newspaper Group's papers included:

=== City and western suburbs ===
- Eastern Reporter
- Guardian Express
- Stirling Times
- Western Suburbs Weekly

=== Hills and eastern suburbs ===
- Avon Valley Gazette
- Comment News
- Hills Gazette
- Kalamunda Reporter
- Midland Reporter
- The Advocate

=== Northern suburbs ===
- Joondalup Times
- North Coast Times
- Wanneroo Times
- Weekender

=== Southern suburbs ===
- Canning Times
- Cockburn Gazette
- Fremantle Gazette
- Melville Times
- Southern Gazette

=== South coastal suburbs ===
- Kwinana Courier
- Pinjarra Murray Times
- Weekend Courier

The Sound Telegraph and the Mandurah Coastal Times, covering Rockingham and the Peel region respectively, continue to be published under those names without the PerthNow branding.

== Digital editions ==
In 2018 the Community Newspaper Group closed a number of newspapers and shifted their publication online. These digital mastheads were made available on communitynews.com.au and included:

- Comment News
- Guardian Express
- Ellenbrook/Swan Valley Advocate
- Hills/Avon Valley Gazette
- Midland/Kalamunda Reporter
- North Coast Times
- Weekend/Kwinana Courier

In April 2020, Community Newspaper Group transferred all its newspaper websites to the PerthNow website.
