= Matraville Refinery =

Former oil refinery in New South Wales, Australia

- Location within New South Wales
- Location: Sydney, New South Wales, Australia; 33.971°S 151.233°E

Refinery details
- Owners: Boral; Total
- Opened: 1947
- Closed: 1984

Matraville Refinery was an oil refinery in the Australian state of New South Wales.

Bitumen and Oil Refineries (Australia) Limited (later named by the acronym Boral) commenced construction of Australia's first bitumen and oil refinery in Matraville in March 1947. The company was 40% owned by Caltex which supplied the crude oil to be refined. Most of the early employees were discharged from the Royal Australian Navy. In 1968 Boral sold a 50% stake to Total, before selling it the remainder in January 1972. In 1979, the plant was expanded.

It closed in 1984 and was demolished in 1988.
