= WesTrac =

Company based in Perth, Western Australia

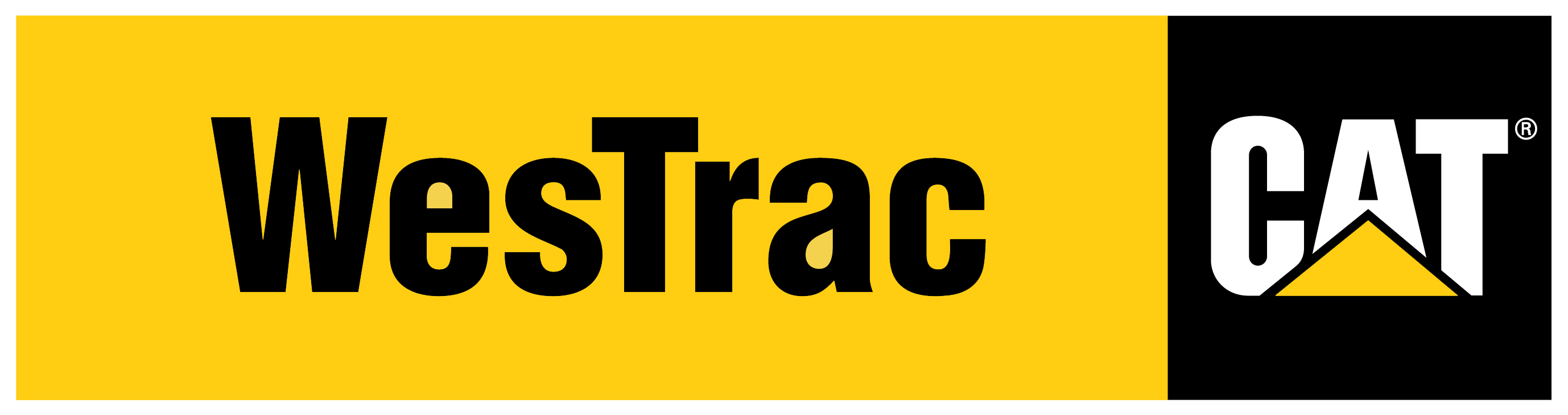
- Industry: Heavy Equipment, Construction, Mining, Building
- Founded: 1990
- Headquarters: South Guildford, Western Australia
- Number of locations: 31
- Area served: Western Australia; New South Wales; Australian Capital Territory
- Key people: Jarvas Croome (CEO - WA); Adrian Howard (Chief Executive - NSW/ACT)
- Products: Caterpillar Equipment Dealer
- Revenue: $2.452 billion (FY2018) - 11% Increase YOY
- Owner: Seven Group Holdings
- Number of employees: 3,500
- Website: www.westrac.com.au

WesTrac is a Caterpillar dealer. It was owned by Australian Capital Equity, which in turn was owned by Kerry Stokes. In 2010 it and Seven Network Limited merged to form Seven Group Holdings.

== Headquarters ==
WesTrac is based in South Guildford, Western Australia, and is the Caterpillar dealer for Western Australia, New South Wales, Australian Capital Territory. Until 1989, the Caterpillar dealership in Western Australia was known as Wigmores, which was also bought by Australian Capital Equity in 1988 and renamed as WesTrac.

A new New South Wales Operational Headquarters in Tomago was opened in 2012.

== Business ==
It supplies Caterpillar mining trucks to BHP, Rio Tinto and other numerous mining companies, as well as Caterpillar engines for power generation and marine transport.

== History ==
Caterpillar began operating in Western Australia in 1925 with a dealership being opened at the South Guildford premises in 1950. Known as Wigmores the dealership was renamed as Morgans in 1989 and then WesTrac in 1990.

The company had over 3,000 employees in 2009 and was the biggest employer of apprentices outside of government.

Since 2000, WesTrac has opened dealerships across China, and is one of the largest suppliers of Caterpillar products in the world.

In 2006, WesTrac closed its agricultural dealerships in Australia, resulting from a decision by Caterpillar to cease production of agricultural equipment. Customers of Westrac were concerned that their warranties would not be honoured.

On 22 February 2010, it was announced that WesTrac would merge with Seven West Media to form Seven Network Limited, which is 70% owned by Kerry Stokes.

On 30 August 2012, WesTrac officially opened its $170m branch at Tomago (NSW), which is known as the Newcastle branch. This branch is the headquarters for WesTrac NSW.

In mid-2018, WesTrac opened a new 24,000sqm branch at the Crossroads Logistics Centre located in Casula, Sydney (NSW). This branch services Sydney customers and replaced their old branch at Holroyd. The Casula branch began operations on 16 July 2018. It has a 1,500sqm warehouse with a cutting-edge automated inventory system and a drive-through bay for easy parts pick-up.
