= BGC (company) =

Western Australian company

- Type: Private
- Industry: Construction
- Founded: 1960
- Founder: Len Buckeridge
- Headquarters: Perth
- Area served: Western Australia
- Products: Bricks; Concrete; Roofing; Windows
- Operating income: $163 million
- Subsidiaries: Midland Brick
- Website: www.bgc.com.au

BGC is a private corporate group of construction and building-related companies operating primarily in Western Australia.

BGC is one of the largest privately owned companies in Australia. It was founded by Len Buckeridge. After Buckerridge's death in 2014, family quarrels over his estate erupted into 22 separate legal actions.

== Group structure ==
BGC consists of the following companies:

- BGC Asphalt
- BGC Blokpave
- BGC Blokstone
- BGC Builders Supplies
- BGC Cement
- BGC Cemtech
- BGC Clay
- BGC Commercial Windows
- BGC Concrete
- BGC Construction
- BGC Contracting
- BGC Fibre Cement
- BGC Insulation
- BGC Plasterboard
- BGC Plumbing
- BGC Quarries
- BGC Transport
- Brikmakers
- Affinity Windows
- Automated Surveys
- Harmony Roof Tiles
- Midland Brick

BGC companies are the third largest home builders in Australia, through their subsidiary companies including Commodore Homes, Smart Homes for Living, Aussie Living Homes, Go Homes, Now Living, Terrace, HomeStart, and Ventura South West.
