= Unwired =

Australian telecommunications company

Unwired Australia Pty Ltd
- Unwired modem and logo
- Company type: Subsidiary
- Founded: 11 August 2000
- Headquarters: Sydney, New South Wales, Australia
- Key people: Ryan Stokes, Chairman; Martin Mercer, CEO
- Products: Wireless broadband
- Number of employees: 97
- Parent: Optus
- Website: unwired.com.au

Unwired Australia Pty Ltd was an Australian company dedicated to fixed wireless telecommunications network offering carrier grade Internet services. They provided coverage in Melbourne and Sydney. As of 8 March 2010 Unwired had 52,320 customers and 97 employees. The technology used by Unwired was provided by American manufacturer Navini Networks and Venturi Wireless Solutions.

Unwired utilised a wireless network similar to WiMax, using base towers that broadcast a microwave signal, offering speeds of up to 1024 kbit/s. The Unwired network was the first data only network providing Internet services in Australia.

Unwired customers used external modems to connect to the wireless network. Unwired technology was portable, but not mobile - the technology does not operate well while the receiver was in motion. The network operated at 3.5 GHz within a spectrum exclusively reserved for use by Unwired. Unwired offered free technical support 7 days a week plus public holidays.

Optus bought out Unwired and shut down the Unwired network at midnight on 28 February 2013.

== Corporate acquisitions ==
The Seven Network Limited's subsidiary Network Holdings acquired Unwired in 2008 for a reported $127 million. Seven Network Limited owns 50% of the Seven Media Group which owns the Seven Network. At this time Unwired CEO David Spence left the company. Unwired was later consolidated into Seven's wireless broadband division, Vividwireless which was based in Perth.

Australia's second largest telecommunications company, Optus, announced in February 2012 that it would buy Vividwireless from its parent Seven Group, for a total cost of $230 million. Optus said this would create a new 4G mobile broadband network in Australia.

== Closure ==
Optus shut down the Unwired network at midnight on 28 February 2013 so that the spectrum can be used for its 4G network. Subscribers had to migrate to another internet service provider. Prepaid subscribers were given a refunds on remaining credit and pro-rated refunds on unused data.

== See also ==
- iBurst
- Austar/Unwired Alliance
- Venturi Transport Protocol
- Exetel
