= Peter Meakin =

Australian journalist (born 1942)

- Born: Peter James Meakin; 12 October 1942 (age 84); Castleford, West Yorkshire, England, United Kingdom
- Occupations: TV network News/Current Affairs Director, journalist
- Known for: Association with TV networks: Nine Network, Seven Network, Ten Network

Peter Jeremy Meakin (born 12 October 1942) is an English Australian journalist who has worked as news/current affairs director for all three of Australia's commercial television networks (Nine Network, Seven Network and Network Ten).

== Early life ==
Meakin was born in Castleford, West Yorkshire, England in 1942. His family emigrated to Australia where he attended St Peter's College, Adelaide.

== Career ==
Meakin joined the Nine Network in 1973, where he worked for thirty years, eventually becoming director of current affairs in 1987 and the head of news and current affairs in 1993; he was credited with the ratings success of programs including Sunday, 60 Minutes and A Current Affair. He was awarded a Walkley Award for leadership in journalism in 2002.

In April 2003, Meakin left the Nine Network acrimoniously to join the rival Seven Network, where former Nine managing director David Leckie had taken on the reins. There, he was instrumental in lifting Seven's news ratings on the east coast, and by 2007, Seven News had become the top-rating news service in each of the five major capital cities in Australia.

In November 2012, Meakin resigned as director of news and current affairs of the Seven Network after nine years in the position with Rob Raschke named as his successor. Meakin remained with the network in an advisory role for some time.

In February 2014, Meakin was poached by Network Ten to become their executive director of News and Current Affairs. He held the position until 2016, when he became news executive consultant, advising on the News at 5pm and The Project. As per February 2018 he was back in charge of Network Ten news and current affairs.

== Controversy ==
Meakin's decision to expose the secret gay life of a New South Wales government minister, David Campbell, on the Seven Network raised the ire of the general public with controversial reasons to "out him" in the public interest.

=== Drink driving ===
Meakin was subject to considerable media criticism following three serious drink driving offences committed in 2006 and 2007, resulting in a licence suspension of eight years. Although he lost a District Court appeal against his third conviction for dangerous driving, he had his original sentence, 14 months of weekend detention, reduced to 250 hours of community service.
