= Midland Brick =

Brick manufacturing company in Western Australia

- Industry: Building and construction materials
- Founded: 1946
- Founder: Charles and Gerald New
- Headquarters: Middle Swan, Western Australia
- Area served: Australia, New Zealand and Asia
- Products: Building products: bricks, concrete blocks, pavers, retaining walls, roof tiles and stone cladding
- Parent: BGC
- Website: www.midlandbrick.com.au

Midland Brick supplies building and construction materials including bricks, concrete blocks, pavers, retaining walls, roof tiles and stone cladding. Products are supplied to customers in Australia, New Zealand and Asia. Midland Brick headquarters are located in Middle Swan, Western Australia.

== History ==
In 1946 Charles and Gerry New set up a brickyard in Middle Swan with £200 borrowed from their mother, to address the severe shortage of building supplies—especially bricks—after World War II.

Charles collected clay from the Darling Range and experimented making bricks in his oven at home. Subsequently, in 1947, using second hand bricks, the brothers built their first square updraft kiln and, using war-surplus materials and equipment, made their own machinery.

In 1949 Charles established Western Australia's first brick laying school and, in that year, and throughout the 1950s Midland Brick constructed more kilns and created new types of bricks. In 1953 the brothers established Midland Brick Co Pty Ltd. Ten years later, following a trip to the United States, they began to plan and build a new and more efficient tunnel kiln.

In 1972 Midland Brick developed and introduced the first commercial pavers into Western Australia. The first of these were used in the construction of the Perth Concert Hall and are still in place today. The firm was said to have promoted the Perth tradition of building double-brick homes. By the end of the 1970s Midland was making 83 types of bricks. Around this time production costs were significantly reduced due to mechanisation and innovation, and fuel costs were specifically reduced by the use of natural gas, delivered by the new Dongara to Perth gas pipeline.

In 1985 Midland Brick acquired Whitemans Brick. The nine kilns that came with the acquisition made the firm the world's largest brick producer on one site, which was recognised in the 1996 edition of the Guinness Book of Records. By 1989 Midland Brick employed 850 people, had sales of $100 million annually and produced nearly a million bricks a day, supplying about 80 per cent of the Western Australian market and exporting a proportion.

After Charles died in 1989, Gerry sold Midland Brick to Boral in 1990. By the late 1990s Midland Brick was the world's largest exporter of clay bricks and pavers to Japan and South Korea and one of the world's biggest brick and paver exporters overall. In 2006 the firm commissioned Kiln 11, a high-tech robotic kiln which can produce up to 50 million bricks each year. The kiln is more environmentally friendly, using less gas with fewer emissions and less waste and able to produce a greater range of bricks. In the same year the company had to deal with issues relating to pollution.

In August 2019, Boral agreed terms to sell Midland Brick to BGC. On 1 September 2021, the Brikmakers brand was retired after operations were integrated into the single Midland Brick brand.
