= SGH Limited =

Australian company

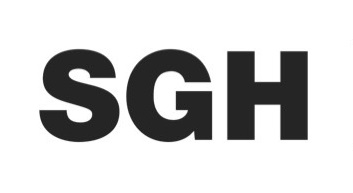
- Type: Public
- Traded as: ASX: SGH; S&P/ASX 100 component
- Industry: Media, Mining, Construction, Equipment rental
- Predecessor: Qintex; Seven Network Limited
- Founded: 12 February 2010; 16 years ago
- Founder: Kerry Stokes (executive chairman)
- Headquarters: 175 Liverpool Street, Sydney, Australia
- Area served: Worldwide
- Key people: Ryan Stokes (CEO); Warwick Smith (director)
- Owner: Australian Capital Equity (50.93%)
- Subsidiaries: Boral; Coates Hire; Allight; WesTrac; Seven Media Group (20.06%); Beach Energy (29%)
- Website: sghl.com.au

SGH Limited (formerly Seven Group Holdings Limited) is an Australian diversified operating company, with businesses across industrial services, energy, and media.

== History ==
Seven Network Limited was created in 1991 by receivers in order to bundle together the assets of Christopher Skase's collapsed former business, Qintex.

Between 1995 and April 2001, Alan Jackson of Nylex was the non-executive director of Seven, after being asked by Stokes to lead the company.

In 2002, Seven Media Group acquired Pacific Magazines. In January 2006, the company partnered with Yahoo! to launch Yahoo!7, a cross-media entity meant to expand the content distribution networks of both companies.

In December 2006, Seven Network Limited shareholders voted to spin off the company's 'old media' assets into a 50/50 joint venture with private equity firm KKR, creating the Seven Media Group.

In January 2008, Kerry Stokes' National Hire Group took over alongside private investors The Carlyle Group the equipment rental company Coates, de-listing it from the Australian Securities Exchange. The hire businesses of Coates and National Hire were merged to consolidate the two largest hire companies in Australia, creating Coates Hire.

On 22 February 2010, it was announced that WesTrac, owned by Australian Capital Equity, Kerry Stokes's investment firm, would merge with Seven Network Limited, and the combined entity was renamed Seven Group Holdings.

On 25 October 2017, SGH acquired the remaining 53% of Coates from The Carlyle Group, as well as from other minority owners for $517 million. SGH had first invested in Coates, alongside The Carlyle Group and exiting management in 2008 through its WesTrac subsidiary.

In April 2011, Seven Media Group was acquired by West Australian Newspapers to create Seven West Media. SGH remains Seven West Media's largest shareholder, with a 40.2% stake.

In July 2021, Seven Group Holdings took 70% ownership in construction materials company Boral. It gained full ownership of Boral in July 2024.

In November 2024, Seven Group Holdings changed its name to SGH Ltd, Its website domain to www.sghl.com.au, and its ASX ticker code to SGH.
