= Whitemans Brick =

Former brick company in Perth, Western Australia

Whitemans Brick was a brick manufacturing company in Middle Swan in Western Australia.

It was a company owned by Lou Whiteman. His son, Manton Lewis Cyril Whiteman, took over the business after his father died.

The land on which the operations were located were expanded in the 1920s. It was also notable in early usage of trucking materials due to shortage of railway facilities.

It was notable due to its large kilns.

It was taken over by Midland Brick in 1985.
