= South African Class NG15 2-8-2 =

1931 narrow-gauge steam locomotive

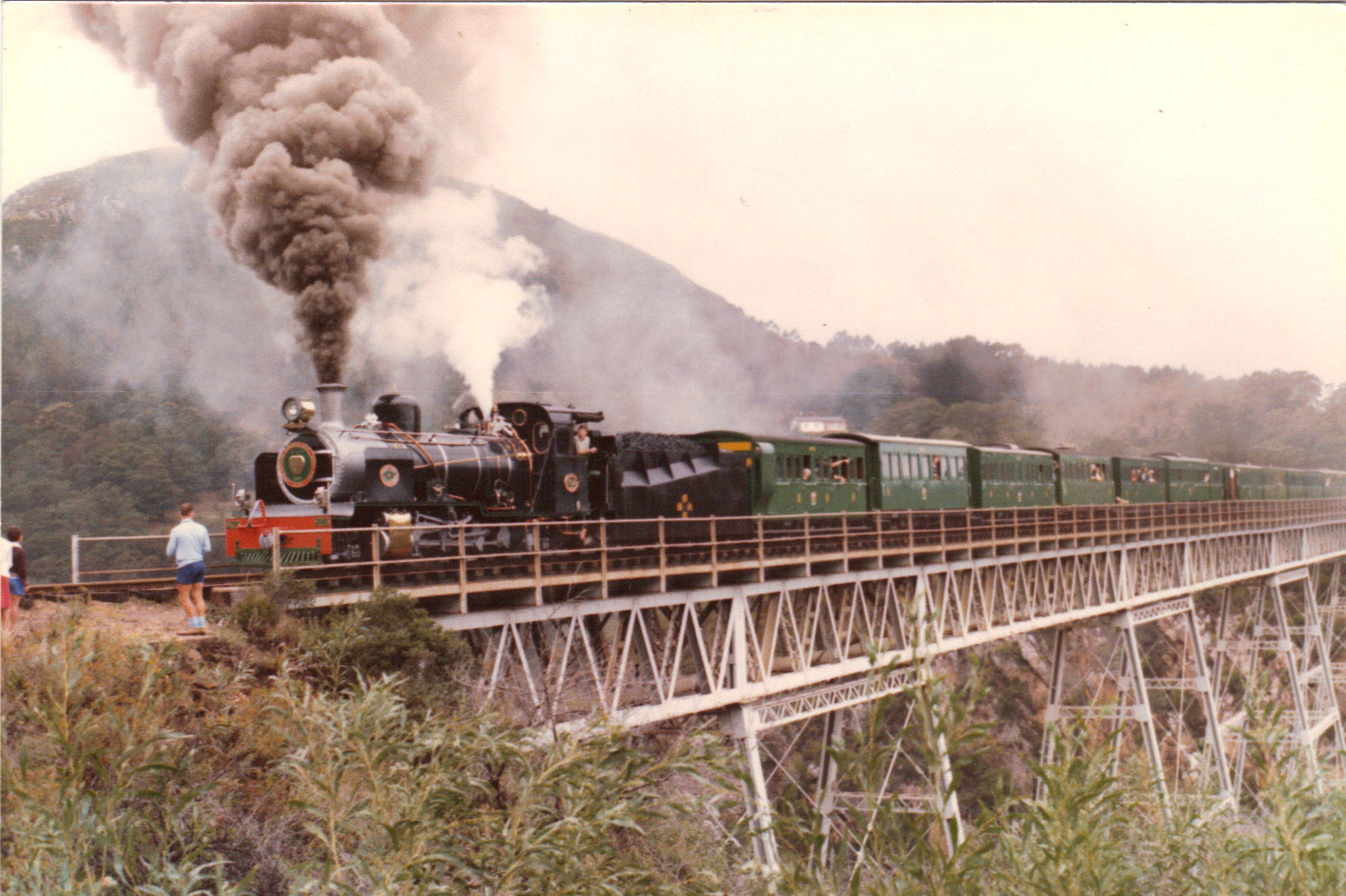
- No. NG124 on Van Stadens bridge, 26 October 1985
Type and origin
- Power type: Steam
- Designer: South African Railways (Mr. Peters)
- Builder: Henschel & Son; Société Franco-Belge
- Serial number: Henschel 21905-21907, 24475-24479, 29585-29589; Franco-Belge 2667-2671, 2682-2686
- Model: Class NG15
- Build date: 1931-1957
- Total produced: 21
Specifications
- Configuration
  - Whyte: 2-8-2 (Mikado)
  - UIC: 1'D1'h2
- Driver: 3rd coupled axle
- Gauge: 2 ft (610 mm) narrow
- Leading dia.: 21 in (533 mm)
- Coupled dia.: 33 7/8 in (860 mm)
- Trailing dia.: 21 in (533 mm)
- Tender wheels: 21 in (533 mm)
- Wheelbase: 44 ft 7 1/16 in (13,591 mm)
  - Axle spacing (Asymmetrical): 1-2: 3 ft 1 7/16 in (951 mm); 2-3: 3 ft 4 1/8 in (1,019 mm); 3-4: 3 ft 1 7/16 in (951 mm)
  - Engine: 20 ft 2 15/16 in (6,171 mm)
  - Coupled: 9 ft 7 in (2,921 mm)
  - Tender: 15 ft (4,572 mm)
  - Tender bogie: 4 ft (1,219 mm)
- Length
  - Over couplers: 54 ft 3 3/16 in (16,540 mm)
- Height: 10 ft 5 in (3,175 mm)
- Frame type: Plate
- Axle load: 6 LT 15 cwt 1 qtr (6,871 kg)
  - Leading: 4 LT 7 cwt 3 qtr (4,458 kg)
  - 1st coupled: 6 LT 9 cwt 1 qtr (6,566 kg)
  - 2nd coupled: 6 LT 9 cwt 1 qtr (6,566 kg)
  - 3rd coupled: 6 LT 15 cwt (6,858 kg)
  - 4th coupled: 6 LT 15 cwt 1 qtr (6,871 kg)
  - Trailing: 5 LT 15 cwt 3 qtr (5,880 kg)
- Adhesive weight: 26 LT 8 cwt 3 qtr (26,860 kg)
- Loco weight: 36 LT 12 cwt (37,190 kg)
- Tender weight: 31 LT 4 cwt (31,700 kg)
- Total weight: 67 LT 16 cwt (68,890 kg)
- Tender type: 2-axle bogies
- Fuel type: Coal
- Fuel capacity: 5 LT 10 cwt (5.6 t)
- Water cap.: 2,860 imp gal (13,000 L)
- Firebox
  - Type: Round-top
  - Grate area: 16.7 sq ft (1.55 m^{2})
- Boiler
  - Pitch: 5 ft 8 7/8 in (1,749 mm)
  - Diameter: 3 ft 11 3/4 in (1,213 mm)
  - Tube plates: 13 ft 1 1/2 in (4,000 mm)
  - Small tubes: 94: 1 3/4 in (44 mm)
  - Large tubes: 15: 4 23/32 in (120 mm)
- Boiler pressure: 171 psi (1,179 kPa)
- Safety valve: Pop
- Heating surface
  - Firebox: 68 sq ft (6.3 m^{2})
  - Tubes: 728 sq ft (67.6 m^{2})
  - Total surface: 796 sq ft (74.0 m^{2})
- Superheater
  - Heating area: 180 sq ft (17 m^{2})
- Cylinders: Two
- Cylinder size: 15 3/4 in (400 mm) bore 17 3/4 in (451 mm) stroke
- Valve gear: Heusinger
- Valve type: Piston
- Couplers: Buffer-and-chains (SWA); Bell-and-hook (Cape)
Performance figures
- Tractive effort: 16,610 lbf (73.9 kN) @ 75%
Career
- Operators: Otavi Mining and Railway Co. Tsumeb Copper Corporation; South African Railways
- Class: Class NG15
- Number in class: 21
- Numbers: NG17-NG19, NG117-NG124, NG132-NG136, TC1-TC5 (NG144-NG148)
- Nicknames: Kalahari
- Delivered: 1931-1958
- First run: 1931

The South African Railways Class NG15 2-8-2 is a class of narrow-gauge steam locomotives.

In 1931, three narrow-gauge Class NG15 locomotives with a 2-8-2 Mikado type wheel arrangement, similar in design to the existing Class Hd and Class NG5 locomotives, were acquired by the South African Railways for the Otavi Mining and Railway Company in South West Africa. More were purchased for the Otavi Railway and the Tsumeb Copper Corporation during the subsequent years, eventually bringing the total number of these locomotives to 21 by 1958.

When the narrow-gauge Otavi Railway was regauged to Cape gauge in 1960, all 21 locomotives were taken over by the South African Railways. They were transferred to the Eastern Cape for further service on the narrow-gauge line from Port Elizabeth to Avontuur.

== Manufacturers ==
As a result of heavy traffic demands on the Otavi Railway in South West Africa (SWA), three additional locomotives were ordered in 1931. The Class NG15 2-8-2 Mikado type narrow-gauge steam locomotive was designed by the South African Railways (SAR) and built by Henschel and Son for the Otavi Mining and Railway Company. The company operated the 352-mile-long (566-kilometre) narrow-gauge Otavi Railway across the Namib Desert from Swakopmund on the Atlantic coast to Tsumeb and Grootfontein in northern SWA. The first three locomotives were delivered in 1931, numbered in the range from NG17 to NG19. They were followed by three more in 1939, numbered in the range from NG117 to NG119.

Ten more of these locomotives were built for the Otavi line by Société Franco-Belge and delivered in two batches of five in 1950 and 1953, numbered in the ranges from NG120 to NG124 and NG132 to NG136 respectively.

In 1958, five more of these locomotives, built by Henschel and numbered in the range from TC1 to TC5, were delivered to the Tsumeb Copper Corporation for use by the SAR in terms of an agreement between the SAR and the corporation. They were later renumbered in the SAR range from NG144 to NG148.

== Forerunners ==
The Class NG15 2-8-2 locomotive was a development of the Class Hd and Class NG5 locomotives which had been acquired for the Otavi Mining and Railway Company in SWA in 1912 and 1921 respectively. In the 1920s, one of the Class NG5 locomotives was sent to the Avontuur Railway in South Africa for trials, but since it jammed on the tighter curves in the Langkloof despite having one set of flangeless coupled wheels, it was returned to SWA.

The usual practice of the SAR in the steam era was to design locomotives in their own drawing offices and to then go out and find a builder. The drawing board work for the Class NG15 has been attributed to a Chief Mechanical Engineer of the Otavi Railway, a German engineer known in SWA as Mr. Peters, who was employed as a draughtsman by the SAR. Since the earlier trials with the Class NG5 locomotive, the sharpest curves on the Avontuur line had been eased and the experience gained in the process was taken into consideration during the design of the Class NG15.

== Characteristics ==
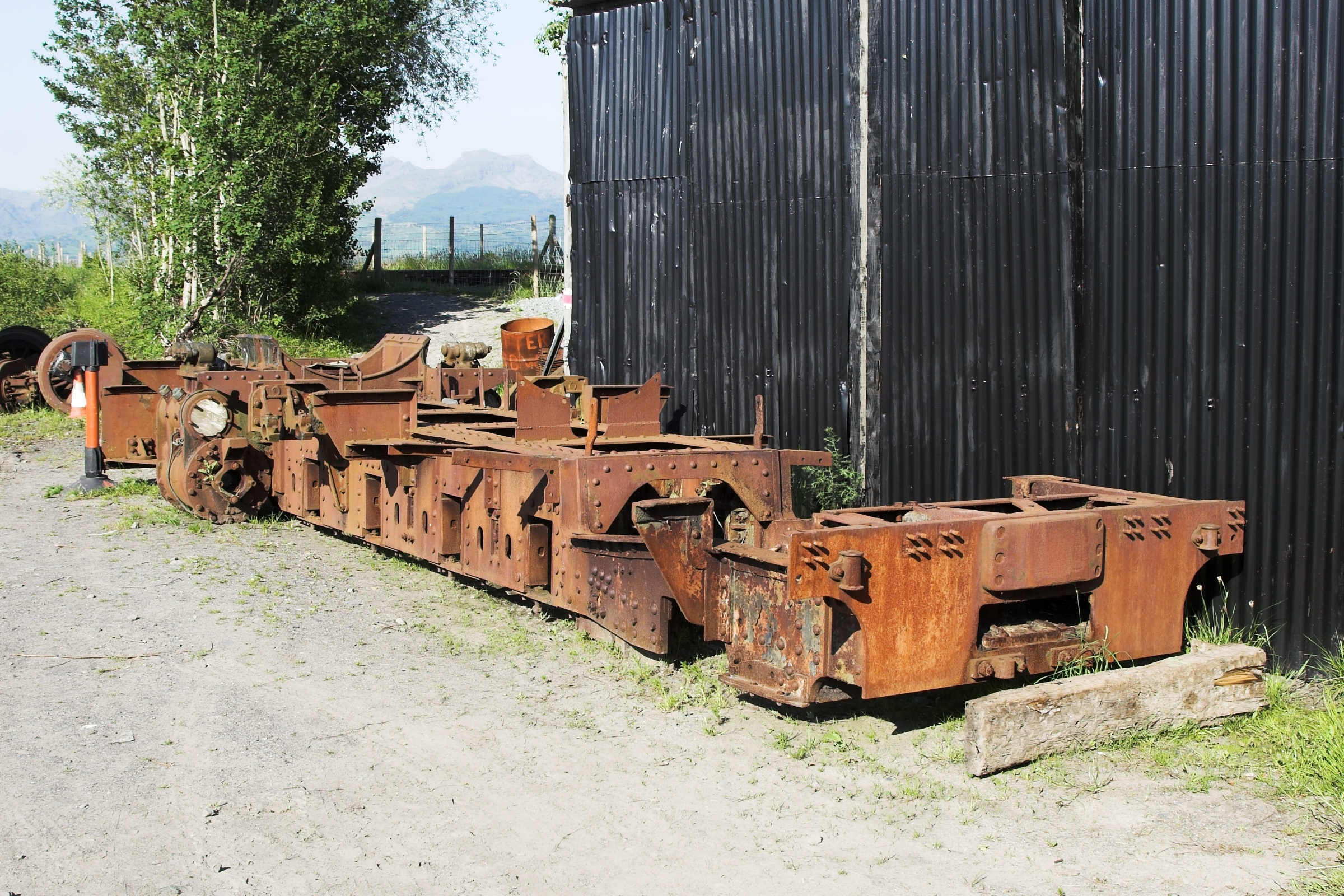
Class NG15 plate frame

Like the Class NG5, the locomotives were built on plate frames and their valves were actuated by Walschaerts valve gear, but they were fitted with piston valves instead of flat slide valves. While the sand boxes of the older locomotives were mounted on top of the boiler, aft of the dome on the Class Hd and ahead of the dome on the Class NG5, those of the Class NG15 were arranged on the running boards. The seats of the driver and stoker were mounted on poles which allowed them to be swung around to outside the cab and crews could often be seen riding outside in hot weather. Similar swing-seats were used on the SAR's narrow-gauge Garratts and on the Cape gauge Class 6 and Class 7.

Unlike the Class Hd and Class NG5 locomotives, their leading wheels were mounted in a Krauss-Helmholtz Bissel truck which was arranged in front instead of to the rear of the cylinders. The leading pair of coupled wheels of the Class NG15 had a limited amount of sideplay and were linked to the leading Bissel truck, while the axle of the leading coupled wheels still remained parallel to the other three coupled axles at all times.

This linking of a pony truck and coupled axle is known as a Krauss-Helmholtz bogie, an invention of Richard von Helmholtz who was the chief designer at the Krauss works in Munich from 1884 to 1917. On standard-gauge railways in Europe, the inclusion of a Krauss-Helmholtz bogie has allowed the use of large 2-10-0 locomotives on sharply curved mountain sections. Some early electric locomotives also used Krauss-Helmholtz bogies.

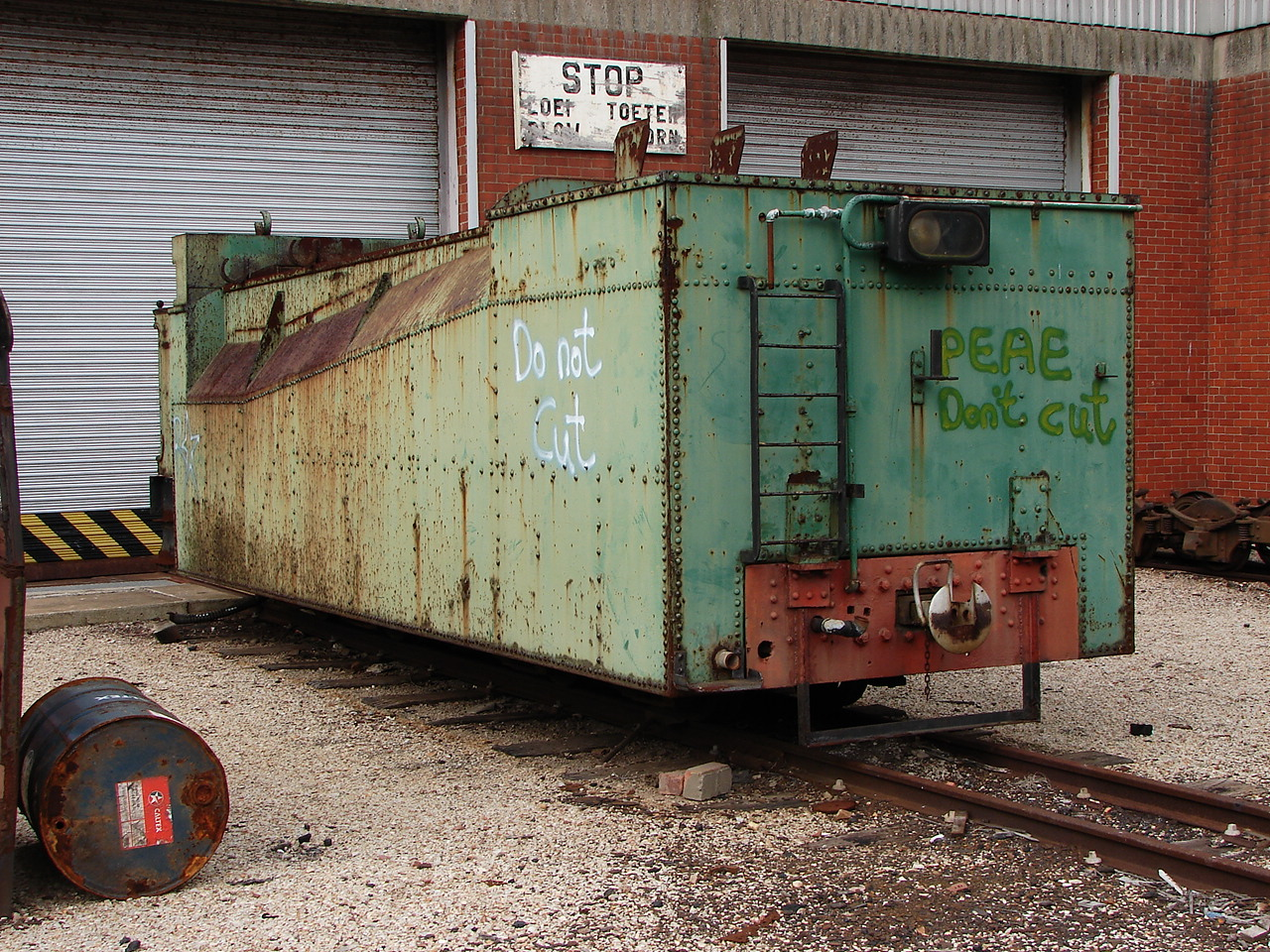
Second tender version

The Class NG15 had larger tenders than the Class NG5 with a working order weight of 31 long tons 4 hundredweight (31,700 kilograms), compared to the 25 long tons 11 hundredweight 3 quarters (26,000 kilograms) of the Class NG5's tender. The tenders had low-slung sides, with the bottom part of the water tank extending down to below axle level on either side of the tender bogies to lower the vehicle's roll centre on the narrow track gauge.

The original tenders were built as flat-sided box-shaped vehicles. A second tender version was delivered with the later batches of locomotives, with the coal bunker sides set inward for reasons unknown. The new shape made no difference to the crew's rearward field of vision and the only likely benefit was a reduced axle load as a result of the reduced coal capacity.

== Service ==
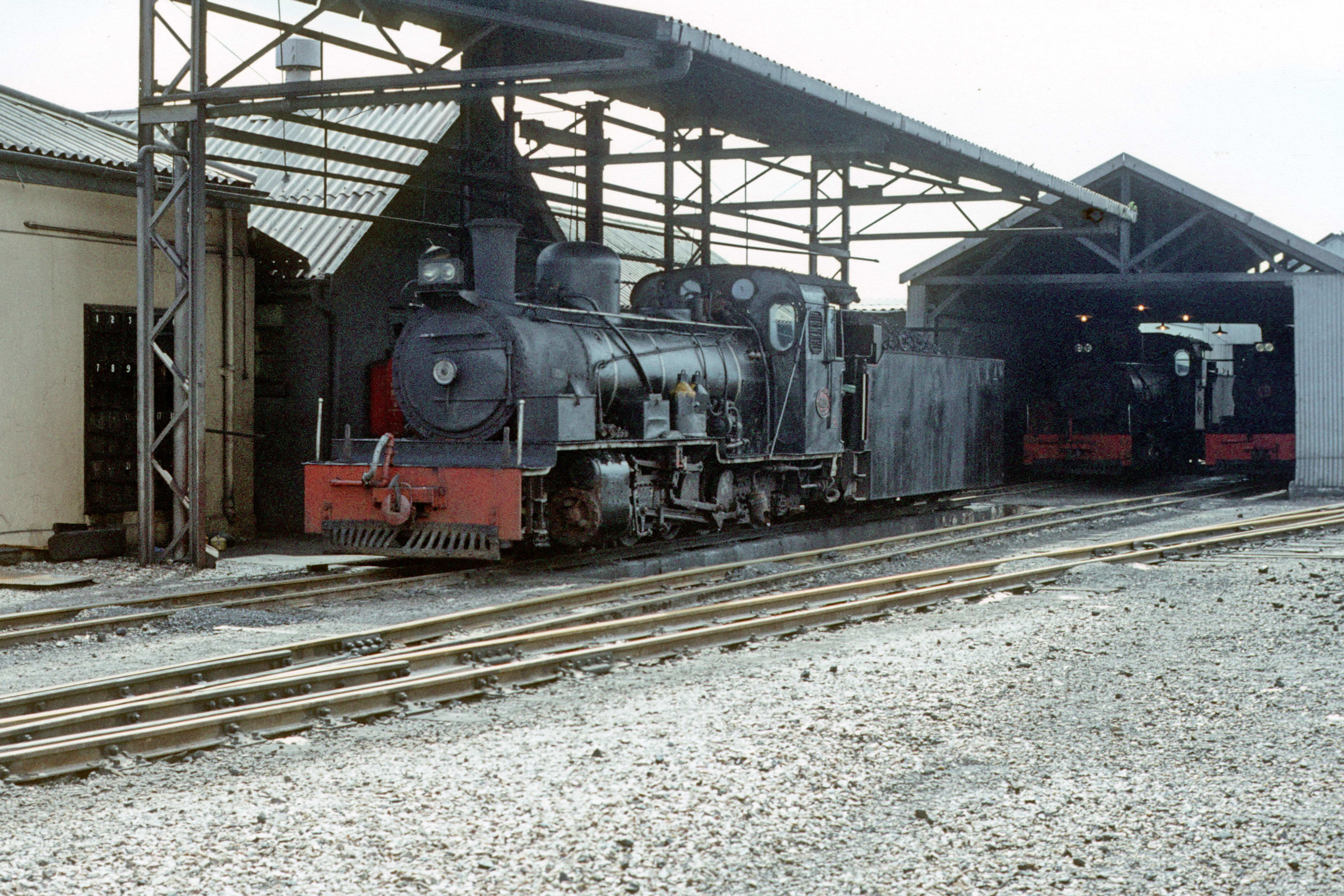
NG 15 at Humewood Road depot in Port Elizabeth (1981)

In SWA, the Class Hd, Class NG5 and Class NG15 Mikado locomotives operated in a common pool. They were the most powerful non-articulated narrow-gauge steam locomotives in SAR service.

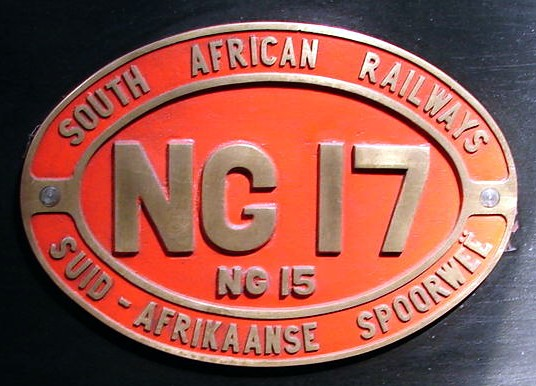
Number plate with "NG" prefix to number

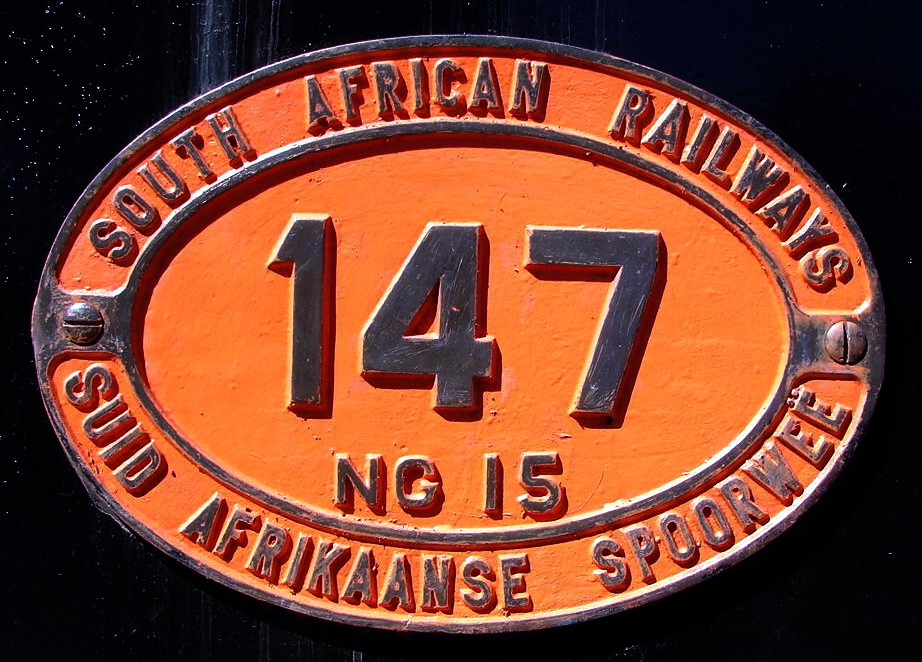
Number plate without a number prefix

In 1960, when all the SWA narrow-gauge lines were widened to Cape gauge, the Class Hd and Class NG5 locomotives were withdrawn from service while the 21 Class NG15 locomotives were all shipped to Port Elizabeth for use on the Langkloof line to Avontuur. The first one was offloaded in Port Elizabeth in April 1961, still equipped with a single central buffer and side chains, the preferred drawgear on the ex-German lines in SWA. Their arrival increased the number of locomotives on the Avontuur Railway from a total of 23 in March 1961 to 43 by July. As a result, all but one of the Class NG10 as well as Class NG G11 no. 51, South Africa's first Garratt, were withdrawn from service by July 1962.

On the Avontuur Railway, the Class NG15 was nicknamed Kalahari, inappropriately so since its previous stamping ground was across the Namib desert to the west of the Kalahari. Garratts initially continued to operate in the Langkloof since the Class NG15 was not allowed to work beyond Humansdorp from Port Elizabeth because of a lack of turning facilities, the only existing triangle at the time being the one at the end of the line at Avontuur. More turning facilities had not been required until then since the Langkloof had for years been the domain of bi-directional Garratt locomotives. During 1963–1964, turning facilities were installed at Assegaaibos, Louterwater and Misgund. From then on the use of Garratts west of Assegaaibos was confined mainly, but not entirely, to the daily transship and pick-up (T&P) workings.

Even though Garratts were still present, the Class NG15 with its spacious cab soon became the enginemen's favourites. They were free-steaming and fast and there was little difference in hauling capacity between the two types. The Class NG15s and their crews were soon doing round trips of just over 200 miles (322 kilometres) in one shift to Assegaaibos and back, unheard of in the Garratt days. In the fruit season the Kalaharis regularly logged more than 3,000 miles (4,828 kilometres) per month.

During the last years of steam traction on the Avontuur Railway, the Class NG15 was the only non-Garratt steam locomotive working in the Langkloof. Outside the apple season, the Class NG15 became well known for hauling the Apple Express from the Humewood Road railway station in Port Elizabeth to Loerie and back every Saturday to cater for tourists. It gained further fame when the Apple Express instituted an annual train race marathon, where athletes could compete against an Apple Express train filled with spectators.

Towards the end of 1986, preparations commenced to celebrate the 80th anniversary of the opening of the Apple Train line to Avontuur on 1 January 1907. Numbers NG122 and NG124 were repainted at Humewood diesel depot in red and green respectively and no. NG122 was fitted with a headboard with an apple logo. The red no. NG122 was named Starking after the red apple variety grown in the Langkloof and the green no. NG124 was named Granny Smith after the green apples that finished off each season.

In 1990, numbers NG19 and NG146 were sold to private individuals and relocated to the Alfred County Railway (ACR) at Port Shepstone in Natal. No. NG19 was stored in poor condition, amongst others without a cab and chimney, and was never used by the ACR. It is believed the owner sold it to or came to an arrangement with Sandstone Estates who collected the engine on 11 April 2003 and the tender on 18 July 2003.

No. NG146 appeared to be staged out of use until late April 1992, when it was found being repaired. It re-entered traffic on the ACR's Izotsha trains on the Harding line before the end of May 1992. After a triangle was installed at Paddock in June 1994 it was also able to work Paddock trains. The locomotive was eventually sold by its owner to the Brecon Mountain Railway in the United Kingdom and was loaded on a road rig for transport to Durban Harbour on 17 September 2001.

== End of steam ==
In 1973, steam traction in the Langkloof began to be replaced by diesel-electric power upon the introduction of the General Electric-built Class 91-000 type GE UM6B diesel-electric locomotive. Diesel and steam served the Langkloof together for some years, but by the late 1980s road transport had triumphed over rail transport on the apple route as well and the narrow-gauge steam fleet was withdrawn from service. Engine no. NG147, the last Kalahari, was plinthed next to the now unused Avontuur Station while the red no. NG122 Starking is on display at the Outeniqua Transport Museum in George.

== Works numbers ==
The builders, works numbers and SAR renumbering of the Class NG15 locomotives are listed in the table.

Builder	Works no.	Year built	Tsumeb no.	SAR no.
Henschel	21905	1931		NG 17
Henschel	21906	1931		NG 18
Henschel	21907	1931		NG 19
Henschel	24475	1938		NG117
Henschel	24476	1938		NG118
Henschel	24477	1938		NG119
Franco-Belge	2667	1949		NG120
Franco-Belge	2668	1949		NG121
Franco-Belge	2669	1949		NG122
Franco-Belge	2670	1949		NG123
Franco-Belge	2671	1949		NG124
Franco-Belge	2682	1952		NG132
Franco-Belge	2683	1952		NG133
Franco-Belge	2684	1952		NG134
Franco-Belge	2685	1952		NG135
Franco-Belge	2686	1952		NG136
Henschel	29585	1957	TC1	NG144
Henschel	29586	1957	TC2	NG145
Henschel	29587	1957	TC3	NG146
Henschel	29588	1957	TC4	NG147
Henschel	29589	1957	TC5	NG148

== Current locomotive status ==
Since the status of heritage locomotives is dependent on the attitude and disposition of those in power at the time, the current status as set out in the table is liable to change.

Number	Country	Current location	Notes
NG17	South Africa	Sandstone Estates	In running order
NG18	(United States) USA	Hempstead & Northern RR, Texas.	Exported from South Africa to the US in 1985. Currently out of service.
NG19	South Africa	Sandstone Estates	Purchased from SATS for the ACR but never used. Now in dry storage albeit in scrap condition.
NG117	South Africa	Humewood Road, Port Elizabeth.	Derelict, boiler on chassis only. Tender scrapped.
NG118	Australia	Bennett Brook Railway, Perth, Western Australia.	Exported from South Africa to Australia in 1985. In service on the railway from 15 October 1994 through to 2003.
NG119	South Africa	Humewood Road, Port Elizabeth.	Stored in serviceable condition.
NG120	England	Darnall Trust	Privately owned in the UK and under assessment for restoration.
NG121	England	Vale of Rheidol Railway Museum Collection	Stored at a private site in southern England. Part of Collection X.
NG122	South Africa	Outeniqua Transport Museum in George	
NG123	Australia	Bennett Brook Railway, Perth, Western Australia.	Exported from South Africa to Australia in 1985. Under overhaul in May 2017. Underwent a major overhaul starting in May 2017, currently returning to service after a successful day operating on the 2 June 2025.
NG124	South Africa	Humewood Road depot in Port Elizabeth.	Stored in a serviceable condition.
NG133	Wales	Festiniog Railway Company	Acquired for potential use on the Welsh Highland Railway in 1997. Stored in scrap condition at the Dinas station of the Welsh Highland Railway (Caernarfon).
NG134	Wales	Festiniog Railway Company	Acquired by Welsh Highland Railway in 1997. Entered passenger service in 2025.
NG135	England	Exmoor Steam Railway	Stored in scrap condition.
NG136	South Africa	Sandstone Estates	In dry storage. Acquired from Schinznacher Baumschulbahn (Switzerland) in April 2008.
NG146	England	Vale of Rheidol Railway Museum Collection	Stored at a private site in southern England. Part of Collection X.
NG147	South Africa	Outside Avontuur station.	On static display. Cosmetically in good condition.

== Illustration ==
The main picture shows Franco-Belge-built no. NG124 equipped with smoke deflectors, crossing the Van Stadens River with the Apple Express on 26 October 1985.

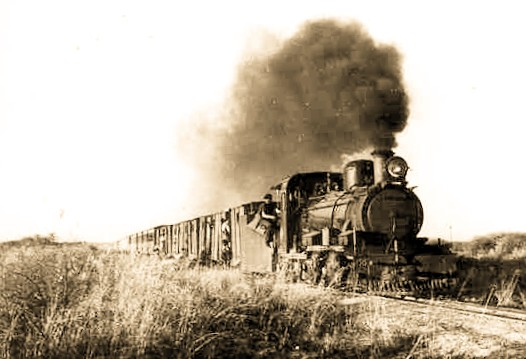
Class NG15 on the Otavi Railway, driver riding outside, c. 1932

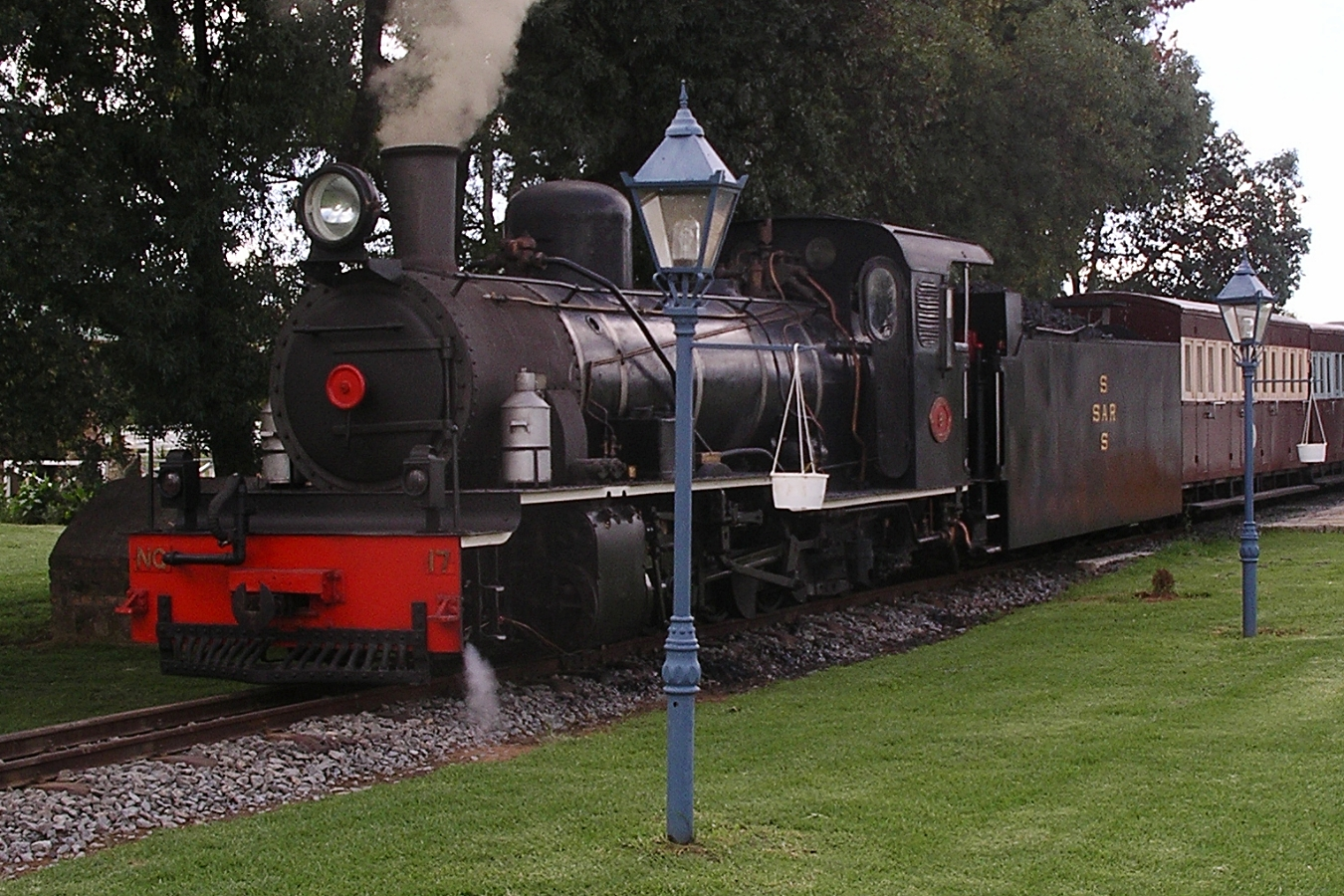
Henschel-built no. NG17 at Sandstone Estates, 25 February 2005

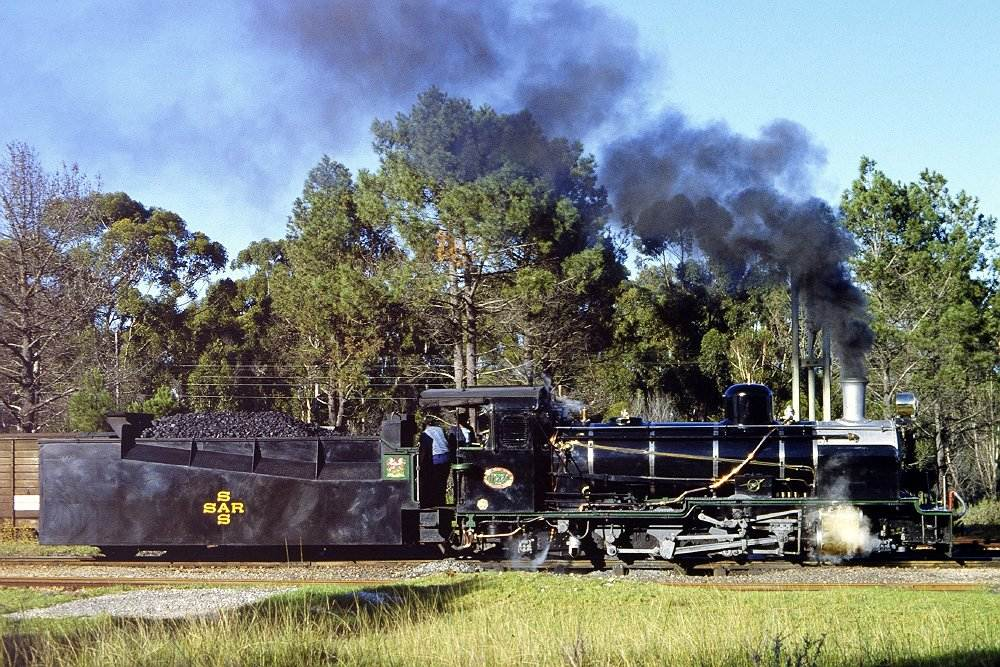
Franco-Belge-built no. NG124 at Van Stadens station, 8 April 1985

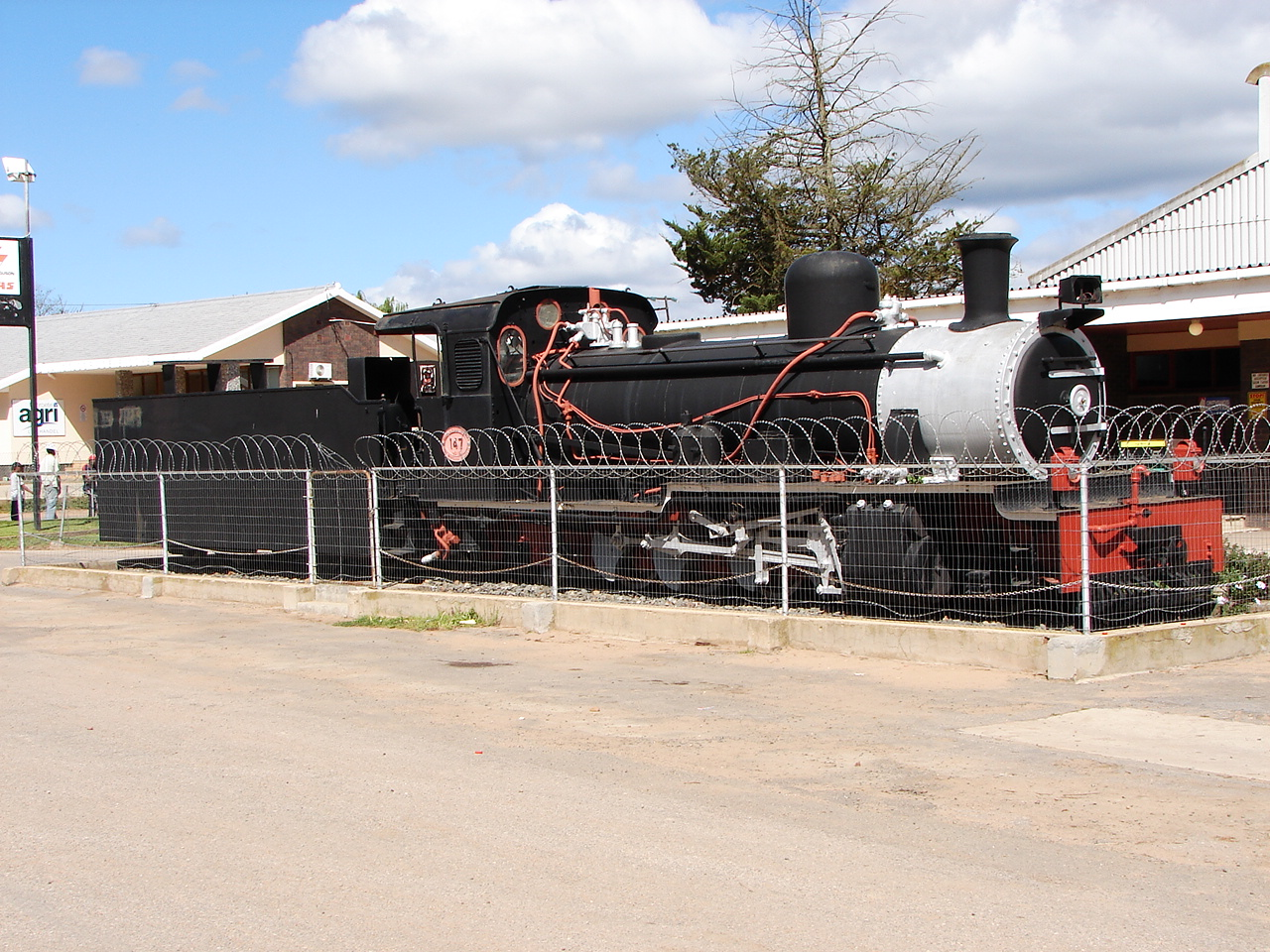
Henschel-built no. NG147 at Avontuur, 18 October 2009
