= 2016 Australian regional television realignment =

The 2016 Australian regional television realignment occurred on 1 July 2016, when a major series of affiliation changes occurred in Australian regional television; WIN Television, a chain of regional stations that had historically been affiliated with Nine Network, switched its affiliation to Network Ten. At the same time, Southern Cross Ten stations outside of Northern New South Wales switched to Nine Network. Several Network Ten-affiliated digital television stations co-owned by WIN also switched to Nine, by virtue of WIN's primary stations taking on the affiliation with Network Ten.

Nine's decision not to renew its affiliation with WIN stemmed from a lawsuit the broadcaster filed in February 2016, in which WIN alleged that Nine was violating its affiliation agreement by broadcasting into regional areas via internet streams on its catch-up service 9Now. The lawsuit was dismissed after a judge ruled that the definition of "broadcasting" in the affiliation agreement only gave WIN exclusive rights to carry Nine Network programming on free-to-air terrestrial television in its designated regions, and did not account for digital streaming.

== Background ==
Under Australian law, commercial free-to-air television broadcasters are subject to an ownership cap known as the "reach rule", dictating that a single broadcaster's stations may not serve more than 75% of the population. As a result, the major Australian television networks only have owned-and-operated stations in the major metropolitan centres of the country, and rely on affiliates to distribute their programming in the "regional" areas of Australia.

Nine Network's affiliate in regional Queensland, Victoria, and Southern New South Wales was WIN Television; WIN's owner Bruce Gordon is a 14.99% shareholder in Nine's parent company Nine Entertainment Co. In December 2015, following alleged disputes over fees paid to the network for regional rights to its programming, Nine and WIN had agreed to a "last-minute" extension of their current affiliation through June 2016. Deutsche Bank reported that WIN Television was now required to pay 45% of revenue from Nine programming to the network, although these numbers were disputed.

== Developments ==
In February 2016, Nine Network launched 9Now, an online service offering video-on-demand access to its programmes, as well as live streaming of the network's schedule. Following the launch of 9Now, WIN Television sued Nine Entertainment Co., alleging that the company had breached its affiliation agreement by broadcasting into regional areas via the 9Now service. Justice Hammerschlag of the NSW Supreme Court dismissed the case on 28 April 2016, ruling that the affiliation agreement's definition of "broadcasting" only applied to transmission via terrestrial, free-to-air television, and did not cover other means of transmission, such as over the internet.

On 29 April 2016, Nine Network announced that it had reached a new, five-year affiliation deal with Southern Cross Austereo, which would see its previously Network Ten-affiliated Southern Cross Ten stations switch to Nine Network effective 1 July 2016, replacing the WIN stations. The deal also called for Southern Cross to provide national advertising sales services for Nine's O&Os NTD and NBN. Under the $500 million deal, Southern Cross pays half of its local revenue from Nine Network programming to the network.

Southern Cross's switch led to reports that Network Ten was already in negotiations with WIN to replace Nine on its stations; Bruce Gordon is also a 14.99% shareholder in Ten Network Holdings, and WIN ran Ten affiliates as joint ventures with Prime Media Group (Mildura, Western Australia), and Southern Cross (Tasmania) alongside its own Nine Network affiliates. The Sydney Morning Herald reported via sources that WIN could achieve a more favourable revenue sharing deal with Ten due to the large number of Ten-affiliated stations it would own if it affiliated. Although the network has historically struggled in comparison to its competitors, Ten's ratings had recently seen improvements due to recent successes such as Big Bash League cricket, I'm a Celebrity...Get Me Out of Here!, and MasterChef Australia. On 23 May 2016, Network Ten officially announced that it had reached a five-year affiliation deal with WIN, also beginning on 1 July 2016.

== Changes ==
=== Affected areas ===
Stations involved in the realignment by market
Market	Station	Affiliation before switch (branding)	Affiliation after switch (branding)	Current affiliation (branding)
New South Wales/ACT
Northern New South Wales	NRN	Network Ten (Southern Cross Ten)	Network Ten (Channel Ten)	Network Ten (Channel 10)
Southern New South Wales and ACT	CTC	Network Ten (Southern Cross Ten)	Nine Network (Channel 9)	same
Southern New South Wales and ACT	WIN	Nine Network (WIN)	Network Ten (WIN)	same
Griffith and MIA	AMN	Nine Network (WIN)	Network Ten (WIN)	same
Griffith and MIA	MDN	Network Ten (WIN Ten)	Nine Network (Channel 9)	same
Victoria
Regional Victoria	GLV; BCV	Network Ten (Southern Cross Ten)	Nine Network (Channel 9)	same
Regional Victoria	VTV	Nine Network (WIN)	Network Ten (WIN)	same
Mildura and Sunraysia	MDV	Network Ten (Ten Mildura)	Nine Network (Channel 9)	same
Mildura and Sunraysia	STV	Nine Network (WIN)	Network Ten (WIN)	same
Queensland
Regional Queensland	RTQ	Nine Network (WIN)	Network Ten (WIN)	same
Regional Queensland	TNQ	Network Ten (Southern Cross Ten)	Nine Network (Channel 9)	same
South Australia
Mount Gambier and Riverland	MGS; LRS	Network Ten (WIN Ten)	Network Ten (WIN)	same
Mount Gambier and Riverland	SDS; RDS	Nine Network (WIN)	Nine Network (Channel 9)	same
Tasmania
Tasmania	TDT	Network Ten (TDT Ten)	Nine Network (Channel 9)	same
Tasmania	TVT	Nine Network (WIN)	Network Ten (WIN)	same
Western Australia
Regional and Remote; Western Australia	SDW; VDW; GDW; WDW	Network Ten (WDT Ten)	Nine Network (Channel 9)	same
Regional and Remote; Western Australia	WOW	Nine Network (WIN)	Network Ten (WIN)	same

In the markets where WIN co-owned Section 38B digital stations affiliated with Network Ten alongside a WIN-owned Nine station, the Ten affiliation moved to the former Nine stations, and the digital joint venture stations switched to Nine Network. Mildura Digital Television and Tasmanian Digital Television were able to reach affiliation deals with Nine shortly before 1 July in order to facilitate these affiliation swaps.

West Digital Television (co-owned by WIN and Southern Cross Media Group) was unable to reach an affiliation deal with Nine in time for the switchover, with the co-owners stating that Nine had been actively rejecting offers. On 1 July 2016, WDT halted its programming and began broadcasting a loop of scenic video with a scrolling message stating that programming was unavailable. On the evening of 2 July 2016, Nine reached an affiliation deal with WDT; at around 7:30 p.m. WST, WDT began broadcasting Nine Network programming by joining its federal election coverage already in progress.

Southern Cross-owned NRN in Northern NSW was not affected by the swap, as Nine already owned NBN as an O&O for the region. On 28 March 2017, Southern Cross announced that it had agreed to sell NRN to WIN for $55 million, in a deal which was completed on 31 May 2017.

=== Aftermath ===
The affiliation swap was reversed on 1 July 2021, when the Nine Network reached a seven-year affiliation deal with WIN, and Southern Cross subsequently reached a two-year deal with 10.
