= Prime7 =

Australian television network

- Country: Australia
- Broadcast area: Northern NSW & Gold Coast, Southern NSW & ACT, Regional Victoria, Mildura
- Network: Seven Network (O&O)
- Headquarters: Watson, Canberra

Programming
- Language: English
- Picture format: HDTV 1080i (downscaled to 16:9 576i for the SD feed)

Ownership
- Owner: Seven West Media
- Sister channels: Racing.com; ishop TV; 7two; 7mate; 7flix

History
- Launched: 17 March 1962
- Closed: 30 June 2022
- Replaced by: Seven Network
- Former names: CBN/CWN (1965–1973); RVN/AMV (1971–1985); Television 6-8-9 (1973–1981); Great Eastland Television (NEN) (1975–1987); 9-8 Television (NEN) (1981–1989); Mid State Television (CBN) (1981–1988); The Prime Network (AMV) (1985–1988); Prime Television/Ten Prime/7 on Prime/7Prime (1988–2011)

Availability

Terrestrial
- Freeview Prime7 owned (virtual): 6/61
- Freeview Prime7 HD (virtual): 60

Prime7, formerly Prime Television and other names, was an Australian television network. Prime Television launched on 17 March 1962 as CBN-8 in Orange, and later expanded to cover regional New South Wales, Victoria and the Australian Capital Territory. It was initially an independent affiliate owned by Prime Media Group before the network, and its sister GWN7, were acquired by Seven West Media on 31 December 2021.

Prime7 along with GWN7's national broadcast facilities were based in Canberra, with playout facilities (since 2021) shared with hybrid-funded broadcaster SBS Television at a facility operated by Australian telecommunications provider Telstra. Seven West Media head office/administration is located in Pyrmont, Sydney.

== History ==
=== Origins ===
Prime Television originally began as a group of separate stations and networks – Midstate Television in Orange, Dubbo and Griffith; RVN/AMV in Wagga Wagga and Albury; and 9-8 Television in Tamworth and Taree.

CBN-8 Orange first aired on 17 March 1962, followed by CWN-6 Dubbo on 1 December 1965, and MTN-9 Griffith began on 15 December 1965. CBN and CWN were both licensed to Country Television Services (also the owner of radio station 2GZ in Orange). CWN was a full-time relay of CBN—the first Australian television station to relay another. The two stations thus formed the country's first regional television network.

RVN-2 Wagga Wagga began broadcasting on 19 June 1964, while AMV-4 Albury launched on 7 September 1964. The two stations merged in 1971 as the Riverina and North East Victoria Television Service Pty Ltd with the callsign RVN/AMV on air.

In northern New South Wales, NEN-9 Tamworth began transmission on 27 September 1965, with a relay in Armidale (NEN-1, later NEN-10) on 15 July 1966. ECN-8 Taree started on 27 May 1966. At one stage, ECN-8 merged with NRN-11 Coffs Harbour (now Network 10's owned and operated station), however the two stations eventually split. NEN later merged with ECN as 9-8 Television.

=== Television 6-8-9 ===
As a result of the financial difficulties that many independent stations faced, MTN-9 joined CWN-6 and CBN-8 to form Television 6-8-9 in 1973. Relays were launched in Portland, Lithgow, Mudgee, Cobar, Kandos and Rylstone and Bathurst. In 1981, 6-8-9 changed its name to Midstate Television.

Colour television was introduced at the same time as the rest of the country, on 1 March 1975 – one of the single most expensive processes undertaken by CBN to date. The station was a prominent broadcaster of local sporting events including tennis and rugby. In 1979, a documentary titled Goin' Down The Road, about the 1978 National Rodeo Titles won the network a Logie award for an 'Outstanding Contribution by a Regional Station'.

Midstate produced a number of local programs, including the Weekend Report, Early Shift, Rural Roundup and Around the Schools. From 1968, CBN was able to access a Postmaster-General's Department microwave link for national news bulletins and major events.

=== Aggregation ===
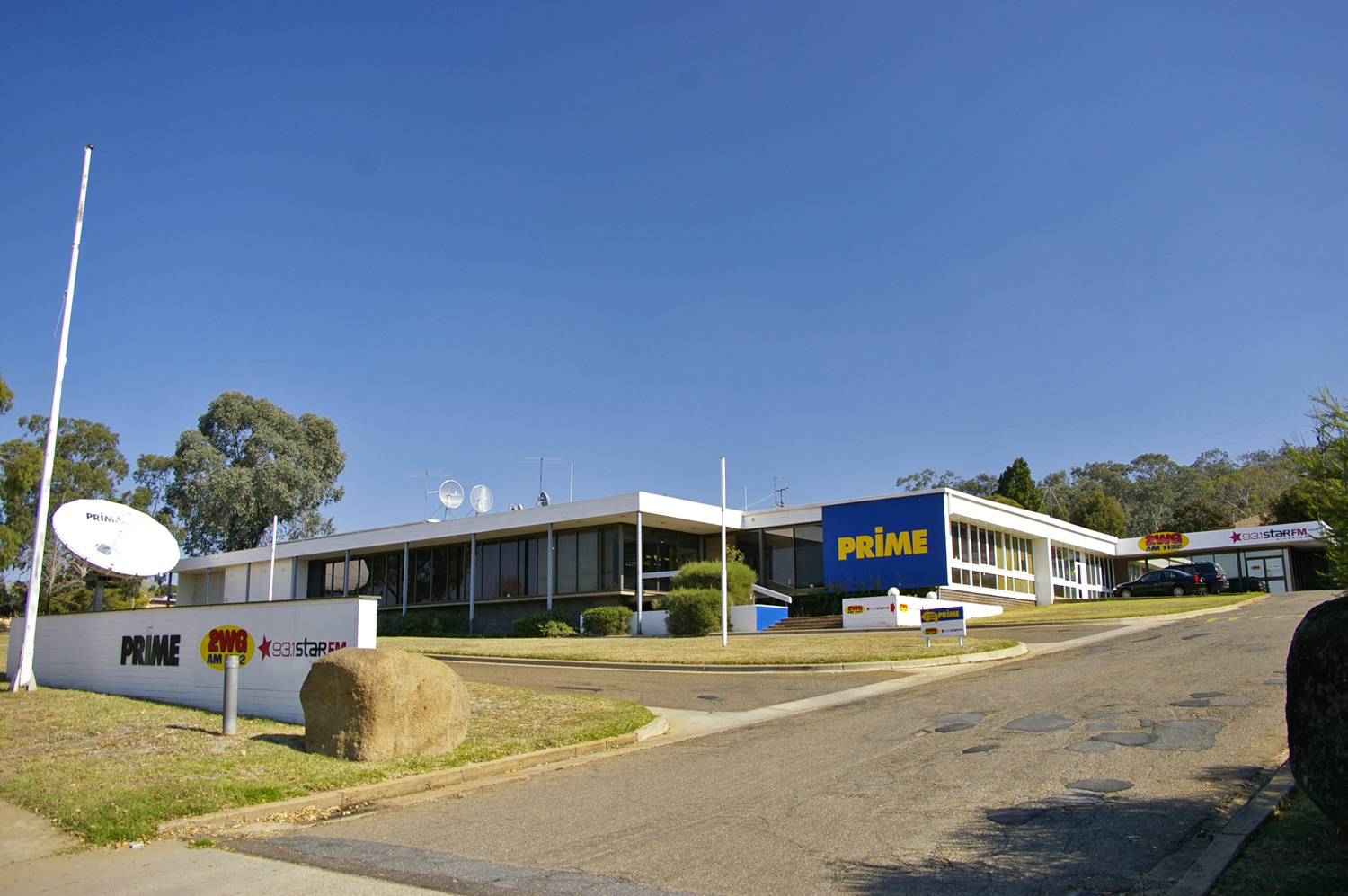
Former RVN/AMV Television Centre at Lake Albert Road, Kooringal in 2008, now occupied by Generocity Church.

Midstate Television was bought out by media magnate Paul Ramsay's Ramcorp in October 1987. It was soon merged with Ramcorp's other stations, RVN/AMV and NEN/ECN. In 1988, Midstate Television was renamed Prime Television and began to show increased Seven Network programming in readiness for aggregation.

When aggregation took place, Prime began broadcasting to both southern New South Wales and northern Victoria. Transmission problems meant that aggregation in southern New South Wales took place in two stages – first the Australian Capital Territory and NSW south coast on 31 March 1989, followed by Orange, Dubbo, and Wagga Wagga on 31 December 1989. These changes led to the de-merger of RVN-AMV, with RVN becoming CBN-2.

Griffith remained a one-station market, however instead of taking programming from Prime in line with the network's other stations, MTN-9 relayed programming mainly from WIN Television in southern New South Wales. A supplementary licence, AMN-31, was successfully bid for by MTN in 1996, providing a relay of Prime Television. Soon after the station was purchased by WIN Television, which undertook a number of minor changes – mainly changing the news service to WIN News, and using entirely WIN branding. AMN-31 remains a relay of Prime. Similarly, the Mildura licence area remained separate from the remainder of Victoria, albeit with a single station, STV-8, later bought out by WIN Television in 1996. In 1997 Prime was successful in bidding for a new licence for the area at a cost of $3.2 million. PTV-31 began broadcasting the following year.

Although advertising revenue increased post-aggregation, local programming declined as a result of the costs incurred by the network's expansion – an estimated $45 million had been spent by Ramcorp during and in the lead-up to aggregation. After losses of $50 million, it was not until 1993 that the renamed Prime Television posted a profit.

In November 1996, Prime's parent company, Prime Television, purchased the Golden West Network, a merged group of four stations in regional Western Australia; BTW-3 Bunbury, VEW-8 Kalgoorlie, GTW-11 Geraldton and GSW-9 Albany. Western Australia, similar to Griffith and Mildura, remained a one-station commercial market until 1999 when GWN became a Seven Network affiliate, after WIN Television began transmission as an affiliate of both the Nine Network and Network Ten.

The network began to expand into New Zealand in 1997, when a number of licences were purchased from United Christian Broadcasters for an estimated $3.6 million. Prime Television New Zealand began broadcasting on 30 August 1998, with a nightly local news program in both Waikato and Christchurch. Prime also expanded into Argentina with the purchase of the Canal 9 network.

=== 2000s ===
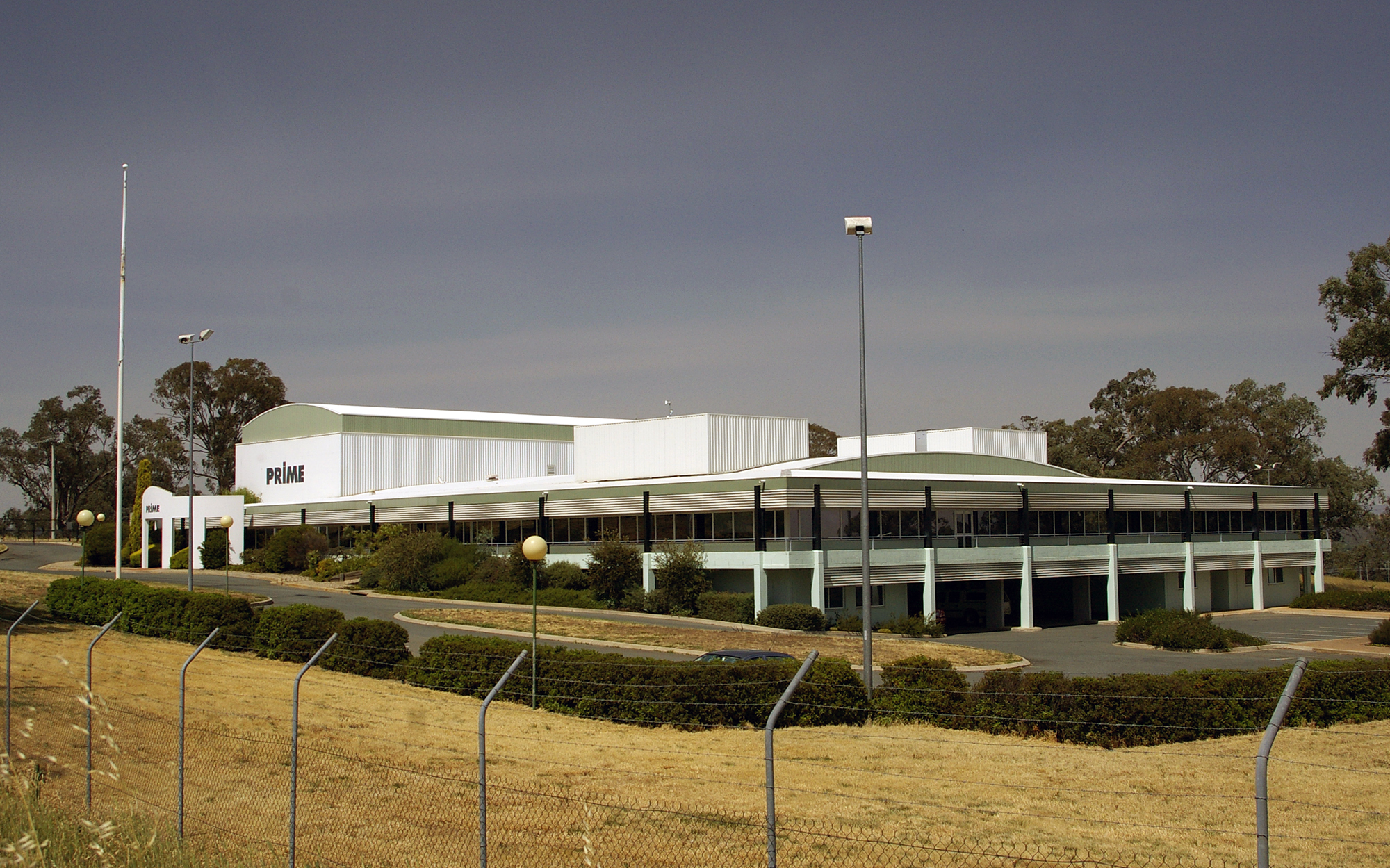
Prime Television Broadcast Centre in Watson, Australian Capital Territory

The renamed Argentine network Azul Televisión was sold for $108 million in early 2000 due to lower-than-expected performance. During the same year, Prime benefited greatly from its affiliation with the Seven Network throughout its carriage of the 2000 Summer Olympics in Sydney. The network's relationship with Seven was further developed throughout the early 2000s, leading to the introduction of 7onPrime promotional branding for Seven Network-produced programs on 11 February 2001.

Local news bulletins for Newcastle, the Gold Coast, Canberra, and Wollongong were axed on 9 June 2001 due to falling ratings and the anticipated costs of the switch to digital television. This, and the closure of a number of news bulletins by Southern Cross Broadcasting, prompted the Australian Broadcasting Authority to investigate the adequacy of regional news services The ABA later mandated that stations broadcast a minimum level of local content, based on a points system – two points per minute for local news, and one point per minute for other local content, excluding paid advertisements.

Prime formed a partnership with the Nine Network (affiliated in Australia to competitor WIN Television), giving its owner, PBL Media the option to purchase a 50% share of Prime Television New Zealand in return for access to original programming, and cross-promotion in PBL's New Zealand magazine titles. Following this, Prime Television New Zealand began to take on branding and programming similar to that of the Nine Network. In November 2005, Prime Television New Zealand was purchased by subscription television provider Sky Network Television for NZ$30,000,000, completed after approval by New Zealand's Commerce Commission in February 2006.

Mildura Digital Television, a digital-only station in Mildura began transmissions in 2006 as a joint venture between Prime Television and WIN Corporation. Section 38B of the Broadcasting Services Act allowed for the provision of a third station owned by either one or both existing networks. MDT is a direct relay of 10 Melbourne, albeit with local advertising.

Prime Television announced on 21 December 2009 that it would start broadcasting 7two on 23 December 2009.

=== 2010s ===
On 25 September 2010, Prime began transmission of the new HD digital channel 7mate aimed at men 16–49. The first program to be broadcast was the drawn 2010 AFL Grand Final. On 15 January 2011, Prime Media Group reported that Prime and GWN were set to rebrand as Prime7 and GWN7 respectively. Their news bulletins had quickly changed their names to Prime7 News and GWN7 News, while 7two dropped the "Prime" logo on the multichannels. Prime and GWN relaunched on 16 January 2011 at 18:00 (6pm). Prime7 began broadcasting 4ME (then Television 4) on 18 September 2011 on LCN 64. Prime7 began broadcasting ishop TV on 30 April 2013 on LCN 65.

Prime7 ceased to broadcast 4ME on 30 April 2016, due to financial problems.

In December 2016, Prime7 transferred its playout facilities to MediaHub Australia located within the Sydney suburb of Ingleburn. The facility is a joint venture between public broadcaster Australian Broadcasting Corporation and rival regional network WIN Television. Network officials noted that its existing Canberra facilities cannot be upgraded with technological advancements, causing Prime7 to be incapable of relaunching its HD simulcast as well as introducing 7flix to its viewers.

On 3 August 2017, 18 months after launching in metropolitan areas, Prime7 announced that it would carry 7flix to its regional stations in northern and southern New South Wales, regional Victoria and Mildura from 3 September 2017. The channel became available on digital channel 66 in MPEG-4 format. On 15 January 2018, Prime7 quietly relaunched its primary HD service, Prime7 HD, on digital channel 60 in MPEG-4 format.

=== 2021: Merger with Seven ===
On 1 November 2021, Seven West Media announced that it would acquire all the shares and subsidiaries of Prime Media Group, including Prime7. This was Seven West Media's second attempt at purchasing Prime, after its previous attempt in 2019 was thwarted by Australian Community Media boss Antony Catalano and rival WIN Corporation owner Bruce Gordon, who cited Seven's debt problems at the time and its poor ratings performance as their reason for their refusal. This development would mark an end to the Prime branding after 33 years in favour of the Seven Network's branding, and would see all news bulletins carry the Seven News brand. Prior to this, Prime7 (and sister GWN7 in regional and remote Western Australia), as well as Nine affiliate Imparja Television were the only networks not to fully use its metro affiliate branding despite carrying Seven (Nine for Imparja) branded promos, since WIN Television (except for WIN News) and Southern Cross Austereo use full Nine, 10 and Seven branding on their stations. It was also announced that Seven would look to expand its investment in local news following the merger. The majority of Prime's shareholders voted in favour of the deal on 23 December, with the sale completed on 31 December.

On 23 May 2022, Seven West Media announced that the current branding of Prime7 and GWN7 would be unified into Seven Network branding across all stations including for Prime7 Local News, officially retiring the Prime7 name.

In June 2022, the Prime7 brand was retired.

On 22 July 2022, the final retirement of the Prime7 branding took place with all local news bulletins becoming "7NEWS (region)" for example "7NEWS Border" as of Monday 25 July.

== Programming ==
Prime's programming schedule was almost identical to those of Seven Network metropolitan counterparts ATN in Sydney and HSV in Melbourne, with some differences. Since the Prime network's inception it featured a broad range of original local programming, which included children's program Possum's Club with Madelaine Collignon and station mascot Prime Possum as well as community service segment Prime7 InfoNet, a series of short updates listing local community events.

Prime7's overnight schedule also differed from the Seven Network feed, containing infomercials from Danoz Direct, Home Shopping, and a feed from pay television channel Expo. Past programming from Prime Television has been recognised nationally, with some local productions winning the Logie Award for 'Outstanding Contribution by a Regional Television Station'. The network has won Logies for Goin' Down The Road (CBN-8, 1979), Naturally (NEN-9/ECN-8, 1984), Stranded (Prime Television, 1993), Rest in Peace (Prime Television, 1994), and No Time For Frailty (Prime Television, 1996).

== Prime7 News ==
Seven News Regional (formerly known as Prime7 News and Prime News) was the network's local news service. Full bulletins were produced for the towns and surrounding regions originally covered by the stations "Midstate 6,8,9 Television", Dubbo/Orange, "RVN-2/AMV-4", Wagga Wagga/Albury and "9/8 Television" (NEN-9/ECN-8) Tamworth/Taree, prior to the aggregation of regional television services in New South Wales that occurred in the early 1990s. In other areas two-minute news updates were shown at various times of the day.

Prime7 News bulletins were presented from Canberra weeknightly as Prime7 Local News at 18:00 (6pm) in the Albury and Wodonga Border, North West, North Coast, Central West and Wagga Wagga broadcast areas. Prime7 News at 6:30 (with Daniel Gibson) (at 18:30) also came from the Canberra news centre.

== Availability ==
Prime7 was available in standard definition digital format. Since June 2007 a 1080i high definition simulcast had also been available, replacing the network's former 576p service. Prime7 was viewed mainly through free-to-air terrestrial transmitters, although subscription cable also provided by TransACT and Neighbourhood Cable in the Australian Capital Territory and Ballarat, respectively.

Prime7 broadcast to southern New South Wales through stations based in Orange and Dubbo, northern New South Wales from stations in Tamworth and Taree, Victoria from its Albury-Wodonga-based station AMV and Mildura via PTV.

=== Prime7 HD ===
Prime7 HD originally launched on 15 October 2007 as a sister to the Seven Network's high definition simulcast, Seven HD. Then-known as Prime HD, it broadcast in 1080i high definition on digital channel 60 on Prime's regional stations NEN Northern New South Wales, CBN Southern New South Wales, AMV Victoria and PTV Mildura. The channel broadcast breakaway programming from 10 December 2007 until 4 October 2009, when it was turned into a straight HD simulcast. Prime HD fully ceased broadcasting on 25 September 2010 with the launch of the HD channel 7mate. Prime7 re-launched their HD simulcast service, now known as Prime7 HD on 15 January 2018.

== Logos ==
Prime Television became a network in May 1988, with shared logos produced and used across the regional stations, featuring the word Prime Television either above an outlined triangle or rectangle. Aggregation occurred across the network on 31 March 1989, along with the introduction of a green logo featuring the word Prime with the letter i dotted with a stylised globe, introduced in December 1988. This logo was used on its own across the network until 1996, when a new circular logo was introduced in 1990. Following a decade in use, 2001 saw the launch of a new simplified yellow logo, with the removal of the circle. This logo was launched concurrently with a similarly design logo on the Golden West Network. Following the 2011 relaunch, a new red logo was introduced which incorporates the Seven Network logo. The relaunch logo featuring Seven Network was revised in 2012 from multi colour to be a single colour logo.

1988–1990

1990 – 10 February 2001

11 February 2001 – 16 January 2011

16 January 2011 – 25 July 2022

== See also ==
- Regional television in Australia
- Channel Seven
