= STV (TV station) =

Television station in Mildura, Victoria

- Mildura, Victoria; Australia
- Channels: Digital: 7 (VHF); Virtual: 8
- Branding: Nine, WIN

Programming
- Language: English
- Network: WIN Television
- Affiliations: Nine

Ownership
- Owner: WIN Corporation Pty Ltd; (WIN Television Mildura Pty Ltd)

History
- First air date: 27 November 1965
- Former channel number: Analog: 8 (VHF) (1965-2010)
- Former affiliations: Independent (27 November 1965 – 30 June 1997); Southern Cross TV8 (1982–1989); VIC Television (1989–1994); Nine Network (1 July 1997 – 30 June 2016, 1 July 2021 – present); Network 10 (secondary, 1 July 1997 – 2006, 1 July 2016 – 30 June 2021)
- Call sign meaning: Sunraysia Television Victoria

Technical information
- Licensing authority: Australian Communications and Media Authority
- ERP: 50 kW
- HAAT: 152 m
- Transmitter coordinates: 34°22′47″S 142°11′18″E

Links
- Public licence information: Profile
- Website: www.wintv.com.au

STV is an Australian television station licensed to and serving the regions surrounding Mildura, Victoria, owned and operated by the WIN Corporation and part of the WIN Television network. The station commenced transmissions on 27 November 1965.

== History ==
During the 1970s, STV formed a programming and operational affiliation with GLV-10 (later GLV-8) in Traralgon and BCV-8 in Bendigo – a partnership expanded upon in 1982 with the establishment of a single on-air identity and programming schedule across the three stations, known originally as Southern Cross TV8 and later, the Southern Cross Network.

Alan Bond's Bond Media brought STV in March 1989, for $18 million, from then-owners Sunraysia Television, after they acquired Channel Nine Perth from Bond who were forced to sell it due to cross-media ownership laws restricting national audience reach. They paid A$95 million for the Perth station. Bond later onsold the station to ENT Ltd. later that same year in May and split from the Southern Cross Network shortly afterwards to join the VICTV Television Victoria network, which also encompassed GMV-6 Shepparton and BTV-6 Ballarat and following aggregation, extended its transmission area into Bendigo, Albury and Gippsland. However, Mildura was not included in aggregation. The VIC TV network (including STV) was sold to WIN Television in 1994. STV were the only commercial television station and as an independent affiliate broadcast a mixture of programs from the three commercial networks in 1965 to 1997.

Mildura did not gain an addition television service until 1 July 1997, when Prime Television launched to become a Seven Network affiliate while WIN Mildura became a dual Nine and Ten affiliate. On 30 June 2010, the station ceased broadcasting on analogue as part of the digital TV switchover in the Mildura area.

On 1 July 2016, as part of a wide national re-alignment of regional television, STV swapped affiliations with MDV switching from Nine Network to Network Ten, rebroadcasting a feed of ATV-10 from Melbourne with local ads.

On 1 July 2021, as part of a wide national re-alignment of regional television, STV swapped affiliations with MDV switching back from Network 10 to the Nine Network.

=== Programming ===
WIN Mildura broadcasts its programming from Channel Nine.

=== WIN News Sunraysia ===
For nearly 50 years, the station produced regional news bulletins from its Mildura studios. In later years, WIN News programs were presented from VTV's studios in Ballarat. WIN ceased its Sunraysia news operations in May 2015, at the same time WIN ceased its Mackay news operations.

In November 2025, WIN News relaunched a local bulletin for the Mildura – Sunraysia region, presented by Bruce Roberts from the networks Wollongong studios.

As a current Nine Network partner, it broadcasts the national and Victorian Nine News editions and A Current Affair.
