= Ishop TV =

Australian digital advertorial datacasting channel

ishop TV
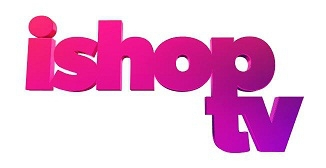
- Country: Australia
- Broadcast area: Southern NSW, Northern NSW, Regional VIC, Mildura, Western Australia
- Network: Seven (Prime7 and Seven Regional WA)

Programming
- Language: English
- Picture format: 576i SDTV

Ownership
- Owner: Seven West Media; Brand Developers

History
- Launched: 30 April 2013; 13 years ago
- Closed: 1 April 2024; 2 years ago
- Replaced by: TVSN (channel space)

ishop TV was an Australian free-to-air home shopping, teleshopping channel and associated advertorial datacasting service that was launched on 30 April 2013 which was co-operated by Prime Media Group and Brand Developers. Launching officially on 30 April 2013 (a day earlier than expected), it became available as part of the multiplexes for Prime7 and Seven Regional WA even after their acquisition into Seven West Media in 2021.

The network was wound down on 1 April 2024 and was later replaced by the move of competitor TVSN from Network 10 to Seven Network.

== See also ==
- List of digital television channels in Australia
- Seven West Media
- 7 Regional
- 4ME
