= VTV (Australian TV station) =

- Regional Victoria; Australia
- Channels: Digital: see table below
- Branding: Nine, WIN

Programming
- Language: English
- Affiliations: Nine

Ownership
- Owner: WIN Corporation; (WIN Television Vic Pty Ltd)

History
- First air date: 23 December 1961 (GMV6); 27 April 1962 (BTV6); 1 January 1992 (VTV)
- Former call signs: GMV (1961–1992); BTV (1962–1992); RTV (1989–1992, proposed)
- Former channel number: see table below
- Former affiliations: Independent (1961–1991); Nine Network (1992–2016); Network 10 (2016–2021)
- Call sign meaning: Vic Television Victoria

Technical information
- Licensing authority: ACMA
- ERP: see table below
- HAAT: see table below
- Transmitter coordinates: see table below

Links
- Public licence information: Profile
- Website: www.wintv.com.au

VTV is an Australian television station broadcasting in regional Victoria in Australia. The network was owned by ENT Ltd., before being purchased by the WIN Corporation.

== Network history ==
VICTV Television Victoria began as a network of several stations serving northern and western Victoria:

- GMV-6 Shepparton (launched on 23 December 1961)
- BTV-6 Ballarat (launched on 27 April 1962)
- STV-8 Mildura (launched on 27 November 1965).

Television Victoria was owned and operated by Examiner-Northern TV Ltd, a company which already owned TVT-6 Hobart as well as GMV-6 and BTV-6. Shortly after they purchased STV-8 in 1990, the three Victorian stations took on the on-air identity of VIC TV - Television Victoria, providing a single programming service across all three stations with separate regional news services for each area. As each of the 3 stations aired mostly Nine Network programming especially in the lead up to the VIC TV launch, the new network became, in preparation for the 1992 aggregation of broadcasts, the state level Nine affiliate. Until 1987 these stations aired HSV's Seven News and from that year onward these stations began to broadcast Nine News from GTV.

On 1 January 1992, aggregation of regional television took place in Victoria. VIC Television extended their transmission area to incorporate the Bendigo, Albury and Gippsland area markets and officially confirmed as the Nine Network affiliate for most of regional Victoria. However, the Mildura market was not aggregated until 1997 when Prime Television finally launched as a Seven Network affiliate and WIN carried both Nine and Network Ten affiliations. VIC Television had already entered into a program supply agreement with the Nine Network but continued to maintain news services in each of the six regional markets in which it now operated. The official callsigns of GMV and BTV were consolidated into a single callsign of VTV. STV-8 kept its own callsign as it was excluded from the area affected by aggregation.

In October 1994, ENT Ltd. sold VIC Television to the WIN Corporation which already operated WIN Television stations in New South Wales, Canberra and Queensland and VIC became WIN Victoria. The stations are now part of the WIN Television network and on the day of its transition, the VIC logo was replaced to mark the change of ownership for the channels with the golden WIN logo used in the eastern states while the 9 dots from the Nine Network logo, which debuted in 1992 for VIC Television's aggregation, were retained until 2006.

On 1 July 2016, as part of a wide national re-alignment of regional television, VTV swapped affiliations with GLV/BCV switching from Nine Network to Network Ten, but VTV rebroadcast a feed of ATV-10 from Melbourne with local ads.

On 1 July 2021, as the reverse of the 2016 affiliation swap, VTV swapped affiliations again with GLV/BCV from Network 10 to the Nine Network but VTV rebroadcasts a feed of GTV-9 from Melbourne with local ads.

The stations is affiliated with the metropolitan Nine Network and also broadcasts most of Nine's sub-channels (9Gem, 9Go! and 9Life) except it doesn't broadcast 9Rush.

=== BTV-6 Ballarat & Western Victoria ===
BTV-6 opened at 7pm on Friday 27 April 1962 with the documentary This is BTV Channel 6. The station produced a wide range of local and part-networked TV programming through its history, most notably the chat show Six Tonight, which aired from 1971 to 1983, eventually also being carried on the Six (BTV6 Ballarat and GMV6 Shepparton) and TV8 (now WIN Television) Networks across much of Victoria, as well as parts of South Australia and New South Wales.

BTV placed a strong emphasis on local news, with the first news bulletin read by Arthur Scuffins on 27 April 1962. The nightly news program, Six News, was extended to 30 minutes in 1980 in response to the ABC dropping their regional news service in the late 1970s. The bulletin was rebranded as NewsCentre 6 in the mid-1980s.

On-air talent included Arthur Scuffins, Eric Gracie, Val Sarah, Craig Campbell, Peter Gamble, Gary Rice, John Garland, Denis Walter, Glenn Ridge, Rob Gaylard, Glenn Driscoll and Fred Fargher.

In late 2000, Ballarat's channel 6 moved to UHF channel 36, in order to allow neighbouring Melbourne station HSV-7 to commence digital television transmissions on Channel 6 without interference.

The area covers towns of Western Victoria, including Ararat, Ballarat, Camperdown, Colac, Daylesford, Hamilton, Horsham, Portland, Maryborough, Stawell, Warrnambool and Warracknabeal.

As well as small towns including Avoca, Apollo Bay, Beaufort, Casterton, Coleraine, Cobden, Creswick, Dimboola, Donald, Edenhope, Halls Gap, Heywood, Koroit, Minyip, Mortlake, Nhill, Port Fairy, Port Campbell, Skipton, St Arnaud, Terang and Timboon

=== GMV-6 Shepparton & Goulburn Valley ===
GMV-6, one of the first regional television stations in Australia, began transmission from Shepparton on 23 December 1961 (the same launch date as BCV-8 Bendigo), broadcasting from a transmitter at Mount Major. Originally, the station was owned in conjunction with local radio station 3SR.

The callsign of GMV referred to its coverage area which included the Goulburn River and Murray River catchment areas. The 'V' refers to Victoria as is the normal protocol for commercial TV station callsigns, where the third letter indicates the state in which the service is licensed.

By the late 1960s, various low powered relay transmitters began operation in the fringes of the GMV region including GMV-3 Eildon, GMV-8 Jerilderie, GMV-10 Deniliquin and GMV-10 Alexandra (later changed to GMV-11).

GMV-6 converted to full scale colour TV transmission on 1 March 1975. By the mid-1980s, transmission hours had extended to commence at 7.00am weekdays, broadcasting until around midnight. Programming included regional news and children's programmes, mixed with programs selected from the three commercial networks in Melbourne; HSV-7 (Seven), GTV-9 (Nine) and ATV-10 (Ten). The evening local news bulletin was supplemented by a relay of the nightly Seven National News from HSV-7 until 1987, and then National Nine News from GTV-9.

== Programming ==
WIN Television broadcasts its programming from Nine Network, including their regional signals of Channel 9, 9Gem, 9Go! and 9Life. WIN also broadcasts Nine's news, current affairs and sport programs including Today, Today Extra, all Nine News bulletins, A Current Affair, 60 Minutes, Sports Sunday, Nine's Wide World of Sports and The AFL Sunday Footy Show throughout its broadcast region. Local news in the 1990s was presented by Geoff Vallance. Reporter Matthew McGrane became his stand-in presenter. Sport was presented by Leith Mulligan with Chief of Staff Brendan Stafford filling in.

VTV simulcasts the nightly and weekday afternoon Melbourne editions of Nine News from GTV-9, along with the national bulletins and current affairs programs from TCN-9 in Sydney and STW-9 in Perth.

== WIN News ==
WIN News produces a statewide news bulletin for six area markets covered by VTV. The program is broadcast from WIN's headquarters at Wollongong in New South Wales.

The six regional news bulletins are:

- Ballarat and Western Victoria
- Bendigo and Central Victoria
- Shepparton and the North East
- Albury, Wodonga and the Goulburn-Murray area
- Gippsland
- Mildura and Sunraysia regions

Reporters and camera crews are based locally at newsrooms in Albury, Ballarat, Bendigo, Mildura,Shepparton and Traralgon.

Previously, separate bulletins were produced for the Ballarat, Gippsland, Shepparton and Albury markets were produced - with studio presentation originating from the Ballarat studios.

The Victorian bulletin is presented by Bruce Roberts with sports presenter Melissa Russell and weather forecasts are presented by Sarah Cawte.

== Main transmitters ==
Region served	City	Channels; Analog; (Digital)	First air date	ERP; Analog (Digital)	HAAT (Note: Height above average terrain (HAAT) estimated using EHAAT from the ITU SRTM3 database here: "Calculation of Effective antenna heights using the SRTM3 database". ITU SRTM3 database. ITU International Telecommunications Union | ITU–R: ITU Radiocommunication.); Analog (Digital)	Transmitter Coordinates	Transmitter Location
Ballarat (Note: The Ballarat station was an independent station with the callsign BTV from its 1962 sign-on until 1989 when the callsign became RTV (shared with Shepparton's GMV), and then changed to VTV in 1991 in preparation for aggregation in 1992.) (Note: Analogue transmissions ceased as of 5 May 2011 as part of the conversion to digital television.)	Ballarat	36 UHF (Note: The Ballarat station was on VHF channel 6 from its 1962 sign-on until late 2000, moving to its current channel in order to accommodate digital television in Melbourne.); (37 UHF)	27 April 1962	2000 kW; (500 kW)	710 m; (713 m)	37°16′57″S 143°14′52″E	Lookout Hill
Bendigo	Bendigo	35 UHF; (54 UHF)	1 January 1992	2000 kW; (1000 kW)	517 m; (505 m)	36°59′32″S 144°18′30″E	Mount Alexander (transmitter damaged in Victorian bushfires, off-air since 9th January 2026)
Goulburn Valley (Note: The Goulburn Valley station was an independent station with the callsign GMV from its 1961 sign-on until aggregation in 1992.)	Shepparton	6 VHF; (9 VHF)	23 December 1961	220 kW; (55 kW)	319 m; (319 m)	36°21′45″S 145°41′11″E	Mount Major
Latrobe Valley	Traralgon	43 UHF; (36 UHF)	1 January 1992	1000 kW; (400 kW)	515 m; (487 m)	38°23′57″S 146°33′53″E (analog); 38°23′37″S 146°33′34″E (digital)	Mount Tassie
Murray River Valley	Swan Hill	(60 UHF)	1 January 1992	400 kW	179 m	35°28′24″S 143°27′20″E	Goschen
Victorian Upper Murray; (Upper Hume region)	Albury	33 UHF; (10 VHF)	1 January 1992	1200 kW; (60 kW)	533 m; (525 m)	36°15′13″S 146°51′20″E	Mount Baranduda
Western Victoria (Note: The Western Victoria station was a relay of BTV Ballarat (with the BTV callsign) until aggregation in 1992.)		11 VHF; (10 VHF)		30 kW; (15 kW)	365 m; (365 m)	37°27′32″S 141°54′57″E	Mount Dundas

== See also ==
- Television broadcasting in Australia
- Regional television in Australia
