= RTQ =

- Regional Queensland; Australia
- Branding: WIN, Nine

Programming
- Network: WIN Television
- Affiliations: Nine

Ownership
- Owner: WIN Corporation Pty Ltd; (WIN Television QLD Pty Ltd)

History
- First air date: 7 September 1963
- Former affiliations: Independent (7 September 1963 – 31 December 1990); Network Ten (1990, 1 July 2016 – 30 June 2021); Nine Network (31 December 1990 – 30 June 2016)
- Call sign meaning: Rockhampton Television Queensland

Technical information
- Licensing authority: Australian Communications and Media Authority

Links
- Public licence information: Profile
- Website: www.wintv.com.au
- For technical information, see § Main transmitters.

RTQ is an Australian television station broadcasting in regional Queensland in Australia. The network was owned by Star Television, before being purchased by the WIN Corporation on 5 October 1988.

== Network history ==
WIN Television Queensland started out as Darling Downs Television Limited in 1959, which was launched as a television network in 1962 as Queensland's first regional TV station, DDQ-10, broadcasting to the Darling Downs area for the first time. SDQ-4 for the Southern Downs soon launched in 1964, and DDQ-5 was next to air later (it would later change frequencies to 5A) for Toowoomba viewers.

Rockhampton station, RTQ-7, was launched by Rockhampton Television Ltd on 7 September 1963 to serve viewers in Rockhampton and its suburbs. Between 1968 and 1971, RTQ's viewing audience across Central Queensland considerably increased with the installation of transmitters at Cracow, Blackwater and Gladstone. RTQ-7 began colour transmissions on 1 March 1975. Prior to aggregation, RTQ-7 produced a considerable amount of local content with programs such as The Morning Show, Feminine Touch, Claire's Corner, Wedmaier's Walkabout, Seven Days, Holiday Fun & Games, Racing Roundup and its local news service all being presented from the studio in North Rockhampton. The other programming aired by RTQ-7 was "cherry-picked" by station management from all three metropolitan networks.

Until the 1980s, Darling Downs TV sometimes supported the Nine Network and QTQ-9, its Brisbane station, by broadcasting its newscasts on relay. However, the station switched sympathies to Network Ten and TVQ-0 in the early part of the decade, supporting its programs and broadcasting TVQ-0's Eyewitness News on relay. It was part of the Great Eastland Television network in 1975–1987, together with NRN NRTV 11-8 Television and NEN 9-8 Television (both in New South Wales) as GET 10-4-5a. In 1976, Darling Downs TV became the first regional TV network in Australia to adopt electronic news gathering for its news service within a year after it became a colour station. This was the same case for RTQ during those years as after having been a Nine News broadcaster, switched news affiliations with the Seven Network and BTQ's local newscasts via microwave relay.

Due to its purchase of Ten Brisbane (TVQ-0) in 1987 and its move to Channel 0 the next year (as Vision TV) to give way to the new Brisbane Ten (TVQ-10), it suddenly became Queensland's strongest regional TV network, even after its TVQ selloff, bringing Ten programs and Eyewitness News (later Brisbane Ten News) to the Darling Downs and Southern Downs. DDQ-10 became DDQ-0 on 10 September 1988 and its network name became Vision TV. Reflecting this was a reformat of its newscasts and news studio to that of Ten's. RTQ-7 also by then began broadcasting Ten programs in Rockhampton, after its previous commitment to BTQ-7's programs, Seven National News and State Affair.

By 1989, DDQ/SDQ joined the aggregation race, becoming Star Television. RTQ joined the network in mid-1990 and thus merged it with the Darling Downs stations.

Star Television was then purchased by WIN Television, then as a Ten affiliate for the state as it had already been decided that TNQ/FNQ (QTV 7-10) would be the Nine affiliate.

However, prior to aggregation, a deal with Nine was reached with Star TV's owners WIN Television which aligned Star TV Queensland with WIN's existing affiliation with Nine in southern NSW. This decision effectively overturned Nine's prior arrangements with QTV, which struggled with complexity of the last minute decision, but eventually joined Network Ten as its affiliate in Nine's place. The shock exchange of affiliation came within a week before aggregation took effect.

On New Year's Eve 1990, it became WIN Television Queensland on the first day of statewide aggregation, with the network's Rockhampton facilities used to produce local editions of WIN News newscasts across some markets every day, including the Toowoomba edition.

New transmitting stations were also built in Townsville, Mt. Stuart, Cairns, Mackay and Maryborough in time for statewide broadcasts even before Star TV turned to the Nine Network as its affiliate, even as parts of the news service were done in Coffs Harbour in NSW, part of a failed plan to bring both Star TV and NRTV, the Ten partner for Northern NSW, together as one network for viewers in their respective areas.

In 1998, when WIN Television decided to introduce a Sunshine Coast edition of WIN News, the network decided to once again use the DDQ studio at the Toowoomba station to produce news bulletins. From then on, the studio was used by Toowoomba-based newsreaders to read bulletins for both Toowoomba and the Sunshine Coast, while the RTQ studio in Rockhampton continued to produce bulletins for the Rockhampton, Townsville and Cairns regions.

Those arrangements continued until WIN Television introduced additional bulletins for both the Wide Bay-Burnett and Mackay regions in 2010. The RTQ studio in Rockhampton was then used to produce bulletins for the Rockhampton, Mackay, Cairns and Sunshine Coast regions, while the DDQ studio in Toowoomba was used for the presentation of the local Toowoomba, Wide Bay-Burnett and Townsville bulletins.

In December 2011, RTQ's analogue signals in regional Queensland were turned off as part of the switchover to digital television.

In May 2012, WIN Television closed its news production studios in Rockhampton and once again ceased using the Toowoomba station for news production, making Rockhampton-based weather presenter Peter Byrne and Toowoomba sports presenter Pat O'Shea redundant. WIN Television centralised all news production to its new Sunshine Coast studio facilities.

After relocating the remaining staff to an office in the Rockhampton CBD, WIN Television abandoned the former RTQ site in North Rockhampton in late 2012, a site which was once WIN Television's administrative and technical headquarters for the network in Queensland. As the old building lays dormant, it has succumbed to vandals with a quarter of the building sustaining damage when a suspicious fire broke out at the site in June 2016.

In 2015, the local news service RTQ provided for the Mackay region was axed.

In 2016, WIN Television switched to Network Ten after strained affiliation relations with Nine which ended WIN and Nine's 27-year partnership and their 25-year partnership for regional Queensland. With RTQ returning to Ten affiliation after 25 years on 1 July 2016, the switch effectively reversed the 1990 decision as TNQ returned to being the Nine Network regional partner for regional viewers in Queensland.

Due to the affiliation switch, WIN Television's news service was required to be rescheduled from 7pm. where it previously aired following Nine News Queensland, to its more traditional timeslot of 6p.m. where it was sandwiched between Ten Eyewitness News and The Project.

in 2021, WIN Television switched back to the Nine Network, having signed a new agreement with the network. From 2021 onwards, RTQ alongside the other WIN stations in Queensland are now once more Nine Network affiliates.

== Programming ==
WIN Television broadcasts its programming from Nine including their regional signals. WIN also broadcasts news, current affairs and sport programs such as Today Extra, Nine News, A Current Affair, Nine's Wide World of Sports, The NRL Sunday Footy Show, Sports Sunday and Today throughout this region.

RTQ simulcasts the nightly and weekday afternoon Melbourne editions of Nine News from QTQ 9 in Brisbane, along with the national bulletins and current affairs programs from TCN 9 in Sydney and STW 9 in Perth.

== WIN News ==
WIN News produces regional news bulletins for five of the seven regional markets covered by RTQ – (Sunshine Coast & Maroochydore), (Rockhampton & Central Queensland), (Cairns & Far North Queensland), (Toowoomba) and (Townsville & North Queensland).

Reporters and camera crews are based in newsrooms throughout the regions of the Sunshine Coast, Rockhampton, Cairns, Wide Bay, Toowoomba and Townsville. All bulletins were produced from WIN's studios in Maroochydore, however production has moved to WIN's Wollongong headquarters in July 2017.

Between April 2009 and May 2015, the network also produced a local news service for Mackay and the Whitsundays.

In June 2019, The Network also axed the Wide Bay-Burnett Bulletin.

=== Main anchors ===
- Bruce Roberts

=== Sports presenters ===
- Melissa Russell

=== Weather presenter ===
- Sarah Cawte

== Main transmitters ==
Region served	City	Channels (analog/ digital)	First air date	ERP (analog/ digital)	HAAT (analog/ digital)^{1}	Transmitter coordinates	Transmitter location
Cairns	Cairns	39 (UHF)^{6} 12 (VHF)	31 December 1990	400 kW; 50 kW	1176 m 1190 m	17°15′51″S 145°51′14″E	Mount Bellenden Ker
Darling Downs^{2}	Toowoomba	0 (VHF)^{3 6} 46 (UHF)	13 July 1962	300 kW; 500 kW	485 m 520 m	26°53′28″S 151°36′18″E (analog); 26°53′27″S 151°36′21″E (digital)	Mount Mowbullan
Mackay	Mackay	39 (UHF)^{6} 35 (UHF)	31 December 1990	1300 kW; 360 kW	612 m 630 m	21°1′56″S 148°56′36″E	Mount Blackwood
Rockhampton	Rockhampton	7 (VHF)^{6} 12 (VHF)	7 September 1963	200 kW; 50 kW	523 m 523 m	23°43′48″S 150°32′9″E	Mount Hopeful
Southern Downs^{4 6}	Warwick	42 (UHF)^{5 6} 43 (UHF)	26 February 1966	600 kW; 500 kW	301 m 301 m	28°32′9″S 151°49′58″E	Passchendaele, Queensland
Townsville	Townsville	40 (UHF)^{6} 41 (UHF)	31 December 1990	200 kW; 200 kW	617 m 644 m	19°20′36″S 146°46′50″E	Mount Stuart
Wide Bay	Maryborough	39 (UHF)^{6} 10 (VHF)	31 December 1990	1000 kW; 60 kW	646 m 646 m	25°25′37″S 152°7′3″E	Mount Goonaneman

Notes:

- 1. HAAT estimated from https://www.itu.int/SRTM3/ using EHAAT.
- 2. The Darling Downs station was an independent station with the callsign DDQ from its 1962 sign-on until aggregation in 1990.
- 3. The Darling Downs station was on VHF channel 10 from its 1962 sign-on until 1988, swapping frequencies with TVQ Brisbane.
- 4. The Southern Downs station was a relay of DDQ Darling Downs/Toowoomba (with the callsign SDQ) from its 1966 sign-on until aggregation in 1990.
- 5. The Southern Downs station was on VHF channel 4 from its 1966 sign-on until 1991, moving to its current channel in order to accommodate FM radio.
- 6. Analogue transmissions ceased on 6 December 2011 as part of the national shutdown of analogue television.
