= 4ME =

Australian digital advertorial datacasting channel

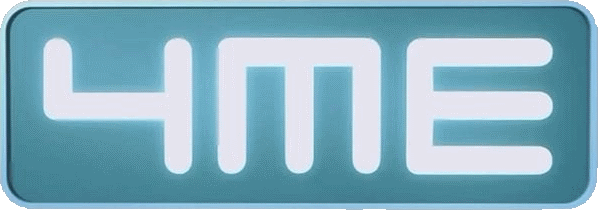
- Country: Australia
- Network: Prime7; Seven Network

Programming
- Language: English
- Picture format: 576i (SDTV) 16:9

Ownership
- Owner: Prime Media Group; Brand New Media; Seven West Media

History
- Launched: 18 September 2011
- Closed: 30 April 2016 (Prime7 markets); 19 May 2016 (Seven markets)
- Replaced by: ishop TV (Prime); 7food network then a HD simulcast of 7mate (Seven)
- Former names: Television 4 (2011); TV4ME (2011–2013)

Availability (at time of closure)

Terrestrial
- Freeview Seven owned (virtual): 74/64
- Freeview Prime affiliate (virtual): 64

4ME was a digital advertorial datacasting service that launched on 18 September 2011 by Prime Media Group and Brand New Media. It was formerly available to homes in the Prime7/GWN7 viewing area on channel 64, and the Seven-owned viewing area on channel 74 unless you were in an overlap market like the Sunshine Coast, in that case 4ME was both on channel 64 and 74. The channel was closed at midnight on 30 April 2016 in Prime regional areas after Brand New Media entered administration due to business troubles. 4ME later ceased broadcasting in Seven-owned areas on 19 May 2016.

As a datacasting channel, the content on the channel was regulated, it did consist of mostly information, and the scope for entertainment was limited. It showed mainly Australian made informational programs and infomercials, and as a datacasting service, it was prohibited from broadcasting programs that were wholly or substantially infotainment or lifestyle programs longer than 10 minutes.

== History ==
Television 4 logo, used from September to December 2011

When launched in regional areas on 18 September 2011, the channel was known as Television 4. On 7 November 2011, it was announced that the channel would expand into metropolitan areas and Regional Queensland via the Seven Network. Seven started test broadcasts of the channel on 1 December 2011. The channel changed to the name of TV4ME, when it was introduced to metropolitan areas in December 2011. It changed its name again, this time to 4ME, in 2013. A notable program on the channel was Psychic TV. The program returned in January 2016 after a bullying campaign in December 2015.

On 29 April 2016, Brand New Media, joint owner of 4ME alongside Prime Media Group, called in administrators after being hit with a series of "perfect storms" throughout its business interests. Prime announced that they will not renew the contract 4ME and LCN 64 on Prime-owned stations was re-purposed as an additional feed of Prime's other datacast channel ishop TV at midnight on 30 April 2016. 4ME went off the air on Seven-owned stations on 19 May 2016 and was replaced with a placeholder card notifying viewers that the channel was unavailable. The channel was removed from the Seven multiplex on 26 May 2016.

== See also ==
- List of digital television channels in Australia
