= ENT Ltd. =

ENT Ltd, standing for Examiner-Northern TV Ltd, is a private shell company owned by WIN Corporation. Formerly a publicly listed media company, from 1988 ENT had a majority share in Filmpac Holdings (formerly Filmways Australasian Distributors), a film and video distributor. Filmpac collapsed in 1990, and in 1994 ENT was taken over by WIN after major shareholder Edmund Rouse was involved in a bribery scandal.

== History ==
ENT Ltd was a publicly listed Australian media company based in Launceston, Tasmania run by major shareholder Edmund Rouse. ENT's 1988 annual report described the company's principal activities as television, newspapers, radio, commercial printing, motels, travel agencies, picture theatres, property development, and investment.

In 1994, a bribery scandal led to Rouse stepping down as managing director of ENT Ltd, which was taken over by WIN Corporation.

=== Filmpac ===
Filmways Australasian Distributors was originally formed by the founders of Dendy Cinemas, Mark Josem and Robert Ward, in 1971, to release movies to the Australian market. Mark Josem died in 1986 after a series of heart attacks from a surgery the previous year, and the company was renamed Filmpac Holdings soon afterwards.

Filmpac Holdings was a distributor of both films and videos. ENT acquired a 40 per cent stake in 1988 from its purchase of Victoria-based media company Associated Broadcasting Services.

Filmways/Filmpac also had a home video division on its own under the name Filmways Home Video, starting with a deal with Video Classics, then as a partnership with Video Tape Centre under the name 'Filmways VTC, with K-TEL Video distributing the titles from 1984 to 1985, and Vestron Video International distributing titles by Filmways Home Video/Filmpac from 1985 to 1988 before it became an independent video distributor for two years. Both Vestron and Filmways were Video Classics members before the K-TEL alliance.

Between 1986 and 1990, Filmpac released a total of 69 films theatrically, making it the country's largest independent mainstream theatrical distributor. The company collapsed in 1990, with its film library purchased by Village Roadshow, along with certain assets from another defunct distributor Seven Keys.

== Other entities formerly controlled by ENT ==
=== Print media ===
- The Examiner newspaper (Launceston)

=== Television stations ===
TasTV

- TVT-6 Hobart (now WIN Tasmania)
- TNT-9 Launceston (now Seven Tasmania)

The Six Network (later VIC Television)

- BTV-6 Ballarat (now WIN Victoria)
- GMV-6 Shepparton (now WIN Victoria)
- STV-8 Mildura (now WIN Mildura)

=== Radio stations ===
- 7EX Launceston (now Chilli 90.1fm)
- 7HT Hobart (now Triple M)
- 3SR Shepparton
- 3UL Warragul (now (now 531 3GG)
- 3UZ Melbourne (now RSN Racing & Sport)
- Four Californian radio stations
- Two Oregon radio stations

=== Other assets ===
- Holyman (shipping)
- Gunns (forestry)
- Village Cinemas Tasmania (cinemas, 50 per cent joint venture with Village Roadshow)
