= Mount Nardi =

Mountain in New South Wales, Australia

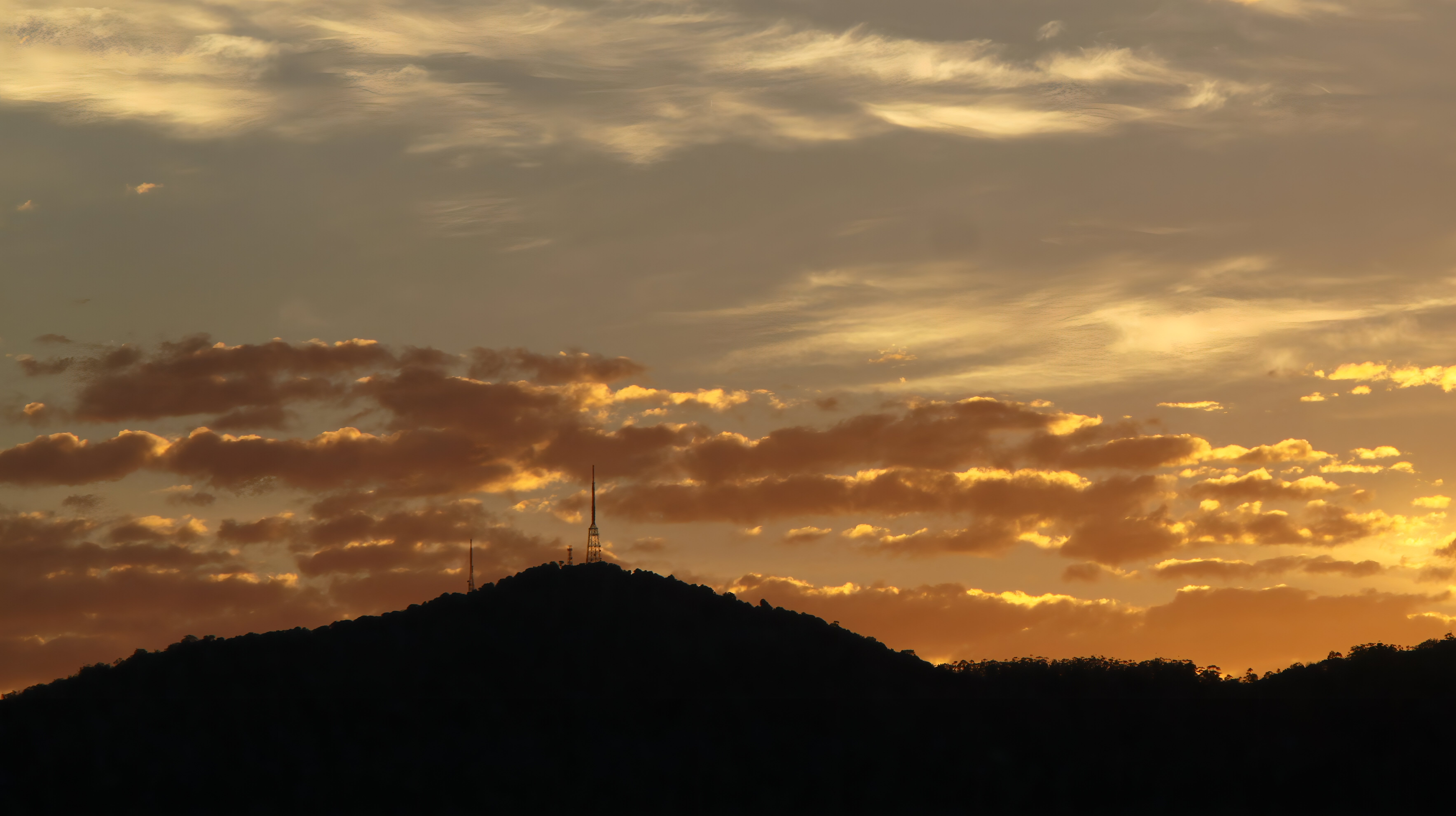
- Sunrise over the summit of Mount Nardi from the south

Highest point
- Elevation: 817 m (2,680 ft)
- Prominence: 236 m (774 ft)
- Coordinates: 28°32′06″S 153°17′13″E

Geography
- Location within New South Wales Location within Australia
- Location: Northern Rivers, New South Wales, Australia
- Range coordinates: 28°31′S 153°13′E
- Parent range: Nightcap Range, Great Dividing Range

Mount Nardi is a mountain in the Nightcap Range in the Northern Rivers region of New South Wales, Australia. The peak of Mount Nardi has an elevation of 817 metres (2,680 ft) above sea level, approximately 8.6 kilometres (5.3 mi) northeast of Nimbin.

== Geology ==
The mountain forms part of the Nightcap Range, a spur of the Great Dividing Range. This range forms the southern rim of the Mount Warning (Tweed) shield volcano. The range was formed over 23 million years ago as a result of successive lava flows, and today it consists of 3 rock types: Lismore Basalt, Nimbin Rhyolite and Blue Knob Basalt.

== History ==
Mount Nardi sits within the traditional lands of the indigenous peoples of the Bundjalung Nation. Traditionally the Bundjalung (particularly those that spoke the Widgjabal language) traversed it via walking trails, and maintained a few grassed clearings for camping and hunting within the rainforest. Europeans first settled in the Nightcap region for logging purposes in the 1842, due to an abundance of red cedar.

The area around Mount Nardi was a part of a region called the Big Scrub, a large area of lowland subtropical rainforest, which was intensively cleared for agricultural purposes during the 19th century. The historic Nightcap Track has its roots in a path used by postal workers to travel between Lismore and Murwillumbah.

Before the 1950s, the mountain was considered part of nearby Mount Matheson. After the two peaks were designated separate mountains, Mount Nardi was named for Terania Shire Councillor Angelo Nardi who served from 1956 to 1961.

In 1962, a communications tower, RTN-8 (now NRN-8), was constructed on the summit of Mount Nardi for analogue television (now broadcasts Triple Z FM radio following the discontinuation of analogue TV in 2012, as well as providing NBN wireless internet). A bitumen road, Newton Drive, was also constructed in 1962 between Nimbin and the summit of Mt Nardi to serve as an access road for the tower.

This was followed by the construction of 2 more masts; The ABRN-6 tower in 1964, which today provides digital TV and ABC North Coast radio for the Tweed and Gold Coast regions of New South Wales and Queensland respectively, and Telstra-1, constructed in 1975 by newly-founded Australian telecommunications company Telecom, (now Telstra). The original Telstra-1 tower was demolished and replaced by a new tower, Telstra-2, in the early 2010s, which provides mobile phone coverage, including 4G and 5G from internet provider Telstra, to the Lismore and Byron Bay area. Rival provider Vodafone uses transmitters on the neighbouring ABRN-6 tower, and Optus operates its own site in Tuntable Falls, near Nimbin. The enitre Mt Nardi site is operated by BAI Communications.

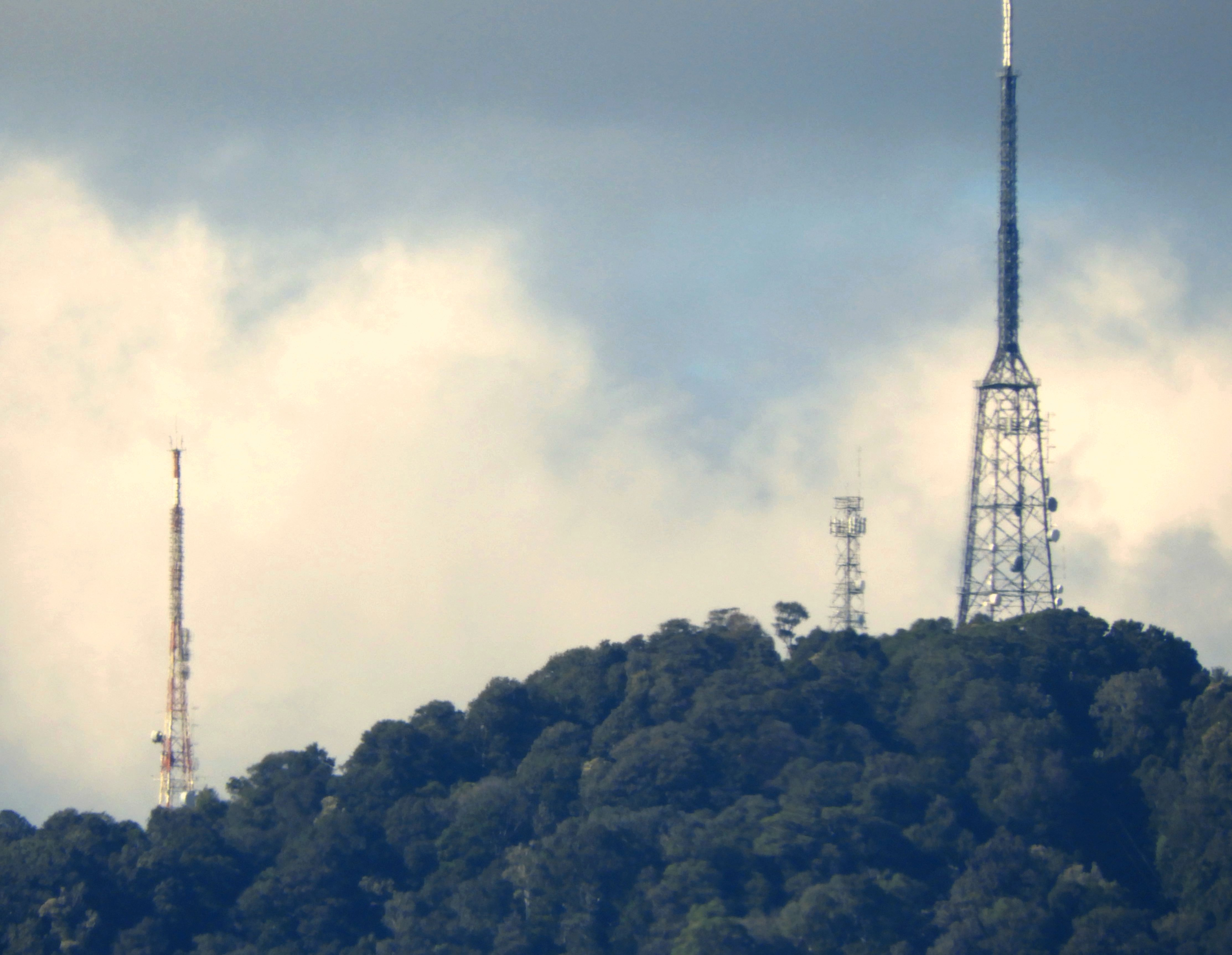
The three transmission towers on Mount Nardi (L to R: NRN-8, Telstra-2, ABRN-6)

The ABRN-6 tower, built in 1964 by the Australian Broadcasting Corporation, initially broadcast on the Brisbane network, but switched to the Sydney network in December 1967. The ABRN-6 tower began broadcasting digital channels in the early 2000s. Digital channels available from the ABRN-6 tower include ABC, Channel 7, Channel 9 and Channel 10.

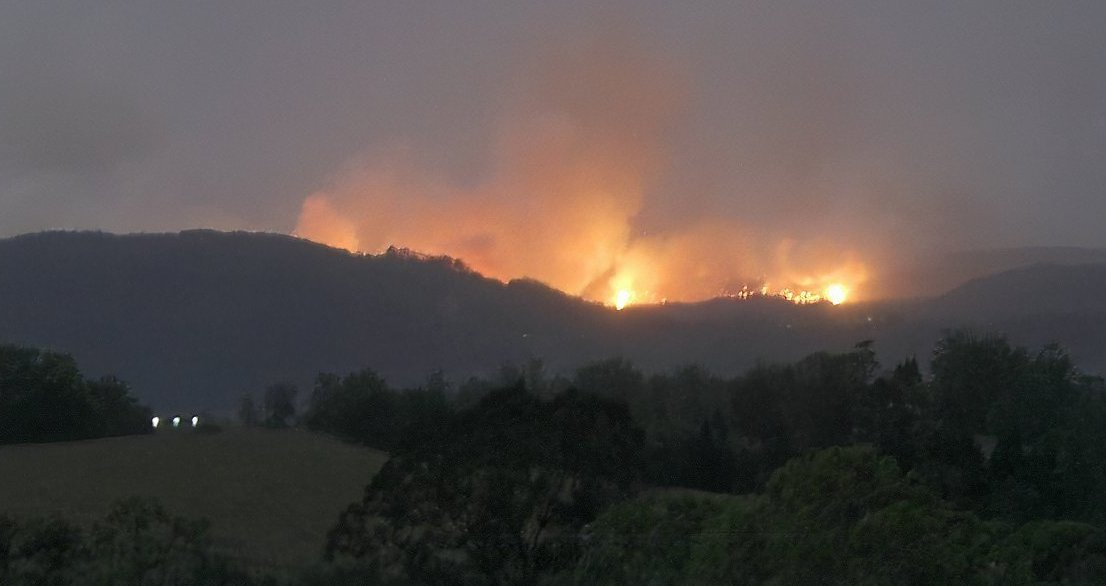
Bushfire at Mount Nardi, 8 November 2019

The mountain was devastated by bushfires in early November 2019, part of the catastrophic Black Summer fires, which destroyed the habitats of many native plant species.

== Facilities ==
Mt Nardi has a small picnic area with scenic views of the surrounding Nightcap National Park and Whian Whian State Conservation Area, with amenities including barbeques, toilets, picnic tables with shelters and information signs. Many walking trails begin at the summit, such as the Mt Matheson Loop and Pholi's walk, both part of the Nightcap Track.

== See also ==
- List of mountains in Australia § New South Wales
- Nightcap National Park
