= 2NZ =

- Inverell, New South Wales; Australia
- Frequency: 1188 KHz
- Branding: Home to Classic Gold

History
- First air date: 30 March 1936
- Former call signs: 2LV

Technical information
- Transmitter coordinates: 29.7742°S 151.2247°E

Links
- Website: www.2nz.com.au

2NZ is an Australian radio station serving the Inverell region. The station began broadcasting on 30 March 1936 under the original callsign of 2LV. In January 1937, after a request to increase broadcast power was approved, the callsign of the station was changed to 2NZ.

It was formerly owned by Country Television Services.
