= Country Television Services =

Australian media company

Country Television Services, formerly Country Broadcasting Services was an Australian media company that owned two television stations; CBN-8 Orange and CWN-6 Dubbo. It also owned radio stations, 2NZ Inverell, 2GZ Orange and 4RR Townsville.

In 1988, the two New South Wales television licences were sold to Ramcorp.
