= Prime Media Group =

Australian-based media corporation

Prime Media Group Limited
- Formerly: Ramcorp; Prime Television
- Traded as: ASX: PRT
- Industry: Media
- Founded: 1986; 40 years ago
- Founder: Paul Ramsay
- Defunct: 31 December 2021; 4 years ago
- Fate: Acquired by Seven West Media
- Headquarters: Canberra, Australia
- Key people: Ian Audsley (CEO)
- Products: Television
- Revenue: $179 million (2021)
- Operating income: $37 million (2021)
- Net income: $20 million (2021)
- Subsidiaries: Prime7; GWN7; Mildura Digital Television (50%); West Digital Television (50%) ishop TV (50%)
- Website: www.primemedia.com.au

Prime Media Group Limited (formerly Prime Television Limited) was an Australian-based media corporation that formerly owned regional television network Prime7 in eastern Australia and GWN7 in regional Western Australia. It also owned ishop TV, a datacasting channel, co-owned by Brand Developers and two joint ventures with the WIN Corporation, Mildura Digital Television, and West Digital Television, and also owned a network of radio stations in Queensland from 2005 until 2013, when they were sold to Grant Broadcasters.

Prime Media Group head office and Australian Securities Exchange registered office were located in Watson, Canberra. A secondary corporate office was located at Jones Bay Wharf, Pyrmont, Sydney (which was also the Seven Network's head office).

Prime7 had sales offices located in each regional sub-market. There were also regional sales offices at the Seven Network's metropolitan offices/studios in Sydney, Melbourne, Brisbane, Adelaide and Perth.

Prime7's national broadcast facility was located in Canberra, with playout facilities (as of 2021) shared with hybrid-funded broadcaster SBS Television at a facility operated by Telstra.

Prime Media Group Limited was renamed PRT Company Limited on 3 January 2022.

== History ==
=== Foundation of Prime ===
Prime Television began in 1970, when mineral explorer Altarama Minerals was incorporated and listed on the Australian Securities Exchange. Following its movement into the automotive industry, the business changed its name to Altarama in 1973.

Paul Ramsay gained control of Altarama in 1985, subsequently renaming it once again to Ramcorp. As part of a diversification into television, advertising, and healthcare, Ramcorp appointed Allan Hoy as founding media CEO who spearheaded the purchase of regional television stations RVN-2 Wagga Wagga, AMV-4 Albury, CWN-6 Dubbo, CBN-8 Orange, ECN-8 Taree and NEN-9 Tamworth in 1987. Soon after, the stations began to be known collectively as the Prime Television Network. In August 1991 Ramcorp was renamed Prime Television.

=== Aggregation and expansion ===
In the lead-up to television aggregation, Ramcorp signed a 10-year programming affiliation agreement with the Seven Network – the start of a close relationship between the two networks. In 1991 the business changed its name to Prime Television Limited, reflecting its new nature as a television broadcaster in regional Victoria and New South Wales.

Throughout the early 1990s, Ramcorp had incurred significant debts as a result of loans taken out throughout the 1980s in order to expand the company – Ramcorp's healthcare and media interests in Australia and the United States failed to turn a profit, resulting in falling share prices for the business. By 1993, Prime Television made a $7.4 million profit following accumulated losses of $47 million between 1989 and 1991, as well as a further $200 million expanding Prime Television's audience reach to 17 per cent, as part of aggregation.

Prime expanded into Western Australia when it purchased the Golden West Network from Seven Network owner Kerry Stokes in 1996. At the time, GWN was the monopoly commercial television network in the regional Western Australia license area, however WIN Television, Prime's competitor in parts of New South Wales and Victoria was granted a license by the Australian Broadcasting Authority a year later in 1997.

In the same year, Prime Television expanded internationally with the purchase of the Canal 9 television network in Argentina. Prime paid A$224 million for the network, later renamed Azul Televisión in 1999, before selling half of its share to local media group Torneos y Competencias for an undisclosed amount. Azul Televisión performed below expectations, largely due to a global economic crisis, and the Argentine network did not make a profit. Prime Television pulled out of Argentina in 2001, selling its stake for A$108 million.

The network expanded further into New Zealand, with Prime Television New Zealand on 30 August 1998. In 2002, Prime New Zealand entered into a joint venture with Australian company Publishing & Broadcasting Limited, owners of the Nine Network. Under the agreement, Prime Television was given access to Nine Network programs, expertise and money. In return, PBL was given the option to acquire 50% of Prime Television New Zealand in 2008. As a result, Prime Television New Zealand's ratings and profits increased significantly. Sky Television purchased Prime NZ for NZ$30 million in November 2005.

In late 2005, the company announced its expansion into regional Queensland radio with the acquisition of stations in Cairns, Townsville, Mackay, Rockhampton, and Gladstone from Macquarie Media Group (now Southern Cross Austereo). Prime chairman Paul Ramsay described the purchase as "a very good fit" which positioned its existing media for "future growth opportunities". On 1 August 2007, Prime purchased Zinc 96.1 and Hot 91.1 Sunshine Coast, from Rob Gamble, for $33.5 million. The company was renamed to Prime Media Group Ltd on 5 December 2007 in recognition of the company's expanded interests. But Prime's expansion into radio would ultimately be deemed a failure. In 2013, Prime's radio stations were sold to Grant Broadcasters for $50 million less than the original acquisition price.

For the 2007 Australian federal election, Prime's online division iPrime launched Federalelection.com.au, produced from Prime Television's Canberra headquarters in partnership with Roy Morgan.

The Seven Network purchased 14.9% of Prime Media Group and rumours emerge of an increased stake. In 2009, Lachlan Murdoch purchased an 8% stake. Murdoch was forced to resign as a director of Prime Media Group, in 2010, because of cross-ownership rules related to the company owning 91.1 Hot FM on the Sunshine Coast, Queensland, despite being a member of the Prime board at the time.

=== Acquisition by Seven West Media ===
Seven made two attempts to purchase Prime. In December 2019, its first acquisition attempt failed after Prime shareholders Bruce Gordon and Anthony Catalano voted down, despite majority of shareholders voting in favour of the transaction; on 1 November 2021, Seven made its second attempt for $121.9 million. On 23 December 2021, majority of Prime's shareholders voted in favour of the takeover which took effect on 31 December 2021.

== Assets ==
=== Television ===
- Prime7
- GWN7
- ishop TV
- Mildura Digital Television (50% share with WIN Corporation)
- West Digital Television (50% share with WIN Corporation)

=== iPrime ===
iPrime was an Australian internet portal produced by Prime Media Group. The portal was deployed across regions in which Prime7 and GWN7 currently broadcast television transmissions, which include the Australian Capital Territory, regional New South Wales, regional Victoria and regional Western Australia.
