= Peter Byrne (weather presenter) =

Australian television weather presenter

Peter Alexander Byrne is an Australian television presenter and meteorologist. Byrne was most notable for being a weather presenter for WIN Television from 1990 until 2012.

== Biography ==
Peter was born in Mackay, Queensland and worked with the Australian Bureau of Meteorology for over 37 years.

After graduating from a high school in Mackay, Byrne was appointed as a junior weather observer at the Bureau of Meteorology. Byrne then went on to complete meteorological training in Brisbane and Melbourne for 18 months before being posted to Brisbane. After his marriage to a Townsville school teacher, Byrne was posted to Madang on the north coast of Papua New Guinea which Byrne described as a "weather man's dream" as there was a smoking volcano to the north and snow-capped mountains to the south.

Byrne undertook more training in Melbourne and after receiving the relevant qualifications in 1971, he went from being a weather observer that collected and collated information to a fully-fledged forecaster. His new role as a forecaster required him to chart and analyse information to make forecasts. His role now also included briefing pilots - and the media. His job as a forecaster took him Byrne to Townsville where he worked for nine years. During his time in Townsville, Byrne was heavily involved with the Royal Australian Air Force and the United States Air Force as they researched the behaviour of cyclones.

In his time with the Bureau he worked in Papua New Guinea and the Solomon Islands and many regional centres, including Cairns, Mackay, Cloncurry, Brisbane, Townsville and some time in Mount Isa before finally settling in Yeppoon in 1986 where he made numerous appearances on RTQ7's local news, being regularly interviewed about storms and for other weather-related stories.

Byrne joined RTQ7 in Rockhampton in February 1990 as the local Rockhampton weather presenter, prior to the station becoming part of the WIN Television network. By his own admission, Byrne was reluctant to move into television. Byrne had already declined an offer from news director Phil Smith to fill in for the regular RTQ7 weather presenter while they were on holidays. Some months later, new news director Alastair Frew extended another invitation to Byrne to join the station as their permanent weather presenter. After some consideration, Byrne accepted the offer.

However, Byrne had to seek the approval from Rex Falls, the regional director of the Bureau of Meteorology. Falls agreed to Byrne's new television commitments but it meant Byrne had to begin work at the Bureau of Meteorology earlier. This meant Byrne now had to leave his Yeppoon home at 2:45am each morning to start his shift in Rockhampton, and then drive back to Yeppoon after work for some sleep before driving back up to the WIN Television studio in North Rockhampton to begin recording his weather reports for the various news bulletins.

While he was employed at WIN Television, his role expanded to being the weather presenter on all the local editions of WIN News weeknightly, delivering individual weather reports for the Cairns, Townsville, Mackay, Rockhampton, Wide Bay–Burnett, Toowoomba and Sunshine Coast regions of Queensland. Additionally, Byrne also began presenting a statewide weather report upon the introduction of the Queensland edition of WIN Late News in 2001.

Byrne retired from his post at the Rockhampton office of the Bureau of Meteorology in 2001, but continued his work as a weather presenter with WIN Television in Rockhampton.

In 2012, Byrne made news when he used his weather reports to criticise reports made by metropolitan television stations, particularly on the breakfast programs such as Sunrise and Today relating to weather conditions in Queensland. In one weather report, Byrne said: The southern media are at it again... more unprofessional claptrap on what they portray as breakfast television. Imagine the repercussions if, on national television, I forecast 200km/h winds for Sydney or Melbourne! Hooley, Dooley! Queensland deserves and demands better. Give us the factual information, not the nonsensical gobbledygook transmitted out of Sydney. Give us a break! It just makes me so angry. How do they get away with it?!

Following his on-air outburst, there were reports that Byrne had clashed his WIN Television management which led him to storm out of the television station, which may have led to his absence on WIN News for the succeeding two nights following the incident. Byrne later said that while management still weren't happy with him, the issue had been reconciled and his colleagues had even handed him a "Storm in a Teacup" award after the incident, which consisted of a cut-out of a Melbourne Storm player in an actual teacup. Byrne also alluded to not having a job at WIN for much longer, which was likely referring to the imminent closure of the WIN Television studio facilities in Rockhampton.

In May 2012, WIN Television closed their Rockhampton studio facilities as they centralised the production of news bulletins to a new studio complex on the Sunshine Coast. While the news anchor and sports presenter relocated to commence work at WIN's new production facilities at Maroochydore, Byrne decided to stay in the local area effectively ending his relationship with 22-year relationship with WIN Television. On his final night on 4 May 2012, WIN Television aired a special package featuring tributes from former colleagues that had previously worked at WIN Television in Rockhampton such as Karl Stefanovic, Leila McKinnon and Davina Smith.

Soon after leaving WIN Television, Channel 7 approached Byrne to do some work for them without having to leave the local area.

Since late 2012, Byrne has presented a weekly retrospective segment called Rewind which airs on all local editions of Seven News across regional Queensland.
