= TVT (TV station) =

- Tasmania; Australia
- Channels: Digital: see table below
- Branding: Nine, WIN

Programming
- Language: English
- Network: WIN Television
- Affiliations: Nine (since 2021, also from 1994–2016)

Ownership
- Owner: WIN Corporation Pty Ltd; (WIN Television TAS Pty Ltd)

History
- First air date: 23 May 1960
- Former affiliations: Independent (23 May 1960 – 30 April 1994); Network 10 (1 July 2016 – 30 June 2021)
- Call sign meaning: Television Tasmania

Technical information
- Licensing authority: Australian Communications and Media Authority

Links
- Public licence information: Profile
- Website: www.wintv.com.au
- For technical information, see § Main Transmitters.

TVT is Tasmania's first television station, delivering its first official broadcast on 23 May 1960. The callsign stands for "TeleVision Tasmania". Unlike the commercial stations in Sydney, Brisbane, Melbourne, Adelaide, and later Perth, TVT held a monopoly in the Hobart market for many years (not unlike CTC in Canberra and NTD in Darwin).

Initially it broadcast from the Mount Wellington transmitter on VHF channel 6, to all of Hobart. Its broadcast licence area covered all of southern Tasmania, these areas being reached by various repeaters and retransmitters.

It continued to broadcast as TVT-6 until 1982, where it was bought by ENT, owner of Launceston station TNT-9. Both stations began broadcasting under the unified on-air identity of TasTV by 1985, thus becoming for the first time a statewide network. ENT also owned Vic TV in regional Victoria.

In 1988, TNT-9 was sold to Tricom Corporation (later Southern Cross Broadcasting), leaving TVT-6 continuing to service the south as TasTV. And with the dawn of statewide aggregation rising in the early 1990s, TasTV began its preparation, this time as the Nine Network affiliate for the state on the very moment it would restart broadcasts to Northern Tasmania thanks to aggregation. TasTV aired most Nine Network programs, some are the programs from Seven Network and Network Ten. It adopted Nine's idents and campaigns and a new slogan, First in Tasmania, in 1993, and the news service was reconfigured to that of Nine's.

The biggest change to Tasmanian television came in 1994 when aggregation occurred. This allowed both TasTV (TVT-6) and Southern Cross (TNT-9) to broadcast across the entire state and for the first time, give Tasmanians a choice of commercial stations. TasTV, now once again broadcasting all over the state, officially confirmed itself as the Nine Network affiliate and Southern Cross held dual Seven and Ten affiliations.

In October of that year, WIN Corporation bought ENT in a forced takeover and thus TasTV became WIN Tasmania, the state division of the growing regional network. It still uses the callsign TVT-6 for its Hobart and southern Tasmania licence.

In 2002, WIN Corporation and Southern Cross Broadcasting formed a joint venture company to broadcast a third commercial station, Tasmanian Digital Television, in a digital-only format as a Ten affiliate.

On 1 July 2016, as part of a wide national re-alignment of regional television, TVT swapped affiliations with TDT switching from Nine Network to Network Ten, but TVT rebroadcast a feed of ATV-10 from Melbourne with local ads.

On 1 July 2021, as the reverse of the 2016 swap, TVT once again swapped affiliations with TDT switching from Network 10 back to the Nine Network, but TVT rebroadcasts a feed of GTV-9 from Melbourne with local ads.

On 16 June 2022, WIN Television Tasmania (TVT) converted 9Gem and 9Go! to MPEG-4 SD channels, as a test for the rest of the areas covered by WIN.

The station is affiliated with the metropolitan Nine Network and also broadcasts most of Nine's sub-channels (9Gem, 9Go! and 9Life) except it doesn’t broadcast 9Rush.

== Programming ==
WIN Television Tasmania (TVT) broadcasts its programming from the Nine Network, including their regional signals of Channel Nine, 9Gem, 9Go!, 9Life and 9Rush. WIN also broadcasts news, current affairs and sport programs such as Today Extra, Nine News, A Current Affair, Nine's Wide World of Sports and Today all over Tasmania.

== WIN News Tasmania ==
WIN News has produced a half-hour weeknight local news bulletin five days a week from its studios in Wollongong since 2018. Prior to 2018, the bulletin was produced from the WIN studios in Hobart. Briefly, the bulletin became an hour-long state-based bulletin in an attempt to rival Seven affiliate Southern Cross’ nightly news bulletin, but was reverted to a half-hour years later.

Weekend bulletins were previously discontinued on Sunday 26 June 2011 and were replaced by simulcasts of the Melbourne edition of Nine News until they were reintroduced on Saturday 14 July 2012.

As part of the Ten affiliation swap deal, WIN News Tasmania moved to 6.00pm weeknights & 5.30pm on weekends (originally 5.30pm weekdays and weeknights, replacing Ten's Melbourne bulletin), launching a new look.

Hobart produced bulletins were discontinued in August 2018, following the WIN Networks decision to centralise news output to its Wollongong studios. WIN News final Hobart based bulletin was presented by Lucy Breaden and Brent Costello on 17 August 2018.

At Nine Networks 2023 Upfronts, the network announced it would produce a Tasmanian edition of Nine News from studios in Hobart to be broadcast on WIN, however as of 23 April 2026, plans have not eventuated.

TVT simulcasts Nine News Melbourne from GTV-9 in Melbourne

- Nine News Melbourne (Sunday to Saturday 6:00pm – 7:00pm) (from GTV-9)

=== Reporters ===
- Brent Costelloe

== Main Transmitters ==
Region served	City	Channel (analog/ digital)	First air date	ERP (analog/ digital)	HAAT (analog/ digital)^{1}	Transmitter Coordinates	Transmitter Location
Hobart	Hobart	6 (VHF)^{2} 7 (VHF)	23 May 1960	200 kW; 50 kW	1004 m 1004 m	42°53′42″S 147°14′10″E	Mount Wellington
North Eastern Tasmania	Launceston	35 (UHF)^{2} 42 (UHF)	30 April 1994	2000 kW; 600 kW	844 m 839 m	41°23′30″S 147°25′36″E (analog); 41°23′27″S 147°25′28″E (digital)	Mount Barrow

Notes:

- 1. HAAT estimated from http://www.itu.int/SRTM3/ using EHAAT.
- 2. Analogue transmission ceased as of 9 April 2013 as part of the national conversion to digital-only television
