= Triple M Central West =

- Orange, New South Wales, Australia; Australia
- Frequency: 105.1 MHz FM

Ownership
- Owner: Southern Cross Austereo
- Sister stations: hit105.9 Central West

History
- First air date: 1935
- Former call signs: 2GZ (1935–1999)

Technical information
- Transmitter coordinates: 33°17′01″S 149°06′00″E

Links
- Website: triplem.com.au/centralwest

Triple M Central West (call sign: 2OAG) is an Australian radio station, licensed to Orange, New South Wales. It is owned and operated by Southern Cross Austereo, and transmits on 105.1 MHz on the FM band. It originally broadcast on 990 kHz, before switching to 1089 kHz, before switching to the FM band. The former Am frequency of 1089 was turned into a relay station of an automated Sydney station, and later purchased by Broadcast Operations Group.

The station was founded in the mid-1930s. It was opened by the Postmaster General, Sen. McLachlan on the evening of 31 October 1935. The ceremony was actually performed in Sale, Victoria, as the Senator was performing a similar duty opening the new ABC regional station 3GI. The speech was relayed by landline to Orange. Contrary to popular thought, 2GZ was not the first to open west of the Blue Mountains as previously thought, that honour goes to 2MK at Bathurst, it opened in 1925 and closed in 1930/31. The original licensee of 2GZ was Country Broadcasting Services (later Country Television Services), who also launched CBN-8 Orange and CWN-6 Dubbo in the 1960s.

The station converted to the FM band on October 8, 1999.

Today the station broadcasts an Adult Contemporary/Classic Hits format, with a wide playlist of songs from the 1960s through to the 1990s and today, with a target demographic of 35–55 years.

It was the Central West outlet for the John Laws morning show, as well as running its own breakfast program, similar to most of the former DMG-owned stations. It then ran the Charles Wooley morning show, sending Laws to 2EL. Ironically, 2GZ was once one of the regional stations that Laws worked at before becoming a national radio icon. In December, Macquarie severed ties with Charles Wooley, and was one of a handful of regional stations to take up a feed of Ray Hadley's 2GB radio show, commencing 27 January.

In late 2016, Southern Cross Austereo took over and rebranded the station, along with quite a few regional stations Triple M Central West.
