= Great Eastland Television =

- Country: Australia
- Broadcast area: Northern New South Wales and South East Queensland
- Network: Independent
- Affiliates: Northern Rivers Television; 11-8 Television; Television 10-4-5A

Programming
- Language(s): English

Ownership
- Owner: Darling Downs Television Limited, Television New England Limited, Northern Rivers Television Limited

History
- Launched: 19 October 1975
- Closed: 1987
- Replaced by: Vision TV; NRTV; Prime Television

Availability

Terrestrial
- Darling and Southern Downs, Queensland: DDQ 10/5a Toowoomba, SDQ-4 Warwick and relays
- Mid and Far North Coast, New South Wales: NRN-11 Coffs Harbour, RTN-8 Lismore, and relays
- New England, North West and Manning River, New South Wales: NEN-9 Tamworth, ECN-8 Taree and relays

Great Eastland Television (GET) was a network of affiliated country television stations servicing northern New South Wales and South East Queensland from 1975 to 1987. The system combined three pairs of television stations in the Darling and Southern Downs regions of Queensland and the New England, Manning River and North Coast regions of northern New South Wales.

The stations involved in the network were:

- DDQ-10 and DDQ-5a Toowoomba/Darling Downs
- SDQ-4 Southern Downs
- NRN-11 Coffs Harbour
- RTN-8 Lismore
- NEN-9 Tamworth
- ECN-8 Taree

All the stations were independently owned of each other, but shared common programming and branding. The stations were branded as GET (channel number), for example, DDQ/SDQ was known as GET 10-4-5a. The network was formed as a response to rising programming costs incurred by regional stations in the 1970s.

The network was dismantled in the mid to late 1980s, although by the close of the decade, NRN/RTN and DDQ/SDQ were co-owned and at one point, DDQ's operations were to be largely based out of Coffs Harbour, before becoming part of the RTQ licence in the regional Queensland market.

Today, they are now affiliated with metropolitan networks as part of larger ownership groups. DDQ/SDQ and NRN/RTN are now relays of WIN Television's Queensland and Northern New South Wales licences respectively (DDQ and SDQ have since merged into RTQ), and NEN and ECN are now the Seven Network station in the same market. The RTN and ECN call-signs were replaced with those of NRN and NEN respectively.

== See also ==
- Regional television in Australia
