= NRN =

- Northern New South Wales & Gold Coast; Australia
- Channels: Digital: see table below
- Branding: 10

Programming
- Language: English
- Affiliations: 10

Ownership
- Owner: Paramount Networks UK & Australia (Ten Network Holdings); (Northern Rivers Television Pty Ltd)

History
- First air date: 23 January 1965
- Former channel numbers: Analogue: 10 (1965), 11 (1965–2012); Other former channel numbers: see table below
- Former affiliations: Independent (1965–1975; 1987–1991); Great Eastland Television (1975–1987)
- Call sign meaning: Northern Rivers New South Wales

Technical information
- Licensing authority: Australian Communications & Media Authority
- ERP: see table below
- HAAT: see table below
- Transmitter coordinates: see table below

Links
- Website: www.10.com.au

NRN is a television station originating in Coffs Harbour, Australia. The station is owned by Network 10 and relays the network's content into the northern New South Wales broadcast market. The station was formally a partnership between NRN-11 Coffs Harbour (launched 23 January 1965) and RTN-8 Lismore (launched 12 May 1962).

== History ==
=== Origins ===
NRN11 Coffs Harbour had merged with ECN8 Taree to form Northern Rivers Television, but later demerged in 1969. Around 1971, RTN8 Lismore and NRN11 merged, also forming Northern Rivers Television (NRTV), but was known on-air originally as 11–8 Television. The merged stations served the Mid North Coast and Northern Rivers areas of Northern New South Wales. During the mid-1970s, the station was concurrently known as Great Eastland Television, when the partnership shared programming and advertising with NEN-9 Tamworth and DDQ-10 Toowoomba/SDQ-4 Warwick, but they soon reverted to the NRTV brand.

In 1983, NRTV was relayed into the Gold Coast after a lobbying campaign from residents, although they could also watch the metropolitan commercial TV stations from Brisbane. NRTV's Gold Coast studios and offices were constructed in Ashmore on Southport Nerang Road. The Gold Coast facilities did not contain a newsroom, but relayed local news from the Coffs Harbour studios. News crews from Lismore travelled to the Gold Coast for stories of importance.

NRTV produced a considerable amount of local programming (approximately five each week), including regional news, three hours of live women's variety "Round About", 5 half-hours of live children's variety "Get Set", "Birthdays", and "Razzamataz, with on-air presenter Rhonda Logan" weekly, holiday specials "Summerthon", and a half-hour daily exercise program "Jazzacize". Live sports specials included the annual Grafton Cup Racing Carnival and the Grafton to Inverell Cycling Classic.

Live programs mainly originated from the Coffs Harbour Studios with programs being recorded at both the networks other studios located at Lismore and Gold Coast.

Some of the memorable names from that era were:

- Ron Lawrence – Ron died in 2008. He was the driving force behind the network's local production. He began his career as booth announcer at the Lismore Radio and TV Studios of Northern Star Holdings (RTN 8) and (Radio 2LM) after graduating from Jim Illife's AIR-TV College in Brisbane. He moved to Coffs Harbour TV studios in the early 70s after the merge between NRN11 and RTN 8 and became the station announcer–news reader. Later in his career, he became Program Manager then later Station Manager and finally General Manager before retiring in the 1990s.
- Wayne Magee, also a diploma graduate from the Brisbane College AIR-TV (formally with Radio 4GY Gympie (1971), BCV TV Victoria 1971–1975) and National Nine News Adelaide 1975–1976) started with the NRN–RTN Network in 1976 (1976–88). During his time with the network he hosted the children's program Get Set, network specials and telethon, was booth announcer and read local Monday to Friday TV news. He was appointed as the network's Executive Producer of Programs overseeing local production conducted in the three studios located at Coffs Harbour, Goonellabah, and in the 4GG Radio complex on the Gold Coast. Wayne eventually moved into management before leaving the network to become a minister or religion. He was later elected to the position of National President of the Pentecostal Christian Denomination - The Church of the Foursquare Gospel (Australia), served on the Foursquare Eastern Council of Foursquare Churches, Chaired the South Pacific FMI Regional Council and was a member of the Foursquare Missions International Global Council board based in Los Angeles.
- Chris Wordsworth who hailed from Townsville QLD and who had worked previously in radio. Chris hosted the children's show for a period and read main bulletin news Monday to Friday. He later joined Channel Seven Sydney as late edition news reader – journalist, was briefly a Chief of Staff for a QLD Politician and later assumed roles of Queensland news director with ABC and WIN Network.
- Greg Hughes who succeeded Wordsworth as newsreader and station announcer. He formally had worked for the Mike Walsh-owned Penrith radio station. In the early 1990s, Greg moved to Canberra to join the 2CC Breakfast Club, a team that later moved to sister station Mix 106.3. Greg also presented the weather on Ten Capital in Canberra for several years from the mid-1990s to 2001. He left broadcasting to work for the Army PR Dept.
- Rhonda Logan was the on-air presenter of 'Birthdays' and children's television show 'Razzamataz' and presented weather forecasts during the nightly NRTV News for three years. Rhonda simultaneously worked in commercial and community radio: (2CS) (2CHY-FM) and was a weekly columnist for newspapers,'Harbour Views', 'Coffs Harbour Advocate'.

In December 1987, NRN and sister station RTN were sold by Northern Star for $75 million to Darling Downs Television, a company controlled by David Haynes, which at the time owned the Ten station in Brisbane.

=== 1990s ===
1990 saw plans for NRTV to be merged with southern Queensland's Vision TV to form a larger regional network to respond to the growing aggregation of television into regional areas of the nation, but they were called off. On 31 December 1991, Northern New South Wales became the third area to be aggregated, and NRTV, via links to Network 10 (it was part of Northern Star Holdings), owned by Westfield Group chairman Frank Lowy), became its affiliate in the region. At one stage, NRTV was the subject of a bid from WIN Television. Nothing came of it, but had WIN gone through with the bid, it would have made NRTV the Nine Network affiliate (using the logos of its parent station in southern NSW and the campaigns of the Nine Network, attempting a replication of the affiliation steal during the 1990 aggregation of Regional Queensland television) and would have left NBN as Network 10's affiliate instead in the area.

NRTV was sold to Telecasters Australia in 1993, who also owned the Queensland affiliate of Network 10. In 1994, the station was renamed Ten Northern NSW, and its station identification was changed to that of Network 10. The station stopped producing regional news for Coffs Harbour, Lismore and Gold Coast in May 1995. They had previously produced a licence-wide bulletin, but that was axed due to poor ratings.

=== 2000s ===
Ten Northern NSW (NRN) and Telecasters itself were purchased by Southern Cross Broadcasting in 2001. The following year, NRN was rebranded to Southern Cross Ten. On 14 August 2005, the station and the whole Southern Cross Ten network, received a new star logo.

Southern Cross commenced broadcasting Ten secondary channel One HD via NRN on 2 July 2009 on LCN 50.

=== 2010s ===
Former NRN offices of Southern Cross Ten Newcastle from 2013

Southern Cross commenced running new Network Ten secondary channel Eleven via NRN on 11 January 2011 on LCN 55, replacing a simulcast of the main channel.

On 1 July 2016, Southern Cross Ten's unique branding began to phase out on NRN in favour of Ten's mainstream branding as Ten. This comes after Southern Cross switched all of its SC10 stations (except NRN) as Southern Cross Nine as part of its new program supply agreement with the Nine Network. Southern Cross announced on 13 September 2016 that 10 HD would be launched on LCN 52 on 21 September 2016. In addition, 10 Drama was reduced to a standard definition broadcast to accommodate 10 HD.

Southern Cross announced on 25 July 2016, that it would commence broadcasting a New Zealand-based datacast shopping channel, Yesshop via NRN on 1 August 2016 on LCN 54. However, Yesshop's owner (Yes Retail) made the decision to cease trading on 29 September 2016 citing lack of funds to pay wages and the company's current losses of approximately 20 million dollars. Employees were terminated the same day, and the channels were removed on Freeview later that day.

In late January 2017, it was announced that Southern Cross had entered into negotiations with WIN Corporation, owners of regional Ten-affiliate WIN Television, over the sale of NRN in exchange for WIN's Wollongong radio station i98FM. This deal would have expanded WIN's television coverage across all regional markets in the eastern states and granted Southern Cross radio coverage in Wollongong. Southern Cross later withdrew from negotiations on 20 February 2017 with no explanation given. However, WIN and Southern Cross later finalised an agreement where they would sell NRN to WIN for a total of $55 million, with the sale taking effect on 31 May 2017. NRN was maintained as Ten Northern NSW until playout and transmission were transferred to WIN's MediaHub facility in Ingleburn on 1 September 2017, when the station adopted the WIN branding. The LCNs were also reshuffled for NRN to align with WIN's other stations, but as Nine-owned NBN Television holds the 8-numbered digital channels in northern NSW, NRN's digital channels remain on the 5-numbered digital channels.

In September 2018, NRN launched a new free-to-air channel, Sky News on WIN (now News24 Regional) into the Northern NSW and Gold Coast areas.

In October 2018, WIN rebranded its versions of 10's multi-channels, One and Eleven, into WIN Boss (later changed to WIN Bold in December) and WIN Peach. WIN also updated its logo, launching at the same time as the launch of Network 10's new logo.

=== 2020s ===
On 23 June 2021, WIN announced that it renewed its programme and supply agreement with Paramount Global, the owner of Network Ten since 2020, for NRN. However, as WIN's main station's channels in other markets were rebranded from 1 July under a new PSA with the Nine Network, the Northern NSW station also dropped WIN's own branding outside its local news content, and carried the Network 10 branding seen in metropolitan markets.

On 13 February 2025, Network 10 announced they would be acquiring NRN from WIN Television. This followed Network 10's announcement that they would also be acquiring Southern Cross Austereo's 10-affiliated stations. The sale was completed on 1 May 2025. Playout and transmission continue to come from WIN's MediaHub facility in Ingleburn as of May 2026.

== Programming ==
10 Northern NSW (formerly WIN Television Northern NSW) broadcasts its programming from Network 10, includes their regional signals of 10, 10 Drama, 10 Comedy, News24 Regional and Gold. NRN rebroadcasts the 10 Sydney feed supplemented with local advertising for Northern NSW. NRN also rebroadcasts the 10 Brisbane feed supplemented with local advertising for the Gold Coast.

Unlike other 10 stations, as of 2026, NRN does not broadcast Nickelodeon Australia (previously 10 Shake).

== News ==
From February 2004 until August 2017, Southern Cross produced short local news updates which are broadcast throughout the day. These bulletins were branded as Southern Cross Ten News, Southern Cross News, Ten Local News Updates from 1 July 2016. The updates were produced from Southern Cross' Canberra studios and made use of news content from local radio stations owned by Southern Cross Austereo in each market. Local sport and weather reports also aired on an sporadic basis. Short updates also aired throughout the day and evening alongside updates from 10 News. The bulletins were researched, produced and presented by a single journalist.

Though the purchase of NRN by WIN was finalised on 31 May 2017, playout and transmission remained under Southern Cross' control until 1 September, when WIN formally assumed control over the station. During this interim period, Southern Cross continued to produce local news updates for NRN until 31 August. From 1 September 2017, WIN News took over the production of short local updates for NRN, which may run from 30 seconds to two minutes each.

NRN also aired WIN's All Australian News, a compilation news bulletin featuring news reports from WIN's newsrooms across regional Australia, despite the fact that no local stories from Northern NSW and Gold Coast were aired on this bulletin. The programme ended its airing on 30 June 2021, after WIN made adjustments to its news output following the return of Nine Network's programmes to WIN-owned stations outside Northern NSW the following day.

Following 10's acquisition of NRN in May 2025, the final updates branded as WIN News aired on 27 June 2025, with updates 30 June onwards branded as 10 News local update and now fixed in 2-minute editions throughout the day. WIN currently continue to produce the updates on behalf on 10 as of January 2026.

== Main transmitters ==
Region served	City	Channels (Analog/ Digital)	First air date	ERP (Analog/ Digital)	HAAT (Analog/ Digital)^{1}	Transmitter Coordinates	Transmitter Location
Grafton/Kempsey	Coffs Harbour	11 (VHF)^{3 4} 38 (UHF)	23 January 1965	250 kW; 250 kW	706 m 730 m	30°19′2″S 152°51′35″E	Mount Moombil
Manning River	Taree	65 (UHF)^{3} 11 (VHF)	31 December 1991	600 kW; 80 kW	633 m 633 m	31°42′7″S 152°40′43″E	Middle Brother
Hunter and Central Coast	Newcastle	57 (UHF)^{3} 39 (UHF)	31 December 1991	1200 kW; 250 kW	439 m 439 m	32°53′31″S 151°32′18″E	Mount Sugarloaf
Northern Rivers and Gold Coast	Lismore	8 (VHF)^{3} 32 (UHF)	12 May 1962	200 kW; 170 kW	612 m 648 m	28°32′33″S 153°17′25″E (analog); 28°32′44″S 153°17′15″E (digital)	Mount Nardi
Upper Namoi	Tamworth	34 (UHF)^{3} 32 (UHF)	31 December 1991	600 kW; 150 kW	844 m 874 m	30°17′5″S 150°10′2″E	Mount Dowe

- 1. HAAT estimated from http://www.itu.int/SRTM3/ using EHAAT.
- 2. The Richmond and Tweed station was an independent station with the callsign RTN from its 1962 sign-on until aggregation in 1991.
- 3. Analogue services ceased transmission as of 27 November 2012 as part of national conversion to digital-only television
- 4. NRN was originally licensed to broadcast on VHF 10 but in August 1965 received approval to change to 11 following reports that the Channel 10 signal was prone to interference

== See also ==
- Regional television in Australia
- Network 10
