= NEN (TV station) =

- Northern New South Wales & Gold Coast; Australia
- Channels: Digital: see table below
- Branding: Seven

Programming
- Language: English
- Network: Seven

Ownership
- Owner: Seven Media Group; (Prime Television (Northern) Pty Ltd)

History
- First air date: 10 April 1965
- Former call signs: ECN (Taree, Northern Rivers) (1966–1985)
- Former affiliations: Independent (1965–1975, 1987–1991); Great Eastland Television (1975–1987)
- Call sign meaning: New England, New South Wales

Technical information
- Licensing authority: Australian Communications and Media Authority
- ERP: see table below
- HAAT: see table below
- Transmitter coordinates: see table below

Links
- Public licence information: Profile
- Website: 7regional.com.au

NEN is an Australian television station licensed to, and serving northern New South Wales.

== History ==
NEN9 Tamworth/Upper Namoi commenced transmissions on 10 April 1965, with a relay in Armidale (NEN1, later NEN10) on 15 July 1966. ECN8 Taree/Manning River began on 27 May 1966.

By the mid-1980s, prior to aggregation, the station was broadcasting to Tamworth on VHF 10, VHF9 from Mt Dowe (Kaputar) and VHF8 from Middle Brother Mountain. They had translators at Armidale VHF10, Ashford VHF10, Glen Innes VHF3, Gloucester VHF11, Inverell VHF10, Quirindi VHF10, Tamworth VHF0, Walcha VHF1, Laurieton UHF47, Lightning Ridge UHF69.

During 1968–69, ECN8 who at the time were facing financial difficulties approached NBN3 Newcastle to take the station over but the proposal was rejected by the Australian Broadcasting Control Board. An approach was also made to NRN11 Coffs Harbour but an agreement could not be reached. Finally, ECN approached NEN with an agreement for ECN to carry a relay broadcast of NEN's programming from the end of March 1969. In November 1971, ECN merged with NEN, but continued to use the callsign ECN into the mid 1980s.

During the 1970s and early 1980s, NEN9 was a member of the Great Eastland Television partnership with NRN11 Coffs Harbour and DDQ/SDQ Toowoomba, Queensland, sharing programming and advertising. From 1984 until 1989 the station branded itself 9–8 Television, referencing the channel numbers of both their Tamworth and Taree broadcasts.

Prime Television purchased the station in 1989, rebranding the station Prime Television and aligning it with the Seven Network, similarly to CBN in southern New South Wales, whilst changing ECN's call sign to NEN. At the commencement of Northern NSW market Aggregation on 31 December 1991, Prime Television became the Northern NSW affiliate of the Seven Network, in competition with NRTV and NBN.

== Seven News ==
NEN produces and broadcasts two 30-minute Seven News bulletins for the North West and North Coast regional markets, both broadcast each weeknight at 6pm from Seven's Canberra headquarters and is co-presented by Madelaine Collignon and Nick Hose, with the North Coast edition broadcast live. Kirstie Fitzpatrick is the bulletin's weather presenter for both editions.

In the Newcastle and Central Coast regional markets, two-minute updates are presented by Pip Waller, with weather forecasts from Daniel Gibson. Both markets take Sydney's Seven News bulletin for the 6pm primetime news service.

Throughout the station's history, local news under various names for both regions were produced and broadcast from studios on Goonoo Goonoo Road in Tamworth. In the 2000s, Seven began closing most of its regional studios, citing upgrade costs. Tamworth, however, was not cut and was upgraded to digital equipment.

In January 2012, Seven announced local production for both Seven News bulletins would be moved to Seven's Canberra headquarters in April 2012. The plan was scrapped a month later.

However, in a report by ABC News on 22 January 2015, Seven announced it would be closing its Tamworth studios and transferring production to Canberra, and thus the last bulletin was produced in April 2015. The studios were converted to a car dealership sometime later, however, the last local news presenter, Fiona Ferguson, moved to the newly-established newsroom in Tamworth as the News Director for the North Coast bulletin. The transfer was completed on 27 April 2015.

== Main transmitters ==
Region served	City	Channels (Analog/ Digital)	First air date	ERP (Analog/ Digital)	HAAT (Analog/ Digital)^{1}	Transmitter Coordinates	Transmitter Location
Grafton/Kempsey	Coffs Harbour	31 (UHF)^{3} 35 (UHF)	31 December 1991	600 kW; 150 kW	725 m 730 m	30°19′2″S 152°51′35″E	Mount Moombil
Manning River^{2}	Taree	8 (VHF)^{3} 8 (VHF)	27 May 1966	320 kW; 80 kW	622 m 622 m	31°42′7″S 152°40′43″E	Middle Brother
Hunter and Central Coast	Newcastle	54 (UHF)^{3} 35 (UHF)	31 December 1991	1200 kW; 250 kW	439 m 439 m	32°53′31″S 151°32′18″E	Mount Sugarloaf
Northern Rivers and Gold Coast	Lismore	44 (UHF)^{3} 30 (UHF)	31 December 1991	600 kW; 200 kW	638 m 648 m	28°32′44″S 153°17′15″E	Mount Nardi
Upper Namoi	Tamworth	9 (VHF)^{3} 30 (UHF)	10 April 1965	250 kW; 150 kW	846 m 849 m	30°17′5″S 150°10′2″E	Mount Dowe

Notes:

1. HAAT estimated using EHAAT.
2. The Manning River station was an independent station with the callsign ECN from its 1966 sign-on until aggregation in 1991.
3. Analogue services ceased transmission as of 27 November 2012 as part of national conversion to digital-only television.

== See also ==
- Regional television in Australia
- Channel Seven
