= MDV (TV station) =

- Mildura, Victoria; Australia
- Channels: Digital: 10 (VHF)

Programming
- Language: English
- Affiliations: 10

Ownership
- Owner: Seven West Media (50%) WIN Corporation (50%); (Mildura Digital Television Pty Ltd)

History
- First air date: 1 January 2006
- Last air date: 30 June 2024 (18 years, 5 months and 29 days)
- Former channel numbers: Digital: 33 (UHF) (2006–2014)
- Former affiliations: 10 (2006–2016, 2021–2024); Nine (2016–2021)
- Call sign meaning: Mildura; Digital Television; Victoria

Technical information
- Licensing authority: Australian Communications & Media Authority
- ERP: 50 kW
- HAAT: 164 m
- Transmitter coordinates: 34°22′47″S 142°11′18″E

MDV was a television station in Mildura, Victoria, Australia. It was a joint venture between Seven West Media and WIN Corporation. It was a digital-only Network 10 affiliate for most of its history. It began broadcasting on 1 January 2006 and ceased transmission on 30 June 2024.

== History ==
MDV began broadcasting on 1 January 2006 as Ten Mildura, jointly owned by the incumbent broadcasters WIN Corporation and Prime Television. In January 2009, Macquarie Media Group tried to exchange a 50% stake in Mildura Digital Television from Prime Television, with its 50% stake in Darwin Digital Television, after losing a court challenge in late 2008 and advising the Australian Competition & Consumer Commission. However, Macquarie won its court appeal about selling Darwin Digital Television in exchange for MDV, on 12 January 2009.

On 1 July 2016, due to WIN Television becoming the Network 10 affiliate in the region, MDV switched its affiliation to the Nine Network and rebranded as Nine Mildura.

On 1 July 2021, due to WIN Television re-acquiring the Nine Network affiliate in the region, MDV switched back its affiliation to Network 10. On 31 December 2021, one of the joint-venture partners of MDV, Prime Media Group, was acquired by Seven West Media.

=== Closure ===
On 8 May 2024, it was announced that MDV would cease broadcasting on 30 June 2024 due to continued financial losses. WIN claimed in a FAQ posted to their website about the closure that the station had been unprofitable since it began, and that no job losses would result from the closure.

In early June, MDV began to air a commercial advising viewers of the closure, directing them to the same FAQ website.

On 30 June 2024, Mildura Digital Television went to air for the final time, ceasing operations just past midnight during a re-run of the day's broadcast of The Project, thus ending operations of MDT after 18 years. Following the final broadcast, the MDT license was handed back to the Australian Communications & Media Authority. The Network 10 affiliate was handed over to MDN. In some parts of Victoria, it was replaced by 10 Melbourne (via 10) and GLV/BCV.

=== Programming ===
Mildura Digital Television broadcast its programming from Channel 10.

== Availability ==
The station was a Network 10 affiliate for most of its history, and was jointly owned by Seven West Media and WIN Television. MDV was available on LCN 5 in the Mildura and Sunraysia area in standard-definition.

10's multichannels 10 HD (which is 10's main channel in high definition), as well as 10 Bold Drama and 10 Peach Comedy were available on LCN 50, LCN 51 and LCN 52 respectively. Before the 2021 affiliation swapback, Nine's multichannels 9Gem (in high definition) and 9Go! were available on LCN 50 and LCN 55 respectively. Before MDV's affiliation change on 1 July 2016, Ten's multichannels One and Eleven were available on LCN 50 (from 1 December 2009 for One) and LCN 55 (from 11 January 2011 for Eleven in Mildura) respectively.

WIN was responsible for handling playout and then transmitting this signal via satellite to transmission facilities in Mildura. WIN also handled the business administration and used to handle the national advertising sales for MDV, until 1 July 2022 when Southern Cross Austereo took over national sales. Local sales remained unchanged, with WIN's sale team continuing to support local businesses in Mildura.

The Mildura/Sunraysia region changed frequencies as part of a nationwide retune process on 26 August 2014, and the station moved from UHF 33 to VHF 10 as a result of the retune.

LCN	Service
5	10
50	10 HD
51	10 Bold Drama
52	10 Peach Comedy

== See also ==
- DTD (TV station)
- TDT (TV station)
- CDT (TV station)
- West Digital Television
