= CBN (Australian TV station) =

- Southern New South Wales and ACT; Australia
- Channels: Digital: see table below; Virtual: 6
- Branding: Seven

Programming
- Language: English
- Network: Seven

Ownership
- Owner: Seven Media Group; (Prime Television (Southern) Pty Ltd)

History
- First air date: 17 March 1962
- Former call signs: CWN (for its Central Western Slopes relay until aggregation in 1989); RVN (for the Riverina station until 1991)
- Former affiliations: Independent (1962–1989); Mid State Television (1973–1988)
- Call sign meaning: Country Broadcasting Services Limited, New South Wales

Technical information
- Licensing authority: Australian Communications & Media Authority
- ERP: see table below
- HAAT: see table below
- Transmitter coordinates: see table below

Links
- Website: 7regional.com.au 7plus.com.au

CBN is an Australian television station licensed to, and serving to the regions of central and southern New South Wales and the Australian Capital Territory.

== History ==
=== Origins ===
CBN-8 Orange commenced broadcasting on 17 March 1962, licensed to Country Broadcasting Services, owners of local radio station 2GZ. They soon changed their name to Country Television Services. CWN-6 Dubbo began transmission on 1 December 1965. Also owned by Country Television Services, they became the first station to completely relay another station's programming, although some station identification, such as test patterns, remained separate and program output for CWN originated from CBN's studios in Orange.

In 1968, the stations acquired access to the Postmaster-General's microwave link, allowing viewers to see national news programs and other major events live for the first time. By the early 1970s, the stations began to run into financial difficulties, and it was decided to enter into a joint programming agreement with MTN-9 of Griffith, resulting in the formation of the Television 6-8-9 network (later Mid State Television).

A 30-minute documentary on the 1978 National Rodeo Titles, called Goin' Down The Road, won the station the 'Outstanding Contribution by a Regional Station' Logie Award in 1979. Local programming in the 1980s included Focus, Rural Roundup, Early Shift, Weekend Report, Time to Live, Around The Schools, and coverage of local special events.

Local sports coverage, especially of tennis and rugby, formed a major part of the schedule in the late 1970s and early 1980s. From 1979, the station sponsored, and telecast the United Permanent Tennis Tournament, the only tournament of its kind in Australia.

With aggregation looming, CBN and CWN were purchased by health care magnate Paul Ramsay's Ramcorp Ltd in 1987, and merged with RVN/AMV to form Prime Television, in May 1988. Local programming and staff levels were reduced – morale at the time was reported to be at an all time low. Programming schedules began to resemble those of affiliation partner Seven, with new facilities built in Wollongong and Canberra in preparation for the expansion in coverage area.

=== Aggregation ===
When aggregation in southern New South Wales occurred in 1989, CBN and CWN were effectively merged into one station, CBN, branded on-air as Prime Television. The station then moved into the rest of the new license area, competing against WIN Television and 10 Capital. The introduction of the two new stations into Orange was delayed by technical problems, and did not start in the area until later in the year.

Upon aggregation, CBN/Prime began broadcasting 24 hours a day, but later dropped it in early 1990 due to "commercial realities", leaving WIN alone in the area.

In 1991, the Wagga Wagga and Orange licenses were merged into the one license, with RVN taking on the CBN callsign.

== Seven News ==
CBN produces and broadcasts two 30-minute Seven News bulletins (former names include Prime7 News and Prime News) bulletins for the Central West (Orange/Dubbo) and Wagga Wagga regional markets, each weeknight at 6 pm and is co-presented by Madelaine Collignon and Nick Hose, with Kirstie Fitzpatrick presenting the weather. As of April 2015, both bulletins are pre-recorded.

In the Wollongong and Canberra regional markets, short two-minute updates are presented by Pip Waller, with weather forecasts from Daniel Gibson.

For many years, these markets took Sydney's Seven News bulletin for the 6 pm primetime news hour, and formerly had dedicated news bulletins produced and headquartered in their respective areas.

Since August 2010, production of Seven News for the Orange and Wagga Wagga markets moved to Seven's Canberra headquarters. The two bulletins alternate between live transmission and being pre-recorded, prior to the addition of the North West and North Coast bulletins on 27 April 2015, due to the closure of the Tamworth broadcast studios on 24 April. On that same day, a renovated news studio was introduced for both bulletins. However, with the centralisation of all bulletins, the alternate live-recorded format for southern NSW was displaced to the live North West (and later, the live North Coast) bulletin.

CBN is the home network for the statewide 7News at 6:30 service launched for then Prime7 in 2014, and is broadcast from the Canberra studios. Presented by Daniel Gibson, it carries many of the national and international news items from the metropolitan news broadcasts, and only airs in areas served by the station and its Northern NSW sister NEN that receive a full local Seven News service.

From late May 2026, the control room for 7NEWS Tasmania will relocate from Launceston to CBN, with presentation of the bulletin to remain in Tasmania at TNT’s Hobart studios.

== Main Transmitters ==
Region served	City	Channels (Analog/ Digital)	First air date	ERP (Analog/ Digital)	HAAT (Analog/ Digital) (Note: HAAT estimated from http://www.itu.int/SRTM3/ using EHAAT.)	Transmitter Coordinates	Transmitter Location
Canberra	Canberra	34 (UHF) (Note: Analogue transmissions ceased as of 5 June 2012 as part of the national shutdown of analogue television); 12 (VHF)	31 March 1989	600 kW; 50 kW	362 m 345 m	35°16′32″S 149°5′52″E	Black Mountain
Central Tablelands	Orange	8 (VHF); 37 (UHF)	17 March 1962	200 kW; 570 kW	620 m 628 m	33°20′31″S 148°58′59″E	Mount Canobolas
Central Western Slopes (Note: The Central Western Slopes station was a relay of CBN with the callsign CWN from its 1965 sign-on until aggregation in 1989.)	Dubbo	6 (VHF); 41 (UHF)	1 December 1965	400 kW	638 m	31°20′32″S 149°1′22″E	Mount Cenn Cruaich
Illawarra & Regional Wollongong	Wollongong	65 (UHF); 38 (UHF)	31 March 1989	950 kW; 250 kW	619 m 600 m	34°37′23″S 150°41′39″E (analog); 34°37′8″S 150°41′49″E (digital)	Knights Hill
South Western Slopes and Eastern Riverina (Note: The South Western Slopes and Eastern Riverina station was an independent station with the callsign RVN from its 1964 sign-on until aggregation in 1989.)	Wagga Wagga	2 (VHF); 47 (UHF)	19 June 1964	200 kW; 600 kW	528 m 540 m	34°49′13″S 147°54′5″E	Mount Ulandra
