= WIN News =

Australian television news service

- Slogan: Your Local News
- Division of: WIN Television
- Opening Theme: National Nine News 2006–2008 theme
- Founded: 1962
- Headquarters: Wollongong, New South Wales, Australia
- Area served: Regional Australia (excluding Northern NSW/Gold Coast)
- Broadcast programs: WIN News
- Parent: WIN Corporation

WIN News is a local television news service in parts of regional Australia, produced by WIN Television. 23 regional bulletins and news update services are presented from WIN's headquarters in Wollongong with newsrooms in 26 locations.

== History ==
As well as its flagship nightly bulletin, WIN Television has, in the past, produced a number of public affairs programmes at its original Wollongong station, WIN-4, such as community affairs program Roving Eye and Sunday Review, a weekly review of international, national and local stories.

During the 1990s, WIN News was called WIN Nightly News, similar to that of Seven Nightly News. By the end of the decade, the networks combined covered most of Queensland, as well as New South Wales, Victoria, the Australian Capital Territory, South Australia and Tasmania. Prior to aggregation in 1994, Victoria's WIN News was called VIC News, and the network itself was called VIC TV. Tasmania's WIN News was called TasTV Evening News, and the network was called TasTV. South Australia's WIN News was called SES-8 Regional News and RTS-5A Regional News, and the network was called Channel 8 and Channel 5A. All were rebranded as WIN after aggregation, renaming their respective bulletins as WIN News only, with the exception of Victoria, which branded itself as WIN Local News and adopted a similar format to that of GTV-9 in Melbourne.

On 30 January 2006, WIN's Tasmanian news bulletins were moved from separate local and national bulletins to a single, half-hour bulletin featuring local, national and international news. This was reported by The Hobart Mercury as being due to the previous arrangement's poor ratings. WIN's main competitor in the area, Southern Cross Nightly News, had at the time a 64.9% share of the 6.00pm news audience during the 2005 survey period. In June 2011, WIN axed its Tasmanian weekend bulletins and replaced them with simulcasts of the Melbourne evening news, but were reintroduced a year later.

On 18 August 2006, WIN Television announced that Griffith's locally produced news bulletin would be axed due to high costs and revenue and would be merged with Wagga Wagga's half-hour bulletin, and the presenter, Jacalyn Cremasco's last bulletin was on the 18th. Before the network was branded as MTN, it was under the possession of Prime, the regional affiliate of Seven, but it was axed after a few years. It then became an affiliate of WIN, with its news adopting a similar format to that of WIN News. The decision was criticised by the local council and chamber of commerce, who, in a statement to the ABC's Media Watch, said that the isolation of the area increased the need for local content and information. The now-discontinued amalgamated Wagga Wagga bulletin is presented and produced from Wollongong. However there is still a WIN newsroom in the city to cover news in the region, and Jacalyn Cremasco is a reporter in the newsroom.

In April 2009, two regional bulletins were introduced in Queensland serving Mackay and the Whitsunday Islands and the Wide Bay area.

In March 2012, WIN announced it would axe its weeknight Western Australia bulletin with regional news coverage incorporated into a localised edition of Nine Afternoon News at 4:30pm, produced and presented from Perth. The last edition of WIN News Western Australia aired on 9 March 2012.

On 18 February 2013, WIN axed its pan-regional bulletin for the Mount Gambier and Riverland areas of South Australia. The program had been broadcast since the merger of separate bulletins for the two areas in October 2010. Ten staff at newsrooms in Mount Gambier and Loxton were made redundant. Both bulletins prior to a few years ago were produced separately from the two newsrooms, but they wereboth filmed at the Mount Gambier studios.

In June 2013, WIN announced it would discontinue local production of its Canberra bulletin and move it to Wollongong, however the company's studios in Kingston continued to operate as a newsgathering base, until it was sold and closed down a few years later, thus resulting in all staff being moved to a new office in the city.

In May 2015, in what was considered shocking closures, WIN axed its bulletins in Mildura, Victoria and Mackay, Queensland, with staff at both newsrooms being impacted. The decision was made in response to budget measures and a failure to catch up with Seven Local News in terms of ratings as well as poor advertising in the latter's case.

Following the transfer of broadcasting control of NRN to WIN in September 2017, following its purchase in May that year, WIN assumed production of existing weekday local news updates to northern New South Wales and the Gold Coast.

=== Consolidation to Wollongong ===
From 2015, WIN News cut costs to its regional news resources by consolidating presentation to its Wollongong headquarters. Its former regional studios were reduced in size from full-out production studios to small office-style newsgathering facilities upon each state's studio closure.

Following the closure of the broadcast centre in Griffith, Victorian bulletins were the next to centralise in October 2015, with the Ballarat studios being sold and demolished, followed by Queensland bulletins. Before, however, Queensland's services had two production studios, one in Rockhampton for the Central and Far North Queensland, Mackay District, and Sunshine Coast bulletins, and one in Toowoomba for production of the North Queensland, Wide Bay, and Southern Queensland bulletins. Both were closed and new studios, located in Maroochydore, were retained for production of All Australian News.

Tasmania had experienced reduction of its local presence after WIN's new affiliation with Network Ten. While all other WIN News bulletins moved to 6pm on 1 July 2016, their nightly bulletin moved to 5:30pm (30 minutes earlier than its leading rival Southern Cross News), making an attempt to replicate its composite newshour when they were a former Nine affiliate in the state. However, in September 2016, it scaled back to a half-hour local bulletin amid poor ratings; it moved back to its traditional 6pm timeslot on weeknights but retaining the weekend composite news at 5:30pm. In August 2018, it was announced that local studio production of the Tasmanian bulletin would be consolidated to Wollongong, and all weekend bulletins would be axed the following month. The consolidation was completed on 17 August 2018.

On 20 June 2019, WIN announced in a letter to staff it would close four of its newsrooms in Orange, Dubbo, Wagga Wagga, Albury and Bundaberg. The closures were made "based on the commercial viability of funding news in these areas" and were expected to affect approximately 30 jobs, in addition to losing the Griffith bulletin as well with the closure of the Wagga newsroom.

Consequently, the final editions of the Central West (Orange), Riverina (Wagga Wagga), Border North East (Albury) and Wide Bay (Bundaberg) editions aired on Friday 28 June 2019.

=== Return to Nine affiliation ===
Following the announcement on 12 March 2021 that WIN would be returning to the Nine Network affiliation from 1 July 2021, the network announced that WIN News would be moving to the earlier timeslot of 5:30pm in the remaining 12 markets before leading in to metropolitan Nine News bulletins at 6:00pm, effectively replacing Nine News Local (produced for SCA).

It was also announced on 24 May 2021 that the local WIN News bulletins in Victoria and Queensland would be scrapped and replaced with a single statewide news bulletin. Many jobs were lost as a result, where the average number of staff per newsroom was cut from 8 to 2.The Western NSW market was also confirmed to be getting a statewide news bulletin, with the Illawarra, Canberra and Tasmania bulletins as the only remaining local news bulletins on the network.

Along with the axing of the local news bulletins, the national All Australian News bulletin also ceased production at the end of June 2021.

Local bulletins were restored for Griffith and the Mildura-Sunraysia regions on 24 November 2025, presented from the network's Wollongong studios.

== Regional services ==
=== Local bulletins ===
==== Southern New South Wales & ACT ====
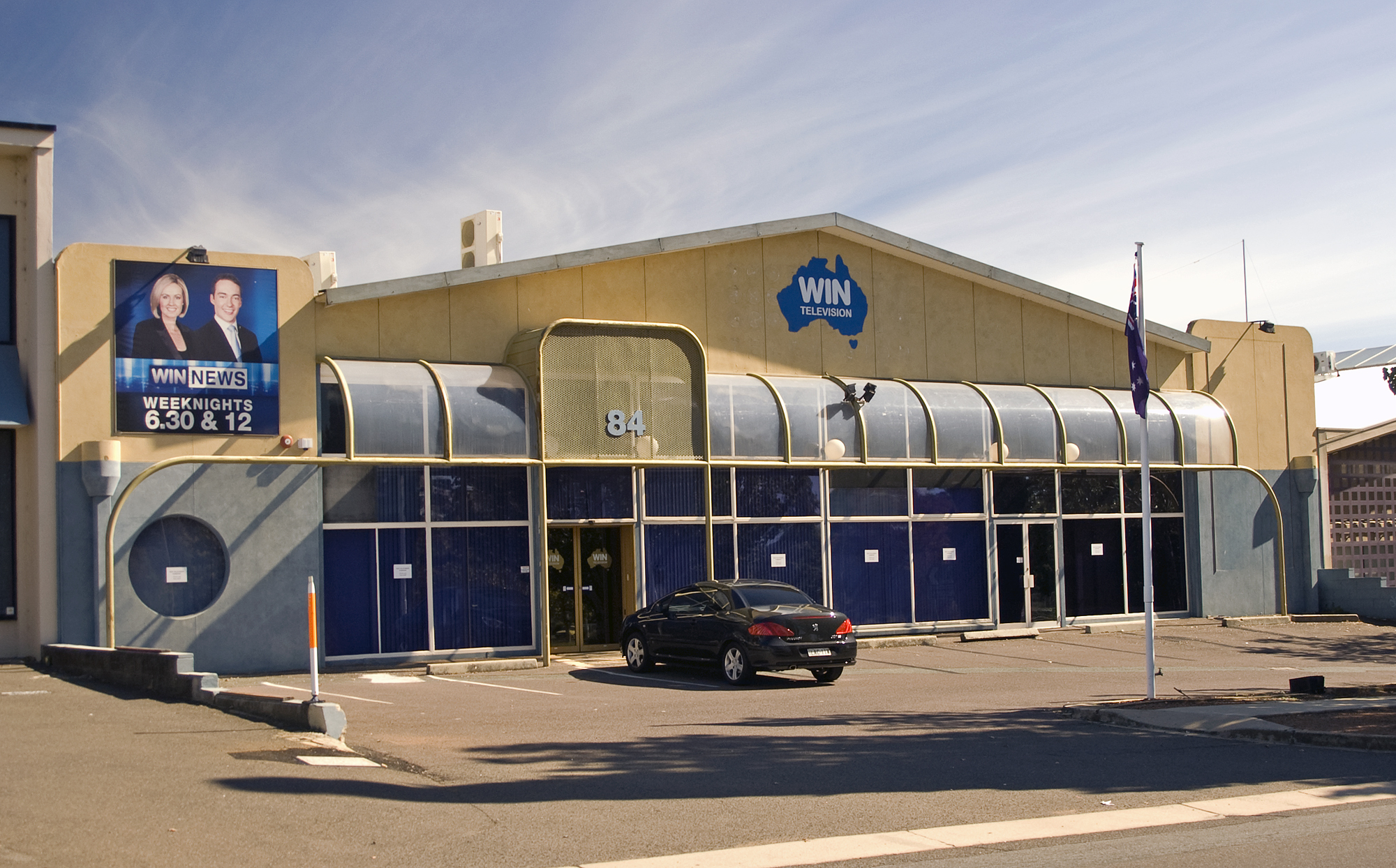
WIN TV studios in Kingston photographed in 2010

In southern New South Wales and the ACT, WIN News currently produces statewide-based, half-hour bulletins for five markets: Wollongong and the Illawarra, Wagga Wagga and the Riverina, the Central West, Griffith and the Murrumbidgee, and one for Canberra and its surrounding areas. Bulletins are produced and broadcast from WIN's Wollongong headquarters with news gathering teams and camera crews also based in Canberra.

The bulletins are presented by Bruce Roberts (Illawarra, Griffith and the ACT) and Georgia Elsley (Riverina and the Central West), with sport presenter Jared Constable and weather forecasts are presented by Bo Jeong.

The head of news for New South Wales and the ACT is Rob Beaumont.

==== Regional Victoria ====
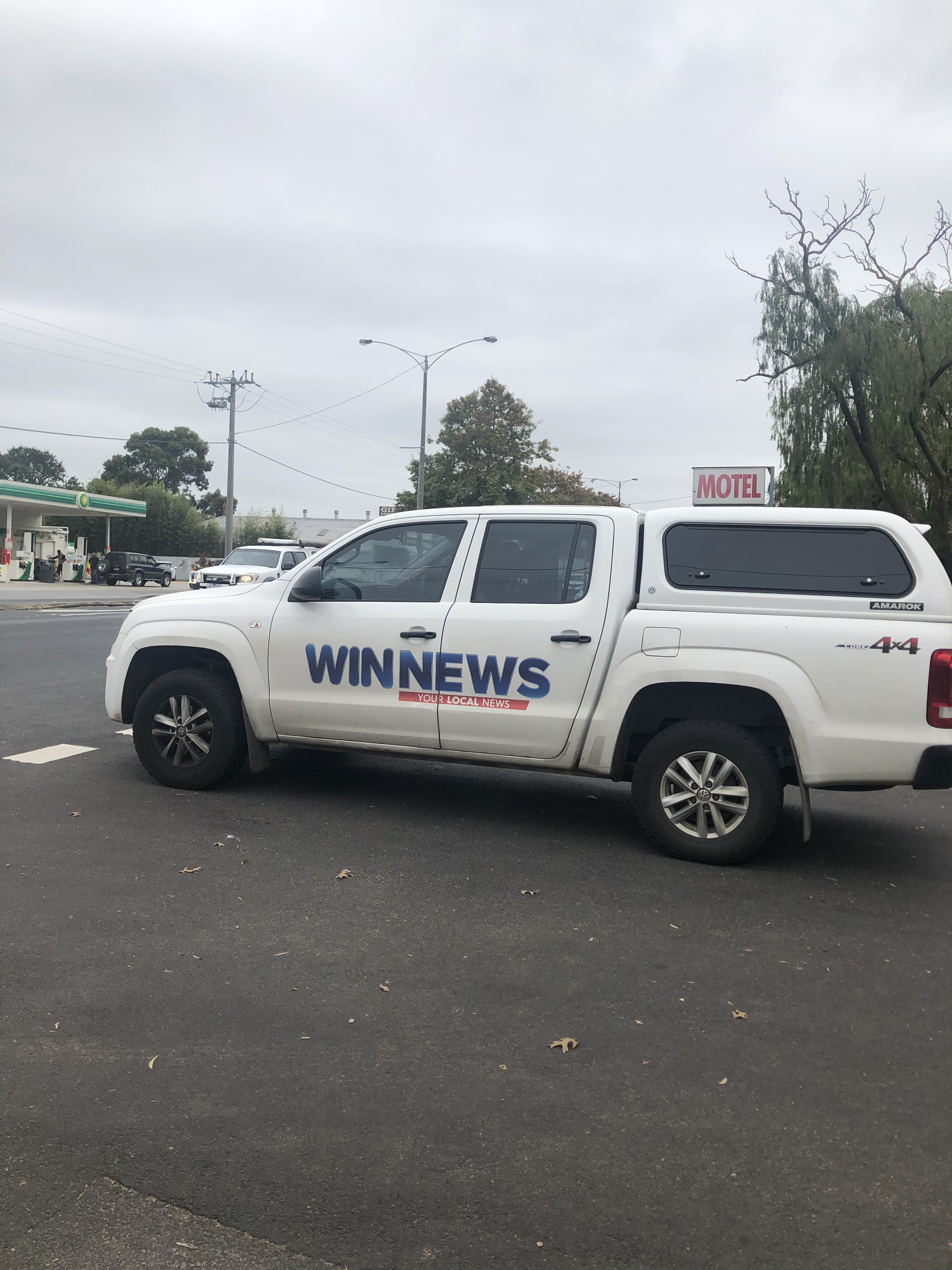
WIN News truck in Stratford, Victoria

WIN News currently produces statewide-based, half-hour bulletins for the five regional Victorian markets: Ballarat and Western Victoria, Bendigo and Central Victoria, Shepparton and the Border North East area, Albury and the Goulburn-Murray area, and Gippsland. The separate Mildura-Sunraysia market also receives its own edition. The bulletins are produced and broadcast from WIN's Wollongong headquarters with newsrooms also based in Ballarat, Bendigo, Shepparton and Traralgon.

The bulletin is presented by Bruce Roberts with sport presenter Jared Constable and weather forecasts are presented by Bo Jeong.

The news director for Victorian news services is Kelly Clappis.

==== Regional Queensland ====
WIN News currently produces statewide-based, half-hour bulletins for five of the seven regional Queensland markets: Cairns and Far North Queensland, Townsville and North Queensland, Rockhampton and Central Queensland, Toowoomba and Darling Downs, the Sunshine Coast, and Wide Bay–Burnett. The bulletins are broadcast from WIN's Wollongong headquarters.

The bulletins are presented by Georgia Elsley, with sport presenter Jared Constable and weather forecasts for all regions are presented by Bo Jeong.

The news director for all Queensland bulletins is Christian Jantzen.

==== Tasmania ====
WIN News Tasmania is presented by Bruce Roberts from Wollongong with sport presenter Jared Constable and weather forecasts are presented by Bo Jeong.

==== Darwin & Northern Territory ====
Following the acquisition of Nine Darwin in 2026, WIN announced its intention to launch a local edition of WIN News in November 2026, operating a newsroom in the city with studio presentation to take place in Wollongong.

=== Local updates ===
==== Northern New South Wales & Gold Coast ====
90-second news updates are broadcast throughout the day on weekdays for four of the five northern New South Wales and Gold Coast markets: Newcastle and the Hunter, the Northern Rivers and the Gold Coast, Coffs Harbour and the Mid North Coast, and Tamworth and New England. The updates are presented from WIN's Wollongong studios primarily by Tilli Andrew or Bo Jeong in conjunction with the other presenters (eg. Olivia Blunden, Jared Constable, Bruce Roberts or Jack Mahony) filling-in.

Following Network 10's acquisition of NRN Northern NSW & Gold Coast in May 2025, the news updates were rebranded as 10 News from 30 June onwards, with WIN currently continuing to produce the updates on their behalf.

==== Mount Gambier & Riverland ====
90-second news updates are broadcast throughout the day on weekdays for the Mount Gambier & Limestone Coast area, and for the Riverland area since late 2025. The updates were presented from WIN's Hobart studios by Hayden Cornes and Elsie Papworth until July 2026 when production moved to WIN's Wollongong studios, with Madison Arnold presenting.

==== Regional Western Australia ====
90-second news updates are broadcast throughout the day on weekdays across the Regional WA market since late 2025. The updates are presented from WIN's Wollongong studios by Georgia Elsley.

== Former bulletins ==
=== WIN News: Late Edition ===
WIN formerly produced statewide late bulletins, known as WIN News: Late Edition, for each east coast market. The bulletins featured stories from the various sub-regions in each market.

==== Southern New South Wales & ACT ====
The Southern NSW/ACT edition was broadcast at 12am from WIN's Wollongong headquarters.

The bulletins were presented by Geoff Phillips and Kerryn Johnston with sport presenter Amy Duggan and Senior Wollongong reporter by Michaela Gray.

==== Regional Victoria ====
The regional Victorian edition was broadcast at 12am from WIN's Ballarat Studios by alternating team of reporters/presenters.

The bulletins were presented by Bruce Roberts with sport presenter Wes Cusworth and weather forecasts were presented by Jane Bunn.

==== Regional Queensland ====
The regional Queensland edition was broadcast at 12am from WIN's Maroochydore studios.

The bulletins were presented by Paul Taylor or Sophie Hull with sport presented by David McLenaghan or Paul Murphy and weather forecasts were presented by Hannah McEwan.

=== All Australian News ===
WIN also produced the All Australian News, an hour-long national program which aired on WIN Television at 11.30pm on weeknights and again at 7am the following morning on weekdays. The program also aired on WIN Peach, WIN Bold and Sky News on WIN at 11am, 12pm and 1pm respectively, pre-empting the networks usual programming.

The All Australian News was a compilation of human interest and feature news stories that have aired on WIN's various regional news bulletins in Queensland, New South Wales, the ACT, Victoria and Tasmania. The All Australian News commenced airing in February 2014.

The program was presented from both WIN Television's headquarters in Wollongong and WIN's Maroochydore studios on the Sunshine Coast.

The final program aired on 30 June 2021, coinciding with WIN's new program supply agreement with the Nine Network beginning the following day.

=== Local updates ===
==== Southern New South Wales & Border North East ====
90-second news updates were broadcast throughout the day on weekdays for two of the four markets in southern New South Wales and Border North East, Orange and the Central West, Wagga Wagga and the Riverina region and Albury and the Border North East. The updates were presented from WIN's Wollongong studios by Chris Polzot in conjunction with other presenters filling in.

Following the announcement that the Riverina, Central West and the Border North East areas would be folded into the Western NSW and Regional Victorian editions of WIN News, the news updates ceased production on 30 June 2021.

==== Mount Gambier & Riverland ====
WIN News previously aired two separate bulletins, one for the Riverland and one for Mount Gambier and the Limestone Coast. These were later merged into a single bulletin produced out of the then WIN-owned NWS Adelaide in 2010, before the program was axed in 2013.

90-second news updates were later broadcast on weekday evenings in the Limestone Coast and Riverland markets. The updates, presented by Melissa Russell, were produced in co-operation with The Border Watch (for the Limestone Coast updates) and the Murray Pioneer (for the Riverland updates). They aired on all three WIN-owned network affiliated stations during the 6pm timeslot from 2014 until 2020 when the Limestone Coast updates were axed following the brief closure of The Border Watch on 21 August 2020, with the Riverland updates later axed the following month.

==== Wide Bay ====
90-second news updates were broadcast throughout the day on weekdays for the Wide Bay QLD area.
