= List of Australian television call signs =

Callsign suffixes
	State/Territory
Q	Queensland
N	New South Wales
C	Canberra
V	Victoria
T	Tasmania
D	Northern Territory
S	South Australia
W	Western Australia

This is a list of Australian television call signs. When a television broadcaster in Australia is granted a licence, a call sign consisting of a unique series of letters and numbers is allocated by the Australian Communications and Media Authority and are unique for each broadcast station.

== Background ==
For commercial networks, these are generally three letters. The first two letters are selected by the licensee, and the third letter often indicates the state or territory in which the station is located. Sometimes the third letter is also used as part of the abbreviation or mnemonic to name the station – for example GTV (General Television Corporation) represents "General TeleVision" or "General TV", although the V stands for Victoria.

Call signs in Australia do not include ITU prefixes. If one is required, "VL" is used. So, for example, GTV in an international context would actually be "VLGTV".

With the onset of aggregation in regional areas and digital television, the call signs do not retain the meaning that they did in the past. Stations will sometimes change frequency, or have different frequencies at different locations, such as re-transmission sites, where the same signal is re-broadcast in a different area. However, the three-letter codes have generally not changed and are still used within the industry.

A list of call signs is shown below, with original explanations of the call signs as of July 2022.

== National ==
- ABC – Australian Broadcasting Corporation
- SBS – Special Broadcasting Service

== New South Wales/Australian Capital Territory ==
=== Sydney ===
- ATN – Amalgamated Television New South Wales
- TCN – Television Corporation New South Wales
- TEN – TEN New South Wales

=== Southern NSW/Australian Capital Territory ===
- CBN – Country Broadcasting Services Limited New South Wales
- CTC – Capital Television Canberra
- WIN – Wollongong Illawarra New South Wales

=== Northern NSW ===
- NBN – Newcastle Broadcasting New South Wales
- NEN – New England New South Wales
- NRN – Northern Rivers New South Wales

=== Griffith/Murrumbidgee Irrigation Area ===
- AMN – Associated Media New South Wales
- MDN – Murrumbidgee Digital New South Wales
- MTN – Murrumbidgee Television New South Wales

=== Broken Hill ===
- BDN – Broken Hill Digital Television New South Wales
- BKN – Broken Hill New South Wales
- SCN – Southern Cross New South Wales

== Victoria ==
=== Melbourne ===
- ATV – Austarama Television Victoria
- GTV – General Television Victoria
- HSV – Herald Sun Victoria
- MGV – Melbourne Geelong Victoria

=== Regional ===
- AMV – Albury Murray Victoria
- BCV – Bendigo Central Victoria
- GLV – Gippsland Latrobe Valley Victoria
- VTV – Vic Television Victoria

=== Mildura and Sunraysia ===
- PTV – Prime Television Victoria
- STV – Sunraysia Television Victoria

== Queensland ==
=== Brisbane ===
- BTQ – Brisbane Television Queensland
- QTQ – Queensland Television Queensland
- TVQ – TeleVision Queensland

=== Regional ===
- RTQ – Rockhampton Television Queensland
- STQ – Sunshine Television Queensland
- TNQ – Telecasters North Queensland

=== Mount Isa ===
- IDQ – ITQ Digital Queensland
- IMP – Imparja Television
- ITQ – Mount Isa Telecasters Queensland

== South Australia ==
=== Adelaide ===
- ADS – Adelaide South Australia (also said to stand for Advertiser South Australia, named after the sister newspaper The Advertiser and radio station 5AD)
- CTS – Community Television South Australia
- SAS – South Australian Telecasters South Australia
- NWS – The News South Australia

=== Mount Gambier/South East ===
- MGS – Mount Gambier South Australia
- SDS – South East Digital Television South Australia
- SES – South East South Australia

=== Riverland ===
- LRS – Loxton Riverland South Australia
- RDS – Riverland Digital Television South Australia
- RTS – Riverland Television South Australia

=== Port Pirie/Spencer Gulf North ===
- GDS – Spencer Gulf Digital Television South Australia
- GTS – Spencer Gulf Telecasters South Australia
- SGS – Spencer Gulf South Australia

== Western Australia ==
=== Perth ===
- NEW – New Western Australia (also to spell the word NEW)
- STW – Swan Television Western Australia
- TVW – Television Western Australia

=== South West and Great Southern ===
- SSW – South West and Great Southern Western Australia
- SDW – SSW Digital Western Australia

=== Kalgoorlie ===
- VDW – VEW Digital Western Australia
- VEW – View Western Australia

=== Geraldton ===
- GDW – GTW Digital Western Australia
- GTW – Geraldton Telecasters Western Australia

=== Remote and Regional Western Australia ===
- WAW – Western Australia Western Australia
- WDW – WAW Digital Western Australia
- WOW – WIN of Western Australia

== Tasmania ==
- TDT – Television Digital Tasmania
- TNT – Television Northern Tasmania
- TVT – TeleVision Tasmania

== Northern Territory ==
=== Darwin ===
- DTD – Digital Television Darwin
- NTD – Northern Territory Darwin
- TND – Telecasters Northern Territory Darwin (or Television Northern Darwin)

== Other callsigns ==
=== Remote Central and Eastern Australia ===
- CDT – Central Digital Television
- IMP – Imparja Television
- QQQ – Queensland Queensland Queensland
- HPO – High Power Open Narrowcasting
- ACT – Aboriginal Community Television

== Former callsigns ==
- ABC – Australian Broadcasting Corporation Canberra
- ABN – Australian Broadcasting Corporation New South Wales
- CTN – Community Television New South Wales
- TSN – Television Sydney New South Wales
- CWN – Central Western Slopes New South Wales
- ABWN – Australian Broadcasting Corporation Wollongong New South Wales
- ABSN – Australian Broadcasting Corporation Southern New South Wales
- ABCN – Australian Broadcasting Corporation Central New South Wales
- ABMN – Australian Broadcasting Corporation M New South Wales
- ABQN – Australian Broadcasting Corporation Q New South Wales
- ECN – East Coast New South Wales
- RTN – Richmond and Tweed Heads New South Wales
- ABDN – Australian Broadcasting Corporation Dorrigo New South Wales
- ABHN – Australian Broadcasting Corporation Hunter River New South Wales
- ABMIN – Australian Broadcasting Corporation Mungindi New South Wales
- ABRN – Australian Broadcasting Corporation Richmond and Tweed New South Wales
- ABTN – Australian Broadcasting Corporation Taree New South Wales
- ABUN – Australian Broadcasting Corporation Upper Namoi New South Wales
- RVN – Riverina New South Wales
- ABGN – Australian Broadcasting Corporation Griffith New South Wales
- ABLN – Australian Broadcasting Corporation Broken Hill New South Wales
- ABV – Australian Broadcasting Corporation Victoria
- ABRV – Australian Broadcasting Corporation Ballarat Victoria
- BTV – Ballarat Television Victoria - (also briefly 'RTV' during aggregation preparations)
- ABSV – Australian Broadcasting Corporation Swan Hill Victoria
- ABWV – Australian Broadcasting Corporation Western Victoria
- ABMV – Australian Broadcasting Corporation Mildura Victoria
- ABGV – Australian Broadcasting Corporation Goulburn Valley Victoria
- GMV – Goulburn Murray Victoria - (also briefly 'RTV' during aggregation preparations)
- ABLV – Australian Broadcasting Corporation Latrobe Valley Victoria
- RTV – Regional Television Victoria - (used briefly for BTV and GMV during aggregation preparations)
- CTV – Community Television Victoria
- MDV – Mildura Digital Television Victoria
- ABAV – Australian Broadcasting Corporation Albury Victoria
- ABEV – Australian Broadcasting Corporation Bendigo Victoria
- ABQ – Australian Broadcasting Corporation Queensland
- ABCTQ – Australian Broadcasting Corporation Clermont Queensland
- ABDQ – Australian Broadcasting Corporation Darling Downs Queensland
- ABEQ – Australian Broadcasting Corporation Emerald Queensland
- ABGQ – Australian Broadcasting Corporation Goondiwindi Queensland
- ABMQ – Australian Broadcasting Corporation Mackay Queensland
- ABMSQ – Australian Broadcasting Corporation Miles Queensland
- ABNQ – Australian Broadcasting Corporation North Queensland
- ABRQ – Australian Broadcasting Corporation Rockhampton Queensland
- ABSQ – Australian Broadcasting Corporation Southern Downs Queensland
- ABSEQ – Australian Broadcasting Corporation Springsure Queensland
- ABTQ – Australian Broadcasting Corporation Townsville Queensland
- ABWQ – Australian Broadcasting Corporation Wide Bay Queensland
- ABIQ – Australian Broadcasting Corporation Mount Isa Queensland
- ABMKQ – Australian Broadcasting Corporation Mary Kathleen Queensland
- ABAQ – Australian Broadcasting Corporation Alpha Queensland
- ABAAQ – Australian Broadcasting Corporation Augathella Queensland
- ABBQ – Australian Broadcasting Corporation Barcaldine Queensland
- ABBLQ – Australian Broadcasting Corporation Blackall Queensland
- ABCAQ – Australian Broadcasting Corporation Cunnamulla Queensland
- ABCEQ – Australian Broadcasting Corporation Charleville Queensland
- ABCLQ – Australian Broadcasting Corporation Cloncurry Queensland
- ABDIQ – Australian Broadcasting Corporation Dirranbandi Queensland
- ABHQ – Australian Broadcasting Corporation Hughenden Queensland
- ABJQ – Australian Broadcasting Corporation Julia Creek Queensland
- ABLQ – Australian Broadcasting Corporation Longreach Queensland
- ABMLQ – Australian Broadcasting Corporation Mitchell Queensland
- ABMNQ – Australian Broadcasting Corporation Morven Queensland
- ABRAQ – Australian Broadcasting Corporation Roma Queensland
- ABRDQ – Australian Broadcasting Corporation Richmond Queensland
- ABSGQ – Australian Broadcasting Corporation St. George Queensland
- ABWNQ – Australian Broadcasting Corporation Winton Queensland
- DDQ – Darling Downs Queensland
- ABNPQ – Australian Broadcasting Corporation Northern Peninsula Queensland
- FNQ – Far Northern Queensland
- MVQ – Mackay Vision Queensland
- SDQ – Southern Downs Queensland
- SEQ – South East Queensland
- WBQ – Wide Bay Queensland
- CTQ – Community Television Queensland
- ABS – Australian Broadcasting Corporation South Australia
- ABGS – Australian Broadcasting Corporation Mount Gambier South Australia
- ABRS – Australian Broadcasting Corporation Riverland South Australia
- ABNS – Australian Broadcasting Corporation Spencer Gulf North South Australia
- ABCS – Australian Broadcasting Corporation Ceduna South Australia
- ABLCS – Australian Broadcasting Corporation Leigh Creek South Australia
- ABWS – Australian Broadcasting Corporation Woomera South Australia
- ACE – Adelaide Community and Educational Television
- ABW – Australian Broadcasting Corporation Western Australia
- ABAW – Australian Broadcasting Corporation Albany Western Australia
- ABCW – Australian Broadcasting Corporation Central Agricultural area Western Australia
- ABSW – Australian Broadcasting Corporation South West Western Australia
- ABKW – Australian Broadcasting Corporation Kalgoorlie Western Australia
- ABEW – Australian Broadcasting Corporation Esperance Western Australia
- ABNW – Australian Broadcasting Corporation Norseman Western Australia
- ABSBW – Australian Broadcasting Corporation Southern Cross/Bullfinch Western Australia
- ABGW – Australian Broadcasting Corporation Geraldton Western Australia
- ABCMW – Australian Broadcasting Corporation Morawa Western Australia
- ABCNW – Australian Broadcasting Corporation Carnarvon Western Australia
- ABDW – Australian Broadcasting Corporation Dampier Western Australia
- ABKAW – Australian Broadcasting Corporation Karratha Western Australia
- ABMW – Australian Broadcasting Corporation Moora Western Australia
- ABPHW – Australian Broadcasting Corporation Port Hedland Western Australia
- ABRBW – Australian Broadcasting Corporation Roebourne Western Australia
- BTW – Bunbury Television Western Australia
- GSW – Great Southern Western Australia
- ATW – Access Television Western Australia
- CTW – Community Television Western Australia
- ABCNW – Australian Broadcasting Corporation Carnarvon Western Australia
- ABDW – Australian Broadcasting Corporation Dampier Western Australia
- ABKAW – Australian Broadcasting Corporation Karratha Western Australia
- ABMW – Australian Broadcasting Corporation Moora Western Australia
- ABPHW – Australian Broadcasting Corporation Port Hedland Western Australia
- ABRBW – Australian Broadcasting Corporation Roebourne Western Australia
- ABT – Australian Broadcasting Corporation Tasmania
- ABKT – Australian Broadcasting Corporation King Island Tasmania
- ABNT – Australian Broadcasting Corporation North Eastern Tasmania
- ABD – Australian Broadcasting Corporation Darwin
- ABAD – Australian Broadcasting Corporation Alice Springs Darwin
- ABKD – Australian Broadcasting Corporation Katherine Darwin
- ABTD – Australian Broadcasting Corporation Tennant Creek Darwin

== See also ==
- List of Australian radio station callsigns
- Television in Australia
- Callsigns in Australia
- Television stations in Australia
