= AMN (TV station) =

- Griffith and Murrumbidgee Irrigation Area; Australia
- Channels: Digital: 30 (UHF); Virtual: 8
- Branding: Nine, WIN

Programming
- Language: English
- Network: WIN Television
- Affiliations: Nine

Ownership
- Owner: WIN Corporation Pty Ltd; (WIN Television Griffith Pty. Ltd.)
- Sister stations: MTN

History
- First air date: 5 October 1997
- Former channel number: Analogue: 31
- Former affiliations: Seven (1997–2012); Nine (2012–2016); Ten (2016–2021)
- Call sign meaning: Associated Media New South Wales

Technical information
- Licensing authority: ACMA
- ERP: See table below
- HAAT: 418 m
- Transmitter coordinates: See table below

Links
- Public licence information: Profile

AMN is a television station licensed to serve Griffith and the surrounding Murrumbidgee Irrigation Area (M.I.A.). The station is owned and operated by WIN Corporation as a Nine Network affiliate, WIN Television.

WIN Television is the sole commercial television broadcaster in the Griffith and M.I.A. area, also providing MTN, a Seven Network affiliate, and a Network 10 affiliate MDN, a supplementary station.

== History ==
The Australian Broadcasting Authority relaxed the rules regarding station ownership in solus markets in the mid-1990s. The changes allowed for one company to operate two stations without competition, provided the Authority did not have reason to believe another company would be interested. MTN applied for a Section 38A licence in 1995, and after being refused once, challenged the Authority, and was successful on appeal – ultimately being granted the second license on 18 July 1996. The second channel launched on 5 October 1997, on UHF channel 31 using the callsign AMN. It was a direct feed of Prime Television Orange, with the exception of its local news, which AMN replaced with an alternative program. Since then, AMN has changed from being a direct feed of Prime7 to being a feed of Seven Network Sydney.

WIN Corporation brought MTN and AMN from then-owner Associated Media Investments on 6 July 1998.

As part of Australia's digital transition, AMN ceased broadcasting in analogue on 5 June 2012.

On 1 July 2016, to reflect WIN's new affiliation agreement with Network Ten, AMN and MDN swapped affiliates – with AMN becoming a Ten affiliate while MDN became a Nine affiliate.

On 1 July 2021, to reflect WIN's new affiliation agreement with Nine Network, AMN and MDN swapped affiliates – with AMN becoming a Nine affiliate while MDN became a 10 affiliate.

== Programming ==
AMN carries programming from Nine Network, which includes the 9 News Sydney bulletin as well as the southern NSW/Wagga Wagga WIN News bulletin. The station also carries the Sydney feeds of 9Gem, 9Go! and 9Life.

=== News ===
WIN News Griffith (formerly MTN9 News) was a local news bulletin broadcast on MTN. The news bulletin premiered the same year as MTN launched, seeing it run for over forty years. WIN News Griffith was axed in August 2006, with WIN Television amalgamating the news bulletins from Griffith and Wagga Wagga into one Riverina bulletin presented from WIN's Wollongong studios The last bulletin aired on 18 August 2006. Following the bulletin's cancellation, WIN maintained a journalist, sport reporter and camera operator in Griffith to produce news stories, however, in 2013 this staff was reduced to a single video journalist, and then in 2015 was removed entirely to be replaced by a roving journalist from the Wagga Wagga station. Following the cancellation of the bulletin, Griffith City Council petitioned regional broadcasters in neighbouring areas to present a local news bulletin. This has since been abandoned.

In November 2025, WIN News relaunched a local news bulletin for the Griffith and MIA region. The bulletin is presented by Bruce Roberts from the networks Wollongong studios.

=== Channels ===
The following is a list of channels broadcast on AMN.

AMN–30:

LCN	Channel
8	9HD
80	9HD
81	9Gem
82	9Go!
83	9Life
85	Gold

== See also ==
- WIN Corporation
- Regional television in Australia
