= WOW (TV station) =

Television station in remote and regional Western Australia

- Remote and Regional Western Australia; Australia
- Channels: Digital: see table below
- Branding: Nine, WIN

Programming
- Language: English
- Network: WIN Television
- Affiliations: Nine

Ownership
- Owner: WIN Corporation; (WIN Television WA Pty Ltd)

History
- First air date: 26 March 1999
- Former affiliations: Nine Network (primary) (26 March 1999 – 30 June 2016, 1 July 2021 – present); Network 10 (26 March 1999 – 2 March 2012, 1 July 2016 – 30 June 2021)

Technical information
- Licensing authority: Australian Communications and Media Authority
- ERP: see table below
- HAAT: see table below
- Transmitter coordinates: see table below

Links
- Public licence information: Profile
- Website: www.wintv.com.au

WOW is an Australian television station licensed to WIN Television, serving regional and remote Western Australia. The station officially commenced transmissions on 26 March 1999 as the second commercial regional broadcaster in Western Australia, alongside former monopoly, Golden West Network.

== History ==
Prior to WIN Television's expansion into Western Australia, the Golden West Network was the sole commercial network operating in regional areas, and carried programming from all three privately owned networks – Seven, Nine and Ten. On 26 March 1999, WIN Western Australia officially commenced transmissions as an affiliate of Nine and Ten. This in turn left GWN to become a sole Seven affiliate.

WIN has struggled for ratings success in remote Western Australia, in part due to GWN/GWN7's 30-year run as the sole commercial television outlet in the region. WIN WA has run second to GWN7 in every ratings survey to date. The second ratings survey in 2005 placed WIN WA with only a 38.3% commercial audience share in prime time, compared to GWN7 with 61.7%.

A proposal for a third television station – a joint venture between WIN Corporation and Prime Media Group, owner of GWN7 – was submitted to the Australian Communications and Media Authority in 2006. Similar to Mildura Digital Television, the new channel will operate under a Section 38B license, as a Network Ten affiliate named Ten West.

=== 2010 and beyond ===
The new decade saw the introduction of digital television, with the Central Wheatbelt, Kalgoorlie, Karratha and Mingenew digital transmitters launching on 10 June 2010. The broadcasters shared a single digital transmitter for GWN7, WIN WA and the new Ten West in standard definition at each location.

Digital transmitter upgrades continued on 28 July 2011, with Bunbury and surrounds being introduced to the full suite of digital channels for the first time, including GO! and GEM. On 30 July 2011, the regional networks began broadcasting on the Viewer Access Satellite Television platform. Analogue transmissions ceased broadcasting statewide on 25 June 2013.

On 10 March 2016, WIN HD and 9Life launched on both terrestrial and satellite platforms. Gold ceased transmission on the same day.

On 1 July 2016, WIN Television ceased their program supply agreement with Nine Network, resulting in a Ten Network affiliation. West Digital Television picked up the Nine Network affiliation on 2 July 2016.

On 1 July 2021, WIN returned to Nine program supply agreement. West Digital Television picked up the Network 10 affiliation on the same day.

== Programming ==
WIN Western Australia originally sourced programming from the Nine Network and Network Ten. However, the introduction of Ten West and the increase in digital television penetration in 2012 turned WIN WA into a sole Nine Network affiliate, with almost identical programming to STW-9 Perth. On 1 July 2016, WIN WA aligned with Network Ten after losing its affiliation with Nine Network to Southern Cross Austereo. On 1 July 2021, WIN WA aligned with the Nine Network. WIN Western Australia carries programming from Nine Network, which includes Nine News Perth, A Current Affair and national news bulletins. The station also carries the Perth feeds of 9Gem, 9Go! and 9Life.

=== News ===
WIN Western Australia was initially created with no local news service. At the same time, the then-owners of STW-9 Perth, Sunraysia Television, was not prepared to simulcast news programming with WIN. As a result, WIN formed a deal with Network Ten affiliate NEW-10 to carry a delayed broadcast of 10 News First main 5pm program each night.

WIN began its own regional news service, WIN News Western Australia, on Monday 13 November 2006. Initially presented from WIN's Wollongong headquarters by Kerryn Johnston, and latterly Amy Taylor, studio presentation moved to Perth a year later following the sale of STW-9 to WIN Corporation. Presenters of the regional bulletin included Nine News weather presenter Natalia Cooper, former ABC News journalist Deborah Kennedy and latterly Matt Tinney. Reporters and video journalists were based at district newsrooms in Albany, Broome, Bunbury, Geraldton, Kalgoorlie and STW-9's Perth studios.

In March 2012, WIN announced it would axe its weeknight Western Australia bulletin with regional news coverage incorporated into a localised edition of Nine Afternoon News at 4:30pm on weekday afternoons, produced and presented from Perth. As a result, news bureaus in Geraldton, Albany and Broome were closed down, with only Bunbury and Kalgoorlie retained. The last edition of WIN News Western Australia aired on Friday 9 March 2012. The localised Nine Afternoon News edition was axed on 1 July 2013, but latterly reintroduced on Monday 7 October 2013.

In addition to STW-9's local bulletins, WIN WA has previously carried Nine News' national bulletins. On 1 July 2016, WIN switched to a Network Ten affiliation, which saw the return of 10 News First live from the NEW-10 Perth studios. On 1 July 2021, WIN switched back to a Nine Network affiliation, which saw the return of Nine News live from the STW-9 Perth studios.

== Availability ==
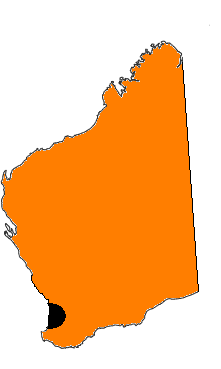
The area allotted to WOW for television broadcasting (shown in orange). The Perth license area is shown in black.

WIN Television is available statewide in digital terrestrial and digital satellite format. The full suite of digital services, including 9HD, 9Gem, 9Go! and 9Life, are available in all areas with digital transmissions.

Below is a table showing the logical channel numbers for the full suite of digital services.

| LCN | Service |
|---|---|
| 8 | Channel 9 |
| 80 | 9HD |
| 81 | 9Gem |
| 82 | 9Go! |
| 85 | 9Life |

=== Terrestrial ===
Digital terrestrial transmissions are available in all populated cities and major towns of regional Western Australia. Analogue terrestrial services ceased transmission statewide on 25 June 2013.

=== Satellite ===
Digital satellite transmissions are available direct-to-home on the Viewer Access Satellite Television platform in areas that are not covered by adequate terrestrial transmissions.
