= Seven Regional WA =

Television network in Western Australia

- Country: Australia
- Broadcast area: Remote and Regional Western Australia
- Affiliates: Seven (O&O)

Programming
- Language: English
- Picture format: 1080i HDTV MPEG-4

Ownership
- Parent: Seven Media Group
- Sister channels: 7two 7mate TVSN; Racing.com

History
- Launched: 10 March 1967
- Former names: South West Telecasters (1967–1979); Golden West Network (GWN) (1979–2011); GWN7 (2011–2022)

Availability

Terrestrial
- Freeview (virtual): 6

Seven Regional WA is an Australian television network serving all of Western Australia outside metropolitan Perth. It launched on 10 March 1967 as BTW-3 in Bunbury, and became known as the Golden West Network (GWN, and later GWN7) in 1979. It serves one of the largest geographic television markets in the world—almost one-third of the continent.

In 2021, Prime Media Group merged with Seven and its independent branding was retired in 2022.

== History ==
=== Origins ===
Seven Regional WA began life as a group of smaller, independent stations:

- 10 March 1967: BTW–3 Bunbury
  - 23 August 1968: GSW–9 Mount Barker – relay
  - 29 August 1974: GSW–10 Albany – relay
- 18 June 1971: VEW–8 Kalgoorlie
  - 29 November 1971: VEW–3 Kambalda – relay
- 21 January 1977: GTW–11 Geraldton

Prior to these stations signing on, remote Western Australia had been one of the few areas of Australia without local television; the only television outlets in the area were relays of ABC Television out of Perth.

Jack Bendat purchased South West Telecasters (owner of BTW/GSW) in 1979, and changed the company's name to Golden West Network (GWN).

GWN's mascot, Doopa Dog.

GWN applied to broadcast an additional service on 31 October 1984, when the Australian Broadcasting Tribunal called for applications to broadcast to Christmas Island and the Cocos (Keeling) Islands via satellite as part of the Remote Commercial Television License (RCTS) scheme. GWN was granted the Remote Commercial Television License (RCTS) in June 1985 and the service went to air on 18 October 1986 using the call-sign WAW.

Not long after, GWN continued to expand within Western Australia, acquiring Mid-Western Television (owner of VEW-8 Kalgoorlie) in December 1985 for A$7 million, and Geraldton Telecasters (owner of GTW-11) in March 1987 for an undisclosed amount. The takeovers gave GWN a monopoly over all commercial television services in regional Western Australia. In 1987, Bendat and Kerry Stokes merged their media interests into joint company BDC Investments. Later that year, Northern Star Holdings purchased BDC for A$206 million. Northern Star were forced to sell GWN to satisfy existing media regulations. GWN was sold back to Stokes in December 1988 for A$54 million, who upgraded equipment across GWN. In April 1990, the callsigns BTW and GSW were merged, to become SSW. During the late 1980s, GWN was promoted as GWN Satellite Television and aired programs from mostly the Nine Network plus a few from Seven and Ten with STW's Channel Nine (later National Nine) News (from Perth) providing the national news link.

=== 1990s to the 2000s ===
Kerry Stokes gained control of the Seven Network in 1995, and attempted to sell GWN to Seven in return for more shares. Seven Network shareholders agreed to the trade in April 1996 – a deal which would have seen Seven acquire GWN for A$72.8 million thus becoming the regional network affiliate for Western Australia. The arrangement was called off when the Australian Competition & Consumer Commission found that a 15-year exclusive programming deal GWN made with the Nine Network was anti competitive and opposed the acquisition. The Seven Network subsequently dropped their plans to purchase GWN. And as a result, GWN soon ended its programming deal with Nine for exclusive broadcast of its shows in regional areas of the state.

Prime Media Group purchased GWN in November 1996 from Stokes for A$71 million. Remote Western Australia was one of the few areas of regional Australia that was not aggregated, given its small population. This ended in 1997, when WIN Television was granted the rights to a second television license in regional Western Australia, ending GWN's monopoly of all three Australian commercial channels. In March 1999, GWN opted to become a sole Seven Network affiliate, in-line with its eastern sister, Prime Television. As a result, WIN Television WA picked up both the Nine Network and Network 10 affiliations.

GWN's transmission operations were moved from Bunbury to Prime Media Group's digital broadcast facility in Canberra in April 2005. Programming was delivered to regional Western Australia via a satellite feed.

A proposal for a third television station – a joint venture between GWN's parent company Prime Media Group and WIN Corporation – was submitted to the Australian Communications & Media Authority in 2006. Similar to Mildura Digital Television, the new channel will operate under a Section 38B licence, as a Network 10 affiliate named Ten West.

=== 2010 and beyond ===
The new decade saw the introduction of digital television, with the Central Wheatbelt, Kalgoorlie, Karratha and Mingenew digital transmitters launching on 10 June 2010. The broadcasters shared a single digital transmitter for GWN, WIN WA and the new Ten West in standard definition.

On 15 January 2011, Prime Media Group reported that GWN and Prime were to rebrand to GWN7 and Prime7 respectively, in connection to their strong relations with the metropolitan stations of the Seven Network. Their news bulletins were quickly renamed as GWN7 News and Prime7 News. These bulletins were relaunched on 16 January 2011 at 5:57pm.

Digital transmitter upgrades continued on 28 July 2011, with Bunbury and surrounds being introduced to the full suite of digital channels for the first time, including 7two and 7mate. On 30 July 2011, the regional networks began broadcasting on the Viewer Access Satellite Television platform.

On 12 February 2018, GWN7's master control facilities (transmission and technical operations) were transferred to Prime Media's national playout centre in Canberra, with the WA facilities beamed through satellite and microwave links. Playout of GWN7's programming was later transferred to Mediahub located in the Sydney suburb of Ingleburn (which houses playout for ABC Television and WIN Television), before once again transferred to a facility operated by Australia's telco provider Telstra (shared with hybrid-funded broadcaster SBS Television).

=== 2021: Merger with Seven ===
On 1 November 2021, Seven West Media announced that it would acquire all the shares and subsidiaries of Prime Media Group. This was SWM's second attempt at purchasing Prime Media, after its previous attempt in 2019 was thwarted by Australian Community Media boss Antony Catalano and rival WIN Corporation owner Bruce Gordon, citing Seven's debt problems at the time and its poor ratings performance as the reason for their refusal. Prime shareholders approved the deal on 23 December, with the sale completed on 31 December. Prior to Seven’s ownership, GWN7 (alongside its sister Prime7 stations) was the only commercial affiliate not carrying full metro network branding on-air, in contrast to WOW's owner WIN which carried Nine Network branding full-time since its return to carrying Nine's programming in 2021. On 23 May 2022, Seven West Media announced that the on-air branding would be unified under Seven Network branding; the GWN7 name was retired on 25 July 2022.

== Programming ==
Since becoming a full Seven owned and operated station, its on-air schedule had become almost identical to that of its metropolitan counterpart, TVW in Perth, including Seven News Perth which airs live across the network. It also produces a weeknight local news service, live at 5:30pm. Since the network's inception, it has featured a broad range of original regional programming, including the children's program Doopa's Club featuring the station mascot Doopa Dog; as well as community service strand GWN7 InfoNet, a series of short updates listing local community events.

=== Seven News Regional WA ===
The GWN7 Local News logo used until 2022.

The GWN7 News logo used between 2011 and 2018.

Seven News Regional WA (previously known as Golden West News, GWN News, GWN7 News and GWN7 Local News) is the network's regional news service. Its main 30-minute program, airing live at 5:30pm on weeknights before Seven News Perth, deals primarily with local news and current affairs. As of March 2012, they produced the only dedicated local news program for regional Western Australia, following WIN's axing of its Western Australian news service.

The bulletin is presented from Seven's Spencer Street newsroom in Bunbury CBD by Noel Brunning (news and sport), with weather presented by rotating Bunbury-based reporters (Campbell Greaves, Charlotte Italiano, Josiah McMeekin and Liz Robbins). Weather had previously been presented by Shauna Willis until her departure in October 2022 with no permanent replacement.

The bulletin also has reporters and camera crews based at newsrooms in Albany, Kalgoorlie, Karratha, Geraldton and Broome.

Since the closure of the Roberts Crescent studios in 2018, production control of the bulletin is done at Seven's regional headquarters in the Canberra suburb of Watson, with news reports and Bunbury studio presentation received through satellite and microwave before transmission.

In July 2022, the GWN7 Local News brand was retired and now falls under the Seven News brand.

== Availability ==
Seven Regional WA broadcast areas: SSW (green), VEW (blue), GTW (purple), WAW (yellow)

The network is available statewide in digital terrestrial and digital satellite format. The full suite of digital services, including 7two, 7mate, TVSN and Racing.com, are available in all areas with digital transmissions.

Below is a table showing the logical channel numbers (LCN) for the full suite of digital services.

LCN	Service
6	Seven Regional WA
62	7two
63	7mate
65	TVSN
68	Racing.com

=== Terrestrial ===
Seven Regional WA operates four television station licences in regional and remote areas of Western Australia – SSW in the South West, VEW in the Goldfields, GTW in the Mid West and WAW covering remaining remote areas of the state. Terrestrial transmissions are available in many regional cities and towns, including Albany, Broome, Bunbury, Carnarvon, Geraldton, Kalgoorlie, Karratha, Merredin, as well as others.

Digital terrestrial transmissions were available in all populated cities and major towns of regional Western Australia. Analog terrestrial services ceased transmission statewide on 25 June 2013.

=== Satellite ===
Digital satellite transmissions were available direct-to-home on the Viewer Access Satellite Television platform in areas that were not covered by adequate terrestrial transmissions.

== Logos ==
The Golden West Network became a network in 1986, with a shared logo produced and used across the regional stations, featuring the letters GWN inside an outlined oval surrounded by an orbiting ring. This logo was used across the network until 1995, when a new logo was introduced with the removal of outlined oval surrounding the letters GWN. Following this, 2001 saw the launch of a new simplified yellow logo, with the removal of the orbiting ring. This logo was launched concurrently with a similarly design logo on Prime Television. Following the 2011 relaunch, a new logo was introduced which features the Seven Network logo. The relaunch logo featuring Seven Network was revised in 2013 from multi colour to be a single colour logo.

1986–1995

1995–2001

2001 – 16 January 2011

16 January 2011 – 25 July 2022

== See also ==
- Television broadcasting in Australia
- Regional television in Australia
