= Alive and Cooking =

Australian cooking TV program

- Presented by: James Reeson
- Country of origin: Australia
- Original language: English
- No. of seasons: 8
- No. of episodes: 700+

Production
- Production location: Sydney, Australia
- Running time: 30 minutes (inc. commercials)

Original release
- Network: WIN Television (Regional); Network Ten (Metropolitan, 2017); Gold (Highlights); Nine Network (Adelaide & Perth, 2008-2013); 9Gem (Metropolitan & Regional, 2010-2016)
- Release: 2 June 2008 – 30 June 2016

Alive and Cooking was an Australian television cooking show hosted by celebrity chef James Reeson. The program was produced by WIN Television, airing five days a week on the WIN Network.

== History ==
In 2007, WIN Television announced a new cooking show to replace Fresh with the Australian Women's Weekly, a similar show provided by the Nine Network. At the time, WIN were in the middle of intense negotiations with Nine, which resulted in the removal of some Nine-produced programs from the schedule.

Alive and Cooking aired its first episode on Monday 2 June 2008 at 11.30am on most of WIN's regional stations.

It remained in that time slot for the duration of the entire first season. In 2009, the Nine Network axed Fresh with the Australian Women's Weekly and replaced it with Alive and Cooking. In late 2009, the Nine Network expanded Nine Morning News to one hour as part of an expansion of Nine News content across their daytime schedule which resulted in Alive and Cooking being dropped from the Nine daytime schedule. WIN, Nine Adelaide and Nine Perth (both owned by WIN), and NBN Television moved the show to 3pm weekdays. In July 2010, WIN & NBN moved the show back to its original 11:30am weekday timeslot in place of Nine Morning News. Nine restarted showing the program again from 24 September 2010 with the launch of their new digital sub-channel 9Gem.

== Availability ==
Alive and Cooking is broadcast across Australia on GEM. The program has not aired on WIN since 30 June 2016 due to becoming a Channel Ten show. The show returned later that year, airing at 2:30pm as it was previously.

From 31 July 2017, the 8th season will be broadcast at 3.30pm weekdays on Network Ten, with 70 episodes to be screened until early November.

== Merchandise ==
Some "Food For All Seasons" DVDs have been released, plus a number of cooking books featuring recipes from the show.

== James Reeson ==
James Reeson
- Born: Bristol, United Kingdom
- Occupations: Chef, television presenter

James Reeson is a British celebrity chef who is famous in Australia. He is renowned for his television cooking shows James Can Cook and The Occasional Cook. He was also a chef in various hotels and on cruise ships around Europe and the Mediterranean. He first travelled to Australia to indulge his love of longboard surfing in Victoria, then began a catering enterprise. When a friend undertaking media studies needed a subject for a course project, James agreed and this led to him coming to the attention of a producer then at the ABC. After several series each of shorts and episodes on that network, James was commissioned by WIN to host Alive and Cooking.

== See also ==
- List of Australian television series
- List of cooking shows
- WIN Television
