= WIN Television =

Australian TV network

- Country: Australia
- Broadcast area: Regional Queensland, Northern NSW & Gold Coast, Southern NSW & ACT, Griffith, Regional Victoria, Mildura, Tasmania, Eastern SA, Regional WA, Darwin
- Affiliates: Nine Network; Seven Network (Griffith and Eastern SA); Network 10 (Griffith, Mildura, Eastern SA and Regional WA)
- Headquarters: Wollongong (head office); Ingleburn, Sydney (national play-out centre)

Programming
- Language: English
- Picture format: 1080i HDTV (downscaled to 16:9 576i for the SDTV feed)

Ownership
- Owner: WIN Corporation
- Sister channels: WIN HD; 9Gem; 9Go!; 9Life; GOLD

History
- Launched: 18 March 1962; 64 years ago

Links
- Website: wintv.com.au

Availability

Terrestrial
- Freeview WIN owned (virtual): 8/88
- Freeview WIN HD (virtual): 80

WIN Television is group of Australian television stations. Owned and operated by Wollongong-based WIN Corporation, its name originates from its first station, Wollongong's WIN-4.

The company's stations hold the Nine Network affiliations in Darwin, Regional Queensland, Gold Coast, Australian Capital Territory, Northern, Southern and Western New South Wales, Griffith, Regional Victoria, Mildura, Tasmania, Eastern South Australia, and Regional Western Australia. It also holds affiliations for the Seven Network and Network 10 in selected markets. WIN also produces and broadcasts weeknight half-hour local news bulletins across its Queensland, ACT, southern New South Wales, Victoria, and Tasmania markets under the WIN News branding.

== History ==
=== Early years in Wollongong ===
Television Wollongong Transmission Limited (TWT) was incorporated on 4 October 1955 by a group of local businessmen. Five years later, it was awarded a licence by the Postmaster-General's Department over a number of other groups aligned to Sydney-based stations ATN-7 and TCN-9 to broadcast to the Illawarra and South Coast regions. The new station was to broadcast on the VHF-4 frequency, using the callsign WIN (which stood for Wollongong Illawarra New South Wales), in line with other Australian call signs.

=== 1980–1999: aggregation and expansion ===
The West Magazine reporting WIN Television as the second commercial broadcaster in regional Western Australia

During this period, WIN expanded through the purchase of stations in Victoria, Queensland, and New South Wales. In 1984, WIN became the first regional television station to transmit stereophonic sound. Close links between WIN Television and the Nine Network ensured the Nine Network affiliation for southern New South Wales when aggregation occurred in March 1989. The changes meant that WIN expanded into the rest of southern New South Wales, launching new stations in Canberra, Orange, Bathurst, Dubbo, and Wagga Wagga, with new buildings and studios built in Orange, Wagga, and Canberra. Aggregation also provided the network with two additional competitors, The Prime Network and Capital Television.

In 1990, WIN purchased Queensland station Star TV, with stations in Rockhampton (RTQ) and the Darling Downs (DDQ and SDQ), just weeks before aggregation was to occur in regional Queensland. The station had already been set to become a Network 10 affiliate under its previous owners; however, WIN's links with the Nine Network enabled it to clinch the Nine Network affiliation away from QTV, which was then forced to affiliate with third-placed Network Ten with just days to go.

ENT Limited, a Launceston-based company that owned a number of television and radio stations in regional Victoria and Tasmania, was taken over by WIN in 1994. Television Victoria and TasTV were, as a result, rebranded as WIN Television. The network further expanded to Griffith in 1998, when WIN purchased MTN-9 Griffith and its supplementary station AMN-31 from its local owners. As MTN had been affiliated with WIN since the early 1990s, the station was easily integrated into the network.

WIN became regional Western Australia's second commercial television network on 26 March 1999 after winning the rights tender in 1997. Prior to the launch of the new station, GWN held a commercial monopoly on the market. GWN became an affiliate of the Seven Network, while WIN took a combination of Nine Network and Network Ten programming. Despite Nine's traditional ratings dominance throughout most of the country, incumbent GWN has remained the market's most-watched station. The second ratings survey of 2006 placed WIN Television with a 34.7% commercial audience share in prime-time, compared to the Golden West Network with 65.3%.

Also in 1999, WIN purchased two stations in South Australia: SES-8 in Mount Gambier and RTS-5a in the Riverland region. They became known as WIN SA. In 2002, supplementary licences were granted under Section 38A of the Broadcasting Services Act, allowing the network to launch a WIN Ten service using the MGS call sign in Mount Gambier and LRS in the Riverland. This enabled the main SES/RTS station to be a sole Nine Network affiliate, which lasted until 2007, when a supply agreement was made with Seven.

As well as the flagship weeknightly WIN News bulletin, WIN has been prolific in broadcasting relevant programmes for its audience. In the past, it produced current affairs programming, including the community affairs programme Roving Eye, and Sunday Review, a weekly review of international, national, and local stories. It produced a mid-week rugby league wrap panel show in the mid-1990s, while in 1995, WIN Television Queensland produced its own rugby league coverage by televising games featuring the fledgeling North Queensland Cowboys in their maiden ARL Winfield Cup competition season.

=== 2000–2016: Nine affiliation ===
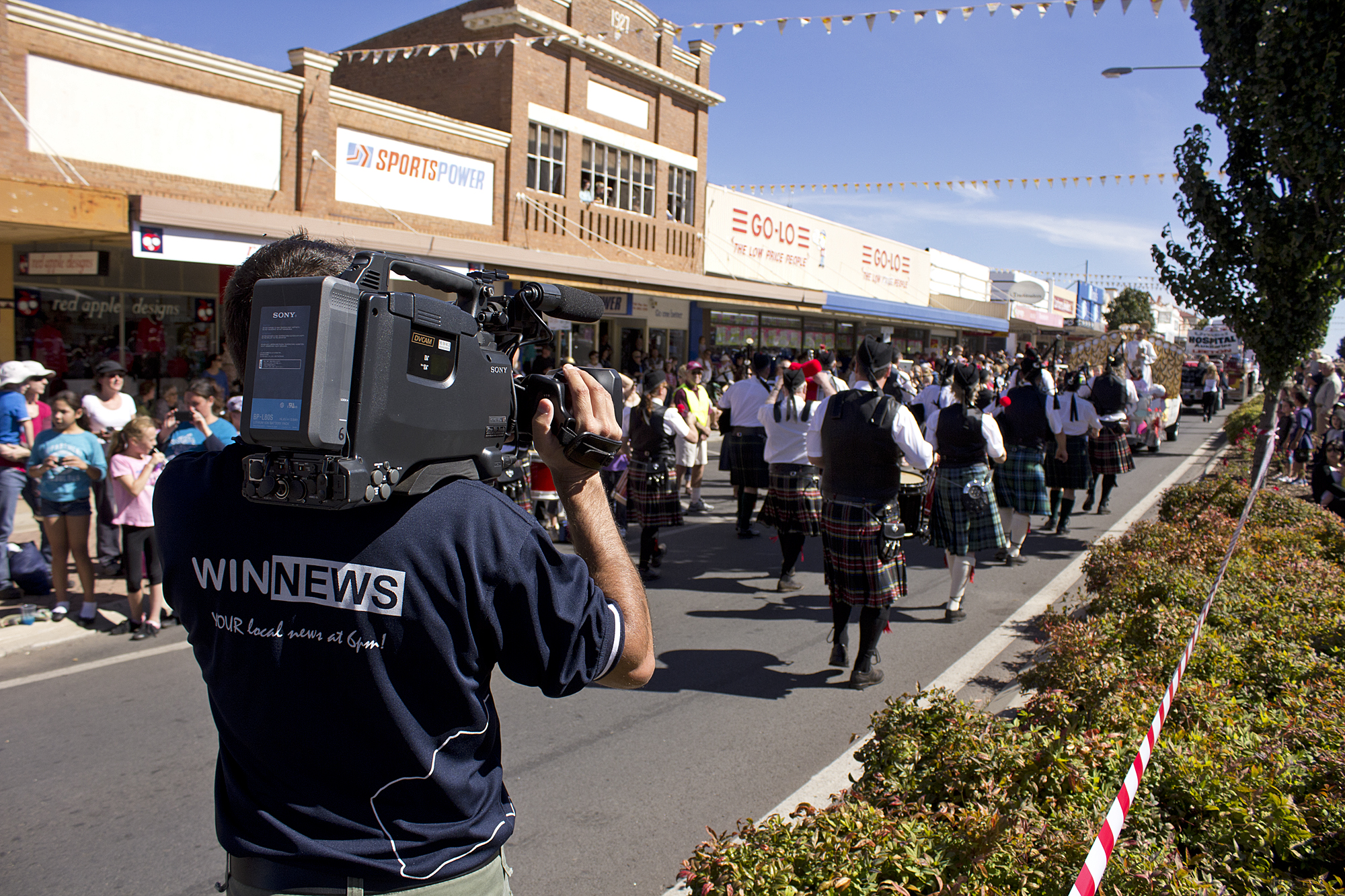
A camera operator for WIN News Riverina

WIN Television began to introduce digital television soon after it became available to metropolitan areas in January 2001. Under Section 38A of the Broadcasting Services Act, the network was able to introduce, in partnership with other stations, additional digital-only Network Ten affiliates. These included Tasmania's TDT, launched in late 2003 in partnership with Southern Cross Broadcasting, and Mildura's MDV in January 2006, with Prime Television.

On 30 May 2007, WIN purchased NWS from Southern Cross Broadcasting for A$105 million. Similarly, STW Perth, owned by Sunraysia Television and affiliated with the Nine Network, was purchased on 8 June 2007 for A$163.1 million.

Despite the station's ownership of Nine Perth, the regional WIN WA service continued to broadcast Ten News Perth, produced for and shown on rival Perth station Ten Perth, until 27 August 2007, when Ten West came into service.

A conflict between WIN and its long-time metropolitan partner, the Nine Network, arose in mid-2007, with PBL Media, Nine's parent company, requesting 40 percent of the network's advertising revenue in return for programme supply. WIN's owner, WIN Corporation, rejected this offer, expecting to pay only 29% (a 3% decrease from the previous contract and in line with many of the network's competitors, such as Prime Television and Southern Cross Ten). The network's owner, Bruce Gordon, subsequently threatened to sever the network's affiliation after negotiations stagnated, stating that his previous position at Paramount Pictures meant he could programme the network independently. On 16 August 2007, WIN Television dropped key Nine Network programmes from its daytime television schedule, including Mornings with Kerri-Anne and National Nine News: Morning Edition. WIN also secured a new programme supply agreement for its regional South Australian station with Nine's rival Seven Network. Announced on 4 September 2007, the new programme schedule included a mixture of Seven and existing WIN programming, commencing on 1 October 2007. WIN also started producing some local Australian programmes to replace key Nine content, including Alive and Cooking and Susie, and acquired the American talk show The Ellen DeGeneres Show. WIN also produced Fishing Australia as part of its local content output on the WIN Network. Two years later, WIN officially reinstated its supply of Nine content to regional South Australia with a new supplementary channel, WIN SA, relaying NWS from Adelaide.

On 9 August 2009, WIN began transmission of the new digital channel GO! on channel 88 in Southern NSW, Regional Victoria, Tasmania, and Regional Queensland. It soon reached Mildura in 2010 and regional SA in 2011.

In June 2010, playout was moved from WIN's Wollongong headquarters to its new Media Hub facility in the south-west Sydney suburb of Ingleburn, co-owned with ABC Television.

On 26 September 2010, WIN began transmission of the HD digital channel GEM on channel 80 in Southern NSW, Regional Victoria, Tasmania, and Regional Queensland.

On 1 May 2012, WIN began transmission of an SD digital infomercial channel, Gold, on channel 84. The second infomercial channel, Gold2, began on 13 July 2013 as a five-hour timeshift of Gold.

Following Nine's launch of 9HD and 9Life on 26 November 2015 and WIN's promise of following suit, WIN began broadcasting a "coming soon" test pattern on channels 85 and 86 on 10 February 2016. Both channels began broadcasting on 1 March 2016. As a result, their channel listing was reshuffled to match Nine's metropolitan with 9Gem on channel 82, 9Go! on channel 83, 9Life on channel 84, Extra on channel 85, and Gold on channel 86.

The network continued to produce its own local news service, WIN News, for most of its markets throughout its Nine affiliation, although requests for increased revenue by Nine repeatedly threatened the news division's viability. By 2016, only twelve bulletins were being produced and presented.

=== 2016–2021: 10 affiliation ===
After Nine launched its new online catch-up video on demand and live streaming service 9Now on 27 January 2016, WIN filed a lawsuit against Nine, claiming that live streaming into regional areas breached their exclusive affiliation agreement. Justice Hammerschlag of the NSW Supreme Court dismissed the case on 28 April 2016, ruling that the definition of "broadcasting" in WIN's affiliation agreement with the Nine Network did not cover internet streaming "and that Nine is under no express or implied obligation not to do it".

Shortly after WIN's legal defeat, Nine announced a new $500 million, five-year programme supply agreement with Southern Cross Austereo, the Ten affiliate. This saw Southern Cross Austereo's stations in Southern NSW, the ACT, and regional areas in Victoria and Queensland switch to Nine affiliation at midnight on 1 July 2016. With that announcement, WIN was effectively stripped of its 27-year partnership with Nine. In response, WIN entered affiliation talks with Network Ten, in which Gordon held a significant stake, reaching a final agreement on 23 May 2016. From 1 July 2016, WIN carried Ten programming into its regional Queensland, Southern NSW, Victoria, Tasmania, South Australia, and Western Australia markets. Supplementary station deals were left until late due to disagreement over the rate that loss-making stations should make to Nine Network. With just days left, deals were secured for South Australia, Griffith, and Tasmania. However, no deal was secured for the Western Australia joint venture West Digital Television before 1 July, but a deal was later finalised on 2 July 2016, with the relay of Nine content commencing that night. The channel changes reshuffled WIN's LCN listing, with One on LCNs 81 and 86, Eleven on LCN 82, TVSN on LCN 84, and Gold on LCN 85. WIN and WIN HD remained on LCNs 8 and 80. WIN also relocated its SD simulcast from LCN 81 to LCN 88.

Negotiations in January 2017 for WIN to acquire Northern New South Wales station NRN in exchange for WIN's Wollongong radio station i98FM with Southern Cross Austereo failed, although a deal was secured on 28 March 2017 for the sole sale of NRN to WIN for $55 million. The sale took effect on 31 May 2017; NRN was rebranded as WIN on 1 September 2017, with playout and transmission transferred to WIN, while the LCNs were reshuffled to align with WIN's other stations, although they stayed as 5-numbered due to 8-numbering already held by Nine-owned NBN Television for Northern NSW.

On 28 May 2018, WIN announced a new programme supply agreement with the Australian News Channel to carry Sky News Australia content on a new free-to-air channel, Sky News on WIN, which launched on 2 September 2018. The channel consisted of mixed Sky News and Fox Sports News programming, along with WIN's All Australian News, while Sky programmes gained access to WIN's regional news stories.

WIN converted TVSN to MPEG-4 SD on 30 August 2018, two days before the launch of Sky News on WIN.

On 31 October 2018, at 6:30pm, during The Project, WIN updated its logo, launching at the same time as the launch of Network 10's new logo. WIN also rebranded its versions of 10's multi-channels, One and Eleven, into WIN Boss (later changed to WIN Bold in December) and WIN Peach.

On 29 March 2021, the WIN channel in the Illawarra region was converted to MPEG-4 HD as an experiment for other WIN areas. On 14 May 2021, it was reverted to the MPEG-2 format in SD after viewers complained that they could no longer get the WIN channel on LCN 8.

=== 2021–present: Return to Nine affiliation ===
On 12 March 2021, Nine announced it had secured a new programme supply agreement with its original partner, WIN Network, across regional Australia beginning 1 July 2021, in effect dumping Southern Cross Austereo, which was forced to return to relaying third-placed Ten content. The seven-year deal sees WIN pay around 50 percent of broadcast advertising revenue to Nine Entertainment Co., plus advertising time for Nine's properties on WIN's television and radio assets. WIN also integrated advertising sales services for Nine's O&O regional stations, NBN, and NTD. Nine CEO Hugh Marks explained that "while our relationship with Southern Cross has been strong over the last five years, the opportunities presented by the WIN Network to both extend the reach of Nine's premium content into more regional markets under one agreement and to work cooperatively with them on a national and local news operation mean this is the right time for us to return to WIN". Also for the first time, WIN now broadcasts Nine content under Nine branding. WIN's multi-channels have again been rearranged, with 9Gem on channel 81, 9Go! on channel 82, and 9Life on channel 83, while TVSN and Gold would continue to broadcast on channels 84 and 85, but despite the return, the "nine dots" were not reinstated on the network logo. WIN still broadcasts Network 10 content on its northern New South Wales station.

On 18 March 2022, WIN Television celebrated 60 years of broadcasting across Wollongong and the Illawarra.

On 16 June 2022, WIN Television converted Nine's multichannels 9Gem and 9Go! to MPEG-4 SD in Tasmania via WIN's Tasmanian station TVT.

On 22 March 2023, WIN Television announced that they would be converting all of their remaining MPEG-2 channels to MPEG-4 later that same year. On 22 May 2023, 9Gem was converted into an MPEG-4 SD channel in most WIN areas, except Tasmania, Western Australia, and Northern NSW. On 19 June 2023, 9Go! was converted into an MPEG-4 SD channel in most WIN areas, except Tasmania, Western Australia, and Northern NSW. In most WIN areas, except Northern NSW and Western Australia, 9Gem was upgraded to an MPEG-4 HD channel on 27 July 2023. In Northern NSW, WIN upgraded 10 Bold and 10 Peach from MPEG-2 to MPEG-4 in November 2023, 10 Bold on 21 November 2023, and 10 Peach on 28 November 2023. On 6 December 2023, 9Go! was converted into an MPEG-4 HD channel in most WIN areas, except Western Australia, and Northern NSW.

On 13 February 2025, Network 10 announced they would be acquiring the NRN station in Northern NSW and the Gold Coast from WIN Television. This followed Network 10's announcement that they would also be acquiring Southern Cross Austereo's 10-affiliated stations in December 2024. The sale was completed on 1 May 2025.

In January 2026, it was announced that WIN would acquire NBN from Nine Entertainment. The following month, WIN also announced that it would acquire NTD, expanding its broadcast operations into the Northern Territory. Both stations will remain affiliated with Nine. In October 2026, WIN announced that Network 10 programming would be removed from WIN transmitters in Griffith and eastern South Australia on 9 October, stating that the relays were "no longer viable".

== Programming ==
WIN Television carries the programming of all three commercial television stations in Australia. It is a sole affiliate of the Nine Network in all broadcast areas, but it is also an affiliate of the Seven Network in Griffith, New South Wales, and eastern South Australia and is an affiliate of Network 10 in Griffith and eastern South Australia as well as an affiliate of Network 10 as a joint-venture station in Tasmania and regional Western Australia. WIN Television has always produced regional programming, including the flagship local news service WIN News, that supplements programmes sourced from affiliates.

Since its inception, the network has produced and broadcast notable programmes, including Sportsview and Sportsworld, a review of international, national, and local sporting events. From the first week of transmissions, the children's television series The Channel 4 Club was produced, with the children's television programme Stopwatch beginning in 1979. The English-language educational programme You Say the Word began in 1971, catering to non-English-speaking immigrants. The long-running entertainment programme Variety Italian Style premiered in 1974, with Malcom Elliott initially hosting the short-lived Tonight Show in 1981 before being replaced by John Tingle a year later. To commemorate WIN Television's 21st year of broadcasting, a one-and-a-half-hour retrospective montage special was produced in 1983. WIN Television also co-produced the telemovie Last Chance in 1986 with a Canadian television production company. Spanning close to a decade, the children's television series Goodsports was produced by WIN Television from 1991 to 2000.

WIN Television's current Australian programming productions consist of television shows including Fishing Australia and Alive and Cooking. On 17 May 2007, WIN Television announced a new midday programme called Susie; however, this was subsequently moved to a morning timeslot. It lasted until 2009.

Since 2021, most of WIN's programming has been in pattern with Nine's national schedule, with local programming limited to half-hour WIN News bulletins for its Nine stations in Regional Queensland, the ACT, Southern New South Wales, Griffith, Regional Victoria, and Tasmania.

=== News and current affairs ===
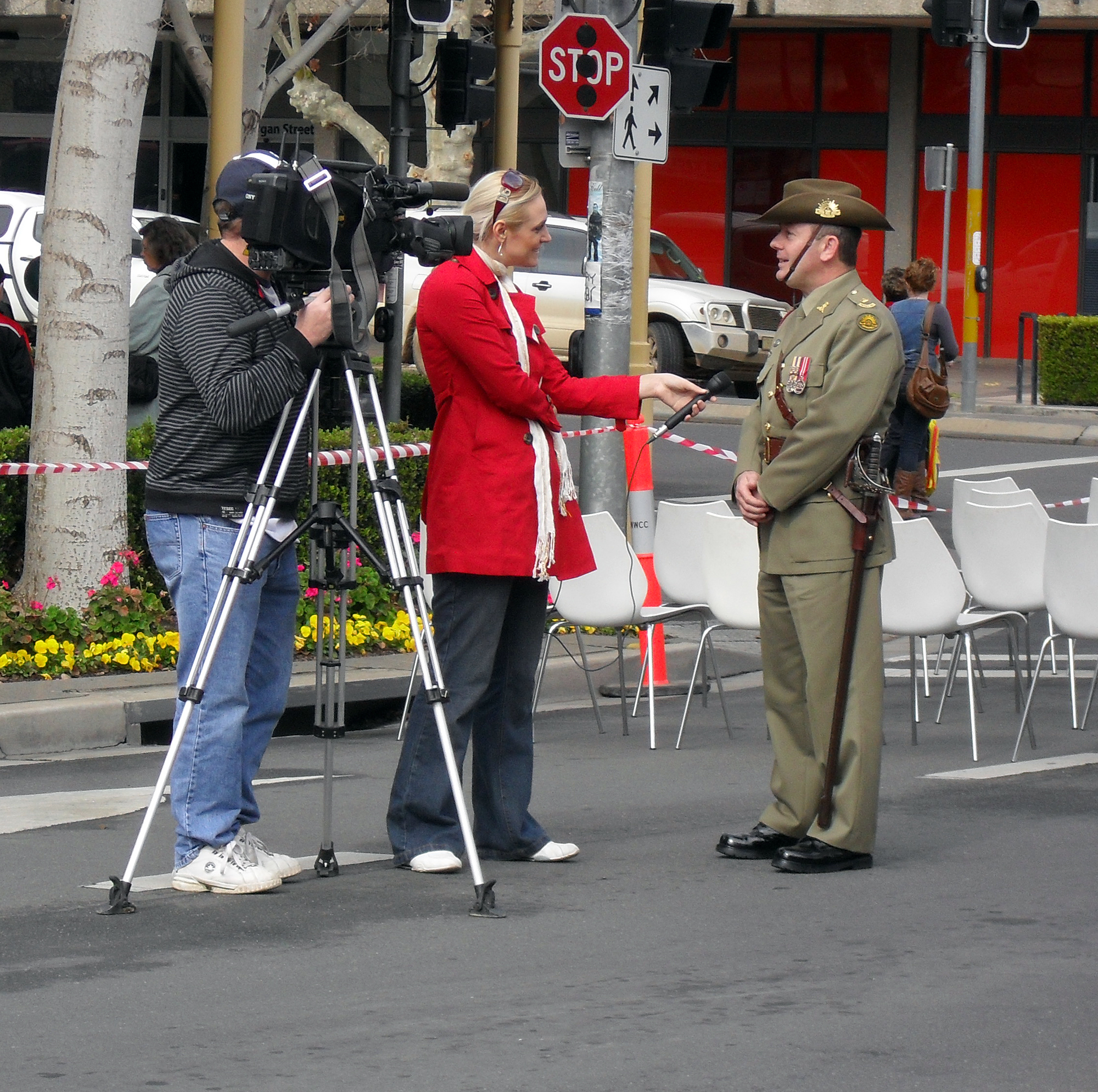
WIN News Riverina reporter, Erin Willing interviewing Major Jeff Cocks

WIN News is the network's local news service. Fourteen regional bulletins and news updates are presented from studios in Wollongong, with reporters and camera crews based in district newsrooms. In most markets, WIN News competes with Seven News.

WIN has produced independent news reports and bulletins since 1962 for its original Wollongong station. As well as the flagship nightly bulletin, WIN Television has in the past produced current affairs programming, including the community affairs programme Roving Eye, and Sunday Review, a weekly review of international, national, and local stories.

WIN also broadcast WIN's All Australian News at 7am weekdays and weeknights at late nights, which featured highlights from news bulletins from its regional stations. It was axed in June 2021, following Nine's new affiliation agreement with WIN.

=== Sport ===
On WIN's Nine-affiliated stations in Southern NSW, Griffith, Regional Queensland, Regional Victoria, Mildura, Tasmania, Eastern SA and Regional WA, it relays sports coverage broadcast from Nine's Wide World of Sports. On WIN's 10-affiliated stations in Griffith, Mildura, Regional WA, and Eastern SA, it relays sports coverage provided by 10 Sport. The Seven-affiliated stations in Griffith, Mount Gambier, and the Riverland carry Seven Sport sports coverage.

== Availability ==
WIN Television's transmissions are available from both free-to-air terrestrial transmitters in major regional centres and free-to-view satellite transmissions across regional and remote Western Australia on the Viewer Access Satellite Television service. WIN News bulletins are carried on the VAST service to allow viewers in remote areas of Central and Eastern Australia, as well as terrestrial reception blackspots, to obtain news local to their area.

Subscription cable is also provided by TransACT in the Australian Capital Territory and Neighbourhood Cable in Ballarat and Mildura.

WIN broadcasts to a geographically large portion of regional and remote Australia through owned-and-operated stations including NTD Darwin, RTQ Queensland, NBN Northern New South Wales & Gold Coast, WIN Southern New South Wales & ACT, VTV Victoria, TVT Tasmania, MTN Griffith, STV Mildura, SES Mount Gambier, RTS Riverland, and WOW Western Australia.

WIN Network service areas
Licence area	Affiliation	Call sign
Darwin	Nine Network	NTD
Northern New South Wales; Gold Coast	Nine Network	NBN
Southern New South Wales; Australian Capital Territory	Nine Network	WIN
Griffith	Seven Network	MTN
Griffith	Nine Network	AMN
Griffith	Network 10	MDN (Note: Supplementary licence owned entirely by WIN)
Regional Queensland	Nine Network	RTQ
Eastern South Australia	Seven Network	SES/RTS
Eastern South Australia	Nine Network	SDS/RDS
Eastern South Australia	Network 10	MGS/LRS
Tasmania	Nine Network	TVT
Tasmania	Network 10	TDT (Note: Supplementary licence jointly owned by WIN and Southern Cross Media Group)
Mildura	Nine Network	STV
Mildura	Network 10	MDV (Ceased transmission on 30 June 2024.) (Note: Supplementary licence jointly owned by WIN and Southern Cross Media Group)
Regional Victoria	Nine Network	VTV
Regional Western Australia	Nine Network	WOW
Regional Western Australia	Network 10	GDW, SDW, VDW, WDW (Note: Supplementary licence jointly owned by WIN and Southern Cross Media Group)

=== WIN HD ===
WIN's high-definition channel, WIN HD, originally launched on 17 March 2008 as a sister to the Nine Network's rebranded high-definition simulcast, 9HD. WIN HD broadcast in 1080i high definition and was available on WIN's regional stations, RTQ Queensland, WIN Southern New South Wales and ACT, VTV Victoria, and TVT Tasmania. The channel broadcast breakaway programming from launch until 3 August 2009, when it was turned into a straight HD simulcast. WIN HD fully ceased broadcasting on 26 September 2010 with the launch of the HD multi-channel GEM (now 9Gem).

On 10 February 2016, WIN announced that it would launch its own HD simulcast in the coming months in response to Nine Network relaunching 9HD as its second high-definition channel. WIN HD re-launched on 1 March 2016. Four WIN regions were excluded from the 1 March launch date, although in four regions the launch was delayed: Griffith, Mildura, Eastern South Australia (2 March due to technical issues), and Regional Western Australia (10 March). On 1 July 2016, with WIN's new programme supply agreement, the channel's programme schedule changed in line with WIN. The channel ceased on 30 June 2021 with WIN's new programme supply agreement with Nine. WIN now re-broadcasts 9HD across its Nine-affiliated stations.

== Logos ==
30 January 2006 – 14 January 2008

14 January 2008 – present

1 July 2016 – 31 October 2018
