= Noel Brunning =

Australian television presenter

Noel Brunning is an Australian television presenter, currently working as the main anchor of Seven News Regional WA (formerly GWN7 News and Golden West News) on Seven (formerly GWN7 and the Golden West Network) in regional Western Australia.

Brunning joined GWN in 1986, and rose through the ranks until he became the main presenter on GWN News (which is now Seven News Regional WA) in 1998. In 2007, he went on long service leave to stand as a conservative independent candidate for the Forrest constituency in the Federal election.

His candidacy was unsuccessful and Brunning returned to GWN shortly after the election to resume his role as main anchor of Seven News Regional WA.

During his election campaign, there was a local promotional movement involving T-shirts depicting Brunning's face, and various humorous slogans.
