= Fishing Australia =

- Former Fishing Australia title card
- Genre: Fishing
- Presented by: Rob Paxevanos
- Country of origin: Australia
- Original language: English

Production
- Running time: 30 minutes

Original release
- Network: WIN Television
- Release: 2001 – present

Fishing Australia is an Australian fishing television program, produced by WIN Television. The program premiered in 2001 and is broadcast on weekends on WIN Television.

Fishing Australia travels around Australia, fishing for different species of fish in unique locations. The show also features special guests ranging from iconic Australians, television and media personalities through to local fishing guides and identities. It is hosted by professional fishing guide, writer, photographer and television presenter, Rob Paxevanos.

== See also ==
- WIN Television
