= Goodsports =

1990s Australian children's TV series

- Final Intertitle
- Genre: Children's
- Country of origin: Australia
- Original language: English
- No. of seasons: 10

Production
- Production locations: Hobart, Tasmania
- Running time: 30 minutes

Original release
- Network: WIN Television
- Release: 1991 – 2000

Goodsports is an Australian children's television series, produced by WIN Television in Hobart, Tasmania. The half-hour show premiered in 1991, and was broadcast on WIN Television each Saturday morning at 7:30am, and 9:30am nationally on the Nine Network. Despite being axed in 2000, WIN Television continued to air repeats of Goodsports at 3:30pm weekdays until 2007.

== Overview ==
Goodsports is directed to children between the ages of seven and 13. Executive produced by Phil Wallbank, the show was preceded by the magazine show KTV. Wallbank said he "saw it as a continuation of KTV", which had run for three series and 360 episodes. The show features interviews of children who discuss sports' different features with the presenters. Another part of the show focuses on healthcare such as discussing the children's lunchtime meals.

The show was presented by Kelly Pummeroy, Kylie Smith, Daniel Thompson, Rachel Wilkins, Kos Karydis, Czarina Howells and Samantha Meyer. The six presenters each were about 20 years old and were members of Australian Sports Commission's Aussie Sportsfun, a school initiative. The Age's Jim Schembri praised the presenters for being "sprightly, sporty and frighteningly articulate". Carolyne Randoe was a producer and presenter for parts of the programme. The Sunday Tasmanian in 2014 cited Goodsports and KTV as being WIN Television shows produced locally that achieved "national and international success".

== Reception ==
In The Age, Margaret Geddes praised the show's premiere episode, writing that it "worked well: nothing too exciting, but fast-moving, informative, encouraging. Enthusiasts are always interesting when they get going, and young sports enthusiasts are no different. The young gymnasts were terrific. So was the martial arts exponent." The Sydney Morning Herald's Peter Holmes lauded the show, stating "in the scripting at least, Goodsports is quality stuff".
