= ABN (TV station) =

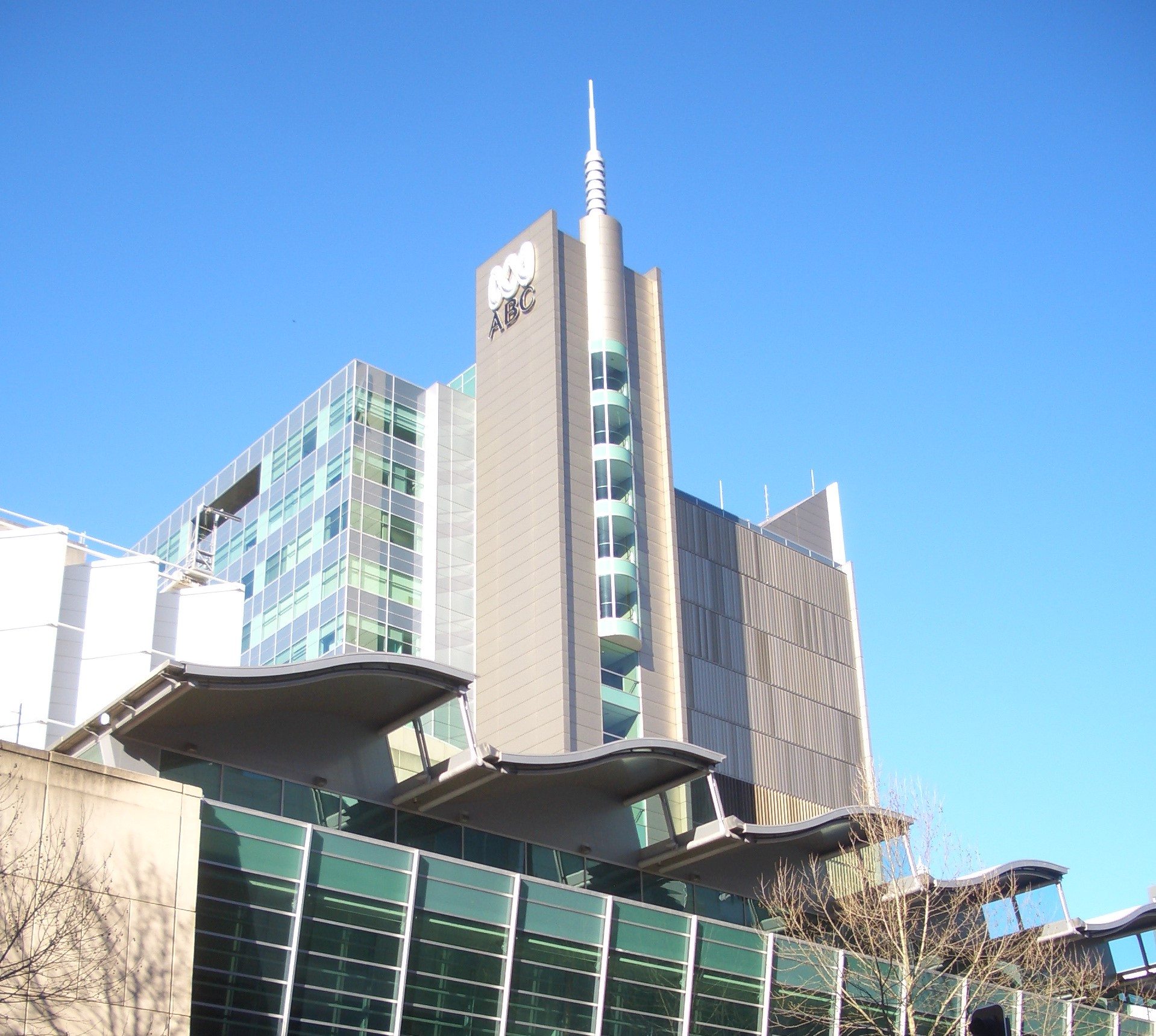
- Sydney, New South Wales; Australia
- Channels: Digital: 12 (VHF); Virtual: 2

Programming
- Language: English
- Affiliations: ABC Television

Ownership
- Owner: Australian Broadcasting Corporation

History
- First air date: 5 November 1956
- Former channel numbers: Analogue: 2 (VHF, 1956–2013)
- Call sign meaning: ABC/New South Wales

Technical information
- Licensing authority: Australian Communications and Media Authority
- ERP: 50 kW
- HAAT: 205 m (Note: HAAT estimated from http://www.itu.int/SRTM3/ using EHAAT.)
- Transmitter coordinates: 33°49′12″S 151°11′6″E

ABC Television in New South Wales comprises national and local programming on the ABC television network in the Australian state of New South Wales, headquartered in Sydney.

ABN or ABN-2 was the historic call sign of the Australian Broadcasting Corporation's television station in Sydney. The station began broadcasting on 5 November 1956 as the second television station in New South Wales and Sydney. Its original studios were located in Gore Hill and were in use up until March 2004, when they were co-located with ABC Radio, Radio Australia, ABC-TV Set Construction and ABC Australia at the Corporation's headquarters in the inner city suburb of Ultimo. Its main transmitter, however, remains at Gore Hill. The station can be received throughout the state through a number of relay transmitters, as well as domestic satellite transmission on the Viewer Access Satellite Television (formerly Optus Aurora) platform.

== History ==
The first national public television station in Australia opened in Sydney at 7:00pm on 5 November 1956 under the call sign ABN-2. It was opened by Prime Minister of Australia Robert Menzies, with the first television broadcast presented by Michael Charlton, and James Dibble reading the first television news bulletin with full-time colour broadcasting introduced in March 1975.

For more than 40 years, Gore Hill was best known as the location of the ABC's Sydney television studios, which were fully opened in 1958 and which operated until 2002, when the site was closed and sold off. Later, the ABC moved its television operations to its broadcasting centre in Ultimo.

The station has also carried a number of programs originally produced at Channel 31 stations in other states (programs such as Aurora Community Channel and National Indigenous Television.

ABN commenced digital television transmission in January 2001, broadcasting on VHF Channel 12 while maintaining analogue transmission on VHF Channel 2.

The analogue television signal for Sydney, Gosford and surrounding areas was shut off at 9.00am on 3 December 2013.

In December 2024, the 7pm ABC News bulletin moved from Ultimo to the Corporation's new studios in Parramatta.

== Programming ==
=== Local programming ===
ABN's schedule is similar to the national ABC schedule, with the exception of some news, current affairs, sport and occasionally, election programming.

ABC News New South Wales is presented by Jeremy Fernandez (Sunday–Thursday) and Lydia Feng (Friday–Saturday). The weeknight bulletins also incorporate NSW weather forecasts presented by Tom Saunders as well as a national finance segment presented by David Chau.

== Coverage area ==
While ABN broadcast state-wide, some parts of New South Wales receive other state and territory TV stations rather than ABN:

- Queanbeyan, Cooma, Goulburn and Yass receive ABC in Canberra.
- Tweed Heads receive ABQ in Brisbane.
- Albury receive ABV in Melbourne.

Although Broken Hill, unlike the rest of New South Wales, is on Central Time. Broken Hill's television transmitter relay's ABC channels from Sydney, so all programming is a half-hour earlier than advertised.

== Digital multiplex ==
LCN	Service	SD/HD
2 & 21	ABC TV	SD
20	ABC TV HD	HD
22	ABC Kids/Family	SD
23	ABC Entertains	HD
24	ABC News	HD

== Relay stations ==
The following stations relay ABN throughout New South Wales:

Call	Region served	City	Channels (Analog/ digital)	First air date	3rd letter's meaning	ERP (Analog/ digital)	HAAT (Analog/ digital)	Transmitter coordinates	Transmitter location
ABCN	Central Tablelands	Orange	1 (VHF) (Note: Analogue transmission ceased as of 5 June 2012 as part of the national shutdown of analogue television); 36 (UHF)	31 March 1964	Central Tablelands	160 kW; 570 kW	655 m 677 m	33°20′32″S 148°59′1″E	Mount Canobolas
ABDN	Grafton/Kempsey	Coffs Harbour	2 (VHF) (Note: Analogue transmission ceased as of 27 November 2012 as part of the national shutdown of analogue television.); 36 (UHF)	28 June 1965	Dorrigo	160 kW; 250 kW	661 m 730 m	30°19′2″S 152°51′35″E	Mount Moombil
ABGN	Murrumbidgee Irrigation Area	Griffith	7 (VHF); 11 (VHF)	25 July 1966	Griffith	200 kW; 50 kW	416 m 412 m	34°7′17″S 146°14′7″E	Mount Bingar
ABHN	Newcastle and Hunter Valley	Newcastle	5A (VHF) (Note: ABHN also broadcasts on analog UHF channel 48 with 1200 kW ERP at 441 m HAAT. ABHN was on VHF channel 5 from its 1963 sign-on until February 1977, moving to its current channel in order to accommodate FM radio.); 37 (UHF)	5 June 1963	Hunter River	200 kW; 250 kW	405 m 440 m	32°53′30″S 151°32′18″E (analog); 32°53′24″S 151°32′20″E (digital)	Mount Sugarloaf
ABLN	Broken Hill	Broken Hill	2 (VHF) (Note: Analogue transmission ceased as of 15 December 2010 as part of the national shutdown of analogue television.); 10 (VHF)	14 December 1965	Unknown	5 kW; 4 kW	95 m 104 m	31°57′5″S 141°26′26″E	Rocky Hill
ABMN	South West Slopes and Eastern Riverina	Wagga Wagga	0 (VHF); 46 (UHF)	30 April 1965	Unknown	200 kW; 600 kW	466 m 543 m	34°49′13″S 147°54′5″E	Mount Ulandra
ABMIN	Mungindi	Mungindi	10 (VHF); NA	7 January 1974	MungindI	0.1 kW	59 m	28°59′37″S 149°1′0″E	Mungindi
ABQN	Central Western Slopes	Dubbo	11 (VHF) (Note: ABQN was on VHF channel 5 from its 1966 sign-on until 1988, moving to its current channel in order to accommodate FM radio.); 12 (VHF)	12 September 1966	Unknown	400 kW; 100 kW	638 m 638 m	31°20′34″S 149°1′23″E	Mount Cenn Cruaich
ABRN	Richmond, Tweed and Northern Rivers	Lismore	6 (VHF); 29 (UHF)	20 April 1964	Richmond and Tweed	200 kW; 200 kW	621 m 645 m	28°32′44″S 153°17′15″E	Mount Nardi
ABSN	Bega, Cooma and South Coast	Bega	8 (VHF); NA	29 June 1966	South East	200 kW	428 m	36°35′53″S 149°22′58″E	Brown Mountain
ABTN	Manning River	Taree	6 (VHF) (Note: ABTN was on VHF channel 1 from its 1966 sign-on until 1990.); 7 (VHF)	29 April 1966	Taree	315 kW; 80 kW	599 m 599 m	31°42′7″S 152°40′43″E	Middle Brother
ABUN	Upper Namoi	Tamworth	7 (VHF); 8 (VHF)	27 September 1965	Upper Namoi	72 kW; 22.5 kW	859 m 849 m	30°17′4″S 150°10′2″E	Mount Dowe
ABWN	Illawarra	Wollongong	56 (UHF) (Note: ABWN was on VHF channel 5A from its 1963 sign-on until 1988.); 51 (UHF)	28 October 1963	Wollongong	960 kW; 250 kW	618 m 618 m	34°37′23″S 150°41′39″E (analog); 34°37′24″S 150°41′40″E (digital)	Knights Hill
