= Digital terrestrial television in Australia =

Digital terrestrial television in Australia commenced on 1 January 2001 in Sydney, Melbourne, Brisbane, Adelaide and Perth using DVB-T standards. The phase out of analogue PAL transmissions began on 30 June 2010 and was completed by 10 December 2013.

Digital terrestrial television brought a number of enhancements over the previous analogue television, primarily higher-quality picture and sound, as well as datacasting and multi-view services such as video program guides, high definition, and now-and-next program information. There are a number of additional channels, datacasting, as well as high definition services, available to digital terrestrial television viewers in Australia. Digital-only content is subject to availability and differs greatly in various television markets.

Although approximately 96% of the population had access to at least one digital service, take up was initially sluggish, with only 28% of Australia's 7.8 million households having adopted free-to-air digital television by March 2007. However, by August 2010, 75% of Australian households had made the switch. Analogue transmissions began to be phased out in 2010, and ceased to be available nationwide by the end of 2013.

From 2009, the free-to-air digital television platform has been promoted under the Freeview brand name.

== History ==
=== Planning ===
Planning for digital terrestrial television in Australia can be traced back to 1993, when a group of specialists was drawn from the then-Australian Broadcasting Authority, Department of Transport and Communications, in addition to broadcasters and manufacturers. The ABA Specialist Group was intended to bring together studies taking place in a number of Australian forums and investigate potential options and policies relating to digital television.

In 1995 the group released a report, Digital Terrestrial Broadcasting in Australia, containing the preliminary conclusions of the group. It found that premature regulation of the new platform might stifle the market-driven development of the service, that it should be based upon existing standards, and should not restrict the ability of broadcasters to tailor local content. It was too early at the time to make decisions relating to what standard should be used, when transmissions should commence, and whether analogue television should be phased out.

The final report, of the same name, was released in 1997. It recommended that Australia should adopt a single system following detailed trials of potential systems, that it should be implemented with high definition capabilities from the outset, that each licensed commercial or public service should have access to a full 7 MHz channel for its services, and that the eventual termination of analogue PAL services should be driven by market factors and subject to regular review. The commencement of digital terrestrial broadcasts was to target before Sydney hosting the 2000 Summer Olympics.

==== Response ====
Australian LCN Allocation
Primary User	Allocated Service Numbers
Network 10 in metropolitan areas, and affiliates in Darwin and remote areas	1, 10–19, 100–149
ABC Television / ABC Radio	2, 20–29, 200–299
SBS Television / SBS Radio	3, 30–39, 300–349
Overlapping signal receiver allocation The stronger signal out of two with the same LCN will be allocated the original LCN, while the weaker signal will be moved to these service numbers.	350–399
Community local television/radio and VAST Regional News (VAST Regional News excludes 40–49)	4, 40–49, 400–499
Network 10 and affiliates in regional areas	5, 50–59, 550–599
Seven Network and affiliates in regional areas	6, 60–69, 650–699
VAST service television/radio	600–649, 900–949
Seven Network in metropolitan areas, Darwin and remote areas	7, 70–79, 750–799
WIN Television and other regional Nine Network affiliates	8, 80–89, 850–899
Nine Network in metropolitan areas, and affiliates in Darwin and remote Imparja Television	9, 90–99, 950–999
Unallocated	150–199, 500–549, 700–749, 800–849
Note: Prior to the affiliation swap between Southern Cross Austereo and WIN Television in July 2016, and after the affiliation swap in July 2021, LCNs 8, 80–89, 850–899 were and are used by all regional Nine Network affiliates and LCNs 5, 50–59, 550–599 by all regional Network 10 affiliates.
Note: Prior to the affiliation swap between Southern Cross Austereo and WIN Television in July 2021, LCNs 5, 50–59, 550–599 were used by most regional Nine Network affiliates, LCNs 5, 50–59, 550–599 by some regional Network 10 affiliates, LCNs 8, 80–89, 850–899 by most regional Network 10 affiliates and LCNs 8, 80–89, 850–899 by some regional Nine Network affiliates.

The Australian Broadcasting Authority's response, titled Digital Terrestrial Television Broadcasting, recommended that the Australian Government support the early introduction of digital broadcasting as a free-to-air service with the loan of a 7 MHz channel for each broadcaster, in order to enable high-definition television from the outset. The Federation of Australian Commercial Television Stations supported this, as well as freedom for its members to launch multi-channel services. At the same time, the Australian Subscription Television and Radio Association, questioned the commercial viability of HDTV, was opposed to the idea of multi-channeling, and argued for a competitive system that would allow the entry of new players.

The Australian Broadcasting Corporation stated that it wished to run up to four multichannels at different times of the day or alternatively offer an HDTV service. It claimed that up to $100 million would be needed to prepare for these services, half of which would need to be government-funded. Other interested parties, such as internet service provider OzEmail argued for the provision of spectrum for interactive services, while Telstra, shareholder in the subscription television provider Foxtel, supported ASTRA's argument for a competitive bidding process for digital spectrum.

=== Legislation ===
On 24 March 1998, Minister for Communications, the Information Economy and the Arts, Senator Richard Alston, announced the government's decisions for the introduction of digital television. The plan allowed commercial and public broadcasters 7 MHz of spectrum free of charge for 8 years to simulcast services in both digital and analogue, after which it was to be returned to the Commonwealth. Digital terrestrial television was to commence on 1 May 2000 to coincide with the Olympics, however it was later postponed to the celebration of Australia's centenary of federation on 1 January 2001 in metropolitan areas, with expansion to regional areas to have been completed by the start of 2004.

Following this, commercial broadcasters would be required to provide minimum levels of high-definition content, would be required to pay fees if they chose to provide datacast services and would be prohibited from using their spectrum for multichanneling of subscription services. In addition, the prohibition on new free-to-air broadcasters would be extended until December 2008.

Amendments were subsequently made to the Broadcasting Services Act 1992 and the Radiocommunications Act 1992, which set out ownership and programming conditions for broadcasting licences (administered by the ABA) and regulated the usage of spectrum, respectively.

On 18 June 1998, the Digital Terrestrial Television Broadcasting Selection Panel announced the choice of the European DVB-T system for digital terrestrial television. The panel was a group of representatives from the country's public, commercial and regional broadcasters, the Department of Communications, the Information Economy and the Arts, as well as the Australian Broadcasting Authority.

=== Launch ===
When digital television launched on 1 January 2001, the majority of households did not know of or were unable to buy a set top box in order to receive the signal. Digital Broadcasting Australia was established in late 2000 to help make the transition to digital television as seamless for consumers as possible. It included representatives from free-to-air broadcasters, manufacturers, suppliers, and retailers and was intended to provide information about commencement dates, coverage, and the functionality and availability of equipment.

== Content ==
=== Additional channels ===
The Australian Broadcasting Corporation launched ABC Kids and Fly TV channel in August 2001. The two multichannels, available only through digital means, showed a range of programming targeted at children and teenage viewers. Similarly, the Special Broadcasting Service launched the SBS World News Channel in 2002, a digital-only service offering a number of foreign-language news programmes seen in its morning WorldWatch timeslot.

Funding issues meant that in May 2003 the Australian Broadcasting Corporation closed ABC Kids and Fly TV. In the same year, Tasmanian Digital Television became the first digital-only commercial station to be launched in the country, under Section 38A of the Broadcasting Services Act. The new station was a joint venture between existing commercial networks Southern Cross Broadcasting and WIN Television. Tasmanian Digital Television, affiliated to Network Ten, was initially available only in Hobart, before expanding to Launceston and, by early 2009, the remainder of the state. The introduction of this fifth channel resulted in significantly higher digital television takeup in Tasmania than other parts of the country.

ABC Family, the Australian Broadcasting Corporation's second attempt at a digital-only channel launched on 7 March 2005 as ABC2. The service showed a range of repeated news, current affairs, children's and educational programs originally shown on ABC TV (then ABC1) as well as a number of original programs launched later on, such as Australia Wide, Short and Curly and Late Night Legends.

In the other market areas where there are only 1 or 2 broadcasters, digital-only stations were created that transmit programming from the unrepresented broadcasters in that area. These digital-only stations are owned by joint-venture, or by the sole broadcaster, depending on the area.

During September 2007, the three commercial networks announced the introduction of high-definition only channels later that year, becoming the first new commercial television channels to launch in metropolitan areas of Australia since 1988. The Seven Network's 7HD was the first to launch on 15 October and became available through Prime Television (now merged with Seven) on 29 October. This was followed by the launch of 10 HD (then Ten HD) on 16 December. The majority of the programming on the high-definition channels was simulcast from the parent channel.

From 2009, commercial broadcasters were allowed to transmit an alternate standard definition channel. On 26 March 2009, Channel Ten launched 10 Drama as One HD, its SD multichannel as a 24-hour sports channel. 10 Drama (then One HD) was also broadcast on 10's only HD channel space at the time, channel 1, replacing 10 HD. On 1 June 2009, SBS was the next to launch a new channel called SBS TWO (now branded as SBS 2). Also, Nine later launched GO! (now 9Go!), as a general entertainment channel skewed towards younger viewers on 9 August 2009. Seven introduced its first catch-up channel 7TWO (now branded as 7two) on 1 November 2009 while ABC launched its first kids channel ABC3 (now ABC Entertains) on 4 December 2009.

On 22 July 2010, the ABC launched its proposed news channel, ABC News (then ABC News 24). In addition, the Seven and Nine networks launched their third channels in September 2010: 7mate from Seven and 9Gem (then GEM) from Nine. Network Ten launched their third channel, 10 Comedy, on 11 January 2011 as Eleven. SBS relaunched indigenous channel NITV on free to air on 12 December 2012.

On 17 November 2015, SBS launched a new food channel, SBS Food (formerly Food Network) while on 26 November 2015, Nine launched their fourth channel, 9Life, along with a relaunch of 9HD as well as all the channels merging with Nine. On 28 February 2016, Seven launched their fourth channel, 7flix.

On 2 March 2016, 10 relaunched their HD channel, 10 HD. On 10 May 2016, Seven relaunched their HD channel, 7HD. On 6 December 2016, the ABC relaunched their HD channel, ABC HD.

=== Amateur digital television ===
VK3RTV is an experimental Amateur Television Repeater licensed by the ACMA to Amateur Radio Victoria. In late September 2009 the former single analogue channel was converted to a 2 channel DVB-T digital system. The output of the transmitter is on 445.5 MHz which can be received on some set top boxes and digital television sets. Both channels (VK3RTV1 and VK3RTV2) are transmitted in standard definition. This repeater has been re-located from Olinda on Mt Dandenong to Mount View to the east of Melbourne.

Amateur Radio Operators are restricted in terms of the content they may transmit in that the transmission of entertainment is not allowed. However, Amateur Radio Operators are nonetheless able to transmit a wide range of educational material related to amateur radio & electronics.

=== Datacasting ===
The Digital Forty Four video program guide formerly available to digital viewers in Sydney.

A number of broadcasters, primarily commercial networks, have provided a number of digital-only datacast or multiview services on separate channels – in particular during major sporting events. The Seven Network, for instance, provided two additional channels as part of its coverage of the 2003 Rugby World Cup – one providing alternate commentary, the other with statistics and game information. Seven also ran a similar service during its coverage of the 2004 Summer Olympics showing news headlines, a medal tally, and event results. Similarly in 2005 for the Melbourne Cup, Australian Open, Australian Open Golf, and the One Day International series from the United Kingdom, the Seven Network provided a multi-view datacast service. As well as this, the Nine Network and NBN Television (now Nine Northern NSW) both provided a multi-view service with additional text information during Pompeii: The Last Day.

Digital Forty Four, a trial datacasting service, began in Sydney in 2003. The service included at launch an electronic program guide, ABC News, Sport and Weather datacast service, the Australian Christian Channel, shopping channel Expo and a number of federal parliament audio streams. The service, licensed by the Australian Communications and Media Authority, ceased broadcasting at midnight on the night of 30 April 2010.

Three metropolitan networks once provided video program guide datacast channels in addition to their standard and high definition channels. Nowadays, during ABC Kids', ABC Family's and ABC Entertains' downtime, those Australian Broadcasting Corporation channels show their channel logo and the time they are back on air, with music from ABC's radio networks, Double J and ABC Jazz.

Other channels were launched, such as TV4ME, ishop TV, Extra, Gold, TVSN, Spree TV, Aspire TV and Fresh Ideas TV.

=== High-definition ===
At a minimum, all digital television broadcasters in Australia provide a 576i standard-definition service, in addition to high definition. The 576p50 format is also considered an HDTV format, as it has higher vertical resolution through the use of progressive scanning. When Australia started DVB-T in 2001 several networks broadcast high-definition in a 576p format as this could give better quality on 50 Hz scanning CRT TVs and was not as demanding on MPEG-2-bit-rate. Since many modern television sets have an interlace to progressive scan conversion there is little difference in picture quality. MPEG-2 encoders have also improved so the more conventional 720p and 1080i formats are now used.

Currently, national public broadcasters ABC and SBS, and metropolitan commercial networks Seven, Nine and 10 have 1080i high definition services which, since 2015, simulcast their main channel from standard definition. Prior to this, HD broadcasts were shown as a multichannel providing different content from the main SD channel. In addition, most of the commercial networks' regional affiliates also carry a HD simulcast of the main SD channel.

Quotas on high definition content – a minimum of 1040 hours per year – were imposed by the Australian government in July 2003 on broadcasters in Sydney, Melbourne, Brisbane, Adelaide and Perth. The same requirement was extended in April 2005 to stations in Darwin, regional New South Wales and regional Queensland, and in January 2006 in Mildura. As of 13 July 2007 commercial television networks in Australia were permitted to provide a separate standard definition and high definition channel. As of January 2009, they were permitted 2 standard definition channels in addition to the high definition channel – the networks planned to launch these via Freeview. However, in August 2015, the government finally lifted the SD Primary Channel mandate, allowing broadcasters to simulcast their respective main channel programmes in high definition.

== Transition to digital television ==
The transition from analogue to digital television was co-ordinated by the Digital Switchover Taskforce operating under the federal Department of Broadband, Communications and the Digital Economy.

Until the switch-off in the respective areas, free-to-air broadcasts were simulcast, along with digital-only channels like ABC Family (then ABC2). Cable television networks began simulcasting in 2004 and analogue cable services were switched off in April 2007.

=== Freeview ===
In November 2008, all free-to-air broadcasters (both metropolitan and regional) joined to launch the Freeview brand name as a consistent marketing platform for digital broadcasting to compete against subscription television in Australia, with the actual Freeview service commencing in March 2009.

=== Government labelling scheme ===
In April 2009, the government released a new labelling scheme for digital television devices, to help people buy the correct equipment in the transition from analogue to digital television. Televisions had the following labels:

1. Digital TV Capable – for analogue TVs which required a set top box or a personal video recorder
2. Digital TV Ready (Standard Definition) – for TVs able to receive SD broadcasts
3. Digital TV Ready (High Definition) – for TVs able to receive HD broadcasts

The government labelling standards were in addition to the Freeview labelling standards endorsed by the major commercial and public broadcasters and which contributed to confusion between Freeview and government digital TV standards. Freeview devices had to meet the High Definition Digital TV Ready standard.

=== Controversy ===
Perth community station Access 31's closure was partially blamed on viewers and revenue lost to increasing digital television viewership. The analogue-only station had been campaigning with other community television stations for support from the Federal Government that allowed them access to the digital broadcast spectrum.

On 4 November 2009, Communications Minister Stephen Conroy approved a Digital TV only licence for West TV in Perth, which allows them to broadcast as a digital-only community television station as a replacement for the now defunct Access 31. Digital services were available in most areas, however parts of Western Australia and Central Australia had yet to begin transmissions in 2007.

=== Household assistance scheme ===
To aid the digital television switchover, households receiving government assistance payments were eligible to have a set-top-box provided free of charge to convert to digital television. In addition to set top boxes, the assistance included any necessary cabling or antenna upgrades needed to achieve a reliable digital signal.

=== Analogue switchoff timetable ===
In October 2008, the Digital Switchover Taskforce announced the timetable for the analogue switch off, as follows:

Date of shutdown	Areas affected
30 June 2010	Mildura, Victoria
15 December 2010	Rural South Australia and Broken Hill, New South Wales
5 May 2011	Rural Victoria
6 December 2011	Regional Queensland
5 June 2012	Southern New South Wales and the ACT
27 November 2012	Northern New South Wales
2 April 2013	Adelaide
9 April 2013	Tasmania
16 April 2013	Perth
28 May 2013	Brisbane and surrounds
4 June 2013	Bonnet Bay and Woronora, New South Wales
25 June 2013	Regional and remote Western Australia
30 July 2013	Darwin
3 December 2013	Sydney
10 December 2013	Melbourne and remote central and eastern Australia

== Video encoding technologies ==
Initially all Australian digital TV channels, both standard and high definition, were encoded using the relatively bandwidth-hungry MPEG-2 format. This restricted the number of channels each broadcaster could fit into its multiplex. In the late 2010s, the commercial broadcasters launched several channels using MPEG-4 encoding, which takes up less bandwidth, but is not compatible with some set top boxes sold prior to 2009. Over time all HD channels were converted to MPEG-4, leaving only SD channels using MPEG-2 for the benefit of viewers with older equipment.

The Seven Network was the first to entirely phase out 576i standard definition broadcasting using MPEG-2. Throughout 2025, it gradually switched its last two remaining MPEG-2 channels (7 and 7two) over to 1080i high definition MPEG-4. The process was completed with the switchover of signals in Melbourne on 27 February 2026.

As of 2026, Network 10 only broadcasts its main channel (10) in MPEG-2 standard definition. The ABC and SBS each have two MPEG-2 channels, while the Nine Network still makes considerable use of MPEG-2 on its multiplex.

== See also ==
- Television in Australia
- Digital television transition
- List of digital television channels in Australia
