= MTN (TV station) =

- Griffith and Murrumbidgee Irrigation Area; Australia
- Channels: Digital: MTN: 29 (UHF) MDN: 32 (UHF); Virtual: MTN: 6 MDN: 5
- Branding: MTN: Seven; MDN: 10

Programming
- Language: English
- Subchannels: See Channels below
- Affiliations: MTN: Seven Network; MDN: Network 10

Ownership
- Owner: WIN Corporation Pty Ltd; (WIN Television Griffith Pty. Ltd.)

History
- First air date: MTN: 15 December 1965; MDN: 13 January 2012
- Last air date: MDN: 9 October 2026 (14 years, 8 months and 26 days)
- Former channel numbers: Analogue: MTN: 9 Digital: MTN: 6
- Former affiliations: See table below
- Call sign meaning: Murrumbidgee; Television; New South Wales Murrumbidgee; Digital; New South Wales

Technical information
- Licensing authority: Australian Communications and Media Authority
- ERP: See table below
- HAAT: 418 m
- Transmitter coordinates: See table below

Links
- Website: www.wintv.com.au

MTN is a television station licensed to serve Griffith and the surrounding Murrumbidgee Irrigation Area (MIA). The station is owned and operated by WIN Corporation as a Seven Network affiliate.

As WIN is the sole commercial television broadcaster in the area, they also supply the stations AMN, a Nine Network affiliate, and formerly the supplementary station MDN, a Network 10 affiliate. This twinstick operation was permitted due to the broadcasting authorities considering Griffith and the MIA too small for three television companies, but large enough for a single company running two stations. The broadcast region covers approximately 39,700 square kilometres, encompassing 20 towns which include Leeton, Narrandera, Hay, Hillston and Lake Cargelligo. According to 2006 Census data, it is estimated the region has a population of 64,200.

== History ==
MTN began transmission on 15 December 1965 on channel 9. At its launch, MTN was owned by Murrumbidgee Television Limited, a publicly listed company, whose shareholders at the time included local radio station 2RG.

The costs of operating a television station in such a small market led MTN to join with CWN–6 Dubbo and CBN–8 Orange in forming the Television 6–8–9 network, in 1973. While the majority of the programming and identification came from the network, MTN did run its own news service as well as some programs of local interest and popularity, separate to the rest of the network. In March 1981, the network was rebranded as Mid State Television. Rancorp, who were the existing owners of stations RVN/AMV in Wagga Wagga and Albury, acquired Mid State Television in October 1987, and thus adding additional stations to the network. In November 1988, Mid State Television rebranded as Prime Television. During this time, regional areas were serviced by one commercial station and the ABC, and as a result, the regional commercial network hand-picked titles from the three metropolitan commercial networks to air in their region. However, this meant that regional viewers were not able to watch all of the same shows as their metropolitan counterparts. As a result, the Hawke government introduced aggregation, whereby regional stations would be grouped together and become sole-affiliates for one metropolitan station, and additional stations would launch in regional areas so that regional viewers had access to the same amount of channels as metropolitan viewers. However, the government deemed Griffith and the MIA to be too small a market for aggregation, and as a result, MTN was abandoned by Prime Television in 1989 and remained independently owned. MTN then took up an affiliation with WIN Television, who in turn was a Nine Network affiliate in southern New South Wales. While the majority of the programming was the same as WIN's, it retained its news service and aired some Seven Network programming, such as its coverage of the Australian Football League, in preference to Nine's rugby league.

In 1979, MTN was purchased from Murrumbidgee Television Limited by Henry Jones Limited. Other owners since have included The Linter Group, Broadcast Operations Group, Broadcast and Communications Limited, Lochfield Consultants, MTN Television, and Associated Media Investments.

The Australian Broadcasting Authority relaxed the rules regarding station ownership in solus markets in the mid-1990s. The changes allowed for one company to operate two stations without competition, provided the Authority did not have reason to believe another company would be interested. MTN applied for a Section 38A licence in 1995, and after being refused once, challenged the Authority, and was successful on appeal – ultimately being granted the second licence on 18 July 1996. The second channel launched on 5 October 1997, on UHF channel 31 using the callsign AMN (a variation of Victorian station AMV). It was a direct feed of Prime Television Orange, with the exception of its local news, which AMN replaced with alternative programming. Since then, AMN has changed from being a direct feed of Prime7 to being a feed of Seven Network Sydney.

WIN Corporation brought MTN and AMN from then-owner Associated Media Investments on 6 July 1998. Following the sale of the station, minor changes occurred, including MTN changing its on-air branding from MTN Television to WIN Television, and the news service rebranded as WIN News.

In 2000, the government introduced changes to the Broadcasting Services Act 1992 which allowed for two-station markets such as the MIA to be granted a third licence to be broadcast in digital-only. This change in the Act became Section 38B, and saw the region allocated a third licence on 14 June 2011. This third station, using the call sign MDN and broadcasting on channel 32, launched on 13 January 2012.

On 1 July 2016, to reflect WIN's new affiliation agreement with Network Ten, AMN and MDN swapped affiliates – with AMN becoming a Ten affiliate while MDN became a Nine affiliate.

On 1 July 2021, to reflect WIN's new affiliation agreement with Nine Network, AMN and MDN swapped affiliates – with AMN becoming a Nine affiliate while MDN became a 10 affiliate.

=== Digital television ===
In 2000, the government introduced changes to the Broadcasting Services Act 1992 which sought for all broadcasters to transmit in digital by 1 January 2004. To assist solus markets such as the MIA, the government allowed networks to multichannel the digital broadcasts, whereby the two stations are transmitted on the one channel or frequency. Digital television transmission began in the region in 2003, with both WIN and Prime broadcasting on the one channel (channel 6).

On 1 December 2010, Network Ten began broadcast into the area for the first time.

In May 2011, WIN announced that it would broadcast the multichannels of the Nine, Seven and Ten networks, including high-definition channels, by December 2011. However, WIN did not meet the deadline, despite the Minister for Communications setting a deadline of 4 December 2011 for the full suite of channels. WIN commented in December 2011 that Go!, Eleven, One and Gem would launch by the third week of January 2012. 9Go!, 9Gem, Eleven and One began broadcasting on 13 January 2012.

At first, interference from the analogue signals caused issues with some channels, mainly Network Ten channels, which meant a duplicate service of Ten and WIN was provided (on LCN 51 and 81 respectively) and ceased on the day of the switch over. Ultimately, the duplicate channels were replaced by the Seven Network's multi-channels 7TWO and 7mate. 7mate launched on 20 April 2012, replacing WIN's duplication on LCN 81; and 7TWO launched on 5 June 2012, the day of the analogue switchoff, replacing the TEN duplication on LCN 51.

Gold, a datacasting channel, began broadcasting in the region on 8 May 2012.

As part of Australia's digital transition, MTN and AMN ceased broadcasting in analogue on 5 June 2012. As part of the transition, MTN changed from broadcasting on channel 6 to channel 29.

On 13 July 2013, WIN launched datacasting channel Gold 2 – a five-hour timeshift of existing datacasting channel Gold – on channel 82.

On 2 March 2016 (one day later than planned), WIN began broadcasting WIN HD and 9Life in the region. However, unlike existing digital channels, these two channels are broadcast in MPEG-4 as opposed to MPEG-2.

On 21 January 2016, WIN replaced datacasting channel Gold 2 with the Nine Network owned datacasting channel Extra.

As a result of the 2016 affiliate changes, WIN – in addition to its high definition simulcast – swapped its stations from airing Nine Network programming to Network Ten programming. WIN remained in the 8/80's channel range, but as the new Ten affiliate. Meanwhile, WIN's former affiliate, Nine, had its primary channel, 9Go!, and 9Gem moved to the 5/50's channel range. As a consequence, 9Life ceased to be available in the region, and Extra was replaced with Network Ten datacasting channel TVSN.

=== Affiliate troubles and MDN shutdown ===
On 30 June 2024, WIN ended their advertising agreement with the Seven Network, ending the ability for local advertisers to book advertising on Seven Griffith through WIN. Since 1 July 2024, the station has been a full-time dirty feed of ATN-7 Sydney complete with Sydney commercials. AMN (Nine) and MDN (10) continue to insert local commercials into their ad breaks.

On 15 June 2025, WIN Television was unable to reach an agreement with the Seven Network to continue providing Seven channels in the Griffith and Murrumbidgee Irrigation Area regions, and the Mount Gambier and Riverland regions in South Australia. On 16 June 2025, WIN Television announced that they would cease broadcasting Seven Network programming into these areas beginning 1 July 2025. The Seven Network was back on air on 3 July 2025 after a new broadcast deal with WIN Television.

The following year, on 18 May 2026, it was announced that MDN and sister 10 affiliate MGS/LRS in Mount Gambier and the Riverland would cease broadcasting from 1 July 2026 due to similar financial pressures of continuing services in smaller television markets. Days before the deadline, WIN and Network 10 agreed to a temporary three-month deal where Network 10 would provide their programming for free until 30 September, with both continuing to explore options going forward. On 2 October, WIN announced that continuing to supply programming to these areas beyond the temporary supply deal was not commercially viable, and would cease broadcasting Network 10 content on 9 October.

== Programming ==
AMN carries programming from Nine Network, which includes the Nine News Sydney bulletin as well as the amalgamated Wagga Wagga and MIA WIN News bulletin. The station also carries the Sydney feeds of 9Gem, 9Go! and 9Life. MTN carries programming from Seven Network, which includes the Seven News Sydney bulletin. The station also carries the Sydney feeds of 7two and 7mate. MDN carries programming from Network 10, which includes the 10 News First Sydney bulletin. The station also carries the Sydney feeds of 10 Drama and 10 Comedy.

== Station details ==
The following transmitter details are correct as of January 2016.

Call sign	First air date	Current affiliate	Former affiliate(s)	Channel	ERP	Transmitter coordinates	Transmitter location
MTN	15 December 1965	Seven Network	Prime Television (1973–1989); Nine Network (1989–2012)	29 (UHF)	200 kW	34°7′23″S 146°14′1″E	Mount Bingar
AMN	5 October 1997	Nine Network	Seven Network (1997–2012); Nine Network (2012–2016, 2021–present); Network 10 (2016–2021)	30 (UHF)	200 kW	34°7′23″S 146°14′1″E	Mount Bingar
MDN	13 January 2012	Network 10	Network 10 (2012–2016, 2021–2026); Nine Network (2016–2021)	32 (UHF)	200 kW	34°7′23″S 146°14′1″E	Mount Bingar

=== Channels ===
The following is a list of channels broadcast on MTN and MDN respectively.

MTN–29:

LCN	Channel
6	7HD
60	7HD
62	7two
63	7mate

AMN–30:

LCN	Channel
8	9HD
80	9HD
81	9Gem
82	9Go!
83	9Life
85	GOLD

MDN–32:

LCN	Channel
5	10HD
50	10HD
51	10 Drama
52	10 Comedy

== See also ==
- WIN Corporation
- Regional television in Australia
