= WIN (TV station) =

- Southern New South Wales & ACT; Australia
- Channels: Digital: see table below; Virtual: 8
- Branding: Nine, WIN

Programming
- Language: English
- Network: WIN Television
- Affiliations: Nine

Ownership
- Owner: WIN Corporation; (WIN Television NSW Pty Ltd)

History
- First air date: 18 March 1962
- Former channel numbers: see table below Analog: 4 (VHF) (1962–1988); Analog: 59 (UHF) (1988–2012)
- Former affiliations: Independent (18 March 1962 – 31 March 1989); Nine Network (31 March 1989 – 30 June 2016); Network 10 (1 July 2016 – 30 June 2021)
- Call sign meaning: Wollongong Illawarra New South Wales

Technical information
- Licensing authority: Australian Communications and Media Authority
- ERP: see table below
- HAAT: see table below
- Transmitter coordinates: see table below

Links
- Public licence information: Profile
- Website: www.wintv.com.au

WIN is a television station serving southern New South Wales and the Australian Capital Territory. It is the flagship station of the WIN Television network.

== History ==
Television Wollongong Transmission Limited (TWT) was incorporated on 4 October 1955 by a group of local businessmen. Five years later, it was awarded a licence by the Postmaster-General's Department, over a number of other groups aligned to Sydney-based stations ATN-7 and TCN-9, to broadcast to the Illawarra and South Coast regions. The new station was to broadcast on the VHF-4 frequency, using the callsign WIN (which stood for Wollongong Illawarra New South Wales, in line with other Australian call signs). Soon after, a plot of land was purchased at Fort Drummond, approximately two kilometres south of the Wollongong central business district, for the station's television studios.

Prior to the opening night's transmissions, WIN-4 undertook a television conversion program, aimed at encouraging residents to acquire new tuning equipment and converting television sets in the area to receive the station's allocated frequency. A transmitter was to be erected on Knight's Hill; however, test transmissions were delayed due to rain.

WIN-4 commenced transmissions at 5:15 p.m. on 18 March 1962. The first night was met with a number of technical issues, most notably the complete loss of audio. TCN-9 and ATN-7 refused to sell programming to the station, leading to an unstable financial situation which, at its peak, left the station with only 42 hours of programming.

In April 1963, Media Securities, owned by Rupert Murdoch, acquired a controlling interest in the station (his second television station after NWS-9 Adelaide) and soon appointed a new general manager, Bill Lean. Both TCN-9 and ATN-7 began purchasing several hours of first-run American television programming from WIN-4, following contractual arrangements signed by Murdoch. Throughout this period, WIN-4 expanded its repeater transmissions to include Moruya, Batemans Bay, Narooma, Bega and Eden. Local programming and the station's near-monopoly in the area meant that, by 1973, viewership had increased to occupy 63 percent of the audience.

In order to buy controlling interests in capital city stations TEN-10 Sydney and ATV-0 (now ATV-10) Melbourne, in June 1979, Murdoch sold his 76 per cent stake in the publicly listed Wollongong station to Oberon Broadcasters, owned by the head of Paramount Pictures' international distribution arm, Bruce Gordon. At the time, under the Broadcasting and Television Act, a company was not permitted to own more than 5 per cent in more than one television station in the same state.

Since inception in 1962, WIN has produced and broadcast notable programs including Sportsview and Sportsworld, a review of international, national and local sporting events. From the first week of transmissions, children's television series The Channel 4 Club was produced, with children's television program Stopwatch beginning in 1979. English-language educational programme You Say the Word began in 1971, catering to non-English-speaking immigrants. Long-running entertainment program Variety Italian Style premiered in 1974, with Malcom Elliott initially hosting the short-lived Tonight Show in 1981 being replaced by John Tingle a year later. To commemorate WIN Television's 21st year of broadcasting, a one-and-half-hour retrospective montage special was produced in 1983. WIN Television also co-produced telemovie Last Chance in 1986 with a Canadian television production company.

WIN aggregated with CBN and CTC's coverage areas on 31 March 1989; by 1990, it became the only television station to broadcast 24 hours a day, as its new competitors withdrew from all-night broadcasts due to cost issues.

== Programming ==
WIN Television broadcasts its programming from Nine Network, includes their regional signals of Nine, 9Gem, 9Go! and 9Life. WIN also broadcasts news, current affairs and sport programs such as Today Extra, Nine News, A Current Affair, Nine's Wide World of Sports, The NRL Sunday Footy Show, Sports Sunday and Today throughout this region.

WIN simulcasts the edition of Nine News from TCN-9 in Sydney.

== WIN News ==
WIN News produces four regional news bulletins for the area markets covered by WIN. The four regional news bulletins are:

- Illawarra & the South Coast
- Canberra, the ACT and surrounding areas of NSW including Queanbeyan, Yass, Cooma and Goulburn
- the Riverina
- the Central West

All bulletins are produced from newsrooms in Wollongong, Canberra, Dubbo, Orange, Griffith and Wagga Wagga.

Studio presentation for the New South Wales and the ACT bulletins are recorded from WIN's headquarters in Wollongong.

The New South Wales bulletins are presented by Bruce Roberts and sports presenter Melissa Russell. Bruce Roberts and Melissa Russell also present the Canberra edition.

The head of news in southern New South Wales and the ACT is Stella Lauri.

On 19 June 2019, WIN announced the axing of the Riverina and Central West news bulletins due to commercial viability, and from then on these areas now broadcast the NSW regional bulletin from Wollongong.

== Main transmitters ==
Region served	ch (Note: Analogue transmissions ceased as of 5 June 2012 as part of the national shutdown of analogue television)	DT	On-air date	Former channel number	Analogue Power	Digital Power	Analogue HAAT	Digital HAAT	Transmitter Coordinates	Transmitter Location
Canberra	31 (UHF)	11 (VHF)	31 March 1989		600 kW	50 kW	362 m	362 m	35°16′32″S 149°5′52″E	Black Mountain
Central Tablelands	39 (UHF)	35 (UHF)	30 December 1989		2000 kW	350 kW	627 m	628 m	33°20′32″S 148°59′1″E (analog); 33°20′31″S 148°58′59″E (digital)	Mount Canobolas
Central Western Slopes	32 (UHF)	10 (VHF)	30 December 1989		1000 kW	150 kW	648 m	653 m	31°20′32″S 149°1′22″E	Mount Cenn Cruaich
Illawarra	59 (UHF)	36 (UHF)	18 March 1962	4 (1962–1989)	950 kW	250 kW	505 m	600 m	34°37′6″S 150°41′50″E (analog); 34°37′8″S 150°41′49″E (digital)	Knights Hill
South Western Slopes and Eastern Riverina	32 (UHF)	50 (UHF)	30 December 1989		1600 kW	350 kW	525 m	540 m	34°49′13″S 147°54′5″E	Mount Ulandra
