= Viewer Access Satellite Television =

Satellite TV service provided by the Australian government

The Viewer Access Satellite Television service, or VAST, is a satellite television platform in Australia, providing digital television and radio services to remote and rural areas, as well as viewers in terrestrial black spots. The service uses the Optus C1 and Optus D3 satellites. It is partly funded by the Australian Government and managed through a joint-venture between Southern Cross Media and Imparja Television. It is an even more restricted free-to-view replacement for Optus Aurora providing channels which have been absent (such as a Network Ten affiliate and digital only secondary and HD network channels) on the remote service until now. The platform uses only H.264 video encoding and 8PSK, which allows for more lower bit rate channels on the limited transponder space that's available. The EPG uses an MHEG-5 guide instead of the usual more compatible DVB EIT.

== History ==
On 10 January 2010, the Australian Government announced a new satellite service to deliver digital television and radio channels to Australian viewers who reside in remote and rural areas, or who can't obtain adequate television signal in an existing metropolitan or regional terrestrial broadcast area, commonly referred to as being in a black spot. Initially, the service was only available to viewers in and around Mildura, Victoria, to coincide with Australia's first analog television switch-off. On 15 December 2010, the service was made available to viewers in the existing Remote Central and Eastern Australia and Mt Isa licence areas. In April 2011, the Western VAST service began for Regional and Remote Western Australia viewers.

From December 2013, CRN, NIRS, RPH, and the BBC World Service were transitioned to the new satellite platform over a two-month period from the existing Aurora platform and were the final channels to make the transition. From February 2014 was when the last Aurora uplink is ended.

== Availability ==
Anyone is entitled to access ABC and SBS channels on the VAST service, after completing a successful application, regardless of location within Australia.

Several different groups of people are currently entitled to use the VAST service to receive commercial stations:

- Those who live in areas designated as being part of the Remote Central & Eastern Australia licence area.
- Those who live outside the Remote Central & Eastern Australia licence area and meet any of these conditions:
  - live in an area predicted to have no terrestrial digital coverage
  - have approval to view the existing Optus Aurora service; due to being in a signal black spot
  - those who do not have Optus Aurora approval, in which they may apply for VAST from 6 months before the switchover in their licence area.^{1}
- Those who are traveling in the Remote Central & Eastern Australia and the Regional and Remote Western Australia licence areas may apply for a temporary travellers approval. (Allowing 6 months access).
- Those who live in areas of Western Australia where terrestrial coverage is not predicted to be available after the completion of the digital switchover in that state.

^{1 –} It was previously possible to apply for the Optus Aurora service instead, and then move to VAST before the 6-month period preceding digital switchover in the applicable licence area.

=== Equipment ===
Viewers accessing the service must use a VAST certified satellite television set-top box and smartcard, and go through an application process. The original set-top box is a model provided by the South African owned vendor Altech UEC, which also offers models with recording functions along with the newer offerings from Korean owned vendor Humax and a basic model "SatKing" from Australian owned vendor Phoenix Technology Group. The units with a recording function inhibit forward cuing and skipping to prevent commercials being bypassed. Unlike the Aurora service, VAST only uses Irdeto version two and three (not version one) for DVB encryption key management with each smart card locked to the serial number of the provided set-top box.

== Channels ==
VAST is designed to provide the same number of digital television and radio channels available in metropolitan terrestrial areas. A minimum of 17 digital television channels are currently available to eligible viewers. The service also provides a minimum of 39 digital radio channels and a number of niche channels. The channels are sorted into bouquets based on a number of states and territories in Australia. Each VAST certified set-top box is assigned a bouquet suitable for the geographical location the set-top box is registered to.

=== Television ===
ABC Television provides digital television channels ABC TV (ABN, ABV, ABQ, ABT, ABS, ABW, ABC Canberra, ABD), ABC HD, ABC Family/Kids, ABC Entertains and ABC News from 7 states and territories. SBS Television also provides SBS TV, SBS HD and SBS VICELAND from 7 states and territories, as well as SBS Food, SBS World Movies, NITV and SBS WorldWatch. The channels are assigned the same virtual channel numbers as terrestrial areas, but are also assigned 3-digit virtual channel numbers for out-of-area or interstate viewers.

Southern Cross Media, Imparja Television and Central Digital Television provide commercial digital television channels to VAST viewers in the Remote Central and Eastern Australia license area, which covers all states and territories except Western Australia. Standard-definition digital television channels 7two Central, 7mate Central, 9Gem, 9Go!, 10 Drama and 10 Comedy are each split into two separate feeds based on Australian Eastern Standard Time and Australian Eastern Summer Time respectively. High-definition digital television channels 7HD Central, Imparja HD and 10HD Central are also available.

Commercial digital television channels for VAST viewers in the Regional and Remote Western Australia license area are provided by Southern Cross Media, WIN Television and West Digital Television. Unlike the Remote Central and Eastern channels, they are all available in Western Standard Time and are assigned typical regional virtual channel numbers. Standard-definition channels Seven Regional WA, 7two, WIN's Nine Regional, 9Gem, 9Go!, 9Life, 10 West, 10 Drama and 10 Comedy are provided as well as high-definition channels 7mate, WIN HD's 9HD and 10 HD. Home shopping and sport data-casting channels ishop TV, Racing.com and TVSN are also provided by the WA commercial broadcasters.

As well as government and commercial channels, VAST provides Indigenous Community Television (ICTV) for remote communities in Northern Territory and Western Australia, as well as religious channels 3ABN International, ADTV, Amazing Facts, Angel TV, Daystar, GOD TV, Hope Channel, SBN International, TBN Inspire, TBN Pacific and Victory Channel.

In 2025, VAST upgraded the 7 Central, Imparja & 10 Central signals to HD whilst 7mate, Imparja Gem & 10 Drama were downgraded to SD. The EPG however doesn't list the channels with a 'HD' tag (e.g. 7HD Central, Imparja HD, 10HD Central)

=== Regional news ===

The Remote Central and Eastern commercial television channels carry minimal local news content due to the size of the licence area. Southern Cross Media came to an agreement with the Federal Government to provide the VAST Regional News service, a group of 14 channels broadcasting news bulletins and updates from over 40 regional television stations. The stations send their news programs to a playout centre in Canberra, ACT, operated by Southern Cross Media. A menu placeholder on virtual channel 4 directs viewers to the 401–414 virtual channel range.

=== Radio ===
Most terrestrial analog and DAB radio channels from ABC and SBS are provided as audio-only DVB channels. A number of niche radio channels such as Faith FM, Niche Radio Network, Radio TAB, Aussie Flashbacks, 2RPH, Vintage FM and Vision Radio Network are also provided, as well as community radio channels from regional Western Australia, Northern Territory, Queensland and South Australia are also provided, such as Yolngu Radio, CAAMA Radio, Gumala Radio, Radio Larrakia, 2CUZ FM, RadioNGM, PAKAM Radio, PAW Radio, Radio 5NPY, QRAM Central Radio, TEABBA Radio, TSIMA Radio and Waringarri Radio 6WR.

A number of community radio channels from Community Broadcasting Association of Australia such as CRN, NIRS, RPH, the BBC World Service and Hope Christian radio are also provided.

== See also ==
- Optus Aurora
- Regional television in Australia
- Television in Australia
- Television broadcasting in Australia
