= Sunraysia Television =

Australian television company

Sunraysia Television was a publicly listed company which owned Channel Nine Perth's parent company Swan Television and Radio Broadcasters from 1989 to 2007. Although listed on the ASX, Sunraysia had been majority owned by Eva Presser's Sabtel (between 44 and 50 per cent) with WIN Corporation owning another 43.65% of the company.

== History ==
Sunraysia Television has its origins in the area around Mildura, known as Sunraysia. It operated a single television licence, STV-8. In 1985, the station was purchased by Eva Presser.

In 1989, Sunraysia acquired Channel Nine Perth from Bond Media who were forced to sell it due to cross-media ownership laws restricting national audience reach. They paid A$95 million for the station. As part of the deal, it also sold STV-8 to Bond Media for $18 million, which was then onsold to ENT Ltd. for the same price.

In 1994, following a failed takeover bid for Sunraysia, Kerry Stokes sold his 21.2 per cent stake to Bruce Gordon's WIN Corporation which already held 19.9 per cent. Mrs Presser was quoted as calling the Stokes bid "uninvited, unnecessary, unwanted, unspectacular" and that her rejection wof the bid was "unequivocal".

== Selling of Nine Perth ==
In February 2007, PBL Media announced that it would acquire 100% of Swan Television and Radio Broadcasters from Sunraysia for $136.4 million. However, after protest from WIN Corporation owner Bruce Gordon, who was offering Sunraysia a revised $163.1 million, it was announced months later on 21 April that the board of Sunraysia would now endorse WIN's revised offer. The sale went through on 8 June 2007.

== Sunraysia & the Pressers ==
Eva's husband Dan is executive chairman of family company, Sabrands. Sabrands runs the Sunraysia Natural Beverages company, which similarly has no ties to the Sunraysia region, and since 2013 has owned the iconic Rosella business. The Pressers use Sunraysia as their personal brand name, which some may see as ironic given the name was also used in a 1920s dried fruit advertising campaign, for the Australian Dried Fruits Association - an entity with no connection to the Pressers.
