= ABQ =

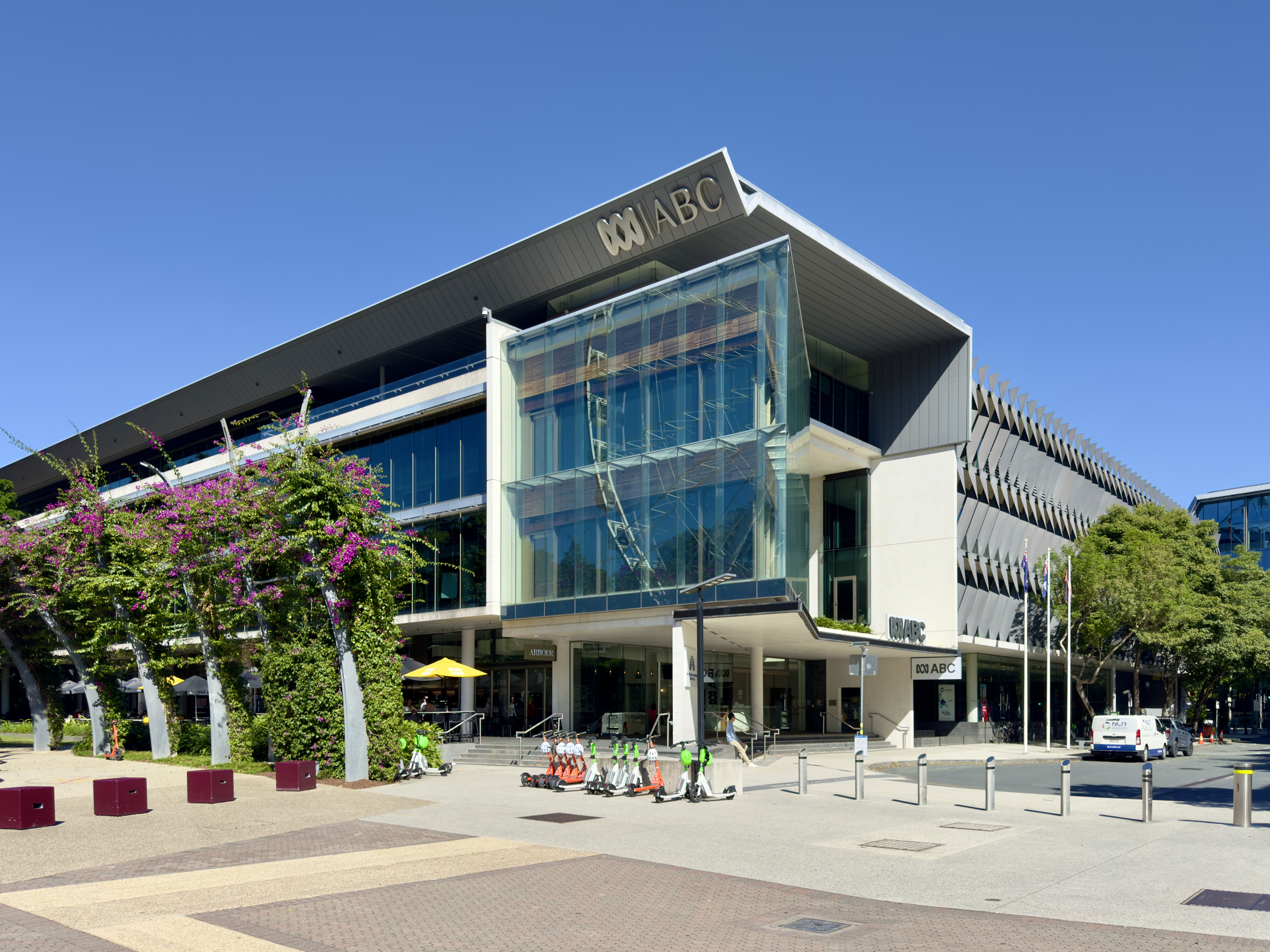
- Brisbane, Queensland; Australia
- Channels: Digital: 12 (VHF); Virtual: 2

Programming
- Language: English
- Affiliations: ABC Television

Ownership
- Owner: Australian Broadcasting Corporation

History
- First air date: 2 November 1959
- Former channel number: Analog: 2 (VHF) (1959–2013)
- Call sign meaning: ABC/Queensland

Technical information
- Licensing authority: Australian Communications and Media Authority
- ERP: 50 kW
- HAAT: 355 m
- Transmitter coordinates: 27°27′52″S 152°56′51″E

ABC Television in Queensland comprises national programming on the ABC television network in or from Brisbane, Queensland which broadcasts on a number of channels under the ABC call sign. There is some local programming from the Brisbane studio.

ABQ or ABQ-2 was the historic call sign of the Australian Broadcasting Corporation's television station in Brisbane, which began broadcasting on 2 November 1959 as the third television station in Queensland and Brisbane. with the "Q" in the call sign standing for Queensland.

ABC Television in Brisbane is based at a purpose-built headquarters on the South Bank. The station is received throughout the state through a number of relay transmitters.

== History ==
ABC Television started broadcasting from Brisbane on 2 November 1959, with the "Q" in the call sign standing for Queensland.

Available by satellite transmission on the now defunct Optus Aurora free-to-view platform during the 2000s, ABC's digital channels have been available via the Viewer Access Satellite Television (VAST) network since 2010.

For many years, the station was based at studios in the inner-western suburb of Toowong, with a transmitter at Mount Coot-tha. In December 2006, the Toowong studios were closed after an unacceptably high rate of breast cancer has been observed at the facility. An independent study examined 10 cases of breast cancer reported at the studios, and found the incidence rate was 11 times higher than the general working community. led to the closure of the site in December 2006, TV and radio operations were moved to alternative locations around the city.

Staff worked from several sites around Brisbane, with ABC Radio based in nearby Lissner Street in Toowong, ABC News staff working from Network Ten's Mount Coot-tha studios, ABC Innovation and Online staff working at QUT Kelvin Grove, and other staff based in other locations, including Coronation Drive and West End. On 10 January 2012, ABC Brisbane moved into new purpose-built accommodation in South Bank.

The analogue signal for Brisbane/Gold Coast/Sunshine Coast was shut off on May 28, 2013.

== ABC Television in Brisbane today ==
All ABC operations are located in the South Bank building. As of 2021 there is a large number of transmitters broadcasting a number of ABC channels throughout Queensland.

== Programming ==
ABC Television in Brisbane schedule largely consists of national programming with opt-outs for news and current affairs, rugby league and state election coverage.

=== Local programming ===
ABC News Queensland is presented by Jessica van Vonderen (Monday – Thursday) and Lexy Hamilton-Smith (Friday – Sunday). Weather is presented by Jenny Woodward (Sunday – Thursday). Finance is presented by David Chau in Sydney.

Past presenters of the bulletin have included Matt Wordsworth, Rod Young and Andrew Lofthouse. The latter two subsequently went on to read the flagship 6:00 pm bulletins on Seven and Nine respectively; the pair opposed each other in this timeslot between mid-2009 and late-2012, during which the Seven bulletin co-read by Young and Kay McGrath consistently rated higher than the Nine bulletin co-read by Lofthouse and Melissa Downes (as of 2017, however, Nine has regained the lead in the south-east Queensland ratings).

== Relay stations ==
The following stations currently or formerly relay ABQ throughout Queensland:

Call	Region served	City	Channels (Analog/ digital)	First air date	3rd letter's meaning	ERP (Analog/ digital)	HAAT (Analog/ digital)^{1}	Transmitter coordinates	Transmitter location
ABAQ	Alpha	Alpha	8 (VHF); NA	17 February 1975	Alpha	0.021 kW	88 m	23°37′5″S 146°37′49″E	Alpha
ABAAQ	Augathella	Augathella	11 (VHF); NA	8 March 1974	AugathellA	0.021 kW	51 m	25°48′23″S 146°35′21″E	Augathella
ABBQ	Barcaldine	Barcaldine	10 (VHF); 7 (VHF)	17 February 1975	Barcaldine	0.02 kW; 0.005 kW	61 m 61 m	23°31′43″S 145°15′33″E	Barcaldine
ABBLQ	Blackall	Blackall	9 (VHF); 7 (VHF)	17 February 1975	BlackalL	0.2 kW; 0.05 kW	61 m 66 m	24°25′53″S 145°29′48″E	Blackall
ABCAQ	Cunnamulla	Cunnamulla	10 (VHF); NA	8 March 1974	CunnamullA	0.026 kW	41 m	28°2′54″S 145°42′6″E	Cunnamulla
ABCEQ	Charleville	Charleville	9 (VHF); 11 (VHF)	8 March 1974	CharlevillE	0.26 kW; 0.065 kW	99 m 99 m	26°24′59″S 146°21′20″E	Charleville
ABCLQ	Cloncurry	Cloncurry	7 (VHF); 6 (VHF)	17 March 1971	CLoncurry	0.2 kW; 0.05 kW	115 m 115 m	20°43′21″S 140°32′21″E	Mount Avarice
ABCTQ	Clermont	Clermont	10 (VHF); 54 (UHF)	17 February 1975	ClermonT	0.1 kW; 0.2 kW	89 m 80 m	22°51′22″S 147°38′39″E	Clermont
ABDQ	Darling Downs	Toowoomba	32 (UHF)^{2 6} 37 (UHF)	16 December 1963	Darling Downs	1600 kW; 500 kW	570 m 549 m	26°53′32″S 151°36′29″E	Mount Mowbullan
ABDIQ	Dirranbandi	Dirranbandi	7 (VHF); NA	8 March 1974	DirranbandI	0.016 kW	65 m	28°33′28″S 148°15′1″E	Dirranbandi
ABEQ	Emerald	Emerald	11 (VHF); 9 (VHF)	21 December 1973	Emerald	2 kW; 0.625 kW	92 m 92 m	23°28′28″S 148°9′4″E	Emerald
ABGQ	Goondiwindi	Goondiwindi	6 (VHF); 56 (UHF)	9 July 1973	Goondiwindi	0.5 kW; 0.625 kW	41 m 49 m	28°31′9″S 150°20′16″E	Goondiwindi
ABHQ	Hughenden	Hughenden	9 (VHF); 8 (VHF)	30 June 1971	Hughenden	0.2 kW; 0.125 kW	80 m 80 m	20°50′53″S 144°11′9″E	Hughenden
ABIQ	Mount Isa	Mount Isa	6 (VHF); 7 (VHF)	21 December 1970	Mount Isa	1.6 kW; 0.4 kW	72 m 75 m	20°44′4″S 139°30′45″E	DCA Hill
ABJQ	Julia Creek	Julia Creek	10 (VHF); NA	20 April 1971	Julia Creek	0.2 kW	65 m	20°39′9″S 141°44′23″E	Julia Creek
ABLQ	Longreach	Longreach	6 (VHF); 10 (VHF)	17 February 1975	Longreach	0.7 kW; 0.175 kW	69 m 69 m	23°27′22″S 144°21′6″E	Longreach
ABMQ	Mackay	Mackay	8 (VHF)^{3 6} 10 (VHF)	21 December 1967	Mackay	360 kW; 90 kW	611 m 613 m	21°1′56″S 148°56′36″E	Mount Blackwood
ABMKQ	Mary Kathleen	Mary Kathleen	9 (VHF) (closed in 1986)	15 December 1971	Mary Kathleen	Unknown NA	Unknown NA	Unknown NA	Mary Kathleen
ABMLQ	Mitchell	Mitchell	6 (VHF); 12 (VHF)	8 March 1974	MitchelL	0.2 kW; 0.05 kW	149 m 149 m	26°32′35″S 148°6′41″E	Mitchell Escarpment
ABMNQ	Morven	Morven	7 (VHF); NA	8 March 1974	MorveN	0.13 kW	133 m	26°30′20″S 147°8′4″E	Morven
ABMSQ	Miles	Miles	9 (VHF); 63 (UHF)	30 November 1973	MileS	0.32 kW; 0.8 kW	132 m 132 m	26°38′58″S 150°16′14″E	Miles Hill
ABNQ	Cairns	Cairns	9 (VHF)^{6} 8 (VHF)	25 July 1966	North	200 kW; 50 kW	1190 m 1190 m	17°15′51″S 145°51′14″E	Mount Bellenden Ker
ABRQ	Rockhampton	Rockhampton	9 (VHF)^{4 6} 11 (VHF)	21 December 1963	Rockhampton	160 kW; 50 kW	495 m 495 m	23°43′48″S 150°32′9″E	Mount Hopeful
ABRAQ	Roma	Roma	7 (VHF); 8 (VHF)	14 December 1973	RomA	2 kW; 0.5 kW	103 m 105 m	26°34′20″S 148°51′1″E	Timbury Hills
ABRDQ	Richmond	Richmond	6 (VHF); 7 (VHF)	4 June 1971	RichmonD	0.2 kW; 0.05 kW	70 m 70 m	20°45′0″S 143°9′29″E	Richmond
ABSQ	Southern Downs	Warwick	1 (VHF)^{6} 45 (UHF)	4 July 1966	Southern Downs	200 kW; 500 kW	255 m 316 m	28°32′9″S 151°49′58″E	Passchendaele Ridge
ABSEQ	Springsure	Springsure	8 (VHF)^{5} 46 (UHF)	17 February 1975	SpringsurE	0.8 kW; 2 kW	280 m 283 m	24°8′31″S 148°9′1″E	Roddas Lookout
ABSGQ	St. George	St. George	8 (VHF); 12 (VHF)	8 March 1974	St. George	0.13 kW; 0.033 kW	63 m 64 m	27°59′40″S 148°34′1″E	St. George
ABTQ	Townsville	Townsville	3 (VHF)^{6} 31 (UHF)	21 September 1964	Townsville	160 kW; 200 kW	635 m 644 m	19°20′36″S 146°46′50″E	Mount Stuart
ABWQ	Wide Bay	Maryborough	6 (VHF)^{6} 9A (VHF)	8 October 1965	Wide Bay	240 kW; 60 kW	601 m 646 m	25°25′37″S 152°7′3″E	Mount Goonaneman
ABWNQ	Winton	Winton	8 (VHF); 7 (VHF)	15 November 1974	WintoN	1.6 kW; 0.4 kW	97 m 94 m	22°14′31″S 143°2′57″E	Rangelands

Notes:

1. HAAT estimated from http://www.itu.int/SRTM3/ using EHAAT.
2. ABDQ was on VHF channel 3 from its 1963 sign-on until 1993, moving to its current channel in order to accommodate FM radio.
3. ABMQ was on VHF channel 4 from its 1967 sign-on until 1988, moving to its current channel in order to accommodate FM radio.
4. ABRQ was on VHF channel 3 from its 1963 sign-on until 1988, moving to its current channel in order to accommodate FM radio.
5. ABSEQ was on VHF channel 9 from its 1975 sign-on until 1989.
6. ABMKQ was on VHF channel 9 from its 1971 sign-on until its closure on 30 April 1986.

== See also ==
- History of the Australian Broadcasting Corporation
- Television broadcasting in Australia
