= Gold (Australian TV channel) =

Australian advertorial datacasting channel

- Logo used since 2012
- Country: Australia
- Broadcast area: Regional QLD, Northern NSW & Gold Coast, Southern NSW & ACT, Griffith, Regional VIC, Mildura, Tasmania, Eastern SA
- Network: WIN Television

Programming
- Language: English
- Picture format: 576i (SDTV) 16:9
- Timeshift service: Gold 2 (13 July 2013 – 19 January 2016)

Ownership
- Owner: WIN Corporation
- Sister channels: WIN Television; WIN HD; 9Gem; 9Go! 9Life

History
- Launched: 1 May 2012; 14 years ago
- Former names: WIN Gold (1–5 May 2012)

Links
- Website: wintv.com.au/page/gold

Availability

Terrestrial
- Freeview WIN regional (virtual): 85

Gold (stylised as GOLD) is an Australian advertorial datacasting channel that launched on 1 May 2012 by the WIN Corporation. It is available to homes in most regional WIN Television viewing areas on LCN 85. The channel broadcasts mostly infomercials, as well as education, lifestyle, community programming as well as television classics from the Crawfords library.

== History ==
On 26 April 2012, a test broadcast commenced on LCN 84 with the channel name "TBA". On 30 April 2012, the broadcast changed to a screen informing viewers that WIN Gold (stylised as WIN GOLD) would commence on 1 May 2012. The channel launched at 6am and was initially branded as "WIN Gold", until it was changed to simply Gold on 5 May 2012.

With the March 2016 revival of WIN HD on LCN 80 (then-occupied by 9Gem) and launch of 9Life on LCN 84 (then-occupied by Gold), WIN's channel listing was reshuffled to mirror Nine's metropolitan listing with 9Gem on LCN 82, 9Go! on LCN 83, 9Life on LCN 84, Extra on LCN 85 and Gold on LCN 86.

On 1 July 2016, WIN switched its primary affiliation from the Nine Network to Network 10. Consequently, WIN's channel listing was reshuffled to place One on LCN 81, Eleven on LCN 82, TVSN on LCN 84 and Gold on LCN 85.

On 1 July 2021, WIN switched back its primary affiliation from Network 10 to the Nine Network. Consequently, WIN's channel listing was reshuffled to place 9Gem on LCN 81, 9Go! on LCN 82 and 9Life on LCN 83, while TVSN and Gold would continue to broadcast on LCN 84 and LCN 85.

== Availability ==
Gold is available in standard definition through WIN's stations: RTQ Queensland, WIN Southern New South Wales & ACT, VTV Victoria, TVT Tasmania, MTN Griffith, STV Mildura, MGS Mount Gambier, LRS Riverland and NBN Northern NSW/Gold Coast.

The channel was previously available on WIN's Nine-branded metropolitan stations NWS Adelaide and STW Perth on LCN 94 until 2013 when both stations were bought by the Nine Network, owned by Nine Entertainment. In these two cities Gold was replaced by Extra, which is Nine's infomercial datacast channel.

=== Gold 2 ===
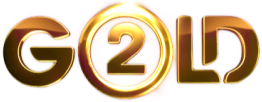
Gold2 logo

WIN launched a second datacasting channel, Gold 2, on 13 July 2013 as a five-hour timeshift of Gold located on LCN 82. It was also shortly available in Perth on LCN 92, as WIN Corporation had control over the station until 30 September 2013, when it was taken over by Nine Entertainment, the owners of the Nine Network. As a result, Gold 2 was replaced by Extra 2 in Perth. NWS in Adelaide did not transmit Gold 2 because the station was already under Nine's control at the time of the channel's launch, but it did launch Nine's counterpart, Extra 2, on 1 July 2013, 12 days before the channel's launch.

Gold 2 was replaced by the Nine Network's metropolitan informercial channel Extra on 19 January 2016. Extra later moved to LCN 85 on WIN's stations.

== See also ==
- List of digital television channels in Australia
