= WIN Corporation =

Private Australian media company

WIN Corporation Pty Ltd
- Type: Private
- Industry: Free To Air Television; Pay Television; Television Production; Radio broadcasting Telecommunications
- Founded: 18 March 1962
- Headquarters: Wollongong, Australia
- Key people: Bruce Gordon, Deputy Chairman/Owner; Andrew Gordon, Executive Chairman
- Products: WIN Television; Crawford Productions
- Owner: Birketu Pty Ltd.
- Website: wintv.com.au

WIN Corporation is a private Australian media company that owns assets including the WIN Television network, Crawford Productions and several local radio stations. The company is based in Wollongong, New South Wales.

== History ==
=== Founding ===
The WIN brand began from a sole free-to-air terrestrial television station in Wollongong, WIN-4, owned by Television Wollongong Transmissions (TWT). In 1979, then-owner Rupert Murdoch sold his 76 per cent controlling interest in TWT to Oberon Broadcasters, a private investment group which included Paramount Television programming executive Bruce Gordon. This allowed Murdoch to purchase Sydney station TEN-10. In 1985, TWT was made public on the Sydney Stock Exchange as TWT Holdings Limited with Gordon retaining a 70 per cent stake. Gordon privatised the business in 1992 to become WIN Corporation.

=== Expansion, aggregation and industry consolidation ===
In the late 1980s, the Federal Government's television equalisation program (known as aggregation) gave Gordon the opportunity to initiate a period of growth by acquiring television stations in regional Queensland, Victoria, and Tasmania. In the late 1990s, WIN acquired their South Australian station and developed a new Western Australian station from scratch. These stations were integrated into what is now known as the WIN Network. The WIN Network covers large areas of regional Australia and has a total audience reach of 4.842 million people.

Through Bruce Gordon's leadership, in the late 1990s and 2000s, WIN built stakes in PBL, Network Ten, and TPG Telecom. TPG Telecom was at the time known as SP Telemedia and owned fellow Nine affiliate NBN Television.

August 2005 saw WIN purchase a controlling 50.1 per cent stake in satellite subscription television carrier SelecTV, however failure in adequately growing the subscriber base along with high debts saw the business placed in voluntary administration in February 2011.

On 21 April 2007, the board of Sunraysia Television endorsed WIN's revised offer of $163 million for Channel Nine Perth , which went through on 8 June 2007. On 30 May 2007, Southern Cross Broadcasting announced its sale of Channel Nine Adelaide to WIN for $105 million. In June 2013, WIN offloaded the Nine-branded metropolitan Adelaide station to Nine Network's parent Nine Entertainment Co. for $140 million along with an option to purchase the Perth station, which was exercised in September 2013. In October 2015 WIN Corporation purchased a 14 per cent stake in Nine Entertainment Co. from investment fund operator Apollo.

In 2008, WIN invested in a 50 per cent share of the Australian Poker League, buying from its founder Martin Martinez. However this stake was sold in 2012.

On 4 June 2009, signalling their continued interest in digital assets, WIN increased to 18.4 per cent their stake in publicly listed company Quickflix, an Australian provider of online DVD rental and subscription movie and television series downloads. In the following years, WIN's share of the business dwindled down to 3.5 per cent as of 2014 as Quickflix continued to raise capital through issuing new shares. In April 2016, Quickflix entered voluntary administration.

WIN held a long-term interest in a small cinema chain in Tasmania through a joint venture with Village Roadshow until 2013. The joint venture owned four cinemas which were branded as 'Village Cinemas'. This interest was originally acquired by ENT Ltd. in 1988.

=== Today ===
In early 2006, WIN Corporation bought a 25% stake in the St. George Illawarra Dragons from the Illawarra Steelers for $6.5 million. In August 2018 WIN Corporation purchased the Illawarra Steelers remaining 25% stake for a "commercially in confidence" sum, taking its stake to 50%.

It was announced on 23 May 2016 that WIN Television had signed an affiliation agreement with Network Ten for a five-year period starting on 1 July 2016. WIN's former affiliation partner, Nine Network, signed with Southern Cross Austereo in April 2016 having secured a 50 per cent revenue share deal.

WIN plays a prominent role in the local Illawarra community through investment in long-term naming rights to the Dragons' Wollongong home ground, WIN Stadium. WIN also holds naming rights to the neighbouring WIN Entertainment Centre, home to basketball's Illawarra Hawks.

In June 2019, WIN closed several newsrooms throughout New South Wales and Queensland, including Orange, Wagga, Albury and Queensland's Hervey Bay.

On 13 February 2025, Network 10 announced they would be acquiring NRN from WIN Television.

In January 2026, it was announced that WIN would acquire NBN Television from Nine Entertainment, to be operated as a Nine Network regional affiliate.

In February 2026, it was announced Nine Darwin would be acquired by WIN Corporation's WIN Television, expanded broadcast operations into the NT.

== Assets ==
=== Television ===
- WIN Television
  - RTQ Queensland
  - NBN Northern New South Wales and the Gold Coast
  - WIN Southern New South Wales and the ACT
  - VTV Victoria
  - TVT Tasmania
  - AMN/MDN/MTN Griffith (includes Seven Griffith, Nine Griffith and 10 Griffith)
  - STV Mildura
  - SES/RTS and MGS/LRS South Australia (includes Seven SA, Nine SA and 10 SA)
  - NTD Darwin
  - WOW Western Australia
- Tasmanian Digital Television (50% joint venture with Seven Media Group)
- West Digital Television (50% joint venture with Seven Media Group)
- Nine Entertainment Co. (15.24% stake)

=== Radio ===
WIN Corporation owns two FM radio stations in New South Wales:

- i98FM Wollongong/Illawarra (call sign 2WIN, 98.1 MHz)
- C91.3FM Campbelltown (call sign 2MAC, 91.3 MHz)

=== Other assets ===
- Crawford Productions
- Digital Distribution Australia
- Broadcast Services Australia (15.6% stake)
- TPG Telecom (1.5% stake)
- St George Illawarra Dragons (50% stake)

=== Former ===
- Mildura Digital Television (50% joint venture with Seven West Media) – Closed on 30 June 2024.
- Nine Adelaide – sold in 2013 to Nine Entertainment
- Nine Perth - sold in 2013 to Nine Entertainment
- NRN, a television station in Northern NSW. Sold to Paramount Global (now Skydance) in May 2025.

== See also ==
- Regional television in Australia
- List of NRL club owners
