= West Digital Television =

Western Australian digital television network

- Bunbury, Geraldton, Kalgoorlie, Regional and Remote Western Australia, Cocos/Keeling Island, Christmas Island; Australia
- Channels: Digital: 11 (VHF)

Programming
- Language: English
- Affiliations: 10

Ownership
- Owner: Seven Media Group (50%); WIN Corporation (50%); (West Digital Television Pty Ltd)

History
- First air date: 10 June 2010
- Former affiliations: Nine (1 July 2016 – 30 June 2021); 10 (10 June 2010 – 30 June 2016, 1 July 2021 – present)

Technical information
- Licensing authority: Australian Communications and Media Authority

West Digital Television is an Australian digital television network jointly owned by Seven Media Group and WIN Corporation. It broadcasts free-to-air on a number of digital terrestrial transmitters in regional and remote areas of Western Australia, as well as free-to-view on the Viewer Access Satellite Television service. The network began as an affiliate of Network 10, remaining so until 1 July 2016, when it switched to the Nine Network. On 1 July 2021, it returned to Network 10, broadcasting a direct feed of NEW-10 Perth.

The network is similar to other joint ventures already available in Tasmania, Mildura, Darwin and Central and Eastern Australia. As Seven Regional WA consists of three different stations licensed in Albany/Bunbury, Kalgoorlie and Geraldton, and a fourth licensed to the rest of the state as part of the Remote Commercial Television Licence scheme, West Digital Television's network is made up of four separate stations. Each of the four stations trade as West Digital Television Pty Ltd.

== History ==
On 18 June 2009, the Australian Communications & Media Authority allocated new "Section 38B" television broadcasting licences to a joint venture company owned by Prime Media and WIN Television. The company, named West Digital Television, launched Ten West on Thursday 10 June 2010 as part of the initial introduction of digital commercial television in Kalgoorlie, Karratha, Mawson Trig and Mingenew.

West Digital Television launched on the Viewer Access Satellite Television platform in April 2011.

Multi-channels One and Eleven were launched to Regional WA viewers on 28 July 2011, the same day digital commercial television commenced in Bunbury.

=== Switch to Nine ===
On 1 July 2016, WIN's Nine Network-affiliated stations switched to Network Ten, displacing WDT's affiliation and requiring the station to negotiate a switch to Nine Network. WDT failed to reach an affiliation deal with Nine in time for the switchover, with the co-owners stating that Nine had been actively rejecting offers. At this time, the channel temporarily suspended transmission, with programming replaced by a loop of scenic footage with the scrolling message "Programming on this channel in Regional Western Australia is currently unavailable." On the evening of 2 July 2016 at around 7:30 p.m. WST, WDT began to carry Nine programming, joining its federal election coverage already in progress.

=== Back to 10 ===
On 12 March 2021, Nine announced that it would return to WIN Television as its regional affiliate in most markets including Western Australia, beginning 1 July 2021, in a deal that lasts at least seven years. This will include WIN paying half of its regional advertising revenue to Nine Entertainment Co., and providing advertising time for Nine's properties on WIN's radio and television outlets. WIN will also provide advertising sales services for Nine's O&Os NBN and NTD (with the former succeeding a similar agreement it had with Southern Cross Austereo). Nine CEO Hugh Marks explained that "while our relationship with Southern Cross has been strong over the last five years, the opportunities presented by the WIN Network to both extend the reach of Nine's premium content into more regional markets under one agreement, and to work co-operatively with them on a national and local news operation, mean this is the right time for us to return to WIN".

In June 2021, 10 announced that it would return to Southern Cross Austereo as its regional affiliate in the markets of the ACT & Southern NSW, regional Victoria and regional Queensland, beginning on 1 July 2021 in a deal that would originally last at least two years. This has ended WIN's five-year agreement with Network 10. Since Southern Cross Austereo does not have a television presence in Western Australia, 10 affiliated with WDT in the region from 1 July 2021, changing channel numbers for the main 10 channel to channel 5, 10 Drama to channel 50 and 10 Comedy to channel 55.

Its sister joint-venture in Mildura, MDV, also owned by Seven and WIN, closed down on 1 July 2024 due to continued financial losses. West Digital Television was also due to close down on 1 July 2024, but the Albanese government's communications department approved $32.9 million in an increase in funding the costs for the station's satellite contract. This allowed WDT to continue broadcasting.

== Programming ==
The network rebroadcasts a direct feed of NEW-10 Perth, including programming and events produced in Perth. The network previously rebroadcast a direct feed of STW-9 Perth from 2016 to 2021. West Digital Television does not produce any local programming.

=== News ===
West Digital Television simulcasts the Perth edition of 10 News from NEW-10 produced from both TEN-10 in Sydney and NEW-10 in Perth, alongside the 5pm weekend news from TEN-10 in Sydney. It previously simulcast the Perth edition of Nine News from STW-9, alongside the 5pm weekend news from TCN-9 in Sydney and 6pm weekend news from STW-9 in Perth.

== Availability ==
West Digital Television station broadcast areas: SDW (green), VDW (blue), GDW (fuchsia), WDW (yellow)

The network's channels are available statewide in digital terrestrial and digital satellite format. Below is a table showing the logical channel numbers (LCN) for the full suite of digital services.

LCN	Service
5	10 HD
50	10 Drama
55	10 Comedy

=== Terrestrial ===
West Digital Television operates four television stations in regional and remote areas of Western Australia – SDW in the South West, VDW in the Goldfields, GDW in the Mid West and WDW for the remaining areas of the state. The stations are based on Seven Regional WA's separate licence areas and all broadcast free-to-air digital television channels 10, 10 Drama and 10 Comedy. Terrestrial transmissions are available in many regional cities and towns, including Albany, Broome, Bunbury, Carnarvon, Geraldton, Kalgoorlie, Karratha, Merredin, as well as others.

=== Satellite ===
The network is also broadcasts the same channels free-to-view on the Viewer Access Satellite Television service. The satellite service can be accessed by eligible viewers in the Western Australia TV3 licence area, which includes the entire state of WA, Christmas Island and Cocos/Keeling Islands.
