= Sky News Business Channel =

Former pay television business news channel

- Final logo, used between 2010 and 2018
- Country: Australia

Programming
- Language: English
- Picture format: 576i (SDTV 16:9); 1080i (HDTV)

Ownership
- Owner: Australian News Channel (News Corp Australia)
- Sister channels: Sky News Australia; Sky News Weather Channel; Sky News Extra

History
- Launched: 7 January 2008; 18 years ago
- Closed: 29 September 2018; 7 years ago
- Replaced by: Your Money

Sky News Business Channel (also known as Sky News Money during primetime and Sky News Real Estate on Saturdays) was an Australian pay television business news channel, available nationally on the Foxtel subscription platform and via mobile through Foxtel Go.

It was owned by Australian News Channel, which also owns news-focused sister channel Sky News Australia.

== History ==
Former Sky News Business logo

Australian News Channel (ANC) announced it was to launch Australia's first national business channel in 2008, at the onset of the 2008 financial crisis. It was officially launched on 31 January 2008 at the Australian Securities Exchange. Sky News Business would utilise and simulcast content from Fox Business Network in the United States. In turn, Fox Business Network would air coverage from Sky News Business in order to provide Australian financial news coverage to American audiences.

The channel would also utilise the resources of the Sky UK Business News service in the UK, and Reuters Television. At launch, it was claimed the channel would include 16 hours of locally produced content daily.

James Daggar-Nickson was the business editor and channel manager of Sky News Business.

On 19 January 2016, the channel launched a high-definition simulcast feed.

In June 2018, it was announced that ANC would enter into a joint venture with the Nine Network to create Your Money, a business news channel that replaced the Sky News Business Channel on Foxtel channel 601 and also be available free-to-air through Nine on channel 95 in metropolitan markets and Darwin and also on channel 85 in the Northern NSW market and the Gold Coast. Sky News Business ceased broadcasting at 8:30 pm Eastern on 29 September 2018, ahead of its relaunch as Your Money at 6:00 am Eastern on 1 October 2018. Promotional trailers for Your Money were shown on the channel during the long break time.

== Programming ==
Sky News Business Channel consisted of live rolling coverage of and analysis of the ASX and international markets, finance and economic news and personal investment trends throughout the day on weekdays, with replays of analysis or specialty programs after 9:30pm AEST weeknights and all weekend.

Logo of Sky News Money programming block, which ran during primetime on weekdays

From 6 July 2015, the channel ran a programming block titled Sky News Money between 6:30 pm and 6 am weeknights.

Logo of Sky News Real Estate programming block, which ran on Saturdays.

From 2016, the channel ran another programming block titled Sky News Real Estate on Saturdays, broadcasting rolling coverage of live auctions, property advice and listings for six hours from 8:30 am Sydney time. Hosted by Sophie Hull and James Treble, the programming was produced in conjunction with REA Group (a fellow News Corp Australia company).

- First Business
- Trading Day
- Lunch Money
- At The Close
- Market Day
- Market Moves
- MediaWeek
- Business Agenda
- The Perrett Report
- Switzer
- Your Money Your Call
- Business Night
- RatesLIVE
- Business View
- Business Success
- Business Class
- LawTV
- Market Express
- On The Record with Carson Scott
- Read and Profit
- Rates Reaction
- Social Business
- The Week in Business
- Sunday Business

=== Special programming ===
On 25 April 2015 the Sky News Business Channel aired an episode of American series 20/20 in simulcast with U.S. network ABC, featuring an interview with Caitlyn Jenner (then Bruce). (Note: Jenner changed her name due to gender transition in 2015.)

== Availability ==
=== Reception ===
Sky News Business Channel was Australia's only business and finance focused news channel. Foreign business news channels CNBC and Bloomberg Television are also available on the Foxtel platform.

Sky News Business reached close to 268,000 different people on average each week, with 72% of viewers being male, 28% of Sky News Business viewers were people 40–54 and 38% aged 55–69.

== Bureaus ==
At launch, Sky News Business' studio was located within the Sky News centre at Foxtel's headquarters in the Sydney suburb of Macquarie Park. Sky News Business also used the resources of the Sky News network of bureaus and reporters across Australia and New Zealand.

At the start of 2018, the channel relocated its studios to the News Corp Australia headquarters. The new studio was subsequently used by the channel's successor, Your Money.

It was common for Sky News Business reporters to report from Exchange Square, within the headquarters of the Australian Securities Exchange for ASX updates, as well as outside the Reserve Bank of Australia in Martin Place, Sydney when news was expected from the Reserve Bank.

=== Third party crosses ===
Sky News Business had live camera links to Australia's major financial institutions. The channel featured regular breaking news, commentary and analysis from leading Australian economists, fund managers, brokers and analysts at ANZ, National Australia Bank, Westpac and Commonwealth Bank.

Sky News Business also had live camera links to various financial institutions in which it has commercial arrangements.

== Notable presenters ==
=== Presenters ===
- Sophie Hull – Sky News Real Estate
- James Treble – Sky News Real Estate
- Leanne Jones
- Ingrid Willinge
- James Dagger-Nickson
- Peter Switzer

=== Former presenters ===
- Brooke Corte, now with sister channel Sky News Live
- Ahron Young, now with sister channel Sky News Live
- Janine Perrett – The Perrett Report, now with sister channel Sky News Live
- Helen Dalley
- Carson Scott

== See also ==
- Sky News Live, sister channel of Sky News Business Channel and primary channel of Australian News Channel Pty Ltd.
- Your Money, a channel which replaced Sky News Business Channel, a 50/50 joint venture between Australian News Channel Pty Ltd and Nine Entertainment via Australian Money Channel Pty Ltd, it also replaced Extra. It closed in 2019.
