= Your Money (TV channel) =

Australian cable news channel

- Country: Australia

Programming
- Language: English
- Picture format: 576i (SDTV 16:9); 1080i (HDTV)

Ownership
- Owner: Australian News Channel (50%); Nine Entertainment (50%)
- Sister channels: Channel 9; 9Gem; 9Go!; 9Life; Sky News Live; Sky News Weather Channel; Fox Sports News

History
- Launched: 1 October 2018; 7 years ago
- Replaced: Sky News Business Channel (on Foxtel); Extra (on DTT)
- Closed: 17 May 2019; 7 years ago
- Replaced by: 9Gem HD (on DTT)

Availability at the time of closure

Terrestrial
- Freeview Nine owned (virtual): 95/85

Your Money was a short-lived Australian 24-hour business news channel operated through a joint venture between Australian News Channel Pty Ltd and Nine Entertainment. The channel was available nationally on cable and satellite on the Foxtel subscription platform, in metropolitan areas of Australia through free-to-air digital terrestrial television, and streamed online.

The channel launched on 1 October 2018, replacing both Sky News Business Channel on Foxtel and Extra on DTT. Until its closure on 17 May 2019, the channel featured stock market and trading information during opening hours of the Australian Stock Exchange (ASX), much like its predecessor Sky News Business, and aspirational and lifestyle programming during primetime.

== History ==
The channel was announced in June 2018; it would be operated as a joint venture between Australian News Channel (a subsidiary of News Corp Australia) and Nine Entertainment (through Nine Network) via Australian Money Channel Pty Ltd., replacing the former's finance channel Sky News Business Channel on Foxtel and the latter's datacasting informercial channel Extra on DTT. Promotional trailers ran on the former channel spaces of both Sky News Business and Extra until 6am AEDT on 1 October 2018, when the channel was launched. The channel retained large portions of programming and staff from the Sky News Business Channel, but would feature lifestyle and consumer-focused programs outside of trading hours.

Your Money was headquartered at the News Corp Australia headquarters in Sydney, which Sky News Business moved to at the start of 2018. Kylie Merrit was the channel's CEO.

The channel ceased transmission on 17 May 2019, with the staff and viewers being given two weeks notice; the channel's owners declared Your Money was financially unsustainable due to lack of advertisers. On DTT, Nine began gradually placing an HD version of 9Gem on Your Money's channel space, area by area. On Foxtel, the channel space on channel number 601 that was created by Sky News Business in 2008 folded and ceased to exist.

== Programming ==
Your Money consisted of many programs which aired on its predecessor Sky News Business Channel, consisting of live rolling coverage and analysis of the ASX and international markets, finance and economic news throughout the day on weekdays. The channel's primetime line-up featured flagship program Your Money Live, followed by bespoke specialty programs until 11pm AEST when the channel simulcast Fox Business Network. Saturdays featured real-estate programming (also carried over from its former self) including live auctions from 8:30am to 2:30pm.

== Notable presenters ==
- Brooke Corte – Your Money Live
- James Daggar-Nickson – Trading Day – The Open and Swipe
- Ticky Fullerton – Ticky
- James Treble – Auction Day
- Peter Switzer – Money Talks
- Chris Kohler – Your Money Live
- James Gregory Wilkinson – Wayfarer
