= James Treble =

Australian interior designer (born 1969)

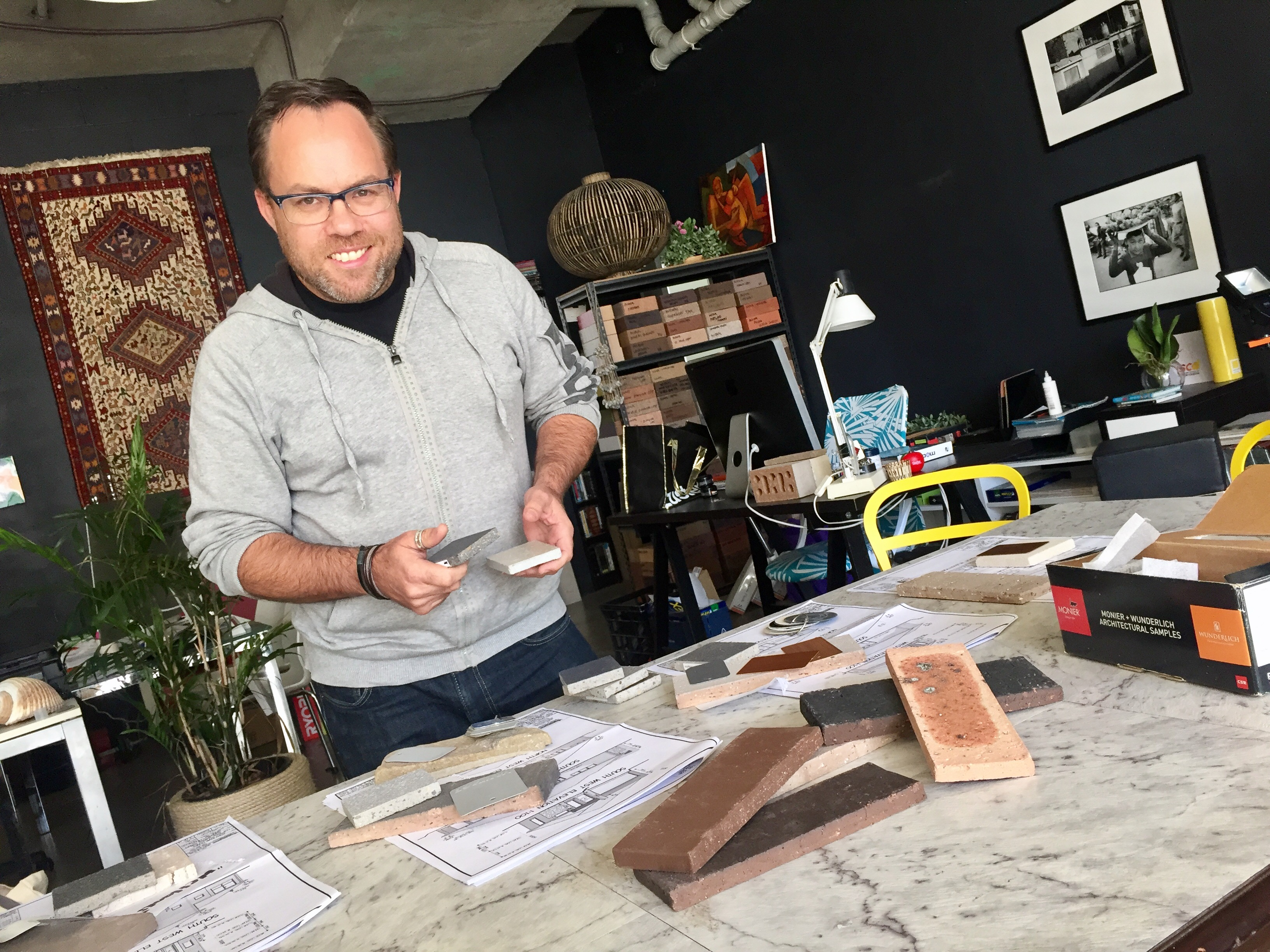
- Born: 1969 (age 56–57); Sydney, Australia
- Occupations: Building and interior designer, television presenter
- Years active: 2012 to present (on TV)
- Television: 9Life
- Partner: artist Sandro Nocentini
- Website: jamestreble.com

James Treble is an Australian building and interior designer. He hosts the TV show Renovate Or Rebuild on Nine Network. He also is a presenter on Open Homes Australia on 9Life. Treble is publicly known for his weekly six-hour live co-hosting on Your Money and as the design expert on the Network Ten lifestyle program, The Living Room for seven seasons, from 2012 until 2019. He has been an ambassador for Planet Ark since 2015.

In 2021 James was awarded the NSW Fellowship from the Design Institute of Australia. This award was granted for his contribution to the design industry, and the continuous support and education of new interior designers.

Treble contributed as a home design expert to the Bauer monthly lifestyle magazine, Inside Out as well as writing for each issue of HOMES+ from its launch (in 2014) to its closure (in 2018). Treble shares his knowledge through workshops and seminars to students of Interior Design at TAFE and ISCD (International School of Colour and Design).

Treble speaks about Interior Design and trends at Building Industry Expos, Fairs and Awards.

== Personal life ==
James Treble was born in Sydney, Australia in 1969. He grew up in the suburb of Carlingford. He travels extensively for work all over Australia, as well as overseas. Treble lives in Sydney with his partner, artist Sandro Nocentini, and their 2 children.

== Radio and television ==
In 2012, Treble was invited to be the interior design expert on TV lifestyle program The Living Room. On the show for seven seasons, since its beginning, Treble captivated the audiences through Design Challenges and Design Quickies.

In 2016, Treble happeared monthly on Sky News Real Estate, explaining live how and why interior design affects and increases property value. In 2017, Treble became the co-host of the Australian show Your Money – Auction Day (formerly Sky News Real Estate), hosting live every Saturday until the network closure in May 2019.

Between 2016 and 2018, Treble was live on radio with a weekly segment on 2UE. Offering home design and renovation advice, Treble answered live to queries from radio and online listeners.

In 2019, Treble accepted the role of co-presenter on the lifestyle TV show Open Homes Australia, broadcast on 9Life (free-to-air Ch 94).

In 2021, the brand new lifestyle show Renovate Or Rebuild debuted on TV channel 9Life with celebrity designers launched by the Nine Network TV show The Block, and James Treble as its host.

== Design awards ==
In 2013, Treble designed the Benton Home with Buildcraft Constructions, which achieves two Home Master Builders of Australia Excellence Awards.

In 2016, again with Buildcraft Constructions, the Aurora Home won a Master Builders of Australia Excellence Award as well as the Hills Building and Design Award for Residential Interior Design.

In 2019, Treble's work is finalist in six separate categories at the Housing Industry of Australia Awards and awarded three NSW winning positions with builders Eden Brae Homes (Best Display Home in its category) and Camelot Homes ([Best Spec Homes] and Best Kitchen in its category).

In 2020, the house designed with Camelot Homes also won the national title HIA Australian Spec Home of the Year.

In 2021, two homes designed with Eden Brae Homes were awarded three Master Builders Excellence Awards including NSW Best Display Home Overall At the same event two more homes designed by Treble, this time with Buildcraft Constructions received the MBA Excellence Award in their category.

In 2022, two of Treble's designed homes, both built by Eden Brae Homes, were awarded one Hunter Region HIA Excellence Award and one NSW MBA Excellence Award in their categories.
