= NBN News =

NBN News may refer to television news services operated by:

- NBN (TV station), owned and operated by WIN Corporation in Australia
- People's Television Network in the Philippines
