= Nocentini =

Nocentini is an Italian surname.

== Geographical distribution ==
As of 2014, 92.1% of all known bearers of the surname Nocentini were residents of Italy (frequency 1:9,860), 3.7% of France (1:267,099) and 2.9% of Brazil (1:1,059,649).

In Italy, the frequency of the surname was higher than national average (1:9,860) in the following regions:

1. Tuscany (1:681)
2. Umbria (1:4,770)

== People ==
- Sandro Nocentini (born 1966), Italian artist
- Rinaldo Nocentini (born 1977), Italian cyclist

== See also ==
- 269762 Nocentini, a minor planet
