= Sky News Election Channel =

- Country: Australia

Programming
- Language: English
- Picture format: 576i (SDTV 16:9); 1080i (HDTV)

Ownership
- Owner: Australian News Channel (News Corp Australia)
- Sister channels: News24; News24 Weather

History
- Launched: 1 May 2016; 10 years ago (2016–17 U.S. electoral cycle); 28 June 2024; 2 years ago (2024–25 electoral cycle)
- Replaced: Sky News Extra
- Replaced by: News24 World

Sky News Election Channel is an Australian 24-hour cable and satellite news channel available on the Foxtel platform, operated by News24. It launched on 1 May 2016, temporarily replacing A-PAC as a linear channel, dedicated to coverage of political events relating to the 2016 Australian federal election and American presidential election. Although the channel was originally planned to close on 29 November 2016 (with A-PAC returning as a broadcast channel), this was later postponed, and ultimately the channel did not cease broadcasting until 23 January 2017.

The channel was relaunched on 28 June 2024, temporarily replacing Sky News Extra as a linear channel, dedicated to coverage of political events relating to the 2024 United Kingdom general election, the French legislative election and the 2025 Australian federal election.

== Programming ==
Logo used from 2016 to 2017

The channel broadcast coverage of news conferences, policy announcements and events related to the Australian and American elections, as well as the United Kingdom referendum on remaining in the European Union. It also broadcast coverage and programming from Sky News' international partners including Sky News UK, C-SPAN, CBS News and ABC World News. For the 2024 relaunch, the channel also broadcasts coverage and programming from Sky News' international partners including Sky News UK, C-SPAN, CNN, Fox News, Reuters and AP.

Reruns of Sky News original programs including AM Agenda, PM Agenda, Paul Murray Live, Beattie & Reith and The Bolt Report were also part of the schedule.

It debuted in time to broadcast President Barack Obama's final address at the White House Correspondents' Association live as the channel's first major event.

The channel also broadcast coverage of the memorial service for Muhammad Ali on 11 June 2016.

The 2016 Walkley Awards were broadcast on both the Election Channel and A-PAC on 2 December 2016.

The revival channel debuted to broadcast the 2024 United States presidential debates live as the channel's first major event.

== Availability ==
The original channel was available on the Foxtel platform on two channels, 606 and 648, temporarily replacing News24 World on the latter which became available only online and through the Sky News Multiview service. Although the channel was only initially available in standard definition, a high definition simulcast of the channel launched on 15 May 2016.

The revival channel is available on the Foxtel platform on channel 603, temporarily replacing News24 World. It is also available on streaming services Flash and the Sky News website.
