= Carson Scott =

Australian journalist

- Education: University of Auckland
- Occupation: Journalist
- Years active: 1992 – present
- Known for: Journalism, TV presenting
- Website: Carson Scott profile

Carson Scott is an Australian journalist.

He has previously been a chief business correspondent for Sky News Australia and anchor for Sky News Business. He joined the channel in 2007 and also hosted a number of business-themed programs for the channel.

== Career ==
Scott is also well known for his enthusiasm when reporting on the monthly decision of the Reserve Bank of Australia to raise, lower or maintain interest rates, often reporting overly excited even when the bank decides to make no change.

He has also previously worked for Sky News in London. Scott was a presenter at Russia Today (now titled RT) from its launch in 2005, where he presented the program Business Today. Scott has criticised the Russian Government-funded channel for not being balanced and impartial, noting he had "countless heated editorial debates with [his] editor."

In 1995, Scott was awarded the Reader's Digest Investigative Journalism Award. In 2013, News Corp Australia named him one of the most influential men in news on Australian television.

Scott holds a graduate diploma in journalism, as well as degrees in both the arts and law. Scott was admitted to the bar in 2001.
