= News24 World =

Australian television channel

- Type: World News
- Country: Australia
- Broadcast area: Australia

Programming
- Language: English
- Picture format: 576i (SDTV 16:9); 1080i (HDTV)

Ownership
- Owner: News Corp Australia
- Parent: Australian News Channel
- Sister channels: News24; News24 Weather

History
- Launched: 20 January 2009; 17 years ago
- Replaced by: Sky News Election Channel (temporarilly as a linear channel during U.S. electoral cycles; 1 May 2016 – 23 January 2017; 28 June 2024 – 2025)
- Former names: Sky News Extra; A-PAC

Availability

Streaming media
- Online: news24.com.au/world
- Foxtel Now: 603

News24 World (formerly Sky News Extra and A-PAC /ˈeɪpæk/ AY-pak; Australian Public Affairs Channel) is an Australian 24-hour cable and satellite from around the world news channel owned by News Corp Australia.

== History ==
A-PAC logo used until May 2018

Former A-PAC logo

On 8 December 2008 it was announced that an Australian public affairs channel called A-SPAN (an acronym for Australian Subscription Public Affairs Network) would launch on 20 January 2009. The channel format is modelled on the American public affairs network C-SPAN. The news came after reports the ABC were considering launching a dedicated public affairs digital channel. Prior to launch the channel renamed as A-PAC (an acronym for Australian Public Affairs Channel). A-PAC is a not for profit independent channel funded by Austar and Foxtel, and produced by Sky News Australia.

The channel officially launched on the morning of 20 January 2009, with the inauguration of United States President Barack Obama airing on its first day, using a feed from U.S. cable channel C-SPAN.

Despite originally planned to occur on 26 April 2009, on 17 May 2009 A-PAC began broadcasting in 16:9 widescreen aspect ratio, along with sister channels Sky News Business Channel and Sky News Australia.

On 24 May 2012, Foxtel acquired Austar, which saw Foxtel become the sole stakeholder of A-PAC.

In February 2014, A-PAC had an on-air refresh, as well as launched a revamped website and a new weekly newsletter. In addition, Sky News presenter Helen Dalley was appointed as channel host.

In May 2018, A-PAC was rebranded to Sky News Extra and moved to channel 604 on Foxtel. The name and channel number change reflect on the additional programming it would have and to be in line with the other Sky News channels.

In March 2020, the channel was temporarily rebranded as Sky News COVID-19, as part of the networks' extended coverage of the ongoing 2019–20 coronavirus pandemic in Australia. The channel featured a combination of live and pre-recorded news bulletins, press conferences and segments relating to COVID-19 across the nation. Sky News COVID-19 was reverted to Sky News Extra on 1 June 2021.

On 25 July 2023, the channel was temporarily rebranded as Sky News: The Voice Debate, as part of the networks' coverage of the Indigenous Voice to Parliament. The channel featured a combination of live and pre-recorded news bulletins, press conferences and segments relating to the Indigenous Voice to Parliament across the nation. Sky News: The Voice Debate was reverted to Sky News Extra on 16 October 2023.

== Programming ==
News24 World content features live broadcasts from Australia's Parliament House in Canberra (including sittings of the House of Representatives, the Senate, parliamentary Committee meetings and political press conferences), the parliaments of New South Wales, Victoria and Queensland as well as sittings of the United States Congress, live broadcasts of speeches from the Australian National Press Club and a program which provides coverage of the New Zealand, Canadian and British parliaments. Material from the United Nations and the European Parliament is also aired.

== Availability ==
At launch News24 World was available via satellite and cable, then Internet streaming on its website, as well as on free-to-air digital television in Sydney as a trial.

From 1 May 2016, the service's linear channel was replaced by the original Sky News Election Channel (which also launched HD operations at the same time), resulting in the service only being available on the Sky News Multiview service and online. Although the service was originally planned to relaunch as a linear channel on 30 November 2016, this was later postponed, and ultimately the linear channel did not return until 24 January 2017 after the American presidential inauguration. Sky News Extra retained the HD feed originated by SNEC. On 28 June 2024, SNEC again returned over Sky News Extra's channel space on cable, Foxtel and satellite.
