= 9Rush =

Australian television channel

- Logo used since 2020
- Type: Men's programming
- Country: Australia
- Broadcast area: Sydney, Melbourne, Brisbane, Adelaide, Perth
- Network: Nine Network

Programming
- Language: English
- Picture format: 576i (SDTV) 16:9

Ownership
- Owner: Nine Entertainment
- Sister channels: Channel 9; 9HD; 9Gem; 9Go! 9Life; Extra

History
- Launched: 5 April 2020; 6 years ago

Links
- Website: 9now.com.au

Availability

Terrestrial
- TCN Sydney (DVB-T): 1059 @ 8 (191.5 MHz)
- GTV Melbourne (DVB-T): 1074 @ 8 (191.5 MHz)
- QTQ Brisbane/Sunshine Coast (DVB-T): 1030 @ 8 (191.5 MHz)
- NWS Adelaide (DVB-T): 1106 @ 8 (191.5 MHz)
- STW Perth/Mandurah (DVB-T): 1026 @ 8 (191.5 MHz)
- Freeview Nine metro (virtual): 96

Streaming media
- 9Now

9Rush is an Australian free-to-air digital television multichannel, launched by the Nine Network on 5 April 2020. The channel launched as a joint venture with Warner Bros. Discovery Asia-Pacific (which also supplied its programming) and is broadcast on Channel 96 across Nine's metropolitan markets. However, by August 2025, WBD sold its stake in the joint venture following its sale of Three in New Zealand the previous month. The target audience are males between the ages of 25 and 54.

In March 2022, Discovery launched the similarly-named Rush channel in New Zealand, which shares some programming with 9Rush.

== Programming ==
9Rush majorly broadcasts adventure and high adrenaline reality programming. Programming shows come from Warner Bros. Discovery, including shows from United States, United Kingdom and Canada.

=== Current programming ===
- Alaska: The Last Frontier
- Bear Grylls: Face the Wild
- Bering Sea Gold
- Cops UK
- Diesel Brothers
- Dirty Jobs Down Under
- Garage Squad
- Gold Rush
- Homestead Rescue
- How It's Made
- How the Universe Works
- Kindig Customs
- The Last Alaskans
- Live PD
- Man vs. Wild
- Million Dollar Car Hunters
- Million Dollar Garage
- Misfit Garage
- Naked and Afraid
- Overhaulin'
- Railroad Alaska
- Resto My Ride Australia
- Running Wild with Bear Grylls
- Tanked
- Top Gear
- Traffic Cops
- Treasure Quest: Snake Island
- Treehouse Masters
- Shifting Gears
- Street Outlaws
- Wheeler Dealers

== See also ==
- Nine Network
- 9HD
- 9Gem
- 9Go!
- 9Life
- Extra
- 9Go!HD
- Warner Bros. Discovery
- Rush (New Zealand)
