= Extra (Australian TV channel) =

Australian television channel

- Logo used between 2012 and 2018, then used again since 2020
- Type: Alternative programming
- Country: Australia
- Broadcast area: Sydney, Melbourne, Brisbane, Adelaide, Perth
- Network: Nine Network

Programming
- Language: English
- Picture format: 576i (SDTV) 16:9
- Timeshift service: Extra 2 (2013–2015)

Ownership
- Owner: Nine Entertainment
- Sister channels: Channel 9; 9HD; 9Gem; 9Go! 9Life; 9Rush

History
- Launched: 26 March 2012; 14 years ago 1 October 2020; 6 years ago (relaunch)
- Closed: 24 September 2018; 8 years ago
- Replaced by: DTT carriage of Your Money, subsequently replaced by HD version of 9Gem after 17 May 2019

Availability

Terrestrial
- TCN Sydney (DVB-T): 1060 @ 8 (191.5 MHz)
- GTV Melbourne (DVB-T): 1075 @ 8 (191.5 MHz)
- QTQ Brisbane/Sunshine Coast (DVB-T): 1031 @ 8 (191.5 MHz)
- Freeview Nine metro (virtual): 97

Extra is an Australian free-to-air television channel launched on 26 March 2012. It broadcasts mainly infomercials, religion, community, educational, multi-cultural programming as well as stories taken from Nine Network programs including A Current Affair, Getaway, Today and Today Extra.

== History ==
On the Nine Network, the Extra brand was first used in Brisbane on a television news program, that was axed on 18 June 2009.

Extra launched on 26 March 2012 on channel 94 in Sydney, Melbourne, Brisbane, Darwin and Northern NSW & Gold Coast on channel 84.

Extra replaced WIN Corporation's datacast channel Gold, in both Adelaide and Perth, after both were purchased by Nine Entertainment in 2013. Nine Adelaide launched Extra on 1 July 2013 while Nine Perth launched Extra on 30 September 2013, both along with the timeshift service Extra 2.

On 26 November 2015, Nine's new lifestyle channel 9Life launched in metropolitan areas on channel 94. As a result, Extra, which was on channel 94 at the time, was moved to channel 95, replacing its timeshift service Extra 2. However, Extra remained in broadcast on regional Nine owned NBN on channels 84 in place of 9Life.

On 19 January 2016, Extra replaced WIN's five-hour timeshift of their datacasting channel Gold titled Gold 2 on channel 82. When WIN and NBN launched 9Life in March 2016, their channel listings were reshuffled to mirror Nine's metropolitan listings which put Extra on channel 85 (later on channel 86) in both listings.

Extra ceased broadcasting on 24 September 2018 with the channel space to be occupied by Your Money, a joint venture business channel between Nine and Australian News Channel. Promotional trailers for Your Money were shown during the period until 6:00 am Eastern on 1 October 2018, when the new channel came on air. After Your Money was closed down on 17 May 2019, its DTT channel space was taken by a HD version of 9Gem.

The channel was re-launched 1 October 2020 on digital channel 97 (87 in Northern NSW) after 2 years off the air.

== Availability ==
Extra is available in standard definition in metropolitan areas on channel 97 including, owned-and-operated stations by Nine: TCN Sydney, GTV Melbourne, QTQ Brisbane, NWS Adelaide and STW Perth.

NTD in Darwin and NBN in northern New South Wales formerly had Extra available. However, due to both stations being acquired by WIN in 2026, Extra was removed from the Darwin multiplex on 23 September 2026 and the NBN multiplex on 28 October 2026, both coinciding with the removal of MPEG-2 services in those regions.

=== Extra 2 ===
On 28 March 2013, Extra 2 was launched on channel 95 and channel 85 in NBN areas as a five-hour timeshift of Extra. As a result, the quality of sister channel 9Gem was cut.

In Adelaide, Extra 2 became available on 1 July 2013, the day Nine took over control of Nine Adelaide (NWS), from the WIN Corporation, along with the main shopping channel, Extra.

In Perth, Extra 2 launched, replacing then Nine Perth owner's WIN Corporation's Gold 2, on 30 September 2013, the day Nine took control of the Perth station, along with the main shopping channel, Extra.

Extra 2 was closed in metropolitan areas on 26 November 2015 when it was replaced by Extra, which had been moved from channel 94 due to the launch of 9Life. However, Extra and Extra 2 both remained available on Nine-owned NBN until 9Life was launched on NBN in March 2016.

Prior to the 9Life launch in NBN areas, Extra and Extra 2 was available on channel 84 and 85 respectively.

== See also ==
- Nine Network
- 9HD
- 9Gem
- 9Go!
- 9Life
- 9Rush
