= 9Gem =

Australian television channel

- Logo used since 2015
- Type: Movies • sport • general entertainment
- Country: Australia
- Broadcast area: Sydney, Melbourne, Brisbane, Adelaide, Perth, Darwin, Northern NSW and Gold Coast, Regional QLD, Southern NSW/ACT, Broken Hill NSW, Griffith NSW, Regional VIC, Mildura VIC, Tasmania, Spencer Gulf SA, Eastern SA, Regional WA, Remote Central & Eastern
- Network: Nine Network

Programming
- Language: English
- Picture format: 1080i HDTV (Note: HD simulcast available in metropolitan and non-SCA regional areas.) (downscaled to 16:9 576i for the SDTV feed)

Ownership
- Owner: Nine Entertainment
- Sister channels: Channel 9; 9HD; 9Go! 9Life; 9Rush; Extra

History
- Launched: 26 September 2010; 16 years ago
- Replaced: 9HD (HD channel space; 2008–2010, later relaunched on 26 November 2015); Your Money (HD simulcast)
- Former names: GEM (2010–2015)

Links
- Website: 9now.com.au

Availability

Terrestrial
- TCN Sydney (DVB-T): 1058 @ 8 (191.5 MHz)
- GTV Melbourne (DVB-T): 1073 @ 8 (191.5 MHz)
- QTQ Brisbane/Sunshine Coast (DVB-T): 1029 @ 8 (191.5 MHz)
- NWS Adelaide (DVB-T): 1105 @ 8 (191.5 MHz)
- STW Perth/Mandurah (DVB-T): 1025 @ 8 (191.5 MHz)
- Freeview Nine-owned transmitters: Channel 92 (HD) Channel 95 (HD)
- Freeview WIN Regional QLD, Southern NSW & ACT, Northern NSW/Gold Coast, Griffith NSW, Regional VIC, Mildura VIC/Sunraysia, Tasmania, Mount Gambier/Riverland, Darwin NT, Remote/Regional WA (virtual): Channel 81 (91 Darwin)
- Seven Spencer Gulf SA/Broken Hill NSW (virtual): Channel 82
- Imparja remote: Channel 90

Streaming media
- 9Now

9Gem is an Australian free-to-air digital television multichannel, launched by the Nine Network in September 2010. The channel provides general entertainment and movie programming, from which the original name "GEM" is derived.

== History ==
The launch of 9Gem was originally planned for 24 September 2010 at midday, but was rescheduled due to "technical issues" at Nine's playout centre to Sunday 26 September 2010 at 6am.

Nine Network CEO David Gyngell stated "GEM is part of Nine's strategy to create a cluster of complementary channels to cover all key audiences." The channel is aimed at everyone, including lifestyle programs and movies, with additional programming drawn from a combination of new shows and other shows previously aired on its sister channels Nine and GO!. The launch of GEM followed the success of GO!.

On 27 January 2014, 9Gem stopped using the Supertext logo and switched to Nine's closed captioning logo.

=== 2015 rebrand ===
On 26 November 2015, the Nine Network introduced a network-wide rebrand of all of its digital channels with GEM being renamed "9Gem". Additionally, due to the rebroadcast of 9HD on channel 90, 9Gem was moved to channel 92 and converted from HD to SD. On 16 December 2015, 9Gem's on-air theme was changed for a continuous design across all of its channels. This included a new look for program listings, program advertisements and promos.

=== 2016 regional media shakeup ===
Nine announced that it had signed a new affiliation deal with Southern Cross Austereo on 29 April 2016, replacing WIN Television as the primary Nine affiliate starting 1 July 2016. Consequently, 9Gem would be broadcast by Southern Cross into Regional Queensland, Southern NSW/ACT, Regional Victoria and Tasmania on channel 52. Spencer Gulf SA/Broken Hill NSW remained unchanged, with 9Gem on channel 80.

=== Return of high definition ===
Channel 95, part of Nine's metropolitan DVB-T multiplex, was vacated after Your Money was closed down on 17 May 2019. An MPEG-4 HD feed of 9Gem was first broadcast in Darwin on 14 June 2019 on channel 95, then in Perth, Brisbane and Adelaide on 19 June 2019, followed by Sydney and Melbourne on 20 June 2019. On 1 August, NBN upgraded 9Gem to HD in Northern New South Wales and the Gold Coast. The HD simulcast was brought in ahead of their broadcast of the 2019 Ashes and the backend of the 2019 Cricket World Cup. This is the first time since 2015 that 9Gem was broadcast in HD. However, the SD broadcast continued on channel 92.

=== 2021 regional media shakeup ===
On 12 March 2021, the Nine Network announced that they have re-affiliated with WIN Television so 9Gem is now on channel 81.

It was revealed on 22 March 2023 that WIN Television would be launching 9GemHD in late July 2023. The launch date was later confirmed to be on 27 July 2023. By doing this, WIN upgraded the then-current SD 9Gem broadcast on channel 81 to HD, on the same channel number.

== Programming ==
The channel targets a broad range of viewers, broadcasting programs from Australia, New Zealand, the United Kingdom, Canada, and the United States, and complementing existing programming on Nine and 9Go!.

Programs aired on the channel are female-skewed, but also range from a mix of genres, including crime, lifestyle, drama, classic sitcoms, comedies, live sport and repeated high definition or silver screen films. The launch of the network is led by Showtime programs, The Big C and a new series of Weeds. Other shows include Birds of a Feather, Bless This House, Conan, the CSI franchise, The Golden Girls, Law & Order, and more. Australian programs include Alive and Cooking, McLeod's Daughters, What's Good For You?, Amazing Medical Stories, Sea Patrol, Getaway and The Taste.

The network also has ongoing content new and classic film and television brands from Warner Bros. Pictures, Village Roadshow Pictures and Metro-Goldwyn-Mayer.

=== News ===
News programming is generally not carried on 9Gem, but it previously aired Nine News at 7 from 5 August to 27 October 2013. The bulletin was launched in response to the launch of Seven News at 7.00 on 7two.

On previous occasions, 9Gem aired replays of Nine's Newsbreak that air on the main Nine channel and from 9Go!.

=== Sports ===
9Gem has also aired live sporting broadcasts in various markets including various Rugby Union World Cup matches in 2011, as well as portions of Nine's Cricket telecast (whilst the 6:00pm news airs on the main Nine channel). Since 2012, 9Gem has televised live National Rugby League (NRL) matches into Victoria, Western Australia, South Australia and Tasmania, therefore putting it head-to-head with Seven/7mate's live Australian Football League (AFL) coverage in those states, and eliminating the need for Melbourne Storm fans, especially in Victoria, to have to wait until after midnight to watch their local team play (occasionally, Channel Nine Melbourne will televise Melbourne Storm matches in these timeslots on the main Nine channel, rather than 9Gem). Starting in Round 4 of the 2014 NRL season, for yet unexplained reasons 9Gem stopped showing the NRL on Friday nights and Sunday afternoons live into Adelaide, with the coverage for all games on Nine reverting to the after midnight 'graveyard shift'. As the change was unannounced and in Adelaide only (the rest of South Australia still receives the live coverage), this has angered many fans in the city, both South Australians and those who have re-located from NSW or Qld.

In 2011, Nine also showed both matches of the Bledisloe Cup live on 9Gem into Victoria, Western Australia, South Australia and Tasmania whilst in New South Wales and Queensland it was live on Nine. 9Gem simulcast Nine's coverage of the 2012 London Olympic Games live in High Definition, with the exception of Friday nights between 7.30–9.30pm where NRL was telecast nationally. On rare occasions, Nine's Newsbreaks were also occasionally simulcast in HD with the main channel, while 9Gem is off air.

9Gem broadcast the 2013 Ashes series for the first time on Australian television in HD. The broadcasts were hosted from Nine's Sydney studios by Tim Gilbert and former Australian captain Mark Taylor, with pictures and commentary provided by host broadcaster Sky Sports. During Gem's telecast of The Ashes, the NRL was shown on sister channel 9Go! in Melbourne, Adelaide, Perth and Tasmania on Friday nights when the cricket was scheduled. 9Gem showed all matches of the 2015 World Club Series. 9Gem also broadcast every match of the 2015 Ashes series from the United Kingdom.

In 2015 9Gem broadcast 17 matches of the 2015 Rugby World Cup including every Wallabies match and all the finals. 2013 until 2015 9Gem has broadcast cricket matches of the Matador BBQs One-Day Cup. In late 2015 9Gem also started to show 1 weekly NBL game on Sunday Afternoons, being hosted by Bill Baxter.

From February 2017, 9Gem will broadcast a Saturday night double-header of Suncorp Super Netball. It will also televise every Australian Diamonds netball international fixture.

== Availability ==
9Gem is available in standard definition and High Definition in metropolitan areas and regional areas through Nine Network owned-and-operated stations: TCN Sydney, GTV Melbourne, QTQ Brisbane, NWS Adelaide and STW Perth. It is also available through affiliated stations WIN Southern NSW/ACT, NTD Darwin, NBN Northern New South Wales, GTS/BKN Broken Hill NSW, AMN Griffith NSW, VTV Regional VIC, STV Mildura, RTQ Regional QLD, TVT Tasmania, GTS/BKN Spencer Gulf SA, SES/RTS Eastern SA, WOW Regional WA and Remote Central & Eastern.

== Logo and identity history ==
When 9Gem was launched on 26 September 2010, it was given a "glassy" logo inspired by Nine's logo at the time with a purple colour, in contrast to Nine's trademark blue. Its slogan, Welcome to GEM, was also another nod to its parent channel and its slogan Welcome Home. Following the channel's rebrand as "9Gem" on 26 November 2015, the channel received a completely new logo, with its appearance inspired by sister channel 9Go!'s previous logo, featuring the famous "nine dots" from Nine's logo. WIN Television has a variant of the 9Gem logo with the aforementioned channel's logo above 9Gem's 2010–2015 logo.

26 November 2015 – present

=== Identity history ===
- 26 September 2010 – 26 November 2015: Welcome to GEM
- 26 September 2010 – 26 November 2015 (Alternative): Treat Yourself
- 2011: Your Time, Your Choice, Your GEM
- 26 November 2015 – present: Characters Belong
