= SES/RTS =

Television stations in South Australia

SES / RTS

- SES: Mount Gambier, South Australia RTS: Riverland, South Australia; Australia
- Channels: Digital: SES: 32 (UHF) RTS: 35 (UHF)
- Branding: Seven, Nine

Programming
- Language: English
- Network: WIN Television
- Affiliations: SES/RTS: Nine; SDS/RDS: Seven

Ownership
- Owner: WIN Corporation Pty Ltd; (WIN Television SA Pty Ltd)
- Sister stations: MGS/LRS

History
- First air date: SES: March 25, 1966; RTS: November 26, 1976
- Former channel numbers: Analog: SES: 8 (VHF); RTS: 5A (VHF)
- Former affiliations: Independent (1966–2003); Nine (2004–2007)
- Call sign meaning: SES: South; East; South Australia; RTS: Riverland; Television; South Australia; SDS: SES; Digital; South Australia; RDS: RTS; Digital; South Australia

Technical information
- Licensing authority: Australian Communications and Media Authority
- ERP: SES: 200 kW; RTS: 240 kW
- HAAT: SES: 379 m RTS: 180 m
- Transmitter coordinates: SES: 37°36′8″S 140°28′58″E; RTS: 34°27′52″S 140°32′1″E

Links
- Website: www.wintv.com.au

SES and RTS are Australian television stations licensed to, and serving the rural south-east portion of South Australia, including Mount Gambier, the Limestone Coast, Renmark and the Riverland. They began as two independent stations, SES-8 and RTS-5A, and are part of the WIN Television network.

== History ==
SES/RTS was originally two individual stations serving different regions. SES-8 originally planned to launch on 20 November 1965. Due to a tensioning wire being snapped on a 500-foot transmitter mast at Mount Burr, sending the tower crashing to the ground and containing 200 tonnes of steel, SES-8 instead commenced transmissions on 25 March 1966 at 7:30 pm, opened by Dr. Jim Forbes, who also helped open national station ABGS-1 in December 1965, serving Mount Gambier and south-east South Australia. Its first program was a 25-minute special, Tonight's the Night, fronted by SES-8's first newsreader Lewis Hobba. It was followed by a 5-minute news service, Peter Paul And Mary In Australia and the 1958 film The Big Country. It closed for the day at 11:32 pm after the Closing Thoughts. RTS-5A began on 26 November 1976 serving Loxton, Renmark and the Riverland, and opened with introductions from Julie Blyth and John Harvey. The 1965 film The Great Race started at 6:05 pm, before RTS' official opening at 8:40 pm. Blyth and Harvey returned to host the official opening, with the Minister for Post and Telecommunications, Eric Robinson, doing the honours by declaring RTS open. The evening's programs concluded with the 1961 film The Guns of Navarone, which was broadcast at 9:20 pm.

On 9 November 1998, parts of the RTS-5A studio were destroyed by a fire. RTS was back on air less than seven hours later, transmitting test patterns. Station manager Wendy Mudge stated that "The old studio will be torn down to make way for a new one". By this time, RTS was bought by SES, but it continued to produce a local news bulletin, and identified on-air as 5A.

In June 1999, WIN Television acquired SES and RTS and integrated them into the WIN Television network in Mount Gambier in October 1999 and Riverland in November 1999, with the branding now matching that of the Nine Network. In December 2003, 24-hour transmission commenced.

Prior to 2004, SES/RTS were the only commercial television stations broadcasting in Mount Gambier and the south east of South Australia, respectively. The stations broadcast a mixture of programs derived from the Seven Network, the Nine Network and Network 10. However, in January 2004, WIN Television introduced a sole Network Ten affiliate, WIN Ten (MGS/LRS), becoming the second commercial television station in the region. Following this, SES/RTS became sole Nine Network affiliates, only sport programs (particularly AFL matches) being acquired from the Seven Network.

In October 2007, SES/RTS became a sole Seven Network affiliates as the main WIN stations in South Australia.

SES and RTS, along with GTS/BKN, switched off its analog signal on 15 December 2010 at 9am. SES and RTS planned to start providing the digital multi-channels GO!, GEM, 7TWO, 7mate, One and Eleven, expanding to the south east area from 11 November 2011, with other areas completed by early 2012.

On 1 July 2016, WIN Seven (SES/RTS) and WIN Nine (SDS/RDS), continued to align with the Seven Network and the Nine Network respectively, at the same time of the start of its affiliation with Network Ten on WIN Ten (MGS/LRS).

On 1 July 2021, the TV channels Seven SA (SES/RTS), Nine SA (SDS/RDS), and WIN SA (MGS/LRS) underwent a rebranding to align with their new program supply agreement with the Seven Network, the Nine Network, and Network 10, respectively. As of that date, Seven SA and Nine SA continued their affiliation with the Seven Network and the Nine Network, respectively, and there were no changes to their network affiliations. WIN SA (MGS/LRS), however, changed its name to 10 SA and remained affiliated with Network 10.

Sometime between July 2021 and June 2025, the affiliations of SES/RTS and SDS/RDS were swapped, placing Nine on SES/RTS and Seven on SDS/RDS.

=== Channel Nine ===
WIN in South Australia, like its services in other states, was primarily an affiliate of the Nine Network. However, in September 2007, WIN Television announced plans to convert the station into a sole Seven Network affiliate, due to a disagreement with the Nine Network's owner, PBL Media, over affiliation advertising revenue. As a result of the switch, alongside the local news updates, WIN SA began broadcasting Seven News and Today Tonight from SAS in Adelaide rather than Nine's, as well as Seven's national newscasts and Sunrise.

On 7 August 2009, WIN recommenced broadcasting Channel Nine as a digital only service (callsign SDS in Spencer Gulf and RDS in the Riverland), would be starting on 4 October 2009. The channel is a direct feed of NWS-9 Adelaide, but with local commercials.

After SES's and RTS's analogue signal was switched off, the three services were rebranded as Seven SA, WIN and Ten SA. On 1 July 2016, they rebranded as Seven SA, Nine SA, and WIN respectively, to represent a change in affiliation within the WIN Network. On 1 July 2021, they rebranded as Seven SA, Nine SA, and 10 SA respectively, to represent a change in affiliation within the WIN Network.

=== End of local advertising on Seven through WIN and Seven Network switchoff, and return ===
On 30 June 2024, WIN ended its advertising agreement with the Seven Network, ending the ability for local advertisers to book advertising on Seven through WIN. Since 1 July 2024, the station has been a full-time dirty feed of SAS-7 Adelaide complete with Adelaide commercials. Local commercials continued to be inserted on Nine SA and 10 SA.

On 15 June 2025, WIN Television was unable to reach an agreement with the Seven Network to continue providing Seven channels in the Mount Gambier/Riverland/Loxton regions. On 16 June 2025, WIN Television announced they will cease broadcasting Seven Network programming into Mount Gambier/Riverland/Loxton beginning 1 July 2025. The Seven Network was back on air on 3 July 2025 after a new broadcast deal with WIN Television.

== Programming ==
Seven SA broadcasts programs from the Seven Network, including the Adelaide edition of Seven News while Nine SA broadcasts programs from the Nine Network, including the Adelaide edition of Nine News and A Current Affair. The station also carries the Adelaide feeds of 7two, 7mate, 9Go!, 9Gem and 9Life.

== News output ==
Up until October 2010, two separate bulletins were produced for the Mount Gambier and Riverland areas.

Then until February 2013, WIN News produced and broadcast a regional news bulletin for the combined SES/RTS region each weekday evening. Reporters and camera crews were based within the area at newsrooms in Mount Gambier and Loxton with the bulletin latterly broadcast from NWS-9's studios in Adelaide.

The last regional program was broadcast on Friday 15 February 2013 with the news service ceasing operations after the weekend, and ten staff at the Mount Gambier and Loxton newsrooms made redundant.

In 2015, WIN introduced short local news updates for the two areas, produced in co-operation with The Border Watch and the Murray Pioneer. The updates, presented by Britt Ditterich, air on all three WIN services during the 6pm timeslot (during Seven News for Seven SA, 10 News First and The Project for 10 SA and Nine News for Nine SA). All 3 WIN channels also carry the SA and national editions of news programs of their respective partner networks, plus state and national updates from the latter as well as The Project (10 SA only).
