= Nine Network =

Australian television network

- Logo used since 2008
- Type: Free-to-air television network
- Country: Australia
- Broadcast area: Sydney; Melbourne; Brisbane; Adelaide; Perth
- Affiliates: WIN Television; (Regional Queensland; Northern NSW & Gold Coast; Southern NSW & ACT; Griffith; Regional Victoria; Mildura; Tasmania; Eastern SA; Western Australia; Darwin); Seven Media Group (Spencer Gulf & Broken Hill); Imparja Television (Remote Central & Eastern Australia)
- Headquarters: 1 Denison Street, North Sydney

Programming
- Language: English
- Picture format: 1080i HDTV (Note: Available on 9HD and 9Gem for metropolitan and non-SCA regional areas.)

Ownership
- Owner: Frank Packer (1956–1974); Kerry Packer (Publishing and Broadcasting Limited) (1974–1987, 1990–2006); Alan Bond (1987–1990); PBL Media (2006–2011); Nine Entertainment (2011–present)
- Sister channels: 9Gem; 9Go!; 9Life; 9Rush; Extra

History
- Launched: 16 September 1956; 70 years ago
- Founder: Frank Packer
- Former names: National Television Network (1956–1967); National Nine Network (1967–1988)

Links
- Website: 9now.com.au

Availability

Terrestrial
- TCN Sydney (DVB-T): 1057 @ 8 (191.5 MHz)
- GTV Melbourne (DVB-T): 1072 @ 8 (191.5 MHz)
- QTQ Brisbane/Sunshine Coast (DVB-T): 1028 @ 8 (191.5 MHz)
- NWS Adelaide (DVB-T): 1104 @ 8 (191.5 MHz)
- STW Perth/Mandurah (DVB-T): 1024 @ 8 (191.5 MHz)
- Freeview Nine metro, Darwin & remote (virtual): 9/91
- Freeview Nine regional (virtual): 8/81
- Freeview 9HD (virtual): 90/80

Streaming media
- 9Now (Australia only)

The Nine Network (commonly known as Channel Nine or simply Nine) is an Australian commercial free-to-air television network. It is owned by parent company Nine Entertainment and is one of the five main free-to-air television networks in Australia.

As of 2025, Nine Network is the second-rated television network and primary channel in Australia, behind the Seven Network but ahead of ABC TV, Network 10 and SBS TV.

== History ==
=== Origins ===
Nine Network's first broadcasting station was launched in Sydney, New South Wales, as TCN-9 on 16 September 1956 by The Daily Telegraph owner Frank Packer.

John Godson introduced the station and former advertising executive Bruce Gyngell presented the first program, This Is Television (so becoming the first person to appear on Australian television). Later that year, GTV-9 in Melbourne commenced transmissions to broadcast the 1956 Summer Olympics, later forming the National Television Network alongside QTQ-9 in Brisbane in 1959 and NWS-9 in Adelaide, the basis of the current Nine Network, in 1959. Before its formation, TCN-9 was then affiliated with HSV-7 (because alongside the Seven Network, they were both Australia's first television stations, having opened in 1956), and GTV-9's sister affiliate was ATN-7.

The network, by 1967, had begun calling itself the National Nine Network, and became simply Nine Network Australia in 1988. Kerry Packer inherited the company after his father's death in 1974. Before the official conversion to color on 1 March 1975, it was the first Australian television station to regularly screen programs in color with the first program to use it premiering in 1971, the very year NTD-8 in Darwin commenced.

The New South Wales Rugby Football League (NSWRFL) grand final of 1967 became the first football grand final of any code to be televised live nationally. Nine Network paid $5,000 (equivalent to $71,000 in 2022) to attain the broadcasting rights.

Nine Network station STW-9 Perth, which opened in 1965, became owned-and-operated station when Alan Bond purchased the network for one billion dollars in 1987, a deal that became effective after government approvals in 1988. However, in 1989, Bond Media sold the station to Sunraysia Television for A$95 million, due to the federal cross-media ownership laws which restricted the level of national reach for media owners. Nine, which then also included Channel 9 in Brisbane, fell back into the hands of Kerry Packer after Alan Bond's bankruptcy in 1992.

On 1 March 2011, GTV 9 Melbourne moved from 22 Bendigo Street, Richmond, to 717 Bourke Street, Docklands. 22 Bendigo Street started out as the Wertheim Piano Factory, then became the Heinz Soup Factory, then GTV9. The building in Bendigo Street still stands, now as luxury apartments.

=== 1977–2006 ===
Nine began using the slogan "Let Us Be The One" (based on The Carpenters' song Let Me Be the One and modelled on the ABC campaign used at the time in the United States) in 1977 and became the number-one free-to-air network in Australia; its National Nine News became the most-watched news service. In 1978, Nine switched its slogan to "Still the One" (modelled on the campaign used by ABC in the United States and using the Orleans song Still the One), which lasted until a decline in ratings in January 2006. During the 1980s, Nine's ratings peaked. From 1999 to 2001, the network began losing ground to the Seven network in news and entertainment, but received a boost after the coverage of the 11 September attacks in 2001. By 1988, the network was re-branded to its current branding. The death of CEO Kerry Packer in 2005 triggered more problems for the network. Digital terrestrial television was introduced on 1 January 2001.

=== 2006–2008 ===
Nine stayed strong throughout 2003–04, winning 77 out of 80 ratings weeks across those two years (with Network Ten claiming the other three weeks), but was hit hard when Seven introduced a new line-up in 2005, though Nine finished ahead of Seven that year. Meanwhile, National Nine News was overtaken by Seven News for the first time ever, while Today was beaten by Seven's fledgling Sunrise program. In 2006, Nine continued on its downward trend, losing most news weeks to Seven News and just winning the year thanks to its coverage of the 2006 Commonwealth Games. To try to revitalize the network in its 50th anniversary, Nine adopted a new, but critically received, logo that removed the nine dots, which had been part of the network's identity since 1969. In May 2007, Nine partially re-introduced the Nine dots, which resulted in the square logo changing into a three-dimensional (3-D) cube that rotates, with the dots visible on every second side of the cube.

After a period of declining ratings, David Gyngell returned to the job of CEO in October 2007, succeeding Eddie McGuire.

In 2007, despite several hits, Seven won the whole year by a significant margin. The Seven Network had won 38 weeks, whereas Nine Network only won two.

The Network expanded into Northern NSW with the acquisition of NBN Television in May 2007. However, NBN was retained as an independent Nine affiliate following the acquisition until 2016. Deborah Wright, who had been working in various roles for the station, was promoted to CEO.

=== 2008–2014 ===
In 2008, as part of a major relaunch, the network dropped the blue box, and reinstated its nine dots in its logo, with a CGI look. After losing viewers to Seven News, Nine relaunched its news service as Nine News, which managed to win more weeks over Seven in the first half of 2008. Nine also launched a break-out hit, Underbelly, which attracted over 2.5 million viewers in its first season. Nine tried to attract younger demographics, so while Seven went on to win the ratings year in total people, Nine was rated the number one network in the key 18–49 and 25–54 demographics.

In March 2008, Nine Network launched and debuted a high-definition channel called Nine HD on channel 90 until 2010.

In 2009, Nine started relatively strongly due to the top-rating Australian drama Underbelly: A Tale of Two Cities and the Twenty20 Cricket series until Nine lost the rights in 2018 but could not hold its audience after Network Ten's MasterChef Australia became a hit. Nine became inconsistent with scheduling and removal of programmes. Nine also launched a number of reality shows, including Ladette to Lady, Wipeout Australia, HomeMADE, Australia's Perfect Couple, and The Apprentice Australia, in the hope of achieving the same success other networks had with the genre. All the new formats underperformed in the ratings and did not help the network establish any stable local content. Nine also expanded its news strand with the reintroduction of a late-night bulletin (for its owned-and-operated stations), an extended morning bulletin and weekend editions of Today. The flagship 6:00 pm state bulletins continued to fall in the ratings, though its Melbourne bulletin remained competitive, being the only market to win any weeks against Seven News.

In August 2009, Nine launched and debuted its own digital multi-channel called GO! (now 9Go!) on Channel 99, primarily aimed at a younger demographic. The shares from 9Go! contributed to Nine's weekly shares and allowed it to enjoy several weeks of weekly ratings wins. In September, the network took on a new slogan, "Welcome Home", and revamped its graphic package. With the resurgence of Nine News, growth of Today, stabilisation of 60 Minutes and a new programme line-up consisting of Hey Hey It's Saturday, Underbelly and Sea Patrol, Nine enjoyed more ratings success.

In 2010, Nine obtained the rights to exclusive coverage of the Sydney New Year's Eve fireworks. 9Go! won the year in digital shares only. On 26 September 2010, Nine launched and debuted their third digital channel GEM (now 9Gem) (an acronym of General Entertainment and Movies) on Channel 90. In 2011, Nine Network announced a new "Home of Comedy" line-up with comedy shows such as Two and a Half Men, The Big Bang Theory, and other American sitcoms, along with the launch of a live comedy show Ben Elton Live From Planet Earth, which was cancelled after only three episodes due to low ratings. Nine also brought back This Is Your Life with Eddie McGuire as host, although the series was cancelled after airing four episodes. Nine Network had success in the ratings in the second half of 2011 with The Block, Underbelly: Razor, and The Celebrity Apprentice Australia. The highly anticipated return of a revamped ninth season of Two and a Half Men proved a huge success for the network, generating 2.3 million viewers and dominating the week as top program. The return of new episodes of the popular sitcom The Big Bang Theory was also a huge success for the network, scoring high figures consistently week after week and dominating the evening as top program. Despite this, Nine Network finished in second place in the ratings again in 2011 on 19.6%, behind the Seven Network (23.1%) and ahead of the Network Ten (15.9%), ABC TV (12.2%) and SBS (4.6%).

On 24 November 2011, Nine Network announced the line-up for 2012, with a focus on reality programs, including an Australian version of The Voice, the return of Big Brother, Excess Baggage, and The Celebrity Apprentice Australia. Nine Network also aired coverage of the 2012 Summer Olympics in London. A new morning show, Mornings, replaced the departure of Kerri-Anne Kennerley's self-titled show, after nine years on air. The program, now called Today Extra, is hosted by Sylvia Jeffreys and David Campbell.

On 26 March 2012, Nine Network launched and debuted Extra, a new channel aimed at delivering home shopping, brand funded, religious, community, educational and multi-cultural programming content created by advertisers. Its timeshift channel, Extra 2, launched on 28 March 2013 on channel 95 and channel 85 in NBN areas as a five-hour timeshift. As a result, the quality of sister channel 9Gem was cut.

On 15 April 2012, Nine Network new rebrand visual identity for Channel Nine logo with the enhanced colour palette, which uses lighter shades of blue and more white gradients, including colour from the brand identity, this was part identity since 2002 Nine Network logo.

It was reported on 31 May 2012 that the Australian telecommunications company Telstra and WIN Television Network CEO, Bruce Gordon, are considering making a takeover bid for Nine Entertainment. The network currently is trying to fight off administration as it deals with a debt exceeding A$3.3 billion.

It was reported on 3 June 2013 that Nine Network would immediately purchase Adelaide affiliate NWS-9 from the WIN Corporation as part of a deal to secure international cricket television rights. On 3 July 2013, it was reported that Nine would exercise an option to also buy STW-9 from WIN Corporation. Both purchases have resulted in these stations being, once again, O&O stations of the network for the first time since the 1980s.

On 8 November 2013, FIXPlay was merged into Jump-in, later renamed to 9Jumpin in May 2014, integrating catch-up TV with interactive social media.

As of 10 December 2013, Nine no longer broadcasts on analogue TV and is now only available through digital TV or digital set-top box.

On 27 January 2014, Nine Network have stopped using the Supertext logo and have switched to their own Closed Captioning logo.

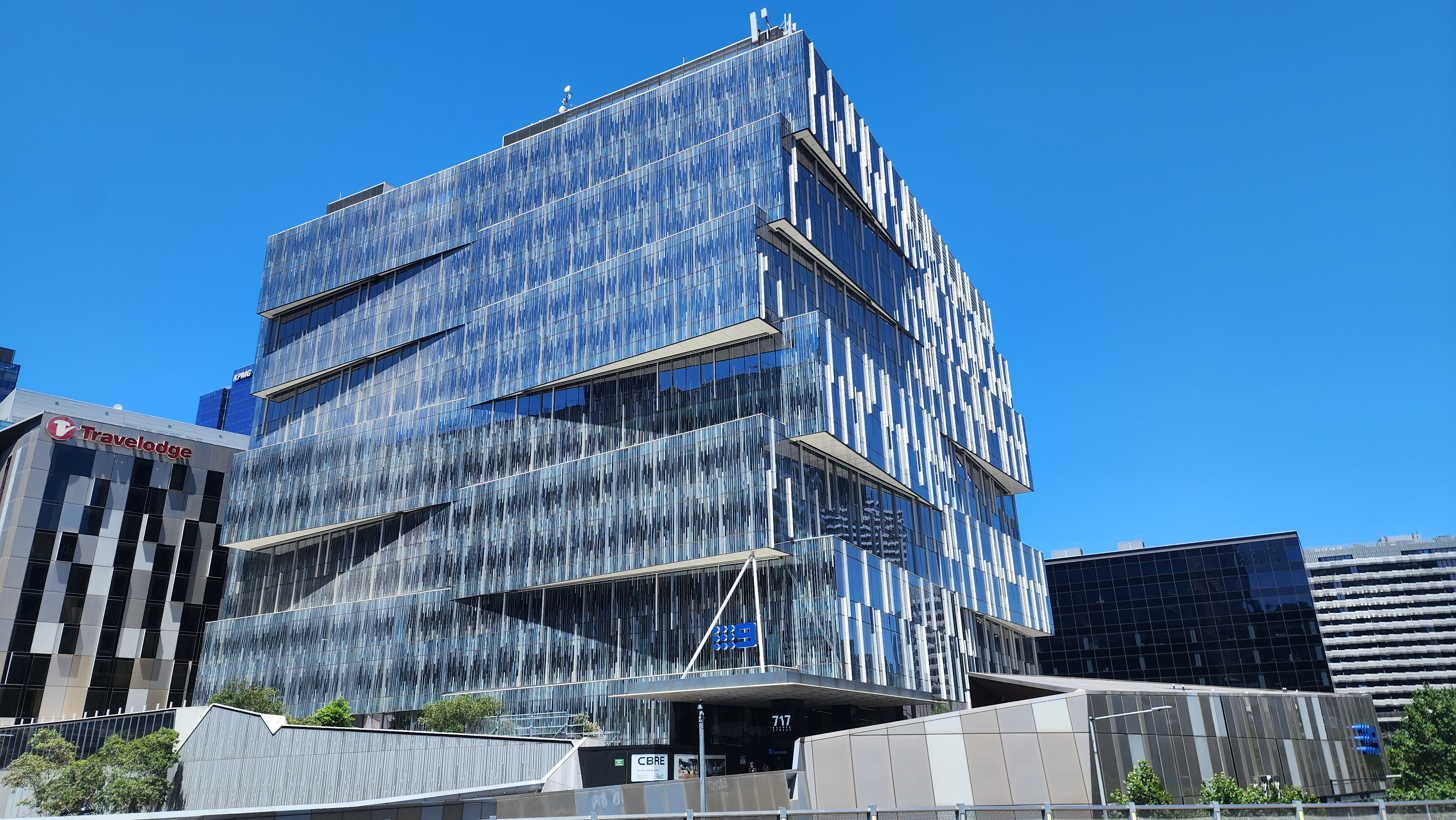
Nine Network office in Docklands

=== 2014–2019 ===
Nine relaunched 9HD, in November 2015, an HD simulcast of their primary channel, on channel 90 and launched new lifestyle channel 9Life on channel 94. In addition to the relaunch of 9HD, GEM (renamed 9Gem) was reduced to standard definition and moved to channel 92 and GO! (renamed 9Go!) was moved to channel 93. On 16 December 2015, Nine also changed its on-air theme for a continuous design across all of its channels with the Nine News/9news.com.au branding to remain unchanged. This included a new look for program listings, program advertisements and promos. Additionally in November 2015, Hugh Marks replaced David Gyngell as CEO.

On 27 January 2016, Nine's online catch-up video on-demand service 9Jumpin was retired and replaced by 9Now. 9Now offers a range of content larger than 9Jumpin and also offers a live streaming service for Nine's multicast channels. Live streaming for Nine was launched on the same day, with streaming for 9Gem, 9Go! and 9Life launched on 19 May 2016. Following the launch of 9Now, the WIN Corporation, owner of Nine affiliate WIN Television, filed a lawsuit against Nine Entertainment Co., claiming that live streaming into regional areas breaches their affiliation agreement. The case was later dismissed on 28 April 2016 with Justice Hammerschlag of the NSW Supreme Court stating that, "I have concluded that live streaming is not broadcasting within the meaning of the PSA (program supply agreement), and that Nine is under no express or implied obligation not to do it."

Following their victory in the 9Now court case, Nine Entertainment Co. announced on 29 April 2016 that it had signed a $500 million five year affiliation deal with Southern Cross Austereo, the then-primary regional affiliate of Network 10. On 1 July 2016, WIN Television lost its Nine affiliate status to Southern Cross, which had Nine's metropolitan branding introduced across its now Nine-branded television assets. Nine later secured an affiliate deal with Mildura Digital Television, a joint venture between WIN and Prime Media Group, on 28 June 2016 to supply Nine content to the Mildura and Sunraysia area due to WIN switching affiliation to Network Ten. Nine finalized supply deals with WIN for South Australia and Griffith on 29 June 2016 after long negotiations, with a deal for Tasmanian joint venture TDT secured the following day after long negotiations. A supply deal for Western Australia joint venture West Digital Television was not secured before the 1 July 2016 deadline, but a deal was later finalized on 2 July 2016 with programming resuming that night. Also after 10 years as an independent affiliate, NBN was finally folded in to the Nine Network with the NBN logo being retired on air after 54 years. However, despite being a Nine O&O station, NBN News remains as an independent news bulletin, despite adopting the full Nine News on air look.

Starting in 2017, Nine Network standard ident was phased out, as part of a move towards using only holidays-themed or special events idents rather than a single regular, continuous station identification

In June 2018, it was announced that Nine would enter into a joint venture with Australian News Channel (ANC) to create Your Money, a business news channel that replaced the Sky News Business Channel on Foxtel channel 601 and also available free-to-air through Nine on channel 95, replacing Extra. However, it closed on 17 May 2019 due to lack of advertising and poor ratings.

=== 2019–present ===
From 2017 to 2021, the network's slogan was "We Are the One". Since 2021, the network has changed its slogan back to the one used from 1977–2006 "Still the One".

After 12 years, Nine Network won the 2019 ratings year for the first time since 2006. The Seven Network had won every ratings year between 2007 and 2018 inclusive, however, due to lower than expected ratings, and a launch of new programs not performing as hoped, this allowed Nine to regain lost ground during the most competitive times of the ratings period (most notably, Nine's Married At First Sight performed above expectations, and consistently beat My Kitchen Rules which saw its lowest figures on record) which resulted in Nine's first win in the first quarter since 2009.

Nine's yearly share for 2019 concluded at 29.4%, a 2.1% increase from 2018 (27.3%) compared to Seven's 29.0%, a 1.7% decline from 2018 (30.7%)

In 2020, despite drastic and last minute changes to most network's programming schedules in light of the COVID-19 pandemic Nine Network has managed to retain the number one lead by a considerable margin.

On 5 April 2020, Nine launched 9Rush as a joint venture with Discovery Inc., which features action and adventure-themed reality series targeting a young adult male audience. On 1 October 2020, Nine Network re-launched Extra, after 2 years being discontinued, thanks to Your Money.

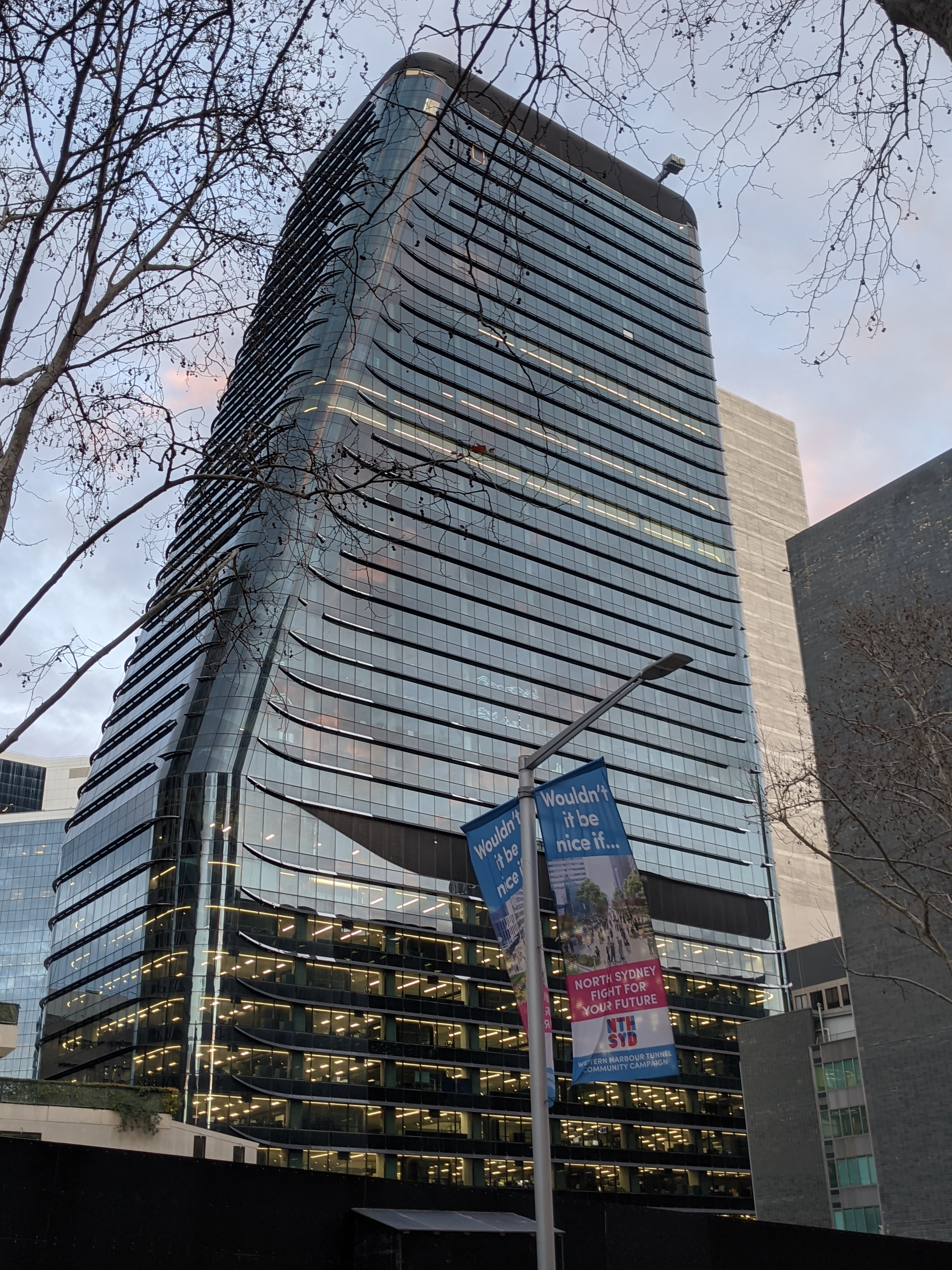
1 Denison Street, the Nine Network's current headquarters in North Sydney

On 21 November 2020, Nine moved its Sydney studios from Willoughby to North Sydney. This comes after real estate developer Mirvac bought the Willoughby studios in February 2020, and plans to transform the studios into 460 new homes.

In March 2021, it was reported that the network had suffered a suspected ransomware attack using Medusa-Locker during live broadcast. The hack disrupted its programming in Sydney and Darwin. Australia's parliament and Taylors Wines was also subject to a cyberattack around the same time, although it is unclear if the incidents are connected.

On 12 March 2021, Nine announced that it would return to WIN Television as its regional affiliate in most markets beginning on 1 July 2021, in a deal that will last at least seven years. SCA subsequently announced that it would return to Network 10, effectively reversing their 2016 realignment. Under the agreement, WIN will pay half of its regional advertising revenue to Nine Entertainment Co., and provide advertising time for Nine's properties on its radio and television outlets. WIN will also provide advertising sales services for Nine's O&O stations NBN and NTD (with the former succeeding a similar agreement it had with SCA). Nine CEO Hugh Marks explained that "while our relationship with Southern Cross has been strong over the last five years, the opportunities presented by the WIN Network to both extend the reach of Nine's premium content into more regional markets under one agreement, and to work cooperatively with them on a national and local news operation, mean this is the right time for us to return to WIN."

On 4 September 2024, the 2012 Nine Network 3D logo has been disappeared from the Today Show in favor of the original 2008 Nine Network 2D logo.

== Nine Network programming ==
=== Australian-based programs ===
Nine Network broadcasts annual events such as ARIA Music Awards and Carols by Candlelight. Nine Network's News and Current Affairs division, presents several bulletins and the weekday breakfast TV program's Today and Today Extra, as well as its weekend edition Weekend Today.

The network presents a range of entertainment programming of various genres from Australian and overseas sources.

Nine's current Australian programming line-up include: Getaway, 60 Minutes, The AFL Sunday Footy Show, Footy Classified, 100% Footy, The NRL Sunday Footy Show, Cross Court, RBT, Emergency, Paramedics, The Block, Tipping Point Australia, 20 to 1, Australian Ninja Warrior, Travel Guides, Lego Masters, Married at First Sight, The Hundred with Andy Lee, Parental Guidance, Snackmasters, The Summit, Love Island Australia, My Mum, Your Dad, Taronga: Who's Who in the Zoo, Jeopardy! Australia, and Accidental Heroes.

=== International programs ===
Current American programs that air on Nine and its digital multi channels are sourced from Nine's deals with Roadshow Entertainment / Warner Bros. International Television Distribution and Warner Bros. Entertainment Inc, Sony Pictures Television International / Sony Pictures Animation, CBS Studios, Walt Disney Studios Motion Pictures, Disney Platform Distribution / Pixar Animation Studios / Lucasfilm / 20th Television and 20th Century Studios / Regency Enterprises, NBC Universal Television, United International Pictures and Metro-Goldwyn-Mayer Television International.

The network's flagship overseas program was the popular sitcoms The Big Bang Theory and Young Sheldon. Other American programs on Nine include medical drama Chicago Med, documentary series The First 48 and crime dramas Law & Order True Crime and Law & Order: Organized Crime. British programs on Nine include the UK game shows Pointless and Tipping Point. Sony Pictures daytime soap operas on 9Gem include Days of Our Lives and The Young and The Restless. Extra aired on Nine up until its 26th season; it also aired the television adaptation of Lethal Weapon for much of its run. From 2008 until 2021 and 2013 respectively, Nine also broadcast the American daytime talk shows The Ellen DeGeneres Show and The View.

In 2015, the network cut ties with Warner Bros. Television, which caused the local broadcast TV rights to such series as Arrow, Gotham, Mom and 2 Broke Girls to be shopped around to other networks.

On 11 March 2015, Nine created a new acquired programming deal with Nickelodeon, granting the network programming rights until 2023.

On 2 April 2017, Nine created a new acquired programming deal with NBCUniversal, granting the network programming rights.

On 22 February 2020, DreamWorks Animation films became exclusive to Nine Network after 8 years in which Network 10 and Seven Network owned the telecast rights to them. This was owed to NBCUniversal having recently reunited with DreamWorks after a separation of 15 years and because of Network 10 having recently become a subsidiary of Paramount Australia & New Zealand and therefore having access to programming from Comedy Central, MTV and Nickelodeon.

==== Shared overseas programs ====
Shared American programming that airs on Nine and Seven and their digital multi channels are sourced from Nine and Seven's deals with DreamWorks Animation, NBCUniversal Global Distribution, Warner Bros. Television Distribution / Warner Bros. Entertainment Inc, Sony Pictures Television International / Sony Pictures Animation and 20th Television / 20th Century Studios.

Shared American programming that airs on Nine and 10 and their digital multi channels are sourced from Nine and 10's deals with CBS Studios, United International Pictures, DreamWorks / DreamWorks Animation and Warner Bros. Television Distribution.

Shared American programming that airs on Nine and ABC and their digital multi channels are sourced from Nine and ABC's deals with NBCUniversal Global Distribution / DreamWorks Animation, Warner Bros. Television Distribution, 20th Television, 20th Century Studios / Regency Enterprises and Sony Pictures Television International.

=== Former programs ===
The network formerly broadcast film and television titles from Nickelodeon from 2015 to 2022, Miramax from 2016 to 2024, Paramount from 2016 to 2024, DreamWorks from 2017 to 2025, DreamWorks Animation from 2017 to 2025, Illumination from 2017 to 2025 and NBCUniversal from 2017 to 2025.

== News and popular affairs ==
=== History ===
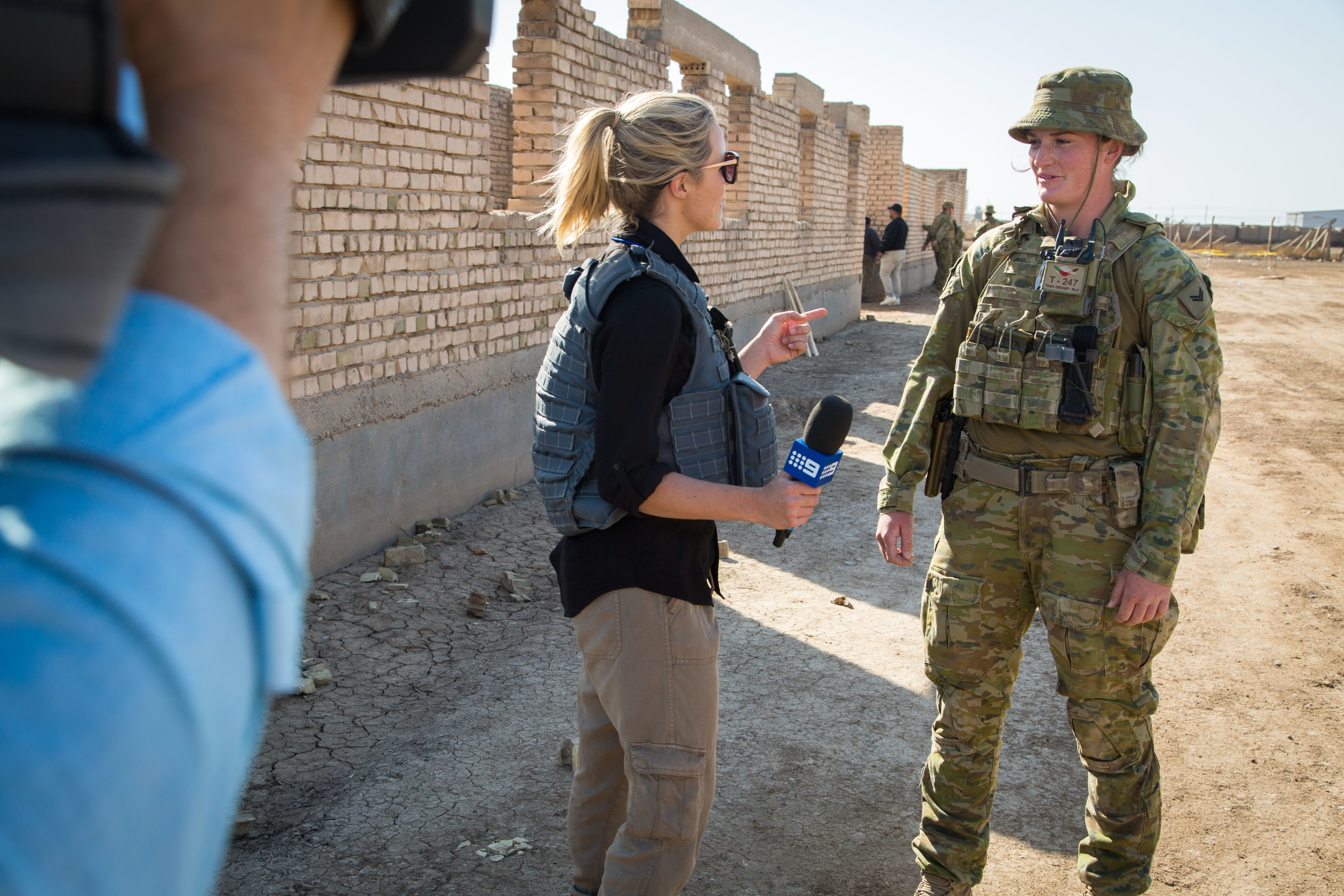
A Nine Network journalist interviewing an Australian soldier in Iraq during 2017

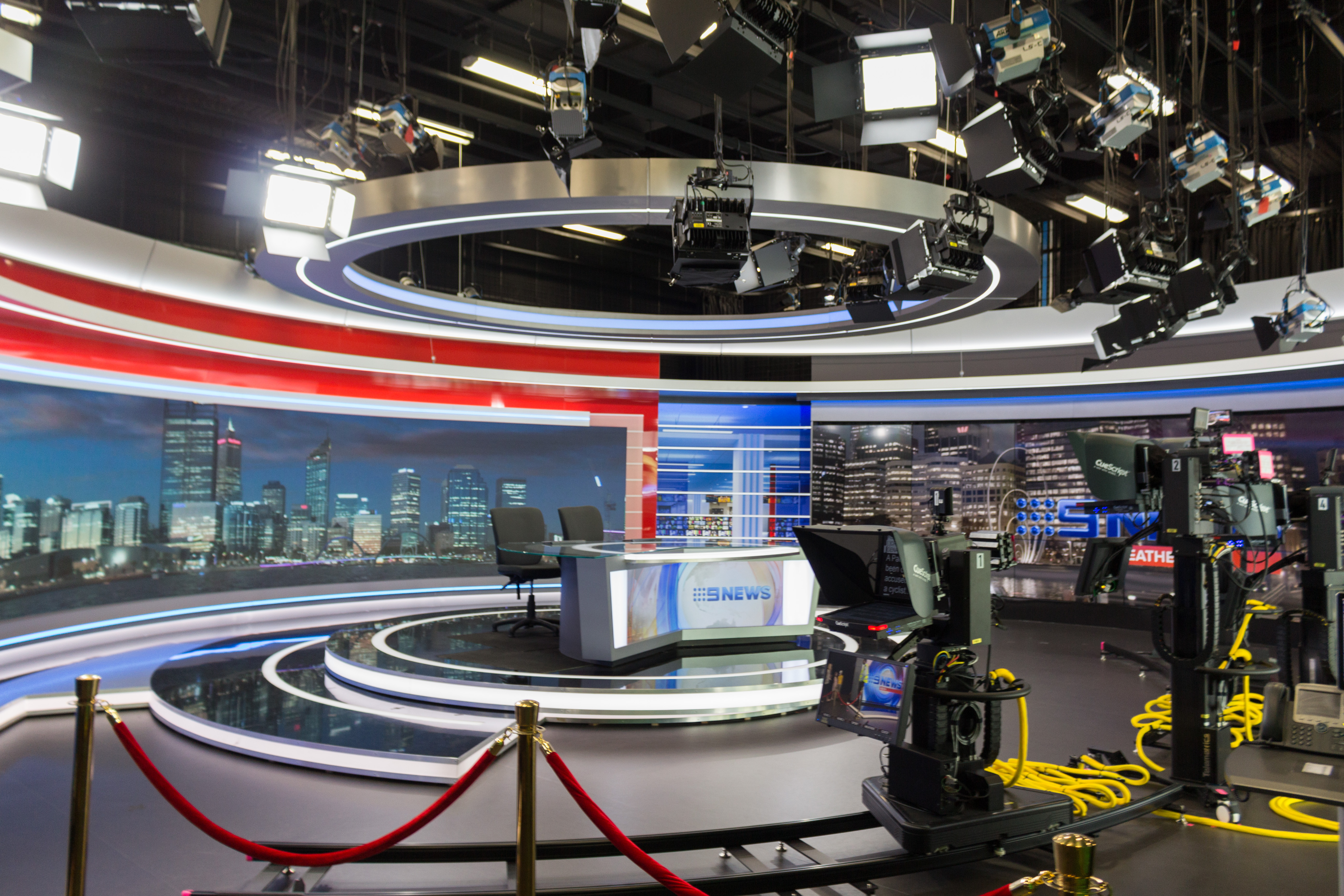
The set of Nine News Perth

Nine Network's news service is Nine News (previously National Nine News). For many decades, it was the top-rating news service nationally, but was over taken in the mid-2000s by rival network Seven. Nine regained its news dominance (nationally) at the conclusion of the 2013 ratings year.

Nine produces several news bulletins and programs, including Today, Today Extra, Weekend Today, Today Early News, 9News Morning, 9News Afternoon, 9News: First at Five, local nightly editions of 9News as well as regional news bulletins for Northern New South Wales and the Gold Coast under the name NBN News and since March 2020, national late night bulletins titled Nine News Late

The news service also produces A Current Affair which programs every weekday and Saturday, Under Investigation, an investigative current affairs show which programs every Monday, and 60 Minutes, which programs every Sunday night. Until mid-2018 during weekday overnights and Sunday mornings, Nine rebroadcast American television network ABC's news and current affairs program Good Morning America.

From 2008, major expansion saw Today broadcast on Saturday and Sunday, the weekday version running from 05:30 until 09:00 weekdays, the launch of Nine Early News, the axing of the Sunday program, National Nine News becoming Nine News after poor ratings, losing to Seven News, Nine Late News was launched then renamed as Nightline and the 11 am bulletin being renamed as Nine's Morning News, running from 11:00 until 12:00 weekdays (now a half-hour news bulletin from 2015 onwards).

Meanwhile, several additions have been made to Nine News teams around the country, as well as the acquisition of more reporters by A Current Affair and also state-based Today reporters (plus a Weekend Today weather presenter).

In 2014, Nine News website moved from its ninemsn website (now known as nine.com.au) to a brand-only website become 9news.com.au, which are still in use to this day.

Nine has posted journalists overseas to cover major European stories following the closure of its European bureau in late 2008, with the last European correspondent, James Talia, being redesignated to his former role as a senior Melbourne Nine News journalist. Reporters including Simon Bouda, Allison Langdon, Chloe Bugelly, Eddie Blake, Tim Arvier, and Brett McLeod have all been on projects for Nine News bulletins in Greece, the UK, France, South Africa, Thailand, and the Czech Republic.

Starting in the 1980s, the Eyewitness News theme music (adapted from the film Cool Hand Luke) has been the official Nine News theme. First adopted in the Sydney and Melbourne stations and later in Perth and Adelaide, it is now played nationwide in all 7 O&O stations in their respective newscasts. Until 2021, NBN News used its own theme music, from 8 November 2021, it started using the Nine News theme music. The theme is also used by Nine's radio division Nine Radio.

== Sport ==
Nine Network broadcasts all sporting events under the Wide World of Sports brand. The flagship sports of the brand are cricket until Nine lost the rights in 2018, Australian Open Tennis, National Rugby League (NRL), and formerly Australian Football League (AFL), until Nine lost the rights in 2006, and Super League while it existed. NRL games are broadcast in prime time on Nine in New South Wales, Australian Capital Territory, Northern Territory and Queensland on Friday nights; however, prime time NRL is shown at same time on multi-channel 9Gem in Victoria, South Australia, Western Australia, and Tasmania.

Nine's other popular recurring sporting events include the State of Origin series, Gillette Twenty20 until Nine lost the rights in 2018, Gillette Series Cricket until Nine lost the rights in 2018, and Test cricket until Nine lost the rights in 2018, and formerly the Australian Swimming Championships until Nine lost the rights in 2009. As well as this, Nine Network also had broadcast rights for the 2006 Commonwealth Games, and, in joint partnership with subscription television provider Foxtel, had broadcast rights for the 2010 Winter Olympics and the 2012 Summer Olympics.

On 26 May 2010, Nine became the first free-to-air television channel in Australia to broadcast in 3D. The broadcast was the 2010 State of Origin series.

In 2017 Nine's Wide World of Sports became the home of netball in Australia. The network broadcasts two live matches every Saturday Night of the new Super Netball league. They also televise every Australia national netball team match including Constellation Cup and Netball Quad Series matches. All netball is live on 9Gem.

In 2018, Nine acquired the rights to the Australian Open from 2020 through until 2024. In 2022, Nine extended its rights to the Australian Open until 2029.

In February 2023, Nine regained the rights to the Olympics from the 2024 Summer Olympics through to the 2032 Summer Olympics in Brisbane.

On 20 February 2024, it was announced Nine had obtained the rights to broadcast the Melbourne Cup and Melbourne Cup carnival from 2024 through to 2029.

== Availability ==
Nine Network is simulcast in standard and high-definition digital. Nine's core programming is fibre-fed out of GTV Melbourne to its sister stations and affiliates, with TCN Sydney providing national news and current affairs programming. The current affairs programming was originally done at GTV before moving to TCN in 2012. The receiving stations and affiliates then insert their own localised news and advertising which is then broadcast in metropolitan areas via owned-and-operated stations, including TCN Sydney, GTV Melbourne, QTQ Brisbane, NWS Adelaide and STW Perth. Nine Network programming is also carried into the rest of regional Australia by affiliated stations owned by WIN Television, Seven Media Group (GDS/BDN Spencer Gulf & Broken Hill) and Imparja Television. Nine is also broadcast via satellite and cable on Foxtel.

In 2013, Nine Network switched their captioning provider from Red Bee Media to Ai-Media.

=== 9HD ===
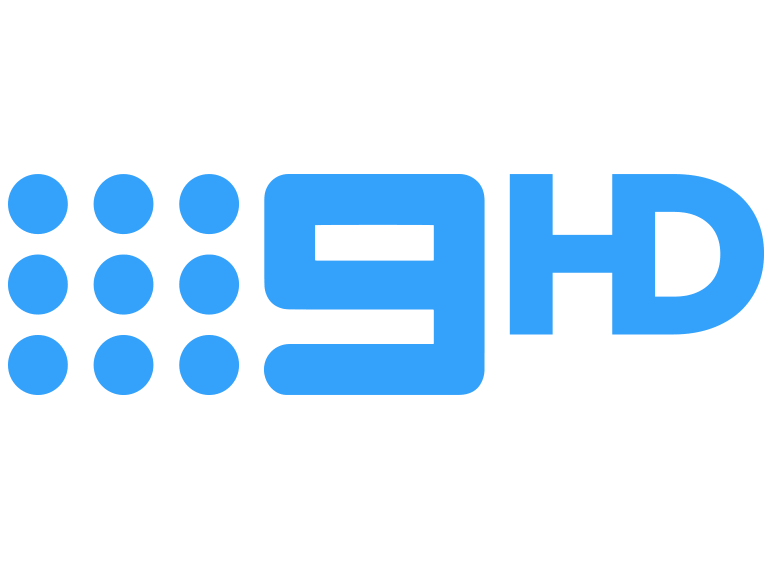
9HD's logo, as of 2020.

Nine Network originally launched a high-definition simulcast of their main channel on channel 90 on 1 January 2001 alongside the introduction of digital terrestrial television in Australia. The simulcast was relaunched as a breakaway multichannel 9HD on 17 March 2008 but was reverted to a simulcast on 3 August 2009 and was later replaced by GEM (now 9Gem) on 26 September 2010. 9HD was revived as a 1080i HD simulcast of Nine on 26 November 2015 on channel 90, bumping 9Gem to SD on channel 92.

=== 9Now ===
9Now is a video-on-demand, catch-up TV service run by Nine Network. The service became available on 27 January 2016, replacing Nine's previous service 9Jumpin. 9Now also offers online live streaming for Channel 9, 9Gem, 9Go!, 9Life and 9Rush.

== Logo and corporate identity ==
The Nine Network logo, which consists of a numeral "9" beside nine dots arranged in a 3x3 grid, is one of the most recognisable logos in Australia.

In 1997, the dots were changed to spheres. The spheres returned to dots as a new on-air identity package was created by Velvet mediendesign in 2001.

This logo was redesigned by Velvet Mediendesign on 1 January 2001, with the introduction of digital TV in Australia and new graphics.

On 1 September 2002, the dots were changed back to spheres from the 1997 logo as well as the numeral becoming 3D for their "7 colours for 7 days" presentation package.

On 30 January 2006, the network and its affiliates relaunched their logos to coincide with Nine's 50th anniversary.

A numeral nine was reworked with a few rounded corners eliminated in process. This logo would use a blue square featuring the numeral altered, which saw the removal of the nine dots again. The graphics package used during that time was designed by Bruce Dunlop Associates.

Later on 15 January 2007, the blue square became solid, and in May they partially relaunched the nine dots, which are visible on every second surface of the box. This logo continued to be used in Perth and Adelaide stations until March 2010, when they reinstated the nine-dots logo.

On 14 January 2008, Nine completely reinstated the nine dots logo, but with a different design. The slogan used with this logo was "we♥TV", which had also been used in December 2007 with the previous logo. This time, the dots are now a bit bigger, like the 1969 logo and the numeral 9 from the previous 2006 logo would continue.

This logo would first be used in Sydney, Melbourne, Brisbane and Darwin markets but the logo would not be used in both Perth and Adelaide markets, until March 2010, due to being owned by WIN Corporation at the same time.

As a part of a major relaunch, the entire logo became 3D on the same day as part of a short-lived rebrand. The nine dots are represented by translucent 3D discs during that year. The music used throughout the network's ID's and promotions was "Smile"' by The Supernaturals, released in 1997. This logo would only be used in 4 metropolitan markets.

On 1 February 2009, the dots are once again 2D as part of a short-lived rebrand, which lasted until 26 September.

On 27 September, the dots are changed to spheres from the 1997 logo yet again when the network's original slogan "Welcome Home" was launched. It also began to re-use the iconic "Still The One" theme tune from 1992 in one of the ID's. The dots is smaller, like the previous 2001 logo and in March 2010, the dots were reinstated in both Perth and Adelaide markets.

Since 4 September 2024, the long-running Nine Network 3D logo has been officially removed and revival of the 2008 Nine Network logo only on-air presentation except other Nine Network channels which used currently for 3D logo instead of the main channel.

9 July 1969 – 31 December 2000

1977–1988 (On-air presentation only)

1 January 2001 – 29 January 2006

30 January 2006 – 13 January 2008

14 January 2008 – present

27 September 2009 – 15 April 2012 (On-air presentation only)

15 April 2012 – 4 September 2024 (On-air presentation only)

== Slogans ==
- Summer 1971/1972: Have a Happy Summer (GTV-9 only)
- 1972: Get the Channel 9 Feeling!
- 1973: This is the Place to Be in '73
- Winter 1974: Come Home to Us This Winter (GTV-9 only)
- 1975–1976: Living Color
- 1977: Let Us Be The One (from American Broadcasting Company in 1976)
- 1978, 1980 – December 2006, 7 November 2021 – present: Still The One (also used by the American Broadcasting Company in 1977 and 1979, WIN Television from 1989 to December 2006, NBN Television from 1994 to December 2006 and GMV6, BTV6, VTV and TasTV in the 1990s)
- 1979 – 14 May 2006: This is Channel 9
- 1979: We're The One (from American Broadcasting Company in 1978)
- 1980: The National Nine Network, First in Australia
- 16 September 1981: 25 Years of Television.
- 1982: Number One For Me. (GTV-9 / TCN-9 only)
- 1983: Come On Along (from American Broadcasting Company in 1982 and from the dialogue from NBC's song)
- 1985: Now is the Time, Channel Nine is the Place (also used by American Broadcasting Company in 1982) (STW-9 only)
- 1985: Nine's For You (QTQ-9 only)
- 1986: You'll Love It (from American Broadcasting Company in 1985) (GTV-9 / TCN-9 / QTQ-9 / NWS-9 only)
- 1995: I am... We are Channel Nine People (from CBS I am CBS Everyday People in 1994)
- 1996: Celebrating 40 Years of Television, This is Channel Nine
- 1999–2000: New Millennium Television
- 28 November 2004 – 29 January 2006: Feel Good Summer
- 14 May 2006 – 30 November 2007: Channel Nine (also used at the end of promotions from 15 January 2007 to 13 January 2008)
- 1 December 2007 – 31 January 2009: we♥TV
- 1 February – 27 September 2009: Choose Nine
- 27 September 2009 – 23 December 2017: Welcome Home (from CBS from 1996 to 1999)
- 2014–present: Love This City (QTQ-9 only)
- 16 September 2016: Celebrating 60 Years of Television, Happy Birthday, Channel Nine
- Christmas 2016, 2017 and 2018: Merry Christmas
- New Year's Day 2017 and 2018: Happy 2017, Happy 2018
- October 2016 – present: We Lo♥e It (NBN only)
- 24 December 2017 – 7 November 2021: We Are The One

== Incidents ==
In March 2021, Thomas Sewell, leader of a neo-Nazi group, and an associate who filmed the incident, went to the Channel 9 Melbourne studios and asked to speak to news staff, before attacking a security guard who was trying to escort him out. Sewell was charged with affray, recklessly causing injury and assault.

== See also ==
- List of Australian television series
- 9HD
- 9Gem
- 9Go!
- 9Life
- 9Rush
- Extra
- 9Go!HD
