= NBN (TV station) =

WIN Television Network station in Newcastle, Australia

- Logo used since 2008, still used for news only. Last logo used on air from 2008 to 2016.
- Northern New South Wales & Gold Coast; Australia
- Channels: Virtual: 8 SD, 80 HD
- Branding: Nine

Programming
- Language: English
- Affiliations: Nine

Ownership
- Owner: WIN Corporation; (NBN Pty Ltd)

History
- First air date: 4 March 1962
- Former affiliations: Independent (1962–1991)
- Call sign meaning: Newcastle Broadcasting New South Wales

Technical information
- Licensing authority: Australian Communications & Media Authority

Links
- Website: www.ninenbn.com.au

NBN is an Australian television station based in Newcastle, Australia. The station was inaugurated on 4 March 1962 as the first regional commercial television station in New South Wales, and has since expanded to 39 transmitters throughout Northern New South Wales including Lismore, Tweed Heads, Tamworth, Coffs Harbour, Port Macquarie, Newcastle and the Central Coast as well as the Gold Coast, Queensland. It is owned and operated by the WIN Corporation, with regional sales and newsroom located at 28 Honeysuckle Drive.

The station's call sign, NBN, is an acronym for Newcastle Broadcasting New South Wales. Between 2007 and 2026, the station was owned by Nine's parent company Nine Entertainment (previously known as PBL Media) making it a sister station to its metropolitan counterparts. However, following the PBL acquisition, NBN at the time continued to operate as an independent regional affiliate of the main network under the name NBN Television. On 1 July 2016, when Nine switched regional affiliations outside Northern NSW and the Gold Coast, NBN was finally folded into the Nine Network adopting the primary logo with the NBN name retired on air.

In January 2026, Nine Entertainment announced its intention to sell NBN to the WIN Corporation. The sale was completed on 2 June 2026.

Following WIN’s acquisition of the station, as of Saturday 27 June 2026, local weekend editions of NBN News was replaced by Nine News Sydney at 6:00pm on both Saturday and Sunday nights. Weekday local bulletins were moved to an earlier time slot as of Monday 29 June 2026, with the half-hour local news service airing at 5:30pm, followed by Nine News at 6:00pm.

== History ==
=== Origins ===
TV Week reporting NBN as the first regional station in New South Wales in 1962

NBN's original owner, the Newcastle Broadcasting and Television Corporation (NBTC) was founded in May 1958 to begin preparations for the upcoming television licence allocations. The main shareholders in NBTC were United Broadcasting Company (owned by the Lamb family, owners of radio station 2KO), Airsales Broadcasting Company (owners of local radio station 2HD), and the Newcastle Morning Herald & Miners Advocate (to be bought out by John Fairfax & Sons). In accordance with the Australian Broadcasting Control Board regulations, at least 50% of the company had to be locally owned. Approximately 2,000 people bought shares.

The Australian Broadcasting Control Board awarded the commercial television licence for the Newcastle and Hunter Valley area to the NBTC on 1 August 1961. NBN-3 would transmit on VHF channel 3, from a transmitter atop Mount Sugarloaf near Newcastle. Council approval for the transmitter was issued on 17 July that year.

The call-letters, NBN, were derived from the company's name, Newcastle Broadcasting and Television Corporation, with the second N representing New South Wales, as required by law. Unofficially, it stood for "Newcastle Broadcasting Network".

Construction began in November 1961, supervised by engineers from RCA in the United States. It was a step backwards for RCA, building a new station transmitting in black and white while colour television was fast becoming the norm in the United States. Ninety per cent of the original equipment was imported from the United States, and held in bond until they were due to be installed. Equipment was purchased with colour production and transmission in mind, so that only 20% modification would be required when colour came to NBN. Studios were to be built on a 3-acre (1.2 ha) block at Mosbri Crescent, near the city centre.

Work on the 142 m (466 ft) transmitter was delayed by a combination of weather, the conditions for the road leading to Mount Sugarloaf, and excited sightseers blocking work trucks during the weekends. During that time, the technical team stayed at the top of the mountain. The construction took eight months at a cost of $1.5 million, and required staff to work seven days a week (except on Christmas Day) to make the deadline.

Test transmissions took place in early 1962, and could be seen as far away as Muswellbrook, Avalon, Katoomba, Lithgow, Gloucester and around Port Kembla.

==== Opening night ====
Murray Finlay began his career as one of Australia's longest-serving newsreaders with NBN's first bulletin.

NBN Television commenced transmission on 4 March 1962. The first programme on launch night began at 6 pm, a taped welcome by the then-Postmaster General Charles Davidson. Following that was a guided tour around the NBN studios by the original production manager, Matthew Tapp.

Murray Finlay began one of the longest newsreading careers in Australia with NBN's first news bulletin at 6:30 pm. This was followed by The Phil Silvers Show at 7 pm, and the 1937 movie Green Light starring Errol Flynn at 7:30; the George Sanders Mystery Theater series followed at 9 pm, with opening episode, The Man in the Elevator, followed by the first episode from the Halls of Ivy, then the first Mystery Theatre program, The Missing Head at 10 pm. Anglican Bishop James Housden gave the first evening meditation at 10:30 pm, marking the end of the first night of transmission for NBN-3 in Newcastle. Commercials on the first night included Rothmans, Streets Ice Cream, Ampol, Commonwealth Bank, Shell, and WD & HO Wills, amongst others.

In the lead-up to the opening night, the station promised at least two movies a week, as well as men's interest programs each Saturday afternoon between 3 pm and 4 pm – a commitment successfully met, along with female-targeted programming in the early afternoon, and children's programming from 4:30 to 6:30 pm weekdays and mature programming thirty minutes before closedown each night. NBN Television broadcast fifty-six hours in its first week of transmission, setting the Australian television record for the most time spent on air in a week for a new television station.

=== 1960s to the 1970s ===
Soon after launch night, NBN extended television coverage from Bungwahl to Broken Bay and as far west as Aberdeen. The station only operated eight hours per day, however several programs were produced locally including Home at Three, Let's Cook With Gas, Tempo, Focus, as well as nightly news bulletins at 6:30 pm.

In 1963, Australian Consolidated Press and News Limited bought 200,000 shares in the Newcastle Broadcasting and Television Corporation. Shortly after, United Broadcasting Company sold its shares to Neatherley Investments Limited in Adelaide, and Australian United Investments in Melbourne, with each company purchasing 100,000 shares. Time Enterprises, purchased Australian United Investments’ shares in November 1967.

During the period between 1968 and 1969, NBN secured a relay from the Postmaster-General to enhance their news service. In 1970, NBN began upgrading its studios in preparation for the commencement of colour television originally scheduled for 1972, later changed to March 1975, at a cost of $360,000. The improvements included an enlarged film department; a film editing and cleaning equipment; a larger master control with four video transfer machines; a new telecine room with caption scanner and slide drums; as well as an expansion of the administration and staff offices, which also included new offices and a boardroom.

In 1972, NBN was granted a licence to operate a translator in the Upper Hunter Valley from Rossgole Lookout near Aberdeen, on VHF channel 10. Concurrently in April 1972, NBN expanded its nightly news service to one hour, becoming the first television station in Australia to have a one-hour news bulletin. As a part of earlier preparations for colour production, between 1972 and 1973, orders were placed with Rank Cintel and the EMI Group in the United Kingdom and Ampex in the United States for new colour equipment, in time for colour transmission tests on 7 October 1974. On 1 March 1975, the station began regular colour transmissions, whilst transmission was expanded to Banderra Downs, Merriwa, Mount Helen, and Murrurundi at a cost of $180,000. In 1978, the Newcastle Broadcasting and Television Corporation made a bid for local station (and former owner) 2HD, however was disallowed by the Australian Broadcasting Tribunal. Also during the same year more extensions were added to the studios (which included a new car park), which were officially opened on 17 November 1978.

On 22 November 1979, the Newcastle Broadcasting and Television Corporation officially became NBN Limited, after the station itself rebranded from Channel 3 to NBN Television around 1977. By the late 1970s, NBN was producing 20 hours a week of local and networked programming from its studios, which in turn led the station to purchase a Bell Jet Ranger helicopter for news coverage purposes.

=== 1980s to the 1990s ===
In early 1980, NBN purchased Southern Television Corporation Limited, owners of NWS-9 in Adelaide, for $19 million. During the same year, NBN began a teletext service and also purchased the free local newspaper, the Newcastle Star. In June 1981 Parry Corporation purchased 19.88% shareholding.

NBN Limited (1981)
Entity	Share
Lamb family	35.02%
Wansey family	30.14%
Parry Corporation	19.88%
Others	14.96%

Parry had then attempted to buy Michael Wansey's stake in NBN, but was blocked by the Supreme Court of New South Wales. It was later revealed that the Lambs had opposed NBN's purchase of the Star newspaper (created and owned by Wansey) and the attempt to buy 2HD. The company also faced possible suspension from the Australian Securities Exchange if a decision was not made soon. To resolve the tension, NBN sold NWS-9 to the Lambs in exchange for the majority stake in NBN in 1982. With the buy-out of community shares in NBN, the station ceased to be what Hunter residents considered to be "their own". It came at a cost. Wansey mortgaged his shares to Parry who called in the debt.

On 16 March 1983, Parry Corporation completed the purchase of NBN, delisting the company. Michael Wansey resigned from the board at the end of the year as a result. In 1984, plans for a second independent station in Newcastle had failed. During that time, NBN and ABC Newcastle (call sign ABHN-5A) were asked to leave the VHF band to accommodate FM radio. At the time, NBN's audio carrier frequency could be listened to with a standard FM radio.

It was planned for NBN to transmit on UHF channel 51, and the ABC on UHF channel 48, however this did not eventuate. A proposal to launch a radiated subscription television service with community broadcasting during the daytime hours had also failed that year.

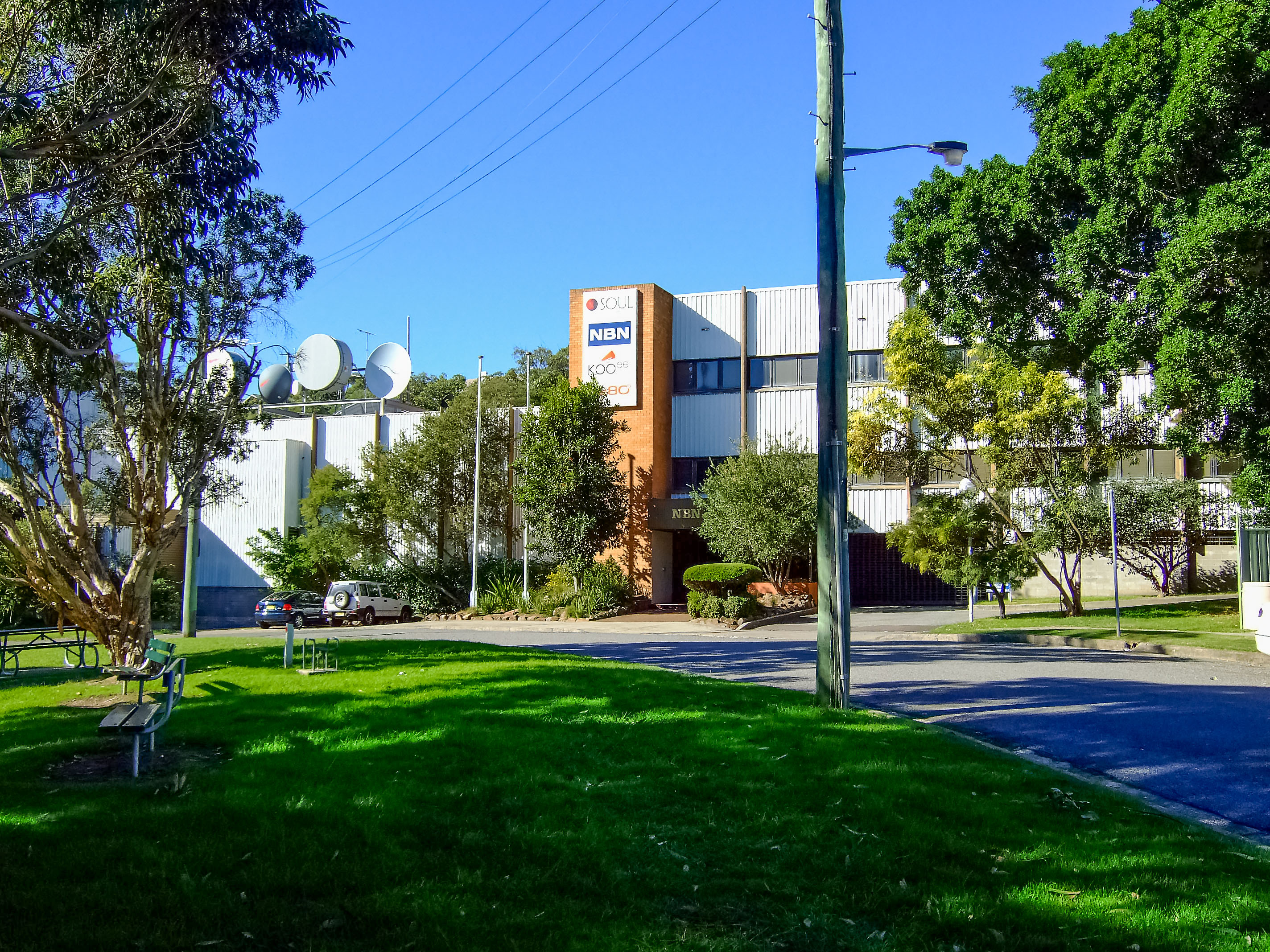
NBN's former headquarters on Mosbri Crescent in Newcastle. As of 26 May 2007, administration and the studio are to the right and left respectively.

In the late 1980s, NBN's Perth-based owner, Parry Corporation, spun off NBN Limited into a new company, NBN Enterprises, and took a 40 per cent stake in the new company, with Security Pacific Capital Corporation buying 60 per cent, sold their stake soon after, holding onto Papua New Guinea television station NTN, which NBN had helped to set up. Fulcrum Media's move to later purchase the station was a source for confusion, as it was revealed that many companies, including the NSW State Superannuation Board and Westpac, held substantial stakes in Fulcrum Media. Parry Corporation's new owner CityWest issued a court challenge to re-acquire NBN, but it was revealed that CityWest was held by Hong Kong company Hang Lung Properties, thereby violating foreign ownership laws. Following ownership changes, NBN Enterprises was sold to Washington H Soul Pattinson in October 1989.

NBN was one of many stations opposed to aggregation, and offered an alternative by opening up a second station which it would operate for a period of time before selling it. This proposal was however rejected, and aggregation occurred on 31 December 1991, with NBN acquiring Nine Network affiliation. Following aggregation, the station's coverage expanded to cover all of northern New South Wales, whilst concurrently programming extended to twenty-four hours in a day, in stereophonic sound. NBN Television's 1977 logo however was retained until late 1994 when it was updated to feature the Nine Networks 'nine dots' in a new logo similar to fellow affiliate WIN Television.

=== 2000s ===
Throughout the 2000s, NBN was regarded as one of the leaders in digital broadcasting, not only being the first to produce a nightly regional news bulletin in full digital format, using a digital friendly news set, but also Australia's first fully digital outside broadcast van.

In 2004, Washington H Soul Pattinson began moves to transfer control of the station to its publicly listed subsidiary, Soul Pattinson Telecommunications, which became SP Telemedia as a result.

On 30 January 2006, NBN adopted a new logo and on air graphics, in line with Nine's new logo. However, the news department did not update its graphics until 15 March. During April 2007, SP Telemedia announced that it would consider selling NBN Television, and had received at least two bids, one each from WIN Corporation and PBL Media. On 9 May 2007, PBL Media's $250 million bid became final, winning the sale. However, upon acquiring NBN, PBL did not fold it into the main Nine Network, but continued to operate it as a regional independent station until 2016. The purchase also secured permanent status of supplying Nine's content to the station's entire coverage area, sparing any future affiliation switches (particularly the 2016 Australian television shakeup involving Southern Cross Austereo and WIN Corporation). The affiliation switch was reversed in July 2021.

Following Nine's relaunch of their high definition simulcast as "Nine HD" on 17 March 2008, NBN launched their own HD simulcast in mid-2008 called "NBN HD".

On 9 August 2009, NBN began transmission of the new digital channel GO! (now 9Go!) on channel 88.

=== 2010s ===
In 2010, it was announced that two of NBN's inner Newcastle retransmitter sites in Charlestown and Cooks Hill were selected to carry 3D broadcasts of the 2010 State of Origin series. On 26 September 2010, NBN began transmission of the HD digital channel GEM (now 9Gem) on channel 80.

In January 2012, NBN celebrated 50 years of broadcasting across Northern NSW and the Gold Coast. Coincidentally, it also marked 20 years since the station took Nine's signal across all of Northern NSW. On 26 March 2012, NBN began transmission of Nine's metropolitan informercial channel Extra on channel 84.

On 27 January 2014, along with the Nine Network, NBN switched from the Supertext logo to Nine's Closed Captioning logo.

After Nine revived 9HD and launched new lifestyle channel 9Life on 26 November 2015, NBN made no announcements of its intent to follow Nine's move in regional areas, instead continuing to broadcast 9Gem's HD feed on channel 80. NBN released a statement on its website days before the 9HD relaunch, saying that efforts are made to upgrade its stations across the region. On 10 February 2016, Nine Entertainment announced that NBN would receive both 9HD and 9Life in "coming months", with further confirmation on 16 February that they would launch on 1 March 2016. As a result, their channel listing was reshuffled to match to Nine's metropolitan listing with 9Gem on channel 82, 9Go! on channel 83, 9Life on channel 84 and Extra on channel 85.

On 9 February 2016, it was announced that Kylie Blucher, managing director of QTQ Brisbane, would be appointed managing director of NBN while retaining her position at QTQ, stating that she would "be splitting [her] time between Brisbane and Newcastle".

Alongside the launch of 9HD and 9Life on 1 March 2016, NBN's unique branding began to be phased out in favour of Nine's mainstream branding already in place on its metropolitan stations and its Darwin station. The mainstream logos for Nine and 9HD were used with "NBN" written alongside in a smaller font. On 1 July 2016, coinciding with the media shakeup of WIN and Southern Cross, NBN's unique branding was completely phased out. As a result, NBN was folded into the Nine Network. But for the time being NBN News remains under its unique name and the small "NBN" on the Nine watermark is still used in areas where NBN's signal overlaps with TCN Sydney and QTQ Brisbane to differentiate between the stations. However, NBN continued to cover the Nine News logo on all network national news bulletins until July 2018. Until 2020, the NBN News coverup was used on the 4 pm news in Sydney, however that is no longer the case. The coverup is still used on the 4 pm news in Queensland on the Gold Coast feed until 2024.

In October 2016, Nine Entertainment lodged a development application with Newcastle City Council about plans to turn the current NBN studios into medium density housing. As a result of this, the network is planning on moving NBN somewhere in the Newcastle CBD. During this time, it was unclear whether NBN News would be retained under its current name following the move to the new workspace. Studio presentation was also uncertain once the transfer occurs.

In March 2018, Nine's regional affiliate Southern Cross Austereo began advertising sales for NBN. As a result, the advertising department moved from NBN's offices to SCA's radio offices.

In June 2018, Nine Entertainment moved NBN's playout facilities to the networks main playout centre in Frenchs Forest, Sydney as part of Nine's plans to integrate NBN into the network.

=== 2020s ===
In November 2021, after almost 60 years broadcasting from the Mosbri Crescent studios, NBN moved to new state of the art facilities located at 28 Honeysuckle Drive, Newcastle. This will allow NBN to update its ageing technology and grow the business. It was also announced that upon completion of the move, the name NBN News will be retained for the 6 pm bulletin, thus for now resting any speculation that the bulletin will be rebadged as Nine News as well as speculation that studio presentation of the news would be relocated to the network's new North Sydney Studios. The move was originally meant to be completed in June 2021, but following the hacking situation that occurred at Nine's North Sydney studios in March, and statewide COVID-19 lockdowns across New South Wales, the planned move was pushed back to November.

On 30 November 2020, Jenny Webber, head of commercial production for both Nine Queensland (QTQ) and Nine Northern NSW would be appointed into the new role of General Manager for NBN overseeing the stations commercial department Nine Digital Production, the stations day-to-day operations, as well as oversee local digital advertising agent Nine Digital Direct. Kylie Blucher would retain her role as managing director of both QTQ and NBN.

On 7 November 2021, the station transmitted its local programming from the Mosbri Crescent studios for the final time, preceded by 30-minute tribute special Goodbye Mosbri, a look back of 59 years of news bulletins, telethons and top rating local programs as well as the history of NBN Television. The station completed its move to Honeysuckle the following day.

In March 2022, NBN celebrated 60 years of broadcasting across Northern NSW and the Gold Coast. Coincidentally, it also marked 30 years since the station took Nine's signal across all of Northern NSW.

Nine Entertainment in January 2026, announced its intention to sell NBN to the WIN Corporation, thus forming part of the WIN Network. The sale was completed on 2 June 2026, and the station now operates as a Nine Network regional affiliate.

On 28 October 2026, WIN Network has advised changes to the NBN Services in Northern NSW, which took effect on 28 October and added Channel Gold.

== News operation ==
NBN News is the station's flagship local evening news bulletin, airing every weeknight at 5:30pm. The news service employs 60 staff and produces over 20,000 local news stories annually, with local stories in all of its sub-markets. Local bureaus are located in Port Macquarie, Coffs Harbour, Central Coast, Tamworth, Lismore and the Gold Coast.

As a regional affiliate of the Nine Network, the following Nine News programs are relayed to the station: Nine News: Early Edition, Today & Weekend Today, Today Extra & Today Extra: Saturday, Nine's Morning News, Nine's Afternoon News Sydney (Northern NSW only), Nine's Afternoon News Brisbane (Gold Coast only), A Current Affair, Nine News Late, 60 Minutes, Nine News: First at Five and until 2020, Nine News Now.

Prior to the network rebrand on 1 July 2016, Nine's Morning News was only broadcast on special occasions.

In the Hunter and the Central Coast, it is the only local news bulletin, as rival networks Seven and Network 10 provide news updates as part of fulfilling local quota requirements. From 2017 to 2021, the station also provided local weather segments for Nine's regional NSW, Victoria and Queensland bulletins.

Following the sale of NBN to WIN, it was announced NBN News was reduced from a one hour, seven day a week bulletin to a half an hour, Monday to Friday regional news program, airing at 5:30 pm, as of 29 June 2026. The final weekend edition of NBN News aired on 21 June 2026, and the final one hour edition of NBN News aired on 26 June 2026. The program remains at the NBN studios in Newcastle. Nine News Sydney began broadcasting into Northern NSW at 6 pm, seven days a week, as of 27 June 2026.

On 2nd November 2026, NBN News switched to pre-recorded presentation as the bulletin control room returned to Newcastle and was moved from live studio presentation to a pre-recorded format as of Monday, changing a broadcasting tradition spanning decades.

=== News department history ===
Throughout its history, NBN News produced Good Morning News, Good Evening News, News Night, NBN Evening News, and NBN Late Edition News and currently running NBN News.

NBN was the first to launch an hour-long news bulletin in April 1972 from its long-time Mosbri Crescent building, and from launch night until the 1980s, Murray Finlay was the face of NBN's news bulletins, and was one of Australia's longest serving newsreaders. In 1975, Finlay was joined by Ray Dinneen, who went onto become its main anchor until retirement in December 2010. In 1979, the news service received an award for its coverage of the Star Hotel riot.

On 1 March 1985, Jim Sullivan began his career as NBN's news director, which has ultimately led him to become Australia's longest serving news director. The station's coverage of the tragic events of the 1989 Newcastle earthquake was beamed throughout the world, with NBN's reporters also being interviewed by international news services.

During the 1990s, NBN also produced breakfast, afternoon and late night bulletins, however this was later replaced by the Nine Network's Nightline bulletin, and subsequently, other national bulletins from Nine News.

On 11 September 2001 liaising with NBN News director Jim Sullivan, NBN Late Edition News producer Matthew Carden secured a live feed through the Nine Network of ABC America enabling first pictures to be aired of the New York attacks within minutes. When the program went on air a short time later, newsreader Jodi McKay handed over to ABC News America's coverage of events, anchored by Peter Jennings. The bulletin was extended until 1am when NBN handed over to TCN for the start of almost five days of continuous national coverage.

In 2006, NBN aired its 20,000th news bulletin during the week of 26 March; commemorating the event, NBN News produced five news specials that summarised the prior 44 years of news production.

In mid 2006, Natasha Beyersdorf took over as the network's main female newsreader after Melinda Smith stepped down from the role. Paul Lobb took over as the network's main male newsreader and one of the network's local identities after Ray Dinneen retired on 17 December 2010.

In December 2014, Mike Rabbitt retired from reading sport on NBN News after nearly 30 years with the station. Mitchell Hughes was appointed his replacement.

Following the appointment of Kylie Blucher as the station's managing director, NBN News opener and graphics were relaunched, aligning with Nine's metropolitan and Darwin stations, yet retaining the well-known theme music composed by Laurence Schuberth. For the first time, the title cards used on Nine News were adapted as part of the refresh. Although a "lite" version of the graphics was introduced in February 2014, it did not become identical with Nine News until April 2016. Following the relaunch of Nine News graphics on 16 October of that year, NBN News refreshed its presentation by phases. The opener and title cards were first updated, followed by its weather graphics in February 2017 (when it began providing weather for then-Nine's affiliate CTC until 2021). A new set based on the previous Nine News sets was introduced on 7 August. The rest of the graphics were soon updated to the then-current Nine News look on 15 October 2018. On 19 January 2020, NBN News was updated to reflect the current Nine News graphics updated on the same day.

In December 2020, Paul Lobb and Natasha Beyersdorf marked 10 years as weeknight news presenters on the network. Coincidentally, it marked 10 years since Paul Lobb replaced Ray Dinneen as main male news presenter and one of the network's local identities back in 2010.

In August 2021, as part of Jenny Webber's appointment to NBN's day-to-day operations, major changes were imposed on NBN News: the station's Head of News Blake Doyle and Chief of Staff Andy Lobb were made redundant, taking with them a combined 40 years experience in local television production, with former Nine Perth reporter Darius Winterfield and former Nine Adelaide reporter Olivia Grace Curran to replace them as head of news and chief of staff, respectively. 20 positions were affected and 5 of its staff were redeployed to Nine's QTQ studios in Brisbane, where NBN News will begin master control operations from November. It was also confirmed that the new studio in Honeysuckle Drive will be automated with a state-of-the-art set similar to the current Nine News set in North Sydney, with construction that began from May 2021. It is said that there will be closer ties with Nine News including more opportunities for camera operators, reporters and journalists. Coincidentally, the QTQ master control they will be using was the same master control used for Nine News' regional bulletins across Queensland from 2017 to 2021, when Nine had its 5-year programming supply agreement with SCA's regional Queensland station TNQ. The new master control site also formally introduces the Nine News theme remix of Cool Hand Luke's "Tar Sequence" to NBN News, formally replacing numerous themes commissioned separately in the past 60 years. The new arrangements for NBN News began on 8 November 2021.

On 13 December 2021, it was announced that Lobb was made redundant after a decade as weeknight news presenter and almost 30 years with the network. Gavin Morris replaced Lobb as weeknight news presenter and one of the network's main male personalities in addition to presenting the weather.

NBN News was reduced to a 30 minute pre recorded weeknight bulletin in June 2026 following Nine selling the station to the WIN Corporation. The programme was also shifted to 5.30pm to be in line with other WIN News bulletin that are produced out of Wollongong. Nine News Sydney currently airs at 6 pm on weeknights and weekends, in lieu of a NBN News weekend bulletin.

== Programming ==
Until midway through the 2000s, NBN had always produced some local programming, and had set a record for most local programming and transmission hours in its first week of operation. It was also a member of Australian Television Facilities, and had a hand in the production of drama series Silent Number. Since NBN's purchase by the owners of the Nine Network in May 2007, then merged into the network in August 2016, local programming on the station has decreased significantly. Since the move to Honeysuckle, local programming has ceased altogether with NBN News the only local production on the station. In 1963, NBN won the Logie Award for Enterprising Programming (which was only for country stations), and another Outstanding Contribution by a Regional Station award in 1978. NBN purchased the Romper Room franchise from Fremantle International in 1967, which broadcast for over three decades. The original hostess was Miss Anne, followed by Miss Lyn, Miss Pauline and finally, Miss Kim who hosted the program until its demise due to 'political correctness'. (For example, a favourite feature called 'bounce-the-ball' was deemed inappropriate because not all children could bounce a ball). At first the 'Miss's' were assisted by NBN's station mascot, Buttons the Cat, who underwent a number of incarnations as its costume aged and became outdated. Later, Buttons was retired, being replaced by Humphrey B Bear (as NBN had gained the rights to the character through their purchase of Southern Television Corporation), A Local suited character was then determined to be more suitable for a regional television station and the concept of Big Dog was created, the character and suit were created in Wyong on the NSW Central Coast and Big Dog came into being.

Local travel agency Jayes presented their own travel show, Travel Time with Jayes, broadcast on Sunday nights for over 20 years, starting in 1962. Also, every four years, NBN produced a live 24-hour telethon to raise money for local charities. However, due to NBN's affiliation with the Nine Network from 1991 onwards, these telethons were no longer viable with the last occurring in 2002.

NBN premiered Today Extra in 1989. The lifestyle program was broadcast three days per week as part of NBN's day-time line-up. On 3 January 2007, it was announced that NBN would axe Today Extra, claiming it was no longer economically viable, with a drop in ratings and a shrinking advertising base. The program's axing ended the career for former weatherman Nat Jeffery, who presented the program for 18 years, and worked at the station for 28 years. The Today Extra name was later used for a rebrand of Mornings on the Nine Network (NBN's affiliation partner) in 2016.

In 2015, NBN produced a local children's program which aired on the GO! Channel (later shortened today as 9Go!) called So There. The program was presented by NBN News reporter Renee Fedder. It lasted eight episodes.

In August 2018, the station announced a new lifestyle program called Location Lifestyle Living. The show featured a mix of lifestyle, lighthearted segments, interviews, renovation tips and real estate stories. Craig Rosevear and Renovation expert Naomi Finlay hosted the program. It ran until October. The program was renewed for a second season and aired from 7 September 2019 – 9 November 2019. Finlay however, did not return for Season 2, she was replaced by then NBN News reporter Georgia Maher. The program was renewed for a third season, traditionally the program is broadcast from late August to Early November, but due to the COVID-19 pandemic, the third season started its broadcast in late November and premiered on Saturday 14 November 2020. Craig Rosevear is now solo host due to the departure of Georgia Maher in early 2020. The show was not renewed for a fourth season, most likely due to the extended COVID lockdown, and due to staffing changes and cuts at the station in relation to the move to new studios at Honeysuckle.

In 2020, the station expanded into digital programming, with the launch of Amplified a music show giving local music a voice and home to some of the best up and coming musicians. The program was hosted by Matt Field and aired at 8 pm Thursdays on NBN's Facebook page, episodes were then repeated on 9Go! on Saturday afternoons. It lasted one season.

In late April 2020, the station launched into the sports market with the launch of Knights to Remember, a weekly show looking back on some of the best moments of football games featuring the Newcastle Knights team over many years. The program was presented by NBN News Sport Reporters Stephen Mount and Kate Haberfield and is broadcast at 12 pm Saturdays. The program was a joint venture between NBN and real estate agent 'MacDonald Jones Homes' and lasted one season.

As of 2026, NBN primarily airs Nine Network programming mixed with local weather updates during the afternoon news, regular NBN news updates through the evening, the main NBN News bulletin at 5:30pm and some local programming including the Newcastle Anzac Day dawn service live, 60th anniversary specials, Big Dog and localised station IDs and local advertising customised for each market.

== Community support ==
NBN has long been a supporter of many local events and groups in the Northern NSW/Gold Coast region. They are currently sponsors of the Newcastle Northstars in the Australian Ice Hockey League. The station has sponsored the Newcastle Knights NRL rugby league team for most of the 1990s and the 2000s, with the NBN logo visible on the team's uniform. The station also sponsored the Gold Coast Seagulls in 1995 and the Gold Coast Chargers from 1996 to 1998. The former Hunter Pirates NBL basketball team (and their predecessor, the Newcastle Falcons) as well as the Newcastle United Jets soccer team (and their predecessor, the Newcastle Breakers), have also both received sponsorship from Nine Northern NSW.

== Logos ==
The original NBN logo, featuring the numeral three inside a ring was replaced by several others over the years. The three was used due to the station's frequency allocation, being transmitted on VHF channel 3 from a transmitter atop Mount Sugarloaf near Newcastle. By 1977, the logo was updated with the letters NBN replacing the numeral three. The blue and green logo coincided with the renaming of the station from Channel 3 to the current name, NBN Television, and its parent company subsequently renaming from Newcastle Broadcasting and Television Corporation to NBN Limited on 22 November 1979.

Despite pressure from the Nine Network to adopt the nine dots, NBN Television retained its logo for a few years after aggregation. However, in 1994, NBN added nine dots into a new logo designed similarly to the Nine Network's, and also began using Nine's on-air promotion, with the NBN logo replacing Nine's. In 1997, the dots were changed to spheres.

Three-dimensions were added to the letters NBN in 2002, coinciding with a revamp of the station's on-air identity, concurrently with the Nine Network. On 30 January 2006, the station relaunched its logo to coincide with the Nine Network's fiftieth year of broadcasting. The new logo designed by Bruce Dunlop Associates saw the removal of the nine dots, with a blue square added to behind the letters NBN. However, in 2008, the nine dots were reinstated into the logo and the dots are first 3D discs in 2008, then 2D dots in January 2009, then later spheres in September 2009.

In April 2012, NBN Television's identity changed, applying the logo in different colours such as red, green, purple and more. It is also reminiscent of the 2002 ident package.

Since July 2016, the NBN logo has only been used as a digital on-screen graphic and for use for NBN News and station identification with the remaining identity using Nine Network branding.
