= Sandro Nocentini =

Italian painter (born 1966)

- Born: 1966 (age 59–60); Rome, Italy
- Occupation: Artist
- Partner: James Treble
- Children: 2

Sandro Nocentini (born 1966) is an Italian artist, living and working in Australia. He is a figurative painter, whose work has been described as "cubist-futurist". He was awarded the Sir John Sulman Prize for Painting in 2005.

== Life and work ==
Sandro Nocentini was born in Rome, Italy. His early artistic influences were from his artist mother, Alba Pratesi, and her mentor Aldo Bandinelli.

He arrived in Australia in 1993, and graduated with a degree in Fine Arts at the National Art School. The new environment of Australia had a significant effect on his work. He staged his first solo exhibition in 1996.

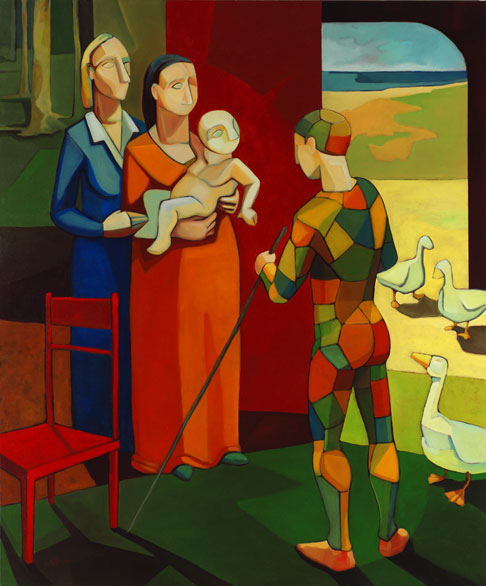
SandroNocentiniMySonHasTwoMothers2005

In 2005, Nocentini was awarded the $10,000 Sir John Sulman Prize for his painting My Son Has Two Mothers. The work was exhibited at the Art Gallery of New South Wales. The inspiration for it came from the artist's "assisting two friends to conceive a child"; Nocentini has shown himself as a harlequin, a reference to Picasso, whose influence is apparent in the work.

That year he was the judge, with Judith Blackall, of Inner West Cultural Services' Walking the Street art prizes.

In 2006, he was one of the contributing artists to the fund-raising Changing Nature 06 Greenpeace exhibition and auction in Sydney.

His painting of Princess Diana was included in the book, Diana in Art, compiled by Mern Mehmet (Pop Art Books).

He describes his style as "cubist-futurist" and said of his work:

The accurate description of physical reality is not as important to me as depicting people through their most intimate and silent moments... I paint only about feelings.

Art Critic Simonne Jameson said about Nocentini, "Even a brief sampling can suggest the quality, at once poetic, rationale of Nocentini's mind."

In 2016 Nocentini published the digital version of three books for children he wrote and illustrated: The Dog With No Name, and other short tails, The Broken Mirror, and other short stories and The Christmas we Forgot.

Nocentini lives in Sydney, with his partner Interior Designer James Treble and their two children.

== See also ==
- Art of Australia
- List of Australian artists
