= 9Life =

Australian digital multichannel

- Logo used since 2015
- Type: Lifestyle programming
- Country: Australia
- Broadcast area: Sydney, Melbourne, Brisbane, Adelaide, Perth, Darwin, Northern NSW and Gold Coast, Regional QLD, Southern NSW/ACT, Broken Hill NSW, Griffith NSW, Regional VIC, Mildura VIC, Tasmania, Spencer Gulf SA, Eastern SA, Regional WA
- Network: Nine Network

Programming
- Language: English
- Picture format: 576i SDTV; 1080i HDTV

Ownership
- Owner: Nine Entertainment
- Sister channels: Channel 9; 9HD; 9Gem; 9Go! 9Rush; Extra

History
- Launched: 26 November 2015; 10 years ago

Links
- Website: 9now.com.au

Availability

Terrestrial
- TCN Sydney (DVB-T): 1059 @ 8 (191.5 MHz)
- GTV Melbourne (DVB-T): 1074 @ 8 (191.5 MHz),
- QTQ Brisbane/Sunshine Coast (DVB-T): 1030 @ 8 (191.5 MHz)
- NWS Adelaide (DVB-T): 1106 @ 8 (191.5 MHz)
- STW Perth/Mandurah (DVB-T): 1026 @ 8 (191.5 MHz)
- Freeview Nine metro (virtual): 94
- Freeview Nine affiliate (virtual): 83/93

Streaming media
- 9Now

9Life is an Australian free-to-air digital television multichannel owned by Nine Entertainment. The channel airs mostly foreign lifestyle and reality programs, with the channel having a licensing agreement with Discovery Inc. (previously Scripps Networks Interactive) for the distribution of many formats.

== History ==
The channel was first announced on 28 October 2015, and began broadcasting on 26 November 2015 in metropolitan areas on channel 94. 9Life replaced the main broadcast of datacasting channel Extra, which was moved to channel 95 to replace its timeshift channel Extra 2.

9Life began being included in the official OzTAM ratings on 1 December 2015, where it recorded a 2.3% primetime share, nearly double that of sister channel 9Gem, which has been the biggest channel launch since 9Go! in 2009.

Nine’s then owned and operated station NBN announced on 16 February 2016 on their website that they would carry 9Life from 1 March 2016 on channel 84.

Regional affiliate WIN Television announced on 10 February 2016 it would launch 9Life in the coming months. It was later confirmed the channel would launch on 1 March 2016 on channel 84. Four WIN regions were excluded from the 1 March launch date. Griffith, Tasmania, and Eastern South Australia did not receive the channel until 2 March 2016 due to technical issues. In addition, the Regional WA station did not launch the channel until 10 March 2016.

On 29 April 2016, Nine announced that it had signed a new affiliation deal with Southern Cross Austereo, dumping WIN Television as its primary affiliate starting 1 July 2016. Upon the switchover, 9Life became unavailable as WIN ceased broadcasting it and Southern Cross did not have the technical equipment to broadcast the channel. Three months later, the channel recommenced broadcasting in the Regional Queensland, Southern NSW/ACT and Regional Victoria markets on channel 54 on 17 July 2016. This left Regional WA, Tasmania, Mildura and Griffith without the service.

In 2017, 9Life began broadcasting in Darwin via Nine's O&O station, NTD.

On 30 September 2018, 9Life recommenced broadcasting to Tasmania, this time via TDT Tasmania, and it became available to the Spencer Gulf/Broken Hill region (via GTS/BKN) for the first time.

On 12 March 2021, Nine announced that it would return to WIN Television as its regional affiliate in most markets beginning on 1 July 2021, in a deal that will last at least seven years. From 1 August 2021, 9Life is available in regional areas via WIN Television on channel 83, in which it replaced the Sky News on WIN channel. This returned the channel to Regional WA, Mildura and Griffith after an absence of five years.

== Programming ==
The majority of programming comes from Discovery's lifestyle and reality shows produced for an American audience, some of which have already aired through the Foxtel and Fetch TV platforms.

=== Current programming ===
- Backyard Blitz
- The Block
- Fixer Upper
- Flip or Flop
- Flip or Flop Follow Up
- The Garden Gurus
- Getaway
- Home of the Year
- House Hunters
- House Hunters International
- House Hunters Renovation
- House Hunters Off The Grid
- Hunting Vintage
- Island Hunters
- Luxury Homes Revealed
- Masters of Flip
- Postcards
- Ready Set Reno
- The Road to Miss Universe Australia
- Room to Improve
- Texas Home Improvement with Jim Dutton
- The Texas Bucket List
- Tiny House Hunters
- Tiny House, Big Living
- Vintage Flip

=== Former programming ===
- The Bachelor US
- The Bachelorette US
- Below Deck
- Big Rich Texas
- Come Dine with Me UK
- Dance Moms
- Dash Dolls
- Delish
- Flipping Out
- Hollywood Medium with Tyler Henry
- Keeping Up with the Kardashians
- Kourtney and Khloé Take The Hamptons
- Kourtney and Khloé Take Miami
- Kourtney and Kim Take Miami
- Kourtney and Kim Take New York
- Ladies of London
- The Millionaire Matchmaker
- Million Dollar Listing Los Angeles
- Million Dollar Listing Miami
- Million Dollar Listing New York
- Million Dollar Listing San Francisco
- Mom's A Medium
- The Real Housewives
- Top Chef
- WAGS
- WAGS Miami

== Availability ==
9Life is available in standard definition in metropolitan areas and regional areas through Nine Network owned-and-operated stations: TCN Sydney, GTV Melbourne, QTQ Brisbane, NWS Adelaide and STW Perth. It is also available through affiliated stations WIN Southern NSW/ACT, NTD Darwin, NBN Northern New South Wales, GTS/BKN Broken Hill NSW, AMN Griffith NSW, GTS/BKN Spencer Gulf SA, Port Augusta SA, SES/RTS Eastern SA, RTQ Regional QLD, VTV Regional VIC, STV Mildura, TVT Tasmania and WOW Regional WA.

The 9Life channel is not available in the Remote Central & Eastern TV market only.

== Slogan ==
- 26 November 2015 – present: Starts Here
