= Peter Switzer =

Australian business commentator

- Education: University of New South Wales
- Occupations: Entrepreneur and Business and Financial Commentator
- Years active: 1970–present
- Employer: Switzer Group
- Known for: Business, Media presenting, Publisher and Financial Adviser
- Spouse: Maureen Switzer
- Children: Marty Switzer and Alex Switzer
- Relatives: Jess Blanch and Renee Carl

Peter Switzer is an Australian business and financial commentator, broadcasting presenter, lecturer, author, and publisher of Harper's Bazaar Australia/New Zealand.

== Biography ==
Switzer founded his own company The Switzer Group which has since grown into three diverse businesses involving media, financial services and investment management . Switzer also runs and is a contributor to self-titled website Switzer Daily, which boasts a number of contributors including media colleagues David Speers, Janine Perrett and Steve Price.

Switzer has also been a lecturer in economics at the University of New South Wales. He also hosted pre-recorded interviews which are available on the Qantas in-flight entertainment system for over a decade.

Switzer previously presented finance reports on the ARN and Triple M networks.

== Switzer Media ==
=== Publications ===
- Russh (since 2010)
- Harper's Bazaar Australia/New Zealand (since 2021)
- Esquire Australia (since 2023)
- Australian Men's Health (since 2023)
- Australian Women's Health (since 2023)
- Hodinkee Australia (since 2026)

== Published works ==
- Who's afraid of the GST? (1998) (Prentice Hall) ISBN 978-0-72481-266-0
- Small Business Start-up Guide : Secrets for Success (2002) (Allen & Unwin) ISBN 978-1-86508-644-6
- Join the Rich Club (2019) (RUSSH Media) ISBN 9780648551102
