= Australian News Channel =

Australian media company

Australian News Channel Pty Ltd
- Type: Subsidiary
- Industry: Media
- Founded: 1995; 31 years ago
- Founders: British Sky Broadcasting; Seven West Media; Publishing and Broadcasting Limited
- Headquarters: Sydney, Australia
- Areas served: Australia; New Zealand
- Key people: Paul Whittaker (CEO)
- Services: News broadcasting
- Net income: A$2.1 million (2015–16)
- Total assets: A$25 million (2015–16)
- Number of employees: 204 (2015–16)
- Parent: News Corp Australia
- Website: www.newscorpaustralia.com

Australian News Channel Pty Ltd is a subsidiary of News Corp Australia. It owns news broadcasting channel News24, its sister channels News24 World and News24 Weather, New Zealand News Channel (which operates News24 New Zealand) as well as international streaming service Australia Channel.

== History ==
=== Origins ===
Australian News Channel Pty Ltd (ANC), was founded in 1995 when Sky News Australia was launched. It was owned by British Sky Broadcasting, Seven West Media and Publishing & Broadcasting Limited.

In 2013, ANC granted A$20 million in funding to Sky News Australia to be used over three years.

In 2014, ANC partnered with Globecast to launch an international streaming service Australia Channel, which broadcasts five channels to subscribers outside Australia. It was launched after ANC bid to operate the Australian Government funded Australia Network contract, before the tender was controversially scrapped.

Until 2015, Sky News was responsible for producing New Zealand's Prime News – First at 5:30 from Sydney, hosted by Eric Young with filming taking place in Prime's Albany studios. It lost the contract to MediaWorks and subsequently ceased broadcasting a local New Zealand bulletin.

With the carriage deal between Australian News Channel and dominant subscription television platform Foxtel due to expire in 2017, reported as either February or December, media speculation increased that News Corp Australia, which co-owns Foxtel, would attempt to acquire a majority stake in the company. On 26 February 2015 it was reported that News Corp Australia launched an A$25 million bid for full ownership of Australian News Channel.

In June 2015, it was reported that ANC's stakeholders had rejected a News Corp takeover offer of A$20 million, with the owners wanting a minimum of A$50 million. Following a breakdown in a News Corp buyout, further reports suggested Nine Entertainment could sell its stake to a joint arrangement between Seven West Media and News Corp.

=== Acquisition by News Corp ===
The entire company was acquired by News Corp Australia in December 2016. In December 2017, it was reported that News Corp and Telstra were in a carriage dispute over the price Foxtel pays to carry Sky News channels after the existing deal expired at the end of the calendar year, worth over A$30 million per year. News Corp was requesting an increase to the Sky News carriage fee, which has not been raised for more than a decade, while Foxtel co-owner Telstra was opposed. A new deal was agreed upon and transmission was not interrupted.

== Assets ==
- News24
- Sky News Business Channel (2008–2018)
- News24 Weather
- Sky News Election Channel (2016–2017)
- News24 World
- Your Money (2018–2019; with Nine Entertainment)

Domestic free-to-air

- News24 Regional

Outside Australia

- News24 New Zealand
- Australia Channel (with Globecast)
