= News24 Weather =

Australian weather television channel

- Type: Weather news
- Country: Australia
- Headquarters: Sydney

Programming
- Language: English

Ownership
- Owner: News Corp Australia
- Parent: Australian News Channel
- Sister channels: News24; News24 World

History
- Launched: 1 January 1999; 27 years ago (Austar); December 2002; 23 years ago (Foxtel)
- Former names: Sky News Weather Channel; The Weather Channel; Weather 21

Availability

Terrestrial
- Foxtel Streaming: 601

News24 Weather, formerly Sky News Weather Channel, is an Australian television channel owned by Australian News Channel. Launched on 1 January 1999, the channel broadcasts weather forecasts and weather-related news and analysis 24 hours a day.

Programing runs on a 15-minute loop of local, national, regional, dam level and rainfall forecasts, as well as continuous coverage of extreme weather if required & seasonal reports.

News24 Weather also runs live weekdays the News24 Regional-produced breakfast program News24 Breakfast from 06:00 to 08:30.

== History ==
The Weather Channel logo prior to the Sky News Weather Channel rebrand in 2013

Sky News Weather logo prior to July 2019

News24 Weather launched as Sky News Weather Channel started broadcasting on 1 January 1999 under the name "Weather 21": channel 21 on the Austar channel line-up. Weather 21 was set up by Cox Inall Communications and the meteorological firm The Weather Company and was owned by Austar. The programming was pitched to Austar's largely rural and regional audience. Initial presenters on the channel were Allan Humphries, Lyndal Davies, and meteorologist Mark Hardy, broadcasting live from 06:00 to 22:00 daily, with the overnight programming consisting of an automated loop of forecasts, satellite, and radar, accompanied by music.

In early 2000, no longer located at 21, the name was changed to "The Weather Channel". As the hours of live presentation were extended, presenters Tracey Malmborg, Jaynie Seal, Rebecca LeTourneau and Garry Youngberry were added.

In 2003 Austar sold the channel to XYZ Networks and TWC appeared on the Foxtel network, morphing to better suit the now largely metropolitan audience. Foxtel's Digitals platform extended its distribution with an Open TV interactive weather application, Weather Active.

Major changes in 2004 included logo, graphics, programming line-up and a new version of Weather Active for Foxtel Digital.

In the middle of June 2008, the Weather Channel again had a major change with its graphics as its programming line-up grew.

Weather content on the channel is provided by Metra Information Limited and the Australian Bureau of Meteorology.

=== Change of Management and Rebranding ===
In the wake of the 2012 merger of Foxtel and Austar, and the subsequent dissolution of XYZ Networks, it was announced that from 30 November 2012 management and operational responsibility for The Weather Channel would be assumed by Sky News Australia, with The Weather Channel to be re-launched as Sky News Weather in 2013. The rebrand took place on 25 January 2013.

== App & Streaming (2024–current) ==
The News24 App offers a free to use app showing the latest weather forecasts. The News24 App also offers a subscription based live streaming of News24 Weather.

== Current Presenters (as of January 2025) ==
- Jaynie Seal 1999–2004 & 2012–current (Hosting News Breakfast Weekdays)
- Rob Sharpe – Meteorologist 2017–current
- Alison Osborne – Meteorologist 2019–current
- Rhiannon Elston 2020–current
- Emma Wightman 2017–current
- James Preston 2022–current
- Nikolina Kharoufeh 2022–current
- Rachael Jones 2023–current
- Stevie Jacobs 2024–current
- Wendy John 2024–current
- Julia Seymour 2024–current
- Marina Neuman (Meteorologist) 2024–current
- Tamsin Green – Meteorologist 2025–current

=== Past Presenters ===
- Graham Creed – Meteorologist 2000–2007 – (Moved to the ABC, now retired)
- Allan Humphries
- Mark Hardy – Meteorologist
- Tracey Malmborg
- Sally Ayhan
- Christina Birtles
- Kyly Boldy
- Lee Brooks
- Lyndal Davies
- Amanda Duval
- Josh Holt – Meteorologist (Network 10 Sydney)
- Rose Jacobs
- Dave Kirwan
- Danielle Bowern
- Amy Greenbank 2011–2018 (Moved to ABC Sydney)
- Gavin Morris
- Reuben Mourad
- Ed Phillips 2004–2005 (Temptation Host, Nine Network)
- Magdalena Roze
- Angela Tsun
- Jane Bunn – Meteorologist (Moved to WIN TV, currently with Seven News Melbourne)
- Danielle Robertson
- Tom Saunders – Meteorologist 1999–2009 (Moved to ABC Sydney)
- Ben Domensino – Meteorologist (Weatherzone Meteorologist)
- Richard Whitaker
- Bradlyn Oaks – Meteorologist 2023–2024
- Vanessa O'Hanlon (former ABC News Breakfast Weather Presenter) 2023
- Fouad Haidar 2023–2024
