= TVW =

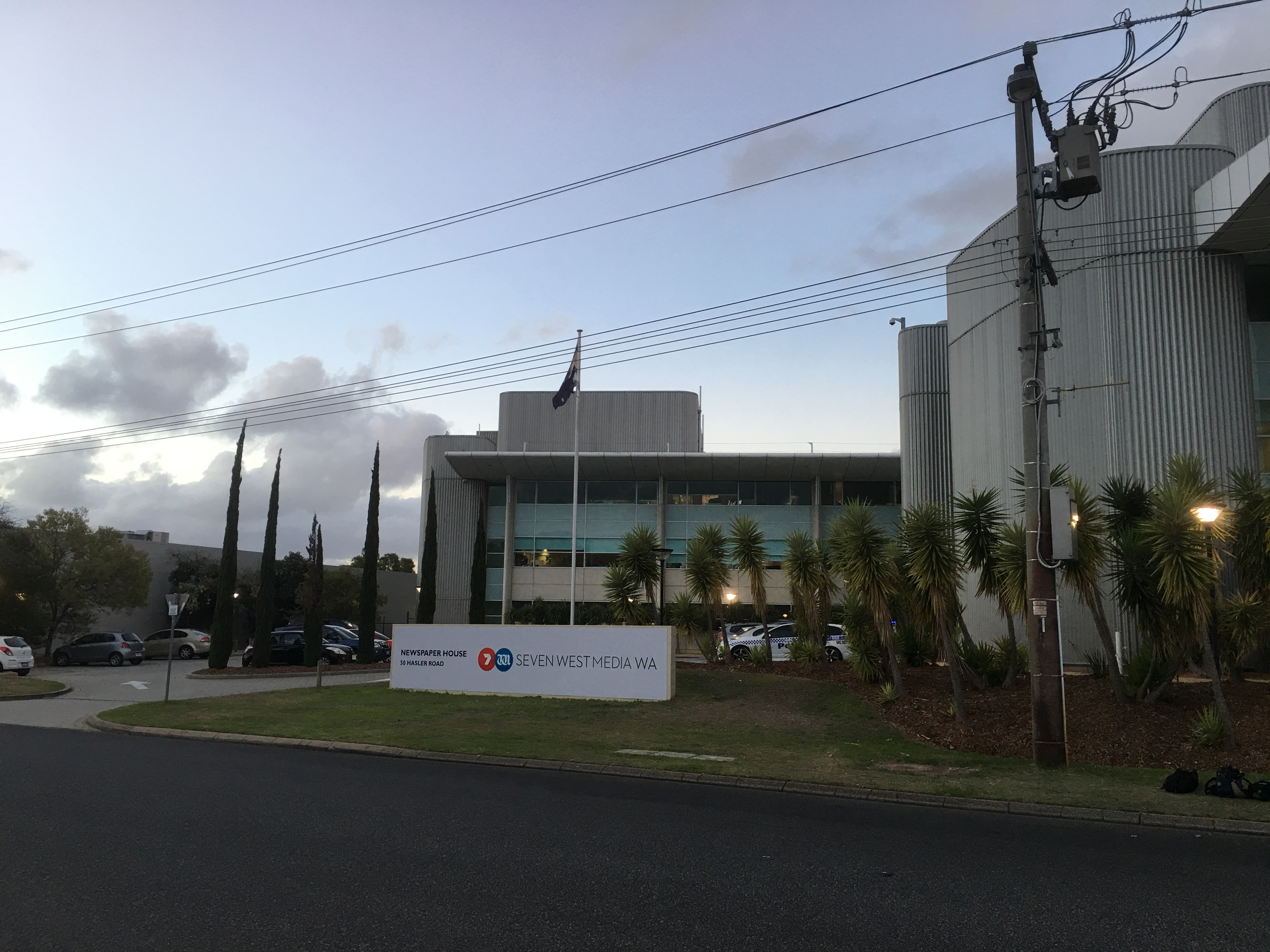
- Perth, Western Australia; Australia
- Channels: Digital: 6 (VHF); Virtual: 7
- Branding: Seven

Programming
- Language: English
- Network: Seven

Ownership
- Owner: Seven Media Group; (Channel Seven Perth Pty Ltd)

History
- First air date: 16 October 1959
- Former channel number: 7 (VHF) (analog) (1959–2013)
- Former affiliations: Independent (1959–1977)
- Call sign meaning: Television Western Australia

Technical information
- Licensing authority: Australian Communications and Media Authority
- ERP: 50 kW (digital)
- HAAT: 280 m (digital)
- Transmitter coordinates: 32°0′30″S 116°5′3″E

Links
- Website: 7plus.com.au

TVW is a television station broadcasting in Perth, Western Australia, wholly owned by Seven Media Group. It was the first television station in Western Australia, commencing broadcasting on 16 October 1959. It broadcasts a modulated 64-QAM signal of five DVB channels (Seven Network, 7two, 7mate, 7flix and Racing.com). The primary channel was available as a PAL-B modulated simulcast on VHF channel 7 at 182.25 MHz before being discontinued in the first half of 2013; it had been the station's primary signal since its inception. The TVW callsign stands for TV (Television) Western Australia.

== History ==
On 13 October 1958, the first commercial television licence in Perth was granted by the Minister for Posts and Telegraphs to TVW Limited, a subsidiary of West Australian Newspapers (WAN), publisher of Perth's daily newspaper, The West Australian. Under the then founding general manager of the station James Cruthers, TVW commenced broadcasting on 16 October 1959. The Governor of Western Australia, Sir Charles Gairdner opened the station at 7.30pm that night. Some of the first programs included Leave It to Beaver, Sea Hunt, Father Knows Best, Gunsmoke, Perry Mason, The Epilogue and a local show called Spotlight which featured Rolf Harris.

The signal was broadcast from the station's transmitter site at Bickley in the Darling Ranges.

TVW-7 did not have a rival commercial television station until 1965 when STW-9 commenced broadcasting. However the presence of a rival did not have a large negative impact on TVW, at least in the early years. In fact a survey by its rival found that more people agreed with a statement that "TVW fulfilled their viewing needs, and it would be a matter of indifference to them if the new station were to cease transmissions". The advantage TVW built up in its six years as sole commercial operator flowed through for many more years to come, some would even argue that it is still present today considering how well Seven performs in the market compared to Nine, which for nearly two decades until the mid-2000s, generally won comfortably nationally.

After STW-9 entered the market, a "cartel" was formed between the two stations for the duty of buying from both Australian and overseas production sources. The two stations set up a separate company, TV Facilities (the two stations being 50%/50% partners). This allowed the stations to purchase programs cheaper than if they were two separate entities, which would bid on shows and subsequently raise prices. This partnership was disliked by Eastern States stations who could not increase their charges to the extent which they would have liked. Allocation of programs was decided by a coin toss, which would allow the winner to pick first and then alternate the picking of programs. However TVW would always be in a more dominant position as it had the rights to continuing shows from the previous six years as well as half of the new programs.

In 1971 TVW Enterprises purchased SAS-10 in Adelaide, now SAS-7. Eight years later, TVW finally took on an affiliation, aligning with the Seven stations in the East. In 1982 TVW and SAS were purchased by Bell Group. This soon posed a problem for SAS, since Network Ten officials were unwilling to discuss network plans with Bell given that it owned a Ten affiliate and a Seven affiliate. To solve this problem, SAS swapped affiliations and frequencies with Adelaide's original Seven affiliate, ADS, in 1987.

In 1988, Perth finally got full network service when NEW signed on and aligned with Ten. In 1988, TVW was sold to Qintex. Qintex collapsed a year later, leaving TVW in the hands of receivers. In 1991 the network was floated on the stock exchange and, by 1995, Kerry Stokes was in charge of both TVW and the rest of the network. Since then, the station has continued to enjoy a dominant share of television ratings in the Perth market.

TVW commenced digital television transmission in January 2001, broadcasting on VHF Channel 6 while maintaining analogue transmission on VHF Channel 7.

The analogue signal for TVW was shut off at 09:00 on 16 April 2013.

During the digital switchover in Perth, the final image for TVW’s analogue signal was an advertisement break of a Toyota car ad before Sunrise.

Stokes bought a 15 percent stake in West Australian newspapers in 2006. In 2011, West Australian Newspapers bought the Seven Network to form Seven West Media, thus fully reuniting TVW with its founding owner. In February 2015, TVW moved from their original broadcasting facility in Gay Street, Dianella to a new HD broadcast centre in Osborne Park located within West Australian Newspapers.

== Programming ==
Seven Perth for the most part follows the programming of the Seven Network.

Locally produced programs have included:

- Go Racing: News/discussion about the racing scene in both Perth and the Eastern States
- Have a Go TV: Features segments on travel, finance and investment, sport and recreation, health and wellbeing. Hosted by Tod Johnston.
- Home In WA: Lifestyle, building and renovation
- Fishing Western Australia: Explores fishing in WA.
- Our WA: A long-running series of specials which highlight a specific aspect of WA life
- Flashpoint: A current affairs program discussing issues that matter to West Australians. Hosted by Tim McMillan and featuring Peter Rowsthorn.

Locally produced programs, which can also be seen around Australia through the Seven Network and affiliates include:

- The Force: Behind the Line: Observational documentary about the Western Australia Police

=== Filmed at Dianella ===
Studio 1

Until February 2015 (when broadcast moved to new Osborne Park HD facility)

- Seven News
- Today Tonight (Perth Edition)
- Seven 4.30 News (Perth Edition)

Past broadcasts from Dianella studios

- Channel Seven Perth Telethon (until 2003)
- The Early Bird Show
- A*mazing – Previously filmed at BTQ-7 from 1994–1996.
- Time Masters – Previously filmed at BTQ-7 from 1996.
- Fat Cat's Funtime Show
- Good Morning Perth
- Jenny Seaton Live
- Scratch and Win Telespin
- The Adventures of Bush Patrol
- Family Feud
- In Perth Tonight
- Rothman's World of Football
- The Underground Video Show
- The Late Late Breakfast Show
- Reach for the Stars
- Turpie Tonight
- $50,000 Letter Box
- Spellbound
- Brooksey's Footy Show/The Footy Club/Basil's Footy Show
- It's Academic
- Perth at 5
- FMTV
- What A Week
- Today
- Channel 7 News/Seven National News/Seven Nightly News/Seven News: 1959–2010
- State Affair: 1984–1989
- Today Tonight: 1995–2010
- Susannah Carr's Land Down Under/World Around Us: 1985–1999
- Sports Centre Seven: 1980s

== News and current affairs ==
=== Seven News ===
Seven News Perth is directed by Ray Kuka and presented by Tim McMillan and Angela Tsun from Sunday to Wednesday and Rick Ardon and Susannah Carr from Thursday to Saturday from Seven and West Australian Newspaper studios located at Osborne Park. Sport is presented by Ryan Daniels on weeknights and Adrian Barich on weekends. Weather is presented by Samantha Jolly on weeknights and Jerrie Demasi on weekends. Seven News Perth is also simulcast on Seven Regional WA formerly GWN7 network to regional and remote areas on Western Australia and Curtin FM in the Perth metropolitan area, but as of 2016, the simulcast on radio had a broadcasting break.

Long standing Seven News Perth presenter Jeff Newman announced his retirement from television on 1 July 2009, and retired from his role on Monday 10 August 2009. He was replaced by former Nine News Perth weather presenter Natalia Cooper, who began her new role during September 2009. Cooper resigned from Seven Perth at the end of 2012 with ex-Nine weather presenter Angela Tsun taking over as her replacement for the 4:30pm news and 6pm weather forecasts.

In 2015, Rick Ardon and Susannah Carr celebrated a thirty-year anniversary as a news reading duo. They are one of the longest serving dual news presenter teams in the world and the dual-presenter format used by Seven News Perth has been highly successful. In contrast to previous struggles seen in Sydney and Melbourne in the late 1990s, Seven News Perth has led in the ratings for decades, well ahead of 10 News First Perth and Nine News Perth by as many as 100,000 viewers.

In February 2020, the Seven Network announced that Tim McMillan would join Angela Tsun to present on weekends.

In February 2022, Basil Zempilas left his nightly sport duties due to other commitments and being the Lord Mayor of Perth, he was replaced by Ryan Daniels but remained a fill-in.

In January 2026, it was announced that Rick Ardon and Susannah Carr would transition to presenting Seven News Perth from Thursday to Saturday, with Tim McMillan and Angela Tsun presenting from Sunday to Wednesday.

News updates for Perth are presented by Angela Tsun, Susannah Carr or Rick Ardon throughout the afternoon and by Susannah Carr or Rick Ardon in the early evening. Yvette Mooney was the weekend news presenter until she was diagnosed with breast cancer in 2007 and subsequently left the network in June 2008. Before the move to the Osborne Park Studios in February 2015, Blake Johnson and Samantha Jolly alternated fortnightly presenting for both Weekend bulletins. Fill-in presenters include Tim McMillan, Angela Tsun and Jerrie Demasi (News), Adrian Barich and Anna Hay (sport) and Jerrie Demasi and Amelia Broun (weather).

=== Presenters ===
Current presenters
Role	Bulletins						
Role	Monday	Tuesday	Wednesday	Thursday	Friday	Saturday	Sunday
News	Angela Tsun (2026–present); Tim McMillan (2026–present)			Rick Ardon (2026–present); Susannah Carr (2026–present)			Angela Tsun (2026–present); Tim McMillan (2026–present)
Sport	Ryan Daniels (2022–present)					Adrian Barich (2007–present)	
Weather	Samantha Jolly (2015–present)					Jerrie Demasi (2026–present)	

==== Former presenters ====
- Yvette Mooney (weekends) – died in 2022

=== Today Tonight ===
Between 1995 and 2019, the nightly news was followed by a locally produced edition of current affairs program Today Tonight hosted by Monika Kos. The program used a mixture of reports from its sister program in Adelaide as well as reports from locally based reporters. Like Seven News Perth, the program was very successful ratings wise, consistently beating its rival A Current Affair.

On 29 November 2019, the show along with its Adelaide counterpart was axed. This followed the axings of the combined Sydney and Melbourne edition, as well as the Queensland edition, in 2014.

== Mascot ==
Seven Perth has long been the home of Fat Cat, the name standing for Francis Aloysius Thomas Cat. Fat Cat is "put to bed" every night at 7.30pm signalling the end of programs suitable for children. Fat Cat, is the last WA television mascot to survive. Longtime rival STW-9 used a large elephant, Flapper, as its mascot and NEW-10 used Kenny Kidna from the Kangaroo Creek Gang as its mascot in addition to GWN’s Doopa Dog from at least 1972 until 2022.

Fat Cat is now mainly used for things to do with Telethon; Fat Cat dolls are sold through Friendlies Chemists & Bendigo Bank for $19.95 to raise money for Telethon.

Seven also has an anthropomorphic TV character "TV Man" (an analogue TV with arms and legs with a red 7 on the screen) as a popular mascot used in on air promos nationally.

== Telethon ==
TVW also produces an annual Telethon for the Princess Margaret Hospital for Children, now relocated and named Perth Children's Hospital, the Telethon Kids Institute and around forty other beneficiaries spread throughout the Western Australian community. Since 1968 it has raised over $500 million (as of 2023 total). Although the fundraising takes place 365 days a year through the community, it culminates in a 26-hour live broadcast from RAC Arena in the heart of Perth city over a weekend, usually in October. Seven network personalities fly to Perth for the weekend to help raise money, as do a lot of Aussie artists. Many international stars have also been part of Telethon over the years, including Michael Jackson, Stevie Wonder, Celine Dion and Harry Connick Jr. The show is simulcasted around the state of Western Australia. This telethon is regarded as the highest fundraising Telethon (per capita) in the world ($13.94 per head of population in WA). In 2017 Channel 7 celebrated its milestone 50th Perth Telethon, raising $36.4m ($10m more than the previous year's record amount) and distributed this to over forty beneficiaries throughout Western Australia. It is broadcast on TVW7 across Perth metro area and across Western Australia.

== Christmas Pageant ==
The station organises an annual Christmas parade through the streets of the Perth central business district, traditionally on the first Saturday of December. It is claimed to be the largest Christmas parade in the southern hemisphere. More than 600 floats and 60,000 participants have taken part in the procession in the history of the parade, which commenced in 1972. Each year several thousand people line the route to watch the parade. It was cancelled twice, in 2015 due to inclement weather and in 2020 due to the COVID-19 Pandemic.

== Broadcasting details ==
Locations of transmitters broadcasting TVW-7

Digital transport frequency: VHF-6 @ 177.5 MHz (Bandwidth: 7 MHz 64-QAM)

Digital channels
LCN	Service	Image quality	Compression quality	Alt image quality	Alt compression quality
7	7	1440x1080i 16:9 HD Lite	H.262 video @ 10770 kbit/s Dolby Digital audio @ 384 kbit/s MPEG-1 Audio Layer II @ 256 kbit/s	720x576i 16:9 SD	H.262 video @ 6500 kbit/s MPEG-1 Audio Layer II @ 256 kbit/s
72	7two	720x576i 16:9 SD	H.262 video @ 6500 kbit/s MPEG-1 Audio Layer II @ 256 kbit/s		
73	7mate	1440x1080i 16:9 HD Lite	H.262 video @ 10770 kbit/s Dolby Digital audio @ 384 kbit/s MPEG-1 Audio Layer II @ 256 kbit/s	720x576i 16:9 SD	H.262 video @ 6500 kbit/s MPEG-1 Audio Layer II @ 256 kbit/s
76	7flix	720x576i 16:9 SD	H.262 video @ 6500 kbit/s MPEG-1 Audio Layer II @ 256 kbit/s		

Note: HD quality switches between 7 and 7mate due to sporting events. Only one channel broadcasts HD at any one time.

== See also ==
- Seven Network
- STW
- NEW (TV station)
- Television broadcasting in Australia

== Sources ==
- Perth Commercial Television After 1965 by Tom O'Regan & Ulla Hiltula
- The Introduction of Television into Western Australia by Eric Fisher
