= Jeff Newman (TV personality) =

Australian television presenter (born 1944)

Jeff Newman OAM
- Born: Jeffrey William Newman; 4 February 1944 (age 82); Peppermint Grove, Western Australia
- Years active: 1963-2009
- Spouse: Pat
- Presenting career
- Country: Australia
- Previous shows: Telethon (main anchor) 1968-2009 (Seven Perth); Seven News (Seven Perth); It's Academic (Seven Perth); The Jeff Newman Show (Nine Perth)

Jeffrey William Newman (born 4 February 1944) is a former Australian television presenter. He was the Seven Network's weather presenter in Perth from 1991 to 2009.

== Media career ==
Newman began his media career with 6GE in Geraldton, Western Australia in early 1963, filling a vacancy left by the departure of Tony Barber. When STW-9 began broadcasting in 1965, Newman became host of The Jeff Newman Show.

After a disagreement with management, he crossed over to the rival TVW-7 in 1967 and worked in various positions within the industry, before joining Seven News in 1982 as a newsreader. He was the weather presenter on Seven News from 1991 to 2009. Newman was also known for his role as Western Australian presenter of It's Academic, a popular school quiz program that ran for ten years from 1969 to 1979 and later revived from 2001 and 2005. He also served as the main anchor host of the annual Perth Telethon between 1968 and 2009.

His brother is Peter Newman, another well-known Perth media personality.

== Retirement ==
Newman announced his retirement on 1 July 2009 and was replaced by Natalia Cooper. He did his last weather broadcast on 10 August 2009.

In 2013 he revealed to The West Australian that he was diagnosed with prostate cancer. He has since recovered.

== Honours ==
Newman won five Logie Awards for the state's most popular male television personality. In 1994 he was awarded the Medal of the Order of Australia for services to charity and fundraising.
