= STW =

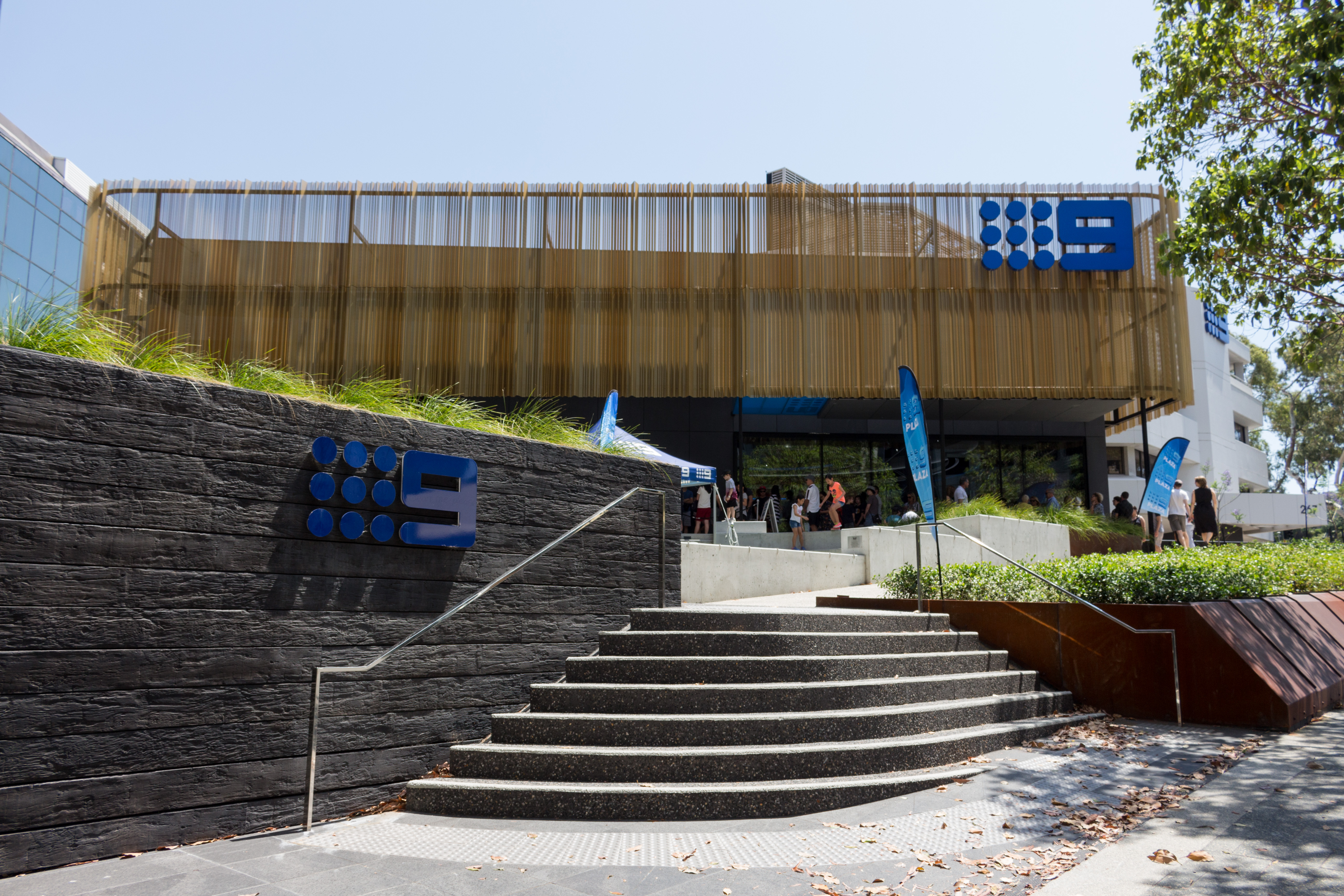
- Nine studios on St Georges Terrace
- Perth, Western Australia; Australia
- Channels: Digital: 8 (VHF); Virtual: 9
- Branding: Nine

Programming
- Language: English
- Affiliations: Nine

Ownership
- Owner: Nine Entertainment; (Swan Television & Radio Broadcasters Pty Ltd)

History
- First air date: 12 June 1965
- Former channel number: Analog: 9 (VHF) (1965–2013)
- Former affiliations: Independent (1965–1978)
- Call sign meaning: Swan Television Western Australia

Technical information
- Licensing authority: ACMA
- ERP: 50 kW (digital)
- HAAT: 317 m (digital)
- Transmitter coordinates: 32°0′45″S 116°3′42″E

Links
- Website: 9now.com.au

STW is an Australian television station owned by the Nine Network that is based in Perth, Western Australia. STW broadcasts from a shared facility transmitter mast located in Carmel. The station callsign, STW, is an acronym of Swan Television, Western Australia.

== History ==
=== Origins ===
In February 1964, Swan Television was awarded a licence to operate Perth's second commercial television station. The company's shareholders at the time included Ansett Transport Industries, which was also preparing to launch ATV-0, the third commercial station in Melbourne, in October that year.

STW-9 began broadcasting at 5.30pm on Saturday 12 June 1965. Broadcasting from a purpose-built studio complex in the Perth suburb of Dianella, the station employed around a hundred staff.

The station was officially opened by the Premier of Western Australia, David Brand, following a documentary film entitled Montage of Perth. Its first night programming included the film Guys and Dolls, an MGM-produced tribute to Cecil B. DeMille called The World's Greatest Showman and a replay of TV Spells Magic, a variety show produced for the opening of TEN-10 in Sydney the preceding April.

Upon launch, both STW and rival station TVW-7 launched a joint company entitled TV Facilities to allow the two commercial channels in Perth to share access to networked programs from the east coast.

=== 1970s and 1980s ===
Among the station's key achievements, it produced a major drama series in 1973 – The Drifter, starring Alan Cassell. In the run up to the launch of colour broadcasting, STW produced the first full colour TV news bulletin in November 1974. The station won its first Logie Award in 1971 for locally produced variety show Spotlight.

STW remained independently owned until 1978, when it became affiliated with the Nine Network, allowing direct access to its programming. In 1984, the station was bought by businessman Alan Bond for just under $50 million, becoming part of Bond Media. It became a network owned and operated station when Bond purchased the Nine Network from Kerry Packer.

On 17 April 1984, STW9 became the first station in Perth to commence 24-hour broadcasting. The station also claimed the first hour-long news program in the city, beating TVW, and mirroring Ten's in SA and eastern Australia (Ten did not have a station in the city until NEW-10 launched in 1988).

In 1989, Bond Media sold STW to Sunraysia Television for A$95 million. The deal also involved Bond Media purchasing the Sunraysia owned STV-8 for A$18 million. Bond Media was forced to sell due to the Federal cross-media ownership laws, which restricted the level of national reach for media owners.

=== 2000s ===
STW commenced digital television transmission in January 2001, broadcasting on VHF Channel 8 while maintaining analogue transmission on VHF Channel 9. In January 2007, Sunraysia Television posted a profit warning, from an expected 12% drop in revenue over the previous six months, citing a weak local advertising market and low ratings, despite a strong state economy. The profit warning led to speculation of a potential takeover of STW-9, with PBL and regional network WIN Television indicated as potential bidders. PBL Media announced in February 2007 that it would purchase STW-9 for A$136.4 million, with the deal to be completed in late March or early April subject to shareholder approval. However, major long-term shareholder, WIN, was also interested in the station. In June 2007, shareholders approved a revised bid from WIN.

=== 2010s ===
On 1 May 2012, STW launched Gold, a datacasting channel owned by WIN.

In 2013, Nine Entertainment purchased the station from WIN. With control from 30 September, the station returned once again as an owned-and-operated station, although Nine Network now owned all five of its flagship metropolitan stations.

On 19 September 2016, STW began broadcasting from new studios located at 253–267 St Georges Terrace in Perth's CBD, after 51 years at its original location in Dianella.

=== 2020s ===
On 12 June 2025, STW-9 in Perth celebrated its 60th anniversary.

== Programming ==
=== News and current affairs ===
9News national services broadcast on STW include Today, Weekend Today, Today Early News, 9News Morning, 9News Afternoon, A Current Affair and 60 Minutes.

Since May 2020, Nine News Late has been broadcast from STW on Mondays – Thursdays, presented by Michael Thomson.

==== 9News Perth ====
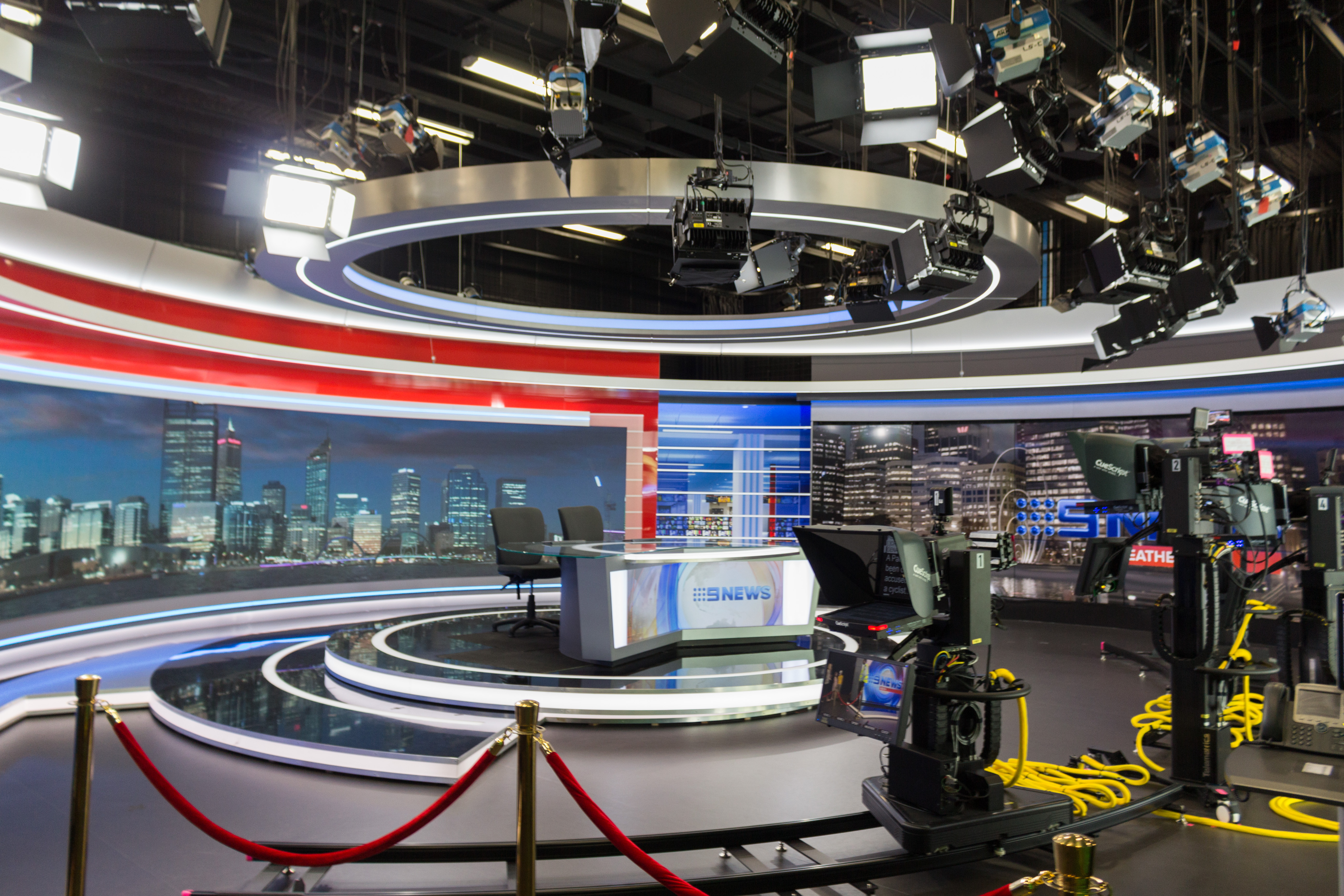
The set of 9News.

9News Perth is produced and broadcast live from STW's studios in Perth. 9News Afternoon is presented by Monika Kos and the flagship newscast every night at 6pm by Michael Thomson on weeknights and Tracy Vo on weekends, with sport presenters Paddy Sweeney (weeknights) and Alicia Molik (weekends) and weather presenters Natalia Cooper (weeknights) from across Perth and regional Western Australia.

Natalia Cooper is the main fill-in presenter for Michael Thomson on weeknights while Natalia Cooper is the main fill-in presenter for Tracy Vo on weekends.

Despite the national dominance of 9News for many years, the Perth bulletin has failed to match the ratings success seen in Sydney, Melbourne and Brisbane, and remains the lowest-rating news program in its market, often trailing rival Seven News Perth by over 100,000 viewers. This is reflected in the frequent position changes that have taken place at STW over the past thirty years since it last won the local ratings in 1990.

===== Presenters =====
Weeknights

- Michael Thomson (News)
- Paddy Sweeney (Sport)
- Natalia Cooper (Weather)

Weekends

- Tracy Vo (News)
- Alicia Molik (Sport)

9News Afternoon

- Monika Kos

Late News

- Tracy Vo

Reporters

- Jamie Freestone
- Michael Stamp
- Louise Rennie
- Connor McGoverne
- Kelly Williams
- Rachael Clifford
- Ezra Holt
- Brittany Hoskins
- Emma Griffiths
- Sarah Smith
- Amber Wilkinson
- Kelly Haywood
- Bianca Carbone
- Brooke Comerford
- Andrew Du
- Bonnie Raynor (sports reporter)
- Erin Harwood (sports reporter)

=== Local programming ===
In recent years, STW-9 has also produced and broadcast local news, current affairs & feature programming including a Western Australia edition of A Current Affair, a localised 4.30pm afternoon news bulletin, gardening series Garden Gurus (which continues to air on Nine Network stations), lifestyle series Just Add Water and travel series Postcards WA.

== Appealathon ==
Appealathon was STW's fundraising organisation. It can be considered a counterpart to TVW's Telethon, and during the 1970s and 80s broadcast its own 24-hour telethon.

Since its founding in 1975, Channel Nine Perth's Appealathon has raised in excess of $53.5 million for charity. Appealathon has supported four specific charities with Appealathon funds: the Activ Foundation, Civilian Maimed & Limbless Association, Paraplegic/Quadriplegic Association and Rocky Bay. Many other organisations are helped as well on a yearly basis. Appealathon was involved in over 50 fundraising events and projects across Perth each year, including the City to Surf and the Rottnest Channel Swim.

In 2009, administration of the organisation was handed over to Variety WA.

== Broadcasting details ==
Locations of transmitters broadcasting STW

Analogue main channel frequency (to 25 June 2013): VHF-9 @ 196.25 MHz (bandwidth: 7 MHz PAL)
Digital transport stream frequency (as of 25 June 2013): VHF-8 @ 191.5 MHz (bandwidth: 7 MHz 64-QAM

Digital channels
LCN	Service	Image quality	Compression quality
9	9	720x576i 16:9 SD	H.262 video @ 5550 kbit/s Dolby Digital audio @ 256 kbit/s MPEG-1 Audio Layer II @ 256 kbit/s
90	9HD	1440x1080i HD Lite	H.262 video @ 15250 kbit/s video Dolby Digital audio @ 448 kbit
92	9Gem	720x576i 16:9 SD	H.262 video @ 5550 kbit/s Dolby Digital audio @ 256 kbit/s MPEG-1 Audio Layer II @ 256 kbit/s
93/99	9Go!	720x576i 16:9 SD	H.262 video MPEG-1 Audio Layer II @ 256 kbit/s
94	9Life	720x576i 16:9 SD	H.262 video MPEG-1 Audio Layer II @ 256 kbit/s
95	9Gem HD	1440x1080i HD Lite	H.262 video Dolby Digital audio @ 256 kbit/s MPEG-1 Audio Layer II @ 256 kbit/s
96	9Rush	720x576i 16:9 SD	H.262 video MPEG-1 Audio Layer II @ 256 kbit/s
97	extra	720x576i 16:9 SD	H.262 video MPEG-1 Audio Layer II @ 256 kbit/s
