= Antony Carr (novelist) =

English author

Antony Carr (1916-1995) was an English author who published five crime novels, including A Comedy of Terrors (1955), Candles of the Night (1956) and The Man in Room 3 (1958). He was the son of the singer Robert Carr and uncle of Australian newsreader Susannah Carr.

In A Comedy of Terrors, the hero and narrator takes on a commission to find two Spanish dancers last seen in Paris early in World War II. One reviewer considered it "a nicely developed spy plot, .. a most entertaining book", while another wrote that, "By a process of elimination, the murderer will be identified by some readers, but this will not detract from the tension of the final climax, or the growing interest in the people in the case." Philip John Stead, reviewing Candles of the Night in the Times Literary Supplement, described it as "begin[ning] with a situation that is bizarre in the Chestertonian manner: a dinner-party at which the guests do not know their host and at which he does not even appear. ... cleverly put together and it has some atmospheric quality with its dim hotel and drab antique shop, but the author has let cleverness run riot at the expense of probability." Vernon Fane, reviewing it in The Sphere, thought it had "a sound plot and a reasonable, yet surprising solution", though it contained too much dialogue to maintain the tension. Francis Iles described The Man in Room 3 as "an old-fashioned melodrama .. with missing heirs and blind men who can see"; another reviewer wrote that it was "to be read with particular pleasure."
