= Channel Seven Perth Telethon =

Annual telethon held in Perth, Western Australia

- Channel Seven Perth Telethon logo
- Also known as: Telethon
- Created by: James Cruthers; Brian Treasure
- Directed by: Steve Quartly (1981–present)
- Presented by: Ryan Daniels (2024–present); Charlotte Goodlet (2024); Basil Zempilas (2010–2023); Jeff Newman (1968–2009)
- Country of origin: Australia
- Original language: English

Production
- Production locations: TVW Studios Dianella (1968–2003); Perth Convention & Exhibition Centre (2004–2019); Crown Perth (2020–2021); Perth Stadium (2021); RAC Arena (2022–present)
- Camera setup: Multi-camera
- Running time: 26 hours
- Production company: TVW

Original release
- Network: Seven Network
- Release: 1968 – present

The Channel Seven Perth Telethon, regionally known simply as Telethon, is an annual telethon established in 1968 by philanthropist Sir James Cruthers and Brian Treasure, and produced by TVW, a Seven Network-owned television station in Perth, Western Australia. It raises money for over 150 beneficiaries each year, including the Perth Children's Hospital, the Telethon Clinical Research Centre and the Telethon Kids Institute. Channel Seven's Perth Telethon is the highest donating telethon per capita in the world, and since the first Telethon in 1968 has raised over A$850 million in total.

The Channel 7 Telethon Trust is the charitable trust behind the event and its related fundraising activities. The philosophy behind the Channel 7 Telethon Trust is to financially support the medical and social welfare of children and young people and to fund research into children's diseases.

Presenters for Telethon have included:

- Ryan Daniels (2024–present)
- Charlotte Goodlet (2024)
- Basil Zempilas (2010–2023)
- Jeff Newman (1968–2009)

== Overview ==
The Telethon broadcast usually runs around 26 hours non-stop, starting from 7.00pm on a Saturday night in October, broadcasting live across Western Australia on the Seven Network throughout the metropolitan area of Perth and across the rest of Western Australia; the broadcast was also carried by Seven-affiliate GWN7 in regional Western Australia before the network's dissolution in 2022. In more recent years, parts of the event have also been broadcast nationally on 7flix and streamed in full on 7plus.

As of 2022 Telethon is held at RAC Arena; the event was originally held at TVW's former studios at Dianella, from 2005 to 2019 it was held at the Perth Convention & Exhibition Centre, and in 2020 and 2021 the opening and closing portions of the broadcast were held at the Crown Theatre at Crown Perth. The event aims to raise money for its beneficiaries from donations from private citizens, organisations, businesses and corporations, as well as from special fundraising events held throughout the year and the public auction of up to two specially built Telethon homes, with one in the metropolitan area of Perth and one in a regional area of Western Australia.

Since its inception in 1968, one or more children currently undergoing treatment at Perth Children's Hospital (and before 2018, Princess Margaret Hospital for Children), or who are supported by Telethon beneficiaries are chosen by Telethon to represent all the children who benefit from the money raised during that year's event. Although one child has been traditionally chosen to be that year's representative, since 2008 two children, one from the metropolitan area and one from a regional area, have been chosen each year, and on occasion more than two children have been featured on Telethon. Since 2010 these children have been referred to as the "Little Telethon Stars", and their stories are highlighted in the lead up to and during the event. The first "Little Telethon Star" was Maryanne Lazerides, who was the youngest person to have open heart surgery at just 11 months old. Two former "Little Telethon Stars", Louise Sauvage and Ben Popham, have gone on to become gold medal-winning Paralympians.

Talent from Seven Network shows such as Home & Away and Sunrise make the journey to the west coast of Australia for the weekend to entertain the audience, visit unwell children at Perth Children's Hospital, take phone calls, and generally participate in the 26-hour marathon broadcast. In addition, Telethon has hosted a number of high-profile international guests including Michael Jackson, Phyllis Diller, Carrie Fisher, and the Harlem Globetrotters. A number of Australian guests, such as Hugh Jackman, Chris Hemsworth, Samara Weaving, Ryan Kwanten and Troye Sivan, have also appeared on Telethon before achieving international fame themselves. Musical guests are also an integral part of the weekend's entertainment; over the years, notable international performers during Telethon have included Sir Cliff Richard, Harry Connick Jr., Whitney Houston, Stevie Wonder, Tina Turner, Julian Lennon, Sammy Davis Jr., Petula Clark and Céline Dion. In more recent years, finalists from talent shows such as Australian Idol, The X Factor, The Voice and Australia's Got Talent have also made appearances during the event, joining lower profile and local acts.

Costumed character Fat Cat from the former children's television show Fat Cat and Friends serves as the mascot for Telethon. Longtime TVW7 weather presenter Jeff Newman hosted the event for 32 years before retiring in 2009. He was replaced by Basil Zempilas, who served as the anchoring host of the broadcast from 2010 until he stepped down after 2023 due to his political career. After co-hosting the event in 2024 with Charlotte Goodlet, Ryan Daniels became sole host in 2025.

A number of figures related to Telethon have been honoured within the Australian Honours - the Medal of the Order of Australia (OAM). In 1994 Jeff Newman OAM was awarded for services to charity and fundraising through his work with Telethon and the Variety Club of Western Australia. In 2019 Glenn Christie OAM was awarded for his service to the community through support for charitable initiatives, including 3 decades of volunteering to Telethon. Mr Christie was also responsible for the lobbing of the naming of Telethon Avenue in Perth. Former "Little Telethon Star" Ben Popham OAM was awarded for his services to sport in 2022. In 1998 Stuart Wagstaff was appointed a Member of the Order of Australia (AM) for service to the community, particularly through Telethon by raising funds for charities that support children's medical research. In the 2025 King's Birthday Honours Mr Scott Guerini OAM was also awarded the Medal of the Order of Australia through his Scott's Great Walk and other fundraising efforts in support of Telethon.

== History ==
Telethon 2006 closing celebration at the Perth Convention & Exhibition Centre

TVW previously broadcast one-off telethons for bushfire relief in 1961, and to raise funds for Christmas care packages sent to Western Australian soldiers serving in Vietnam in 1966 and 1967.

Telethon began in 1968 when the Telethon Trust was established by senior executives Sir James Cruthers and Brian Treasure at Channel 7 Perth. It was inspired by the success of the first MDA Labor Day Telethon hosted by Jerry Lewis in the United States in 1966, and the Good Friday Appeal in Melbourne. Cruthers first brought up the idea with then-CEO of Princess Margaret Hospital, James Clarkson during a round of golf at Lake Karrinyup Country Club, who suggested that the focus should be on facilitating medical research.

Although all of the station staff agreed to volunteer their time to host the event, the first Perth Telethon has been described as chaotic: the station was open to the public for the first time resulting in hours-long queues of people wanting to get in, there were no computers so pledges and receipts were written out by hand, and anyone who pledged more than $2,000 ($25,377 in 2020) received a follow-up phone call to ensure it was not a hoax. The event was also inadvertently underbooked of talent, with one musical act persuaded to stay on from 2:30am until 6am when the next act would arrive. The general public, especially children, were encouraged to collect 5c pieces in a special card with indents to hold the coins. When the card was complete ($1 value) the children could drop them in at the TV studios and meet presenter Trina Brown. The event raised more than anticipated, netting $104,829 ($1,330,125 in 2020) in donations.

The first Telethon also featured an infamous segment where guests Stuart Wagstaff, Johnny O'Keefe, Bobby Limb and Graham Kennedy, who were shirtless at the time as part of a dare, had to scramble to find their clothing before then-Premier of Western Australia David Brand made an appearance at the station. Wagstaff would become closely associated with Telethon, with the entertainer returning for 35 subsequent Telethons, making his last appearance via video in 2009.

Due to the ongoing success of the event, during the 1970s and 1980s, TVW's rival station, the Nine Network's STW also broadcast its own telethon, known as Appealathon.

Michael Jackson appeared on the October 1985 Telethon as part of a deal with Western Australian millionaire Robert Holmes à Court (who owned the television station at the time) to acquire ATV Music Publishing. Jackson could not perform due to contractual reasons, but he spoke briefly and met the two "Little Telethon Stars".

2007 marked 40 years since Telethon began in Western Australia and raised more than $6.5 million. This was more than double the previous record amount of $3 million. Telethon 2008 raised a further $7.5 million, with the Australian Federal Government contributing $1.5 million, and a lottery winner donating $1 million of her winnings to the cause. The 2008 event also featured an Australian rules football match between former West Coast Eagles players and former Fremantle Dockers players in tribute to Chris Mainwaring, a former West Coast Eagles player and Seven News sports presenter who had died the previous year. The match continued to be held until 2012.

In 2010, Telethon broke its record set in 2008, raising $9,237,539. This figure was later revised to $10 million as the phones kept ringing after the Telethon finished. In addition, 2010 marked the year in which the total amount collected over the previous 43 years surpassed the $100 million milestone. This Telethon was touted by Seven Network owner Kerry Stokes as being "the best Telethon ever". In 2011, Telethon once again broke the previous record by raising $13,473,159. In 2012, Telethon broke several records, with the metropolitan Telethon Home selling for a record $1.2 million at the auction. In addition, the final total broke the $15 million milestone, raising a record $16,805,622. The telecast featured a live performance via video from Elton John who was performing at the gala opening of Perth Arena. In 2013, Telethon again broke the record, raising $20.7 million. The records continued to be broken in 2014, with a total of $25,271,542, due partly to a $20m five-year commitment by BHP.

In 2015, $25.8 million was raised by the event. That same year also saw Telethon Avenue, a street in the Kings Square precinct of the Perth City Link project, named in recognition of the organisation. The name was initially rejected by the WA's Landgate Geographic Names Committee, with then Premier Colin Barnett believing it was "inappropriate" to name a street after a commercial organisation; however the decision was reversed following extensive lobbying by prominent local volunteer Glenn Christie OAM and the intervention of then Foreign Minister Julie Bishop. The event in 2016 saw $26,290,154 as the final total, which took Telethon's total raised over 49 years to $231,886,120.

In Telethon's 50th year in 2017, it raised $10 million more than its previous record amount, amounting to a total of $36,431,381. In 2018, Telethon raised more than $38 million after a $2 million donation on behalf of Seven West Media at the last minute, which also saw the $300 million mark of total donations be broken.

In 2020, challenges and restrictions imposed by the COVID-19 pandemic saw several changes to the annual Telethon broadcast. Most notably, the event replaced its traditional 26-hour live marathon broadcast with two, 3-hour live primetime specials broadcast from the Crown Theatre at Crown Perth on the evenings of 24 and 25 October 2020. Due to ongoing border restrictions, the 2020 broadcast also focused more on WA-based performers and personalities, though celebrities from the eastern states and overseas, and those from Seven's shows still featured during the event via pre-recorded segments. 2020 also saw the first Telethon Family Festival held at Perth Stadium on 25 October 2020. The fundraising event was promoted as an opportunity for families to come together following the easing of pandemic restrictions and the cancellation of the 2020 Perth Royal Show earlier in the year. Despite the new, much shorter format, the challenges faced by the event, and the uncertain economic climate, Telethon set a new record of $46,331,097 raised in 2020.

For 2021, Telethon returned to its traditional 26-hour continuous broadcast format, with live broadcasts from the Crown Theatre and at the call centre at Crown Perth, and from the Telethon Family Festival at Perth Stadium; however, due to ongoing border restrictions, the event again showcased mainly WA-based entertainers and talent. Telethon 2021 set a new record of $62,115,467 raised, surpassing the $50 million mark in annual donations for the first time as well as the $400 million mark in total donations, with the state government of Western Australia donating $10 million and the Federal Government of Australia contributing $5 million.

In 2022 Telethon was broadcast from RAC Arena for the first time. The venue and a section of Wellington Street also hosted the Telethon Family Festival. The following year saw the festival expand into Forrest Place and Yagan Square. The 2022 event raised a record $71,356,721 for Telethon, and saw the milestone of $500 million in total donations passed. Telethon 2023 set a new record of $77,467,775 raised, with the state government contributing $12 million. The 2023 broadcast also saw the milestone of $600 million raised in Telethon's totality.

Telethon 2024 set another record of $83,264,216 raised, with the state government contributing $13 million. The 2024 Telethon broadcast reached a milestone of $650 million raised in total. The 2025 Telethon broadcast reached a milestone of $750 million raised in total since inception, and set another record for donations with $90,160,275.

In 2026 Telethon broke the $100 million barrier, raising $101,277,705.

== Annual summaries ==
Year	Funds Raised (AUD)	Telethon Home Auction (AUD)		Little Telethon Stars	Notable Guests
Year	Funds Raised (AUD)	Metropolitan	Regional	Little Telethon Stars	Notable Guests
1968	$104,829	—	—	Maryanne Lazerides	Stuart Wagstaff, Graham Kennedy, Johnny O'Keefe
1969	$147,000	—	—	—	
1970	$166,000	—	—	—	
1971	$177,587	—	—	Beth Crispin	
1972	$210,792	$17,500	—	Amanda Rose	
1973	$335,503	$24,750	—	Lisa Tucker & Karen Green	
1974	$530,710	—	—		The cast of Number 96
1975	$586,700	$9,350	—	Gavin O'Farrell	
1976	$721,624	—	—	Louise Sauvage	
1977	$905,000	—	—	—	
1978	$887,376	—	—	—	
1979	$909,327	—	—	Blanche Mathiot	
1980	$1,071,503	—	—	—	
1981	$1,338,002	—	—	Brooke Arbery (she died in 2019)	
1982	$1,601,387	—	—	Cassandra Hughes	Julie Anthony
1983	$1,711,456	$97,000	—	Tara Dalla Costa	Sammy Davis, Jr., Jackie Trent, Tony Hatch, Normie Rowe
1984	$2,143,000	$120,000	—	Peta Mears	Cliff Richard, Gene Pitney
1985	$2,818,837	$132,000	—	Helen Francis & Luke Smith	Michael Jackson, Jack Klugman
1986	$3,604,717	—	—	Amy Howell	Petula Clark, Dame Edna Everage, Lewis Collins
1987	$3,510,000	$170,000	—	Matthew Webb, Melanie Hawks, Prudence Hawkins, Leigh Beardsley, Danny Desivieri & Samantha Williams	Stevie Wonder
1988	$3,253,077	$225,000	—	Lisa Cutter	Whitney Houston
1989	$3,253,077	$217,000	—	Holly Clarke	John Farnham, Dannii Minogue
1990	$3,204,657	$270,000	—	Matthew Gare	
1991	$2,703,957	$262,000	—	—	Cliff Richard, Bert Newton
1992	$2,710,438	$280,000	—	—	Celine Dion
1993	$2,004,905	$295,000	—	Edward Thompson & Amy Munro	
1994	$2,264,770	$238,000	—	Ashley Harris	
1995	$2,000,055	$127,500	—	—	
1996	$2,005,470	$278,000	—	Gillian Bowater, Cassandra Domjahn, Lisa Nicholas, Kyle Rogers & Jonathon Williams	
1997	$2,305,747	$330,000	—	Darren Woonings, Jordan Matthews & Georgia Lowry	Hugh Jackman
1998	$2,465,750	$330,001	—	Tamara Brereton	Julian Lennon
1999	$2,507,545	$335,021	—	Thomas Clarke	Harry Connick, Jr.
2000	$2,395,947	$330,000	—	Holly Kneale & Chloe Kneale	Phyllis Diller
2001	$2,587,137	$420,000	—	David Naso	
2002	$2,602,397	$505,000	$450,000	Natasha Haederle	
2003	$2,614,456	$480,323	$450,000	Annie Shreeve	Christine Anu, Jimmy Barnes
2004	$2,867,467	$620,000	$630,000	Tayla Divitini	Jimmy Barnes, Kate Ceberano, Chris Hemsworth
2005	$3,017,000	$608,000	$601,000	Nicholas Travia & Tahnee Hardy	Kasey Chambers, Alex Lloyd
2006	$3,217,437	$739,000	$725,000	Teagan Bryam	Guy Sebastian
2007	$6,527,576	$620,000	$500,000	Bridgette Gilmour	Darren Hayes, Damien Leith, Anthony Callea, Young Divas, Chris Vance
2008	$7,535,678	$830,000	$600,000	Taylor Tasseff & Claire Davies (Claire died two months later)	Damien Leith, Vanessa Amorosi, Troye Sivan
2009	$6,374,775	$862,000	$600,000	Wade Clare & Trent Wailu	Jimmy Barnes, Jessica Mauboy, Guy Sebastian, Ian Moss
2010	$9,237,539	$865,000	$600,000	Phoebe McIndoe & Lachy Ross	Carrie Fisher, Booboo Stewart, Kate Ceberano, Jessica Mauboy
2011	$13,473,159	$560,000	$460,000	Savanna Addis & Ben Popham (Savanna died in 2018 and a tribute was played during the 2018 broadcast)	Def Leppard, The Ten Tenors, Booboo Stewart, Potbelleez, Jon Stevens
2012	$16,805,622	$1,200,000	$620,000	Sophie Read & Conor Brown	Elton John, Justice Crew, Daryl Braithwaite, Evermore, Adam Brand
2013	$20,701,272	$760,000	—	Tahlia Polmear & Jack Day	Tina Arena, Samantha Jade, Johnny Ruffo, The Harlem Globetrotters
2014	$25,271,542	$700,000	$625,000	Patrick Majewski & Emily Prior	James Reyne, Justice Crew, The Collective
2015	$25,854,524	$707,500	$580,000	Alyssa Bolger & Jayton Carter	Samantha Jade, Daryl Braithwaite, Nathaniel Willemse, Reigan Derry, Pseudo Echo, Dennis Locorriere
2016	$26,695,154	$750,000	$600,000	Cody Colmer & Hailey Ardagh	Jessica Mauboy, Marcia Hines, Anthony Callea, The Black Sorrows
2017	$35,431,381	$650,000	$900,000	Maddox Ball & Olivia Riley	Dami Im, Pseudo Echo, Leo Sayer, Daryl Braithwaite, Pete Murray
2018	$38,000,554	$750,000	$344,908	Kaide Stratton & Charlotte Meredith	Leo Sayer, Lady Kitty Spencer
2019	$42,596,034	$655,000	—	Callum Berrisford & Eva Molloy	Guy Sebastian, Ricki-Lee Coulter, Joel Jackson, Gina Jeffreys
2020	$46,331,097	—	—	Eamon Doak & Nora Holly	Casey Donovan, Samantha Jade, Ian Kenny, Kate Walsh, Katherine Langford, Ben Elton
2021	$62,115,467	—	—	Lucy Antipas & Oliver Lim	Birds of Tokyo, End of Fashion, Gina Williams, San Cisco, The Ten Tenors, Rove McManus
2022	$71,356,721	$760,000	—	Leo Beazley, Ari Phillips & Emily Siew	Ricki-Lee Coulter, Ella Hooper, Phil Burton, Hoodoo Gurus
2023	$77,467,775	$1,000,000	—	Connor Barrett, Harrison Carthew, Emily Houston & Sophia Marshall	Marcia Hines, Russell Morris, Rhonda Burchmore, Emma Memma, Jimmy Barnes, Ant Middleton
2024	$83,264,216	$1,175,000	—	Nazeem Fahmi, Nate Fearnall, Charlee Hosking & Florence Shanks	Guy Sebastian, Samantha Jade, Vanessa Amorosi, Human Nature
2025	$90,160,275	$1,375,000	—	Jordan Blair, Paige McIllree, Izzy Miller & Xavier Summers	Ronan Keating, Emma Memma, Shannon Noll, Casey Donovan, Dami Im, Rob Mills
2026	$101,277,705	$1,305,000	—	Paige McKay, Aiden Narsico & Olivia Street	Jessica Mauboy, Morgan Evans, Rogue Traders, Kate Miller-Heidke, AJ Styles, Natalya Neidhart, Emma Memma
2027	$TBA	$TBA	—	TBA	TBA
