= The Drifter (TV series) =

- Written by: David Whittaker
- Directed by: Brian Green
- Starring: Alan Cassell; Sydney Davis
- Country of origin: Australia
- Original language: English
- No. of episodes: 22

Production
- Producer: David Aspinall
- Camera setup: Tony Graham, Ian Jobsz, Brett Wiley
- Running time: 30 mins

Original release
- Network: STW
- Release: 1973

The Drifter is a 1973 Australian TV series shot in Western Australia.

The Drifter was a weekly half-hour drama, produced in-house by Swan Television (STW-9), in Perth.

== Synopsis ==
A used car salesman finds his life falling apart, when his wife and kids are killed in a house fire. He drifts aimlessly, before being hired by a lawyer as a private investigator.

== Cast ==
- Alan Cassell as James Halloran
- Sydney Davis as Owen Nicholas
- Helen Naeme as Lucie
- Valda Diamond as Miss Ziegler
- Jenny McNae as Lynn Canfield
- Adele Cohen as Faith Royal
- Max Bartlett as Len
- David Lyon as Barry
- Olwyn Summers as Judith
