= The Olive Tree (1975 film) =

- Written by: Elizabeth Backhouse
- Directed by: Edgar Metcalfe
- Country of origin: Australia
- Original language: English

Production
- Producers: Elizabeth Backhouse; David Morre
- Cinematography: Wally Fairweather
- Editor: David Moore
- Running time: 70 minutes
- Production company: Film Centre Productions

Original release
- Release: 1975

The Olive Tree is a 1975 Australian TV film starring Alan Cassell and directed by Edgar Metcalfe. It was shot in Western Australia.

The film was given a theatrical release in Melbourne in 1980.

== Premise ==
A struggle ensues over the inheritance of a family property.

== Cast ==
- John Adam
- Alan Cassell
- Faith Clayton
- Robert van Mackelenberg as Nico
