= Rick Ardon =

Australian television news reader

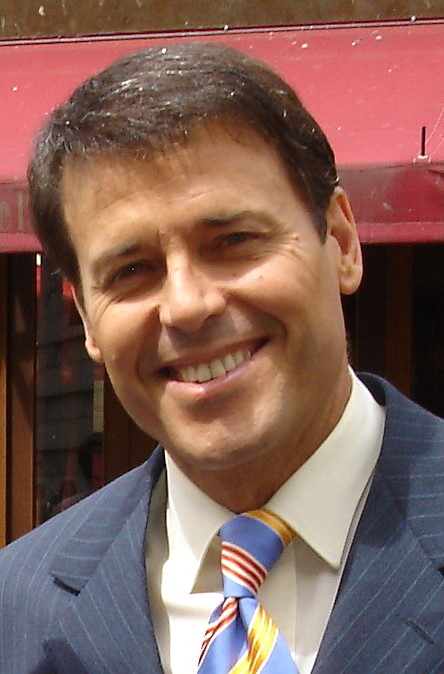
- Born: 4 March 1959 (age 67); Perth, Western Australia
- Occupation: Seven News newsreader
- Spouse: Erin Ardon

Rick Ardon (born 4 March 1959) is an Australian television news presenter. Since 1985, Ardon has co-presented Seven News in Perth with Susannah Carr. The pair are recognised by Guinness World Records as the world's longest-serving TV news anchor duo, having been on the air together for 40 years.

== Education ==
Ardon commenced primary school at the Sacred Heart Primary School, Highgate, in 1965 and transferred in 1969 to Christian Brothers High School, Highgate, where he completed his primary and secondary schooling, leaving in 1976.

== Media career ==
Ardon began his media career at the State's daily paper, The West Australian, where he was Cadet Journalist of the Year in 1977. In 1978 he made the move to electronic broadcasting, joining television station TVW-7 as a news journalist. By the end of the year he was also acting as relief newsreader and was rapidly promoted from the minor weekend bulletins to a regular weeknight news presenter role with Susannah Carr in 1985. Under their guard, the Seven Nightly News rose to the top of the ratings in Perth, where it remains as of today.

In January 2026, it was announced that Ardon and Susannah Carr would transition to presenting Seven News Perth from Thursday to Saturday, with Tim McMillan and Angela Tsun presenting from Sunday to Wednesday.

His time as a journalist at the Seven Network has seen him cover a number of significant stories, from the Gulf War of 1990–91 to the Bali Bombings of 2005 and the subsequent Amrozi bin Nurhasyim trial.

Other overseas assignments include the Monaco Grand Prix and the Cannes Film Festival. During the Sydney Olympics in 2000 Ardon presented the news to Western Australians from the Olympic Stadium. His on-screen work has been rewarded with 10 Logie Awards as Western Australia's Most Popular TV Personality. In addition to his news-presenting role he has also written/produced three documentaries for the station.

== Achievements ==
- Lives in the Balance – The story of 114 whales stranded off the WA Coast.
- Riviera Rich and Raunchy – A look into the life of those on the French Riviera.
- A documentary which he himself filmed on the Pacific.
- Led a question-and-answer session with the Dalai Lama at the Perth Arena in June 2015.

== Business interests ==
In 2002, Rick Ardon's wife, Erin Ardon, received approval from the City of Stirling to operate a bed and breakfast. The bed and breakfast subsequently closed in 2014.

== See also ==
- TVW-7 (Seven Perth)
- Seven News
