= Falcon Island (TV series) =

- Created by: Joan Ambrose
- Written by: Joan Ambrose
- Directed by: Peter Maxwell; David Rapsey
- Starring: Alan Cassell; Bevan Lee
- Composer: Greg Schultz
- Country of origin: Australia
- Original language: English
- No. of seasons: 1
- No. of episodes: 26

Production
- Executive producer: Paul Barron
- Producers: Judith West; Paul Barron
- Cinematography: Kevan Lind
- Editors: Geoff Hall; Kerstine Hill
- Production companies: Excalibur Nominees; Australian Children's Television Foundation

Original release
- Network: National Nine Network
- Release: 20 February 1981

Falcon Island is a 1981 Australian children's television series set in Western Australia which screened on the Nine Network. The series also aired in the United Kingdom on the ITV network in 1984, and was repeated on Channel 4 in 1986.

== Plot ==
Paul, Jock and Kate are three children who try to protect the wreck of a Dutch galleon, the Golden Falcon, against smugglers and sandminers.

== Cast ==
- Alan Cassell as Jack Brady
- Bill Kerr as Madden
- Francesca Shoesmith as Kate Ellery
- Greg Duffy as Paul Ellery
- Justin Hollyock as Jock Dixon
- Bevan Lee as Vim Van Dorn
- Maurie Ogden as Frank Ellery
- Michael Loney as Constable Harris
- Joan Sydney as Mrs. Yates
- Merrin Canning as Vicky Fitzgerald
- Barrie Barkla as Jarvis
- Ian Fletcher as Alan
