= Robert Carr (baritone) =

British opera singer

Robert Carr (12 April 1881 – 20 November 1948) was an English baritone singer and prolific recording artist. Born in London, he studied at the Guildhall School of Music and Drama under Bantock Pierrepoint. He recorded under his own name and as variously Richard Condor, William Duncan, Harry Durrant, Robert Durrant, Ernest Gray, Bobby Gray, Robert Oswald, and perhaps some others. His recording repertoire was varied ranging from popular songs of the day, sentimental songs, hymns and sacred songs, British patriotic songs (particularly during the First World War) as well as Classical music, most notably a complete recording of Gounod's Faust in 1929 under Sir Thomas Beecham under the Columbia label. He also took part in recordings of several Gilbert and Sullivan operettas as well as Edward German's Merrie England under the direction of Joe Batten. Shortly after the Titanic disaster in 1912 he recorded two songs (on both sides of the same record), "Stand by your Post" and "Be British" in memory of the victims. The proceeds from the record's sales went towards helping the victims' families. This was one of the earliest examples of producing recordings to raise funds for charitable causes and it is one that has been continued in subsequent years, most notably with Live Aid in the 1980s and Bob Geldof's record Feed the World to raise money for victims of the Ethiopia Famine in 1984. This was the continuation of a tradition that had its origins with Robert Carr's Titanic record. During the First World War (where he served in the British Army) he recorded a number of songs as part of the recruiting effort and to bolster morale, most notably "We Must All Fall In" and "Laddie in Khaki", composed by Ivor Novello.

In addition to being a recording, concert and opera singer, Robert Carr was also a leading figure with concert parties which provided light entertainment at British holiday resorts in the years before the Second World War. He owned one such party called the Georgians.

During the Second World War, Robert Carr worked for ENSA, an organisation which provided entertainment for British servicemen serving in the war. After the war, he also taught singing at his old music college, the Guildhall School of Music and Drama.

He died in Essex, England on 20 November 1948. The detective novelist Antony Carr was his son and Australian newsreader Susannah Carr his granddaughter.

== Recordings ==
Recordings include:

- Gounod: Faust Harold Williams (baritone), Robert Carr (baritone), Robert Easton (bass), Muriel Brunskill (contralto) Clarence Raybould (conductor) Dutton Laboratories
- So Near The Kingdom (Sacred) Robert Carr - Ethel Toms Contralto, Baritone Duet - Orch. Acc. Gennett 9080-B
- Beautiful Birds, Sing On J. Howe / Robert Carr Baritone—Orch. Acc. Gennett 9082-A
- What Will You Do With Jesus Ethel Toms & Robert Carr Contralto, Baritone Duet with Orch. Acc. Gennett 9092-A
- Hold Thou My Hand Robert Carr Baritone with Orch. Acc. Gennett 9092-B
- The Rosary Nevin / Robert Carr Baritone with Orch. Acc. Gennett 4669-A
- Hiding In Thee Robert Carr Baritone Gennett 4674-B
- The songs my Mother sang Winner 2404
- All aboard for the bye-bye land Winner 2315
- Turn On, Old Time Cameron, Wilfrid Virgo & Robert Carr, Trio Winner 2349
- I am the King of Spain Wilfrid Virgo & Robert Carr, Duet
- Come sing to me Winner 2111
- Stand by your Post Be British Winner 2144 (the "Titanic" record)
- We were Sweethearts Winner 2247
