= Edgar Metcalfe =

English born Australian actor, director and writer (1933–2012)

Edgar Metcalfe AM
- Born: 18 September 1933; Blackpool, Lancashire, England
- Died: 13 September 2012 (aged 78); Menora, Western Australia
- Occupations: Actor, director, author
- Years active: 1951–2012

Edgar Metcalfe, AM (18 September 1933 – 13 September 2012) was an English-born actor, director and author, who widely contributed to theatre in Perth, Western Australia.

== Personal life ==
Edgar Metcalfe was born in 1933 in Burnley, Lancashire, United Kingdom. Edgar's father died before he was born and his mother before he was one year old. His aunt and uncle adopted him and he went to live on a farm in Lancashire. When Metcalfe was 10, his adoptive parents moved to the seaside town of Blackpool, where he gained a scholarship to the Arnold House School, a local boys' grammar school.

In 2010, Metcalfe returned to Blackpool, intending to retire there, but he soon returned to Perth, finding himself somewhat disillusioned with the differences between what he remembered and what he found. He died in Perth, WA, on 13 September 2012.

== Career ==
=== Actor ===
On leaving school, rather than go to drama school, Metcalfe went straight into acting in the British provincial repertory theatre system, which saw him work in troupes of actors touring the country – a training ground that offered the young actor a variety of plays in which to develop his talents.

As an actor, Edgar Metcalfe has played many roles including Shakespearean roles as Iago, Macbeth, Puck, Prospero, Caliban and Claudius along with leading roles in "Private Lives", "Charley's Aunt", "The Caine Mutiny Court Martial", "Quartet" and "Fagin and Daddy Warbucks". He also has a history of playing pantomime dames.

In 2008, he portrayed the Queen Mother in Two Old Queens by John Senczuk at the Riverside Theatre in Parramatta

=== Director ===
In 1963 at the age of 29, after 12 years working in English repertory, Metcalfe moved to Perth, to take up the position of artistic director of the National Theatre Company of WA, at the Playhouse Theatre. He has been quoted as saying this was because he "thought the climate would be better for his asthma".

Whilst working as the artistic director for the National, Metcalfe coordinated a co-production of Who's Afraid of Virginia Woolf? between the National Theatre Inc. and the University of Western Australia at the Dolphin Theatre.

Subsequently, he was artistic director at The Hole in the Wall Theatre in Leederville (successfully guiding the company through a fiscally difficult time), associate director at the Melbourne Theatre Company and frequently worked with the Effie Crump Theatre in Northbridge. Whilst he was associate director at Melbourne Theatre Company, he won the Melbourne Critics' Award for his production of "The Devils" and "What the Butler Saw."

Metcalfe also directed four national tours in Australia: "Doctor in Love" and "Night Mother" with Jill Perryman and June Salter; and "The Nerd" and "Corpse" with the late Gordon Chater. In Canberra in 1988 he directed plays including dinner-theatre production of Charles Dyer's Rattle of a Simple Man.

=== Author ===
As an author, Metcalfe's writing includes six plays, a collection of short stories set in the Perth hills, and three books, the most recent being a novel based on his play Alleycat Alice and Friends.

== Recognition ==
Metcalfe was named WA Citizen of the Year in 1976 for service to the performing arts. He was appointed a Member of the Order of Australia in the 1978 Queen's Birthday Honours for his services to the performing arts. In 2004 he was awarded an Honours Citation during the centenary celebrations for His Majesty's Theatre. In 2011 the renovated IMAX theatre in Perth was named the Metcalfe Playhouse, to honour the long-time artistic director at the Playhouse Theatre who did so much to secure the professional theatre industry in Perth. At the time, Metcalfe said it was a great compliment: "I'm particularly pleased that it's called the Metcalfe Playhouse because, of course, the Playhouse is where I began my Western Australian career in 1963 ... a long time ago!"

== Death ==
Metcalfe died on 13 September 2012 in Menora, Western Australia. He was less than a week from his 79th birthday.

== Filmography ==
=== Actor ===
Year	Title	Role	Notes
1974	Percy's Progress	London Newsman	US Title: It's Not the Size That Counts
1975	Plugg	Claude Mashall-Enright	
1988	Dadah Is Death	Florid Businessman	Television Movie (based on the executions of Kevin Barlow and Brian Chambers)
1988	A Cry in the Dark	Dr. Brown	
1993	Ship to Shore	Senator Hogg	TV series – 1 episode – "Greed Rules, OK?"
1998	Minty	Roy the Director	TV series – 1 episode – "All the World's a Stage"
2004	Foreign Exchange	Old Man	TV series - 1 episode - "Granny Gambit"
2007	The Sleepover Club	Mr. Garcia	TV series – 1 episode – "Never Too Old"

=== Director ===
Year	Title	Notes
1975	The Olive Tree	Australian Film – starring John Adam and Alan Cassell

== Plays and novels ==
- Garden Party
- Vinegar and Brown Paper
- Homing Pigeon
- AlleyCat Alice and Friends
- A guy called Alice
- With Friends Like These...
