= Alan Cassell =

English Australian actor (1932–2017)

- Born: Alan Louis Cassell; 16 February 1932; Manchester, England
- Died: 30 August 2017 (aged 85); Kyneton, Victoria, Australia
- Occupation: Actor
- Children: 2

Alan Louis Cassell (16 February 1932 – 30 August 2017) was an English Australian actor, on stage, film and television.

== Early life ==
Alan Cassell was born in Manchester, England but grew up in Birmingham. Cassell was of a young age when his mother was admitted to the Rubery Lunatic Asylum after she suffered brain damage following a visit to a dentist. It is believed the dentist had left the gas on for too long which caused the brain damage.

Cassell worked as a motor trimmer in an Austin Motor Company car factory in Birmingham during the 1950s. He also performed national service, although a senior officer convinced him not to volunteer for service in the Korean War. After meeting a woman called Rosina, they married and in 1957 emigrated to Perth in Western Australia as 'Ten Pound Poms', where he continued his work as a motor trimmer before moving to the sales department.

== Career ==
Cassell began working as an actor, when he and his friend signed up for acting classes hosted by the Patch Theatre Company in Western Australia, effectively kicking off his stage career. His first role was a doctor with a two-word speaking part, but he was soon playing the lead in subsequent productions. Cassell became heavily involved with promoting theatre in Perth and helped establish a theatre called The Hole in the Wall. When Edgar Metcalfe was brought out to Australia to run The Playhouse Theatre, he began casting Cassell and the two became good friends.

He won a Best Actor of the Year award for his role in A Day in the Death of Joe Egg. He later worked for the Sydney Theatre Company and the Melbourne Theatre Company. Cassell also played Boss Finlay in a 1986 production of Sweet Bird of Youth alongside Lauren Bacall, accepting the role after the actor originally cast in it, Frank Wilson, suffered a heart attack. He was in the original cast of Away, which toured to New York in 1988, together with a production of Summer of the Seventeenth Doll.

Cassell was one of the actors who worked in Bruce Beresford’s early Australian films after moving to the eastern states to audition for Beresford and Hector Crawford. His film credits included Money Movers, Cathy's Child, Squizzy Taylor, Breaker Morant, Puberty Blues, The Club, The Honourable Wally Norman and Strange Bedfellows.

After appearing in the short-lived soap opera Taurus Rising as Ben Drysdale and Network Ten's crime drama Special Squad in 1984, Cassell swore off joining any further long-running series following a run of bad luck with several projects. However, he signed up to play the recurring role of George Young in Neighbours, shortly before learning it too had been cancelled, albeit temporarily. Cassell believed he would have joined the show anyway, as the character was unlike any he had portrayed before. He had become known for his 'tough guy' image from working on Beresford's films, and he hoped the Neighbours role would show producers a different side to him.

Other television roles included The Drifter, Falcon Island, The Flying Doctors, The Power, The Passion, Blue Heelers, SeaChange, Stingers and MDA.

Cassell was recognised with a win at the 1979 Sammy Awards for his role in the film Cathy's Child. He was also nominated for Best Actor in a Leading Role at the 1979 Australian Film Institute Awards.

== Personal life and death ==
Cassell was married to wife Rosina and together they emigrated to Perth, Western Australia in 1957 and had two sons.

From 1983, Cassell lived in Victoria. He was a prominent member of the Save Albert Park movement, after it was first proposed the Australian Grand Prix would relocate to the area where Cassell would walk his dogs.

In his later years, Cassell was diagnosed with dementia and lived in an aged care facility at Kyneton where he died on 30 August 2017 at the age of 85. After Cassell's death, Australian film director Bruce Beresford placed an obituary in The Age and The Sydney Morning Herald in which he described Cassell as "one of the most gifted actors I have had the privilege to work with – and one of the most charming."

== Awards ==
Year	Work	Award	Category	Result	Ref.
1968?	A Day in the Death of Joe Egg		Best Actor of the Year	Won	
1979	Cathy's Child	Sammy Awards	Best Film Actor	Won	
1979	Cathy's Child	Australian Film Institute Awards	Best Actor in a Leading Role	Nominated	

== Filmography ==
=== Film ===
Year	Title	Role	Notes
1975	Plugg	Herman Cavanagh	
1975	The Olive Tree		
1978	Money Movers	Detective Sergeant Sammy Ross	
1979	Cathy's Child	Dick Wordley	
1980	Harlequin	Mr. Porter	
1980	Breaker Morant	Lord Kitchener	
1980	The Club	Gerry Cooper	
1981	Puberty Blues	Mr. Vickers	
1982	The Highest Honor	Lt. Ted Carse	
1982	Squizzy Taylor	Det. Brophy	
1982	The Dark Room	Ray Sangster	
1983	The Settlement	Lohan	
1986	The Big Hurt	Blake	
1987	Belinda	Belinda's father	also known as Midnight Dancer
2003	The Honourable Wally Norman	Willy Norman	
2004	Strange Bedfellows	Stan Rogers	Final film role

=== Television ===
Year	Title	Role	Notes
1973	The Drifter	James Halloran	
1981	Falcon Island	Jack Brady	Series regular
1982	Taurus Rising	Ben Drysdale	Series regular
1984	Special Squad	Det. Insp. Don Anderson	Series regular
1985	Neighbours	George Young	Recurring role
1987	The Flying Doctors	Robert Freeman	Episode: "The Unluckiest Boy in Town"
1989	The Power, The Passion	Dr Andrew Edmonds	Series regular
1997	Blue Heelers	Henry Biggins	Episodes: "Sisterly Love" and "The Civil Dead"
1998–2000	SeaChange	Harold Fitzwalter	Seasons 1-3, series regular
2001	Halifax f.p.	Doctor Wallace	Episode: "Playing God"
2003	Stingers	George Lyndon	Episode: "Your Cheating Heart"
2003	MDA	Dr. Oscar Ricketson	Episode: "A Reasonable Passion"

== Theatre ==
Year	Title	Role	Notes
1961	All My Sons	George Deever	Patch Theatre, Perth
1962	A Taste of Honey		Playhouse, Perth with Theatre 62, & National Theatre
1963	The Member of the Wedding	Honey Camden Brown	Playhouse, Perth with National Theatre
1964	Send Me No Flowers		Playhouse, Perth with National Theatre
1965	Rattle of a Simple Man		Hole in the Wall Theatre, Perth
1966	Woman in a Dressing Gown		Hole in the Wall Theatre, Perth
1967	The Homecoming		Hole in the Wall Theatre, Perth
1968	A Day in the Death of Joe Egg		Hole in the Wall Theatre, Perth
1970	You Can't Take It With You	Author	Hole in the Wall Theatre, Perth
1971	The Procurer		Hole in the Wall Theatre, Perth
1972	Mirage		Octagon Theatre, Perth with National Theatre
1973	It's All in the Mind		Hole in the Wall Theatre, Perth
1975	Bedfellows		Hole in the Wall Theatre, Perth
1976	A Man for All Seasons		Playhouse, Perth with National Theatre
1976	The Gentle Hook		Playhouse, Perth with National Theatre
1976	Who's Afraid of Virginia Woolf?		Western Australian Theatre Company
1976	Mixed Doubles		Hole in the Wall Theatre, Perth
1977	How Does Your Garden Grow?	Sam	Hole in the Wall Theatre, Perth
1977	The Miser	Valere	Playhouse, Perth with National Theatre
1977	The Department	Robby	Playhouse, Perth with National Theatre
1977	Absent Friends	Colin	Playhouse, Perth with National Theatre
1977	Otherwise Engaged	Stephen Hench	Playhouse, Perth with National Theatre
1977	Yesterday's News	Roche	Greenroom Theatre, Perth
1977	Going Home	Jim	Greenroom Theatre, Perth with National Theatre
1977	Bastardy / Statements After an Arrest Under the Immorality Act		Greenroom Theatre, Perth with National Theatre
1977	Martello Towers	Anthony Martello	Hole in the Wall Theatre, Perth with National Theatre
1977	Of Mice and Men	Carlson	Playhouse, Perth with National Theatre
1977	The Brass Hat	Lt Col Guy Holden	Playhouse, Perth with National Theatre
1978	Richard II	Henry Bolingbroke	Playhouse, Perth with National Theatre
1978	Miss Julie	Jean	Greenroom Theatre, Perth with National Theatre
1978	California Suite		Hole in the Wall Theatre, Perth
1979	No W.A.Y.		Hole in the Wall Theatre, Perth
1979	One Flew Over the Cuckoo's Nest	R P McMurphy	Hole in the Wall Theatre, Perth
1979	Night and Day	Dick Wagner	Playhouse, Perth with National Theatre
1979	The Three Sisters	Alexandr Vershinin	Playhouse, Perth with National Theatre
1979	Suddenly at Home	Sam Blaine	Playhouse, Perth with National Theatre
1979	No Man's Land	Briggs	Playhouse, Perth with National Theatre
1979	The Little Foxes	Horace Giddens	Playhouse, Perth with National Theatre
1980	Betrayal	Jerry	Playhouse, Perth with National Theatre
1980	The Same Square of Dust	Keith Anderson	Playhouse, Perth with National Theatre
1980	Oliver!	Bill Sykes	Playhouse, Perth with National Theatre
1981	Stage Struck	Robert	Hole in the Wall Theatre, Perth
1981	Bodies	Mervyn	Hole in the Wall Theatre, Perth
1981	Court Napping	Writer	Hole in the Wall Theatre, Perth
1983	Gossip from the Forest	Matthias Erzberger	Sydney Opera House with STC
1986	Sweet Bird of Youth	Boss Finlay	Australian tour with Davis Morley
1986	Heartbreak House		Playhouse, Melbourne with MTC
1986–1987	Away		Studio Theatre, Melbourne with Playbox Theatre, Sydney Opera House with STC
1987	A Month of Sundays		Playhouse, Perth with Western Australian Theatre Company
1988	Summer of the Seventeenth Doll & Away		Pepsico Summerfare, New York with STC
1991	Educating Rita		Subiaco Theatre Centre, Perth with Hole in the Wall Theatre, Perth
1992	Othello	Gratiano	Playhouse, Melbourne with MTC
1994	The Gift of the Gorgon	Jarvis, Helen's father	Russell St Theatre, Melbourne with MTC
