= James Cruthers =

Australian businessman

James Winter Cruthers
- Born: 20 December 1924; Perth, Western Australia
- Died: 12 October 2015 (aged 90); Perth, Western Australia
- Occupations: Journalist; newspaper chairman; television network chairman (formerly station general manager); philanthropist

Sir James Winter Cruthers AO (20 December 1924 – 13 October 2015) was an Australian media business executive and philanthropist.

== Early life and career ==
Cruthers was born in 1924 and was educated at Claremont Central State School and Perth Technical College, leaving school at 16. He started work at the Daily News newspaper in Perth in 1939 and joined the forces in 1940. During the Second World War, he was a RAAF pilot.

After the war he became a cadet journalist at the Daily News, and was there when the paper hired Paul Rigby as a cartoonist.

In 1958, he was appointed as founding general manager of WA television station TVW Channel 7. He later was promoted chairman of the station.

His chairmanships, included the Australian Film Commission and News American Publishing Inc, where he was personal adviser to Rupert Murdoch. In 1999, he was chairman of The Sunday Times newspaper.

Cruthers was a philanthropist, who established TVW Telethon and Perth's annual Christmas pageant. He supported many charitable groups, including the Lions Eye Institute (where he was a founding patron), UWA's Hackett Foundation, Sir Charles Gairdner Hospital, the Association of the Blind (WA) Guide Dogs and the St George's Cathedral Restoration project. He was the business representative on UWA's Berndt Museum of Anthropology's advisory board.

Cruthers and his wife Lady (Sheila) Cruthers were strong supporters of the arts. His wife was especially interested in twentieth-century art by Australian women, and the Cruthers Collection of Women's Art (CCWA) is a collection of artworks by Australian women artists from the 1890s to the present. Both have supported the National Gallery of Australia and the US National Portrait Gallery. in June 2007, Cruthers and his wife donated the Cruthers Collection of Women's Art—more than 400 works by 155 Australian female artists including Grace Cossington Smith, Margaret Preston and Susan Norrie—to The University of Western Australia, where it is currently housed at the Lawrence Wilson Art Gallery.

In 1998 and 1999, Cruthers was conference patron of "small screen BIG PICTURE".

== Death ==
On 13 October 2015, Cruthers died at the age of 90.

== Honours ==
Cruthers was made a Knight Bachelor in the 1980 Birthday Honours. He was appointed an Officer of the Order of Australia in 2008.

Cruthers received the honorary degree Doctor of Letters from University of Western Australia in 2005.
