= Adrian Barich =

Australian rules footballer (born 1963)

Personal information
- Full name: Adrian Williams Barich
- Nickname: Barra
- Born: 5 December 1963 (age 62); Canberra
- Original team: Perth (WAFL)
- Height: 177 cm (5 ft 10 in)
- Weight: 85 kg (187 lb)
- Position: Midfielder

Playing career^{1}
Years	Club	Games (Goals)
1984–1994	Perth	161 (93)
1987–1992	West Coast	47 (27)
Total		208 (120)

Representative team honours
Years	Team	Games (Goals)
1988–1994	Western Australia	4 (1)
1992–1993	New South Wales/ACT	2
- ^{1} Playing statistics correct to the end of 1992.

Career highlights
- Runner-up 1994 Sandover Medal; WA Footballer of the Year 1994; Perth best and fairest 1994; Perth runner-up best and fairest 1984, 1985, 1986, 1993

Adrian Williams Barich (born 5 December 1963) is a sports presenter for television and radio, and a former Australian rules footballer for the West Coast Eagles and Perth Demons, and rugby league player.

== Early life ==
Barich grew up in Canberra, where he played multiple sports including rugby union (in which he represented the ACT), later as a teenager he moved over to Australian rules football and captained the first premiership for Marist College Pearce. He also played senior football for the now-defunct Manuka Football Club for three seasons and was part of their 1981 premiership team. In 1984 he moved to Perth to play for the Perth Football Club under coach Ian Miller.

== Sporting career ==
=== Australian rules football ===
==== Perth Football Club ====
Barich played Australian rules as a midfielder, halfback flanker and winger. After moving to Perth in 1984 and signing with the Perth Football Club he went on to play 160 games for the club and earn life membership. He also captained the side for two seasons.

==== West Coast Eagles ====
Barich was an inaugural member of the West Coast Eagles and played in their historic first game in 1987. In his 47 games, Barich proved to be a robust midfielder. His place in West Coast Eagles history was forged more for his off-field role in the 1992 premiership. After missing selection in the team, he and Phil Scott, another inaugural player, penned a moving letter to those players selected to represent the club, letting their teammates know how much victory would mean to those who could not play and what it meant to those players who had been involved from club infancy.

==== Representative football ====
Barich played AFL State of Origin football for New South Wales as well as representing Western Australia three times, captaining them in 1993.

=== Rugby league ===
In 1995 he joined Western Australia's newly formed Australian Rugby League club, the Western Reds and played for two seasons. However, he only played one first grade trial game and did not make a first grade appearance. Barich also played for North Beach Sea Eagles in the WARL.

== Media ==
=== Seven Network ===
Since 1995 Barich has been a television sports reporter and presenter with Seven News Perth. He was also a boundary commentator for the networks AFL coverage and part of Basil's Footy Show.

He permanently became the weekend sports presenter on Seven News Perth in late 2007 following the shock death of his colleague and friend Chris Mainwaring. Barich helps organise the Chris Mainwaring match for Telethon each year.

In 2010, Barich won the coveted Geoff Christian Medal for the best football journalist in Western Australia.

=== 6PR ===
Barich has a long association with radio station 6PR, going back to the late 1980s when he filled in for Graham Mabury on Nightline. In 2001 Barich paired with Basil Zempilas to co-host the breakfast program, and two and a half years later moved to Sports Today, alongside Brad Hardie and Karl Langdon. In mid-2006 Sports Today was revamped and called Sports Central.

Barich also covered the Western Force's Super 14 matches with Mick Collis on 6PR.

He is famous for saying "thank you very much", "gornski" and pronounces numbers like Lou Richards.

=== Mix 94.5 ===
In 2010, Barich left 6PR and launched a new show on Mix 94.5 called The Dead Set Legends. He co-hosted the show with Seven News Perth presenter Sally Bowrey. In July 2012, Angela Tsun replaced Bowrey and the current line-up features Tania Armstrong, Damian Martin and Andrew Embley.
