= Susannah Carr =

Australian television news presenter

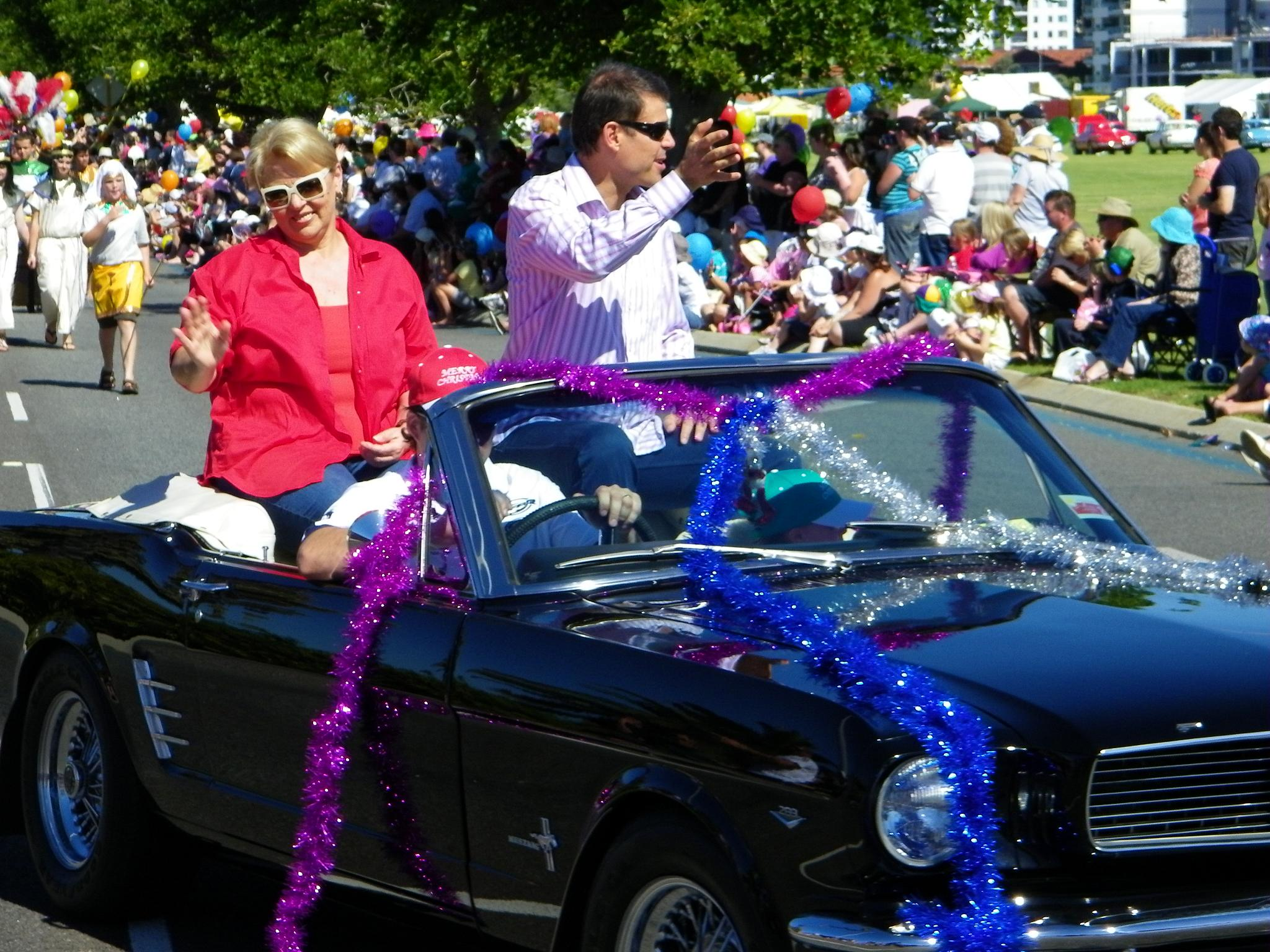
- With Rick Ardon in the 2008 Channel Seven Christmas pageant
- Born: Susannah Mary Carr; 21 July 1952 (age 74); Rochford, England, United Kingdom
- Other name: Sue
- Occupation: Newsreader
- Years active: 1973–present
- Employer: Seven Network

Susannah Carr (born 21 July 1952) is an Australian television news presenter. Since 1985, Carr has co-presented Seven News in Perth with Rick Ardon. The pair are recognised by Guinness World Records as the world's longest-serving TV news anchor duo, having been on the air together for 40 years.

== Early life and education ==
Carr was born in London, England. She arrived in Perth, Western Australia from the UK with her parents when she was 7 months old.

For her schooling, she attended North Cottesloe Primary for Years 1 and 2; Cottesloe Primary for Year 3 and Iona Presentation College for Years 4 to 12. She studied for a Bachelor of Arts at University of Western Australia and is also a qualified architectural draftsperson.

She is a granddaughter of the singer Robert Carr and niece of the detective novelist Antony Carr.

== Career ==
Carr's media career began in 1974 with ABC Radio in Perth as an announcer. Two weeks after joining the station, she was broadcasting on Christmas Day when Cyclone Tracy hit Darwin. She worked in both radio and TV in Perth for the ABC becoming that station's first female TV news presenter in Perth for the ABC.

Carr was asked to join TVW 7 in 1985 and became a face of Channel 7 news in Perth along with her long-time co-anchor Rick Ardon. Under their guard, Seven Nightly News rose to the top of the ratings in Perth, where it remains as of today.

In 1986, Carr won the Logie Award for Most Popular Female, Western Australia. In the same year, her co-anchor Ardon won the Logie Award for Most Popular Male, Western Australia. In 2000, she was inducted an Honorary Member by the Edith Cowan University chapter of the Golden Key International Honour Society.

Carr broadcast live from South Africa during that country's first all-race elections and reported from London in the week after the death of Princess Diana. She also headed a film crew to Moscow, Russia, where they were granted access inside the Kremlin, to make the documentary "The Secret Treasures of the Kremlin".

Carr presented coverage from Perth nationally during the 2014 Sydney hostage siege due to Seven News Sydney studios in Martin Place being evacuated. She was part of the Seven News team whom were awarded a Walkley Award in 2015 for their coverage that night.

While covering Prince Harry's wedding in 2018, Carr noted how technological advances had facilitated broadcasting since her 1997 coverage of his mother's death.

In January 2026, it was announced that Carr and Rick Ardon would transition to presenting Seven News Perth from Thursday to Saturday, with Tim McMillan and Angela Tsun presenting from Sunday to Wednesday.
