= Angela Tsun =

Australian presenter

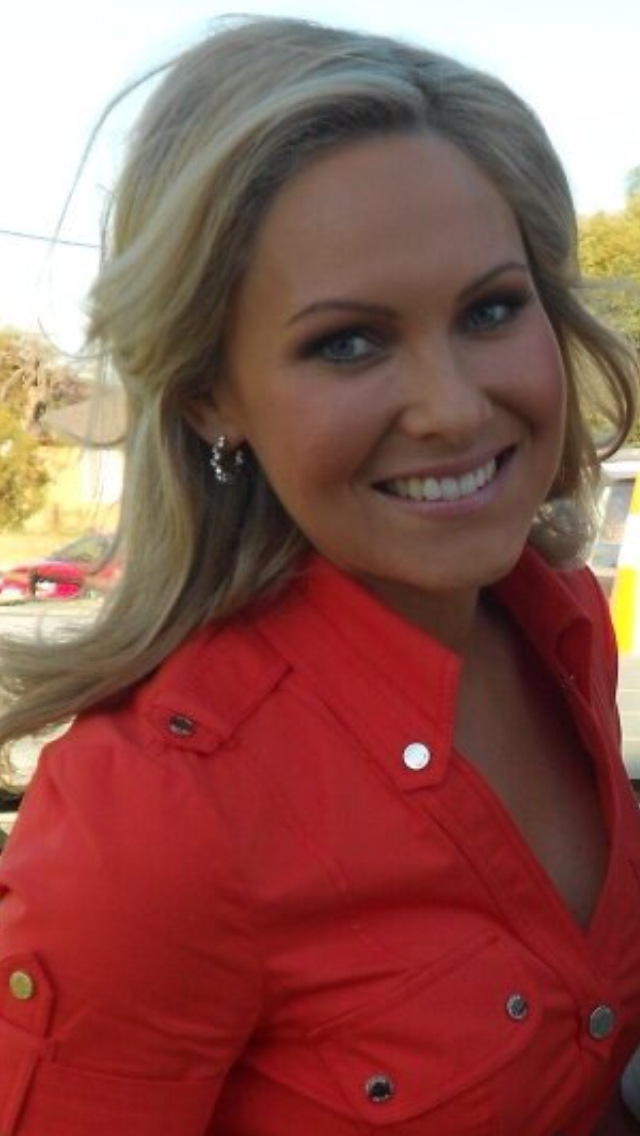
- Tsun in April 2013
- Born: 27 August 1982 (age 44); Darlinghurst, New South Wales
- Education: University of New South Wales
- Occupation: Journalist
- Employer: Seven Network

Angela Tsun (born 27 August 1982) is an Australian television and radio presenter.

Tsun is currently the Sunday–Wednesday news presenter on Seven News in Perth, alongside Tim McMillan. She also currently co-hosts The Dead Set Legends on Mix 94.5.

== Career ==
Tsun lived, studied and worked in Sydney before taking up residence in Perth.

During Tsun's first semester of studying Science Communications at the University of New South Wales, after an excursion to Foxtel's The Weather Channel, she was offered the job of a weather presenter by the television station.

Tsun began her reporting career as a weather presenter in 2002 on Foxtel's The Weather Channel in Sydney where she hosted the documentary series Wild World of Weather and presented the Beach and Surf reports.

In 2008, Tsun moved to Perth to join the Nine Network and WIN Television news team at Nine News Perth. She presented weather on the 4:30pm and 6pm news bulletins; she also hosted Postcards WA. She also regularly filed travels stories for Getaway and reported on Today.

In January 2013, Tsun joined the Seven Network as a weather presenter on the Seven News Perth to anchor the local Seven 4.30 News and present the weather on the 6pm news from Monday to Thursday.

In February 2015, Tsun was appointed weekend presenter of Seven News Perth. She also co-hosts The Dead Set Legends with Adrian Barich on Mix 94.5.

In January 2026, it was announced that Tsun and Tim McMillan would transition to presenting Seven News Perth from Sunday to Wednesday, with long-serving pair Rick Ardon and Susannah Carr presenting from Thursday to Saturday.

== Affiliations ==
Tsun is a member of the Australian Science Communicators Association (ASC).
