= The Hole in the Wall Theatre =

Theatre in Perth, Western Australia

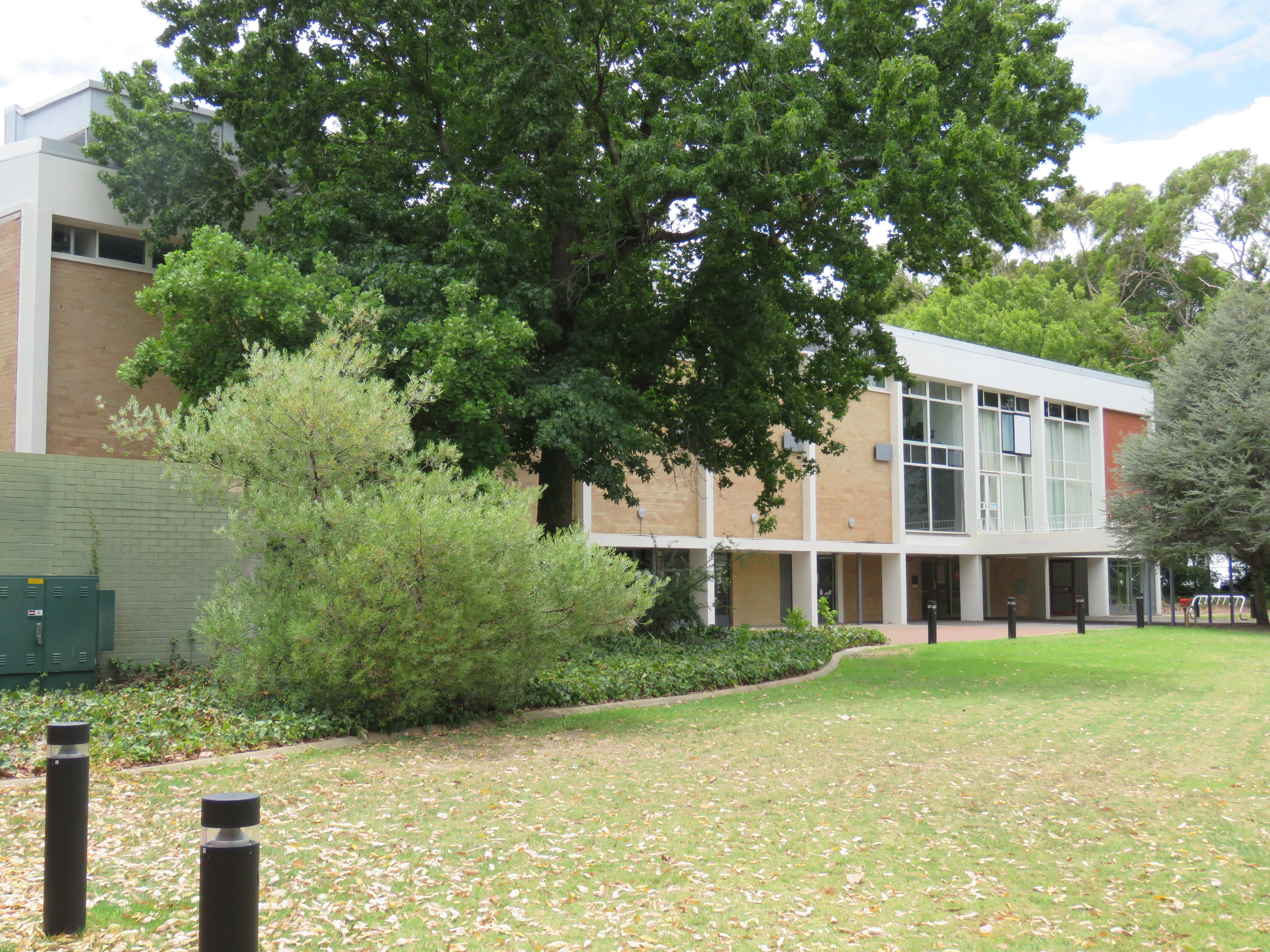
- The former Subiaco City Hall, now the Subiaco Arts Centre

General information
- Coordinates: 31.951783°S 115.820411°E

Western Australia Heritage Register
- Official name: Subiaco Arts Centre
- Type: State Registered Place
- Designated: 15 May 1998
- Reference no.: 4653

The Hole in the Wall Theatre was a small theatre in the Perth suburb of Leederville, Western Australia, operating from 1968 to 1984. In 1984 it was relocated to a civic auditorium in Subiaco which, as of 2020, is known as the Subiaco Arts Centre, a heritage-listed building, managed by the Perth Theatre Trust.

== History ==
The original Hole in the Wall Theatre was established in 1965 in Newcastle Street, Perth by Frank Baden-Powell and John Gill.

In August 1968 the Hole in the Wall was relocated to a converted warehouse in Southport Street, Leederville. For part of the Southport Street era, Richard Davey was director of the theatre. It also had produced a newsletter. Edgar Metcalfe had also been director of the theatre.

In 1984 the theatre moved to the new Subiaco Theatre Centre, part of the Subiaco Civic Hall. Its first show there was on 4 August. The new theatre building in Subiaco was designed by Perth architect Peter Parkinson. His other projects include the Octagon and Dolphin theatres at the University of Western Australia.

Hole in the Wall artistic director Raymond Omodei told ABC TV's Stateline in 2006 that the theatre's unique corner stage, while criticised by some directors, was still one of the best, saying:

it's a very demanding space, but Joan Sydney, Amanda Muggleton and the very lovely Jill Perryman has each said this is the best space for a performer in the country. In my last year here we played to 89,000 people. We had great success here [...].

In an assessment of the centre, the Heritage Council of Western Australia said the building was "significant in displaying aesthetic qualities of the Post-War International style. The formality and rhythm created by the articulated structure are balanced by the interest provided in contrasting materials".

In 1987 Omodei directed Richard Dillane as Hamlet and in 1989 a production of Travesties by Tom Stoppard with John O'Hare as James Joyce and Bruce Hughes as Tristan Zara and in 1991 a production of Henrik Ibsen's A Doll's House starred Greta Scacchi as Nora, Michael Loney as Torvald Helmer, Andrew Warwick as Dr Rank and Anni Murtagh-Monks as Kristine Linde.
