= HD Lite =

HD Lite is the re-transmission of a particular HDTV channel at reduced picture quality compared to the original source stream.

== Background ==
In a simplified view of US digital-TV distribution, the cable/sat operator receives a programing feed (producer) from a network station, repackages it for carriage on a data-network or distribution channel (satellite, digital-cable) of known parameters, then re-transmits the modified bitstream to the customer-site (viewer.) The viewer's set-top-box decoder decompresses the delivered bitstream, and displays the program on-screen.

HD Lite refers to the TV-program received by the viewer, which has been somehow compromised (reduced) in fidelity. In internet vernacular, HD-Lite generally refers to programming delivered by commercial (subscription-based) providers such as DirecTV, Dish Network, and the major cable-TV operators. This is likely due to the customer's (heightened) expectation of a base quality level of service — that a commercial operator should provide service levels (in terms of transmission without freezing, for example) equal to or better than public over-the-air (free) ATSC-broadcast programming. In other words, picture quality is lessened, so that delivery of the picture becomes more reliable.

HD Lite can be achieved by any combination of several techniques. Rate-shaping dynamically adjusts allocated bit rate for each of a set of TV-channels, based on an allocation-policy (which can come from realtime video-analysis or an operator-specified program weighting.) Rate shaping allows a set of channels to be transmitted with less bandwidth, based on the statistical observation that not all channels display the same level of motion-activity at a given instant of time (or the period of observation.) Downsampling reduces the spatial (horizontal and/or vertical) resolution of the TV-program, reducing the TV-signal's pixel-rate, and therefore its bandwidth requirements. Thus far, customers have reported downsampling on "1080i" signals only; 1920x1080i can be downsampled to 1440x1080i or 1280x1080i, with a corresponding reduction in transmission bandwidth. In contrast, over-the-air (ATSC) broadcasts of 1080i are fixed at 1920x1080. Temporal (frame-rate) reduction has not been attempted yet, as it unacceptably changes the character of motion video sequences.

Any form of rate-shaping or downsampling is inherently intrusive, in that the source bitstream is altered significantly, often due to a full re-compression process. Distortion (caused by the operator) is characterized by reduced sharpness, reduced detail, excessive compression artifacts (mosquito noise and blocking), and in some cases, alteration of the color-palette. The reduced video quality is assumed to be introduced by the sat/cable operator's handling of the source video (recompression.)

Digital video compression is a complex field of study. Downsampling and bitrate-reduction are often deployed together, to prevent the pixel/bitrate ratio from falling below acceptable levels.

Some material shown on 1080i high-definition channels in the US originates from material shot on older cameras that was only capable of 1440 samples per scanline, yet this material is generally quite acceptable to most viewers and is considered high-definition. Focusing on resolution alone can be misleading. For example, a signal transmitted in its original 1920 x 1080 format, even if only having 1440 unique samples per scanline, will likely appear superior to a highly recompressed signal shown at 1440 x 1080 with a lower bitrate than the standard 19.2 Mbit/s.

In the US television programming market, cable and DBS/satellite operators compete against each other to deliver HDTV programming. An HDTV program requires much higher datarates (3-4x) than a standard-definition program. This places a huge burden on a service-operator, which must deliver a variety of programming (many channels), including increasing amounts of HDTV programming, over a resource-constrained distribution medium. Re-compression by cable/satellite operators is a technical necessity for carriage of diverse TV-programming over limited bandwidth capacity of the respective providers.

What remains to be seen, is whether the cable/sat service providers leverage re-compression of TV-programs only as a short-term arrangement until greater capacity can be brought online, or a permanent fixture in their distribution and business model.

== Technical merits to reduced resolution ==
In 1998 ABC Television made available the "Frequently Asked Questions" document in regards to HDTV standard, chosen by the company, which was 720p. One of the questions, titled "Which scanning standard is best suited for future?" contained the following information:

The 1080 x 1920 (1080I) interlace format specified in the ATSC standard CANNOT be compressed to fit in a 6 MHz channel without creating objectionable artifacts and it has been recommended that the 1920 pixels be sub-sampled to 1440 to reduce compression artifacts. Therefore, encoder manufacturers have elected to discard approximately 25% of the picture for over-the-air transmission.

—

Besides subsampling that occurs during broadcast, many professional video recording formats do not deliver full horizontal resolution as well. For example, frame size of 1080-line HDCAM format is 1440x1080, frame size of 1080-line DVCPRO HD format is either 1440x1080 or 1280x1080 depending on scanning rate, frame size of 720-line DVCPRO HD format is 960x720. Horizontal downsampling is used in preference to vertical downsampling because vertical downsampling would break any interlacing, and also because cathode-ray tube (CRT) displays (which were still common when the HD formats were standardised) scan horizontal rows continuously, but vertical lines discretely, making changes to vertical resolution more visible on such displays. The situation has begun to change with launch of newer video recording formats that use full 1920x1080 raster, like XDCAM HD422 or AVC-Intra.

New encoding schemes allow reducing data rate even further. For example, MPEG-4/AVC is considered to be twice as efficient as MPEG-2, originally used for HD broadcast.

== Operators who alter HDTV re-transmission ==
In September 2007, Dish Network reduced the resolution on HBO-HD and Showtime-HD from 1920x1080 to 1440x1080. These were the last two channels that Dish Network was still offering in the "full" 1920x1080 resolution.

In August 2009, BBC HD in the UK reduced the average data rate from 16 Mbit/s to 9.7 Mbit/s, after introducing new MPEG-4 AVC/H.264 encoding software. The resolution of BBC HD had been set to 1440x1080 since launch, following the practice established by the BBC HD Test channel. BBC mentioned limitations of existing HD video cameras, improved encoding scheme and a desire to deliver more HD channels within existing bandwidth among the reasons for this action. An increase to 1920 horizontal resolution was however, observed on 30 May 2012.

== Cohen vs DirecTV ==
Peter Cohen has filed a class-action lawsuit against DirecTV that questions the legitimacy of DirecTV's "astonishing quality" marketing-claim.
