= List of programs broadcast by Channel 31 =

This is a list of programs that have been, are being, or will be broadcast by Television Sydney, 31 Melbourne, Brisbane 31, 44 Adelaide, Perth Television and Darwin 44 along with other former Community channels.

== Current and former programming ==
=== 0–9 ===
- 1700

=== B ===
- The Bazura Project
- Blokesworld

=== D ===
- Darren and Brose
- The Darren Sanders Show

=== E ===
- Eastern Newsbeat

=== F ===
- Fishcam

=== H ===
- Here's Humphrey
- Hot Dog with the Lot

=== I ===
- In Pit Lane

=== K ===
- KO Boxing
- KO Fight Night

=== L ===
- Level 3
- Live on Bowen

=== M ===
- The Marngrook Footy Show
- MCM
- Melbourne International Comedy Festival 2017

=== O ===
- Ocean Girl

=== P ===
- Pete Boone, Private Eye
- Prisoner

=== R ===
- Raucous
- Russian Kaleidoscope

=== S ===
- Salam Cafe
- Saturday Night Darren & Brose
- Studio A

=== U ===
- Under Melbourne Tonight

=== V ===
- Vasili's Garden
- Vasili’s Garden To Kitchen

=== W ===
- Wake Up! WA
- What's Goin' On There?
- Whose Shout

== See also ==
- List of Australian television series
- List of longest running Australian television series
- List of Australian television news services
