= 2004 Antenna Awards =

Awards show honouring achievements in Australian community television

- 2004 Antenna Awards title card
- Date: February 28, 2004
- Location: Storey Hall, RMIT City Campus, Melbourne
- Country: Australia
- Hosted by: Esther Makris; Gary Mitchell

Highlights
- Most awards: Radio Karate (4)
- Most nominations: Radio Karate (8)
- Program of the Year: Pluck

Television/radio coverage
- Network: Channel 31 Melbourne; Channel 31 Sydney; Briz 31 Brisbane; C31 Adelaide; Access 31 Perth; LINC TV Lismore
- Runtime: 80 minutes
- Produced by: Kristy Fuller
- Directed by: Craig Young

The 2004 Antenna Awards ceremony honoured the best in Australian community television in 2003, and took place on February 28, 2004, at Storey Hall, RMIT City Campus, Melbourne, beginning at 7:00 p.m. AEST. The ceremony, the first of its kind in Australia, was announced on December 29, 2003. Produced by Kristy Fuller and directed by Craig Young, the ceremony was hosted by Esther Makris and Gary Mitchell.

Antennas were presented in 31 categories. Radio Karate won four awards, including Best Comedy Program and Best Editing, the most for the evening. Other winners include Dawn's Creek and Pluck with two awards, including Program of the Year for Pluck.

The ceremony was televised live by Channel 31 Melbourne, Channel 31 Sydney, Briz 31 Brisbane, C31 Adelaide, and LINC TV Lismore, and on a one-week delay to Access 31 Perth. On 19 March 2015, the ceremony was made available to stream on YouTube.

== Awards ==
Winners are listed first and highlighted in boldface.

**Best Comedy Program**: **Radio Karate – Tim Bartley, Andy Lee, Hamish Blake, Ryan Shelton & Duncan Campbell**; Blokesworld; Champagne Comedy; Rant; Raucous; The Rumpus Room	**Best Drama Program**: **Yartz – "Filthy Pervert Seeks Same" – Ralph Mclean & Peter Hanrahan**; Yartz – "Coffee"; Yartz – "Ripe"; Yartz – "White Bred"
**Best Arts Program**: **Short Film Distillery – Adam Clarkson**; **Public Hangings – Andrew Mckenzie**; Gallery Watch; Romanian Mosaic; Yartz; Young Originals 2003	**Best Music Program**: **Music Pot – Richard Micallef**; Chartbusting 80s; Asylum; Nu Country TV; SYN TV; Warp Factory
**Best Variety Program**: **Living It Loud – Steve Williams**; Dawn's Crack; G'Day Maltaussies; Raucous; S+M The Wine Show; Socialite	**Best News/Current Affairs Program**: **Woomera 2002 – Anthony Snowden**; **Freeway – Desmond Mouti**; C News; Newsline; Not In Our Name; Perth Talks To CTV
**Best Interview Program**: **Fashion Police – Leila Koren**; Books WA; Living It Loud; Nat Chat; Robina Courtin About; Stat	**Best Sports Program**: **MXTV – Brendan Bell**; End to End: Lawn Bowls in WA; Hold Ya Horses; Jack and the Greentalk; Let's Go Fishing; Skipper Trucks Baseball
**Best Panel Program**: **Sweet And Sour – Lena Andel**; Hold Ya Horses; Jack and the Greentalk; No Limits; The Reviewers; The Stayers	**Best Live/Outside Broadcast Program**: **Geelong Carols In The Park – Peter Wood & Dean Gray (Videoworks)**; Benefit Concert; Dawn's Crack; Frontiers at the Forum; Hungarian Community Song Festival; Southern Footy Show
**Best Culturally and Linguistically Diverse Program**: **At Home with the Baccalas – Joe DeMartino**; Aaj Kal; Pinoy TV; Qua e La with Tom Padula; Sound of the Perfume River; TV Sri Lanka	**Best Faith Program**: **Robina Courtin About – Peter Lane**; Breaking Barriers; Romanian Mosaic; The Young Buddhist
**Best Sound**: **S+M The Wine Show – Michael Buckland**; Briefcase; Dig & Dine with Denise; Fashionations; Warp Factory; Youth Scope	**Best Camerawork**: **Radio Karate – Tim Bartley**; Breakaway; Dig & Dine with Denise; Fashionations; S+M The Wine Show; St Kilda Baths - Sponsorship Announcement
**Best Editing**: **Extreme WA – Jeffrey Williams**; Cinema; Cooking Cleverly with Beverly; Radio Karate; S+M The Wine Show; Shoot!	**Best Indigenous Program**: **Songlines In The City – "Christmas" – Peter Johnson**; NAIDOC Day 2003; Gallery Watch "Coming Home"; Frontiers at the Forum
**Best Children's Program**: **Playgroup In A Box – Yvonne Healy**; Scouts Australia Campwest; SYN TV	**Best Youth Program**: **Youth Scope – Anita Krsnik, Michael Zampogna & Simon Hydzik**; Dawn's Crack; Pluck; SYN TV; Teenwire; The Vibe
**Best Program for Senior Living Viewers**: **Time Of Your Life – Peter Haydock**; Dig & Dine with Denise; End to End: Lawn Bowls in WA; Friday Night Live; Theatre Royal; The Garden Tap	**Best Music Composition**: **Dawn's Crack – "Half Hour Shower" – Simon Barlow, Nick Barlow, Tim Beveridge & Matt Mckenzie**; C31 Melbourne Station IDs; Playgroup In A Box; Raucous; Short Film Distillery; Who Wants to Survive Being a Popstar with the Weakest Mole?
**Best Station ID**: **C31 Melbourne – Rob Nairn & Mat Govoni**; Channel 31 Sydney	**Best Program ID / Main Title / Promo**: **Radio Karate – Tim Bartley**; Army Reserves; Cooking Cleverly with Beverly; Love on the Box; Short Film Distillery; Summer SYN TV; Treasure Hunt
**Best Sponsorship Announcement**: **Manny's Music – Andrew Coyle & Rob Nairn**; Boat Search; Jackie O; Merchandise Message; Renmark Homes; Sirens Restaurant	**Best Program That Supports Local Metropolitan Communities**: **Eye on Perth – Andrew Round**; Briefcase; C News; Copp This; Deaf TV; Le Chaim - To Life: Jewish Vision
**Best Program That Supports Local Rural And Regional Communities**: **Balls N All**; Mandurah Christmas Special; Playgroup In A Box; QSMARTZ; Western Stars Spectacular	**Special Awards for Programs That Have Made Significant Contributions to the Diversity of Community Television**: **No Limits – Sarah Barton**; **Theories of Everything – David Tow**; **Vasili's Garden – Peter Deskes**; Classical Catapult; Frontiers at the Forum; Melbourne Musos; My World; Nusantara TV
**Best New Producer**: **Tim Bartley – Radio Karate**; Alana Kornfeld – This Town Brisbane; Claire Butler & Josephine Sicilano – Raucous; Naomi Davis – Pluck; Ricki-Jane McArthur – Breakaway; Simon Hydzick – Teenwire	**Best Female Presenter**: **Cheryle Wilson – Harvest Festival**; Dewani Shebubaker – SYN TV; Denise Drysdale – Dig & Dine with Denise; Emma Race – Dawn's Crack; Karen Gruner – Weekend Gardener; Sophia Hlinovsky – This Town Brisbane; Stella Young – No Limits
**Best Male Presenter**: **Jack Post & Alex Ford – SYN TV**; Andy Lee – Radio Karate; Jeff Jenkins – Chartbusting 80s; John Lewis – Gallery Watch; John McKenna – No Limits; Hamish Blake – Radio Karate; Scott McAnally – S+M The Wine Show	**Producer of the Year**: **Shona Devlin – Dawn's Crack & Pluck**; Andrew McKenzie – Public Hangings; Anneliese Morgan & Andrea Williams – The Rumpus Room; Steve Williams – Living It Loud; Tibor Meszaros – CTV Perth; Zoe Dennstein – S+M The Wine Show
**Program of the Year**: **Pluck – Shona Devlin & Kristy Fuller**; Living it Loud; Radio Karate; Raucous; Teenwire; The Rumpus Room; This Town Brisbane; Yartz

=== Programs with multiple nominations and awards ===
Programs that received multiple nominations
Nominations	Program
8	Radio Karate (Note: Includes nominations for individuals)
6	Dawn's Crack
6	S+M The Wine Show
6	SYN TV (Note: Includes nomination for Summer SYN TV)
6	Yartz (Note: Includes nominations for episodes)
5	Raucous
4	Dig & Dine with Denise
4	Living It Loud
4	No Limits
4	Pluck
3	Frontiers at the Forum
3	Gallery Watch
3	Playgroup In A Box
3	Short Film Distillery
3	Teenwire
3	The Rumpus Room
3	This Town Brisbane
2	Breakaway
2	C News
2	Chartbusting 80s
2	Cooking Cleverly with Beverly
2	Fashionations
2	End to End: Lawn Bowls in WA
2	Hold Ya Horses
2	Jack and the Greentalk
2	Public Hangings
2	Robina Courtin About
2	Romanian Mosaic
2	Warp Factory
2	Youth Scope

Programs that received multiple awards
Awards	Program
4	Radio Karate
2	Dawn's Crack
2	Pluck

== Presenters and performers ==
The following individuals presented awards or performed musical numbers.

=== Presenters ===
Name(s)	Role
Bryce Ives	Master of Ceremonies
Joelene Crnogorac	Announcer
Amy Parks; Carmen Petropulo; Tanja Nedel	Presenters of the awards for Best Comedy Program, Best Drama Program and Best Arts Program
Lena Andel; Kevin Jope	Presenters of the awards for Best Music Program, Best Variety Program and Best News/Current Affairs Program
Ryan Shelton; Andy Lee	Presenters of the awards for Best Interview Program, Best Sports Program and Best Panel Program
Andrew Brine	Keynote speaker
Ting Cheng; Cher Zhong	Presenters of the awards for Best Live/Outside Broadcast Program, Best Culturally and Linguistically Diverse Program and Best Faith Program
Tom Padula; Tanveer Ahmed	Presenters of the awards for Best Sound, Best Camerawork and Best Editing
Tara Strong; Graeme Stephens	Presenters of the awards for Best Indigenous Program and Best Children's Program
Joy Hruby; John McKenna	Presenters of the awards for Best Youth Program and Best Program for Senior Living Viewers
Sudha Saimi; Vasili Kanidiadis	Presenters of the awards for Best Music Composition, Best Station ID and Best Program ID / Main Title / Promo
Julie Cvitan; Daniel Burt	Presenters of the awards for Best Sponsorship Announcement, Best Program That Supports Local Metropolitan Communities and Best Program That Supports Local Rural And Regional Communities
Amy Morrison; Joe DeMartino	Presenters of the Special Awards for Programs That Have Made Significant Contributions to the Diversity of Community Television and Best New Producer
Scott Brennan	Presenter of the awards for Best Female Presenter and Best Male Presenter
Wayne Rogers; Simon Marshall	Presenter of the awards for Producer of the Year and Presenter of the Year

=== Performers ===
Name(s)	Role	Performed
Monica Weightman Band	Performers	"Lost Generation"
Sabrina Chou Dance Group	Performers	Cultural dance routine

== See also ==
- Logie Awards of 2004
- 2004 Australian Film Institute Awards
- 2004 ASTRA Awards
