= Timeline of Australian television =

This timeline of Australian television lists important station launches, programs, major television events, and technological advancements that have significantly changed the forms of broadcasting available to viewers of television in Australia. The history of television in Australia can be traced back to an announcement from the Menzies' government concerning plans for television services in Sydney and Melbourne.

The new medium was introduced by Bruce Gyngell with the words "Good evening, and welcome to television". Colour television was introduced in 1975, while subscription television, initially on the Galaxy platform, began in the mid-1990s. Digital terrestrial television was introduced on 1 January 2001 in Australia's five largest capital cities, later to be expanded to smaller cities and regional areas.

== 1920s ==
- Experimental TV broadcasts began as early as 1929 in Melbourne on stations 3DB and 3UZ using the Radiovision system by Gilbert Miles and Donal McDonald.
- Thomas (Tom) M. B. Elliott experiments with an electromechanical version of television using the Nipkow disc technique that Baird employed.

== 1930s ==
- Other experimental transmissions followed in other cities, such as the 30 line Baird system in Brisbane in 1934 by Tom Elliott and Dr Val McDowall, members of the Royal Society of Queensland, at the amateur station (VK)4CM. By 1938 Elliot demonstrated an electronic 180 line version.

== 1940s ==
- Broadcasting tests halted due to the advent of World War 2.

== 1950s ==
1950

- June: Robert Menzies' government announces a gradual introduction of television in Australia, with plans to launch an ABC Television station in Sydney and other areas subject to funding approval. As well as this, commercial television services in Sydney and Melbourne are planned with "any other capital city where it is felt that the applicant's capacity to provide a service justifies the issue of a licence".

1953

- January: The Menzies government amends the 1948 Broadcasting Act to provide legislative framework for commercial television licenses.

1954

- The Royal Commission on Television affirms the need to introduce television under a dual system of ownership, similarly to the Menzies plan.

1956

- 13 July: Test transmissions commence in Sydney on TCN-9 in monochrome.
- 16 July: HSV-7 Melbourne commences test transmissions in monochrome.
- 16 September: TCN-9 Sydney launches at 7.00pm. Announcer John Godson is the first voice heard and Bruce Gyngell is the first person seen in-vision, introducing This is Television.
- 27 October: TCN-9 officially opens.
- 4 November: HSV-7 Melbourne officially launches.
- 5 November: The Australian Broadcasting Commission begins television broadcasting with ABN-2 Sydney.
- 19 November: ABV-2 Melbourne launches
- 22 November: 1956 Summer Olympics in Melbourne commence, televised by ABV-2 & HSV-7 and during GTV-9 test transmissions.
- 2 December: ATN-7 officially opens.

1957

- 19 January: Sir Dallas Brookes officially inaugurates GTV-9 Melbourne.
- 6 May: GTV-9 launches the nightly variety show In Melbourne Tonight with Graham Kennedy.

1959

- 9 January: Melbourne and Sydney are linked by microwave for the first time, allowing programs to be broadcast live to both cities concurrently.
- 1 July: Mr. Squiggle and Friends begins on ABC.
- 16 August: QTQ-9 Brisbane begins transmission.
- 5 September: NWS-9 Adelaide officially launches.
- 16 October: TVW-7 Perth launches.
- 24 October: ADS-7 Adelaide launches.
- 1 November: BTQ-7 Brisbane launches.
- 2 November: ABQ-2 Brisbane launches.

== 1960s ==
1960

- 11 March: ABS-2 Adelaide launches.
- 7 May: ABW-2 Perth begins transmission.
- 23 May: TVT-6 Hobart opens, bringing television to Tasmania.
- 4 June: ABT-2 Hobart commences broadcasting.

1961

- 19 August: Current affairs program Four Corners begins on ABC.
- 9 December: GLV-10 Traralgon is the first regional station to open.
- 23 December: BCV-8 launches in Bendigo while GMV-6 began in Shepparton.

1962

- 4 March: NBN-3 Newcastle begins broadcasting.
- 17 March: CBN-8 Orange launches.
- 18 March: WIN-4 Wollongong begins.
- 27 April: BTV-6 Ballarat begins transmission.
- 12 May: RTN-8 Lismore begins broadcasting.
- 26 May: TNT-9 begins transmission to Launceston and northern Tasmania.
- 2 June: CTC-7 Canberra officially commences transmissions.
- 1 July: Frank Packer (owner of TCN-9 Sydney) buys GTV-9 Melbourne, forming the National Television Network, the first in the country.
- 13 July: DDQ-10 Toowoomba begins transmission.
- 1 November: TNQ-7 launches in Townsville.
- 18 December: ABC-3 Canberra launches.

1963

- 7 September: RTQ-7 Rockhampton begins broadcasting.

1964

- 19 June: RVN-2 Wagga Wagga launches.
- 1 August: ATV-0, Melbourne's third commercial station, launches.
- 7 September: AMV-4 Albury commences broadcasting.

1965

- 23 January: NRN-11 Coffs Harbour begins broadcasting.
- 5 April: TEN-10 Sydney begins transmission.
- 10 April: WBQ-8 Wide Bay/Maryborough and NEN-9 Tamworth begin transmission.
- 12 May: NRN-11 Coffs Harbour begins broadcasting.
- 12 June: STW-9 Perth opens.
- 1 July: TVQ-0 Brisbane launches.
- 26 July: SAS-10 Adelaide launches.
- 27 September: NEN-9 Tamworth begins transmission.
- 27 November: STV-8 Mildura launches.
- 1 December: Australia's first regional television network is formed when CWN-6 Dubbo opens as a direct relay of CBN-8 Orange.
- 15 December: MTN-9 Griffith commences transmission.

1966

- 25 March: SES-8 Mount Gambier officially launches.
- 18 July: Play School begins on ABC
- 27 May: ECN-8 Taree launches.
- 7 September: FNQ-10 begins transmission in and around Cairns.

1967

- 10 March: BTW-3 Bunbury becomes the first regional television station in Western Australia.
- 10 April: ABC TV current affairs program This Day Tonight premieres.
- 15 June: Test colour television transmissions are made for the first time in Australia by ATV-0.

1968

- TVW-7 conducts its first Telethon.
- 1 March: GTS-4 Port Pirie launches.
- 9 August: MVQ-6 launches in Mackay.
- 16 August: BKN-7 Broken Hill opens.

1969

- 20 July: The Apollo 11 Moon landing is televised live by television stations in Australia.
- Undated: First fully colour capable production facility opened in Sydney (Video Tape Corp, in East Roseville).

== 1970s ==
1971

- 4 January: Long running US children's educational series Sesame Street begins on ABC.
- 18 June: VEW-8 Kalgoorlie begins broadcasting.
- 13 August: ABD-6 launches as Darwin's first television station.
- 11 September: ITQ-8 Mount Isa begins broadcasting.
- 9 October: Hey Hey It's Saturday starts off as a Saturday morning cartoon program for children on Nine Network.
- 22 November: A Current Affair, hosted by Mike Willesee, makes its first appearance on the Nine Network.
- 11 November: NTD-8 is officially launched by Administrator of the Northern Territory, Fred Chaney.

1972

- 13 March: Soap opera Number 96 debuts, heralding the night 'Australian television lost its virginity'
- 20 March: Brisbane channel BTQ-7 claims Australia's first one-hour news bulletin, The Big News

1973

- In 1973, the only Australian designed and made precision colour television monitor, was produced for local use and international export. The broadcast quality monitor (LDN5006) was developed by Willem Sparrius, Project Engineer at Philips subsidiary company Electronics Engineering Communications and produced at their South Oakleigh plant.

1974

- 29 August: GSW-9 Albany begins broadcasting as a relay of VEW-8 Kalgoorlie.
- October: Colour test transmissions begin on Australian television.
- 8 November: Countdown begins on ABC.

1975

- 1 March: At midnight, colour television is introduced across the country. The main networks celebrate with their own unique slogan – Come to Colour (ABC TV), Seven Colors Your World (Seven Network), Living Color (Nine Network) and 0 – First in Color (0-10 Network).

1976

- 26 November: RTS-5A Loxton launches in the Riverland district.

1977

- 21 January: GTW-11 Geraldton begins broadcasting, completing the roll-out of regional commercial television across Australia.
- 24 September: The Victorian Football League Grand Final is broadcast live to viewers in Melbourne for the first time.

1979

- 11 February: Current affairs program 60 Minutes debuts on the Nine Network.
- 7 April: The Special Broadcasting Service begins test transmissions on ABV-2 Melbourne and ABN-2 Sydney, with foreign-language programming shown on Sunday mornings.

== 1980s ==
1980

- 20 January: Melbourne's ATV-0 converts to ATV-10; after nearby La Trobe Valley regional station GLV-10 converts to GLV-8 to facilitate this change, which concurrently frees up the frequency for Channel 0/28 later that same year.
- 14 July: Game show Sale of the Century debuts on the Nine Network.
- 24 October: Channel 0/28 is launched by Bruce Gyngell in Sydney and Melbourne.

1982

- 28 June: The Nine Network Australia premieres Today.

1983

- 1 July: The Australian Broadcasting Commission becomes the Australian Broadcasting Corporation.
- 16 October: Channel 0/28 expands into Canberra, Cooma and Goulburn, and changes its name to Network 0-28.

1984

- 4 February: Hey Hey It's Saturday moves from its morning timeslot to the 9.30 pm timeslot.
- July: The 1984 Summer Olympics are broadcast on Network Ten.
- 26 July: US-French-Canadian animated series Inspector Gadget begins on ABC.

1985

- 18 February: Network 0-28 once again changes its name to SBS, and begins daytime transmissions.
- 4 March: ABC National, a one-hour national news and current affairs program shown from 6.30 pm, replaces ABC TV's half-hour 7.00pm state news bulletins.
- 18 March: Soap opera Neighbours begins on the Seven Network.
- 30 June: SBS Television expands into Brisbane, Adelaide, Newcastle, Wollongong, and the Gold Coast.
- 24 October: The ABC Board elects to abandon ABC National.

1986

- 5 January: SBS Television phases out its second VHF 0 channel.
- 16 March: SBS launches in Perth and Hobart.
- 19 August: Treasurer Paul Keating, in his budget speech, announces the amalgamation of the ABC and SBS.

1987

- 26 March: Bob Hawke calls off the proposed amalgamation of the ABC and SBS.
- 17 April: Rage begins on ABC.
- 27 December: Adelaide stations SAS-10 and ADS-7 swap frequencies to become SAS-7 and ADS-10.

1988

- 1 January: Nine Network first use of SNG (Satellite News Gathering) in Australia. Transmission from Kingoonya SA for Australia Live 88 which showcased Australia remotely in a four hour broadcast.
- 2 January: Imparja Television launches in remote eastern and central Australia from studios in Alice Springs.
- 17 January: Home and Away premieres on the Seven Network as a two-hour pilot and begins as a regular weeknight soap opera the following evening.
- 20 May: NEW-10 launches in Perth.
- 10 September: TVQ-0 Brisbane becomes TVQ-10.

1989

- 31 March: Aggregation begins in southern New South Wales.

== 1990s ==
1990

- Imparja Television begins producing 15-minute local news bulletins inserted into its National Nine News simulcast, entitled Imparja Local News.
- 27 January: Long running children's wrapper program Saturday Disney which airs television shows from The Walt Disney Company begins on Seven Network.
- 3 September: Children's TV series Johnson and Friends begins on ABC.
- 21 December: James Valentine leaves The Afternoon Show after his final day of presenting the weekday afternoon magazine program.
- 24 December: WIN Television purchases Network Ten affiliate-to-be Star Television and switches its affiliation to the Nine Network for Queensland.
- 31 December: Regional Queensland is aggregated.

1991

- 10 February: US animated comedy series The Simpsons begins on Network Ten.
- 14 June: SBS TV is permitted by the government to broadcast five minutes of advertising per hour, as a form of additional funding.
- 31 December: Northern New South Wales is aggregated.

1992

- 1 January: Aggregation begins to take place in Victoria.
- 3 February: Midday news program The World at Noon is launched on ABC TV.
- 3 February: Former Europe correspondent for the ABC Ian Henderson takes over as newsreader for the 7.00 pm weeknights ABC News in Victoria.
- 8 May: An educational television series for children called Lift Off begins being broadcast on ABC every Friday afternoon at 2:00pm. The show will later air on weekdays at 4:30pm on 29 June and on Saturday evenings at 6:00pm on 19 September.
- 20 July: Children's TV series Bananas in Pyjamas begins on ABC.
- 27 November: Parliament passes a bill permitting the ABC to provide subscription television services.

1993

- 26 January: Early morning news program First Edition begins on the ABC.
- 17 February: The ABC's Australia Television International is launched by Prime Minister of Australia's Paul John Keating.
- September: The Victorian arm of the Southern Cross Network changes its name to SCN.

1994

- Southern Cross Broadcasting purchases Canberra-based station Capital Television.
- 20 May: Darwin is the last capital city to begin receiving SBS.
- 30 April: Tasmania is aggregated, as a two-station market.
- 31 July: Community station Briz 31 commences transmission.
- October: WIN Television expands into Victoria and Tasmania, purchasing ENT Limited, owners of TasTV and Vic Television.
- 6 October: Community station C31 Melbourne launches.

1995

- 26 January: Galaxy launches Australia's first subscription television service on MMDS.
- 19 September: Australia's first cable TV provider, Optus Vision, begins broadcasting.
- 22 October: Foxtel was founded and introduced into Australia.
- 4 December: State editions of The 7.30 Report are merged into a single national program, presented from Sydney by Kerry O'Brien.

1996

- Prime Television expands into Mildura as PTV-31, after being granted the area's second commercial licence.
- December: Prime Television purchases the Golden West Network for $71 million.

1997

- 8 July: Ownership of Australia Television International moves from the Australian Broadcasting Corporation to the Seven Network.
- December: Prime Television Limited purchases Canal 9 in Argentina.

1998

- 16 February: UK children's television series Teletubbies begins on ABC.
- 27 March: TND-34 Darwin, a Seven Network affiliate, is officially inaugurated by Chief Minister of the Northern Territory, Shane Stone.
- 10 May: Drama SeaChange begins on ABC.
- 1 July: The WIN Corporation acquires MTN-9 Griffith and supplementary licence AMN-31.
- 31 July: The Wiggles' television show is launched on Seven Network.
- 30 August: Prime Television New Zealand is launched, owned by Prime Television's parent company Prime Television Limited.
- 28 September: Pokémon begins on Network Ten.
- 20 December: The Disney Channel Australia premieres a TV special: The Wiggles Live at Disneyland to launch The Wiggles' debut.

1999

- 26 March: WOW, regional Western Australia's second commercial television network owned by WIN Television, launches.
- 18 June: Perth community station Access 31 officially commences transmission.
- 15 August: WIN South Australia is established following the buyout SES-8 Mount Gambier and RTS-5A Loxton by WIN Corporation.
- 31 December: ABC is the Australian broadcaster of the global television event 2000 Today.

== 2000s ==
2000

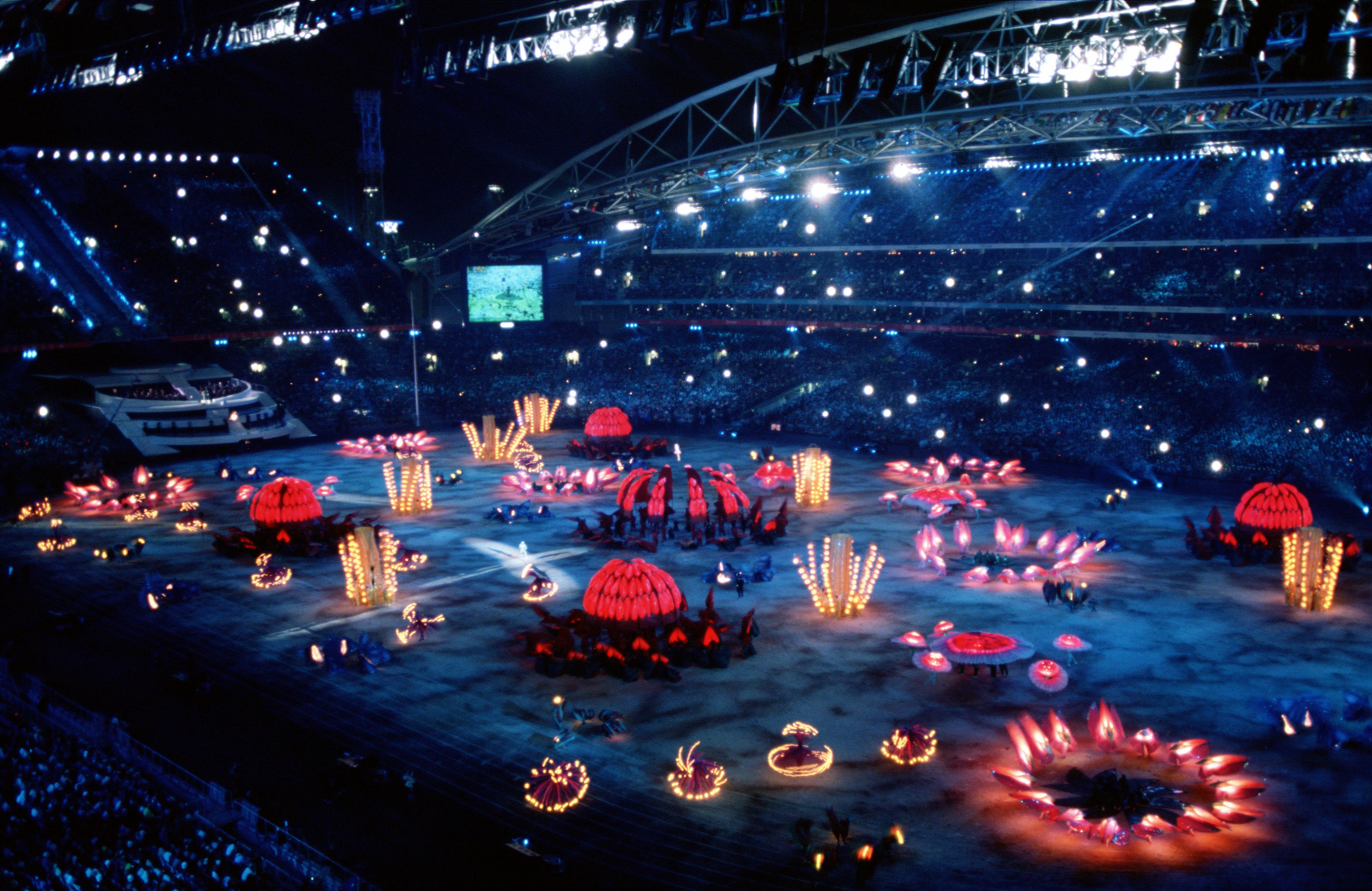
The Sydney 2000 Summer Olympics opening ceremony becomes one of the highest-rating programs in Australian television history.

- 15 September: The 2000 Summer Olympics Opening Ceremony is broadcast by the Seven Network – one of the highest-rating programs ever shown on Australian television.

2001

- 1 January: Digital terrestrial television is introduced to audiences in Sydney, Melbourne, Brisbane, Adelaide and Perth.
- 8 June: Prime Television axes local news services in Canberra, Wollongong and Newcastle.
- 4 September: Southern Cross Broadcasting acquires Telecasters Australia, gaining control of Ten Queensland, Ten Northern NSW, Seven Darwin and Seven Central.
- 1 August: ABC Television launches its first digital-only multichannel, ABC Kids.
- 1 November: Fly TV launches, sharing bandwidth with ABC Kids.
- 22 November: Ten Capital's local news bulletin, Ten Capital News, is axed.

2002

- 18 February: Prime Television New Zealand and Publishing and Broadcasting Limited form a partnership for the supply of Nine Network programming to the New Zealand network.
- 1 April: Southern Cross Broadcasting acquires Spencer Gulf Telecasters, gaining control of Central GTS/BKN in parts of regional South Australia and Broken Hill.
- 22 June: The SBS World News Channel is officially launched by the Minister for Communications, Information Technology and the Arts, Senator Richard Alston.

2003

- Unknown Date: The Wiggles Movie (1997 Version) is recorded on Channel 7. This is because earlier in 1998, it launched as a TV series. The TV series of The Wiggles is currently on DVD.
- 22 May: The Australian Broadcasting Corporation decides to close the ABC Kids and Fly TV channels.
- 22 December: Tasmanian Digital Television, a Network Ten affiliate, launches.

2004

- 17 March: Trial datacast service Digital Forty Four begins in Sydney.
- 23 April: Community station C31 Adelaide launches.
- 18 July: Senator Helen Coonan becomes the Minister for Communications, Information Technology and the Arts.

2005

- 7 March: ABC2 launches with an episode of Landline at 6.35 am.
- 10 March: ABC2 is officially inaugurated by Senator Helen Coonan, at the Australian Parliament House in Canberra.
- 1 July: The Australian Broadcasting Authority and Australian Communications Authority are replaced by the Australian Communications and Media Authority.
- 21 November: Community station Television Sydney commences broadcasting.
- 12 December: The Australian Government renews ABC Television's contract to manage the Asia Pacific television service for five years, providing A$100 million in funding.

2006

- 1 January: Mildura Digital Television, a Network Ten affiliate, launches.
- 8 February: Prime Television Limited sells Prime Television New Zealand to Sky Television for NZ$30 million.
- 18 July: Play School celebrates 40 years
- 16 September: Australian Television's 50th anniversary.

2007

- 13 March: Channels are reserved for the introduction of digital television to remote areas such as Alice Springs, Mount Isa, and regional Western Australia.
- 28 March: The Australian Communications and Media Authority extends Digital Forty Four's trial datacast licence.
- 18 May: ACMA grants a licence to Darwin Digital Television, owned by PBL Media and Southern Cross Broadcasting.
- 30 May: Southern Cross Broadcasting announces the sale of Adelaide station NWS-9 to WIN Television for $105 million.
- 8 June: WIN Television completes its takeover of STW-9 Perth for $163.1 million.
- 13 June: C31 Adelaide's trial licence is extended for a further twelve months.
- 13 July: National Indigenous Television launches as Australia's 'third public broadcaster'.
- 14 September: Network Ten announces Ten HD.
- 15 September: The Seven Media Group announces a high definition multichannel, to be launched in December 2007.
- 23 September: The Australian Government proposes a new children's multichannel, ABC3.
- 15 October: The Seven Media Group launch 7HD, a high definition multichannel.
- 16 December: Network Ten launches Ten HD, a high definition multichannel.
- 18 December: Minister for Communications, Stephen Conroy announces switch-off of analogue television signals will take place between 2010 and 2013.

2008

- 1 January: ABC TV becomes ABC1 and changes its logo along with ABC2.
- 17 March: The Nine Network launches its new high definition multichannel, 9HD.
- 28 April: Darwin Digital Television, a Network Ten affiliate, is launched.
- 7 May: SBS TV changes its logo and its on-air look and along with it comes a new slogan – "Six Billion Stories and Counting" and SBS HD become 720p.
- 3 August: Nine airs the last ever edition of long-running Canberra-based political program, Sunday after 27 years.
- 8–24 August: SBS TV partners up with the Seven Network for joint coverage of the Beijing 2008 Olympic Games.
- 20 October: Nine relaunches National Nine News as Nine News.
- 24 November: Freeview Australia is launched across Australia at 6:29pm

2009

- 26 March: One HD launches – the first commercial digital-only network in Australia.
- 3 May: Nine launches The Morning News Hour and The Late News (renamed Nightline)
- 1 June: SBS TV becomes SBS ONE and SBS TWO launches on digital television.
- 9 August: GO! launches on Channel 99 in Nine-owned areas and Channel 88 in WIN/NBN areas.
- 1 November: 7TWO launches on Channel 72 in Seven-owned areas.
- 4 December: ABC3 launches on Channel 23. ABC for Kids on 2, a block on ABC2 from 9am (on weekends, 6am) to 6pm, launches.

== 2010s ==
2010

- 1 March: Television Sydney commences digital broadcasting on Channel 44.
- 10 April: Digital-only community station West TV launches in Perth, replacing Access 31.
- 28 May: C31 Melbourne commences digital broadcasting on Channel 44.
- 7 June: 31 Brisbane commences digital broadcasting on Channel 44.
- 10 June: West Digital Television, a Network Ten affiliate, commences digital broadcasting in Western Australia.
- 30 June: History is made, as Mildura/Sunraysia became the first region to shut down analogue tv.
- 22 July: ABC News 24 launches on channel 24 by the ABC as Australia's first free-to-air English news channel. (SBS originally had an international news channel)
- 25 September: 7mate launches on Channel 73 by the Seven Network, replacing 7HD on Channel 73 in Seven-owned areas and 63 in Prime areas. 7TWO changed its theme to a Best of British-oriented format.
- 26 September: GEM launches on Channel 90 in Nine-owned areas and Channel 80 in WIN/NBN areas replacing 9HD, two days late due to technical issues.
- 5 November: C31 Adelaide launches digital broadcasting on Channel 44 as 44 Adelaide, as allocated to all metropolitan community television services.
- 1 December: WIN Television commences broadcast of Network Ten in the Murrumbidgee Irrigation Area.
- 10 December: Viewer Access Satellite Television launches for NSW, VIC, QLD, SA, TAS and NT, for viewers who cannot get TV Reception from their transmitters.

2011

- 11 January: Eleven launches on Channel 11 in Metro and Channel 55 in Regional areas.
- 16 January: The Big Red "7" logo expands to Prime & GWN as names Prime7 and GWN7
- 2 May: Central Digital Television, a Network Ten affiliate, commences digital broadcasting in remote areas. ABC for Kids on 2 rebrands as ABC4 Kids, and expands its time to 6am to 7pm.
- 8 May: One HD rebrands as One, launching the format with entertainment targeting 25 to 54-year-old men.
- 18 July: Play School celebrates its 45-year anniversary.
- 28 July: The channels: 7TWO, GO!, GEM, One, Eleven & 7mate, became available in Albany/Bunbury.
- 16 September: Television in Australia celebrates its 55th anniversary.
- 18 September: Television 4 launches on Channel 64 in Prime areas.
- December: Television 4 rebrands as TV4ME and launches on Channel 74 in Seven-owned areas.
- 11 November – February 2012: 7TWO, GO!, GEM, One, Eleven & 7mate launches in Mount Gambier/Riverland.

2012

- 13 January: WIN Television commenced broadcasting of GEM, GO!, One, and Eleven in the Murrumbidgee Irrigation Area (MIA).
- 4 March: NBN Television (The first regional television station in NSW as NBN-3 Newcastle) celebrates broadcasting for 50 years to Newcastle and Northern NSW, from as far south as the Central Coast to as far north as the Gold Coast and as far west as Gunnedah.
- 26 March: Extra launches on Channel 94 in Eastern Seaboard Metro Markets and Channel 84 in the Northern NSW market.
- 20 April: WIN Television commenced broadcasting of 7mate in the Murrumbidgee Irrigation Area (MIA) on LCN 60.
- 1 May: WIN Gold launches on Channel 84 and Channel 94 in metropolitan areas Perth and Adelaide.
- 5 May: WIN Gold rebrands as Gold.
- 5 June: WIN Television commenced broadcasting of 7TWO in the Murrumbidgee Irrigation Area (MIA) on LCN 66.
- 24 September: Network Ten to commence broadcasting of datacasting channel TVSN on LCN 14.
- 27 November: Shutdown of analogue television services: Northern NSW
- 12 December: NITV commences free-to-air broadcast via SBS

2013

- Conversion from analogue to digital television is completed: Shutdown of analogue television services: Adelaide SA (2 April); Tasmania (9 April); Perth WA (16 April); Brisbane, Gold Coast, Sunshine Coast QLD (28 May); Regional and Remote WA (25 June); Darwin NT (30 July); Sydney, Central Coast NSW (3 December); Melbourne VIC, Remote Central and Eastern Australia (10 December).
- 1 April: SBS relaunches digital channel SBS TWO (SBS 2) with a focus on the under-40 age group.
- C31 Melbourne, C31 Adelaide, C31 Perth, C31 Brisbane, and TVS C31 Sydney goes to Digital 44.
- 13 July: Gold’s 5 hour timeshift channel, Gold 2 is launched on LCN 82 in WIN, VTV, Queensland and Tasmania WIN Channels.

2014

- 2 February: GO! changes its branding and logo to new ones.
- 7 July: ABC4 Kids expands its time to 5am to 7pm on ABC2.
- 20 July: ABC1 rebrands as ABC.

2015

- 2 March: ABC4 Kids rebrands as ABC Kids.
- 18 March: Neighbours celebrates 30 years.
- 5 July: SBS ONE rebrands as SBS.
- 29 August: Racing.com (A horse racing channel) launches on channel 78 in metro places and channel 68 in regional places.
- 17 November: Food Network (SBS's fourth channel featuring food shows) launches on Channel 33, replacing SBS 3.
- 26 November: 9Life launches on channel 94, along with a relaunch of 9HD on channel 90. GEM is renamed 9Gem and moved to channel 92 and GO! is renamed 9Go! and moved to channel 93 with the quality of 9Gem changed from HD to SD.
- 30 November: The Australian Communications & Media Authority introduced sweeping changes to the ratings system for commercial networks. Among them were allowing M and MA15+ programs to air an hour earlier then they were previously allowed, from 7:30 pm and 8:30 pm respectively, PG programmes can air all day, dissolving the AV15+ classification, as well as changes to when adverts with higher classifications program can air.

2016

- 19 January: Gold 2 shuts down and gets replaced by Extra in WIN Areas.
- 28 February: 7flix launches on channel 76.
- 1 March: NBN relaunches 9HD, as well as 9Life launching for NBN audiences.
- 1 March: WIN relaunches their version of 9HD, WIN HD. 9Life launches for WIN audiences.
- 2 March: Ten relaunches Ten HD and the quality of One changes from HD to SD. WIN also relaunches WIN HD and launches 9Life in some areas after technical issues on the previous day.
- 30 April: 4ME shuts down, being replaced by a simulcast of ishop tv (simulcast later removed in June).
- 10 May: Seven relaunches 7HD (HD simulcast of Seven in Melbourne and Adelaide, HD simulcast of 7mate in other markets) and the quality of 7mate changes from HD to SD.
- 1 July: Southern Cross Austereo switches affiliation from Network Ten to the Nine Network in Southern NSW, Australian Capital Territory, Regional Queensland, Regional Victoria and Tasmania.
- 1 July: WIN Television switches affiliation from the Nine Network to Network Ten in Southern NSW, Australian Capital Territory, Regional Queensland, Regional Victoria, Mildura, Regional WA, Tasmania and Eastern SA.
- 1 July: Extra on WIN Regions: Southern NSW, ACT, Regional Queensland, Regional Victoria, Mildura, Regional WA, Tasmania and Eastern SA and gets replaced by a placeholder with some music in the background, which is similar to Viewer Access Satellite Television scenic loop on Regional News Channels. The Channels Range as WIN on Channel 8, WIN HD on Channel 80, ONE on Channel 81, Eleven on Channel 82, TVSN on Channel 84 and GOLD on Channel 85.
- 17 July: 9Life relaunches in Southern NSW, Australian Capital Territory, Regional Queensland and Regional Victoria due to the affiliate swap.
- 18 July: Play School celebrates 50 years.
- 16 September: 60th anniversary of television in Australia.
- 19 September: ABC3 rebrands as ABC Me.
- 15 November: SBS 2 rebrands as SBS Viceland.
- 6 December: ABC relaunches ABC HD and the quality of ABC News 24 changes from HD to SD.

2017

- 1 January: ABC Kids expands its time to 5am to 7.30pm, ABC2 also expands its time to 7:30pm to 2am.
- 23 March: Southern Cross Television relaunches a high definition simulcast of their main channel, Southern Cross HD, in Tasmania on channel 60.
- 8 April: SBS launches a high definition simulcast of SBS Viceland on channel 31.
- 10 April: ABC News 24 rebrands as ABC News.
- 17 April: Rage celebrates 30 years.
- 31 May: WIN Television purchases NRN from Southern Cross.
- 1 July: On the WIN Network, music got replaced by a voiceover.
- 4 December: ABC2 rebrands as ABC Comedy.

2018

- 2 September: Sky News on WIN (now Sky News Regional) was launched on free-to-air TV in regional Australia.
- 1 October: Your Money launches to be broadcast on channel 95/85.
- 31 October: Network 10 launches a major network branding. Channel Ten becomes Channel 10, while multichannels ONE and ELEVEN are rebranded as 10 Boss (later renamed to 10 Bold) and 10 Peach respectively.
- 17 November: Food Network rebrands to SBS Food.
- 1 December: 7food network launches on channel 74.

2019

- 8 February: The Nine Network, the Seven Network, Network 10 and SBS along with regional networks Prime7, GWN7, WIN Television, NBN Television stopped using full-screen and voiced-over classification warning boards before the beginning of a program. However, ABC continues to use full-screen and voiced-over boards before the start of a program., now showing classifications at the very start of the show/movie instead.
- 17 May: Your Money ceases to broadcast on channel 95/85.
- June: 9Gem HD launches on the space vacated by Your Money; in Darwin on 14 June; in Adelaide, Brisbane and Perth on 20 June; and in Sydney and Melbourne on 21 June.
- 20 June: WIN Television axes four local news bulletins, which were, the Central West, Riverina, Border North East (Albury–Wodonga) and the Wide Bay because of insufficient commercial viability to fund those regional news operations.

== 2020s ==
2020

- 16 January: Seven launches a high definition simulcast of 7mate on channel 74.
- 5 April: 9Rush launches on channel 96.
- 27 September: 10 Shake launches on channel 13.

2021

- 1 January: ABC Comedy rebrands as ABC TV Plus, returning to its general entertainment format.
- 1 July: Southern Cross Austereo switches affiliation back to Network Ten from the Nine Network in most markets.
- 1 July: WIN Television switches affiliation back to the Nine Network from Network Ten in most markets. (excluding NRN)
- 18 July: Play School celebrates 55 years.
- 16 September: 65th anniversary of television in Australia.

2022

- 28 July: The final episode of Neighbours goes to air on Network 10 and 10 Peach.

2023

- 15 January: 7Bravo launches on channel 75.
- 12 April: Southern Cross Austereo-owned GTS/BKN cancels its long-running regional news service effectively immediately. ending over 50 years of news operations for the Spencer Gulf and Broken Hill regions
- 1 August: 10 Shake rebrands as Nickelodeon.
- 16 August: 11.15 million people nationwide view the semi-final of the World Cup between Australia's Matildas and England's Lionesses.

2024

- 3 June: ABC TV Plus rebrands to ABC Family, ABC Me rebrands to ABC Entertains.
- 12 June: 10 Bold rebranded to 10 Bold Drama, 10 Peach rebranded to 10 Peach Comedy.
- 6 October: C31 Melbourne celebrates 30 years of community TV broadcasting.

2025

- 18 March: Neighbours celebrates 40 years.
- 1 July: 10 Peach Comedy and 10 Bold Drama were both replaced by ‘10 Comedy’ and ‘10 Drama’ to embrace their real genres of their channels.
- 11 August: Southern Cross Austereo owned Tasmania cancels its long-running regional news service effectively immediately, ending over 50 years of news operations for the Tasmania region.
- 22 October: Foxtel celebrates 30 years.

2026

- 7 January: Seven West Media merges with Southern Cross Media.
- 18 July: Play School celebrates 60 years.
- 16 September: 70th anniversary of television in Australia.

2027

- 17 April: Rage celebrates 40 years.
