= RMITV =

Student television station at RMIT University in Australia

- Type: Community Television
- Country: Australia
- Availability: C31, TVS, C44, 31 Digital, WTV
- Founded: 1987
- Headquarters: RMIT University, Level 3, Building 12, Room 97, 402 Swanston Street, Melbourne, Victoria
- Launch date: 1987
- Official website: www.rmitv.org
- Language: English

RMITV is a not-for-profit, community access television production facility based at RMIT University City Campus in Melbourne, Australia. It is a full member of the Melbourne Community Television Consortium, a not-for-profit consortium that operates the community access channel C31 which broadcasts throughout Melbourne and Geelong.

== About ==
RMITV is a student run media production house based within RMIT University, with the majority of its funding granted by RMIT University Student Union (RUSU). RMITV is dedicated to providing hands on television experience to students. RMITV also produces content to be broadcast, most commonly on C31 Melbourne and have helped many students find their way to careers in the television industry. Although based at RMIT University in Melbourne, they also work to provide opportunities to members of the local community wanting to get involved in television production.

== Logo ==
Designed by RMITV member Nic Mason in the early 2000s, the "R" and "M" in RMITV's logo are based on the series of classification marks from the OFLC used to designate "Restricted" and "Mature" broadcast content and the "I" and "TV" are based on the 'General' (G) and 'Parental Guidance' (PG) classification marks but making use of different letters and antennas on the TV to signify television

== History ==
RMITV is one of the oldest community television organisations in Australia, having been involved in lobbying the government for community access to the television spectrum. It transmitted its first test broadcast in 1987.

Early on RMITV struggled with licences for television spectrum. After originally lobbying for a public licence, similar to those seen in the American public television sector, RMITV was knocked back as public licences are not available in Australia. They were then granted a licence to broadcast to private audiences in a 10 km radius of the RMIT City Campus. The license was granted on the 09/08/1987. A week after a Channel 10 news report by Mal Walden about RMITV's upcoming open day 1987 broadcast the licence was cancelled.

The first licence was a General Licence Class D (Section 24). The Licence number was 211744/2. The callsign was VH3BVK.

RMITV was also responsible for broadcasting ETV, a closed-circuit television system operated at the RMIT Campus in previous years.

The government encouraged Melbourne's many aspirant community television broadcasters to form an umbrella organisation to apply for a broadcasting license, and so RMITV became a founding member of the Melbourne Community Television Consortium; the license holder for Melbourne's Channel 31.

RMITV has a long history of successful producers and practitioners moving into professional employment within the Australian television industry. Most notable alumni include: Waleed Aly (The Project), Rove McManus (Roving Enterprises), Hamish and Andy (Fox FM), Shona Devlin (JTV – Triple J), Tommy Little (This Week Live), Dave Thornton (This Week Live), Peter Helliar and many more. RMITV has also had many crew members go on to work at the ABC, Network 10, Videoworks and Staging Connections.

RMITV's Productions are not only limited to C31, many of RMITV's productions air on community stations all around Australia. For example, Live on Bowen (2012–2015) which were broadcast on C31, Face Television - Sky Channel 083 (New Zealand), WTV (Perth) and 31 Digital (South East Queensland), The Inquiry (2009-2010), In Pit Lane (1998–present) and 31 Questions (2012–2014).

Throughout its time RMITV has produced some of the most well known programs on Australian community television, including: The Loft Live, Under Melbourne Tonight, Chartbusting 80's, Raucous, Dawns Crack, PLUCK, Studio A, The Leak and countless outside broadcasts.

Mid-2015 spawned a webseries collaboration between RMITV and Catalyst, RMIT's Student Magazine, entitled "Politics at the Belleville". Based on the podcast "Politics on the Couch" the program was hosted by the same talent and was released every Friday afternoon.

== Internal structure ==
RMITV is an RMIT Student Union department, with close ties to the not-for-profit incorporated organisation, Student Community Television Inc.. For most operational purposes, both RMITV and Student Community Television Inc. share a common Board of Directors, and management team.

The group employs five part-time staff members to look after the organisation and membership- a General Manager, Marketing Manager, Content Manager, Technical Manager and Training Manager. A large number of others look after the management of the organisation in volunteer roles.

Additionally, Student Community Television Inc. is a paid full member of the MCTC which provides them with free airtime on C31 Melbourne and representation on the MCTC assembly.

== See also ==
- Television broadcasting in Australia
