= River to Reef =

River to Reef was a fishing, boating and lifestyle show on Australian television. The series was created by producer Phillip Lennox Harris owner of the Lennox Media Group. From 2003 to 2005 the first 97 episodes were hosted by Melbourne radio personality Glenn Knight. The series screened in Australia on the Seven Network channels 7HD and 7Mate as well as Foxtel Aurora Community Channel. In the final 7 years it was presented by Theo Rozakis, Robby Nethercote with celebrity Paul Mercurio joining the cast in the final season. Each week a number of segments were presented on topics such as fishing, boating and marine lifestyle with the series shot mostly in Australia. Other series were filmed in Indonesia, Vanuatu and later New Zealand.

The series first screened on community channels C31 Melbourne. 31 Digital Brisbane, Channel 44 Adelaide and Channel 31 Perth. It later began screening on regional channel 10 Southern Cross TEN in all regional markets then on Foxtel Aurora Community Channel and the Network TEN owned OneHD.

River To Reef was distributed into 40 other mostly non English speaking countries. The show ceased production in 2018 with the producer citing "the market had become too over crowded with 18 fishing shows on air all vying for sponsorship money from the same relatively small marine market".
