= The Bazura Project =

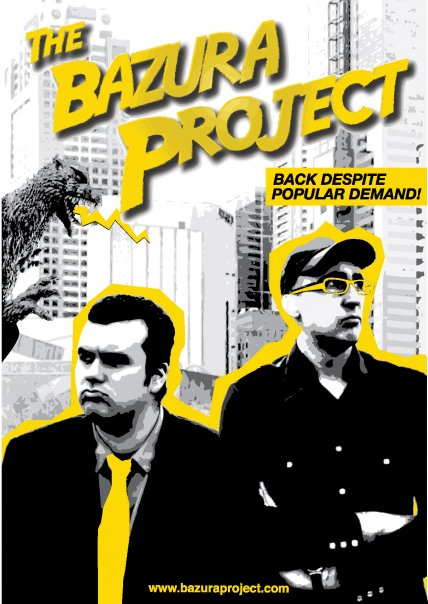
- Season 3 poster
- Starring: Shannon Marinko; Lee Zachariah
- Opening theme: "In the Hall of the Mountain King" by Edvard Grieg
- Country of origin: Australia
- No. of episodes: 42

Production
- Running time: 30 mins. (approx)

Original release
- Network: Channel 31 (2006–2008); ABC2 (2011)
- Release: 7 December 2006

The Bazura Project is a comedy show about the history of cinema, written and presented by Shannon Marinko and Lee Zachariah. It originally ran on Australian community television from 2006 to 2008, and on ABC2 in late 2011.

In 2025, The Bazura Project was inducted into the Community TV Hall of Fame.

== On Australian Community TV ==
The show originally aired on Australian community television stations (Channel 31 Melbourne, 31 Brisbane, Television Sydney and C31 Adelaide) on 7 December 2006. It ran for three seasons, ending on 18 December 2008.

It was nominated for multiple Antenna Awards, and won Best Comedy Program and Best Director in 2007, and Best Arts Program in both 2007 and 2008.

Every episode began with a pre-title sequence in which hosts Shannon Marinko and Lee Zachariah parodied a classic film scene. There would then be a news segment, a feature story (either informational or a comedic sketch), an interview with a key figure movie figure, then reviews of that week's releases.

=== Opening Sequences ===
These sequences are not strictly parodies, but rather hosts Shannon and Lee finding themselves in situations that closely resemble famous scenes. Notable openings included the season one finale The Graduate (in which the wedding is attended by all the characters from the previous opening sequences), season two's On the Town (in which Marinko and Zachariah "sung" New York, New York with lyrics pertaining to the Melbourne International Film Festival), the season two finale Back to the Future Part II (in which they travelled back through time, appearing in that season's previous opening sequences), Plan 9 from Outer Space (featuring one of the final on-screen appearances of legendary Australian actor Bud Tingwell), Full Metal Jacket (in which their heads were shaved on-screen), and the series finale Fight Club (in which, rather than doing a single scene, the entire film was acted out).

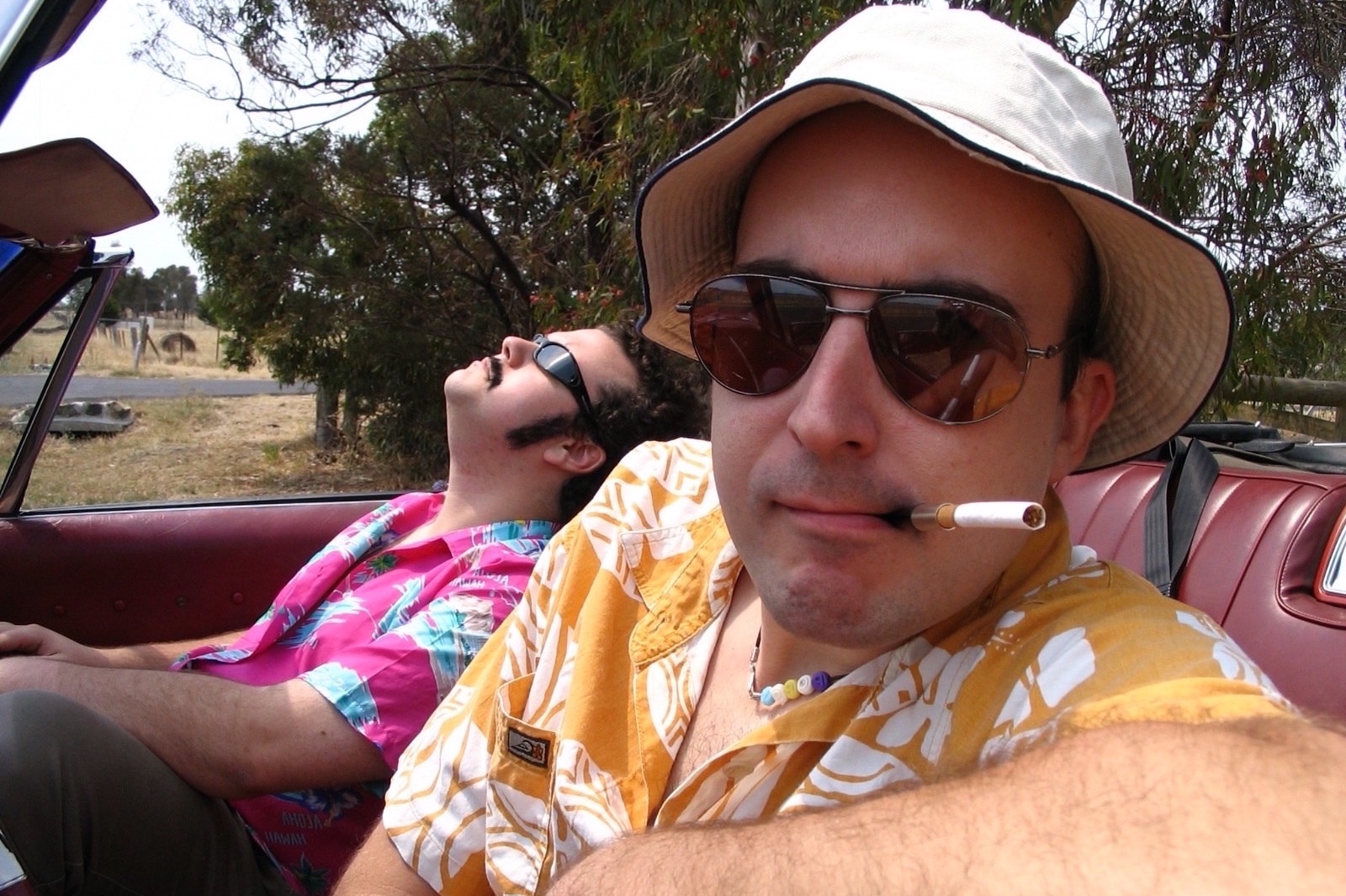

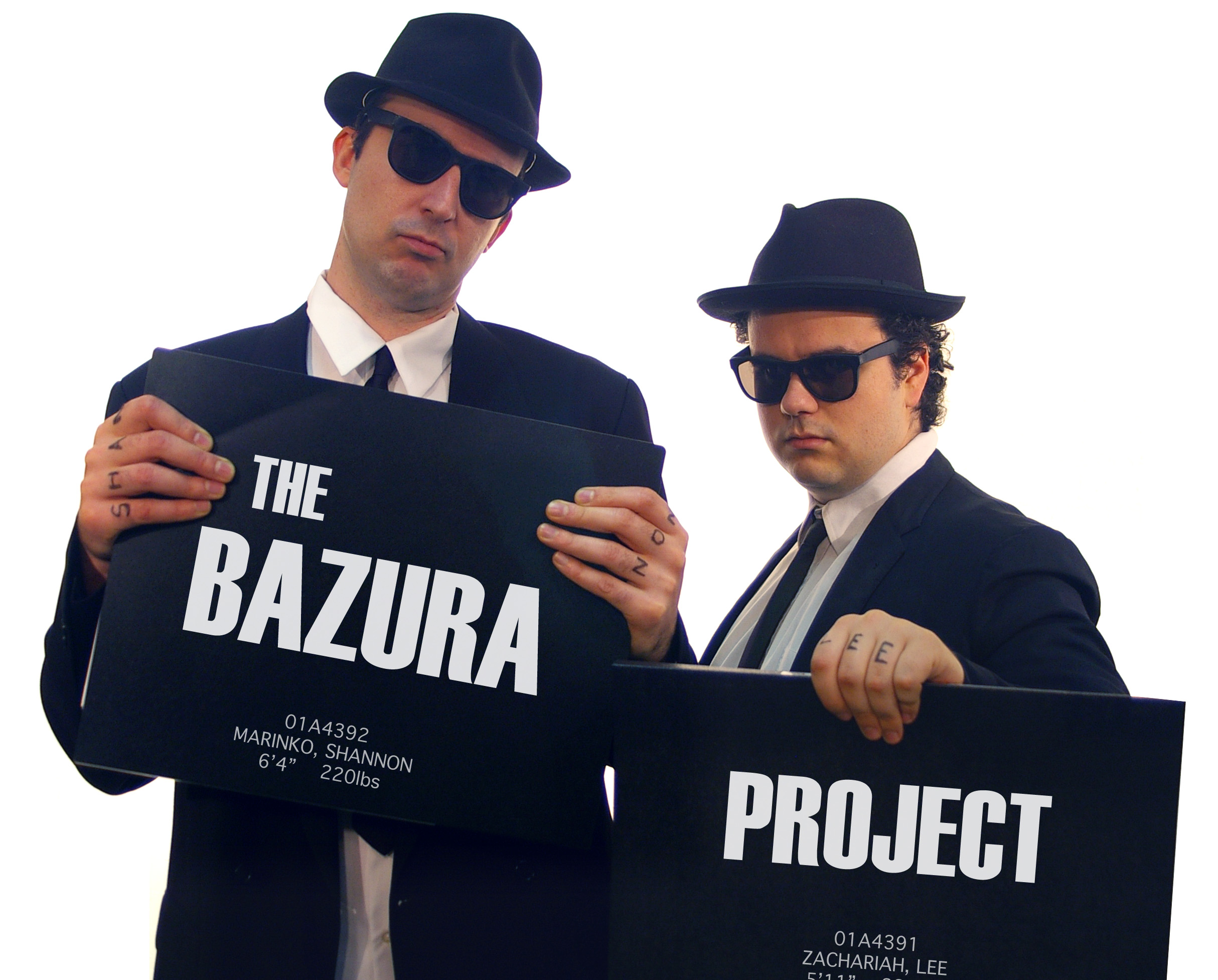

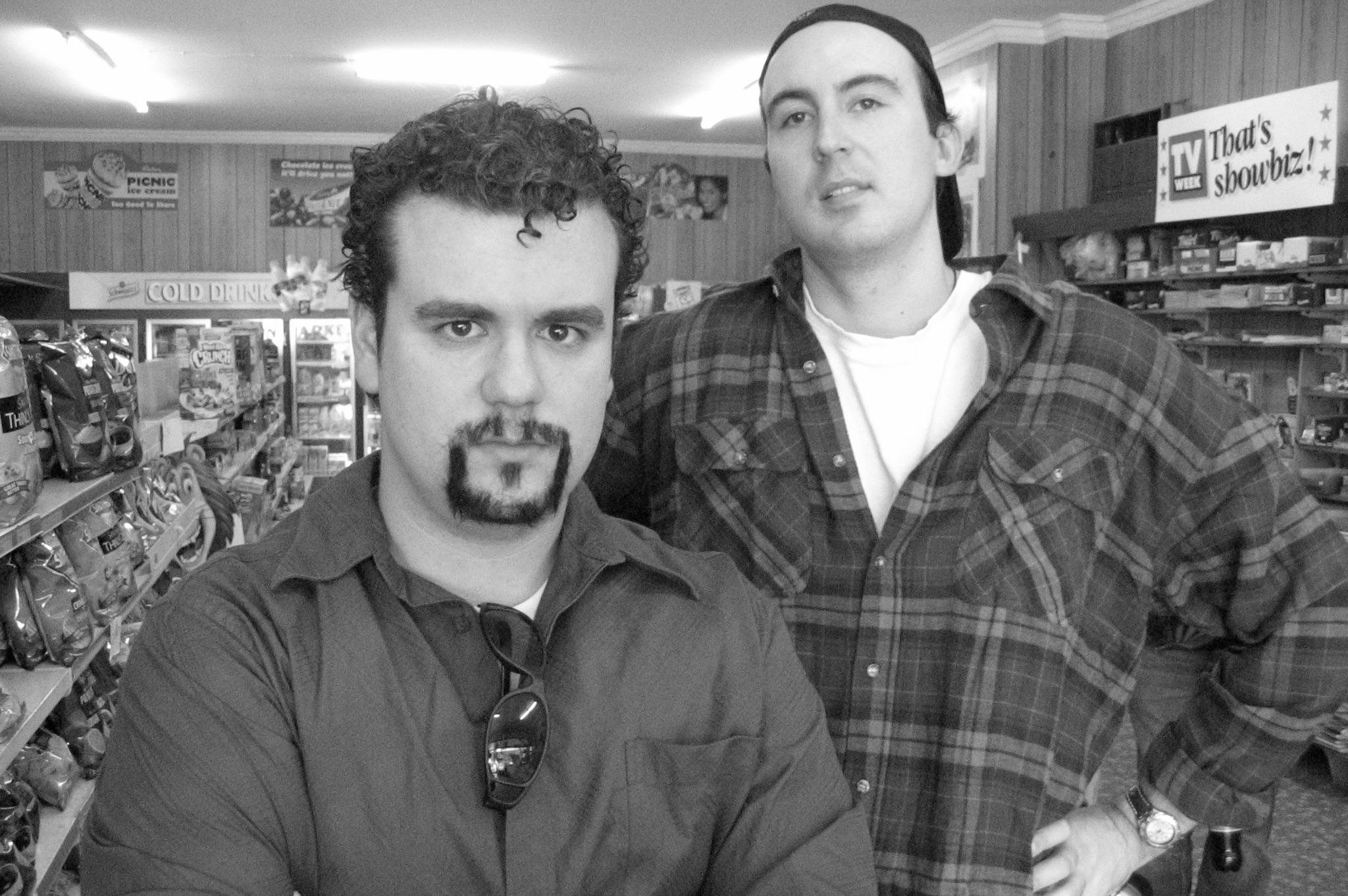

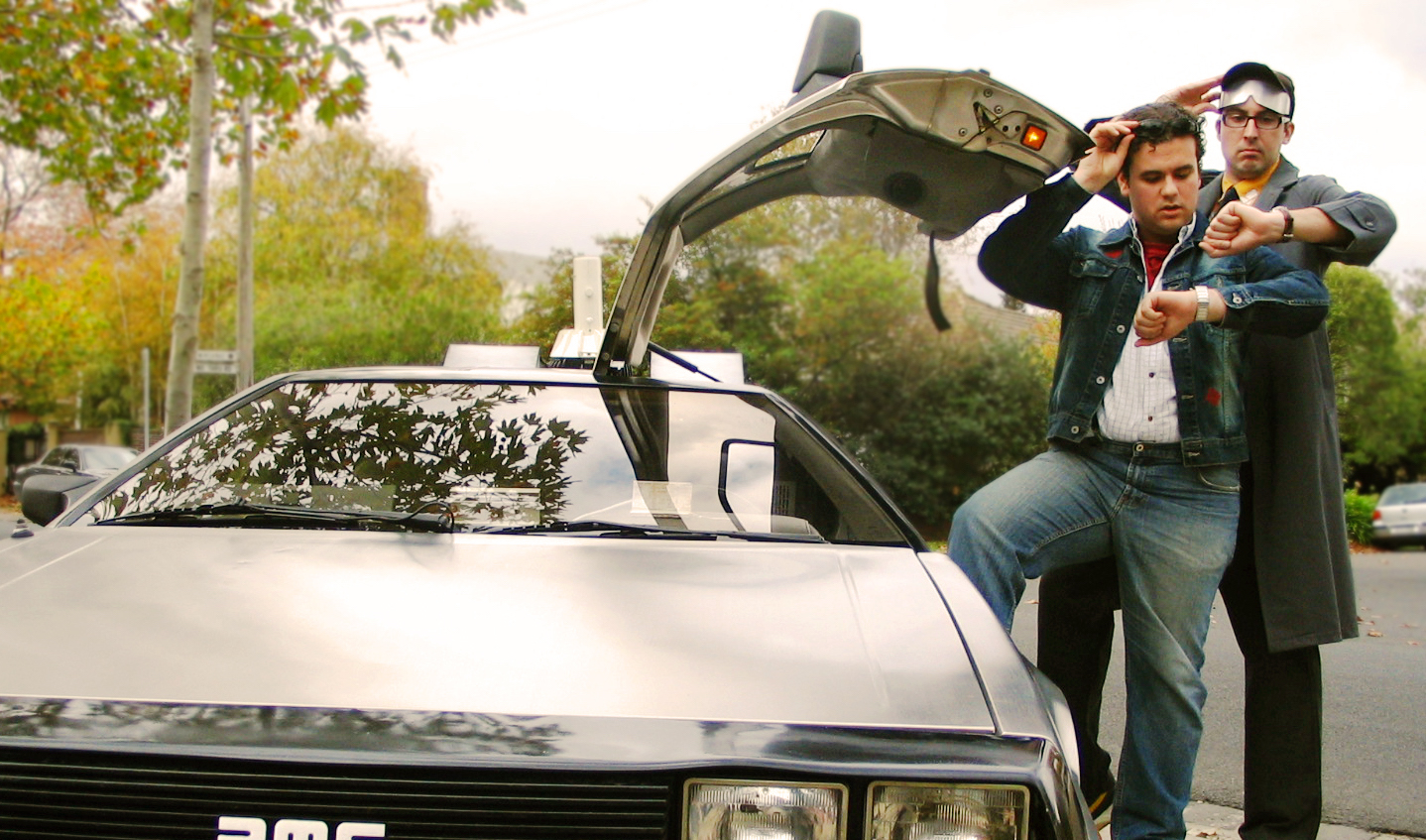

Episode 1.01 (7 December 2006) – The Sixth Sense
Episode 1.02 (14 December 2006) – Clerks
Episode 1.03 (21 December 2006) – It's a Wonderful Life
Episode 1.04 (4 January 2007) – Say Anything...
Episode 1.05 (11 January 2007) – Apocalypse Now
Episode 1.06 (18 January 2007) – Fear and Loathing in Las Vegas
Episode 1.07 (25 January 2007) – The Usual Suspects
Episode 1.08 (1 February 2007) – Goodfellas
Episode 1.09 (8 February 2007) – Manhattan
Episode 1.10 (15 February 2007) – American Psycho
Episode 1.11 (22 February 2007) – The Graduate
Episode 2.01 (7 June 2007) – The Blues Brothers
Episode 2.02 (14 June 2007) – Trainspotting
Episode 2.03 (21 June 2007) – Faster Pussycat Kill Kill
Episode 2.04 (28 June 2007) – Ferris Bueller's Day Off
Episode 2.05 (5 July 2007) – Pulp Fiction
Episode 2.06 (12 July 2007) – Donnie Darko
Episode 2.07 (19 July 2007) – Adaptation
Episode 2.08 (26 July 2007) – The Untouchables
Episode 2.09 (2 August 2007) – On the Town
Episode 2.10 (9 August 2007) – Midnight Cowboy
Episode 2.11 (16 August 2007) – A Clockwork Orange
Episode 2.12 (23 August 2007) – King Kong
Episode 2.13 (30 August 2007) – Back to the Future Part II
Episode 3.01 (9 October 2008) – The Lord of the Rings: The Fellowship of the Ring
Episode 3.02 (16 October 2008) – Lolita
Episode 3.03 (23 October 2008) – Plan 9 from Outer Space
Episode 3.04 (30 October 2008) – On The Waterfront
Episode 3.05 (6 November 2008) – The Shining
Episode 3.06 (13 November 2008) – Singin' in the Rain
Episode 3.07 (20 November 2008) – Goldfinger
Episode 3.08 (27 November 2008) – Blade Runner
Episode 3.09 (4 December 2008) – Psycho
Episode 3.10 (11 December 2008) – Full Metal Jacket
Episode 3.11 (18 December 2008) – Fight Club

=== Interviews ===
People interviewed on the community TV iteration of the show included George Miller (producer), Melanie Coombs, Anthony Lucas, Sarah Watt, Chris Noonan, Everett De Roche, Jack Sargeant, Danny Boyle, Geoffrey Wright, Pixar's Jerome Ranft & Paul Topolos, Roger Donaldson, Robert Connolly, Sue Maslin, Jonathan King, Scott Hicks, Rolf de Heer, Jason Schwartzman, Gillian Armstrong, Brian Trenchard-Smith, David Eggby, Mark Hartley, Steven Berkoff, Leigh Whannell, Bud Tingwell, Nathan Phillips, Jan Sardi and Clara Law.

== On the ABC ==
=== Guide To Sinema ===
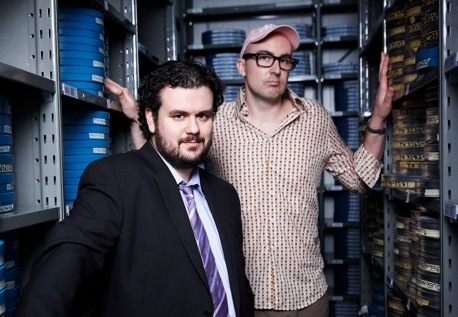

In early 2011, the ABC commissioned a six-part series for ABC2 entitled The Bazura Project's Guide To Sinema. Each episode was devoted to a different cinematic sin: Violence, Sex, Money, Profanity, Drugs and Fame. The series began on 29 September, airing Thursday nights at 9pm.

Regular segments included: History, in which Shannon and Lee give a lesson on how sins were depicted in early cinema; Forgotten Films, featuring Shannon revealing obscure cult works; Lee's Therapy, with Lee explaining to his therapist (David Stratton) how he's been forever scarred by sinful movies; the Future, in which Shannon and Lee travel to the future to meet a robot (Shaun Micallef) who uses sci-fi films to reveal the future of sins; How To Make a Movie, a guide on how to make your very own sinful movie; and The Bazura Project Awards, an elaborate show rewarding cinema's standout sinful scenes.

The series included appearances from Kat Stewart, Tony Martin, Francis Greenslade, Julia Zemiro, John Safran, Bryan Dawe, Michael Ward, Luke Hemsworth, Abe Forsythe, Marc Fennell and Stephanie Bendixsen.

== Radio Free Cinema ==
In 2021, the show returned as a six-part audio series The Bazura Project's Radio Free Cinema, released as a podcast on the Apple, Google, Spotify, Stitcher, and Amazon platforms.

"Radio Free Cinema" was made in the format of a commercial radio show, presented as if old tapes had been recovered and re-released online. The show featured fake movie news, trailers for non-existent films, original music, scripted interviews (often with comedians playing actors or filmmakers), and sketches.

It featured cameos from Tom Ballard, Rusty Berther, Kristy Best, Robyn Butler, Rhonda Burchmore, Santo Cilauro, Marc Fennell, Tim Ferguson, Abe Forsythe, Bob Franklin (comedian), Francis Greenslade, Tosh Greenslade, Roz Hammond, Stephen Hall (actor), Andrew Hansen, Peter Helliar, Tegan Higginbotham, Ming-Zhu Hii, Adam Hills, Claire Hooper, Wayne Hope, Dan Ilic, Laura Hughes, Mark Humphries, Nazeem Hussain, Ed Kavalee, Christopher Kirby, Colin Lane, Tommy Little (comedian), Cassandra Magrath, Tony Martin (comedian), Shaun Micallef, Rhys Muldoon, Brian Nankervis, Celia Pacquola, Geraldine Quinn, Ben Russell, John Safran, Kat Stewart, Emily Taheny, Chris Taylor (comedian), Dave Thornton, Toby Truslove, Michael Veitch, Cal Wilson, and more.

The show was nominated for Best Comedy Podcast and Best Fiction Podcast at the 2022 Australian Podcast Awards, winning Silver in both categories. The sixth episode received a nomination in the Audio - Fiction category at the 55th AWGIE Awards.

== Other works ==
=== Election 2007: Countdown to a Letdown ===
In 2007, the crew moved away from movies to apply the Bazura style to the Australian Federal Election. The one-hour special aired on the eve of the election, Friday 23 November, and featured a look back at the campaign, an instructional video about whom to vote for, a guide on how to be a politician, and an interview with the Australian Democrats' Laura Chipp. In addition to Marinko and Zachariah, the special was also hosted by Emma Race and Adam Knox.

=== The Bazura Project presents Saturday Night Cult Movie ===
Beginning in March 2008, The Bazura Project began introducing Saturday night movies on Channel 31 Melbourne. This ran for three seasons until 2010, and included such classics as the 49th Parallel, Hercules Against the Moon Men and Voyage to the Planet of Prehistoric Women.
