= Community television in Australia =

Community television in Australia is a form of free-to-air non-commercial citizen media in which a television station is owned, operated and/or programmed by a community group to provide local programming to its broadcast area. In principle, community television is another model of facilitating media production and involvement by private citizens and can be likened to public-access television in the United States and community television in Canada.

Each station is a not-for-profit entity and is subject to specific provisions of the Broadcasting Services Act 1992. A Code of Practice, registered with the Australian Communications & Media Authority, provides additional regulation of the sector. The community television stations operate independently so they are technically not a network (in the commonly held definition of the term). However, some programs are broadcast on multiple stations in the group, and they do co-operate with each other in various ways. The stations act collectively through the Australian Community Television Alliance.

"Channel 31" is the colloquial name for some metropolitan community-licensed television stations throughout Australia, with the station in Adelaide now known as Channel 44. The name originated from UHF 31, the frequency and channel number reserved for analogue broadcasts by metropolitan community television stations. By 2010, all stations were broadcasting in 576i standard definition on digital channel 44, and their analogue signals were progressively switched off.

== History ==
In the early 1970s, the Australia Council worked together with various community groups to establish a number of video production centres that could be used to produce Australian television programs. Many people began using these production centres, as well as their own resources, to make television programs. It was still difficult for these programs to be screened on commercial or government-funded television. It has been suggested that this was because the programs were thought to be too short, long or different from the programs already showing.

Whilst community radio stations were quickly established around Australia, community television took longer to develop. During 1984, a Perth-based community group unsuccessfully applied for a community television licence. In the late 1980s in Alice Springs, Imparja Television (now a commercial station) was established. In 1987, RMITV was set up by students at RMIT University in Melbourne. This became the first community television station to receive a test transmission permit.

In 1992, the Government of Australia asked the ABA to conduct a trial of community television using the vacant sixth television channel (UHF 31 in capital cities). Community television services have been provided on a trial basis since 1994 under the open narrowcast 'class licence'. These licences are issued on the condition that they are used only for community and educational non-profit purposes and are held by broadcasters in most Australian capital cities.

In 2002, the legislation was changed to introduce new community television licences and in 2004 the first licences were issued in Sydney, Perth, Melbourne and Brisbane.

=== Decline ===
In September 2014, Minister for Communications Malcolm Turnbull announced that all community television licences would end in December 2015. Just a week before becoming Prime Minister in September 2015, Turnbull amended the deadline by one year, to 31 December 2016. However, Television Sydney later ceased broadcasting on 20 December 2015. The other stations in Melbourne, Brisbane, Adelaide and Perth had already started their shift to online services, but remained broadcasting.

The deadline was extended a number of times at the last minute by Minister for Communications Mitch Fifield, first to 30 June 2017, and later to 31 December 2017. An additional extension to 30 June 2018 was made as part of the government's deal with the Nick Xenophon Team to garner support for large-scale media reforms in the Senate. However, by that point, 31 Digital had already ceased broadcasting on 27 February. A further extension, announced on 1 June 2018, gave broadcasters an additional two years through 30 June 2020.

On the deadline date of 31 June 2020, following further negotiations with the two remaining community stations Channel 44 and C31 Melbourne, Fifield again extended the deadline for an additional 12 months to 30 June 2021.

In June 2021, Channel 44 Adelaide and C31 Melbourne were given a three-year extension, thanks to amendments tabled by South Australian Senator Rex Patrick. After a new government came into power, the community broadcast were given a indefinite extension in 2024, with a 6 month notice period if their space is to be used for other purposes.

=== Video on Demand ===
In 2017, Brisbane's 31 Digital attempted a video on demand service called Queensland Online TV, but was unsuccessful and the service went offline within a year. A second attempt, re-branded as Hitchhike TV was created in 2018 streaming linear programming in short blocks from their website. However, this service was also unsuccessful and went offline in 2020. Newcastle station Hunter TV and Perth station West TV ceased free-to-air transmissions in 2017 and 2020 respectively, but have both attempted video-on-demand presences on Youtube and from their websites.

On 12 August 2021, both C31 Melbourne and 44 Adelaide together with Film Victoria launched a new online streaming service, CTV+. The CTV+ platform allows viewers to stream both channels linearly, or watch programmes on demand. A CTV+ app for mobile devices was launched in August 2022, followed by a smart TV app in November 2025.

== Licensing ==
Australia has a special type of broadcasting licence for community television which is available via free-to-air terrestrial reception. Holders of a community television licence must conform to various rules, primarily relating to advertising and to a lesser extent, program content. They are licensed by, and regulated by, the Australian Communications & Media Authority (ACMA).

In the strictest sense of the term, Australian community television is the officially licensed stations and their programming. However, there are a number of stations and distributors that release similar content - but they are not subject to government regulation.

== Community support ==
Some community television programs are made by amateurs volunteering their skills to produce programs about their own communities and special and diverse interests. In other cases, not-for-profit organisations and independent content creators produce programs. The sector is represented by the Australian Community Television Alliance.

Community television is funded by a mixture of sponsorship, subscriptions and donations, membership fees, grants, and merchandise sales. It receives no regular national government funding. Many programs are paid for by the producers themselves.

The Antenna Awards, recognising outstanding community television programs, were established in 2004 and were awarded annually until 2010. They are traditionally hosted at a gala awards ceremony at Federation Square in Melbourne by C31 Melbourne, and have been revived twice – once in 2014, and again in 2019.The 2021 Antenna Awards were postponed a number of times and eventually held online with the iconic statuette being awarded to over 20 recipients.

A special emphasis of community television is the provision of programs in an increasing range of community languages and about community cultures. Over twenty languages groups, many from newly migrant and refugee communities, are broadcast regularly by the community television stations. Australian Community Television producers are often also producers of other community media, such as the Student Youth Network.

== Stations ==
DVB name	LCN	Launch date	Notes
C31 Melbourne	44	6 Oct 1994	Broadcast in Melbourne, Geelong and surrounding areas. Originally broadcast on UHF 31 until 2010.
Channel 44	44	23 Apr 2004	Broadcast in Adelaide and surrounding areas. Originally known as C31 Adelaide and broadcast on UHF 31 until 2010.

=== Defunct stations ===
Analogue-only stations
Channel name	UHF	Launch date	Discontinued date	Notes
CTV 41 Bendigo	41	19 Jun 1999	30 Jun 1999	Trial service broadcast in Bendigo. Licence cancelled due to failure to broadcast regular programming.
ACE TV	31	May 1994	Dec 2002	Broadcast in Adelaide. Licence cancelled due to conditions breach. Succeeded by C31 Adelaide (now Channel 44) in 2004.
Channel 31	31	1993	23 Apr 2004	Broadcast in Sydney. Succeeded by Television Sydney in 2006.
BushVision	37	23 Sep 2005	4 Mar 2007	Trial service broadcast in Mount Gambier, South Australia.
Access 31	31	18 Jun 1999	6 Aug 2008	Broadcast in Perth and regional WA. Closed due to insolvency. Succeeded by West TV on LCN 44 in 2010.
LINC TV	68	Sep 1993	2012	Broadcast in Lismore, New South Wales. Broadcast intermittently from original launch until final close.

Digital stations
DVB name	LCN	Launch date	Discontinued date	Notes
Television Sydney	44	20 Feb 2006	20 Dec 2015	Broadcast in Sydney, Illawarra, Central Coast, Blue Mountains and Southern Highlands. Originally broadcast on UHF 31 until 2010.
31 Digital	44	31 Jul 1994	28 Feb 2017	Broadcast in Brisbane and surrounding areas. Originally broadcast on UHF 31 until 2010. Reinvented as online streaming service Hitchhike TV.
West TV	44	10 Apr 2010	20 Feb 2020	Broadcast in Perth and surrounding areas.

== Programs ==
Many original television programs have been created by community television stations. These are often broadcast on stations in other states, and sometimes transfer later to pay television or free-to-air. Programs include:

- 1700
- The Bazura Project
- Blokesworld
- Darren & Brose
- The Darren Sanders Show
- Eastern Newsbeat
- Fishcam
- Hot Dog with the Lot
- In Pit Lane
- KO Boxing
- Level 3
- Live on Bowen
- The Marngrook Footy Show
- Planet Nerd
- Raucous
- Russian Kaleidoscope
- Salam Cafe
- Studio A
- Under Melbourne Tonight
- Vasili's Garden
- What's Goin' On There?
- Whose Shout

== See also ==
- Amateur television
- Citizen journalism
- Community radio
