= BushVision =

- Country: Australia
- Broadcast area: Mount Gambier

Programming
- Picture format: Analogue 4:3

Ownership
- Owner: BushVision Inc.

History
- Launched: September 23, 2005; 19 years ago
- Closed: March 4, 2007; 18 years ago

Availability

Terrestrial
- Analogue: UHF 37

BushVision was a free-to-air community television station based in Mount Gambier, South Australia. The station began broadcasting on 23 September 2005 on UHF 37 on a 12-month trial licence that was twice extended for a total of 18 months. From its original launch, BushVision had plans to broadcast nationally throughout regional Australia, using Mount Gambier as an initial testing area, but these plans were rejected by the Australian Communications and Media Authority. The station later closed on 4 March 2007 when their licence expired.

== See also ==
- Community television in Australia
- Television broadcasting in Australia
