= Baverstock (surname) =

Baverstock is a surname. Notable people with the name include:

- Bert Baverstock (1883–1951), English footballer
- Donald Baverstock (1924–95), British TV producer and executive
- Garry Baverstock (born 1949), Australian architect, property developer, author and scientist
- Gillian Baverstock (1931–2007), English author
- Ray Baverstock (born 1963), English footballer and manager

== See also ==
- Baverstock
- The Baverstock Academy
