= Access 31 =

Community television station in Perth, Western Australia

- Country: Australia
- Broadcast area: Perth and regional WA

Programming
- Picture format: Analogue 4:3

Ownership
- Owner: Channel 31 Community; Educational Television Limited

History
- Launched: 18 June 1999; 27 years ago
- Closed: 6 August 2008; 18 years ago
- Replaced by: West TV

Availability

Terrestrial
- Analogue: UHF 31 (map)

Access 31 (call sign ATW-31) was a free-to-air community television station based in Perth, Western Australia which operated between 1999 and 2008 before closing due to insolvency. The station had broadcast on UHF 31 from NEW's television mast at Carmel in the Perth Hills. It was also available at certain times on the Westlink Network, which at the time was broadcast via the Optus Aurora satellite service and some analogue terrestrial repeaters which included the city of Albany.

== History ==
Access 31 started broadcasting on 18 June 1999, and received a permanent broadcasting licence in 2002. The station was originally based at the Mt Lawley campus of Edith Cowan University before moving to premises in Belmont in late 2003.

Access 31 had complemented existing television services in the state with an emphasis on locally produced programming, and at its height drew in a viewing audience in excess of 800,000 different people per month, competing favorably against other television networks. However, as viewers began to move to digital television in the mid-2000s, Access 31's audience reach became progressively reduced as no access to the digital broadcasting spectrum had yet been allocated to the analogue-only community Channel 31 stations by the Australian Federal Government at the time. With ramifications for future advertising revenue, combined with a financial situation already compounded by an estimated $600,000 in debts, in June 2008 the station announced that it was in serious danger of closing due to insolvency unless additional funding could be obtained and a guarantee for future access to digital television services from the Federal Government could be secured.

A grant from Lotterywest and a financial contribution from Garry Baverstock, a Perth architect totaling $750,000 had been planned to keep the station on the air for at least the next 18 months, time the station's board believed would see action from the Federal Government. However the station was also forced to cut jobs and volunteer numbers, in addition to limiting broadcast hours and in-house production of programs in order to keep the station afloat for the time being. Later it was revealed that a total of $1.3 million was required to keep the station operating until December 2009, when it was thought the Federal Government would provide a rescue package.

=== Closure ===
At 5pm (AWST) on 6 August 2008, Access 31 ceased transmission after both the Lotterywest grant and the private contribution was withdrawn. CEO Andrew Brine had resigned the previous day, the station unable to pay his salary. Programme providers were not informed of the decision to close the station.

Fred Mafrica, host and producer of The Couch – one of the station's more popular programs, offered to run the station for free on a temporary basis, backed by almost 100 volunteers, while also appealing for help from the state government. Ma Xi Bo, owner of local media company Perth Chinese Media Group, also presented an offer to return the station back on the air, as did a consortium of local producers and business people aligned with Murdoch University. Ultimately, on 1 September 2008 the station's board voted to liquidate Access 31's assets in order to pay off its debtors. The Australian Communications and Media Authority cancelled the station's broadcasting licence later that month.

== Programming ==
Access 31 had broadcast a number of popular local programs including Wake Up! WA, a breakfast show broadcast live daily; The Locker Room, a 3-hour discussion panel program discussing everything happening in local sports that was broadcast live every week;WAFL On, which focused on the West Australian Football League; Charlie's Kitchen, a cooking show; flicktease, a film review show; Sweet and Sour, a discussion panel program; and The Couch, a chat/variety show that also featured live performances from up and coming local musicians. The station also carried a number of programs originally produced at other Channel 31 stations in other states. Access 31 also had broadcast old movies, classic television shows and programming and current news bulletins sourced from Deutsche Welle, Voice of America and BBC World News.

In July and August 2001, Access 31 broadcast the 2001 Ashes series in England free-to-air in Perth after the Seven Network opted not the broadcast the series for Perth audiences due to time differences. Then-Premier of Western Australia Geoff Gallop, who had pressured Seven to release the rights to Access 31, made appearances during the broadcast as a guest analyst.

After its closure, a small number of Access 31's locally produced shows secured broadcast slots on Foxtel's Aurora Community Channel. A number of shows previously broadcast by Access 31 also appeared on successor channel West TV.

== Controversy ==
Access 31 previously faced closure in 2003, when the station went into voluntary administration. The station had faced criticism for alleged mismanagement of their finances for years. Garry Baverstock, who pledged $500,000 to rescue the station before withdrawing his offer, claimed that he was misled about the station's financial position.

In the weeks before its closure, the station claimed that the Federal Government had committed to community digital television after Access 31 was rescued, yet this statement concerning a change in policy was dismissed by the Department of Broadband, Communications and the Digital Economy. The Federal Government later allowed community stations access to the digital spectrum from late 2009, more than a year after the closure of Access 31.

== See also ==
- West TV
- Channel 31
- Westlink
- Television broadcasting in Australia
