= Newy 87.8 FM =

Radio station in Newcastle, New South Wales, Australia

Newy 87.8 FM (2NN)
- Newcastle, New South Wales; Australia
- Broadcast area: Newcastle, Lake Macquarie, Maitland, Port Stephens, Central Coast
- Frequencies: 87.8 MHz FM (2014–present); Optus D2 Satellite (2022–2023); Intelsat 19 Satellite (2022–2023)
- Branding: Newy 87.8 FM

Programming
- Language: English
- Format: Classic Hits

History
- First air date: 20 April 2014
- Former call signs: Classic Hits FM (2014–2020); Hunter TV (2014–2020)

Links
- Website: Official website

Newy 87.8 FM (call sign: 2NN) is a narrowcast FM radio station targeting Classic Hits music enthusiasts across Newcastle and the Central Coast, Australia on a frequency of 87.8 MHz. The station plays 1950s to 1980s music. The station also produces online video content covering local events.

The station's playout facility is at 1A McIntosh Drive, Mayfield West with remote studios located in Beaumont Street. Hamilton, Newcastle West, Elermore Vale, Tamworth and Penrith. The station transmits from a number of FM transmitters across Newcastle and the Central Coast.

== History ==
Hunter TV logo

2NN Classic Hits FM was founded by Craig Allen and first went to air in 2014. It was a part of a national network of narrowcast radio stations playing classic hits music. The network included Classic Hits stations in Orange, Wollongong, Mudgee, Mid North Coast, Bowral, Wagga Wagga, Taree and Roma, Queensland. There were other branding variations on the network including Oldies FM and Air FM in Penrith and a shortwave radio station called Ozyradio

Hunter TV was formed in 2014 with the intent to gain a community television licence to broadcast on free-to-air digital terrestrial television in Newcastle, with the station going live online on 1 March 2014. However, their initial application for a community television licence from the Australian Communications & Media Authority, and later appeals, were rejected due to uncertainty surrounding the future of community television. Hunter TV later reinforced their online services, becoming a community-orientated live streaming and video on demand service.

In September 2020 2NN split from the Classic Hits FM network and merged with Hunter TV forming a new station 'Newy 87.8 FM'. The merged entity creates audio content for radio and video content for their video on demand service.

In 2022 coverage was extended to Gosford and the station plans to extend this further south through the North Shore and Northern Beaches of Sydney in 2023.

== Stars of Newcastle ==
Hunter TV was one of the founding partners who helped launch the Cancer Council's 'Stars of Newcastle' event by promoting and producing video content for the initiative. Hunter TV also provided project management and consulting services to the event organisers. During Hunter TV's tenure, the event raised over $465,000 for the charity.

== Current On-Air Schedule ==
- 'Drive' with Darren McErlain 4 pm to 6 pm, 7 days a week (Show 2020-2026)
- 'Webby's Wireless Show' incorporates 'On this day' and 'It's a funny old world' which airs at various times throughout the day.
- 'Feel Good Weekends' with Matt Morris, Saturday and Sunday 6 pm to 9 pm
- 'Afternoons' with Paul Rothapfel, 1 pm to 4 pm weekdays.
- 'Saturday Mornings' with Diana Lampard, 9 am to 1 pm Saturdays.
- UPDATE: Matt Morris, Paul Rothapfel and Dianna Lampard are now with NEW-FM 105.3 Newcastle
- UPDATE: Darren McErlain eft the station in August 2026, and is now hosting Breakfast on Radio 1629AM Newcastle & ACE-FM Valla Beach.
