= CTV 41 Bendigo =

- Country: Australia
- Broadcast area: Bendigo

Programming
- Language: English
- Picture format: Analogue 4:3

Ownership
- Owner: Bendigo Community Television Inc.

History
- Launched: 19 June 1999
- Closed: 30 June 1999

Availability

Terrestrial
- Analogue: UHF 41

CTV 41 Bendigo was a free-to-air community television station based in Bendigo. The station was awarded a trial licence in July 1996 for broadcasting on UHF 41. On 2 April 1998, the Australian Broadcasting Authority, regulator of television and radio broadcasting in Australia, decided to not renew the trial licences of community broadcasters that were not yet on-air, but the intervention of the Community Broadcasting Association of Australia prompted the extension of such licences from 1 July 1998 to 30 June 1999.

The station eventually began broadcasting a test pattern on 19 June 1999 on UHF 41. On 26 June 1999, a 3-hour tape of programming information and music was broadcast on a loop. The station's licence was cancelled on 30 June 1999 due to its failure to broadcast regular programming.
