= LINC TV =

Community TV station in Lismore, New South Wales, Australia

- Country: Australia
- Broadcast area: Lismore, New South Wales

Programming
- Picture format: Analogue 4:3

Ownership
- Owner: Local Informative Network Community Television Ltd

History
- Launched: September 1993; 32 years ago
- Closed: 2012; 14 years ago

Availability

Terrestrial
- Analogue: UHF 68

LINC TV was a free-to-air community television station based in Lismore, New South Wales. The station was originally launched in September 1993 on UHF 68 as Australia's first community television station and broadcast intermittently until its final closure in 2012.

Unlike other community television stations, LINC TV did not broadcast 24 hours, instead broadcasting on set days throughout the week.

== History ==
In 1989, Marion Conrow, an arts student at the Southern Cross University in Lismore, then a campus of the, University of New England, came up with the idea to create a community television station in Lismore. The new station, LINC TV, received an 8-month licence for test broadcasting in 1992 and was launched in September 1993 on UHF 68. The station was later granted $260,000 by the university and a permanent broadcasting licence in 1994.

LINC TV was closed in early 1999 after losing funding from Southern Cross University. The station recommenced broadcasting in October 2000 after constructing a new tower at Tullera in August that year. The station was off-air from late-January 2001 to mid-November 2001 after their new transmitter, installed in early January, went offline from damage. LINC TV was again taken off-air on 18 August 2003 for extensive upgrades and due to the fact that operating the station required a large amount of time and money. The station began test-pattern broadcasts in July 2004 and recommenced regular transmission in September 2004.

In March 2006, LINC TV posted a submission to the Australian Parliament's Inquiry into Community Broadcasting inquiring to the possibility of its broadcasts being carried by a regional television network on digital television in an attempt to keep the station on-air. However, LINC TV never renewed the contract for digital broadcasting or find a regional network that would carry their station, and was finally closed in 2012.

== See also ==
- Community television in Australia
- Television broadcasting in Australia
