= Hot Dog with the Lot =

- Genre: Comedy; Game show
- Created by: Mark Ciobo
- Presented by: Erin Klein
- Country of origin: Australia
- Original language: English
- No. of seasons: 4
- No. of episodes: 42

Original release
- Network: C31 Melbourne; Aurora Community Channel

Hot Dog with the Lot is a comedy game show created by Mark Ciobo that first aired in 2005 on community television (Channel 31) throughout Australia and New Zealand, but in 2007, the show was picked up for broadcast on Foxtel and Austar respectively in the two nations. The show was created and produced by a team of Melbourne filmmakers, some of whom created the successful Crazy Crosswords on Briz 31.
