= West TV =

Community television station in Perth, Western Australia

- Country: Australia
- Broadcast area: Perth and surrounding areas

Programming
- Language: English
- Picture format: 576i (SDTV) 16:9

Ownership
- Owner: West TV Ltd

History
- Launched: 10 April 1996; 30 years ago
- Replaced: Access 31
- Closed: 20 February 2020; 6 years ago
- Former names: New Visions 31 (original concept)

Availability

Terrestrial
- DVB-T: 32
- Freeview (virtual): 44

West TV (WTV, call-sign CTW32) was a free-to-air community television station that began broadcasting in standard-definition digital format on logical channel 44 in Perth, Western Australia at 10 am on 10 April 2010.

In February 2020 West TV ceased broadcasting on free-to-air television due to financial difficulties, but will continue with a presence on social media and YouTube.

== History ==
The station was awarded a two-year trial licence by the Australian Communications and Media Authority after the closure of previous Perth community station licence holder Access 31 in 2008 followed by an apparatus licence at the end of April 2009. On 4 November 2009 Communications Minister Stephen Conroy approved a digital TV only licence which allows West TV to broadcast with other community television stations which are planning to simulcast their services until the switch to digital-only television in capital cities by 2014.

On 1 April 2010, the first video test was performed, with a testcard and then a promotional video loop going to air.

In September 2014, Australian federal communications minister Malcolm Turnbull announced that licensing for community television stations would end in December 2015. In September 2015, Turnbull, now Prime Minister, announced an extension of the deadline to 31 December 2016. The deadline was further extended twice at the last minute by Minister for Communications Mitch Fifield, first to 30 June 2017, and later to 31 December 2017. Fifield made an additional extension to 30 June 2018 as part of the government's deal with the Nick Xenophon Team to garner support for large-scale media reforms in the Senate, while a further extension, announced on 1 June 2018, gave broadcasters an additional two years through 30 June 2020.

WTV, like other community television stations, later began streaming its channel live on their website, which allowed access to viewers outside of its traditional broadcast area.

On 20 February 2020 the station announced that it was forced to cease broadcasting on free-to-air television due to financial difficulties. The station will continue to engage with viewers and the community through social media and YouTube however. A GoFundMe campaign was also launched to try and raise $30,000 for facilities, equipment and administration costs.

== Programming ==
West TV featured a broad range of programs broadcast around the clock, seven days a week. The programming reflected the diversity and needs of the Perth community and included documentaries, films, sport, music, education, religion, multicultural, entertainment, leisure and lifestyle programs. While the focus is on WA-based programming, some programs are sourced from interstate community channels and from other professional programme makers world-wide. Local programming included the entertainment show Friday Night Live and current affairs program Undercurrent. West TV also broadcast classic movies and television shows and also live programming and news bulletins from Deutsche Welle, Al Jazeera English, RT World News.

West TV was given the broadcast rights to the world exclusive concert for UK superstar Sir Cliff Richard & The Shadows; the concert was screened in June 2010. West TV also produced local outside broadcasts such as the Tom Hoad Cup VIII international water polo tournament which was held in Melville.

== See also ==
- Community television in Australia
- Television broadcasting in Australia
- Australian Community Television Alliance
