= Blokesworld =

- Genre: Lifestyle
- Created by: Adrian Knox
- Written by: Adrian Knox
- Creative director: Adrian Knox
- Presented by: Ado
- Starring: Ado, Kambo and Camera 3
- Country of origin: Australia
- Original language: English
- No. of seasons: 7
- No. of episodes: 380

Production
- Executive producer: Adrian Knox
- Producer: Adrian Knox
- Cinematography: Camera 3
- Editors: Ado and Camera 3
- Camera setup: Ado, Kambo and Camera 3
- Production company: Fort Knox Productions

Original release
- Network: C31 (2003, 2006–present); Network Ten (2004–2005); 7mate (2012, 2016–present); One (2013–2015); 4ME (2015–2016); Aurora
- Release: February 2003 – present

Blokesworld is an Australian lifestyle television series. It was originally shown on Channel 31 in 2003, and is currently shown on 7mate and Aurora Community Television channel on the pay TV network Foxtel in late night timeslots. It is also long-running in New Zealand on Triangle TV and Face TV.

== Show ==
The creators and main presenters of Blokesworld are "Ado" and "Ben Wah", however in recent seasons Ben Wah appears in fewer segments. The format of the show is based around regular segments that focus on subjects like motor sports, motorsport & music events, exotic dancing, sports shooting, and unique aspects of Australian culture and society. In most episodes a connecting theme is interspersed among these segments.

== History ==
Blokesworld began as a slow-paced, low-budget Saturday night program on the national community network Channel 31 in 2003. The concept of the show stemmed from Ado and Ben Wah's newfound interest in dirt biking, following years of playing in bands together and dabbling in music journalism. They had the idea that Australian television needed a more "bloke friendly" program, and set about completing six episodes of a show that combined the dirt biking theme with pole dancing, discussion on all matter of trucks and cars, and various other "blokey" subjects. The episodes were then submitted to Channel 31, in hopes that a late-night slot could be secured. When Channel 31 suggested that six more episodes be made to constitute a full series, Ado and Ben Wah moved production into the former's Queensland home and took odd jobs to make ends meet. Blokesworld began on Channel 31 in February 2003. Much of the funding for the series at the time came from sponsorship deals with companies such as Globe and 1-800 Reverse.

Many unsuccessful attempts to sell Blokesworld to the commercial networks followed. Eventually, Steve Dundon of the Melbourne-based production company Cornerbox expressed interest in the show and convinced Network Ten to place Blokesworld in a Friday night graveyard slot. To be closer to Cornerbox, Ado and Ben Wah relocated the production from Queensland to Whittlesea, Victoria, during 2004.

Ten launched the second series of Blokesworld on 1 September 2004. By then the show had better editing and sponsorship from more lucrative companies like Ford Motor Company (which ties in with the show's portrayal of Ford's V8 engined utes). It consistently won its timeslot.

Blokesworld's final season for Channel Ten concluded in November 2005. The latest season, subtitled Spin The Globe, was filmed in Europe and Japan during 2006, and began appearing in November that year on the community cable channel Aurora (via Foxtel/Austar). An anthology of each of the show's first three seasons has been released on DVD.

Blokesworld entered the Australian lexicon when in response to Senate candidate Wayne Dropulich of the Australian Sports Party posting on Facebook a picture of a topless woman as part of his campaign online criticism included "Parliament House is not Blokes World".

== Controversy ==
On 16 September 2005, a live-show spinoff of Blokesworld, "Blokesworld Live", was banned by Brisbane City Council fifteen hours before the event was to commence at Brisbane's RNA Showgrounds. Though the organisers stressed that the event was well-organised and in accordance with public liability, security and OHS regulations, Brisbane City Council had given in to political pressure from individuals and groups such as the Young Women's Christian Association to stop "Blokesworld Live" from going ahead. The event was rescheduled to nearby Ipswich at the start of October.
