= Channel 31 (Sydney) =

- Country: Australia
- Broadcast area: Sydney
- Headquarters: St. Leonards

Programming
- Language: English
- Picture format: Analogue 4:3

Ownership
- Owner: Community Television Sydney Ltd

History
- Launched: 1993; 33 years ago
- Closed: 23 April 2004; 22 years ago
- Replaced by: Television Sydney in 2006

Availability

Terrestrial
- Analogue: UHF 31

Channel 31 (call sign CTN-31) was a free-to-air community television station in Sydney. The station began broadcasting in 1993 as Australia's first metropolitan community television station.

The licence of its operator, Community Television Sydney, was revoked by the Australian Broadcasting Authority and given to rival Television Sydney in March 2004. Channel 31's licence was temporarily extended pending a federal court hearing on the issue, but the station ultimately ceased operations at midnight on 23 April 2004.
