= Garry Baverstock =

Australian architect, property developer, author and scientist

Garry Frederick Baverstock AM (born 1949) is an Australian Perth-based architect, property developer, author and scientist, specialising in energy efficient building design. He was one of the pioneers of sustainable architecture in Australia, championing passive solar design of buildings and the use of solar energy.

== Career ==
Baverstock founded Ecotect Architects in 1969.

He is a professor and Built Environment Program Manager of the Research Institute of Sustainable Energy at Murdoch University in Perth.

Baverstock became president of the International Solar Energy Society in Western Australia after holding the position of Honorary Secretary from 1979 to 1986.

His work is primarily involved with solar energy design and promoting green urbanism.

He has designed over 700 solar houses in all climates throughout Australia. Along with his wife Julia Hayes, he designed the eco-friendly Swanbourne Business Centre in Swanbourne, Western Australia.

He is co-founder and director of the solar energy website solar-e.com.

== Recognition ==
Baverstock has received the Order of Australia in public recognition of his environmental and philanthropic achievements.

He was made a Life Fellow of the Australian Institute of Architects.

== Access 31 ==
In 2008 it was reported that Baverstock presented a $500,000 rescue package to community television station Access 31. Baverstock, who pledged $500,000 to rescue the station before withdrawing his offer, claimed that he was misled about the station's financial position.

== Publications ==
Baverstock has authored over 50 papers and publications, including co-authorship of the design manual "Low Energy Buildings in Australia" (1986) with Sam Paolino.
