= The Darren Sanders Show =

- Genre: talk show
- Created by: Darren Sanders
- Presented by: Darren Sanders
- Country of origin: Australia
- Original language: English
- No. of seasons: 5
- No. of episodes: 47

Production
- Executive producer: Darren Sanders
- Editor: Mike Buchanan
- Running time: 30 minutes

Original release
- Network: Channel 31 (2012-); GO! (2013-2014); Aurora Foxtel (2016-2017)
- Release: 2012 – present

The Darren Sanders Show is an Australian talk show television series aired on Channel 31 in 2012. An initial order of 4 weekly episodes will air on Nine's digital channel GO! from 2 October 2013, hosted by Darren Sanders.
