= Raucous =

- Country of origin: Australia
- Original language: English

Production
- Production locations: RMIT University; Melbourne, Australia
- Running time: Approx. 30 min. (including commercials)
- Production company: RMITV (Student Community Television Inc.)

Original release
- Network: C31 Melbourne
- Release: 8 February 2001

Raucous was a live, half an hour, RMITV program broadcast on C31 Melbourne featuring youth-oriented segments, arts reviews, comedy skits, interviews, street talks and live music. It was co-hosted by Lyndon Horsburgh and featured segments with Hamish and Andy's Hamish Blake and Andy Lee. The show debuted on Thursday 8 February 2001.
