= In Pit Lane =

- Genre: Motorsport program
- Presented by: Brett Ramsey
- Country of origin: Australia
- Original language: English

Production
- Producer: Brett Ramsey
- Production locations: RMIT University Melbourne, Victoria
- Running time: 30 minutes (including sponsorships)
- Production companies: RMITV (Student Community Television Inc.); RMIT Student Union

Original release
- Network: C31 (1998 - 2024); Optus Vision (1996-1998 )
- Release: 1996 – 2024

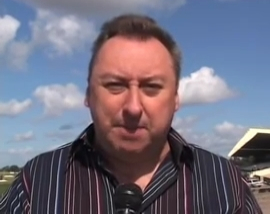
In Pit Lane presenter Brett Ramsey in September 2006

In Pit Lane is an Australian motor sports television show produced in conjunction with RMITV currently broadcasting on C31 Melbourne in Melbourne, Australia with the support of Online Invent a Melbourne based SEO and Web Design Company. In Pit Lane began in 1996 on the now defunct OptusVision service before moving to C31 in 1999.

The program is produced and staffed entirely from volunteer members of Melbourne Student Community Television Inc. trading as RMITV.

Brett Ramsey, the Producer and Host of the show created In Pit Lane as a short term project while recovering from a serious back injury.
