= Television Sydney =

Community TV channel in Sydney, Australia

- 2006-2012 logo
- Country: Australia
- Broadcast area: Sydney, Southern Highlands, Illawarra, Central Coast, Blue Mountains

Programming
- Language: English
- Picture format: 576i (SDTV) 16:9

Ownership
- Owner: A consortium consisting of: University of Western Sydney; Metro Screen; SLICE TV

History
- Launched: 20 February 2006; 20 years ago
- Replaced: Channel 31 Sydney
- Closed: 20 December 2015; 10 years ago

Links
- Website: web.archive.org/web/20151218214029/http://www.tvs.org.au/

Availability

Terrestrial
- DVB-T: 32
- Freeview C31 (virtual): 44

Television Sydney (TVS) (call sign TSN-31) was a free-to-air sponsors-based community television station broadcasting in Sydney, Australia. The station lost both its community franchise and the battle to remain on the air on 8 December 2015 and ceased transmission on 20 December 2015 after almost ten years on the air. The station was not replaced.

== History ==
In 2003 the Australian Government called for tenders for what it called the "permanent" community TV licenses. For many years community channels in the major capital cities had operated on narrowcast licenses issued for limited 12-month periods. Everywhere but Sydney the incumbent channels secured the permanent licence. In Sydney, a consortium headed-up by the University of Western Sydney (UWS) was successful. TVS received its Iicense in early 2004.

Transmissions officially commenced on analogue UHF channel 31 in February 2006 after three months of technical trials. Unlike the earlier temporary community channel (known simply as Channel 31) TVS, with the financial support of UWS TVS was able to acquire a high powered transmitter that meant for the first time community TV could be seen right across Sydney.

In November 2009 the Government agreed to temporarily allocate TVS (and the other capital city Community Television channels) an additional (digital) channel so they could simulcast in the period up until the end of 2013 when analogue television will be turned off. TVS announced in December 2009 that it had appointed Broadcast Australia as its digital service provider and officially began simulcasting on Monday 1 March 2010 on LCN 44.

Since February 2009 TVS simultaneously streamed its service via the internet. At the time Chief Executive, Laurie Patton, said the decision to transmit live via the web was part of the station's long-term strategy to be available across all distribution platforms.

In 2009 the Australian Communications and Media Authority approved the station's request for the renewal of its broadcasting licence for a five-year period ending 22 April 2014.

When it commenced on air operations TVS was Sydney's first new permanent free-to-air TV channel in twenty-five years. It was backed by the University of Western Sydney (UWS) and Metro Screen.

TVS switched off its analogue signal on 1 March 2012. The station then only broadcast on LCN 44, with viewers requiring a digital television, or a digital set top box to use with an analogue television.

In September 2014, Australian federal communications minister Malcolm Turnbull announced that licensing for community television stations would end in December 2015. In September 2015, Turnbull, now Prime Minister, announced an extension of the deadline to 31 December 2016, However, TVS' CEO Rachel Bentley stated that TVS could only continue broadcasting if it also launched a video on demand service before the amended deadline. TVS announced that it would cease broadcasting on 20 December 2015 in order to refocus programming strategy and develop a strong digital infrastructure, with plans to relaunch online in 2016. However, these plans were not materialized and the channel 31 frequency remains Dark as of 2026.

== Broadcast programs ==
TVS broadcast 24 hours a day 7 days a week. Despite a very limited marketing budget the channel progressively created a loyal audience. TVS recorded continual increases in cumulative audience numbers during the first few years. However, as digital take-up in Sydney increased the channel reported a leveling off of audience growth during 2009. When it launched its digital service in early 2010 audience levels began to increase again with a 15 percent increase in the first month (source OzTAM).

TVS used the same Broadcast Australia tower as the ABC and SBS located at Gore Hill. The channel provided coverage across most of Sydney, with reports of clear reception from locations as far south as Wollongong, in the lower Blue Mountains and on the Central Coast. Its Digital 44 service had coverage that was equivalent to SBS (and the other free-to-airs), except that TVS did not have a number of in-fill repeaters that boost signals in some "black spots".

TVS had a broadcast operations centre on the UWS Penrith campus. The station's digital automation system was based on the Playbox () software.

The focus was on Sydney-specific programming with some programs sourced from interstate community channels (e.g. Vasili's Garden from Melbourne) and from professional program makers. As at February 2010 more than forty percent of the channel's programs were Sydney produced with a further thirty percent drawn from interstate community based producers.

The station screened feature films in the public domain on weekday mornings and in prime time on Sunday and Wednesday evenings. On Friday nights it screened horror and science fiction films on the Schlocky Horror Picture Show hosted by a skeleton named Nigel Honeybone.

From April 2015, The station screened children's programming on weekday mornings and afternoons and screens and sponsors Butterscotch's Playground shorts featuring former yellow Wiggle Greg Page.

From May 2015, The station screened news programming on weekday mornings and afternoons with a replay and sponsors Seven News with Mark Ferguson presented by the news presenter himself.

Not-for-profit community based producers received free program airtime. TVS announced the creation of the Television Sydney Foundation whose aim is to secure philanthropic donations that will be used to support the development of local programming.

The TVS program schedule was based on a "modified wheel" concept where programs were run several times in the same week to allow audiences a choice of viewing times. The station's program line-up was published on its website, in most Australian electronic program guides (EPG's) and in the Sydney Morning Herald and Daily Telegraph newspapers.

TVS accepted sponsorship advertising, limited to seven minutes per hour. It also sold program airtime (a maximum of eight hours per day as permitted under its license conditions).

=== Programmes ===
- Pete Boone, Private Eye (2002–2004)
- Vasili's Garden (2002–2006, 2009–)

== Staffing and management ==
The channel had a small team of paid employees and volunteers (many of them media students) and was initially headed up by former Seven Network executive Laurie Patton as CEO, Henri de Gorter as Program Manager and Adrian Alback (later Ian Sneddon) as Operations Manager.

The original TVS Chairperson was UWS Vice-Chancellor, Professor Janice Reid AM and later UWS Deputy Chancellor Geoffrey Roberson. In August 2010, TVS announced the appointment of a new chairperson Harold Mitchell and a new CEO Rachel Bentley, a UWS academic.

TVS was a founding member of the Australian Community Television Alliance (ACTA), the official sector representative. Then CEO Laurie Patton was the inaugural Secretary of ACTA and the sector's representative on the Government's Digital Switchover Taskforce Industry Advisory Group. TVS led the sector's campaign to secure digital spectrum and inclusion on the Freeview free-to-air platform.

== Identity history ==
- 2006–2012: You're Watching TVS
- 2012–2015: A Different View

== See also ==
- Television broadcasting in Australia
- Community television in Australia
- Australian Community Television Alliance
