= Australian Community Television Alliance =

The Australian Community Television Alliance (ACTA) is a not-for-profit industry association representing free-to-air community television (CTV) channels licensed by the Australian Government under the Cth. Broadcasting Services Act 1992.

ACTA has been established to represent existing and potential CTV licensees and to advance the interests of community television. It also developed the community television codes of practice for community TV licence holders in 2011.

ACTA is currently governed by an executive group currently consisting of the heads of the capital city CTV stations.

Full voting membership of ACTA is open to CTV licensees who broadcast for more than 12 hours per day for at least 5 days per week. Non-voting associate membership is open to CTV licensees not meeting this qualification.
