= Aurora Community Channel =

Australian television channel

- Country: Australia
- Headquarters: Crows Nest

Programming
- Language(s): English
- Picture format: 576i (SDTV 16:9)

History
- Launched: 1 March 2005; 20 years ago

Links
- Website: Official website

Aurora Community Channel is an Australian subscription television channel that screens locally produced community television programs. Launched in 2005 on Foxtel, it is currently on channel 173, prior to the launch of Christian channels on Foxtel, it was on Channel 183. Aurora is available to all digital subscription TV subscribers on the basic tier.

As a not for profit independent channel, Aurora broadcasts original Australian programs and understanding of community issues and interests.

- The NEMBC's twice national Antenna Award Multicultural AFL Football TV Panel Show. A weekly Multicultural and Diversity look at the full seasons of AFL / AFLW Footy, reviews, interviews and previews, hosted by Vanessa Gatica with Harbir Singh Kang, George Grosios with Fouad Andrawos, Rajbir Ghiuman, Tash Rallios and Liz Honey. NEMBC Exec Producer/ Director: Fiv Antoniou. Supported by the Australian Football League (AFL) and the Community Broadcast Foundation (CBF).

== Programmes ==
- IWA Pro Wrestling (2008–2009)
- Pete Boone, Private Eye (2005-present)
- This is AWF Wrestling (2010–2011)
- Schlocky Horror Picture Show
