= Television broadcasting in Australia =

Total employment (thousands of people) in Australian broadcasting (includes television and radio but not internet) since 1984

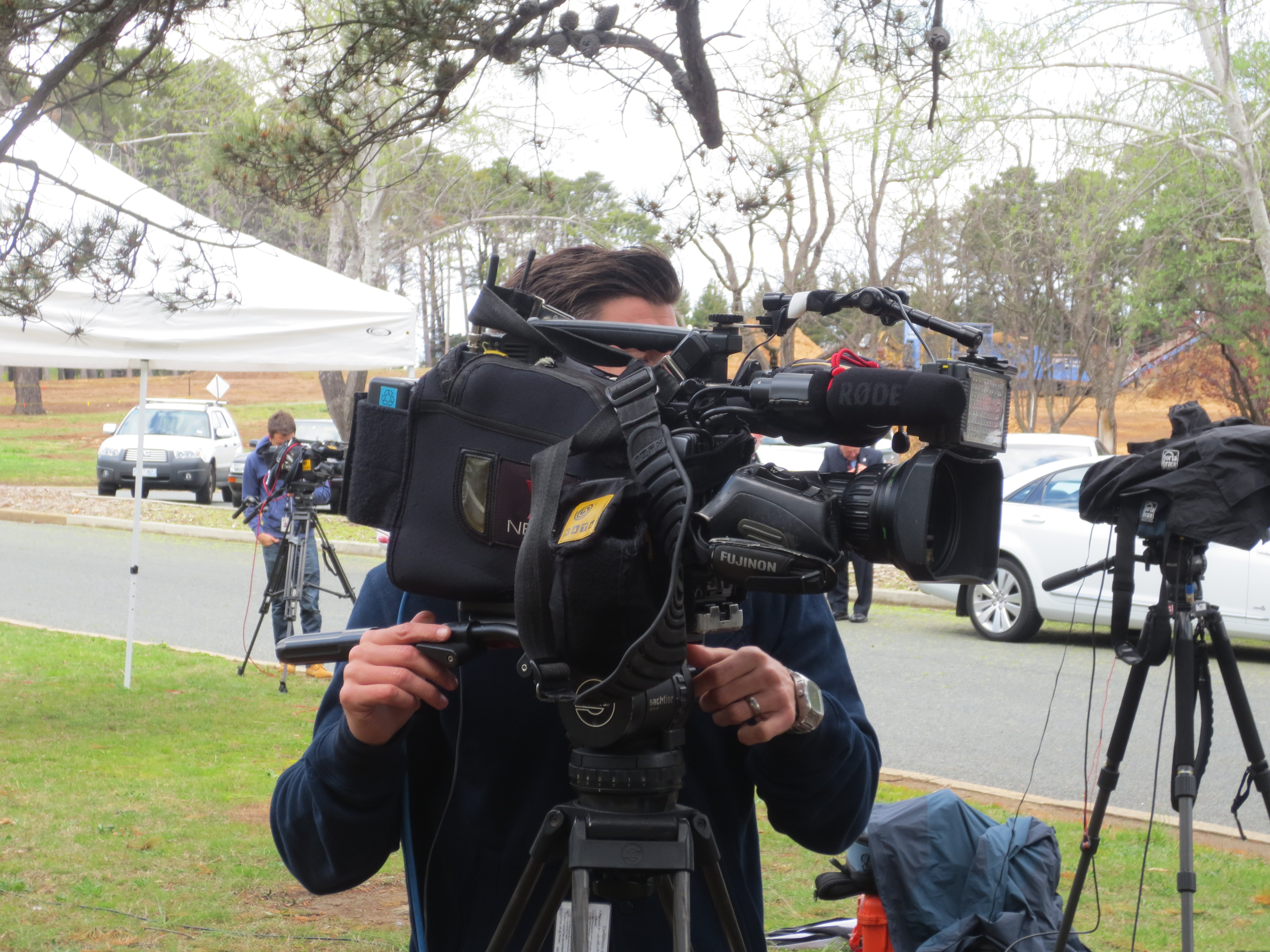
Outdoor filming for TV in Canberra (2013)

Television broadcasting in Australia began officially on 16 September 1956, with the opening of TCN-9, quickly followed by national and commercial stations in Sydney and Melbourne, all these being in 625-line black and white. The commencement date was designed so as to provide coverage of the Olympic Games in Melbourne. It has now grown to be a nationwide system that includes a broad range of public, commercial, community, subscription, narrowcast, and amateur stations.

Colour television in the PAL 625-line format was introduced in 1967 and went to a full-time basis on 1 March 1975 while subscription television, on the Galaxy platform, began in January 1995. Digital terrestrial television was introduced on 1 January 2001 in Australia's five largest capital cities.

As early as 1929, two Melbourne commercial radio stations, 3UZ and 3DB were conducting experimental mechanical television broadcasts – these were conducted in the early hours of the morning, after the stations had officially closed down. In 1934, Dr Val McDowall at amateur station 4CM Brisbane conducted experiments in electronic television.

== Public television ==
Australia has three national public broadcasters, the Australian Broadcasting Corporation, the Special Broadcasting Service, and, as more recently, National Indigenous Television.

=== Australian Broadcasting Corporation ===
ABC Television is a division of the Australian Broadcasting Corporation, established in 1956. ABC TV, ABC Family, ABC Entertains and ABC News are available nationally. The ABC also operates ABC Australia, focused at the Asia Pacific region and is not available in Australia.

ABC TV carries a variety of local and national news, current affairs, and sports coverage, as well as Australian arts and comedy programming. It is well known for broadcasting British programming, primarily from the BBC, ITV, and Channel 4.

ABC Family, established as a second digital-only channel called ABC2 on 7 March 2005. Originally aimed at providing 'more choice, more often', the channel mainly provided repeats of popular ABC productions, such as Australian Story and Stateline, and was prohibited by law from carrying programmes from a number of genres; however, after the removal of these restrictions the channel's content was broadened considerably. It was announced by the ABC that, from 4 December 2017, ABC2 was to be replaced by ABC Comedy, ending the channel's 12-year run. On 3 June 2024 it was rebranded to its current name from ABC TV Plus.

ABC Entertains, a third digital-only kids channel began on 4 December 2009 as ABC3, however on 3 June 2024 it was rebranded to its current name.

ABC News, a digital news channel began on 22 July 2010.

ABC Kids, a digital shared channel began on 2 May 2011.

=== Special Broadcasting Service ===
SBS Television is a division of the Special Broadcasting Service, founded to provide for the estimated 20% of Australians that speak a language other than English in the home, aiming to complement the ABC.

In recent years SBS TV has begun to target a broader cross-section of the Australian community, in part because of the emergence of specialty subscription television channels aimed at such minorities. In addition to its free-to-air channels, SBS also has an interest in the World Movies Channel which has since been revived on free-to-air TV as SBS World Movies and it relaunched on the 1st of July 2019.

SBS shows many non-English language films with English subtitles, and each morning shows news bulletins in foreign languages from around the world in its WorldWatch timeslot. In addition to this, a great deal of programming from the PBS, Arte, BBC and CBC, and even Comedy Central are shown.

Acquired entertainment programs include the US animated series South Park, Queer as Folk and Inspector Rex. In addition to news and current affairs programming such as SBS World News and Dateline, the network also commissions locally produced documentaries, movies and comedy programs. Less-popular mainstream sports such as soccer, cycling and athletics are also shown.

SBS currently broadcasts six channels: SBS, known as 'SBS One' between 2009 and 2015, SBS Viceland, known as SBS Two between 2009 and 2016, SBS World Movies, SBS Food, known as Food Network Australia between 2015 and 2018, NITV, also known as National Indigenous Television (see National Indigenous Television and more info about this channel in that section), and SBS WorldWatch launched on the 23rd of May of 2022.

=== National Indigenous Television ===
National Indigenous Television, funded by the Commonwealth of Australia, is produced in Sydney and broadcast via Imparja Television's existing satellite capacity.

The idea for a national, indigenous television service was initially conceived by the National Indigenous Radio Service (the peak Indigenous radio group), which initially lobbied the government to start a new, nationwide indigenous television network. Although no major political party championed this cause, commercial broadcaster Imparja Television stated in 2004 that it would run such a network, at least within its own licence area. In 2005 the federal Department of Communications, Information Technology and the Arts considered funding such a station, and conducted a review process.

On 13 July 2007 NITV launched, replacing Indigenous Community Television on the Optus Aurora remote satellite service.

On 12 December 2012 NITV was launched on free to air on which was the 4th digital channel of SBS, making this channel available to all Australians wherever SBS digital television is broadcast.

== Commercial television ==
Australia's television licence areas post-1980s aggregation.

In order to allow for commercial licensing, the country was divided into a number of licence areas. When these were drawn up in the 1950s, each major city or regional area – about 50 in all – was considered its own market region. In each of the five major capitals, three commercial licences were granted (the exception being Perth which did not receive its third commercial station until 1988), while smaller cities or regions were granted a single licence. Under this arrangement, the regional stations would cherry-pick programming from the networks that evolved in the major cities and held a local monopoly in their own licence areas. Some regional stations would also form partnerships and local networks of their own.

The process of aggregation began in 1989. Regional markets were merged and (usually) three licences were granted in the new, aggregated areas, with the exception of Tasmania and Remote Central & Eastern Australia, which were granted two licences. As some markets were formed by the merger of up to six different individual markets, this meant that some stations had to merge or form partnerships in order to remain competitive. Around the same time, many remote market regions were replaced with two satellite market regions – one for regional Western Australia, and one for Remote Central & Eastern Australia – although each of these regions was only granted two licences.

Some television markets remained non-aggregated. These were granted a second licence, sometimes to the same company that owned the existing licence. Markets with two broadcasters were later granted a third licence, to a joint venture company formed as a partnership of the two existing broadcasters; markets with one broadcaster in South Australia and Griffith, NSW were also granted a third licence to the same company that owned the existing two licences.

=== Metropolitan ===
There are three commercial metropolitan networks, the Seven Network, Nine Network and Network 10. Originally, the networks operated within metropolitan areas, but have expanded into regional areas through the acquisition of local affiliate broadcasters.

Seven Network

- Headquarters & Main studio: Eveleigh, Sydney
- National play-out centre: Frenchs Forest, Sydney (joint venture with Nine)

Nine Network

- Headquarters & Main studio: North Sydney
- National play-out centre: Frenchs Forest, Sydney (joint venture with Seven)

Network 10

- Headquarters, Main studio & National play-out centre: Pyrmont, Sydney

=== Regional and remote ===
The population of Australians living outside of metropolitan areas are served by a number of regional television networks that are affiliated with a metropolitan counterpart. Before the 1980s, regional stations were mostly independent with some forming loose partnerships and others merging into local networks. However, the Hawke Labor government introduced a system known as aggregation – regional television equalisation – which would provide viewers with the same viewing choices as those in the metropolitan cities. Consequently, the regional stations and networks continued to merge and expand, and became affiliated with one of the three metropolitan networks. Further equalisation later occurred in the 2000s – with the advent of digital television – to areas that escaped initial aggregation.

Today, WIN Television and Imparja Television notably remain independent, whereas broadcasters like Prime Television, the Golden West Network, Sunshine Television, NBN Television and Southern Cross Television have been absorbed by the metropolitan networks over the years.

As with some of the metropolitan stations, local content is present only in the form of local news bulletin or local advertising. The amount of local news provided varies from two-minute updates to full-hour, seven nights a week news bulletins.

=== Current ownership ===
Commercial stations in metropolitan markets (Sydney, Melbourne, Brisbane, Adelaide, Perth), in addition to many regional markets, are owned and operated by their respective network. In some regional and remote markets, the stations are owned by an affiliate broadcaster.

Some regional and remote markets have one operator holding a monopoly over all three networks, with two stations of the three operating under supplementary licences. Other regional markets have only two operators — each owned by or affiliated with a respective network — who have formed a joint venture station to operate under a supplementary licence and broadcast the remaining third network. (Note: The third network stations in monopoly and joint venture areas are supplementary licences given through Section 38B of the Broadcasting Services Act 1992. These were once commonly referred to as "digital only" services, as they were not available on analogue television. The second network stations in monopoly areas are supplementary licences given through Section 38A of the Broadcasting Services Act 1992.)

Affiliated stations
Affiliate-owned	Supplementary licence, monopoly market	Supplementary licence, joint venture market

Licence areas Sub-markets	Seven Network and affiliates	Nine Network and affiliates	Network 10 and affiliates
New South Wales
Sydney; Metropolitan area (including Central Coast and Blue Mountains)	Seven Sydney	Nine Sydney	10 Sydney
Northern NSW (Note: While there are several areas where viewers can receive programmes from more than one licence area, the Central Coast, Gold Coast and Sunshine Coast are special cases. Each has dedicated transmitters, on the same tower, for two different regions. Two sets of commercial stations produce dedicated feeds for the Gold Coast.); Newcastle, Central Coast, Coffs Harbour, Tamworth, Taree, Lismore, Gold Coast (QLD)	Seven Northern NSW	Nine Northern NSW; WIN Corporation	10 Northern NSW
Southern NSW; Wollongong, Canberra (ACT), Wagga Wagga, Orange, Dubbo	Seven Southern NSW	Nine Southern NSW; WIN Corporation	10 Southern NSW
Griffith and Murrumbidgee Irrigation Area (Note: One broadcaster has a monopoly in this area, as it was determined during aggregation that this area cannot support more than one commercial television broadcaster.) (Note: This rural area was not aggregated during the early nineties, unlike most rural areas, but was granted multiple commercial services over time. This market is now primarily of historic significance.)	Seven Griffith; WIN Corporation	Nine Griffith; WIN Corporation	No service (Note: 10 Griffith and 10 SA ceased broadcasting Network 10 programming on 9 October 2026.)
Victoria
Melbourne; Metropolitan area (including Geelong)	Seven Melbourne	Nine Melbourne	10 Melbourne
Regional Victoria; Ballarat, Bendigo, Albury (NSW), Shepparton, Traralgon	Seven Victoria	Nine Victoria; WIN Corporation	10 Victoria
Mildura/Sunraysia	Seven Mildura	Nine Mildura; WIN Corporation	No service (Note: Mildura Digital Television ceased broadcasting Network 10 programming in Mildura on 30 June 2024.)
Queensland
Brisbane; Metropolitan area (including Gold Coast and southern Sunshine Coast)	Seven Brisbane	Nine Brisbane	10 Brisbane
Regional Queensland; Townsville, Cairns, Sunshine Coast, Toowoomba, Rockhampton, Mackay, Maryborough	Seven Queensland	Nine Queensland; WIN Corporation	10 Queensland
South Australia
Adelaide; Metropolitan area (including Murray Bridge, Adelaide Hills, Victor Harbor and central Yorke Peninsula)	Seven Adelaide	Nine Adelaide	10 Adelaide
Spencer Gulf	Seven Spencer Gulf	Nine Spencer Gulf; Seven Media	10 Spencer Gulf; Seven Media
Broken Hill, NSW	Seven Spencer Gulf	Nine Spencer Gulf; Seven Media	10 Spencer Gulf; Seven Media
Mount Gambier/South East	Seven SA; WIN Corporation	Nine SA; WIN Corporation	No service
Riverland	Seven SA; WIN Corporation	Nine SA; WIN Corporation	No service
Western Australia
Perth; Metropolitan area (including Mandurah)	Seven Perth	Nine Perth	10 Perth
Remote and Regional WA (Note: Transmission is via satellite for remote areas, and via terrestrial broadcast for more developed areas.); Bunbury and Albany, Geraldton, Mandurah, Kalgoorlie, Remote Western Zone	Seven Regional WA	Nine WA; WIN Corporation	10 WA; West Digital Television
Other Regional/Remote Areas
Tasmania; Hobart, Launceston	Seven Tasmania	Nine Tasmania; WIN Corporation	10 Tasmania; Tasmanian Digital Television
Darwin (including Batchelor)	Seven Darwin	Nine Darwin; WIN Corporation	10 Darwin; Darwin Digital Television
Remote Central & Eastern Australia (including Alice Springs, Mount Isa, Katherine and Tennant Creek; remote areas of all states and territories except WA)	Seven Central	Imparja; Imparja Television	10 Central; Central Digital Television

== Community broadcasting ==
In 1993 the Australian Broadcasting Authority allocated licences for a sixth television channel for non-profit community and educational use on a trial basis. The groundwork for community television was laid in the Broadcasting Services Act 1992, which defined a new service category, community television, for the first time.

Prospective community television providers were invited to apply for transmitter licences, which were granted to groups in Sydney, Melbourne, Brisbane, Adelaide and Lismore. In February, 1995, the West Australian Community Broadcasting Association was appointed to manage access to the sixth channel in Perth and Mandurah on behalf of groups based in the two cities.

Licences were also granted in 1996 to Hobart Access Community Television Inc in Hobart and Bendigo Community Television Inc in Bendigo however these were not renewed. Similarly, a licence for BushVision in Mount Gambier was granted in 2005, but it later lapsed. Permanent licences for Sydney, Melbourne, Brisbane and Perth were allocated in 2004, while trial licences remain in effect in Adelaide and Lismore.

The Australian Community Television Alliance, established in March 2008 is the national representative organisation for community television. The CEO of TVS Sydney, Laurie Patton, is the Secretary and represents ACTA on the Federal Government's Digital Switchover Taskforce Industry Advisory Group. In addition to these, a number of community groups produce programming in regional areas, including Queanbeyan Canberra Television (QCTV) in Canberra, Hunter Community Television in Newcastle, Illawarra Community Television (ICTV) in Wollongong and WARP Television in Bathurst.

Groups in a number of areas including Ballarat and Victor Harbor have unsuccessfully applied for licences. Aurora Community Television, Australian Multicultural Television, Ballarat Community Cable Television, Channel Vision (Canberra) and Satellite Community TV, although not licensed as community stations, provide similar services.

Community Television stations went digital in 2010. However, in September 2014 Australian federal communications minister Malcolm Turnbull announced that licensing for community television stations would end in December 2015. In September 2015, Turnbull, now Prime Minister, announced an extension of the deadline to 31 December 2016. The deadline was further extended incrementally by communications minister Mitch Fifield until June 2021, however by 2015 Sydney's Television Sydney had ceased broadcasting, as had Brisbane's 31 Digital, switching to a short-live online streaming service. As of January 2021, the only remaining community television stations in Australia still broadcasting are Melbourne's C31 and Adelaide's Channel 44.

== Subscription television ==
As of August 2025 the following information is incorrect. Foxtel is the only provider that provides "traditional" subscription TV via satellite television, they also provide an IPTV version through a proprietary set top box. FetchTV also provides IPTV subscription TV, while TPG has since dropped this service.

Two of the three major providers of subscription television in Australia carry a common service; however they have a number of differences. Foxtel currently 'controls' the common service that Optus resell. This service is known as the Foxtel Platform.

Austar broadcast into all of regional Australia (except Western Australia), Tasmania and Darwin while Foxtel broadcast in all capital cities, the Gold Coast, the Central Coast and all of Western Australia until mid-2012 when Foxtel/Austar merged hence Foxtel gaining the Austar coverage areas. Optus Television operates only in the small parts of Sydney, Melbourne, Brisbane and Adelaide where it has laid cable.

SelecTV was the fourth provider of subscription television controlled by WIN Corporation. SelecTV was available throughout Australia via satellite and focused on providing content in comparatively low priced packages to a number of specialised market segments; including Spanish, Greek, and Italian. As of January 2011, the service is no longer available.

There are two small region-based subscription television providers; TransTV Digital which is available in Canberra; and Neighbourhood Cable based in Ballarat, and also available in Geelong & Mildura.

There are also a number of satellite services that target specific language speaking groups, the largest being UBI World TV, a non-English language service. Globecast TV and Pan Global TV are non-English language, Christian and sport channel platforms that are controlled by Globecast. Various operators run their own subscription services on these platforms. In addition, there are other satellite subscription services available through other providers.

== Datacasting ==
Datacasting in Australia began as a test transmission in Sydney using one of the reserved digital spectrum positions. Australian broadcast infrastructure company Broadcast Australia undertook the three-year trial using the DVB-T system. The trial consisted of a number of services on one standard 7 MHz multiplex, collectively known as Digital Forty Four. The service was extended past the three-year period, but ended in March 2010

The services included; a combined program guide for the free-to-air broadcasters, named Channel 4; a news, sport, and weather datacast channel provided by the Australian Broadcasting Corporation; a government and public information channel, known as Channel NSW, which included real time traffic information and surf webcams; the Australian Christian Channel; the Expo Channel; and various federal parliamentary audio broadcasts.

Today, datacasting consists of information based channels that are broadcast as subchannels of the existing commercial broadcasters. As of mid 2013, these broadcast mainly infomercials. Examples include TVSN and 4ME.

== Narrowcasting ==
There are currently five open-narrowcast services in Australia:

- Aboriginal TV & TVNT – Darwin – link
- Goolarri Television (GTV) – Broome – link
- Indigenous Community Television (ICTV) – Alice Springs
- Ngarda Community Television and Radio – Roebourne, Western Australia
- Snowy Mountains Television (SMTV) – Jindabyne, New South Wales

One of the narrowcast services, Indigenous Community Television (ICTV), is available to satellite users across Australia via the VAST service.

Aboriginal Television, GTV and Ngarda TV are local Indigenous-owned services that broadcast only to their home market. SMTV is also restricted to its home market of Jindabyne.

== Amateur broadcasting ==
The Australian amateur radio bands include frequencies standard televisions can receive, which have led to amateur radio operators making use of this by broadcasting video.

The frequency overlap occurs roughly where television channel 16 lies. Typically, channel 16 is used for amateur television transmissions; however, other frequencies are sometimes utilized, especially those used by satellite television services. Most transmissions can be viewed and heard on an analogue television, but some transmissions require additional or other equipment.

=== New South Wales ===
Television Gladesville (VK2TVG) in Sydney conducts three test transmissions per week on Channel 16, including a three-hour live to air program on Wednesday nights.

The Central Coast Amateur Radio Club also has an amateur television repeater (VK2RTG) on Channel 16.

VK2RTS broadcasts from Lawson near Katoomba on Channel 16. Club activity is on Mondays between 8 and 10pm. A Voice liaison and control frequency of 147.325 MHz (+600 kHz duplex) is used.

VK2RFM broadcasts from Oakdale near Camden on 1250 MHz FM which can be viewed with an analog satellite receiver. Club activity is Tuesdays between 8 and 10pm. The liaison and control frequency is 147.400 MHz simplex.

Both repeaters cover the entire Sydney basin. They are operated by the Sydney Amateur Television Group and may be activated and used at any time from the control channels.

UHF TV Channel 35 was used until July 2001 when the Australian Communications and Media Authority reassigned the channel for digital television.

=== Victoria (2 Digital ATV Channels) ===
VK3RTV is Melbourne's main amateur television station, and is available via Channel 16 at the lower end of the UHF TV Band (below channel 28). The amateur television repeater is located on Mount Dandenong.

There are a small number of amateur television enthusiasts (amateur radio operators with Television transmitting equipment) who transmit to Melbourne and surrounds via VK3RTV.

These include VK3AAZ, VK3AOB, VK3AGJ, VK3BFG, VK3BCU, VK3CH, VK3CRG, VK3FMD, VK3GMZ, VK3IV, VK3JDA, VK3JDG, VK3KBL, VK3KHB, VK3KOS, VK3LA, VK3MN, VK3PB, VK3TMS, VK3TVZ, VK3XOK, VK3XKD and VK3XZA.

VK3RTV is now a 2-channel digital television facility on 446 MHz. The new system features two standard definition digital channels.

Bendigo in Central Victoria also has an Amateur Television Transmitter (VK3RBO) on the 13 cm band. This can be received using surplus microwave dishes and downconverters. The station is known to show episodes of the Amateur Television Program 'Amateurlogic'.

=== Queensland ===
Amateur television in Queensland had its beginnings in the late 1970s, after a group of local Ham radio enthusiasts showed interests in setting up their own television repeater, although this would not occur until the 1980s. For several years, broadcasters had to rely on a low-powered repeater located in Brisbane's northern suburbs, but eventually permissions were granted to have a more advanced and more central repeater constructed within the inner-city suburb of Spring Hill.

In 1990, Brisbane's Amateur Television club provided a two-way television system for Lamington National Park during the park's 75th anniversary celebrations. In October that year, amateur television history was made when broadcasters VK4BOB and VK4XRL transmitted video to Sydney's ATV clubs which was relayed by the AUSSAT satellite.

Various transmitters continue to broadcast to this day. Some Queensland ATV transmitters are located in the outer-Brisbane suburbs of Ocean View and Wamuran. In November 2012, the Ocean View site will begin its first digital transmission test.

In 2014, the Spring Hill repeater was demolished.

== See also ==
- Australian Broadcasting Corporation
- History of broadcasting in Australia
- List of people in communications and media in Australia
- List of radio stations in Australia
