= Hitchhike TV =

Hitchhike TV was a community television station based in Brisbane, Australia. Originally known as Briz 31, the station existed in various forms from 1992 until its closure in 2019.

== History ==
=== 1994–2017: Brisbane community television ===
31 Digital
- Country: Australia
- Broadcast area: Brisbane, surrounding areas

Programming
- Language: English
- Picture format: 576i (SDTV) 16:9

Ownership
- Owner: Briz 31 Ltd

History
- Launched: 31 July 1994; 32 years ago
- Closed: 30 April 2019; 7 years ago
- Replaced by: Queensland Online TV (website) now Hitchhike TV
- Former names: Briz 31 (1994–2006); Channel 31 (2006–2008); QCTV (2008–2010); 31 Digital (2010–2017)

Links
- Website: www.31.com.au

Availability

Terrestrial
- DVB-T: 32
- Freeview (virtual): 44

Brisbane's first community television channel was formed by Wes Tatters, Ric Adams, Simon Bunker, Ben Morrisson and Cait Spreadborough. The station began broadcasting a two-week test transmission in 1992 during the opening of South Bank Parklands, under the name Briz TV. During the broadcast week many different formats produced by the members went to air. Along with live footage from the opening of South Bank, member-produced formats included a variety show On the Bed with Simon and Karen where guests were invited to a studio in their pyjamas and be interviewed by the hosts.

The following two years were spent lobbying the Australian Broadcasting Authority (ABA) for permission to broadcast on a full-time basis and developing a draft funding model for the organisation. At that time, there were no licence categories available except the experimental broadcasting category.

The station began broadcasting in the Brisbane area from Vulture Street Studios on 31 July 1994 as Briz 31 on analogue channel 31 (callsign CTQ-31) after an arrangement was struck with Telstra to provide broadcasting facilities at the ABQ-2 transmitter tower on Mount Coot-tha. With the lack of a marketing campaign to drive brand awareness at the time, many people confusingly called it "Bruce 31".

During Briz 31's early years daily programming consisted of Community Billboard, a text-based information service consisting of weather, local news and classifieds. Regular programming would begin from 4pm usually consisting of locally produced content and public domain films. Notable programmes from this era included Crazy Crosswords, a crossword puzzle game show interlaced with self-aware humour and Tamara Tonite, a long-running variety show hosted by titular Brisbane drag queen which continued into 2004. As Briz 31 moved into the 2000s, regular programming eventually took up the channel's daytime slot and the station was successfully given a permanent broadcasting license by the ABA in 2004. A nightly news bulletin produced by the Queensland University of Technology's journalism school was broadcast on the channel, as well as current affairs programmes by Deutsche Welle.

To reflect its expansion into other parts of Queensland outside of Brisbane, the station was renamed Channel 31 in October 2006. In 2007 the station had a major transmitter upgrade, which allowed it to reach another 40% of viewers mainly in Ipswich and the surrounding areas. In July 2008 the station was renamed QCTV for "Queensland Community Television". In November 2009 the station announced their intent return to the "31" name and was renamed 31 QCTV before being renamed simply 31 in April 2010. The station had announced in March 2010 that after a long period of uncertainty it would begin broadcasting in digital by 7 June 2010, and upon launching on digital channel 44 (broadcast on 529.500 MH) on 7 June 2010, the station was renamed 31 Digital.

The station's analogue broadcast later ceased on 15 May 2011.

In September 2014, Australian federal communications minister Malcolm Turnbull announced that licensing for community television stations would end in December 2015. In September 2015, Turnbull, now Prime Minister, announced an extension of the deadline to 31 December 2016. The deadline was again extended to 30 June 2017 by Minister for Communications Mitch Fifield in December 2016.

Leading up to the various deadlines, 31 Digital, like other community television stations, moved operations online, and streamed its channel live on their website which allows access to viewers outside of its traditional broadcast area. 31 Digital ceased broadcasting on television at 11:59 pm on 28 February 2017. Days before 30 June 2017, the deadline was again extended to 31 December 2017 by Fifield, but 31 Digital had already ceased broadcasting.

=== 2017–2019: Online service ===
With the close of terrestrial broadcasting, the channel shifted its focus to online video on demand and reinvented itself as Queensland Online TV (also known as Q Online TV). Sports discussion program The Commentary Box was released via Facebook on 27 February 2017 as the inaugural show under the new re-branding. The show featured three fans discussing the highlights of the previous week, with a Queensland focus.

In June 2018, the service was rebranded as Hitchhike TV, returning to a linear streaming service with the video on demand element removed. Hitchhike TV streamed legacy 31 Digital content from their website in short two-hour programming blocks with an announcement it would eventually become a 24-hour streaming service. However, the service was discontinued in 2019 with no official statement.

== Legacy ==
On 31 July 2024, marking the 30th anniversary of when Briz 31 went to air, Brisbane YouTuber "IBIS Channel 32" released a documentary about the TV station.

== Programming ==
=== Produced in-house ===
- Crazy Crosswords (1994–1996)
- The Bike Show
- Getting Together
- Behind The Scenes
- A&V
- Karaoke Kangaroo
- Alien Television Workshop
- Clips 31
- Tamara Tonite
- Art Studio
- The Boat Show
- The Late Nite Show with Scott Black
- This Town Brisbane
- The Storyteller (1995–1996)
- Community Billboard (1994–2002)
- The Commentary Box (2017)

=== Other programming ===
- Hot Dog with the Lot
- Harness Racing
- Underground Sounds
- 4WDTV
- Queensland Pro Wrestling
- QUT News – a news bulletin produced by Queensland University of Technology
- My Autistic Brother – A show created to raise autistic awareness

== Identity history ==
31 Digital

- 1994–1999: Getting Together
- 2006–2008: Your local television
- 2008–2009: Queensland's Only Community Television Station
- 2010–2017: Your stories... Your station

Queensland Online TV

- 2017–2018: Q Online. Local. Always.

Hitchhike TV

- 2018–2020: Locally Sourced. Crafted with Love.

== See also ==
- Community television in Australia
- Television broadcasting in Australia
