= Channel 44 (Adelaide) =

Community television station in Adelaide, South Australia

- Country: Australia
- Broadcast area: Adelaide, surrounding areas
- Headquarters: Collinswood, South Australia

Programming
- Language: English
- Picture format: 576i (SDTV) 16:9

Ownership
- Owner: C44 Adelaide Ltd

History
- Launched: 23 April 2004; 22 years ago
- Replaced: ACE TV
- Former names: C31 Adelaide (2004–2010); 44 Adelaide (2010–2014)

Links
- Website: c44.com.au

Availability

Terrestrial
- DVB-T: 33
- Freeview (virtual): 44

Channel 44 (C44, call-sign CTS33) is a free-to-air community television channel in Adelaide, South Australia. C44 features locally and nationally made content and has been broadcasting since 23 April 2004. Previously known as C31 when on analogue television, C44 made the switch to digital on 5 November 2010 and switched off its analogue signal on 31 May 2012. C44 airs a range of local, interstate and international content that is relevant to the local community.

== History ==
Before C44, Adelaide's community television station was ACE TV, run by Adelaide Community and Education Television Inc. ACE TV held a temporary licence from May 1994 until December 2002, when it was cancelled due to breaches of its licence conditions. ACE TV had its last broadcast in May 2002.

In 2003, after ACE TV's closure, C31 Adelaide Ltd received the community television licence for Adelaide. Its station, called C31 Adelaide (C31), launched on 23 April 2004 on analogue channel UHF 31. In 2004, most community TV services in capital cities received permanent licences from the Australian Communications & Media Authority (ACMA). However, the process for allocating a permanent licence in Adelaide, which began in 2004, was terminated in mid-2006; the two prospective applicants (of which C31 was one) were declined for different reasons.

On 5 November 2010, the station was moved to digital channel 44 and was renamed 44 Adelaide, with its analogue signal switched off on 31 May 2012. 44 Adelaide received a new logo in 2013 and was later renamed Channel 44 (C44) in 2014.

In September 2014, Australian federal communications minister Malcolm Turnbull announced that licensing for community television stations would end in December 2015. In September 2015, Turnbull, then Prime Minister, announced an extension of the deadline to 31 December 2016.

In April 2016, the channel started moving operations online, streaming its channel live on their website. The move online means that local content can now be viewed by those outside Adelaide.

The license due to expire on 31 December 2016 was extended twice at the last minute by Minister for Communications Mitch Fifield, first to 30 June 2017, and later to 31 December 2017. Fifield made an additional extension to 30 June 2018 as part of the government's deal with the Nick Xenophon Team to garner support for large-scale media reforms in the Senate, while a further extension, announced on 1 June 2018, gave broadcasters an additional two years through 30 June 2020.

In June 2020, a 12-month extension was granted by the federal government at the last minute, and in June 2021, they were given a 3-year extension a week before expiry, thanks to amendments tabled by South Australian Senator Rex Patrick.

In 2024 the legislation was changed to allow Channel 44 to stay on the air until such time as the ACMA decides to reallocate its broadcast spectrum for another purpose.

== Partnership with SAFC ==
The South Australian Film Corporation's First Nations Advisory Committee was launched in November 2020 as part of their First Nations Screen Strategy 2020–2025, in partnership with Channel 44.

== Identity history ==
- 2010–2016: Bringing You the Community through TV
- 2016–present: Adelaide – It's Your 44

== See also ==
- Community television in Australia
- Television broadcasting in Australia
