= Rove =

Rove may refer to:

== Places ==
- Le Rove, a commune in the Bouches-du-Rhône department in southern France
- Rove, Honiara, a suburb of Honiara, Solomon Islands
- Rove, Vojnik, a settlement in the hills east of Frankolovo in the Municipality of Vojnik in eastern Slovenia
- Rove, Zagorje ob Savi, a village northwest of Zagorje ob Savi in central Slovenia
- Rove Formation, geological formation in upper northeastern part of Cook County, Minnesota, United States, extending into Ontario, Canada
- Rove Tunnel, a canal tunnel in France that connected Marseille to the Rhône river opened in 1927 and closed in 1963.

== People ==
- Rove McManus (born 1974), Australian TV and radio host
  - Rove (TV series), formerly Rove Live, was an Australian television variety show
  - Rove Live Radio, Australian radio programme from 2002 to 2004 hosted by Rove McManus
  - Rove LA, Australian television comedy talk show set in Los Angeles
- Karl Rove (born 1950), American political strategist
- Kristiina Rove (born 1990), Finnish alpine ski racer
- Olavi Rove (1915–1966), Finnish gymnast and Olympic champion

== Others ==
- Rove beetle, members of the short-winged beetle family Staphylinidae
  - Pictured rove beetle (Thinopinus pictus), wingless rove beetle which lives on the West Coast of the United States from southern Alaska to Baja California
- Rove goat, a breed of goat
- Rove Digital, Estonian IT company which gained fame as a producer of copious amounts of spam, and as a major distributor of trojans
- Rove, the past participle of the verb "reeve", a nautical term meaning to thread a line through blocks in order to gain a mechanical advantage
