= Ron Steward =

Australian media personality (1928–2019)

- Born: 2 January 1928; Australia
- Died: 19 January 2019 (aged 91)
- Occupations: Film and television critic.
- Years active: 1940s-2006
- Known for: Film critic on Rove Live

Ron Steward (2 January 1928 – 19 January 2019) was a TV critic and film reviewer.

== Biography ==
Stewart started his career in the industry in the 1940s, and he packed films on trains going out to Paramount Pictures, he retired from this role in 1991.

Steward was first discovered by Rove McManus at the 2004 ARIA Awards, where he made his modeling debut. Steward was later a regular of McManus' radio program, Rove Live Radio. McManus signed him to Roving Enterprises in February 2005. In 2005 and 2006, he presented a segment on Rove Live called Ron's Review, regularly appearing with Peter Helliar who also reviewed each film.
