= Skithouse =

- Logo
- Starring: Peter Helliar; Corinne Grant; Damian Callinan; Scott Brennan; Michael Chamberlin; Fiona Harris; Roz Hammond; Tom Gleeson; Cal Wilson; Jason Geary; Ben Anderson; Tripod
- Country of origin: Australia
- Original language: English
- No. of seasons: 2
- No. of episodes: 19

Production
- Running time: 22–24 minutes

Original release
- Network: Network Ten
- Release: 9 February 2003 – 28 July 2004

Skithouse (styled skitHOUSE) is an Australian sketch comedy television series that ran on Network Ten from 9 February 2003 to 28 July 2004. The series was produced by Roving Enterprises. It featured many well-known Australian comedians, including comedy-band Tripod. Reruns can now be seen on The Comedy Channel on Foxtel. In the UK, it is shown on the channel Paramount Comedy 2 and Trouble. The title name itself is a pun on the colloquialism "shithouse".

The series only ran for two seasons, before being cancelled due to a combination of dwindling ratings and the withdrawal of the cable network Foxtel as co-financier of the program's production.

== Cast ==
Skithouse was produced by Roving Enterprises, a production company formed by Rove McManus. Two key performers were Rove's Rove Live co-hosts Peter Helliar and Corinne Grant. The show also featured Cal Wilson, Scott Brennan, Fiona Harris, Damian Callinan, Roz Hammond, Michael Chamberlin, Ingrid Bloom, Tom Gleeson, Jason Geary and Ben Anderson. Members of the comedic band Tripod also featured, not just as the band but in the actual skits as well. Tripod are Scod (Scott Edgar), Yon (Simon Hall) and Gatesy (Steven Gates).

The director was Full Frontal alumna, Daina Reid.

Since the cancellation of the series, a number of the stars have moved on to other areas in the comedy industry. Scott Brennan and Fiona Harris starred in Comedy Inc. (before the show's end) as well as Damian Callinan and Cal Wilson staying on Network Ten on The Wedge with Roz Hammond and Ben Anderson as part of the ensemble cast on Thank God You're Here. Tom Gleeson has gone on to host popular ABCTV quiz show, "Hard Quiz" which he has been the host of since October 2016.

== The show ==
The show consisted of numerous comedic skits. The half-hour shows themselves often seemed to have themes (or at least they repeated the use of sets, costumes, characters and props). Its comedic styling was reminiscent of many classic Australian sketch comedies, like Full Frontal and Fast Forward, sharing common elements such as self-depreciating humour, low-cost props and effects.

One sketch depicted a reporter interviewing a group of Iraqi insurgents. One of them notices that, although he is speaking English, his statements are being presented with English subtitles and takes offense at the use of subtitles for his speech. The sketch has been noted for its use of subtitles for humor.

== Notable characters and sketches ==
Many characters recurred throughout the series, often appearing several times in a single episode, creating a semi-coherent storyline. Some more notable recurring characters and/or scenarios are listed below.

The Australian Fast Bowler (Gleeson)
A cricket fast bowler, loosely resembling Dennis Lillee, who uses his bowling skills to help people or defend against evil, superhero style.

Bubble Wrap Man (Yon)
Bubble Wrap Man is a send-up of traditional superheroes. His outfit consisted of a standard red superhero outfit, complete with underwear on the outside, and a bubble wrap cape. Bubble Wrap Man would appear in stressful situations for other unnamed characters, and say to them: "Pop the bubbles on my cape!"

The "I'll Snap Ya" Guy (Callinan)
A parody of an Australian 'bogan' who continually narrates sketches in which he speaks of various people he has punched (or 'snapped').

Redheads (Gleeson, Wilson, Hammond, Yon)
Stereotyped red-haired Caucasian people who have an extreme fear of sunlight. They seem incapable of natural speech, communicating in squeaks.

Batman (Callinan)
A depressed, alcoholic version of Batman. His Batmobile is a wreck, he has no work, and seems romantically attracted to Robin (Chamberlin). He is perpetually at odds with the more dynamic Captain Terrific (Helliar), who is now Robin's partner.

The "I Love Beer" Guy (Helliar)
A man who, despite professing to everyone how much he loves beer, quite obviously cannot stomach the drink. Onlookers try to convince him that it is okay not to drink beer, but he refuses to acknowledge his dislike. This is a mockery of the common stereotype of the beer-drinking Australian male.

The Ticket Lady (Harris)
A perpetually cheerful parking inspector who is oblivious to how much she is hated by the general public; she often speaks highly of people while being pelted with rocks, eggs, and other heavy objects. Usually ends a sketch after having something thrown at her, by exclaiming "I love this job!"

Glenn Bush (Brennan)
An awkward, annoying schoolboy in his teens, with many pimples and a squeaky voice. Glenn is mostly portrayed at school camp in video diary format, or doing a school biology assignment with his "friend" (Chamberlin), who cannot get rid of him.

Tripod as themselves
The three friends engaged in various strange or geeky activities, including playing Dungeons & Dragons, and teaching Yon how to dance.

"Nothing Suss!" (Gleeson, Brennan)
Two men attempt to sell odd products (normally partner exercise equipment) in the medium of an infomercial for their mail-order service. The two frequently use the exercise equipment to demonstrate and end up in sexually suggestive positions, while maintaining all the while that there is "nothing suss" about what they are doing.

The credits of each show are accompanied by a song by Tripod. While sometimes new material is used, it is sometimes a song previously featured in their "Song In An Hour" challenge with Triple J.

== Music and theme ==
The main title was composed by John Von Ahlen and recorded at Subterrane Recording Studio, and the end credits read "Theme by John Von Ahlen for Planet J Productions". The incidental stings were also recorded at Subterrane Recording Studio. The credits of each show are accompanied by a song by Tripod. A compilation of expanded studio versions of these songs was later released as the album Middleborough Rd, which won an ARIA award in 2005 for Best Comedy Release.

== Awards and nominations ==
=== ARIA Music Awards ===
The ARIA Music Awards are a set of annual ceremonies presented by Australian Recording Industry Association (ARIA), which recognise excellence, innovation, and achievement across all genres of the music of Australia. They commenced in 1987.

Year	Nominee / work	Award	Result	Ref.
2005	Classic Skithouse	Best Comedy Release	Nominated	

== See also ==
- Rove Live
- Tripod
