= Tripod (band) =

Australian musical comedy trio

- Tripod promoting 101 Tripod Hits in 2016

Background information
- Origin: Melbourne, Victoria, Australia
- Genres: Acoustic rock, comedy rock
- Years active: 1996–present
- Members: Scod (Scott Edgar); Yon (Simon Hall); Gatesy (Steven Gates)
- Website: 3pod.com.au

Tripod are an Australian musical comedy trio founded by Scod (Scott Edgar), Yon (Simon Hall) and Gatesy (Steven Gates) in 1996. They provide original songs and harmonies, strung together by comic banter.

== History ==
=== Live shows ===
Tripod began as buskers in Melbourne malls, performing a far-fetched prop act of which no record exists. They emerged as a musical act from the thriving Melbourne live music pub scene of the mid-nineties, supporting popular local cover bands in such places as the Station Hotel, The Esplanade, the Central Club, the New Orleans Tavern and the Ritz, St. Kilda. They were very much a cover band at first, performing three part harmony versions on hits by the likes of Elvis Costello, Bowie, the Beach Boys and Queen. They garnered a local following via regular residencies at the Commercial Hotel, Yarraville, just after it stopped being a biker bar.

They soon became regulars at the Prince Patrick Hotel in Collingwood, a Melbourne comedy venue, where they honed their skills in residencies and appearances from 1998 through to its demise in 2003.

Tripod are stalwarts of their home festival, the Melbourne International Comedy Festival, where they often performed since 1997, when they took their pub act and jammed it into a one-hour festival format at St Martins Youth Arts Centre, in a show entitled Welcome to My Wonderwall. They have appeared on music festival stages including the Falls Festival, the Port Fairy Folk Festival, the Queenscliff Music Festival and the Woodford Folk Festival.

Tripod have appeared internationally, including the Montreal Just For Laughs festival and the Upright Citizens Brigade theatre in New York and Los Angeles. They have played the Edinburgh Fringe numerous times.

They have also toured the Australian rural countryside including long stints with the MICF Roadshow.

Tripod alternate the form of their shows between the song-and-sketch cabaret gig format (such as Self Saucing and Men of Substance) and narrative musicals. Their first "story" show was Tripod Tells the Tale of the Adventures of Tosswinkle the Pirate (not very well), which premiered at the MICF before touring nationally.

Their narrative show, Lady Robots, was first previewed at the 2002 Adelaide Fringe Festival before it was performed at the MICF later that year. The show was a musical comedy telling the story of three men who are hurled into space where they come across a planet populated only by Lady Robots. Tripod performed a re-jigged version of the show, Lady Robots v1.1 at the Athenaeum Theatre at the Melbourne International Comedy Festival in 2005, before a national tour culminating in a hit season at the Sydney Opera House. No recordings are known to exist.

On 30 January 2010, Tripod held the world premiere of their comedic musical Tripod versus the Dragon at the Massachusetts Museum of Contemporary Art in North Adams, Massachusetts, United States. Elana Stone co-starred in the production in the role of "The Dungeon Master"/"Dragon" after Megan Washington, who had been co-writing songs for the production, declined the role due to scheduling conflicts. The production is based on the Dungeons & Dragons role-playing game. Tripod went on to perform this show at the Adelaide Fringe Festival, Melbourne International Comedy Festival, the Sydney Opera House, and the Edinburgh Fringe Festival in 2010, as well as subsequent seasons in Perth, Brisbane, regional Victoria and the Przeglad Piosenki Aktorskiej festival in Wroclaw, Poland.

In January 2013, Tripod joined forces with Australian performer Eddie Perfect to create Perfect Tripod, a show of classic Australian songs arranged in four-part harmony, inspired by their cover of Meet Me in the Middle of the Air performed on The Sideshow on 13 October 2007. Perfect Tripod toured concert halls throughout the nation and have collaborated with such Australian pop music greats as Gotye and Missy Higgins.

In October 2014, Tripod performed live at the international gaming convention, PAX (Penny Arcade Expo), in Melbourne at the Melbourne Convention and Exhibition Centre. There they performed a short preview of This Gaming Life, an original collaboration between Tripod, Grammy nominated composer Austin Wintory and the Melbourne Symphony Orchestra.

In 2015 This Gaming Life played to rapturous houses at Hamer Hall, Victorian Arts Centre, with a 55 piece orchestra conducted and arranged by Wintory. The show was a full scale two-act orchestral love letter to the culture and relationships of passionate video gamers, and has been described as the "Stand By Me of the gamer generation."

=== TV ===
The band got their first break appearing on Hey Hey It's Saturday's "Red Faces" contest, where they performed a parodic medley of Oasis hits that demonstrated similarities between the songs.

Their first regular TV appearances were on In Melbourne Tonight (IMT) with Frankie J Holden. Throughout the 1990s and early 2000s they also showed up regularly on such live TV stalwarts as Good Morning Australia with Bert Newton, Denise with Denise Drysdale and popular Saturday morning live rock show Recovery.

Tripod were a feature act in Network Ten's 2003/2004 sketch comedy television show skitHOUSE, writing and performing sketches and songs as part of the core cast.

They performed on Rove/Rove Live in 1999, 2003, and 2004, and were guest programmers of Rage in 2004.

Tripod were also core cast performers on the 2007 ABC weekly variety program The Sideshow.

The group made frequent musical appearances on Network Ten's Good News Week from 2009 to 2011, and have appeared on various ABC1 programs, including Spicks and Specks (May 2011), and Adam Hills Tonight (May 2013).

They have appeared yearly for almost two decades on the Oxfam Melbourne International Comedy Festival Gala.

=== Radio ===
Tripod have appeared as guests throughout their career on popular Australian radio stations.

Their Song-in-an-Hour Challenge (2001–2004) was a popular segment on Triple J's drive-time show with Merrick and Rosso, and later on the Triple J Breakfast show with Wil Anderson and Adam Spencer. In it they had one hour to write and arrange a coherent song based on incoherent listener suggestions and then perform said song to an eager national audience. Tripod often refer to this experience as their songwriting boot camp.

Two CDs containing some of the finest examples of these sessions have been released, each also including recordings taken from live Song-In-An-Hour challenges featured in Tripod's Pod August Nights concerts. In late 2005, they moved to Fox FM where they could be heard on Peter Helliar's weekly Friday morning show, Pete's Show.

=== Podcast ===
On 24 December 2015 Tripod along with host Andrew Pogson started a regular podcast titled Perfectly Good Podcast. Initially started to promote their upcoming 101 Tripod Hits tour, the ongoing series shifted its focus covering any number of topic including current themes or stories from Tripod's 20+ years together. Each podcast centres around a theme in which host Andrew Pogson attempts to keep the members of Tripod to. Tripod also play live or play recordings of their songs which loosely relate to the episode's theme.

Perfectly Good Podcast Song Appearances
101 Hits #	Song	From	Episode Song Appearances
1	A Shandy Too Far	Box Set – 1996	Episode 22 (Live)
2	Adult Contemporary	Men of Substance – 2013	Episode 2 (Live)
3	Air Guitar	The Sideshow – 2007	Episode 53 (live)
4	All I Want	This Gaming Life – 2015	Episode 33 (Live) – featuring Poggo as electric guitar solo via mouth
5	Ancestors	1999	Episode 7 (Live) – a cappella style
6	Aquaman	Perfectly Good Songs – 2007	Episode 27 (Live) – Guitar solo acoustic
7	Astronaut	Middleborough Road – 2004	Episode 2 (Live)
8	Ballad of Ronnie	How to Train an Attack Dog from Scratch – 2007	Episode 27 (Live)
9	Bard	Tripod Versus the Dragon – 2010	Episode 2 (Live) – featuring Yon on Trumpet (with an error and scream), Differences: No Elana Stone
10	The Blueprint	Men of Substance – 2013	Episode 8 (Live)
11	Boggyman	About an Hour of Song-In-An-Hour...Again – 2003	Episode 16 (Recording) – Album version
12	Bubble Helicopter	Tripod Tells the Tale of the Adventures of Tosswinkle the Pirate (Not Very Well) – 2001	Episode 55 (Live)
13	Building an Enid	Tripod Tells the Tale of the Adventures of Tosswinkle the Pirate (Not Very Well) – 2001	
14	Change a Thing	Monster Beach – 2014	Episode 28 (Live)
15	Christ is Born	For the Love of God! – 2008	Episode 1 (Live)
16	Climate Change	Men of Substance – 2013	Episode 26 (Live)
17	Cuckold	Open Slather – 2000	Episode 4 (Live)
18	DILF	Men of Substance – 2013	Episode 15 (live)
19	Do Go On	This Gaming Life – 2015	Episode 32 (Live)
20	Does It Have Guns?	This Gaming Life – 2015	Episode 13 (Recording) – Demo version with synth orchestra
21	Don't Feel Bad	Tripod Versus the Dragon – 2010	Episode 14 (Live) – Differences: No Elana Stone, Yon sings Elana's parts, No Trumpet
22	Drive King	Drive King – 1984	Episode 13 (Recording)
22	Drive King	Drive King – 1984	Episode 52 (Live) – featuring Andrew Pogson on Blaxophone
23	Enid	Tripod Tells the Tale of the Adventures of Tosswinkle the Pirate (Not Very Well) – 2001	Episode 33 (Live) – Gatesy accidentally sings one of Yon's part
24	Fabian	Fegh Maha – 2004	Episode 45 (Live) – Instrumental only / Jamming with Poggo
25	Fear of Shorts	Pod August Night – 2006	Episode 20 (Live)
26	Fly So High	Middleborough Road – 2004	Episode 34 (Live)
27	Gay Bar	Men of Substance – 2013	Episode 5 (Live)
28	Ghost Ship	Tripod Tells the Tale of the Adventures of Tosswinkle the Pirate (Not Very Well) – 2001	Episode 10 (Live) – Yon struggles to clear his throat, Scod asks if his OK and Gatesy comments that Yon is dying
29	The Gods Are People Too	Tripod Versus the Dragon – 2010	Episode 3 (Live)
29	The Gods Are People Too	Tripod Versus the Dragon – 2010	Episode 44 (Live) – featuring Andrew Pogson on the Blaxophone
29	The Gods Are People Too	Tripod Versus the Dragon – 2010	Episode 44.1 (Live) – Rehearsal take, featuring Andrew Pogson on the Blaxophone
30	Gonna Make You Happy Tonight	Middleborough Road – 2004	Episode 15 (Live) – Different time signature and groove. Improv different game ending
31	Good Friends	This Gaming Life – 2015	
32	Goodbye Little Alarm Clock	About an Hour of Song in an Hour – 2002	Episode 29 (Live) – A number of mistake due to Tripod not knowing the song very well
33	Head of Zombie	This Gaming Life – 2015	
34	Hey Ho	ca 1650s	Episode 21 (Live)
35	The Hog Dog Man	Fegh Maha – 2004	Episode 12 (Recording) – Album version
36	Hot Girl in the Comic Shop	Live at Woodford – 2008	Episode 30 (Live) – Differences: Live "Oooo Haaa"
37	I Always Get into Stuff	Middleborough Road – 2004	Episode 53 (Live) – featuring Andrew Pogson on Blaxophone
38	I Had to Pay My Debt to the Devil	How to Train an Attack Dog from Scratch – 2007	Episode 3 (Live)
38	I Had to Pay My Debt to the Devil	How to Train an Attack Dog from Scratch – 2007	Episode 24 (Live)
39	I Hate this Place	Monster Beach – 2014	Episode 31 (Live)
40	I Hate Your Family	Open Slather (Christmas Edition) – 2000	Episode 7 (Live) – Differences: Improv Easter theme lyrics, Yon finishes with "anything for love"
41	I Will Be There	Open Slather – 2000	Episode 42 (Live) – Differences: No trumpet, Gatesy says wrong line
42	I Will Still Play	Tripod Versus the Dragon – 2010	Episode 14 (Live)
42	I Will Still Play	Tripod Versus the Dragon – 2010	Episode 49A (Live) [Patreon exclusive] – No Gatesy, featuring Andrew Pogson doing Blaxophone
43	If I Had a Tattoo	Middleborough Road – 2004	Episode 20 (Live) – Differences: No repeat of song
44	IKEA	Open Slather – 2000	Episode 41 (Live)
45	In the Countryside	Middleborough Road – 2004	Episode 5 (Live)
46	Is it Okay if I Stalk You?	Open Slather – 2000	Episode 30 (Live) – Differences: Laughing due to Yon noises
47	Ivory Tower	Tripod Versus the Dragon – 2010	Episode 11 (Recording) – Album version
47	Ivory Tower	Tripod Versus the Dragon – 2010	Episode 11 (Recording) – Megan Washington's first demo
47	Ivory Tower	Tripod Versus the Dragon – 2010	Episode 65 (Live) No second verse, No Elana Stone
48	Je Veux Te Dire	Middleborough Road – 2004	
49	Jeboticabal	Perfectly Good Songs – 2007	Episode 4 (Live) – Differences: Yon accidentally says "Aracataca" once
50	Jokes! Jokes! Jokes!	Assassin's Creed Syndicate – 2015	Episode 34 (Live)
51	Kempt	Fegh Maha – 2004	Episode 4 (Recording) – Album version
52	Key Party	How to Train an Attack Dog from Scratch – 2007	Episode 5 (Live)
52	Key Party	How to Train an Attack Dog from Scratch – 2007	Episode 24 (live)
53	King Kong	Songs from Self Saucing – 2006	Episode 31 (live) – Poggo talks to Yon during middle of the song, no other movies are talked about like in Self Saucing
54	Krap Karate	Fegh Maha – 2004	
55	Let's Take a Walk	Middleborough Road – 2004	Episode 50 (Live) – featuring MSO strings and Andrew Pogson on Blaxophone
56	Lingering Dad	Men of Substance – 2013	Episode 7 (Live)
56	Lingering Dad	Men of Substance – 2013	Episode 39 (live) – Scod narrates over M.A.S.H. theme
57	The Lonesome/Gregarious Cowboy	Fegh Maha – 2004	Episode 55 (Live)
58	The Love of 3 Men	The Sideshow – 2007	Episode 54 (Live)
59	Love Song	Open Slather – 2000	
60	Main Theme from Tosswinkle the Pirate	Tripod Tells the Tale of the Adventures of Tosswinkle the Pirate (Not Very Well) – 2001	Episode 6 (Live)
61	Melbourne Girl	Pod August Night – 2006	Episode 8 (Live)
62	The Messenger's Dream	Live at Woodford – 2008	Episode 36 (Live)
63	Mucus	Open Slather – 2000	Episode 59 (Live) – Different taking bits to Open Slather version. Reflect on what they use to do.
64	No Daughter of Mine	Songs from Self Saucing – 2006	Episode 21 (Live)
65	Old Money	Middleborough Road – 2004	Episode 28 (Live)
65	Old Money	Middleborough Road – 2004	Episode 50 x2 (Live) – featuring MSO strings and Andrew Pogson on Blaxophone
66	On Behalf of All the Geeks	Middleborough Road – 2004	
67	On Paper	Tripod Versus the Dragon – 2010	
68	One More Annoying Couple	Men of Substance – 2013	Episode 31 (Live)
69	The Only Shepherd	Perfectly Good Songs – 2007	Episode 1 (Live)
70	Overtune	Tripod Versus the Dragon – 2010	Episode 38 (Live) – featuring Andrew Pogson doing narration
71	Playing Online	Pod August Night – 2006	Episode 19 (Live) – Differences: Doesn't have the adjective/acronyms mistake from Pod August Night
72	Rock Eisteddfod	Fegh Maha – 2004	Episode 30 (Live) – Scod goes into Chorus and stuffs Yon up plus other Scod base mistakes
73	Santa Fe	Middleborough Road – 2004	Episode 8 (Live)
74	Santa's Papers	For the Love of God! – 2008	Episode 1 (Live) – Differences: "to a processing center in Indonesia" instead of Nauru
75	Science Facts are Useful	About an Hour of Song in an Hour – 2002	
76	Second Drawer Down	Open Slather – 2000	Episode 59 (Live) – A number of false starts as Yon decides if he likes what is being sung. Unrehearsed so a number of mistakes.
77	Shut Down	This Gaming Life – 2015	Episode 46 (Live)
78	Skyrim	This Gaming Life – 2015	
79	Snapshots	Middleborough Road – 2004	Episode 48 (Live)
80	Someday the Lord	Fegh Maha – 2004	Episode 3 (Live) – Differences: "Stand next to Bruce Boxleitner" instead of "Tron", (Say graceful then correct to gracious)
80	Someday the Lord	Fegh Maha – 2004	Episode 17 (Live)
81	Squares on a Screen	This Gaming Life – 2015	Episode 29 (Live)
82	This Stuffing	For the Love of God! – 2008	Episode 26 (Recording)
83	Stuntman	Middleborough Road – 2004	Episode 37 (Live)
84	Suicide Bomber	Songs from Self Saucing – 2006	Episode 26 (Live) – Scod stuffs up second chorus and starts over
85	Taking the Life	Tripod Versus the Dragon – 2010	Episode 67 (Live) – featuring Andrew Pogson on Blaxophone
86	Tall Man	Songs from Self Saucing – 2006	Episode 37 (Live)
87	That's Why I'm Sending You	Middleborough Road – 2004	Episode 20 (Live)
87	That's Why I'm Sending You	Middleborough Road – 2004	Episode 40 (Live) – Upgrade lyrics from predictive text to auto-correct with mistakes
88	Theme from M*A*S*H Guy	Songs from Self Saucing – 2006	Episode 6 (Live) – Differences: No Yon cleaning his gun with his tongue gag at end
89	This is My Last Transmission	Lady Robots – 2002	Episode17 (Live)
90	Three Seconds of Halo	This Gaming Life – 2015	Episode 13 (Recording) – Demo version with synth orchestra
91	Thursday	Men of Substance – 2013	Episode 22 (Live)
92	The Trees	Fegh Maha – 2004	Episode 1 (Recording)
93	Triangle of Happiness	Men of Substance – 2013	Episode 32 (live) – Differences: Loud Casio beat during song, Solo is Scod doing Casio drum solo
94	Trying to Impress the Bargirl	Middleborough Road – 2004	Episode 22 (Live)
95	Ugly Men	Fegh Maha – 2004	Episode 21 (Live)
96	Underground	Assassin's Creed Syndicate – 2015	Episode 13 (Recording) – Album version
96	Underground	Assassin's Creed Syndicate – 2015	Episode 13 (Recording) – Demo version Austin Wintory instrumental
97	Visor King	Perfectly Good Songs – 2007	Episode 35 (Live)
98	Waiting for the Game to Load	Men of Substance – 2013	Episode 29 (Live)
99	The Wheel	Live at Woodford – 2008	Episode 19 (Live) – Differences: What have we learn rant about link clicking
100	With All of My Riches	Men of Substance – 2013	Episode 28 (Live) – Differences: Poggo talks over the ending and outro's the episode
101	Would You Mind	1998	

Non 101 Hits Perfectly Good Podcast Song Appearances
Song	From	Episode Song Appearances
The Star Wars demo	first submitted to Poggo for consideration for a new live show	Episode 2 (Recording)
The Rig	This Gaming Life – 2015	Episode 5 (Live)
The Rig	This Gaming Life – 2015	Episode 40 (Live)
Theme from How To Train An Attack Dog From Scratch	How to Train an Attack Dog from Scratch – 2007	Episode 6 (Live) – Differences: Scod sings incorrect line in first verse, and corrects himself.
Dirty Power	Perfectly Good Songs – 2007	Episode 9 (Recording) – Album version
Homophobic Christmas Tree	For the Love of God! – 2008	Episode 9 (Recording) – Album version
Shiny Chin	Perfectly Good Songs – 2007	Episode 9 (Recording) – Album version
Maryanne	Fegh Maha – 2004	Episode 10 (Live)
Autistic	Songs from Self Saucing – 2006	Episode 11 (Recording) – Album version
Nothing To See Here	For the Love of God! – 2008	Episode 12 (Recording) – Album version
Broken Heart	Double J's Writer's Room	Episode 12 (Recording)
Gelatinous Love	Tripod Versus the Dragon – 2010	Episode 14 (Live)
Surfers Paradise The Musical	About an Hour of Song-In-An-Hour...Again – 2003	Episode 16 (Recording) – Album version
Kevin Bacon	About an Hour of Song-In-An-Hour...Again – 2003	Episode 16 (Recording) – Album version
We'll Make It Work	Lady Robots – 2002	Episode 18 (Live)
Boobs	Middleborough Road – 2004	Episode 23 (Live) – featuring Andrew Pogson, Yon stuffs up last verse
Blow This Town	Tripod Versus the Dragon – 2010	Episode 23 (Live)
If Billy Bragg	For the Love of God! – 2008	Episode 25 (Live) – Differences: No trumpet so Yon whistles and also Poggo's phone goes off near the end and everyone cracks up a bit
The Little Drummer Boy	For the Love of God! – 2008	Episode 25 (Live)
O Holy Night	For the Love of God! – 2008	Episode 25 (Live) – Differences: Yon interrupts himself and talks on his verse, this leads to a few stop/starts and tomfoolery
Carolina Street Stomp	How to Train an Attack Dog from Scratch – 2007	Episode 39 (Live)
Hey You're Good at Shakespeare	Song in an Hour Live on Podcast	Episode 43 (Live)
The Play is Shit	Written for a special in honor of Ray Lawler	Episode 44 (Live)
Tonight Will Be Fine	Cover of Leonard Cohen song	Episode 45 (Live)
In The Still of the Night	Cover of Fred Parris and The Satins song	Episode 47 (Live)
Heartache Tonight	Cover of Eagles song	Episode 49B (Live) – No Yon, featuring Andrew Pogson doing Blaxophone
For Those We Love	From Paul McDermott and Gatesy Go Solo	Episode 51 (Live) – featuring Paul McDermott and Andrew Pogson on Blaxophone
Throw Your Arms Around Me	Cover of Hunters & Collectors song	Episode 51 (Live) – featuring Paul McDermott and Andrew Pogson on Blaxophone
Drive	Written for Book launch of the book "Get Up Mum" by Justin Heazlewood	Episode 52 (Live)
More Than This	Cover of Roxy Music song	Episode 54 (Live) – featuring Andrew Pogson on Blaxophone
Oasnis Yeah	not recorded	Episode 56 (Live)
Molly Meldrum Interview (Countdown)	From Spicks And Specks Reunion Special	Episode 57 (Live)
I Just Called To Say I Love You	Cover of Stevie Wonder Song	Episode 57 (Live) – featuring Andrew Pogson on vocals
Snake Eater	From Metal Gear Solid 3	Episode 58 (Live)
Compass	From Red Dead Redemption 1	Episode 58 (Live)
Oh Jedi Knight	Holy Night Parody	Episode 60 (Live)
Must Be Santa	Cover	Episode 60 (Live) – featuring Andrew Pogson as the Audience
White Christmas	Instrumental	Episode 60 (Live) – featuring Yon on trumpet and Andrew Pogson on Blaxophone
The Shit on Our Head	From The Writers Room – Double J	Episode 61 (Live)
Love is a Lie	From The Writers Room – Double J	Episode 62 (Live)
Not All of Queen Were Gay	not recorded	Episode 63 (Live)
I Have To Teach You A Broken Heart	From The Writers Room – Double J	Episode 64 (Live)
I Want To Break Free	Queen Cover	Episode 65 (Live) – featuring Andrew Pogson on Blaxophone
Autumn Leaves	Nat King Cole Cover	Episode 66 (Live) – featuring Yon on trumpet and Andrew Pogson on Blaxophone
You Got To Have Nuts	From a play with a greater cast (not named)	Episode 66 (Live)
Everything is Permanently Good Again	From a play with a greater cast (not named)	Episode 68 (Live)
Birthday	Pod August Night – 2006	Episode 69 (Live)
Take There spirit	The Dragon	Episode 70 (Live)
Holy Night	For the Love of God! – 2008	Episode 71 (Live) – featuring Andrew Pogson on Blaxophone
Wish You a White Male Christmas	not recorded	Episode 71 (Live) – featuring Andrew Pogson on Blaxophone

Suggested in Episode 27, and making its first appearance in Episode 28 with Andrew Pogson's submission Tripod asked listeners to submit alternate lyrics for the song Aquaman, and Tripod then played each submission on varies episodes.

Aquaman Listeners submitted Covers
Song	Submitted by	Episode Song Appearances
Poggin Hood	Andrew Pogson	Episode 28
Maryanne	Tapenwa Mozongo	Episode 31 – Unrehearsed, so some mistakes, no second verse
Traitor Jim	Barantis	Episode 32 – Unrehearsed and some lyrics are cut off so some mistakes
The Tally Hoes	Marus	Episode 33 – featuring Andrew Pogson, Yon and Poggo talk game talk during acoustic guitar solo
Baby Girl	Omre	Episode 35
Social Norm	Jeremy Huges	Episode 36 – featuring Andrew Pogson doing vocal guitar solo
Here I Am	Jennifer Whitehouse	Episode 38
Lingering Dad	Nick Chero	Episode 39 – Solo done by trumpet
Aquamann	Unknown author but suggested it was Casey Bennetto	Episode 41 – Poggo talks over solo
My Best Friend	Tim Alan	Episode 44 – featuring Andrew Pogson doing Blaxophone solo instead of normal guitar solo
Aquaman The Tribute	Sergeant Bandit from The Tally Hoes	Episode 45 – featuring Andrew Pogson doing Blaxophone solo instead of normal guitar solo

=== Game Music ===
In 2023, Stray Gods: The Roleplaying Musical was released, featuring songs co-written by Tripod. The album is nominated for a Grammy Award for the 2024 ceremony.

== Recordings ==
Tripod's very first record Box Set was released in 1997. It was funded by their winnings from live TV segment Red Faces on Hey Hey It's Saturday

Their album Middleborough Rd, made up of studio recordings of songs they wrote for the sketch TV series SkitHouse, won the ARIA Award for Best Comedy Release at the ARIA Music Awards of 2005.

Tripod toured with the show Tripod are Self Saucing in 2004, and again at the 2006 MICF. They recorded a live album of the show in April 2006 entitled Songs from Self Saucing, recorded and mixed by regular collaborator Nao Anzai, which was nominated for Best Comedy Release at the 2007 ARIA awards.

Tripod's first DVD was also released in 2006: a live recording of their 2005 show "POD August Nights". The DVD includes numerous special features including a music video for their song "Gonna Make You Happy Tonight" from their 2004 album, Middleborough Rd.

Tripod's 2001 show, Tripod tells the tale of the Adventures of Tosswinkle the Pirate (Not Very Well) was also released on DVD in 2006, following the original 2001 VHS release.

In 2009, Tripod released a DVD of a live performance at the Woodford Folk Festival. This DVD featured never-before-seen bonus footage consisting of a bootleg recording of their 2007 show How to Train an Attack Dog from Scratch, a show whose narrative was loosely based around an examination of the fictional history of musical comedy.

Tripod released a Christmas album in 2009, from their Christmas shows, entitled For the Love of God. A toured nationally with the songs, performing in the Sydney Opera House that year.

They released a CD of songs from Tripod versus the Dragon, including extended versions of the songs from an early version of the show, as well as a DVD with numerous easter eggs and special features on 2 March 2011.

Men of Substance, their first full scale studio project since For the Love of God, was produced by longtime friend and collaborator John Castle (Megan Washington, Vance Joy, the Bamboos)

== Composition ==
Tripod composed the theme song for SBS One's Australian television comedy history show ADbc in 2009.

=== Albums ===
List of albums, with selected details and chart positions
Title	Album details	Peak chart positions
Title	Album details	AUS
Box Set	Released: 1997; Label: Tripod (3POD001); Format: CD	—
Open Slather	Released: 2000; Label: Tripod (3POD002); Format: CD	—
About an Hour of Song-in-an-Hour	Released: October 2002; Label: ABC/ Universal Music (12852); Format: CD, download	65
About an Hour of Song-in-an-Hour ... Again	Released: 2003; Label: ABC/ Universal Music (13482); Format: CD, download	—
Tripod Live: Feghmaha	Released: May 2004; Label: Tripod (3POD003); Format: 2×CD, download	—
Middleborough Rd	Released: October 2004; Label: Liberation (LIBCD6137.2); Format: CD, download	88
Songs from Self Saucing	Released: 2006; Label: Tripod (3POD004); Format: CD, download	—
For the Love of God!: A Tripod Christmas Album	Released: 2008; Label: Tri Inc (LMCD – XXVII); Format: CD, download	—
Tripod Versus the Dragon (with Elana Stone)	Released: 2010; Label: Tripod Entertainment; Format: Download	—
Men of Substance	Released: 2012; Label: Tripod Entertainment (3POD006); Format: Download, CD	—
Perfectly Good Songs	Released: 2007; Label: Tripod; Format: Download	—
Perfect Tripod: Australian Songs	Released: 2013; Label: Tripod; Format: Download	—
Assassin's Creed: Syndicate (with Austin Wintory)	Released: 2015; Label: Tripod; Format: Download	—

== Members ==
- Scott "Scod" Edgar – vocals, guitar, keyboard (1996–present)
- Steven "Gatesy" Gates – vocals, guitar (1996–present)
- Simon "Yon" Hall – vocals, trumpet, kazoo, occasional percussion (1996–present)

== Awards ==
=== ARIA Music Awards ===
The ARIA Music Awards is an annual awards ceremony that recognises excellence, innovation, and achievement across all genres of Australian music. Tripod has won one award from six nominations, all in the category of ARIA Award for Best Comedy Release.

Year	Nominee / work	Award	Result
2003	About an Hour of Song in an Hour	Best Comedy Release	Nominated
2004	About an Hour of Song in an Hour...Again	Best Comedy Release	Nominated
2004	Live – Fegh Maha	Best Comedy Release	Nominated
2005	Middleborough Rd	Best Comedy Release	Won
2007	Songs from Self Saucing	Best Comedy Release	Nominated
2009	For the Love of God!	Best Comedy Release	Nominated

=== Grammy Awards ===
In November 2023, Tripod received a Grammy Award nomination for Stray Gods: The Roleplaying Musical, with collaborators Austin Wintory and Montaigne. The ceremony took place in February 2024.

=== Other Awards ===
- 2003 Australian Comedy Awards: People's Choice Award; Award for Outstanding Comedy Recording (Songs in an Hour)
- 2007 Edinburgh Spirit of the Fringe award.
- 2008 Green Room Award: Best Original Songs in a Cabaret Performance (How to Train an Attack Dog from Scratch).
- 2015 ASTRA Award: Most Outstanding Children's Program (Monster Beach)
