= Kind of Pluto =

Australian band formed in 2002 by Steven Gates

- Origin: Melbourne, Victoria, Australia
- Genres: Pop, rock
- Years active: 1999–2004 (hiatus)
- Label: Independent
- Members: Steven Gates; Simm Thom; Ben Rynderman; Tommy Kende

Kind of Pluto were an Australian band formed in 1999 by Melbourne singer-songwriter Steven Gates and drummer Simm Thom. Later, they added keyboardist Ben Ryderman and bassist Tommy Kende.

Gates, who also performs with the comedy group Tripod, has been writing and performing his own original music since the age of sixteen. Before Kind of Pluto, Gates refined his songwriting skills by performing solo acoustic spots all over Australia. In 1999, he took his songs as far as New York City and Philadelphia. Gates decided to create an acoustic duo with friend and drummer Simm Thom.

Kind of Pluto's first EP was launched on 19 October 2001 at Melbourne's 9th Ward.

Kind of Pluto received nationwide airplay with their first release, a self-titled EP described by Time Off Magazine as "brilliantly warm, fresh and ethereal. Absolutely shines with inspiration." The EP's first track, Familiar, was given strong rotation on the Triple J network. A 'Live at the Wireless' session for Richard Kingsmill's Oz Music Show brought them much attention from listeners and record companies alike. "Everyone's A Pornstar" was played on the Triple J network as well. The band was also chosen by Nova 100 as Melbourne Band of the Week and enjoyed extensive radio play with Sleepwalker. Other radio stations to support Kind of Pluto include Triple R and PBS.

Since early 2005, the band has been on an extended hiatus – perhaps never to return – with Ben Rynderman departing the group at the end of 2004.

== Former members ==
- Christine Carley (bass)
- Brett Canning (bass)
- Ben Rynderman (keyboard)

== Discography ==
- Kind of Pluto EP
