= Are You Smarter than a 5th Grader? (Australian game show) =

Australian game show

- Genre: Game show
- Developed by: Roving Enterprises
- Presented by: Rove McManus
- Country of origin: Australia
- Original language: English
- No. of seasons: 3
- No. of episodes: 12

Production
- Executive producers: Craig Campbell; Rob Brearley
- Producer: Margaret Bashfield
- Production locations: Global Television Studios (2007); Docklands Studios Melbourne, Victoria, Australia (2008–2009)
- Running time: 47 minutes (excluding advertisements)

Original release
- Network: Network Ten
- Release: 26 September 2007 – 30 October 2009

| Question | Value |
|---|---|
| 1 | $1,000 |
| 2 | $2,000 |
| 3 | $5,000 |
| 4 | $10,000 |
| 5 | $25,000 |
| 6 | $50,000 |
| 7 | $75,000 |
| 8 | $100,000 |
| 9 | $150,000 |
| 10 | $250,000 |
| 11 | $500,000 |

| Question | Value |
|---|---|
| 1 | $500 |
| 2 | $1,000 |
| 3 | $3,000 |
| 4 | $5,000 |
| 5 | $10,000 |
| 6 | $20,000 |
| 7 | $30,000 |
| 8 | $50,000 |
| 9 | $100,000 |
| 10 | $250,000 |
| 11 | $500,000 |

Are You Smarter than a 5th Grader? is an Australian quiz show produced by Roving Enterprises that debuted on Network Ten on 26 September 2007. It is hosted by popular TV personality Rove McManus. Filming for the show commenced on 11 September 2007 at Global Television Studios in Forest Hill.

McManus inspected the United States production (in its second series at the time) of the show while in the United States of America hosting his show Rove.

The children for the 2007 series were all students who were currently enrolled in Year 5 and were aged 10 or 11. They had to compete against many other Year 5 students to win the roles.

5th Grader games are played by a single contestant, who attempts to answer ten questions (plus a final bonus question). Content is taken from primary school textbooks, two from each grade level from first to fifth. Each correct answer increases the amount of money the player banks; a maximum cash prize of A$500,000 can be won. Along the way, the player can be assisted by a "classmate", one of five cast members (who are fifth grade students), in answering the questions. Notably, upon getting an answer incorrect or deciding to end the game, the contestant must profess to the camera "My name is [contestants name] and I am not smarter than a fifth grader.".

A second season of the show commenced in late 2008. Five new students feature due to the five original students being no longer able to feature because they had advanced to grade six. An additional change will be the addition of celebrity contestants playing for charity alongside regular contestants.

On 10 November 2008, it was announced that a third season of Are You Smarter than a 5th Grader? would be produced and aired in 2009. The first episode screened on Monday 27 July 2009. 2009 would be the last season of the Australian format.

== Format ==
=== Current board ===
| 1st Subject | 2nd Subject |
|---|---|
| $500,000 Question | $500,000 Subject |
| 5th Grade World History | 5th Grade Maths |
| 4th Grade Physical Science | 5th Grade Vocab |
| 4th Grade Social Studies | 4th Grade Art |
| 3rd Grade Music | 3rd Grade Spelling |
| 1st Grade Literature | 2nd Grade Foreign Languages |

=== Former board ===
| 1st Subject | 2nd Subject |
|---|---|
| Half Million Dollar Question | Half Million Dollar Subject |
| 5th Grade Math | 5th Grade Australian History |
| 4th Grade World Geography | 4th Grade Earth Science |
| 3rd Grade Cultural Studies | 3rd Grade Astronomy |
| 2nd Grade Grammar | 2nd Grade Physical Education |
| 1st Grade Measurements | 1st Grade Health |

=== Rules ===
In each game, the contestant is asked a series of eleven questions taken from textbooks from first through fifth grade curricula. Each contestant is given ten subjects to choose from (such as spelling, maths or social studies), each of which is associated with a grade level; there are two questions per grade, from first to fifth. In 2008, this changed to a 1st and 2nd grade question, two 3rd grade questions and three 4th and 5th grade questions. Contestants can answer the questions in any order, and each correct answer raises their cumulative amount of winnings to the next level (see table at right); after a contestant answers the fifth/seventh question correctly, they are guaranteed to leave the game with at least $25,000/$30,000. If a contestant correctly answers the first ten questions, they are given the opportunity to answer a fifth-grade bonus question worth $500,000.

Five fifth grade students appear on each show and play along on stage – each episode in a season has the same cast of children. The contestant chooses one to be their "classmate", who stands at the adjacent podium and is often consulted by the contestant before a topic is chosen; the other four sit at desks off to the side. Each child may only be the contestant's classmate for two questions (answered consecutively), after which the contestant picks another child from those who are yet to play.

Contestants have three forms of assistance (two cheats and a save) each available for use once per game (up to, but not including, the final question):

- Peek: The contestant can see what his/her classmates wrote down as the answer and choose whether to use it or not as their own response. If the contestant chooses to use this cheat, they can choose to go with their classmate's answer or use their own
- Copy: The contestant is locked into whichever answer his/her classmates wrote down without being able to see it beforehand.
- Save: If the contestant answers a question incorrectly but their classmate is correct, they are credited with a correct answer. However, if the classmate is also wrong, the contestant loses. This is used automatically on the contestant's first incorrect response.

The contestant is not allowed to communicate with his/her classmates before making their decision (e.g. to ask them if they are confident with their answer). Once all three forms of assistance are used, the contestant can no longer choose a classmate and are left to answer subsequent questions on their own.

If a contestant answers a question incorrectly (and is not saved), they are disqualified and lose all of their winnings (or drop to $25,000/$30,000 if they had surpassed the fifth/seventh question). Contestants may choose to drop out at any point during the game prior to the $500,000 question (even after viewing the question), which entitles them to leave the game with any winnings they have accumulated.

The rules change slightly for the final question. Contestants are only permitted to read the subject of the question before deciding whether or not they will continue or forfeit from the game. However, if the contestant chooses to pursue the question, they are no longer eligible to drop out and must answer the question, with no assistance from their classmates. A wrong answer on the question will cause the contestant to drop back down to $25,000/$30,000.

If a contestant loses, or voluntarily forfeits, they must face the camera, state their name and declare "I am not smarter than a 5th grader." However, if the $500,000 question is answered correctly, the contestant has the opportunity to claim, "I am smarter than a fifth grader."

The highest amount which has been won on the show was during the finale of the first season, when Shelly McClean won A$250,000. She decided to "drop out" after seeing the topic (Myths and Legends) of the $500,000 question. She proudly proclaimed that she is not smarter than a fifth grader, but richer. This was equaled by Sarah Carlin-Smith on the first episode of the second season, Chris Dwyer in the second episode of the third season and Dr. Chris Brown in the final episode of the third season.

The fifth-grade students who appear on the show as the contestant's classmates each pocket A$10,000, which is held in a trust fund until they turn 18.

None of the adults who have appeared on the show have managed to win the $500,000. However four contestants were able to make it to the question but then chose to drop out leaving with $250,000, except Dr. Chris Brown, whose money went to Assistance Dogs Australia. Chris Brown was the only contestant who was shown the actual question after taking the $250,000. The question was "Which island is Mawson Peak located?". Brown didn't know the answer and was glad to have taken the money. The correct answer was Heard Island.

== Season synopses ==
=== Season 1 ===
- Sam
- Darcy
- Moya
- Max
- Callum
- Sarah

=== Season 2 ===
- Sean
- Isobel
- Jesse
- Sara
- Summer
- Daniel

=== Season 3 ===
- Maddie
- Dylan
- Liam
- Oliver (Olly)
- Lily

Season 3 was the last season.
