= Saturday Night Rove =

- The logo of Saturday Night Rove.
- Genre: Variety; Comedy; Entertainment
- Created by: Rove McManus
- Written by: Evan Williams; Alex Jae; Alex Lee; Justin Hamilton
- Presented by: Rove McManus
- Starring: Alex Jae; Alex Lee; Justin Hamilton
- Voices of: Judith Lucy
- Country of origin: Australia
- Original language: English
- No. of series: 1
- No. of episodes: 2

Production
- Executive producer: Jo Long
- Producer: Rove McManus
- Camera setup: Multi-camera
- Running time: 50—52 minutes
- Production companies: Roving Enterprises; Haven't You Done Well Productions — Aunty Donna skits

Original release
- Network: Network 10
- Release: 25 August 2018 – 31 August 2019

Saturday Night Rove, also referred to as Saturday Night, is an Australian television variety show hosted by comedian Rove McManus. The program premiered on Network 10 on 24 August 2019 and aired on Saturdays at 7:30 pm. It featured a mixture of live and pre-recorded entertainment, including skits, live crosses, guest interviews, pranks, challenges and comedy acts & routines.

The show was produced by Rove McManus' Roving Enterprises and first appeared as a pilot episode screened on 24 August 2018. A season for 2019, with 6 episodes, was commissioned by Network Ten in October 2018 and premiered on 24 August 2019, however after only 2 episodes being aired, the show was axed due to disappointing ratings. Aunty Donna who had created skits for the show that were not aired due to the cancellation would later release these on their YouTube channel in April 2020.

== Cast ==
- Rove McManus
- Alex Lee
- Alex Jae
- Justin Hamilton
- Voice of Judith Lucy
- Aunty Donna

== Episodes ==
No.	Title	Guest(s)	Original release date	Viewers
1	Episode 1	Jessica Mauboy, Ivan Aristeguieta with Anthony Callea, Luke McGregor	24 August 2019	244,000
2	Episode 2	Becky Lucas & Cam James, Danielle Walker with Kevin Rudd	31 August 2019	138,000

== Ratings ==
Series	Episodes	Premiere			Finale			Source
Series	Episodes	Premiere date	Premiere viewers	Rank	Finale date	Finale viewers	Rank	Source
1	2	24 August 2019	244,000	14	31 August 2019	138,000		

== See also ==
- List of Australian television series
- Rove Live
- Hey Hey It's Saturday
- Saturday Night Live
- Chris & Julia's Sunday Night Takeaway
- Ant & Dec's Saturday Night Takeaway
- The Project
- Aunty Donna
