= Fam Time =

Australian sitcom

- Genre: Sitcom; Comedy
- Created by: Michael Horrocks
- Written by: Erica Harrison; Jack Yabsley
- Directed by: Hayden Guppy
- Starring: Michala Banas
- Country of origin: Australia
- Original language: English
- No. of series: 1
- No. of episodes: 6

Production
- Executive producer: Michael Horrocks
- Producers: Linda Ujuk; Muffy Potter
- Camera setup: Multi-camera
- Running time: 30 minutes
- Production company: Seven Studios

Original release
- Network: 7plus
- Release: 11 July 2024

Fam Time is an Australian television comedy series produced by the Seven Network. The series is created by Michael Horrocks and directed by Hayden Guppy.

Fam Time follows the story of the highly dysfunctional blended Box family which, like most families today, is struggling to combine their online and everyday lives in the suburbs.

The series was filmed in 2019, and was originally set to air in 2020. However Seven announced in October 2020 the series would air instead in 2021 but this never occurred. Ultimately, all six episodes were released on 7plus on 11 July 2024.

== Cast ==
- Michala Banas as Belinda Box
- Benson Jack Anthony as Rylan Box
- Duncan Fellows as John Box (aka "Handy Andy")
- Rhonda Burchmore as Grandma Viv (aka "Foxy Box")
- Karina Banno as Tahnee Box
- Chloe De Los Santos as Cherry Box
- Tainui Tukiwaho as Bill Whata
- Kristy Best as Donna Jayatissa
- Mathilde Anglade as Claudette

== Episodes ==
No.	Title	Directed by	Written by	Original release date
1	"Episode 1"	Hayden Guppy	Jack Yabsley	11 July 2024
2	"Episode 2"	Hayden Guppy	Erica Harrison	11 July 2024
3	"Episode 3"	Hayden Guppy	Erica Harrison	11 July 2024
4	"Episode 4"	Hayden Guppy	Jack Yabsley	11 July 2024
5	"Episode 5"	Hayden Guppy	Erica Harrison	11 July 2024
6	"Episode 6"	Hayden Guppy	Jack Yabsley	11 July 2024

== Reception ==
David Knox from TV Tonight rated the series 2 out of 5 stars stating the series has underwhelming gags and dated humour however doesn't believe it's one of the worst comedies. Anthony Morris from Screen Hub Australia rated the series 2½ out of 5 stars stating the series is a huge cliche and relies too much on sex jokes.

== See also ==
- List of Australian television series
