= Songs from Self Saucing =

Live album by Tripod
- Released: 2 December 2006
- Recorded: April 2006
- Venues: Hi-Fi Bar and Ballroom, Melbourne
- Genre: Comedy rock
- Length: 36:39
- Label: Tripod Entertainment
- Producer: Nao Anzai

Tripod chronology
| Perfectly Good Songs (2006) | Songs from Self Saucing (2006) | For the Love of God!: A Tripod Christmas Album (2008) |

Songs from Self Saucing is the seventh album from Australian comedy trio, Tripod, and their third live album. It was recorded in April 2006, during the last "Tripod Are: Self Saucing" show at the Melbourne International Comedy Festival, in front of a sell out crowd at the Hi-Fi Bar and Ballroom.

Owen Richardson from The Age caught their gig on 24 April 2006, he found, "[it] is just songs and jokes and hasn't the sublime, daggy silliness of their sci-fi musical Lady Robots, but it's all good stuff... [they] want us to know they care and are aware, but don't want to be seen to take themselves too seriously."

Most songs from the final performance in the "Tripod Are: Self Saucing" series are included on the album. It was nominated for Best Comedy Release at the ARIA Music Awards of 2007 but lost to Dave Hughes' DVD 'Live'.

== Track listing ==
1. "Autistic" – 4:33
2. "King Kong" – 5:02
3. "Tall Man" – 3:36
4. "Too Many Remotes" – 4:24
5. "Lingering Dad" – 2:20
6. "Theme from MASH Guy" – 3:45
7. "No Daughter of Mine" – 1:39
8. "Forgive me Father" – 3:08
9. "Suicide Bomber" – 3:06
10. "Gonna Make You Happy Tonight" – 5:01

"Gonna Make You Happy Tonight" appeared on Middleborough Rd (October 2004) and Pod August Night (March 2006), and "Lingering Dad" is also on Pod August Night.
