= Lie Detectors =

2015 American TV series

- Genre: Game show
- Created by: Tim Fornara
- Presented by: Rove McManus
- Country of origin: United States
- Original language: English
- No. of seasons: 1
- No. of episodes: 18 (22 unaired)

Production
- Executive producers: Jim Biederman; Marla Ratner; Tim Fornara
- Production company: Jim Co.

Original release
- Network: Game Show Network
- Release: April 20 – May 27, 2015

Lie Detectors is an American television series broadcast by Game Show Network. The series, hosted by Rove McManus, premiered on April 20, 2015.

Each episode features a panel of three comedians presenting a variety of random facts and lies over several rounds to a studio audience, who vote to decide which of the three comedians tells the truth in each round.

== Production ==
The series received little advanced attention from GSN before it was announced as green-lit on March 10, 2015. During the first week of the series' run, a new episode aired each weekday (Monday to Friday) at 6:30 p.m. ET. Starting on April 29 of the same year, the show moved to its permanent time slot, with two back-to-back new episodes airing each Wednesday at 9:00 p.m. ET. The series was not renewed for a second season.

=== Cast ===
Panelists on the show have included:

- Christian Finnegan
- Michelle Buteau
- Sherrod Small
- Liza Treyger
- Dave Hill
- Gina Brillon
- Nick Turner
- Rachel Feinstein
- Casey Jost
- Sean Donnelly
- Sabrina Jalees
- Jennifer Bartels
- Lil Rel Howery
- Arden Myrin
- Brandon Scott Jones
- Jade Catta-Preta

== Reception ==
Both David Knox and Neil Genzlinger, writing for Australia's TV Tonight and The New York Times respectively, drew comparisons between the series and To Tell the Truth.

=== Ratings ===
The first episode in its regular timeslot on April 29, 2015 rated 342,000 American viewers, losing 191,000 viewers from lead-in Idiotest. On May 6, 2015, it dropped to 298,000 viewers.
