= Real Stories =

- Created by: Hamish Blake; Andy Lee
- Presented by: Jennifer Adams
- Starring: Hamish Blake; Andy Lee; Ryan Shelton; Tim Bartley
- Narrated by: Greg Fleet
- Country of origin: Australia
- Original language: English
- No. of series: 1
- No. of episodes: 8

Production
- Producers: Roving Enterprises; Radio Karate
- Production location: Australia
- Running time: approx 30 min. per episode (inc. commercials)

Original release
- Network: Network Ten
- Release: 22 August – 10 October 2006

Real Stories is an Australian satirical television comedy series produced by Carlton Television for Network Ten. It was created by Hamish Blake and Andy Lee. The series was first broadcast on 22 August 2006.

Eight episodes were produced. The program was a parody of current affairs shows. It was hosted by Jennifer Adams, a former Seven Network reporter. The show mimicked a standard current affairs format. Pre-recorded segments in the show were introduced by the host. These segments starred Hamish Blake, Andy Lee, Ryan Shelton, and Tim Bartley with voice-overs provided by Greg Fleet.

The show originally started as a project for Melbourne's Channel 31, a community access television station, as a collaboration between Roving Enterprises and Hamish & Andy's production company, Radio Karate. It was repeated during 2007, and is currently available on DVD. Several podcasts were produced, including material not broadcast in the series.

== Episodes ==
No.	Title	Original release date
1	"Episode 1"	22 August 2006
Paperboy Recruiter: A behind-the-scenes look with Australia's most passionate paper boy scout. Street Accountants: A look at the sordid world of street accountants. These illegal and unregistered accountants menace the streets and night soliciting for work Odd Medical Conditions: celebrating a hero who cares for those with odd and unfortunate medical conditions. These people have been forgotten and shunned by the cruel world we live in. 70 Years of Jumping: looking back on the 70 years since the invention of jumping, also catching up with Australia's ‘Mr. Jumping’, the man responsible for popularising this innovation in Australia. Guest star: Peter Helliar.
2	"Episode 2"	29 August 2006
Hopkin Brother Fun-nerals: A look at the Hopkins Brothers, who hope to make funerals fun by using such gags as speech bubbles and hand buzzers on the deceased. Modern Day Noah: Wayne Foster thinks he received a message from God in his spaghetti, and is trying to collect two of every animal on earth and build an ark. Grounded for Life: The 27-year-old man who has been grounded for 15 years because his Dad fell into a coma the day after grounding him. Policey's Week: When young police cadets graduate from the academy, they hit the Gold Coast for a week of drinking and fun. Guest stars: Alison Whyte, Anita Smith, Camille Border and Esme Melville.
3	"Episode 3"	5 September 2006
The Jesse Martin Cover-up: In another Real Stories exclusive. They reveal for the first time that the famous, round the world solo yachtsman was not really alone. H2Flow: In New Zealand, a small country off the east coast of Australia, a water wasting campaign is underway as a matter of crucial national importance. Tribute to a Re-enactor: Australia's greatest ever crime re-enactor for a crime watch style show has just died. We pay tribute to this fine craftsman and remember his work. Princess Mary Hate Club: Two people who run Australia's smallest and most unpopular club. Guest stars: Jesse Martin, Alan Brough, Samantha Tolj, Jeremy Kewley, Glenda Linscott, Sandra Lackas, Stephen Hannah, Xavier Ryan, Glenys Tatti, Joshua Allen, Ben Anderson, Cameron Lee, Rebecca Malavindi, Mark Nussbaum and Jess Harris.
4	"Episode 4"	12 September 2006
Celebrity Sex Tape Director: We reveal that so called celebrity sex tapes are actually slick productions and big business. We meet the Aussie director who has worked with some big names. Man Dog: We were there to witness the troubled transition of a dog who has become a man via a new surgical technique. A deeply moving story of love. World Board Games Championships: The highs and lows of the World Board Games Championships as a Commonwealth Games official looks for a new event. Window Washer Scam: The guys who wash windows at traffic lights make a lot more money than you think. Our surprising investigation into this shadowy world of tax-free grey areas. Guest stars: Cassandra Magrath, Blair McDonough, Steve Oemcke and Christine Keogh.
5	"Episode 5"	19 September 2006
Church Reviewer: What exactly makes a great reviewer of church services and rabbis? An age-old question. We meet Australia's most influential ecclesiastical critic. Broken Chain Email: In yet another exclusive, we see the extraordinary consequences of not passing on a chain email. A story that will both alarm and shock you and your family. Legalising Crime: Tasmania's new law to legalise theft has halved its crime rate, but there are problems. Big problems. Actually the problems are bigger than anyone could've predicted. 525,599 Minutes Silence: The small yet patriotic Aussie town that observes a minute of silence for every digger who died. This leaves only one minute a year to chat. We were there for that one minute. Guest stars: Rove McManus, Derryn Hinch, Juan Modinger, Hrisanthi Tomaszewski and Fiona Todd.
6	"Episode 6"	26 September 2006
Hey Dad..! The Movie: We follow the process of turning Australia's longest running sitcom in to a feature film. Shakespeare's New Musical: The story of a director and actors that perform a newly discovered a Shakespeare Musical called "The King Hath Farted". Institute of Sayings: After the government cut funds for the Australian Institute of Sayings, we are given an insight into their day-to-day work, and how important they are in our society. Guest stars: Stephen Curry, Nicholas Bell, Serena Cottle and Julie Forsyth.
7	"Episode 7"	3 October 2006
Backyard Disaster: A couple of battlers struggle with a TV network after a botched, 24-hour backyard renovation. A story that is both inspiring and a lesson to us all. The Skill Tester Epidemic: It's the youth—and they're at risk again. Addiction to skill testers is the number one new risk facing Australia's at risk youth. Fat Binge for Comedy: A brave comedian's moving battle to put back on the pounds after an illness ruins the only routine he has. Bird Call Centre: Aussie call centre jobs at risk again. This time it's not foreigners, but birds that are being trained to answer phones. When will the outrage end? Guest stars: Dave O'Neil, Tony Martin and Carrie Baker.
8	"Episode 8"	10 October 2006
Male Order Bride: Getting an Internet bride from Russia goes horribly wrong for an Aussie loser. And learns, it pays to read the fine print. Underground Choir: We go undercover with renegade kids who hold clandestine choir practices when it is banned from their school. Life Writers: A millionaire hires two comedy writers to make him funnier. This unique insight into the latest corporate craze is, of course, an exclusive. Guest stars: Catherine McClements, Francis Greenslade and Leonore Romensky.
