= Fegh Maha =

Live album by Tripod
- Released: 2004
- Genre: Comedy

Tripod chronology
About an Hour Of Song-in-an-Hour ... Again (2003)	Fegh Maha (2004)	Middleborough Rd (2004)

Fegh Maha or Live – Fegh Maha is the fifth album released by Australian comedy trio, Tripod, and their second live album. It spans two discs, with the first subtitled, Fegh and the second as, Maha. At the ARIA Music Awards of 2004 it was nominated for Best Comedy Release.

Studio-recorded full-band versions of four of the tracks, "Let's Take a Walk", "On Behalf of all the Geeks", "Trees" and "I Always Get Into Stuff" also feature on their CD, Middleborough Rd.

== Track listing ==
Disc 1: Fegh

1. "Hello"
2. "Rock Eisteddfod"
3. "Krap Karate"
4. "It's Okay"
5. "Ugly Men with Beautiful Women"
6. "The Hot Dog Man"
7. "Kempt"
8. "Keep Your Receipts"
9. "Fabian"
10. "The Lonesome/Gregarious Cowboy"

Disc 2: Maha

1. "Jamming - Originating from Skithouse"
2. "Let's Take A Walk - Continues from Jamming"
3. "Stuntman"
4. "Target"
5. "On Behalf of all the Geeks"
6. "Trees"
7. "Ghost Ship"
8. "Someday the Lord"
9. "I Always Get Into Stuff"
10. "My Best Friends Comin'"
11. "Maryanne"
12. "Outtakes from Urinetown" (secret track)
