= Middleborough Rd =

Studio album by Tripod
- Released: 11 October 2004
- Genre: Comedy
- Label: Australian comedy
- Producer: Cam McKenzie, Tripod

Tripod chronology
Fegh Maha (2004)	Middleborough Rd (2004)	Songs from Self Saucing (2006)

Middleborough Rd is the sixth album by Australian comedy trio, Tripod, which was released on 11 October 2004. The album peaked at number 88 on the ARIA Charts.

It consists of many songs previously heard on the Australian television show, Skithouse, on which Tripod feature.

At the ARIA Music Awards of 2005 it won Best Comedy Release, beating other releases which included 'SkitHOUSE LIVE', a compilation of sketches by various artists of material from the same show.

== Track listing ==
1. "Always Get into Stuff"
2. "Boobs"
3. "Trying To Impress The Bargirl"
4. "If I Had a Tattoo"
5. "Snapshots"
6. "Hot Girl in the Comic Shop"
7. "In The Countryside"
8. "Stuntman"
9. "On Behalf of All The Geeks"
10. "Fly So High"
11. "That's Why I'm Sending You..."
12. "Old Money"
13. "Gonna Make You Happy Tonight"
14. "Let's Take A Walk"
15. "Sante Fe"
16. "Trees"
17. "Astronaut"
18. "Strange French Outro" (secret track - not listed on album)

== Charts ==
Chart performance for Middleborough Rd
Chart (2004)	Peak position
Australian Albums (ARIA)	88
