= Dave Callan =

Australian comedian

- Born: 1974 or 1975 (age 50–51); Dundalk, County Louth, Ireland
- Occupations: Comedian; Radio announcer
- Years active: 1999−present

David Gerard Callan (born 1974 or 1975) is an Irish-born stand-up comedian, who has had a career in television and radio, and is based in Melbourne, Australia. Up until 2010 he worked as a Triple J disc jockey.

== Early life and education ==
David Gerard Callan was born in 1974 or 1975 in Dundalk, Ireland. He arrived in Australia with his family in 1990, aged 15.

He spent part of his teenage years in Perth, Western Australia, where he attended Chisholm Catholic College.

He attended university and as a student started doing gigs The Comedy Club in Perth.

== Career ==
=== Radio ===
Callan hosted the mid-dawn shift at Triple J on Sundays from 1 am to 6 am for most of 2005 until it was discontinued. He continued to host the Triple J show Pirate Radio from 6 pm until 9 pm on Saturday evenings. The show features party music, mash-ups, and many unusual regular callers referred to as 'carnies', including Steph from Tamworth, Evil Me, and Jarred from Bunbury. On 19 January 2008, Callan presented the last show of Pirate Radio. On 27 January 2008, he returned to the mid-dawn shift on Sundays from 1 am to 6 am. His last time on-air was the morning of Sunday, 19 December 2010.

=== TV ===
Callan first gained popularity while performing on Rove (Nine Network) and also on the first series of Rove Live (Network Ten), but left the show to pursue his love for stand up. Callan was Rove McManus' groomsman at his wedding to Belinda Emmett.

In 2005, Callan appeared in a series of commercials called "Change is in the Air", to introduce Australians to the impending smoking ban in pubs and clubs. He also narrated a commercial for the Ferndale Confectionery item "Tuff Nuts", and has performed in Western Australian advertisements for WA Home Loans and Fruitisma.

During 2006 and 2007 Callan appeared on jtv and presented episodes on occasion.

He has appeared as a guest on the Comedy Channel's improvisational comedy program Comedy Slapdown.

His other TV credits include O'Loghlin on Saturday Night (ABC), Standing Up (ABC), King of the Road (SBS), Good Morning Australia (Ten Network), The (NRL) Footy Show (Nine Network), Hey Hey It's Saturday (Nine Network), as a recurring guest on Spicks and Specks (ABC), and a regular performer on the yearly "Melbourne International Comedy Festival Gala". Callan has made several appearances on Good Game (ABC) as a guest reviewer, looking at Soul Calibur V, Just Dance: Best Of, Kid Icarus: Uprising and Heroes of Ruin, and currently has his own segment known as Laying Down the Lore.

He also made a cameo appearance playing Just Dance at the Game Masters convention.

=== Stand-up ===
Touring internationally over the next few years, Callan had shows each year in the Melbourne International Comedy Festival (MICF) including:

- Dave Callan is Shithouse (2000)
- Dave Callan is Hairy (2001)
- Jesus Christ, Movie Star (2001, with Duff)
- Dave Callan's Wonderful World (2003)
- Bare Faced Cheek (2004)
- Raw Comedy Finals (2004, as Host and MC)
- The Sunshine Factory (2005, with Sam Simmons, Tim Harris, Steve Bunce)
- Show us your Roots (2005, with Hung Le, Steve Abbott, Gabriel Rossi, Tommy Dean, Desh, Sean Choolburra, Tahir)
- The Sunshine Factory Part II (2006, with Sam Simmons)
- Dance of the Flame Retardant Monkey (2007)
- Daylight Savings for the Doomsday Clock (2008)
- 0+ (Symbol of Venus) (2011)
- The Graveyard Shift (2012, also called Radio Gaga)
- The Psychology of Laughter (2013)
- A Little Less Conversation (2014)
- A Little Less Conversation 2: A Little More Less Conversation (2015)

As of 2012, Callan was performing regularly at the MICF Festival Club and the MICF Festival Roadshow. His shows have included choreographed fight and dance scenes with Ninjas, Pirates, Zombies, and Burlesque Dancers. During MICFs he can often be seen with an entourage of ninjas.

His 2005 joint show with Sam Simmons, The Sunshine Factory was nominated for a Golden Gibbo MICF award.

Also in 2005, his show Show us your Roots (with a group of comedians – see list above) season sold out at Crown Casino as part of the MICF, at the National Multi-Cultural Festival in Canberra, and at the Sydney Opera House. This show was later released on DVD by Beyond Home Entertainment.

His later shows have included political and environmental commentary, for instance, 2007–2008 shows Dance of the Flame Retardant Monkey and Daylight Savings for the Doomsday Clock. Ripe with pop-culture references and an eclectic mash of immaturity and sincerity, Daylight Savings was a near sell-out season.

Callan's 2012 sell-out show The Graveyard Shift featured highlights from his late night radio program on TripleJ, with live commentary.

=== Film ===
He plays the character of a sports commentator in the 2012 Australian comedy film Reverse Runner.

Callan also received top billing in the upcoming satirical comedy/mystery feature film Wanda and Sully alongside Mieke Billing-Smith and Grant Young. However, he could not film his role due to the COVID-19 pandemic.
