= The Loft Live =

- Directed by: Arnold Norris
- Presented by: Rove McManus
- Country of origin: Australia
- Original language: English
- No. of seasons: 8

Production
- Executive producer: Marc Morel
- Producers: Amber Kane, Rove McManus, Tim Wood, Kim Hope
- Production locations: RMIT University; Melbourne, Australia
- Running time: Approx. 60 min. (Including Commercials)
- Production company: RMITV (Student Community Television Inc.)

Original release
- Network: C31 Melbourne
- Release: 1997 – 2000

The Loft Live was a weekly live variety hour television program produced by RMITV that broadcast on C31 Melbourne. The cast included Rove McManus (1997–1999), Scott Brennan, Peter Helliar, Adam Richard, Myf Warhurst, Ged Wood, Bert Kennedy, Kim Hope, Matilda Donaldson, Bernie Carr, and special reporters. Like its predecessor Under Melbourne Tonight, The Loft Live provided a platform for up-and-coming talent to get airtime; it gained a following between 50,000 and 100,000 viewers a week.

== Guests ==
Guests on the show included Larry Emdur, Livinia Nixon, John Brumby, Nadine Garner, Judith Lucy, Jeremy Sims, Neville Stonehouse, Dylan Lewis, Francis Leach, John Safran, Edwin Maher.

== Cast ==
Presenter	Role	Tenure
Rove McManus	Host	1997-1999
Ged Wood	Host	
Kim Hope	Host	
Peter Helliar	Supporting cast	
Scott Brennan	Supporting cast	
Adam Richard	Supporting cast	
Myf Warhurst	Supporting cast	
Bert Kennedy	Supporting cast	
Matilda Donaldson	Supporting cast	
Bernie Carr	Supporting cast	

== John Safran ==
In 2004, the first episode of John Safran vs God featured footage from The Loft Live. Episode 1 follows the plot that John Safran had appeared on The Loft Live with Rove McManus in 1997 after gaining popularity on the ABC TV show Race Around the World. After the taping of the episode of The Loft, Rove promised Safran that "If I ever can do anything for you ever, just ask". Five years later, in 2002, Safran's career had taken a beating after termination of his pilot commissioned by the ABC for an altercation he had with Ray Martin during the filming John Safran: Media Tycoon. By this stage, McManus was already at the top of Australian TV, routinely attracting more than a million viewers per episode on Rove Live. Wanting to gain publicity for his new SBS show John Safran's Music Jamboree, according to Safran, the SBS publicist had tentatively booked him in as a guest on Rove Live. However, before the taping of Rove Live, American singer P!nk replaced Safran as the guest. In 2004, in response to the perceived snub, Safran took a trip to the UK to jokingly get a fatwa put upon Rove by Omar Bakri Muhammad. The fatwa was later taken off when Omar Bakri was told by Safran that the pictures showing McManus mocking Islam were falsified. Safran later appeared on Rove in 2009 and thanked McManus for having him on despite the fatwa incident.
