= Hayden Guppy =

Australian television presenter

Hayden Guppy is an Australian television presenter He was a former co-host of Video Hits, alongside Fuzzy Agolley, until he left for reasons not cited in January 2010. He was part of the secondary cast on the variety show Rove until its initial incarnation disbanded in 2009. He was also a housemate of Australian comedian Hamish Blake, one half of comedy duo Hamish & Andy, who also appeared frequently on Rove.
