= Rove LA =

- Presented by: Rove McManus
- Country of origin: Australia
- Original language: English
- No. of seasons: 2
- No. of episodes: 23

Production
- Production locations: CBS Television City, Los Angeles, California (2011); Warner Bros. Studios, Burbank, California (2012)
- Running time: Approximately 60 minutes (including commercials)
- Production companies: Roving Enterprises; Avalon Television

Original release
- Network: Fox8
- Release: 19 September 2011 – 23 December 2012

Related
- Rove

Rove LA is an Australian television comedy talk show that debuted on Fox8 on 19 September 2011. The show is hosted by Rove McManus and is set in Los Angeles. The show is presented in a similar fashion to McManus's previous talk show Rove, featuring comedy segments and interviews with celebrity guests. The show was picked up for a two-year run on the Fox8 subscription channel.

== History ==
Rove LA began on the Fox8 cable network in September 2011 as a platform for McManus to return to Australian television. The concept of the show being Rove reporting each week in pre-recorded episodes from Los Angeles, which fit with McManus's current residency in the United States while still having a presence on Australian television. The series was picked up for a 10-episode run for 2011 on the network as a means to test the new show's reception with audiences.

The series was officially renewed for 2012 with the expectation of a longer season run. Rove LA was renewed for a second 13-episode season that premiered on 30 September 2012. The series was picked up by the TV Guide Network for broadcast in the United States.

== Format ==
Similar to McManus' former show Rove, the show starts with Rove performing a comedic monologue about a variety of topics and events, usually covering American culture. He then introduces his guests one by one on 'The Couch', engaging them in conversations led by various segments such as the "Getting to Know You" and "Random Question Hat". Unlike McManus' previous show, Rove is the only cast member of the show. In the last four episodes of season two, Gary Busey appeared as a "Stand-in Guest in case something goes wrong with one of the guests". The show is also notable for allowing its guests to swear on television.

== Episodes ==
=== Series overview ===
Series	Episodes	Originally released	
Series	Episodes	First released	Last released
1	10	19 September 2011	21 November 2011
2	13	30 September 2012	23 December 2012

=== Season 1 (2011) ===
No. overall	No. in season	Original release date	Cast
1	1	19 September 2011	Jerry Ferrara, Kathy Griffin and Lisa Kudrow; Guest appearance: Brenton Thwaites
2	2	26 September 2011	Paul F. Tompkins, Tim Gunn and Hugh Jackman; Guest appearance: Melissa Hoyer
3	3	3 October 2011	Anna Faris, Daniel Macpherson and Kevin Smith; Guest appearance: Zoe Ventoura
4	4	10 October 2011	Seth Green, Olivia Munn and Michael Weatherly; Guest appearance: Jonathon "The Impaler" Sharkey
5	5	17 October 2011	Steve Carell, Lake Bell and Eva Longoria
6	6	24 October 2011	Justin Timberlake, Eliza Dushku and James Marsden; Guest Appearance: George Gray
7	7	31 October 2011	LL Cool J, Michael C. Hall and k.d. lang
8	8	7 November 2011	Ty Burrell, John Krasinski and "Stone Cold" Steve Austin
9	9	14 November 2011	P!nk, Jim Parsons and Chris Hardwick
10	10	21 November 2011	Seth MacFarlane, will.i.am and Lauren Graham

=== Season 2 (2012) ===
No. overall	No. in season	Original release date	Cast
11	1	30 September 2012	Russell Brand, Adam Lambert and Kristen Schaal; Guest appearance: Tom Hanks
12	2	7 October 2012	Rainn Wilson, Sarah Wayne Callies and The Miz
13	3	14 October 2012	Eric Stonestreet, Casey Wilson and Benji and Joel Madden; Guest appearance: Luke "Mini Mac" McManus
14	4	21 October 2012	Aisha Tyler, Matthew Fox and Emmy Rossum
15	5	28 October 2012	Joel McHale, Wendi McLendon-Covey and Wayne Brady
16	6	4 November 2012	Ben Folds, James Van Der Beek and Jeff Probst
17	7	11 November 2012	Kate Walsh, Eric Idle and Maggie Grace
18	8	18 November 2012	Kunal Nayyar, Kerri Kenney and Rob Schneider
19	9	25 November 2012	Sarah Silverman, Judd Apatow and Rashida Jones; Guest appearance: James Van Der Beek
20	10	2 December 2012	Zach Braff, Nicole Richie and Tom Kenny; Guest appearance: Gary Busey
21	11	9 December 2012	Olivia Newton-John and John Travolta; Guest appearance: Gary Busey
22	12	16 December 2012	Michael Bublé, Delta Goodrem and Rob Riggle; Guest appearance: Gary Busey
23	13	23 December 2012	Jesse Tyler Ferguson, Krysten Ritter and Eddie Izzard; Guest appearance: Gary Busey and Ben Folds

== International distribution ==
Rove LA was broadcast primarily on its Australian cable broadcaster network FOX8. Repeat episodes air on both Fox8 and Australian network The Comedy Channel. It can also be seen in the United States on The TV Guide Network.

Country	Network	Title
Australia	FOX8; The Comedy Channel (reruns)	Rove LA
New Zealand	TV3	Rove LA
United Kingdom	E!	Rove LA
United States	TV Guide Network	Rove LA
