= Video Hits (Australian TV series) =

Australian music video TV program

- Presented by: Dylan Lewis (2010–2011); Faustina 'Fuzzy' Agolley (2006–2011); Hayden Guppy (2009); Nathan Sapsford (2007–2008); Axle Whitehead (2004–2006); Kelly Cavuoto (2004)
- Country of origin: Australia
- Original language: English
- No. of seasons: 25

Production
- Production locations: Sydney, Melbourne, Australia
- Running time: 180 mins – 240 mins (dependent on adjacent programming)

Original release
- Network: Network Ten
- Release: 15 February 1987 – 6 August 2011

Related
- The Loop

Video Hits is an Australian music video program that was broadcast from 15 February 1987 to 6 August 2011. From 7 May 2011 it broadcast on Network Ten for two hours each Saturday and Sunday morning: 10 am – 12 pm on Saturdays and 8 am – 10 am on Sundays. At the time of its cancellation, Video Hits was the world's second longest running music show after the Eurovision Song Contest. The show was cancelled in July 2011 and its last episode aired on 6 August 2011.

== History ==
From 1987 to 1999, the show highlighted songs featured in the Australian Music Report chart each week, before switching to the ARIA Report chart in the 2000s. This fluctuated from a Top 40 format to a Top 30, Top 20 and by early 2008, just a Top 10 countdown.

In the late 1990s, an "Interactive Top 10" was introduced with songs supposedly voted in by the public. This was later stopped after claims of vote rigging. One case in particular saw a song by Australian singer Rani (called "Always on My Mind") chart in the Top 5 of the interactive chart for more than six months despite getting limited airplay and peaking at number 33 on the ARIA chart.

Another Australian band Drops Of Light caused a furor amongst major labels when their independently produced clip "Never Knew The Way" was aired in 1989 as a hit prediction with the show assisting the clip to be signed to a worldwide distribution deal. in regards to the citation they were signed to Show Biz Videos a music video distribution company.

In 2003, the show reached 1.5 million viewers every Sunday in metropolitan markets.

Producers included Helen Ryan, Donna Andrews, Gary Dunstan.

From 1987 to 2004, the show featured a non-stop video clip-based format. In 2004, the show introduced a new look and format that included feature interviews each week and clips from different music genres.

During mid to late 2005, the show was broadcast live on Sundays with a live audience at such locations as shopping centres and festivals, this notably included a live broadcast on 4 September 2005 at that year's Royal Adelaide Show at the Adelaide Showground in Wayville, South Australia. Special guests appeared on the show to co-host, such as the Veronicas, the Black Eyed Peas and Melissa Tkautz to name a few.

In 2006, the show was again broadcast live without an audience. The chosen artist picked songs they wanted played along with their own past and present videos in a format similar to ABC's rival music TV show rage. As of April 2007, the show still continued with this format.

Video Hits turned 20 years old in 2006 and celebrated with a special event featuring a countdown of the Top 100 Video Clips of the past twenty years, compiled from online and SMS votes. This countdown was shown again in 2007, with slight differences in the list; however, "Thriller", by Michael Jackson, was voted #1 both times. Instead, in 2008, a special entitled A-Z of Pop was shown.

A new show called Video Hits First premiered in September 2006. The premise for Video Hits First is that it is rated G and suitable for all audiences, after claims throughout the media that certain music videos were sexually explicit. The format also showed the top 10 video clips from the ARIA Charts and it also features competitions and interviews with artists.

Video Hits abandoned its top 10 on Saturdays in 2008 (which was moved to Video Hits First from Video Hits in 2007) and its top 20 on Sundays much earlier in the 2000s.

In mid-late 2009, regional affiliate Southern Cross Ten dropped the show, in order to air their own chart show, known as Hit List TV, based upon the nightly radio show of the same name that goes to air across Macquarie Southern Cross hit stream stations. The show is hosted by Tim Dormer and Renee Peterson (hosts of radio program The Hit List), and shot on location at Gold Coast attractions including Warner Bros. Movie World and Sea World. This also helped the network fulfil, albeit cheaply, their local content requirements imposed by the Australian Communications and Media Authority. Tim replaced Matty Acton who relocated to Sydney for a position at 2Day FM.

In July 2011, it was announced that the show would be cancelled due to a major restructure of Network Ten. The last episode aired on 6 August 2011. The last song played was Every Teardrop is a Waterfall by Coldplay.

== Format ==
Video Hits generally plays Top 40 Australian and overseas titles as well as clips that are being promoted but not in the charts.

Video Hits supports Australian music charts, featuring local artists such as George, Frenzal Rhomb, the John Butler Trio, Little Birdy, Delta Goodrem, the Hampdens, the Cat Empire and the Sleepy Jackson.

Video Hits also hosts various competitions through SMS. In 2005, the show gave away more than $650,000 in prizes.

Video Hits Up-Late (or Video Hits Presents) usually airs in 5-minute-long to 30-minute-long timeslots early in the mornings on some weekdays and weekends. It is similar to the program entitled Nine Presents which usually airs in 10-minute blocks on the Nine Network spontaneously throughout the week.

Video Hits Uncut was a 90-minute- to 120-minute-long show broadcasts late on Friday (some weeks on Thursdays or Wednesdays) nights. It showed "explicit" (some videos, however, were still edited for content) videos that could not be shown on Video Hits in its morning timeslot. It was rated MA15+.

Video Hits Presents is a 30-minute- to 60-minute-long special broadcast after Video Hits on Saturdays and Sundays. It usually details some (or all) of an artist or band's videos, and sometimes an interview with them. It is usually broadcast before or after the artist/band has released a new song/album/DVD or toured the country, but this is not always the case.

== Presenters ==
At the time of its cancellation, the hosts of Video Hits and Video Hits First were Faustina 'Fuzzy' Agolley and Dylan Lewis.

The new format introduced in 2004 included two regular hosts Kelly Cavuoto and Axle Whitehead – former contestants on Australian Idol in 2003. Cavuoto was sacked in late 2004 after appearing at a children's TV award show under the influence of alcohol and Whitehead took over as solo host of the show. Whitehead resigned on 1 November 2006 after exposing himself at the 2006 ARIA Awards, which were held three days earlier.

After Whitehead's resignation, Agolley became host of Video Hits. She has since interviewed many artists including the Black Eyed Peas, Kanye West, Coldplay and Pete Murray. In February 2007, MTV presenter Nathan Sapsford joined and began co-hosting the show. Soon after, he became the sole host, with Agolley going back to only hosting Video Hits First. On special occasions (such as the recent Video Hits special A-Z of Pop), they both share hosting duties. Sapsford left Video Hits in 2009 and his replacement was Hayden Guppy. In December 2009, it was announced that Dylan Lewis would replace Guppy from 2010.

== Compilation albums ==
The following albums were released to promote the Video Hits program:

- Video Hits 1 (1988) on CBS Records
- Video Hits 2 (1989) on CBS Records
- Video Hits Classics (1990) on CBS Records
- Video Hits – Australian Classics (1991) on Sony Music
- Video Hits (1995) on Sony Music
- Video Hits '96 (1996) on Sony Music
- Video Hits – Past Hits Vol. 1 (1997) on Sony Music (2-CD set)
- Video Hits – Past Hits Vol. 2 (1998) on Sony Music (2-CD set)
- Video Hits – Viewer Top 20 Countdown (1998) on Sony Music
- Video Hits – Viewer Hop 20 (2000) on Sony Music
- Video Hits – Ballads (2000) on Sony Music
- Video Hits / Just Dance (2000) on Sony Music (2-CD set)
- Video Hits '86–'96 (2005) on EMI Australia (2-CD set)
- Video Hits '96–'06 (2006) on EMI Australia (2-CD set)
- Video Hits – More Hits (2006) on EMI Australia (3-CD set)
- Video Hits – 20 Years of Australian Hits (2007) on EMI Australia (2-CD set)
- Video Hits First (2008) on EMI Australia (CD/DVD set)
- Video Hits One Hit Wonders (2009) on EMI Australia (3-CD set)
- Video Hits – The Number Ones (2009) on EMI Australia (3-CD set)
- Video Hits – The Greatest Covers (2010) on EMI Australia (3-CD set)
- Video Hits – Summer of Festivals (2011) on EMI Australia (2-CD set)

== DVD compilations ==
The following DVDs were released to promote the Video Hits program:

- Video Hits '86–'96 (2005)
- Video Hits '96–'06 (2006)
- Video Hits – More Hits (2006)
- Video Hits – 20 Years of Australian Hits (2007)
- Video Hits First (2008) (Note: DVD was a bonus on the CD)

== See also ==
- List of Australian music television shows
- List of Australian television series
- List of longest-running Australian television series
