= Roving Enterprises =

Australian television production company

- Type: Television production
- Founders: Rove McManus; Craig Campbell
- Headquarters: Australia
- Website: rovingenterprises.com

Roving Enterprises Pty Ltd is an Australian television production company, owned by television presenter, producer and comedian Rove McManus and his business partner Craig Campbell and managed by General Manager Kevin Whyte. The company is responsible for producing many shows and events, particularly for Network 10.

== Productions ==
Programs with a shaded background indicate the program is still in production.

Title	Network	Years	Format	Duration
Rove	Nine Network; Network Ten	1999; 2000–2009	Variety show	11 seasons, 354 episodes
Silverchair: Beyond the Diorama	Network Ten	2002	Music documentary	1 interview special
ARIA Music Awards	Network Ten; Nine Network	2002–2008, 2023–present	Music awards	8 annual awards ceremonies
Skithouse	Network Ten	2003–2004	Sketch comedy	2 seasons, 19 episodes
Before the Game	Network Ten	2003–2013	AFL talk show	11 seasons, 303 episodes
TEN: Seriously 40	Network Ten	2005	Nostalgia special	1 special
Real Stories	Network Ten	2006	Comedy	1 season, 8 episodes
Are You Smarter than a 5th Grader?	Network Ten	2007–2009	Game show	3 seasons, 34 episodes
Hamish & Andy's American Caravan of Courage	Network Ten	2008	Comedy special	1 special
Hamish & Andy: Re-Gifted	Network Ten	2008–2009	Comedy specials	2 annual specials
The Project	Network Ten	2009–2025	News panel show	16 seasons, 4504 episodes
Rove LA	FOX8	2011–2012	Talk show	2 seasons, 23 episodes
Saturday Night Rove	Network Ten	2019	Variety show	2 episodes, 1 pilot
AACTA Awards	Network Ten	2022–	Film and television awards	

== Fire ==
In October 2004, one of Roving Enterprises production offices in Abbotsford, a Melbourne suburb, was destroyed by a large fire that caused up to $2 million damage and required 16 fire engines and over 50 firefighters to extinguish it. The offices were used for production, graphics editing and wardrobe/props and among the many things lost, the fire destroyed pieces that were to be used for the ARIA Music Awards of 2004 ceremony. The company also lost its costume department, valuable editing equipment, computers and irreplaceable video tapes and digital footage.
