= Peter Helliar =

Australian comedian and broadcaster

Pete Helliar
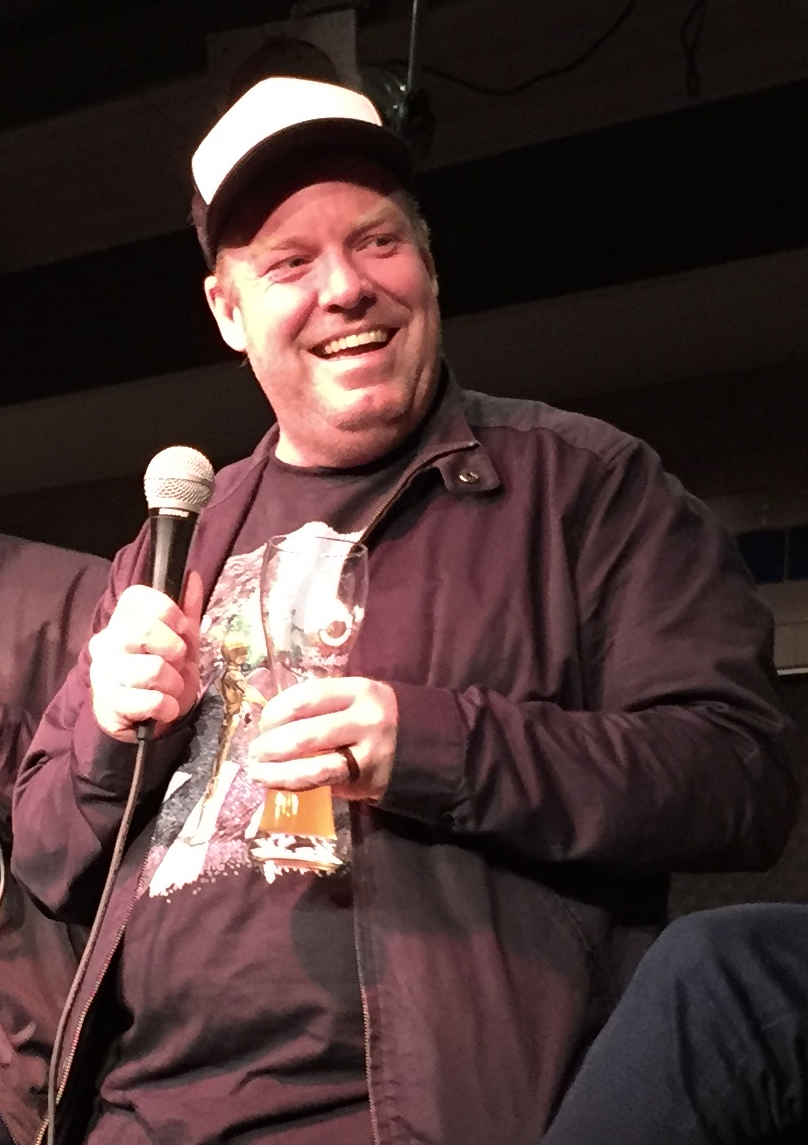
- Helliar in 2017
- Born: Peter Jason Matthew Helliar; 16 June 1975 (age 51); Melbourne, Victoria, Australia
- Occupations: Comedian; actor; television and radio presenter; writer; producer; director
- Years active: 1997−present
- Spouse: Bridget Helliar (m. 2001)
- Children: 3

Peter Jason Matthew Helliar (born 16 June 1975) is an Australian comedian, actor, television, radio presenter, writer, producer and director. He is best known for his work on television as a former regular co-host of The Project on Network Ten from January 2014 to December 2022, replacing previous presenter Dave Hughes to host alongside Carrie Bickmore, Waleed Aly and Lisa Wilkinson. Helliar also appeared with Rove McManus as his sidekick on The Loft Live from 1997 to 1998, on Rove from 1999 and 2009 and in Before the Game as alter ego Bryan Strauchan. Helliar initially worked the Melbourne comedy circuit in the mid-1990s, performing in various venues and the annual Melbourne International Comedy Festival. He has performed in numerous television ads, most notably for Fernwood Fitness. Helliar has been nominated for the Gold Logie, a prestigious award bestowed upon the Most Popular Personality on Television in 2017.

== Career ==
=== Television ===
Helliar has made guest appearances on Melbourne International Comedy Festival, The Loft Live, Rove, The Morning Show, Studio 10, Show Me the Movie!, Celebrity Name Game, All Star Family Feud, Have You Been Paying Attention? and Hughesy, We Have a Problem.

In 1997, Helliar became a regular stand-up comic on RMITV's weekly variety show Under Melbourne Tonight broadcast on C31 Melbourne, hosted by Stephen Hall and Vincent Hedger.

In 1998, Helliar became a regular on Melbourne community television RMITV's weekly variety show The Loft Live broadcast on C31 Melbourne, hosted by Rove McManus and including other well known Melbourne comedians such as Dave Hughes, Kim Hope, and Dave Callan. He appeared as a live on-screen guest as well as scripting and recording skits for live playback.

Helliar rose to national attention in 1999, when he became a regular (aka side-kick) to Rove McManus on Rove, which aired on the Nine Network. In 2000, the show moved networks to Channel Ten, where Helliar and the show remained until its ending in late 2009. Helliar also wrote for the show.

In 2003 and 2004, Helliar was part of an ensemble cast in the comedy sketch program skitHOUSE that ran on Network Ten as well as being sold overseas.

In 2010, Helliar joined the Seven Network to appear on their new "family-friendly" football show, The Bounce, alongside Leigh Matthews and Matthew Richardson. The series was cancelled after just a few weeks.

On 18 May 2010, Helliar was guest co-host on The Morning Show, alongside Kylie Gillies, while Larry Emdur was on holidays. In the summer of 2010 and 2011, he hosted the quiz show The Trophy Room that aired on ABC1.

In 2013, Helliar created, wrote, co-produced and co-directed his own eight-episode comedy series titled It's a Date. It was a strong performer and earned a second season for 2014. The show won the 'Best Scripted Format Award' in the International Format Awards at MIPCOM 2013 in Cannes.

On 7 December 2013, Helliar appeared as one of the co-hosts of The Project from 2014 to 2022, replacing Dave Hughes who had resigned to concentrate on stand-up comedy.

In 2017, Helliar hosted the unsuccessful game show Cram!, broadcast on Channel Ten. The show was very poorly received by viewers, and although a second series was reportedly in the pipeline despite low ratings, it never materialized.

In November 2018, a comedy series How to Stay Married, a spinoff of the aforementioned It's a Date, was released. Created and co-written by Helliar, the series explores life after 15 years of marriage, and starred Peter Helliar as Greg Butler and Lisa McCune as Em Butler. The series aired for three series before being rested in 2021.

From 2 April 2023, Helliar appeared as a contestant in the ninth season of I'm a Celebrity...Get Me Out of Here!. Helliar was eliminated seventh on 25 April 2023.

In July 2023, it was announced that Helliar would be a contestant on the second series of Taskmaster Australia. A new season was filmed to replace that season as the second season, with Helliar's season being pushed to the third season, which aired in the second half of 2024.

In May 2024, Network 10 announced that Helliar would appear as a celebrity contestant on the forthcoming eighth season of The Amazing Race Australia, with his wife Bridget. It is the second celebrity season of the show.

=== Radio ===
Between 1998 and 2000, he was a regular guest on the ABC's national youth network Triple J.

In 2002, the Austereo radio network signed Peter Helliar to appear alongside TV colleagues Rove McManus and Corinne Grant on the weekly program Saturday Morning Rove, broadcasting from Fox FM every Saturday from 10 am to midday after being pre-recorded the day before. In 2004, the program moved to Friday mornings, allowing live phone callers, and was re-titled Rove Live Radio. It was discontinued at the end of 2004.

In 2004, Austereo announced that Helliar will join Judith Lucy and Kaz Cooke to host The Judith Lucy Show on Sydney station 2Day FM. The breakfast program was discontinued after its first year.

Still signed to Austereo, Helliar also appeared on the Melbourne-based The Arvo, a daily program broadcast out of Fox FM between 4 pm and 6 pm and networked to other capital cities. It was discontinued in June 2005.

He also has done his own show called Pete's Show, which aired on 10 am – 12 pm on Fridays across the Today Network.

Helliar filled in for Merrick and Rosso, along with Rove McManus, for their breakfast daily show on Sydney's Nova 96.9 whilst they were on holiday. Helliar also filled in for Kate Langbroek on Hughesy & Kate on Melbourne's Nova 100, while Kate was on maternity leave. It was announced by co-host Dave Hughes that Helliar would begin making appearances on the show every Thursday morning.

In 2008, Helliar began presenting the Triple M Melbourne breakfast spot with Myf Warhurst called Pete & Myf, but the show was axed in July 2009.

Since July 2022, Helliar has hosted the podcast Family Feud: The Podcast for iHeartRadio.

=== Films ===
In 2010, a romantic comedy film called I Love You Too was released. The screenplay was written by Helliar, and he also co-starred in and co-produced the film.

In 2012, Helliar appeared in the Australian comedy film Scumbus.

=== Alter ego ===
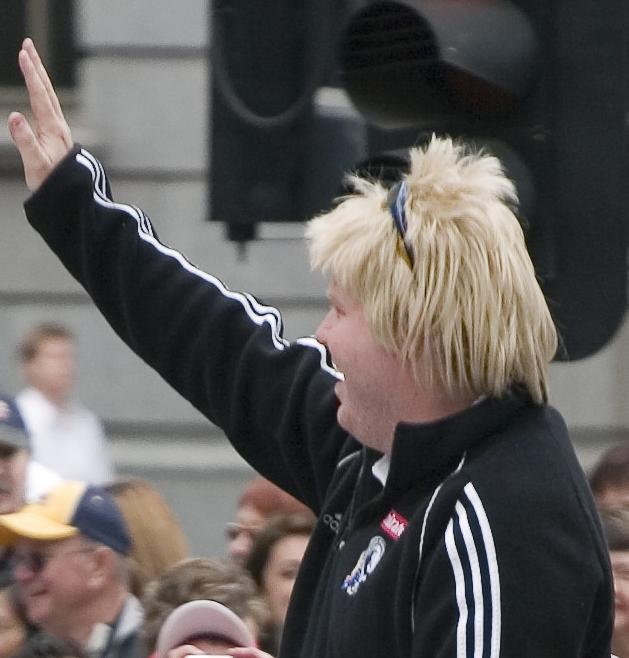
Helliar in character as Bryan Strauchan

For the 2005 AFL season, Helliar created an alter ego named Bryan Strauchan (aka "Strauchanie") who debuted on the television show Before the Game. The character was the supposedly last pick in the 2004 AFL national draft but never managed to get a game for his new club, Collingwood. His name is pronounced (Strawn/Strawny).

For the role, Helliar dons a blonde mullet wig and attempts to play up an Australian bogan stereotype. The comedy is achieved by self-effacing humour, putting Strauchan in situations that highlight his weight, lack of fitness and general inability, while his egotistical personality and delusions of grandeur mean he is completely unaware of these weaknesses. The character of Strauchanie has made several subsequent appearances across different media and has made numerous appearances to support an array of charities.

In the 2009 'EJ Whitten Legends' football match, Helliar broke his ankle late in the game after being tackled. He suggested that this could be the end of his career.

You could be seeing the end of a great career. Doctors say I won't walk again unless there's two blokes on either side of me. I will always stay involved in football; maybe even coach.

— Peter Helliar in the role of Bryan Strauchan

== Personal life ==
Peter grew up in Bundoora, Victoria and attended school at Parade College. He was vice captain of Parade College in his final year and also captained their Second XVIII football team.

Helliar is married to Bridget "Brij" Helliar, and they have three sons. In 2013, Peter and Bridget, together with their three young sons, backpacked around Eastern Europe. Peter summed up the experience by saying "Backpacking with your kids is tough work but hugely rewarding for everyone. Just like parenting, really."

In 2007, he sold a property he owned in Montmorency. In 2016, Helliar sold a luxury property they owned in Plenty. Helliar currently lives in the suburb of Ivanhoe in Melbourne, Victoria.

Media offices
Preceded by Dave Hughes	The Project; Co-host; January 2014 – December 2022	Succeeded by Incumbent
