= Rove Live Radio =

- Other names: Saturday Morning Rove
- Genre: Radio show
- Running time: 120 minutes
- Country of origin: Australia
- Home station: Fox FM Melbourne
- Syndicates: Today Network; Centre FM Alice Springs
- Hosted by: Rove McManus; Corinne Grant; Peter Helliar
- Recording studio: St. Kilda, Victoria
- Original release: 2002 – 26 November 2004
- Audio format: Stereo

Rove Live Radio was a radio programme starring Rove McManus, Corinne Grant, and Peter Helliar. It ran from 2002 to 2004.

It was originally known as Saturday Morning Rove due to its 10 am - 12 pm Saturday timeslot. It was pre-recorded on the preceding Friday. In 2004 it adopted the name Rove Live Radio, and moved to live on Friday mornings to allow live interaction with talkback callers.

It was broadcast from Austereo's Fox FM nationally, and syndicated to many regional stations via MCM Entertainment.
