= Rove McManus =

Australian comedian and television host (born 1974)

Rove McManus AM
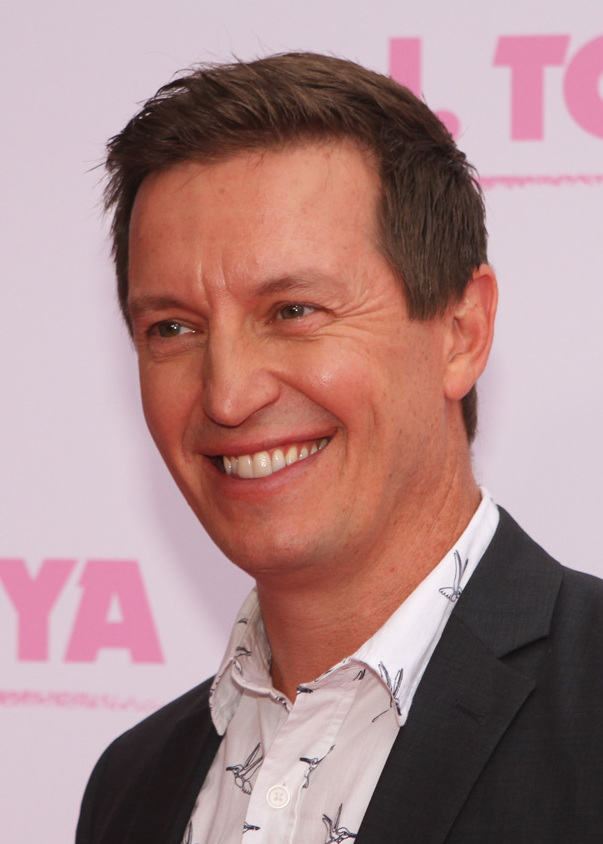
- McManus in 2018
- Born: John Henry Michael McManus; 21 January 1974 (age 52); Perth, Western Australia, Australia
- Occupations: Comedian; television and radio presenter; producer; media personality; writer
- Years active: 1997–present
- Television: Rove
- Spouses: Belinda Emmett (m. 2005; died 2006) Tasma Walton (m. 2009)
- Children: 1

John Henry Michael "Rove" McManus (born 21 January 1974) is an Australian comedian, producer, media personality and television and radio presenter. He was the host of the eponymous variety show Rove and the comedy talk show Rove LA, and is the co-owner of the production company Roving Enterprises with business partner Craig Campbell.

== Early life ==
McManus was born in Perth, Western Australia, to John and Coralie McManus. He attended Orana Catholic Primary School in Willetton before completing grades 8–12 at Corpus Christi College in Bateman. He acquired the nickname "Rove" from his sister as a child and used it as his stage name to prevent people from his high school coming to his shows.

== Performing career ==
=== Live comedy ===
McManus has performed stand-up comedy both nationally and internationally, appearing at events such as the 2010 Just for Laughs festival in Montreal and hosting the 2013 International Comedy Gala. In 2005 and 2008, he undertook live stand-up comedy shows, touring Australian capital cities as well as Wellington and Auckland in New Zealand. During the tour, he returned to Melbourne each Tuesday to film Rove Live.

=== Television ===
McManus has appeared on Good Morning Australia, John Safran vs God, Pulp Sport, The Living Room, The Project, Studio 10, Celebrity Name Game, Have You Been Paying Attention New Zealand? and Hughesy, We Have a Problem. His first recorded television appearance was as a child, when he appeared in the ABC television series Kaboodle as Marty in an episode titled "Marty Makes A Move".

McManus was an animator of the animated series Li'l Elvis and the Truckstoppers, voicing a character in the 1997 episode "Monkey See, Monkey Do". Later that year, McManus began hosting The Loft Live, which was produced by RMIT University's student television station RMITV for the community television station Channel 31. There, he met long-time co-host Peter Helliar. McManus then appeared as a reporter on Foxtel's program In Fashion, hosted by Hugh Jackman. He took an offer from the Nine Network for ten late-night episodes of his own variety show, Rove, in 1999; however, the series was cancelled at the end of its run. In 2000, McManus was offered the opportunity to produce a new version of Rove for Network Ten, launching Rove Live. Rove Live became a prominent show for Network Ten, seeing broadcasts on TV3 in New Zealand, and followed a variety show format, showcasing weekly celebrity guests, comedy acts, variety segments, live bands and local and international comedians.

During the 2004 and 2007 federal elections, McManus unsuccessfully sought to have John Howard, the then–prime minister of Australia, appear on his program. While Howard did not appear, then–opposition leaders Mark Latham and Kevin Rudd appeared on his show in 2005 and 2007 respectively. After being elected prime minister, Rudd appeared on the show again in 2008 and once more on 28 June 2009.

When Bert Newton fell ill in early 2004, McManus was one of many guest presenters who hosted Newton's Good Morning Australia program, presenting its episodes on 24 April and 12 October 2004. The following year, he and Newton co-hosted a Roving Enterprises television special Ten Seriously 40, which examined the history of the Ten Network.

In 2004, McManus appeared in comedian John Safran's television show John Safran vs God in a segment where Safran convinced the controversial UK Muslim cleric Omar Bakri Muhammad to put a fatwa on McManus, showcasing pictures of McManus mocking Islam. The fatwa was later taken off when the pictures were found to be falsified.

In 2005, McManus co-hosted the tsunami appeal Reach Out with fellow presenters Eddie McGuire and Andrew O'Keefe on television networks Seven, Nine and Ten. The appeal raised over $20 million for tsunami relief efforts around Asia and motivated the trio to host the Logie awards together a few months later.

In November 2006, after his wife Belinda Emmett died of breast cancer, McManus took indefinite leave and Rove Live did not screen its last two planned episodes of the year. At the time, there were unfounded rumours circulating in the industry that McManus may quit his television career. He returned, however, in the competitive Sunday 8:30 pm timeslot on 1 April 2007 with a major format overhaul, including renaming the show to simply Rove. Rove achieved its largest audience of 1.69 million viewers. In September 2007, McManus made his debut as a game-show host in the Australian version of the US game show Are You Smarter than a 5th Grader?.

On 2 May 2007, 25 July 2007 and 29 October 2008, McManus appeared as a guest on NBC's The Tonight Show with Jay Leno and later appeared as a regular on the show. In 2011, he hosted a segment titled "Rove Across America" on The Tonight Show. Jay Leno and Ed McMahon also made a small pre-recorded appearance at the beginning of McManus' shows in Los Angeles, offering advice for the night's performance.

On 23 December 2008, McManus made his debut as host on American television as the host of an American Broadcasting Company special The List.

On the 2009 series finale of Rove, shown on 15 November, following several weeks of rumours that the show was going to end, McManus confirmed live on the show that it would be ending with the 2009 finale. He stated, "It's purely my decision. It's not one I've made lightly or flippantly. The timing was right to stop, stand back and see what happens next".

In May 2011, McManus relocated to Los Angeles, California, and began a hosting role on a new talk show, Rove LA. The show debuted on 19 September 2011 on FOX8, with catchup airings on The Comedy Channel, and ran for two years.

In 2013, McManus featured as a subject in the Australian version of the series Who Do You Think You Are?.

McManus has also appeared as a round-table guest on the E! Network late-night talk show Chelsea Lately. He has also made intermittent appearances on TV3's satirical Pulp Sport series, usually performing menial tasks for the hosts, Bill and Ben.

In 2014, McManus hosted Riot, the US version of the French light-entertainment improvisation show Vendredi Tout est Permis ("Friday Anything Goes"). It screened on FOX for one season and its executive producer was Steve Carell.

On 1 May 2014, McManus appeared on the American comedy show @midnight, presented by Chris Hardwick on Comedy Central. He emerged as the winner, being declared by Hardwick as having won the Internet and being the funniest person in the world for the next 23-and-a-half hours.

In April 2015, the Game Show Network in the United States debuted a new show hosted by McManus called Lie Detectors, in which audience members decide which of three comedians is telling the truth.

In 2017, McManus presented the new Australian Broadcasting Corporation panel show Whovians to tie in with their broadcast of the tenth series of Doctor Who; the show aired on ABC TV Plus. Its second season began on 8 October 2018 on ABC TV Plus as a companion to the first episode of the eleventh series of Doctor Who, and as no Doctor Who series aired in 2019, the third series began on 9 February 2020 to tie in with the twelfth series of Doctor Who. He also voiced King Tubby, Cheeta and Last Chance in the children's television series Kitty Is Not a Cat.

In 2018, McManus returned to Network Ten to host a new panel show, Show Me the Movie!.

In 2018, McManus received approval for a new show, Bring Back...Saturday Night, after airing a pilot episode during Network Ten's pilot week. The series premiered on 24 August 2019 under the new title Saturday Night Rove. It lasted two episodes before its cancellation, after viewership dropped from 244,000 to 138,000, below the 200,000 viewers cutoff set by the network.

In 2024, McManus guest starred in the Bluey episode "The Sign", voicing a Toy Fox Terrier real estate agent named Bucky Dunstan.

In 2025, McManus appeared on the comedy quiz show, Big Backyard Quiz.

In 2026 he competed in season 5 of Taskmaster Australia.

=== Radio ===
In 1999, McManus was a regular host on Triple J radio and had a segment on the breakfast show (starring Wil Anderson and Adam Spencer) on Friday mornings, Know Your Millennium, a quiz show that focused on the past.

In 2000, he filled in on Triple M Sydney's Andrew Denton Breakfast Show with co-host Amanda Keller and Mike Fitzpatrick.

In 2002, Austereo commissioned Roving Enterprises to create a weekly radio program starring McManus alongside regular Rove colleagues Peter Helliar and Corinne Grant. The show was originally called Saturday Morning Rove and was broadcast on Fox FM every Saturday from 10 am to midday; it was pre-recorded the day before to allow the performers to have a full weekend of other media commitments. In 2004, the program moved to Friday mornings, allowing live phone callers, and was retitled as Rove Live Radio. It was discontinued at the end of 2004.

In 2006, McManus and Helliar filled in for Merrick and Rosso while they were on holiday. In the first week of their three-week stint, Meshel Laurie of Nova 106.9 also co-hosted the show.

In October 2015, Southern Cross Austereo announced that McManus and Sam Frost would host breakfast on 2Day FM with the show titled Rove and Sam, replacing The Dan & Maz Show. McManus was on a three-year contract beginning from the start of 2016, which included the remuneration of shares valued at $350,000 every six months.

=== Film ===
McManus had a cameo voicing a crab in Pixar's 2003 animated film Finding Nemo. He appeared as himself on the New Zealand cartoon bro'Town and voiced a number of characters in Cartoon Network's Exchange Student Zero.

McManus voiced additional characters in Norm of the North.

In 2014, McManus worked on the film Cookies From Outer Space with Yahoo Serious.

== Roving Enterprises ==
In 2000, McManus started the production company Roving Enterprises; he currently co-owns it with his business partner, Craig Campbell. The company co-produced Rove Live and produced the AFL football comedy panel program Before the Game during their runs on Network Ten. The company also produces The Project. Its past projects include the sketch comedy program Skithouse, the parody show Real Stories, Rove LA and, between 2000 and 2004, the hosting and production of the ARIA Music Awards.

== Awards and nominations ==
McManus was appointed a Member of the Order of Australia in the 2026 King's Birthday Honours in recognition of his "significant service to broadcast media, to entertainment, and to the community".

McManus has won the Gold Logie Award for Most Popular Personality on Australian three times, in 2003, 2004 and 2005, and was nominated for it in 2002, 2006, 2007, 2008, 2009 and 2010. He has won 16 Logie Awards in total and has been nominated for several others for his work on Rove and Are You Smarter than a 5th Grader?. In 2000, McManus was nominated for "Most Popular New Talent – Male" and in 2010, he was nominated for Most Popular TV Presenter.

Association	Year	Award	Result
Logie Awards	2000	Most Popular New Talent	Nominated
Logie Awards	2002	Most Popular Light Entertainment/Comedy (for Rove Live)	Won
Logie Awards	2002	Gold Logie	Nominated
Logie Awards	2003	Most Popular Light Entertainment/Comedy (for Rove Live)	Won
Logie Awards	2003	Most Popular Presenter	Won
Logie Awards	2003	Gold Logie	Won
Logie Awards	2004	Most Popular Light Entertainment Program	Won
Logie Awards	2004	Most Popular Presenter	Won
Logie Awards	2004	Gold Logie	Won
Logie Awards	2005	Most Popular Light Entertainment /Comedy	Won
Logie Awards	2005	Most Popular Presenter	Won
Logie Awards	2005	Gold Logie	Won
Logie Awards	2006	Most Popular Presenter	Won
Logie Awards	2006	Gold Logie	Nominated
Logie Awards	2007	Logie Most Popular Light Entertainment/Comedy	Won
Logie Awards	2007	Most Popular Presenter	Won
Logie Awards	2007	Gold Logie	Nominated
Logie Awards	2008	Most Popular Presenter	Won
Logie Awards	2008	Gold Logie	Nominated
Logie Awards	2009	Most Popular Light Entertainment/Comedy	Won
Logie Awards	2009	Most Popular Presenter	Won
Logie Awards	2009	Gold Logie	Nominated
Logie Awards	2010	Most Popular Presenter	Nominated
Logie Awards	2010	Gold Logie	Nominated

== Charity and community work ==
Between 2008 and 2010, McManus was a director of the Australian chapter of the conservation charity Fauna & Flora International, for a period serving as the vice president. He has been a patron of international wildlife conservation and animal welfare charity Free the Bears since 2019, having first visited a Free the Bears sanctuary in Cambodia in 2008. He regularly hosts fundraising events in support of the charity's work to rescue and rehabilitate threatened bears in Asia and has taken part in the charity's annual "Night in a Cage" fundraising challenge, most notably spending the night in a cage within an abandoned zoo in Tasmania in 2025 and raising almost $15,000.

== Personal life ==
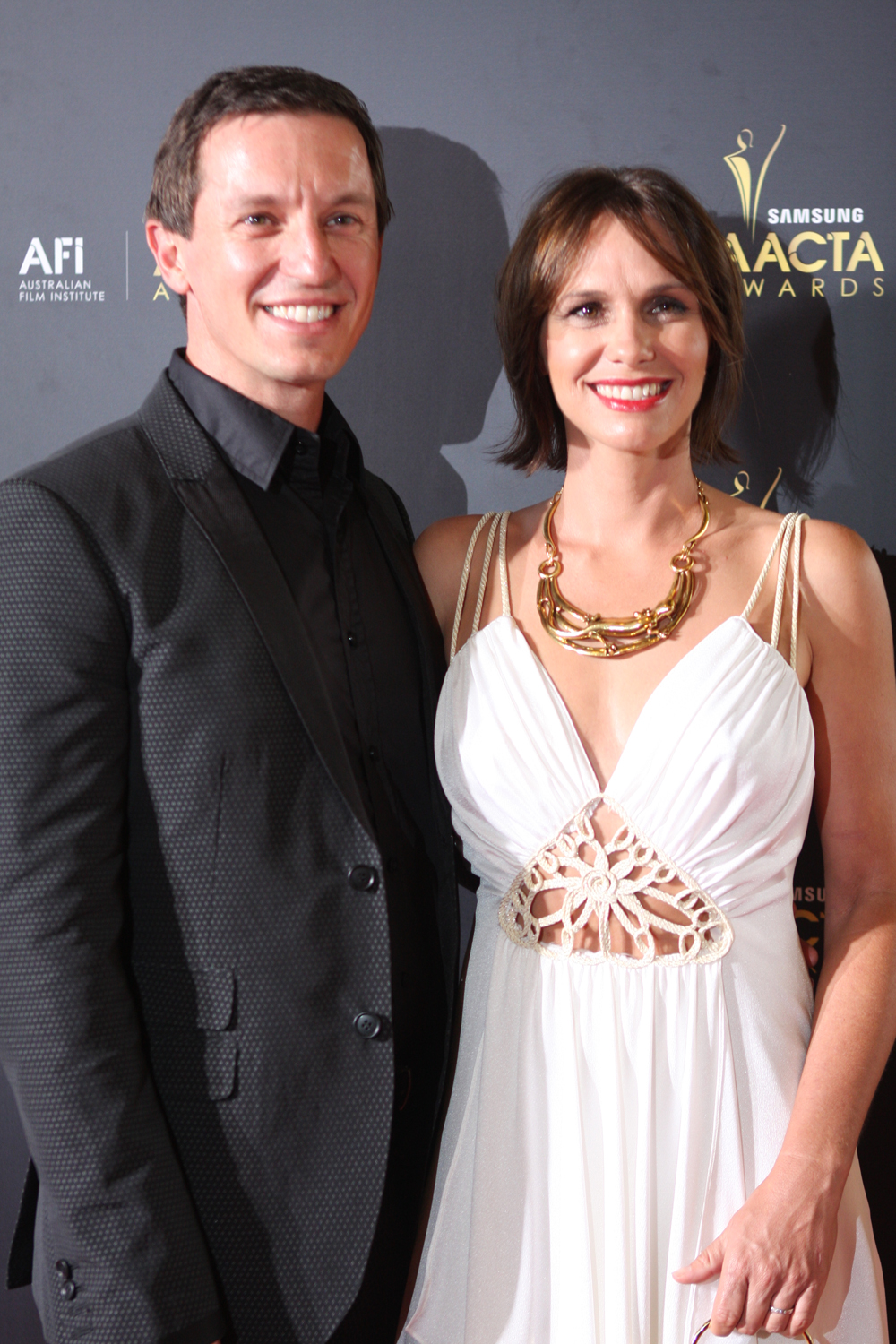
McManus at the 2012 AACTA Awards with his wife Tasma Walton

McManus married actress and singer Belinda Emmett in 2005 at the Mary Immaculate Church in Waverley, an eastern suburb of Sydney. Emmett died of metastatic breast cancer on 11 November 2006 at St Vincent's Hospital in Sydney after eight years with the disease. McManus began dating actress Tasma Walton in October 2007. They married on 16 June 2009 in a private ceremony on a beach in Broome, Western Australia. They have a daughter, born in 2013.

McManus is a supporter of the Fremantle Football Club in the Australian Football League, for which his first cousin Shaun McManus played 228 games. From 2003 to 2005, McManus held the ceremonial position of the club's number-one ticket holder. McManus is also a lifelong fan of professional wrestling; he interviewed wrestlers Ric Flair and John Cena on his talk show and has managed wrestlers as part of the former World Wrestling All-Stars promotion.

On 8 June 2007, he appeared as the presenter of a secondary school discussion at Rod Laver Arena with 14th Dalai Lama Tenzin Gyatso in attendance.
