= Rove (TV series) =

1999–2009 Australian TV series

- The Rove logo used from 2007 until 2009
- Developed by: Roving Enterprises
- Directed by: Gary Newnham (1999); Peter Ots (2000–2009)
- Presented by: Rove McManus
- Starring: Rove McManus; Peter Helliar; Corrine Grant (1999–2005); Hamish Blake (2007–2009); Andy Lee (2007–2009); Ryan Shelton (2007–2009); Liam Pattison (2009); Kristy Warner (2009); Judith Lucy (2009)
- Country of origin: Australia
- Original language: English
- No. of seasons: 11
- No. of episodes: 354

Production
- Executive producer: Craig Campbell
- Running time: Approximately 60 minutes (inc. commercials)

Original release
- Network: Nine Network (1999); Network Ten (2000–2009)
- Release: 22 September 1999 – 15 November 2009

Related
- Rove LA

Rove, also titled Rove Live, is an Australian television variety show that featured live music performances and interviews with local and international celebrity guests. The program premiered on the Nine Network on 22 September 1999, before moving to Network Ten which aired the program from 2000 until November 2009. The show was hosted by comedian Rove McManus through his production company Roving Enterprises, and featured an ensemble cast who presented various segments throughout the course of the show. The show won the Logie Award for "Most Popular Light Entertainment Program" five times (2002, 2003, 2005, 2007 and 2009).

== History ==
=== Origins: The Loft Live ===
Rove McManus began his television career hosting the RMITV-produced The Loft Live on C31 Melbourne, a community-access television station. It was a straightforward tonight show, with a comic monologue from the host, pre-recorded skits and guest interviews. The show had unusually high production values for a community access show.

=== 1999: Rove (Nine Network) ===
The Nine Network developed the show into a commercial production. In 1999, the show, named Rove, ran in a late-night timeslot for 10 episodes. The show featured McManus and three co-hosts he referred to as 'the kids on the couch': Peter Helliar, Corinne Grant and Dave Callan. However, Nine decided not to renew the program and the cast moved to Network Ten the following year.

=== Move to Network Ten ===
==== 2000–2006: Rove Live ====
2006 Rove Live logo

The new show, very similar to the Nine production, was named Rove Live. The show was sometimes known as Rove [Live] or Rove (Live), owing to the use of (square) brackets around the word 'Live' in some of the show's graphics.

Dave Callan left the show after one year, to pursue standup comedy and radio opportunities. Corinne Grant left the show at the end of 2005, to concentrate on The Glass House and other interests. Carrie Bickmore joined the cast in 2006, presenting a parody news segment. Meshel Laurie joined the cast for only one year.

In November 2006, Rove Live was suspended until further notice due to the death of McManus's wife Belinda Emmett. Rove wrote a personal message on the Rove Live website, saying that it "is a very difficult period for all of us and some time away is the best thing for me right now".

==== 2007–2009: Rove ====
The show reverted to the title of Rove in 2007. Production moved from the Global Television facility in Nunawading to the old Seven Network studios in South Melbourne. It now occupied the premium timeslot of 8:30pm on Sunday nights.

Peter Helliar returned to McManus's side. Bickmore's role in the show increased. Following the cancellation of the show The Glass House, Dave Hughes joined Rove. The comedy duo Hamish & Andy, who had previously collaborated with Roving Enterprises with their television show Real Stories, began appearing every second week. Their associate Ryan Shelton also began presenting a segment each week.

Each year, the show's set changes in some way from the previous. In a previous year, the set was changed to be less like a traditional late-night talk show and more like a variety show. In 2007, the show's set was reconfigured back into a more traditional late-night talk show again, even going so far as having a view of the Melbourne cityscape in the background.

In July 2007, a special show was filmed at Times Square in New York. Rove, Helliar and Adam Hills attended, and a live Australian audience was present. In late July a second special was filmed in Los Angeles at the Bob Barker Studio.

Hayden Guppy now also co-host of Video Hits also became a cast member, who shows TV viewers what the cast does during ad breaks.

In 2008, Myf Warhurst, who co-hosted a breakfast radio show with Peter Helliar on Triple M, joined the cast as an infrequent addition whenever a regular cast member was unavailable. Again in 2008, Elmo returned as a guest.

In 2009 the program moved premises to ABC studios in Elsternwick which housed a new set. Dave Hughes, Hamish Blake and Andy Lee began only appearing on a fortnightly basis. Between May and July 2009, actor Brian Wenzel had a weekly skit at the end of the show.

After 12 July, the show went off-air to let the team take a mid-year break due to the show starting in February (earlier than 2007 and 2008). It was also announced that this episode would be Bickmore's and Hughesy's final episode as regular cast members, due to them both leaving to focus on their new show, The 7pm Project, which premiered on 20 July 2009, and is also produced by Roving Enterprises.

=== Series finale ===
Various news reports appeared in the lead-up to the scheduled season finale for the 2009 season of Rove that it would be the final season. The Herald Sun originally reported that McManus had confirmed that his show would not return until later in 2010. Despite not appearing on a list of shows at Ten's 2010 launch event, it was rumoured that Rove would return in 2010 with a new format, similar to Hey Hey It's Saturday, which rated over two million viewers for its two reunion shows. McManus made a comment to the Herald Sun and stated: "This show is my love and my passion and it's always what I've wanted to do." McManus then continued to say "If everything else fell down, as long as I still get to do this thing I love then I’m happy. We have that connection with the audience at the moment and that's where my enthusiasm is coming from."

However, rumours appeared the day before the 2009 finale of Rove in that "staff on his TV show were told this week to look for alternative work next year." Ten's publicity department denied these claims by stating: "We have checked with Roving (Enterprises) and no such discussion was had. As for what changes may or may not be made with Rove for 2010, this will be announced on the show this Sunday, stay tuned." McManus was spotted earlier dining with Merrick Watts and Peter Helliar in Sydney, prompting talk that he might return to radio in 2010.

The rumour of the show ending later revealed to be true, as, during the finale on 15 November 2009, McManus confirmed that the show would be ending with the 2009 finale. He said: "It's purely my decision. It's not one I've made lightly or flippantly. The timing was right to stop, stand back and see what happens next."

The final show finished at 11:11pm with a montage of clips from the 2009 season and a performance by Powderfinger. Rove's last words was a variation of his signature sign-off: "I'm Rove McManus. Say bye to your mum for me."

== Cast ==
=== Main cast ===
- Rove McManus (1999–2009)
- Hamish Blake (2007–2009)
- Andy Lee (2007–2009)
- Peter Helliar (1999–2009)
- Ryan Shelton (2007–2009)
- Corinne Grant (1999–2005)
- Carrie Bickmore (2006–2009)
- Dave Callan (1999–2000)
- Meshel Laurie (2006)
- Judith Lucy (2009)
- Dave Hughes (2007–2009)
- Ron Steward (2006)
- Kristie Warner (2009)

== Secondary cast ==
- Jess Harris (2009)
- Nick Maxwell (2008–2009)
- Liam Pattison (2008)
- Tom Piotrowski (2008)
- Hayden Guppy (2008–2009)
- Myf Warhurst (2008–2009)
- Brian Wenzel (2009)

== Format ==
The show starts with Rove performing a comedic monologue about a variety of news events that have occurred during the previous week. He then introduces Peter Helliar and the other cast members present on the couch that week.

PeteSpace, a parody of social-networking website MySpace, consists of Helliar presenting a selection of celebrities, news-makers and online video clips that make up his top events of the week.

Kristy at the news desk, presented by Kristy Warner, was a parody news report, similar to the long-running Weekend Update segment of the American sketch show, Saturday Night Live (replaced Carrie at the news desk from 17 August 2009 onwards).

Judith Lucy presented by Judith Lucy. Lucy delivers a satirical and comedic commentary on a personal or newsworthy topic (Replaced Hughsey! from 17 August 2009 onwards).

Throughout each show, Rove will interview several celebrity guests. Each interview ends with a segment titled Public Probe where he will ask his guests five different questions that have been posted to the website by the general public. At the end of the interview, Rove would usually spruik the product or event that guest was promoting, and the words The Plug will appear on the screen.

Throughout the course of the show, a variety of other segments are shown, presented by members of the Rove cast:

- Kevin Rudd PM was a small dramatic-comedy mini-series about the Australian Prime Minister Kevin Rudd. The series involves video news clips of Rudd that are spliced together.

Two other segments are occasionally shown, not necessarily every week.

- Hamish & Andy Comedians Hamish Blake and Andy Lee presented a pre-recorded report, frequently on location overseas.
- Ryan Shelton also presented a segment known as Philosophisationing with Ryan Shelton.

The final segment of the show was What Have We Learnt?, in which each cast member, and usually each guest, give a humourus example of what they have learned during the week. Peter Helliar always answers last and ends with "and you can read all about it in my new book..."

The show will usually end with a live performance from a band in the studio, and McManus will end the show by saying his trademark line "Say hi to your mum for me!" Starting in 2005 the band performs before the closing credits. In previous years the credits would roll while the band performed. In 2006, Rove had a house band, which may have been the same band as the main act, or an Australian band of much smaller stature than the main act. They would play live music when returning from ad breaks.

=== Former show elements ===
- 20 bucks in 20 seconds was a titled segment at the end of an interview with a guest where Rove would ask questions for twenty seconds. Once the time was up, Rove would always ask the question: "Who would you turn gay for?" (if the guest was openly gay, the question would be changed to "Who would you turn straight for?"). A popular solution to this question was to respond "I'd turn gay for you, Rove". In a particular episode featuring known prankster and member of The Chaser team, Chas Licciardello, Licciardello expressed his annoyance that everyone answered "I'd turn gay for you, Rove" but that nobody ever followed up on it. He then leapt on Rove and French kissed him, before licking Rove on the face. This segment was again replaced by Final Five in 2009, and halfway through the 2009 series, it changed once again and became the "Public Probe", where Rove would ask the guest 5 questions submitted online from the public.
- All That Glitters: Rove, along with regular presenters and guest artists perform a scripted radio play with the help of a Foley artist live on the show.
- Amazing Talents: Viewers with 'amazing' (or just plain bizarre) 'talents' are brought to the studio and given a few minutes to display their skills. This could be balancing lawn furniture, or nailing a fork into each nostril. This is comparable to the "Stupid Human Tricks" segment on the Late Show with David Letterman.
- Carrie at the Newsdesk was a parody news report, similar to the long-running Weekend Update segment of the American sketch show, Saturday Night Live. The segment had been presented by a variety of personalities in Bickmore's absence. While on maternity leave in 2007, Bickmore was replaced by Jane Hall and Meshel Laurie. In 2008, Bert Newton and Myf Warhurst have presented the segment when Bickmore was ill.
- Final Five where he will ask his guests five different questions and often include their opinion on something that has happened during the week in popular culture (such as asking Alan Cumming what he thought of Matthew Newton's bum in Underbelly: A Tale of Two Cities). The last question was always a visual question where Rove will show the interviewee an unusual image and ask them to say what they think about the image.
- Flick Your Switch: The show broadcasts a live video shot of an area of an Australian city. Rove then asks those residents of the area who are watching the show and willing to respond to flick their houselights on and off, sometimes to give answers to questions.
This segment started in 2004 when Rove pointed a camera at Kirribilli House and asked the Prime Minister of Australia, John Howard, to flick his light switch if he was willing to be interviewed on the show. When the desired result was not achieved, Rove then asked the neighbours to flick their switch if they would try to help get Howard on the show. On 19 April 2005, Rove succeeded in his goal of getting someone at Kirribilli house to flick their switch. A special ferry filled with participants in a dress-up competition for the show stopped on Sydney Harbour outside Kirribilli House, the passengers chanting "Flick your switch". Rove and viewers were surprised to see the lights flick. It was neither Mr or Mrs Howard as they were both on an international visit at the time. It is believed that it was one of Howard's children or an aide.
The show Don't Forget Your Toothbrush had a similar element for the second season involving the audience flashing their house lights on and off at a prescribed moment. A camera in a mystery location would search for someone taking part, thus selecting him or her to play a game that involved throwing things out of his or her windows.
- Guides: Rove, Pete and Corinne created guides to help people. The guides they did were: Guide To Having A Baby, Guide To Driving, Guide To Breaking Up, Guide To House Hunting and Guide To Job Interviews.
- Hang Up, Don't Hang Up: Rove called a regular audience member from a different time zone, and tried to engage in conversation. However, during the call Peter Helliar revealed random instructions from the keypad of an oversized phone prop. For example, Sing your words, or Make the live-lister say the word "bucket". If Peter pulled out Hang up, Rove hung up and ended the call without saying goodbye or even finishing his sentence.
- Hot Topic: A vox populi segment, in which purportedly random people were asked their opinions. These answers were evidently scripted, and many of their responses included references to Network Ten shows.
- Hughesy! was presented by Dave Hughes. Hughes delivered a satirical and comedic commentary on a personal or newsworthy topic.
- Hughesy Loses It: Dave Hughes engaged in a weekly rant about something trivial, this is very similar to Nickelodeon's "Dave's Raves" a years prior by Dave Lawson on Sarvo. He often used the catchphrase 'Seriously!'
- Help Me Hughesy!: Dave Hughes responded humorously to viewer questions, frequently with taped reports.
- I Want My Stuff Back: Rove helps a 'Live Lister' receive back property that they have lent to someone.
- It Takes You: Parody of It Takes Two, in which Rove picked a member of the audience to sing with a celebrity. This segment appeared once on 3 June 2007. The professional was Dean Geyer.
- Live List: Viewers can register their name, address and various other details on the show's website to join the Live List. A broadcast team will occasionally visit a viewer (the first the viewer knows about it is when they see the front of their house live on television). What happens from then on varies greatly—from performing a quick two-minute interview live from their house, to being sent away to perform a certain task (usually to win a prize), sometimes being sent as far away as Fiji, New York City or the United Kingdom.
- My Charader: Charades. The title is a play on the song "My Sharona" by The Knack. The game is hosted by Rove and involves two teams. Before Corinne Grant left the show, she and a guest would play on one team, and Peter Helliar and a guest on the other team.
- Not So Frequently Asked Questions: Rove, Peter and Corinne are asked questions that aren't asked very often. This usually ends with a pre-recorded skit.
- The Pentagon of Probable Embarrassment: Rove has an audience member spin a wheel with a one in five chance of winning $5000, although the other four items on the wheel are repelling. Other items on the wheel included: "Breakfast in your pants", "Kiss Pete's Grandma", "Soup on your head", "Eat a Fish Eye" and "Mega-Wedgie".
- Petesclusive: Peter Helliar will chat to a 'guest' (celebrity or world figure) who has recently been involved in a famous story or scandal. Helliar's guests are a photograph of the famous person with his or her mouth digitally replaced by Rove's mouth. This is similar to a regular bit on Late Night with Conan O'Brien.
- Ron's Review: 78-year-old Ron Steward reviewed a new movie and a rating out of 5 stars. Ron's Review occurred around every three weeks. Peter Helliar also reviews the same movie. The main humorous appeal of this segment was that Ron was quite an elderly man which led to a variety of jokes regarding Ron's age, which, although many were at his own expense, he appeared to take in good humor. Another humorous part of the segment is Ron's ever-recurring rating of three-and-a-half stars (out of 5). In 2006 Rove conducted a semi-humorous campaign to have Ron nominated for the best newcomer Logie Award.
- Rove's Audience's Got Talent: Parody of Australia's Got Talent, where Rove plucked a member of the audience and put them into a performance utilising a particular talent. Peter Helliar, Dave Hughes and a celebrity guest acted as judges. This segment has only occurred twice.
- Roving with Rove: A pre-recorded vox populi segment in which McManus asks people in street for their thoughts.
- Rydeas: Comedian Ryan Shelton presented a new invention or idea, often incorporating the syllable 'Ry'.
- So Rove's Audience Thinks They Can Dance: Parody of So You Think You Can Dance, where Rove picks a member of the audience, dresses him or her in an unusual costume, and forces him/her to dance. Like It Takes You, this segment has only appeared once.
- Sex Office: a drama/sitcom style television show set in the 1970s, in which everyone in the office (except one individual) is engaging in frequent casual sex.
- Tell Us Where To Go: At a viewer's request, Corinne Grant was sent on location somewhere in Australia to witness a local event, to see a local landmark or to meet a local personality. The segment is pre-recorded and introduced by Rove and Corinne in front of a large map of Australia (without Tasmania) lowered onto the stage. At the end of the segment, Corinne gives Rove a present from the adventure (something sexual or inappropriate or both), and a magnet is placed on the drop-down map approximately where the location was. Due to Australia being very closely populated on the eastern coast, and southeastern corner in particular, the "approximate" placement of the magnets has been evermore loosely interpreted. This segment was dropped with the departure of Grant in 2005.
- Two Minutes at Your House: In addition to being chosen to participate in stunts and contests, "Live List-ers", as they are referred to, may be visited by the show's camera crew for a live crossover to their house lasting about two minutes. In reality, these segments are often well beyond the suggested two minutes, as the timer doesn't commence counting down until the person has been verified to be at home, and Rove tells the clock to start. If a particular story isn't finished, pet not shown, or talent not displayed, the segment will often continue even if the timer has expired. Some broadcasts have hinted at prior planning of the segment.
- What's Hot, What's Not: Rove would describe something that is hot (popular) at the moment and compare it with something that is not (e.g. What's Hot – Lamborghinis. What's Not – Lamb Bikinis. What's Hot – Desperate Housewives. "What's Not" – Dentist Archives).
- What the...?: Rove receives viewer submissions of objects that might make one say "What the...?" The submissions could be newspaper clippings, DVD boxes, photographs of odd signs or animals doing inappropriate things to each other. Many are mistakes of translation from foreign languages or other unintentional humor. This segment was abandoned in 2007.
- Who's in the Swivel Chair?: A celebrity was pushed around the studio on a swivel chair. Each week the name of the celebrity was announced by Bruce Mansfield.
- Words that sound better when said by Dave: Dave Callan recited certain words and names which, owing to his thick Irish accent, sound quaint to the Australian audience. The sketch was abandoned when Callan left after the first series in 2000. Some of Callan's famous words include: 'trousers', 'haberdashery', 'Archbishop Desmond Tutu' and 'man-boob'.
- Joke credits: At the end of every episode there were fake credits shown with the real credits. There was a common theme for the credits each week.
- Song parodies: Rove performs a parody of a recent music video. He has parodied Shannon Noll's "What About Me", Missy Higgins's "Scar", Britney Spears' "Oops!... I Did It Again" and Sophie Ellis-Bextor's "Murder on the Dancefloor".
- Sketches: Rove, Pete and Corinne Grant performed three sketches on the show together. The first one was about a sleepover, the second was about wheelchair rugby and the third was about horse racing.

== Ratings ==
The show sometimes struggled in the ratings. This was most obvious in the ratings for the final show of 2005, which was broadcast on 22 November. The show gave away six cars, and had media heavyweights Bert Newton, Jerry Seinfeld and Kath & Kim as guests. The show rated 19th for the day, with only 797,000 viewers nationwide.

On 16 May 2006, the ratings peaked over a million for the first time since 2002 when 1,040,762 viewers watched nationwide. This episode involved an intruder entering the Big Brother house live during the show. The final episode for 2006 attracted only 700,000 viewers nationally. This wasn't intended to be the final episode, but it eventuated as the result of the death of McManus' wife Belinda Emmett.

The first episode of the revamped series, which began 1 April 2007, attracted 1,693,000 viewers nationwide, and was the highest-rated program for the day. For the second episode of the season, which aired on 8 April, viewership fell to 999,000. The third episode was shown on 22 April, achieving around 1,073,000 viewers. Throughout its run, the show consistently rated above 1 million viewers nationally.

Rove's final show for 2007 featured then Leader of the Opposition Kevin Rudd, as well as Australian Greens leader Bob Brown, comedian Jerry Seinfeld and actor Jason Donovan. It was watched by 1.368 million viewers. The season premiere for 2008, broadcast on 30 March, only attracted 777,000 viewers.

Eight hundred and fifty-five thousand viewers watched the 2009 return of Rove, up nearly 100,000 viewers on the previous year. Ratings frequently average 800,000 to 1 million viewers.

== International broadcasters ==
In 2004, the show began broadcasting on TV3 in New Zealand at a late-night time slot. The show quickly gained a following and was given a primetime slot on Friday nights (8:30pm–9:30pm). It was not broadcast live in New Zealand (in spite of its former title Rove Live); rather, it was televised five days after the Australian broadcast.

== Controversy ==
On 28 June 2009, McManus interviewed Sacha Baron Cohen (appearing in character as Brüno Gehard). During the course of the interview, Brüno joked that "I hear [Cohen's] wife gets less sex than Katie Holmes", a reference to long-time rumours of her then-husband Tom Cruise being gay. However, when televised, the words "Katie Holmes" were censored. A further joke at the expense of Holmes towards the end of the interview was not even televised. Throughout the interview, Brüno made numerous jokes about other celebrities, especially Prime Minister Kevin Rudd. These jokes were not similarly censored.

== Other media ==
=== Radio ===
Rove, Peter and Corinne hosted a radio program originating from FOX FM in Melbourne for Austereo's Today Network, as well as selected regional stations, until 2004. It was initially known as Saturday Morning Rove. It was then called Rove Live Radio.

=== Soundtracks ===
Two soundtracks were released by Sony featuring musical performances from the show, one in November 2001 and the second in November 2002. Both albums peaked within the ARIA top 40.

==== Rove Live... Some Music track listing ====
1. "Amazing" – Alex Lloyd (4:00)
2. "Somewhere in the City" – Paul Kelly (3:22)
3. "Runaway Train" – Kasey Chambers (3:43)
4. "Just the Thing" – Paul Mac featuring Peta Morris (4:04)
5. "Not That Kind" – Anastacia (3:31)
6. "Three Dimensions" – Something for Kate (3:50)
7. "Little Things" – Good Charlotte (3:51)
8. "'Coz I'm Free" – Christine Anu (3:45)
9. "Shining Star" – Even (3:24)
10. "Made Me Hard" – The Whitlams (3:29)
11. "Don't You Know Me" – Mark Seymour (3:51)
12. "Get Up" – You Am I (3:10)
13. "Take Me Away" – Lash (3:41)
14. "Leroy" – Wheatus (3:41)
15. "Bitter Words" – Area-7 (3:33)
16. "Coulda Woulda Shoulda" – Judith Durham (1:16)
17. "The Many Sounds of What the...?" – Rove (2:19)

==== Charts ====
Chart performance for Rove Live... Some Music
Chart (2001)	Peak position
Australian Albums (ARIA)	46

==== Rove Live... Some More Music track listing ====
1. "Superman (It's Not Easy)" – Five for Fighting (3:39)
2. "Without You" – Silverchair (3:39)
3. "One Day in Your Life" – Anastacia (3:40)
4. "Breathe in Now" – George (4:03)
5. "Nasty Girl" – Destiny's Child (2:44)
6. "Carry On" – Motor Ace (5:03)
7. "If Tomorrow Never Comes" – Ronan Keating (3:49)
8. "We Are All Made of Stars" – Moby (3:40)
9. "Strange Relationship" – Darren Hayes (4:53)
10. "Fall for You" – The Whitlams (3:38)
11. "New Technology" – Waikiki (3:09)
12. "Everybody's Laughing" – Alex Lloyd (3:01)
13. "California" – Phantom Planet (3:54)
14. "Outside of Me" – Killing Heidi (4:00)
15. "A Tribute to Alf Stewart" – The Saturday Morning Rove Team feat. Ray Meagher (Hidden Track)

==== Charts ====
Chart performance for Rove Live... Some More Music
Chart (2002/03)	Peak position
Australian Albums (ARIA)	35

== See also ==
- List of Australian television series
