= Sobriety =

Condition of being unaffected by alcohol

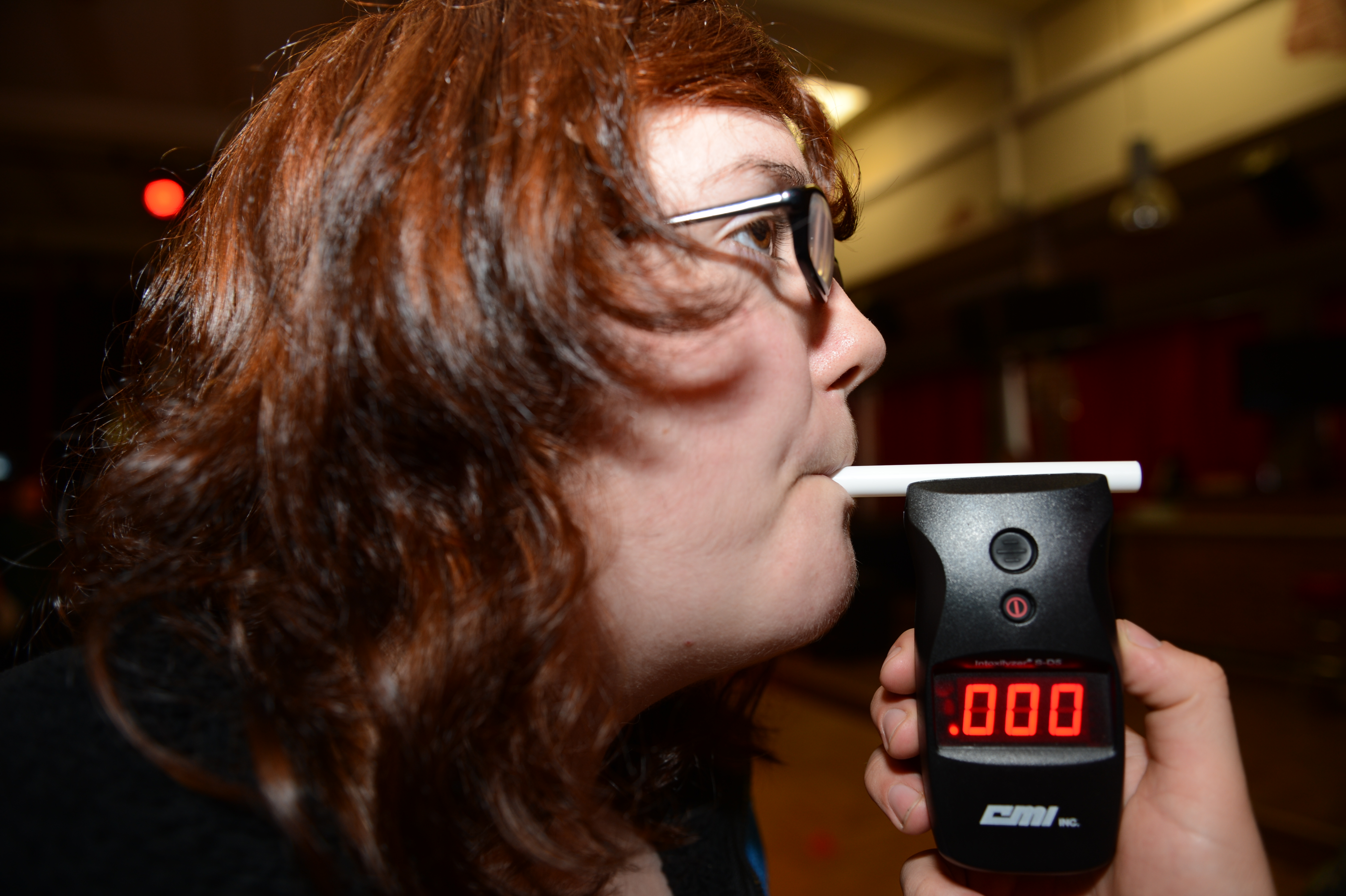
A breathalyzer is used to test for alcohol sobriety

Sobriety is the condition of not having any effects from alcohol and other drugs. Sobriety is also considered to be the natural state of a human being at birth. A person in a state of sobriety is considered sober. Organizations of the temperance movement have encouraged sobriety as being normative in society.

In a treatment setting, sobriety is the achieved goal of independence from consuming alcohol. As such, sustained abstinence is a prerequisite for sobriety. Early in abstinence, residual effects of alcohol consumption can preclude sobriety. These effects are labeled "PAWS", or "post-acute-withdrawal syndrome". Someone who abstains, but has a latent desire to resume use, may be termed a "dry drunk" and not considered truly sober. An abstainer may be subconsciously motivated to resume alcohol consumption, but for a variety of reasons, abstains (e.g. a medical or legal concern precluding use).

Sobriety has more specific meanings within specific contexts, such as the culture of many substance use recovery programs, law enforcement, and some schools of psychology. In some cases, sobriety implies the achievement of "life balance", or reflects a broader aspiration to a simpler and less material lifestyle.

== Recovery support programs ==
Sobriety may refer to being clear of immediate or residual effects of any mind-altering substances. Colloquially, it may refer to a specific substance that is the concern of a particular recovery support program (e.g. alcohol, marijuana, opiates, or tobacco). "Clean and sober" is a commonly used phrase, which refers to someone having an extended period without alcohol or other drugs in their body.

Recovery can start in many different ways for all people. One may go to rehab, a detox center or engage a sober companion to start. The next recovery support program may be slightly more difficult to find. Sober living can be confusing using any generic search engine. Recovery resources exist for many different companies, mainly across the United States.

Alcoholics can also use books, podcasts and online resources to help their own recovery.

== Temperance organizations ==
Organizations of the temperance movement have encouraged sobriety as being normative in society. The Woman's Christian Temperance Union disseminates literature on the living a sober lifestyle, while fraternal organisations such as the Independent Order of Rechabites and International Organisation of Good Templars provide a space for teetotalers to socialize.

== Law enforcement ==
Field sobriety tests and breathalyzer testing are two ways law enforcement officers often test for sobriety in a suspected high or drunk driver. In the US, these "standardized field sobriety tests" are at the officer's discretion. They can also administer other tests including blood and urine tests. In other countries (for example The Netherlands), only breathalizer and blood testing is used. Standardized tests that can be performed in the US include:

- One-leg stand test
- Walk and turn test
- HGN (eye) test (horizontal gaze nystagmus test)

Non-standardized tests include:

- Romberg's test
- Finger-to-nose test
- Finger-count test
- Hand pat test
- Alphabet recitation test
- Counting numbers backwards

Since these tests rely on cooperation of the subject, the final result often depends on the presiding officer's interpretation. There are many factors that can lead to inaccuracies in sobriety testing including orthopedic or neurologic conditions, and fatigue.

== Sober curious ==
Sober curious is a cultural movement and lifestyle of practicing none or limited alcohol consumption which started spreading in the late 2010s, in particular among people from the millennial generation. Sober curiosity is often defined as having the option to question or change one's drinking habits, for mental or physical health reasons. It may be practised in many ways, ranging from complete abstinence to thinking more about when and how much one actually wants to drink.

== Etymology ==
The word "sobriety" comes from the Latin word sobrietas, which means moderation or temperance, especially in avoiding excess—like not drinking too much. It passed through Old French (sobriete) before entering English around the 1400s. Earlier, a similar form sobrete was used in Middle English around 1300. Over time, its meaning expanded to include seriousness or steadiness as well.

== See also ==
- Health benefits of quitting alcohol
- Sober living environment
- Straight edge (subculture)
- Temperance and Good Citizenship Day
- Temperance fountain
