= Elementary (TV series) =

2012 American procedural drama television series

- Genre: Comedy drama; Crime drama; Mystery; Procedural
- Created by: Robert Doherty
- Based on: The works of Sir Arthur Conan Doyle
- Starring: Jonny Lee Miller; Lucy Liu; Jon Michael Hill; Aidan Quinn; John Noble; Nelsan Ellis; Desmond Harrington; James Frain
- Composer: Sean Callery
- Country of origin: United States
- Original language: English
- No. of seasons: 7
- No. of episodes: 154 (list of episodes)

Production
- Executive producers: Robert Doherty; Sarah Timberman; Carl Beverly; John Coles; John Polson; Jason Tracey
- Producers: Alysse Bezahler; Geoffrey Hemwall; Melissa Owen; Carol Cuddy
- Production locations: New York, United States
- Cinematography: Nelson Cragg; Ron Wesley; Tom Houghton; Peter Reniers
- Editors: Gerald Valdez; Sondra Watanabe
- Running time: 43–46 minutes
- Production companies: Hill of Beans Productions; Timberman-Beverly Productions; CBS Television Studios

Original release
- Network: CBS
- Release: September 27, 2012 – August 15, 2019

Elementary is an American procedural comedy-drama television series that presented a contemporary update of Arthur Conan Doyle's character Sherlock Holmes. Created by Robert Doherty and starring Jonny Lee Miller as Sherlock Holmes and Lucy Liu as Dr. Joan Watson, the series aired on CBS for seven seasons from September 27, 2012, to August 15, 2019, consisting of 154 episodes. The series was set and filmed primarily in New York City.

The show follows Holmes, a recovering drug addict and former consultant to Scotland Yard, as he assists the New York City Police Department in solving crimes. His indifference to police procedure often leads to conflict with Captain Thomas Gregson (Aidan Quinn), although the two still remain respectful of one another. Holmes is accompanied by Dr. Joan Watson (Lucy Liu), who initially acts as his sober companion. She is a former surgeon and was hired by Sherlock's father to help him in his rehabilitation. They eventually work together on his cases; in time she becomes Holmes's apprentice and later his professional partner. The series also features Holmes's ongoing conflict with his nemesis and former lover Jamie Moriarty (Natalie Dormer). Other supporting roles include Jon Michael Hill as Detective Marcus Bell, Rhys Ifans as Sherlock's brother Mycroft Holmes, and John Noble as Sherlock's father Morland Holmes.

Before the series premiered, it was met with some criticism, as it followed closely on the heels of the BBC's modern adaptation Sherlock. After the premiere, it was picked up for a full season and later an extra two episodes. The season two premiere was partly filmed on location in London. The series was well-received by critics, who praised the performances, writing, and novel approach to the source material.

== Plot ==
Following his fall from grace in London and a stint in drug rehabilitation, a modern-day version of Sherlock Holmes relocates to Manhattan, where his wealthy father forces him to live with a sober companion, Dr. Joan Watson. Formerly a successful surgeon until she lost a patient, Watson views her current job as another opportunity to help people. However, Sherlock is nothing like her previous clients. He informs her that none of her expertise as an addiction specialist applies to him and that he has devised his own post-rehab regimen: resuming his work as a police consultant in New York City. Watson has no choice but to accompany her mercurial new charge on his jobs.

Over time, Sherlock finds her medical background helpful, and Watson realizes she has a talent for investigation. Sherlock's police contact, New York City Police Captain Thomas Gregson, knows from previous experience working with Scotland Yard that Sherlock is brilliant at solving cases and welcomes him as part of the team. The investigative group also includes Detective Marcus Bell, an investigator with sharp intuition and intimidating interrogation skills. Although initially skeptical of Holmes and his unorthodox methods, Bell begins to recognize Sherlock as an invaluable asset in solving his cases.

The series has its own group of collaborators equal to The Baker Street Irregulars, who act as a network to get intel. This group in Elementary is called Everyone. It is a cyber-activist or hacker collective who may assist Holmes to get him things or intel otherwise hard to come by. Only their aid comes with a price. Usually Sherlock has to pay by somehow humiliating himself. The group may offer their help, if they want to hurt the authorities or people. What price has to be paid and if they are willing to help, is always negotiated on case-to-case basis.

== Episodes ==
Season	Episodes	Originally released	
Season	Episodes	First released	Last released
1	24	September 27, 2012	May 16, 2013
2	24	September 26, 2013	May 15, 2014
3	24	October 30, 2014	May 14, 2015
4	24	November 5, 2015	May 8, 2016
5	24	October 2, 2016	May 21, 2017
6	21	April 30, 2018	September 17, 2018
7	13	May 23, 2019	August 15, 2019

== Cast and characters ==
=== Main ===
- Jonny Lee Miller as Sherlock Holmes. Holmes is a former Scotland Yard consultant who now lives in New York City after completing drug rehabilitation. He is a deductive genius with a variety of unusual interests and enthusiasms that assist him in his investigations. Feeling that the more interesting criminal cases are in America, he stays in New York. He contacts an old associate, Captain Thomas Gregson of the New York City Police Department (NYPD), to resume his work as a consulting detective. He is forced by his father to live with Dr. Joan Watson, his "sober companion" who provides him with aftercare. Miller's Holmes displays many canonical aspects of Sir Arthur Conan Doyle's character, while his familial relations, most notably his resentment for his father Morland, have been added into his narrative. In between seasons 2 and 3, Sherlock spends eight months in Britain working for MI6 and returns to New York in "Enough Nemesis to Go Around" with a new protégé, Kitty Winter. At the conclusion of season 3, Sherlock suffers a relapse, but his father's connections allow him to resume working for the NYPD. In season 4, Morland reveals that Sherlock's mother, May Holmes, was an opiate addict like him. In the last few episodes of season 5, he is violently assaulted by Shinwell, an aquantance of Joan's, resulting in a severe head injury. He subsequently suffers from severe headaches that affect his concentration and memory, leading to an incident where he is in possession of a severed head, without knowing who the victim was, or if he was the killer, as well as hallucinating about a woman who is based on his mother; the season 6 premiere reveals that he is suffering from post-concussion syndrome, requiring him to be put on a carefully balanced system of medication, as well as taking on assorted mental activities to try and help his brain heal, albeit hampered by Sherlock's 'need' to use his work to escape his past addictions. By the beginning of season 7, Sherlock is officially recovered, although he notes that one more hit to his head could have serious consequences for his health. In the penultimate episode of the series, following his father's murder at the hands of Odin Reichenbach, Sherlock has a showdown with Reichenbach in which he fakes his death, allowing Reichenbach to be arrested and finally convicted of his numerous crimes some time later. In the series finale, after three years in hiding, he returns after his nemesis / former lover Jamie Moriarty lures him out by making a fake threat against Joan's life. He later opts to stay with Joan as she undergoes cancer treatment, and the two partner up again a year later when she recovers. With 24 episodes per season, by the end of season 2, Jonny Lee Miller became the actor who had portrayed Sherlock Holmes the most times in television and/or film, overtaking Jeremy Brett (with 41 television episodes) and Eille Norwood (with 47 silent films).
- Lucy Liu as Dr. Joan Watson (née Yun). Holmes' sober companion, Joan was previously a successful surgeon, which adds to her complement of skills; she had grown close to a patient and his family, and when she accidentally nicked his vena cava during surgery and he bled out in seconds, she gave up her medical career. She comes to Holmes when she is hired by his father as his sober companion, to help him remain abstinent after his release from rehabilitation. After her contracted time is finished, she remains on after lying to Sherlock that his father had continued to retain her services. He gradually comes to value her input and grows to trust her as she helps him come to terms with his life after addiction. Eventually, Sherlock reveals that he found out that Joan is no longer being paid to stay as a companion. He offers her a position as an apprentice, telling her how much she means to him and how she helps him to focus. Joan accepts and starts her training as a detective with Sherlock. After Sherlock leaves for London, Joan becomes the go-to consulting detective for the 11th Precinct, while also taking on more traditional private investigator-type cases that Sherlock eschews. The two resume working together after Sherlock returns to New York, although Joan takes the occasional case independent of Sherlock. Joan has a brother, Oren, and a half-sister, Lin Wen (née Yun). In the final two seasons, Joan starts to take steps to become a mother, and in the series finale, three years after Sherlock fakes his death, she is revealed to have adopted a son named Arthur. During this time, she has also written and published a book recounting her partnership with Sherlock and continued to consult for the NYPD. Near the end of the episode, she reveals that she has cancer and is starting chemotherapy, prompting Sherlock to stay with her through her recovery.
- Aidan Quinn as Captain Thomas "Tommy" Gregson. (Note: Gregson was originally identified as Tobias Gregson in the media, the name used in the original stories. The name Tobias was used briefly in early reviews of the show. The show's writers and CBS media site subsequently confirmed the character's correct name is Thomas.) He heads the 11th Precinct. He was previously assigned to Scotland Yard to observe their Counter-Terrorism Bureau, where he crossed paths with Sherlock and was impressed with his work. He genuinely likes Holmes, and the two have a mutual respect, with Sherlock describing Gregson as an investigator he both respects and admires, though Gregson admits that Sherlock is a "pain in the ass". In season 2, Gregson separates from his wife of over 20 years, Cheryl, and they are divorced by season 3. In "Rip Off" (season 3, episode 5), it is revealed that his daughter, Hannah (Liza J. Bennett), is an ambitious patrol officer with the 15th Precinct; by season 6, Hannah has been promoted to sergeant. In "Absconded" (season 3, episode 23), Gregson is offered a promotion to Deputy Chief due to the outstanding work of his unit, but despite hints that some higher-ups want him to accept the offer, he decides to remain where he is, as he values his current role and ability to interact with people more than the possibilities offered by the promotion. It is also mentioned in that episode that he was put in charge of the Major Case Squad at age 40. In season 4, Gregson begins dating Paige Cowan, a former detective who quit the NYPD after her unit was accused of taking bribes; they briefly break up after Joan runs into them at a restaurant, as Paige claims she does not want people to think ill of Gregson, even if she was not involved in her unit's actions, but Joan soon learns that Paige actually has multiple sclerosis and convinces Gregson to give the relationship another chance; the two later marry. During season 6, when Bell contemplates a transfer to the United States Marshals Service, Gregson observes that Holmes, Watson and Bell make a good partnership because Bell stops them from bending the rules too far when they are conducting investigations. In the beginning of season 7, Gregson is shot and wounded while investigating a cold case, which leads to the revelation of a conspiracy helmed by social media mogul Odin Reichenbach. In the series finale, it is revealed that he retired from the NYPD a year earlier to spend as much time as possible with Paige, who eventually succumbed to her MS.
- Jon Michael Hill as Detective First Grade/Captain Marcus Bell. Bell is a junior officer with the 11th Precinct with whom Sherlock and Joan prefer working. While initially against the idea of getting help from Sherlock, he comes to recognize Sherlock's abilities and readily takes advice from him. Gregson explicitly observes that Bell is a good partner for Sherlock and Joan as he recognizes when circumstances require them to bend the rules (such as by entering properties of suspects without legal warrants) without letting them break anything that would compromise later court cases. He is briefly reassigned to an observational role in season 2 after sustaining a potentially serious shoulder injury at the hands of a hostile witness Sherlock had questioned earlier; this strains his relationship with Sherlock, but a confrontation with Holmes helps Bell overcome the psychological issues that were hindering his recovery and he soon returns to his old role. In season 4, Bell considers taking the sergeant's exam for the increase in pay to help support his ailing mother. In season 6, Bell is offered a position with the United States Marshals Service and decides to put in an application for transfer upon completing his master's degree. However, he later passes up the job after Sherlock takes the blame for the murder of serial killer Michael Rowan to protect both Joan and Gregson's daughter Hannah from prosecution, and then again when Gregson is shot and critically wounded at the start of season 7 to help investigate the conspiracy. In the series finale, Bell is revealed to have married and become a father, and has been promoted to captain of the 11th following Gregson's retirement.
- John Noble as Morland Holmes (season 4; guest: seasons 6-7). Sherlock's much loathed father arrives in New York after Sherlock suffers a relapse at the end of season 3. He works as an influential business consultant, making arrangements for various companies to achieve their goals regardless of what they might be, with Sherlock describing him as a 'neutral' party in that he has no concern about the consequences of his clients' goals so long as they are achieved. He decides to stay in New York for unknown long-term reasons involving Sherlock, with Joan speculating from independent research that he suffered serious stomach damage from a failed murder attempt two years before, and may believe that he is being targeted again. With a view to resolving the threat, at the end of season 4, he accepts the leadership of the imprisoned Moriarty's organization, intending to dismantle the group from within and thereby shield his son and Joan from any further harm. Morland later returns on two separate occasions: once during season 6, following his older son Mycroft's death, when he and Sherlock mend any remaining fences between them, and then again during season 7, where Sherlock recruits his help to bring down Odin Reichenbach. However, after Morland's machinations cripple Reichenbach's company and nearly result in him being ousted, Reichenbach retaliates by having Morland murdered by one of his own associates, setting the stage for a final showdown with Sherlock.
- Nelsan Ellis as Shinwell Johnson (season 5). He is a previous patient of Joan's and an ex-convict and gang member for the SBK (South Bronx Killas). He and Joan become acquainted once more when he is released from prison and placed on probation. During his time on probation, Joan helps him settle back into his life outside of prison while also assisting him in his attempt to build a relationship with his daughter. He was briefly an unofficial informant for an FBI agent and is now an official informant for the Bronx Gang Squad. His relationship with Sherlock and Joan falters when Sherlock discovers that Shinwell was responsible for the death of a friend of his during his original time in the SBK, but Shinwell writes a confession for this crime after beating Sherlock in an alley, as he is preparing to bring down the gang, only to be killed by another member of the SBK. (Eight weeks after his death episode aired, Ellis died in Brooklyn at age 39.)
- Desmond Harrington as Michael Rowan (season 6): A recovering addict who becomes impressed with Sherlock's methods of dealing with his addiction and becomes his friend and leaning post as he tackles his post-concussion syndrome. He is later revealed to be a murderer after burying a woman's body in an unknown location; eventually, he is revealed to be a serial killer, who has killed an estimate of more than a dozen women in multiple states, and has credited Sherlock with convincing him to focus on his "work" (i.e., killing) in order to kick his heroin addiction. When Sherlock's health problems diminish his investigative abilities, Michael leaves New York for a time to allow him to recover. He returns near the end of the season where, after he is revealed to have murdered the addict husband of one of his friends years earlier, he attacks Joan, only to flee after being seriously wounded, and is later found dead; the murder is later revealed to have been committed by Gregson's daughter Hannah as retaliation for Michael's earlier killing of her roommate.
- James Frain as Odin Reichenbach (season 7). The renowned tech mogul hires Sherlock and Joan to find who threatened to kidnap his niece. It is soon learned that he made up the claim as a way to test the two, believing that he had found kindred spirits due to their willingness to go the distance to protect the innocent. It is also revealed that he was indirectly responsible for triggering the events that led to Gregson's shooting at the beginning of the season. Odin later reveals to Sherlock his intention to use his enormous resources, both online and offline, to create a system that prevents future crimes by flushing out the would-be-perpetrators and having them killed before they can carry out any offenses. However, despite Reichenbach clearly wanting to do good, Sherlock feels that his system does not work, citing how he killed a bus driver who was ranting on social media about her plans to kill her passengers; a brief study of the woman's media history confirmed that she had made similar rants in the past at the same time of year and never followed through. While presenting himself as willing to listen to Sherlock's input, Reichenbach soon proves himself extremely ruthless in proving that his system works, to the point of having a target and the target's parents killed in a staged murder-suicide (after Sherlock had averted the threat by convincing the target to take a non-violent approach to his problems), and then later having Sherlock's father Morland murdered after the latter assists his son in crippling Reichenbach's company and nearly getting him ousted. The latter action later results in a showdown between the two, wherein Sherlock fakes his murder at Reichenbach's hands in order to finally see him arrested for his crimes. In the series finale, after a lengthy trial, Reichenbach is finally convicted of numerous murders and other crimes related to his conspiracy, and is sentenced to 148 years in prison.

=== Recurring ===
- Ophelia Lovibond as Kitty Winter. She is Sherlock's newest protégée, whom he brings from London after leaving MI6. She was initially tasked with spying on Watson until being discovered. Sherlock tends to be strict with her but admires her detective skills. Kitty's real name is unknown, as she was kidnapped and raped in London prior to meeting Sherlock and had changed her name in an effort to forget her ordeal. Her character is based on Kitty Winter in Doyle's "The Adventure of the Illustrious Client". After confronting and disfiguring her rapist, she decides to leave the United States to avoid arrest and to go somewhere where she could use the skills that Sherlock and Watson had taught her.
- Ato Essandoh as Alfredo Llamosa. Sherlock's NA sponsor is a recovering addict himself. Alfredo is also a reformed expert car thief. He is now paid by various car companies to test their security systems, and he occasionally lets Sherlock try out his own skills on them. Alfredo is one of Sherlock's few real friends, but does not hesitate to criticize Sherlock when he makes a poor decision and pushes him to continue his rehab regimen, including becoming a sponsor himself. He also teaches Joan how to bypass automotive security. Sherlock later 'fires' Alfredo as his sponsor so that he can help him as a friend.
- Rhys Ifans as Mycroft Holmes. Sherlock's older brother lives in London. He and Sherlock had a very bitter relationship in the past, but Mycroft begins taking steps to reconcile with his brother and becomes good friends with Joan. He owns a chain of restaurants called Diogenes and is an excellent cook. It is later revealed that Mycroft is in the employ of MI6; it becomes necessary for him to fake his death in "The Grand Experiment", an act that his brother feels shows a lack of faith in Sherlock's ability to find another solution. It is revealed in season 6 that Mycroft has died of a brain aneurysm. Sherlock briefly grieves for him when he learns of this, regretting not being able to make up with his brother before his death.
- Natalie Dormer as Irene Adler / Jamie Moriarty. As Irene, she is the great love of Sherlock's life during his life in Britain. She conceals from him that she is also Moriarty, the brilliant criminal mastermind and leader of a shadowy, powerful worldwide criminal organization. She fakes her death to draw his investigations away from her criminal activities. This causes Sherlock's already established drug use to escalate out of control. Despite Sherlock discovering her true identity and engineering her imprisonment, the two continue to have conflicting feelings for each other – Sherlock noting during a conversation with Bell that "the love of [his] life is an unrepentant homicidal maniac" — and great respect for each other's intellectual powers. She orders her organization not to harm him. She also gains a certain amount of respect for Joan, as the latter's ability to fool her is what gets her arrested; when Joan's life is threatened by drug kingpin Elana March, she arranges the criminal's death in her cell. At the end of Season 4, Morland Holmes takes over her organization with the goal of dismantling it. She plays a major unseen role in the series finale, supposedly plotting against Sherlock, only for it to turn out to be a false alarm. Three years later, Sherlock attends her funeral, although he expresses doubt to Watson that Moriarty is actually dead. Series creator Robert Doherty confirmed in an interview that Moriarty is still alive.
- Sean Pertwee as Gareth Lestrade. When Sherlock was based in London, he worked with Lestrade, who was then a member of the Metropolitan Police. Due to Sherlock's insistence on working in anonymity (to avoid generating resentment among his colleagues), Lestrade took credit for solving the cases that they worked on together. Lestrade is clearly not in Sherlock's league, and his overzealousness and impulsiveness tend to impair his judgement; however, he is a skilled detective in his own right.
- Robert Capron as Mason. One of Holmes' irregulars, a young tech genius who is often called upon for his computer hacking skills.
- Candis Cayne as Ms. Hudson. An expert in ancient Greek, she is a kept woman and muse for various wealthy men. Sherlock allows her to stay at the brownstone after a breakup, and she subsequently agrees to clean for them once a week as a source of income. Sherlock initially attempts to make Joan pay for the work, as she complains about his messiness, but she refuses and they settle on sharing the expense. Ms. Hudson is seen in single episodes in each of the first three seasons (episodes 19, 45, 55), and mentioned in numerous others through season 4.
- Betty Gilpin as Fiona "Mittens" Helbron. Helbron is a brilliant software engineer for a technology company called Pentillion, known as 'Mittens' in the hacker community. She is on the autism spectrum, and is a cat lover (hence her hacker moniker). She is briefly considered a suspect in one case (episode 81), but later assists Sherlock and Joan in their investigation. She later contacts Joan for assistance in another matter, and has a romantic relationship with Sherlock for a while (episodes 84 and 90).
- Jordan Gelber as Dr. Eugene Hawes, M.E. Hawes is a New York City medical examiner who provides Sherlock and Joan with details relating to murders. He and Sherlock are regular chess partners ("the first Thursday of the month" is mentioned in the episode "Hounded"). A concealed bomb detonates in the city morgue ("Down Where the Dead Delight"), severely injuring him and killing the woman he is interested in; as a result, he develops a drug addiction. After noticing the indicators, Sherlock implores him to get help ("Hounded"). He takes a leave of absence to recover, but returns to active duty in the season 5 episode "Ill Tidings".
- Tim Guinee as Agent Dean McNally. McNally is an NSA agent who assists Sherlock and Joan when it benefits the NSA, including arranging Mycroft to fake his death in order betray a MI6 mole. Sherlock later approaches McNally in hopes of finding an ally against Odin Reichenbach, but realizes that McNally and the NSA have sided with Reichenbach. In the series conclusion, it's revealed that McNally was promoted after successfully distancing himself from his involvement with Reichenbach and offers Sherlock the NSA's resources in exchange for continuing to fake his death for the rest of his life. Sherlock rejects the offer in order to support Joan after she is diagnosed with cancer.

=== Characters from the Sherlock Holmes stories ===
Elementary often has characters who are loosely based on characters from the original Sherlock Holmes stories by Sir Arthur Conan Doyle.

- Vinnie Jones as Sebastian Moran, also known as "M", Moran is originally thought to be a serial killer who Sherlock believed had murdered Irene Adler. In actuality, he is a former Royal Marine turned hired assassin employed by Jamie Moriarty. In the original Sir Arthur Conan Doyle stories, Moran is an ex-army colonel and the right-hand man of Professor James Moriarty. He is an excellent marksman and carries out assassinations for Moriarty with a specially built silent air rifle that fires revolver bullets, whereas the Moran in Elementary is a brutally psychotic murderer, killing his targets by first hanging them upside down with a homemade tripod device before then slitting their throats. ("M.", "A Landmark Story")
- Freda Foh Shen as Mary Watson. In Elementary, Mary is the mother of Joan Watson, whereas in the Sir Arthur Conan Doyle stories, Mary is the wife of Dr. John Watson. ("The Leviathan", "T-Bone and the Iceman", "Through the Fog")
- David Mogentale as Charles Augustus Milverton. Milverton extorts money from the families of rape victims, which is similar to the character in the Sir Arthur Conan Doyle stories, who is described to Watson by Holmes as "the king of the blackmailers". Both characters are killed in front of Holmes, who breaks into his house in order to destroy his blackmail materials. ("Dead Man's Switch")
- Tim McMullan as DCI Hopkins. Hopkins is a Detective Chief Inspector at New Scotland Yard who brings Sherlock to London to find Gareth Lestrade. In the Sir Arthur Conan Doyle stories, his full name is Stanley Hopkins and he is also a Scotland Yard detective who works with Holmes. ("Step Nine")
- Langdale Pike. Pike is a CCTV observer at Trafalgar Square. In the Sir Arthur Conan Doyle stories, Pike is a celebrated gossipmonger whose columns are published in numerous magazines and newspapers. Both versions of the character are unseen and help Holmes learn the names of people involved in cases. ("Step Nine")
- Stuart Townsend as Adelbert "Del" Gruner. Publicly known as the vice-president of a large insurance company, Gruner hires Watson as an in-house investigator, but is later recognized by Kitty as her rapist. In the Sir Arthur Conan Doyle story The Illustrious Client, Baron Adelbert Gruner is a sadistic rogue suspected of murdering his former wife. ("The Illustrious Client", "The One that Got Away")
- Tom Everett Scott as Henry Baskerville. Depicted as a wealthy businessman who becomes next in line to inherit a substantial trust fund after the murder of his brother Charles. ("Hounded", The Visions of Norman P. Horowitz")
- Tamsin Greig as DCI Athelney Jones. Jones is the Detective Chief Inspector of New Scotland Yard who Holmes and Watson work with when they relocate to London. In the Sir Arthur Conan Doyle stories, Inspector Athelney Jones is a Scotland Yard detective who works with Holmes. ("The Further Adventures")
- Simon Templeman as Ronald Adair. Presenting himself as Jamie Moriarty's attorney and executor of her will after her supposed death, it is later revealed that he was compromised by Agent McNally to lure Sherlock out of hiding. ("Their Last Bow")

== Production ==
=== Development ===
Writer and producer Robert Doherty created the show. Doherty has commented that it was Carl Beverly who "initially was the one who brought up the possibility of developing a Sherlock show." Beverly spoke about the relationship between Sherlock and Watson in the show in July 2012:

Rob [Doherty] often calls it a bromance, but one of the bros just happens to be a woman. He said that from the very beginning and I think it's really an apt description. There's this idea that a man and a woman can't be together on a show especially without needing to be together sexually or in love or whatever, and this is really about the evolution of a friendship and how that happens. Watching that should be as much the story of this show as the mysteries that you see week in and week out about who killed who [sic].

=== Relationship to BBC's Sherlock ===
Sherlock, a contemporary reworking of the Sherlock Holmes story, premiered in the UK in July 2010 and in the U.S. in October 2010. The British show has since sold to more than 200 territories. In January 2012, shortly after CBS's announcement they had ordered the pilot for Elementary, Sherlock producer Sue Vertue told newspaper The Independent, "[W]e understand that CBS are doing their own version of an updated Sherlock Holmes. It's interesting, as they approached us a while back about remaking our show. At the time, they made great assurances about their integrity, so we have to assume that their modernised Sherlock Holmes doesn't resemble ours in any way, as that would be extremely worrying." The following month Vertue said that "We have been in touch with CBS and informed them that we will be looking at their finished pilot very closely for any infringement of our rights."

CBS made a statement on the issue: "Our project is a contemporary take on Sherlock Holmes that will be based on Holmes, Watson and other characters in the public domain, as well as original characters. We are, of course, respectful of all copyright laws and will not infringe on any stories or works that may still be protected."

Creator Robert Doherty discussed comparisons between Sherlock and Elementary the following July, pointing out that a tradition of updated Holmes stories dates back to the Basil Rathbone films of the 1940s, and that he did not think it was the case that Elementary took anything from Sherlock, which he described as a "brilliant show" having watched its first series. Several months later, Lucy Liu confirmed the producers of the UK Sherlock were shown the pilot, "saw how different it was from theirs," and were "okay with it now."

=== Casting ===
Liu was cast by February 2012. That July, she said that Watson is not "someone who's on the sideline; she's his sober companion, she's engaged in him, not the mystery, ... From that point on you get to see how that blossoms out. The foot-in-the-bucket and that kind of Watson happens because in entertainment, there's got to be a sidekick. In this case, that's not the direction we're going in. Ask me in six episodes and if I have a foot in a bucket then we'll have a discussion."

In 2013, it was announced that Rhys Ifans would portray Sherlock's brother, Mycroft Holmes, in the second season premiere. John Noble was cast as Sherlock's father for season 4.

=== Filming ===
Some interior scenes were shot at Silvercup Studios in Long Island City. Some exterior shots of Sherlock's brownstone were filmed in Harlem, which was a stand-in for Brooklyn Heights. Many of the interiors were shot in Queens.

== Reception ==
=== Critical reception ===
The first season was met with positive reviews from critics, who highlighted the show's novel approach to the source material, the writing quality, and the performances and chemistry found between its two leads and supporting cast. Season one holds an 85% approval rating on aggregate review site Rotten Tomatoes, based on 62 reviews, with an average score of 7.69/10. The site's consensus reads: "It may not appeal to purists, but Elementary provides a fresh new spin on Sherlock Holmes, and Jonny Lee Miller shines in the title role." It also holds a Metacritic score of 73 out of 100 based on 29 sampled reviews, indicating "generally favorable reviews". The Guardian's Phelim O'Neill felt that "Jonny Lee Miller and Lucy Liu make it a double act to rival Sherlock" and noted that "the pacing feels perfect and the details are light: viewers can keep up with the investigation and feel involved, not something every investigative show achieves". Lori Rackl of The Chicago Sun-Times gave the pilot episode 3 stars out of 4, and said "While the latest interpretation doesn't live up to the British import, it's still more entertaining than your typical CBS procedural." Hank Stuever of The Washington Post gave it a B+ and felt that the show "exhibits enough stylish wit in its mood and look to quickly distinguish itself from the latest British Sherlock series (seen on PBS)".

Season 2 was met with equally positive reviews. It holds a 100% approval rating on Rotten Tomatoes based on 17 reviews, with an average score of 8.29/10. The site's consensus reads, "With the introduction of Mycroft and Lestrade, Elementary successfully extends into the Sherlock Holmes canon in season two." Several critics praised Rhys Ifans for his portrayal of Mycroft Holmes, with Myles McNutt of The A.V. Club calling his casting choice "inspired" and praising him for being able to match with Miller's "bitterness" and praising the premiere episode overall - he later went on to offer positive words on Ifans' performance in the finale episodes pertaining to Mycroft's story, despite finding flaws in the overall arc. Noel Kirkpatrick of TV.com also praised Ifans, saying he "very finely" played the role. The episode "The Diabolical Kind" also attracted wide acclaim, with many singling out the emotional depth and Natalie Dormer's performance as Moriarty. McNutt called Moriarty's presence in both the episode and the series as a whole "refreshingly dominant" and also praised the storytelling and dialogue, singling out several bits of witty humor in the episode. The episode has a 9.0 rating on TV.com with Kirkpatrick claiming Dormer was "having a ball" playing the role of Moriarty and saying there was "good stuff" to be had in her. Kirkpatrick also appreciated the season as a whole for its development of Holmes' character, as well as the performance of the cast.

Season 3 of Elementary's was also met with a positive critical response. It holds a 100% approval rating on Rotten Tomatoes based on 14 reviews, with an average score of 8.32/10. The site's consensus reads, "Elementary's third season leverages the estrangement between Sherlock and Joan to further explore both characters, proving that Sir Arthur Conan Doyle's creations still have room to grow". IGN praised the evolution of Watson as a character in the show, saying "While other Holmes/Watson incarnations focus on Watson being a friend, medic, and put-upon backup, Elementary has elevated the character into someone with loftier aspirations." Particular praise was given to Ophelia Lovibond for her performance as Sherlock's protege Kitty Winter, with critics feeling she was a welcome addition to the cast. The episode "The One That Got Away" garnered critical acclaim for its resolution of Kitty's story, as well as the performances of Miller and Lovibond. The Season 3 finale was met with positive reviews. IGN's Matt Fowler gave the Season finale: "A Controlled Descent" an 8.3/10 saying that "The one-two punch of Sherlock both giving into his anger and his heroin lust was a scorching way to send us out of Season 3".

Season 4, like previous seasons, was met with a positive critical response. It holds a 100% approval rating on Rotten Tomatoes based on 15 reviews, with an average score of 7.45/10. IGN's Matt Fowler gave the season 4 premiere episode "The Past Is Parent" a 7.3/10. He praised Joan and Sherlock's deepening friendship and John Noble's performance as Sherlock's father, but criticized the fact that the episode did not capitalize on the crisis from the Season 3 finale, saying that "while there wasn't anything necessarily bad about "The Past Is Parent," it just failed to capitalize off the momentum from last season".

Season 5 also holds a 100% approval rating on Rotten Tomatoes based on 6 reviews.

Season 6 also holds a 100% approval rating on Rotten Tomatoes based on 10 reviews.

Season 7 represented a slight dip in ratings by critics, currently standing at 86% based on 14 reviews on Rotten Tomatoes. Australian writer Paul F. Verhoeven regarded the truncated seventh and final season as "[somehow] one of the best" in the show, and considered Elementary to have surpassed Sherlock in quality, noting that "where Cumberbatch’s Sherlock eschewed character development with an almost sociopathic disdain, Elementary revels in the possibilities at hand."

=== Ratings ===
==== Overall ====
Viewership and ratings per season of Elementary
Season	Timeslot (ET)	Episodes	First aired		Last aired		TV season	Viewership rank	Avg. viewers (millions)
Season	Timeslot (ET)	Episodes	Date	Viewers (millions)	Date	Viewers (millions)	TV season	Viewership rank	Avg. viewers (millions)
1	Thursday 10:00 pm	24	September 27, 2012	13.41	May 16, 2013	8.98	2012–13	14	12.65
2	Thursday 10:00 pm	24	September 26, 2013	10.18	May 15, 2014	7.37	2013–14	20	11.74
3	Thursday 10:00 pm	24	October 30, 2014	7.57	May 14, 2015	6.96	2014–15	35	11.12
4	Thursday 10:00 pm (1–16); Sunday 10:00 pm (17–24)	24	November 5, 2015	5.58	May 8, 2016	5.46	2015–16	43	9.14
5	Sunday 10:00 pm	24	October 2, 2016	6.03	May 21, 2017	4.11	2016–17	46	7.42
6	Monday 10:00 pm (Note: The fifteenth episode of the season aired outside of its regular timeslot, on Sunday at 10:30 pm)	21	April 30, 2018	4.74	September 17, 2018	3.10	2017–18	88	5.42
7	Thursday 10:00 pm	13	May 23, 2019	4.08	August 15, 2019	2.82	2018–19	N/A	N/A

==== Season 2 ====
Viewership and ratings per episode of Elementary
No.	Title	Air date	Rating/share (18–49)	Viewers (millions)	DVR (18–49)	DVR viewers (millions)	Total (18–49)	Total viewers (millions)
1	"Step Nine"	September 26, 2013	2.1/6	10.18	1.4	4.91	3.5	15.10
2	"Solve for X"	October 3, 2013	2.0/6	9.38	1.5	4.81	3.5	14.19
3	"We Are Everyone"	October 10, 2013	1.9/6	9.06	1.6	5.01	3.5	14.07
4	"Poison Pen"	October 17, 2013	1.5/4	8.52	1.4	4.43	2.9	12.94
5	"Ancient History"	October 24, 2013	1.8/5	8.72	1.4	4.44	3.2	13.16
6	"An Unnatural Arrangement"	October 31, 2013	1.8/5	9.47	1.3	4.25	3.1	13.73
7	"The Marchioness"	November 7, 2013	1.8/5	8.89	1.4	4.70	3.2	13.59
8	"Blood Is Thicker"	November 14, 2013	1.6/5	8.54	1.5	4.68	3.1	13.23
9	"On the Line"	November 21, 2013	1.8/5	9.24	1.5	4.73	3.3	14.01
10	"Tremors"	December 5, 2013	1.8/5	8.29	1.4	4.84	3.2	13.13
11	"Internal Audit"	December 12, 2013	1.7/5	9.09	1.4	4.67	3.1	13.81
12	"The Diabolical Kind"	January 2, 2014	1.8/5	9.04	1.5	4.96	3.3	13.99
13	"All in the Family"	January 9, 2014	2.0/6	9.97	1.5	4.73	3.5	14.70
14	"Dead Clade Walking"	January 30, 2014	1.9/6	10.34	1.6	5.27	3.5	15.61
15	"Corpse de Ballet"	February 6, 2014	1.8/5	9.45	1.5	4.94	3.3	14.39
16	"The One Percent Solution"	February 27, 2014	1.6/5	8.66	1.5	4.93	3.1	13.59
17	"Ears to You"	March 6, 2014	1.8/5	8.54	1.3	4.65	3.1	13.20
18	"The Hound of the Cancer Cells"	March 13, 2014	1.7/5	8.94	1.2	4.36	2.9	13.39
19	"The Many Mouths of Aaron Colville"	April 3, 2014	1.5/5	7.83	1.3	4.49	2.8	12.32
20	"No Lack of Void"	April 10, 2014	1.6/5	7.90	1.2	4.05	2.8	11.95
21	"The Man with the Twisted Lip"	April 24, 2014	1.6/5	8.13	1.2	4.08	2.8	12.21
22	"Paint It Black"	May 1, 2014	1.6/5	7.79	1.1	3.92	2.7	11.71
23	"Art in the Blood"	May 8, 2014	1.5/4	7.54	1.1	3.89	2.6	11.44
24	"The Grand Experiment"	May 15, 2014	1.4/5	7.37	1.1	3.88	2.5	11.25

==== Season 3 ====
Viewership and ratings per episode of Elementary
No.	Title	Air date	Rating/share (18–49)	Viewers (millions)	DVR (18–49)	DVR viewers (millions)	Total (18–49)	Total viewers (millions)
1	"Enough Nemesis to Go Around"	October 30, 2014	1.2/4	7.57	1.2	4.50	2.4	12.11
2	"The Five Orange Pipz"	November 6, 2014	1.2/4	7.07	1.1	4.25	2.3	11.32
3	"Just a Regular Irregular"	November 13, 2014	1.0/3	6.53	1.1	4.20	2.1	10.73
4	"Bella"	November 20, 2014	1.0/3	6.49	1.1	4.18	2.1	10.66
5	"Rip Off"	November 27, 2014	1.2/4	6.11	1.2	4.25	2.4	10.35
6	"Terra Pericolosa"	December 4, 2014	1.2/6	6.59	—N/a	—N/a	—N/a	—N/a
7	"The Adventure of the Nutmeg Concoction"	December 11, 2014	1.4/4	7.63	1.2	3.93	2.6	11.58
8	"End of Watch"	December 18, 2014	1.3/5	7.57	1.0	3.64	2.3	11.22
9	"The Eternity Injection"	January 8, 2015	1.5/5	8.60	1.2	4.30	2.7	12.90
10	"Seed Money"	January 15, 2015	1.3/4	8.09	1.2	4.35	2.5	12.44
11	"The Illustrious Client"	January 22, 2015	1.5/5	8.28	1.2	4.36	2.7	12.65
12	"The One That Got Away"	January 29, 2015	1.3/4	7.69	1.1	4.13	2.4	11.82
13	"Hemlock"	February 5, 2015	1.5/5	7.87	1.1	4.04	2.6	11.90
14	"The Female of the Species"	February 12, 2015	1.4/5	7.91	1.1	3.90	2.5	11.81
15	"When Your Number's Up"	February 19, 2015	1.5/5	8.21	1.1	4.09	2.6	12.30
16	"For All You Know"	March 5, 2015	1.3/4	7.67	1.1	4.01	2.4	11.69
17	"T-Bone and the Iceman"	March 12, 2015	1.4/5	7.58	1.1	3.97	2.5	11.68
18	"The View From the Olympus"	April 2, 2015	1.2/4	7.48	1.0	3.86	2.2	11.34
19	"One Watson, One Holmes"	April 9, 2015	1.2/4	7.03	1.0	3.76	2.2	10.79
20	"A Stitch in Time"	April 16, 2015	1.4/5	7.56	1.0	3.50	2.4	10.95
21	"Under My Skin"	April 23, 2015	1.3/4	7.56	0.9	3.55	2.2	11.28
22	"The Best Way Out Is Always Through"	April 30, 2015	1.2/4	7.03	0.9	3.37	2.1	10.41
23	"Absconded"	May 7, 2015	1.1/4	6.92	1.0	3.60	2.1	10.52
24	"A Controlled Descent"	May 14, 2015	1.2/4	6.96	0.9	3.53	2.1	10.48

==== Season 4 ====
Viewership and ratings per episode of Elementary
No.	Title	Air date	Rating/share (18–49)	Viewers (millions)	DVR (18–49)	DVR viewers (millions)	Total (18–49)	Total viewers (millions)
1	"The Past Is Parent"	November 5, 2015	1.1/4	5.58	0.9	3.80	2.0	9.38
2	"Evidence of Things Not Seen"	November 12, 2015	0.8/3	5.16	0.9	3.60	1.7	8.78
3	"Tag, You're Me"	November 19, 2015	0.9/3	5.61	0.7	3.18	1.6	8.83
4	"All My Exes Live in Essex"	November 26, 2015	1.0/4	5.32	—N/a	—N/a	—N/a	—N/a
5	"The Games Underfoot"	December 10, 2015	1.0/3	5.00	0.8	3.33	1.8	8.33
6	"The Cost of Doing Business"	December 17, 2015	1.0/4	5.92	0.8	3.54	1.8	9.47
7	"Miss Taken"	January 7, 2016	1.2/4	6.71	1.0	3.93	2.2	10.65
8	"A Burden of Blood"	January 14, 2016	1.1/3	5.98	1.0	3.67	2.1	9.66
9	"Murder Ex Machina"	January 21, 2016	1.1/4	6.33	1.0	3.85	2.1	10.19
10	"Alma Matters"	January 28, 2016	1.1/4	6.09	1.0	3.75	2.1	9.84
11	"Down Where the Dead Delight"	February 4, 2016	1.1/4	6.23	0.9	3.74	2.0	9.97
12	"A View with a Room"	February 11, 2016	1.1/4	6.10	0.9	3.55	2.0	9.65
13	"A Study in Charlotte"	February 18, 2016	1.0/4	5.95	0.9	3.40	1.9	9.34
14	"Who Is That Masked Man?"	February 25, 2016	1.1/4	5.82	0.9	3.73	2.0	9.55
15	"Up to Heaven and Down to Hell"	March 3, 2016	1.1/4	5.85	0.9	3.57	2.0	9.42
16	"Hounded"	March 10, 2016	1.0/4	5.64	0.7	3.28	1.8	8.99
17	"You've Got Me, Who's Got You?"	March 20, 2016	0.8/3	5.28	0.5	2.41	1.3	7.69
18	"Ready or Not"	March 27, 2016	0.8/3	5.16	0.7	3.13	1.5	8.29
19	"All In"	April 10, 2016	0.9/3	6.38	—N/a	—N/a	—N/a	—N/a
20	"Art Imitates Art"	April 10, 2016	0.9/3	6.04	—N/a	2.43	—N/a	8.47
21	"Ain't Nothing Like the Real Thing"	April 17, 2016	0.7/2	5.51	0.7	2.86	1.4	8.38
22	"Turn It Upside Down"	April 24, 2016	0.7/3	5.15	0.8	3.26	1.5	8.41
23	"The Invisible Hand"	May 1, 2016	0.8/3	5.45	0.7	2.95	1.5	8.41
24	"A Difference in Kind"	May 8, 2016	0.7/3	5.46	0.7	3.03	1.4	8.49

==== Season 5 ====
Viewership and ratings per episode of Elementary
No.	Title	Air date	Rating/share (18–49)	Viewers (millions)	DVR (18–49)	DVR viewers (millions)	Total (18–49)	Total viewers (millions)
1	"Folie à Deux"	October 2, 2016	0.8/3	6.03	0.6	2.80	1.4	8.83
2	"Worth Several Cities"	October 16, 2016	0.7/3	5.21	0.6	3.04	1.3	8.25
3	"Render, and Then Seize Her"	October 23, 2016	0.8/3	5.39	—N/a	2.79	—N/a	8.18
4	"Henny Penny, the Sky Is Falling"	October 30, 2016	0.6/2	4.80	0.6	2.94	1.2	7.73
5	"To Catch a Predator Predator"	November 6, 2016	0.6/3	4.68	0.6	2.77	1.2	7.45
6	"Ill Tidings"	November 13, 2016	0.7/2	5.45	0.6	2.66	1.3	8.11
7	"Bang Bang Shoot Chute"	November 20, 2016	0.7/3	5.01	0.6	2.63	1.3	7.64
8	"How the Sausage Is Made"	November 27, 2016	0.7/3	4.95	0.5	2.44	1.2	7.39
9	"It Serves You Right to Suffer"	December 11, 2016	0.6/2	4.73	0.5	2.94	1.1	7.67
10	"Pick Your Poison"	December 18, 2016	0.7/3	5.08	0.6	2.67	1.3	7.75
11	"Be My Guest"	January 8, 2017	0.7/2	5.14	0.6	2.88	1.3	8.02
12	"Crowned Crown, Downtown Brown"	January 15, 2017	0.5/2	4.36	0.6	2.93	1.1	7.29
13	"Over a Barrel"	January 29, 2017	0.7/3	5.44	0.6	2.80	1.3	8.24
14	"Rekt in Real Life"	February 19, 2017	0.7/3	5.08	0.6	2.95	1.3	8.03
15	"Wrong Side of the Road"	March 5, 2017	0.6/2	4.26	—N/a	—N/a	—N/a	—N/a
16	"Fidelity"	March 12, 2017	0.6/2	4.50	0.6	2.81	1.2	7.32
17	"The Ballad of Lady Frances"	March 19, 2017	0.6/2	4.28	0.4	2.20	1.0	6.49
18	"Dead Man's Tale"	March 26, 2017	0.8/3	5.16	—N/a	2.24	—N/a	7.40
19	"High Heat"	April 16, 2017	0.6/2	4.29	0.4	—N/a	1.0	—N/a
20	"The Art of Sleights and Deception"	April 23, 2017	0.5/2	4.47	0.6	2.65	1.1	7.12
21	"Flying into a Rage, Make a Bad Landing"	April 30, 2017	0.5/2	4.79	—N/a	—N/a	—N/a	—N/a
22	"Moving Targets"	May 7, 2017	0.6/2	4.22	0.5	2.60	1.1	6.82
23	"Scrambled"	May 14, 2017	0.6/2	4.43	0.5	2.52	1.1	6.95
24	"Hurt Me, Hurt You"	May 21, 2017	0.5/2	4.11	0.5	2.58	1.0	6.69

==== Season 6 ====
Viewership and ratings per episode of Elementary
No.	Title	Air date	Rating/share (18–49)	Viewers (millions)	DVR (18–49)	DVR viewers (millions)	Total (18–49)	Total viewers (millions)
1	"An Infinite Capacity for Taking Pains"	April 30, 2018	0.6/3	4.74	0.5	2.50	1.1	7.24
2	"Once You've Ruled Out God"	May 7, 2018	0.6/3	4.59	0.4	2.38	1.0	6.97
3	"Pushing Buttons"	May 14, 2018	0.6/3	4.43	0.5	2.44	1.1	6.88
4	"Our Time Is Up"	May 21, 2018	0.5/2	4.17	0.5	2.51	1.0	6.68
5	"Bits and Pieces"	May 28, 2018	0.4/2	3.94	0.5	2.70	0.9	6.64
6	"Give Me the Finger"	June 4, 2018	0.6/3	4.41	0.4	2.63	1.0	7.05
7	"Sober Companions"	June 11, 2018	0.6/3	4.35	0.4	2.37	1.0	6.72
8	"Sand Trap"	June 18, 2018	0.6/3	4.54	0.4	2.46	1.0	7.00
9	"Nobody Lives Forever"	June 25, 2018	0.5/2	3.97	0.5	2.63	1.0	6.60
10	"The Adventure of the Ersatz Sobekneferu"	July 2, 2018	0.4/2	3.89	0.5	2.72	0.9	6.61
11	"You've Come a Long Way, Baby"	July 16, 2018	0.4/2	3.35	0.4	2.40	0.8	5.75
12	"Meet Your Maker"	July 23, 2018	0.4/2	3.45	0.4	2.56	0.8	6.01
13	"Breathe"	July 30, 2018	0.4/2	3.33	0.4	2.37	0.8	5.70
14	"Through the Fog"	August 6, 2018	0.3/2	3.38	0.4	2.51	0.7	5.89
15	"How to Get a Head"	August 12, 2018	0.4/2	3.02	0.4	2.20	0.8	5.22
16	"Uncanny Valley of the Dolls"	August 13, 2018	0.4/2	3.48	0.4	2.47	0.8	5.95
17	"The Worms Crawl In, the Worms Crawl Out"	August 20, 2018	0.4/2	3.34	0.5	2.69	0.9	6.03
18	"The Visions of Norman P. Horowitz"	August 27, 2018	0.5/2	3.57	0.4	2.63	0.9	6.20
19	"The Geek Interpreter"	September 3, 2018	0.5/2	3.30	0.5	2.73	1.0	6.03
20	"Fit to Be Tied"	September 10, 2018	0.4/2	3.17	0.5	2.50	0.9	5.67
21	"Whatever Remains, However Improbable"	September 17, 2018	0.5/2	3.10	0.4	2.48	0.9	5.58

==== Season 7 ====
Viewership and ratings per episode of Elementary
No.	Title	Air date	Rating/share (18–49)	Viewers (millions)	DVR (18–49)	DVR viewers (millions)	Total (18–49)	Total viewers (millions)
1	"The Further Adventures"	May 23, 2019	0.5/3	4.08	0.5	3.02	1.0	7.10
2	"Gutshot"	May 30, 2019	0.5/3	3.78	0.5	2.87	1.0	6.65
3	"The Price of Admission"	June 6, 2019	0.5/3	3.70	0.5	2.74	1.0	6.44
4	"Red Light, Green Light"	June 13, 2019	0.5/2	3.75	0.4	2.75	0.9	6.50
5	"Into the Woods"	June 20, 2019	0.4/3	3.34	0.5	2.67	0.9	6.01
6	"Command: Delete"	June 27, 2019	0.4/2	3.09	0.5	2.82	0.9	5.91
7	"From Russia with Drugs"	July 4, 2019	0.2/2	2.72	0.5	2.46	0.7	5.18
8	"Miss Understood"	July 11, 2019	0.4/2	2.90	0.4	2.58	0.8	5.48
9	"On the Scent"	July 18, 2019	0.4/3	2.81	0.5	2.58	0.9	5.39
10	"The Latest Model"	July 25, 2019	0.3/2	2.63	0.4	2.39	0.8	5.01
11	"Unfriended"	August 1, 2019	0.3/2	2.42	0.4	2.06	0.7	4.48
12	"Reichenbach Falls"	August 8, 2019	0.4/2	2.59	0.4	2.28	0.8	4.87
13	"Their Last Bow"	August 15, 2019	0.4/2	2.82	0.4	2.58	0.8	5.42

=== Awards and nominations ===
Year	Award	Category	Nominee	Result	Ref.
2012	New York Women in Film & TV Muse Award	Actress	Lucy Liu	Won	
2012	People's Choice Awards	Favorite New TV Drama	Elementary	Nominated	
2012	Satellite Awards	Actor in a Television Series Drama	Jonny Lee Miller	Nominated	
2013	ASCAP Film & Television Music Awards	Top Television Series	Sean Callery and Mark Snow	Won	
2013	Edgar Allan Poe Awards	TV Episode Teleplay	Peter Blake ("Child Predator")	Nominated	
2013	Primetime Emmy Awards	Outstanding Main Title Theme Music	Sean Callery	Nominated	
2013	Primetime Emmy Awards	Outstanding Main Title Design	Simon Clowes, Benji Bakshi, Kyle Cooper, Nate Park and Ryan Robertson	Nominated	
2013	Prism Awards	Drama Series Multi-Episode Storyline – Substance Use	Craig Sweeny, Robert Doherty, Sarah Timberman, Carl Beverly, Robert Doherty, Peter Blake, Craig Sweeny, Liz Friedman, Corinne Brinkerhoff, Christopher Silber, Jeffrey Paul King, Michael Cuesta, John David Coles, Rod Holcomb, Rosemary Rodriguez, Colin Bucksey, David Platt, Seith Mann, Andrew Bernstein and Phil Abraham	Nominated	
2013	Prism Awards	Female Performance in a Drama Series Multi-Episode	Lucy Liu	Nominated	
2013	Prism Awards	EIC President's Award	Elementary	Won	
2013	Saturn Award	Best Network Television Series	Elementary	Nominated	
2013	Seoul International Drama Awards	Best Actress	Lucy Liu	Won	
2013	Teen Choice Awards	Choice TV Actress: Action	Lucy Liu	Won	
2013	Television Critics Association Awards	Outstanding New Program	Elementary	Nominated	
2013	TV Guide Awards	Favorite New Series	Elementary	Nominated	
2014	GLAAD Media Awards	Outstanding Individual Episode (in a Series without a Regular LGBT Character)	Andrew Bernstein and Jason Tracey ("Snow Angels")	Won	
2014	Prism Awards	Drama Series Multi-Episode Storyline – Substance Use	Sherlock's Recovery	Nominated	
2015	People's Choice Awards	Favorite TV Crime Drama Actress	Lucy Liu	Nominated	
2015	Prism Awards	Drama Series Multi-Episode Storyline – Substance Use	"No Lack of Void" / "End of Watch"	Won	
2015	Prism Awards	Drama Episode – Mental Health	Jean de Segonzac and Liz Friedman ("Corpse de Ballet")	Nominated	
2015	Voice Awards	Television	Elementary	Won	
2016	People's Choice Awards	Favorite TV Crime Drama Actress	Lucy Liu	Nominated	
2016	World Soundtrack Academy	Television Composer of the Year	Sean Callery	Nominated	
2017	People's Choice Awards	Favorite TV Crime Drama Actress	Lucy Liu	Nominated	

== Broadcast and syndication ==
In the United States, reruns of Elementary aired on Start TV since January 1, 2024.

In Australia, Elementary premiered on Network Ten on February 3, 2013. The second season started airing on March 23, 2014. The third season started airing on March 2, 2015.

In Canada, it airs simultaneously on Global. In New Zealand, it premiered on Prime on February 27, 2013.

In the United Kingdom and Ireland, the series was acquired by Sky Witness (previously Sky Living), a subscription channel. It debuted on October 23, 2012. The second season premiered on October 22, 2013. The third season began airing on November 11, 2014. Season 1 premiered on free-to-air TV in the UK on Sky-owned channel Pick on February 6, 2017.

On February 3, 2013, Elementary was broadcast after Super Bowl XLVII as the official lead-out program. The episode drew 20.8 million viewers, despite running out of prime time in the Eastern time zone as a result of a game delay.

As of 2025, the series is available on Amazon Prime Video and Hulu.

== Tie-in media ==
In February 2015, Titan Books published the first official tie-in novel, The Ghost Line (ISBN 9781781169841), written by Adam Christopher. A second novel, also written by Adam Christopher and titled Blood and Ink, was published on April 26, 2016 (ISBN 9781785650277).

== See also ==
- The Return of Sherlock Holmes – a 1987 television film featuring Holmes in a contemporary setting and a Jane Watson, also produced by CBS
- 1994 Baker Street: Sherlock Holmes Returns – a 1993 television film featuring Holmes in a contemporary setting, also produced by CBS
- Watson – a TV series featuring Dr. Watson in a contemporary setting, also produced by CBS and featuring some of the same creative team from Elementary
