= Antenna Awards =

Australian awards given for excellence in community television production

Coordinates: 37.817798°S 144.968714°E

- Current: 2021 Antenna Awards
- Awarded for: Excellence in community television production
- Country: Australia
- First award: 2004; 22 years ago
- Website: c31.org.au/antennas

Television/radio coverage
- Network: C31 Melbourne (2004–2010; 2014; 2019; 2021; 2023–present)

The Antenna Awards is an Australian awards ceremony which recognises outstanding achievements in community television production. First held in 2004, the ceremony is produced by C31 Melbourne, and is broadcast by terrestrial community television stations (colloquially known as Channel 31) across Australia.

Nominations are accepted from producers, presenters and other volunteers within the sector for programming produced within the eligibility period of each ceremony. Entries are judged entirely by a panel decided by the event organisers; previously, the Viewers' Choice Award allowed for Channel 31 viewers to nominate their favourite programs in a given year.

Between 2004 and 2010 the awards were held annually – first at RMIT University's Storey Hall, and later at the Deakin Edge at Federation Square. In 2014, the awards were revived to honour 20 years of community television in Brisbane and Melbourne, and were held again in 2019 to honour 25 years of C31 Melbourne.

== Original run ==
=== 2005 ===
- Best Comedy Program – The Shambles, Nathan Valvo & Sean Lynch
- Best Drama Program – The Video Store, Sam Barrett & Adrian Mcfarlane
- Best Arts Program – Gallery Watch, Tibor Meszaros
- Best Music Program – Turkish Star Australia, Ses Promotions
- Best Variety Program – Get Up Tucked, Ricarp Productions
- Best News/Current Affairs Program – The Sauce, Alison Murphy & Natasha Duckett
- Best Interview Program – Ro Tv, Curtin University & Rotary Wa
- Best Sports Program – The Hockey Show, Dan Miles & Hugh Jellie
- Best Panel Program – No Limits, Sarah Barton
- Best Live / Outside Broadcast Program – Carols in the Park, Dean Gray & Peter Wood (Videoworks)
- Best Indigenous Program – Beyond Their Limits, Paul Deeming & Chris Bayley
- Best Children's Program – Hello Music, Karen Kim
- Best Youth Program – Teenwire, Simon Hydzik & Glenn Clarke
- Best Living & Learning Program – End To End – Lawn Bowls in Wa, Allan Blair & Simon Hydzik
- Best Culturally & Linguistically Diverse Program – Salam Café, Ahmed Hassan
- Best Faith Based & Spiritual Development Program – Salam Café, Ahmed Hassan
- Best Sound – Plug-In, Simon Moule & Salvador Castro
- Best Camerawork – Citylife, Anthony Abicair
- Best Editing – Plug-In, Simon Moule & Salvador Castro
- Best Music Composition – The C Word "31 Song", Nicky Bomba
- Best Director – The Shambles, Nathan Valvo, Sean Lynch & Anthony Ziella
- Best Program Id/Main Title/Promo – The Sauce (Promo), Alison Murphy & Natasha Duckett
- Best Sponsorship Announcement – Acland St Traders Association, Graham C Irwin
- Best Program That Supports Local Metropolitan Communities – Get Up Tucked, Ricarp Productions
- Best Program That Supports Local Rural And Regional Communities – Exmouth on Show, Anita Krsnik & Michael Zampogna
- Best New Producer – Simon Christie & Miranda Christie, 4wd Tv
- Best Female Presenter – Krystal Manson, This Town Brisbane
- Best Male Presenter – Dieter Kahsnitz, The C Word
- Viewer's Choice Award – 4wd Tv, Simon Christie & Miranda Christie
- Producer of the Year – Campbell Manderson, Debra Weddall & Jacinta Hicken, The Activist Awards
- Program of the Year – No Limits, Sarah Barton

=== 2006 ===
- Best Comedy Program – The Ugly Stick
- Best Drama Program – Yartz
- Best Arts Program – Masterclass in Oils
- Best Music Program – On the Couch
- Best Variety Program – Teenwire
- Best News/Current Affairs Program – QUT News
- Best Interview Program – C-Word
- Best Sports Program – Wake Life
- Best Panel Program – No Limits
- Best Live or Outside Broadcast Program – Science in the Pub
- Best Indigenous Program – Bobtales
- Best Children's Program – Jelly Jym
- Best Youth Program – Class TV
- Best Living and Learning Program – The Garden Tap
- Best Culturally and Linguistically Diverse Program – Fusion Latina
- Best Personal and/or Spiritual Development Program – Tickets Passport and Tarot
- Best Sound – The Launch
- Best Camerawork – Michael Rachelle – Sk82death
- Best Editing – Simon Hydzik – Teenwise
- Best Music Composition – Ugly Stick
- Best Director – Mat Jones – Public Holiday
- Best Program ID/Main Title/Promo – 123 TV
- Best Sponsorship Announcement – Ugly Stick � Crumpler Bag
- Best Program that Supports Local Metropolitan Communities – Local Knowledge
- Best Program that Supports Rural and Regional Communities – Northam Back to Future
- Best New Producer – Lyn Vickery & Rob Solomon – Wake Up Perth
- Best Female Presenter – On the Couch – Steph Rogers
- Best Male Presenter – C-Word – Dieter Kahsntiz
- Producer of the Year – Don Miles & Hugh Jellie – Hockey Show
- Program of the Year – Salam Café

=== 2007 ===
* Best Living and Learning Program : No Limits

- Best Program that Supports New and Emerging Communities: Salam Café
- Best Comedy: In Wollongong Tonight
- Best Young Persons program: sk82death
- Best Indigenous program: Bobtales
- Best Arts: Rock and Roll Cooking Show
- Best Program that Promotes Community Harmony & Diversity: No Limits
- Best Drama: One Night Stand
- Best Music Composition: More Amore
- Best Music program: Rock and Roll Cooking Show
- Best Female presenter: Vanity Pets
- Best Male presenter: Vasili's Garden (Vasili Kanidiadis)
- Best Live or outside broadcast: Barnaby Flowers
- Best Sports: sk82death
- Best News or Current Affairs: The C News Focus Special
- Best CALD program: Salam Cafe
- Best Camerawork: sk82death
- Best Editing: The Ugly Stick
- Best Director: The Ugly Stick
- Best Producer: Kids Life
- Best Sound: Rock and Roll Cooking Show
- Outstanding Production Achievement: Geraldton on Show
- Program of the Year: Signpost
- Outstanding Contribution to Community Television: Andrew Brine
- Viewers' Choice Award: 4WD TV

=== 2008 ===
The 2008 awards ceremony were held at the BMW Edge theatre, Federation Square on Thursday, 24 April, and broadcast on Sunday, 27 April at 7.30 pm.

- Best Indigenous Program – Noongar Dundjoo
  - Nominees: Totally School, Nunga Lounge, Urban Chesspieces, The Marngrook Footy Show
- Best News or Current Affair Program – Wake Up! WA
  - Nominees: Tea Tree Gully TV Naturally Better, SKA Story, State Question Time, The Union Show
- Best Camera Work – The Goin' Ballistyx Snowboard Show
  - Nominees: Let's Go Birdwatching, Making the Switch, Gasolene, Mystical Guides Haunted Australia
- Best Editing – Making the Switch
  - Nominees: The Bazura Project, Living on the Coast, Flicktease
- Best Program that supports New and Emerging Communities – Sri Lanka Morning Show
  - Nominees: Talent Pool, SKA Story, VNTV, Pinoy TV
- Best Music Program – Asylum
  - Nominees: T Sessions, Pinoy Music Lounge, Songwriters Across Australia, Access All Areas TV
- Best Theme Music Composition – Penguin TV
  - Nominees: Play Kool, Room to Grow, Wake Life, No Limits
- Best Young Persons Program – Class TV
  - Nominees: Fusion Latina, Totally School, Hit TV, Minnie Monkey
- Best Live or Outside Broadcast – The Breakfast Show
  - Nominees: WAFL ON, No Limits, Viva Melbourne, Wake Up! WA
- Best Lifestyle Program – Making The Switch
  - Nominees: Let's Go Bird Watching, Kids Life, Living on the Coast, Latin Dance Alive
- Best Comedy Program – The Bazura Project
  - Nominees: Planet Nerd, Barnaby Flowers Bumper Bonanza, twentysomething
- Best Interview Show – Ngulla Pt 1 and 2
  - Nominees: The MS Show, The Shtick, Adelaide Vibe, A Life in Crime
- Best Sound – The Gascoyne Dash
  - Nominees: The Bazura Project, The Union Show, Barnaby Flowers, Mystical Guides
- Best Sports Program – The Marngrook Footy Show
  - Nominees: ALHL Ice Hockey, The Hockey Show, Ten Pin Bowling, On the Water
- Best Special Presentation – Making Monsters
  - Nominees: The Gascoyne Dash, Mystical Guides, The Marngrook Footy Show Grand Final Show, The Union Show
- Best Arts Program – The Bazura Project
  - Nominees: The Green Room, Blurb, Painting with John, Popcorn
- Best CALD Program – ** Sign Post
  - Viva Melbourne, Hello Australia, Fusion Latina, Sri Lanka Morning Show
- Best Female Presenter – Emma Race (The Breakfast Show)
  - Nominees: Mahlia Simpson (Kids Life), Jodie Raquel (The Italian Guide), Natasha Ferre (The Goin Ballistyx Snowboarding Show), Yvonne Goldsmith (Latin Dance Alive)
- Best Male Presenter – Michael Kuzilny (A Life in Crime)
  - Nominees: Phil Cleary (The Union Show), Charlie Barilla (Charlie's Kitchen), Nick Ball (The Hockey Show), Todd Wright (Sign Post)
- Best Director – Lee Zachariah (The Bazura Project)
  - Nominees: Mystical Guides, Jess Harris & Josh Schmidt (twentysomething), Sylvi Soeharjono (Latin Dance Alive), Peter Weatherall (Penguin TV)
- Producer of the Year – Emma Race (The Breakfast Show)
  - Nominees: Tim Egan (The Bazura Project), Michael Curson (Gasolene), Global Vision Media (Making the Switch), Jess Harris (twentysomething)
- Best Program – Making the Switch
  - Nominees: The MS Show, The Goin' Ballistyx Snow Boarding Show, Let's Go Bird Watching, Play Kool
- Outstanding Contribution to Community Television – Josie Parrelli
- Viewers' Choice Award – 4WD TV

=== 2009 ===
- Outstanding Arts Program – The Bazura Project
- Outstanding Comedy Program – Talking Comics With Gazz & Dazz
- Outstanding Development Program – The Red Room
- Outstanding Female Presenter – Kat Bergin; Theatregames Live
- Outstanding Interview Program – No Limits
- Outstanding Lifestyle Program – Vasili's Garden
- Outstanding Male Presenter – Steve Hurd - No Limits
- Outstanding Music Program – Scout Tv
- Outstanding News Program – The Union Show
- Outstanding Special Presentation/One Off Program – ATVAA; Racing with the Seadragons
- Outstanding Cald Program – Fusion Latina
- Outstanding Cald Producer: Milano Livera – Fusion Latina
- Outstanding Exterior Broadcast Program – Studio A
- Outstanding Program of the Year – Studio A
- Outstanding Recreational Program – On The Water
- Outstanding Sports Program – The Surfers Life
- Outstanding Technical Excellence – Living on the Coast
- Outstanding Contribution Community Tv Program – David Mclaughlin
- Outstanding Theme Music – Brain Date
- Outstanding Youth Program – 1700

=== 2010 ===
In 2010, C31 Melbourne Antenna Awards were held on Sunday 27 June at BMW Edge from Federation Square, Melbourne.

- Program of the Year - Dare I Ask?
- Outstanding Achievement in Technical Innovation – The Mutant Way
- Outstanding Arts Program - Fusion Latina
- Outstanding Comedy Program – The Mutant Way
- Outstanding Culturally And Linguistically Diverse Program - The Pinoy Lounge
- Outstanding Factual, Current Affairs Or Interview Program – Dare I Ask?
- Outstanding Female Presenter - Jackie Doran: The Naughty Rude Show
- Outstanding Male Presenter – Mitch Mctaggart: Socially Inadequate
- Outstanding Information Or Lifestyle Program - Horse Talk Tv
- Outstanding Live Or Outside Broadcast Program – The Inquiry
- Outstanding Music Program – Asylum Tv
- Outstanding Original Theme Music Composition – Dancing About Architecture – Ben Birchall And Dave Mcgann
- Outstanding Outdoor Recreational Program - Hound Tv
- Outstanding Sports Program - The Local Footy Show
- Outstanding Young Persons Program – The Naughty Rude Show

== Revivals ==
On 1 July 2014, C31 Melbourne announced the return of the Antenna Awards for 2014, to mark 20 years since the first broadcasts of C31 Melbourne and 31 Digital Brisbane. Following the success of a Pozible crowdfunding campaign, the 2014 Antenna Awards were held on 1 October 2014 at the Deakin Edge at Federation Square in Melbourne, with 13 Antennas awarded.

On 4 July 2019, C31 Melbourne announced a second revival of the Antenna Awards, marking 25 years since the channel's first broadcast. The 2019 Antenna Awards were held on 5 October 2019, with 24 Antennas awarded.

On 1 February 2021, C31 Melbourne announced a third revival of the Antenna Awards. The 2021 Antenna Awards will be held on 19 June 2021, instead of 29 May 2021, and will mark the 10th time the awards have been held since their inception in 2004.

On 28 October 2023, the 2023 Antenna Awards will be held at Deakin Edge in Melbourne.

On 15 November 2025, the 2025 Antenna Awards will be held at Cathedral Hall in Fitzroy.

== Awards ==
As of the 2019 Antenna Awards, awards are given in 23 categories:

- Outstanding Direction in a Program
- Outstanding Sound in a Program
- Outstanding Editing in a Program
- Outstanding Camera Work in a Program
- Outstanding Theme Song in a Program
- Best Comedy Program
- Best Music Program
- Best Factual, Current Affairs or Interview Program
- Best Culturally and/or Linguistically Diverse Program
- Best Special Interest or Lifestyle Program
- Best Sports Program
- Best Outdoor or Recreational Program
- Best Youth Program
- Best Live and/or Outside Broadcast
- Best Narrative and/or Fictional Program
- Best Actor in a Narrative Drama, Comedy or Sketch
- Best Journalism in a Program
- Best Culturally and/or Linguistically Diverse Personality
- Youth Personality of the Year
- Personality of the Year
- Outstanding Creative Achievement in a Program
- Outstanding Contribution to Community by a Program
- Program of the Year

== See also ==
- List of television awards
