= Rob Lloyd (comedian) =

Australian actor and comedian (born 1978)

- Born: 3 April 1978 (age 48)
- Occupations: Television presenter Comedian; Producer; Writer
- Known for: The Science of Doctor Who Australian tour (2014); Who, Me (2011–present) stage show Live on Bowen (2012–2013) TV variety show The Mutant Way (2009) comedy and improvisation TV show Planet Nerd (2007) Geek sitcom
- Website: www.roblloyd.com.au

Robert "Rob" Lloyd (born 3 April 1978) is an Australian actor and comedian who was the host of the RMITV flagship program Live on Bowen for the first two seasons. He was the host, co-writer and producer of The Mutant Way, which won several 2010 Antenna Awards. Rob also has a Doctor Who themed stage show called Who, Me that has had sell-out seasons at the 2011 Melbourne Fringe Festival, the 2011 Armageddon convention (Melbourne), the 2012 Adelaide Fringe Festival, and the 2012 Melbourne International Comedy Festival. In 2013 Lloyd toured Who, Me to Edinburgh Fringe Festival. In 2014 Lloyd teamed up with the Royal Institution of Australia in association with BBC Worldwide Australia/New Zealand to host The Science of Doctor Who which toured nationally during April, May and June.
