= Making Monsters =

Making Monsters may mean:

- Making Monsters (TV series), a 2010s American TV series
- Making Monsters (album), a 2010 album by Combichrist
- Making Monsters: False Memories, Psychotherapy, and Sexual Hysteria, a 1994 book by Richard Ofshe and Ethan Watters
- "Making Monsters" (song), a song by Five Finger Death Punch on their 2020 album F8

== See also ==
- The Making of Monsters, a 1991 Canadian short film
