= Salam Cafe =

Australian comedy talk TV series

- Salam Cafe, Episode 10, 2008
- Genre: Comedy, talk show
- Directed by: Martin Coombes; Ramzi Nabulsi
- Presented by: Ahmed Imam
- Starring: Waleed Aly; Susan Carland; Ahmed Hassan; Nazeem Hussain; Dakhylina Madkhul; Toltu Tufa
- Country of origin: Australia
- Original language: English
- No. of episodes: 60

Production
- Producers: Ted Robinson; Pamela Swain; Ade Djajamihardja; Verity Edris-Peterson; Jehad Dabab

Original release
- Network: Channel 31
- Release: April 2005
- Network: SBS TV
- Release: May 7, 2008 – July 2008

Salam Cafe is an Australian comedy talk show. Produced by RMITV, and originally airing on Channel 31 from April 2005 under the title Ramadan TV, the show began a revamped ten-week run on the SBS from 7 May 2008. Hosted by Ahmed Imam and starring various Muslim panellists, including Waleed Aly and Susan Carland, the show presents a light hearted, humorous view on life as a Muslim in Australia through panel discussion and a series of sketches that lampoon the representation of Muslims in Australia and the Islamic way of life.

The show was filmed in front of a live audience in Sydney and Melbourne.

== Awards ==
Salam Cafe has won various Antenna Awards, recognising outstanding community television programs broadcast on Channel 31 across Australia.

Year	Award
2005	Best Culturally and Linguistically Diverse Program
2005	Best Faith Based and Spiritual Development Program
2006	Program of the Year
2007	Best Program that Supports New and Emerging Communities
