= Who, Me =

- Original language: English
- Written by: Rob LLoyd & Scott Gooding

Premiere
- Date: 23 September 2011
- Place: North Melbourne Town Hall
- Official website

Who, Me is a Doctor Who themed stage show directed and co-devised by Scott Gooding, starring comedian Rob Lloyd and produced by Laura Milke Garner. Lloyd uses a fake courtroom setting to analyse whether Doctor Who has made him an obsessive or a better person, with stories and photos from his childhood.

In 2013 the show was toured to Edinburgh Festival Fringe.

== Critical reaction ==
Simon Wong for 3 News in New Zealand considered it was still enjoyable even for non Who fans, though they might miss a few jokes. Edinburgh Reviews gave it 3/5, finding it felt a bit rushed and had problems adjusting for the audience, comprising both children and adults, saying that the show was more personal history than something for fans of the TV program. The Skinny gave the Edinburgh production 4/5, finding Lloyd "funny" and "endearing". Three Weeks found the same production fast-paced even if some jokes would go over people's heads. What's On Comedy, reviewing the production at the Seymour Centre in Sydney, noted Lloyd's resemblance to both David Tennant and Matt Smith, and said it would probably appeal to theatre nerds as much as Doctor Who nerds, or indeed to nerds of any sort.

== Sell-Out Seasons ==
- The 2011 Melbourne Fringe Festival
- The 2011 Armageddon Cultural Expo Melbourne
- The 2012 Adelaide Fringe Festival
- The 2012 Melbourne International Comedy Festival
- Whovention, Sydney (Dr Who Club of Australia) - 2013
- The Darwin Entertainment Centre - 2013
- Lords of Time, Melbourne (First Contact Conventions) - 2013
- The 2013 Sydney Comedy Festival
- The 2013 Auckland Comedy Festival
- The 2013 Perth International Comedy Festival
- The Adelaide Comedy Circuit - 2013
- A special season at The CSIRO: Discovery Centre. Canberra - 2013
- The 2013 EDINBURGH FRINGE FESTIVAL.
- The 2013 Melbourne City Library Doctor Who Festival
- The 2014 Perth Fringe World Festival
- The 2014 Chicago Fringe Festival

== Reviews ==
"It was a really great show to watch"
