= Steam Punks! =

- Genre: Children's game show
- Presented by: Paul Verhoeven
- Country of origin: Australia
- Original language: English
- No. of series: 1
- No. of episodes: 40

Production
- Running time: 30 minutes
- Production company: Beyond Productions

Original release
- Network: ABC Me
- Release: 17 February 2013 – 9 February 2014

Steam Punks! is an Australian children's steampunk-themed game show which premiered on ABC Me on 17 February 2013.

== Format ==
The show centres around two teams of two people known as 'Inquisitives' who are set a variety of challenges by an evil genius known as The Machine. The inquisitor, played by Paul Verhoeven, assists teams in completing these challenges.

Each episode includes five rounds with five different challenges. These include segments include:

=== The Quizatorium ===
Each team must answer multiple choice questions based on scientific general knowledge.

=== The Storeroom ===
Teams will encounter five different storerooms which test each of their five senses. In order to win this round, the team which endures each physical test before the other team can complete them.

=== Bang, Crash, Splat, Splash ===
During this round, teams will have to predict the outcome of some experiments. The team who successfully predicts the outcome wins this round.

=== Feed the Furnace ===
For this round, one member of each team must hurl coal into the furnace to feed The Machine whilst the other team sprays them with pungent goo. Whichever team hurls the most coal in wins this round.

=== Fast or Last ===
For the final round, teams must quickly answer science themed questions. In order to give their answer, they must use their hammer to hit their buzzer before the other team can. If someone answers incorrectly, the other team will have a go at answering before proceeding to the next question.

The team that wins the most challenges will be dubbed 'Steampunks' whilst the team that loses is banished to the catacombs to serve The Machine.
