= The Mutant Way =

- Genre: Entertainment, Comedy/Improvisation
- Created by: Darcy Bonser & Lisa Sloetjes
- Developed by: DeakinTV
- Directed by: Jared Kettle
- Presented by: Rob Lloyd
- Theme music composer: Jay Cooper and Dane-Michael Starwood
- Country of origin: Australia
- Original language: English
- No. of seasons: 1
- No. of episodes: 14

Production
- Production locations: Melbourne, Victoria
- Editor: Darcy Bonser
- Running time: 30 minutes including sponsorship announcements

Original release
- Network: C31 Melbourne
- Release: 8 June 2009 – present

The Mutant Way is a comedy panel program aired on Channel 31 Melbourne and produced by Deakin TV. The show featured two panels competing against each other in a series of comedic challenges.

Each week, the panels consisted of regular weekly panelists (improvisers), joined by two special guests. In 2010, The Mutant Way won two Antenna Awards; one for 'Outstanding Comedy Program' and another for 'Outstanding Excellence in Technical Innovation'.

== Cast ==
| Presenter | Role | Tenure |
|---|---|---|
| Rob Lloyd | Host | 2009 |
| Rik Brown | Regular Panelist | 2009 |
| Lliam Amor | Regular Panelist | 2009 |
| Rama Nicholas | Regular Panelist | 2009 |
| Mark Gambino | Regular Panelist | 2009 |
| Nigel Walton | Regular Panelist | 2009 |
| Patti Stiles | Regular Panelist | 2009 |
| Petra Elliot | Regular Panelist | 2009 |
| Marty Fields | Guest Panelist | 2009 |
