= Child Genius (Australian TV series) =

2018 Australian reality TV series

- Genre: Reality
- Developed by: Warner Bros
- Presented by: Susan Carland
- Country of origin: Australia
- Original language: English
- No. of seasons: 2
- No. of episodes: 12

Production
- Production locations: Sydney, New South Wales
- Running time: 60 minutes

Original release
- Network: SBS
- Release: 12 November 2018

Related
- Child Genius UK; Child Genius US

Child Genius is an Australian reality competition series, hosted by Susan Carland and broadcast on SBS. The show involves a group of gifted children completing a series of tasks to gain the title of child genius. Gifted consultant and Chairman of Mensa International's Gifted Youth Committee Alan D. Thompson appeared for Australian Mensa.

== Seasons overview ==
=== Season 1 Contestant Demographics ===
The first season featured 19 participants ranging in age from seven to 12 years old.

=== Winner of Season 1 ===
Nathan, a 12-year-old from Brisbane, was the winner of the first season of Child Genius Australia.

=== Season 2 Format Changes ===
Season 2 was reduced from six episodes to four and increased the focus on the parents' stories. It featured 16 children aged eight to 12.

== Production Company ==
The series is produced specifically by Warner Bros. International Television Production Australia.
