= Paul Verhoeven (broadcaster) =

Australian broadcaster

- Born: 15 January 1983 (age 43); Sydney, New South Wales, Australia
- Occupations: Television and radio presenter, comedian, writer
- Spouse: Tegan Higginbotham

Paul F. Verhoeven (born 15 January 1983) is an Australian television and radio presenter, writer, blogger and comedian. He is the host of the television program Steam Punks! on the ABC Entertains channel.

== Early life ==
Verhoeven's father, John Verhoeven, was an officer in the New South Wales Police Force. Verhoeven grew up with his family on Sydney's northern beaches, before he moved to Melbourne after completing a Bachelor of Film Studies at the University of New South Wales.

== Radio ==
Verhoeven is best known for his extensive work with Triple J as the host of the "Nerdy By Nature" segment on The Breakfast Show with Tom Ballard and Alex Dyson. The segment was formerly known as "Nerds of a Feather" and "Close Encounters of the Nerd Kind".

He presented The Mid-Dawn show for four years and was producer of The Graveyard Shift with Dave Callan. Verhoeven has also presented The Breakfast Show, Weekend Arvos and Triple J's Weekend Breakfast Show.

He is currently a regular fill-in presenter on ABC Radio Melbourne and ABC Local Radio programs.

== Television ==
Verhoeven is the host and co-writer of Steam Punks, a narrative game show on ABC 3, produced by Beyond Entertainment. He has been a regular guest on Channel 10's The Project and Studio 3 on ABC 3. He has also appeared on Good Game. He makes regular appearances on the Melbourne community TV station Channel 31. He was a presenter on two seasons of Save Point, a gaming show on ONE HD, which began its second season in 2012.

Verhoeven co-hosted and wrote for the Planet Nerd, a geek comedy RMITV program broadcast on Channel 31 Melbourne, which was nominated for Best Comedy Program at the 2008 Antenna Awards. He wrote and presented an online television series entitled Curiageous, a comedic mythbusting series, for the Australian online news site The Vine.

== Comedy ==
Verhoeven made his solo comedy debut in the show Tell Me Lies at the 2014 Melbourne Fringe Festival. He reprised it at the 2015 Melbourne International Comedy Festival, where The Sydney Morning Herald awarded it four stars and called it "an engaging night of comedy, from a very enjoyable performer who left the audience wanting more". He also performed in the 2014 Melbourne Fringe Festival production of Watson: Who's Afraid of the Dark, which won a Fringe Award for best comedy that year.

== Online and other work ==
Verhoeven is a long-running senior contributor to The Vine. He is also writer and artist of Lessons for Children, a weekly syndicated web comic. He has been a regular contributor for Yen Magazine, a pop culture critic for Junkee, a game critic for MMGN and has written for Filmink magazine, Triple J Magazine and Horse and Hound. In March 2015, together with artist and comedian Kris Straub, he created the ongoing gaming podcast 28 Plays Later, which he co-hosts.

Verhoeven has a YouTube channel with a focus on the BBC sci-fi drama Doctor Who, giving opinions, reviews and speculation, as well as branching into discussion on other topics such as equality in video games and dog impressions. His TEDx talk, entitled "Sexism in Gaming", received attention in early 2014.

Verhoeven's true crime book, Loose Units, was released in 2018. The book includes tales from his father, John Verhoeven's, career experiences (including in the New South Wales Police Force) as well as other people's careers. A companion crime podcast (2018–present) which includes conversations with his father. Another book, Electric Blue, was released in 2020.

== Personal life ==
Verhoeven was one of Cleo magazine's Top 50 Bachelors of the Year for 2011 and was named the second runner up. He married Tegan Higginbotham in a civil ceremony in Paris in July 2019.
