= Planet Nerd =

- Created by: Dan Walmsley
- Developed by: Dan Walmsley and the cast
- Starring: Dan Walmsley, Paul Verhoeven, Ben McKenzie, Simon Barber, Jason English-Rees, Andrew Doodson, Lou Pardi, Rob Lloyd and others
- Country of origin: Australia
- No. of episodes: 12

Production
- Running time: 24 mins. (approx)

Original release
- Network: Channel 31 Melbourne
- Release: 7 June 2007

Planet Nerd is a television comedy variety programme broadcast on Channel 31 Melbourne produced by RMITV. It stars local Melbourne comedians Dan Walmsley, Paul Verhoeven, Ben McKenzie, Simon Barber, Jason English-Rees, Andrew Doodson, Lou Pardi, and Rob Lloyd, and features other local Melbourne talent as well. Segments from the program are uploaded to YouTube, and there is also an official video podcast.

Planet Nerd was nominated for Best Comedy Program in the 2008 Antenna Awards, which celebrate the best of Australian community television, though they did not win the award.

On 17 September 2008, a new interview with Rocket Boom creator, Andrew Baron, was posted on the Planet Nerd web site. While no other new content has appeared, the original twelve episodes were repeated multiple times by Channel 31, as late as June 2009. It was also broadcast on Triangle TV in New Zealand in 2007.

== Content ==
Aimed at the geek demographic, Planet Nerd offers a variation on the variety show format, with host Dan Walmsley acting as an anchor, sometimes accompanied by one of the other presenters, throwing to various segments which include documentaries, reviews and sketches. Each week the hosting segments are filmed in a different context, often forming a series of linked sketches themselves.

=== Documentaries ===
Aside from the overt comedic content, Planet Nerd also features original, semi-serious documentary segments which explore and celebrate various facets of geek culture. Subjects have included the roleplaying and wargaming convention Arcanacon, RoboGames, Sony's Wonder Technology Lab and National ICT Australia. A similar semi-regular segment is "Geek of the Week", in which a subject is interviewed by Ben McKenzie about their nerdy hobbies or profession.

Footage of John Carnack's presentation at Apple Computer's 2007 World Wide Developer's Conference was posted by Planet Nerd on YouTube, resulting in over 43,000 views, making the programme the number one watched comedian on YouTube for 12 June 2007.

=== Reviews ===
Paul Verhoeven reviews recent films in an anarchic sketch-based format, concentrating on genre films like Michael Bay's Transformers. Rob Lloyd's "One Minute DVD Review" awards scores out of "Seven Samurai", and instead of new releases focusses on classics, including box sets of early Doctor Who (The Beginning), The Muppet Show and the films of Harold Lloyd.

== Response ==
Planet Nerd has gathered some positive press, most notably in an article in The Age newspaper's Green Guide about Channel 31 programming, in which Marieke Hardy referred to the show as "magically dorky" and "adorably earnest".

Australian technology web site Gizmodo reported on a Planet Nerd publicity stunt in which they celebrated the release of the iPhone by selling an obviously fake oversized cardboard iPhone (a prop from the first episode) on eBay.

=== John Howard YouTube response ===
Dan Walmsley posted a Planet Nerd response, the first video response (as opposed to a text comment), to Prime Minister John Howard's YouTube video about climate change policy, a video later featured in a news.com.au article about the difficulty of finding the genuine article in amongst the remixes and parodies. The Planet Nerd video response has become an unofficial focus for debate on the site about Howard's announcement after commenting on the original video was disabled, with around 200 text comments and nearly 8,000 views.
