= Waleed Aly =

Australian television presenter, author and academic (born 1978)

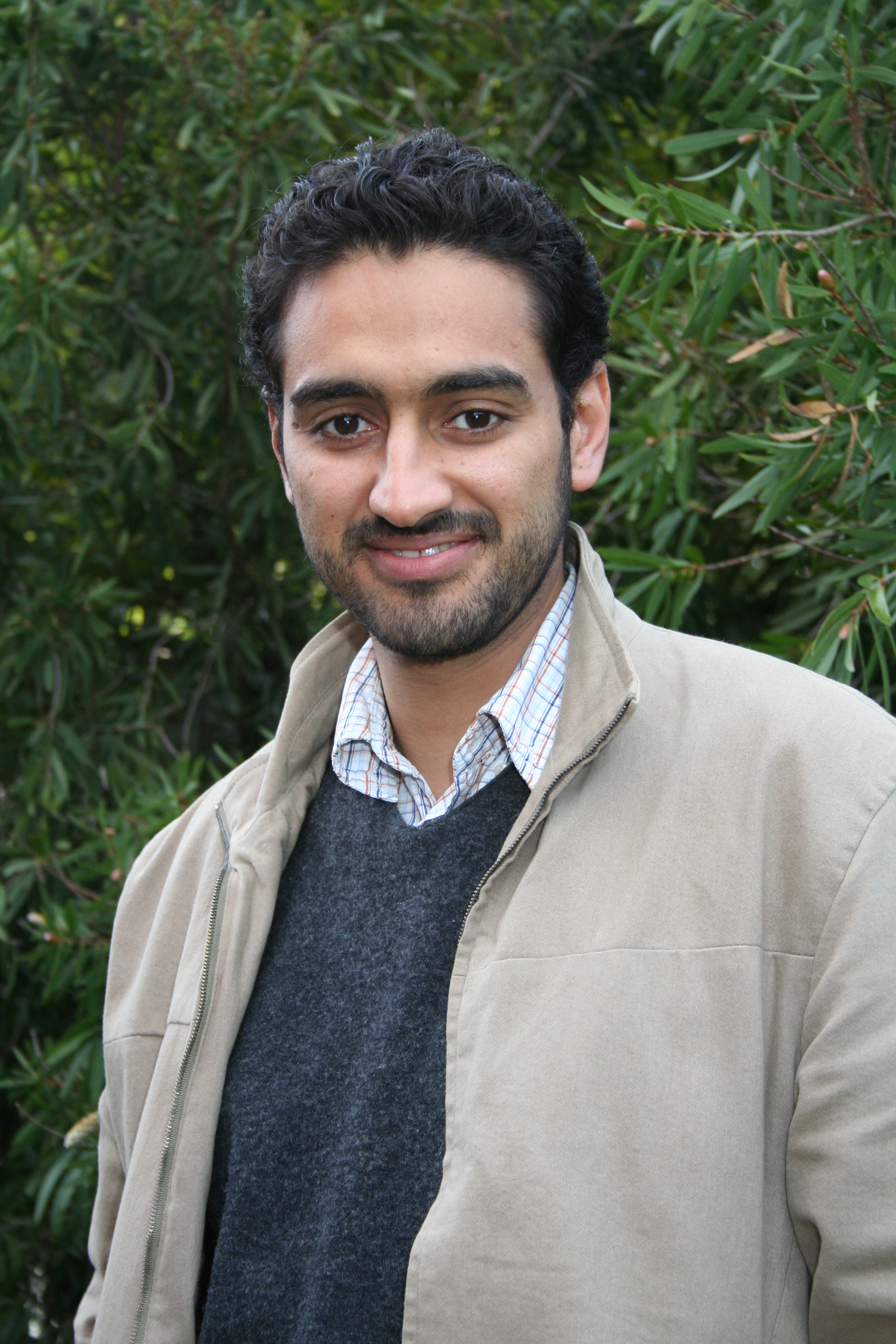
- Aly in 2010
- Born: 15 August 1978 (age 48); Melbourne, Victoria, Australia
- Education: Wesley College; University of Melbourne; Monash University
- Occupations: Author, journalist, newspaper columnist, radio and television presenter, lawyer, academic, guitarist, songwriter
- Years active: 1996–present
- Television: The Project
- Spouse: Susan Carland (m. 2002)
- Children: 2

Waleed Aly (born 15 August 1978) is an Australian television presenter, journalist, academic, and lawyer.

Aly is a lecturer in politics at Monash University working in their Global Terrorism Research Centre, and was also a co-host of Network 10's news and current affairs television program The Project. He also writes for Fairfax Media, co-hosts The Minefield, an ABC RN program about ethical dilemmas of modern life, and is lead guitarist in rock band Robot Child.

In 2016, he won the Gold Logie Award for Best Personality on Australian Television.

== Early life and education ==
Aly was born on 15 August 1978 in Melbourne, Victoria, to Egyptian parents. He is a Sunni Muslim. He grew up in the suburb of Vermont.

He attended Vermont Secondary College and later Wesley College, completing the International Baccalaureate in 1996. He then studied at the University of Melbourne, graduating with Bachelor of Engineering (Chemical) and Bachelor of Laws (with honours) degrees in 2002.

In May 2017 Aly was awarded a PhD, for his thesis on global terrorism titled Towards a structuration theory of global terrorism.

== Legal and academic career ==
After graduating, Aly worked as an associate to Family Court judge Joseph Kay and, until, 2007 worked as a solicitor in Melbourne for Maddocks Lawyers. In 2006, he was a pro bono lawyer with the Human Rights Law Centre, on secondment from Maddocks.

In 2007 Aly published People Like Us.

In 2008, he was selected to participate in the Australia 2020 Summit, a bipartisan convention held in Canberra to "help shape a long-term strategy for the nation's future".

Aly is a staff member of the Global Terrorism Research Centre at Monash University. He has said that most of the conflicts in the Middle East can be traced to the arbitrary way in which its territories were divided-up by Western powers by the ongoing demand for Middle Eastern oil and more recently by factors such as the 2003 invasion of Iraq. After the Boston Marathon bombing, describing terrorism as a "perpetual irritant", he said it is encouraging that we are finally maturing in the way we handle terrorism.

== Media ==
During his time as head of public affairs for the Islamic Council of Victoria, and a member of its executive committee, Aly was regularly interviewed on current affairs and news programs. His social and political commentary has appeared in newspapers including The Guardian, The Australian, the Australian Financial Review, The Sydney Morning Herald and The Age. In searching for reasons behind the suicide attacks in central London on 7 July 2005, Aly reminded readers of the Quranic passage, Do not let the injustice of others lead you into injustice.

Aly was the host of ABC TV's Big Ideas program on ABC1 and ABC News 24. He has been a regular guest co-host on The Conversation Hour with Jon Faine on 774 ABC Melbourne and The Project on Channel 10 and also was a regular panel member and producer on Salam Cafe, a weekly program presented by young members of Melbourne's Muslim community and produced by RMITV first for C31 Melbourne and later for SBS. He has also appeared as a panellist on ABC TV's Q&A program, and has been an occasional co-host on the ABC's News Breakfast.

He was the inaugural host of RN Drive on ABC Radio National (RN) in January 2012. In December 2014, Aly resigned from the ABC in order to become the permanent co-host of Channel Ten's The Project, starting on 26 January 2015. He returned to ABC RN in April 2015 to co-host The Minefield with Scott Stephens, in addition to his role on The Project for Channel Ten.

In November 2015, Aly criticised the extremist group Islamic State of Iraq and the Levant in a four-minute monologue titled "What ISIL wants" on The Project in the wake of the November 2015 Paris attacks, labelling them as "bastards" and calling for no one to fear them, because "they are weak". The video, written by Aly and producer Tom Whitty, was posted online and received 13 million views within a day.

In his 2016 Andrew Olle Media Lecture, Aly warned how the media could damage its authority with the public in the quest for high clicks and shareable content.

As of 2023, Aly continues to co-host The Minefield, along with religion and ethics commentator Scott Stephens and an expert studio guest each week, and continues his role on The Project.

In June 2025, The Project was cancelled by Network 10, with Aly subsequently leaving the network.

From 22 December 2025 to 11 January 2026, Aly hosted ABC Radio's Mornings in all states excluding Western Australia. He is a regular panellist on the ABC program Insiders.

=== Recognition and awards ===
At the 2005 Walkley Awards, Aly was commended in the category of Commentary, Analysis, Opinion and Critique.

In 2015, Aly and producer Tom Whitty were finalists for two Our Watch Awards (administered by the Walkley Foundation) for exemplary reporting to end violence against women, for their editorial, "Show Me The Money (Domestic Violence Funding)". The pair were also nominated for (and won) a United Nations Association of Australia Media Peace Award for Promotion of Climate Change Issues, with their "Renewable Energy Target" monologue. Aly and Whitty finished the year with a Walkley nomination for Excellence in Journalism in the All Media Commentary, Analysis, Opinion and Critique category, for a series of editorials including Show Me The Money, Renewable Energy Target, and Negative Gearing.

In May 2016, Aly won the Gold Logie Award for Best Personality on Australian Television, chosen by the public through an online vote.

In May 2016 Aly was Liberty Victoria's winner of the Voltaire Award for free speech. Writing in The Australian, Paul Monk has said, "In accepting his Voltaire Award, Aly needs to step up and champion freedom of speech in the Muslim world and freedom to criticise Islam itself, including the Prophet – as Voltaire himself did".

In June 2016, the Prime Minister Malcolm Turnbull hosted the first Iftar dinner, at Kirribilli House for Muslim community leaders. Aly and his wife, described as the "power couple", were seated at Table No. 1, next to the Prime Minister.

In August 2016, Aly and producer Tom Whitty were again finalists for two Our Watch Awards for exemplary reporting to end violence against women, for their editorial, "Click Something Else". In September, the pair were also again nominated for (and won) a United Nations Association of Australia (UNAA) Media Peace Award for Social Cohesion, with their "Send Forgiveness Viral" monologue. In October, Aly and Whitty received two Walkley nominations for Excellence in Journalism. First in the Television/Audio-Visual News Reporting category, for Milked Dry, their editorial on Australia's dairy pricing crisis, and in the Commentary, Analysis, Opinion and Critique category, for a series of editorials: "Click Something Else", "Milked Dry", and "ISIL is Weak".

== Music ==
Aly is the lead guitarist and principal songwriter for the Melbourne-based rock band Robot Child. The band contributed a track to the Jesuit Social Services' Just Music album, performing at the Famous Spiegeltent for its release. They were also widely praised for their cover of Pink Floyd's "Comfortably Numb" at the 2015 Walkley Awards.

Aly is a featured artist on "Surah Maryam" the 2021 Paul Kelly's Christmas Train album.

== Personal life ==
Aly lives in Melbourne and is married to Australian feminist author and academic Susan Carland, and they have two children. Carland converted to Islam aged 19 and holds a PhD from Monash University.

== Publications ==
- People Like Us: How Arrogance Is Dividing Islam and the West. Picador. 2007. ISBN 978-0-330-42380-9.
- What's Right?: The Future of Conservatism in Australia. Quarterly Essay. Black Inc. March 2010. ISBN 978-1-86395-466-2.
- Uncivil Wars: How Contempt Is Corroding Democracy. Quarterly Essay. Black Inc. September 2022. ISBN 978-1-76064-356-0.
- Time of Monsters: What Future for Liberalism?. Quarterly Essay. Black Inc. September 2026. ISBN 978-1-76064-581-6.
- Numerous articles.
