= Susan Carland =

Australian academic and author

- Born: Susan Janet Carland; 1980 (age 45–46); Melbourne, Victoria, Australia
- Education: Monash University
- Occupations: Author, academic
- Known for: Author and commentator on women in Islam
- Spouse: Waleed Aly (m. 2002)
- Children: 2

Susan Janet Carland (born 1980) is an Australian academic, author and television presenter best known for her ongoing media presence speaking on her academic speciality of women in Islam.

== Early life and education ==
Carland attended public schools. She has stated that one of her favourite recreational pursuits in childhood was ballet, which she pursued from the age of seven.

Carland grew up as a Baptist and Uniting Church Christian―although she later became a Sunni Muslim―and enthusiastically speaks of her upbringing.

Carland completed a Bachelor of Arts and Science at Monash University. She also obtained a doctorate from Monash in 2015, which focused on Muslim women combating sexism from within the religion's own traditions and communities.

== Career ==
Carland teaches gender studies, politics, and sociology at Monash University, with a special focus on Muslim women and Muslims in Australia.

She was a founding member and presenter of the SBS comedy talk show Salam Cafe.

Carland is active in the Islamic Council of Victoria and has appeared on Australian television and radio talk shows, typically providing a specifically Islamic and/or feminist perspective.

In 2018, she hosted the Australian version of quiz show Child Genius, on SBS.

In 2017, Carland wrote Fighting Hislam: women, faith and sexism.

== Personal life ==
Carland converted to Sunni Islam at the age of 19. She became increasingly interested in the religion and then converted in her first year of university.

Carland married Waleed Aly in 2002. They have 2 children and live in Melbourne.

== List of works ==
- Carland, Susan (2017). Fighting Hislam: Women, Faith and Sexism. Melbourne University Press. ISBN 9780522870350.
