= Sk82death =

Sk82death is an Australian skateboarding television series, featuring various dangerous, crude, ridiculous, and self-injuring stunts and pranks. The series is produced by and stars Sean Caveny.

== Awards ==
2006 and 2007 Antenna Awards for best Camerawork, as well as the 2007 Antenna's for Best Sports Program and Best Youth Program.
