= People Like Us (book) =

2007 book by Waleed Aly

- Author: Aly, Waleed
- Language: English
- Subject: Islam and the West
- Genre: Religion
- Publisher: Pan Macmillan
- Publication date: 30 August 2007
- Publication place: Australia
- Media type: Paperback
- ISBN: 978-0-330-42380-9

People Like Us, published in 2007, is a book authored by Muslim Australian academic, musician and former commercial lawyer Waleed Aly.

== Synopsis ==
The text alleges egocentricism and the "endless misunderstanding and mutual, cross civilisational ignorance" that - according to the author - pervade contemporary Islam-related attitudes and discourse. In the process it apologetically discusses issues including the hijab, jihad, fundamentalism, radicalism, and secularism.

== Chapters ==
1. A Danish Snapshot
  Discusses the issues and events surrounding the Jyllans-Posten cartoons depicting Muhammad in order to illustrate the current state of affairs between Islam and the West.
2. How Did We Get Here?
  Traces the history of Western attitudes to Islam, attitudes that - according to Aly - have often stemmed from ignorance and or misunderstanding of Islam.
3. Don't Call Me a Moderate!
  Analyses the terms 'fundamentalism,' (for which a more useful and widely applicable definition is provided) and 'moderate' (which the author judges to be an "explicitly political" designation).
4. Save Our Secular Souls
  Describes the many flavours of secularism, arguing that Western attitudes toward it have been shaped by Europe's personal experience of Church/State interaction. Aly contends that those who prescribe secularism as a cure for the Muslim World's ills fail to take into account Islam's unique history, and the fact that Islam lacks a 'Church' in the true sense.
5. Women as a Battlefield
  Discusses the veil and Western perceptions of it, suggesting that it has been, and continue to be, influenced by the West's self-image.
6. The War on Jihad
  Discusses in detail the concept of jihad, drawing a clear distinction between it and holy war.
7. What's so Medieval about al-Qa'ida?
  Explains that radicalism and terrorism are modern phenomena, having much more in common with Bolshevism than medieval Islamic thought.
8. Reformists, Reformation and Renaissance
  Makes the claim that the 'Islamic Reformation' advocated by some Western commentators has already taken place, and has produced mixed results.
9. Seeking the Human

== In the media ==
The book was discussed in detail in Ray Cassin's article Renaissance Man, published in the Age newspaper.

== Awards ==
People Like Us was shortlisted for several awards including the Queensland Premier’s Literary Awards and Best Newcomer at the 2008 Australian Book Industry Awards.
