= Arcanacon =

Australian role-playing game convention

- Status: Active
- Genre: Role-playing video game
- Venue: Melbourne High School
- Location: Melbourne
- Country: Australia
- Inaugurated: 1983
- Website: http://arcanacon.org/

Arcanacon is a role-playing convention held in Melbourne annually. It is one of several Role-playing conventions of Victoria, Australia run through the year.

Arcanacon is the longest running role-playing convention in Victoria.

In 1983 the convention was held at Melbourne University. As well as a Dungeons and Dragons major, it also included the second ever freeform to be run in Australia, as well as Traveller, DragonQuest, RuneQuest and Call of Cthulhu tournaments.

1984 saw the convention at University High School and the major appearance of Syd the Arcanasaur, the convention's mascot. In 1985 the convention moved to Melbourne College of Advanced Education, in 1988 it moved to Collingwood Education Centre where it remained until 2013. In 2014 it moved to Melbourne High School, joining Conquest www.conquest.asn.au and Unicon www.unicon.asn.au at that venue.

Initially the convention was held in September, but it later moved to August and then to July, where it was run during the Victorian School holiday period. In 2001, the convention moved to the Australia Day Weekend (the weekend closest to 26 January). The move was in part due to a perceived change in the focus of CanCon (which is run in Canberra on the same weekend) from mixed roleplaying and wargaming to solely wargaming.

Although sections of the convention had been run with various theme over the years, at Arcanacon XII the convention itself started running an overall theme. In 2000 this theme became a part of the events run at the convention, and games in the theme were sought out to give each year a different feel.

In 2007, a short documentary about roleplaying was filmed at Arcanacan XXI for the Channel 31 television programme Planet Nerd.

After a break from 2015 to 2017 Arcanacon returned in 2018 at the Melbourne Exhibition Centre with new organisers from the Melbourne Tabletop Gaming Conventions Inc. During the Covid19 Pandemic MTGCI rebranded Arcanacon as ArcRPG and moved it under the umbrella of other larger games conventions.

ArcRPG now runs the ARC TTRPG Online Con from Oct 2-4 each year and the independent tabletop gaming at PaxAus from 9-11 Oct during Melbourne International Games Week. ArcRPG also organises games at PortPlay for the Port Melbourne Council at St Kilda Town Hall & St Kilda Library on 17th April each year.

== List of conventions ==
- 1983 Arcanacon I
- 1984 Arcanacon II
- 1985 Arcanacon III
- 1986 Arcanacon IV
- 1987 Arcanacon V
- 1988 Arcanacon VI
- 1989 Arcanacon VII
- 1990 Arcanacon VIII
- 1991 Arcanacon IX
- 1992 Arcanacon X
- 1993 Arcanacon XI - First Eleven
- 1994 Arcanacon XII - The Dirty Dozen
- 1995 Arcanacon XIII - Unlucky for Some
- 1996 Arcanacon XIV
- 1997 Arcanacon XV
- 1998 Arcanacon XVI - Sweet Sixteen
- 1999 Arcanacon XVII - Summer of the 17th Troll
- 2000 Arcanacon XVIII - Arcanacon 1800s: A Victorian Roleplaying Convention
- 2001 Arcanacon XIX - Arcanacon 2001: a roleplaying convention
- 2002 Arcanacon XX - Akenaken: Secrets of the ancient world
- 2003 Arcanacon XXI - anniversaries, birthdays and celebrations
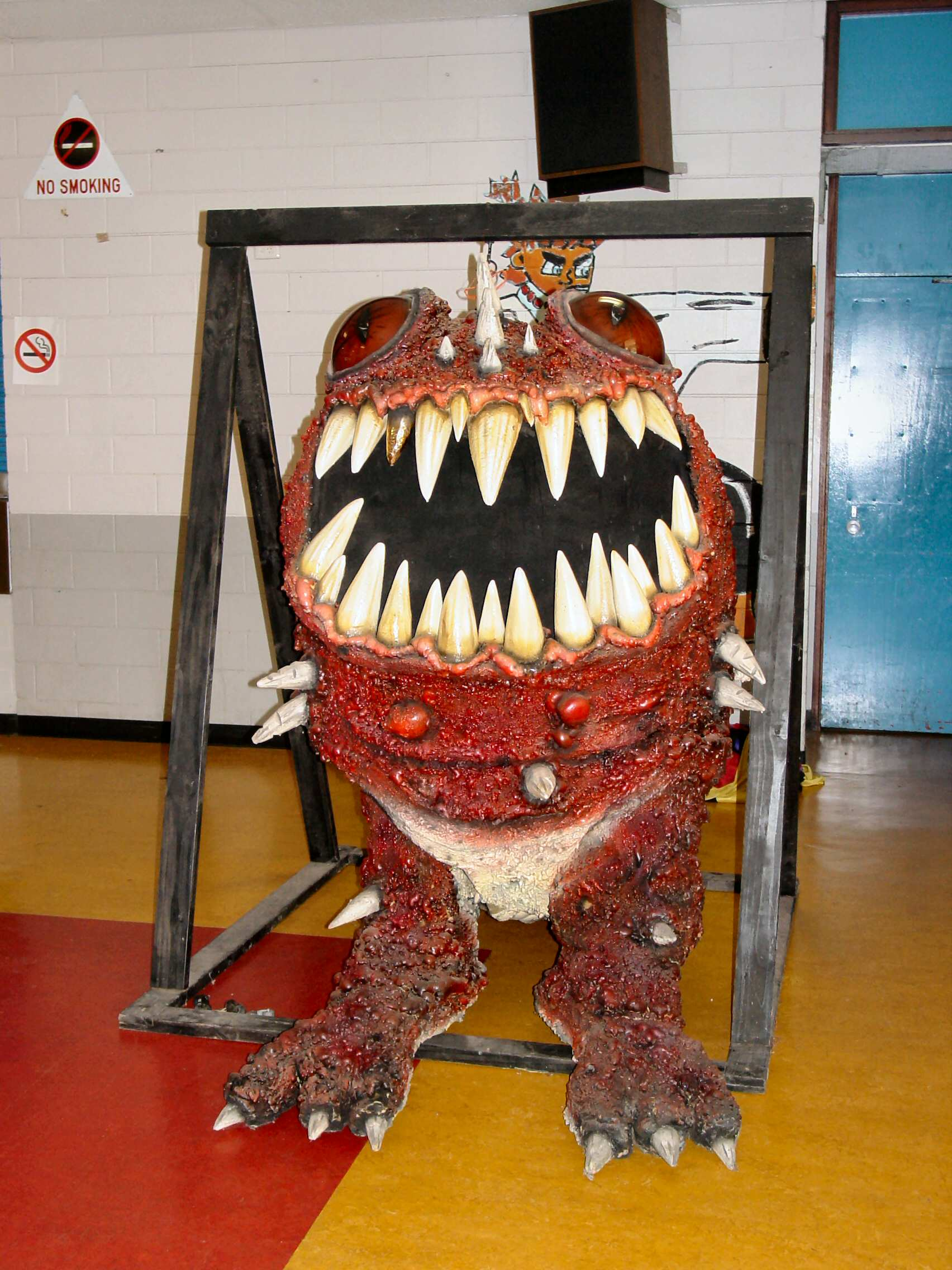
Syd the Arcanasour

Birthday Cake
- 2004 Arcanacon XXII - Folk Tales and Faerie Stories
- 2005 Arcanacon XXIII - conspiracies, secrets and paranoia
- 2006 Arcanacon XXIV - Swashbuckling, Exploration and Adventure
- 2007 Arcanacon XXV - Legends of the Silver Screen
- 2008 Arcanacon XXVI - Zombies, and Witches, and Dragons, Oh My!
- 2009 Arcanacon XXVII - Syd-Punk
- 2010 Arcanacon XXVIII - For Science!
- 2011 Arcanacon XXIX
- 2012 Arcanacon XXX - End of the World
- 2013 Arcanacon XXXI - After the Apocalypse
- 2014 Arcanacon XXXII - Rebirth
- 2015 Arcanacon XXXIII - Back to the Future
- 2018 Arcanacon XXXIV
- 2019 Arcanacon XXXV

== See also ==
- The Sunday Age (Australia), Gang Game Nazi-like, racist - police. 386 words, 31 May 1992, p. 5
- Sydney Morning Herald (Australia), Space Oddities. By Michael Idato, 1815 words 3 June 2000, Computers Section p. 10.
- The Age (Australia), Role-playing Nerdy? Nah!. By Carolyn Webb, 1058 words, 25 January 2001, Today Section p. 3.
- Ariel Archives CD, published by Brett Easterbrook (Ariel Archives website)
