= Sober companion =

A sober companion is a human services-related career path with the goal of helping the client maintain total abstinence or harm reduction from any addiction, and to establish healthy routines at home or after checking out of a residential treatment facility. Although regulations do not exist for the specific sober companion position, ethical existing peoples and businesses abide by the U.S. standards of mental health treatment. A sober companion may be a part of a whole medical and/or a clinical team of professional(s), may be formally licensed as a mental health professional, or have well-respected experience in the field and/or may work independently on their own.

== Service ==
Protocols for a sober companion when working with a client, their family, and/or friends are established immediately. These may include a psychotherapeutic approach, 12-step or non-12 step plan, other outside support groups, help establishing nutrition and fitness daily, medication therapy, or holistic practices. The primary duty of a sober coach is to ensure the recovering individual does not relapse. They may be hired to provide round the clock care, be on-call, or to accompany the recovering addict during certain activities.

A companion acts as an advocate for the newly recovering person and provides new ways for the client to act in their own living environment. A sober companion either completely removes the addict from their own environment of hidden stashes, or may search for hidden drugs in that environment, in an effort to prevent a relapse.

An engagement with a sober companion usually lasts 30 days or longer. The time required to effect a meaningful change varies depending upon the client, co-occurring disorders, and life at home. Ethically, a companion's presence in the client's life will titrate down as the client's ability to connect to newly defined healthy behaviors with family, work, and legal issues without relapse is proven. Some recovery coaches stay with their clients for many months, and some offer only transportation services (for instance, to and from treatment facilities or sober living homes). The sober companion's duties vary from case to case, from simply ensuring the client remains abstinent, to establishing and ushering a specific plan of recovered resources and relationships into their home and community.

Many sober companions are ex-addicts themselves and are sometimes hired in cases where a celebrity, actor or musician will not attend residential treatment, but must remain abstinent to complete a film or recording project. They are also depicted by some media outlets as "adult babysitters". Doctors may also refer to sober companions as "advocates" for actors, musicians, and other celebrities.

== Controversies ==
There has been controversy among sober companions over the use of drug replacement therapy and prescription drugs to ease withdrawal, cravings or other side effects of long-term narcotic and alcohol use. Sober companions are sometimes used as a replacement for residential addiction treatment or other forms of drug rehabilitation. Dr. Ronald J. Hunsicker, FACATA, National Association of Addiction Treatment Providers' president and chief executive officer, introduced an alternative perspective in mental health and addiction treatment programs. It was recommend that a combined approach be taken, particularly for people at high risk of relapse. Hunsicker's speech on “The Challenges for Implementing Evidence-Based Practices in Addiction Treatment" suggested that companions can help a patient successfully transition from a heavily structured, secure environment into the world where they previously failed to stay sober. Other experts are skeptical of the companion approach and its dependence on a single individual.

== Pop culture ==
The television series Elementary depicts Watson as a female sober companion to a modern-day Sherlock Holmes.

== See also ==
- List of twelve-step groups
- Drug addiction recovery groups
