= Temperance and Good Citizenship Day =

Civic observance in the state of Washington

- Observed by: State of Washington

Temperance and Good Citizenship Day is a civic observance in the United States state of Washington, established in 1923 and principally intended for observance in the state's schools. Temperance and Good Citizenship Day occurs annually on January 16, except for years in which January 16 is a "non-school day" in which case it occurs on the preceding Friday.

== History ==
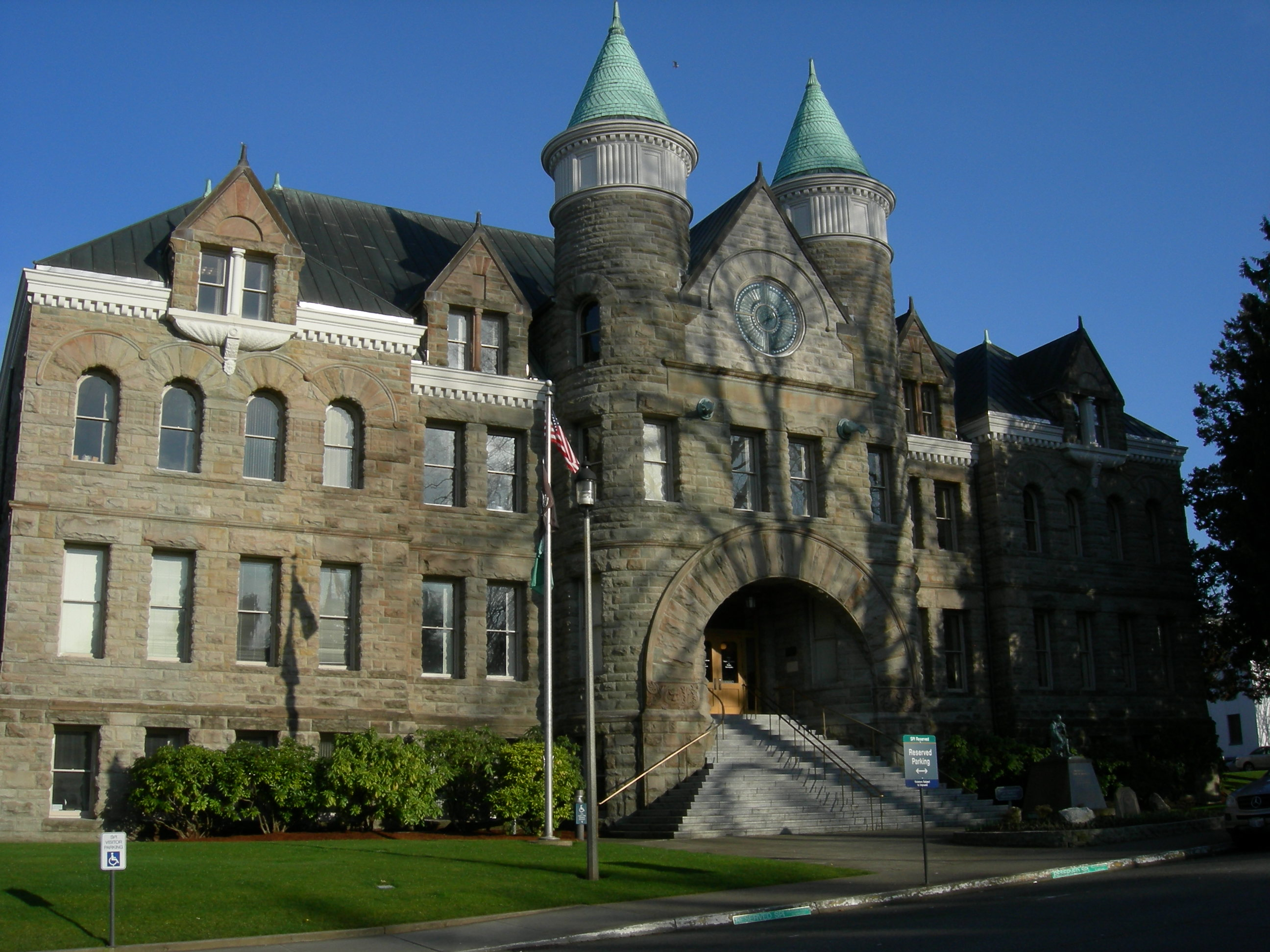
Offices of the Superintendent of Public Instruction in Olympia, charged by state law with Temperance and Good Citizenship Day observance

The Washington State Legislature established Temperance and Good Citizenship Day in 1923 with a statute that was subsequently codified as section 28A.230.150 of the Revised Code of Washington (RCW). The law established the date of the observance and mandated that the schools of the state use it to educate students about "the biographies of great leaders in temperance and good citizenship".

In 1969, the wording of the original law was amended to specify that "the state superintendent of public instruction shall duly prepare and publish for circulation among the teachers of the state a program for use on ... [Temperance and Good Citizenship Day] ... embodying topics pertinent thereto and may from year to year designate particular laws for special observance".

In 2013, a bipartisan group of legislators introduced Senate Bill 5753, which was designed to minimize the number of mandates of public schools in observance of lesser-known requirements of state law. Among other things, the law would have repealed the mandate that schools celebrate Temperance and Good Citizenship Day. The bill not only did not advance out of committee, but a competing piece of legislation was simultaneously enacted such that public schools in the state were expected to increase their Temperance and Good Citizenship observances by holding voter registration drives for eligible students on this date.

In a Sept. 23, 2013, memorandum to educators, State Superintendent of Public Instruction Randy I. Dorn offered this guidance on observance:

The original language of the 1923 Washington State law included specific language regarding education of the effects of alcohol and drug use; however this language was removed when the law was revised in 1969. While many interpret “temperance” to mean prohibition, as defined above, instruction on “temperance” may include information about prohibition, but it is not a specific requirement of the law. The 2013 Legislature added the expectation that Temperance and Good Citizenship Day include opportunities in our schools for eligible students to register to vote at school.

Many districts recognize this day by discussing temperance in connection with good citizenship, specifically addressing self-restraint. This idea of self-restraint is closely tied with many of the activities associated with Martin Luther King, Jr. Day. For example, a district may choose to discuss the accomplishments of peaceful, nonviolent protests in the civil rights movement of the 1960s. With the 2013 addition, schools will be encouraged to support eligible students to register to vote.

Along with Veterans Day and Disability History Month, Temperance and Good Citizenship Day is one of three civic observances for which schools in Washington state are required by the RCW to provide educational programming.

== See also ==
- Temperance movement in the United States
