= Vasili Kanidiadis =

Greek-Australian television personality

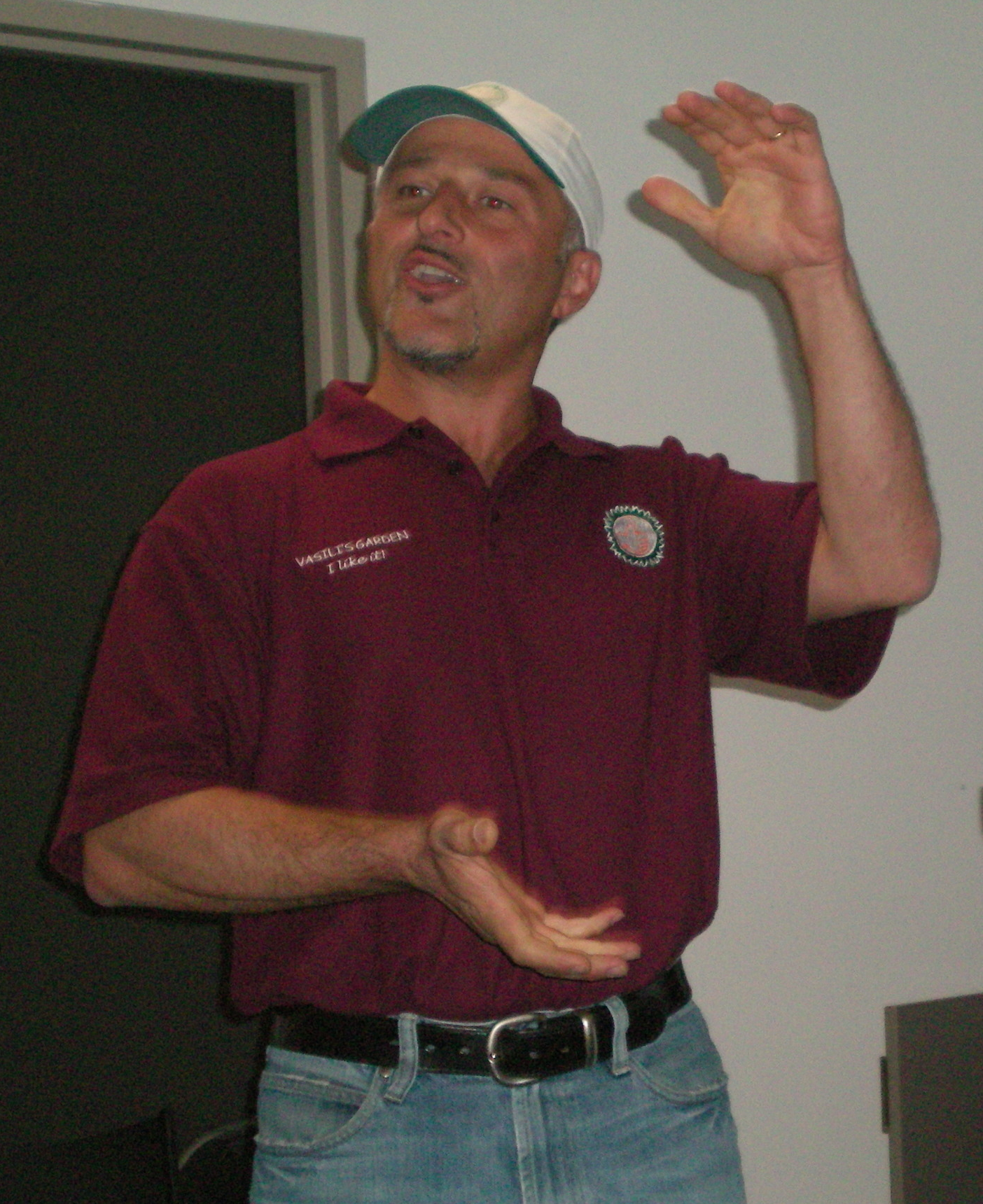
Kanidiadis in 2009.

Vasili Kanidiadis is a Greek-Australian television personality, best known as the host of the Channel 31 and SBS TV and Channel 7Two's gardening show, Vasili's Garden.

Kanidiadis grew up in Coburg in Melbourne's north. He began broadcasting on Greek radio station 3XY for 7 years before moving to Channel 31 He has studied structural engineering, classical piano and horticulture.

He was the owner and operator of Munro Street Nursery in Coburg, which closed down in 2023.

Vasili in Greece, commissioned by the Greek National Tourist Organisation, was screened on Channel 31 in 2008.
