= Vasili's Garden =

- Genre: Gardening lifestyle
- Created by: Vasili
- Written by: Vasili
- Directed by: Vasili Kanidiadis
- Creative directors: Peter Deske; Louis Kanidiadis
- Presented by: Vasili Kanidiadis
- Country of origin: Australia
- Original language: English
- No. of episodes: 400+

Production
- Executive producer: Vasili Kanidiadis
- Producers: Peter Deske; Louis Kanidiadis
- Cinematography: Peter Deske; Louis Kanidiadis
- Camera setup: Peter Deske; Louis Kanidiadis
- Production company: Maresi Productions

Original release
- Network: Channel 31 (2002–07, 2008–13); SBS (2007); 7TWO (2016–present)
- Release: 2002

Related
- Vasili's Garden to Kitchen

Vasili's Garden is an Australian television gardening program. Hosted by Vasili Kanidiadis, each episode of the show, which is unscripted, focuses on the plants and produce from home gardens in Melbourne and surrounding areas, with emphasis on traditional and organic methods of gardening and healthy eating. The show has become known for Vasili's lively and sometimes outlandish methods of presentation of the show, his piano accordion playing at the end of the show and his use of the Greek phrase maresi ('I like it') throughout the show.

The show first aired on community television station Channel 31 in 2002 and was produced by Vasili's and Peter Deskes' own production company, Maresi Productions. In 2007, after two years of negotiations, the show moved to SBS, collaboratively produced by I Like It Productions (a partnership between Maresi Productions and Renegade Films), with the main appeal being the reach of a national audience, unavailable up to that point on Channel 31. The format remained largely unchanged, owing to Vasili's insistence that the show retain its "home video" feel. Vasili sees this as an important aspect of the show, saying that he wants to make "people feel like they are watching their next-door neighbour's house or their aunty or uncle's house".

The show returned to Channel 31 on 6 February 2008 after further negotiations between SBS Deskes and Kanidiadis about a possible restructuring of the show failed. Production moved to the ABC studios in Southbank in late 2009 and then C31 studios until 2015.

Vasili's Garden has been broadcast on 7TWO since 2016 growing to a one hour episode.
