= Making Monsters (TV series) =

American television series

Making Monsters is an American TV series which follows the work at Distortions, a company in Greeley, Colorado which produces frightening animatronics for haunted attractions. Since 2011, the series airs on the Travel Channel annually from late September to late October, in the weeks before Halloween.

Ep. (prod.)	Ep. (aired)	First airdate	Title	Description
1.1	1.1	2011/10/02	It's Not Easy Making Monsters	Ed and his crew struggle to produce enough new products for the annual Transworld tradeshow, the top monster showcase. They must also improvise under pressure when two Evil Trees are damaged during shipment to Monster Mini Golf.
1.2	1.2	2011-10-09	Monsters of Rock	Alice Cooper, Monsterpalooza
1.3	1.3	2011-10-16	Aliens, UFOs and the Enigma	Distortions delivers an amazing alien installation for the UFO Museum in Roswell, NM, after major difficulty with the spaceship build. Jordu comes to Greeley to do a live mask sculpt of shock performer, the Enigma.
1.4	1.4	2011-10-23	Ultimate Haunted Houses	Distortions dives into the Halloween season with orders for two of the nation's most popular haunted house attractions during the same week. Additionally, they must fill a fifty-three-foot truck with props for Morris Costumes.
2.1	2.1	2012-09-30	Horrors For Houston	The Distortions crew works around the clock creating a new line of "shocktronics" in hopes of a record-breaking sale at the Houston Halloween & Party Expo in Texas.
2.2	2.2	2012-09-30	Zombie, Say Cheese!	Reinventing the classic "Photo Op" piece for Halloween Express. Ed and his crew come to the rescue of the band Megadeth, and Ed's office becomes a tattoo parlor.
2.3	2.3	2012-10-07	TransWorld 29.0	The TransWorld trade show is creeping up and the team creates Hell's Rider (a Grim Reaper character with a motorcycle), plus they bring back the huge Black Widow for her second appearance.
2.4	2.4	2012-10-07	You Bug Me	Distortions must create a giant, spitting centipede for Netherworld Haunted House in Atlanta. But that's not the only challenge ahead; Ed invites Jordu to a monster sculpt-off as well.
2.5	2.5	2012-10-14	Evil Tiki	Ed, Marsha and Jordu head to Hawaii where a local company has asked them to create, build and install an evil tiki statue in their entryway.
2.6	2.6	2012-10-14	Must Make More Monsters!	Creating three-headed "Dino Pods" for the traveling "Discover the Dinosaurs" attraction. Mike repurposes the Zombie Gusher, and Morris Costumes needs 4,000 monsters ASAP.
2.7	2.7	2012-10-21	Demon Dogs & Hell Hounds	The team pairs up with Microsoft Kinect to create an enormous demon, as well as demon dogs, for an interactive entrance to The Thirteenth Floor haunted house in Denver, Colorado.
2.8	2.8	2012-10-21	All Creatures Great and Scary!	The USS Nightmare needs an eerie "sea creature" mask for a spooky scare at its riverfront attraction. The team also turns an entire high school marching band into zombies.
2.9	2.9	2012-10-28	A Monster in Malibu	When TV and film legend Dick van Dyke orders a huge scare for his Malibu, California home, the team turns to new technology to get it perfect.
2.10	2.10	2012-10-28	Mega Monsters	A 25-foot (7.6 m) talking skeleton that takes people "to their deaths" at Creepywoods Haunted Forest in Maryland, and a Bigfoot monster for Morris Costumes.
3.1	3.1	2013-09-29	Distorters Make the Best Monsters!	Ed brings back sculptor Lee Joyner (Distortions longest in-house sculptor) to re-create some of his best-selling original pieces – The Candyman and Gothic Gargoyle.
3.2	3.2	2013-09-29	Mirror, Mirror Giant Zombie	Ed and his crew have made many zombies at Distortions, but nothing like this. Creative Director Russell Brown of Adobe, a computer software company, has ordered a giant zombie head to act as his podium for his upcoming creative conference in Denver, called the ADIM 13.
3.3	3.3	2013-10-06	Kiss Rocks the Beast	Owners Christina and Patrick Vitagliano of the Kiss Monster Mini Golf course in Las Vegas want Ed and the Distortions team to create a better, stronger, faster and more realistic 4-piece animatronic set to replace the existing band.
3.4	3.4	2013-10-06	Going Ape!	
3.5	3.5	2013-10-13	Saw Blade Massacre	
3.6	3.6	2013-10-13	Rattling Israel!	
3.7	3.7	2013-10-20	Slaughterhouse, Texas-Style!	
3.8	3.8	2013-10-20	Eaten Alive!	
