= Whose Shout =

1999 Australian television program

- Directed by: Bernie Carr
- Presented by: Stephen Hall (Bar Tender); Vin "Rastas" Hedger (Bar Tender); Tony Biggs (Bar Tender)
- Country of origin: Australia
- Original language: English
- No. of seasons: 1
- No. of episodes: 8

Production
- Executive producer: Jill Harris Vin "Rastas" Hedger Bernie Carr
- Production locations: RMIT University; Melbourne, Australia
- Running time: Approx. 60 min. (Including Commercials)
- Production company: RMITV (Student Community Television Inc.)

Original release
- Network: C31 Melbourne
- Release: 1999

Related
- What's Goin' On There? (1998)

Whose Shout was a weekly live variety hour television program produced by RMITV that broadcast on C31 Melbourne. The show was a reboot of Under Melbourne Tonight set in an old pub called the Stumpy Arms and had game elements like What's Goin' On There?. Tony Biggs, Stephen Hall and Vin "Rastas" Hedger played the role of bar tenders and Joel McLean played the role of race caller. Special guest punters included Adam Richard, Dave Hughes, Rod Quantock, Peter Helliar and many more. The show also featured music performances from artists such as Fred Negro.

== Cast ==
Presenter	Role	Tenure
Stephen Hall	Bar Tender	1999
Vin "Rastas" Hedger	Bar Tender	1999
Tony Biggs	Bar Tender	1999
Joel McLean	Race Caller	1999
