= What's Goin' On There? =

1998 Australian television program

- Directed by: Steve Messenger, Dan Flett
- Presented by: Stephen Hall (Host); Rastas (Host)
- Country of origin: Australia
- Original language: English
- No. of seasons: 2
- No. of episodes: 13

Production
- Executive producers: Jill Harris, Vin "Rastas" Hedger, Dan Flett
- Production locations: RMIT University; Melbourne, Australia
- Running time: Approx. 60 min. (Including Commercials)
- Production company: RMITV (Student Community Television Inc.)

Original release
- Network: C31 Melbourne
- Release: 1998

What's Goin' On There? was a weekly live variety hour television program produced by RMITV that broadcast on C31 Melbourne. The show was a reboot of Under Melbourne Tonight but with quiz show elements. The show featured a combination of theatre sports, live bands, topical quizzes and sitcom sketches. The regular cast included Stephen Hall, Vin "Rastas" Hedger, Tony Biggs, Corrine Grant, Bernie Carr and Bambii Lush as the scorer for the quizzes. Special guests included Alan Brough, Rove McManus, Wil Anderson, Adam Richard, Dave Hughes, Dave O'Neil, Lawrence Mooney, Peter Helliar. The second reboot of Under Melbourne Tonight was called Whose Shout and aired in 1999.

== Cast ==
Presenter	Role	Tenure
Stephen Hall	Host	
Vin "Rastas" Hedger	Host	
Tony Biggs	Supporting cast	
Corrine Grant	Supporting cast	
Bernie Carr	Supporting cast	
Bambii Lush	scorer	
