= Live on Bowen =

- Created by: Lisa Sloetjes; Darcy Bonser; RMITV - Student Community Television Inc.
- Written by: Josh Samuels
- Directed by: Nick Weller (Season 1); Matthew O'Mara (Season 2); Andrew Fenaughty (Seasons 3-5); Joseph Potter (Season 5-6)
- Country of origin: Australia
- Original language: English
- No. of seasons: 6
- No. of episodes: 55 (list of episodes)

Production
- Executive producers: Darcy Bonser (2012); Lisa Sloetjes (2012-2013); Jessica Cook (2012-2013); Jenny Bae (2013); Antonio Cafasso (2014-2015)
- Production locations: RMIT University; Melbourne, Australia
- Running time: Approx. 60 min. (Including Commercials)
- Production companies: RMITV (Student Community Television Inc.); RMIT Student Union

Original release
- Network: C31 Melbourne
- Release: 8 June 2012 – 29 June 2015

Live on Bowen was a one-hour Melbourne comedy talk show and variety show produced by RMITV with the support of the RMIT Student Union which aired on C31 Melbourne. The show featured comedic segments, special guest interviews and music acts ranging from the up-and-coming to high-profile artists. Like its predecessor Studio A, the show aimed to provide a platform to showcase an array of Melbourne’s up and coming talent.

== Origin of the name ==
The word Bowen was taken from the name of the street that runs through the RMIT City Campus which building 12, the building the TV Studios are located, was situated.

== Live broadcast ==
The show was broadcast live to air on C31 Melbourne from the TV Studios at RMIT University's City Campus for the first 3 seasons (2012-2013). As of Season 4 2014, C31 Melbourne relocated from their premises on the corner of Victoria and Swanston Streets to William Street near Flagstaff railway station, rendering the RMIT to C31 Melbourne Microwave link useless. Thus since then the show had been prerecorded as live in front of a live audience a week prior to broadcast.

== Hosts ==
The show was first hosted by Australian actor, comedian Rob Lloyd until Episode 8 of the 2nd season. Aaron McCarthy filled in for Rob for the remainder of the second season, while Rob was on tour with Who, Me at Edinburgh Festival Fringe, and was subsequently named host for the third and fourth seasons. Up and coming comedian and writer Simon Taylor took over the reins as host as of the fifth season until the shows sixth and final season.

== Guests ==
Guests have included Shaun Micallef, Amberley Lobo, Roz Hammond, Tim Ferguson, Rebecca Barnard, Sean Maher, Mitch Pileggi, Scott Allie, Marieke Guehrer, Cosentino (illusionist), Father Bob, Steve Bastoni, Adam Richard, Jason Chatfield, Paul Verhoeven, Andy Murphy, Claire Hooper, Catriona Rowntree, Scott Darlow Zoe Tuckwell-Smith, Peter Hitchener, Graeme Simsion Jarryd Blair, Erin Holland, Randy Feltface (Heath McIvor), Shura Taft, Tom Ward, Virginia Gay, Tom Hafey, Tottie Goldsmith, John Safran, Lola Berry, Steph Hickey, Nicholas J Johnson, Faiser Heigns, Jimmy James Eaton, Liam Amor, Brodie Harper, Lee Chan, Elena Kirschbaum (Ella Bella), Rachel Bergman, Danny McGinley, Greg Male, Lili Kendall

== Comedians ==
Some of the comedians that have performed stand up spots on the show are John Dore, Russell Wiggington, Rob Caruana, Demi Lardner, Jay Morrissey, Peter Jones, Sonia Di Lorio, Wendy Little, Simon Taylor, Hayman Kent, Bad Boys of Musical Theater, Michael Connell, Anthony Jeannot, Dilruk Jayasinha, JMac, Toby Halligan, Em O’Lockland, Charles Barington, Kate McLennan, Jennifer Wong, Wrongtown, Dave Warnake, Michael Connel, Petra Elliott, Ryan Coffey, Alasdair Temblay-Birchall, Phil Andrews, Tim Clarke, Jack Druce, Tony Besselink, Adam Francis,

== Musicians ==
Some of the musicians and bands that have performed on the show are Benjamin Provest, Joshua Aiello, Woodlock, Better than Wizzards, Buchanan, Amistat, Shelley Segal, The Zanes, The Mear Poets, Dizzy Dee, July Days, Ben Abraham, Ten Thousand, Blackchords, Nicholas Roy, Red Ink, Jen Cloher, Courtney Barnett, EMPRA

== Graphics and titles ==
Much of the animated GFX and title packages including the animated sequence seen at the beginning of the show were created by Jumbla Pty Ltd

== Cast ==
Presenter	Role	Tenure
Simon Taylor	Co-host, Host	2014—2015
Peter Jones	Co-host	2015
Elizabeth Davie	Co-host	2015
Lauren Bok	Co-host	2014
Michael Connell	Co-host	2013—2014
Claire Sullivan	Co-host	2014—2015
Rob Caruana	Co-host	2014—2015
Rob Lloyd	Host	2012—2013
Aaron McCarthy	Co-host, Host	2012—2013, 2013–2014
Hayman Kent	Co-host	2013
Dilruk Jayasinha	Co-host	2013
Susie Paterno	Co-host	2012
Stefan Taylor	Roving Reporter	2012
Craig Annis	Roving Reporter	2012

Fill-in presenters for Rob Lloyd: Aaron McCarthy

== Awards ==
=== Antenna Awards ===
Year	Nominee / work	Award	Result
2014	Live On Bowen	Outstanding Comedy Program	Nominated
2014	Live On Bowen	Outstanding Creative Achievement In A Program	Nominated
2014	Aaron McCarthy	Outstanding Male Personality	Nominated
2019	Live On Bowen	Best Comedy Program	Nominated
2019	Francis McKenna, Alex Marshall, Edward Hirst, Krissie Karpinski and James Bull	Outstanding Sound in a Program	Nominated
2019	Simon Taylor	Personality of the Year	Nominated
