= 2019 Antenna Awards =

Awards show honouring achievements in Australian community television

- Date: October 5, 2019
- Location: Deakin Edge, Federation Square, Melbourne
- Country: Australia
- Hosted by: Dilruk Jayasinha

Highlights
- Program of the Year: The Leak with Pat McCaffrie
- Personality of the Year: Emmylou McCarthy
- Website: c31.org.au/antennas

Television/radio coverage
- Network: C31 Melbourne; Channel 44 Adelaide; WTV Perth
- Runtime: 150 minutes (including commercials)
- Produced by: Shane Dunlop; William Henry Ellis; Alex Young; Karen Dennerley; Mitchell Kalika
- Directed by: Shane Dunlop

The 2019 Antenna Awards were held on 5 October 2019 at the Deakin Edge at Federation Square in Melbourne. The ceremony was announced on 4 July 2019, and recognised excellence in Australian community television of the eligibility period, running between 1 July 2014 and 30 June 2019.

It was hosted by comedian and former Live on Bowen presenter Dilruk Jayasinha. The ceremony was broadcast live from 8:00pm AEST on C31 Melbourne, Channel 44 Adelaide and WTV Perth, and was streamed live on Facebook. On 9 October, the ceremony was made available to stream on YouTube.

Awards were presented in 24 categories. Program of the Year was awarded to The Leak with Pat McCaffrie, while Personality of the Year was awarded to Emmylou Loves presenter Emmylou McCarthy. A special award, the Stella Young Contribution to Community TV Award, was presented to Nimal Alwis.

This was the 9th Antenna Awards ceremony – the first since 2014 – and marked 25 years since the first broadcast of C31 Melbourne. Nominations were accepted from producers of programs that aired on terrestrial community television – including the now-defunct Television Sydney and 31 Brisbane – as well as satellite and cable channels Aurora and ICTV.

== Performers ==
Artist(s)	Song(s)
Luis Brown; Mitch McTaggart; Tony Martin	"Community TV, Get In Me!"
Damian Cowell's Disco Machine	"(Here Comes The) Disco Machine"

== Winners and nominees ==
Best Comedy Program	Best Music Program
Australia, Get It Up Ya!; 31 Questions; Live on Bowen; Quiz Night; Silent Comedy; The Leak with Pat McCaffrie	The Songroom; 1700; Asylum TV; Don't F*ck With Mother; Live At Spectrum; Pass The Song Along
Best Narrative and/or Fictional Program	Best Actor in a Narrative Drama, Comedy or Sketch
Dee-Brief; Good Afternoon Adelaide; Seeing Scarlett; Sonnigsburg; Under The Milky Way; Windscreen Watch	Lee McClenaghan – Under The Milky Way; Andy Matthews – Australia, Get It Up Ya!; Elizabeth Barratt – Seeing Scarlett; Madeleine Culp – Aunty Plop Plop's Useless Shop; Mike Gorrie – The Assenders; Sophie Loughran – 31 Questions
Best Sports Program	Best Outdoor and Recreational Program
SA Sports Show; All About A-League; In Pit Lane; Spacequake Sports; The Local Footy Show; The Rushed Behind	Beyond The Divide; Off the Couch with Ethan; On The Fly; Oz Fish TV; Roaming The Outback; Top Of Down Under
Best Live and/or Outside Broadcast	Best Lifestyle or Special Interest Program
2017 Adelaide Fringe Parade; 2019 Melbourne Community Cup; Election 2019 presented by The Junction; Spacequake Sports; Talking Fishing; The Aunty Donna Live Spooktacular	Talking Fishing; Emmylou Loves; New Game Plus; Punktured; Random Aussies; The Cellar Door
Outstanding Direction in a Program	Outstanding Camera Work in a Program
Australia, Get It Up Ya! – Evan Munro-Smith; 31 Questions – Joe Murray & Antonio Cafasso; Dee-Brief – Sarah Hickey; Election 2019 presented by The Junction – Ron Frim; Good Afternoon Adelaide – Edgar Smith Jr; The Songroom – Ryan Gaskett & Kris Schroeder	Beyond The Divide; Australia, Get It Up Ya! – Evan Munro-Smith; Dee-Brief – Josh Mitchell-Frey; Nota Dominante; The Cellar Door – Kelly Hildreth, Ben Sengsouvanh & Kyle Horton; Top Property – "Oasis in the Dunes"
Outstanding Sound in a Program	Outstanding Editing in a Program
Good Afternoon Adelaide; Live At Spectrum – Brett Tippet; Beyond The Divide; Live On Bowen – Francis McKenna, Alex Marshall, Edward Hirst, Krissie Karpinski & James Bull; The Cellar Door – Kelly Hildreth; The Songroom – Sam Okell	Emmylou Loves – John Stokes; Beyond The Divide; Dee-Brief – Ryan Bird; Good Afternoon Adelaide; The Raucous Caucus; Top Property – "Oasis in the Dunes"
Outstanding Theme Song in a Program	Outstanding Creative Achievement in a Program
Under The Milky Way; Fishcam; Good Afternoon Adelaide; Nota Dominante; The Songroom	Seeing Scarlett; Silent Comedy; The Cellar Door; The Leak; Top Property – "Oasis in the Dunes"; Under The Milky Way
Best Youth Program	Youth Personality of the Year
Melbourne Underground; 31 Questions; Off the Couch with Ethan; Seeing Scarlett; The Rushed Behind; The Struggle	Nicholas D'Urbano – The Rushed Behind; Ben Cardwell – The Struggle; Dilpreet Kaur – Half Hour; Ethan White – Off the Couch with Ethan; Nikita Angelina Burling – Undercurrent; Tavleen Singh – The Struggle
Outstanding Contribution to Community by a Program	Best Culturally and Linguistically Diverse Program
Oz African TV; Bent TV; Broadcast Radio Australia; QTV; Spacequake Sports; Vibe Nation – "Stop the Violence"	Sputnik; Meraki TV; Regional Italian Cuisine; Russian News Time; The NEMBC Multicultural AFL Panel Show; The Shtick
Best Culturally and Linguistically Diverse Personality	Best Factual, Current Affairs or Interview Program
Harbir Singh Kang – The NEMBC Multicultural AFL Panel Show; Bernd Merkel – All About A-League; Gabriel D'Angelo – All About A-League; Marina Belkina – Russian News Time; Marlene Scicluna – Maltese Down Under; Vanessa Gatica – The NEMBC Multicultural AFL Panel Show	Tales of a City; Bent TV; Half Hour; Kicking Goals: A Year in the Life of a SAASTA Student; Saving The Sanctuary; The Modern Middle East
Outstanding Journalism in a Program	The Stella Young Contribution to Community TV Award
Half Hour; Dr. Pam; The Struggle; The Local Footy Show; Undercurrent – "2019 Night Of Stars Dancesport Championships"; Undercurrent – "Roe 8 Construction"	Nimal Alwis – The Sri Lanka Morning Show
Personality of the Year	Program of the Year
Emmylou McCarthy – Emmylou Loves; Ben Cardwell – The Struggle; Craig "Whiskas" Veysey – The Shed Show; David M. Green – 31 Questions; Ethan White – Off the Couch with Ethan; George Gayler – The Cellar Door; Jess McGuire – The Songroom; Simon Taylor – Live on Bowen	The Leak with Pat McCaffrie; Australia, Get It Up Ya!; Dee-Brief; Emmylou Loves; Off the Couch with Ethan; Sonnigsburg; The Modern Middle East; The Struggle
