= Leongatha (TV series) =

- Genre: Comedy drama
- Directed by: Shane Dunlop
- Starring: Chris Gibson
- Country of origin: Australia
- Original language: English
- No. of seasons: 1
- No. of episodes: 6

Production
- Running time: 30 mins (approx)

Original release
- Network: Channel 31
- Release: 9 May – 13 June 2013

Related
- Leongatha: The Movie!

Leongatha is an Australian television comedy-drama series which first screened on C31 Melbourne in 2013. The series was also released as a movie the same year.

== Plot ==
Denny Finch has been asked to film a cousin's wedding and he begrudgingly picks travels to the Victorian town of Leongatha from Wonthaggi by mini-bus with his family members, friends, the marriage celebrant and a mysterious stranger. The trip should take no more than an hour or two becomes a very, very long one with many misadventures along the way.

== Cast ==
- Chris Gibson as Denny Finch
- Sarah Ranken as Mazzy Smith
- Bryce Hardy as Darryl Finch
- Kate Mulqueen as Roo Finch
- Trevor Major as Bob Finch
- Roy Barker as Roy Finch
- Maureen Andrew as Lorna Finch
- Jane Menze as Jane Finch

== Episodes ==
No.	Title	Original release date
1	"The Bus"	9 May 2013
Denny Finch begrudgingly arrives in the country town of Wonthaggi where his extended family awaits aboard a minibus, ready to transport him to the nearby town of Leongatha for his cousin Darryl's wedding.
2	"The Funeral"	16 May 2013
The gang depart Wonthaggi en route to Cape Paterson to pick up the marriage celebrant where the trip is delayed further upon Denny's grandmother revealing her wishes to spread their dead grandfather's ashes at a nearby beach.
3	"The Search"	23 May 2013
The clock is ticking as the bus stops one more time to pick up members of the bride's family but before long one of them is missing and the rest of the gang are sent out to search for her.
4	"The 'Wombat'"	30 May 2013
The search for Mary has been called off but things go from bad to worse when Darryl takes the wheel and promptly runs over a local "wombat".
5	"The Breakdown"	6 June 2013
After a narrow escape from the law the bus to Leongatha keeps rolling but not for long as it finally comes to a sputtering halt, leaving Denny and the gang stranded in the middle of nowhere.
6	"The Wedding"	13 June 2013
After a long and arduous journey, the gang finally make it to Leongatha, but is it too little too late for Darryl & Carol?

== Awards ==
=== Antenna Awards ===
Year	Nominee / work	Award	Result
2014	Leongatha	Outstanding Creative Achievement In A Program	Won
2014	Chris Gibson	Outstanding Male Personality	Won

== See also ==
- Under the Milky Way
