= Australia's Brainiest =

- Australia's Brainiest Specials logo
- Genre: Game show
- Country of origin: Australia
- Original language: English
- No. of series: 2
- No. of episodes: 13 + 14 specials

Production
- Running time: 60 minutes

Original release
- Network: Seven Network (2004); Network 10 (2005–2006)
- Release: 28 November 2004 – 20 August 2006

Australia's Brainiest is a television game show series produced in Australia by Crackerjack Productions. It originally aired on the Seven Network before moving to Network 10. The format was taken from the British series Britain's Brainiest Kid.

The first season of Australia's Brainiest Kid was produced in May 2004, airing on the Seven Network on Sundays, starting 28 November 2004. It was hosted by Anna Coren. It was publicised through Australian primary schools, with children sitting an online test, followed by a selection of them taking a supervised written test. Of those that scored highly on these written tests, some of the highest scoring children appeared on the show as contestants. A second season was produced in 2005, and was broadcast on Network 10 at 6:30 pm on Sundays, starting 25 September 2005. It was hosted by Ten News newsreader Sandra Sully and co-hosted by Samuel Shaed.

The second season of Australia's Brainiest Kid was followed by a series of specials on Network Ten featuring celebrities, reality TV contestants and sports stars, under the Australia's Brainiest Specials title. After the broadcast of the specials no further series have been commissioned.

== Australia's Brainiest Kid ==
The format of Australia's Brainiest Kid went unchanged during its transition from the Seven Network to Network 10, except for the number of rounds and contestants. In the Seven Network version, there were 4 heats and a final, and 12 children per show; in Network 10's version, there were 7 heats and a final, and 9 children per show.

=== Season 1 ===
The first season aired on the Seven Network in 2004. Over 5000 children sat the online test, 800 were selected to sit the supervised test. All of them won copies of the 2004 CD-ROM edition of Encyclopædia Britannica.

Everybody in the third round went on to the final; they were competing for an Apple Computer iBook. The winner of the first series final, Aaron Chong, won the title of "Australia's Brainiest Kid" and A$20,000 to be held in trust until he turns 18.

=== Season 2 ===
The second season aired on Network Ten in 2005. 12,000 children sat the online test for the second season of Australia's Brainiest Kid, aired on Network 10. Some of them were selected to sit the supervised test. The seven winners of the heats, plus two others who made it into the final rounds of the heats played in the final. This series had considerably more children participating, mainly due to the popularity of the first series.

All contestants received a Mathemagic computer tutor from the Australian Institute of Mathematics as a "participation" prize. The heat winners received ASUS laptops. The winner of the second series final, William Xi, won the title of "Australia's Brainiest Kid" and a trust fund worth A$20,000 that he cannot touch before his 18th birthday.

Commentators noted that children of Asian descent dominated the preliminary televised rounds during this series. The Chaser's War on Everything parodied the series with an advertisement for "Australia's Brainiest Non-Asian Kid," in which a Caucasian contestant is unable to answer "What's two plus three?" correctly. The parody ended with promos for dozens of supposed upcoming Australia's Brainiest episodes featuring numerous animals, inanimate objects, and three subliminal messages.

== Australia's Brainiest Specials ==
Network Ten's specials pitted celebrities, sports stars and reality TV contestants from Ten's shows against each other with the winner given the opportunity to donate money to a charity of their choice. Episodes of Australia's Brainiest were normally rated G.

=== Australia's Brainiest Comedian ===
Australia's Brainiest Comedian aired on 24 November 2005, and was repeated on 16 April 2006. This episode of Australia's Brainiest was given the television rating of PG, for mild coarse language.

Contestants

- Mikey Robins (Winner)
- Red Symons (Runner-up)
- Bob Downe (Runner-up)
- Peter Berner
- Hamish Blake
- Greg Fleet
- Libbi Gorr
- Colin Lane
- Andy Lee

=== Australia's Brainiest TV Star ===
Aired on 12 February 2006. It was repeated on 28 December 2006.

Contestants

- Julia Zemiro (Winner)
- Andrew G (Runner-up)
- Gary Sweet (Runner-up)
- James Mathison
- Axel Whitehead
- Kate Kendall
- Paul Mercurio
- Mark Holden
- Ann-Maree Biggar

=== Australia's Brainiest Quiz Master ===
Australia's Brainiest Quiz Master aired on 19 February 2006, and featured winners from Nine Network's Who Wants to Be a Millionaire?, Sale of the Century and Temptation. It was repeated on 21 December 2006.

Contestants

- Stephen Hall (Winner)
- Rob Fulton (Runner-up)
- William Laing (Runner-up)
- Martin Flood
- Maria McCabe
- Virginia Noel
- Brigid O'Connor
- Trevor Sauer
- Cary Young

=== Australia's Brainiest Housemate ===
Australia's Brainiest Housemate aired on 26 February 2006, and featured Big Brother Australia housemates from the first five seasons.

Contestants

- Jemma Gawned (Winner)
- Chrissie Swan (Runner-up)
- Tim Brunero (Runner-up)
- Bree Amer
- Trevor Butler
- Jess Hardy
- Saxon Small
- Pete Timbs
- Greg Mathew

=== Australia's Brainiest Radio Star ===
Australia's Brainiest Radio Star aired on 5 March 2006, and the contestants were radio announcers from major FM networks such as DMG, Macquarie Radio Network, and Austereo. It was repeated on 7 December 2006.

Contestants

- Tom Gleeson (Winner)
- Jo Stanley (Runner-up)
- Barry Bissell (Runner-up)
- John Blackman
- Brigitte Duclos
- Bianca Dye
- Samuel Johnson
- Amanda Keller

=== Australia's Brainiest Olympian ===
Australia's Brainiest Olympian aired on 12 March 2006. The winner's prize money was donated to K.I.D.S. Foundation, a children's charity.

Contestants

- Steve Moneghetti (Winner)
- Neil Brooks (Runner-up)
- Matt Welsh (Runner-up)
- Steven Bradbury
- Elka Graham
- Shane Kelly
- Tamsyn Lewis
- Nova Peris-Kneebone
- Kerri Pottharst

=== Australia's Brainiest Musician ===
Australia's Brainiest Musician aired on 19 March 2006. The winner's prize money was donated to Club Friday.

Contestants

- Phil Burton (Winner)
- Toby Allen (Runner-up)
- Dave Graney (Runner-up)
- Angry Anderson
- James Blundell
- Cosima De Vito
- Leo Sayer
- Melissa Tkautz
- Katie Underwood

=== Australia's Brainiest Neighbour ===
Australia's Brainiest Neighbour aired on 26 March 2006. The contestants were actors whose characters were in soap opera Neighbours at the time of its broadcast. The winner's prize money was donated to Open Family Australia.

Contestants

- Stephen Lovatt (Winner)
- Nell Feeney (Runner-up)
- Caitlin Stasey (Runner-up)
- Stefan Dennis
- Patrick Harvey
- Blair McDonough
- Ben Nicholas
- Brett Swain
- Eliza Taylor-Cotter

=== Australia's Brainiest Footballer ===
Aired on 2 April 2006, featuring players from the various codes of football such as soccer, AFL, Rugby union and Rugby league. The winner's prize money was donated to the McGuinness McDermott Foundation.

Contestants

- Adam Kingsley (Winner)
- Nathan Buckley (Runner-up)
- Michael Crocker (Runner-up)
- Andrew Ettingshausen
- Peter Everitt
- Josh Hannay
- Jeremy Paul
- Jade Rawlings

=== Australia's Brainiest Cricketer ===
Australia's Brainiest Cricketer aired on 9 April 2006, and contestants were Australian cricketers.

Contestants

- Paul Reiffel (Winner)
- Greg Blewett
- Ray Bright
- Damien Fleming
- Rodney Hogg
- Kim Hughes
- Geoff Lawson
- Greg Matthews
- Colin Miller

=== Australia's Brainiest Loser ===
Aired on 6 August 2006, it featured all of the contestants from the first Australian season of The Biggest Loser. The winner's prize money was donated to the Australian Red Cross.

Contestants

- Jo Cowling (Winner)
- Kristie Dignam (Runner-up)
- Shane Giles (Runner-up)
- Ruth Almeida De Campos
- Fiona Falkiner
- David Hilyander
- Harry Kantzidis
- Tracy Moores
- Vladimir "Big Wal" Milberg
- Adriano Sarnelli
- Artie Rocke
- Cat White

=== Australia's Brainiest BB06 Housemate ===
Australia's Brainiest BB06 Housemate aired on 13 August 2006, and featured nine housemates from Big Brother 2006. David donated his prize money to Parents, Families and Friends of Lesbians and Gays. This episode was classified PG without consumer advice. It was repeated on Thursday 14 December 2006.

Contestants

- David Graham (Winner)
- Dino Delic (Runner-up)
- Jamie Brooksby (Runner-up)
- Claire Madden
- Gaelan Walker
- Katie Hastings
- Camilla Severi
- Anna Lind-Hansen
- Michael McCoy

=== Australia's Brainiest Comedian 2 ===
Australia's Brainiest Comedian 2 aired on 17 August 2006, and featured an all new batch of Australian comedians. The winner's prize money was donated to Anaphylaxis Australia. This episode was classified PG without consumer advice.

Contestants

- Peter Helliar (Winner)
- Cal Wilson (Runner-up)
- Dave Hughes (Runner-up)
- Dave O'Neil
- Russell Gilbert
- Jodie Hill
- Corinne Grant
- Frank Woodley
- Richard Stubbs

=== Australia's Brainiest Idol ===
Australia's Brainiest Idol aired on 20 August 2006, and featured former contestants from the reality-TV series, Australian Idol. It was repeated on 25 November 2006 on the eve of the Australian Idol fourth-season finale.

Contestants

- Marty Worrall (Winner)
- Dan O'Connor (Runner-up)
- Amali Ward (Runner-up)
- Kate DeAraugo
- Casey Donovan
- Dan England
- Lee Harding
- Hayley Jensen
- Em Rusciano
