= Off the Couch with Ethan =

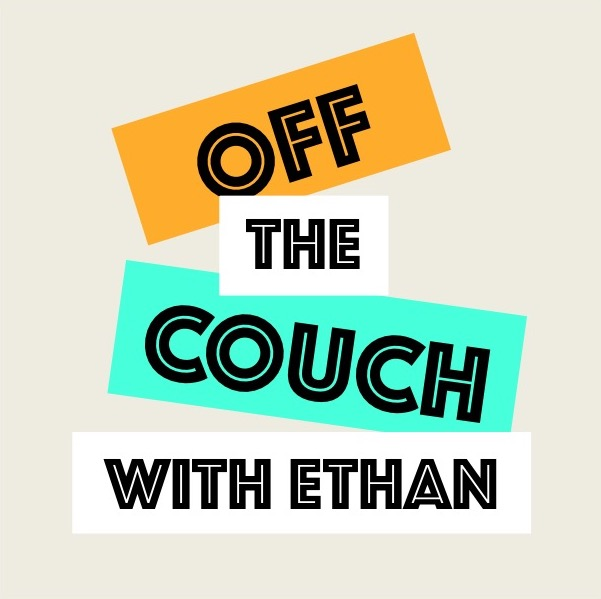
- Genre: Travel
- Created by: Ethan White
- Country of origin: Australia
- Original language: English
- No. of seasons: 2
- No. of episodes: 15

Production
- Running time: 25 minutes

Original release
- Network: Channel 44 Adelaide
- Release: 23 June 2018 – 21 January 2024

Off the Couch with Ethan is an Australian travel television program, produced and presented by student Ethan White. The program is aimed at teenagers and their families, and presents Australian landmarks, towns and points of interest. It airs on C31 Melbourne & Geelong and Channel 44 Adelaide. Episodes are directed at high-school-aged students and their families.

== History ==
White was born in Adelaide, South Australia and resides in the town of Gawler, 40 kilometres north of Adelaide. He has been interested in filmmaking since his childhood, and frequently camping his family at locations in South Australia, where he made family holiday videos.

In November 2017, at the age of 15, White contacted Channel 44 Adelaide, a community television station that broadcasts to the Greater Adelaide region. He proposed an idea for a travel-themed television program that encourages young people to get outdoors with their families, and secured a program slot with the title "Off the Couch with Ethan." In April 2018, filming for the first episode took place in the Southern Flinders Ranges in South Australia. The episode was broadcast on Saturday 23 June 2018 on Channel 44 Adelaide.

New episodes of the program continue to be broadcast on Channel 44 Adelaide, as well as C31 Melbourne & Geelong, which began broadcasting the program in early 2019.

== Episodes ==
Season	Episodes	Originally released	
Season	Episodes	First released	Last released
1	9	23 June 2018	3 April 2021
2	6	6 August 2022	21 January 2024

=== Season 1 (2018–21) ===
No.	Title	Original release date
1	"Southern Flinders Ranges"	23 June 2018
2	"Burra"	11 August 2018
3	"Central South Australia Road Trip - Part 1"	18 August 2018
4	"Central South Australia Road Trip - Part 2"	24 November 2018
5	"Gawler"	20 April 2019
6	"Great Ocean Road & Otways"	27 April 2019
7	"Outback New South Wales"	20 November 2019
8	"The Barossa"	28 June 2020
9	"South East South Australia"	3 April 2021

=== Special (2012) ===
No.	Title	Original release date
1	"A Chat with the Governor"	12 March 2022

=== Season 2 (2022–24) ===
No.	Title	Original release date
1	"Western South Australia"	6 August 2022
2	"Copper Coast"	13 August 2022
3	"Central Flinders Ranges"	31 December 2023
4	"Southern Yorke Peninsula"	7 January 2024
5	"The Story of Maralinga"	14 January 2024
6	"Tasmania"	21 January 2024

== Awards ==
In January 2019, White was named a joint winner of the Town of Gawler Young Citizen of the Year for outstanding efforts and contribution to the community.

In October 2019, White and Off the Couch with Ethan were nominated for five categories at the 2019 Antenna Awards: Best Outdoor or Recreational Program, Best Youth Program, Youth Personality of the Year, Personality of the Year and Program of the Year.

White and the program were again nominated for four categories at the 2021 Antenna Awards, including Best Outdoor or Recreational Program, Best Youth Program, Best Youth Personality and Personality of the Year. In September 2021, Off the Couch with Ethan won the Antenna Award for Best Outdoor or Recreational Program.

In January 2022, White was awarded the Town of Gawler Young Citizen of the Year for 2022, for his efforts in community contribution, including charity work, promotion of the community and assisting the youth of Gawler.

In October 2023, Off the Couch with Ethan was nominated for three categories at the 2023 Antenna Awards.

== See also ==
- Community television in Australia
