= Eastern Newsbeat =

Eastern Newsbeat is a local community television program in Melbourne, Australia on Channel 31 Melbourne.

== Staff history ==
The producer of Eastern Newsbeat was Peter McArthur until 2014. McArthur was also president of C31 for 5 years until 2010 and was still a Director of the Board at Channel 31/Digital 44 until 2016.

Peter McArthur and Eastern Regional Access Television (ERA-TV) were instrumental in getting parliamentary support for Channel 31 to move from Analogue to Digital in 2014. Bill Page took over as producer in 2015 and continues to produce Eastern Newsbeat with Reporter/Producer Tricia Ziemer and Peter McArthur as a reporter. As well as being the Producer of Eastern Newsbeat in the past, McArthur is also a member and secretary of one of the original community groups Eastern Regional Access Television INC, and he helped establish Channel 31 Melbourne and Geelong as a community televisions station in 1994.

== Productions ==
ERA-TV auspices three television series at Channel 31/Digital 44.

The series "A House Around the Corner", produced and directed by Tricia Ziemer, which features Learn Local Centres across Australia. The show ran for two seasons from 2013 to 2014 on C31 in Melbourne, Perth, and Adelaide.

The third season was called "A Green House Around the Corner" shown in 2015 and featured Learn Local Centres across Australia who remodeled to add sustainability features, such as Solar Power, to decrease their running costs and their carbon footprint so they could maintain low training fees for their students.

The other series that ERA-TV auspice, Produced and Directed by Tricia Ziemer, is called "Kidz in the Kitchen" with Gabriel Gate', the French-Australian Chef. The shows 8th season was in 2016 on C31 Melbourne, Adelaide and Perth.
