= 2014 Antenna Awards =

Awards show honouring achievements in Australian community television

- Date: October 1, 2014
- Location: Deakin Edge, Federation Square, Melbourne
- Country: Australia
- Hosted by: Tegan Higginbotham

Highlights
- Most awards: No Limits, Leongatha (2)
- Outstanding Program of the Year: No Limits

Television/radio coverage
- Network: Channel 31
- Runtime: 120 minutes (including commercials)
- Produced by: Shane Dunlop; Caitlin Jolly; Tessa Irwin; Tony Zajko
- Directed by: Jason Annesseley; Tony Zajko

The 2014 Antenna Awards were held on 1 October 2014 at the Deakin Edge at Federation Square in Melbourne. The ceremony was announced on 1 July 2014, and recognised excellence in Australian community television of the eligibility period, running from 1 January 2013 to 31 May 2014.

It was hosted by comedian and former Studio A presenter Tegan Higginbotham. The ceremony was broadcast live on C31 Melbourne, and relayed on delay to TVS Sydney, 31 Digital Brisbane and WTV Perth. On 21 May 2015, the ceremony was made available to stream on YouTube.

Awards were presented in 13 categories. Program of the Year was awarded to No Limits, while Outstanding Female Personality and Outstanding Male Personality were awarded to Phyllis Foundis and Chris Gibson respectively.

This was the 8th Antenna Awards ceremony, revived to celebrate 20 years since the first broadcasts of community television in Melbourne and Brisbane. Weeks before the ceremony was held, the Minister for Communications, Malcolm Turnbull, announced that community television stations would no longer be licensed to access terrestrial broadcast spectrum from January 2016. While subsequent license extensions were granted, it would be the last Antenna Awards to air on terrestrial television in Sydney and Brisbane.

== Performers ==
Artist(s)	Song(s)
My Lasting Reply	"Steal Your Heart"
Ginger and Tonic	"Love Shack"
Pierce Brothers	"Flying Home"
Ras Jahknow	"Get Up & Live"

== Winners and nominees ==
Outstanding Arts Program	Outstanding Comedy Program
Inside Art; Behind The Words; Sacred Spaces; The Bec Mac Show; Wood Working Masterclass	Famous With Luis; Community Kitchen; Live On Bowen; Schlocky Horror Picture Show
Outstanding Factual, Current Affairs or Interview Program	Outstanding Music Program
Undercurrent; Inside Art; No Limits; The Exchange; Top Brands	Speaker TV; Asylum TV; Basement Apes Live; Frequency; The Story So Far
Outstanding Youth Program	Outstanding Creative Achievement In A Program
Real; 1700; Enquiring Minds; Snaps Kakadu Club; The Why Generation	Leongatha; Being Overseas; Jumping Jellybeans; Live On Bowen; The Buzz
Outstanding Outdoor or Recreational Program	Outstanding Special Interest or Lifestyle Program
The Green Corridors of Southern Sydney; Beyond Gardens Live; Beyond The Divide; Rev Heds – "Calder Park Raceway"; Vasili’s Garden To Kitchen	Beyond The Divide; AFN Fishing Show; Being Overseas – "Japan"; Get Dirty with Milton; Postcards From The Bush
Outstanding Sports Program	Outstanding Culturally and Linguistically Diverse Program
The Local Footy Show; Australian Electric Superbikes; Blend Line TV; Rev Heds; The Sledge	No Limits – "Disability In The Solomons"; Dutch TV; Indigenous Models Of Achievement; Oz Indian; Russian News Time
Outstanding Female Personality	Outstanding Male Personality
Phyllis Foundis – The Foundis Show; Candice Barnes – The Buzz; Lara Shannon – Eco TV; Lindi Jane – Snaps Kakadu Club; Yana Portnoy – FASX	Chris Gibson – Leongatha; Aaron McCarthy – Live on Bowen; Luis Brown – Famous With Luis; Jeremy Dooley – Asylum TV; Vasili Kanidiadis – Vasili’s Garden To Kitchen
Program of the Year
No Limits; Being Overseas; Get Dirty with Milton; The Foundis Show; The Y Generation
