= Hollywood's Comedy Nights =

Hollywood's Comedy Nights is an English-language stand-up comedy show in Cologne, Germany. The show was started by stand-up comedian, actor and MC Johnny "Hollywood" Rotnem, and has played in numerous venues since 2000. It has also been a part of the Cologne Comedy Festival since 2003, and claims to have been the first English-language stand-up comedy show in Germany.

== History ==
Hollywoods Comedy Nights was founded by John "Hollywood" Rotnem to give himself and other comedians regular stage-time in which to practice and improve their act. Initially, just one German-language show was performed, monthly, at the Melody Club. On moving to Flanagan's in the Altstadt in 2004, the show became two separate monthly shows, one featuring German-language performers, the other featuring comedy in English, due to demand from the large British/American Forces and English-speaking expatriate community in the North Rhine Westphalen area. The show began featuring both local native-English-speaking comedians, German who wished to try their hand at English language comedy, and imported native-English comedians from the UK, US and Canada.

With the move to the Cologne Hard Rock Cafe, the show concentrated solely on English-language stand-up comedy, as the audience for the German-language show had dropped off, and because many people confused the English and German shows. A sister show, at Fiddlers Pub in Bonn-Endenich, started in March 2007. By mid-2007, a change of ownership and new limitations on live shows at the Hard Rock Cafe forced a change of venue, to the Alter Wartesaal at Cologne Hauptbahnhof. The large size of the Alter Wartesaal and the positioning of the show in the week (Mondays) made it extremely difficult to fill, and so only three shows took place there. The show then moved back to Flanagan's Irish Pub in the Altermarkt, not far from the Alter Wartesaal.

Many comedians have performed in the shows, such as Heinz Gröning(better known to German audiences as der Unglaubliche Heinz, moderator of "Um Antwort wird Gebieten"(Comedy Central) and "FunkHaus" (WDR)), Chris McCausland, Steve Day and Pommy Johnson. The show features established English-speaking comedians, as well as giving German performers the chance to try their hand at performing in English.

== Importance ==
The show is one of a growing number of venues in Germany that feature English-language performers, other notable venues being The English Comedy Club in Munich and The Kookaburra Comedy Club in Berlin. As well as featuring native-speaking English comedians, the show gives German comedians the chance to try their hand at comedy in the English language.

== Offshoots ==
In an attempt to produce more local English-language comedians, Johnny Hollywood founded Comedians Anonymous, a comedy collective which aims to help fledgling comedians take their first steps as performers. Some members of the collective are occasionally featured in the Comedy Nights show. The most frequently-performing members of the collective (so far) are James Allan(UK), Casey James(USA), Cat LaRouge(Norway) and Steve Dix(UK).

An Open Mike Night is occasionally staged, as another way of finding new talent.

== Venues ==
From	To	Location
2003	2003	Melody Jazz Club.
2004	2005	Flanagan's Irish Pub, Altermarkt, Cologne.
2005	2007	Hard Rock Café, Gurzenicherstr, Cologne.
2007	2007	Alter Wartesaal, Hauptbahnhof, Cologne.
2007	2008	Fiddler's Irish Pub, Frongasse 9, Bonn-Endenich.
2008	??	Flanagan's Irish Pub, Altermarkt 36, Cologne.

== Performers ==
The following is a list of some of the comedians who have performed at the show, and the dates they performed. Dates before 2007 are difficult to ascertain due to lack of 3rd party details. To add to the confusion, some performers have only performed in the German shows, some in both, and some in the English shows. the list is by no means exhaustive, and only includes notable comedians and doesn't include show presenters.

Key : C - Cologne, B - Bonn, F - Cologne Comedy Fest

Performer	Nationality	Location	Date(s)
Hils Barker	UK	CBF	2003(?) Oct 2007
Tamika Campbell	USA	CF	Sept 2008, March 2009, Oct 2009
Steve Day	UK	CB	May 2007
Dave Deeble	US	C	Nov 2008, May 2009
Henrik Elmer	Sw	CBF	Oct 2007
Gernot Frischling	DE	C	2003(?) June 2008
Heinz Gröning	De	CB	2005, March 2007
Pommy Johnson	AUS	CF	2004(?)
Paul Kerensa	UK	C	?
Chris McCausland	UK	CB	March 2007
Ciaran McMahon	Éire	CB	Nov 2007, Mar 2008
Earl Okin	UK	CBF	Oct 2007
Olga Putin	De	CB	2005, March 2007, Nov 2007, Sept 2008
Gaby O'Reilly	DE/Éire	CB	Nov 2007
Lianne Ross	UK	CF	Oct 2008
Christian Schiffer	DE	CF	Sept 2008, Oct 2008, Nov 2008
Ramona Schukraft	De	C	2004, 2005, 2006
Sanjay Shihora	DE	C	2006 (2008 performance cancelled due to injury)

== Links ==
Comedian Manuel Wolff performing at Flanagan's
