= Sketchmen =

Australian comedy troupe

Sketchmen is an Australian comedy troupe formed in 2005. The troupe's members are Michael, James, Jay and Casey.

== Sketchmen (TV Series) ==
Their first television programme; the sketch comedy series Sketchmen, aired throughout 2006-2008 on Sydney's TVS, Adelaide's C31, C31 Melbourne as well as Perth and New Zealand community stations. The series consisted of six half-hour episodes, each with a mini-mockumentary covering a different subject each week. Repeats of the show are still aired.

== Other media ==
Selected sketches aired in a series by U.S. network The CW called Online Nation.

Other sketches are also featured on Fairfax Media websites around Australia, such as the online websites of The Sydney Morning Herald and The Age.

Sketchmen also utilizes online networking such as Myspace, Vimeo and YouTube to reach its audience.
