= Outland (TV series) =

Australian television comedy series

- Genre: Comedy
- Created by: John Richards; Adam Richard
- Written by: John Richards; Adam Richard
- Directed by: Kevin Carlin
- Starring: Christine Anu; Ben Gerrard; Paul Ireland; Adam Richard; Toby Truslove
- Country of origin: Australia
- Original language: English
- No. of seasons: 1
- No. of episodes: 6

Original release
- Network: ABC1
- Release: 8 February – 14 March 2012

Outland is an Australian television comedy series which screened in 2012 on ABC1. The six-part comedy series was written by John Richards (episodes 1–6) and Adam Richard (episodes 1–3). It is based on the 2006 short film of the same name. Outland is the first Australian television series to feature all gay and lesbian characters.

The first public screening of Outland took place at the science fiction convention Continuum 7, where brief clips of episodes 1 and 4 were shown on 12 June 2011. The full series was played over two nights at the 16th Seattle Lesbian & Gay Film Festival, on 18 and 19 October 2011, where it won an audience award. The series was also screened at the 3rd annual Bent-Con convention in Burbank, California, on 2 December 2012.

The first episode screened on Australian television on 8 February 2012, at 9.30pm. In New Zealand, it screened in February–March 2014 on digital channel Choice TV.

== Overview ==
Outland revolves around the lives, loves and never-ending dramas of the members of a gay science-fiction fan club.

== Cast ==
=== Main / regular ===
- Christine Anu as Rae
- Ben Gerrard as Toby
- Paul Ireland as Andy
- Adam Richard as Fab
- Toby Truslove as Max

=== Guests ===
- Roz Hammond as Simon (1 episode)

== Social media ==
Outside of the show itself, the character of Fab had a Twitter feed (@FabXXL), and Adam Richard would blog in character as Fab, where he talked about what happened in the week's episode and reviewed a science fiction film. Writer John Richards has online commentary tracks that can be synced up to each episode.

== Episodes ==
No.	Title	Directed by	Written by	Original release date
1	"Max"	Kevin Carlin	John Richards & Adam Richard	8 February 2012
2	"Rae"	Kevin Carlin	John Richards & Adam Richard	15 February 2012
3	"Andy"	Kevin Carlin	John Richards & Adam Richard	22 February 2012
4	"Fab"	Kevin Carlin	John Richards	29 February 2012
5	"Toby"	Kevin Carlin	John Richards	7 March 2012
6	"Pride"	Kevin Carlin	John Richards	14 March 2012
