= Wil Anderson =

Australian comedian (born 1974)

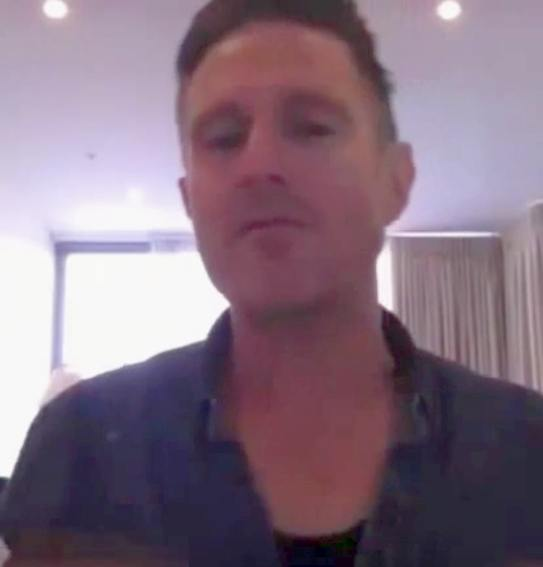
- Born: William James Anderson; January 31, 1974 (age 52); Heyfield, Victoria, Australia
- Education: University of Canberra (1995, journalism)
- Occupation: Comedian
- Website: wilanderson.com

William James Anderson (born 31 January 1974) is an Australian comedian, writer, presenter, and podcaster.

== Early life ==
William James Anderson was born on 31 January 1974 in Sale, Victoria, and grew up on a dairy farm near Heyfield, Victoria. He attended Gippsland Grammar School in Sale, and later studied newspaper journalism at the University of Canberra, graduating top of his class in 1995. He is the cousin of former AFL footballer Stuart Anderson.

== Career ==
=== Media ===
Anderson has appeared on Good News Week, Under Melbourne Tonight, What's Goin' On There?, The Project, and Have You Been Paying Attention?

From 2000 to 2004, Anderson co-hosted the triple j breakfast radio show with Adam Spencer. Between 2001 and 2006, Anderson hosted the comedy talk-show The Glass House, broadcast on ABC, alongside Corinne Grant and Dave Hughes. In November 2006, the show was cancelled amid media speculation that the cancellation was made due to pressure from the Howard Government. Howard responded with, "I do not tell the ABC what programmes it should run. I respect the independence of the ABC." In 2007, Anderson was nominated in the "Most Popular Presenter" category at the Logie Awards for his role on the show.

Anderson was the subject of controversy after he made jokes about the late father of Australian Idol finalist Shannon Noll at the 2006 Melbourne International Comedy Festival.

From April 2007 to November 2008, Anderson joined with Lehmo to host Wil & Lehmo, an afternoon drive-time radio program on Triple M. He also replaced Mick Molloy as co-host of the station's Hot Breakfast early morning show alongside Luke Darcy and Eddie McGuire in 2018, leaving the show at the end of 2019.

In May 2008, Anderson became the executive producer and host of The Gruen Transfer, a panel talk show about advertising televised on ABC. The show debuted with a record-breaking audience of 1.287 million viewers, the highest-rating debut entertainment program in the history of the ABC.

Anderson started hosting Question Everything on ABC in 2021.

In 2024 Anderson was a contestant on the second season of Taskmaster Australia.

=== Standup comedy ===
While Anderson's television and radio career has made him a recognised figure in Australia, standup comedy remains his foremost discipline. Anderson started his career in newspaper journalism before venturing into standup comedy. In his early career, Anderson made numerous appearances on Good News Week, on both the original and revamped versions. On 19 June 1996, Anderson appeared as the guest comedian on the RMITV Show Under Melbourne Tonight, and appeared with RMITV again on the Under Melbourne Tonight spin-off What's Goin' On There? on 3 June 1998.

==== Live shows ====
Anderson has performed at numerous festivals, including Just For Laughs in Montreal. For over a decade Anderson has started every live show with the opening riff from "Back In Black" as a tribute to his late friend, comedian Dave Grant. Since 1997, he has used a pun regarding his first name for the title of his live shows:

- Wilegitimate (2024)
- Wiluminate (2022–2023)
- Wilogical (2022)
- Whatchu Talkin' 'Bout WIL? (2020)
- Wil-Informed (2019–2020)
- Wilegal (2018, 2020)
- Critically Wil (2017)
- Fire at Wil (2016)
- Free Wil (2015)
- Political Wil (2015)
- What You Talking 'bout Wil? (2015)
- Wiluminati (2014)
- Goodwil (2013)
- Wilarious (2012)
- Man vs Wil (2011)
- Wilful Misconduct (2010)
- Wilosophy (2009)
- BeWILdered (2008)
- Wil of God (2007)
- Wil Communication (2006)
- Kill Wil (2005)
- Licence to Wil (2004)
- Jagged Little Wil (2003)
- Wil By Mouth (2002)
- Wil of Fortune (2001)
- Who Wants To Be A Wilionaire (2000)
- Willenium and Terra Wilius (1999)
- I am the Wilrus (1998, 2006 Edinburgh Fringe)
- Diet Life (1997)
- Show Pony (a 10-week season with Corinne Grant)

=== Podcasts ===
Anderson has created a number of podcasts, including TOFOP, a comedy podcast with friend and actor Charlie Clausen; FOFOP, where he chats with "Guest Charlies" in lieu of Clausen; Wilosophy, where he interviews guests about their life philosophies; and 2 Guys 1 Cup, an Australian rules football podcast with Clausen. He has also expressed interest in starting a Survivor recap podcast entitled Outwil, Outplay, Outlast.

TOFOP (Thirty Odd Foot of Pod) debuted in 2010 as a weekly podcast in which Anderson and Clausen discussed a variety of subjects, including film, popular culture, sport, personal anecdotes, and detailed discussions on bizarre hypothetical situations. Following significant media coverage in June 2012, TOFOP rose to become the most popular comedy podcast in Australia. In September 2012, the podcast was placed on hiatus as a result of Clausen gaining a starring role as Zac MacGuire in popular Australian soap opera Home and Away. The podcast resumed in June 2014. In February 2013, Anderson launched the spin-off podcast FOFOP.

Anderson launched his Wilosophy podcast in December 2014. The inaugural episode featured Todd Sampson, while subsequent guests include Judith Lucy, John Safran, Felicity Ward, Osher Günsberg, Jarrod McKenna, Annabel Crabb, Marc Maron, Dee Madigan, Nazeem Hussain, Corinne Grant, Namila Benson and Karl Kruszelnicki. Wilosphy has, over the second half of 2018, released compilation episodes with themes such as religion, comedy and mental health. These episodes take clips from past Wilosophy episodes and compile them based on subject matter.

In a January 2015 episode of podcast TOFOP, Anderson recalled his first Logie Awards ceremony, held in 2008, when he garnered controversy for his live tweets from the event. Anderson explained that he has never been a fan of the event, as he believes that a large number of other causes for celebration exist in Australia that never receive the recognition they deserve.

In 2020, he was a guest on the podcast The West Wing Thing. Wil is also a frequent guest on The Dollop with Dave Anthony and Gareth Reynolds, having appeared in 26 episodes as of October, 2024.

=== Books ===
In 2006, Anderson published his first book: Survival of the Dumbest, a comedic collection of rants and observations drawn largely from his 'Sunday Roast' columns in the Sunday Telegraph and Sunday Herald-Sun. This was followed by a similar book, Friendly Fire, in 2009. In 2022, Anderson published I Am NOT Fine, Thanks, a political memoir and comedic reflection upon the preceding years, largely consisting of the same material as his 2022 show, Wilogical.

== Personal life ==
Anderson was born in Sale, Victoria, and grew up on a dairy farm near Heyfield, Victoria. He attended Gippsland Grammar School in Sale, and later studied journalism at the University of Canberra.

Between 2011 and 2017, Anderson split his time between Australia and the U.S. He has a form of osteoarthritis, which he mentions in some of his performances.

Anderson is a passionate supporter and longtime fan club member of the Western Bulldogs, who compete in the Australian Football League. Anderson was named as a club ambassador for the 2014 season.

In September 2023, Anderson appeared on The Project to give his support for the "Yes" vote in the 2023 Australian Indigenous Voice referendum; Anderson was particularly critical of the "No" campaign's "underhanded strategy of appealing to ignorance".

== Awards ==
=== 2017 ===
- Winner: Melbourne International Comedy Festival (MICF), Critically Wil "People’s Choice" (shared with Judith Lucy and Denise Scott)

=== 2016 ===
- Winner: Most Outstanding Entertainment program, Gruen "58th TV Week Logie Awards"

=== 2015 ===
- Winner: Melbourne International Comedy Festival (MICF), Free Wil "People’s Choice"

=== 2014 ===
- Winner: Melbourne International Comedy Festival (MICF), Wiluminati "People’s Choice"

=== 2012 ===
- Winner: Melbourne International Comedy Festival (MICF), Wilarious "People’s Choice"

=== 2011 ===
- Winner: Melbourne International Comedy Festival (MICF), Man vs Wil "People’s Choice"
- Winner: GQ Man of the Year, "Media Performer of the Year"
- Winner: AACTA Awards, The Gruen Transfer, "Best Light Entertainment Series"

=== 2010 ===
- Winner: Helpmann Award for Best Comedy Performer "Wilful Misconduct"
- Winner: Melbourne International Comedy Festival (MICF), Wilful Misconduct "People’s Choice"
- Nominee: Barry Award MICF, Wilful Misconduct "Best Show"
- Nominee: Gold Logie, The Gruen Transfer, "Most Popular Personality"
- Winner: GQ Man of the Year, "Media Performer of the Year"
- Winner: AFI Award, The Gruen Transfer "Best Light Entertainment" (Hosted by Anderson)
- Winner: Couch Potato Awards, Gruen Nation "Best Light Entertainment" (Hosted by Anderson)

=== 2009 ===
- Nominee: AFI Award, The Gruen Transfer "Best Light Entertainment" (Hosted by Anderson)
- Winner: Couch Potato Awards, The Gruen Transfer "Best Light Entertainment" (Hosted by Anderson)

=== 2008 ===
- Winner: GQ Man of the Year "Comedic Talent"
- Nominee: GQ Man of the Year "Radio Presenter"
- Nominee: GQ Man of the Year "TV Presenter"
- Nominee: Australian Commercial Radio Awards "Best New Talent"
- Nominee: Aust Commercial Radio Awards "Best Sketch"
- Nominee: Logie Award, The Gruen Transfer, "Best Light Entertainment" (Hosted by Anderson)

== Recordings ==
- 2015 DVD - Wiluminati released through Universal
- 2009 DVD – Wilosophy released through Universal
- 2009 DVD – The Gruen Transfer: Season 2 released through ABC Enterprises
- 2008 DVD – The Gruen Transfer: Season 1 released through ABC Enterprises
- 2007 DVD – MICF: Best of Gala Collection
- 2006 DVD – Release of The Best of The Glass House (2002–2006) by ABC Enterprises and distributed through Roadshow Entertainment
- 2001 CD – Release of the Melbourne Comedy Festival CD compilation through Rubber Music, distributed by BMG Australia
