= Under the Milky Way (TV series) =

- Opening theme: "Under the Milky Way" by Damon Smith
- Country of origin: Australia
- No. of episodes: 6

Production
- Running time: 30 mins (approx)

Original release
- Network: Channel 31
- Release: 8 August – 19 September 2016

Under the Milky Way is an Australian television comedy series which first screened on community television in 2016. The series was also released as a movie in 2017.

== Plot ==
Helene McKenzie is an avid astronomer in the observatory that overlooks the New South Wales regional town of Coonabarabran. Helene and her team of misfit colleagues actively fights its closure when a nearby and much newer observatory threatens its funding and research grant.

== Cast ==
- Lee McClenaghan as Helene McKenzie
- Matt Stewart as Steven Eggbird
- Tom McCathie as William 'Wild Bill' Sadie
- Marty Rhone as Harry Rosenfeldt
- Kirsty Snowden as Leslie Browning
- Mark Gambino as Simon Redding
- Bryce Hardy as Mike Finch
- Rowan Francis as Mayor Darryl Barnham
- Sophie Cusworth as Halle Smith
- Davini Malcolm as Ronny McKenzie
- Kate Dehnert as Aileen
- Rob Sitch as Sam McKenzie

== Awards ==
=== Antenna Awards ===
Year	Nominee / work	Award	Result
2019	Lee McClenaghan	Best Actor in a Narrative Drama, Comedy or Sketch	Won
2019	Under the Milky Way	Outstanding Theme Song in a Program	Won
2019	Under the Milky Way	Outstanding Creative Achievement in a Program	Nominated
2019	Under the Milky Way	Best Narrative and/or Fictional Program	Nominated

== See also ==
- Leongatha
