= 1700 (TV series) =

- Also known as: SYN 1700
- Created by: SYN Media
- Presented by: Various
- Country of origin: Australia
- Original language: English
- No. of seasons: 11 (original); 4 (reboot)

Production
- Executive producers: Imi Vassallo and Liz Fouldes
- Production location: Melbourne
- Running time: 60mins (Including sponsorships)
- Production companies: SYN TV; RMITV

Original release
- Network: C31 Melbourne
- Release: May 2006 – present

1700 is an Australian music video show broadcast in Melbourne and Geelong. It initially ran from 2011 to 2021, airing on C31 Melbourne & Geelong. It was rebooted in 2022 after a hiatus.

== History ==
In 2016, 1700 was airing on C31 Melbourne & Geelong on Wednesday and Friday afternoons from 5 pm.

Notable former guests include SAFIA, The 1975, and You Me at Six. The programme has previously covered festivals and events such as BIGSOUND, Groovin' the Moo, and The Falls Festival.

During the COVID-19 pandemic, the series moved from the C31 studios to remote recording over Zoom. In 2022, a soft reboot of the series was started in collaboration with RMITV, which now utilises their TV studios and crew.

== Production and description ==
Produced by SYN TV, the show features various recurring hosts introducing music videos, conducting interviews and performances from local and international artists, and is billed as "Melbourne's only daily live, youth produced music show".

== Awards ==
=== Antenna Awards ===
Year	Nominee / work	Award	Result
2009	1700	Outstanding Young Persons Program	Won
2014	1700	Outstanding Young Persons Program	Nominated
2019	1700	Best Music Program	Nominated

== See also ==
- List of Australian music television shows
- List of Australian television series
