= Cologne Comedy Festival =

Annual comedy festival in Cologne, Germany

Coordinates: 50.9399°N 6.9344°E

The Cologne Comedy Festival is an international comedy festival held in Cologne, Germany, every year since 1991. It was founded by Achim Rohde in 1990 in Kleve. The festival initially started by importing comedians from around the world. During the 1990s, stand-up comedy became popular with young German audiences, who had experienced it whilst living outside Germany. This led to home-grown comedy acts, which in turn caused the growth of the festival until its present size, where stars of German and of international comedy perform in more than 20 sold-out venues, ranging from small clubs to large theatres. Many German comedy acts were discovered at this festival.

== Awards ==
Since 1997, the Cologne Comedy Festival awards the annual German Comedy Prize. Its categories are:

- Best comedy show
- Best comedy series
- Best sketch show
- Best comedy improvement
- Best actor/actress
- Best newcomer
- Best comedian
- Best comedienne
- Best film comedy
- Honorary prize

== Offshoots ==
Since 2007, the Comedy Festival runs in tandem with a Comedy Film Festival.

== See also ==
- Hollywood's Comedy Nights
