= Adam Richard =

Australian comedian

- Born: 10 January 1971 (age 55); Carlton, Victoria, Australia
- Education: Professional Writing and Editing at RMIT University
- Occupations: Comedian; actor; radio presenter; writer; media personality

Adam Richard (born Adam Richard Dellamarta, 1 January 1971 in Carlton, Victoria) is an Australian comedian, actor, radio presenter, writer and media personality, best known co-writing and starring in Outland, an ABC1 comedy series about a group of LGBT sci-fi geeks. Richard was also a team captain on the 2014 revival of music quiz and live music performance show Spicks and Specks, and he was a permanent panel member on the Doctor Who–themed 2017 show Whovians.

== Career ==
After a variety of part-time jobs, including working as a State Bank teller, a fast-food worker, and a cleaner, Richard had his first stand-up gig in 1996. During the late 1990s, Richard was a regular on various RMITV shows, including The Loft Live with Rove McManus, Under Melbourne Tonight, What's Goin' On There? (1998) and Whose Shout (1999).

He had a regular gossip segment on Triple J radio in 2002–2003, where he was known as Mister Bitch. He presented a similar segment on The Matt and Jo Show on Fox FM from 2003 until the show's completion in 2013.

On television, he has made regular appearances on Rove, 9am with David & Kim, and Spicks and Specks. He also appeared on The Glass House. In 2007, he was also a regular on the show Celebrity Dog School with his dog, Snoops. He had a guest acting role in 2010 on Sleuth 101, and he appeared in Celebrity Splash! in 2013.

He co-wrote and starred in the ABC1 comedy series Outland in 2012.

Richard was one of the team captains in the revival of the ABC television show Spicks and Specks that commenced on 5 February 2014. From 2017 to 2020, Richard was a regular panelist on Whovians, an Australian talk show hosted by Rove McManus that aired on ABC, providing discussion and analysis of Doctor Who episodes. In a 2023 interview, Richard reflected on his time on Whovians, describing it as a unique experience, albeit with challenges. He recalled receiving advance episodes of Doctor Who with unfinished visual effects and large watermarks of his own name, making the viewing experience difficult.

Since 2001, Richard has (along with Scott Brennan and Toby Sullivan) been one-third of comedy group Talking Poofy, and their podcast The Poofcast has been running since 2010.

Since 2019, Richard has been producing content on his Adam Richard Has a Theory podcast.

== Personal life ==
Richard was born Adam Richard Dellamarta but informally changed his name to Adam Richard when he was a teenager. He officially changed it in 1996 after the death of his mother. He attended Brunswick Primary School and Princes Hill Secondary College in Carlton North, Victoria. He also completed a writing course at RMIT University. He is openly gay and has been billed as the country's first openly gay comedian. He has also revealed he suffers from debilitating panic attacks but is able to get it under control with assistance.
