= Hayman Kent =

- Born: Hayman Kent; 3 May
- Education: Bachelor of Music, Music Performance University of Melbourne
- Occupations: Comedian; Television & radio personality Singer; Actress; Writer
- Known for: Live on Bowen (2013 – present)

Hayman Kent (born 3 May ?) is an Australian comedian, TV and radio personality, singer, actress and writer. She is currently a co-host on the RMITV flagship production Live on Bowen. While studying a Bachelor of Music at university, Kent tried her hand at stand-up comedy and soon appeared in Raw Comedy 2012 and made it into the National finals top 12 at age 21.
