= Craig Annis =

Australian radio and television personality

- Born: 10 May 1983 (age 43)
- Occupations: Television presenter Radio presenter Comedian; Writer
- Known for: Live on Bowen 2012 TV variety show Stefan & Craig Radio Show; Stefan and Craig Slightly Live TV variety show

Craig Annis (born 10 May 1983) is an Australian radio and television personality. He hosts the breakfast show Craig & Mandy with Mandy Coolen from 5.30 am till 9 am on The Central Coast's Star 104.5. He was a Roving Reporter on Live on Bowen with longtime comedy partner Stefan Taylor with whom he had a Triple M Brisbane show with called Stefan & Craig and an RMITV show called Stefan and Craig Slightly Live. Annis was also a radio presenter on SAFM.
