= Andy Murphy =

English footballer (born 1966)

Personal information
- Full name: Andrew Colin Murphy
- Date of birth: 18 October 1966 (age 60)
- Place of birth: Preston, England
- Position: Midfielder

Senior career*
Years	Team	Apps	(Gls)
1983–1985	Preston North End	10	(0)
- * Club domestic league appearances and goals

Andrew Colin Murphy (born 18 October 1966) is an English former professional footballer who played in the Football League as a midfielder.
