= The Glass House (2001 TV series) =

2001–2006 Australian TV comedy series

- DVD cover of The Best of The Glass House.
- Starring: Wil Anderson; Corinne Grant; Dave Hughes
- Country of origin: Australia
- No. of episodes: 218

Production
- Camera setup: Multiple-camera setup
- Running time: 28 minutes
- Production company: GNWTV

Original release
- Network: ABC TV
- Release: 10 August 2001 – 29 November 2006

The Glass House is a half-hour Australian comedy talk show which screened on the ABC from 2001 to 2006.

It was hosted by stand-up comedian Wil Anderson, and co-hosted by fellow television and radio comedians Corinne Grant and Dave Hughes. Two additional guests joined the regular cast each week, including musicians, politicians, actors, radio personalities and other celebrities of varying calibre, such as Young Australian of the Year winners and Olympic athletes. Regular guests included comedians Adam Spencer and Akmal Saleh, netballer Liz Ellis, Play School host Rhys Muldoon, musician Pinky Beecroft, and music critic Molly Meldrum. The show thrived on taking regular shots at, among others, Shannon Noll, Amanda Vanstone, Naomi Robson, Shane Warne and Peter Costello. The format of the programme is similar to that of the BBC series, Have I Got News for You.

The show was pre-recorded in front of a live audience in the ABC's Sydney studio on Tuesday evenings. During the Melbourne International Comedy Festival, the show was taped inside the Melbourne Town Hall. The program initially screened on Friday nights, but suffered from an inconsistent timeslot, resulting in humorous TV spots, for example 9:30 Friday...probably. In 2005, The Glass House shifted to a more reliable timeslot on Wednesday at 9:35pm.

The show was recognised by the AFI Awards in 2005, winning Best Light Entertainment in the Television category, and beating long-time rival and ABC stablemate Enough Rope. Also in 2005, The Glass House was voted Most Under Acknowledged TV Show in one of the categories for the satirical TV Fugly Awards.

== Segments ==
The show opened with "Ahead in The Glass House...", where an (unseen) upcoming segment is announced followed by a few seconds of out-of-context news footage, usually taken from an interview of an Australian political figure.

The main part of the show began with Anderson seated on steps at the front of the stage, who begins with "Welcome to the Glass House, the program that asks the question...", the question concerning an event from the past week. Anderson will then joke about one to four unusual stories and introduce Corinne Grant, who enters from the camera left. Grant starts off with a pun on Anderson's name and performs a similar, but shorter monologue. Anderson then introduced Dave Hughes who enters from the camera right, and usually begins with "This week I'm..." and followed by an emotion, usually 'angry', ad-libbing his concerns. The two guests are announced and greeted by Anderson while the panel assembles at the boomerang-shaped table.

Regular segments included:

- Movers and Shakers, concerning stories about unusual trendsetters or pioneers. Anderson will read from teleprompter a short monologue concerning each story, then throw it open to one of the guests, Hughes or Grant for discussion. There are usually three of these, taking up about half the show.
- Later in The Glass House, a short sequence filmed in the same style as the opening, with the voice-over beginning with "Later in The Glass House".
- Second Rate Media Watch. A play on the ABC's serious Media Watch program. This segment is similar in structure to Movers and Shakers. However, the story discussed is one that has appeared on a television, radio or internet medium, instead of Movers and Shakers' newspaper articles.
- Question on the Glass House. Shows footage of Hughes in the theatre lobby before the show, getting vox pops from the studio audience before the show, normally using a simple one line question. Some participants answer seriously, others not so seriously, and others try to hide.
- Interview with Hughesy. A continuation of Questions on the Glass House, in this segment Anderson introduces a single story related to the questions previously asked, after which Hughes is asked to help by roleplaying a significant newsmaker from the story. Donning an often ridiculous hat or costume prop, Hughes then has to answer questions from the other panelists.

Other segments:

- Rogues' Gallery. Here, the panelists examine and make fun of interesting or funny photos from the week's media.
- Contact with the Great Unwashed. Anderson takes a microphone into the audience to ask them to suggest a recent event for the panel to discuss.

Closing segments: The show ends with two segments performed by Anderson:

- The Trophy. Anderson announces the end of the show with the line "Yes, it's time to award the coveted Glass House trophy, which this week is called..." followed with a short animation of a humorous plaque (often alliterative or a tongue twister). The winner is the person or thing responsible for the news item. The trophy is golden figure holding an umbrella, to protect him from shattering glass. The trophy was originally known as "The Golden Shier", a pun on Jonathan Shier, then responsible for running the ABC, giving an alternate purpose for the trophy's umbrella. The umbrella has been broken off at least twice during a show recording, although only the first occasion made it to air.
- Tomorrow's Headlines. A newspaper headline for the week is shown (and read), followed by a humorous sub-heading.

== Cancellation ==
On 31 October 2006, the ABC announced the program was cancelled and the final episode of the series would go to air on 29 November 2006 as a one-hour special. Anderson mentioned on the show that they may look at Network Ten as a possible home for the show in the future.

The ABC decision generated public interest, with suggestions the decision may have been politically motivated. Dave Hughes stated that "We have had our best ratings ever,".

The cancellation occurred in the same year as the ABC's decision not to publish the biography of Alan Jones and followed revelations the ABC had begun a new investigation into bias in its programs. The decision occurred one day after NSW senator Concetta Fierravanti-Wells told ABC executives under their questioning that co-host Corinne Grant had been guilty of a serious conflict of interest because she was the public face of the ACTU's workplace relations campaign.

Numerous online groups and petitions were created in an attempt to keep the show on air. Although the move came in the middle of federal government attempts to force changes in the management and policies of the ABC to remove perceived bias, then Prime Minister John Howard said he did not ask the ABC Board to axe the show.

The final episode was ranked the week's 10th most watched show nationally with 1.15 million viewers, which also provided the highest ever ratings for The Glass House.

== See also ==
- List of Australian television series
