= Tony Biggs =

Australian television presenter

Tony Biggs began his broadcasting career in the early 1980s in Brisbane on 4ZZZ. He later moved to Sydney, where he hosted a show on JJJ, an Australian youth radio station. In the 1990s Tony moved to Melbourne, appearing on radio 3RRR where he presented 'On the Blower' a talk-back discussion show. In the late 1990s Tony appeared on RMITV Under Melbourne Tonight, a show on public television Channel 31. Tony Biggs has been the drummer in bands such as The Black Assassins, Never Again (Mark Gee on Bass), Hell To Pay (Ian and Cathy from X with Spencer P. Jones), The Outer Limits (who opened in Brisbane for Iggy Pop on his 1983 Australian Tour with the New Christs), The Fuck Fucks and The Love Addicts.
