= Corinne Grant =

Australian comedian and television presenter

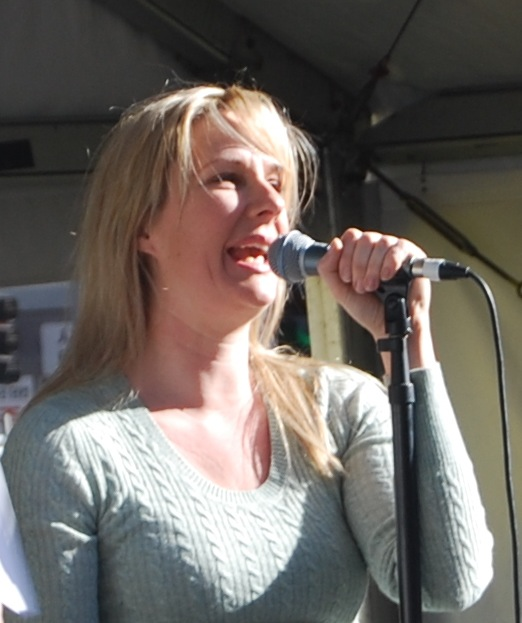
- Occupations: Lawyer; Comedian; Television presenter
- Years active: 1993−present
- Spouse: Christos Bouras
- Children: 2
- Website: corinnegrant.com.au

Corinne Grant is an Australian lawyer, comedian and television presenter.

== Career ==
After briefly studying as a nurse in Wodonga, Grant started her career as an actor in Melbourne, obtaining a degree in drama. After graduating, she started doing stand-up comedy to overcome her stage fright. Her first major show was as a support act for Merrick Watts. She performed her first solo stand-up show in the bar of the Victoria Hotel in the early 1990s. From 1995 onwards, she appeared on the community television station Channel 31 as a regular on RMITV's Under Melbourne Tonight hosted by Stephen Hall.

In 1999, Grant became a member of the talk show Rove Live which aired on Channel Ten. She remained on the show until 2005. She co-hosted the comedy show The Glass House (which aired on ABC-TV) with Wil Anderson and Dave Hughes from 2001 until it was axed in 2006. In 2006, she hosted two episodes while Anderson was performing at the Edinburgh Fringe festival. She also appeared on the sketch comedy series skitHOUSE (on Channel Ten) from 2003 until its axing in 2004, so she was concurrently starring in three TV programs.

In 2005, Grant appeared alongside Greg Fleet, Adam Hills, Alan Brough and Steven Gates in Die on your Feet, a play written by Greg Fleet. She returned to stand-up after a five-year break in 2006, appearing at the Melbourne International Comedy Festival Gala and in her own solo show, Faking It. She later performed at the Edinburgh Fringe Festival with a show titled Nice Friendly Lady Hour. She has written articles for newspapers such as the Herald Sun and The Age. In 2007, she toured with a show called Have My Stuff and briefly worked in radio on Mix 101.1 with comedian Tom Gleeson on The Saturday Show in Melbourne and Sydney.

Grant narrated the factual television series Air Ways.

As of 2010, Grant was a spokesperson for Progressive Direct Car Insurance.

In February 2013, Grant commenced graduate studies for the Juris Doctor degree at the Melbourne Law School (University of Melbourne). She was admitted to practice in April 2017, and commenced work with a law firm in Geelong.

== Political involvement ==
In 2010, she joined the Labor Party, pitching to voters at the Victorian election in a YouTube series called "Labor TV". In 2018, Grant endorsed the Victorian Socialists for the 2018 Victorian state election.

== Personal life ==
Grant is married to lawyer Christos Bouras, and has a daughter and step son.

== Bibliography ==
=== Contributed chapter ===
- "A letter to feminists from a man who knows better", pp. 198–205, in: Destroying the joint, edited by Jane Caro, Read How You Want (2015, ISBN 9781459687295).
