= Pommy Johnson =

Australian comedian

Pommy Johnson is a comedian from Australia who is best known for performing his parody song "Psycho Chicken" while wearing a rubber glove on his head on the Australian television program Hey Hey It's Saturday. He won as the Maurie Awards Australian comedian of the Year 2002, held at the Comic Lounge. He appeared on the RMITV show Under Melbourne Tonight on 10 April 1996.

== Standup Comedy ==
- Pommy Johnson - Live at the Comedy Club, Melbourne (DVD, 2004)
