= Hound TV =

Australian television show

- Genre: Dog shows
- Created by: Steven Pam
- Presented by: Steven Pam
- Country of origin: Australia
- Original language: English
- No. of seasons: 3

Production
- Production location: Melbourne
- Cinematography: Matt Tynan

Original release
- Network: Channel 31 (2006 - present)
- Release: 2006

Hound TV is an Australian television show about dogs hosted by Steven Pam. The show is currently broadcasting on Australian Community Television Stations.

== History ==
The show was started by Steven Pam as a video podcast in early 2006. Steven's friend, Matt Tynan later joined in for episode 2 and has stuck around ever since and they produced nearly 30 episodes until they were finally noticed by Melbourne's community TV station, Channel 31.

== Seasons ==
Hound TV has produced three seasons airing on community TV in Melbourne, Sydney and Adelaide; and is currently on its third season. Most, if not all, of the stories from the TV show will eventually make their way to their official podcast.

== DVD release ==
Season 1 of Hound TV has been released on DVD which contains all eleven episodes of season 1 plus a special behind-the-scenes interview with host, Steven Pam and cameraman, Matt Tynan.

== See also ==
- Scent hound
