= Under Melbourne Tonight =

1993 Australian variety TV series

- Directed by: Steve Messenger, Nicholas Bufalo, Dan Flett, Jacinta Hicken
- Presented by: Stephen Hall (Host); Vin "Rastas" Hedger (Host)
- Country of origin: Australia
- Original language: English

Production
- Executive producers: Jill Harris, Dan Flett, Emma Travers, Liam O' Hara
- Production locations: RMIT University; Melbourne, Australia
- Running time: Approx. 60 min. (Including commercials)
- Production company: RMITV (Student Community Television Inc.)

Original release
- Network: C31 Melbourne
- Release: 1993

Related
- The World's Not Round; What's Goin' On There? (1998)

Under Melbourne Tonight is a weekly live variety hour television program produced by RMITV that broadcast on C31 Melbourne in 1993. Reaching a weekly viewership of 55,000 people each week, the show was reviewed in The Age's Green Guide by Jim Schembri on 22 December 1994 as "Sometimes funnier than Letterman". Under Melbourne Tonight was hosted by Stephen Hall and Vin "Rastas" Hedger and featured regular segments with 3RRR's Tony Biggs, Merrick and Rosso's Merrick Watts and Tim Ross, Corinne Grant, Peter Helliar and many more. The show included segments ranging from live music, stand-up comedy, movie reviews, music reviews, video game reviews, sports, news, current affairs, science and sketches. In 1998 the show was rebooted as Under Melbourne Tonight Presents...... What's Goin' On There? and Whose Shout at the Stumpy Arms in 1999.

== Guests ==
Musical guests included Lecher Purvy, Cosmic Psychos Weddings Parties Anything, TISM, Pray TV, The Avalanches, The Lucksmiths, Penelope Swales and many more. Stand-up comedy guests included Marty Sheargold, Dave O'Neil, Bruno Lucia, Pommy Johnson, Wil Anderson, Rove McManus, Alan Brough, Dave Hughes and many more.

== Cast ==
Presenter	Role	Tenure
Stephen Hall	Host	
Vin "Rastas" Hedger	Host	
Tony Biggs	Supporting cast	
Rosso	Supporting cast	
Merrick Watts	Supporting cast	
Corinne Grant	Supporting cast	
Peter Helliar	Supporting cast	
James Young	Supporting cast	
Chris Pearson	Supporting cast	
Dr Andi	Supporting cast	
Duncan MacKew	Supporting cast	
Steve Polak	Supporting cast	
Carlos Raven	Supporting cast	
Andrew Young	Supporting cast	
Kealy Smith	Supporting cast	
Jason Elliott	Supporting cast	
Mel Northrop	Supporting cast	
Jenny Connely	Supporting cast	
Al Parkes	Supporting cast	
Liam O'Hara	Supporting cast	
Andrea Ho	Voice Over Artist	
