= Learn Local =

Learn Local Education and Training
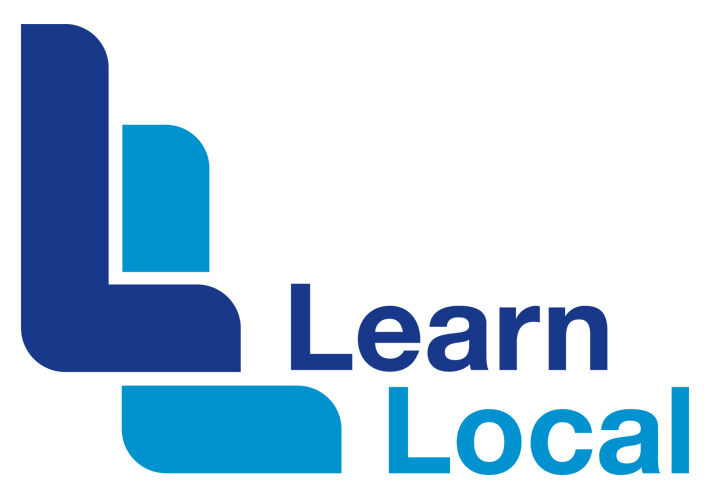
- Victoria, Australia

Information
- Number of learners: 29,000+ per year
- Number of organisations: 200+
- Funded by: Adult and Community Further Education (ACFE) Board
- Website: www.learnlocal.org.au

Learn Locals are organisations in Victoria, Australia whose members deliver pre-accredited training and other education programs in community settings. They are independent and not-for-profit organisations that are run by a board and management team. To be a Learn Local provider, an organisation must be registered with the Adult, Community and Further Education (ACFE) Board. The ACFE Board is a statutory authority under the Education and Training Reform Act 2006.

There are over 200 Learn Local providers across regional, rural and metropolitan Victoria. Every year, over 29,000 Victorians undertake government subsidised education and training programs through registered Learn Local providers.

Learn Local providers are funded by the ACFE Board to deliver pre-accredited and other programs. Pre-accredited training builds skills for further study or to get a job.

== History ==
Since 2011, Learn Local providers that are registered and funded by the ACFE Board to deliver pre-accredited training and other programs are known in Victoria as the Learn Local sector.

Learn Local providers are part of the broader adult and community education sector, which had its origins in the Mechanics Institutes established in the 1840s and the Centre for Adult Education, which was established in 1947. In the 1970s and 1980s, Neighbourhood houses and learning centres began to offer learning programs for their communities. The majority originated out of the women’s movement and were staffed by and run for women. Many of these Neighbourhood houses and community centres are now also Learn Local providers.

== Funding ==
Learn Local providers are funded by the ACFE Board on behalf of the Victorian Government to deliver pre-accredited training.

== See also ==
- Vocational education
- Lifelong learning
- Community education
- City of Knox
- City of Greater Dandenong
- Adult education
- Education in Victoria
- Registered training organisation
- E-learning
