= Fred Negro =

Australian satirist, musician, and cartoonist (born 1959)

- Born: Frederick John Negro; 1959 (age 66–67); Richmond, Victoria, Australia
- Genres: Rock, punk, country
- Occupations: Musician, songwriter, satirist, cartoonist
- Instruments: Vocals, drums
- Years active: 1979–present
- Label: Man Made
- Website: myspace.com/frednegro

Frederick John Negro (born 1959) is an Australian satirist, musician, songwriter, and cartoonist. He has fronted numerous rock, punk and country bands.

== Biography ==
Frederick John Negro was born in 1959 and grew up in Richmond. In 1979 Negro formed a post-punk group, The Editions, on drums with Roz Dear on vocals, John Durr on guitar and David Yob Hoban on bass guitar. By the following year Dear was replaced by Sherine Abeyratne on vocals. From 1981 to 1982 they issued three cassette albums, Aggression, Recession and Obsession, on their own label, Orgasm Records.

Negro left The Editions in 1983 to form punk rockers, I Spit on Your Gravy on vocals and drums. Initial line up included Jason "The Big J" Banner (Australia's 8th best guitarist) on guitar, David Yob Hoban on bass guitar, and Scotti "Stix" Simpson on vocals and drums. Australian musicologist, Ian McFarlane, described their early performances as "shambolic, drunken affairs, replete with on-stage brawls and members barely able to stand upright, let alone play their instruments". Negro was often "dropping his pants in public" and would deliver "other on-stage obscenities".

In February 1985 the group issued their debut six-track extended play, St Kilda's Alright, which they co-produced with Paul Elliott for Man Made Records at York Street Studios. It included a ten-page booklet, "Suck This Fred Nile", that local police declared was "obscene" and confiscated all available copies due to Negro's "debauched" cartoons and photocopied pornographic images. As for the music itself, McFarlane declares it was "desperately inept and sounded like it had been recorded at the bottom of a dam".

Also in 1985 Phil "Grizzly" Miles joined I Spit on Your Gravy on rhythm guitar and vocals. They issued a studio album, Fruit Loop City, in June 1987, which was co-produced by Miles and Peter "Poyt" Walker for Virgin Records. They disbanded in the next year, Negro and Miles promptly formed Gravybillies, as a country music, spoof band.

Late in 1987 Negro and Miles formed a rock group, The Band Who Shot Liberty Valance, with Phil "Good-One" Bryant on drums and Trevor Pennington on bass guitar (both ex-Corpse Grinders); and Terry Fosters on harmonica. McFarlane described this group as "lager louts [who] were the ultimate charmless, inner-city party band". In October 1988 they issued an album, Outlaw Death Lager Drinkers from Hell, on Virgin Records. This group broke up in 1989; Negro and Fosters formed The Brady Bunch Lawnmower Massacre, which "continued the drunken hillbilly theme". The line up included Paul Barnett on bass guitar, Garry Mansfield on guitar; and former bandmate, Simpson on drums.

- Shonkytonk (vocals)
- The Fuck Fucks (vocals)
- Squirming Gerbil Death (vocals)
- The Twits (vocals)
- They Might Be Negroes (vocals)
- The Eggs (vocals)
- 57 Pages of Pink (vocals)
- The BlackMolls (vocals)
- Little Freddie and the Pops (vocals)

In 1988 he formed The Brady Bunch Lawnmower Massacre, a country-punk fusion group with Garry Mansfield (guitar), Paul Barnett (bass), Scotty Simpson (drums) and Terry Foster (guitar, harmonica); they disbanded in 1993. Punk-influenced I Spit on Your Gravy had also disbanded by the end of the 1980s but Fred has maintained a significant underground presence in Melbourne, Australia with regular appearances in his other bands, and today contributes a weekly 'Pub Strip' to the Melbourne street press, and until major renovation in 2009 MC'd the long running karaoke night at the Greyhound Hotel, St Kilda, Victoria.

== Discography ==
=== Albums ===
- I Spit on Your Gravy, Fruit Loop City LP (Virgin Records, 1987)
- The Band Who Shot Liberty Valance, Outlaw Death Lager Drinkers From Hell LP (Virgin Records, 1988; rereleased on CD by Turkeyneck Records, 2008)
- The Brady Bunch Lawnmower Massacre, Desperate Football LP/CD (Shagpile Records/Shock Records, 1992)
- The Fuck Fucks, ...Here CD (Shock Records, 1997)
- The Fuck Fucks, Millennium Buggery CD (I Envy Us Records, 1998)
- Shonkytonk, I Can't Believe It's Not Butter CD (Shonkytonk Record Company, 1998)
- The Twits (without Fred), Albert Road CD recorded at The Espy on 30 June and 32nd (1999)
- The Twits, The Twits Play Music CD (Pure Pop Records, 2002)
- The Twits, She May Look Clean, But...You Can't Beat The Axis If You Get VD CD (Pure Pop Records/Inertia, 2005)

=== EPs ===
- I Spit on Your Gravy, St Kilda's Alright! 12" EP (Man Made Records, 1984; rereleased on Polyester Records in 1989)
- The Brady Bunch Lawnmower Massacre, Contact Pool 12" EP (Shock Records, 1990)
- I Spit on Your Gravy, St Kilda's Still Alright! CD (reissue on Turkeyneck Records with the Eat Your Head compilation tracks and unreleased live material, 2002)

=== Singles ===
- I Spit on Your Gravy, Let's Go Buy A Pizza 7" flexi (giveaway with Soft Option magazine, 1984)
- I Spit on Your Gravy, Pirahna/Man's Not A Camel 7" (Virgin Records, 1987)
- The Brady Bunch Lawnmower Massacre, Bourbon Bound/Sorry Orry 7" (Shock Records, 1991)
- The Brady Bunch Lawnmower Massacre, Drink Myself To Life/The Mystery of the Inca Cave 7" (Shagpile Records/Shock Records, 1992)
- The Fuck Fucks, T.I.T.S. (This Is The Show) 7" (2000)

=== Cassette-Only Releases ===
- The Editions, Obsession (Orgasm, 1982)
- The Editions, Recession? (Orgasm, 1982)
- The Gravybillies Live at the Esplanade Hotel, St Kilda (Polyester Records, 1988)

=== Compilations ===
- I Spit on Your Gravy, "Violent Fluff"/"Done To Death" on Eat Your Head LP (No Master's Voice, 1984; reissued on CD by Au-Go-Go Records, 1997)
- I Spit on Your Gravy, "Let’s Go Buy A Pizza" on Life Is A Joke Vol 2 LP (Weird System Records, 1986)
- The Band Who Shot Liberty Valance, "Tattslotto Song"/"Rubber Band Rave" on The Polyester Tape cassette (Polyster Records, 1986)
- The Band Who Shot Liberty Valance, "You Can't Speak To Me Like That" on SWAPO Benefit Recorded Live at Melbourne University 3/8/86 LP (Doc Records, 1987)
- The Brady Bunch Lawnmower Massacre, "Dostoievski (I Wanna Be Clive Robertson's Dick)" on Lemon 3 cassette (giveaway with the third issue of Lemon fanzine, 1990)
- The Fuck Fucks, "Hey Hey We're The Fuck Fucks"/"Hangin' Round The House"/"Happy" on Here Come Eleven Nuns (One with a Bucket of Chips For Me) CD (Buggertoe Records, 1996)
- Shonkytonk, "Brand New Appliance"/"I Hate Collingwood (But I Love You)" on Here Come Eleven Nuns (One with a Bucket of Chips For Me) CD (Buggertoe Records, 1996)
- Squirming Gerbil Death, "Up to My Brim in Rim" on Here Come Eleven Nuns (One with a Bucket of Chips For Me) CD (Buggertoe Records, 1996)
- Shonkytonk, "I'm Off Ya!"/"Soldering Iron" on Weened on a Pickle Soaked in Bile CD (Buggertoe Records, 1997)
- Squirming Gerbil Death, "Catholic School"/"Peakhour Frottage"/"Squirming Gerbil Death" on Weened on a Pickle Soaked in Bile CD (Buggertoe Records, 1997)
- I Spit on Your Gravy, "The Ballad of Scotty Stix Simpson" on Drunks, Guns And Livestock in the Streets: Live at the Turkeyneck Bar & Grill 1979-2001 CD (Turkeyneck Records, 2001)
- The Gravybillies, "Ballad of Rockin' Gomer" on Drunks, Guns And Livestock in the Streets: Live at the Turkeyneck Bar & Grill 1979-2001 CD (Turkeyneck Records, 2001)
- The Band Who Shot Liberty Valance, "You Can't Speak To Me Like That" on Drunks, Guns And Livestock in the Streets: Live at the Turkeyneck Bar & Grill 1979-2001 CD (Turkeyneck Records, 2001)
- They Might Be Negroes, "The Legend of Football Mouth" on Drunks, Guns And Livestock in the Streets Vol II: The Masked Wrestling Years 1978-2002 CD (Turkeyneck Records, 2003)

== Published work ==
Artwork appears in:

Piranhas in love / Fred Negro and Elizabeth Reale. Melbourne: Two Spaniards Press, 2018. ISBN 9780648125709

- InPress Magazine. Pub: Dharma Media, ABN 54 078 943 003.
- M.Walding and N.Vudovic (Eds). The Poster Art of Australian Popular Music Pub: Sept 2005 MUP, Miegunyah. ISBN 0-522-85168-1.

Honorary appointments:

- The Espy's artist in residence

Illustrations for

- Puppetry of the Penis – The Ancient Australian Art of Genital Origami [by David Friend and Simon Morley]. Published by Random House 2000 ISBN 1-74051-067-4

== Film work ==
- Lesbo-A-Go-Go dir Andrew Leavold, Brisbane, 2003. B&W/Colour, 52 mins. Appeared as 'Vision from Hell'. IMDB reference
  - "More entertainment value in its minuscule budget than a hundred Matrix Reloadeds..." Boris Lugosi, Girls Guns And Ghouls
  - "Ugly, reprehensible and morally repugnant. And I made the film." Andrew Leavold, writer/director
- Fred Sounds, dir. Rohan Pugh, 2003
- Fred's Love, dir. Rohan Pugh, 2005
- Sticky Carpet, dir. Mark Butcher, 2006 (I Spit on Your Gravy live footage)
