= Aaron McCarthy =

Australian television presenter

- Occupation: Television presenter
- Known for: Live on Bowen 2012–present TV variety show What's Up Downunder Travel TV show

Aaron McCarthy (born 26 February ?) is a TV presenter on the Channel 10 travel program What's Up Downunder. He also has hosting roles on Live on Bowen, Melbourne 22 & Victoria's Islands on C31. Aaron appeared on the front cover of Fjorde Magazine Issue XV.
