= C31 Melbourne =

Community television channel in Melbourne

- Type: Community television
- Country: Australia
- Broadcast area: Melbourne, Geelong, surrounding areas
- Headquarters: 2/4 Douglas Street; Southbank, Victoria

Programming
- Language: English
- Picture format: 576i (SDTV) 16:9

Ownership
- Owner: Melbourne Community Television Consortium
- Sister channels: Channel 44 Adelaide

History
- Launched: 6 October 1994; 32 years ago

Links
- Website: c31.org.au

Availability

Terrestrial
- DVB-T: 32 (Melbourne); 42 (South Yarra)
- Freeview (virtual): 44

C31 Melbourne is a free-to-air community television channel in Melbourne, Victoria, Australia. Its name is derived from UHF 31, the frequency and channel number reserved for analogue broadcasts by metropolitan community television stations in Australia.

== History ==
The station began broadcasting officially on 6 October 1994, with racing programming on Saturday nights and regular programming from Monday to Thursday. Test transmissions began on 23 August 1994, after its transmitter was installed on Mount Dandenong the previous day. The Australian Broadcasting Authority had granted Melbourne Community Television Consortium (MCTC) with a temporary open-narrowcast licence on 5 March 1993. The framework of community television in Australia can be traced back to 1992, when the government asked the ABA to conduct a trial of community television using the vacant sixth television channel 31. On 30 July 2004, the Australian Broadcasting Authority granted the station a full-time community broadcasting licence.

C31 began broadcasting in digital during June 2010.

C31 is primarily funded through sponsorship, grants, sale of airtime and member donations. The station does not receive any regular government funding. The annual revenue of C31 is approximately (AUD) $1.3 million per year. For comparison, the Nine Network, an Australian commercial station, has $907 million annual revenue. The station claims that "1.4 million Melburnians tune in each month" this figure is supplied by the ratings company OzTam. Individual programs can have ratings of up to 180,000 viewers.

The C31 website was completely remodelled in 2009, offering streaming of every program they broadcast (if the producer consents). C31 Melbourne was the only community television broadcast in Australia which offered this. A new website, ctvplus.org.au, was released in 2016 and offers livestreaming of both C31 Melbourne, C44 Adelaide, and catch-up viewing of over 80 programs.

C31 announced to its digital service provider and officially began simulcasting from 2010 on logical channel number 44. C31 officially started broadcasting in digital on 28 May 2010 with the official launch date on 11 June.

On 27 June 2010, the community TV programming was rebranded "C31" with new logo, identities, schedule and watermark.

On 1 March 2012, C31 ceased broadcasting its analogue signal, and became available only as logical digital channel 44.

In September 2014, Australian federal communications minister Malcolm Turnbull announced that licensing for community television stations would end in December 2015. In September 2015, Turnbull, then Prime Minister, announced an extension of the deadline to 31 December 2016.

C31, like other community television stations, started moving operations online, and began streaming its channel live from ctvplus.org.au, allowing access to viewers outside of its traditional broadcast area. In April 2016, C31 became the first community station to offer a mobile app that offers live streaming and video-on-demand catch-up television. A new and improved mobile app, CTV+, was released on 26 August 2022. An app for smart TVs is currently under development.

The deadline was further extended twice at the last minute by Minister for Communications Mitch Fifield, first to 30 June 2017, and later to 31 December 2017. Fifield made an additional extension to 30 June 2018 as part of the government's deal with the Nick Xenophon Team to garner support for large-scale media reforms in the Senate, while a further extension, announced on 1 June 2018, gave broadcasters an additional two years through 30 June 2020. In June 2020, they were given another 12-month extension. In June 2021, thanks to amendments tabled by South Australian Senator Rex Patrick, the station was given a three-year extension.

In 2024 the legislation was changed to allow C31 to stay on the air until such time as the ACMA decides to reallocate its broadcast spectrum for another purpose.

== Transmission quality ==
Its signal is transmitted from Mount Dandenong and Como Centre, South Yarra, reaching much of the Greater Melbourne, Geelong and West Gippsland areas on free-to-air television.

C31 is available on digital via UHF 32 in Melbourne & Geelong and UHF 66 in South Yarra.

== Programming ==
C31 broadcasts a vast array of locally produced content including news, sport, youth, arts, and entertainment programs. The station also features a substantial amount of local multicultural programming, celebrating Melbourne's ethnic diversity.

=== FishCam ===
FishCam is arguably C31's best-known program. It was a pre-recorded broadcast of a fish tank located in the station's studios, set to music by independent artists. It used to be live, but the station got complaints from the Australian Communications & Media Authority when there was a dead fish floating on the top of the tank for several days. It was originally shown in place of a test pattern when the station had no programming available for broadcast. After it was discovered that FishCam was reasonably popular, FishCam became a scheduled show and was even listed in the TV guide. C31 has boasted that Fishcam is "very popular" and is so widely recognised in the Melbourne community that "many people know C31 as 'the fish station'."

The station has previously made VHS tapes of FishCam available for purchase. After having its timeslot continually cut back over the years to make room for more traditional programming, FishCam finally ceased broadcasting on 4 March 2007. On 13 October 2014, FishCam returned at the new time of 9 p.m., hosted by Luis from Lessons with Luis. The return of FishCam coincided with the station's twentieth anniversary.

=== Other programs ===
- The NEMBC Multicultural AFL Football Panel Show. A weekly Multicultural and diversity look at AFL Footy, hosted by Vanessa Gatica with Harbir Singh Kang and Gabriel d'Angelo, Exec Producer/ Director: Fiv Antoniou. Supported by the Australian Football League (AFL) and the Community Broadcast Foundation.
- The NEMBC All About A-League Show, a weekly Australian soccer program hosted by Gabriel D'Angelo with Bernd Merkel and Alex Anifantis. Directed by: Santina Cotela, Exec. Producer: Fiv Antoniou supported by the Community Broadcast Foundation (CBF)
- Melbourne Musos – The Drum Show is a popular educational Drum Clinic show hosted by Chris Quinlan (f.dip.a) which specialises in all musical styles as applied to Drums and Percussion. With over 625 shows produced since 1995, Melbourne Musos – The Drum Show has been one of the longest continuously running shows on Australian Television with host Chris Quinlan receiving a nomination for Australian of the Year in 2013.
- More Amore was a popular dating-game show, hosted by Jason Allen and Julia Zass and produced through RMITV
- YouFishTV is a popular program hosted by Brendan Wing which highlights the fishing experiences of everyday Australians. The show features a soundtrack produced by the Australian outfit BabyAtom.
- Catch n Cook, with over 300 shows over six years, each week for six years rain hail or shine, starring Ron Smith, Antonio Curulli, Neil Morrison and Gina Corso, would take viewers on their fishing journeys presenting fishing adventures from different parts of Australia, and enjoying cooking their catch for audiences, in all culinary styles.
- Dollars With Sense is a half-hour TV show which seeks to raise the financial literacy of the general community, with good, unbiased advice from the cream of the financial industry.
- Morningshines is a sketch comedy program presented as a morning show for nights, hosted by Mike and Steve.

The logo for Deaf TV, one of the diverse programs on C31

- Fusion Latina is a magazine-style show that explores the passion of the Spanish and Latin American culture in Australia.
- The Bazura Project is a movie show featuring film news, feature stories, interviews, and reviews. It is hosted by Shannon Marinko and Lee Zachariah.
- The Gig Bag is a program about music and musical gear hosted by Sabrina Scheller and Chris Frangou.
- A Green House Around the Corner is a show about Learn Local Centres adding sustainable practices to their facilities produced by Eastern Regional Access Television which was one of the founding groups of Channel 31 Melbourne in 1994.
- AnimeLab On-air is a block of anime produced by Madman Entertainment which shows anime titles from its producer.
- Anime Snacktime Hour is a block of anime produced by Madman Entertainment which shows anime titles from its producer.
- Get Cereal TV is an hour-long breakfast show produced by SYN, airing weekday mornings from 7:30.
- Barnaby Flowers is the collective of Melbourne writers, directors and producers behind the popular C31 shows, Barnaby Flowers Comeback Special & Barnaby Flowers Bumper Bonanza a live hour-long sketch show and "Barnaby Flowers A Time to Talk", a satirical mock interview show.
- Chartbusting 80s one of C31's most popular and resource-intensive studio shows.
- Boob Tube hosted by Jo Stanley and Jodie J Hill
- Darren & Brose, C31's very first live, nightly program
- Damon Dark is an indie science fiction program about a UFO hunter, created by Adrian Sherlock and presented by Eastern Regional Access Television (ERA TV) in 1999. It continues to this day as a web series on YouTube where the original 1999 content is also archived.
- Eastern Newsbeat is a program that interviews local community groups in the outer east of Melbourne about community events with Producers Peter McArthur and Bill Page and Reporter Tricia Ziemer. It started with C31 in 1994 and has put to air over 1,127 programs in 23 years. Peter McArthur was one of the co-founders of C31 Melbourne as part of one of the original community groups "Eastern Regional Access Television Inc"
- Gasolene is a program that showcases anything to do with petrochemical engines, auto repairs or metalworking.
- Good Evening Melbourne/Extra Edition is a local weekly community based news / current affairs program. It features stories dedicated to the Greek community of Melbourne. Its current hosts are Sotiris Sotiropoulos (Sunday) and Platon Denezakis (Monday). The program is produced by GCTV since 1998.
- Gridiron Victoria TV is a program that covers all the action of the Victorian American Football League, previously hosted by Eric Williams, Alison Deane & Daniel Ratanapintha.
- The Inquiry is a news program with a youth-oriented comedic spin.
- Kidz in the Kitchen is a television show produced by Eastern Regional Access Television that has currently finished its 8th season. Featuring chef Gabriel Gate, the kids learn to cook quick meals from fresh ingredients. Produced, directed and hosted by Tricia Ziemer.
- Planet Nerd is a variety show for, and about, nerds and geeks. It is hosted by Dan Walmsley.
- In Pit Lane is C31's weekly motor sports program that has run for 18 years.
- Level 3, a video game review show with over 200 episodes
- Live on Bowen, a live variety and talk show broadcast from the RMITV studios in Bowen Lane, hosted by Melbourne TV personality Aaron Mccarthy.
- The Loft Live which was hosted by Rove McManus and later Kim Hope
- Magic Dudes: As Seen on TV The made-for-television series show cases the sleight-of-hand magic of the performing duo, the Magic Dudes. The series was filmed in front of a live audience and was based on a pilot that first was shown on C31 Adelaide in 2004.
- No Limits is a talk show about living with disability. It is a high-profile and popular show. Its 'politically correct' content gives support to C31's raison d'etre.
- Pinoy TV is a television program which is dedicated to Filipino-Australians living in Melbourne, Sydney and Darwin. It features cooking, news and cultural events. Pinoy TV is hosted by "Ate G" (Giselle Gonzales) and "DJ Gwapz".
- Racing Fashion TV is a series hosted by Anna Mott which focuses on fashions on the field at various horse racing events and functions around Australia.
- Scoop tv is a weekly Melbourne comedy/talk show covering topical and entertainment news. Website
- Sightsee TV A travel show visiting small towns, primarily in Victoria.
- Sketchmen a Sydney-based sketch comedy show.
- Thai Ties a show covering events from the Thai-Melburnian community, teaching Thai cooking, Thai language and also the journey into host Daniel Ratanapintha's Thai heritage, when he visits Thailand.
- The Shambles Sketch comedy show starring Sos, Valvo & Lynchy.
- TheatreGames LIVE is a program where a number of actors compete against each other playing improvisation and theatre games.
- Blurb is a book review television program featuring Misha Adair and Natasha Ludowyk.
- The Ugly Stick a sketch comedy program featuring the ugly stick comedy troupe.
- 1700 a live daily music show produced by SYN, with sms interaction, video clips, music news and many segments
- In Search of... a weekly documentary series
- Paranormal Investigators Television series which looks into the paranormal as a group of people go out to often secluded locations in search of the paranormal
- GolfZone TV Golf themed TV show, featuring golf instruction, golf rules, golf product reviews, course reviews and rule interpretation.
- 4WD TV A weekly program focusing on Australian four-wheel-drive culture.
- Russian Kaleidoscope is a weekly program for the Russian Community in Melbourne. The show includes local news, interviews and Russian documentaries. It is hosted by Dmitry Likane.
- The Marngrook Footy Show is an indigenous AFL footy program on National Indigenous Television.
- The GDFL Footy Show is local Aussie rules football show from the Geelong region featuring Dick Philpott, Richard 'Grubby' Cations, Alex Tigani and former Geelong mayor John Mitchell. The show enters its 16th season in 2016.
- The Local Footy Show is local Aussie rules football show across Victoria.
- The Struggle is a satirical news show produced by students at Monash University and MOJO News
- The Wrap is a weekly live-to-air news entertainment program produced by SYN.
- Local Knowledge is a weekly documentary series. It is hosted by Colette Werden
- With Tim Ferguson – live satirical comedy show hosted by Tim Ferguson
- Hound TV is a weekly program all about dogs
- Underground Sounds is a weekly program all about metal music
- Under Melbourne Tonight hosted by Stephen Hall
- The Gorilla Position is a weekly program all about pro wrestling
- The Rushed Behind is a weekly AFL commentary, analysis and variety panel show hosted by Nick D'Urbano, Brooke Varney, Chris Nice and Athos Siranos.
- Top Drop TV – A beer and wine travel guide. Produced by Nicholas Isaacs and presented by Chris Yeend, Jarrod Geer and Nicholas Isaacs
- GCN Focus – A local news program which features positive local stories from the Geelong region. The program is hosted by Jack Nyhof and other various co-presenters.
- The Shtick – Australia's Only Jewish TV show with Henry Greener, since 2004, producing over 700 episodes over 67 seasons. Online YouTube Channel TheShtick TV and Video Archive from www.theshtick.tv
- CITIZENS REPORT – linked with the Australian Citizens Party. It was formerly called CEC Report. It began screening on Channel 31 in January 2012.

== Personalities ==
Many comedians, performing artists and producers worked at C31 before moving to mainstream television; these people include Rove McManus, Amy Parks, Greg Tingle, Hamish and Andy's Hamish Blake and Andy Lee, Adam Richard, Peter Helliar, Merrick and Rosso's Merrick Watts and Tim Ross, Jo Stanley, Darren Chau, Corinne Grant, Jamie McDonald, Tom Ballard, Tommy Little, Dave Thornton, Jess Harris, Alex Tigani, Josh Schmidt and Kim Hope.

== Logos ==
1994–2002

2002 – 27 June 2010

27 June 2010 – present

== See also ==
- Television broadcasting in Australia
- Community television in Australia
