= Stephen Hall (actor) =

Australian actor, writer and producer (born 1969)

- Born: 17 May 1969 (age 57); Melbourne, Australia
- Years active: 1987−present

Stephen Hall (born 17 May 1969) is an Australian actor, writer and producer.

== Career ==
=== Television ===
Hall's career in television includes acting, writing and production duties. He was the host of Under Melbourne Tonight, a weekly live variety hour television program produced by RMITV that broadcast on C31 Melbourne from 1993 to 1998. He has appeared in the long-running television series Neighbours, and in 2008 he performed the role of Warren in the Australian Broadcasting Corporation (ABC) television comedy series The Hollowmen.

He has also appeared in telemovies, including The King (2007), playing the role of Bert Newton.

As a producer, he worked on the Australian version of the game show Deal or No Deal.

As a TV writer he has worked on many Australian comedy and light entertainment TV productions, such as BackBerner, Big Bite, Full Frontal, and Spicks and Specks. He was a writer on the third series of the weekly satirical comedy programme Newstopia, broadcast on SBS in 2008. From 2009 to 2012, Hall served as head writer on the comedy game show Talkin' 'bout Your Generation. In 2013, he wrote for ABC-TV's weekly satirical comedy show Shaun Micallef's Mad as Hell, and Adam Hills Tonight series 2, of which he was also the Studio Producer.

From 2014 to 2022, Hall was a regular cast member on Shaun Micallef's Mad as Hell, with popular characters including the political spokesman Darius Horsham.

=== Film ===
Hall's movie career includes appearances in Romper Stomper, The Wog Boy, Now Add Honey, That's Not My Dog! and Fraud Festival.

=== Theatre ===
Hall starred in the original Australian professional production of Monty Python's Spamalot in 2007, playing the roles of Lancelot, The French Taunter, Tim The Enchanter and The Head Knight of "Ni".

In 2011, Hall co-wrote (with Michael Ward) the comedy stage show Bond-A-Rama! Every James Bond Film Live On Stage, in which he played the roles of Sean Connery, Roger Moore and Pierce Brosnan. The show sold out, prompting a second season in 2012.

In 2023, Hall wrote, produced and performed in the one-man stage show LETTERS FROM MY HEROES... if they'd actually bothered to write back, for the Melbourne International Comedy Festival. The show was then revived for a successful tour of regional Victoria in June and July of 2024.

In March 2016, John Cleese cast Hall as Basil Fawlty in Cleese's own stage adaptation of his TV series Fawlty Towers. Fawlty Towers Live opened in Sydney at the Roslyn Packer Theatre in August 2016, and toured Australia, running for 157 performances before finishing in Brisbane on 22 January 2017. The show received favourable reviews in each city it played in.

In 2023, Hall wrote, produced and performed in the one-man stage show LETTERS FROM MY HEROES... if they'd actually bothered to write back for the Melbourne International Comedy Festival.

== Quiz show champion ==
In August 2005, Hall completed seven nights on the quiz show Temptation, becoming the program's second Grand Champion, and the second largest quiz or game show winner in Australian television history (at that time), winning $672,357 in cash and prizes. The following year, he won the title of "Australia's Brainiest Quiz Master" on the Australian TV program of the same name and donating $20,000 to RSPCA, and appeared as part of The Brains Trust on The Einstein Factor.

Since 2013, he has run the blog www.HowToWinGameShows.com, which aims to provide tips and hints for winning game shows.

== Filmography ==
=== Television ===
Year	Title	Role	Notes
1988	All the Way	Richard Dodds	TV series
1989	The Flying Doctors	Constable Pat Chandler	TV series
1990	Neighbours	Gary "Boof" Head	TV series
1993	RFDS	Keith Bainbridge	TV series
1993−98	Under Melbourne Tonight	Host	TV series
1994	A Country Practice	Dennis Chubb	TV series
1994	The Damnation of Harvey McHugh	Smedley	TV miniseries
1995	The Last Bullet	Fitzgerald	TV movie
1999	BackBerner	Various characters	TV series
2000	Russell Gilbert Live	Various characters	TV sketch series
2003	Welcher & Welcher	Security guard	TV series
2003	After the Deluge	Maggie's husband	TV miniseries
2003	Big Bite	Various characters	TV sketch series
2004	2004 AFI Awards	James Killarney	TV special
2004−09	The Einstein Factor	The Brains Trust panel member (regular)	TV game series
2005	Temptation	Contestant (winner)	TV game series
2006	Australia's Brainiest	Contestant (Australia's Brainiest Quiz Master)	TV game series
2008	Newstopia	William Shatner	TV series
2008	The Hollowmen	Warren	TV series
2010	Offspring	Grown Up Man	TV series pilot
2010	Tangle	Dr Ian Hill	TV series
2010	Killing Time	Ken Garland	TV series
2011	Beaconsfield	Howard Sacre	TV miniseries
2011	The Slap	Jim, the Businessman	TV miniseries
2011−22	Shaun Micallef's Mad as Hell	Darius Horsham & various characters	TV series
2012	Get Ace	Jack Union (voice)	Animated TV series
2013	The Time of Our Lives	Bam Bam	TV series
2014	Upper Middle Bogan	Digby Nolan	TV series, season 2
2015	Exchange Student Zero	Voice	Animated TV series
2016	The Wrong Girl	Graeme the Coin Guy	TV series
2016−17	Pacific Heat	Voice	Animated TV series
2017	When TV Was Awesome	Narrator	TV special
2017−19	Kitty is Not a Cat	The Nazz / Lucky Chuck (voice)	Animated TV series
2017−19	Mustangs FC	Kev	TV series
2018	True Story	Dr Santos	TV series, season 2
2019	Monster Beach	Butterfield (voice)	Animated TV series
2020	Shaun Micallef's Mad as Hell - Christmas Special	Various characters	TV special
2022	We Interrupt This Broadcast	Guest	TV sketch series

=== Film ===
Year	Title	Role	Notes
1992	Romper Stomper	Flea	Feature film
2000	The Wog Boy	Sergeant	Feature film
2007	The King	Bert Newton	TV movie
2015	Now Add Honey	Concierge	Feature film
2018	That's Not My Dog!	Himself	Feature film
	Fraud Festival		Feature film

=== Writer/producer ===
Year	Title	Role	Notes
	Deal or No Deal	Producer	TV game series
	BackBerner	Writer	TV series
	Big Bite	Writer	TV series
	Full Frontal	Writer	TV series
	Spicks and Specks	Writer	TV game series
2008	Newstopia	Writer	TV series, season 3
2009-12	Talkin' 'bout Your Generation	Head writer	TV game series
2012	Adam Hills Tonight	Writer / Studio producer	TV series, season 2
2013	Shaun Micallef's Mad as Hell	Writer	TV series

== Theatre ==
Year	Title	Role	Notes
2001	I Said I Said	Phineas Witt	Melbourne International Comedy Festival
2007	Monty Python's Spamalot	Lancelot, The French Taunter, Tim The Enchanter & The Head Knight of "Ni"	Ozalot Pty Ltd
2011-12	Bond-A-Rama! Every James Bond Film Live On Stage	Sean Connery, Roger Moore & Pierce Brosnan	
2013/14	Raiders of the Temple of Doom's Last Crusade; One Man Performs Three Indiana Jones Movies in One Hour	Performer	Melbourne Fringe Festival / Melbourne International Comedy Festival (also writer & producer
2016-17	Fawlty Towers Live	Basil Fawlty	Roslyn Packer Theatre & Australian tour, 157 performances
2017	Brigadoon	Archie Beaton	The Production Company

== Books ==
Year	Title	Notes
2015	How To Win Game Shows	eBook
2019-20	Symphony Under Siege	Paperback & eBook
2022	50 Things To Be Seriously Grateful For Today* *and 50 not-so-serious things to illustrate them	

== Radio ==
Year	Title	Role	Notes
1989-93	The Marta Thripp Druidic Building Society Show TSP (in colour)	Core cast member	3RRR
1999	Breakfasters	Guest	3RRR
2005	The Loading Zone	Guest panellist	ABC Radio
2006	Home with the Howards	John Howard	ABC Radio
2015	Night Terrace	Francisco de Cuellar & Sir Francis Drake	Digital; Season 2, episode: "The Retirement of Horatio Gray" (later broadcast on BBC Radio 4 Extra
