= Pete Boone, Private Eye =

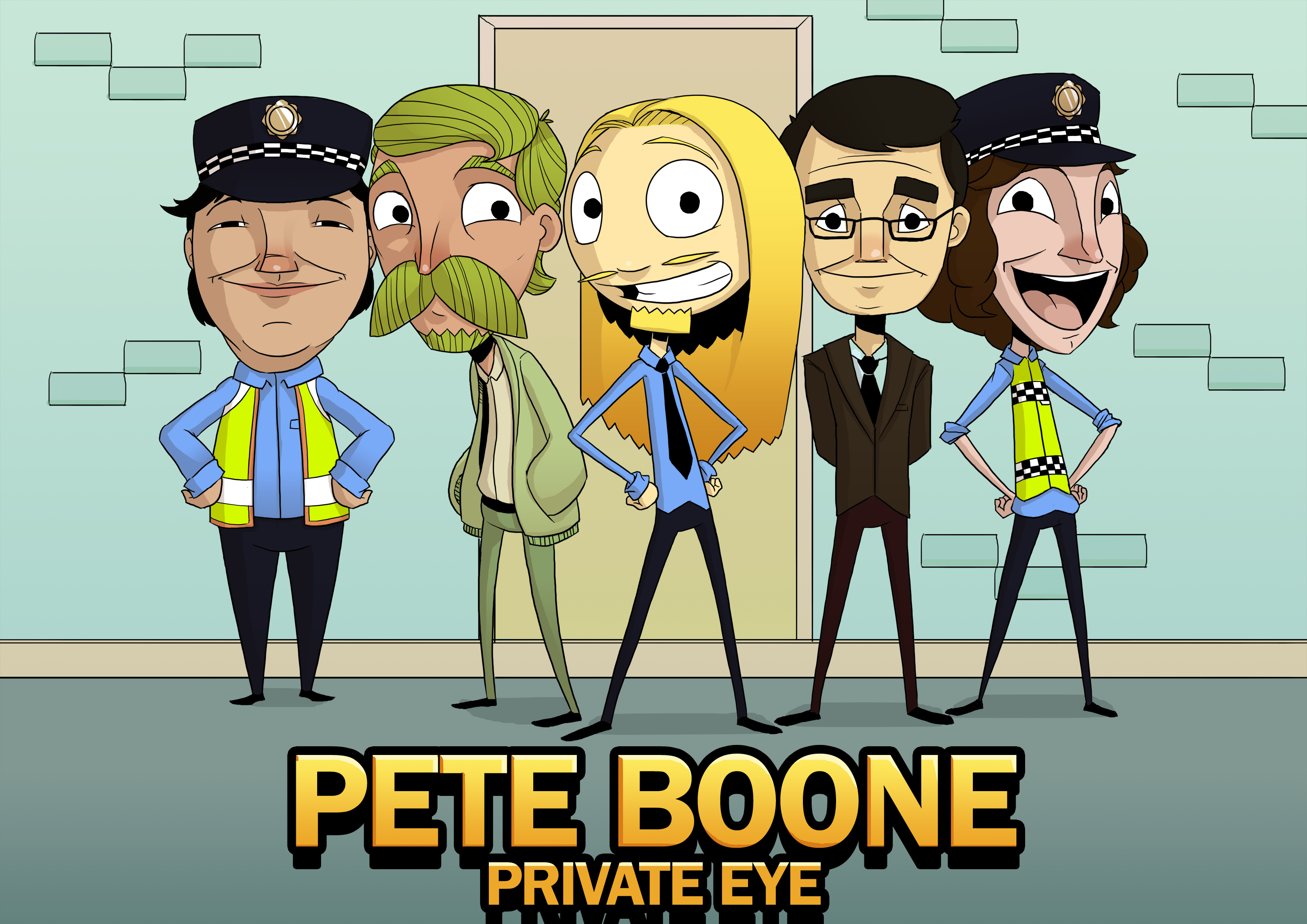
- Genre: Comedy; Crime
- Created by: David Murdoch
- Written by: David Murdoch
- Directed by: Peter Warner; Matt Reekie; Strawberry James; Seamus McCann; Peter Love; David Murdoch; Jay Mitra; Kurtis Wakefield; Atlas Adams
- Starring: Peter Attwood; Peter Love; Peter Warner; Mark Pereira; Peter Murkins; Will Seaman (Current)
- Theme music composer: Paul McCarlie
- Opening theme: Pete Boone Theme (No Favours)
- Composer: Paul McCarlie
- Country of origin: Australia
- Original language: English
- No. of series: 8
- No. of episodes: 86

Production
- Executive producers: David Murdoch; Jamieson McNeil; Seamus Mcann; Strawberry James; Sunnah Rose
- Producer: David Murdoch
- Production locations: Hills District, Sydney
- Cinematography: Strawberry James; David Murdoch
- Editors: Strawberry James; David Murdoch
- Camera setup: Single-camera
- Running time: 22-26 minutes
- Production company: Sleek Haze Productions

Original release
- Network: Channel 31, Television Sydney (TVS); Aurora
- Release: 12 August 2002

Pete Boone, Private Eye is an Australian crime comedy television series created and produced by David Murdoch. The show originally aired on Channel 31, before moving to Aurora on Foxtel. It tells the story of Pete Boone, "Australia’s worst detective" who never correctly solves a case. The series is set in a fictional version West Pennant Hills, called "West Pennant Falls". It currently stars Will Seaman as Pete Boone: he is the sixth actor to lead as the titular character. The show has a cult status, and the 1001st televised episode aired on Aurora on 14 December 2014.

== Pre-Television ==
Pete Boone (Peter Warner) first appeared in "The Rick Ford Files" series in 1980. In 1988, Boone was spun off into a short film that won the Australian Amateur Cine Society International Film Festival award for Best Video. In 1990, Boone was played by Peter Book in a short film which was later remade for TV.

== Episodes ==
=== Season 1 (2002) ===
The 1st season premiered on Channel 31 on 12 August 2002. Jamie McNeil (executive producer) and Strawberry James (director) cast Peter John Attwood as Boone after meeting him in a bar.

Boone investigates murders, but inspector Gravel (Mark Pereira) suspects Boone is the serial killer. Dirk Lombarde (Peter Warner) is introduced as Pete’s rival. A series of flashbacks show Boone’s troubled childhood lead him to become a detective.

=== Season 2 (2007) ===
In 2005, the show was moved to Aurora (Foxtel). In 2007, David Murdoch took over directing. The 2nd season premiered on 5 July 2007.

Constable O'Flynn (Peter Murkins) forces Gravel to partner with Pete Boone (Peter Love) to solve another series of murders. This season introduces behind the scenes, messages to the fans, and Christmas episodes.

=== Season 3 (2009) ===
The 3rd season premiered on 5 July 2009.

Pete Boone and inspector Gravel save the town from zombies, corporate demolition, and a new serial killer.

=== Season 4 (2010) ===
The 4th season premiered on 8 August 2010. This season featured two episodes filmed by the Sydney Science Revue.

Boone searches for treasure. Gravel frames and imprisons Boone, who is vindicated with the assistance of Dirk Lombarde. The season ends on a documentary celebrating 30 years of Boone.

=== Season 5 (2013) ===
The 5th season premiered on 14 April 2013. This season was produced by fans, and featured the new animated opening.

Gravel is sent back to 1980. After returning to the present, he thwarts a terrorist plot with Boone (Ciaran Magee). The season concludes with Policeman One and Two (James Colley, Felix Marsh-Wakefield) writing their own version of Boone’s origin story.

=== Season 6 (2014) ===
The 6th season premiered on 13 December 2013. Tim Anderson and Ryan O'Malley cameoed as Pete Boone.

Boone's office has been left in the hands of a serial killer, Simon (Simon Walker). Simon impersonates Boone as a cover. The Metre send their best agent, Clint Pettifrock (Atlas Adams) to investigate. Simon repeatedly foils Clint Pettifrock. The Metre sends Catherine Marble (Susan Grace Roach) to take over.

=== Season 7 (2016) ===
The 7th season premiered on 7 September 2016.

Boone (Will Seaman) returns and hires Simon as an assistant. Simon frames Clint Pettifrock for the serial killings. Simon makes a deal with the devil, and he now must keep Boone alive as they solve cases in West Pennant Falls. Boone and Simon break Clint out of prison.

=== Season 8 (2017) ===
The 8th season premiered on 23 August 2017.

Boone and Simon enlist the help of Clint Pettifrock to find missing paintings. Simon falls in love with his copy-cat serial killer, Sophie. Boone meets Inspector Gravel and St Peter at the gates of heaven. Inspector Gravel is admitted, but Boone is sent back to Earth to get a haircut.

This season featured the 100th television episode of ‘Pete Boone, Private Eye'.

=== Season 9 (2020) ===
The 9th season premiered on 22 February 2020.

Boone hires an unconvincing "doppelgänger" (Conor Smith) to cover for him at the office. Only Simon notices the switch. Simon sees this as a chance to break his deal with the devil by finally having "Pete Boone" solve a case. The original Pete Boone returns after accidentally creating a war between Canada and Mexico.

=== Season 10 (TBC) ===
The 10th season is currently in pre-production.

== Main characters ==
Actor	Character	Role	Seasons
Will Seaman (Current)	Pete Boone	Australia's worst detective.	1-9
Mark Pereira	Inspector Gravel	A local inspector forced to work with Boone.	1-9
	Cleo	A killer wombat that appears once per season.	1-9
Peter Warner	Dirk Lombarde/Pete Boone 1980-1998	Boone’s antithesis, and rival detective.	1-4
Peter Murkins	Constable O’Flynn	A local constable who befriends Boone.	1-4
James Colley	Policeman One	A local officer who isn’t a good judge of character.	4-5
Felix Marsh-Wakefield	Policeman Two	A local officer who can’t remember faces.	4-8
Simon Walker	Simon	A serial killer who impersonates Boone.	6-9
Atlas Adams	Clint Pettifrock	A Metre agent sent to investigate the serial killings.	6-9
Susan Grace Roach	Catherine Marble	A Metre agent sent to take over from Clint Pettifrock.	6-7
