= Koori Radio =

Indigenous community radio station in Sydney, Australia

- Australia
- Broadcast area: Sydney
- Frequency: 93.7 MHz FM

Programming
- Format: Indigenous programming

Ownership
- Owner: Gadigal Information Service

History
- First air date: December 2002 (full-time; had broadcast since 1993)
- Call sign meaning: 2 = New South Wales; Live aNd; Deadly

Technical information
- Class: Community radio

Links
- Website: Official website

Koori Radio (callsign 2LND), is a community radio station based in Redfern broadcasting to Sydney on a citywide licence. Since the early 1990s it has been part of the Gadigal Information Service (GIS), and is the only radio station in Sydney providing full-time broadcasting to the Aboriginal and Torres Strait Islander community.

Radio Redfern was the precursor to Koori Radio in the 1980s, but was not connected.

== Background: Radio Redfern ==
Radio Redfern was the precursor to Koori Radio. In 1981, Maureen Watson and her son Tiga Bayles started broadcasting for 10 minutes each week on community radio station 2SER 107.3 FM. After Radio Skid Row (2RSR 88.9 FM) was licensed as a community broadcaster in 1984, it gave 10 hours of air time per week to Radio Redfern. 2RSR was initially broadcast from the University of Sydney, before moving to a terraced house at 27 Cope Street, in Redfern, next to the old Black Theatre building.

It broadcast 30–40 hours a week, with all staff being volunteers, among other things playing an important role in informing the Sydney Aboriginal community about protests related to the 1988 Australian Bicentenary as well as Aboriginal deaths in custody. Around 1991 the building was demolished, at the same time as the old Black Theatre building.

A documentary film about Radio Redfern, 88.9 Radio Redfern, was released in 1988. The 54-minute film features Linda Burney, Maureen Watson, Brenda Croft, Oodgeroo Noonuccal, Mac Silva, Tiga Bayles, and many others. It was directed and produced by Sharon Bell, co-directed by Geoff Burton.

== History ==
It was the success of Radio Redfern that inspired Cathy Craigie, Matthew Cook, and Tim Bishop to set up the Gadigal Information Service (GIS), an Aboriginal-owned and -operated communication organisation. Koori Radio began broadcasting on community station Radio Skid Row around 1993 under the auspices of GIS, and moved in to its own premises in Redfern in the upper level of a terraced house on the corner of Cleveland and Edwards Streets, near The Block. In 1995, American rapper Ice Cube opened the radio's new studios.

Koori Radio was part of a series of national Indigenous radio broadcasts during the Sydney 2000 Olympics, from a temporary location in Marrickville. Other Indigenous radio stations around the country received regular updates from Sydney via the National Indigenous Radio Service, and stations from all over broadcast into Sydney through Koori Radio.

The ACMA granted the licence to broadcast full-time across Sydney on 25 May 2001. Koori Radio began full-time broadcasting on 93.7FM in December 2002 with a 1 kW transmitter, switching to a new 50 kW transmitter in December 2003.

In 2005, the Indigenous Land Corporation purchased the site on Cope Street formerly occupied by Radio Redfern and the Black Theatre. In 2008 Koori Radio received Australian Government funding to move into purpose-built studios with Black Theatre in Redfern. A new building was designed by architects Tonkin Zulaikha Greer to accommodate the recording studios and offices of the Gadigal Information Service, with exterior artwork created by Aboriginal artist Adam Hill (now known as Blak Douglas), inspired by the life of Kevin Gilbert and his writing of the play The Cherry Pickers. The building was opened in 2008.

Author and academic Anita Heiss was voluntary chair of the radio station until 2008.

== Programming ==
Koori Radio is the city's only Indigenous Australian music station. As of 2008 the music format was one third Australian Indigenous, one third world Indigenous and one-third other black music. The station broadcasts live from 07:00 to 00:00 with a music service overnight. It is a volunteer-run organisation and is funded through listener support, grants and limited commercial sponsorship.

As well as its format of Indigenous and black music, the station broadcasts news, current affairs, sport and listener involvement programs. There are also programs by the Samoan and Māori communities.

As of 2008 Koori Radio's flagship program was Blackchat, a current affairs program discussing news, issues and events from an Indigenous perspective which was broadcast on weekday mornings. Koori Radio also contributes programming to the National Indigenous Radio Service.

Koori Radio's programming also features Koori Radio Sport, an entertainment programme that covers the latest in sport news, with a focus on Aboriginal and Torres Strait Islander players. Richard Baini is a regular co-host of Koori Radio Sport and is best known for his segment Richie's Rants.

It also features Marloo's Blues, a programme of blues and roots music hosted by Marlene Cummins.

== Recognition ==
The Gadigal Information Service is the subject of an interview with Lily Shearer in an episode of the 2013 TV documentary series Desperate Measures. It is available on SBS on Demand.

== See also ==
- List of radio stations in Australia
- Australian Indigenous Communications Association
