= 3ZZZ =

- Mount Dandenong; Australia
- Broadcast area: Melbourne, Victoria
- Frequency: 92.3 MHz FM

Programming
- Language: Various
- Format: Multilingual programming

Ownership
- Owner: Ethnic Public Broadcasting Association of Victoria Ltd.

History
- First air date: June 1989
- Call sign meaning: 3 – Victoria; ZZZ –

Technical information
- ERP: 56 kW
- Transmitter coordinates: 37.8364°S 145.3472°E

Links
- Website: www.3zzz.com.au

3ZZZ (3 Triple Zed) is an ethnic community radio station in Melbourne, Victoria that currently broadcasts programs in over 70 languages on 92.3 MHz FM and is licensed to Mount Dandenong.

3ZZZ is Australia's largest community multilingual radio station, with estimates at over 400,000 listeners, providing an independent, alternative and local voice in the media.

== History ==
3ZZZ began regular broadcasting on 92.3 MHz (the old 3EON frequency) in June 1989.

3ZZZ was successful in a licence application that was contested at the time by a Spanish language broadcasting group known as "The Voice of Hispano America (VHA-FM)".

The community broadcast licence was granted to 3ZZZ on the basis of its diversity of languages and communities represented.

3ZZZ began streaming online in 2000 and was launched on digital radio in 2010.

=== Brief history of ethnic broadcasting in Australia ===
In 2006, 3ZZZ celebrated 30 years of ethnic broadcasting in Australia. Ethnic broadcasting in Australia emerged from community and political campaigns in the early 1970s.

The beginning of ethnic broadcasting in Australia goes back to 1973. The ethnic community in Australia was very large, socially and politically conscious and active. It began to work together with the more enlightened and democratic sections of the wider Australian community, and threw its considerable strength and influence into the campaigns for access and equity to the nation's airwaves.

In 1975, the community run, and ABC owned and assisted access radio 3ZZ was born, with 20 ethnic communities being the first to broadcast in their languages, through the national broadcaster. 3CR and 3EA were not far behind. (3CR at that time broadcast no ethnic programs.) But it was 3ZZ that provided for the first time opportunity for ordinary people to have a say on air in their own language, and to have a say as to how the station was managed.

3ZZ has lobbied governments and other institutions to recognise and respect the significance of ethnic broadcasting as 3ZZ sees it. The closure of 3ZZ in 1977 was vigorously fought against.

Ethnic communities from across the socio-political spectrum vigorously protested the closure of 3ZZ by the Fraser government in 1977. Thousands of members of the community joined up, with hundreds serving as broadcasters and committee members, and hundreds of thousands of dollars contributed to Radiothons and campaigns to protect and develop ethnic broadcasting.

3ZZ became an everyday issue and concern for the ethnic community. Excitement and expectation were very high. With the closure of 3ZZ, the community worked tirelessly to accommodate ethnic programs in 3CR, and later played a significant role in the establishment of 3ZZZ whilst fighting to maintain and democratise SBS Radio. 3ZZ had set the foundations for community involvement and management that ultimately carried through to 3ZZZ and all community broadcasting.

== Governance ==
3ZZZ's broadcasting licence is owned and operated by the Ethnic Community Broadcasting Association of Victoria Limited, also called ECBAV. As a not-for-profit organisation, the ECBAV members elect a Committee of Management ('The Council') from amongst the members to provide governance and direction in the policies and strategic direction of the station. As such, the station is independent of government and business and operates democratically. The station was originally created for the Melbourne ethnic community to hear their own languages and maintain their cultural identities.

== Station aims ==
63 ethnic groups are affiliated with the station with more than 400 trained volunteers broadcasting in their own language, for and on behalf of the community. 3ZZZ enables participants to:

- Broadcast in community languages
- Promote culture and language

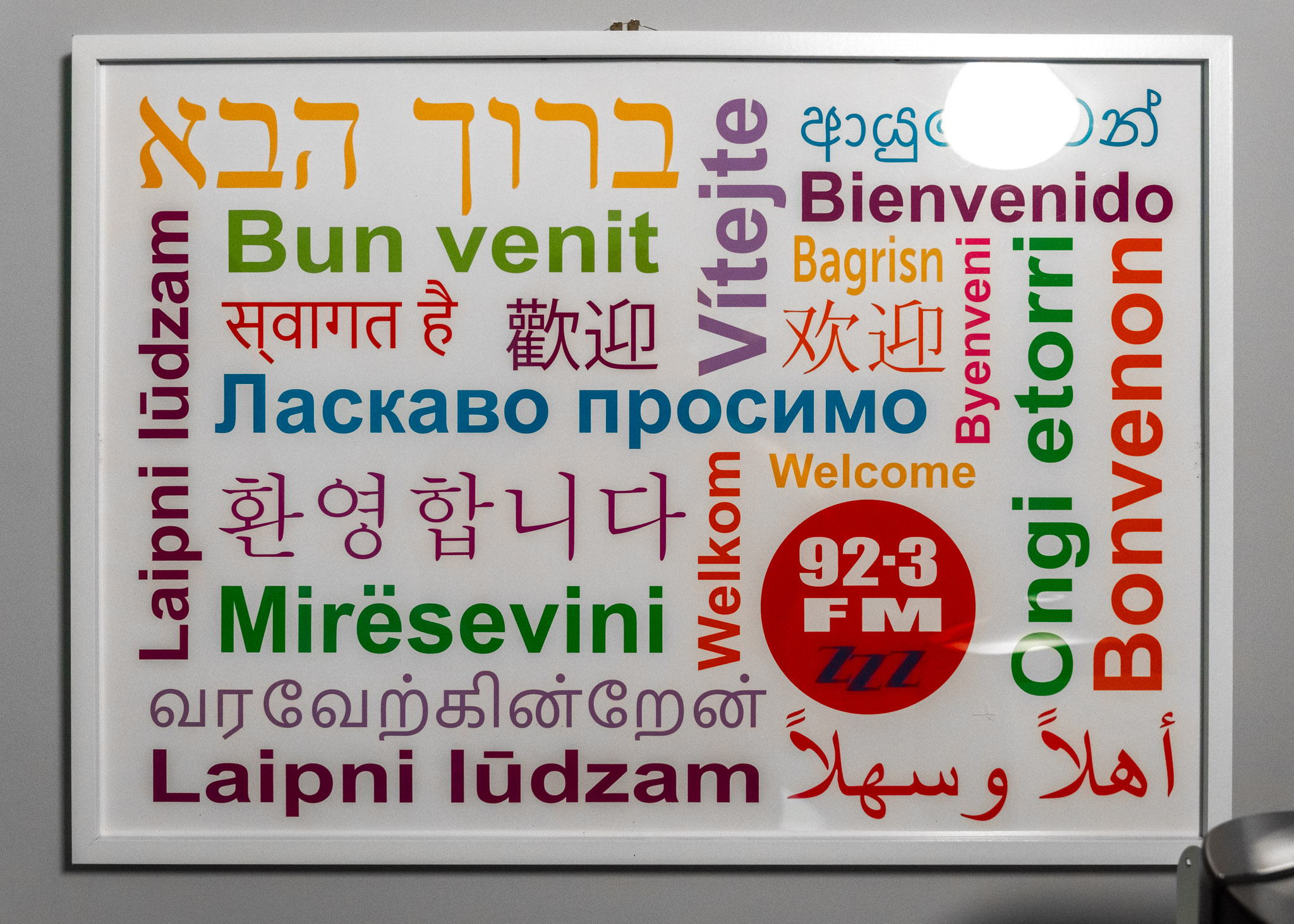
Plaque displaying different languages at 3ZZZ Melbourne Ethnic Community Radio

=== Languages ===
3ZZZ broadcasts in the following languages:

- Afghan (in Dari and Pashto)
- Albanian
- Arabic Family (in Arabic and English)
- Armenian
- Assyrian
- Austrian
- Bengali
- Bharat (in Sanskrit and Telugu)
- Bosnian
- Cambodian/Khmer
- Chinese
- Coptic
- Croatian
- Cypriot Greek
- Cypriot Turkish
- Dutch
- Egyptian (in Arabic and English)
- Esperanto
- Filipino
- German
- Greek
- Harari
- Hmong
- Hindi/Indian
- Indonesian
- Iraqi
- Irish
- Italian
- Japanese
- Jewish (in Hebrew and Yiddish)
- Lao
- Latvian
- Lebanese
- Macedonian
- Malay/Malaysian
- Maltese
- Mauritian (in French and Mauritian Creole)
- Oromo
- Persian
- Polish
- Punjabi
- Romanian
- Russian
- Scottish Gaelic
- Serbian
- Sinhalese
- Slovenian
- Spanish
- Sudanese
- Syrian
- Tamil
- Tigrinya
- Turkish
- Ukrainian
- Vietnamese

3ZZZ also features other community access broadcasts including specific youth programs in some of the languages above, namely Coptic, Punjabi and Sinhalese, BBC World Service, Classical Flamenco, a show that plays classical flamenco, Polyfonix, a youth show and Women's World, a women's show that is broadcast in English.

== Funding, training and community support ==
The radio station is financed by membership fees and listener donations during the annual 'Radiothon', company sponsorship and by grants from Community Broadcasting Foundation. 3ZZZ offers free training to broadcasters. One training program, called 'Starting Out' specifically targeted asylum seekers and former refugees. Trainees broadcast in Dinka (Sudan), Khmer (Cambodia), Swahili (Kenya) and Ghanaian languages. The 'Starting Out' training project ran from 2006 to mid-2008, assisted by project funding from the City of Yarra. Recent language groups to be added the 3ZZZ programming grid include the Karen peoples from southern and southeastern Myanmar (Burma).

== Polyfonix ==
Polyfonix is 3ZZZ's Multicultural Youth Program broadcasting Saturday nights from 10 pm to 11 pm.

Broadcasters are from a range of different ethnically, culturally and linguistically diverse backgrounds. They are influenced by their own backgrounds and also, of course, by the Australian ethos and culture. They include David Shen (Chinese), Rubal Sachdeva (Indian) and Jag Shergill (Punjabi).

=== Program history ===
The program was founded in 2004 as a station initiative with the aim of increasing youth involvement in the radio station and also the community ethnic radio sector.

Much of the program's success is credited to Maureen O'Keefe (3ZZZ Manager at the time), Claudine Ellis (3ZZZ Youth Officer at the time) and also founding members Jagdeep (Jag) Shergill (3ZZZ Youth Representative/3ZZZ Punjabi Group), Tina Marusic (3ZZZ Croatian Group) and Tewell Gwargis (3ZZZ Assyrian Group).

== See also ==
- National Ethnic and Multicultural Broadcasters Council (NEMBC)
- Community Broadcasting Association of Australia (CBAA)
- Community Broadcasting Foundation (CBF)
- Special Broadcasting Service (SBS)
