= 2NCR =

Coordinates: 28.812725°S 153.278721°E

- Lismore, New South Wales, Australia; Australia
- Frequency: 92.9 MHz

Programming
- Format: Diverse
- Affiliations: CBAA

Ownership
- Owner: North Coast Radio Inc

History
- Call sign meaning: 2 North Coast Radio

Technical information
- Facility ID: Parrots Nest, NSW, Australia
- Class: Community
- ERP: 500 w

Links
- Website: http://www.2ncr.org.au

2NCR is amongst the earliest licensed non-metropolitan FM community radio stations in New South Wales, Australia and it is based in Lismore.

The station has been operating since 1976 and is a not-for-profit member based incorporated association.

== About ==
The licence for the station was originally issued to the nearby Northern Rivers College of Advanced Education, however with the re-structure of the university system in the late 1990s, the university became a campus of the newly established Southern Cross University. This new university was not interested in maintaining its broadcast licence - thus a new association was formed to take over control of the community licence. This association was North Coast Radio Inc.

The 2NCR call sign has been used without interruption since inception, and is still the official call sign for the station today. More recently, 2NCR had rebranded to 92.9 FM (2NCR).

2NCR features many community radio program elements, including interview programs, non-English languages, specialist music programs and news. The genre based music programs presented by the station include Blues, Jazz, Indigenous, and country music. The station is operated mostly by volunteers, producing programs and program content that overall provides for a diverse range of music tastes, while also providing local news & information and details on local events.

The station's news is provided by the community radio news service National Radio News (or NRN).

== Northern Rivers Gaywaves ==
A notable former show on the station was Northern Rivers Gaywaves, which was dedicated to LGBTQI+ listeners, and it ran from 1983 until approximately 1987. It was hosted by Mike Bray and Vera Bourne and they saw it as a way to link LGBTQI+ people living rurally when they couldn't access physical hubs. The show started broadcast in the same week that another show on the station broadcast a homophobic tirade and, in response to the new show, they received overwhelming support from the community.

In taking the name 'Gaywaves' the hosts were honouring the Sydney program Gaywaves, hosted by 2SER, which broadcast between 1979 and 2005.

Papers collected by Bourne relating to the show and LGBTQI+ advocacy in the region are held by the Australian Queer Archives.
