= Maureen Watson =

Australian Indigenous rights activist (1931–2009)

- Born: 9 November 1931; Rockhampton, Queensland, Australia
- Died: 4 January 2009 (aged 77); Stradbroke Island, Queensland, Australia
- Other name: Aunty Maureen Watson

Maureen Watson, also known as "Aunty Maureen" (9 November 1931 – 4 January 2009), was an Aboriginal Australian activist actor, vocalist, writer, musician, and storyteller.

== Early life and education ==
Maureen Watson was born on 9 November 1931, in Rockhampton, Queensland, her mother's Kungulu country and attended school in the Dawson Valley, where she involved herself heavily in sport. In 1944, at the age of 13, she was forced to leave her education after obtaining a serious injury falling off a horse. During adolescence, she worked alongside her father and developed skills in shooting kangaroos, trapping dingos, mustering, droving and branding cattle, picking cotton, planting seed crops, driving tractors and bulldozing. Throughout her childhood, her family and visitors talked of political and social issues, which with her natural storytelling ability, assisted her in the rest of her life.

In 1952, at the age of 21, Watson married Harold Bayles, a Wakka Wakka man from Eidsvold, Queensland. Together they had five sons and, in 1970 together with her family, she moved to Brisbane. She joined the growing Aboriginal rights movement and commenced an arts degree at the University of Queensland.

== Political activism ==
In 1982, along with her brother, Ross Watson attended and was at the forefront of the Aboriginal protests at the Commonwealth Games in Brisbane. The protesters gathered and marched in Musgrave Park in South Brisbane, because they wanted the Aborigines Act 1971 removed, as Queensland was the last state to retain it. Hundreds of people were arrested, including Maureen who was arrested three times.

== Career ==
=== Books ===
Watson produced an audiobook of numerous children's stories in 1994, called From Dreamtime to Spaceships. She created a children's picture book, Kaiyu's Waiting: An Aboriginal Story, illustrated by David Verral, and published in 1984.

=== Poetry ===
Watson had a strong interest in both theatre and poetry. This helped her create numerous pieces of poetry, her first collection being published in 1982. In her poetry, she describes how Aboriginal people are viewed by the rest of society as well as how they view the modern world.

- Black Child, written in 1977, poetry
- I Too Am Human, written in 1977, poetry
- Black Reflections, written in 1982, short stories and poetry
- Memo to J.C, written in 1988, poetry
- Female of the Species, written in 1988, poetry
- Stepping Out, written in 1988, poetry
- Don't Bash the Loving Out of Me, written in 1995, poetry
- Kangaroo, Kangaroo, Where Have You Been? : Nursery Rhymes and Storytelling, written in 1999, an autobiography poetry prose dreaming story

=== Theatre ===
In 1972, Watson participated in the Six Weeks Performing Arts Training Programme held in Redfern, that later led to the establishment of NAISDA Dance College, among other things. She was involved in the theatre industry as an actor, vocalist, narrativist, adaptor and writer. Performances took her on tours throughout Queensland, New South Wales and Victoria as well as other places around the globe. The plays she contributed to include:

- Vocalist in “New Sky”, October 1983, performed at Playhouse, Newcastle, New South Wales
- Narrated in "Mundu Nyuringu", 1983, a film by Robert Bropho
- Acted in "Honey Spot", July 1988, performed at Cremorne Theatre, South Brisbane, Queensland as well as numerous other theatres through New South Wales and Victoria
- Adaptor in "You Came to My Country But You Didn't Turn Black", 1990, performed at the Queensland Museum, in South Bank, Queensland
- Wrote "Through Murri Eyes", September 1992, performed at the Jagera Arts Centre, South Brisbane, Queensland
- Acted in "Little White Dress", June 1996, performed at Performing Arts Centre, Southbank, Queensland
- Wrote and acted in "Kickin' Up the Dust", May 1998, performed at Swinburne University, Hawthorn, Victoria

== Community contributions ==
=== Gallery ===
In 1981, she moved to Sydney, where she set up the Aboriginal people's gallery in Redfern. It was difficult to get permission for the gallery. The shop was not aimed at making a profit, it was more for those who wanted to put their work on display and to express who they are through their art work.

=== Radio ===
Watson was a driving force behind the development of the indigenous broadcasting in Sydney community radio. With her son, Tiga Bayles, she laid the foundation of Radio Redfern in 1981. Radio Redfern was allowed 10 hours of airtime weekly. Radio Skid Row gave them this opportunity because they were allocated a community broadcasting licence in 1984. The station was initially broadcast from the University of Sydney, but then later moved to a terrace house on Cope Street in Redfern, still under the license of 2RSR. The station was considered the voice for Aboriginal people in Sydney. In 1988 it played a big role in co-ordinating political protests against the Bicentennial celebrations and Aboriginal deaths in custody in the early 1990s. Radio Redfern grew to have 40 broadcast hours each week, with all the announcers contributing their time voluntarily. Maureen also briefly broadcast a show called Black Perspectives, focused on Aboriginal Women, on 2SER.

=== Sisters Inside ===
An experienced and qualified neuro-linguistic programming counsellor, Watson worked with Sisters Inside, an independent support group for women in prison.

== Recognition and awards ==
Watson was the recipient of numerous honours, including the United Nations Association of Australia Global Leadership Prize in 1996, for her labour in contributing to creating a cross-cultural understanding and harmony amongst the community.

In 1996, in recognition of her national and international contribution towards bringing awareness to Aboriginal arts, she was presented the Australia Council's Red Ochre Award, which is presented to an outstanding Aboriginal Australian or Torres Strait Islander artist for lifetime achievement.

On 9 November 2024, a Google Doodle celebrated what would have been her 93rd birthday.

== Death ==
On 4 January 2009, at approximately 3 pm, Watson had a stroke which proved fatal. In the days before her death, she spent time with her 24 grandchildren and numerous great grandchildren on Stradbroke Island. Her funeral service took place on 12 January 2009 at Murri School in Acacia Ridge, Queensland.
