= Daniel Ahern =

Australian recording artist (born 1993)

- Born: Daniel John-Paul Poggi Ahern; 1992 or 1993 (age 32–33); Sydney, New South Wales, Australia
- Occupations: Musician; radio programme director; entertainment lawyer; journalist
- Years active: 2012–present
Daniel Ahern
- Also known as: Bus Vipers
- Origin: Canberra, Australian Capital Territory, Australia
- Genres: Power pop; garage pop
- Occupation: Musician
- Instruments: Guitar, vocoder, drums
- Years active: 2013–2017
- Label: Future Classic

Daniel John-Paul Poggi Ahern (born 1992 or 1993), is a media manager. He was a recording artist who performed and released material as Bus Vipers from 2012 to 2017. His career in radio includes stints as acting music director at 2SER (2015–2017) and programme director at FBi Radio (2017–2020).

== Biography ==
Daniel John-Paul Poggi Ahern, was born in Sydney in 1992 or 1993. His father, Steve Ahern is the founding editor of radioinfo.com.au and was Head of Radio at Australian Film, Television and Radio School (AFTRS). While a teenager Ahern had been a bass guitarist for Chevaliers, which disbanded when he started Higher School Certificate (HSC). He completed HSC at Saint Ignatius' College, Riverview in 2010. He undertook a music career beginning with a band, the Bus Vipers in 2012. Vipers, as a solo multi-instrumentalist, was signed to Australian record label, Future Classic in 2017. He is an ambassador for alopecia universalis, which features prominently in his video clips, including "Fluid".

While living in Canberra and starting his law studies at Australian National University in 2011, Ahern met a drummer, Henry. In the following year they formed a group, the Bus Vipers, with Ahern on lead vocals and guitar, Henry on drums and Max Fedoseev on bass guitar. They issued a single, "Moonrocks" (October 2012), and followed with "Magnetic" and "Louis Theroux" by late 2012. Other members of the group included Victor Rufus on guitar and Rhys Lintern on drums.

Bus Vipers became a solo effort in the following year, when he independently released his debut single, "Lonely Ghost". He cites David Longstreth of Dirty Projectors as an inspiration, especially that group's album, Bitte Orca (2009). "Lonely Ghost" was picked up by Triple J's Unearthed for high rotation. The song was described as having "broken guitar pedals, faint vocoder, and 909 drum sounds." He followed with a second single, "Orby". Triple J Unearthed listed Vipers at No. 20 of their 2013 Top 50 Most Played Artists.

Ahern holds two degrees, Bachelor of Arts and Bachelor of Laws, from the University of New South Wales. He clerked at entertainment law firm Media Arts Lawyers in Sydney, worked for Richard Ackland's publications Justinian and The Gazette of Law and Journalism. Ahern was the assistant/acting music director at Sydney radio station 2SER from 2015 to 2017. At 2SER he was also host of New Music with Daniel Ahern during 2017. He became the programme director of FBi Radio in Sydney, from November 2017 until mid-2020.

In June 2017 Bus Vipers was a support act for D.D Dumbo. His debut six-track extended play, Federal Highway, was released on 8 September 2017, which received widespread play on Australian community radio, and on national youth radio, Triple J. To avoid a conflict of interest Ahern asked his 2SER boss, Andrew Khedoori, to decide whether Federal Highway should be on the station's play list, Khedoori agreed to add its tracks. Danielle Kfare of BroadwayWorld observed, "[it is] filled with melodic power-pop, kaleidoscopic textures, electronic flourishes, garage rock and funk pulses." Tone Deaf's Aeron Clark provided "This Week's 8 Best Australian Bands" in October and reviewed the track, "Fluids", "[his] skilfully executed brand of garage-pop is a heady experience and this song in particular is strikingly euphoric."

The EP was preceded by two video-clips "CSIRO Weeds" (July 2017) and "Fluid" (August); both directed by Prue Stent and Honey Long. "CSIRO Weeds" was described by Purple Sneakers' Lloyd Crackett as "chock full of effects and noises that distort and flurry...a wonderful release and this is all before talking about the music video." Jonny Nail of Rolling Stone Australia felt "Fluid" is "a unique visual embracement of his alopecia...that embraces both the clinically precise nature of the clip and it's [sic] strange subject focus, saddling the fidelity border between bedroom lo fi and studio shine as Ahern's soothing vocals dissect the psych-pop clutter." The EP was toured around Australia in October and November 2017 in support of the Belligerents.

== Discography ==
=== Extended plays ===
- Federal Highway (8 September 2017) – Future Classic/Universal Music (FCL204)/(539211).

=== Singles ===
- "Moonrocks" (October 2012)
- "Magnetic" (late 2012)
- "Louis Theroux" (late 2012)
- "Lonely Ghost" (2013)
- "Orby" (2013)
- "CSIRO Weeds" (July 2017)
- "Fluid" (August 2017)
- "Palace" (2017)
