= Steve Ahern =

Australian media executive (born 1959)

Steve Ahern OAM
- Born: Stephen Roderick Ahern; 1959 (age 66–67)
- Occupation: Media executive

Stephen Roderick Ahern (OAM) (born 1959) is an Australian media executive, strategist, trainer and international consultant in modern broadcast media. He was the station manager at three Australian Broadcasting Corporation (ABC) radio stations (1988 to mid-1990s), Director of Radio at Australian Film, Television and Radio School (AFTRS) (1998 to 2009) and CEO of Ahern Media & Training (AMT) (from mid-1990s). His Order of Australia Medal, awarded in the Queen's Birthday honours list June 2009, recognised his "contributions to radio broadcasting as an educator, media trainer and author".

== Biography ==
Stephen Roderick Ahern was born in 1959. He completed a Bachelor of Arts/Diploma of Education at Macquarie University in 1982. He had started his career in radio in the late 1970s and by 1987 was acting station manager at Australian Broadcasting Corporation's (ABC's) Canberra-based 2CN and 2CY. He became 2CN's manager in the following year and had previously managed 2NC, Newcastle. After six years at 2CN, in 1993, Ahern became manager of Melbourne's 3LO. From 1997 to 2009, he worked for Australian Film, Television and Radio School (AFTRS), and was its Director of Radio for ten years, in 2020 he took on the role of Director of the ABU Media Academy in Kuala Lumpur. Ahern was awarded an Order of Australia medal in 2009 "for his contributions to radio broadcasting as an educator, media trainer and author".

After leaving the ABC in the mid-1990s, Ahern founded Ahern Media and Training (AMT) and soon after he established the website, radioinfo.com.au. AMT publishes several trade journals. He consulted as a media futurist, advising broadcasters how to adapt to the new smartphone, smart speaker, podcast and social media environments, as well as advising on how to restructure radio and television media companies in the new digital media era. His presentations and articles include how media can be useful in fighting fake news, radio in media-dark countries journalism in dangerous environments and media reform in Australia. Ahern works with TV, radio and new media broadcasters to modernise their news gathering and broadcasting techniques and consults on organisational change for various international broadcasting and publishing organisations. In 2018, Ahern developed a successful business news-talk station called Money FM for commercial radio and publishing company SPH Singapore.

Ahern has commented in the media about the radio industry in Australia. He is the editor and an author of the book, Making Radio: a Practical Guide to Working in Radio (2000), which was published by his organisation, AFTRS. (2nd Edition 2011, 3rd Edition 2013). In 2022, the book was updated to an international edition, include podcasting and digital audio and is now called Making Radio and Podcasts, published by Routledge. Ahern wrote a crime thriller, Harbour Terror (2007), which is set in a community radio station. He provided an entry on the first Director of AFTRS, Jerzy Toeplitz (1909–1995), for the Australian Dictionary of Biography and contributed two chapters to a book about South African media. Using his technology experience, he regularly also writes about new technology in publishing, media and AI, and contributes to media technology policy debates.

Ahern has published articles and conference papers on the future of media, including the importance of Media Literacy in developing countries. He trains media professionals through AMT and was the CEO of the International Media & Broadcasting Academy (IMBA). He was a board member of the Community Broadcasting Foundation of Australia. In 2000, he was the founding consultant and curriculum developer for the National Electronic Media Institute of South Africa (NEMISA) and in 2012 was founding consultant for Nai Media Institute, the first professional media training organisation in Afghanistan. In 2014 Ahern and business partner Peter Saxon bought AsiaRadioToday.com and in 2015 he and his business partners were the first to develop and launch a 'catch-up radio' product called Rewind Radio.

Ahern has been active in training radio and television industry organisations for the transition to digital radio, digital television, and new OTT services. He worked on various media aid projects, consulting to develop independent media publishing companies in countries including Afghanistan, South Sudan and Liberia. He lectures about the future of media, media peace initiatives, broadcasting and media literacy in Australia and internationally. In 2020 joined the Asia Pacific Broadcasting Union (ABU) to Head the organisation's ABU Media Academy and work with UNESCO on various media peace projects.

In Paris in July 2022, he spoke at a UNESCO presentation on the importance of Media and Information Literacy (MIL) and professional journalism. Highlighting the difference between professional media and social media he said: "The common threads that make up professional media are: A commitment to the greater good of society, Internal editorial checks and balances, External rules and regulations... This distinguishes responsible professional media from unregulated social media".

In 2022, Ahern joined at ABC as Manager of ABC Radio Sydney. He left the ABC in 2024 to rejoin AMT Pty Ltd as the company's CEO to expand the company's trade publications, launch the Asia Podcast Awards, work on the Radiodays Asia Conference, head the jury for the Global Media Peace Awards and continue his international training and consultancy work. In 2025, Ahern's company joined with publisher Mumbrella to introduce the Australian Audio Awards after the commercial radio industry's awards were cancelled.

== Personal life ==
Steve Ahern is married to Serena (née Poggi), a teacher-librarian at Saint Ignatius' College, Riverview, and they have two children. One of their children is Daniel Ahern p.k.a. Bus Vipers, who also worked in radio management at 2SER and then FBi Radio.
