= National Radio News =

Australian radio news service

- Type: Community radio network and news agency
- Branding: National Radio News
- Country: Australia
- First air date: July 16, 1997
- Headquarters: Bathurst, New South Wales
- Broadcast area: Australia-wide
- Owner: Charles Sturt University
- Webcast: Listen live
- Official website: arts-ed.csu.edu.au/NRN

National Radio News is an independent national news service for the community broadcasting sector of Australia. It is produced by Charles Sturt University with the support of the Community Broadcasting Foundation (CBF). The service is distributed by the Community Broadcasting Association of Australia (CBAA).

National Radio News (NRN) bulletins are produced from a newsroom based at radio station 2MCE on the Bathurst campus of Charles Sturt University. Professional journalists work alongside students drawn from Charles Sturt's Bachelor of Communication to deliver news bulletins to over 1.5 million listeners a week across Australia.

NRN broadcasts can be heard on community radio stations across Australia and via the Community Radio Plus mobile app.

== History ==
Development of National Radio News was led by former 2MCE-FM Manager Ian Stanistreet OAM in 1997. 2MCE at Charles Sturt University and 2NUR at the University of Newcastle formed a joint venture to deliver the news service.

In 1998, 2MCE and 2NUR jointly received the prestigious Tony Staley Award for Excellence in Community Broadcasting in recognition of their work launching NRN.

2NUR withdrew from the consortium in 2000, focusing on local news for Newcastle and the Hunter region. 2MCE and Charles Sturt University continued operating National Radio News. The CBAA distributes the service to community radio stations through the Community Radio Network.
