= Optus Aurora =

Defunct satellite television service in Australia

Optus Aurora was a free-to-view satellite television platform in Australia, which aimed at providing television and radio services to remote and black spot areas using the Optus C1 and B3 satellites. The service was available in all areas, using a standard satellite dish and set top box, however commercial stations carried on the platform were restricted to their respective coverage areas.

Aurora replaced the analogue Homestead and Community Broadcast Satellite Service (HACBSS) in late 1998. HACBSS, carried on the Optus B1 satellite, was originally launched in the 1980s, and was in many areas the first means of receiving television signals.

The Viewer Access Satellite Television (VAST) was launched in 2010, as a replacement for Optus Aurora, and now provides a full range of digital channels. Aurora ceased transmission in December 2013, with the last Aurora uplink taking place during February 2014.

== Services ==
=== Television ===
The remote area broadcast services carried on the platform comprised the major terrestrial networks available in the service's two main coverage areas – remote and regional Western Australia, and remote central and eastern Australia.

ABC TV and SBS was available in all areas with the use of a smartcard, however commercial stations were only available to viewers in their respective coverage areas – GWN and WIN WA to regional Western Australia, and Imparja Television and Southern Cross Central to remote viewers in central and eastern Australia.

The multichannels of the broadcasters were not available on the service.

Indigenous broadcaster National Indigenous Television (NITV) and WA government service Westlink Network were also available on Aurora, in addition to some wagering channels from Sky Racing.

=== Radio ===
A number of remote commercial and indigenous stations broadcast on Aurora, as did a few in-store radio services.

Most of the Australian Broadcasting Corporation's radio networks were carried on the platform. SBS Radio's national network was carried for five time zones. SBS Radio 1, SBS Radio 2 and ABC DiG was not carried by Aurora, but they were available on FTA Ku-Band on Optus D1.

The Australian government's Community Broadcasting Foundation broadcast a number of services on the platform including the BBC World Service, National Indigenous Radio Service, Vision Australia Radio and the Community Radio Network.

Coles Supermarkets, Officeworks and Kmart Australia also used the Aurora service to broadcast their in-store radio to different locations in Australia.

== See also ==
- Viewer Access Satellite Television
- Regional television in Australia
- Television in Australia
- Television broadcasting in Australia
