= Community Radio Network =

A community radio network is any network of radio stations set up to serve local communities.

Community Radio Network may refer specifically to:

- Community Radio Network (Australia), a satellite program feed managed by the Community Broadcasting Association of Australia
- The Community Broadcasting Association of Australia, a group of community access radio stations in Australia
- Community Radio Network (New Zealand), a former network of New Zealand radio stations owned by New Zealand Media and Entertainment
- The Association of Community Access Broadcasters, a group of community access radio stations in New Zealand
- In the UK there is the UK Community Radio Network, a group of Ofcom licensed Community Radio Stations that represents, supports and develop the sector, they work in partnership with the Welsh Community Radio Network
