= Melanie Withnall =

Australian journalist

- Education: University of Technology Sydney, AFTRS
- Occupations: Journalist, Producer, Manager
- Years active: 2000 - present

Melanie Withnall is an Australian journalist, producer and manager.

She has been the Managing Director of 2SER FM, Manager of ABC Radio Sydney and Head of News and Information at Southern Cross Austereo.

== Career ==
Withnall graduated from a Bachelor of Communications/Bachelor of International Studies at the University of Technology Sydney in 2002, a Graduate Diploma in Commercial Radio Broadcasting at the Australian Film Television and Radio School in 2003 and a Masters of Arts in International Studies (Russian) from the University of Technology Sydney in 2006.

Withnall began her radio career at 2UE as a Producer and then Executive Producer of the Stan Zemanek Program from 2003-2006.

Withnall was appointed Senior Producer for Mornings with Deborah Cameron on ABC Radio Sydney from 2008 - 2011.

Withnall was appointed Managing Director of 2SER FM from 2011-18. During this time Withnall lead the development of podcasting for the station, including award winning series like the Think series with academics from UTS and Macquarie University.

Withnall was appointed Manager of ABC Radio Sydney from 2018- 2021.

Withnall was appointed head of News and Information at SCA from 2024.

== Awards ==
Community Broadcasting Association of Australia Station Leadership Award in 2018

Tony Staley Award for ‘Excellence in Community Broadcasting’ in 2015

New York Festivals Radio Award - Best Mornings/Drive programming

Amnesty International Media Award - 2017

== Other Positions Held ==
New York Festivals Radio Awards member of Grand Jury, 2018

Community Broadcasting Association of Australia Vice President
