= Australian Indigenous Communications Association =

The Australian Indigenous Communications Association (AICA) is the peak body for Australia's Aboriginal and Torres Strait Islander broadcasters. It is the successor to the National Indigenous Media Association of Australia (NIMAA).

== History ==
AICA, founded in 2003, is the third of a series of peak national representative bodies created to represent Indigenous media producers in Australia. The first of these was the National Aboriginal and Islander Broadcasting Association (NAIBA), which was mainly an advocacy body, operating from 1982 to 1985 until federal funding dried up. One of its founders was Tiga Bayles.

The National Indigenous Media Association of Australia (NIMAA) was established in 1992, with its membership spanning urban, regional and remote community broadcasters and multimedia producers across the country. It created policy relating to a variety of Indigenous media, including film, advertising, print, radio and television. In 1994, members included broadcasting entities in around 80 remote Indigenous communities and about 50 additional community groups which broadcast on local radio across the country. NIMAA encouraged and provided support to Indigenous broadcasters to use new technology in production such as video-conferencing and digital video editing, while incorporating their own cultural protocols.

NIMAA ceased operations in 2001, at which time an Indigenous Communication Consultative Committee was set up in order to participate in the lobbying process for a national Indigenous broadcasting service. The Indigenous Remote Communications Association (IRCA, now First Nations Media Australia) was set up in October 2001, to allow voices in remote communities to have their say in the discussions.

In 2003 the Australian Indigenous Communications Association was launched, in the same year that the federal government split the powers of the Aboriginal and Torres Strait Islander Commission (ATSIC).

In 2004 the independent Indigenous Community Television (ICTV) service was established to serve the needs of remote communities, but was taken off air in July 2007 when the government decided to establish the new National Indigenous Television (NITV) service.

== Description ==
AICA aims to represent all Indigenous people and organisations in media, communications and broadcasting, including print, film, television, online and radio.

It develops national policy and as of 2021 represents the interests of 130 Indigenous media outlets all around Australia, including in remote areas, as well as individual members.

== Governance and funding ==
AICA is governed by a board of nationally elected representatives, who include experts from each of the mediums, a remote sector representative and four executive office members.

As of 2008 the AICA received the bulk of its funds from the Australian Government through the Department of Environment, Water, Heritage and the Arts.

== See also ==
- Central Australian Aboriginal Media Association
- Community Broadcasting Association of Australia
- Community Broadcasting Foundation
- National Indigenous Radio Service
