= First Media =

First Media may refer to:

- Digital First Media, an American newspaper publisher
- First Media (Indonesian media company)

== See also ==
- First Look Media, an American non-profit media organization
- First Meditation
- First Nations Media Australia
