= FBi Radio =

Community radio station in Sydney, Australia

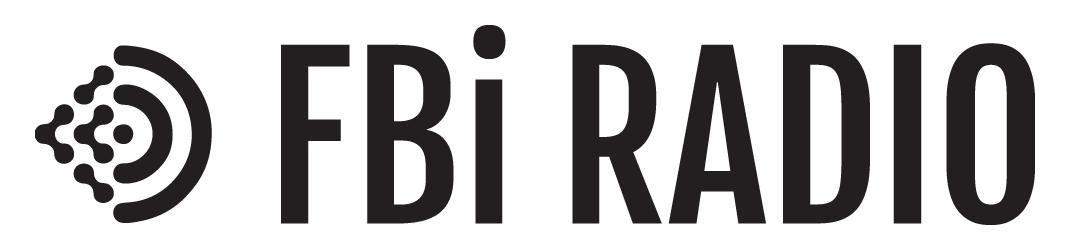
- Sydney; Australia
- Frequency: 94.5 FM

Programming
- Format: 50% Australian music, half of that from Sydney.
- Affiliations: CBAA

Ownership
- Owner: Free Broadcast Inc.

History
- First air date: 29 August 2003
- Call sign meaning: 2=New South Wales; Free; Broadcast; Incorporated

Technical information
- Class: Community
- ERP: 10 kW

Links
- Website: www.fbi.radio

FBi (call sign: 2FBI) station is an independent, not-for-profit community radio in Sydney, Australia. FBi places a heavy emphasis on local emerging music: it has a policy that at least 50 per cent of its music content is to be Australian, of which at least half comes from Sydney musicians.

== History ==
FBi began 'test broadcasting' as an 'aspirant broadcaster' in 1995 following the then-Keating government's decision to allocate the last three FM licences in Sydney. The election of John Howard delayed the process as the Coalition government focused on radio licences for country towns. After making a series of short-term broadcasts over eight years, FBi Radio beat 16 other aspirant broadcasters to be granted a permanent licence by the Australian Broadcasting Authority in 2002.

Popular dance and hip hop aspirant station DEX FM were unsuccessful and FBi President Cassandra Wilkinson invited DEX founder George Crones to join the FBi board and merge the two stations.

A failed takeover attempt by one of the losing bidders for the permanent licence, Wild FM (a more commercially oriented dance music station) pushed FBi's full-time 24/7 broadcast to August 2003. At the launch, company President Cassandra Wilkinson told radioinfo that FBi 94.5FM aims to "celebrate the creativity and diversity of the city’s music and arts communities."

The station went to air with program director Meagan Loader and station manager Christina Alvarez in charge with Australia's youngest Music Director Dan Zilber calling the tunes.

In November 2006, FBi's 'Sunset' program won the Best Radio Show award at the national Australian Dance Music Awards.

In September 2007, the Australian Labor Party chose FBi as the platform to announce its electoral commitment to resume funding for the Australian Music Radio Airplay Project.

In 2009, FBi asked listeners to ask Richard Branson to donate $1 million to the station, with the person getting his attention being promised $50k if he came through with the goods.... A young Australian woman swam to his house on Necker Island to inform him of the campaign and Branson called the station to chat on air to broadcaster Alison Piotrowski. While Branson did not pay up the $1 million he did donate prizes to the Save FBi campaign which raised nearly $500,000 to save the station from the drop in membership and revenues during the 2008 financial crisis.

During mid-2014, FBi Radio officially launched FBi Click - a second station dedicated to dance and electronic music. FBi Click broadcast on DAB+ in Sydney and via online stream at fbiradio.com/click. A number of Sydney dance music promoters and collectives presented shows on the station; including Picnic, Motorik, Purple Sneakers, THUMP by Vice and others. On 5 June 2017 FBi Click was discontinued, although many of the programs were merged back into the main FBI station's programming. The rationale for the change was that listeners wanted to hear the main FBi station on DAB+.

== Reach and format ==
FBi is Sydney's only independent youth radio station, broadcasting across the city with a signal strength as large as its commercial rivals - reaching Gosford, the Blue Mountains and Wollongong. A ratings survey conducted by McNair in 2019 showed that FBi's audience was 580,000 per month. Its music policy is 50% Australian, half of that from Sydney. The eclectic music mix that results is different from anything available through commercial music stations in Sydney.

== FBi SMAC Awards ==
The FBi Sydney Music, Arts & Culture (SMAC) Awards recognising Sydney musicians, artists, performers, restaurants and events. They are voted on by the public and presented in an annual ceremony. The 2022 event took place at the Powerhouse in Ultimo on 10 November 2022.

== Broadcasters ==
FBi broadcasters have included many individuals from the Australian music and entertainment industries including:

DJs & Musicians: Anna Lunoe, Nina Las Vegas, Ajax, Kid Kenobi, Mark Dynamix, Deepchild, Ro Sham Bo, Kato, Bad Ezzy, Pimmon (aka Paul Gough), Klue (True Vibenation), Johnny Segment (aka Timothy Neville), Peter Hollo, Al Grigg, Marcus Whale, Bruno Brayovic (Peabody); DOBBY, Mike Who (Planet Trip Records), Luke M de Zilva, Jaimee Taylor-Nielsen and Adi Toohey.

Broadcasting: Amelia Jenner; Avani Dias (Hack / Triple J); Lucy Smith (Triple J); Declan Byrne (Triple J); Ebony Boadu (Triple J); Alex Pye; Adam Lewis; Linda Marigliano (Triple J); Georgia Hitch (ABC); Lewis McKirdy (Triple J); SBS and Triple J film critic Marc Fennell; Jayne Cheeseman (Virgin Radio UK); comedian and filmmaker Dan Ilic (The Ronnie Johns Half Hour, Channel 10, AJ+); Nathan Sapsford (Video Hits, Channel 10); Jaimie Leonarder / Jay Katz (former SBS Film Critic); Dom Alessio (Triple J); Meagan Loader (Triple J); Dan Buhagiar (Triple J); CNET (Lexy Savvides); Shantan Wantan Ichiban (Triple J)

Industry: Dan Zilber, Programming Manager MTV Aus & NZ; Stuart Coupe (Laughing Outlaw); Anna Burns, General Manager Future Classic; Andrew Levins, co-founder of Diplo's 'Heaps Decent' label, DJ and promoter; GetUp Communication Director Matthew Levinson; Fat Planet & New Weird Australia editor Stuart Buchanan; Ben Marshall, Head of Contemporary Music at Sydney Opera House; Sweetie Zamora (Remote Control Records); Harry White (Future Classic), Melody Forghani (twntythree).

== Studios ==
The studios of FBi are located in Botany Rd., Alexandria, in the same building as the Community Broadcasting Association of Australia.

== Staff ==
FBi Radio is predominantly a volunteer-based organisation, augmented by a small core staff. All on-air presenters and producers are volunteers. It is a non-profit organisation with Deductible Gift Recipient (DGR) status. Co-founder and long-term Company President is Cassandra Wilkinson (2003–2021). She was replaced as president by Amy Solomon (2021–present).

Managing directors	Program directors	Music directors	Ref(s).
Christina Alvarez (2002–2004)	Meagan Loader (2003–2010)	Dan Zilber (2003–2013)	
Stuart Buchanan (2005–2007)	Caroline Gates (2010–2017)	Stephen Goodhew (2013–2017)	
Evan Kaldor (2008–2013)	Daniel Ahern (2017–2020)	Amelia Jenner (2017–2020)	
Clare Holland (2013–2018)	Amelia Jenner (2020)	Reg Harris (2021)	
Nikki Brogan (2018–2021)	Tanya Ali (2020–2021)		
Lewi McKirdy (2021)	Mija Healey (2022)		
Tanya Ali (2021–2024)	Darren Lesaguis (2022–2024)		
Tyson Koh (2025-present)	Tommy Boutros (2025-present)		
