= Works in Theory =

Australian radio program

Works in Theory was a radio program on SYN Radio and the Community Radio Satellite in Australia.

It was hosted and produced by Josh and Josh and featured punk, metal, ska, glam, goth rock and similar music. The show took a hiatus from 2007 until 2012 as the Joshes focused on other projects but returned as a weekly podcast that could be subscribed to via iTunes or their website. As of February 2016, both the podcasts and the website appear to be no longer active.

The show's hosts, Josh Fergeus and Josh Merriel, were known collectively as Josh and Josh, with aliases that varied during the show. Josh Fergeus was sometimes known as Mohawk Josh, Tall Josh, Slightly Effeminate Man and as Slightly Experimental Surgery Man during the horror special. Josh Merriel was sometimes known as Afro Josh, Captain Redbeard, Ex-Afro Josh and as Captain Bloodbeard during the horror special.

Since the end of their podcast the Joshes have pursued other projects, appearing together on Triple J from 2012 to 2014. Joshua "Redbeard" Merriel now hostsshort.fast.loud on Triple J, and Josh Fergeus is a CEO in the charity sector and an Australian Greens Councillor for the City of Monash.

== Segments ==
Former segments include:

=== Dr Josh ===
A cornerstone of the show since day one, and an audience favourite. Listeners send in text messages or phone in asking for advice, opinions and words of wisdom from experienced doctors, Josh & Josh - "we have medical certificates which we bought online for pretty cheap". Calls and messages range from the ridiculous to deadly serious.

=== Lest We Forget ===
At the end of every show, Josh & Josh used to play a vintage track that had inspired a lot of the music on Works In Theory over the years. Some bands and artists which have made appearances include The Doors, The Cars, The B-52s, The New York Dolls, MC5, David Bowie, Lou Reed, Midnight Oil, Tom Waits, and Pink Floyd.

=== The Adventures Of Captain Redbeard & Slightly Effeminate Man ===
The result of a competition held to give Josh & Josh superhero names, this segment was a weekly story played out in the hosts superhero personas. Some of their adventures include mowing the lawn, going to an Iggy Pop concert, and being elected Prime Minister of Australia.

=== Josh Vs. Josh ===
In this segment, an audience member would phone in and ask Josh & Josh five questions on a subject of the listener's choice, declaring one host that week's winner.

=== Helpful Hinty Handyman Hints Corner ===
A short lived but hugely popular segment, the Helpful Hinty Handyman Hints Corner saw Josh & Josh attempting to educated their audience about a particular 'blokey' pastime such as using a drill, fixing a car, and making love to a woman.

=== Believe It Or Else ===
Another shorter-lived segment, Believe It Or Else featured one of the Joshes unveiling his 'mystery' of the week. Subjects ranged from his ingrown toenail to the reasons for going to war in Iraq.

== Interviews ==
A common feature of the show is interviews with many bands of international renown. Bands that appeared on the program include:

- Nightwish
- The Presidents of the United States of America
- The Used
- Funeral for a Friend
- Killswitch Engage
- +44
- Story of the Year
- Children of Bodom
- Silverstein
- Flogging Molly
- DragonForce
- Wednesday 13
- Disturbed
- Max Cavalera
- Spiderbait
- Hatebreed
- Coheed and Cambria
- Angry Anderson
- Ross Wilson
- Parkway Drive
- Lamb of God
- DevilDriver
- Fear Factory
- Spiderbait
- Mushroomhead
- Stone Sour
- Municipal Waste
- Hawthorne Heights
- Avenged Sevenfold
- Kreator
- Ill Niño

== Awards ==
Works In Theory was nominated for two SYN awards in 2004:

- Most Improved Program

and

- Most Outstanding Genre Show: Punk & Metal

For achievements in 2005, Works In Theory won the SYN award for Most Outstanding Genre Program: Punk & Metal.
