= Yamba's Playtime =

1995–2022 Australian TV series

- Genre: Children's entertainment
- Starring: Yamba the Honeyant; Jacinta Price
- Opening theme: Yamba’s Playtime Theme Song "Yamba the Honeyant" written by Julie McAllan
- Country of origin: Australia
- Original languages: English; Warlpiri; Arrernte
- No. of series: 19

Production
- Producer: Julie McAllan
- Production location: Alice Springs
- Running time: 30 minutes

Original release
- Network: Imparja Television; Nine Network (2010-2012); 9Go! (2013-2016); National Indigenous Television (2013–present)
- Release: October 2, 1995 – 2022

Yamba's Playtime is an Australian children's preschool television program, produced and broadcast by Imparja Television from 1995 and since 2010 has also been broadcast by Nine Network Australia. Each 30 minute episode of Yamba's Playtime follows the life of Yamba the Yerrampe (or honey ant) and is the first indigenous themed preschool program to have received a "P" Classification.

Yamba the Honeyant is from Central Australia, and has a best friend named Jacinta. Yamba is very curious and loves to learn, is active and energetic, friendly and outgoing. Other characters on the show include Grandpa and Grandma Honeyant, Cecilina the Ballerina (Yamba's big sister) and Miss Honeypot (Cecilina's ballet teacher).

Every episode of Yamba's Playtime is educational yet entertaining and reflects distinctive qualities that can only be found in the red centre of Australia. It appeals to an indigenous and non-indigenous preschool audience as proven by the high rating of viewers who tuned into Series 1 in January 2012.

"What I love about Yamba’s Playtime, is that while it is primarily aimed at a young indigenous audience, with its energy, music, and sense of story fun it actually appeals to a much broader demographic. It’s enlightening on so many levels," said Cameron Clarke, former screenwriter of Hi 5.

Because of the massively popular preschool program, it was decided to use Yamba as a vehicle to present healthy messages to remote towns and communities. Yamba's Roadshow was created and in 2011 the Yamba Roadshow crew began travelling throughout the Northern Territory and continued into Queensland performing stage shows all about healthy living.

During the roadshows, Yamba is waved at in the streets, mobbed by fans, and treated like a celebrity. Before the performances, Yamba's name is always chanted over and over, in anticipation of the Honeyant Rockstar coming onto the stage.

== Characters ==
=== Yamba the Yerrampe ===
Yamba is a honey ant from Central Australia, and is played by a person in a honey ant suit. According to the Imparja website, Yamba is energetic, friendly, and loves to learn.

=== Jacinta ===
Jacinta is Yamba's best friend. She is human, and is played by Jacinta Price.

=== Chabba and Flopp ===
Chabba and Flopp are two imaginary socks created by Robbie.

=== Cecilina the Ballerina ===
Cecilina the Ballerina is Yamba's big sister. She loves ballet, fruit salad and visiting Yamba and Jacinta

=== Grandma & Grandpa Honeyant ===
Grandpa Honeyant is Yamba and Cecilina's grandfather. In Series 1 & 2 he has a segment called 'Grandpa Honeyant's Storytime'. Grandma Honeyant is Yamba and Cecilina's grandmother; she is a wise woman and loves her grandchildren.

=== Miss Honeypot ===
Miss Honeypot is Cecilina's Ballet Teacher.

== Episodes ==
=== Series 1 ===
Series 1 was first aired in January 2012 on the Nine Network and Imparja Television. It will be aired again late 2012 on both networks.

PGM1 3 Wishes Yamba the Honeyant finds a magic lamp and makes three ANTastic wishes.

PGM2 The Holiday Yamba takes best friend Jacinta on a holiday to an imaginary place called Yambaland.

PGM3 Superheroes Yamba the Superant's X-Ray vision glasses are lost and Jacinta helps to find them.

PGM4 Robots Yamba the Honeyant wants to be like the clown robot, Robbo the Robot, but Jacinta soon grows tired of all the jokes.

PGM5 It's Hot Today Yamba wants to play outside but it's too hot so best friend Jacinta shows Yamba many ways to keep cool.

PGM6 Magical Day Cecilina, Yamba's big sister, has disappeared and Yamba thinks a magic trick has made her disappear. Did Yamba make Cecilina disappear or make two Cecilinas reappear!

PGM7 The Treasure Map Grandpa Honeyant gave Yamba a map and Yamba and Jacinta think it's a treasure map. They have an antastic time trying to follow the directions.

PGM8 Communication Yamba has to send Cecilina a message quickly so Jacinta helps Yamba find ways to send a message.

PGM9 Wheels Go Round Jacinta helps Yamba try to find the right shape that fits a wheel on the toy train.

PGM10 Birthday Party It's Grandma Honeyant's birthday and Yamba comes up with a theme for a party but not everyone assumes it's the same theme as what Yamba has planned.

PGM11 Yamba Gets a Pet Yamba has had an antastic dream about owning a pet. Jacinta enjoys Yamba telling her all about the dream.

PGM12 The Desert Yamba has to sing a song about the desert for preschool so Jacinta helps Yamba to write the song.

PGM13 A Home Yamba is very cold so Jacinta shows how different homes keep animals warm by building them in the Playroom.

PGM14 Sports Day Yamba has been to a Preschool Sports Day and enjoyed being in various races. But how did Yamba's head get a big bandage around it?

=== Holiday Specials ===
These episodes have been aired on the Nine Network and Imparja Television for the holiday.

Yamba's Easter Adventure Enjoy an Easter holiday adventure with Yamba the Honeyant and Jacinta as they journey to Yambaland.

Yamba's Christmas Surprise Come on a fun, engaging and entertaining journey with Yamba the Honey Ant and discover what Yamba's Christmas surprise really is.
