= 2000FM (Sydney) =

Radio station in Sydney, Australia

Coordinates: 33.8787°S 151.1027°E

2000FM 98.5
- Australia
- Broadcast area: Sydney
- Frequency: 98.5 MHz FM

Programming
- Format: Multilingual programming
- Affiliations: HRR 98.5FM

Ownership
- Owner: Multicultural Community Radio Association Limited
- Sister stations: HRR 98.5FM

History
- First air date: 1994
- Call sign meaning: 2 = New South Wales with OOO to look like the number 2000

Technical information
- Class: Community radio

Links
- Website: Official website

2000FM (call sign 2OOO), also known as "radio-2-triple-o", is a multilingual community radio station broadcasting to Sydney in languages other than English from studios in the suburb of Burwood. It is a volunteer run organisation and is funded through listener support, grants and limited commercial sponsorship.

The mission of 2000FM is to provide a service through dedication to enrich the cohesion of our cultural diversity via tolerance, understanding and respect for each other.

== History ==
2000FM was established in 1992. It was granted a licence by the Australian Communications and Media Authority and commenced broadcasting in 1994.

== Programming ==
As of 2024, the station broadcasts in the following languages:

- Arabic
- Bengali
- Bosnian
- Burmese
- Cantonese
- Celtic
- Cook Island Maori
- Croatian
- Fijian
- Filipino
- Akan (Ghana)
- Greek
- Hindi
- Indonesian
- Irish Celtic
- Italian
- Korean
- Kurdish
- Macedonian
- Mandarin
- Marathi
- Mongolian
- Persian
- Polish
- Punjabi
- Russian
- Samoan
- Serbian
- Sinhalese
- Spanish
- Sudanese
- Tamil
- Telugu
- Thai
- Timorese
- Tongan
- Turkmen
- Ukrainian
- Urdu
- Vietnamese

2000FM also features other community access broadcasts including specific youth programs in some of the languages above, a weekly fashion and design show and Feathered Friends a program for bird fanciers.

HRR 98.5FM is a hard rock/heavy metal program on radio broadcasting from the studio of 2000FM. It first aired on 13 April 2008.

== See also ==
- List of radio stations in Australia
- National Ethnic and Multicultural Broadcasters Council
