= Tiga Bayles =

Australian radio presenter (1953–2016)

Harold James Phillip "Tiga" Bayles (6 October 1953 – 17 April 2016) was an Indigenous Australian radio presenter and activist. He was a descendant of the Birri Gubba and Gungalu nations of Queensland.

He was raised in Theodore, Queensland, the son of Maureen Watson.

== Career ==
With his mother, Bayles, who became known as Tiga, established Radio Redfern, an Indigenous radio program on Sydney community station Radio Skid Row. In 1982, he was involved with the Aboriginal movement protests around the 1982 Commonwealth Games. Both Tiga and Maureen Watson also appeared on 2SER.

He was chairman of the NSW Aboriginal Land Council and a key organiser of the Aboriginal Bicentennial protests in Sydney in 1988.

Moving back to Brisbane, Bayles helped establish the Brisbane Indigenous Media Association (BIMA), which operated the radio station 98.9 FM (Brisbane), with the guidance of his uncle Ross Watson. Bayles hosted the program Let's Talk, which discussed issues relevant to First Nations people.

He co-founded the Murri School in Acacia Ridge, and served as chair of the board for many years.

He was a founding board member of the National Indigenous Radio Service, and was the Asia Pacific representative of the World Association of Community Radio Broadcasting. He was a founding chairperson of the Community Media Training Organisation and National Indigenous Media Association.

== Awards and honours ==
Bayles was the inaugural winner of the Deadly Award for Indigenous Broadcaster of the Year, and in 2014 he received the inaugural Amnesty International media award.

He was named Queensland Father of the Year in 2005.

== Personal life and death ==
Bayles died of cancer on 17 April 2016, aged 62.

He had nine daughters. One daughter, Yarraka, is the mother of actor Quaden Bayles, who has dwarfism. Yarraka is also a facilitator at cultural organisation Black Card.
