= Imparja Television =

Australian television station

- Logo used since 2025
- Country: Australia
- Broadcast area: Remote Central and Eastern
- Network: Nine Network
- Headquarters: Alice Springs, Northern Territory

Programming
- Language: English
- Picture format: 1080i HDTV

Ownership
- Sister channels: 9Go! 9Gem

History
- Launched: 2 January 1988; 38 years ago

Links
- Website: imparja.com

Availability

Terrestrial
- Freeview Imparja owned (virtual): 9

Imparja Television (IMP) is an independent Australian television station servicing over 3,600,000 km^{2} (1,400,000 sq mi), across six states and territories: Northern Territory, South Australia, Queensland, New South Wales, Victoria, and Tasmania. It is based in Alice Springs, and is controlled by Aboriginal people.

Imparja is the anglicised form of the pronunciation of the Arrernte word Impatye, meaning footprints. The word was used to represent that Imparja Television aims to service Arrernte people wherever they may live, from Mutitjulu to King's Canyon to Alice Springs to Tennant Creek and beyond. They describe their range as a footprint.

Broadcasting began on 2 January 1988. In 2008, Imparja Television was identified on-air and in print as Nine Imparja, following its dropping of Network Ten affiliation. In 2009, the station again identified as simply "Imparja" and "IMP", although the Nine Network's nine dots seen in the logo remain. It broadcasts its programming from the Nine Network. As of 1 April 2025, VAST has upgraded Imparja's signal to HD.

== History ==
=== Origins ===
The then Australian Broadcasting Tribunal was asked by the Federal Minister for Communications in October 1984 to inquire into the allocation of commercial television licences for a number of remote areas. Licences were granted in 1985 to the Golden West Network, which broadcast to Western Australia, and QSTV in north-eastern Australia.

In 1986 hearings for the allocation of the licence began, and the Central Australian Aboriginal Media Association (CAAMA), which began providing Central Australian radio programs in local languages in 1980, formed Imparja Television Pty Ltd as a company. Soon after, the Government of the Northern Territory announced support to underpin the viability of the Central Zone Remote Television Service (RCTS) by offering to purchase an estimated $2 million package of services from the successful applicant. The Government of South Australia undertook a similar promise, offering loans of $1 million to Imparja if they were successful. An extraordinary saga of political, legal and commercial intrigue then ensued during the protracted Australian Broadcasting Tribunal (ABT) hearing process, pitching Federal, State and Territory Governments against one another with loan promises being substantially watered down or withdrawn as it became apparent the CAAMA application may prevail. Windfall funding from the Australian Bicentennial Authority and the Aboriginal Development Commission ultimately underpinned the feasibility of the CAAMA bid and they were successfully allocated the licence. However subsequent Federal Administrative Tribunal court proceedings brought about by the unsuccessful applicant, Darwin based Territory Television Ltd., attempting to overturn the ABT's decision delayed construction commencement of the new service until May 1987.

By October 1987 the new station had begun to build rebroadcast sites and new studios and a main transmitter based in Alice Springs were completed.

Imparja's first test program, Australia versus Sri Lanka Test Cricket, was telecast on 2 January 1988 in Alice Springs. Two weeks later, on 15 January 1988, the station was officially inaugurated at Imparja Television's head office in Alice Springs by Minister for Communications Ralph Willis and Warren Snowdon, the Australian federal member of parliament for the Division of Lingiari in Northern Territory.

The long-running Aboriginal culture and language documentary program series Nganampa Anwernekenhe (meaning "Ours" in the Pitjantjatjara and Arrernte languages) began production in 1987. It comprised hundreds of 30-minute episodes, on which David Tranter was sound recordist and also directed a couple. Nearly 31 hours of the series' films are held on videocassette by AIATSIS.

Imparja became the first Aboriginal member of the Federation of Australian Commercial Television Stations and the now-defunct Regional Television Association, both dominant organisations at the time. Imparja was chaired by Freda Glynn for its first ten years and, for a time, she was the only female chair of a television network in the world.

Imparja had an initial population reach of 62,000 people, which by 1993 had grown to 125,000. Imparja was available through retransmission sites at Ceduna, Coober Pedy, Leigh Creek and Woomera in South Australia, and Alice Springs, Tennant Creek, Katherine and Bathurst Island in the Northern Territory, as well as on the Optus Aurora satellite platform.

Imparja initially carried programming from all three major Australian commercial television networks, but following aggregation of market area with QSTV, it affiliated with the Nine Network and Network 10. Imparja also screened some ABC Television and SBS Television Indigenous programs, all in addition to original programs commissioned by the station.

=== 1990s ===
In 1990, Imparja Local News was launched as a fifteen-minute insert of local news into the national bulletin. The station also covered the Northern Territory general election live from its Alice Springs studios. This followed the lead taken in 1989 when the station began to produce weather reports for parts of the Northern Territory, South Australia and New South Wales, presented by Lavinia Hampton.

By 1993, Imparja's viewing audience had doubled to approximately 125,000 Australians. This in turn led to the increased allocation of government funding in 1994 to produce Yamba's Playtime, which was the station's first in-house televisual production. Yamba's Playtime featured the station's official mascot, "Yamba". Also in 1994, the Imparja board of directors established the Imparja Business Development Sub Committee, to monitor and provide strategic recommendations for areas of growth for the company.

In 1995, Imparja received the Telstra Indigenous Business Award for Business of the Year. Also in 1995, Imparja's satellite transmission moved from the Aussat A-Class satellites to the Optus B1 satellite, and the station's licence was renewed.

Two new in-house productions were launched in 1996. The first being the BRACS Program, which was almost fully produced by Aboriginal communities, and Corroboree Rock, an Aboriginal music program.

Imparja's parent company, Imparja Pty Ltd, converted to a proprietary company in 1997, and in the late 1990s, Imparja moved to digital satellite technology on the Optus Aurora platform. This meant that Imparja's satellite transmission moved from the Optus B1 satellite to the Optus C1 satellite.

1999 saw Imparja adopt a joint Nine and 10 network schedule, via the aggregation of Imparja’s coverage area with the Remote Eastern Australia market.

=== 2000s ===
By 2001 the station's coverage area had grown to include over 430,000 people. Around this time Imparja Info Channel (Channel 31) was launched, providing additional programming, news, and community information to remote Aboriginal communities. The Aboriginal programming on this channel later became known as Indigenous Community Television (ICTV). In 2007, the whole channel was replaced by National Indigenous Television (NITV).

Imparja faced criticism by a number of community groups in 2004, following the station's decision to introduce advertising for alcohol for the first time. The network pledged to donate 30% of the total income received from alcohol advertising towards alcohol and substance abuse programs in communities.

In 2005, Imparja National News, which primarily covered the news in Alice Springs in addition to other national and international news stories, was axed. The move was taken in anticipation of the Remote Eastern & Central Australia TV1 licence area being merged with that of Darwin. Regulations imposed by the Australian Communications and Media Authority relating to minimum levels of local news coverage led to 2006 reinstatement of Imparja National News. The news service began broadcasting again from the middle of February 2006, with Ryan Liddle as presenter.

In the mid-2000s, it was widely expected that the Australian Communications and Media Authority would merge the "Darwin" and "Remote Eastern and Central Australia" commercial television licence areas. This would have most likely seen Imparja Television become a Network 10 affiliate in Darwin. Instead, PBL Media and Southern Cross Broadcasting, the two existing Darwin commercial licence holders, were invited to bid individually or together. Their successful joint bid used a company called Darwin Digital Television.

On 3 February 2008, Imparja Television updated its logo, removing the emblem which had been present on the logo for two decades. The logo change coincided with Imparja dropping Network 10 affiliation, becoming a sole Nine Network affiliate, in addition to axing Imparja National News, and also adding Nine Network's dots to its new logo.

=== 2010s ===
On 19 May 2010, the ACMA (Australian Communications and Media Authority) approved a licence for a new remote area digital-only TV channel, a joint venture by Imparja Pty Ltd and Southern Cross Central. It was launched on 30 June 2010 as "10 Central (CDT)".

In December 2010, Imparja Television began broadcasting on terrestrial digital TV and the new VAST satellite service. This expansion included the establishment of two feeds for these platforms, Imparja North (Qld/NT) and Imparja South (NSW/SA/Vic/Tas). Programming on "north" and "south" feeds are identical, however permits correct transmission of non-live programs (for program classification purposes) during daylight saving time, which the states and territories on the "south" feed observe but the "north" states do not - effectively creating a 1-hour timeshift.

Imparja Pty Ltd also began to launch digital channels 9Go! and 9Gem. Imparja provides one feed for 9Gem, while 9Go! has separate "north" and "south" feeds. There are currently no plans at this stage for Imparja to launch an HD simulcast or introduce 9Life and 9Rush to its viewers.

== 2020s ==
On 16 November 2022, the station dropped its independent branding and switched to a dirty feed from the Nine Network.

In May 2023 the Albanese government committed extra funding to the station in its budget to prevent deep cuts to the services it provides.

== Programming ==
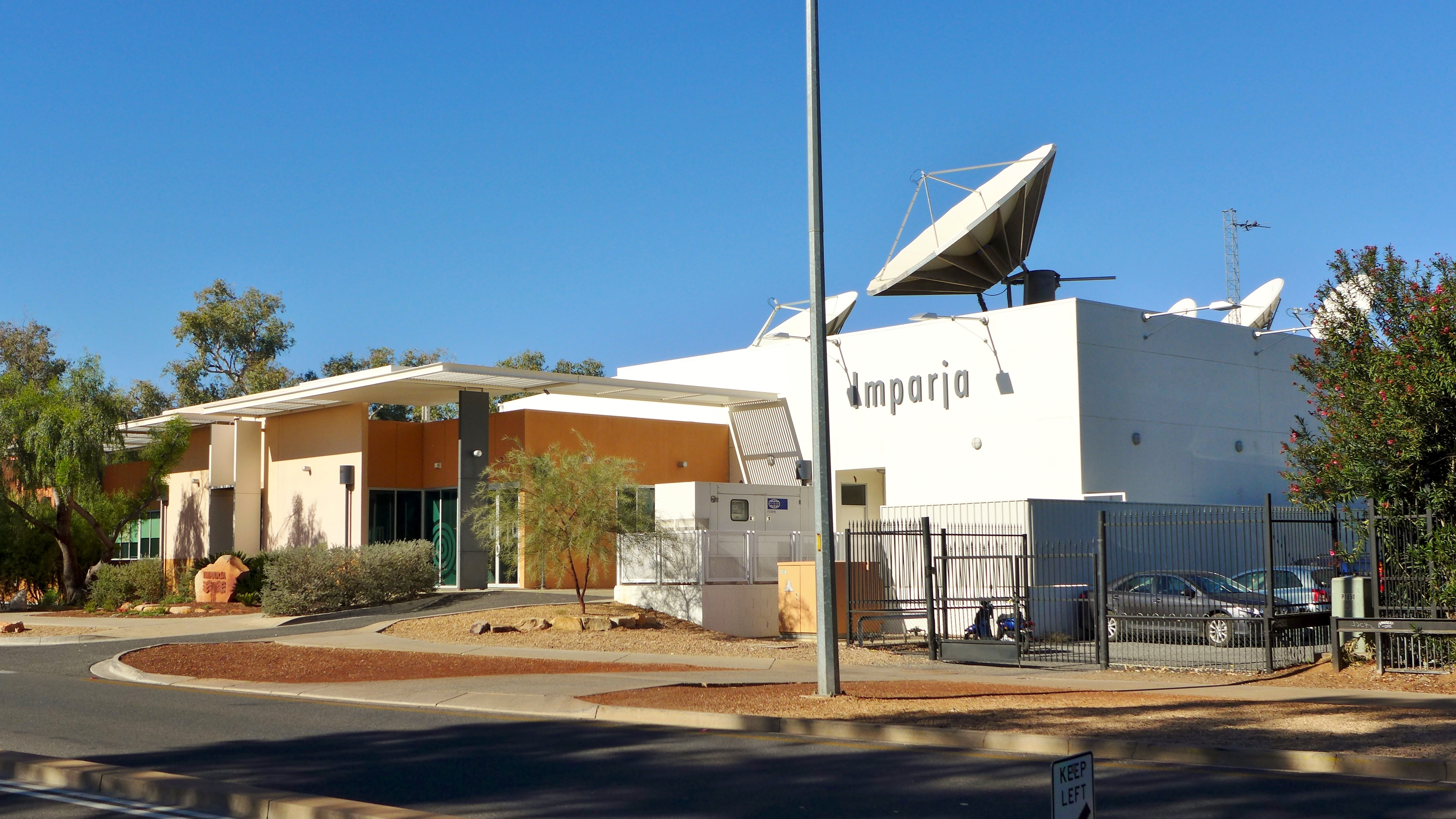
Imparja Television's headquarters in Alice Springs, 2015

Imparja Television is a sole Nine Network affiliate. The station previously broadcast both Nine and Ten programming, however it stopped broadcasting Network 10 programming on 3 February 2008. Imparja Television has also aired original programs produced by local Aboriginal community members, such as Bush Mechanics and the children's program Yamba's Playtime. Imparja also airs programming relating to local Australian rules and community sports, as well as news updates and religious thought for the day programs. Imparja Television also regularly broadcasts films created by the Central Australian Aboriginal Media Association, which is a shareholder of its parent company.

Imparja's programming schedule is currently based on the Nine Network schedule for Brisbane (based on Eastern Standard Time). Prior to February 2008, scheduling was generally based on Central Standard Time, reflecting its Alice Springs-based heritage. As a result, programs are now broadcast half an hour earlier in regional Northern Territory than they previously would have been under the previous arrangement.

=== News and current affairs ===
Imparja no longer airs its own news service, but instead airs Nine News.

==== History ====
Imparja introduced a local news service (primarily covering the Alice Springs area) into its nightly simulcast of National Nine News in 1990. Subsequently, the bulletin expanded into a full half-hour program incorporating local, national and international news, called Imparja National News The program was directed at Indigenous and non-Indigenous viewers, but found a wide audience among Australians interested in Indigenous Australian issues, as such topics are rarely covered in the mainstream Australian media.

In 2005, Imparja National News was cancelled in anticipation of the network's licence area being merged with that of Darwin. Regulations imposed by the Australian Communications and Media Authority relating to minimum levels of local news coverage led to the bulletin's revival in February 2006 with Ryan Liddle.

Two years later, the bulletin was cancelled again and replaced by short one-minute updates broadcast throughout the day. A short-lived weekly current affairs program, Footprints, was also introduced.

In 2008, Imparja replaced Imparja National News – a 30-minute, weeknight program combining local and national/international news – with local news updates, plus a 30-minute local news magazine program, Footprints (which later ceased production in 2009). The news updates were presented by Emma Groves from 2014 until July 2016.

In 2009 Imparja began airing the Darwin edition of Nine News live at 6:30 pm (AEST) on weekdays, immediately following the Brisbane edition, in place of A Current Affair – thereby restoring a Northern Territory-based bulletin to the station. Following the expansion of Nine News to one hour, which caused the two bulletins to overlap, the Darwin edition (as of 2024) instead airs live on Imparja's feed of 9Gem.

The news anchors included:

- 1990–1996: Livinia Hampton or Kerrynne Liddle
- 1996 – Mid-1998: Catherine Liddle
- Mid 1998 – July 2003: Mervyn Castillon or Catherine Liddle
- July 2003 – March 2004: Mervyn Castillon or Stephanie Smail
- March 2004 – May 2005: Mervyn Castillon, Ryan Liddle or Stephanie Smail
- May 2005 – June 2007: Ryan Liddle
- June 2007 – November 2012: Ryan Liddle or Catherine Liddle
- November 2012 – February 2014: Emma Groves or Peter Jolly
- February 2014 – July 2016: Emma Groves

==== Archives ====
The National Film and Sound Archive holds scripts of Imparja News bulletins dating from 1990–1999.

There are 17 videos of Imparja National News dating from 2012–2015 on YouTube.

=== Sport ===
Imparja airs most sports coverage from the Nine Network under the Wide World of Sports branding, including football, rugby league, cricket, netball, golf and tennis. The station previously broadcast some motorsport and Australian rules coverage until 2008.

== Availability ==
=== Terrestrial ===
Imparja broadcasts free-to-air digital television channels Imparja, 9Gem and 9Go! via terrestrial transmissions. As of 2021 it broadcasts from 28 transmission towers and over 20 remote towns, with the signal retransmitted by low-watt transmitters. The network is licensed to broadcast within the Remote Central and Eastern Australia TV2 and Mount Isa TV1 licence areas, which include Alice Springs, Bourke, Ceduna, Charleville, Cobar, Coober Pedy, Cooktown, Katherine, Lightning Ridge, Longreach, Mount Isa, Roma, St George, Walgett and Weipa, as well as some black spots just east of the Western Australian border.

=== Satellite ===
A digital satellite transmission of Imparja's channels is available free-to-view on the VAST service in all states and territories of Australia, except Western Australia. 9Gem is broadcast as a single channel to all viewers, while Imparja and 9Go! are each split into two separate channels. Imparja North and 9Go! North are broadcast in Australian Eastern Standard Time for viewers in Northern Territory and Queensland (Northern Australia TV3 licence area), and Imparja South and 9Go! South in Australian Eastern Summer Time for viewers in New South Wales, Victoria, South Australia, Tasmania and Norfolk Island (South Eastern Australia TV3 licence area).

Imparja North and Imparja South are broadcast in high definition.

Imparja Television was previously available in New Zealand until March 2008, when the New Zealand Government pressured the Australian Government to remove the service from the satellite footprint that includes New Zealand. It is also available in Port Moresby in Papua New Guinea through the Digicel Pacific subscription television service.

== Logos ==
Imparja Television's first logo was developed from a painting produced by an Arrernte artist and traditional owner. The logo symbolised the MacDonnell Ranges, the Todd River and the Yeperenye caterpillar. An updated version designed by Bruce Dunlop Associates debuted on 30 January 2006, adding a blue sphere behind the emblem. When Imparja re-affiliated with Nine Network in 2007, the long-time emblem was replaced by the Nine Network dots.

14 January 2008 – 17 February 2025

17 February 2025 – present
