= Westlink (Australian TV channel) =

TV channel in Western Australia, Australia

- Country: Australia
- Broadcast area: Remote and Regional Western Australia
- Headquarters: West Perth, Western Australia

Programming
- Language(s): English
- Picture format: anamorphic 576i (SDTV)

Ownership
- Owner: Government of Western Australia

History
- Launched: 1992; 33 years ago
- Closed: December 16, 2017; 7 years ago
- Former names: Westlink Network (1992–2013)

Westlink, formerly known as Westlink Network, was an Australian free-to-view digital television channel broadcast to regional and remote areas of Western Australia on the Viewer Access Satellite Television service. Funded by the Government of Western Australia, the channel was managed and operated by the Department of Regional Development and broadcast a range of community-based content, particularly training and educational programs, using an open-narrowcast licence. The channel was received in over 150 remote locations such as telecentres, schools and colleges.

The channel was quietly shut down on 16 December 2017 following the live broadcast of the West Australian Symphony Orchestra's "Symphony in the City" concert.

== Programming ==
The channel was primarily used for educational and talk-back style programs, including video conferences, corporate training videos, and health and educational focused training segments. Many of the programs were viewed in group situations, such as telecentres and TAFE colleges. Some bodies that used Westlink were;

- Department of Health
- Rural Health Education Foundation
- Telethon Institute
- Office of Shared Services
- Diocesan Pastoral Formation Centre

The now defunct community television channel Access 31 from Perth was once simulcast on weekends. This simulcast ended when Access 31 closed down on 6 August 2008.

On 13 November 2009, community broadcaster Indigenous Community Television entered into an agreement with Westlink to allow them access to the then-Optus Aurora channel on weekends. The agreement ceased on 18 April 2013, when ICTV officially launched their own dedicated channel on the VAST service.

== Availability ==
Westlink was formerly available on the Viewer Access Satellite Television service on virtual channel 602, and could be accessed by all viewers nationally. The channel was previously available on the Optus Aurora satellite service, but was migrated to VAST in April 2013. Analogue terrestrial transmissions were also broadcast in Albany and Bunbury.

Approximately 25% of all free-to-view satellite users in Western Australia watched Westlink. The Goldfields-Esperance region had the most viewers, with approximately 6.1% out of a total 11.8% satellite households report viewing the service.

== Identity ==
Westlink often played a loop of still scenic photographs and information slides in between scheduled programs throughout the day due to the large gaps between programming.

== See also ==
- Indigenous Community Television
- Community television in Australia
- Access 31
- Government of Western Australia
