= Keith Jackson (media executive) =

Australian broadcaster (born 1945)

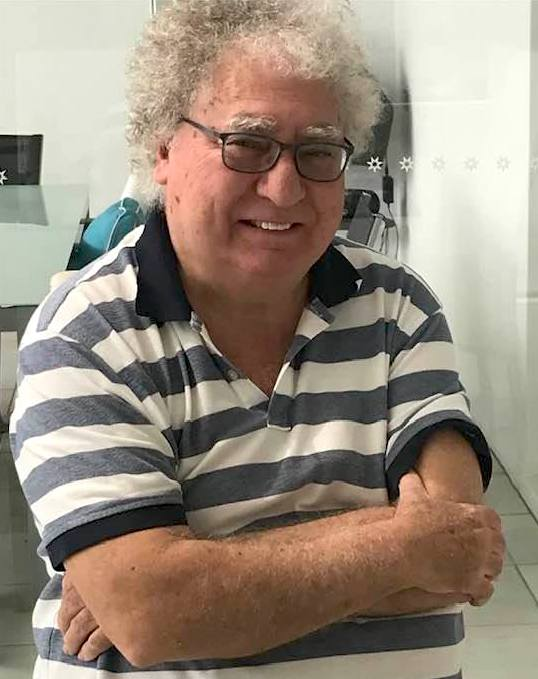
Keith Jackson at home in Noosa aged 75

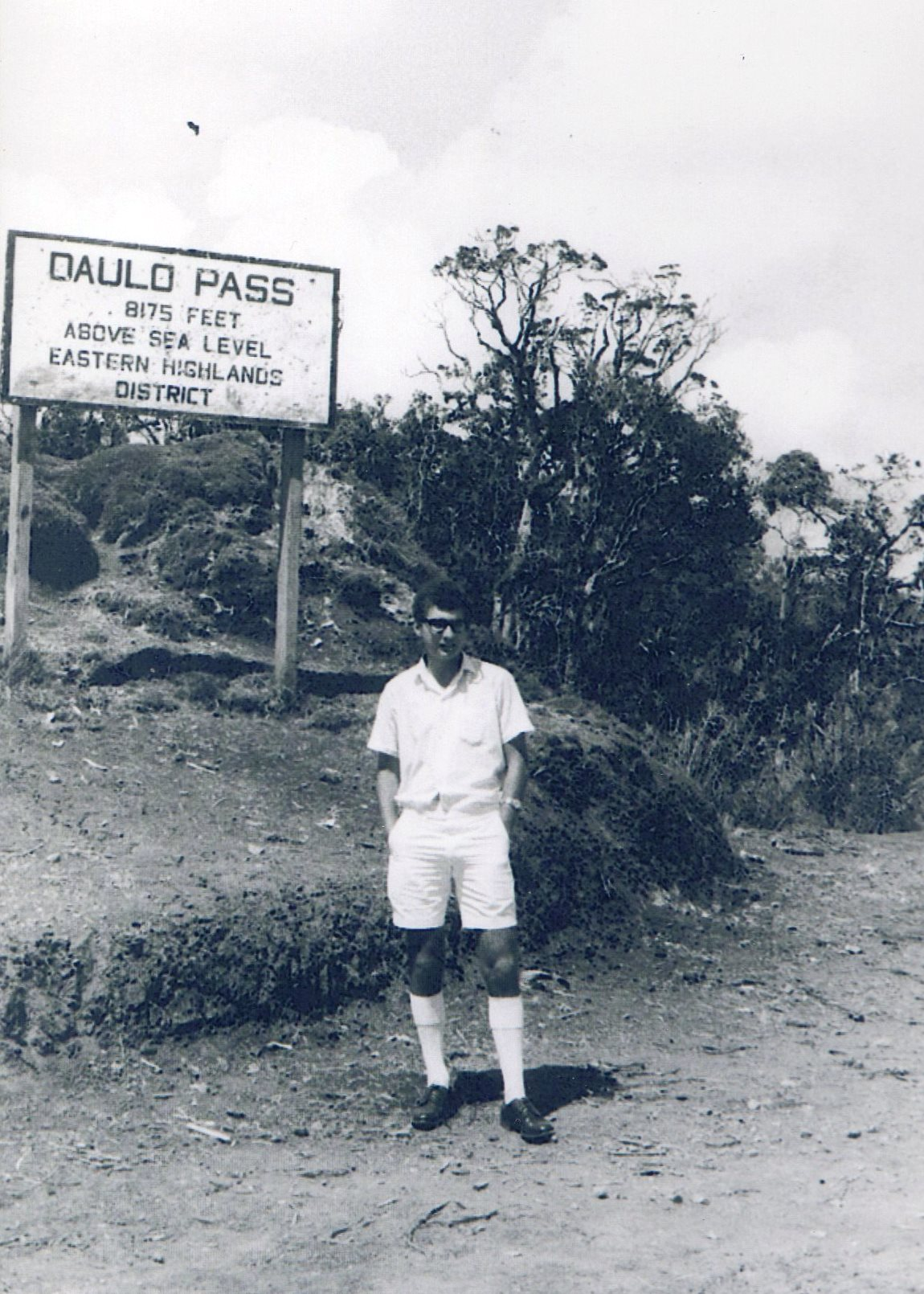
Keith at Daulo Pass January 1965

Keith Jackson, AM, FRSA, FAIM, (born 7 January 1945) is a British-born Australian journalist, blogger and retired media executive, known for his long relationship with Papua New Guinea, where he worked as a young man. He was foundation manager of two Australian radio stations (2ARM-FM Armidale and 2SER-FM Sydney), introduced educational broadcasting into the Maldives Republic, was the first head of corporate relations in the Australian Broadcasting Corporation and established a national public relations and issue management company.

== Early life and education ==
Jackson was born in Macclesfield, Cheshire, the eldest of two sons and a daughter born to Joan (née Simpson) (1920–1976) and Stanley Jackson OAM. (1913–2012), schoolteacher, author, environmentalist and marathon cyclist. Jackson’s paternal great-grandfather, Robert (Bob) Jackson, was a celebrated manager of the Besses o’ th’ Barn brass band, of Whitefield, Greater Manchester in the United Kingdom. Stanley Jackson migrated with his family from Liverpool, England, arriving in Sydney, Australia, in November 1949. The family moved to Nowra, New South Wales, where Jackson was educated in public schools.

From childhood, Jackson aspired to become a journalist, and at Nowra High School (1957–1961) was student editor of the school magazine, Shoalhaven, won the public speaking contest in three consecutive years and was a member of its debating team. He reported on junior basketball for the Nowra News and also represented the school at football (soccer) and basketball.

== Teaching ==
After passing the NSW Leaving Certificate in 1961, Jackson accepted a place at the Australian School of Pacific Administration (ASOPA), which trained teachers to serve in the then Australian Territory of Papua and New Guinea (Papua New Guinea). Completing the course in late 1963, he was posted to Papua New Guinea as an Education Officer.

While in Papua New Guinea, Jackson undertook short term teaching and administrative assignments in Wewak and Goroka and in early 1964 was transferred to the one-teacher Kundiawa A School in Chimbu Province. He taught students aged from six to eleven whose expatriate parents were entitled to have them educated by teachers trained to Australian requirements. In early 1966, he was appointed head teacher of the 160 student Gagl Primary T School in a tribal area 15 kilometers north of Kundiawa. After teaching for three years, during which he also wrote prolifically as a freelance journalist, he obtained his NSW Teachers’ Certificate. He later studied economics and political science part-time at the newly established University of Papua New Guinea, graduating in 1975 with a Bachelor of Arts. Further correspondence study in 2003-05 through the University of New England, NSW, earned him a Graduate Diploma in Management.

== Early journalism and broadcasting ==
=== Beginnings ===
At ASOPA (1962–63), Jackson and student teacher colleagues established the literary magazine Vortex and Jackson wrote many scripts and acted in the revue, The Natives Are Restless, staged at Mosman Town Hall in 1963. Within months of Jackson arriving in Papua New Guinea, he and teaching colleague Murray V. Bladwell (1941-2019) established the fortnightly Kundiawa News (1964–66), a stencil-based publication circulating 300 copies. The only complete set of 50 issues is held by the National Library of Australia.

During this period Jackson freelanced as a reporter for the Port Moresby branch of the Australian Broadcasting Commission (ABC) and was later contracted by the ABC to write educational radio scripts. These capabilities were noticed by the Department of Education which, in late 1966, transferred him to Port Moresby as editor of the School Paper and other publications. During this period he continued to freelance for the ABC as a writer, actor and producer and contributed to early issues of the controversial satirical magazine Black and White.

=== Australian Broadcasting Commission (ABC) ===
Late in 1967 Jackson was recruited by the ABC to its permanent staff of educational broadcast producers in Papua New Guinea, receiving further training at the ABC Training School at Kings Cross in Sydney. Through 1968 and 1969 he produced some 250 radio broadcasts on current affairs, social studies and English language, mainly for primary school students. He also reported on athletics for the Papua New Guinea Post-Courier, including covering the sport at the second South Pacific Games in Port Moresby in 1969.

=== Radio Rabaul ===
In 1970 Jackson successfully applied for a management role in the radio service operated by the Papua New Guinea Department of Information and Extension Services. His first assignment was to Rabaul in New Britain as assistant manager and news director of Radio Rabaul. It was a turbulent time in the region, where land alienation issues had triggered a protracted and sometimes violent uprising by the Mataungan Association, a proto-independence movement. As a government radio station, Radio Rabaul was perceived by much of the population as an instrument of colonial propaganda and became a target of hostility. In the performance of newsgathering and other duties, at times Jackson came under threat. He later wrote that the political ferment taught him much about communicating in situations of civil strife.

=== Radio Bougainville ===
In November 1970 Jackson was deployed to Kieta in Bougainville to manage Radio Bougainville. He said the only direction he received from Port Moresby headquarters before going to Bougainville was to “straighten out the station”. He took over from the first Papua New Guinean station manager, Samuel (Sam) Piniau (1940–2007), who was being groomed to become Chairman of the soon to be established National Broadcasting Commission. Jackson and Piniau formed a close friendship, sharing a perception of how radio broadcasting should develop in the soon to be independent country.

In Bougainville, a secession movement was active after the island had been profoundly disrupted by land acquisition for a huge copper and gold mine and the recruitment of non-local labour. The government-owned Radio Bougainville was seen by the Indigenous people as pro-mining and anti-secession and they responded aggressively to this positioning. Jackson moderated the station’s strident coverage to better align it with community expectations.

=== UNESCO Yogyakarta ===
In April 1973, Jackson accepted a six-month consultancy with UNESCO to bring into service an educational radio broadcasting project in central Java, Indonesia, and he and his family moved to Yogyakarta. Reviewing his work in October 1973 Jackson wrote that his appointment was intended to provide a ‘big push’ to the project, which was now operational, but many problems remained. Throughout this period, he continued to freelance for Australian publications including Pacific Islands Monthly, Nation and Nation Review.

=== National Broadcasting Commission (NBC) ===
Jackson declined an offer to remain with UNESCO and returned to Papua New Guinea in November 1973 on the eve of the creation of the National Broadcasting Commission, which amalgamated ABC and government services under the chairmanship of Sam Piniau. Jackson was appointed to the stop-gap role of Head of Research. Of this period, Ian Mackay wrote, “….as a result of their work the NBC will be better informed on what is required of broadcasting in a multilingual developing country.”

As 1974 unfolded, Piniau struggled to better align the NBC to meet the serious operational and financial challenges it faced as Papua New Guinea independence loomed. He assigned Jackson to direct a new policy and planning group, the Secretariat. Over the next two years, the unit completed the NBC’s first Five Year Plan, introduced radio advertising, secured aid from international organisations, established links with overseas broadcasting bodies, developed a strong audience research component and launched the magazine, Transmitter. The Secretariat also published papers covering issues such as broadcasting autonomy, an operating structure for broadcasting in Papua New Guinea, the relationship between the political system and broadcasting, commercial broadcasting and listener access to the airwaves.

Under its legislation, the National Broadcasting Commission was allowed to introduce advertising but planning for the commercialisation of one of the three radio networks led to a major political dispute. Initially Chief Minister Michael Somare approved the initiative but in April 1976, by now Prime Minister of an independent state, he wrote to Piniau warning the NBC to step back from advertising. “My prime concern centres on the possible deleterious effects which commercial broadcasting may have on the social and economic environment of our country”. Referring to Jackson and P.N. (Phil) Charley (1925–2014), who reported to Jackson on commercial broadcasting matters, Somare added, “I strongly suspect that the over-zealousness, arrogance and disregard of authority of the officers concerned had lead [sic] us into the present difficulties.” A dismayed Jackson resigned from the NBC in July 1976 and the government moved to prohibit advertising. But it was defeated in parliament and the NBC commercialised its English-speaking network.

=== 2ARM-FM ===
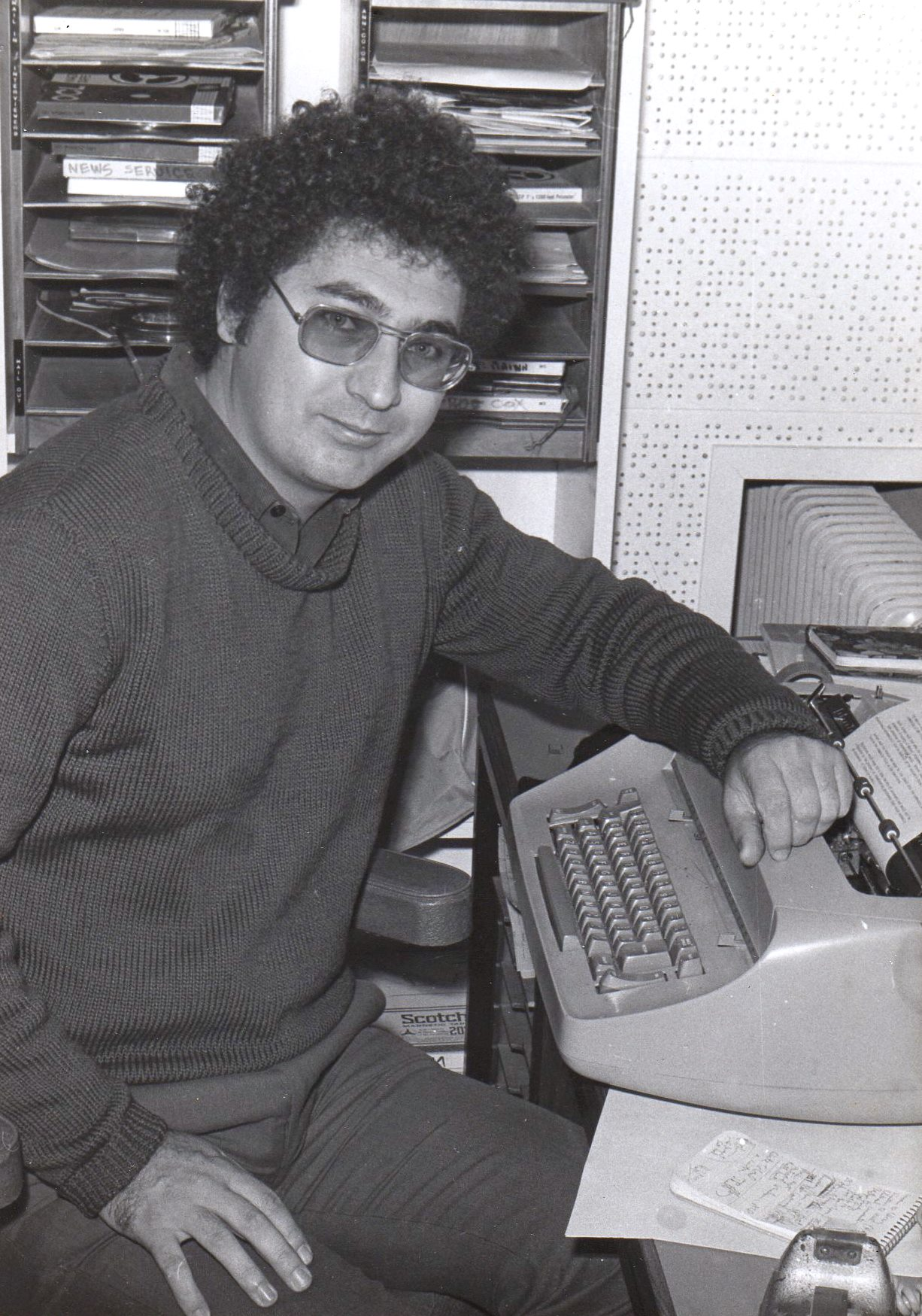
Keith Jackson, Station Manager at 2ARM-FM in 1976

Meanwhile Jackson secured a job as inaugural manager of 2ARM-FM, in Armidale, New South Wales, the first community-based radio station in regional Australia. Jackson, the station’s only full-time employee, with assistance from an energetic community, met a deadline to get it on air by October 1976.

2ARM-FM’s need for funds led Jackson to observe that the Wireless Telegraphy Act, under which the station was licensed, prohibited advertising but was silent on sponsorship. He subsequently devised a ‘corporate support plan’, first frowned upon by regulatory authorities but later recognised as an expedient means of facilitating the expansion of small, cash poor community stations across Australia by enabling them to broadcast sponsorship announcements with a limit of seven minutes an hour.

== Later journalism and broadcasting ==
=== UNESCO Maldives ===
In May 1977, Jackson accepted a second offer from UNESCO, this time to go to the Maldives as its educational broadcasting expert. During his two years in the Maldives he addressed technological constraints in the broadcasting system, developed a plan to drive the project forward, trained scriptwriters, producers and other personnel, and initiated radio programs for schools, adult education and teacher education. He travelled extensively in the country by boat to better understand radio reception issues while at the same time recording the island peoples’ stories and music.

In early 1978, Jackson went to New Delhi to manage the first joint India-Maldives training program in educational radio production under the auspices of the National Council of Educational Research and Training. Jackson also arranged for Maldivian broadcasters to undertake management training overseas. By early 1979, when Jackson’s contribution to the Maldives’ project ended, there had been significant investment in skills development, broadcasting technology and educational programs. Despite initial government concern, radio forums were established to enable people in the remote atolls to participate in national conversations on a range of issues. Eight years later the Maldives government invited Jackson back as a consultant to assess progress. In 2011, three decades after Jackson’s initial mission, Mohamed Shahyb, Vice President of the Maldives Broadcasting Commission, paid tribute to Jackson whose “expertise and advice were sought by the government of Maldives to launch a successful career of public service broadcasting in the country."

=== 2SER-FM ===
Despite UNESCO offering him another posting, Jackson decided to return to Australia with his family and in March 1979 was appointed to establish and manage 2SER-FM Sydney, an educational and community station for which the licence was held by the NSW Institute of Technology (now University of Technology, Sydney) and Macquarie University. The station commenced broadcasting on 1 October 1979, within a few months opening a second studio at Macquarie University. Jackson established an accompanying magazine, Listening Post, whose 138 issues (October 1979-February 1998) are now held by the National Library of Australia. Academic Liz Giuffre has written “the magazine soon gained a dedicated following of those who wanted to get a grassroots, but also truly independent, view of the Australian media landscape."

The six months it took to get the station and magazine operational was a period of intense activity as studios were constructed, programs developed, volunteer broadcasters trained, community and academic user groups identified, the station promoted and the magazine planned. On 1 October the deadline was met. “We all realised what a significant moment this was,” Jackson said. He now had three major challenges: 2SER-FM had to remain faithful to its educational licence while building an audience; it had to provide the community with access to the airwaves; and it had to generate sufficient funding to underpin its operations. Believing it would be inconsistent with the program format of the station, he eschewed the sponsorship which had worked well for 2ARM-FM in Armidale, instead employing a ‘user pays scheme’ where community groups that could afford to do so, paid for access; if they could not, it was provided without cost.

The station’s acceptance of the widest spectrum of views proved controversial, and balancing educational with access programming was challenging, but 2SER-FM flourished. Jackson “is affectionately known to his underlings as ‘the champion of pluralism’,” wrote John Handscombe in the Sydney Morning Herald. “The reference is to his formula of encouraging community access to, and participation in, public radio. It is affectionate because his formula is an intrinsic factor in the station's success, measured in a core audience of 65,000.”

=== International Training Institute (ITI) ===
In early 1983, after four years at 2SER-FM, Jackson took a lecturing position at the International Training Institute (ITI), the former ASOPA where he had studied to become a teacher 20 years earlier. At ITI he taught mass communication and related subjects to managers from developing countries in the Pacific Islands, the Caribbean, Asia and Africa. In 1984 he was appointed Deputy Principal and later the same year Acting Principal. While at ITI he produced a range of publications including its first Annual Report, promoted its training credentials and encouraged greater interaction with other institutions.

=== Australian Broadcasting Corporation (ABC) ===
During the early 1980s, the ABC was being extensively reformed and established a new Corporate Relations Department. In late 1984 Jackson was appointed to the post of Controller. In this role, he was responsible for the ABC’s relationships with government, media and community and also for internal communications. His activities during the three years he was with the ABC are extensively recorded in the second volume of Professor Ken Inglis’s history of the ABC.

Jackson worked assiduously to improve the ABC’s relationship with the Australian parliament. Managing director Geoffrey Whitehead remarked: “A turn-around in Canberra attitudes from about October 1985….was largely due to the efforts of the controller of corporate relations, Keith Jackson, in explaining our strategies and tactics.” And the biographer of ABC Chairman Ken Myer noted that, “Ken’s conduct improved when he was accompanied by the new controller of corporate relations, Keith Jackson, as coach and minder.” When Whitehead was dramatically replaced by David Hill as managing director in October 1986, historian Ken Inglis wrote that “Jackson [was] valued no less by Hill than by Whitehead as communicator with staff, board members and people in Canberra.”

Jackson also ran into turbulence. In his memoir, ABC staff-elected director and trade union official Tom Molomby reflected sourly on Jackson's activities. And UK-based Australian firebrand journalist John Pilger, in his book A Secret Country, accused Jackson of censoring him during a visit he made to Sydney, a claim Jackson denied, saying, “The only thing he got right was my name”. In his history of the ABC, Inglis revealed that Jackson had played a key and ‘astonishing’ role in the removal of Whitehead as Managing Director, referring to Jackson as “Cassius, the initiator”.

=== 8 cents a day campaign ===
In December 1987, ABC Managing Director David Hill faced a swingeing cut to the ABC's budget by the federal government and decided to mount a public campaign to resist the cut and obtain more reliable funding for the corporation.

It was a risky move for a government instrumentality to attack its paymaster but Hill, described as “a pugnacious and quasi-political operator” who “never hesitated to take it right up to his mates in the Labor government” was determined to proceed. The ABC Board agreed and Jackson was given the job of managing the operation, which he called ‘8 Cents a Day’ (based on how much the ABC cost every Australian). “The ABC’s ability to persuade the government that it deserved a better deal would be up to its millions of listeners,” he later wrote. “If we initiated a funding fight to which the community response was ‘ho-hum’, our goose would be well and truly plucked and roasted to a bitter crisp. But if community reaction was widespread, immediate and forcefully supportive, the ABC would prevail.”

The campaign, launched in early February 1988, gained huge support from around Australia. In Whose ABC?, Inglis recorded that “those words [Eight Cents a Day], thought up by Keith Jackson … became a rallying cry for nationwide agitation”. By mid-year the government had formally agreed to the ABC’s demands to stabilise its budget and be provided with triennial funding. For Jackson, though, the campaign was a final flourish of a broadcasting career of more than 20 years as in August he was head-hunted by the public relations arm of Mojo, at the time Australia’s largest advertising agency.

Over subsequent years Jackson retained links with broadcasting and was called upon to lead short-term media management training assignments for UNESCO in Indonesia, Philippines and Fiji, which led to the publication of his and P.N. Charley’s book, Manage By the Moment. In a voluntary capacity, he also assisted the people of Bougainville establish their first radio station, New Dawn FM, after the 1989-2000 Bougainville civil war.

== Public relations ==
=== Issues Australia ===
In August 1988, Jackson left the ABC for public relations firm Mojo Corporate (later Issues Australia) where he became Principal Consultant. Over the next two years he worked on projects for major clients BHP Steel, New South Wales State Rail, Westpac Bank, British Telecom, the New South Wales Premier's Department, and Queensland Rail.

=== Jackson Wells Morris ===
In February 1991, Jackson established his own company, Jackson Communications (later Jackson Wells Morris).He subsequently partnered with former Liberal Party political adviser John Wells and in 2000 with Graeme Morris, who had been chief of staff to Prime Minister John Howard. With a broad political balance, the company operated as a public relations and issues management firm.

Since his time in the ABC, Jackson had been studying how organisations might better deal with difficult corporate issues that if managed inexpertly could grow into full-blown crises. The issues management model he developed was used as the basis of JWM’s consulting and also translated into a successful training product for corporate executives. Recognising his prowess, in the mid-1990s Jackson was appointed as the first Australian executive member of the Washington DC–based Issue Management Council in the United States.

JWM grew steadily and opened branch offices in the major Australian cities of Canberra, Brisbane and Melbourne and appointed associates in Perth, Adelaide and Hobart. It also established overseas affiliates in London, New York, Djakarta and Hong Kong. Employees were sent to further their international experience by being sent on company scholarships to these cities. In the mid-1990s the company was appointed as the Australian member of the international public relations group, Pinnacle Worldwide, which gave it further reach into North America, Europe and Asia. By 2003 JWM was reporting revenues of $5 million, up 27 percent from the year before. At its peak in 2005 it was a $6 million company employing 23 people and providing services for 80 clients.

=== Ethics ===
Believing ethical issues were eroding the reputation of Australian public relations, Jackson took a vigorous public stand arguing that the industry body, the Public Relations Institute of Australia, needed “a stronger code of ethics [and] independent assessment of compliance”. Failing to achieve change, Jackson resigned his firm’s membership and developed JWM’s own code including the unusual directive that “where social and client interests conflict, and if the conflict is ethically relevant, JWM will seek to change the client’s position.”

The company’s publication, The Well, published 39 issues between 1992 and 2011 covering public relations practice, political analysis, client news and company projects. The only complete set in existence was assembled in April 2022 for deposition with the National Library of Australia.

== Political activity ==
Jackson first joined the Australian Labor Party in 1971 while still in Papua New Guinea, being sponsored by then Queensland state secretary T.J. (Tom) Burns (1931–2007). Jackson did not become an active member until 1979, when he returned to Australia from the Maldives and joined the Narrabeen-Pittwater Branch in Sydney. From 1980 to 1982 he was a State Conference delegate, from 1982 to 1983 Mackellar Federal Electorate Council president and later a member of the NSW ALP foreign relations platform committee. In 1982 he was pre-selected to stand for the safe Liberal seat of Mackellar. In the subsequent federal election of March 1983 he secured a swing to Labor of 4.8 percent but lost to incumbent, then Health Minister Jim Carlton. In 2014, Jackson resigned from the Labor Party stating that its policies on the Iraq-Syria war and asylum seekers were immoral.

While in retirement in Noosa, Jackson was strategy and communications adviser for the successful election campaigns of his wife Ingrid Jackson to Noosa Shire Council (2016), Sandra (Sandy) Bolton MP to the Queensland State legislature (2017) and Councillor Karen Finzel to Noosa Shire Council (2020).

== PNG Attitude ==
Jackson launched the blog PNG Attitude (originally ASOPA People) in February 2006 to enable Australians and Papua New Guineans to engage in public discussion on political, social, economic and literary matters. The blog is archived by the National Library of Australia. Jackson established the blog because “we’re like a family that’s drifted apart; we need to do something about that on both sides.” Dubbed ground-breaking and influential, PNG Attitude spun off the Crocodile Prize literary awards, triggering a revival in Papua New Guinean literature described by prominent Australian author Drusilla Modjeska as “a new generation of writers flushed out, encouraged and made visible”.

The blog also led to the establishment of a number of not-for-profit enterprises Pukpuk Publications (which published over fifty titles of mainly Papua New Guinean writing), the McKinnon-Paga Hill Fellowships, enabling Papua New Guinean writers to visit Australia, and the My Walk to Equality project, publisher of a notable collection of writing by Papua New Guinean women. PNG Attitude continues as an important information source on PNG affairs. Its story and that of the Crocodile Prize is documented in Philip Fitzpatrick’s book, Fighting for a Voice.

== Personal life ==
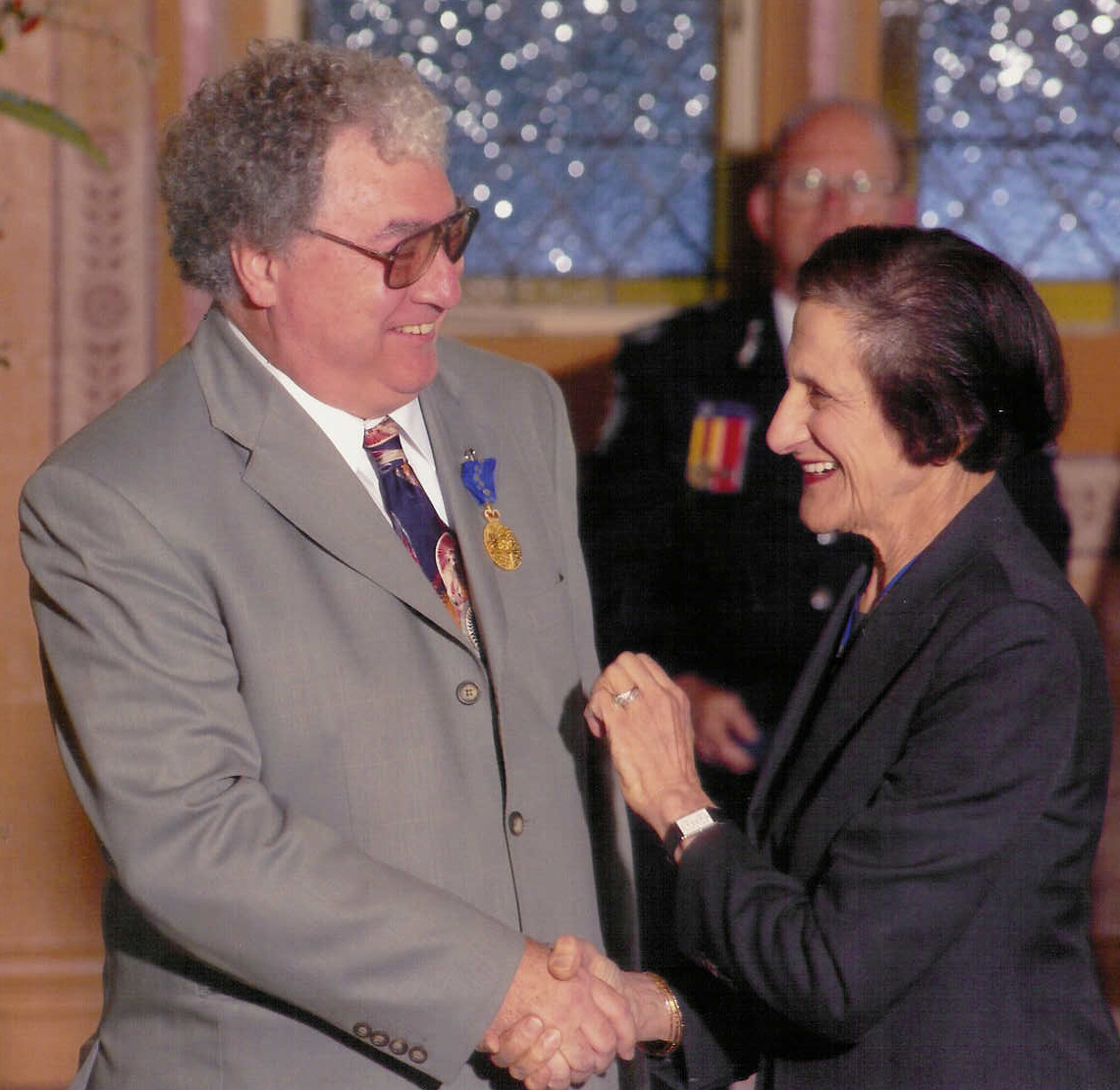
Keith Jackson inducted as AM

=== Awards and honours ===
Jackson received the Papua New Guinea Independence Medal in 1976 "for outstanding service" and in 2004 was appointed a Member of the Order of Australia (AM) "for services to management and training in media, communications, non-commercial broadcasting and public relations".

In 2010 he accepted an invitation to become an adjunct professor in the School of Journalism and Communication at the University of Queensland, retiring in 2014. He was a Fellow of the Royal Society of Arts (1995-2020), a Fellow of the Australian Institute of Management and Leadership (since 1983) and a Member of the Media, Entertainment and Arts Alliance (formerly Australian Journalists Association) (since 1972).

=== Marriage and children ===
Jackson married Susan Mary Flatt (b 1947) in April 1967 (divorced January 1985). There are two children, Simon (b 1967), information technologist and composer, and Sally (b 1970), an executive with the Australian Broadcasting Corporation. Jackson married academic and management consultant Ingrid Henriette Hallein (née Lowig) (b 1952) in May 1985. They have two sons. Jackson now lives in retirement with his wife in the Queensland resort town of Noosa.

=== ME/CFS ===
In the early years of the new century, Jackson had become increasingly ill and was diagnosed with myalgic encephalomyelitis/chronic fatigue syndrome (ME/CFS). Jackson relinquished his management of the company to Wells and was never again able to resume an active role. The company languished and, in 2012 when Wells established his own consultancy taking important clients with him, Jackson liquidated the ailing firm. In its 20 years of operation Jackson Wells Morris had consulted to more than 500 clients including major global and Australian companies and between 1995 and 2005 had been an industry pace setter.
