= Community Radio Network (Australia) =

The Community Radio Network (CRN) in Australia is a satellite program feed available to subscribing community radio stations. It was created and is managed by the Community Broadcasting Association of Australia (CBAA). The CRN does not produce the programs that are broadcast on the feed, but acts as a distributor of material supplied by member stations.

== History ==
After more than a decade of exchanging programs between stations on tape via mail, the CBAA established the Community Radio Satellite, known as ComRadSat in 1993. Four media organisations have co-operated to make the satellite service available to community radio stations all over Australia. These are the CBAA, the Australian Indigenous Communications Association, Radio Print Handicapped Network and the BBC World Service. Each organisation transmits their programs via Optus onto the C1 Satellite via the uplink site at Belrose.

In December 2013, CRN, RPH, NIRS and BBC World Service shifted to VAST satellite platform.

== Channels ==
The satellite feed is four distinct channels:

- Channel 601 – National Indigenous Radio Service provided by the AICA (stereo)
- Channel 632 – Radio for the Print Handicapped Australia (Vision Australia Radio Melbourne) provided by RPH Australia (mono)
- Channel 629 – BBC World Service (mono)
- Channel 630 – Community Radio Network provided by the CBAA (stereo)

=== Channel 630 ===
The Community Radio Network channel has a number of elements to the program feed.

- Core Programs – 30 or 60 minute programs produced by member stations. These are usually talk, music based or issue driven. One of the most popular programs is Allegro Non Troppo.
- Sustaining Service – CRN is broadcast 24 hours a day so subscriber stations can use the feed at any time, even to fill air time during an emergency or breakdown. CRN plays music when scheduled programs are not broadcast.
- News and Current Affairs – National Radio News is available on a separately charged basis. The hourly bulletins are produced by journalists and students at Charles Sturt University.
- Festivals – Live coverage of a range of music festivals each year including the Woodford Folk Festival, Tamworth Country Music Festival, WOMADelaide and the Wangaratta Festival of Jazz.
- Paid Programming – Appropriate organisations may buy airtime for special event programs or series.

== Funding ==
The CBAA maintains the satellite service through a combination of station subscription fees, an operating grant from the Community Broadcasting Foundation and fundraising such as paid program time. The radio stations can apply for a specific grant from the Community Broadcasting Foundation to purchase and install the satellite receiving equipment.

== Digital Delivery Network ==
Another aspect to the CRN is the DDN. The Digital Delivery Network works alongside the CRN satellite feed through online applications. A radio station can select its preferred programs on the DDN website and the stations’ DDN-enabled computer will automatically record the selected programs. Three months worth of current music content in a variety of genres is also made available for stations to use.

== See also ==
- Community Broadcasting Foundation
- National Ethnic and Multicultural Broadcasters Council
- Radio Print Handicapped Network
- Australian Indigenous Communications Association
