= Indigenous Community Television =

Australian television channel

- Country: Australia
- Broadcast area: Remote Central and Eastern Australia, Regional and Remote Western Australia
- Headquarters: Alice Springs, Northern Territory

Programming
- Languages: English; Australian Aboriginal English; Australian Aboriginal languages
- Picture format: anamorphic 576i (SDTV)

Ownership
- Owner: ICTV Limited (membership-based public company)

History
- Launched: 2001; 25 years ago (original channel); 13 November 2009; 16 years ago (revival)
- Closed: 13 July 2007; 19 years ago (original channel)
- Replaced by: NITV

Links
- Website: ictv.com.au

Availability

Terrestrial
- Freeview (virtual): 41 (Alice Springs, Broome)

Indigenous Community Television (ICTV) is an Australian free-to-view digital television channel on the Viewer Access Satellite Television service. It broadcasts television programs produced by, and for, Indigenous Australians in remote communities. The channel is owned by membership-based company Indigenous Community Television Limited. Although ICTV is a community television channel by name and content, it broadcasts using an open-narrowcast licence instead of a standard community television licence.

== History ==
In 2001, ICTV Limited was formed and began broadcasting a part-time segment on Imparja Info Channel, an open-narrowcast community-style channel already broadcasting occasional indigenous content from Pitjantjatjara Yankunytjatjara Media (PY Media) and Warlpiri Media Association (PAW Media). The channel operated from Imparja's broadcast facility in Alice Springs, Northern Territory, and was available on the Optus Aurora satellite service and via Imparja's analogue terrestrial transmitter network. The segment from ICTV was named 'IRCA in Action' and showcased predominantly local indigenous programs from a range of remote indigenous media organisations, including PAKAM, Ngaanyatjarra Media (NG Media) and organisations such as Bushvision.

By 2006, the programming from ICTV grew to encompass the channel 24 hours a day and the satellite channel was renamed to ICTV. Many remote indigenous communities in central and north eastern Australia had analogue terrestrial repeaters for this channel, which utilised community licences and later open-narrowcasting licences. In October 2006, ICTV was formally incorporated as a public company.

=== ICTV ceases transmission ===
On 12 July 2007, the Department of Communications, Information Technology and the Arts had implemented changes to the Indigenous Broadcasting Program in support of a new national indigenous TV channel. It was decided that the existing open-narrowcast licence from Imparja would be used to initially carry the channel, which resulted in ICTV ceasing transmission. For 2 years, ICTV Limited had no means of broadcasting content unless it was commissioned by National Indigenous Television, which was at odds with the company. The NITV commissioning model allegedly left out remote community producers due to the nature of how funding was allocated and other mandatory requirements.

ICTV Limited launched an online video service, IndigiTube, in April 2009.

=== The revival of ICTV ===
After a successful appeal to the Government of Western Australia, ICTV resumed broadcasting part-time on Westlink Network on 13 November 2009. Westlink Network was already carried on the existing Optus Aurora service as an open-narrowcast channel. Programming from ICTV was scheduled every weekend from Friday night to Monday morning. Remote communities with analogue terrestrial repeaters had begun to install equipment to automatically switch the NITV channel to Westlink Network every weekend.

On 28 May 2012, the Department of Broadband, Communications and the Digital Economy awarded ICTV with an open-narrowcast licence to broadcast on the Viewer Access Satellite Television service. The channel commenced trial transmissions on 6 December 2012. On 18 April 2013, ICTV officially relaunched and began broadcasting 24 hours a day on virtual channel number 601 in standard definition 576i format. A launch party was held at the PAW Media grounds in Yuendumu, Northern Territory to mark the occasion.

ICTV commenced broadcasting in Alice Springs on 5 April 2017, after being awarded a digital terrestrial free-to-air licence. The channel resides on virtual channel number 41.

== Programming ==
ICTV broadcasts a diverse range of indigenous programming, usually in the language of its contributors. Regular contributions are made by Aboriginal Resource and Development Services (ARDS), Pilbara and Kimberley Aboriginal Media (PAKAM), Pitjantjatjara Yankunytjatjara Media (PY Media), Warlpiri Media Association (PAW Media), Ngaanyatjarra Media (NG Media) and Broome Aboriginal Media Association (BAMA).

== See also ==
- List of digital television channels in Australia
- National Indigenous Television (NITV)
- Community television in Australia
- Westlink
