= Radio Skid Row =

- Australia
- Broadcast area: Inner West Sydney
- Frequency: 88.9 MHz FM

Programming
- Format: Community radio

Ownership
- Owner: Radio Skid Row Ltd

History
- First air date: 10 August 1983

Technical information
- Transmitter coordinates: 33°52′23″S 151°12′20″E

Links
- Website: radioskidrow.org

Radio Skid Row (callsign 2RSR; 88.9 FM) is a community radio station based in Marrickville, broadcasting to the Inner West suburbs of Sydney, Australia.

== History ==
Radio Skid Row (2RSR) was established by a group of welfare workers and licensed as a community broadcaster in September 1983, with the intention of broadcasting to marginalised groups such as Indigenous Australians, environmentalists, queer people, the Communist Party of Australia, and migrant workers. It was originally broadcast from the University of Sydney, and gave 10 hours of air time per week to Radio Redfern.

The station was described as "serv[ing] as an incubator for many artists who would go on to do interesting things". John Garland, who ran the prisoners' request show, moved to 2MBS Fine Music Sydney in 1991, where he presented experimental music. The program Wake Up and Listen also moved to 2MBS, with Gail Priest and Adrian Bertram. Lucas Abela (aka Justice Yeldham) started his career at Skid Row, on the "graveyard shift".

Colin Hesse hosted the Thursday morning show Close to Home for over ten years before retiring in May 2024. He was also active in local politics, as a representative of the Australian Greens on both the former Marrickville Council and the Inner West Council. He was known for his long-form interviews and bringing out deeper perspectives on issues.

On 29 September 2025 the Australian Communications and Media Authority (ACMA) published its findings that the radio station breached the Broadcasting Services Act in the course of dismissing a former volunteer radio host in December 2024, who was not provided adequate reasons for her dismissal or informed of her right to appeal. The ACMA report did not find that the volunteer's dismissal was itself in error. A second and separate investigation conducted at the same time into complaints about Radio Skid Row's on-air content did not find breaches of the community broadcasting codes of practice.

== Today ==
Skid Row Radio is situated in Addison Road, Marrickville, and broadcasts to the Inner West suburbs of Sydney.

Apart from broadcasting, like many community radio stations it provides equipment, time in a recording studio, training and mentoring to a diverse group of broadcasters, including Pacific Islanders and African Australians.

== See also ==
- List of radio stations in Australia
