= National Indigenous Radio Service =

Satellite program feed for Australian community radio

The National Indigenous Radio Service (NIRS) is a satellite program feed available in Australia to Indigenous and non-Indigenous community radio stations. NIRS provides targeted and specialist programming for and by Australia's Aboriginal and Torres Strait Islander broadcasters. From its base in Brisbane NIRS provides a feed of programs and music supplied by a number of contributing stations including Koori Radio, 4AAA and BBM.

Subscribing stations are able to re-transmit individual programs or entire blocks of program time as needed. As NIRS is broadcast 24 hours a day, stations with limited resources who are unable to provide a full-time service can use NIRS to fill the gaps between local programming. For those radio stations that already broadcast 24 hours a day, NIRS gives them access to national coverage of Indigenous current affairs and Indigenous news, which some stations may not have the resources to provide themselves.

== Funding ==
The National Indigenous Radio Service receives the bulk of its funds from the Australian Government through the National Indigenous Australians Agency.The service can also broadcast limited advertising in the form of sponsorship.

== Programming ==
Along with its bed of purely Australian and Indigenous music is national programming covering topics such as health, education, Government department updates and issues relevant to Indigenous Australians. Other programming includes regional news, sporting events and coverage of live music and festivals.

=== Australian rules football ===
During the home and away season, NIRS broadcasts descriptions of at least three Australian Football League matches every weekend. Expert commentators in 2011 included Gilbert McAdam, Ronnie Burns, Chris Johnson, Indigenous Team of the Century umpire Glenn James, and Darryl White.

=== VAST ===
National Indigenous Radio Service is distributed through VAST and livestreaming.

== National Indigenous News Service ==
The National Indigenous Radio Service is based in Brisbane and provides a national news service consisting of 15 five-minute bulletins Monday to Friday. The news service focuses on Indigenous news and stories relevant to Aboriginal and Torres Strait Islander people. The newsroom is mainly staffed by Indigenous journalists.

== See also ==
- Australian Indigenous Communications Association
- Central Australian Aboriginal Media Association
- Community Radio Network (Australia)
