= 2SER =

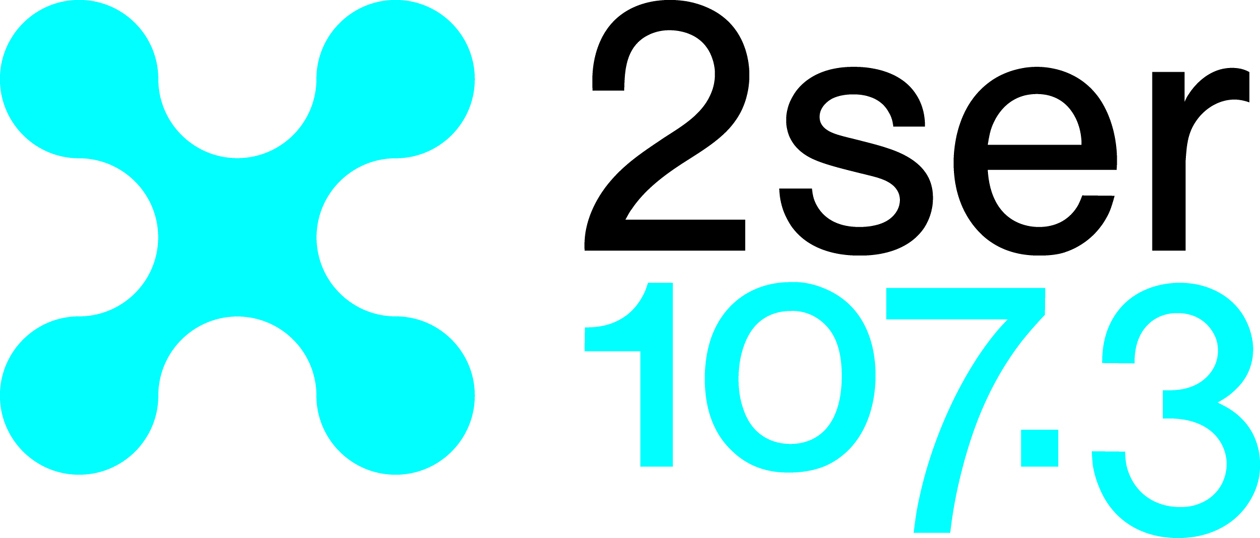

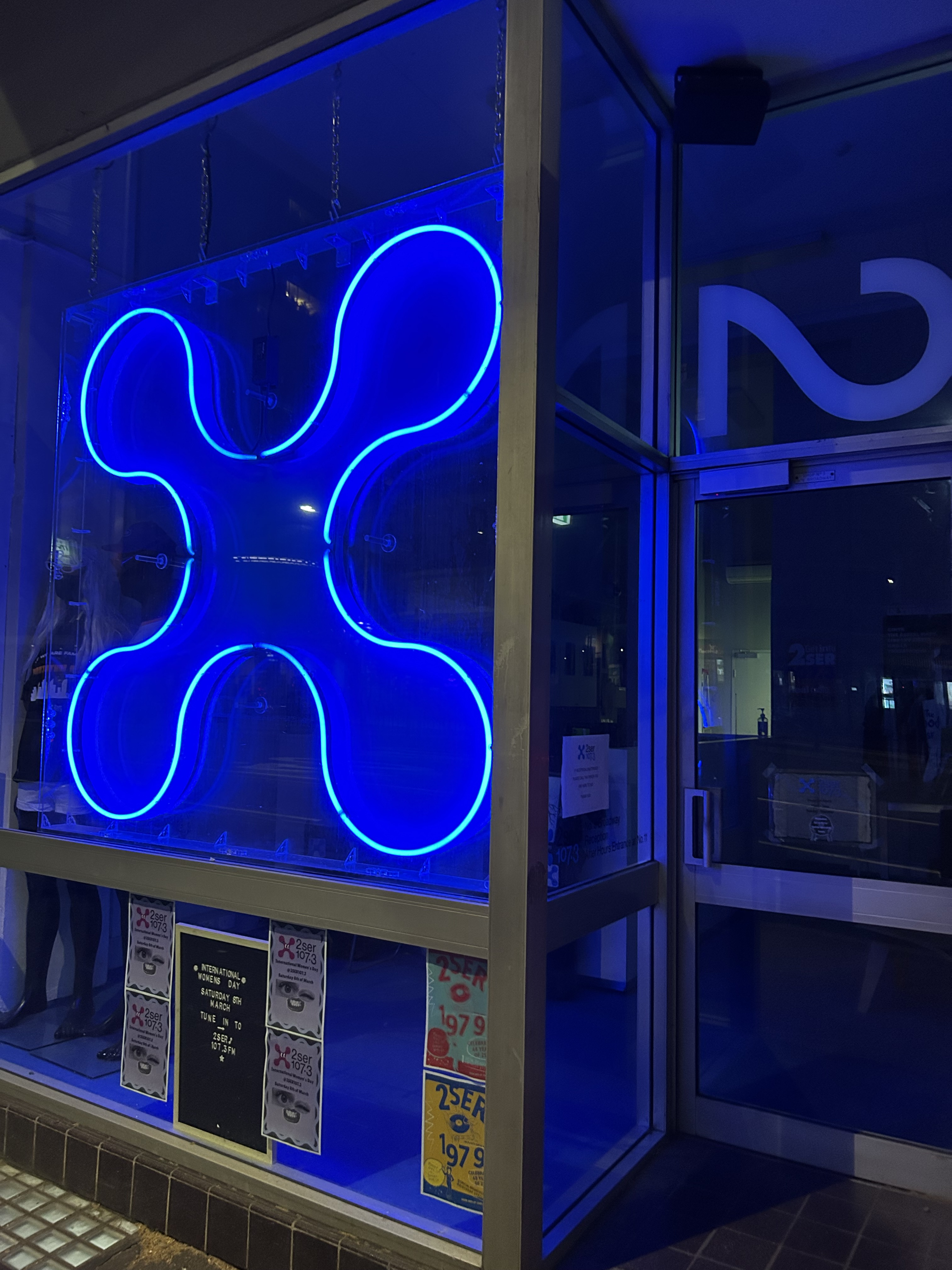
- Australia
- Broadcast area: Sydney
- Frequency: 107.3 MHz FM

Programming
- Format: Community radio
- Network: Community Broadcasting Association of Australia; Community Radio Network (Australia)
- Affiliations: University of Technology Sydney

Ownership
- Owner: Sydney Educational Broadcasting Limited

History
- First air date: 1 October 1979
- Former frequencies: 107.5 MHz FM

Technical information
- Licensing authority: Australian Communications and Media Authority
- Transmitter coordinates: 33°53′03″S 151°12′06″E

Links
- Public licence information: Profile
- Website: https://2ser.com

2SER (also known as Sydney Educational Radio) is a not-for-profit radio station in Sydney, New South Wales, Australia, broadcasting on the frequency 107.3 FM. It is operated by Sydney Educational Broadcasting Ltd, and funded by the University of Technology Sydney. It is a member of the Community Broadcasting Association of Australia. The station has a metro-wide license and broadcasts a mix of programming styles — specialist music, general magazines, specialist talks and podcasts.

== Programming ==
2SER broadcasts a wide range of music and talk shows. Talk show topics include science, current affairs, health, conservation, publishing, gender and queer culture, music, arts and theatre. Music genres include experimental, country, metal, pop and spatial audio. In 2024 station won a Community Broadcasting Association Australia Award for Excellents in Australian Music, sponsored by APRA AMCOS.

Some programs have been on air for more than 40 years, including Back To Funk, Static and The Phantom Dancer. Gaywaves, Sydney's first LGBTQIA+ program, aired from November 1979 to 2005. Gaywaves returned to air in 2022 after 17 years.

The station is also one of few media outlets that has a special program for prisoners, Jailbreak.

== History ==
On 1 October 1979, 2SER was opened by the Federal Minister for Education, Senator John Carrick.

In the mid-1990s the station expanded its programming to emphasise underground dance music. This caused friction within the station but 2SER organised a series of highly lucrative fund raising events called Freaky Loops in association with Sydney promoters such as Cryogenesis, Clan Analogue, Club Kooky and Elefant Traks which sustained the move to a new musical format for several years until 2001.

The station worked on improving its brand across the 2003–2005 period, incorporating a new logo, while the station's online presence and content experience was also redesigned.

In late 2004, the station was faced with a projected budget shortfall of up to $100,000 that financial year. Management addressed the situation by reducing the number of paid staff, putting forward proposals to scale down the use of its studio at Macquarie University and attempting to cater for a slightly older audience. These ideas were met with frustration from some volunteers. Internal activism resulted in a softening of policy and in early 2005, the new program grid was launched. Despite the controversy in its lead-up, it proved to be a simple reshuffle of the existing grid rather than a dramatic overhaul.

From the late 2000s and into the 2010s, 2SER has continued to expand its offerings across broadcast and digital, as well as with podcasting. It has won international awards for its collaborations, including a Silver Radio Prize at the New York Festivals Radio Awards for History Lab (with Impact Studios).

The station celebrated its 40th anniversary in October 2019 with a podcast series, exhibition and book, An Incomplete History of Community Radio: 2SER's 46 Boxes of Stuff. The station's long-term publication, Listening Post, was also digitised in full and placed in the Australian open access archive Trove. The station also runs live events.

Until June 2026, it was funded by the University of Technology Sydney (UTS) and Macquarie University.

In October 2025, Macquarie University ceased funding the station after 45 years. In April 2026, the station emailed volunteers that it could close by July of that year, due to financial difficulties after Macquarie University withdrew funding. An agreement was struck by the operators of 2SER and UTS to operate the station under a reduced capacity model, UTS also became the sole funders of the station.

== People ==
The station helped launch the broadcasting careers of Julie McCrossin, Robbie Buck, Richard Kingsmill, Helen Razer, Eleanor Hall, Fenella Kernebone, Steve Ahern, Jess Scully, Barbara Morison, Tanya Plibersek, Tracee Hutchison, Tiga Bayles, Stuart Coupe, Lorna Clarkson and Jonathan Harley — all of whom started out on the station as volunteers.

The founding station manager was Keith Jackson. Former station managers include Philip Shine, Kaye Blackman, Melanie Withnall, and Paula Kruger. The current station manager is Tony Duke supported by Michael Jones as operations coordinator, Lachlan Holland as music director, Jonathan Chang as volunteer coordinator, and Chris Yates as communications and sponsorship.

== See also ==
- The Wire, an Australian current affairs program broadcast through the Community Radio Satellite
