= National Indigenous Television =

Australian television channel

- Logo used since 2021
- Country: Australia
- Broadcast area: Nationally
- Network: SBS Television
- Headquarters: Artarmon, New South Wales, Australia

Programming
- Language: English
- Picture format: 1080i HDTV (downscaled to 576i for the SDTV feed)

Ownership
- Owner: Special Broadcasting Service
- Sister channels: SBS; SBS HD; SBS2; SBS World Movies; SBS Food

History
- Launched: 13 July 2007; 19 years ago 12 December 2012; 13 years ago (nationwide free-to-air)
- Replaced: ICTV

Links
- Website: sbs.com.au/nitv/

Availability

Terrestrial
- Freeview: 34 (HD); 36 (SD)

National Indigenous Television (NITV) is an Australian free-to-air television channel that broadcasts programming produced and presented largely by Aboriginal and Torres Strait Islander people. It includes the six-day-a-week NITV News Update, with programming including other news and current affairs programmes, sports coverage, entertainment for children and adults, films and documentaries covering a range of topics. Its primary audience is Indigenous Australians, but many non-Indigenous people tune in to learn more about the history of and issues affecting the country's First Nations peoples.

NITV was initially only carried by cable and satellite providers, along with some limited over-the-air transmissions in certain remote areas. NITV was re-launched in December 2012 by the Special Broadcasting Service (SBS) as a free-to-air channel.

== History ==
=== Predecessors of NITV ===
Indigenous groups and individuals lobbied the Australian Government to fund a nationwide Indigenous television service in the 1980s and 1990s, however no major political party championed this cause.

The Alice Springs (Mparntwe) based Central Australian Aboriginal Media Association received a licence to cover the remote parts of the Northern Territory and South Australia in 1988. With this it launched the Nine Network affiliate Imparja. This licence was later extended to include the remote parts of eastern Australia and Norfolk Island as well. For a time it carried a central Australian news program, and an Indigenous children's program.

In the late 1990s, Imparja launched the free-to-view Imparja Info Channel (also known as Channel 31) on the satellite Optus Aurora service, providing largely Aboriginal programming directly to homes and via a network of BRACS transmitters to remote Aboriginal communities. In 2001, the Alice Springs-based Indigenous Community Television (ICTV) was formed, and organised most of the Aboriginal programming on this channel. In 2004, Imparja stated a desire to run a better funded Indigenous service, at least within its license area.

In the same year, a voluntary NITV Committee was formed and a summit was held in Redfern, Sydney. The summit involved a group of Aboriginal and Torres Strait Islander media professionals and community members committed to the establishment of a national Indigenous broadcasting service.

Following an Australian Government review in 2005, the Government announced $48.5 million in funding for NITV.

Meanwhile, the Imparja Info Channel was replaced by a full-time ICTV channel in 2006.

=== Establishment ===
In 2007, NITV established a head office in Alice Springs and a television arm in Sydney. On 13 July 2007 NITV launched, replacing ICTV on Optus Aurora and in the remote Aboriginal communities it previously reached. It soon after also became available free-to-air on Optus D1 to Australia and eastern Papua New Guinea.

NITV launched on 1 November 2007 on Foxtel and Austar's satellite services on channel 180, with it becoming available on their cable services soon after. It showed Australian programs and sports like The Marngrook Footy Show, and the annual NSW Aboriginal Rugby League Knockout.

On 27 October 2008, NITV was added to Sydney's Digital Forty Four datacasting service on channel 40. On 30 April 2010, this service shut down.

=== Under SBS ===
A government-commissioned review of the Indigenous broadcasting and media sector found that NITV had suffered from governance issues, and needed to improve its relations with Indigenous groups. In April 2010, NITV was granted $15.2 million in interim funding by the Australian government, with continued funding subject to ongoing review. NITV head Tanya Denning made calls for the service to transition to becoming a free-to-air channel. In a 2011 review led by retired senior public servant Neville Stevens, it was found that the channel had "yet to fully meet the expectations of its stakeholders and to fulfil its potential”, and that it needed to undergo a corporate restructuring and reforms to its content acquisition practices. The report also recommended that NITV transition to becoming a free-to-air channel. Another $15.2 million round of funding was issued by the government, while NITV chairman Ken Reys stated that the broadcaster would engage with Minister for Broadband, Communications and the Digital Economy Stephen Conroy on restructuring plans and the possibility of gaining access to a free-to-air channel.

In September 2011, Conroy invited NITV and the Special Broadcasting Service (SBS) to explore the possibility of relocating the network to one of its unused digital terrestrial channels, stating that the government aimed to "ensure that the resources allocated to Indigenous broadcasting are delivering the best outcomes for Indigenous people", and "provide a national platform for free-to-air delivery of predominantly Australian Indigenous content without the creation of a third national broadcaster."

On 8 May 2012, the SBS received $15 million per-year in government funding dedicated to a new free-to-air Indigenous Australian channel, which would replace the existing NITV in July 2012, and assume at least 90% of its staff. It was initially unclear whether this new service would carry the NITV branding, but SBS managing director Michael Ebeid stated that NITV was a well-known brand among Indigenous communities. SBS took over the management and operations of NITV on 1 July 2012, and it was later announced that the channel would be relaunched on 12 December 2012 on Freeview channel 34. NITV's relaunched began with a live special from Uluru, From the Heart of Our Nation, followed by a special episode of Living Black focusing on Indigenous broadcasting and media in Australia. A prime time Celebration Concert was also aired on NITV and SBS One, featuring performances from Uluru by Indigenous musicians.

Tanya Denning-Orman, a Birri Gubba and Guugu Yimidhirr woman was appointed to lead NITV, a position she retains into 2021.

Denning-Orman was appointed SBS's first Director of Indigenous Content in early 2012. On 29 February 2016, SBS unveiled a refreshed brand and revamped schedule for NITV with an increased focus on its central charter, Indigenous news and current affairs. In December 2020, changes were made to NITV's senior content editorial leadership team: Kyas Hepworth (née Sherriff) was appointed Head of Commissioning and Programming; Rhanna Collins to Head of Indigenous News and Current Affairs; Karla Grant, while remaining host of Living Black and Karla Grant Presents, expanded her role, becoming Executive Producer, Living Black & Special Projects.

On 12 December 2021, NITV unveiled an updated logo and branding by indigenous design agency Gilimbaa, which combines SBS's mercator logo with traditional clapsticks, and colors reflecting different terrains of the country. It was accompanied by revisions to its primetime schedule, as well as the new image campaign "Reimagine Australia". The following year, NITV marked its tenth anniversary as a free-to-air channel.

NITV announced in May 2023 that it would be abandoning its official Twitter account, citing the "racism and hate" that the network encounters daily on the platform.

On 31 October 2023, as part of SBS' 2024 upfronts, it was announced that NITV would become a high-definition channel on 5 December 2023, using channel 34. A standard-definition simulcast was also made available on channel 36.

== Programming ==
NITV's line-up focuses on programming of interest to and showcasing Indigenous Australians, including documentaries, current affairs programs, sports, drama, adult animation, and a block of domestic and international children's programming focusing on Indigenous and Aboriginal culture (under the name Jarjums), and films. It also broadcasts programs relating to First Nations culture worldwide.

=== News and current affairs ===
News and current affairs on NITV are covered by NITV News Update, Nula, The Point and Living Black. In December 2020, Rhanna Collins was promoted to Head of Indigenous News and Current Affairs.

NITV News Update is the network's national ten minute news program, broadcast nightly and covering stories relating to Aboriginal and Torres Strait Islander viewers. It is the only nightly television news service that covers entirely Aboriginal and Torres Strait Islander stories from across the country. Started in February 2008, the program began with 5 minutes of news, followed by 15 minutes before extending to a half-hour bulletin. This was later reduced to 10 minutes.

Natalie Ahmat is the news anchor.

=== Sport ===
NITV is Australia's second biggest free-to-air broadcaster of rugby league after the Nine Network. The station has broadcast the Koori Knockout since 2012, and has often shown the annual NRL All Stars match on delay. The network also has a weekly flagship rugby league show, Over the Black Dot. Starting in 2024, the network gained the rights to broadcast one game a week of the European Super League, and the annual World Club Challenge.

In March 2020, a new Australian rules panel show, Yokayi Footy, aimed at a young audience, replaced the Marngrook Footy Show, which ended on the network in late 2019. Yokayi Footy is co-hosted by Tony Armstrong, Bianca Hunt and Darryl White.

=== Other programs ===
Volumz is a music show hosted by Alec Doomadgee, highlighting the best of the Australian Indigenous music scene. It was produced from 2011 to 2012.

Programs in 2018–2019 included:

- First Voices
- Future Dreaming
- Going Places with Ernie Dingo
- Little J and Big Cuz

== Logo and identity history ==
13 July 2007 – 12 December 2012

12 December 2012 – 29 February 2016

29 February 2016 – 12 December 2021

12 December 2021 – present

== See also ==
- Imparja Television
- Indigenous Community Television (ICTV)
- WITBN
