= First Nations Media Australia =

Peak body for Indigenous Australians in the media and communications industry

First Nations Media Australia (FNMA), formerly Indigenous Remote Communications Association (IRCA), is the national peak body for Aboriginal Australian and Torres Strait Islander not-for-profit broadcasting, media and communications.

== History ==
The Indigenous Remote Communications Association Aboriginal and Torres Strait Islanders Corporation (IRCA) was officially established as the peak body for remote Indigenous media and communications in 2001 at the Remote Video Festival held at Umuwa, South Australia.

It expanded its role and representation to become the national peak body for the Aboriginal and Torres Strait Islander broadcasting, media and communications industry in 2016–2017.

== Description and activities ==
As of 2024 FNMA is located in Mparntwe-Alice Springs.

FNMA runs a number of annual events, including the National Remote Indigenous Media Festival, in its 21st year in September 2019.

== Partnerships and joint projects ==
First Sounds is a collaborative effort by the Community Broadcasting Association of Australia (CBAA) and FNMA to get more Aboriginal and Torres Strait Islander artists played and heard on Australian radio music industry.

On 1 June 2021, the Australian Broadcasting Corporation announced a partnership with FNMA for a period of 12 months, with the two organisations sharing knowledge and staff to bring more Indigenous voices and stories to Australian media.

FNMA has had a long association with the Australian Institute of Aboriginal and Torres Strait Islander Studies (AIATSIS), including the digitisation of the institute's huge collection of resources. FNMA has been involved with the establishment of the new facility in Mparntwe-Alice Springs, AIATSIS Central Australia, which was officially opened on 2 February 2024.

== Governance and people ==
Managers of FNMA have included:

- Daniel Featherstone, general manager from 2012 until 2019; oversaw the organisation's transition from IRCA to the national peak body in 2016–2017
- Catherine Liddle, CEO from 14 October 2019 until December 2020
- Dennis Stokes, CEO from January 2021 until December 2022(former CEO of Tandanya National Aboriginal Cultural Institute in Adelaide since 2018)
- Shane Hearn, CEO from 16 January 2023 until February 2024
- Wally Tallis, interim CEO from February 2024

== See also ==
- Indigenous music of Australia
