= Program director =

Occupation in various industries

In service industries, such as education, a program manager or program director researches, plans, develops and implements one or more of the firm's professional services. For example, in education, a program director is responsible for developing and maintaining degree-granting programs and/or other educational services.

In program management, the Program Director is a senior manager responsible for the overall success of the program.

A program director's role in a company that sells professional services is similar to a product manager's role in a company that sells tangible goods.

== Broadcasting ==
In radio or television, a program director or director of programming is the person that decides what radio program or TV program will be broadcast and when.

== Non-profits ==
In the context of non-profit organizations, a program director is responsible for managing one or more of the organization's programs or services in a role similar to that of a chief operating officer.
