= National Ethnic and Multicultural Broadcasters Council =

The National Ethnic & Multicultural Broadcasters’ Council (NEMBC) is the peak body for Australia's ethnic and multilingual community broadcasters. The NEMBC develops national policy, advocates and lobbies on behalf of its members and organises an annual national conference. The council also provides a range of resources to broadcasters such as training programs and advice on funding and grants. It publishes a quarterly newsletter The Ethnic Broadcaster.

== The NEMBC Women's Committee ==
Created in 1995, the Women's Committee was set up to ensure women representation within the NEMBC.

The NEMBC Women's Committee encourages active participation of women broadcasters in education and informing communities on cultural diverse issues and recommends involvement of women decision making.

The Women's Committee aims to encourage and engage women broadcasters in projects to enrich and empower them in their own communities and beyond.

The latest project undertaken by the women's committee is Living Stories Radio Project. The Committee invites all women to participate in the creation of Living Stories. Community members who wish to be interviewed can contact the NEMBC to be put in contact with a broadcaster. Interviews can be recorded in any language.

== See also ==
- Community Broadcasting Association of Australia
- Community Broadcasting Foundation
- Special Broadcasting Service
