= Community Broadcasting Foundation =

Radio funding organisation in Australia

The Community Broadcasting Foundation (CBF) is an independent non-profit funding organisation based in Melbourne. The CBF receives funds from the Australian Government to distribute through grant programs to support the maintenance and development of community broadcasting in Australia.

The mission of the CBF is to assist the Australian community broadcasting sector in becoming well-resourced, independent, diverse and accessible.

The CBF aims to reflect the non-profit volunteer driven philosophy of the community broadcasting sector. As such it operates with a small secretariat and around forty volunteers who sit on various committees advising on grants and projects as well as the board of directors.

== Funding ==
The CBF receives the bulk of its funds from the Australian Government through the Department of Communications.

The Foundation distributes funding through its Grants Advisory Committees. CBF funding is designed to supplement the operational and development costs of the community broadcasting sector. Grants are made for:

- national program production
- online developments including program distribution and exchange
- station infrastructure and operational support
- training
- national infrastructure development projects
- promotion of contemporary Australian music and musicians
- sector coordination and research.

Funding is also provided specifically for Ethnic, Indigenous, and RPH program production. Their home page contains also interesting information very helpful in writing a grant proposals in general.

== See also ==
- Community Broadcasting Association of Australia
- National Ethnic and Multicultural Broadcasters Council
- Radio Print Handicapped Network
- Australian Indigenous Communications Association
