= Community Broadcasting Association of Australia =

- Abbreviation: CBAA
- Legal status: Industry trade group & Charity
- Purpose: Community Broadcasting Peak organisation
- Location: Sydney, Australia
- Region served: Australia
- Members: Community Radio and Television Stations
- Chief Executive: Jon Bisset
- Website: CBAA

The Community Broadcasting Association of Australia (CBAA) is the peak body and the national representative organisation for community radio and television stations in Australia. The CBAA provide leadership, advocacy and support for members to actively provide independent broadcasting services and to build and strengthen local communities. The organisation provides advice and support to community broadcasters regarding a variety of issues.

The CBAA runs the Community Radio Network, offers a national satellite network, that allows community broadcasters to share and syndicate their content, manages the Australian Music Radio Airplay Project (Amrap), CBOnline, a sector information and research unit, runs the digital radio project and publishes CBX magazine. As the peak body for the sector, the CBAA represents the sector through policy submissions, advocacy and campaigns.

The Community Radio Network service has been expanded in recent years with the addition of the Digital Delivery Network (DDN). This project has allowed community radio stations to record and replay programs, interviews, and music from contributing stations within the network.

Recently the association has launched a podcast hosting service, C pod.

The organisation also runs an annual Conference, which brings together representatives from around Australia.

== Member stations ==
The CBAA, as the recognised peak body for community broadcasting in Australia, has members from a diverse range of independently operated not-for-profit community based radio stations.

The station types include:

- General Community (Geographical Area based stations)
- Christian / Religious (Religious stations, usually Christian, now includes Muslim services)
- Youth (Student and general youth stations)
- Indigenous (Indigenous / Aboriginal / Torres Strait Islands)
- Print Handicapped (RPH and affiliates)
- Specialist Music (Broad or specific genre stations - e.g.: Classical, jazz etc.)
- Progressive (used to describe Left leaning, mainly talk based radio services)
- Senior Citizens (Over 60's - oldies music for senior citizens)
- Sport

In most cases, each licensee is the operator of a single station, in some cases with translators and repeaters to provide services in otherwise poor reception areas.

== First Sounds ==
First Sounds is a collaborative effort by the CBAA and First Nations Media Australia to get more Aboriginal and Torres Strait Islander artists played and heard in the Australian radio music industry.

== Member services ==
The CBAA operates to provide advice and representation to the members. It also offers insurance plans for volunteers, music broadcasting rights and news copyright fees at discounted rates for its members.

The CBAA also consults with its members on matters including broadcast licensing, the relevant Code of Practice (Community Radio), and provides training and legal advice.

== History ==
The CBAA was born out of the Public Broadcasting Association of Australia (PBAA). That organisation was founded during the 1970s in response to the rapidly developing sector.

However, changes in funding for the sector during the 1980s sparked a crisis. As government funding was re-directed, the stations were less able to support themselves, or the peak body. This pressure culminated in near bankruptcy for the PBAA.

In 1988 the PBAA was dissolved and from its ashes, the new CBAA arose, under strict financial management, and a focus on membership support.

== See also ==
- Community Broadcasting Foundation
- National Ethnic and Multicultural Broadcasters Council
- Radio Print Handicapped Network
- Australian Indigenous Communications Association
