= Timeline of Australian radio =

== 1800s ==
=== 1890–1899 ===
- Although Australia's first officially recognised experimental broadcast was made in 1905 (see below), there are reliable reports in September 1897 (just two years after Guglielmo Marconi's original radio experiments) of demonstrations of wireless communication in Australia conducted by Professor William Henry Bragg of the University of Adelaide following experiments by Bragg, and at some stage in conjunction with G. W. Selby of Melbourne.
- in September 1899 Edward Hope Kirkby delivers a lecture on wireless telegraphy, citing the works of Clark Maxwell, Hertz and Branley and Marconi’s practical application ending with experiments of wireless telegraphy made on delicately constructed instruments. Newspaper report: Independent (Footscray Vic) Sat 30 Sep 1899.

== 1900s ==
=== 1900–1909 ===
- 1901: The six states federate into the Commonwealth of Australia. Section 51(v) of the Australian Constitution gives the federal government power over "postal, telegraphic, telephonic, and other like services".
- 1905:
  - Wireless Telegraphy Act (1905) placed broadcasting in the control of the Australian Government. This has remained in place ever since.
  - Italian Guglielmo Marconi's company builds Australia's first two-way wireless telegraphy station at Queenscliff, Victoria.
- 1906: first official transmission between Queenscliff and Devonport, Tasmania.

=== 1910–1919 ===
- 1910: The Maritime Wireless Co. Ltd formed by Edward Hope Kirkby, his workers and Father Archibald Shaw
- 1910: March 11th, The Wireless Institute of Australia is formed during a meeting held at the Australia Hotel in Martin Place, Sydney.
- 1911: The Maritime Wireless Co. Ltd sold to The Maritime Wireless Company (Shaw System) Limited
- 1911: Australian Government employs their own wireless expert, Graeme Balsillie, to build the coastal wireless service after interests representing Telefunken didn't perform to the governments satisfaction on the first 2 at Sydney and Perth.
- 1911: Balsillie contracts the Maritime Wireless Company (Shaw System) Limited to manufacture all the apparatus for the remaining 17 wireless including the generators and motors
- 1911: The first long range (520 km) coastal radio station was established in Sydney.
- 1912: The first Coastal wireless station opened in Melbourne
- 1912:
  - The Applecross Wireless Station long range station was established in Western Australia.
  - Shorter range stations were established in Melbourne, Hobart, Brisbane and Adelaide.
- 1913: Marconi and its main competitor Telefunken amalgamated to form AWA.
- 1919: The first radio "broadcast" in Australia was organised by Ernest Thomas Fisk of AWA on 19 August 1919. He arranged for the National Anthem to be broadcast from one building to another at the end of a lecture he'd given on the new medium to the Royal Society of New South Wales.

=== 1920–1929 ===
- 1921:
  - Amateur radio broadcasters commenced transition. The first radio licence in Australia was granted to Charles Maclurcan for station 2CM, which broadcast from the Wentworth Hotel in Sydney, an establishment owned by the Maclurcan family. Broadcasts consisted of classical music concerts on air on Sunday nights.
- 1922:
  - December, "The Regulations: radio laws for the amateur" was issued by the Australian Government. This resulted in Australia's first broadcast licence (2CM in Sydney) being issued to Charles MacLurcan in December 1922.
- 1923:
  - Following intensive lobbying for the introduction of radio broadcasting, the Government, in May 1923, calls a conference of the main players in the radio manufacturing industry. This led to the sealed set regulations where stations could be licensed to broadcast and then sell sets to "listeners-in". The receiving device would be set to receive only that station.
  - 2SB (from 1924, 2BL) in Sydney is the second official station to be licensed. It was first public radio station in Australia opened in Sydney on 23 November 1923. Sydney's first official national radio station, 2FC with Licence No.1 commenced service on 9 January 1924.
- 1924:
  - 3AR and 3LO went to air on 26 January and 13 October 1924 in Melbourne.
  - The Government introduces a two-tiered licence system in July 1924. In the first half of 1924, only 1400 people took out sealed set licences. It was quite easy for listeners to avoid the licence fee by building their own sets or modifying one they had bought to receive more than one station. The radio industry successfully lobbied the Government to introduce a two-tiered system, the "A" licenses to be financed by listeners' licence fees imposed and collected by the Government, and "B" class licenses to be offered to anyone else who wanted to have a go. The B stations would have to generate their own revenue through advertising. A class stations could also advertise but few did. This system was an amalgam of the British system where the non-commercial BBC had a government-imposed monopoly and the USA where the free market was the driving force. The "A" class stations were the original sealed set stations plus one in each other capital city - 2BL, 2FC, 3AR, 3LO, 7ZL, 5CL, 6WF. By years end, 40,000 licences have been issued. At this time, there was also talk of the introduction "C" class stations which would exclusively advertise the products of the station owners(s). This concept was abandoned in 1931, but the Postmaster-General's Department was already in talks with the Akron Broadcasting Co. Pty. Ltd in Melbourne, and, so, in lieu of a "C" class license Akron was given a 'B" Class license with some severe restricting conditions (see 3AK).
  - The first "B" class station on air was 2BE in November 1924.
  - South Australia’s first radio station 5CL (A class) went to air on 20 November.
  - Western Australia's first radio station 6WF went to air on 4 June.
- 1925:
  - The oldest surviving "B" class (commercial) station is 2UE, which went on air on Australia Day 1925 as 2EU. The reputed reason for the change of callsign is that EU sounded like "Hey, You".
  - 3UZ Melbourne begins broadcasting
  - South Australia’s first commercial radio station 5DN goes to air 24 February.
  - 3PB owned by Noel Pemberton Billing began broadcasting in Melbourne in September, mainly to promote Pemberton Billing's Austral Duplex recordings. The station closed in January 1926 after only four months on air. This station has no links whatsoever with the currently-existing 3PB which commenced in 1994 - 3PB now being the official call sign for the Melbourne outlet for ABC NewsRadio.
  - Number of licences issued reaches 80,000.
- 1926: The British Government nationalises radio by buying out the British Broadcasting Company and forming the BBC. The Australian Government held a Royal Commission into Wireless but didn't immediately follow the British lead. It did encourage the "A" class stations to amalgamate in order to maximise efficiencies and maintain standards.
- 1927:
  - AWA conducts a series of transmissions to Britain. These regular broadcasts were heralded by a kookaburra's laugh - a practice that's still used by Radio Australia today, nicknamed "Jacko".
  - 3DB Melbourne commences broadcasting
  - Dr Rumble begins his 'Question Box' on Catholic answers to listeners' questions on 2UE (later 2SM).
- 1929:
  - 2BE closes due to financial collapse.
  - The Government nationalises the transmission facilities and contracts the provision of programming to the Australian Broadcasting Company (now Australian Broadcasting Corporation), a consortium of entertainment interests.

=== 1930–1939 ===
- 1932:
  - The Australian Broadcasting Company is nationalised by the Australian Broadcasting Commission Act (1932). This finalised the two-tier system with the national broadcaster, the newly created Australian Broadcasting Commission, having 12 stations, and the commercial sector, with 43 stations. The ABC was funded by listeners’ licence fees until the 1970s, when Federal Government appropriation became the primary source of funding. Initial plans to permit advertising on the ABC were dropped from the final bill presented to the parliament. The National Broadcasting Symphony Orchestra (later Sydney Symphony Orchestra) was established to provide incidental and concert music on the ABC.
  - On 29 June 1932, 2WG in Wagga Wagga goes on the air on a purpose built 2,000 watt transmitter.
  - At 8.00pm on 1 July 1932, the Prime Minister, Joseph Lyons, inaugurates the ABC. It then controlled 12 stations – 2FC and 2BL in Sydney, 3AR and 3LO in Melbourne, 4QG in Brisbane, 5CL in Adelaide, 6WF in Perth, 7ZL in Hobart and the relay stations 2NC in Newcastle, 2CO at Corowa, 4RK in Rockhampton and 5CK at Crystal Brook.
- 1935:
  - The Sydney studios of the ABC installs a disc recorder, enabling the recording of programs to occur for the first time.
  - Many Australian radio stations change frequencies on 1 Sep 1935 to accord Australian 10 kHz frequency raster and to resolve interference problems.
- 1936: In March, the Bass Strait cable links Tasmania to mainland Australia and permits the ABC to relay national broadcasts to Hobart for the first time.
- 1939: Radio Australia was formally incorporated as part of the ABC.

=== 1940–1949 ===
- 1945:
  - Hector Crawford Productions, later called Crawford Productions, was founded by Hector Crawford and his sister Dorothy Crawford. They would also run the Crawford School of Broadcasting, which taught radio actors such as Noel Ferrier skills for a radio broadcasting career. Crawford Productions as one of the few companies that successfully made a transition from radio to television.
- 1948:
  - Experimental FM broadcasts commence
  - The regulatory body, the Australian Broadcasting Control Board, is created
  - Broadcast of first of 5795 episodes of radio serial Blue Hills.

=== 1950–1959 ===
- 1957: A Government inquiry into FM radio heralds little interest
- 1957: John Laws joins 2UE, beginning 60-year Sydney radio career.
- 1958: Top 40 format is adopted by Australian commercial radio

=== 1960–1969 ===
- 1961: The Government authorises the use of the international VHF FM band for television.
- 1967: Talkback radio began in early 1967 on 6PR in Perth it was later introduced on 2SM in Sydney and 3AW in Melbourne.
- 1968: 3AK Melbourne expands to 24-hour transmission

=== 1970–1979 ===
- 1970:
  - TUNE! FM launches as Australia's first university radio station.
- 1972:
  - The Labor government's Media Minister Doug McClelland abolishes radio and TV licence fees, making the ABC funded directly from the federal budget
  - 5UV in Adelaide becomes the first public radio station on air in Australia
- 1974:
  - The McLean Inquiry into FM rejects the Broadcasting Control Board's views on FM radio and recommends that the VHF FM band be opened to FM radio stations, that a community radio sector be established, and that the ABC have an FM network
  - 2MBS Sydney commences broadcasting as the first full-time FM station in Australia, playing classical music 24 hours a day.
- 1975:
  - 2JJ (Double Jay) commences transmission on the AM band in Sydney. Double Jay is the first non-commercial 24-hour rock station in Australia
  - 3MBS-FM Melbourne commences broadcasting classical music 24 hours a day
  - Multi-cultural radio is launched with the formation of 2EA Sydney and 3EA Melbourne
  - Public access station 3ZZ is established in Melbourne
  - Twelve Australian community radio stations are licensed as an interim move by the federal media minister, Dr Moss Cass. Because the licences may have been technically illegal under the Act, they are dubbed Cass's "Dirty Dozen"
  - Brisbane's 4ZZZ is established, the first community FM broadcaster in Australia
- 1976:
  - ABC FM begins broadcasting, specialising in classical music
  - 3MP begins broadcasting, the first new commercial radio licence in Melbourne since 1935
  - Community radio is launched in Canberra
  - 2MCE begins broadcasting from the campus of Mitchell College of Advanced Education, now Charles Sturt University, Bathurst. The first non-metropolitan community radio station in Australia.
- 1977:
  - 6UVS begins broadcasting from the campus of University of Western Australia, Perth. (6UVS later becomes 6RTR)
- 1978:
  - All AM radio station frequencies are changed from 10 kHz to 9 kHz spacing under the Geneva Frequency Plan of 1975 on 23 November.
  - 2WS Sydney begins broadcasting
- 1979
  - PBS FM starts regular broadcasts on 21 December from the Prince of Wales Hotel studio.

=== 1980–1989 ===
- 1980:
  - The first commercial FM radio stations are launched: Eon FM and Fox FM in Melbourne, Triple M and 2Day FM in Sydney, FM104 in Brisbane, SAFM in Adelaide, 96FM in Perth
- 1982:
  - 7RPH in Hobart becomes the first Radio for the Print Handicapped broadcast service. Other stations soon follow in Melbourne, Sydney, Brisbane, Canberra, Adelaide and Perth
- 1984:
  - Stereo AM radio transmission is launched
  - Robyn Williams creates Ockham's Razor science talk show
- 1985:
  - Alan Jones replaces John Laws as 2UE morning show host
- 1986:
  - 2UE Sydney and 3AK Melbourne launch the experimental CBC Radio Network, a networked talk-back format
- 1988:
  - Commercial FM radio is launched in Canberra
- 1989:
  - Commercial FM radio launches on the Gold Coast
  - Sydney's Triple J begins expansion to other capital cities

=== 1990–1999 ===
- 1990:
  - 3KZ Melbourne converts from AM to FM. Other stations to convert include 3TT Melbourne, 4BK Brisbane, 6PM and 6KY Perth, 5KA and 5DN Adelaide.
  - May 19, 1990, Australia's first S39 supplementary FM Station goes to air in regional Australia as 2VM Moree Launch 2NOW (NOW FM) on 98.3 From Mt Dowe in North West NSW.
  - Commercial FM commences in Hobart
  - 3AK becomes Australia's first Italian-language commercial radio station
- 1991:
  - Melbourne radio station 3XY signs off after 56 years of broadcasting
  - Phillip Adams begins hosting Late Night Live talk show, lasting until 2024
- 1992:
  - 8DN Darwin has its licence revoked for breaching the ownership conditions of the Broadcasting Act
- 1994:
  - 2UW and 2WS Sydney convert to FM
  - 2WZD begins broadcasting in Wagga Wagga as FM93.
  - ABC NewsRadio is launched
- 1998:
  - NetFM broadcasts Australia's first Internet radio transmission.
  - NetFM commence full commercial broadcasting in Sydney on 13 November.

== 2000s ==
=== 2000–2009 ===
- 2000: Triple J New England was first broadcast
- 2001: DMG launches the Nova brand with Sydney's Nova 96.9 first hitting the airwaves.
- 2002: The Australian Broadcasting Corporation commences a digital radio service called DiG in November.
- 2004: 3AK Melbourne becomes an all-sports format as SEN
- 2005:
  - Australian Communications & Media Authority (ACMA) is formed on 1 July 2005 by the merger of the Australian Communications Authority (ACA) and the Australian Broadcasting Authority (ABA)
- 2006: Melbourne radio stations 3AW and Magic swap frequencies on the AM band
- 2009: Digital radio officially launches in Sydney, Melbourne, Brisbane, Adelaide and Perth.

=== 2010–present ===
- 2011
  - Aussie.fm launches its free online radio portal dedicated to Australian radio.
- 2014
  - Macquarie Radio Network and Fairfax Radio Network merger is announced in December.
  - Fairfax Radio Network sells 96FM Perth to Australian Radio Network ahead of Macquarie merger.
- 2015
  - Macquarie Radio Network and Fairfax Radio Network merger is approved, with 2CH Sydney and 4LM Mount Isa to be sold.
- 2018
  - Alan Jones and the radio stations that broadcast him ordered to pay $3.7 million in damages to the Wagner family over claims of responsibility for the 2010–11 Queensland floods.

== See also ==
- Timeline of radio
- History of broadcasting
- Media of Australia
