= 5RPH =

Radio reading service in Adelaide, South Australia

- Last logo used by RPH Adelaide before becoming a Vision Australia Radio network station.

Australia
- Broadcast area: Adelaide
- Frequency: 1197 kHz AM

Programming
- Format: Radio reading service
- Affiliations: Radio Print Handicapped Network; Vision Australia Radio

Ownership
- Owner: Vision Australia; (5RPH Pty Ltd)
- Sister stations: 3RPH; 6RPH

History
- Call sign meaning: 5 = South Australia; Radio for the Print; Handicapped

Technical information
- Class: Community radio
- Transmitter coordinates: 34.931197°S 138.571406°E

Links
- Website: Official website

Radio 5RPH (1197 kHz) is a volunteer operated AM band community radio station in Adelaide, South Australia, providing a radio reading service for the vision-impaired and otherwise print handicapped.

Originally owned by association RPH Adelaide Inc., 5RPH has operated as a subsidiary of Vision Australia Radio since December 2011, combining readings by local volunteers of South Australian media with programs from VA Radio's sister stations, such as 3RPH from Melbourne.

Radio 5RPH is a member of the Radio Print Handicapped Network. Its stated mission is to "provide a quality reading and information service to those within its broadcast area who are unable (for whatever reason) to access daily printed material".

Newspapers, magazines, books, and other printed material are read to air. The station also hosts a morning sports show weekday mornings and has previously broadcast matches from the South Australian National Football League.

== See also ==
- List of radio stations in Australia
- Radio Print Handicapped Network
