= 3GPH =

Vision Australia Radio (3GPH)
Repeater of 3RPH Melbourne

Geelong, Victoria; Australia
- Broadcast area: Geelong RA2
- Frequency: FM: 99.5 MHz

Programming
- Format: Radio reading service
- Network: Vision Australia Radio
- Affiliations: RPH Australia

Ownership
- Owner: Vision Australia; (Vision Australia Limited)

History
- Call sign meaning: Geelong Radio for the Print Handicapped

Technical information
- Licensing authority: ACMA
- ERP: 800 W
- Transmitter coordinates: 38.173546°S 144.300291°E

Links
- Public licence information: Profile
- Website: radio.visionaustralia.org/our-networks/geelong-99-5fm

3GPH is a community radio station owned and operated by Vision Australia as part of the Vision Australia Radio network. The station broadcasts a radio reading service to Geelong, Victoria, with 18 hours of local programming each week.

Outside of local hours, the station is a repeater of the 3RPH service from Melbourne.
