= 3SPH =

Australia
- Broadcast area: Shepparton, Victoria
- Frequency: 100.1 MHz FM
- Branding: Vision Australia Radio

Programming
- Format: Radio reading service
- Affiliations: Radio Print Handicapped Network

Ownership
- Owner: Vision Australia

Technical information
- Class: Community
- Transmitter coordinates: 36.3625°S 145.6961°E

Links
- Website: www.visionaustralia.org.au/radio

3SPH is a radio station based in Shepparton, Victoria. It is part of the Vision Australia Radio network, a reading and information service for those persons unable to read or easily access information in print. The station is run and operated by volunteers.

When not broadcasting local programs, the station is a relay of 3RPH in Melbourne.
