= Radio Print Handicapped Network =

Australian radio reading services network

RPH Australia is the national peak representative organisation for a unique Australian network of radio reading services designed to meet the daily information needs of people who, for any reason, are unable to access printed material. It is estimated that 22% of the Australian population has a print disability (over 5 million).

== History ==
Historically, RPH stood for "Radio for the Print Handicapped", and these services began in Australia in 1975 on Melbourne's 3ZZ.

On 23 July 1978, the Minister for Post and Telecommunications announced, "The establishment of a special radio communications service for the blind and other people with reading difficulties."

The federal government began its direct funding of the service with a $250,000 grant in the 1981–82 budget.

Initially using marine band (today's extended AM broadcast band) frequencies, stations in Hobart, Melbourne, and Sydney began operating. 7RPH Hobart went to air in June 1982. 3RPH Melbourne was officially opened in December the same year.

By 1984–85, RPH services were also operating in Brisbane and Canberra. After another review, the specialised stations of the service transferred to normal broadcast band frequencies in 1990 and 1991.

Material from the network is heard on a small number of non-network community stations in Australia and on the Radio Reading Service of New Zealand.

In December 2013, all RPH Australia network stations joined the new VAST satellite platform.

== RPH Australia Radio Reading Network Stations ==
=== Radio 1RPH ===
- Canberra: 1125 kHz AM and DAB+
- Wagga Wagga: 89.5 MHz FM
- Junee: 99.5 FM (retransmission by Junee Shire Council)
- Internet stream: www.radio1rph.org.au
- Australia: Viewer Access Satellite Television, radio channel 632

=== 2RPH ===
- Sydney: 1224 kHz AM and DAB+
- Sydney Eastern Suburbs: 100.5 MHz FM and DAB+
- Newcastle: 100.5 MHz FM
- Wollongong: 93.3 MHz FM
- Australia: Viewer Access Satellite Television, radio channel 632

=== 4RPH ===
- Brisbane: 1296 kHz AM and DAB+
- Australia: Viewer Access Satellite Television, radio channel 632

=== Vision Australia Radio (3RPH) ===
- Albury: 2APH 101.7 MHz FM
- Bendigo: 3BPH 88.7 MHz FM
- Darwin, Northern Territory: 3RPH DAB+
- Geelong: 3GPH 99.5 kHz FM
- Melbourne: 3RPH 1179 kHz AM and DAB+
- Mildura: 3MPH 107.5 MHz FM
- Shepparton: 3SPH 100.1 MHz FM
- Warragul: 3RPH 93.5 MHz FM
- Warrnambool: 3RPH 882 kHz AM
- Australia & New Zealand: Optus Aurora, radio channel 12 (Melbourne feed)?? VAST
- Australia: Viewer Access Satellite Television, radio channel 632

=== 5RPH ===
- Adelaide: 1197 kHz AM and DAB+
- Australia: Viewer Access Satellite Television, radio channel 632

=== 990 Vision Australia Radio, Perth (6RPH) ===
- Perth: 990 kHz AM and DAB+
- Australia: Viewer Access Satellite Television, radio channel 632

=== Print Radio Tasmania (7RPH) ===
- Hobart: 864 kHz AM and DAB+
- Launceston: 106.9 MHz FM
- Devonport: 96.1 MHz FM
- Australia: Viewer Access Satellite Television, radio channel 632

== NDIS ==
In February 2016, funding from the National Disability Insurance Scheme (NDIS) was called into question after July 2016, with 1RPH being the first station to have funding from previous Disability services sources withdrawn.

== See also ==
- Community Broadcasting Association of Australia
- Community Broadcasting Foundation
