= Vision Australia Radio =

Community Radio network in Australia

- Australia

Programming
- Format: Radio reading service
- Affiliations: Radio Print Handicapped Network

Ownership
- Owner: Vision Australia

Technical information
- Class: Community

Links
- Webcast: Live online stream (multiple stations)
- Website: varadio.org

Vision Australia Radio is a network of eight radio stations in Victoria, amongst some other states in Australia. It is owned by Vision Australia. The stations broadcast a range of programs, generally consisting of readings of newspapers and magazines for people unable to read print media. All the stations are operated by a volunteer staff and a small group of employees.

The Vision Australia Radio Network is headquartered at Kooyong and is licensed as a Community (RPH) Broadcaster to the print-handicapped community. This can include people with vision impairment, a physical illness or disability which makes it difficult for them to hold a paper (such as MS, or Parkinson's), people with dyslexia or those who understand spoken but not written English.

A recent McNair Ingenuity Research study showed that Vision Australia Radio has a statewide audience of more than 250,000 every week – with the majority of listeners aged between 25 and 54. An estimated 38% of listeners are professionals or self-employed with a further 36% skilled workers.

The station originally broadcast as 3RPH in 1982 from Melbourne, however the station is now formally known as Vision Australia Radio.

VA Radio has since expanded beyond Victoria, assuming operations of Adelaide's 5RPH in 2011, and Perth's 6RPH in 2015.

Vision Australia Radio is a member of the Radio Print Handicapped Network and a BBC World Service partner station.

== Network stations ==
=== Melbourne flagship ===
- 3RPH DAB+ Melbourne

=== Victorian regional stations ===
These stations are affiliates and opt out of the 3RPH feed for local programmes:

- 2APH 101.7 MHz FM Albury-Wodonga
- 3BPH 88.7 MHz FM Bendigo
- 3GPH 99.5 MHz FM Geelong
- 3MPH 107.5 MHz FM Mildura
- 3SPH 100.1 MHz FM Shepparton

In addition, two translator stations (sharing the 3RPH callsign of the Melbourne station) relay other VA Radio stations' programming without originating their own:

- 3RPH 93.5 MHz FM Warragul (relays Melbourne)
- 3RPH 882 kHz AM Warrnambool (relays Geelong, previously 94.5 MHz FM)

=== Stations outside Victoria ===
- 5RPH, formerly branded RPH Adelaide: DAB+, Adelaide
- 6RPH, formerly branded Information Radio 6RPH: 990 kHz AM, Perth
- 8RPH: DAB+, Darwin

The Melbourne station is also heard in Australia via VAST satellite radio.
