= 3RPH Warrnambool =

Radio station in Victoria, Australia

Australia
- Broadcast area: Warrnambool, Victoria
- Frequency: 882 kHz AM
- Branding: Vision Australia Radio

Programming
- Format: Radio reading service
- Affiliations: Radio Print Handicapped Network

Ownership
- Owner: Vision Australia

Technical information
- Class: Community
- Transmitter coordinates: 38.3049°S 142.7379°E

Links
- Website: radio.visionaustralia.org

3RPH Warrnambool (callsign 3RPH/T) is a radio station based in Warrnambool, Victoria. It is part of the Vision Australia Radio network, a reading and information service for those persons unable to read or easily access information in print. The station is run and operated by volunteers.

There is another station in the network with the same 3RPH/T callsign, 3RPH Warragul

When not broadcasting local programs, the station is a relay of 3RPH in Melbourne.

On July 2, 2018, 3RPH swapped frequencies with 3YB to allow them to broadcast on 94.5 FM MHz. In addition, 3YB donated $25,000 to the Vision Australia Warrnambool Branch and 3RPH new 882 Frequency extended from 800 to 2,000 Watts covering the entire South West.
