= 2APH =

Australia
- Broadcast area: Albury-Wodonga
- Frequency: FM: 101.7 MHz
- Branding: Vision Australia Radio

Programming
- Format: Radio reading service
- Affiliations: Vision Australia Radio

Ownership
- Owner: Vision Australia

Technical information
- Class: Community
- Transmitter coordinates: 36.020°S 146.962°E

Links
- Website: www.visionaustralia.org.au/radio

2APH is a radio station based in Albury-Wodonga. It is part of the Vision Australia Radio network, a reading and information service for those persons unable to read or easily access information in print. The station is operated by volunteers.

When not broadcasting local programs, the station is a relay of 3RPH in Melbourne.
