= 3RPH/T =

3RPH/T is the call sign of two radio stations in Victoria, Australia, both part of the Vision Australia Radio network:

- 3RPH Warragul
- 3RPH Warrnambool
