= 3RPH Warragul =

Coordinates: 38.163058°S 145.93086°E

Australia
- Broadcast area: Warragul, Victoria
- Frequency: 93.5 MHz FM
- Branding: Vision Australia Radio

Programming
- Format: Radio reading service
- Affiliations: Radio Print Handicapped Network

Ownership
- Owner: Vision Australia

Technical information
- Class: Community

Links
- Website: www.visionaustralia.org.au/radio

3RPH Warragul (callsign 3RPH/T) is a radio station based in Warragul, Victoria. It is part of the Vision Australia Radio network, a reading and information service for those persons unable to read or easily access information in print. The station is run and operated by volunteers.

There is another station in the network with the same 3RPH/T callsign, 3RPH Warrnambool

When not broadcasting local programs, the station is a relay of 3RPH in Melbourne.
