= 2RPH =

Radio reading service in Sydney, Australia

Coordinates: 33°52′42″S 151°11′07″E

- Australia
- Broadcast area: Sydney
- Frequencies: 1224 kHz AM 100.5 MHz FM Eastern Sydney; 100.5 MHz FM Newcastle; 93.3 MHz FM Wollongong Radio Channel 7 – Optus Aurora C1 Satellite – (Free To Air)

Programming
- Format: Radio reading service
- Affiliations: Radio Print Handicapped Network

Ownership
- Owner: Radio 2RPH Co-operative Ltd

History
- First air date: 18 April 1983
- Call sign meaning: 2 = New South Wales; Radio for the Print; Handicapped

Technical information
- Class: Community radio

Links
- Webcast: Sydney; Newcastle and Lower Hunter; Wollongong and Illawarra (direct MP3 streams)
- Website: Official website

2RPH is an Australian radio reading service that reads newspapers and magazines for the benefit of those who have difficulties reading for themselves. It is the Sydney station of the RPH Network.

The 2RPH Sydney and 3RPH Melbourne were available free to air (no smartcard required) on the Optus Aurora radio platform via Optus C1 before the switch over to the more restrictive VAST platform. Now only the 3RPH Melbourne service is the only RPH service available free-to-air on Optus C1.

== History ==
The need for a radio reading service was realised in New South Wales in 1983 with the establishment of 2RPH as a Community Benefit Organisation, incorporated as a Co-operative Society. The station began operating on 18 April 1983.

The first broadcast frequency was off the main broadcast band (1629 kHz), and was thus unsuitable, as many people could not receive the station. The problem was partly resolved by a move to a more suitable band location (1539 kHz, in 1991), and further in 1993 when the Commonwealth Government provided the station with transmission facilities previously used by commercial station 2WS. These facilities are still in use and provide a strong signal to most parts of Greater Sydney and some suburbs outside the metropolitan area.

In 2023, the station changed its name from Radio for the Print Handicapped NSW Cooperative Limited to Radio 2RPH Co-operative Limited. This was in response to the word handicapped being no longer acceptable in current Australian and global usage.

== Audience ==
Though specifically designed for the vision-impaired, elderly, and infirm, its accessibility and clear announcers are used by English as a second language instructors to help their students understand the printed materials read from.

== Programming ==
Volunteers prepare, produce, and present all the programs, including readings from magazines and other publications, which are pre-recorded. Many of these recorded programs are re-broadcast by RPH stations in other parts of Australia and the Radio Reading Service in New Zealand. 2RPH is the largest supplier of programs to the national network feed.

Applicants for on-air work must pass an audition carefully designed to demonstrate their skills at reading aloud. Volunteer positions are often available for behind-the-scenes duties.

== See also ==
- List of radio stations in Australia
- Radio Print Handicapped Network
- Community Radio Network (Australia)
