= 1125 AM =

AM radio frequency

The following radio stations broadcast on AM frequency 1125 kHz:

== Australia ==
- 1RPH in Canberra

== United Kingdom ==
- BBC Radio Wales Extra
