= Print Radio Tasmania =

Radio reading service in Hobart, Australia

Coordinates: 42°53′25.0″S 147°19′21.5″E

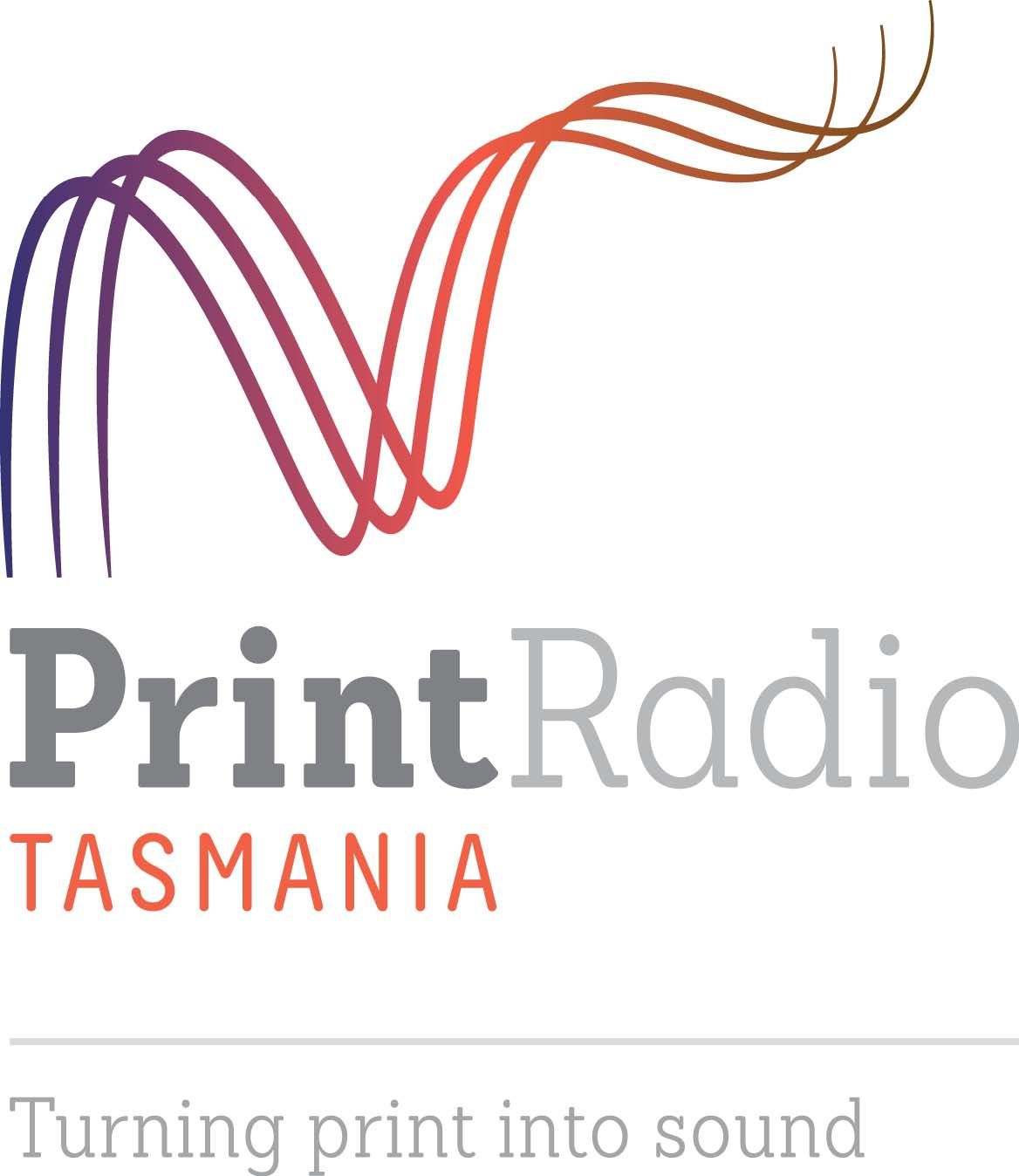
- Australia
- Broadcast area: Hobart and Launceston and Devonport
- Frequency: 864 kHz AM (Hobart)

Programming
- Format: Radio reading service
- Affiliations: Radio Print Handicapped Network

Ownership
- Owner: RPH Print Radio Tasmania Inc.

History
- Call sign meaning: 7 = Tasmania; Radio for the Print; Handicapped

Technical information
- Class: Community radio
- Power: 864 AM: 5 kW, 106.9 FM: 3.2 kW
- Repeaters: 106.9 MHz FM Launceston; 96.1 MHz FM Devonport

Links
- Website: Official website

Print Radio Tasmania (callsign 7RPH) is a radio station based in Hobart, Tasmania. It is a reading and information service for those persons unable to read or easily access information in print. The station is run by an elected Committee of Management, two paid positions, Broadcast Manager and an Administration / Volunteer Coordinator backed by a dedicated group of volunteers.

Programs broadcast range from live reading of local and national newspapers to digital and paper magazines and serialised book readings.

Print Radio Tasmania was the first RPH station to go on-air in Australia on 26 June 1982, originally broadcasting on 1620 AM. In 1991 the station changed frequency to 864 AM. In December 2003 a second transmitter was established in Northern Tasmania to relay the station to Launceston and the Tamar Valley on 106.9 FM. In February 2013 a third transmitter was established to relay the station to Devonport on 96.1 FM.

7RPH is a member of the RPH Network and is a rebroadcaster of the BBC World Service and Community Radio Network.

== History ==
The Radio for the Print Handicapped movement was established in Australia in the mid-1970s, and was many years in the planning stages before it went to air. Developed by print disabled people, it was seen by its founders as vital in providing print disabled people with the same access to information as any other group in the community.

In July 1978 the then minister in charge of communications, Tony Staley, granted licences around Australia for the provision of RPH services.

With assistance from state and federal governments, the Station 7RPH was established. The state government also provided a transmitter site on Mount Nelson. On Saturday 26 June 1982 7RPH commenced daily programming from 73 Montague Street, New Town, and was the first RPH Radio Station anywhere in Australia to do so.

In Southern Tasmania 7RPH was heard on the AM frequency of 1620.

In 1991, with government assistance and a new licence, 7RPH moved their frequency to 864AM and to their present building at 136 Davey Street. It has now been fitted out with four studios and provides an area for volunteers as well as an administrative office.

A new transmitter was built at Rushy Lagoon, Sandford and 7RPH was able to provide an improved service to a wider audience.

The service areas covered are the municipalities of Brighton, Bruny, Clarence, Glenorchy, Green Ponds, Hobart, Huon, Kingborough, Port Cygnet, Richmond, Glamorgan/Spring Bay and Tasman.

In December 2003, the station commenced transmissions via a translator service to Launceston, the Tamar Valley and surrounding townships on a frequency of 106.9FM.

The association established to operate 7RPH was called Broadcast Services for the Handicapped Incorporated, which was changed at the 2004 Annual General Meeting to RPH Print Radio Tasmania Incorporated, reflecting not only the station's wider broadcast area in the State, but also societal changes towards people with a print disability.

Print Radio Tasmania (PRT) is 'on air' continuously, commencing local programming at 8am and concluding at midnight each day. Then, via satellite, it broadcasts the BBC World Service overnight and the Community Radio Network programming.

== See also ==
- List of radio stations in Australia
- Radio Print Handicapped Network
