= 4RPH =

Reading Radio (formally Radio 4RPH)
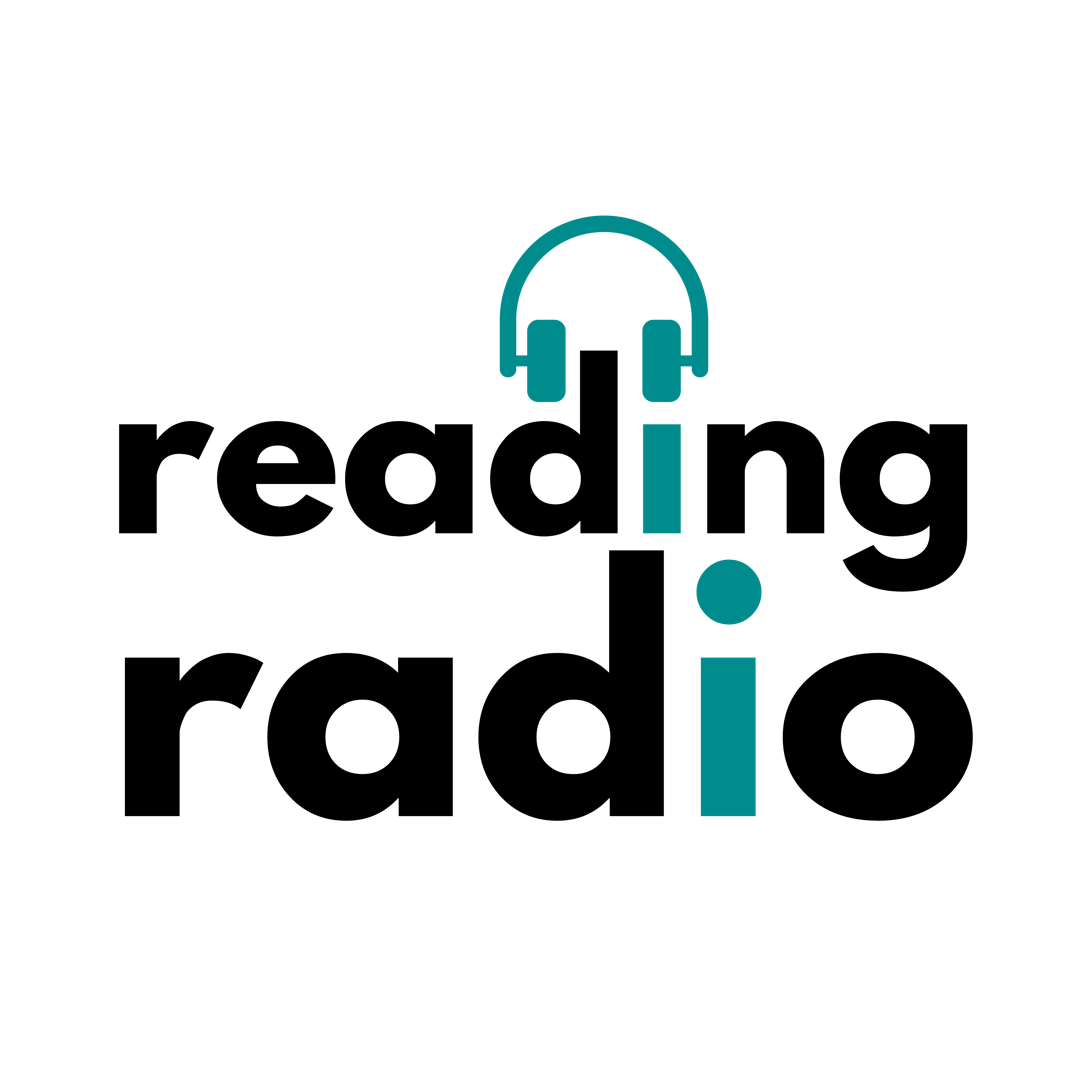
- Brisbane, Queensland; Australia
- Broadcast area: Brisbane RA1
- Frequency: 1296 kHz AM

Programming
- Language: English
- Format: Radio reading service
- Affiliations: Radio Print Handicapped Network

Ownership
- Owner: Queensland Radio for the Print Handicapped Ltd

History
- First air date: 24 September 1990
- Former call signs: 4RPH
- Call sign meaning: 4 = Queensland; Radio for the Print; Handicapped

Technical information
- Power: 5,000 watts
- Transmitter coordinates: 27°27′47″S 153°7′23″E

Links
- Webcast: Live stream listen online
- Website: Official website

Reading Radio (formerly 4RPH and part of the Radio Print Handicapped Network), services was started as a part of Melbourne's 3ZZ service in 1975. It was during this time that Radio 4RPH founder, Spero Dragona, first held a public forum in Brisbane to discuss starting something similar in Brisbane.

== History ==
In 1978, the Minister for Post and Telecommunications put the might of the government behind the idea and announced funding for “special radio communications service for the blind and other people with reading difficulties.” With this funding Queensland Radio for the Print Handicapped Limited was established and started broadcasting the daily newspapers for an hour each morning on Classical community radio station 4MBS.

Spero kept pushing for the station to have a signal of its own and his persistence paid off. In February 1984, Radio 4RPH launched as its own dedicated radio service. Currently, the station broadcasts on 1296AM, DAB+, and streams online. The organisation is a not-for-profit charity business that uses grants, sponsorship, and donations to operate.

In 1991, Station Manager, Ralph Gray, recruited Ed Richardson as a technician. At the time, Robert Harris was volunteering as Book Keeper/ Treasurer. Brendan Taggart, George Lovejoy and Bill Gibson contributed their experience and time to help keep the station afloat. Ed remained a constant and was left in charge in 1993. In 1995, he was awarded a lifetime membership. By June 2017, as manager, and still volunteering, he had relocated the station three times.

In 2017, Scott Black then took over and was able to modernise the sound and equipment. The board then purchased the current premises in Morris Towers. Scott was followed by Paul Price as acting Station Manager and now, in 2023, Chris Corcoran came on board.

The vital contributions of blind Announcers and Technical Producers, Marty Rankin, Steve Sparrow, Steve Richardson, Paul Price, Vaughan Bennison and Geoff Shang must also be highlighted. Finally, it is important to recognise the essential role played by the wonderful team of volunteers who continue to announce, read and contribute to the stations sub-committees.

== Audience and rebranding ==
Historically, Radio 4RPH catered to an over 60s, vision impaired, and blind communities. However, in 2017 the station began its most ambitious reinvention. The mission of creating a station that continued its historical purpose creating informative content for those with a print disability, but also expanding the station's reach to more communities. “Empowerment through Information” was chosen as the new branding to reflect that Radio 4RPH was not passively delivering its audience the news but engaging them through it.

The station started from the ground up, improving the station's Spring Hill Studios by replacing the 30-plus-year-old equipment, rebranding the station with a new logo and signage, restructuring the organisation, and engaging with its volunteers, members, and the community.

In 2019, the station rebranded to Reading Radio 4RPH as a temporary brand change on our way to our current name Reading Radio.

== See also ==
- List of radio stations in Australia
- Radio Print Handicapped Network
