= Monte Cristo Homestead =

Supposed Haunted homestead

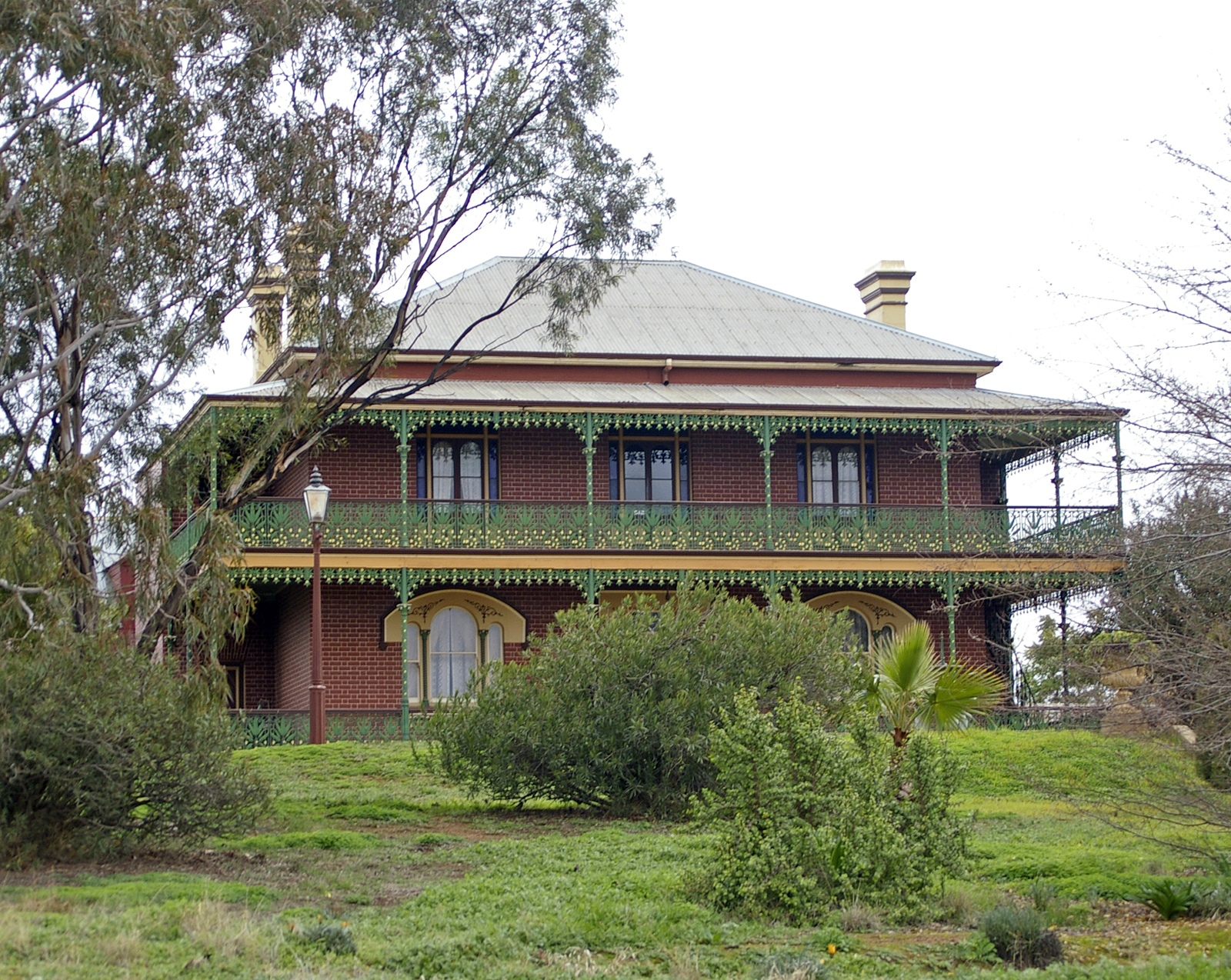
- Monte Cristo Homestead in 2009
- Interactive map of the Monte Cristo Homestead area

General information
- Status: Completed
- Type: Homestead
- Architectural style: Victorian
- Location: Junee, New South Wales, Australia
- Coordinates: 34.8687°S 147.577°E
- Completed: 1885; 141 years ago

Technical details
- Floor count: 2

Monte Cristo Homestead is a historic homestead located in the town of Junee, New South Wales, Australia. Constructed by local pioneer Christopher William Crawley in 1885, it is a double-storey late-Victorian-style manor standing on a hill overlooking the town.

The Crawley family remained in residence until 1948. The house then stood empty under the care of several caretakers until 1963, when it was purchased by Reg and Olive Ryan, who arrested its decay and largely restored it to a habitable condition.

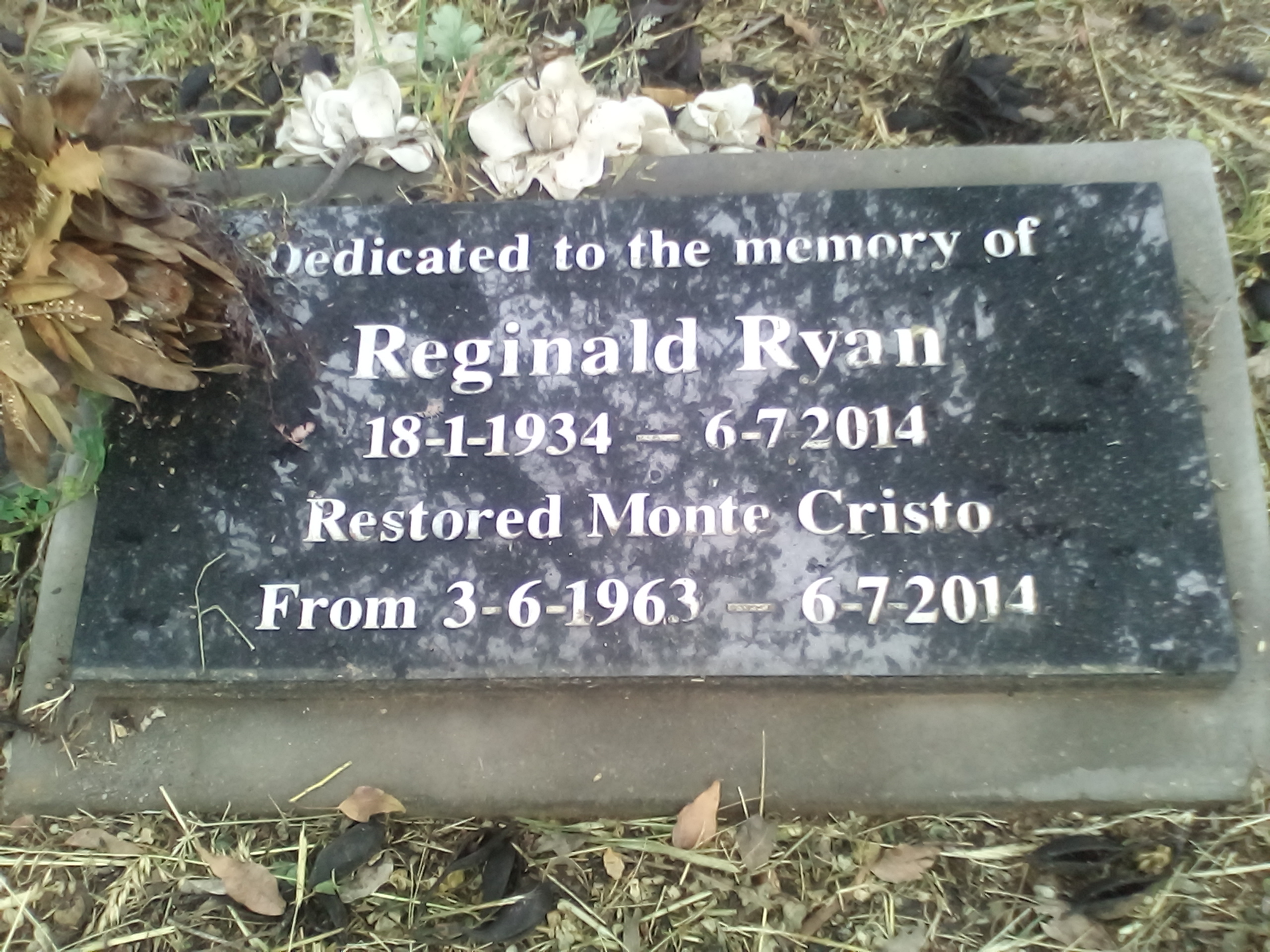
Memorial to Reg Ryan

The homestead once operated as a museum and antiques showcase, and tourist attraction with curio/souvenir shop, advertising itself as "Australia's most haunted house".

Monte Cristo was featured in television shows such as A Big Country in 1977, the travel show Getaway in 1992, the paranormal based game/reality show Scream Test in 2000, Ghost Hunters International in January 2010, and My Ghost Story in 2013. It was also the focus of the 2012 mockumentary horror film Muirhouse.

After the death of Olive Ryan, her family decided to end tourism operations. Subsequently, Monte Cristo Homestead is no longer open to the public after January 2025.

== Lawrence Legend ==
Born Lawrence Ryan on 28 March 1971 in Junee, Legend is a stunt motorcyclist. He obtained his first motorcycle when aged 14 and has since gone on to become a proficient stunt rider.

Legend is a member of the Ryan family who once operated Monte Cristo Homestead as a tourist drawcard and "haunted house". Legend once jumped his motorbike over the two-storey homestead, using ramps, and in its heyday the tourist area carried extensive documentation of the feat.

He co-wrote with Michelene Ryan a children's book entitled The Adventures of Lawrence Legend about two school classmates waiting for the arrival of Legend to their school.
