= The Minnesota Radio Talking Book Network =

The Minnesota Radio Talking Book Network was the world's first radio reading service for the blind; the first on-air date was January 2, 1969. The purpose of a radio reading service is to make current print material available, through the medium of a radio, to those who cannot read it because of a physical condition such as blindness, visual disability, dyslexia, or strokes. In 1969, no other options were available to blind and visually impaired people.

The Minnesota Radio Talking Book Network, at that time called the Radio Talking Book, was started as a side-channel radio on KSJR-FM, itself fairly new at the time. KSJR began on January 22, 1967, as a classical radio station belonging to St. John's University, and was called MER, Minnesota Educational Radio. In 1974, the station's name was changed to Minnesota Public Radio (MPR).

In 1967 and 1968, conversations took place between Father Colman Barry, OSB, president of St. John's University, William Kling, manager of the station, and C. Stanley Potter, Director of the State Services for the Blind from 1948 to 1985. It was decided to make the Radio Talking Book part of the Hamm Recording Project, which the Hamm Foundation began in 1953 as a public-private partnership in association with Minnesota State Services for the Blind. In 1953, the Hamm Recording Project's purpose was to make textbooks, Minnesota magazines, and Minnesota authors available in an audio format to blind and visually impaired people. By 1969, the project was known as the Communication Center, was also providing Braille for Minnesotans, and had expanded its volunteer base considerably. It seemed an obvious location for the Radio Talking Book.

With the assistance of Communication Center engineer Robert Watson, a closed-circuit radio was designed that would pick up only the signal of the new Radio Talking Book, and the station began. The initial schedule had the Minneapolis Tribune newspaper read live on air for two hours each morning, the Saint Paul Dispatch for two hours each evening, and the remainder of the hours filled with programming from just over 20 magazines and a wide variety of books read serially.

Today, that programming is two hours of the combined Minneapolis and Saint Paul papers in the morning, one hour of The New York Times in the evening, 11 hours per day of programming from serialized current-copyright books, and programming from over 300 periodicals. The programming is interrupted in six smaller Minnesota cities by teams of volunteers reading local newspapers. The programming is carried on satellite, where it is picked up by many other radio reading services across the hemisphere, and it is streamed online. Copies of all books the Minnesota Radio Talking Book Network records are also made available to blind, visually impaired, and other print-disabled Americans through the Minnesota Braille and Talking Book Library.

The inauguration of a radio reading service inspired others around the country to begin similar services. By 1975, there were enough of them that they decided to create the Association of Radio Reading Services, headed by C. Stanley Potter. That organization eventually became the International Association of Audio Information Reading Services, IAAIS, and includes member services that provide access to the printed word in any audio format.

== See also ==
- West German Audio Book Library for the Blind
