= Junee Post Office =

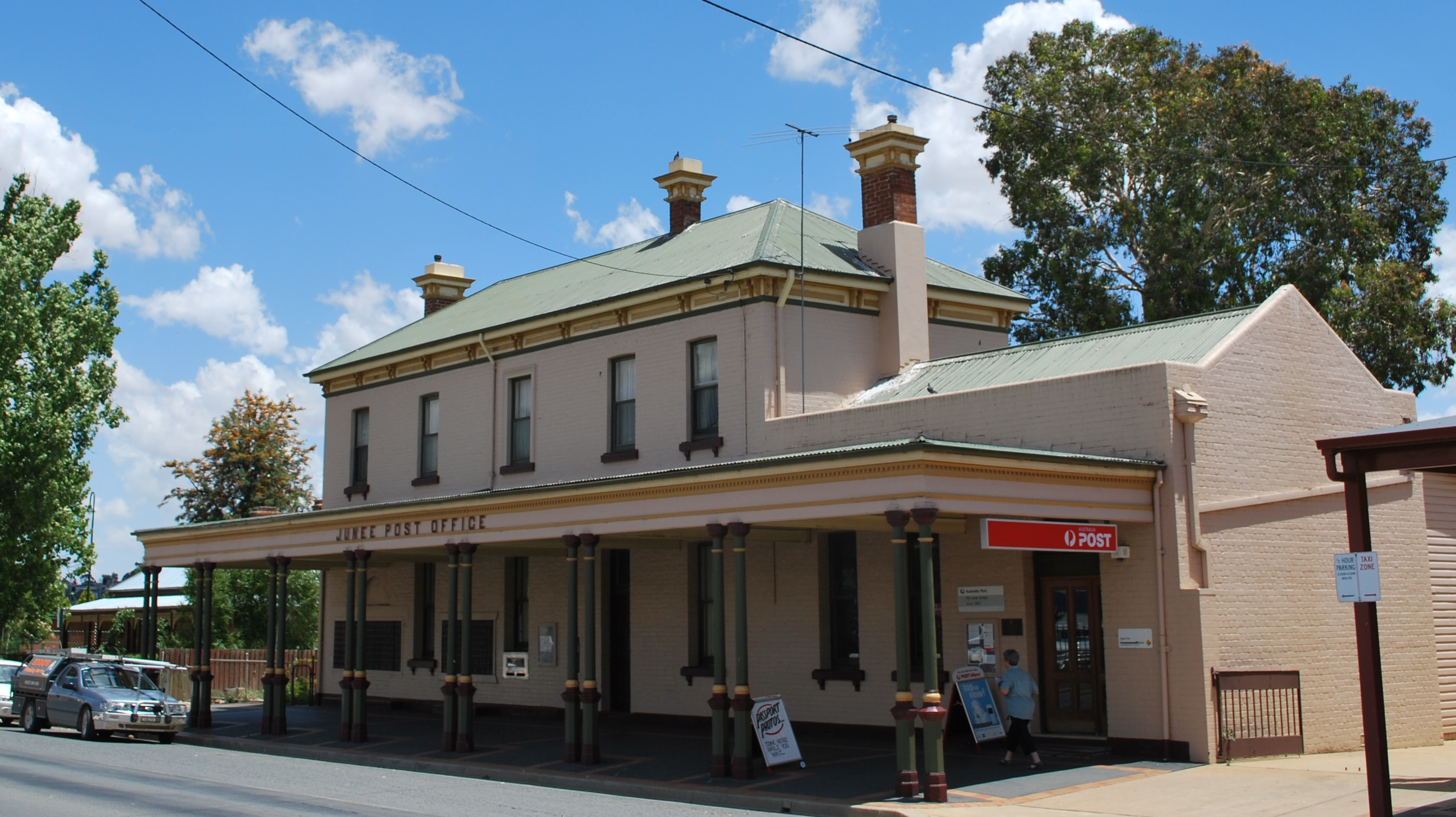

- Location within New South Wales Location within Australia
- 34.8712°S 147.5843°E
- Location: 119 Lorne Street, Junee, New South Wales, Australia

Site notes
- Architect: Colonial Architect's Office under James Barnet
- Owner: Australia Post

New South Wales Heritage Register
- Official name: Junee Post Office; Post Office
- Type: state heritage (built)
- Designated: 22 December 2000
- Reference no.: 1425
- Type: Post Office
- Category: Postal and Telecommunications
- Builders: Gatby and Flock

Junee Post Office is a heritage-listed post office at 119 Lorne Street, Junee, New South Wales, Australia. It was designed by Designed by the Colonial Architect's Office under James Barnet and built by Gatby and Flock. The property is owned by Australia Post.

== History ==
=== Background ===
The first official postal service in Australia was established in April 1809, when the Sydney merchant Isaac Nichols was appointed as the first Postmaster in the colony of New South Wales. Prior to this, mail had been distributed directly by the captain of the ship on which the mail arrived, however this system was neither reliable nor secure.

In 1825 the colonial administration was empowered to establish a Postmaster General's Department, which had previously been administered from Britain.

In 1828 the first post offices outside of Sydney were established, with offices in Bathurst, Campbelltown, Parramatta, Liverpool, Newcastle, Penrith and Windsor. By 1839 there were forty post offices in the colony, with more opened as settlement spread. During the 1860s, the advance of postal services was further increased as the railway network began to be established throughout NSW. In 1863, the Postmaster General WH Christie noted that accommodation facilities for Postmasters in some post offices was quite limited, and stated that it was a matter of importance that "post masters should reside and sleep under the same roof as the office".

The first telegraph line was opened in Victoria in March 1854 and in NSW in 1858. The NSW colonial government constructed two lines from the General Post Office, Sydney, one to the South Head Signal Station, the other to Liverpool. Development was slow in NSW compared to the other states, with the Government concentrating on the development of country offices before suburban ones. As the line spread, however, telegraph offices were built to accommodate the operators. Unlike the Post Office, the telegraph office needed specialised equipment and could not be easily accommodated in a local store or private residence. Post and telegraph offices operated separately until 1870 when the departments were amalgamated, after which time new offices were built to include both postal and telegraph services. In 1881 the first telephone exchange was opened in Sydney, three years after the first tests in Adelaide. As with the telegraph, the telephone system soon began to extend into country areas, with telephone exchanges appearing in country NSW from the late 1880s onwards. Again the Post Office was responsible for the public telephone exchange, further emphasising its place in the community as a provider of communications services.

The appointment of James Barnet as Acting Colonial Architect in 1862 coincided with a considerable increase in funding to the public works program. Between 1865 and 1890 the Colonial Architects Office was responsible for the building and maintenance of 169 Post Offices and telegraph offices in NSW. The post offices constructed during this period featured in a variety of architectural styles, as Barnet argued that the local parliamentary representatives always preferred "different patterns".

The construction of new post offices continued throughout the 1890s depression years under the leadership of Walter Liberty Vernon, who held office from 1890 to 1911. While twenty-seven post offices were built between 1892 and 1895, funding to the Government Architect's Office was cut from 1893 to 1895, causing Vernon to postpone a number of projects.

Following Federation in 1901, the Commonwealth Government took over responsibility for post, telegraph and telephone offices, with the Department of Home Affairs Works Division being made responsible for post office construction. In 1916 construction was transferred to the Department of Works & Railways, with the Department of the Interior responsible during World War II.

On 22 December 1975, the Postmaster General's Department was abolished and replaced by the Postal & Telecommunications Department. This saw the foundation of Australia Post and Telecom. In 1989, the Australian Postal Corporation Act established Australia Post as a self-funding entity, heralding a new direction in property management, including a move away from the larger more traditional buildings towards smaller shop front style post offices.

For much of its history, the post office has been responsible for a wide variety of community services including mail distribution, an agency for the Commonwealth Bank, electoral enrolments, and the provision of telegraph and telephone services. The town post office has served as a focal point for the community, most often built in a prominent position in the centre of town close to other public buildings, creating a nucleus of civic buildings and community pride.

=== Junee Post Office ===
On 20 January 1862, the residents of Junee (now Old Junee) petitioned the Postmaster General to have a post office established there. Junee was the largest town in the district known collectively as The Levels, and its central position in the district aided in its choice as the post office site. The petition was successful with a post office established at Junee on 1 May 1862 in the store of Edward Smith, who was also appointed postmaster on a salary of £12 per annum. The post office continued to operate from Smith's store until November 1867 when it moved to Mrs Dacey's Inn. The operation of the post office from the business premises of the postmaster or postmistress was common practice prior to the restructuring of the Postal Service into a professional government agency in 1862. Junee continued this tradition due to the town's small size in the 1860s, which did not justify the construction of a separate office at this time.

In May 1878, in anticipation of the opening of the new railway (Main Southern railway line) linking Sydney to Junee (opened 6 June 1878), the residents of Junee, Boree and Wantabadgery requested that a new office be opened at Junee railway station. A receiving station was subsequently opened at the station on 12 June 1878 in George Dobbyns' store near the station, just six days after the opening of the railway. Dobbyns also had the contract to transport the mail between the station and the Junee township for £25 per annum until November when it was transferred to Denis Kaveneh. In November a petition was forwarded requesting that money order facilities be provided at the Railway Station Post Office, as they were from 5 May 1879.

In July 1881 Junee Railway Station Post Office was renamed Junee Junction Post Office, with a branch of the Government Savings Bank opened there on 1 July 1882. The "junction" referred to the junction of the south western railway and the main southern railway around which a small township had developed.

In March 1883 a portable wooden building was purchased for £135 to be used as a temporary telegraph office at Junee Junction. The telegraph had operated in Junee since 1878 with Francis Turner as the telegraph master at Junee. The new "American Cottage" style telegraph office was converted in August 1883 to serve as the post office as well. The local residents petitioned for the postmaster, Mr Mann, to be retained as Postmaster after the move, which he was in the position of Temporary Postmaster. The staff at Junee Junction consisted of Mann on £104 plus £12 porterage allowance per annum, a telegraph master on £104 and a messenger on £26 per annum.

Later, in 1883, Junee Junction became an official post office with Mr Mann as the first official postmaster. An assistant, A. Henriques, joined Mann in October 1884, after requesting help to cope with the increasing business at Junee Junction. Mann reported that the population of Junee Junction, taking in the three settlements of Crawlys Town, Dobbyns Town and Loftus, was 1100 adults.

In September 1884 the Junee Junction Progress Committee recommended that a post and telegraph office be erected on land adjoining the railway station.

As Junee Junction grew, the residents of old Junee began to call for the name to be changed. In June 1886 Mr S Storey, a storekeeper from Junee, complained that it was a great nuisance to have the Junction called by the same name as the town that had been in existence since the 1850s. A report noted that at this time the Junction had a population of 2000, while old Junee had approximately 100 people.

With the growing population, pressure to build the new post office increased and in 1886 the PMG approved construction of the new building. A site was purchased from the Railway Department for £700 on Lorne Street. The block had a frontage of seventy five feet to Lorne street and was 100 feet deep. The Colonial Architect, James Barnet, forwarded the plans for the post office to the Works Department on 11 January 1887. As the building was to be attached to a railway premises, the Railway Department took charge of the construction and advised the cost would be approximately £1200.

The tender for the construction was given out to Messrs Gatby and Flock by the railway department for £1304.18.6, with construction completed and the building occupied by 11 July 1888. In August 1888 it was again suggested that the name of the post office be changed, this time to Junee which was the Borough name. However, the Department of Railways objected and so no change was made.

In October 1891 a Postal Inspector visited Junee Junction Post and Telegraph Office reported that the hours of the telegraph operators were too long, as there was only two in the office. As Junee was an important telegraph junction and relay station for messages the two operators often worked from 7.30am until 8.15pm, while taking turns working on Sunday. In contrast, the post office work was fairly distributed between the postmaster and his operators.

From November 1893, following representations from the Junee Municipal Council, the name of the Junee Junction Post Office was officially changed to Junee. During the same year repairs were carried out costing £124. Further repairs and alterations were carried out on the building in 1897 by DH Taunton for £773.17, finished in 1898. This work included the enlargement of the public lobby with a new twelve foot long counter opposite the entrance. The lobby was divided with the postal department on one side and the telegraph department on the other. In December 1898 the Department of Works decided to erect a balcony the full length of the Post Office instead of a verandah along half of it as had been originally contemplated.

In June 1899 a proposal for the erection of a clock at the office was discussed. Initially it was suggested that the clock could be placed in the fanlight of the office, but this was rejected on the basis that the position would block airflow to the office. It was decided that instead the clock would be erected on the verandah to the left of the entrance.

Repairs to the ceiling of the old portion of the post office were carried out on 18 July 1899. D. H. Taunton was again employed to replace the old ceiling, part of which had fallen in, with boards, and to reinstate the counter, glass screens and folding doors.

A single-storey addition to the northern side of the post office was constructed in c. 1909, with the front awning extended along the full length of the building at the same time. Further alterations were made to the office in 1927 by A. S. Fairweather.

The first-floor balcony was removed and the French doors replaced with double hung sash windows during the 1960s. The post office was repainted in the early 1990s, and the interior retail area was changed at around the same time.

== Description ==
The Junee Post Office is a prominent two-storey painted brick building (excepting the face brick rear wall), constructed in the Victorian Regency Style and built in 1888. It has a predominantly hipped, corrugated iron roof and there is a parapeted gable end to the single-storey northern addition. The roof is punctuated by a total of five chimneys with rendered and ornately moulded tops on face brick bodies, four located on the two-storey section and one on the single-storey section. The outbuildings feature skillion roofs.

Several documented additions have occurred to Junee Post Office since first construction. These include the extension of the northern side of the two storey-section in c. 1897-9, the addition of the verandah and a first floor balcony at about the same time, the extension of the verandah with the single storey addition to the north c. 1909 and the removal of the balcony c. 1960.

The eastern facade has an unusually wide, pavement-width verandah on the ground floor which has a low pitched roof clad in corrugated iron with a heavy, dentilled entablature, supported by paired, green painted cast iron posts. The pavement is a combination of bitumen and brick pavers and the soffit is green painted corrugated iron with an ovolo cornice, exposed beams and attached fluorescent lighting.

Junee Post Office is a cream painted brick building of various different types of brickwork, including English bond on the northern facade, Flemish bond on the eastern facade and Colonial bond on the southern facade. Posts, soffit and window sills are detailed in dark green, with cream painted window frames. It is a simply detailed building overall, with bracketed window sills and bracketed eaves. The most elaborate items noted are the elaborately moulded chimney tops.

The interior ground floor of Junee Post Office comprises four main areas. These include: the residence at the rear, containing vinyl tiled kitchen, tiled laundry, carpeted lounge and pantry; the carpeted retail area at the northern end; the vinyl sheet mail room at the southern side; and staff amenities at the centre rear.

Ceilings of the ground floor are varied. The retail area, kitchen and laundry have board and batten ceilings with a moulded cornice. The pantry and rear entry porch have a boarded ceiling, the mail room and north western store room have plaster ceilings with a wide moulded cornice and the kitchen has a plasterboard ceiling. The residence stair hall retains a plaster ceiling with an ornate moulded cornice. The ground floor has suspended and attached fluorescent lighting and some ceiling fans.

The architraves of the ground floor appear to be original or early with some modifications. There is original skirting in the stair hall and lounge, with a later, plain picture rail in the lounge and cut render dado line in the kitchen. Modern skirting and details are part of the standard Australia Post fitout of the mail room and retail area.

There are predominantly single pane upper and lower sash windows, with some internal glazing within partitions. Internal doors are four panel within the residence and later modern flush doors in the Post Office section and modern front door. There are fanlights over some internal doorways.

Walls to the ground floor are rendered and painted brick in a grey colour scheme in the retail area and cream scheme to the remainder. There is a standard c. 1990 Australia Post fitout of the retail area, including partition walls enclosing the office and storage space of the retail area. The five fireplaces of the ground floor have been bricked in and gas taps have been installed, with a single marble surround retained in the lounge room.

The main stair appears to be original, with polished and painted, turned timber posts and balusters. The stair is fully carpeted, with carved timber brackets and original skirting that has been painted white.

The first floor comprises the residence bedrooms and lounge room, fully carpeted excepting the tiled bathroom and toilet in the north western corner.

Ceilings of the first floor include square set plaster in the western bedroom with a moulded ceiling rose, pressed metal in the lounge room, stair hall and landing, board and batten in the eastern bedroom and boarded ceilings in the hall, bathroom and toilet. The first floor has predominantly attached fluorescent lighting. Architraves on the first floor appear to be original, with simple picture rails in the corner lounge room, western and eastern bedrooms. There is original or early skirting on this level, excepting the bathroom and toilet additions.

Windows are predominantly early, single pane upper and lower sash windows, with original or early four panel doors with fanlights, and modern flush doors to the bathroom and toilet.

Walls on the first floor are rendered and painted brick, in a cream colour scheme with plasterboard or masonite partitions in the bathroom and toilet and later board and batten wall between the eastern bedroom and hall. The two fireplaces of the first floor have been boarded over and the surrounds have been retained.

Signage of Junee Post Office is limited to the lettering "Junee Post Office" centred on the eastern face of the awning entablature, and a standard Australia Post sign below the entablature of the northern end of the verandah.

Junee Post Office is located on the main street of historic Junee in a prominent position opposite a major intersection. It is surrounded by predominantly single to two-storey, late nineteenth to mid-twentieth century retail and commercial buildings, with a Victorian cottage to the south of the building. There are mature trees within the rear yard of the building and there is a bitumen carpark to the west of the site, servicing the nearby historic railway station and associated buildings.

There are several outbuildings within the site area. These include the most recent weatherboard and fibre-cement sheet shed in the south west corner of the site and early weatherboard shed to the west of the laundry, both in fair condition. There is an intrusive modern, white painted brick telephone booth shelter to the north of the Post Office, in front of the intrusive Telstra building. There is also a face brick pre-1917 store and former mechanics room to the north west of the site in good condition.

The condition of the post office was reported as good as at 5 July 2000, with the archaeological potential of the site is regarded as high.

As there have been a series of additions and alterations to Junee Post Office, the remaining original interior fabric on the ground floor has been altered substantially. The exterior has also undergone a series of changes over time. However, Junee Post Office retains the features which make it culturally significant, including architectural details such as the wide ground floor verandah and the hipped corrugated iron roof, as well as its overall form and style.

=== Modifications and dates ===
The original Junee Post Office building was completed in July 1888, comprising a simple two-storey face brick building with a hipped roof and classically-styled entrance.

In 1893 unspecified repairs were completed.

During 1897–99, alterations and repairs were carried out. These included the enlargement of the public lobby, the installation of a twelve-foot counter, new glass screens and folding doors, front awning and balcony construction, installation of the clock below the awning to the left of the entrance and the ceiling of the old Post Office portion was removed and boarded. This is probably when the two-storey section of the building was extended to the north, if not earlier. The date of this addition has been determined from early photos and plans, where the original form of the building is the southern side and its two front chimneys can still be clearly seen. (See Images 7, 8 & 11.)

The single-storey addition to the northern side was constructed and the front awning was extended to the full length of the building, c. 1909.

During 1927, unspecified alterations were carried out.

Removal of the first floor balcony occurred c. 1960, which saw the replacement of the French doors with double hung sash windows.

Repainting occurred c. 1992 by Australia Post in sympathetic colours, and at about the same time, the standard Australia Post retail fitout occurred.

== Heritage listing ==
Junee Post Office is significant at a State level for its historical associations, aesthetic qualities and social meaning. Junee Post Office reflects the development of the town and its increasing prosperity during the late nineteenth century as it evolved into a major rail centre in the region. It is also associated with the development of Junee Junction, as it is linked with the earlier post office established at the railway station in 1878. Junee Post Office was an important telegraph junction and relay station for the surrounding district, and provides evidence of the changing nature of postal and telecommunications practices in NSW. Junee Post Office has also been the centre of communications for Junee and the local area for over a century. Junee Post Office is aesthetically significant as it is a good example of the Victorian Regency style, with Federation period additions, and makes an important aesthetic contribution to the civic precinct of Junee. Junee Post Office is also associated with the Colonial Architect's Office under James Barnet and the NSW Government Architect's Office under W.L Vernon. Junee Post Office is also considered to be significant to the community of Junee's sense of place.

Junee Post Office was listed on the New South Wales State Heritage Register on 22 December 2000 having satisfied the following criteria.

The place is important in demonstrating the course, or pattern, of cultural or natural history in New South Wales.

Junee Post Office reflects the development of the town and its increasing prosperity during the late nineteenth century as it evolved into a major rail centre in the region. Junee Post Office is associated with the development of Junee Junction, as it is linked with the post office established at the railway station in 1878. Junee Post Office was an important telegraph junction and relay station for the surrounding district, and provides evidence of the changing nature of postal and telecommunications practices in NSW. Junee Post Office has been the centre of communications for Junee and the local area for over a century.

Junee Post Office is historically significant because it is associated with the Colonial Architect's Office under James Barnet. The 1909 additions were designed by the NSW Government Architect's Office under W.L Vernon.

The place is important in demonstrating aesthetic characteristics and/or a high degree of creative or technical achievement in New South Wales.

Junee Post Office is a clear example of the Victorian Regency style of architecture, with Federation period additions. It is considered to be a prominent and intact historic building post office with strong aesthetic value.

Junee Post Office also makes a valuable contribution to the late nineteenth century character of the civic precinct of Junee, which includes a number of Victorian period buildings and the railway station. These qualities make it a landmark in the civic precinct of Junee.

The place has strong or special association with a particular community or cultural group in New South Wales for social, cultural or spiritual reasons.

Junee Post Office is considered to be significant to the community's sense of place because it is a local landmark; it is the historic centre of communications for the town; and there is a history of community involvement in the establishment and development of the building since the late nineteenth century.

The place has potential to yield information that will contribute to an understanding of the cultural or natural history of New South Wales.

The archaeological potential of the site is considered to be high, due to the open nature of the rear and side of the building to show early structures or previous uses of the site.

The place possesses uncommon, rare or endangered aspects of the cultural or natural history of New South Wales.

Junee Post Office is not assessed as being rare.

The place is important in demonstrating the principal characteristics of a class of cultural or natural places/environments in New South Wales.

Junee Post Office is a good example of the Victorian Regency style of architecture. It is part of the group of nineteenth-century post offices in NSW designed by the Colonial Architect's Office under James Barnet, which designed and maintained a number of post offices across NSW between 1865 and 1890.
