= Toorak Manor, Melbourne =

Historic mansion in Melbourne, Australia

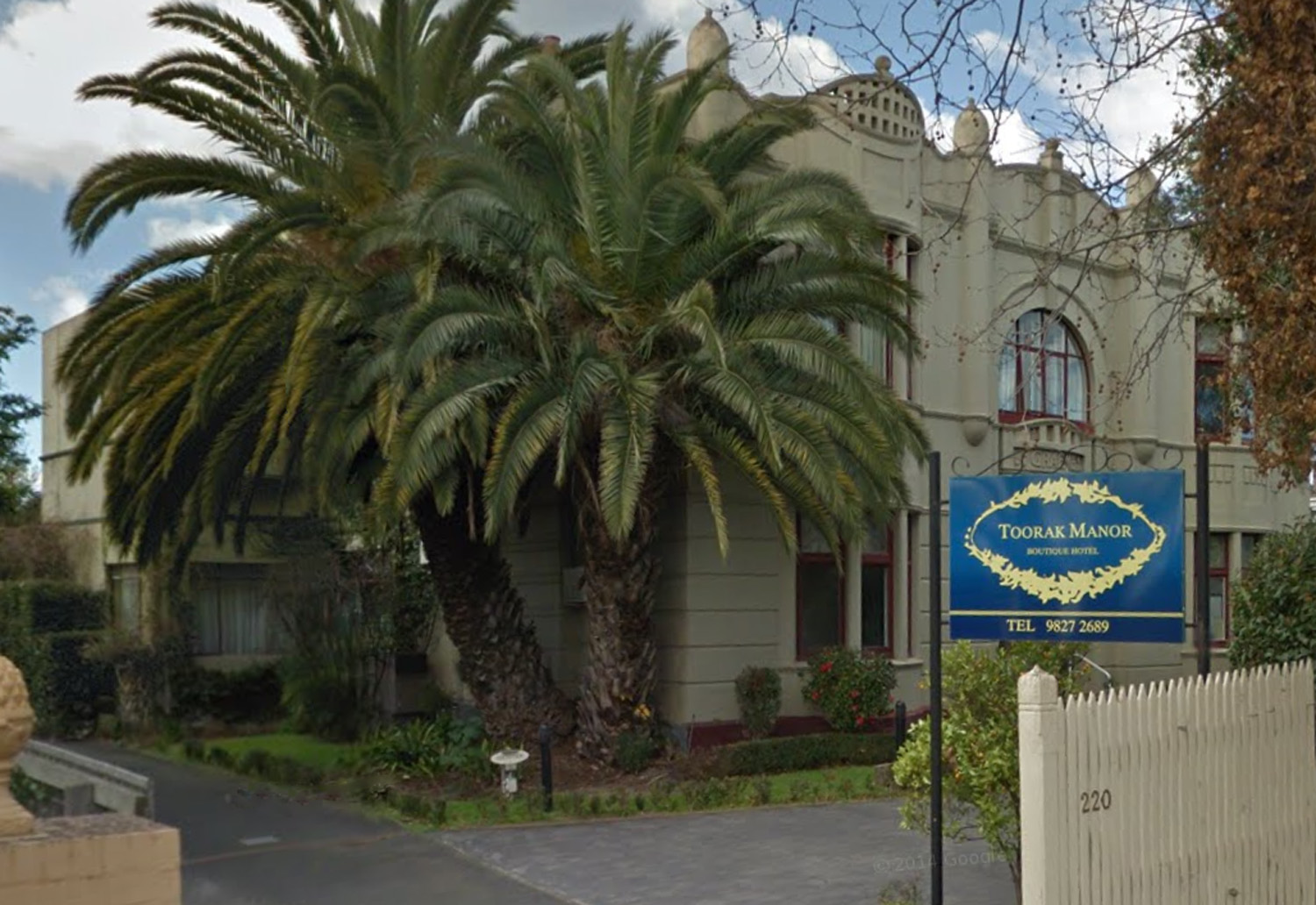
Toorak Manor, Melbourne

Toorak Manor, previously called “Graeme”, in Williams Rd Toorak is a house of historical significance. It is a Victorian mansion built in the 1880s for Dr Frank Nyulasy, a prominent physician and surgeon of Melbourne. It was part of the Tashinny Estate owned by Charles Alexander Smyth who sold part of his property in 1885. It is now a boutique hotel providing comfortable accommodation facilities.

== Dr Frank Nyulasy ==
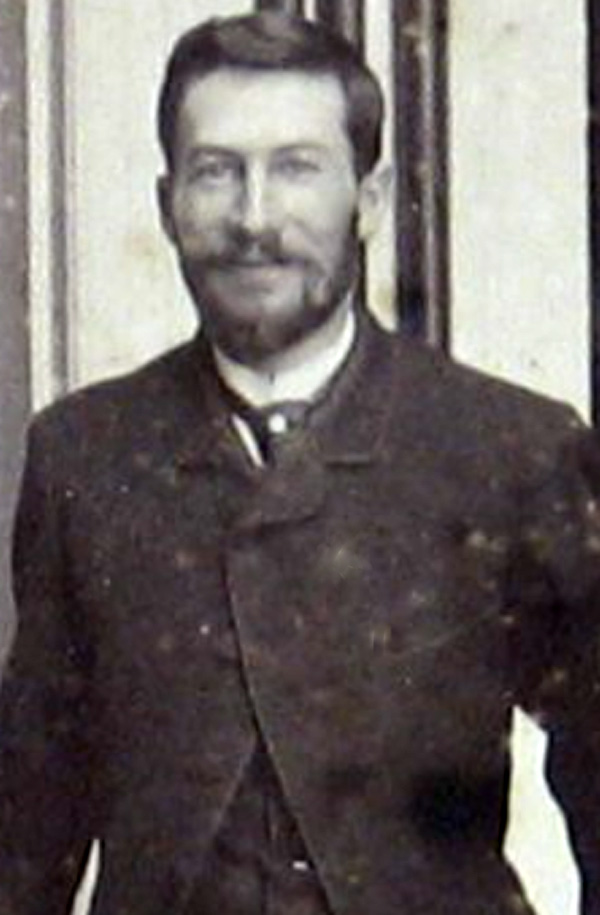
Dr. Frank Nyulasy in 1886.

Frank Nyulasy was born in Ballarat in 1862. His father was Charles Nyulasy, a Hungarian nobleman who had immigrated to Australia after the revolution. He eventually came to Ballarat where he married an Irish girl called Sarah Browne. Charles placed great importance on the education of his children so Frank was sent to Melbourne Grammar School and then after went to Melbourne University to undertake a medical degree. His sister Laura went to Holstein House Ladies College in South Yarra which was a fashionable school for girls at this time.

Frank graduated as a doctor in 1886 and shortly after built Toorak Manor. There is a family notice in an 1889 newspaper which shows that he was in residence there by this time. He lived in the house with his two sisters Laura and Marguerite for many years. During this time the family held numerous social events at their home which were frequently mentioned in the Melbourne newspapers. For example, one of their house parties was described as follows.

"Very pleasurable was the afternoon party given by Miss Nyulasy on Thursday at her residence “Graeme”, Toorak. In contrast to the oppressive heat out of doors, the reception room was delightfully cool and shortly after the company had assembled refreshing ices were handed around. The hostess wore a modish frock of white Brussels net fashioned to give the long waisted swathed effect.

Strawberries and other dainties were served in the dining room where the decorations were carried out with white marguerites, watsonias, irises, and lily of the valley arranged with pink fairy roses and feathery ferns in rustic baskets and a tiered centrepiece."

Frank was a prominent physician and served on many medical Committees. He was President of the Royal Victorian Institute for the Blind and in 1923 was elected as Fellow of the Royal Society of Medicine in England which was a great honour. He was also interested in literature and gave numerous talks on the works of Shakespeare, Tennyson and Dickens.

He died in 1934 at the age of 68 and his two sisters continued to live at the house until 1938 when they sold the property.

== The house today ==
“Graeme” (now Toorak Manor) is a comfortable hotel today which provides accommodation. It is located in the heart of Toorak and close to public transport.
