= Radio Home Visitor =

- Genre: News/talk
- Country of origin: United States
- Language(s): English
- Home station: 88.5 WRKC, King's College Radio
- Created by: Father Tom Carten
- Original release: September 2, 1974

The Radio Home Visitor is a radio program in Wilkes-Barre, Pennsylvania, broadcast by 88.5 WRKC, King's College Radio. It is a daily reading of Wyoming Valley newspapers and is constantly cited as one of the most listened-to news programs in the Wyoming Valley. RHV reaches the elderly, blind, and homebound population who otherwise wouldn't be able to read the paper. The program reaches 15,000 listeners daily. RHV has been on the air since 1974 and was created by a King's College alumnus and professor, the late Father Tom Carten.
