= 1RPH =

Radio reading service in Canberra, Australia

- Canberra, Australian Capital Territory; Australia
- Broadcast area: Canberra RA2 ()
- Frequency: AM: 1125 kHz Canberra

Programming
- Language: English
- Format: Radio reading service
- Affiliations: Radio Print Handicapped Network

Ownership
- Owner: Print Handicapped Radio of ACT, Inc.

History
- First air date: 5 October 1992
- Call sign meaning: Radio for the Print Handicapped, 1 for the Australian Capital Territory

Technical information
- Licensing authority: ACMA
- Power: 2,000 watts
- Transmitter coordinates: 35°12′52″S 149°7′0″E
- Translators: FM: 89.5 MHz Wagga Wagga; FM: 99.5 MHz Junee

Links
- Public licence information: Profile
- Website: Official website

Radio 1RPH 1125 kHz Canberra (89.5FM Wagga Wagga, 99.5FM Junee) is a volunteer-staffed AM band radio broadcast station in the Australian Capital Territory serving all of the ACT and surrounding areas of NSW including Queanbeyan, Yass and Michelago, with FM repeaters at Wagga and Junee, and a streaming media on its web site.

Radio 1RPH is a member of the Radio Print Handicapped Network. Its catch-phrases are, Your information station and Turning print into sound, and it is intended to serve all those who are, for any reason, handicapped from reading printed material.

Newspapers, magazines, books, and other printed material are read to air. 1RPH used to have a frequency just outside the AM band on 1620 kHz, and so suffered little interference, and was heard as far away as the United States.

== Equipment ==
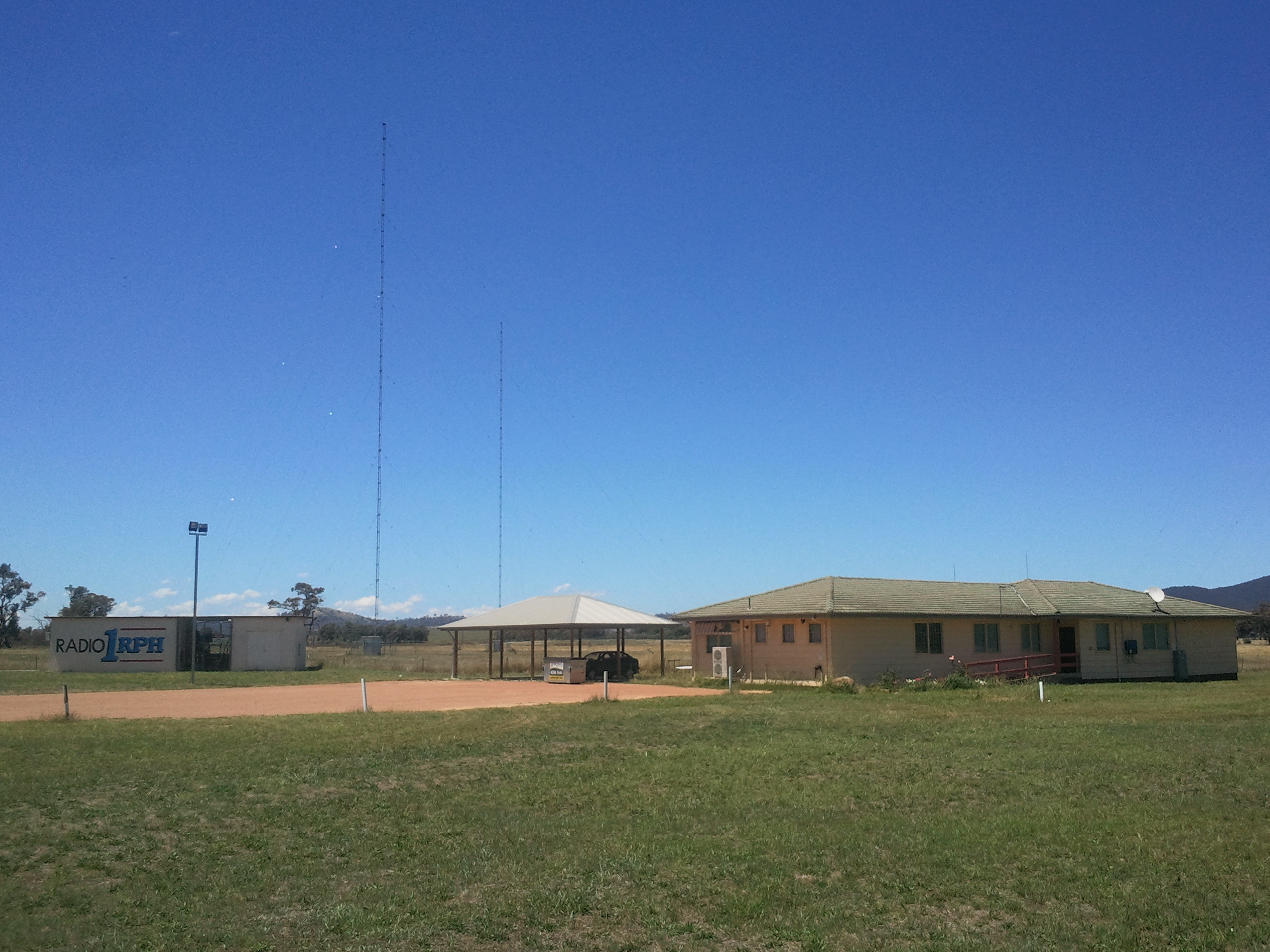
L–R: Transmitter building, dual masts, car park and carport, studio building.

=== Studios ===
==== On-air and production ====
- Two studios, each with 16 channel Ogenic broadcast mixers:
  - Audio channel sources:
    - computer
    - CD players
    - satellite channels
    - Tape-recorders
    - turntables
    - outside broadcast line
    - telephone-radio interface

==== Production ====
- digital post-production studio
- voice-only studio
- CD-R and tape library
- recorded music library

=== Transmitters and antennae ===
- 2,000 watt solid-state AM transmitter with standby
- two 65-metre (213 ft) antenna masts providing directional coverage
- emergency power-plant

== Effect of NDIS ==
In February 2016, the station management announced that it had been advised that $38,000 would not be available from the ACT Government's Disability ACT as of July 2016, when these funds would become part of the general National Disability Insurance Scheme (NDIS) funds administered by the Commonwealth Government. This amount represented roughly a quarter of the station's operating budget. Disability Minister Chris Bourke declined to promise funding from ACT resources, but said he would make enquiries of the Federal Minister for Disability. Leading the effort to publicise this funding shortfall were: President, Lorraine Litster; Vice President, and People With Disabilities ACT president, Robert Altamore; and volunteer broadcaster and ACT Legislative Assembly member, Vicki Dunne MLA. Litster pointed out that, of the $22 billion/year scheme, only $132 million has been set aside for services including the Radio Print Handicapped Network. The National Disability Insurance Authority (NDIA) has said it will be considering the matter.

== See also ==
- List of radio stations in Australia
- Radio Print Handicapped Network
