= WRKC =

Coordinates: 41.249°N 75.879°W

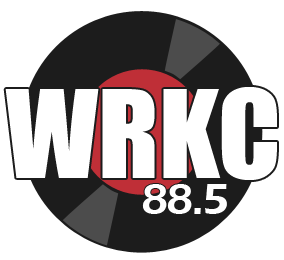
- United States
- Broadcast area: Wilkes-Barre, PA
- Frequency: 88.5 (MHz)
- Branding: "The Coolest Radio Station On The Planet"

Programming
- Format: Freeform

Ownership
- Owner: King's College

History
- First air date: September 18, 1968

Technical information
- Class: A
- ERP: 1500 watts

Links
- Website: WRKC web site

WRKC (88.5 FM) is a 1500-watt student-operated college radio station in Wilkes-Barre, Pennsylvania, in northeastern Pennsylvania. The station's signal is best heard within inner Luzerne County (Wilkes-Barre, Kingston, Swoyersville), but can also be received in outer Luzerne County (Pittston, Nanticoke, Dallas). WRKC broadcasts 24 hours a day, 365 days a year.

== Format ==
Like many college radio stations, WRKC is run completely by students at King's College, except for the general manager. The station's radio format has a fair mixture of contemporary rock, indie rock, punk rock and other assorted genres. Students must play at least 40% of their music from rotation, but sometimes this rule is voided if the genre of a show is unique (i.e., a reggae show would not require rotation to be played since there is very little reggae in rotation). In 2010, a completely student written and performed radio noir show began broadcasting on the station, making it one of the only non-music programs available on the station. WRKC was formerly a mixed news, talk and music station but in the last fifteen years went to a complete radio format, save for the aforementioned radio noir show and the station's anchor program, the Radio Home Visitor, a news program that has read the day's local newspapers to the blind since 1974. While a mixed radio format, the station aired some well-known segments such as a student interview with the Ku Klux Klan. The station is webcast. The station airs 24-hours a day on a 1500 watt signal, playing a jukebox of music when student DJs do not do shows. Earlier in its history, King's students hosted shows on the air 24 hours a day.

== WRKC's News at 5 ==
WRKC's News at 5 is a student-run and produced award-winning newscast that airs Mondays, Wednesdays, and Fridays at 5 p.m. while the college is in session. WRKC also broadcasts emergency alerts through an Emergency Alert System (EAS) and provides special coverage of breaking news events. The News at 5 is typically 15 minutes long and contains campus news, local news from the Wilkes-Barre area, a music segment, a politics or business segment, a sports segment, and important college announcements. The News at 5 is anchored live by student anchors.

=== Notable Interviews ===
- Senator Bernie Sanders and United States senatorial candidate for Pennsylvania Katie McGinty, Fall 2016
- Pennsylvania Attorney General Josh Shapiro, Fall 2016
- Pennsylvania 11th District Congressman Lou Barletta, Fall 2016
- Pennsylvania Governor Tom Wolfe, Spring 2017
- Victim's rights advocate and author Jennifer Storm, Fall 2016

== Student Staff ==
WRKC is run by an executive board of six students and a faculty general manager. The positions represent the most essential functions of the radio station that need to be overseen.

=== Station Manager ===
Station manager (SM) is the highest ranking student-held position for WRKC. The SM is responsible for overseeing every aspect of the day-to-day functions of WRKC, assists the general manager, and manages personnel. The station managers from 2015-current are listed below.

- 2015-2016 - Kris Atienza, Class of 2016
- 2016-2017 - Jessica Mulligan, Class of 2017
- 2017-2018 - Katherine Pugh, Class of 2020

=== Program Director ===
The program director (PD) is responsible for organizing and implementing the station's programming and maintaining and preparing FCC-required files. The program directors from 2015-current are listed below.

- 2015-2016 - Eryn Harvey, Class of 2016
- 2016-2017 - Nicholas Rotondo, Class of 2017
- 2017-2018 - John Flynn, Class of 2019

=== News Director ===
The news director (ND) produces, writes, and manages WRKC's newscast, WRKC's News at 5. This includes reporting campus and local news from the Wilkes-Barre area and coordinating reporters to gather material. The news directors from 2015-current are listed below.

- 2015-2016 - Nicholas Rotondo. Class of 2017
- 2016-2017 - Katherine Pugh, Class of 2020
- 2017-2018 - Maggie Bentkowski, Class of 2019

=== Music Director ===
The music director (MD) prepares all music programming for the PD and thus prepares the vast majority of WRKC's programming. The MD is also responsible for corresponding with music promoters and bands to obtain new music for broadcast. The music directors from 2015-current are listed below.

- 2015-2017 - Therese Roughsedge, Class of 2017
- 2017-2018 - Samuel Zavada, Class of 2019

=== Sports Director ===
The sports director (SD) contacts coaches and players of King's College sports teams to report sports updates on WRKC's News at 5. These updates can also include major news from professional sports teams. The SD also coordinates broadcasts of football and men's and women's basketball games. The sports directors from 2015-current are listed below.

- 2015-2016 - Daniel Lynch, Class of 2016
- 2016-2018 - Dan Stokes, Class of 2018

=== Social Media and Promotions Director ===
Social Media and Promotions Director (SMPD) is the newest position at WRKC and was created in the fall semester of 2016 to manage WRKC's growing social media presence on Facebook, Instagram, and Twitter. The SMPDs from 2016-current are listed below.

- 2016-2017 - John Flynn, Class of 2019
- 2017-2018 - Jamie Rosencrans, Class of 2019

== Awards and honors ==
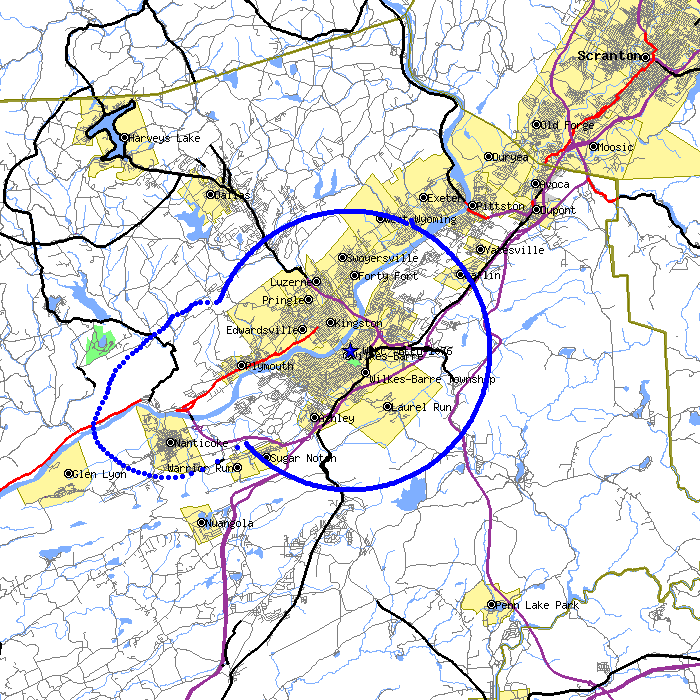
WRKC Contour Map [FCC file: FM292276]

WRKC holds the title of Northeastern Pennsylvania's most awarded college radio station. WRKC participates in award conferences including the Intercollegiate Broadcast System awards, the Society for Professional Journalist college radio awards, and local community polling. WRKC has received 57 awards and nominations.

=== 2017 Intercollegiate Broadcast System Awards ===
WRKC's staff and management received 5 Golden Microphone awards.

- Best College Radio Station Under 10,000 Students (Finalist)
- Best Spot News Coverage, News Director Katie Pugh, "Lou Barletta Election Night Victory" (Winner)
- Best Community Volunteer Program, WRKC staff, The Radio Home Visitor (Finalist)
- Best Talk Program, Program Director Nicholas Rotondo and Chistopher Natale, Geek Week with Chris and Nick "Episode 2" (Finalist)
- Most Innovative Program, Music Director Therese Roughsedge, Music Monday (Finalist)

== Bands ==
The general practice of WRKC, like many other college radio stations, is to play non-mainstream and underground bands. In recent years, bands like Fall Out Boy, Taking Back Sunday and My Chemical Romance were played heavily on WRKC before they achieved mainstream attention. Many popular bands in previous decades have been played on WRKC before they reached mainstream popularity.

== Sports ==
The station also airs broadcasts of football and men's and women's basketball games for the King's College Monarchs. The typical format of these broadcasts includes the Sports Director calling play-by-plays and a station staff member making color analysis.
