= Junee =

- Town
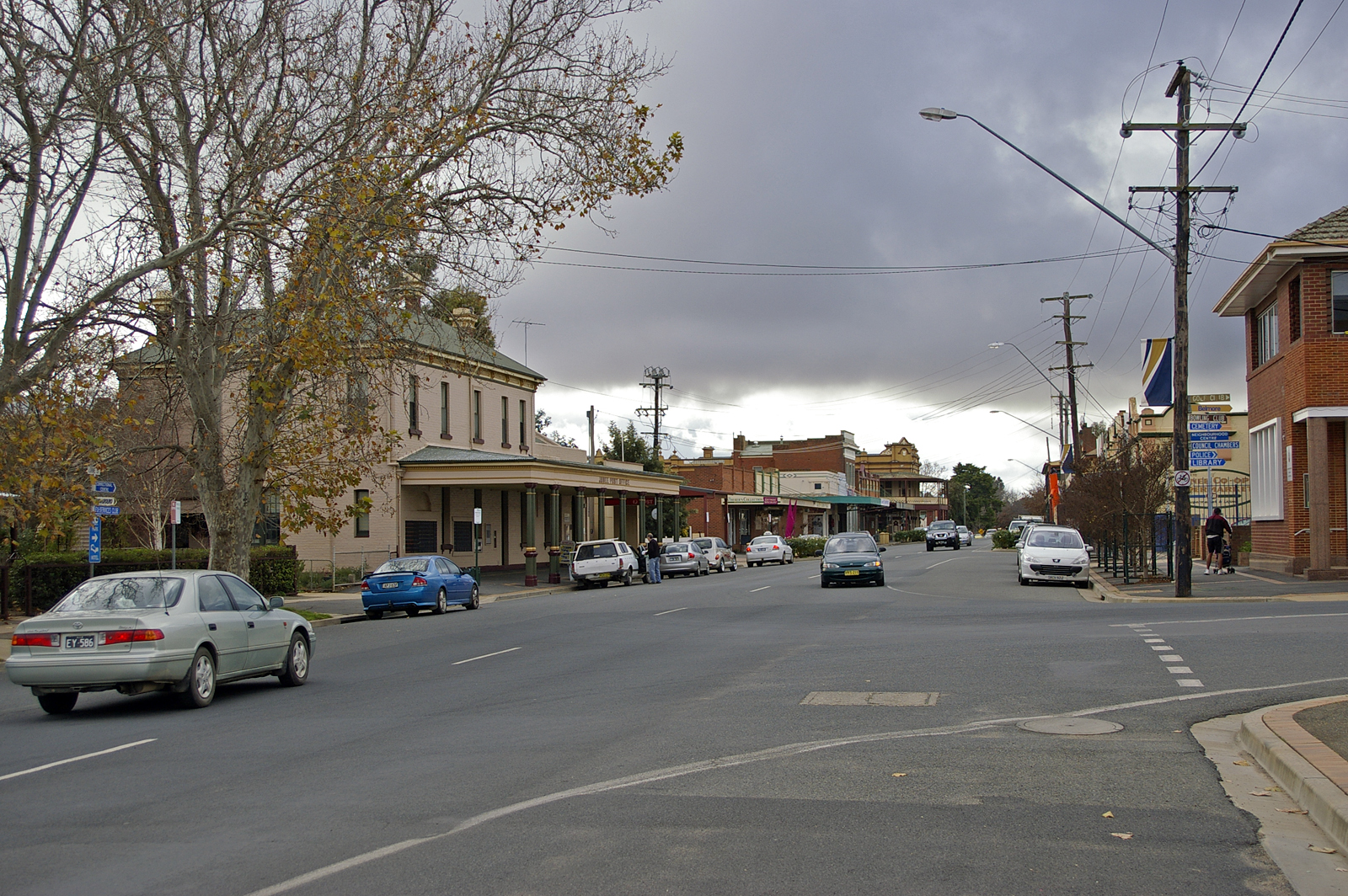
- Lorne Street

- Coordinates: 34°52′0″S 147°34′0″E
- Country: Australia
- State: New South Wales
- LGA: Junee Shire
- Location: 40 km (25 mi) from Wagga Wagga; 220 km (140 mi) from Canberra; 470 km (290 mi) from Sydney
- Established: Late 1870s

Government
  - State electorate: Cootamundra
  - Federal division: Riverina
- Elevation: 280 m (920 ft)

Population
  - Total: 4,882 (UCL 2021)
- Time zone: UTC+10 (AEST)
  - Summer (DST): UTC+11 (AEDT)
- Postcode: 2663
- County: Clarendon
- Mean max temp: 22.9 °C (73.2 °F)
- Mean min temp: 8.6 °C (47.5 °F)
- Annual rainfall: 530.6 mm (20.89 in)

Junee (/dʒuːˈniː/) is a medium-sized town in the Riverina region of New South Wales, Australia. The town's prosperity and mixed services economy is based on a combination of agriculture, rail transport, light industry and government services, and in particular correctional services. In 2021 Junee's urban population was 4,882.

== Place name ==
One theory is that word Junee which originates from the Aboriginal word 'Junee' means "speak to me". Another theory is that it is an Aboriginal word "Choo-nee" meaning "frog".

== History ==
The Wiradjuri people are the traditional owners of the local area prior to European settlement. Leopold de Salis (1816–1898), pastoralist and later politician was one of the first squatters to open up the Riverina region to grazing. He established the 'Junee' pastoral run in 1845. Leopold held the licence for this run for a total of three years. Other run licencees followed until Thomas Hammond and Richard Gwynne bought the licence in 1857. The Junee run progressively reduced in area as selectors took up land but Hammond lived on it until his death in 1899, the remaining property having been named "Wyoming" in 1887. A post office opened in 1862 and a village called 'Junee' was gazetted in 1863 on the wool road to Sydney. That same year, Ben Hall and his bushranging gang raided the village.

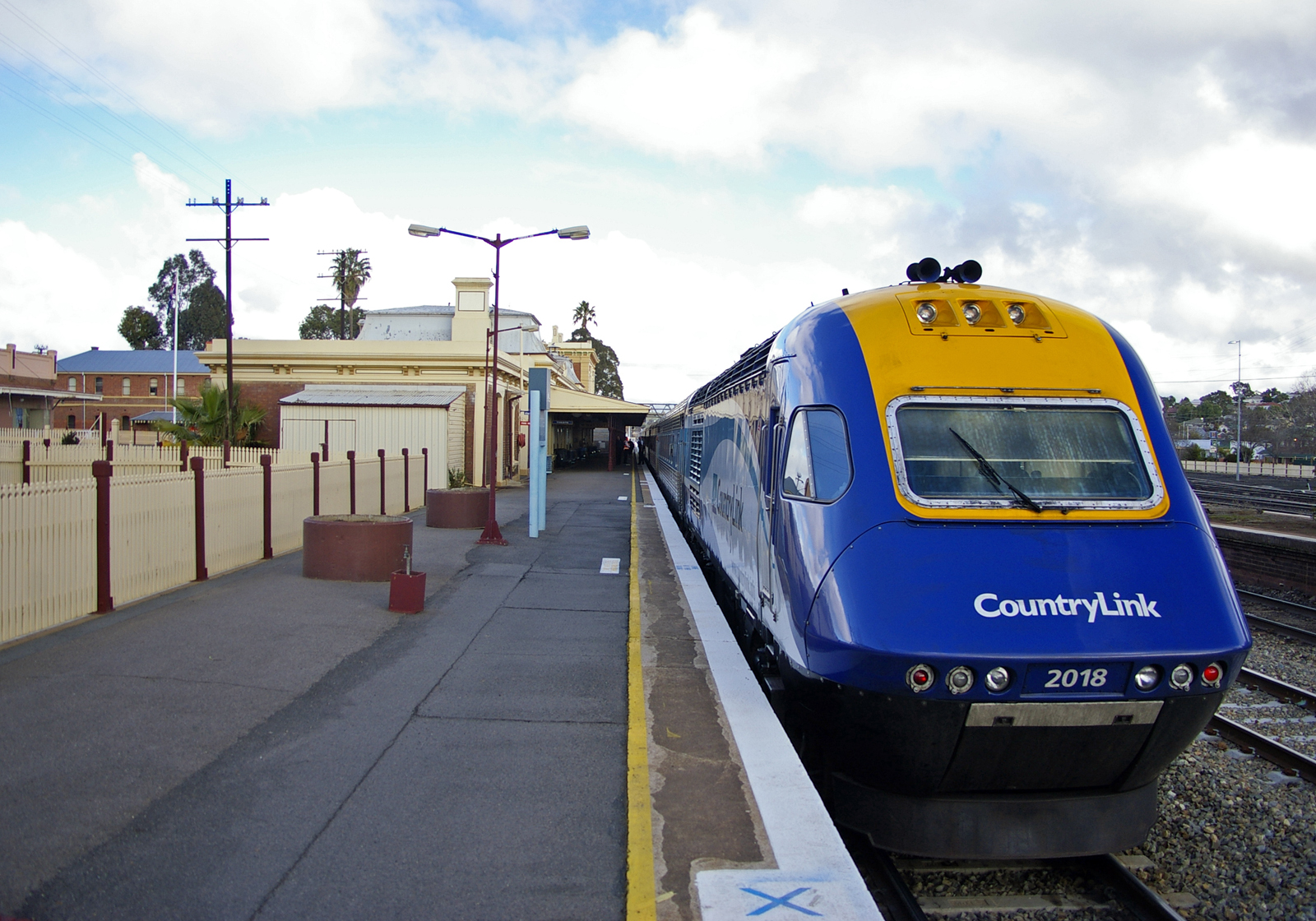
Junee railway station with a CountryLink XPT at the platform in 2009

In 1866 Junee's population was recorded as twelve but the discovery of reef and alluvial gold during the 1860s triggered a gold rush. The main sites- Junee Reefs (to the north), was mined on and off until after World War 1, as well as Wantiool and Eurongilly (to the east) until the 1880s.

By 1878 with the southward expansion of the Main South line in New South Wales, the main railway line between Sydney and Melbourne passed 8 kilometres east of the village. Junee's Post Office was renamed Old Junee in 1885 (Junee railway station). Loftus was the original name of the locality being farm land and as the settlers moved in for the rail line it was renamed. Junee Railway Station Post Office opened on 6 July 1878, was renamed Junee Junction in 1881 and later still, Junee in 1893.

=== Rail and road ===
The Main South railway line between Sydney and Melbourne runs through Junee, as does the Olympic Highway, named for the route of the 1956 Summer Olympics Torch Relay. The advent of rail transport in 1878 provided the impetus for an economic boom providing local agricultural producers with affordable direct access to markets in Sydney. In 1952 the largest wheat terminal in the Southern Hemisphere was constructed at Junee, adjacent to the South West Railway, providing both rail and road transport.

Rail transport makes an important contribution to the local economy with Regional Rail Logistics operating a containerised freight service that delivers various goods from Junee to Sydney, with interstate freight trains also passing through the town.

=== Local Government ===
On 1 January 1981, Junee Municipal Council amalgamated with the surrounding "Illabo Shire Council', creating Junee Shire Council.

== Climate ==
Junee has as a rather dry humid subtropical climate (Köppen Cfa), lying about 75 millimetres or 3 inches above semi-arid classification. It features hot and dry summers and cool, rather cloudy winters. The highest temperature recorded at Junee was 46.1 °C or 115.0 °F on 31 January 1968; the lowest recorded was −5.0 °C or 23.0 °F on 1 July 1971 and 6 August 1974. The average annual rainfall is 530.6 millimetres or 20.89 inches spread across 88 days (with the majority in winter). It can snow on rare occasions, with the last snowfall in August 2019.

Climate data for Junee Treatment Works (1907–1975, rainfall 1891–2022); 280 metres (919 ft) AMSL; 34.85° S, 147.57° E
| Month | Jan | Feb | Mar | Apr | May | Jun | Jul | Aug | Sep | Oct | Nov | Dec | Year |
|---|---|---|---|---|---|---|---|---|---|---|---|---|---|
| Record high °C (°F) | 46.1 (115.0) | 44.4 (111.9) | 40.6 (105.1) | 32.8 (91.0) | 25.6 (78.1) | 21.6 (70.9) | 23.0 (73.4) | 26.1 (79.0) | 33.3 (91.9) | 35.0 (95.0) | 38.3 (100.9) | 40.6 (105.1) | 46.1 (115.0) |
| Mean daily maximum °C (°F) | 32.4 (90.3) | 31.6 (88.9) | 28.4 (83.1) | 22.8 (73.0) | 17.9 (64.2) | 13.9 (57.0) | 13.2 (55.8) | 15.1 (59.2) | 18.9 (66.0) | 22.7 (72.9) | 27.0 (80.6) | 30.8 (87.4) | 22.9 (73.2) |
| Mean daily minimum °C (°F) | 15.5 (59.9) | 15.6 (60.1) | 12.9 (55.2) | 8.6 (47.5) | 5.5 (41.9) | 3.3 (37.9) | 2.3 (36.1) | 3.2 (37.8) | 5.0 (41.0) | 7.4 (45.3) | 10.2 (50.4) | 13.5 (56.3) | 8.6 (47.4) |
| Record low °C (°F) | 5.6 (42.1) | 7.0 (44.6) | 3.9 (39.0) | 0.6 (33.1) | −2.8 (27.0) | −4.0 (24.8) | −5.0 (23.0) | −5.0 (23.0) | −3.3 (26.1) | −2.8 (27.0) | 1.7 (35.1) | 3.8 (38.8) | −5.0 (23.0) |
| Average precipitation mm (inches) | 40.8 (1.61) | 37.2 (1.46) | 40.9 (1.61) | 40.6 (1.60) | 42.9 (1.69) | 49.8 (1.96) | 47.0 (1.85) | 46.8 (1.84) | 44.2 (1.74) | 50.9 (2.00) | 44.7 (1.76) | 41.4 (1.63) | 530.6 (20.89) |
| Average precipitation days (≥ 0.2 mm) | 4.9 | 4.6 | 4.5 | 5.5 | 7.8 | 9.5 | 11.2 | 11.0 | 8.8 | 8.2 | 6.3 | 5.4 | 87.7 |
Source: Bureau of Meteorology (1891–2022)

== Heritage listings ==
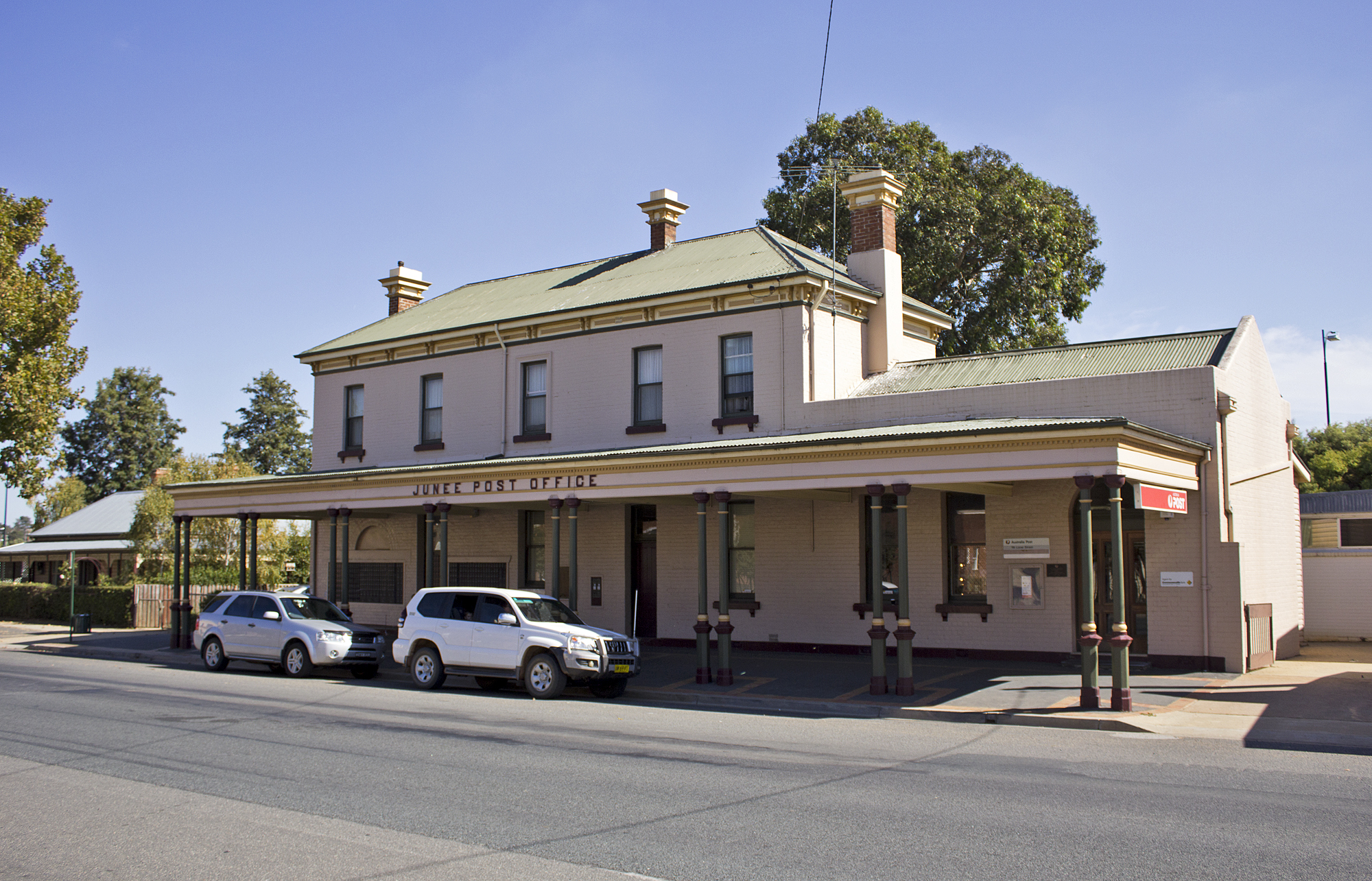
Junee Post Office, Lorne Street

Junee has a number of heritage-listed sites, including:

- 119 Lorne Street: Junee Post Office
- Main Southern railway: Junee railway station
- The Broadway: Athenium Theatre

== Other attractions ==
- Statue of rugby league commentator Ray Warren at Dobbyn Park, erected 6 August 2011
- Monte Cristo Homestead, for many years owned by the Ryan family, who did much restoration work.
- Junee Licorice Factory and restaurant, confectionery manufacturer and tourism drawcard.

== Demographics ==
According to the 2021 census, there were 4,882 people in Junee.

- Aboriginal and Torres Strait Islander people made up 9.4% of the population.
- 81.5% of people were born in Australia; the next most common countries of birth included China (excluding Special Administrative Regions (SARs) and Taiwan) 1.9%, England 1.3%, New Zealand 1.0%, Fiji 0.8%, and Malaysia 0.8%. 70.9% of people spoke only English at home; the next most common languages spoken at home included Mandarin 2.1%, Fijian 0.7%, Malay 0.6%, Chinese, not further defined 0.3%, and Cantonese 0.2%.
- 25.2% of respondents in this area identified a religious connection with Catholicism, followed by No Religion at 23.8%, Anglican at 17.4%, and Prebysterian and Reformed 2.6%; a further 22.3% of respondents for this area elected not to disclose their religious status.

Historical population
| Year | Pop. | ±% |
|---|---|---|
| 1921 | 3,560 | — |
| 1933 | 4,213 | +18.3% |
| 1947 | 4,010 | −4.8% |
| 1954 | 4,064 | +1.3% |
| 1961 | 3,980 | −2.1% |
| 1966 | 3,906 | −1.9% |
| 1971 | 3,772 | −3.4% |
| 1976 | 4,005 | +6.2% |
| 1981 | 3,993 | −0.3% |
| 1986 | 3,720 | −6.8% |
| 1991 | 3,673 | −1.3% |
| 1996 | 3,681 | +0.2% |
| 2001 | 3,589 | −2.5% |
| 2006 | 3,744 | +4.3% |
| 2011 | 4,400 | +17.5% |
| 2016 | 4,762 | +8.2% |
| 2021 | 4,882 | +2.5% |
Source: Australian Bureau of Statistics data.

== Sport ==
The most popular sport in Junee is rugby league. The town's team, the Junee Diesels, compete in the Group 9 Rugby League competition, in which they have won two premierships. The club is notable for having produced New South Wales and Australian captain Laurie Daley.

The town had now defunct Australian rules and rugby union teams, known as the Bulldogs and Rams.

== Notable people ==
- Laurie Daley, rugby league footballer and New South Wales and Australian captain
- Bernie Fraser, former governor of the Reserve Bank of Australia
- Bill Heffernan, former Senator for New South Wales, representing the Liberal Party
- Lawrence Legend, motorcycle stuntman
- Ray Warren, sports commentator known as 'The voice of rugby league'
- James Harrison, blood donor

== Communications ==
Junee is served by:

- Junee Independent newspaper
- Radio 1RPH transmitter (99.5FM)

== See also ==
- Jail Break Inn Fire

== Gallery ==
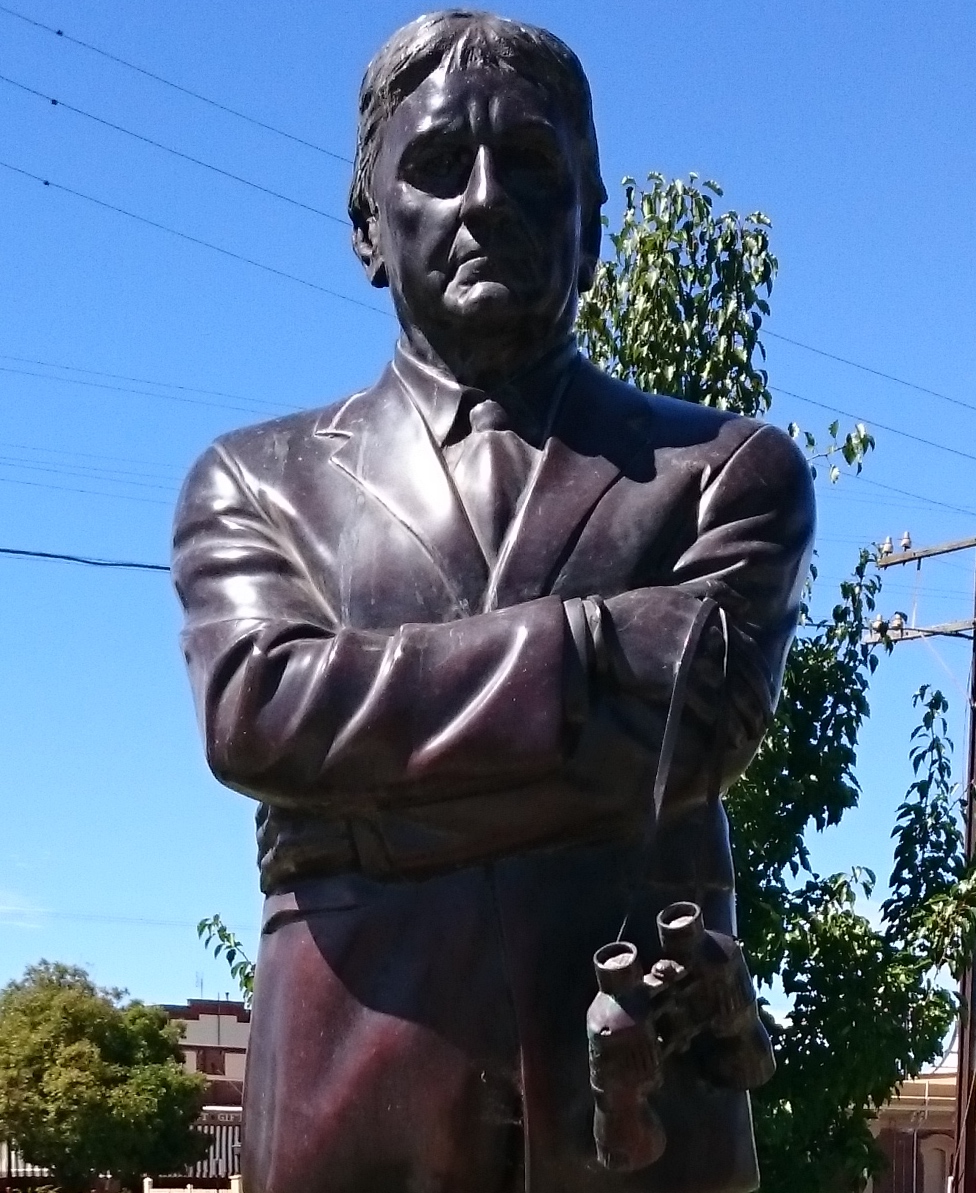
Ray Warren statue

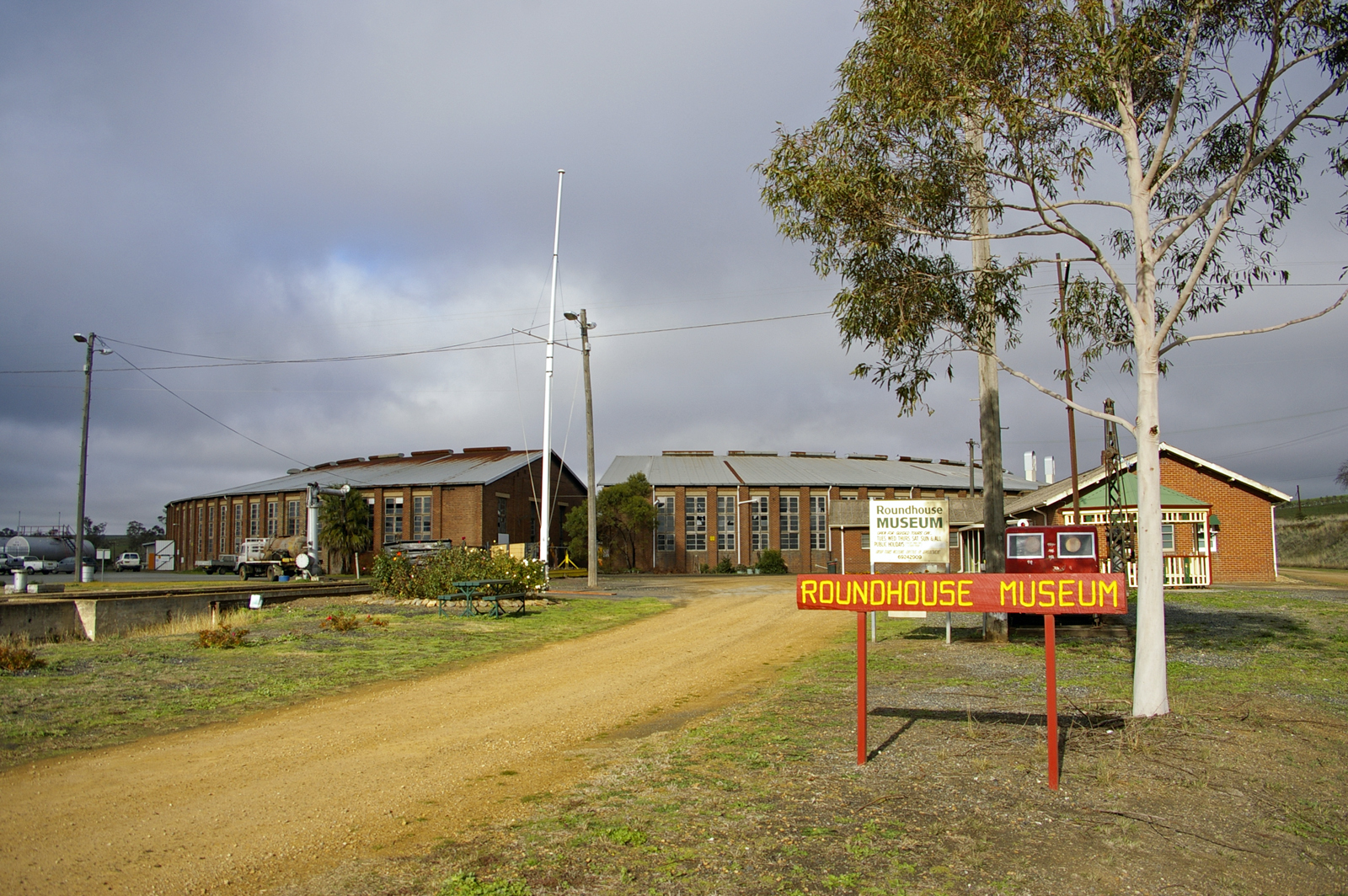
Roundhouse

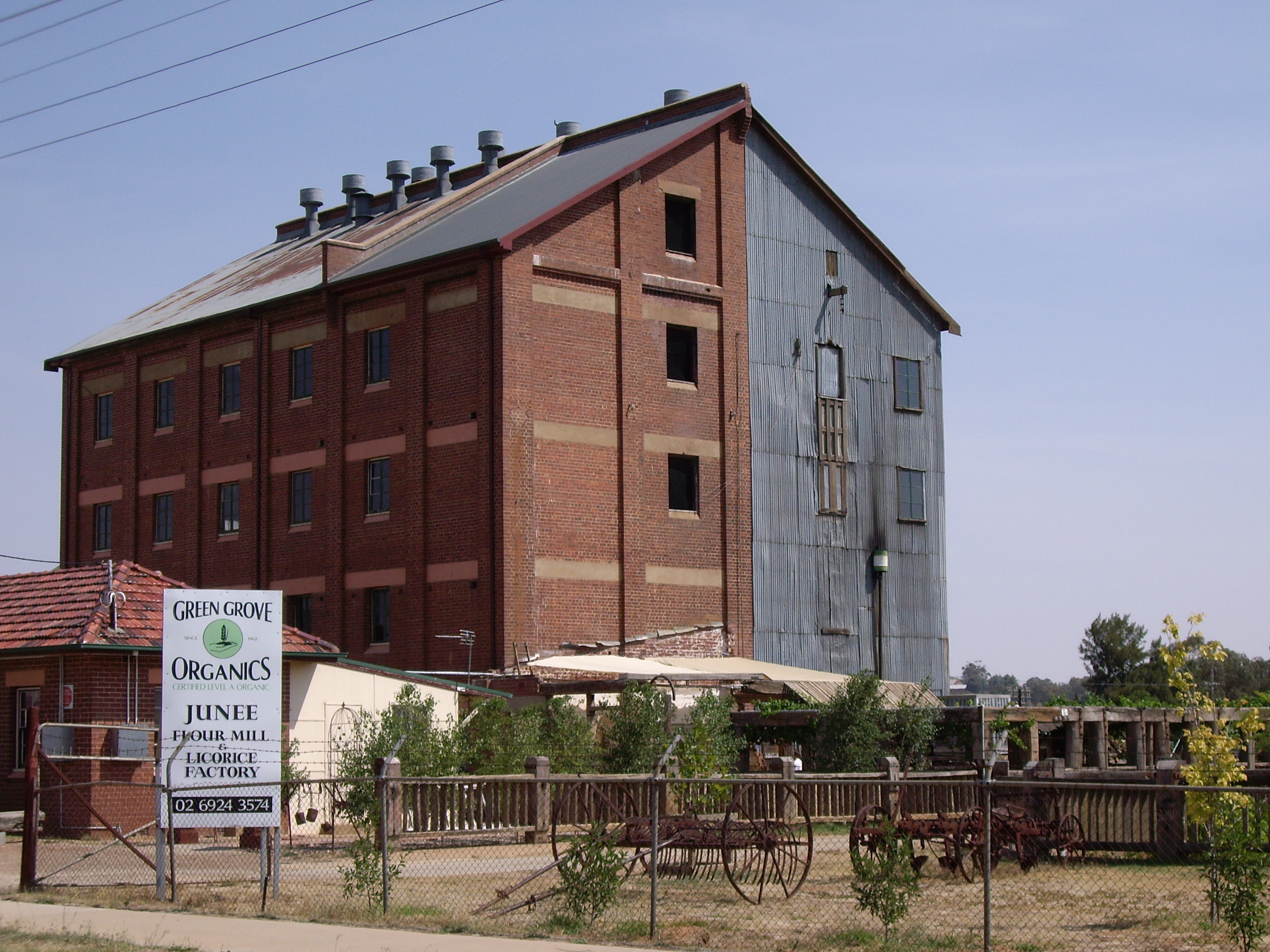
Licorice Factory

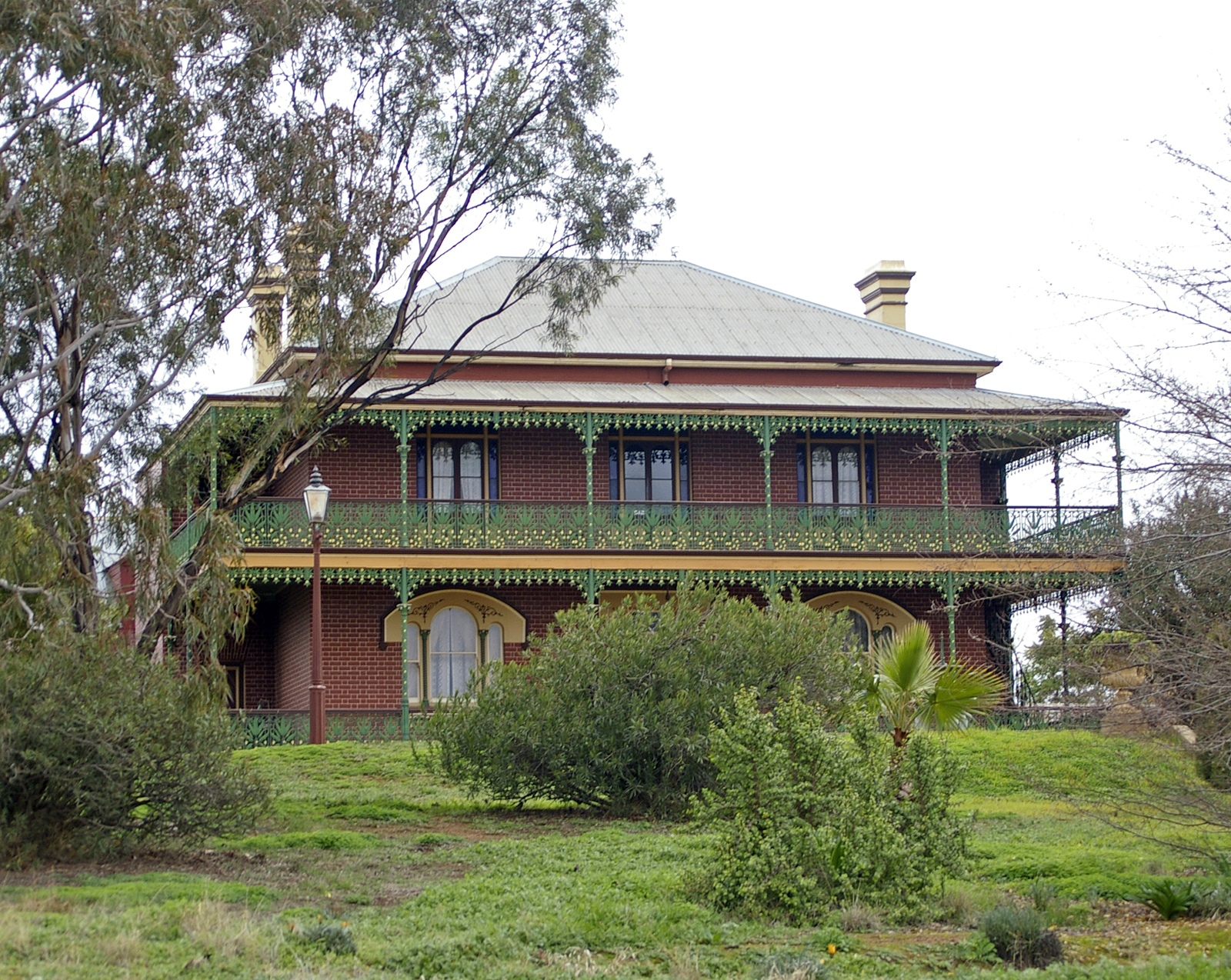
Monte Cristo
