= 6RPH =

Radio station in Perth, Western Australia

- Perth; Australia
- Broadcast area: Western Australia
- Frequency: 990 kHz AM
- Branding: Vision Australia Radio

Programming
- Format: Radio reading service
- Affiliations: Radio Print Handicapped Network

Ownership
- Owner: Vision Australia Radio

History
- Call sign meaning: 6 = Western Australia; Radio for the Print; Handicapped

Technical information
- Class: Community radio
- Power: 5 kW

Links
- Website: Official website

6RPH Vision Australia Radio broadcasts on 990 kHz AM and was previously owned and operated by the Foundation for Information Radio of Western Australia Inc. It now broadcasts Vision Australia Radio and aims to provide access to printed information for Western Australians with a print disability. Vision Australia Radio is a member of RPH Australia.

Its radio reading service is available on 990 AM throughout the wider Perth metropolitan area. However, in the early part of 2015 the station started to play a recorded music loop, together with a repeated announcement that its service had been suspended due to "technical issues". In March/early April 2015, 6RPH ceased broadcasting, but has since recommenced transmission with the Vision Australia Radio service on 990AM and on IRIS digital.

Radio 6PM occupied the 990 kHz frequency until the late 1980s.

== See also ==
- List of radio stations in Australia
- Radio Print Handicapped Network
