= 3RPH =

Vision Australia Radio (3RPH)
- Melbourne, Victoria; Australia
- Broadcast area: Victorian Community RA1
- Frequency: DAB+: 9A/9B Melbourne

Programming
- Format: Radio reading service
- Network: Vision Australia Radio
- Affiliations: RPH Australia; BBC World Service

Ownership
- Owner: Vision Australia; (Vision Australia Limited)

History
- First air date: 12 December 1982
- Former frequencies: 1705 kHz (1982-1983), 1629 kHz (1983-1990), 1179 kHz (1990-2026)
- Call sign meaning: Radio for the Print Handicapped

Technical information
- Licensing authority: ACMA
- Power: 5000 W
- Transmitter coordinates: 37.742016°S 145.113168°E
- Repeaters: AM: 882 kHz Warrnambool; FM: 93.5 kHz Warragul

Links
- Public licence information: Profile
- Webcast: Listen live (via TuneIn)
- Website: radio.visionaustralia.org

3RPH is a community radio station owned and operated by Vision Australia as part of the Vision Australia Radio network. The station broadcasts a radio reading service to Melbourne, Victoria, with repeater services in Warragul and Warrnambool, Victoria.

The station had its origins in 1974, when the Radio for the Blind Committee began broadcasting a half-hour program on ABC radio and a 45-minute program on 3CR in Melbourne.

The station was then licensed to commence programming on its own frequency, broadcasting from 12 December 1982 at 1705 kHz

In 1983 the station moved its signal to 1629 kHz, before moving to 1179 kHz, vacated by 3KZ, in 1990. The switch to 1179 also led to the station expanding to 24-hour programming.

On 1 July 2026, 3RPH ceased AM radio transmission from 1179 kHz, continuing broadcast on DAB+.

3RPH is also a member of Radio Print Handicapped Network and a BBC World Service partner station.
