= Vision Australia =

- Formation: 2004
- Type: Non-governmental organisation
- Headquarters: Melbourne, Victoria
- Region served: Australia
- CEO: David Williamson
- Website: www.visionaustralia.org

Vision Australia is a not-for-profit organisation that acts as Australia's largest provider of services for blind or low vision people.

== Background ==
Vision Australia was created in 2004 through the merger of the Royal Blind Society (RBS), the Royal Victorian Institute for the Blind (RVIB), Vision Australia Foundation (VAF), and the National Information Library Services (NILS) in July 2004. At the time, legislation needed to be passed through the parliaments of Victoria and New South Wales for this to occur. In 2006, the organisation was further expanded with the merger of the Royal Blind Foundation Queensland. This merger enabled greater access to the organisation across Queensland. Additionally, 2007 saw Hear a Book, a producer of audio books in Tasmania, join Vision Australia in November 2007. In February 2008 it was announced that the Seeing Eye Dogs Australia (SEDA) would also merge with Vision Australia by the end of June 2008. The inclusion of guide dog services meant that Vision Australia was now a national provider to the blindness and low vision community of assistive services.

=== Facilities ===
The Royal Victorian Institute for the Blind (RVIB) was established in 1866 in Melbourne, Victoria, Australia. The original building, in its Gothic Revival style, was designed by architects Crouch and Wilson and completed in 1868. However, it was later demolished and a new building, Ormond Hall for the Blind, named after its benefactor Francis Ormond, was built in 1891 based on designs procured by Nathaniel Billing & Son. Designed by J D McLean of the Public Works Department, the new building was extended in the following years leading to 1933.

The Royal Victorian Institute of the Blind operated a school in Burwood from 1959 to 2009.

The Ormond Hall wing was originally established as a music hall for the blind and is run by the Royal Victorian Institute for the Blind.

==== Associated people ====
Notable staff of the Royal Victorian Institute for the Blind include:

- Ulrich Pfisterer, physical education teacher
- Stanus William Hedger, superintendent and secretary

Life time governors of the Royal Victorian Institute for the Blind include:

- Herbert Taylor
- Jeff Hook

Vice-presidents of the Royal Victorian Institute for the Blind include:

- Alexander Mair

Presidents of the Royal Victorian Institute for the Blind include:

- Jabez Lewis Carnegie
- Frank Nyulasy

== Services ==
The following blindness and low vision services are listed on the Vision Australia website:

- Access Advice
- Accessible Information Solutions
- Audio Description Services
- Audio Publishing
- Children's Services
- Community Education
- Deafblind Services
- Employment Services (Vision Australia is listed as an official JobAccess Supplier)
- Equipment Solutions
- Further Education Bursaries
- Independent Living Services
- Information Library Service
- Low Vision Services
- Policy and Advocacy
- Recreation Services
- Technology and Training Solutions
- Vision Australia Radio

== History and heritage collection ==
The history of Vision Australia's founding organisations go back to the late 1800s and cover much of the struggle for better rights and services for Australia's blind and low vision community.

Given this history, Vision Australia has an extensive heritage collection including many objects and images pertaining to the story and history of the blindness community in Australia.

Some of the heritage collection can be search and viewed in Victorian Collections

== Carols by Candlelight ==
Vision Australia's Carols by Candlelight is the organisation's leading fundraising and awareness campaign and is an Australian Christmas tradition. Dating back to 1938, it is held on Christmas Eve at the Sidney Myer Music Bowl in Melbourne and reaches a television audience of more than 2 million Australians each year.

All proceeds from this event go towards Vision Australia's Children's Services.

Performers at this event have included Rolf Harris, Hugh Jackman, Tina Arena, John Farnham, Debra Byrne, Olivia Newton-John, Lee Kernaghan, Judith Durham, Marina Prior, Denis Walter, Douglas Heywood, Silvie Paladino, Hi-5, Humphrey B Bear, Mickey Mouse, Anthony Callea and long-time host Ray Martin.

Other supporters of this concert include Myer, Nine Network, Disney, 3AW, Magic 1278 and The Herald Sun.

== DAISY ==
DAISY stands for Digital Accessible Information System. It is a format based on the W3C defined SGML applications XHTML 1.0 and SMIL 1.0. Using this framework, a talking book format is presented that enables navigation within a sequential and hierarchical structure consisting of (marked-up) text synchronised with audio.

Vision Australia is currently in the process of digitising and updating its entire library catalogue to the DAISY format for the benefit of its clients. Vision Australia is listed as a member of the DAISY Consortium.

One of the issues associated with digitising the existing library is managing the massive amounts of computer storage that it will require. At present Vision Australia has a 40-terabyte library that can be scaled to 100 terabytes. Ultimately the organisation's goal is to have its library available as online downloads for its community.

== E-voting ==
A step forward for Vision Australia's Policy and Advocacy department was the introduction of electronic voting (or E-voting) at the Victoria State Elections in 2007. For the first time in Australian history, people who were blind were able to vote in secrecy and independently. The Victorian Electoral Commission's e-voting system was set up in response to submissions for electoral reform by Vision Australia and Blind Citizens Australia.

== Partnerships and memberships ==
Vision Australia's Information Library Service is listed in the National Library of Australia Catalogue. Vision Australia is also a member of Vision 2020 and the DAISY Consortium.

Vision Australia has signed Memorandums of Understanding with the Canadian National Institute for the Blind (Canada) and the Royal National Institute of Blind People (UK).
