= Radio reading service =

Service that reads printed material aloud for the blind and vision-impaired

A radio reading service or reading service for the blind is a public service of many universities, community groups and public radio stations, where a narrator reads books, newspapers and magazines aloud for the benefit of the blind and vision-impaired. It is typically broadcast on a subcarrier, with radio receivers permanently tuned to a given station in the area, or an HD Radio subchannel of the offering station. Some reading services use alternative methods for reaching their audiences, including broadcasting over SAP, streaming Internet radio, cable TV, or even terrestrial TV.

The International Association of Audio Information Services (IAAIS) serves as the primary member organization for radio reading services, and has member services or has consulted with and assisted local organizations in Canada, Costa Rica, Dominican Republic, Guatemala, Jamaica, Japan, Mexico, Panama, New Zealand, the Netherlands, the United Kingdom and the United States.

The first radio reading service in the United States was the Minnesota Radio Talking Book Network, started in 1969 by C. Stanley Potter and Robert Watson. After six years of researching the concept, a Kansas philanthropist learned of the Minnesota service, and with their help in 1971 Petey Cerf founded Audio-Reader, the second reading service in the nation, in Lawrence, Kansas. In the late 1970s, Audio-Reader director Rosie Hurwitz and Stan Potter served as the first two presidents of the Association of Radio Reading Services, which came to be known as the National Association of Radio Reading Services, and, finally, IAAIS.

The first radio reading service in Canada was founded by Richard Moses and Gordon Norman in Oakville, Ontario, in the basement of the Woodside Branch of the Oakville Public Library in the mid-1970s.

In the United States, many public radio stations carry a local or regional reading service on an FM subcarrier. They are commonly affiliated with universities, libraries and other non-profit institutions. Reception of these stations require a special receiver, available at no cost to the listener, though most organizations require certification that the potential listener is unable to use normal printed material. Stations in other countries also carry such a service in this fashion. Some radio reading services are broadcast on standard FM stations. WRBH in New Orleans was the first full-time open channel radio reading service, although WRKC in Wilkes-Barre, Pennsylvania has been broadcasting a two-hour-a-day service, the Radio Home Visitor, since 1974. WYPL in Memphis, Tennessee, run by volunteers of the Memphis Public Library, devotes nearly its entire broadcast day to a mixture of live readings and prerecorded readings overnight.

Australia's Radio Print Handicapped Network has stations in all capital cities and some other areas.

The first internet-based reading service was Assistive Media, founded in 1996 by David Erdody in Ann Arbor, Michigan. Most of the over 100 audio information services in the U.S. stream their broadcasts live on the internet, and some offer online archives of previously broadcast programming. Some organizations provide their listeners with internet radios preprogrammed to easily find the internet stream.

== See also ==
- Radio Information Service
- Audio description, an additional narration track for blind and visually impaired consumers of visual media, including television and movies, dance, opera, and visual art
