= Arrernte people =

Group of Aboriginal Australian people

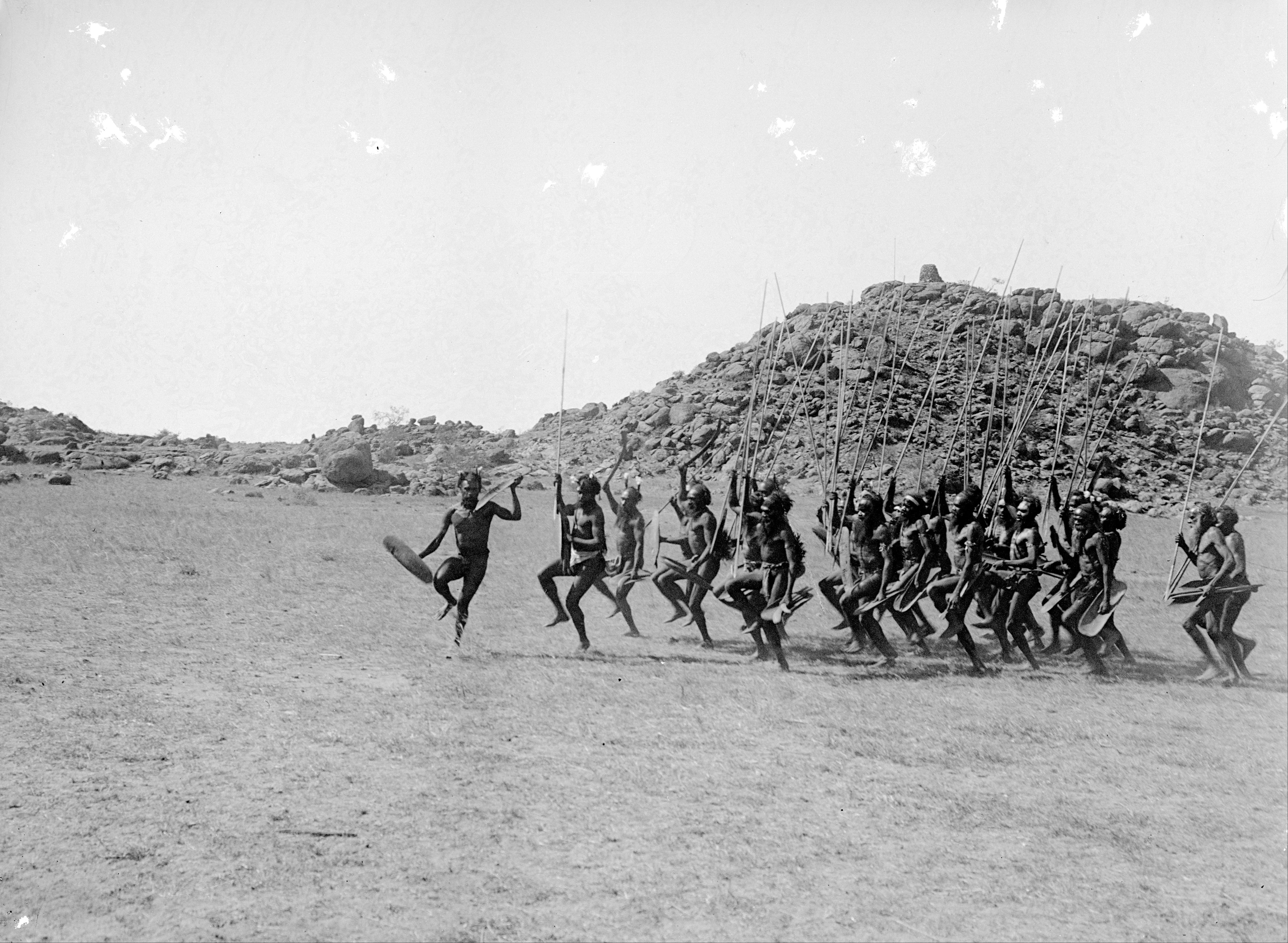
Arrernte welcoming dance, entrance of the strangers, Alice Springs, Central Australia, 9 May 1901, photograph

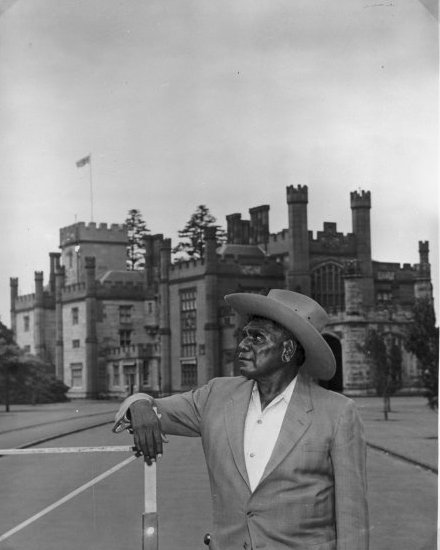
Artist Albert Namatjira was a Western Arrernte man.

The Arrernte (/ˈʌrəndə/) people (also known as Aranda, Arunta or Arrarnta) are a group of Aboriginal Australian peoples who live in the Arrernte lands at Mparntwe (Alice Springs) (Note: Earlier the town was also referred to as Tjoritja, the word for the MacDonnell Ranges, and also frequently as Kapmanta (etymologically, kaputa(head) plus manta (thick), because it struck Arrernte visitor as so many packed corrugated roofs together ('head' as in househead/roof) ('In neuerer Zeit wird Alice Springs häufig Kapmanta genannt:kap ist eine Abkürzing von kaputa = Kopf und manta = dicht.) Kapmanta heißt wörtlich: dichter Kopf. Gemeint sind:dichte Dächer (Dach = des Hauses Kopf) weil hier die Eingeboreren zuerst mit Wellblech gedeckte Dächer gesehen haben'. (Strehlow 1907, p. 42, n.7)) and surrounding areas of the Central Australia region of the Northern Territory. Many still speak one of the various Arrernte dialects. Some Arrernte live in other areas far from their homeland, including the major Australian cities and overseas.

Arrernte spirituality focuses on the landscape and The Dreaming which the Arrernte name for is Altyerre. Altjira is the creator being of the Inapertwa that became all living creatures. Tjurunga are objects of religious significance.

The Arrernte Council is the representative and administrative body for the Arrernte Lands and is part of the Central Land Council.

Tourism is important to the economy of Alice Springs and the surrounding communities. (Note: The Arrernte way of life is presented through tour guides and storytellers speaking of the life, their artwork, their culture and language in a variety of different ways. Tours are run regularly to Hermannsburg and Wallace Rockhole, both of which are (Western) Arrernte, to learn more about the Arrernte way of life, from their artwork to their culture and language.)

== Arrernte languages ==
"Aranda" is a simplified, Australian English approximation of the traditional pronunciation of the name of Arrernte [ˈarəɳ͡ɖa]. The ancestors of the Arrernte all spoke one or more of the many Arrernte dialects in the Arrernte group of languages. Today, several are completely or nearly extinct, but some (especially Eastern or Central Arrernte) are widely spoken and taught in schools.

The Arrernte also had a highly developed sign language.

== Culture ==
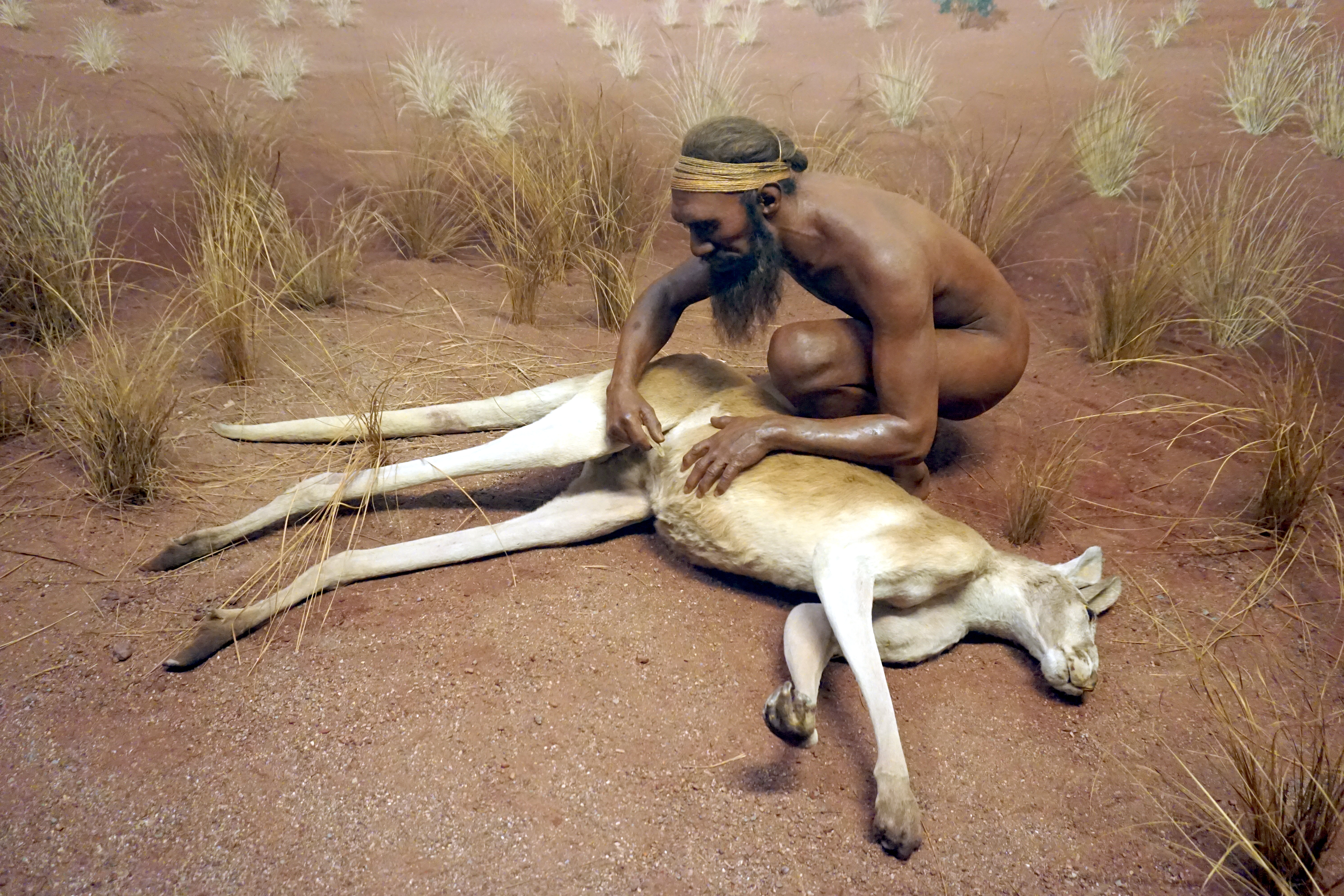
The Hunters of the Central Australian Desert: Arunta Hunter diorama at the Milwaukee Public Museum

Arrernte religion and cultural life were documented thoroughly from the late nineteenth century by the Lutheran missionary Carl Strehlow, the seminal Australian anthropologists Walter Baldwin Spencer and Francis Gillen and later by T. G. H. Strehlow. The Arrernte men worked with Strehlow to document their songs and ceremonies between 1932 and 1974. Arrernte oral history discusses the region of Alice Springs (Mparntwe) and its environs being shaped by primordial caterpillar-beings known as Ayepe-arenye (Hyles livornicoides), Ntyarlke (Hippotion celerio), and Utnerrengatye (Coenotes eremophilae) which were ancestral to the Arrernte people. The eastern MacDonnell Ranges was formed by the Ayepe-arenye, while the western portion of the ranges was formed by Ntyarlke.

== Country ==
The Arrernte's lands, according to Norman Tindale's estimate, encompass some 47,000 square miles (120,000 km^{2}). Of their overall territory he wrote that they were:

At Mount Gosse, Mount Zeil, and Mount Heughlin; on the Finke River to Idracowra, Blood Creek, Macumba, Mount Dare, and Andado, and some distance east into the sandhills of the Arunta (Simpson) Desert; northeast to Intea on the lower Hale River, thence north to Ilbala on Plenty River; west to Inilja and Hart Range, Mount Swan, Gillen Creek, Connor Well, and Narwietooma; in Central MacDonnell, James, and Ooraminna Ranges.

== Sub-divisions ==
The name Arrernte refers to the following distinct groups (or "mobs"):

- Central Arrernte, from the township of Alice Springs and its immediate surrounds.
- Eastern Arrernte, from the Arrernte lands east of Alice Springs.
- Western Arrarnta, from the Arrernte lands west of Alice Springs, out to Mutitjulu and King's Canyon.

== Notable people ==
- Albert Namatjira
- Rosalie Kunoth-Monks
- Charles Perkins
- Pat Miller

== See also ==
- Arrernte language
- Veronica Perrule Dobson
- HMAS Arunta
- Margaret Kemarre Turner

Spirituality and mythology

- Altjira
- Inapertwa
- Tjurunga

== General and cited sources ==
- "Aboriginal Art Culture and Tourism Australia". Aboriginal Australia Art & Culture Centre.
- "AIATSIS map of Indigenous Australia". AIATSIS. 28 March 2025.
- Brooks, David (1991). A Town Like Mparntwe: A Guide to the Dreaming Tracks and Sites of Alice Springs. Jukurrpa Books. ISBN 978-1-864-65045-7.
- Dixon, R. M. W. (2002). Australian Languages: Their Nature and Development. Cambridge University Press. ISBN 978-0-521-47378-1.
- Gibson, Jason (2020). Ceremony Men: Making Ethnography and the Return of the Strehlow Collection. SUNY Press. ISBN 9781438478548.
- Kearney, Simon (20 September 2007). "Another language faces sunset in dead centre" (PDF). The Australian, Swarthmore College.
- Kendon, Adam (1988). Sign Languages of Aboriginal Australia: Cultural, Semiotic and Communicative Perspectives. Cambridge University Press. ISBN 978-0-521-36008-1.
- Kenny, Anna (2013). The Aranda's Pepa: An introduction to Carl Strehlow's Masterpiece Die Aranda- und Loritja-Stämme in Zentral-Australien (1907-1920). Australian National University. ISBN 978-1-921-53677-9. JSTOR j.ctt5hgz6k.10.
- Morton, John (2013). "'Less was hidden among these children': Géza Roheim, Anthropology and the Politics of Aboriginal Childhood". In Eickelkamp, Ute (ed.). Growing Up In Central Australia: New Anthropological Studies of Aboriginal Childhood and Adolescence. Berghahn Books. pp. 15–48. ISBN 978-1-782-38127-3.
- Ryan, Mark David; Deane, Michael; Cunningham, Stuart (2008). "Australian Indigenous Art: Local Dreamings, Global Consumption". In Anheier, Helmut K.; Isar, Yudhishthir Raj (eds.). Cultures and Globalization: The Cultural Economy. SAGE. pp. 284–291. ISBN 978-1-473-90357-9.
- Short, John Rennie (2013). Globalization, Modernity and the City. Routledge. ISBN 978-1-136-67151-7.
- Strehlow, C. (1907). Leonhardi, Moritz von (ed.). Die Aranda- und Loritja-Stämme in Zentral-Australien: Part 1 Mythen, Sagen und Märchen des Aranda –Stammes (PDF). Joseph Baer & Co.
- Strehlow, C. (1908). Leonhardi, Moritz von (ed.). Die Aranda- und Loritja-Stämme in Zentral-Australien: Part 2. Mythen, Sagen und Märchen des Loritja–Stämmes (PDF). Joseph Baer & Co.
- Strehlow, C. (1910). Leonhardi, Moritz von (ed.). Die Aranda- und Loritja-Stämme in Zentral-Australien Part 3 (PDF). Joseph Baer & Co.
- Strehlow, C. (1913a). Die Aranda- und Loritja-Stämme in Zentral-Australien Part 4: Abteilung (PDF). Joseph Baer & Co.
- Strehlow, C. (1913b). Die Aranda- und Loritja-Stämme in Zentral-Australien.: Part 4. 1 Abteilung: Stammbaum Tafeln (PDF). Joseph Baer & Co.
- Strehlow, C. (1920). Die Aranda- und Loritja-Stämme in Zentral-Australien: Part 5 (PDF). Joseph Baer & Co.
- Tindale, Norman Barnett (1974). "Aranda". Aboriginal Tribes of Australia: Their Terrain, Environmental Controls, Distribution, Limits, and Proper Names. Australian National University Press. ISBN 978-0-708-10741-6. Archived from the original on 20 March 2020.
- Turpin, Myfany (August 2004). "Have you ever wondered why Arrernte is spelt the way it is?". Central Land Council.
