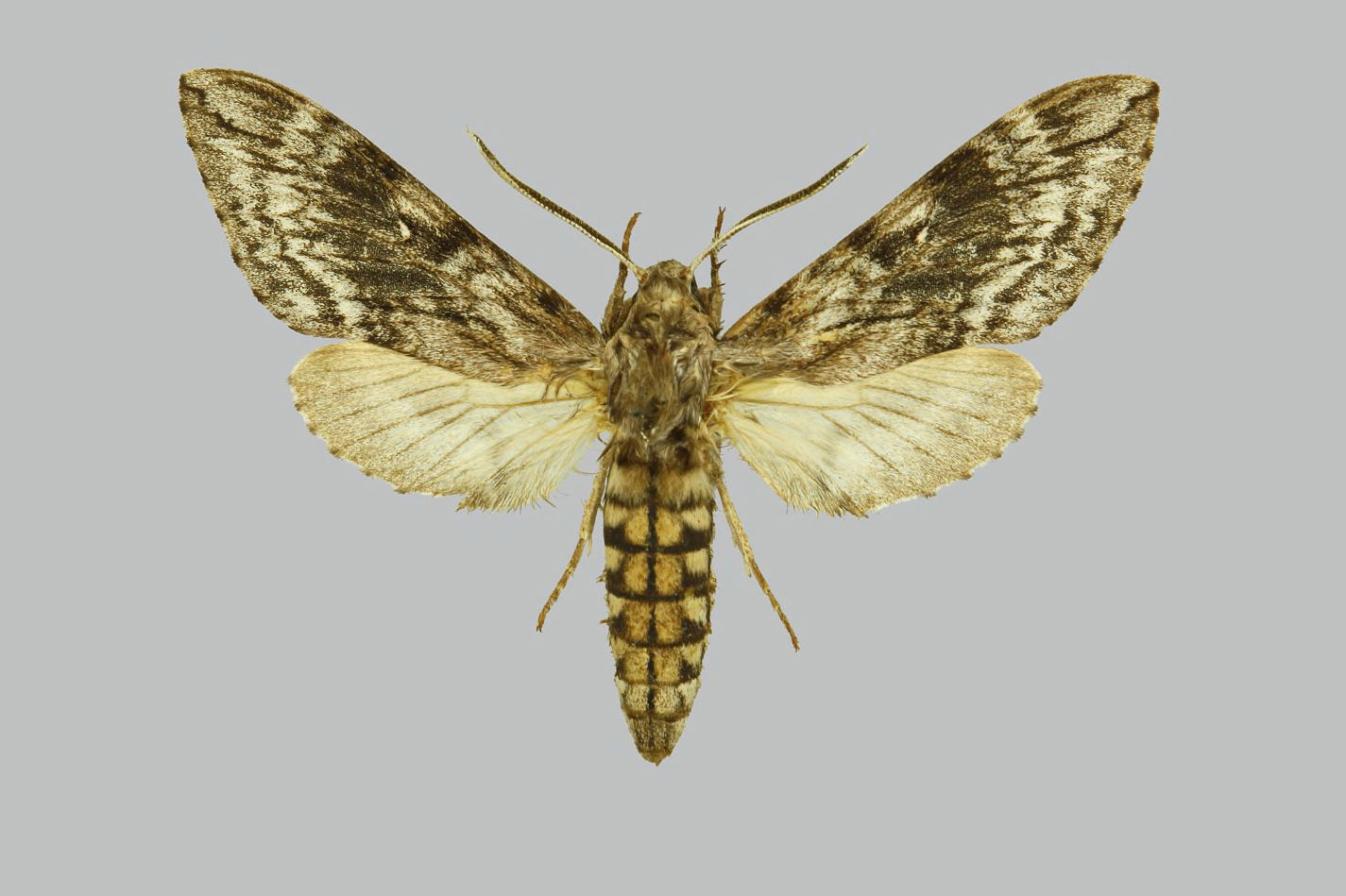

Scientific classification
- Domain: Eukaryota
- Kingdom: Animalia
- Phylum: Arthropoda
- Class: Insecta
- Order: Lepidoptera
- Family: Sphingidae
- Genus: Coenotes
- Species: C. eremophilae

Binomial name
- Coenotes eremophilae (T. P. Lucas, 1891)

Synonyms
- Sphinx eremophilae T. P. Lucas, 1891; Protoparce minimus Miskin, 1891

= Coenotes eremophilae =

Species of moth

Coenotes eremophilae is a species of moth of the family Sphingidae first described by Thomas Pennington Lucas in 1891. It is known from Queensland, Western Australia and the Northern Territory.

The wingspan is about 50 mm.

The larvae have been recorded feeding on Eremophila bowmanii, Eremophila freelingii, Eremophila latrobei, Eremophila longifolia, Eremophila sturtii, Eremophila mitchellii, Myoporum deserti, Myoporum montanum, Carissa lanceolata, Gyrocarpus americanus, Prostanthera striatiflora, Hibiscus panduriformis, Acacia farnesitana, Sesamum indicum, Santalum acuminatum, Duboisia myoporoides and Clerodendrum floribundum.
