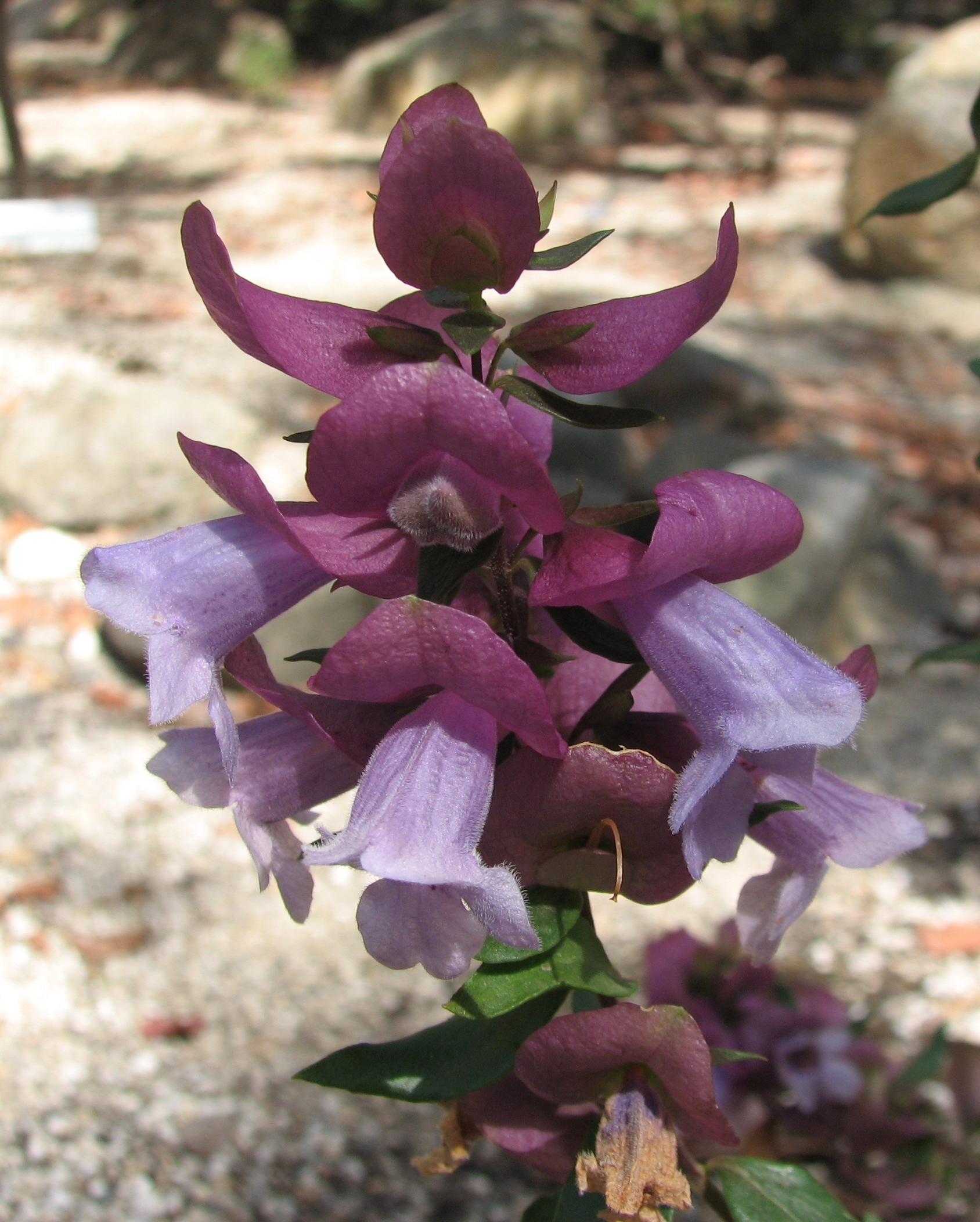
- In Maranoa Gardens

Scientific classification
- Kingdom: Plantae
- Clade: Tracheophytes
- Clade: Angiosperms
- Clade: Eudicots
- Clade: Asterids
- Order: Lamiales
- Family: Lamiaceae
- Genus: Prostanthera
- Species: P. magnifica

Binomial name
- Prostanthera magnifica C.A.Gardner
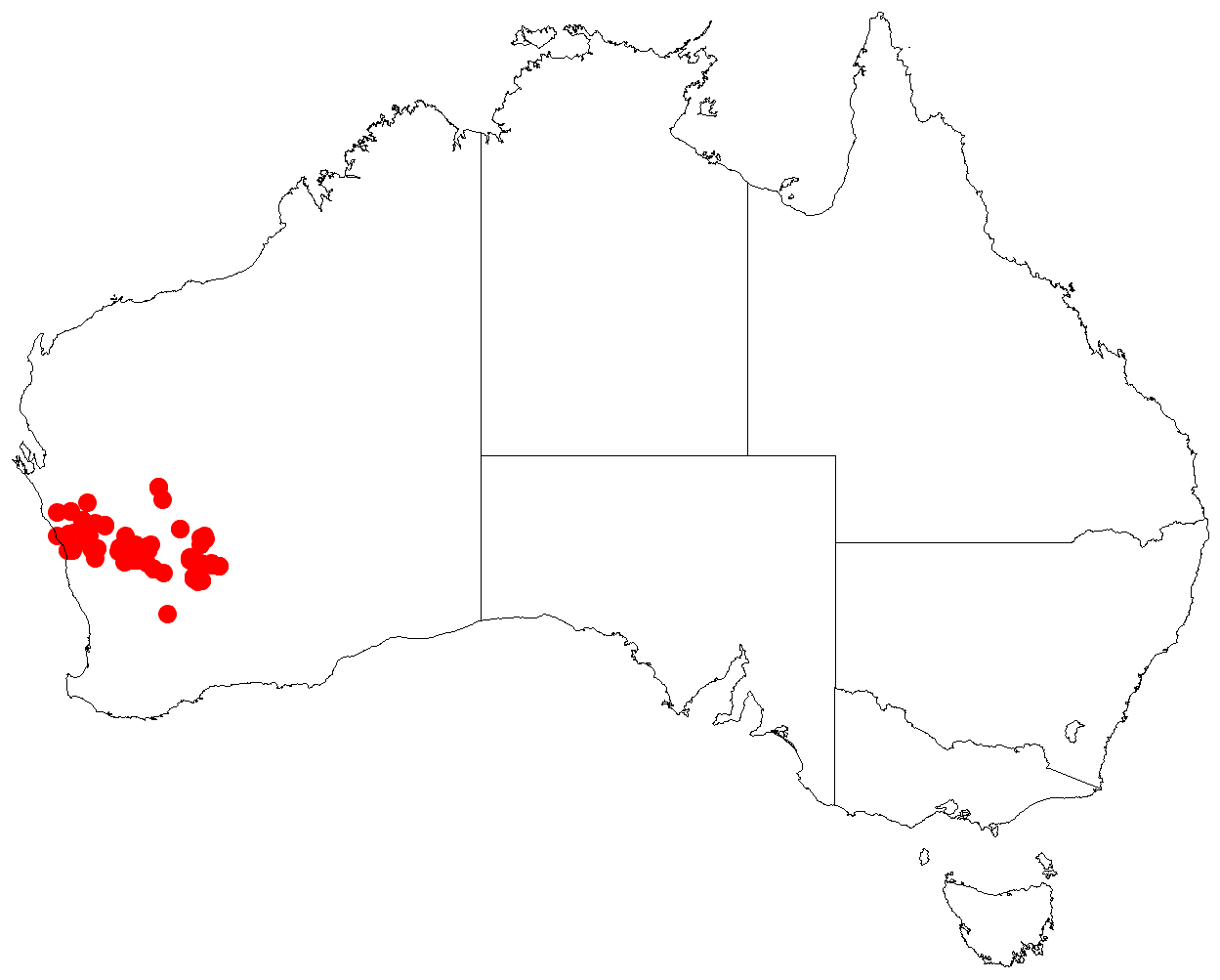
- Occurrence data from AVH

= Prostanthera magnifica =

Magnificent prostanthera

Species of flowering plant

Prostanthera magnifica, commonly known as magnificent prostanthera, is a species of flowering plant in the family Lamiaceae and is endemic to Western Australia. It is a slender to spreading, erect shrub that has hairy stems, elliptical to narrow egg-shaped leaves and pale mauve or pale blue to pink flowers with prominent dark mauve to purple sepals.

== Description ==
Prostanthera magnifica is a slender, to spreading, erect shrub that typically grows to a height of 0.4–2.5 m (1 ft 4 in – 8 ft 2 in) and has slightly flattened, more or less hairy branches. The leaves are elliptic to narrow egg-shaped, 15–44 mm (0.59–1.73 in) long and 5–10 mm (0.20–0.39 in) wide on a petiole 1–4 mm (0.039–0.157 in) long. The flowers are arranged in bunches of six to eighteen near the ends of branchlets, each flower on a pedicel 2.5–6 mm (0.098–0.236 in) long. The sepals are dark mauve to purple, forming a tube 2–4 mm (0.079–0.157 in) long with two prominent, egg-shaped lobes, the lower lobe 4–10 mm (0.16–0.39 in) long and 4–8 mm (0.16–0.31 in) wide, the upper lobe 15–26 mm (0.59–1.02 in) long and 10–23 mm (0.39–0.91 in) wide. The petals are pale mauve or pale blue to pink with dark purple spots, 16–25 mm (0.63–0.98 in) long forming a tube 15–20 mm (0.59–0.79 in) long with two lips. The central lobe of the lower lip is 4–7.5 mm (0.16–0.30 in) long and 2.5–7 mm (0.098–0.276 in) wide and the side lobes 4–6 mm (0.16–0.24 in) long and 2–5.5 mm (0.079–0.217 in) wide. The upper lip is 4–8 mm (0.16–0.31 in) long and 2.5–5 mm (0.098–0.197 in) wide with a central notch 1–2 mm (0.039–0.079 in) deep. Flowering occurs from August to November.

== Taxonomy ==
Prostanthera magnifica was first formally described in 1943 by Charles Austin Gardner in the Journal of the Royal Society of Western Australia from specimens collected near Mullewa by William Blackall.

== Distribution and habitat ==
Magnificent prostanthera grows on granite outcrops, ironstone hills and rock crevices in the Avon Wheatbelt, Coolgardie, Geraldton Sandplains, Murchison and Yalgoo biogeographic regions of Western Australia.

== Conservation status ==
This mintbush is classified as "not threatened" by the Western Australian Government Department of Parks and Wildlife.

== Use in horticulture ==
Prostanthera magnifica prefers a sunny or partly shaded position in well-drained soil. It is sensitive to both frost and humidity. Propagation is successful from both seed and cuttings, though seed germination is slow. Grafting is often used to produce a longer-living plant with rootstocks including Westringia fruticosa and Prostanthera striatiflora. The latter gives rise to plants with a longer flowering period and less unwanted growth below the graft.
