= Moritz von Leonhardi =

German anthropologist (1856–1910)

Moritz Freiherr von Leonhardi (9 March 1856 – 27 October 1910) was a German anthropologist.

== Life and work ==
Leonhardi was the son of the Minister Plenipotentiary Ludwig (Louis) Freiherr von Leonhardi and Luise, née Bennigsen. He grew up in Karben and Darmstadt. He studied law in Heidelberg until he had to cancel due to sickness. Since then he lived in Karben. Moritz von Leonhardi is a nephew of the liberal politician Rudolf von Bennigsen.

He worked as a private scholar in Groß Karben, from where he corresponded with scientists. Since 1899, encouraged by the novel publications of Walter Baldwin Spencer and Francis Gillen on Australian cultures, he connected with missionaries in Australia, especially to Carl Strehlow, missionary conductor in Centralaustralian Hermannsburg. Since 1907 Leonhardi engaged in the lively anthropological scientific discussion with the publication of the first volume of the Arrernte - and Loritja tribes. Amongst other things he was concerned with the acceptance and positive assessment of the existence of a high god of the Aranda. Leonhardi frankly opposed to Spencer and Gillen, who in his time were influential scientists.

The contemporary discussion around 1900 was affected by a severe lack of acceptance towards the, according to the European view, newly discovered cultures of the Aborigines. Therefore, Spencer and Gillen followed the evolutionistic cultural anthropology of Edward Tylor and James Frazer. In contrast Leonhardi stood for a humanistic notion of anthropology in the tradition of Adolf Bastian and Rudolf Virchow. Leonhardi managed to confirm his claim for acceptance of the Aborigine-Cultures mainly in collaboration with Carl Strehlow and with a preciser handling of sources as the one of his scientific opponents. These texts constitute a possible base for political claims of the Aborigines in the 21st century. (Kenny, 65) Strehlows and Leonhardi's heavy critique of Gillen's and Spencer's absolutely wrong translations and interpretations, as for example translating the Aranda-word 'Alcheringa' into 'Dreamtime', still influencing today's popular literatur, is granted in latest researches. (Völker, Nicholls)

Due to his unsound health, Leonhardi never went to Australia. As an arm-chair-researcher, he was reliant on the collaboration with local partners. He had an agile correspondence with Carl Strehlow, in which he developed extensive questionnaires on topics like geography, language, social systems, marriage rules, totemism, initiation rites, monotheism, conceptions of soul, burial rites, clothing, adornment or ceremonial life. Monotheistic ideas were of special importance to him. Although Leonhardi published on Australian topics throughout his life, he acted out of a comprehensive anthropological interest, and worked on cultures in Europe, North America and New-Guinea.

While making missionaries familiar with the technical terms and the doctrines of other scientists, sending them technical literature, commented by himself, Moritz von Leonhardi gradually dissolved the boundaries between informant and scientist. Thereby he allowed the missionaries to have their own scientific opinion. Also Leonhardi published the writings of the missionaries under their names, which was an unusual method for an armchair-researcher, to appear only as an editor and not as an author. Amongst discussions in terms of content, a controversy about methodological issues of data provision, field-research and scientific handling of sources was provoked.

In the course of the exchange, Moritz von Leonhardi had brought ethnographic, zoologic and botanic objects to Europe and gave them to several museums, especially the Museum for Ethnology in Frankfurt am Main (today the Museum of World Cultures) as well as the Senckenberg Research Institute. Numerous Australian plants have been sown for the first time in Europe in a specially built green house in Groß Karben, the grown plants are brought to their destination at the Research Institute Senckenberg in Frankfurt.

== Legacy and Honours ==
Up to his death, Leonhardi couldn't compete with the well organized networks of Spencer and Gillen. With his early death, the German-speaking anthropological research on Australia came to a standstill for a longer period. His own network became anchorless because of his death and collapsed. Since then, especially Strehlow lost access to scientific discussions. The journal Leonhardi initiated and edited, containing the writings of Strehlow, was discussed by Lucien Lévy-Bruhl (La Mythologie Primitive), Émile Durkheim (Les formes élémentaires de la vie religieuse), Elias Canetti (Masse und Macht), and others. Lately a new reception begins.

He was honored for his research, by the naming of the vespid Belonogaster leonhardii and the lizard Ctenotus leonhardii after him. The ethnological museum in Frankfurt appointed him as a perpetual member.

== Works ==
- Über einige religiöse und totemistische Vorstellungen der Aranda und Loritja in Zentralaustralien, in: Globus (1907) Bd. 91, 285-290
- Einige Sagen des Arandastammes in Zentral Australien, gesammelt von Missionar C. Strehlow, Hermannsburg, Südaustralien, in: Globus (1907) Bd. 92, 123-126
- Über einige Hundefiguren des Diristammes in Zentralaustralien, in: Globus (1908) Bd. 94, 378-380
- Der Mura und die Maramura der Dieri, in: Anthropos (1909) Bd. 4, 1065–1068
- Geschlechtstotemismus, in: Globus (1910) Bd. 97, 339
- Carl Strehlow: Die Aranda- und Loritja-Stämme in Zentral-Australien, Hg. Städtisches Völkerkunde-Museum Frankfurt am Main, 5 Bde., Bd. 1-4 bearbeitet v. Moritz Freiherr v. Leonhardi, Frankfurt

== Sources ==
- Harriet Völker, Missionare als Ethnologen. Moritz Freiherr v. Leonhardi, australische Mission und europäische Wissenschaft, in: Reinhard Wendt (Hg.) Sammeln, Vernetzen, Auswerten, Missionare und ihr Beitrag zum Wandel Europäischer Weltsicht, Tübingen 2001, 173-210 (ISBN 3-8233-5433-7).
- Anna Kenny, A sketch portrait: Carl Strehlow’s editor Baron Moritz von Leonhardi, in: Anna Kenny und Scott Mitchell (Hg.), Strehlow Research Centre Occasional Paper 4: Collaboration and Language, Alice Springs 2005, 54–69.
- Martin Thomas (Hg.), Culture in Translation – The Anthropological Legacy of R. H. Mathews, Canberra 2005.
- Bronislaw Malinowski, The Family – Among the Australian Aboriginies, New York 1963 (e. A. London 1913).
- Les Dollin, The lost Percincta Bees of Baron von Leonhardi in Central Australia, in: Aussie Bee Bulletin (November 2001) Issue 18.
- Henrika Kuklick, ‘Humanity in the chrysalis Stage’: indigenous Australians in the anthropological imagination, 1899–1926, in: The British Journal for the History of Science (2006) vol. 39:4, 535–568.
- Angus Nicholls, Anglo-German mythologics: the Australian Aborigines and modern theories of myth in the work of Baldwin Spencer and Carl Strehlow, in: History of the Human Sciences (February 2007) vol. 20, 83–114.
