= Numakulla =

Two sky Gods who created all life on earth in Aboriginal Australian mythology

In Australian aboriginal mythology, the Numakulla (or Numbakulla) were two sky gods who created all life on Earth, including humans, from the Inapertwa. Afterwards, they became lizards. The Numakulla are sometimes described as a dual-aspect deity rather than two separate deities.
