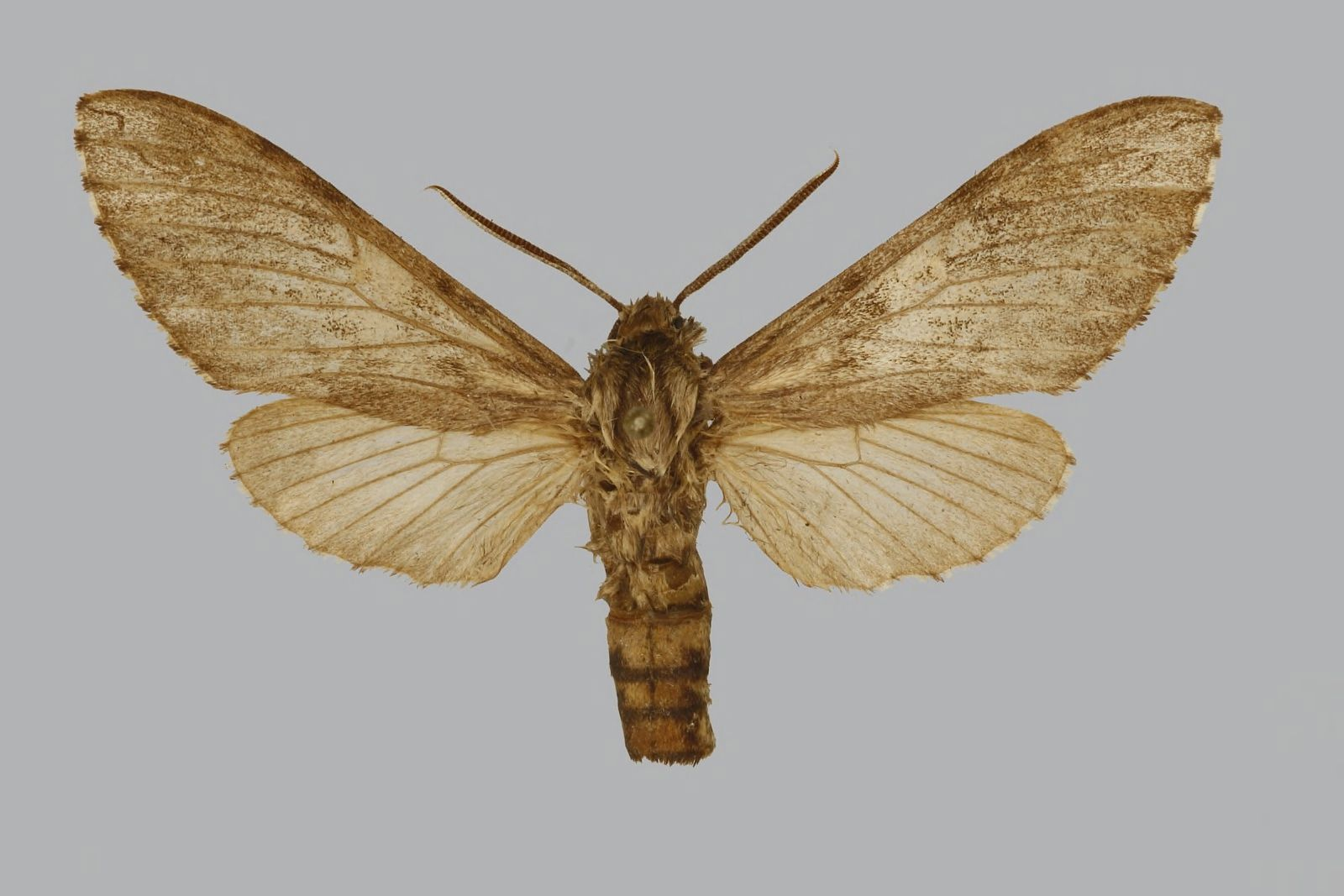
- Male

Scientific classification
- Domain: Eukaryota
- Kingdom: Animalia
- Phylum: Arthropoda
- Class: Insecta
- Order: Lepidoptera
- Family: Sphingidae
- Genus: Coenotes
- Species: C. jakli

Binomial name
- Coenotes jakli Haxaire & Melichar, 2007

= Coenotes jakli =

Species of moth

Coenotes jakli is a species of moth of the family Sphingidae. It is known from the Tanimbar Islands.
