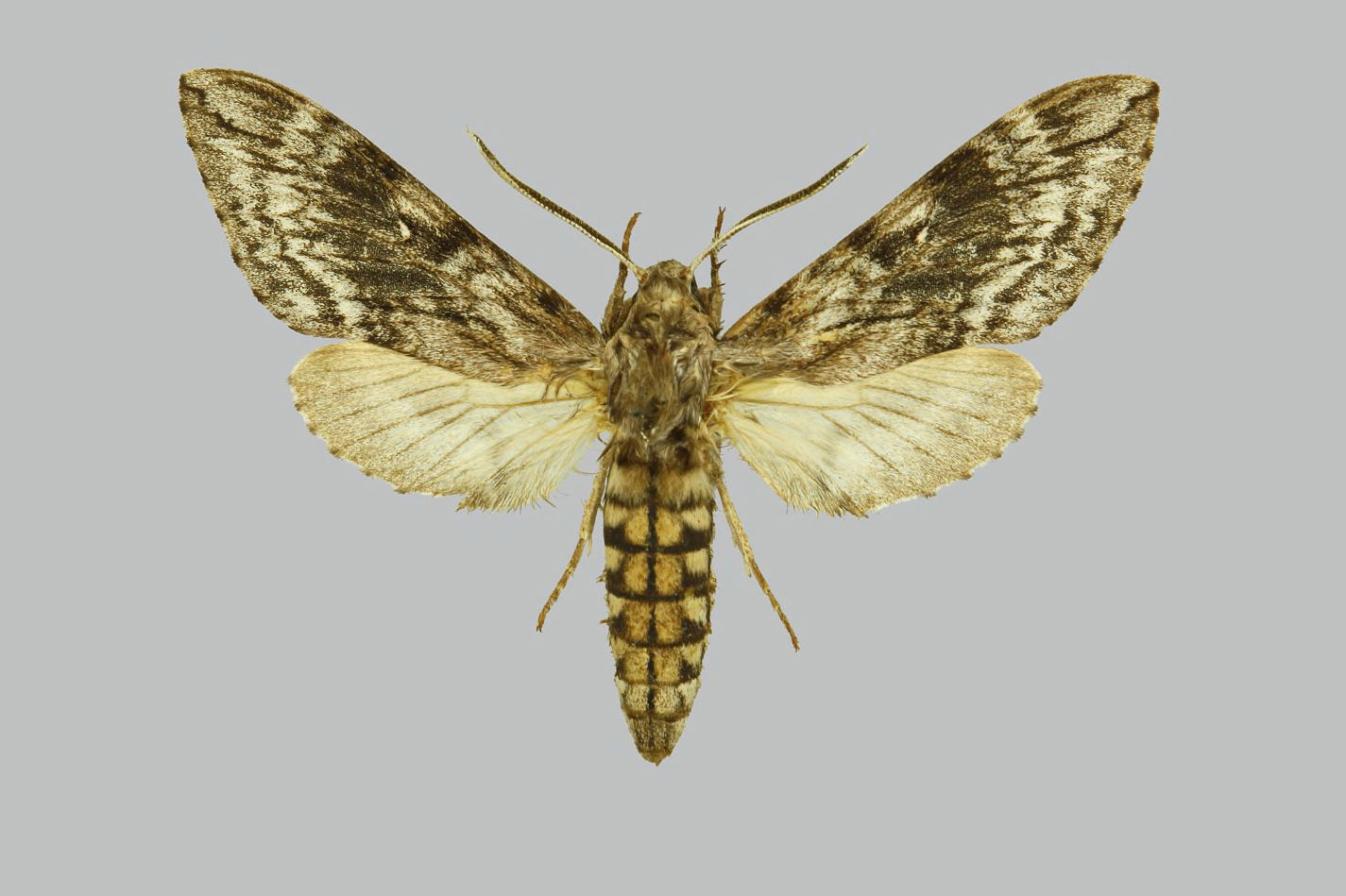
- Coenotes eremophilae

Scientific classification
- Domain: Eukaryota
- Kingdom: Animalia
- Phylum: Arthropoda
- Class: Insecta
- Order: Lepidoptera
- Family: Sphingidae
- Tribe: Sphingulini
- Genus: Coenotes; Rothschild & Jordan, 1903

= Coenotes =

Genus of moths

Coenotes is a genus of moths in the family Sphingidae. The genus was erected by Walter Rothschild and Karl Jordan in 1903.

== Species ==
- Coenotes eremophilae (Lucas 1891)
- Coenotes jakli Haxaire & Melichar, 2007
