= Pat Miller (Australian) =

Indigenous Australian activist (1946–2026)

Patricia Ann Miller AO was an Indigenous Australian (Arrernte) elder who was known for her advocacy work. Miller was named NAIDOC Aboriginal of the Year Award in 1995, and was the NT Australian of the Year in 2004.

== Biography ==
She was born on the Angas Downs Station, in the Northern Territory.
