= Ctenotus leonhardii =

Conservation status
- Least Concern (IUCN 3.1)

Scientific classification
- Kingdom: Animalia
- Phylum: Chordata
- Class: Reptilia
- Order: Squamata
- Family: Scincidae
- Genus: Ctenotus
- Species: C. leonhardii

Binomial name
- Ctenotus leonhardii (Sternfeld, 1919)
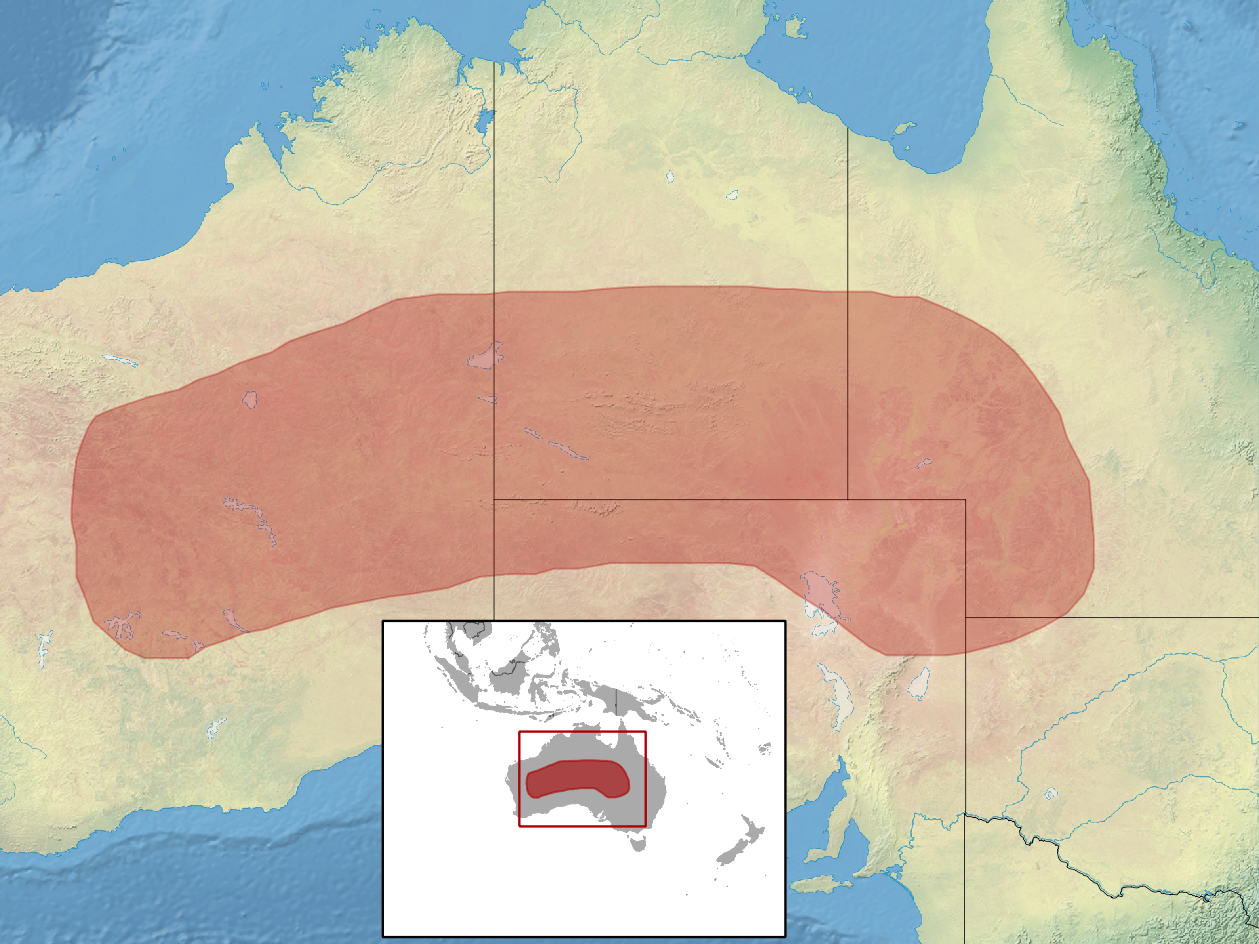

Synonyms
- Lygosoma leonhardii Sternfeld, 1919; Sphenomorphus leonhardii (Sternfeld, 1919)

Species of lizard

Ctenotus leonhardii, known by the common names Leonhardi's ctenotus, Leonhardi's skink, and the common desert ctenotus, is a species of lizard in the subfamily Sphenomorphinae of the family Scincidae. The species is found in a range of arid and semi-arid regions throughout mainland Australia. Named after German anthropologist Moritz von Leonhardi in 1919, it belongs to the genus Ctenotus, one of the largest genera of lizards in Australia.

== Description ==
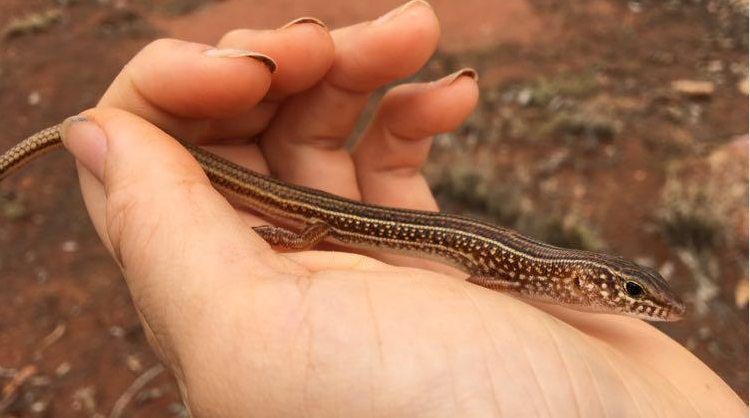
Ctenotus leonhardii

Leonhardi's ctenotus is a small, slender terrestrial skink. This species is typically brown to ochre-brown above, sometimes with a dark brown stripe running down the vertebral row of dorsal scales. There are pale stripes running from the eyes down to the tail on either side, often with a dark brown edge above. Below this stripe is a darker, sometimes black lateral stripe with a complex pattern of white spots over the top. From the groin there is a pale cream stripe running towards the flanks, with a series of white spots near the arms and a continuing pale lateral stripe down the length of the tail. Like all other Ctenotus species, Leonhardi's ctenotus has four limbs, five digits on each limb, and smooth scales, with a distinctive row of small scales near the ear.

Leonhardi's ctenotus adults can grow to a maximum snout-to-vent length (SVL) of 7.9 cm (3.1 in), weighing on average 9.14 g (0.322 oz). Males and females grow to a similar size, unlike many other Ctenotus species which demonstrate sexual dimorphism. Leonhardi's ctenotus is one of the slower growing Ctenotus species, reaching maturity at 18 months. Juveniles grow at a rate of 0.22 mm (0.0087 in) per day from hatching and commonly live for 5 years, though the oldest recorded specimen was 7 years old.

== Etymology and taxonomy ==
Leonhardi's ctenotus was named after German anthropologist Moritz von Leonhardi by herpetologist Richard Sternfeld in 1919. The species is in the Scincidae family (skinks), belonging to the genus Ctenotus. In the past this genus was included within the genus Sphenomorphus, before being raised to generic status in 1964. Ctenotus species are commonly called "comb-eared skinks" due to the shape of the small scales near the ear. Ctenotus is one of the largest genera of lizards in Australia, containing nearly 100 species. It is one of the most abundant genera of lizards in arid and semi-arid Australia, and one of the most diverse genera of terrestrial vertebrates globally. Ctenotus is further divided into a number of species groups that are based on morphological similarity and which include the Ctenotus leonhardii group, to which Leonhardi's ctenotus belongs.

== Distribution ==
Leonhardi's ctenotus is found in the arid and semi-arid regions of central Western Australia, the lower half of the Northern Territory, northern South Australia, south-west Queensland and north-west New South Wales. It is a common species in these regions, often seen basking in the sun in the morning in open areas.

== Habitat and ecology ==
Leonhardi's ctenotus has been found in a range of arid habitat types including open grasslands, sandplain deserts dominated by spinifex, and semi-arid shrublands. It is particularly abundant in acacia and chenopod-dominated shrublands and prefers habitats with grassy groundcover. Spinifex tussocks provide protection from predators, harsh environmental conditions and an abundant supply of insects. Within chenopod-dominated ecosystems, this species has been found to be significantly associated with high densities of Maireana species. It is a burrowing skink and shelters in burrows with at least two entrances.

Like many other lizards, Leonhardii's ctenotus is able to survive in harsh desert environments due to the use of ectothermy which allows metabolic inactivity to occur in harsh conditions (i.e. aestivation). However, unlike some other lizard species Leonhardi's ctenotus is diurnal and active during the hottest hours of the day As a result, it has the highest active body temperature recorded for any skink species.

The home range of Leonhardi's ctenotus ranges from 20-60 square meters (215–646 square feet), similar to the home range size for other Ctenotus species. Leonhardi's ctenotus is carnivorous, with a generalist insectivore diet. It is an active forager, foraging within the open spaces between grasses and other groundcover plants for prey. The majority of foraging occurs around midday, with the bulk of the diet being made up of cockroaches, spiders, grasshoppers, silverfish, beetles, weevils, and the larvae of moths and butterflies. Unlike most other Ctenotus species, Leonhardi's ctenotus rarely eats termites but will when other prey are scarce. Major native predators of Leonhardi's ctenotus include Gould's goanna (Varanus gouldii) and the rusty desert monitor (Varanus eremius). High densities of introduced predators like foxes have also been associated with lower recapture success in mark-recapture surveys of Leonhardi's ctenotus, suggesting predation by this species.

Densities of Leonhardi's ctenotus have been found to be negatively associated with increased rainfall, with peak densities occurring during prolonged dry periods. However, individual body condition has been found to deteriorate in dry years compared to years with higher rainfall. Leonhardi's ctenotus is often sympatric with numerous other Ctenotus species in the arid zones, with up to 14 species from this genus sometimes co-occurring in one area.

== Reproduction ==
Leonhardi's ctenotus reproduces by sexual reproduction. Spermatogenesis, ovulation and mating occur most typically in spring, though breeding can occur anytime between October and February. The species is oviparous, laying 5 eggs on average. However, clutch size is highly variable and dependent upon environmental conditions, with no successful reproduction occurring in some years. Furthermore, clutch size is variable across different regions, with Leonhardi's ctenotus in South Australia commonly laying only 2 eggs, while the same species in the Great Victoria Desert regularly lays up to 7 eggs. Juvenile survival is often low, with only 10-30% of juveniles surviving to adulthood.

== Conservation status ==
Leonhardi's ctenotus is listed as a species of Least Concern under the IUCN and is a common and widespread species within its preferred habitat.
