= Inapertwa =

Ancestral creatures with which the Numakulla modelled all life in Arrernte mythology

In Aboriginal mythology (specifically: Arrernte), the Inapertwa are the simple, ancestral creatures with which the Numakulla modelled all life (plant, animals, birds) on Earth. From these they formed human beings. The "totems" of the Arrernte are named after individual Inapertwa formed into animals, then into humans.
