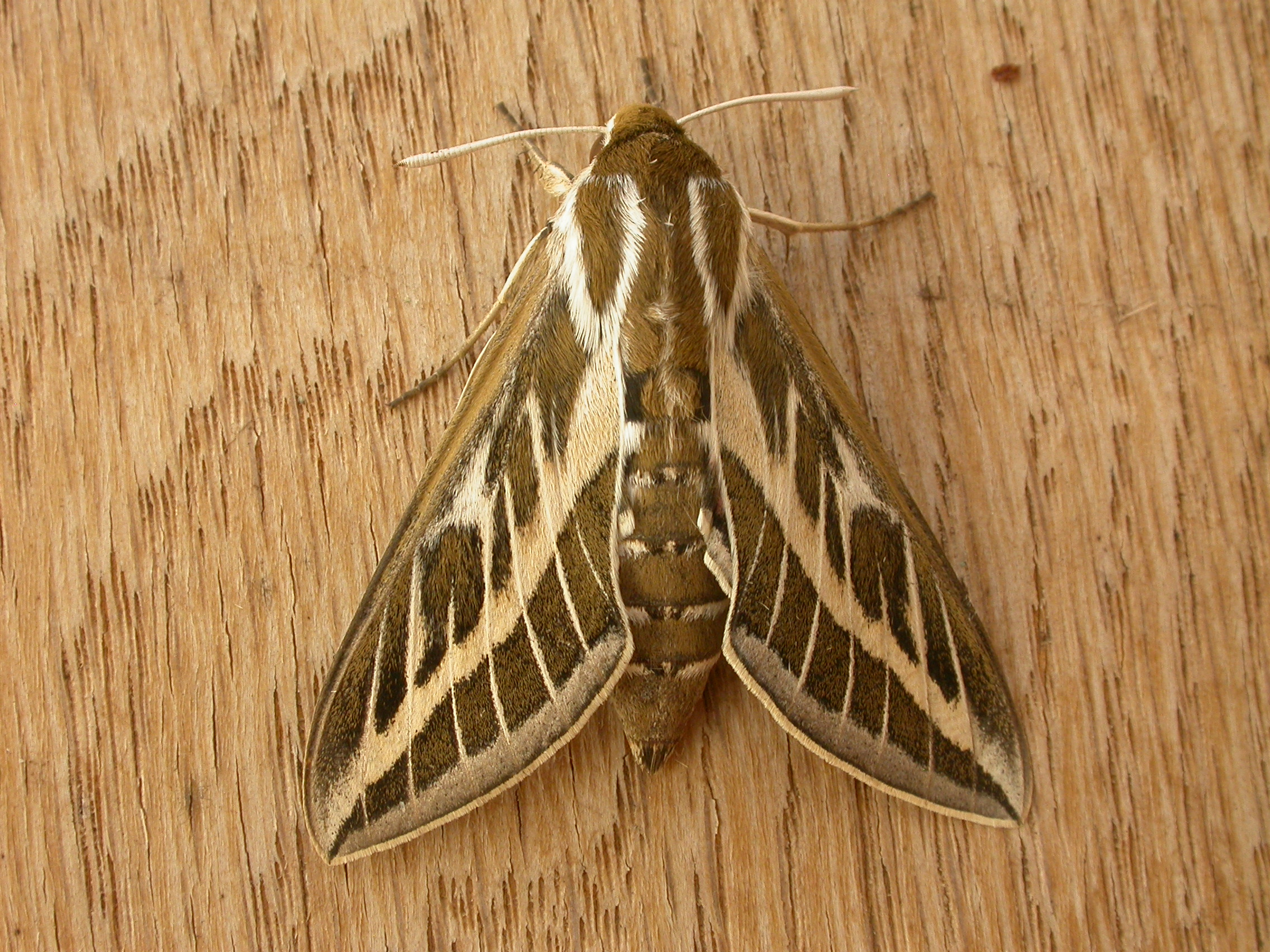

Scientific classification
- Kingdom: Animalia
- Phylum: Arthropoda
- Class: Insecta
- Order: Lepidoptera
- Family: Sphingidae
- Genus: Hyles
- Species: H. livornicoides

Binomial name
- Hyles livornicoides (Lucas, 1892)

Synonyms
- Deilephila livornicoides T. P. Lucas. 1892; Hyles linearis T. P. Lucas, 1892; Phryxus australasiae Tutt, 1904

= Hyles livornicoides =

Species of moth

The Australian striped hawk moth (Hyles livornicoides) is a moth of the family Sphingidae first described by the Scottish-born Australian medical practitioner, naturalist, author, philosopher and utopianist; Thomas Pennington Lucas in 1892. H. livornicoides was once a common food source for the Arrente community in Central Australia, however is not consumed anymore due to their sacredness and increasing scarcity. The local name for the caterpillar is 'Ayepe-arenye', often anglicised as 'Yeperenye' or 'Yipirinya'.

== Distribution ==
H. livornicoides is found in throughout mainland Australia in New South Wales, South Australia, the Northern Territory, Queensland, Victoria, the Australian Capital Territory and Western Australia. Sightings of the moth produce a scattered distribution with few sightings in northern Western Australia, and a high frequency of sightings along a coastal area above the NSW/Queensland border.

== Description ==
In the early stages of its caterpillar form, H. Livornicoides is green with a dark dorsal line, ending at a stumpy black tail spike. During the third and fourth instars, the caterpillar develops black-edged orange eyespots along each side, joined by a pale line. The spiracles become white circled with black, which are each surrounded by smaller black-edged white spots. During H. Livornicoides' final instar, they may become green, brown or black in colour, and their tail spike becomes strongly curved backwards. The dorsal line may become either white, sometimes accompanied with orange edges, or plain orange, and the line connecting the eyespots will become paler and wider, almost entirely covering the eyespots.

H. Livornicoides, in its caterpillar form, can grow up to 55mm in length. They prefer to burrow into the soil to pupate, however will pupate in crevices or under debris. The pupa has a length of about 30mm.

H. Livornicoides, as an adult moth, has brown forewings with white markings, including a distinct white stripe. Its hindwings are brown with a broad diagonal pink stripe on each side. The adult moth has an average wingspan of about 60mm.

In four closely related moth species, the upper side of the abdomen possesses at least three pairs of subdorsal black spots, and the median white line has a row of small black spots on either side, one per segment. The presence of these dorso-lateral spots can be determined through a few remaining scales on the A3 section of the abdomen, however, its extent cannot be determined, and is present on the A4 section, however, it is restricted to the fringe of the tergite.

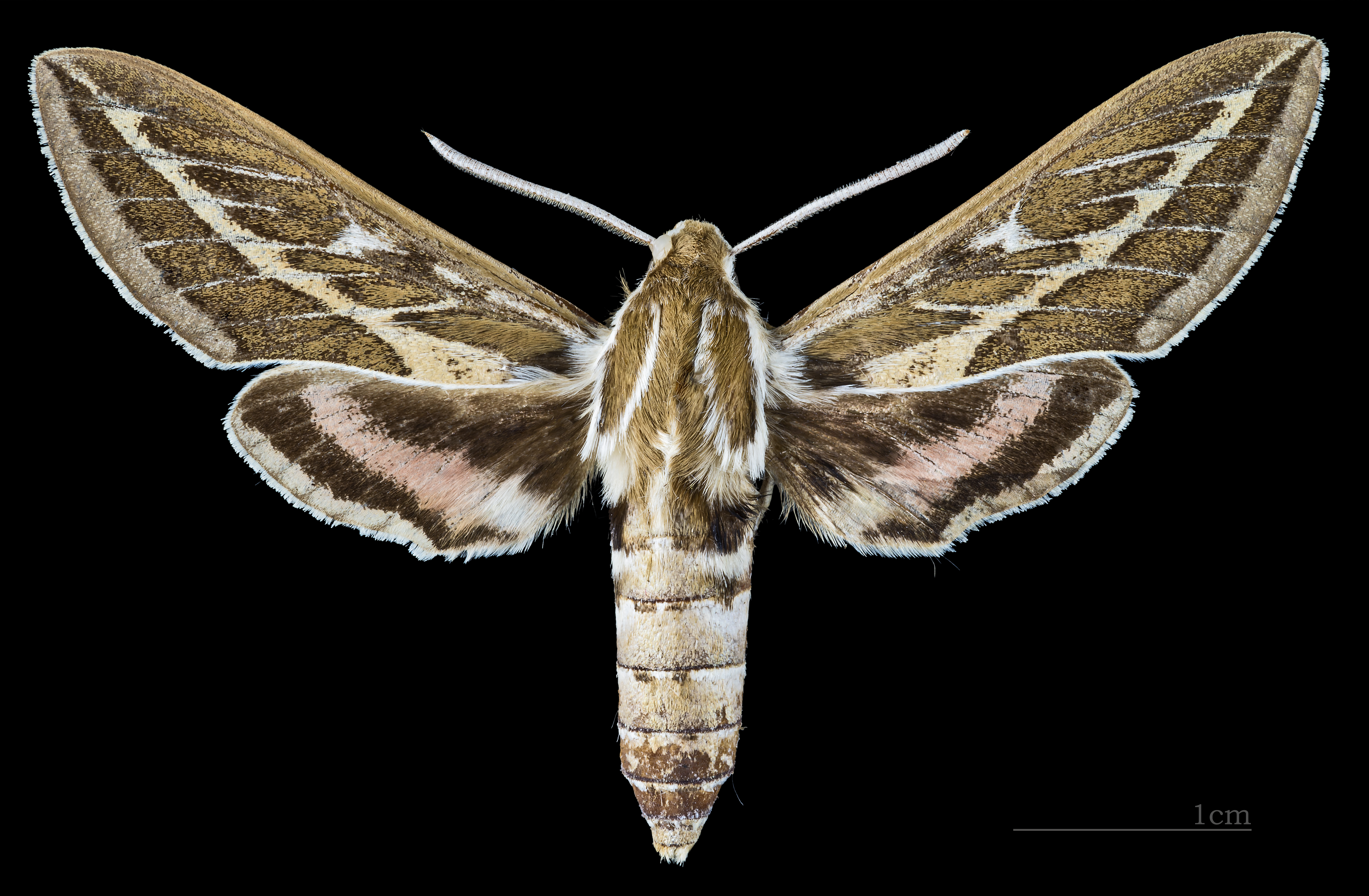
Male dorsal view

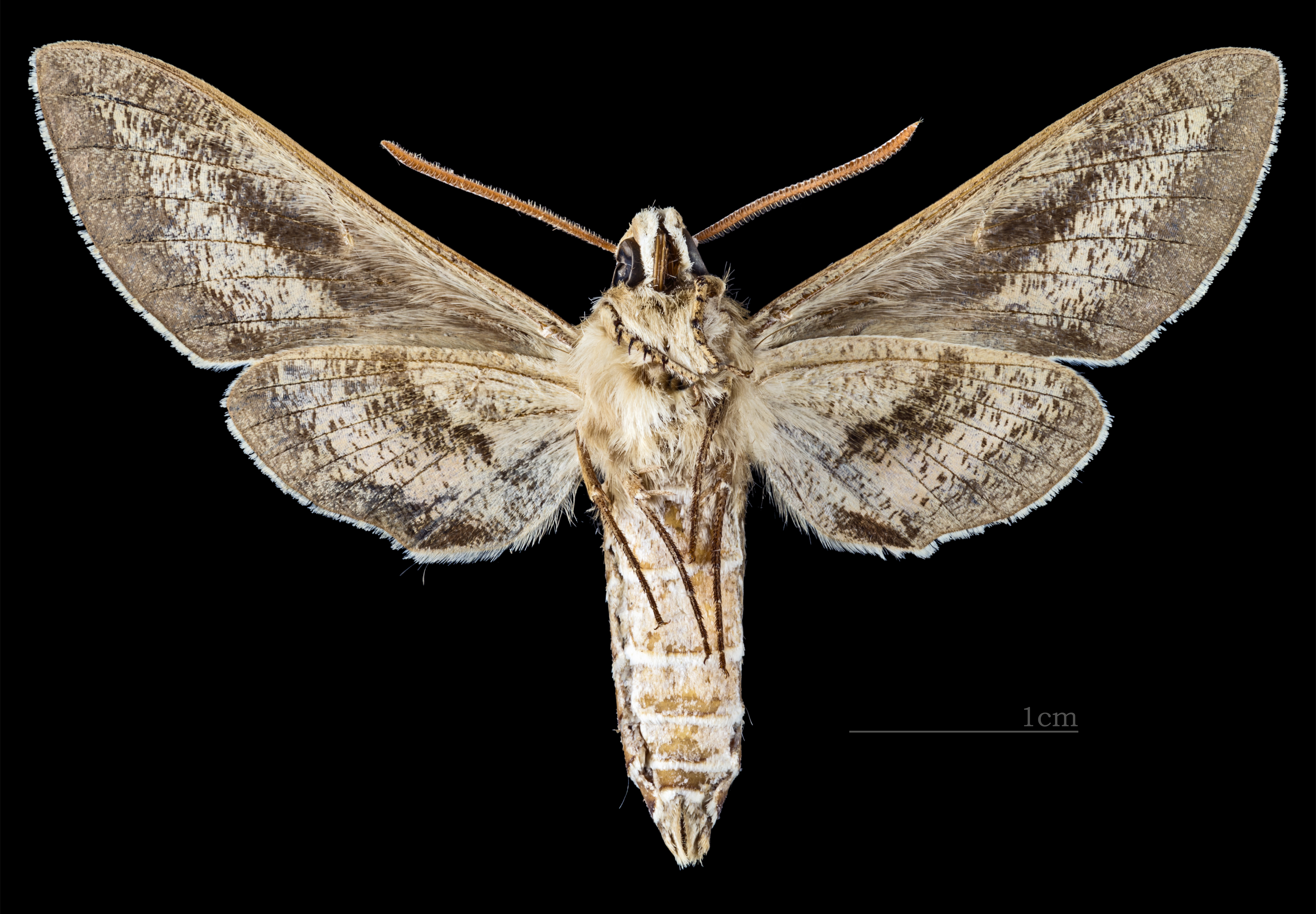
Male ventral view

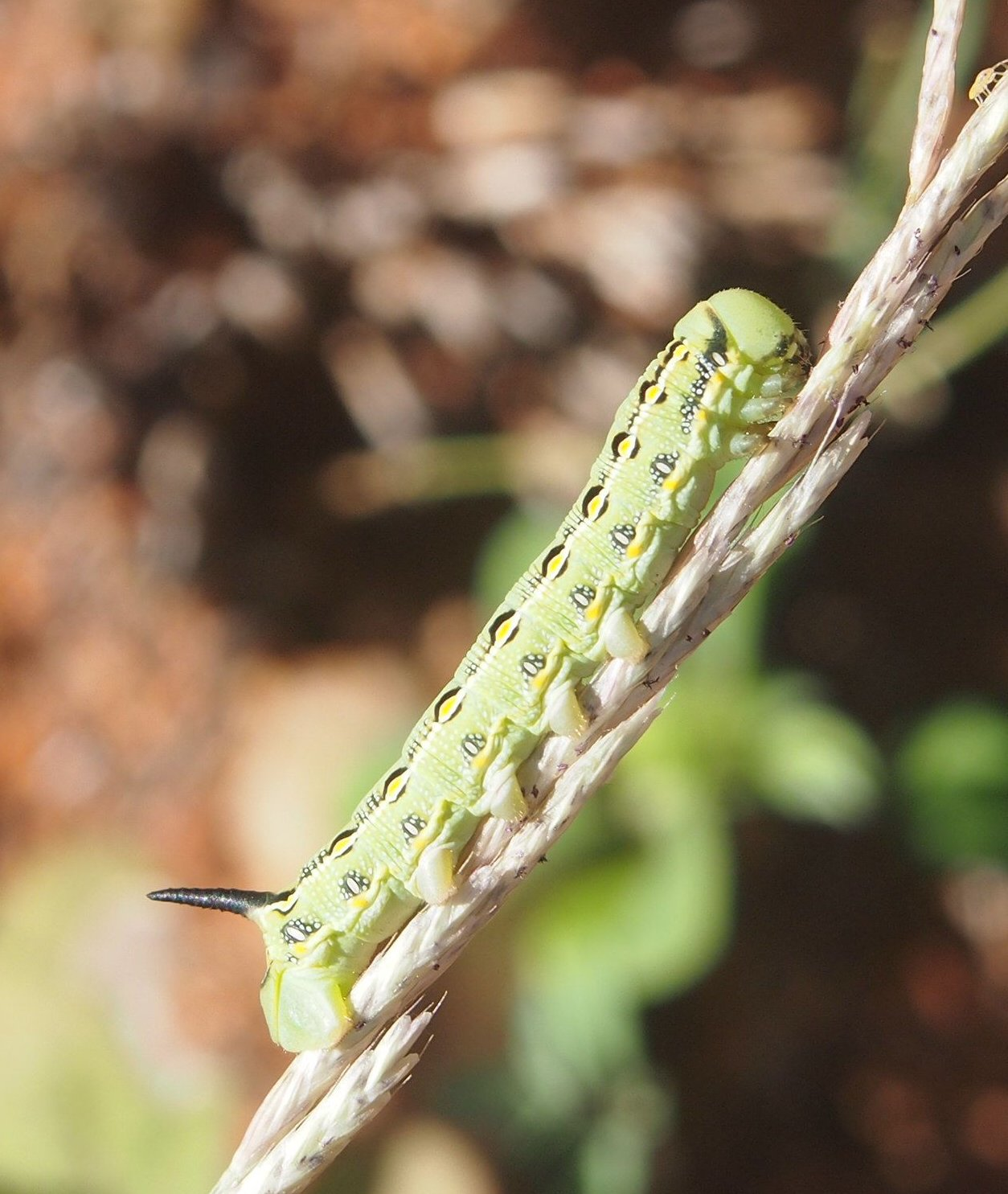
Caterpillar

== Habitat ==
The Arrente people associate H. livornicoides with certain plant taxa, such as tarvine (Boerhavia diffusa and B. schomburgkiana), emu bush (Eremophila longifolia) and pink rockwort (Sedopsis filsonii), due to the plants role in providing forage and habitat for the caterpillar.

== Diet ==
The caterpillars have been reported to feed on:

- Roly-poly (Salsola kali),
- Tar Vine (Boerhavia coccinea),
- Purslane (Portulaca oleracea),
- Grape Vine (Vitis vinifera),
- Caltrop (Tribulus terrestris).
