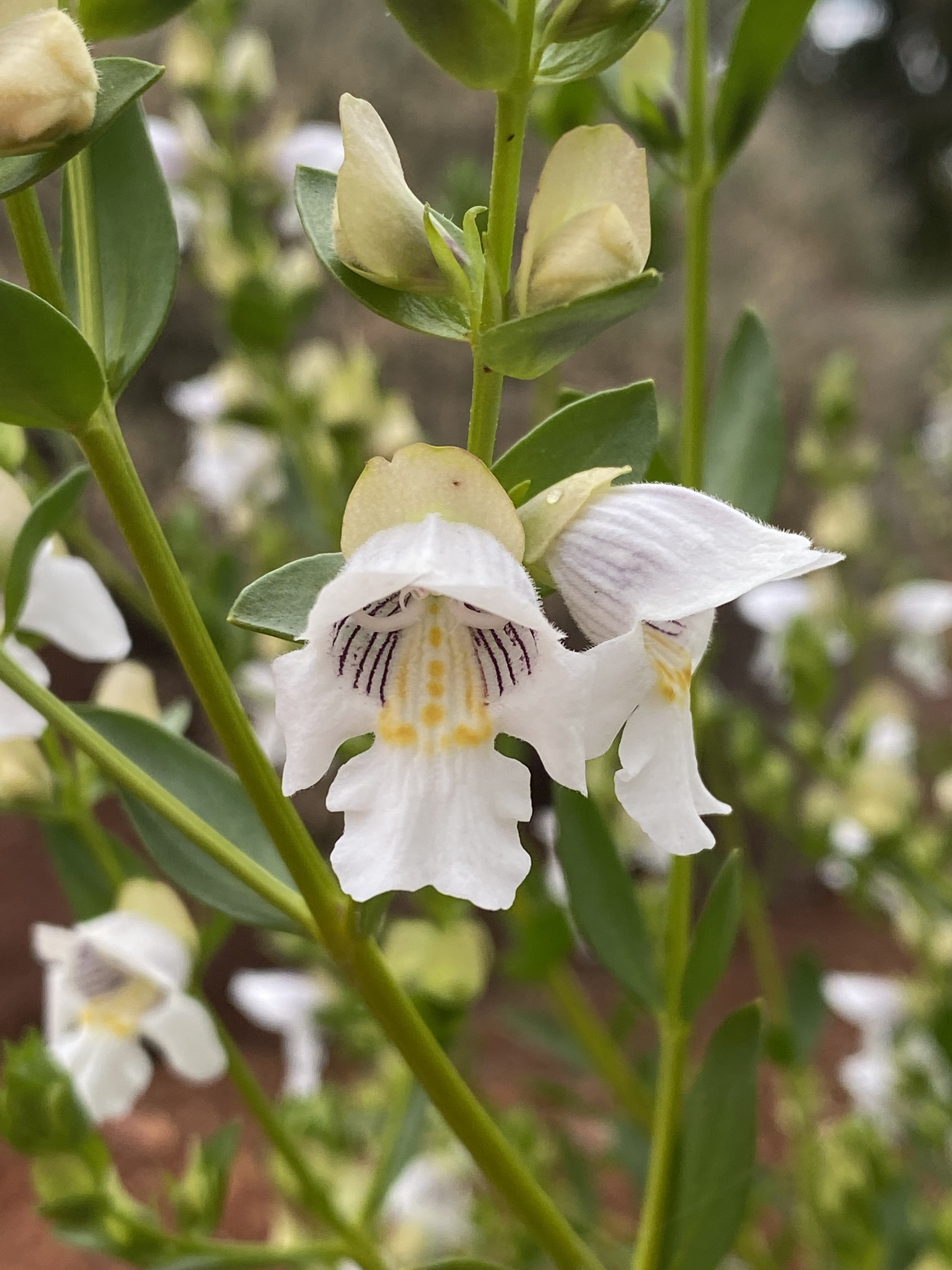
- In the Mount Annan Botanic Garden

Scientific classification
- Kingdom: Plantae
- Clade: Tracheophytes
- Clade: Angiosperms
- Clade: Eudicots
- Clade: Asterids
- Order: Lamiales
- Family: Lamiaceae
- Genus: Prostanthera
- Species: P. striatiflora

Binomial name
- Prostanthera striatiflora F.Muell.
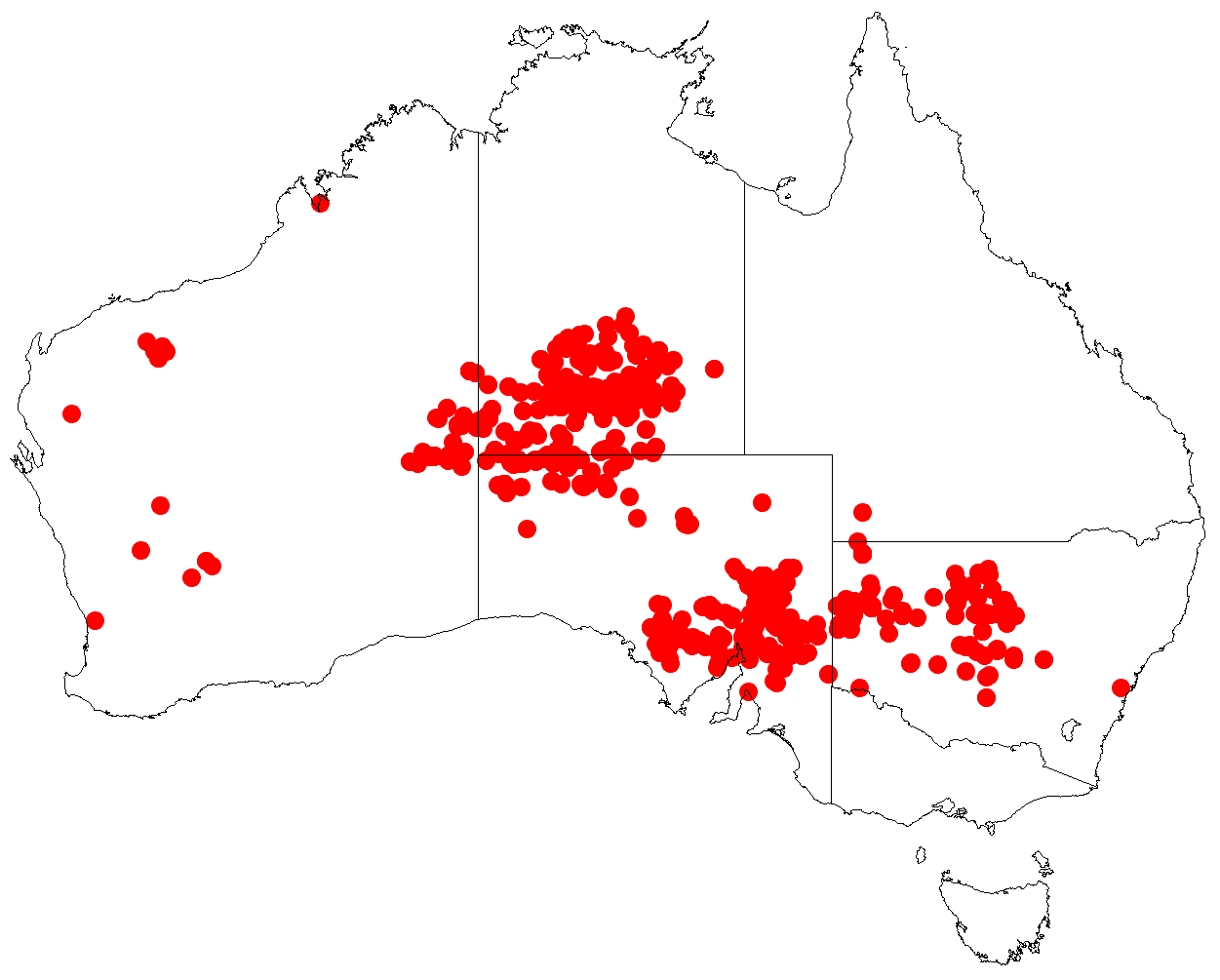
- Occurrence data from AVH

Synonyms
- Prostanthera striatiflora F.Muell. var. striatiflora; Prostanthera sullivaniae Benth. nom. inval., pro syn.

= Prostanthera striatiflora =

Jockey's cap

Species of plant

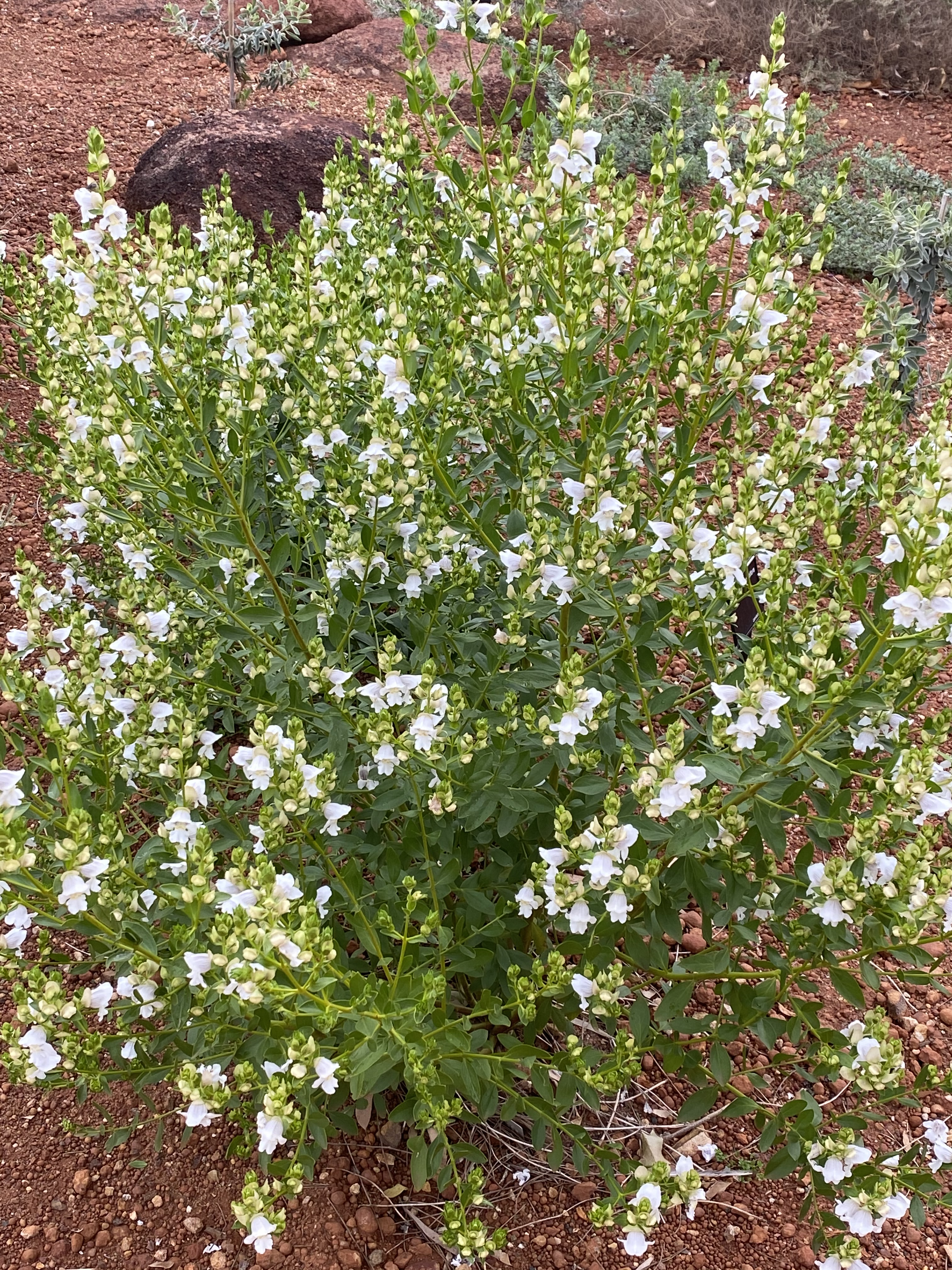
Habit

Prostanthera striatiflora, commonly known as jockey's cap, striated mintbush or striped mintbush, is a species of flowering plant that is endemic to the more arid areas of Australia. It is an erect, aromatic shrub with narrow egg-shaped to narrow elliptic leaves and white flowers with purple lines inside the petal tube.

== Description ==
Prostanthera striatiflora is an erect, aromatic shrub that typically grows to a height of 0.5–2 m (1 ft 8 in – 6 ft 7 in) and has only sparsely hairy branches. The leaves are narrow egg-shaped to narrow elliptic, 8–39 mm (0.31–1.54 in) long, 2–10 mm (0.079–0.394 in) wide, mostly glabrous and sessile or on a petiole up to 1 mm (0.039 in) long. The flowers are arranged in groups of four to about twelve near the ends of branchlets, each flower on a pedicel 1.3–2.3 mm (0.051–0.091 in) long. The sepals are light green, often with a faint purple tinge and form a tube 2.5–3.4 mm (0.098–0.134 in) long with two lobes, 2.3–3.9 mm (0.091–0.154 in) long. The petals are white, 10–17 mm (0.39–0.67 in) long, forming a tube 10.3–11.4 mm (0.41–0.45 in) long with purple lines inside. The middle lower lobe is spatula-shaped, 6.5–10 mm (0.26–0.39 in) long and 8.5–9 mm (0.33–0.35 in) wide and the side lobes are 5–8.5 mm (0.20–0.33 in) long. The upper lip is 5.5–10.5 mm (0.22–0.41 in) long and 8.5–13.8 mm (0.33–0.54 in) wide with a central notch 3–4.5 mm (0.12–0.18 in) deep. Flowering occurs from July to November.

== Taxonomy ==
Prostanthera striatiflora was first formally described in 1853 by Ferdinand von Mueller in Linnaea: ein Journal für die Botanik in ihrem ganzen Umfange, oder Beiträge zur Pflanzenkunde based on plant specimens that he collected during his 1851 expedition through the Flinders Ranges in South Australia.

== Distribution and habitat ==
Jockey's cap occurs in arid areas of New South Wales, Queensland, Western Australia, South Australia and the Northern Territory where it grows in woodland in rocky, dry terrain.

== Use in horticulture ==
The species is cultivated for its showy flowers and aromatic foliage. It prefers a well-drained situation in full sun or partial shade and tolerates both dryness and frost. It is suited to cultivation in large containers.
