= Rona Glynn =

Aboriginal Australian school teacher and nurse (1936–1965)

- Born: 24 September 1936; Woodgreen Station, Northern Territory
- Died: 4 January 1965 (aged 28)
- Years active: 1950–1964
- Known for: First Indigenous teacher and nurse in NT, Australia
- Parents: Ron Price (Note: According to 1940 letter from R. H. Purvis of Wood Green Station, Central Australia, to the Minister of the Interior about Topsy Glynn: "I would explain that this girl [Topsy] is the daughter of James Glynn, halfcaste and a lubra... Glynn some years ago took Mr F R W Scott to Oodnadatta from Stirling Station for medical aid, while on the trip (by buggy approx 1919) his lubra (the mother of Topsy) was killed by the blacks, and Glynn gave the girl to bring up as it was almost impossible for him to do so in his nomadic job of stockman. In due course I prevailed upon the late Commissioner of Police R Stott to let the girl go to the institution, this he allowed although the girl is not a half-caste, conditionally that I took her out and gave her a job on the station when she had finished schooling. This I did, and the girl remained here with quarters of her own. In 1936 the girl gave birth to a child and stated that Ron Price was the father, this fact was admitted by Price, later I reported the birth and M C Muldoon came here on the case. In 1939, another child was born to her and Alf Price, brother of the father of her first child was the father. This birth was reported. I had occasion to take the girl wit her second child to the doctor and then after all the years, it was deemed fit to put her back in the institution... etc.) (father); Topsy Glynn (mother)
- Relatives: Freda Glynn (half-sister); Erica Glynn (niece); Warwick Thornton (nephew)

Rona Ellen Glynn (24 September 1936 – 4 January 1965), also known briefly as Rona Schaber after marriage, was the first Indigenous Australian school teacher and nurse in Alice Springs in the Northern Territory. In 1965 she became the first Indigenous woman to have a pre-school named in her honour in Australia.

== Early life and family ==
Rona Ellen Glynn was born on 24 September 1936 at Wood Green Station in Central Australia, the daughter of Ron Price and Topsy Glynn, a housemaid and cook for Robert Henry Purvis (Bob Purvis Sr), owner of Woodgreen Station. (Note: ...and had also done stockwork and windmill repair work around the station and in return had only received clothing and rations.)

Rona's mother, Topsy Glynn, was born around 1916, the daughter of a "half-caste" stockman called James Glynn and an unnamed Aboriginal woman. She was later described by the authorities as a "three-quarter-caste aboriginal". After Topsy's mother was killed, around 1919, Ron Purvis Sr persuaded the NT police commissioner Robert Stott to put Topsy in to the "Half-caste Institution Alice Springs" (The Bungalow, then at the Alice Springs Telegraph Station), although she was not technically "half-caste", on condition that Purvis employed her on Woodgreen Station as soon as she had completed her schooling there, which he did. Glynn gave birth to two daughters on Atartinga /Wood Green. The first of these was Rona, born in 1936, whose father was Ron Price. Rona's half-sister, whose father was Rona's father's brother, Alf Price, was the photographer and media specialist who co-founded CAAMA, Freda Glynn, born in 1939. They are both granddaughters of Isobelle Violet Price (Hesketh), the first lone woman to run a station, after her husband Fred, telegraph master of Alice Springs Telegraph Station, had died.

Following the bombing of Darwin in February 1942, there were military orders to evacuate The Bungalow, so Topsy went to find work on a farm in New South Wales with her girls. However bad circumstances there caused her to leave, and she was taken in by a couple in the Sydney suburb of Vaucluse as a domestic. Freda stayed with her, while the Church Missionary Society helped to place Rona at an Anglican home at Mulgoa, west of Sydney, where Freda later joined her. In late May 1942 a number of other children from The Bungalow were escorted to Mulgoa via Adelaide (and possibly Melbourne as well). (Note: John Kundereri Moriarty was also evacuated to this place from Roper River when he was four years old, although apparently did not stay at The Bungalow first.)

== Education ==
In 1949, the sisters were placed in St. Mary's Hostel in Alice Springs, under the care of Sister Eileen Heath; during her time here she attended school at Hartley Street School. St Mary's was run by the Australian Board of Missions, and provided accommodation and schooling for Aboriginal children who had been either placed there by their parents or by the Director of Native Affairs. Several returning evacuees were placed there after the war.

In September 1950, Rona wrote an article for the Centralian Advocate about the moving and redecoration of some classrooms at her school.

Glynn did well at school, and gained her Intermediate Certificate in four subjects at Alice Springs Higher Primary School around 1951, a feat achieved by very few Aboriginal children at the time.

== Career ==
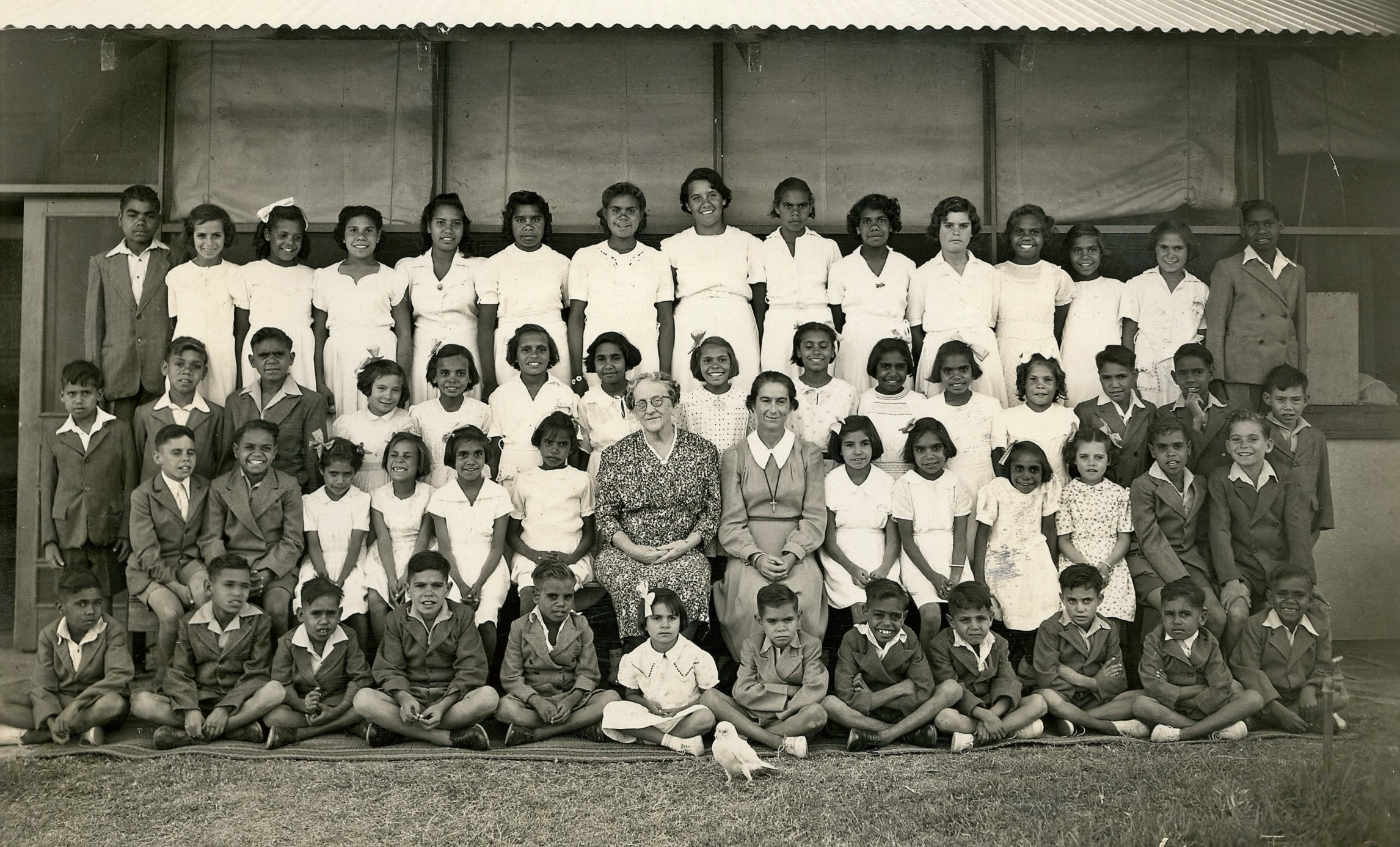
At St Mary's hostel in Alice Springs (c. 1950s); tallest girl in the back row is Rona Glynn, with sister Freda Glynn to the viewer's left

The accompanying photo shows Rona – the tallest girl in the back row – and sister Erica, to her right (viewer's left) during this time. In 1953, both Freda and Rona are listed as wards of the N.A.B., with Freda a school student while Rona was employed in Alice Springs.

At the age of 16, she became the first Aboriginal school teacher in Central Australia. In 1952 Glynn was appointed by the South Australian Department of Education as junior teacher at Hartley Street School, taking charge of a Grade 2 class.

In 1954, Glynn moved to Melbourne to train as a nurse. She undertook general training at the Melbourne School of Nursing, graduating in 1957. She gained a triple nursing certificate. The following year she undertook midwifery training at the Royal Women's Hospital, Melbourne, where after completing the year-long course she remained on staff, becoming a charge sister.

In 1962 Glynn returned to Alice Springs, where she became the first Aboriginal Charge Sister (Maternity Ward) at the Alice Springs Hospital. She delivered around 2000 babies. She was known for taking grapefruit from the garden of the matron's quarters and distributing them among the new mothers on the ward. Annoyed, the matron stormed the ward asking whether anyone knew what was happening to the fruit. Glynn apparently placed her finger to her lips indicating the mothers to be quiet. When the matron left, they continued eating the grapefruit.

== Death and legacy ==
In 1964 Glynn married pastoralist Bill Schaber. She died the following year after complications from childbirth, on 4 January 1965.

A pre-school located at Ross Park Primary School was named Rona Glynn Preschool after her in 1965. She was the first Aboriginal woman to have a pre-school named in her honour in Australia. Over 100 people attended the opening in September 1965.
