= Hartley Street School =

Museum and former school in Alice Springs, Australia

Coordinates: 23.6999°S 133.8814°E

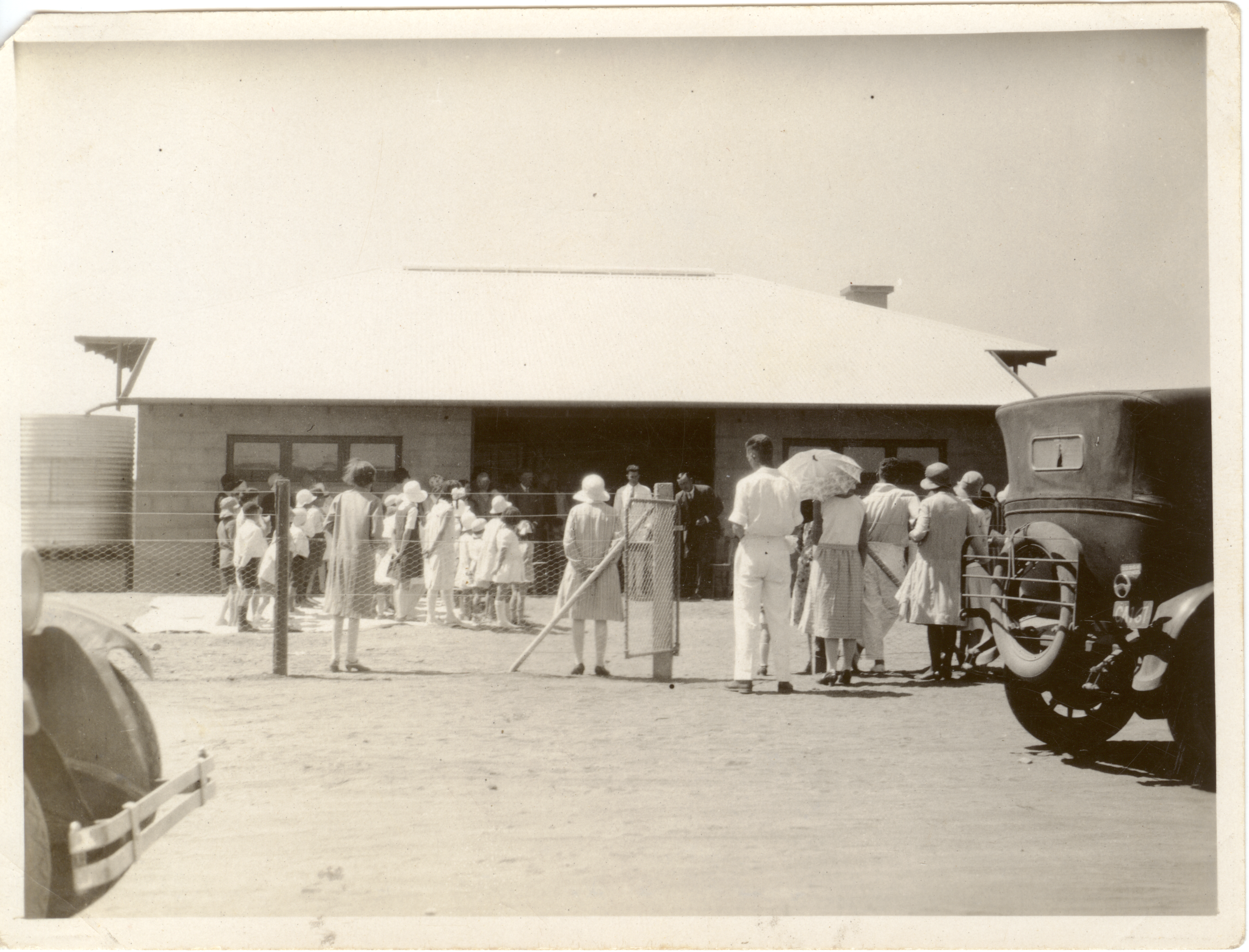
The opening of Hartley Street School, 1930

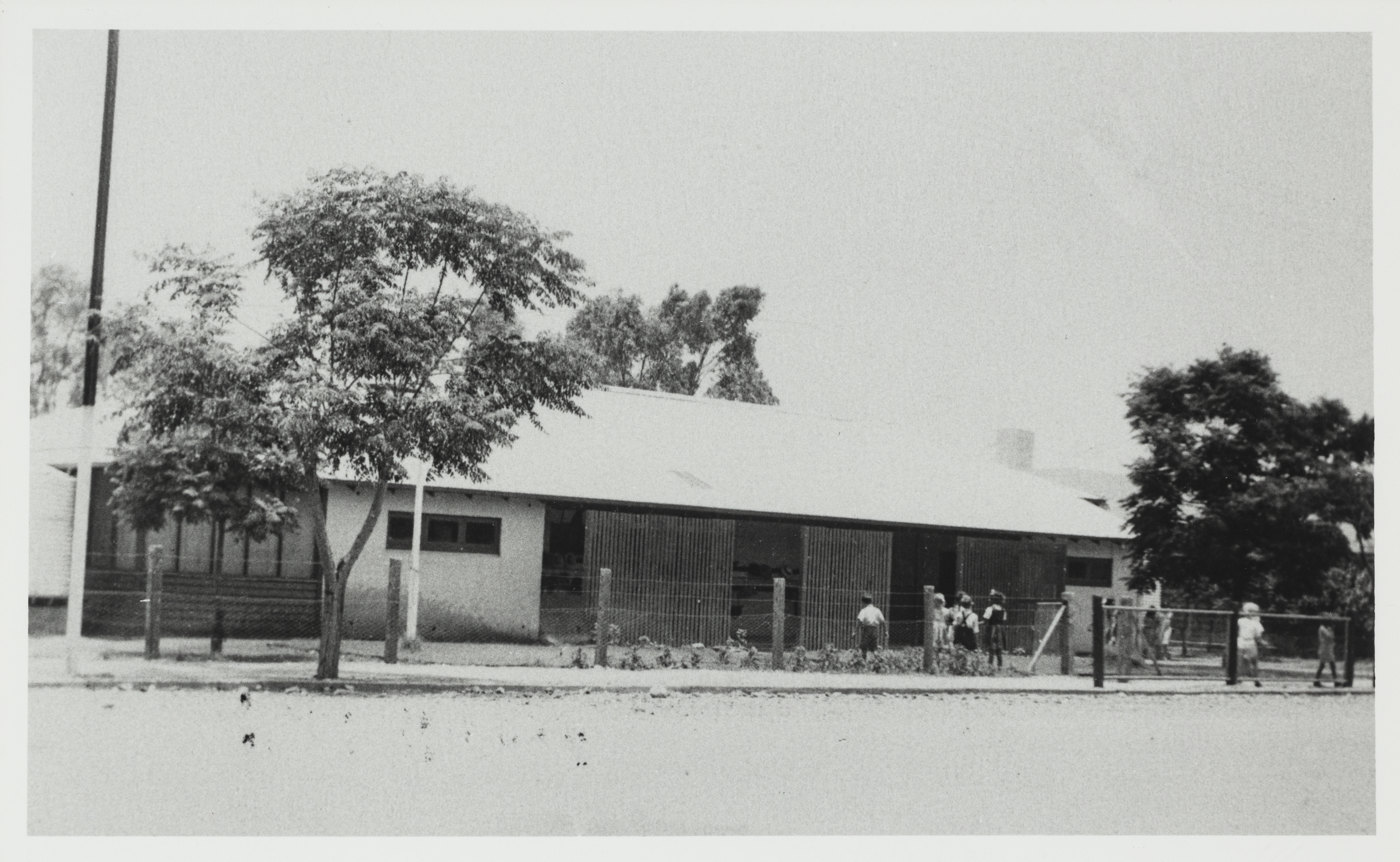
Hartley Street School, 1944

The school in 1984

Hartley Street School in Alice Springs (formerly Stuart), Northern Territory, Australia, was the first purpose-built school in the town. Its oldest buildings were constructed in 1929, and it opened in 1930 to cater for the growing population in the town following the completion of the railway line from Adelaide to Alice Springs.

== Background ==
The official opening of the Hartley Street School was on 26 February 1930 by the government resident of the day, Victor Carrington, and Pearl Burton was the first teacher appointed.

In 1945 a new kindergarten, in a unique octagonal shape, was built, designed by B.C.G. Burnett.

Its students included those living at St. Mary's Hostel, a Stolen Generations institution, who were bussed in each day. After World War II it also schooled the mostly 'European' students living at Griffiths House which was then next door.

The School of the Air started teaching its first students from here on 20 September 1950, when the first broadcast was made. The first teacher employed from the School of the Air, while at Hartley Street School, was Molly Ferguson, later Mary Myrtle Healy who worked there until 1956 when she married and was forced to resign. The broadcast from the school was monitored from the Royal Flying Doctor Service base in Alice Springs, and they assisted in relaying the transmission. The lessons were broadcast from the verandah of the school and, later, a section of the staff room was enclosed to create a studio. Neither of these locations were ideal as acoustics were poor and background noise from the active classroom could be heard.

The school closed in 1965, and in 1988 it became a museum, which is operated by the National Trust (Northern Territory).

== Heritage protection ==
The school buildings are listed on the Northern Territory Heritage Register with a permanent declaration being made on 19 August 1998.

It was previously included on the now defunct Register of the National Estate having been listed there on 1 November 1983.

== Notable people ==
The following notable people were associated with the school, each of these people attended the school via St. Mary's Hostel:

- Freda Glynn; a former pupil and co-founder of the Central Australian Aboriginal Media Association.
- Rona Glynn; a former pupil and head prefect who was later appointed as a teacher; she was one of the first Aboriginal Australian school teachers in Australia.
- Tony Liddle; a former pupil and truck driver/tour guide.
