= Woodgreen Station =

Cattle station in the Northern Territory of Australia

Coordinates: 19°03′28″S 136°42′28″E

Location in Northern Territory

Woodgreen Station, also spelt Wood Green and also known as Atartinga, is a cattle station located in the Northern Territory of Australia, to the northeast of Alice Springs, extending approximately 2,215 km^{2} (855 sq mi). It was also known as (Mer) Athatheng by some of the Indigenous people in the area.

The first lessee of the pastoral lease created in 1918 was Bob Purvis Sr, who first ran it as a sheep station and bred horses, before introducing cattle. The property was very degraded by the time his son, Bob Purvis Jr, took it over in 1960, mainly due to overstocking. Since then, Bob Jr has slowly rejuvenated the property, making it a viable concern, albeit with much lower stocking rates of cattle, by applying some of the techniques of regenerative agriculture and developing his own methods to improve the soil.

== History ==
=== Before European settlement ===
Wood Green Station was established across the land of two Aboriginal groups, most of it on that of the Anmatyerre, with the eastern border flanking the lands of the Alyawarre people. It has been referred to as Athatheng by Aboriginal people. Before European settlement, the land had not been exposed to grazing animals with hard, cloven hoofs.

=== Robert Henry (Bob) Purvis, c. 1885–1965 ===
Robert Henry (Bob) Purvis Sr had come out from Scotland and took the lease of Woodgreen Station in 1924 and operated it until 1960.

=== James Robert Purvis (Bob Purvis Jr), from 1960 ===
Bob Purvis Jr was born on the property in 1937, and went to boarding school in Adelaide, South Australia. His father had got into huge debt by the time he took over ownership in 1960, largely due to land degradation caused by poor grazing practices. This was partly due to the conditions of the least, which stated that thea minimum stocking rate was 3000 head for the property. The debts exceeded the property's value, and three quarters of the land was unusable.

Bob Jr worked slowly over decades to improve the soil to make the property sustainable, using some methods which he had developed himself to reverse the damage. He has practised regenerative agriculture, which included measures such as reducing stock numbers (he estimated that a sustainable number is about 400) and building banks to slow the flow of water and trap the topsoil. These ponding banks have become commonly referred to as "Purvis banks". His labours have borne fruit, and perennial grasses have returned to the property, with topsoil in much better condition and more fertile. He has used fire for land management, adapted from Indigenous fire-stick farming, and sites once dominated by mulga have been transformed into open ghost gum grassland with many species of grasses and forbs, which offer better nutrition for cattle. By 1985 he had paid off the debts, and was able to sell livestock in a hard season. He also improved the fencing, and introduced solar power and batteries to provide for its energy needs. Working with his wife, Marie, he has worked with fire for decades. This, along with ponding banks and lower stocking, had drought-proofed the property and improved productivity. He has also managed to keep buffel grass under control.

Purvis got advice from scientists, government representatives and others. However there was no one single answer; it was through his own experimentation that he found the best ways to improve his land, being unique in its own way. He used observation and his analytical skills to hone his methods. He believes that regulators' initial recommended stocking rate was three times higher than what he considers appropriate for long-term carrying capacity of Woodgreen. His property is manageable and productive, as well as being stable financially, with a productive herd and few stock losses. A 2021 article calls him a pioneer of the model of sustainably low stocking rates and maintaining high-quality beef, which caused him to be ostracised by some in the cattle industry.

The introduction of native title in Australia in 1993 also led to a change in the relationship between the Aboriginal workers and the Purvis family.

=== 21st century ===
Bob's son Jim has co-managed the property since some time before 2015.

In March 2020, anthropologists' work was under way on both Woodgreen and Mount Skinner pastoral leases as the basis for any future native title claims, under the auspices of the Central Land Council. By 30 June 2021, the research had progressed.

== Property location and description ==
Woodgreen Station, also known as Atartinga, covers approximately 2,215 km^{2} (855 sq mi), and is located around 140 km (87 mi) north of Alice Springs, on the Sandover Highway. The homestead is known as Atartinga, and is in the locality of Anmatjere, local government area Central Desert Region. It lies within the Simpson Desert.

Atartinga is a subregion of Burt Plain, an interim Australian bioregion.

== Woodgreen Conservation Reserve ==
Woodgreen Conservation Reserve is an NT protected area, under the Territory Parks and Wildlife Conservation Act 1976 of about 92,665 ha (228,980 acres), or 927.09 km^{2} (357.95 sq mi). Designated in 2014, the park is an IUCN Management Category V park.

There has been some mineral exploration in the park, as recently as 2021.

The reserve straddles the Sandover Highway, with most of it on the western side. Its northeast corner is close to Atartinga homestead.

== 1935 plane emergency landing ==
On 6 September 1935, a General Aircraft Monospar ST-12 operated by Australian Transcontinental Airways (ATA) (Note: ATA was a short-lived airline, registered in Melbourne in 1935 by Harold Berryman of Ballarat with four other directors. Its three aeroplanes did the mail run from Darwin to Adelaide, Melbourne and Sydney, until the airline ceased operations in 1936, owing to the impossibility of importing more planes from Germany at that time.) suffered engine failure, and made an emergency landing on Woodgreen Station. Reports vary slightly, but the plane was said to have been carrying the pilot J. Maher, with two passengers, Renfrey and Maloney, and a young crocodile that was being transported to Adelaide. (Note: One later report says the destination was Melbourne Zoo.)

Renfrey walked for two days towards Ryan's Well, a watering hole on the Overland Telegraph Line, a distance of around 40 mi (64 km), to seek assistance. He was found by three men (one of several search parties sent out to look for the plane) who were driving across the desert, and they took him to Aileron telegraph station. In the meantime, Don Thomas, from Alice Springs, drove to Woodgreen to pick up Purvis Sr and two "blackfellows", one of whom managed to track down the plane, based on the description of the location given by Renfrey. Maher and Maloney had only six oranges between them for food, but they survived by shooting and eating the crocodile.

== Other people ==
Topsy Glynn was born around 1916, the daughter of a "half-caste" stockman called James Glynn and an unnamed Aboriginal woman. She was later described by the authorities as a "three-quarter-caste aboriginal". After Topsy's mother was killed, around 1919, Ron Purvis Sr persuaded the NT police commissioner Robert Stott to put Topsy in to the "Half-caste Institution Alice Springs" (The Bungalow, then at the Alice Springs Telegraph Station), although she was not technically "half-caste", on condition that Purvis employed her on Wood Green Station as soon as she had completed her schooling there, which he did. Glynn gave birth to two daughters on Atartinga /Wood Green. The first of these daughters was Rona Glynn, born in 1936, whose father was Ron Price. She went on to become the first Aboriginal teacher and nurse in Alice Springs. The second daughter was Freda Glynn, born in 1939, whose father was Ron's brother Alf Price. Freda became a media specialist, who co-founded the Central Australian Aboriginal Media Association, and is the mother of filmmaker Erica Glynn.

Topsy was again admitted to The Bungalow on 12 Sept 1939, When Freda was just three weeks old, as there were health issues to be attended to, the authorities were trying to determine who Freda's father was, and owing to "the promiscuous manner in which Topsy was giving birth to half-caste infants at Wood Green station it was...considered to be in the girls best interests for her and her children to remain in the Institution". Topsy was not keen to return to the station, as she was employed by Purvis "as housemaid and cook and had also done stockwork and windmill repair work around the station and in return had only received clothing and rations", and was happy working as a laundress at the institution. However, by November 1940, Topsy was again working for Purvis at Wood Green under an agreement similar to that which governed the employment of half-caste girls in the township. Following the bombing of Darwin in February 1942, there were military orders to evacuate The Bungalow, so Topsy took her girls to New South Wales to find work there.

Artist and cultural leader, Anmatyerr woman Hilda "Cookie" Price Pwerl (c. 1930–2019), worked for rations at Woodgreen (known to her as Athatheng) and other stations in the area when she was young.

Lorna Petyarr Purvis, who married Alexander Donald (Pwerle) Ross (1915–1999; known as Don) in 1938, was Bob Purvis Sr's niece, and they met at Woodgreen. She was a "half-caste" Western Arrernte woman, who had had a hard life, growing up in The Bungalow. Don Ross was a senior Kaytetye man, who owned a cattle station called Neutral Junction Station, near the Barrow Creek Telegraph Station, between 1947 and 1952.

J. R. Purvis was another son of Bob Purvis Sr.
