= Sonny Morey =

Personal information
- Full name: Sonny Morey
- Born: 1945 (age 80–81); Yambah Station, Northern Territory, Australia
- Original team: Gawler Centrals
- Position: Wing / Half-back

Playing career^{1}
Years	Club	Games (Goals)
1964–1977	Central District	213 (28)

Representative team honours
Years	Team	Games (Goals)
	South Australia	4

Coaching career
Years	Club	Games (W–L–D)
1981–1988	Central District U17	
- ^{1} Playing statistics correct to the end of 1977.

Sonny Morey (born 1945) is an Aboriginal Australian former Australian rules footballer. He played for Central District in the South Australian National Football League (SANFL). He was removed from his family in the Northern Territory as part of the Stolen Generations, first placed in a home in Alice Springs, and transferred to Adelaide as a young teenager.

== Early life and education ==
Sonny Morey was born in 1945 on Yambah Station in the Northern Territory of Australia, An Arrernte man, he was removed from his family as part of the Stolen Generations at the age of seven.

Morey spent part of his childhood at St Mary’s Hostel in Alice Springs, where he lived for six years before being transferred in 1958 St Francis House, a home for Aboriginal boys in the Adelaide beachside suburb of Semaphore, run by Church of England missionaries. With him at the home were Charlie Perkins (later an Aboriginal rights activist), Harold Thomas (who later designed the Aboriginal flag), and artist and soccer player John Kundereri Moriarty. His surname was changed from Gorey to Morey by authorities.

A year later, St Francis House closed down, and he was fostered out to a family at the age of 14. His foster parents were Ada and Sydney Maguire. He began playing junior football with Gawler Centrals, one of three clubs comprising Gawler Football Club in Gawler, South Australia. There he won under-17 and senior best-and-fairest awards.

== Playing career ==
Morey's Australian rules football career developed with the Gawler Central Football Club in the Gawler and District Football Association. During his time at the club, he played alongside fellow Indigenous footballer Merv Rigney.

Morey won Gawler Central's A Grade Best and Fairest award in 1961 and 1962. In 1963, he played in the club's grand final team, which was defeated by South Gawler Football Club by 15 points..

Morey played a total of 213 senior games for Central District in the SANFL between 1964 and 1977.

He made his senior debut in Central District's inaugural SANFL season in 1964 and recorded the club’s first league kick.

Morey won Central's Best and Fairest award in 1970. He was runner-up in the 1972 Magarey Medal and received both Central District and SANFL player life memberships.

He became the first Central District player to reach 200 games in 1976. He retired the following year, finishing with 213 appearances and 28 goals.

During his career, he represented South Australia in four interstate matches.

== Coaching and later career ==
After retiring, Morey coached Eudunda Football Club from 1978 to 1980, guiding them to a premiership in 1978.

He later coached Central District’s under-17s between 1981 and 1988, including their 1985 premiership.

Outside football, Morey worked as a fitter and turner, storeman, and sports store manager. He also served for 12 years with South Australia Police, where he worked in community engagement roles.

== Honours and recognition ==
- Inducted into the South Australian Football Hall of Fame (2023)
- Inducted into the Central District Hall of Fame
- Central District Best and Fairest: 1970
- First Central District player to 200 games
- Named in the SANFL Indigenous Team of the Century (2011)
- Honoured in the AFL’s 2024 Sir Doug Nicholls Round
- Featured in AFL.com.au article: "Fall and rise: The incredible story of SA footy great Sonny Morey" (2024)
- Profiled in The Advertiser on life, legacy and racism in South Australian football (2024)

== Personal life ==
Morey married Carmel, and they have two daughters. His daughter, Kim Morey-Hure, has spoken publicly about his experiences and the continuing impact of the Stolen Generations.

He never saw his mother again despite looking for her all of his life, but later discovered that she had also searched for him after his removal, until her death in 1992. After learning of her death, he had been unable to find where she had been buried. In early 2026, shortly before the 18th anniversary of the National Apology to the Stolen Generations (13 February), Morey was at last informed that her burial site was on Napperby Station, north-west of Alice Springs. At his first attendance of a breakfast gathering in Canberra to mark the anniversary, he met other survivors of the Stolen Generations, including four of his "sisters" who had lived at St Mary's Hostel when he was there as a child.
