= St. Mary's Hostel (Alice Springs) =

Australian mission hostel (1947–1972)

Coordinates: 23.74762833°S 133.8734187°E

St. Mary's Hostel, formerly Mount Blatherskite Hostel (1946–47), commonly known simply as St Mary's, was an Australian Board of Missions hostel in Alice Springs from 1947 to 1972. Its residents were mostly Aboriginal children, including many who were a part of the Stolen Generations. In 1972, coming under new management, it was renamed St Mary's Children's Village (1972–1980).

== History ==
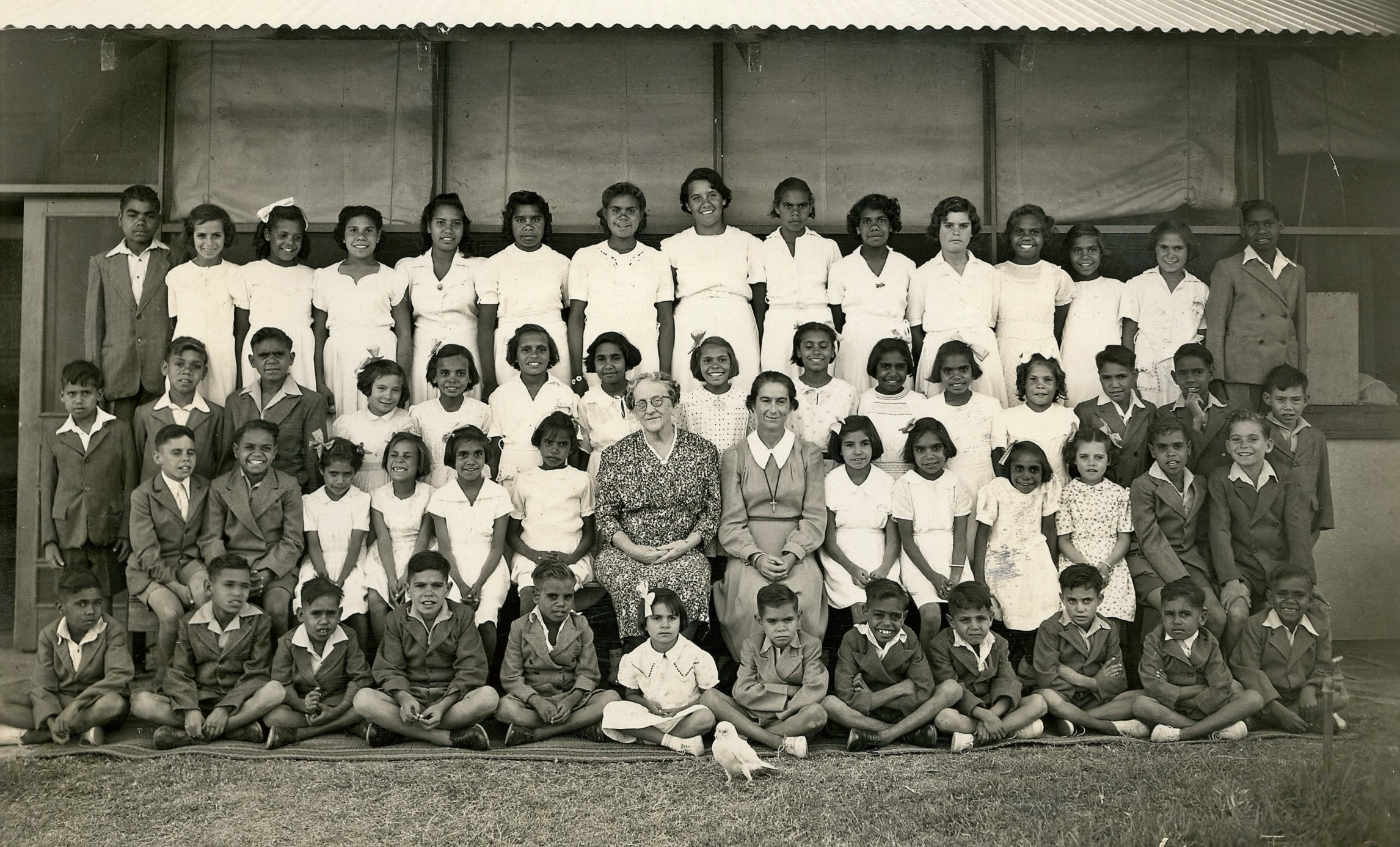
Residents at St Mary's Hostel c. 1950s

St. Mary's Hostel was built on the site of the Lady Gowrie Rest Home for Service Women, which was in operation during World War II, located on the Stuart Highway, just south of Alice Springs. Following the war it was purchased cheaply by the Australian Board of Missions, after higher tenders had been received for the property, and named St. Mary's Church of England Hostel (most often simply referred to as St. Mary's).

From 1947 to 1972, it was, in part, an institute for "half-caste" (part-Aboriginal) children (taken as wards of state under the Aboriginals Ordinance 1918), and the hostel played an important role in creating the Stolen Generations in Central Australia. Not all of the residents of the hostel were taken from their families; the hostel also accommodated many Aboriginal children from more remote parts of the region whose families paid for their stay there.

The first superintendent of the hostel, Sister Eileen Heath, arrived in Alice Springs with her friend, Lillian Schroder, who would serve as the housekeeper and seamstress. They welcomed their first residents on 2 March 1946, four children (two girls and two boys) from Newcastle Waters Station and from there the numbers continued to grow. Eight months later there were 18 children.

In January 1949, a major event in the life of the hostel was Heath travelling to Mulgoa NSW, to "bring back" some of the women and children who had been evacuated there during the war (1942). Heath made the return journey with Rona and Freda Glynn and their mother Topsy, and seven other girls or women, while three chose to remain in NSW. These children were all wards of the state, under Mr Moy of the Native Affairs Branch.

In 1953 film director Charles Chauvel visited St. Mary's (for the second time) during an exhaustive search for his lead and "discovered" Ngarla Kunoth (Rosalie Kunoth-Monks) who he cast as the title role in Jedda.

Records are available of all residents of St. Mary's in 1953 that give an "undated list of inmates", with 71 school students and six "working girls" listed; women who worked in Alice Springs and paid board at the hostel. Of all of the residents, 31 were wards of the Native Affairs Branch. Rona Glynn (the first Indigenous Australian teacher in Central Australia, at the age of 16) was one of the working girls, and her younger sister Freda Glynn, then a student, went to work in media and co-found CAAMA. Both can be seen in the accompanying photo: the tallest girl in the back row is Rona Glynn, and on her left is Freda.

The second superintendent of the hostel was Captain, later Reverend, Colin Steep who worked there from 1956 - 1959 and it is he who struck up a friendship with Robert Czakó, a Hungarian artist, who he allowed and supported to paint the Robert Czakó Mural at the onsite chapel. This mural depicts biblical themes and was heritage listed in 2014.

The final two superintendents were Archdeacon Bott (1962–1966) and Bob Gaff (1971–1972). Gaff continued as superintendent when the home closed and became St Mary's Children's Village.

In 2016 Archbishop Freier claimed that the hostel had been "appropriated" by the post-war government to wrongfully remove children from their families and said that the Anglican Church:

"[R]ecognises the pain and suffering endured by Aboriginal people forcibly removed from their families and apologises for any of our Church policies and actions that have ever contributed, in any way, to that hurt.”

— Archbishop Philip Freier

== Sale of the site ==
In October 2022 it was announced by the Anglican Diocese of the Northern Territory that the property would be sold, as the church grapples with financial pressures.

A group of former residents, known as the St Mary's Stolen Generation Group, claim they haven't been property consulted about the sale.

Other former residents have taken to the media to voice their frustration at the sale as the site holds great significance to the people who called it home over many decades.

The St Mary's Stolen Generation Group has written to the bishop, asking that a section of the property, including the chapel, be gifted to the former residents and their families.

They've also asked that a memorial monument be built in front of the chapel, and 10 percent of the sale be invested into programs to connect past residents' families to the site.

The Diocese says that is hopes to find a buyer who would honour the legacy of the site, and continue to provide access to the chapel. As at August 2024 the site remains unsold and there are accusations that it is suffering from "demolition by neglect".

== Notable former residents ==
- Patricia Ansell Dodds, artist, elder and lecturer.
- Freda Glynn, co-founder of CAAMA, sister of Rona.
- Rona Glynn, first Indigenous teacher and nurse in Alice Springs, sister of Freda.
- Peter Gunner, who sued the Commonwealth Government for the mistreatment he experienced at the home.
- Rosalie Kunoth-Monks, actress, Aboriginal activist and politician.
- Tony Liddle, truck driver and Aboriginal activist.
- Sonny Morey (born 1945), Australian rules football player
