= Freda Glynn =

Aboriginal Australian media group founder

- Born: Alfreda Glynn; 24 August 1939 (age 86); Woodgreen Station, Northern Territory, Australia
- Years active: 1980s–present
- Known for: Co-founding CAAMA
- Children: Erica Glynn; Warwick Thornton
- Parents: Alf Price (Note: According to 1940 letter from R. H. Purvis of Wood Green Station, Central Australia, to the Minister of the Interior about Topsy Glynn: "I would explain that this girl [Topsy] is the daughter of James Glynn, halfcaste and a lubra... Glynn some years ago took Mr F R W Scott to Oodnadatta from Stirling Station for medical aid, while on the trip (by buggy approx 1919) his lubra (the mother of Topsy) was killed by the blacks, and Glynn gave the girl to bring up as it was almost impossible for him to do so in his nomadic job of stockman. In due course I prevailed upon the late Commissioner of Police R Stott to let the girl go to the institution, this he allowed although the girl is not a half-caste, conditionally that I took her out and gave her a job on the station when she had finished schooling. This I did, and the girl remained here with quarters of her own. In 1936 the girl gave birth to a child and stated that Ron Price was the father, this fact was admitted by Price, later I reported the birth and M C Muldoon came here on the case. In 1939, another child was born to her and Alf Price, brother of the father of her first child was the father. This birth wqas reported. I had occasion to take the girl wit her second child to the doctor and then after all the years, it was deemed fit to put her back in the institution... etc.) (father); Topsy Glynn (mother)
- Relatives: Rona Glynn (half-sister)

Alfreda "Freda" Glynn AM (born 24 August 1939), also known as Freda Thornton, is a Kaytetye photographer and media specialist. She was the first co-director of the Central Australian Aboriginal Media Association Group of Companies, which incorporates CAAMA and Imparja.

== Early life and family ==
Glynn was born on 24 August 1939 at Wood Green Station (Atartinga), 150 km (93 mi) north of Alice Springs, the daughter of Alf Price and Topsy Glynn, a housemaid and cook for a Mr R. H. Purvis (Ron Purvis Sr). (Note: ...and had also done stockwork and windmill repair work around the station and in return had only received clothing and rations.)

Freda's mother, Topsy Glynn, was born around 1916, the daughter of a "half-caste" stockman called James Glynn and an unnamed Aboriginal Australian woman. She was later described by the authorities as a "three-quarter-caste aboriginal". After Topsy's mother was killed, around 1919, Ron Purvis Sr persuaded the NT police commissioner Robert Stott to put Topsy in to the "Half-caste Institution Alice Springs" (The Bungalow, then at the Alice Springs Telegraph Station), although she was not technically "half-caste", on condition that Purvis employed her on Wood Green Station as soon as she had completed her schooling there, which he did. Glynn gave birth to two daughters on Atartinga /Wood Green. The first of these was Rona Glynn, born in 1936, whose father was Ron Price. Freda's father was Rona's father's brother, Alf Price. They are both granddaughters of Isobelle Violet Price (Hesketh), the first lone woman to run a station, after her husband Fred, telegraph master of Alice Springs Telegraph Station, had died. Freda never knew her father.

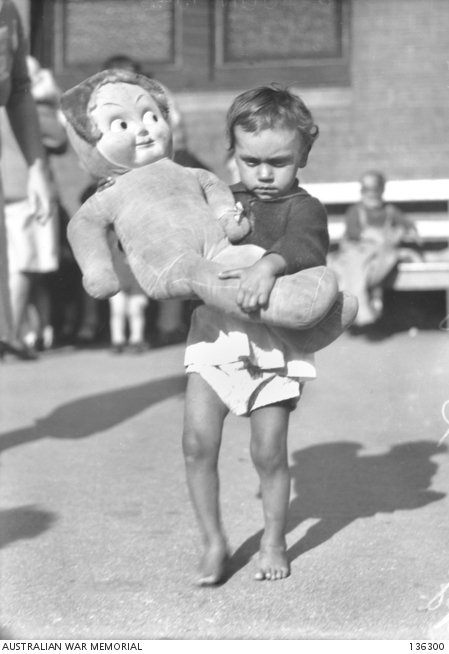
Freda Glynn with a doll in 1942 when enroute to New South Wales after being evacuated from the Northern Territory

Topsy was again admitted to The Bungalow on 12 September 1939, when Freda was just three weeks old and Rona was three years old, as there were post-birth health issues to be attended to, the authorities were trying to determine who Freda's father was, and owing to "the promiscuous manner in which Topsy was giving birth to half-caste infants at Wood Green station it was...considered to be in the girls best interests for her and her children to remain in the Institution". Topsy was not keen to return to the station, as she was employed by Purvis "as housemaid and cook and had also done stockwork and windmill repair work around the station and in return had only received clothing and rations", and was happy working as a laundress at the institution. However, by November 1940, Topsy was again working for Purvis at Wood Green under an agreement similar to that which governed the employment of half-caste girls in the township.

Following the bombing of Darwin in February 1942, there were military orders to evacuate The Bungalow, so Topsy went to find work on a farm in New South Wales with her girls. However bad circumstances there caused her to leave, and she was taken in by a couple in the Sydney suburb of Vaucluse as a domestic. Freda stayed with her, while the Church Missionary Society helped to place Rona at an Anglican home at Mulgoa, west of Sydney, where Freda later joined her. In late May 1942 a number of other children from The Bungalow were escorted to Mulgoa via Adelaide (and possibly Melbourne as well). (Note: John Kundereri Moriarty was also evacuated to this place from Roper River when he was four years old, although apparently did not stay at The Bungalow first.)

== Education ==
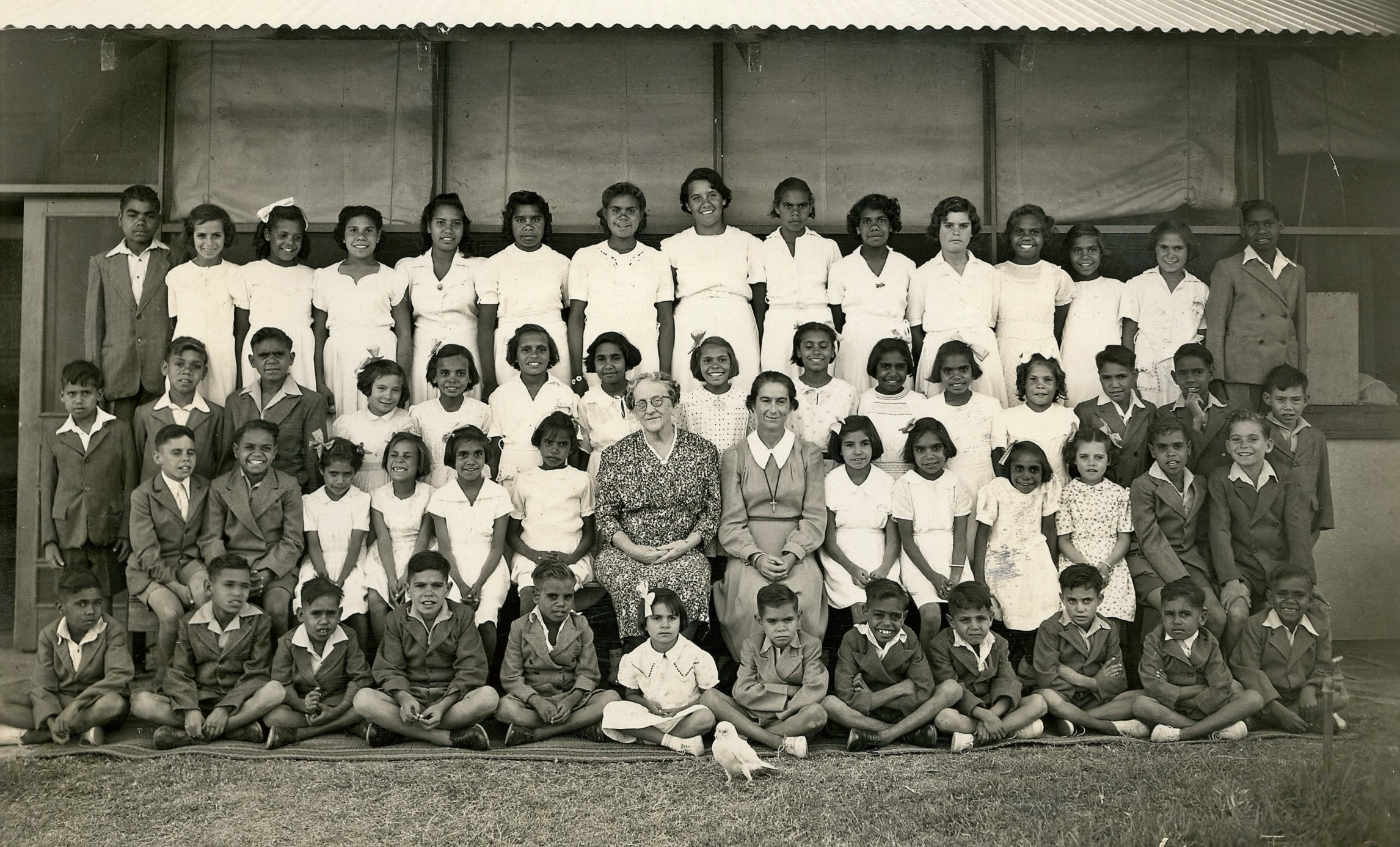
At St Mary's hostel in Alice Springs (c. 1950s); tallest girl in the back row is Rona Glynn, with sister Freda Glynn to the viewer's left

Glynn and her family were returned to Alice Springs in 1949, when she was 10 years old, and they lived at St Mary's Hostel, under the care of Sister Eileen Heath. St Mary's was run by the Australian Board of Missions, and provided accommodation and schooling for Aboriginal children who had been either placed there by their parents or by the Director of Native Affairs. Several returning evacuees were placed there after the war. In 1953, both Freda and Rona are listed as wards of the N.A.B., with Freda a school student while Rona was employed in Alice Springs.

The accompanying photo shows Rona – the tallest girl in the back row – and Erica, to her left, during this time.

== Career ==
After leaving school, in 1956, Glynn worked at Trish Collier's photographic studio in the darkroom; she was one of the first Aboriginal girls in Alice Springs to get a job other than as a domestic or cleaner. She had a number of other roles before she became involved in media. She also worked as a cleaner, and raised five children during this time.

In 1977, after gaining a community development qualification from the South Australian Institute of Technology, she started work as a community development adviser for the Department of Aboriginal Affairs.

In 1980, after much consideration, Glynn joined John Macumba and Philip Batty in volunteering to make The Aboriginal Half Hour, the first Aboriginal radio program in the Northern Territory, where she began recording interviews around town, doing the program "links" and voice-overs as well as working on English language programming. Following this Glynn became an advocate for Aboriginal media and was appointed as a committee member of CAAMA when it was chartered on 12 May 1980; this again was a voluntary position.

In June 1981 Macumba resigned as the director of CAAMA and was replaced by Glynn, then known by her married name Thornton, with Philip Batty as the deputy director; the two worked together from 1981 to 1991. During this period CAAMA grew exponentially and they established:

- 8KIN-FM, the first Aboriginal radio station in Australia (1980)
- CAAMA Productions, a film and video production house
- CAAMA Shop Pty. Ltd, retail outlets
- Imparja Television, a commercial television service, which started broadcasting in 1988, and was chaired by Glynn for some time

During the early 1980s, CAAMA also mailed out around 300 audio cassette tapes each month to remote rural communities, containing news that affected them, along with health information, interviews, music and stories.

After Imparja was established, a three-year training grant was provided by the government, which provided training for Indigenous students in journalism, film, and other aspects of media. Two of Glynn's children, Erica Glynn and Warwick Thornton, and her granddaughter Tanith Glynn-Maloney, along with many other now well-known names in the industry, such as Trisha Morton-Thomas, Rachel Perkins, and Steven McGregor, got their initial training at CAAMA.

Following her time at CAAMA, Glynn continued to work in media.

== Recognition and honours ==
- 1984: NADOC Aboriginal of the Year (NT)
- 1991: Member of the Order of Australia, in the Australia Day Honours list, for service to broadcasting and to the Aboriginal community
- 2002: Award for Contribution to Indigenous Media at the Third Tudawali Indigenous Film and Video Awards
- 2018: Don Dunstan Award at the Adelaide Film Festival, along with her filmmaking family members

== In film ==
In 2002 Glynn played Grandma Nina in the short drama film Shit Skin, about a young man who takes his grandmother back to her childhood community, in order to reconnect with her surviving family.

In 2019 Erica Glynn released her feature documentary, She Who Must Be Loved, about her mother; she was assisted by her granddaughter Tanith Glynn-Maloney. The film had its world premiere at the 2018 Adelaide Film Festival on 13 October 2018, which was attended by the family, and was also screened at the 2019 Sydney Film Festival, at which Freda Glynn addressed the audience.

== Family and impact ==
Glynn is the matriarch of a filmmaking family. Two of her children, Erica Glynn and Warwick Thornton, are both successful filmmakers, as are two of her grandchildren: Dylan River and Tanith Glynn-Maloney. Thornton has said that his mother taught him to have a voice, as she expressed her anger at the injustices around her, and Erica said "CAAMA was about giving voice to people who'd never had voice". Freda Glynn showed her offspring and many others that (in Erica's words) "you can't tell anyone else's story"; Australia needs Indigenous storytellers, and CAAMA had enabled many of them to pursue their careers.

Rona Glynn-McDonald, founder of not-for-profit Common Ground, which works to expand and disseminate knowledge, cultures and stories of Indigenous Australians, is another granddaughter.
