= Kutcha butcha =

Hindi phrase

Kutcha butcha (कच्चा बच्चा) is a Hindi phrase that means "half-baked child,” and is used to refer to biracial people of Indian and (white) British ancestry. The expression consists of two words: kutcha, meaning “uncooked” or “underdone,” and butcha, which literally means “child.” The two words together translate roughly as a child who resembles half-baked bread. It is primarily a derogatory term, meant to indicate the inadequacy of the individual, being neither Indian nor British, and it emphasizes the lack of belonging generally experienced by these individuals. Kutcha butcha is colloquially synonymous with half-caste, terminology that is characteristic of hypodescent, which occurs when offspring of mixed-race unions are assigned to the ethnic group that is perceived by the dominant group as being subordinate.

== History ==
During the period of British colonialism on the Indian subcontinent, English colonists, many of whom were employed by the East India Company, were encouraged to marry with the locals. In fact, the East India Company offered a stipend to Indian mothers upon the baptism of any offspring from an English Company employee.

Over time, a number of different factors led to a shift in attitude toward the progenies of these marriages. Firstly, the development of the Suez Canal allowed for a much shorter journey from England to India; and more British women travelled to India. Secondly, as generations of Anglo-Indians began to marry each other and create their own communities, Indian women were no longer considered necessary for the colonists to marry. The result was the creation of a distinct group of individuals who spoke English almost exclusively, and were, by and large, loyal to the Empire. This created an isolating effect, which led to their self-imposed exclusion from Indian culture. Finally, when India achieved independence from England through the Indian Independence Act 1947, most English expatriates returned to England, and many Anglo-Indians left India also, creating a diaspora through the Commonwealth, in countries such as Canada, Australia, and England, itself. (It is estimated that there are one million Anglo-Indians worldwide today.) And as Anglo-Indians are not merely the result of mixed British and Indian heritage—they are the product of a particular time and place, the historical circumstance of British India—those Anglo-Indians who did not or could not leave were ostracized, and referred to as kutcha butcha.

Originally, the label given to members of these communities was Eurasians, or in the case of Portuguese-Indian unions, Luso-Indians. As the English became more predominant, and the Portuguese and other Europeans left the subcontinent, the term Eurasian eventually became inaccurate, and was replaced with the more-desirable Anglo-Indian. The phrase kutcha butcha refers primarily to the descendants of English fathers and Indian mothers (and their descendants, too).

== Racism and related terms ==
The term kutcha butcha was coined because of the stigma that began to be attached to members of this biracial community, and is indicative of the racism that can occur whenever people of different races marry. This is evident in terms such as mulatto, quadroon, and octaroon, which seek to identify and quantify the exact amount of so-called inferior or tainted blood one has mixed in with the supposed genetically superior blood of the acceptable race. Because of this stigma, many Anglo-Indians (not wanting to be identified as kutcha butcha) have tried in the past and up to present day to pass as either Indian or English; this is known as racial passing. Historically, it has been more desirable for Anglo-Indians to pass as British, as they “would perhaps have better job opportunities and class privileges.”

Often, in the time of the East Indian Company rule, children of such mixed-race marriages were divvied up and raised differently, depending on their skin colour. Light-skinned, fair-haired, European-looking offspring were taken to England and educated there, and darker-skinned offspring were kept in India.

Because of this history of racism, many Anglo-Indians and Indo-Britons have concealed their heritage. Famous actresses such as Merle Oberon and Vivien Leigh hid their Anglo-Indian ancestry, as did ex-Beatle Pete Best. As well, some British celebrities, such as Alistair McGowan, have previously had their lineage hidden from them because of family shame.
