= Robert Bruce Plowman =

(1886-1966) Presbyterian missionary

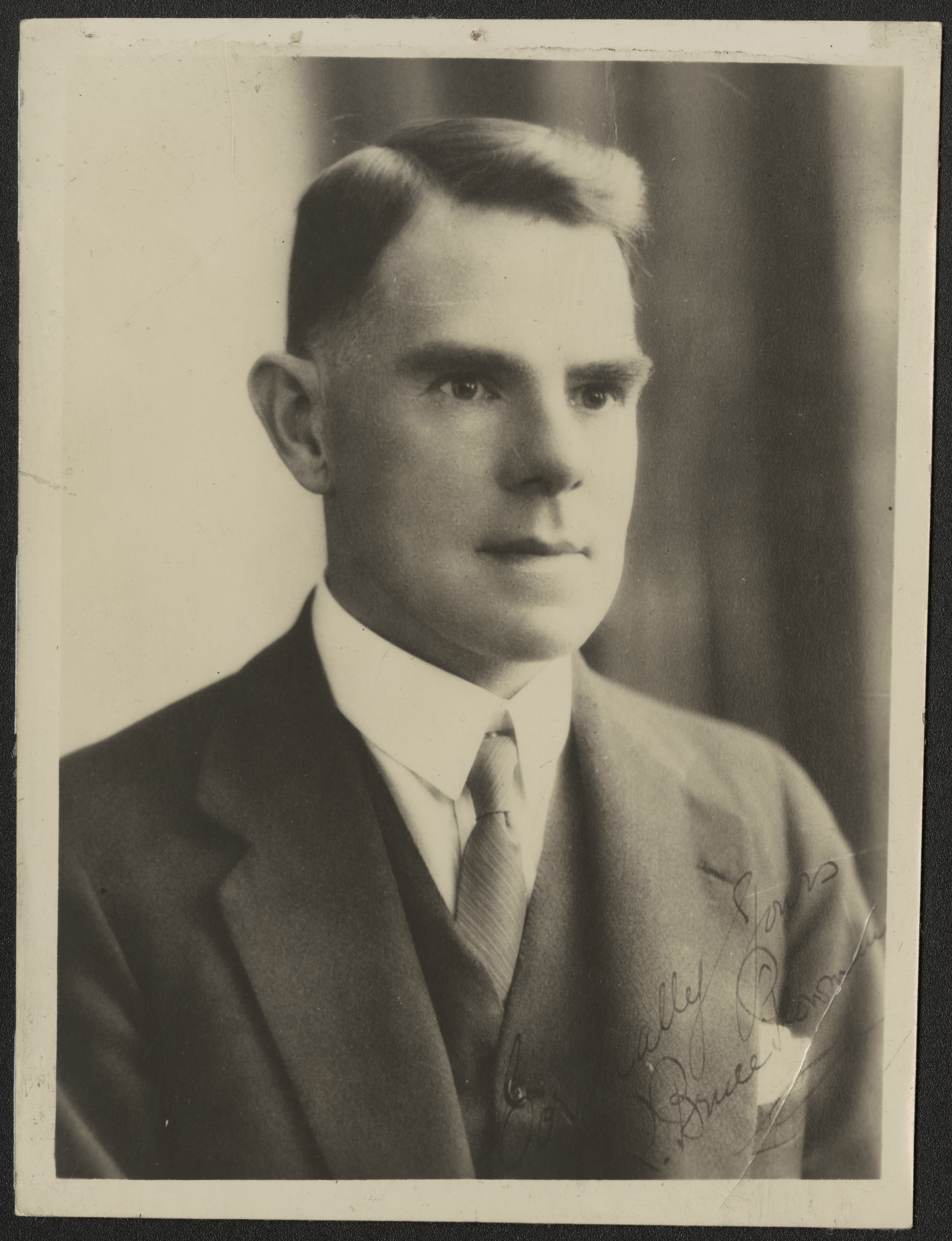
Robert Bruce Plowman, portrait taken between 1926 and 1936

Robert Bruce Plowman (25 October 1886 - 26 August 1966) was an Australian Presbyterian missionary who worked as a patrol padre, under John Flynn, in Central Australia between 1912 and 1917. He also published three books about his experiences in this work and one novel.

== Early life and ministry ==
Plowman was born in South Melbourne to William and Margaret Plowman and, due to family circumstances, he left school at the age of eleven to support them. It is not known what work he undertook during this period but in around 1909, at the age of 23, he was able to enroll in Scotch College so that he could study for acceptance into the ministry training through the Presbyterian church. He was unable to complete these subjects due to a lack of money and, instead, applied to become a home missionary which did not require them same qualifications. He was accepted and, soon after, appointed to a parish in Balmoral in regional Victoria.

While a home missionary Plowman attended the General Assembly of the Presbyterian Church in Melbourne where, on 26 September 1912, John Flynn addressed the crowds and proposed adding coverage of the Northern Territory and other remote regions as a part of the 'Special Home Mission Area' which lead to the creation of the Australian Inland Mission. This immediately interested Plowman and he sought out an immediate appointment, in a voluntary capacity, for the next five years. This commented in November 1912 and, during this, period only his expenses were covered by the church.

Plowman's first appointment with Flynn was at the Smith of Dunesk Mission in Beltana, in the Flinders Ranges of South Australia. Here he worked on semi-patrol and visited the people living in the surrounding regions including miners and pastoralists.

== Work as a patrol padre ==
In 1914 Plowman relocated to the Oodnadatta where he as a 'patrol padre' (travelling missionary) who covered a wide region of the country from his base there to Tennant Creek. Plowman primarily travelled by camel and he was taught the basic skills of how to handle them and the required bush skills by local men which included Herry Gepp and Billy Gregg.

On Plowman's first trip, between 27 April and 14 September 1914, he travelled with his friend Robert Henry Purvis, who was more experienced in remote travel. The pair primarily visited pastoral stations throughout the region as well as Arltunga (a mining town). During this trip Plowman made his first visit to Alice Springs, then known as Stuart, where he put on a magic lantern picture show and gave children camel rides; on 21 May 1914 he held the first church service ever offered there.

Plowman's trips continued from here and, as a lay pastor, he conducted church services when asked, performed marriages, baptisms and conducted funeral services and burials. In additional to this work Plowman also taught many people literacy skills, helped them to write letters, delivered first aid and offered general assistance for whatever was required.

Suffering from exhaustion and health issues Plowman began to train his replacement Kingsley Partridge who would become his successor and he left the role in 1917.

== Later career ==
After finishing his work as a patrol padre Plowman married Jane Lillian Sinclair on 18 June 1918 and they moved together to Queenstown in Tasmania. Later the pair moved to Bendigo, back in Victoria, where he worked as a real estate agent and was involved in other business ventures.

Plowman experienced significant periods of poor health and, during these illnesses, he wrote and published three books about his work in Central Australia. These are:

- The man from Oodnadatta (1933).
- Camel pads (1935).
- The boundary rider (1935).

He additionally wrote a novel entitled: Larapinta (1939).

Plowman continued to be involved in the church and served as an Elder and lay preacher.

He died in Melbourne on 26 August 1966.

== Papers ==
On his patrols Plowman kept a regular diary which, in addition to keeping a daily account of his travels, also records the names of all of the Colonists living in the region between 1914 and 1917.

Plowman's papers, which include his diaries, correspondence and manuscripts are held at the National Library of Australia.

== Legacy ==
The following places in Alice Springs are named for Plowman:

- Bruce Street in Gillen, Northern Territory.
- Plowman Park in Gillen, Northern Territory.
- Plowman Street in Araluen, Northern Territory.
