= Robert Czakó Mural =

Painting in Alice Springs, Northern Territory, Australia

The Robert Czakó Mural is a mural painting at St. Mary's Hostel in Alice Springs in the Northern Territory of Australia. It was painted by Hungarian Artist Robert Czakó in 1958. The mural depicts 22 biblical scenes and characters while also incorporating people living at the hostel at that time.

== Background ==
In 1958, the superintendent of St Mary's Hostel, Captain Colin Steep, was driving back to the hostel when he passed Czakó painting the local scenery, including Pitchi Richi Sanctuary, and was very impressed with him as a painter and also for his likeable demeanour. Steep invited him home for tea and, ultimately, asked him to stay and allowed him to set up a studio in one of the sheds.

The children at St. Mary's found his name difficult to pronounce and the nicknamed him "Mr Charcoal".

Following prayers in the chapel one evening Czakó was very excited and said that he had visualised a large mural for the space and said that he would paint in, free of charge, if his supplies were provided. After the wall was prepared Czakó spent a few weeks panning and then only six weeks to paint the mural in full.

A picture of the mural is available on Territory Stories.

== The Mural ==
The mural depicts 22 scenes:

1. The nativity scene
2. Jesus in the temple
3. Gethsemane
4. Pilate washes his hands
5. The soldiers put a scarlet robe on Jesus
6. Christ carrying the cross
7. The angel at the tomb
8. The Ascension
9. Pentecost
10. St. John writing with a quill
11. The four beasts behind John
12. The Four Horsemen with their horses
13. Bodies and skeletons
14. [As Above]
15. The bottomless pit
16. The resurrection of bodies
17. St. Michael slaying the dragon
18. The woman ascending into heaven
19. Three Jewish prophets from The Old Testament
20. The seven saints, new testament and history
  - St. John the Baptist
  - St. George; patron saint of England
  - St. Elizabeth of Hungary
  - St. Joan of Arc; the maid of New Orleans
  - St. Francis of Assisi; founder of the Franciscan order
  - St. Patrick; the patron saint of Ireland
  - St. Peter
21. The Church
22. The large group of people; this scene is used by Czakó to relate to the picture of the Pentecost where the Holy Spirit, in the form of a dove, came to the Virgin Mary and the 11 apostles and they began to speak in different tongues and it shows people from around the world as well as more people from the hostel including:
  - Captain Colin Steep; the superintendent who was depicted wearing an ordained ministers cassock (which he was not) and Czakó, correctly, said he would be one day.
  - Norah Thompson; the cook at the hostel was depicted in a wheelchair with a guard dog in reference to her hating dogs. Again, strangely, Thompson would one day require a wheelchair.
  - Ruth Richardson; Norah's sister who also worked at the hostel was depicted dressed as a barrister, which she had practised as earlier in her life (the sisters were both in their 70s and while on a holiday from England decided they would take jobs at the hostel).
  - Robert Czakó; Czakó depicted himself as an elderly blind man with a white beard. When asked why he painted himself this way he said that "he was unable to see the true value of things".

== Heritage Protection ==
The Robert Czakó Mural was listed on the Northern Territory Heritage Register in 2014.

Jose Petrick has been a long time researcher and advocate for the mural and published: The Robert Czakó Mural, St Mary's family services and beyond.

In July 2021 restoractions took place at the mural, led by Petrick, and supported by a NT Heritage Grant. Conservators and volunteers worked on the mural colour by colour.
