= Tony Liddle =

Australian tour guide

Anthony Liddle (born 1940) is a truck driver and tour guide who has made a significant contribution to the development of Central Australia.

== Early life ==
Liddle was born at Hatches Creek, his mother's country, in the Davenport Ranges of Central Australia to Milton and Polly (Ngwarie) Liddle in 1940. In 1942, when he was a toddler, the family moved to Alice Springs, although they did regularly visit his family's cattle station Angas Downs Station (now Angas Downs Indigenous Protected Area).

As an Aboriginal family, they were subject to regular inspection and, at risk of the children being taken farther away, they were forced to make the decision to have the children live away: the government considered Liddle and his siblings "5\8 caste". Because of this, Tony and his siblings boarded at the convent and, from 1951 - 1956, St. Mary's Hostel, an institution for half-caste children, and they attended Hartley Street School during the day.

Liddle has said that he was luckier than other children living at St. Mary's as he was not a ward in the same way and he was able to visit his family during the school holidays.

== Working life ==
After finishing school, in 1956, Liddle spent a year working in a stock camp at Alcoota Station before getting his truck driver's licence in his father's Morris Commercial.

Starting in 1958 Liddle worked for his father in the families small wood cutting and carrying business, alongside his brothers Bob and Mick. The business grew and they were soon delivering rations and fuel to many remote communities, and what were then, government settlements throughout the region. Liddle fondly remembers delivering water to Albert Namatjira.

Liddle left his father's business and worked for Rosewall Construction and worked to extend the airstrip at the hospital.

However, in late 1960 Liddle started working for Len Tuit running tours from 'the chalet' in Alice Springs to Palm Valley and the, short-lived tourist enterprise (pioneered by Tuit), Serpentine Lodge. Liddle was a well liked tour guide and "the passengers loved his personality and dedication to the job".

Liddle gave up driving tours in 1992 and worked driving and operating machinery for Ingkerreke, outstation resource services, for 13 years before retiring, at age 65, in 2005.

== Later life ==
Since retiring Liddle has shared his story of growing up as a part of a large, well-known, Central Australian Aboriginal family and show how involved Aboriginal people have been in all industries in Central Australia; especially the cattle industry where his family had been involved since the early 1900s.

Liddle speaks about this regularly and is quoted as saying:

"All the Aboriginal people in the cattle industry worked like hell until equal pay came through and they were pushed off the stations.

That wasn't so much the case in the government settlements, where people were sitting around.

If they'd educated these people properly, the town would be a lot different today".

In 2014 Liddle was inducted into the Shell Rimula Wall of Fame at ReUnion at the National Road Transport Hall of Fame.
