= Erica Glynn =

Aboriginal Australian filmmaker

- Born: 1964 (age 61–62)
- Occupation: Film director
- Children: Tanith Glynn-Maloney
- Mother: Freda Glynn
- Relatives: Warwick Thornton (brother); Rona Glynn (aunt)

Erica Glynn (born 1964) is an Aboriginal Australian filmmaker, known for directing, producing and writing documentaries and other films.

== Early life, education and family ==
Glynn was born in 1964. She is the daughter of photographer Freda Glynn, sister of director Warwick Thornton, and niece of educator Rona Glynn.

She is a drama directing graduate of the Australian Film, Television and Radio School in Sydney.

== Career ==
Glynn started her working life at the Central Australian Aboriginal Media Association (CAAMA) in Alice Springs, which had been co-founded by her mother Freda.

In 2001 she wrote and directed the documentary short Ngangkari, about the traditional healers of the Central Desert Region known as ngangkari. The film, which was shot by Warwick Thornton, was made for series 3 of Australia by Numbers, a TV series commissioned by SBS Television in collaboration with state agencies featuring short films by emerging filmmakers from South Australia, the Northern Territory, New South Wales, Queensland, Western Australia, Tasmania, and Victoria. The film was screened at the Berlin International Film Festival in 2013.

In 2003 she started working for the Australian Film Commission, becoming head of the Indigenous Department of Screen Australia from 2010 until 2014. She was executive producer of the ABC TV series Redfern Now, The Gods of Wheat Street, and 8MMM Aboriginal Radio.

Glynn did some of the writing for Little J & Big Cuz, an animated children's series, and co-directed Black Comedy, both on ABC TV.

In 2017 she wrote and directed In My Own Words, a documentary about the community adult literacy campaign run by the Literacy for Life Foundation in Brewarrina, New South Wales. The film was selected for the Sydney Film Festival that year.

Glynn wrote, directed and co-produced the feature-length documentary, She Who Must Be Loved, about her mother Freda. It was co-produced by Erica's daughter Tanith Glynn-Maloney. The film had its world premiere at the 2018 Adelaide Film Festival on 13 October 2018, which was attended by the family. It was also screened at the 2019 Sydney Film Festival, at which Freda Glynn addressed the audience, and won Best Australian Documentary at the festival.

Glynn is co-creator, writer and director of the 2022 drama series for SBS Television, True Colours.

== Recognition ==
In 2017 Glynn was the recipient of the David and Joan Williams Documentary Fellowship.

== Awards ==
My Bed, Your Bed (1998)

- Winner, Special Commendation, 1998 Cork International Film Festival

She Who Must Be Loved (2018)

- Best Documentary (audience award), 2018 Adelaide Film Festival
- Best Australian Documentary, 2019 Sydney Film Festival

== Selected filmography ==
Documentary shorts

- Redreaming the Dark (1998)
- My Bed, Your Bed (1998)
- Maude and Pearlie Too (1999)
- Ngangkari (2001)
- In My Own Words (2017)

Documentary feature

- She Who Must Be Loved (2018)
