= Robert Henry Purvis =

Australian pastoralist (c. 1885–1965)

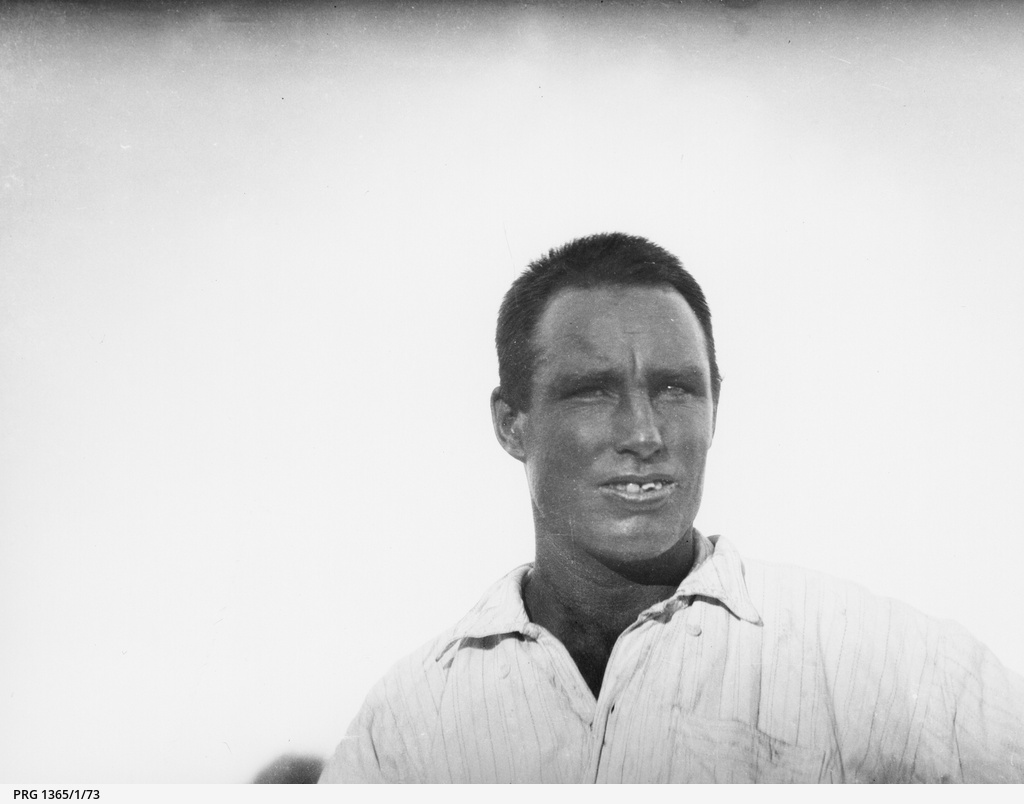
Robert Henry Purvis, also known as Bob Purvis, in 1922

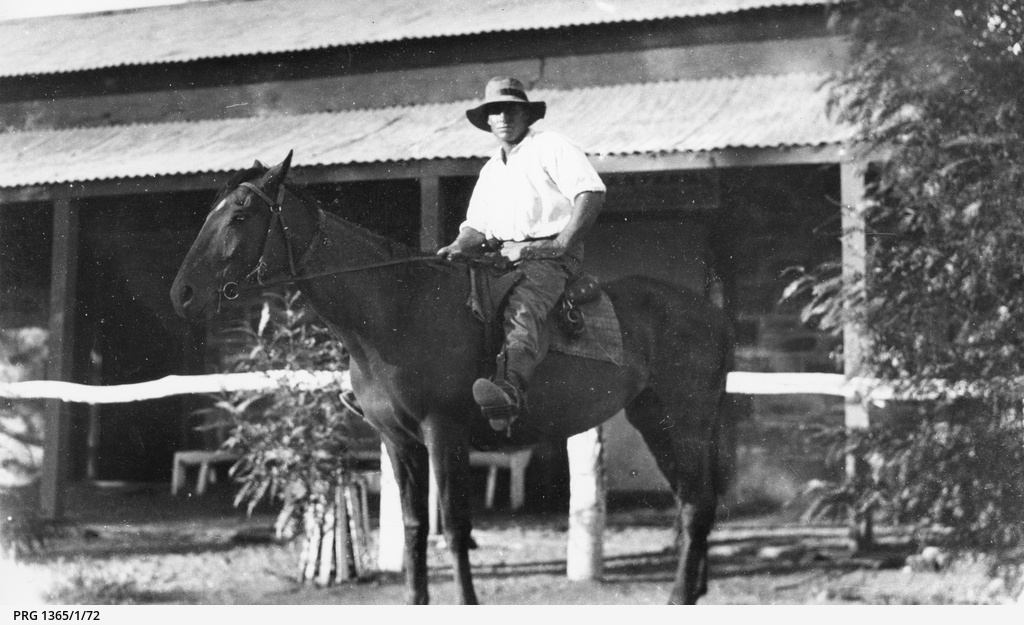
Bob Purvis outside the Stuart Arms Hotel in 1922

Robert Henry Purvis or Bob Purvis (c. 1885 – 30 September 1965) was a bush worker and pastoralist that spent much of his life in Central Australia in the Northern Territory.

== Early life ==
Purvis was born in Aberdeen in Scotland in about 1885 and very little is known of his early life and education but there is evidence that he began, but did not complete, a law degree.

When he first immigrated to Australia he did so as a sport instructor and he worked with men Weber, Shorthose, and Rice who ran several gymnasiums in Melbourne and around Australia. He was particularly skilled in gymnastics, boxing and wrestling.

At an unknown date he broke his hand during a title fight and, refusing the suggestion of Australian surgeons, refused to have it amputated and returned to England where two of his knuckles were removed and the hand was reset. This injury would cause his difficulty with his hand for the rest of his life

After this he returned to Melbourne but, unable to find work due to the damage to his hand, he travelled to Tarcoola in South Australia and then further north into South Australia where he worked on the construction of the Central Australia Railway where he worked from the Irrapanta Siding; here he shoveled sand and was paid six shillings a day.

During this time he slowly built up more use of his had and begun to take on contract work to repair yards and wells and, in 1906, helped to rebuild the homestead at Purple Downs Station which was north of present day Woomera.

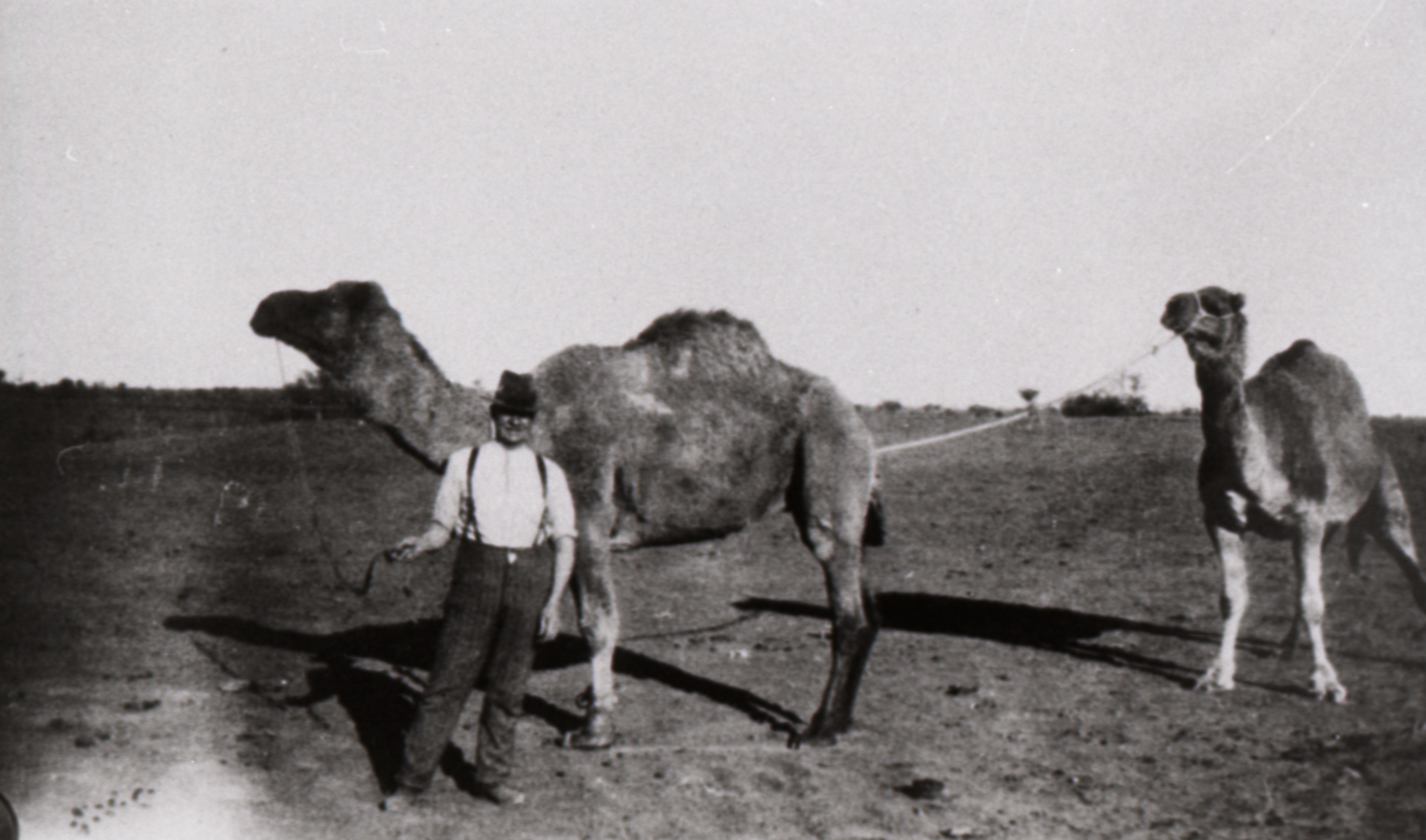
Bob Purvis as a camel driver in the 1920s

Purvis was a horse lover and soon he began operating horse teams, and then camel teams, between Oodnadatta and Daly Waters and he worked for Charles Bagot and Fred Marsh for the first three years until he earned enough money to purchase his own string of 20 camels. It was during this time that Purvis met with Robert Bruce Plowman, a padre for the Australian Inland Mission, who recorded his love of scotch whiskey and that he had the 'drinking capacity of a camel' and referred to his as 'Scotch Bob'.

Soon after their purchase of these camels though, and on his first trip, most of them died after eating Gastrolobium, a poisonous bush, which passing through Murray Downs Station.

== Life in the Northern Territory ==
Discouraged by the loss of his camels it appears that Purvis left Oodnadatta soon after and took out a clam, known as 'The Ace of Spades' at Hatches Creek wolfram field in the Northern Territory; he was there in October 1916 and the director of mines reported that he was 'getting fair ore'. While at Hatches Creek he also took out work on surrounding stations sinking bores and finding water for pastoralists.

In 1919 he decided that he wanted to take up land for himself and applied for a pastoral lease just east of Barrow Creek, this application was granted in 1920 but he soon gave it up after a serious tetanus infection changed his plan. The infection was the result of Robert Stott pulling an infected tooth from him with fencing pliers meaning that Purvis had to be brought into Alice Springs (Mparntwe), strapped to a back of a horse, and then, as no doctor was available there at the time, transported to Adelaide where part of his travels were strapped to a camel.

Purvis was recovered by 1924 and returned to the Northern Territory where he was granted another pastoral lease, Woodgreen Station and, while establishing it, he also took on work repairing wells for the Overland Telegraph Line between Burt Well and Kelly Well. Between 1926 and 1928 he also had the contract to sink wells of the Sandover Stockroute, now the Sandover Highway. it was during this period he earned the nickname “The Sandover Alligator” which was also in reference to his ability to eat large amounts including one instance where, in one meal, he ate a small goat with soup made from its head, 60 boiled eggs and most of a pie which had been prepared as a meal for 10 railway gangers. He was not able to finish consuming the pie as the cook had placed soap in it and he lost the bet. He mostly ate these meals as bets.

In the 1930s, Purvis bred horses there for the British Indian Army as well as race horses (with the brand "RTP") as well as carrying sheep and small amounts of cattle until, around 1940, changing to primarily become a cattle station. The property was expanded at some point, but as the government stipulated minimum livestock numbers, the land was overgrazed, and likely mismanaged, according to reports of his son. In 1954 the station was badly affected by drought and, again, in 1957 drought led to culling and sale of many horses.

In the 1930s Purvis also formed the Barrow Creek Racing Club, which is now known as the Aileron Bush Club, and he acted as an officiant and judge at their events. Before 1940 he would also represent people in court in Alice Springs who could not afford a lawyer, using the knowledge gained in the law course he did not complete in his youth.

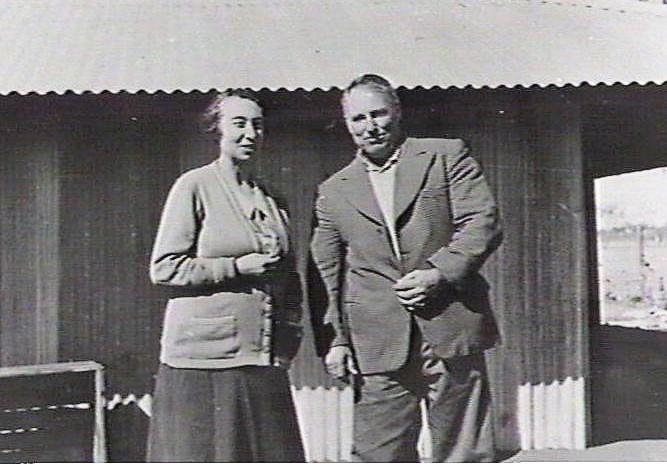
Purvis and Adele Viola at Woodgreen Station, c. 1940s

On 29 April 1936 Purvis married Adela Violet Purvis who had been working as a governess at Undoolya Station. The pair had one surviving child together Bob Purvis Jnr who was born in 1937. Adela, known most commonly as Adele was also a keen local historian, and founded the National Trust of Australia (Northern Territory). She published articles, and was also the first person to donate a box of papers to the Northern Territory Archives, now Library & Archives NT in Alice Springs office after it opened in 2003.

Purvis handed over the management of Woodgreen station to his son in 1960 along with a large debt, largely due to land degradation and poor grazing practices; the debts exceeded the property's value, and three quarters of the land was unusable.

Purvis died on 30 September 1965 in Alice Springs and is buried at Woodgreen Station.

== Legacy ==
Purvis Crescent in the Alice Springs suburb of Gillen is named for him.
