= Yambah Station =

Pastoral lease in the Northern Territory

Coordinates: 23°7′42″S 133°49′59″E

Location in Northern Territory

Yambah Station is a pastoral lease that operates as a cattle station in the Northern Territory of Australia.

== Location ==
Yambah is a located approximately 63 km (39 mi) north of Alice Springs. In 1940 four blocks were selected and subdivided from 17 choices in Bond Springs.

== Description ==
The property occupies an area of 2,310 km^{2} (890 sq mi), has double frontage to the Stuart Highway, and shares a boundary with Strangeways Range and Kambah Stations. It is composed of typical rangeland grazing country that is either open or lightly timbered and has a variety of native grasses, herbage and introduced buffel giving good overall coverage. The average rainfall on the property is approximately 300 mm (12 in) per annum, and it is equipped with 21 dams or waterholes and 23 bores. It was stocked with a herd of approximately 4,800 head of cattle in 2018.

== History ==
In 2018 the property was up for sale; the owners were Aaron and Karina Gorey, whose family have owned the property over three generations since the 1940s.

In June 2023, Dan and Sally Muenster purchased Yambah Station for $28 million.

== See also ==
- List of ranches and stations
