= Eileen Heath =

Australian Anglican deaconess (1905–2011)

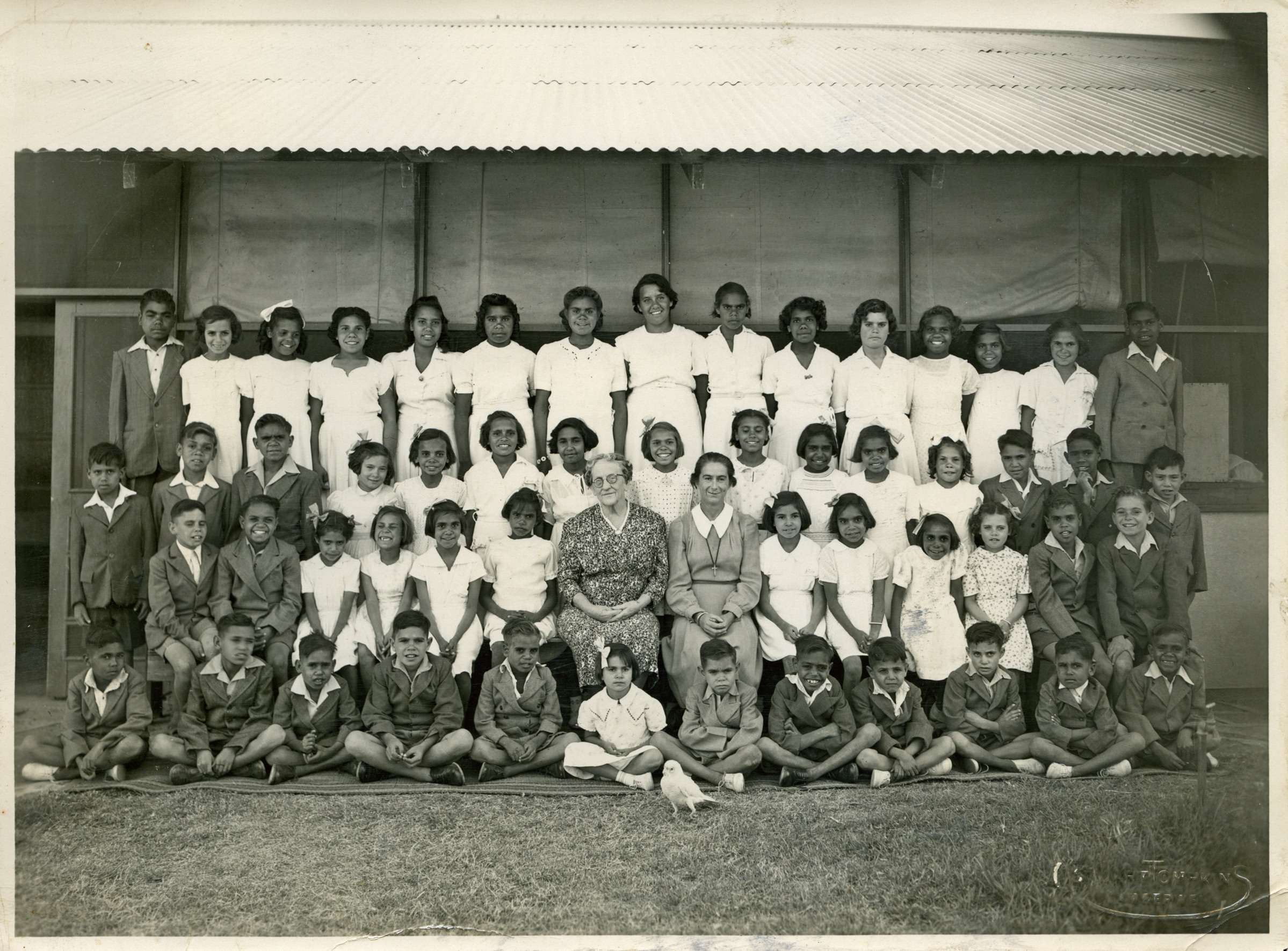
Sister Eileen Heath amidst the students at St. Mary's

Sister Eileen Heath (29 November 1905 – 22 October 2011) was an Anglican deaconess who worked as the superintendent of St. Mary's Hostel in Alice Springs from 1946 to 1955 and was a tireless campaigner for Aboriginal welfare who took a stand against her own church in the 1940s.

== Early life ==
Heath was the daughter of John and Susan Heath and was born in Fremantle, Western Australia and she attended school at St. Joeseph's Convent before moving, in 1914, to the East Fremantle State School. Heath joined the Australian Board of Missions as a teenager and, ultimately, deciding to become a deaconess. She trained at Deaconess House and was ordained in 1938. Before coming to the Northern Territory, where Heath spent most of her career, she worked at the Moore River Native Settlement between 1935 and 1944. She was disgusted by conditions there where many Aboriginal people were forced to live and 'half-caste' children, and often their mothers, were forced to live in overcrowded and insufficient conditions. In 1935 the settlement was "at crisis point" and, despite the compound being designed for 200 people, had 300 people living there (mostly children) and the area surrounding it was surrounded by people living in tin, bag and brush humpies: The Great Depression was hitting hard.

After 9 years working at the settlement she was fired for, very publicly, criticising the way that it was run and the poor conditions.

== Life in the Northern Territory ==
Heath moved the Alice Springs to Work at St. Mary's Hostel, where she was the first superintendent, in 1946 alongside her friend Lillian Schroder who would serve as the housekeeper and seamstress. They welcomed their first residents on 2 March 1946, four children (two girls and two boys) from Newcastle Waters Station and from there the numbers continued to grow. Eight months later there were 18 children and this number continued to grow to a peak of 71 in 1955.

It is said that Heath took a very active interest in the children and that they lived a relaxed and carefree existence; playing sport, climbing trees and riding donkeys. Heath also encouraged the children to be involved in community events including the Children's Fancy Dress Ball and Guy Fawkes Night. Heath left the hostel in 1955, after 10 years of service, when she started working for the Welfare Branch in Alice Springs where she was employed as a field welfare officer. From 1970 -1975 she returned to St. Mary's, which became St Mary's Children's Village in 1972, as a social worker. Throughout her time in the Northern Territory she was also an active member if the local Girl Guides Association and helped establish a number of packs.

== Later life ==
Heath retired to live in Western Australia in 1992 and died on 22 October 2011; at age 105. Heath Road (registered 17 July 1981), on the southern boundary of St. Mary's Hostel in named for Heath.

== Honours ==
- Received a MBE for community service in 1968.
- Received an Order of Merit from the Girl Guides Association in 1970.
- Was made an honorary Lady Canon of Christ Church Cathedral, Darwin, in 1982.
- Was named 'Centralian of the Year; with co-recipient Sue Ride in 1992.
