= Central Australian Aboriginal Media Association =

Australian Aboriginal media organization

The Central Australian Aboriginal Media Association (CAAMA) is an organisation founded in 1980 to expose Aboriginal music and culture to the rest of Australia. It started with 8KIN-FM, the first Aboriginal radio station in the country. Based in Alice Springs, the organisation is particularly focused on the involvement of the local Indigenous community in its production. CAAMA is involved in radio, television and recorded music.

== History ==
=== Radio ===
In 1980, CAAMA originally established itself as a public radio station by two Aboriginal people and one "whitefella": Freda Glynn, Phillip Batty, and John Macumba. 8KIN-FM was the first Aboriginal radio station.

The success of the station quickly grew, leading its content to extend into music (country music and Aboriginal rock), call-ins, discussion, and news and current affairs. Broadcasts were made in six different languages, alongside English, and operated about 15 hours every day. Later expansions saw the station move into AM and short-wave broadcasts with educational programmes, live recordings of Aboriginal bands, and commercials for local Aboriginal products and services. One of its popular programs was Green Bush, which played music on request from prisoners, and broadcast to remote communities, also acting as a kind of bulletin board or open telephone line among listeners. Filmmaker Warwick Thornton (son of Freda Glynn) worked as a DJ on the programme as a teenager.

=== Video unit ===
In 1983, CAAMA established a mobile video unit, which travelled to remote communities, "documenting vanishing worlds in real time". Thorton worked with the unit as a camera trainee, working alongside sound recordist David Tranter and filmmaker Rachel Perkins.

=== Imparja Television ===
CAAMA obtained its Regional Commercial Television Services licence in 1986 after concern was raised that Australia's first satellite (AUSSAT), which was set to bring commercial television to regional and remote sections of Australia, would have a detrimental impact on Aboriginal languages and cultures in Central Australia. CAAMA made a bid to obtain the licence being offered in 1985 via the Australian Broadcasting Tribunal Central Zone RCTS licence hearings process. CAAMA's bid was a symbolic act that was then taken seriously, as “the tribunal provided the arena for the articulation of national media policies at least nominally in support of the concerns of remote-living Aboriginal people”. In January 1988, the private commercial television station owned by CAAMA, Imparja, began broadcasting, servicing at least 100,000 viewers in Central Australia.

Imparja contributed to a visible increase of Aboriginal identity in the Australian media landscape. The station was crucial in developing content which attempted to maintain and sustain Aboriginal culture. The long-running Aboriginal culture and language documentary program series Nganampa Anwernekenhe (meaning "Ours" in the Pitjantjatjara and Arrernte languages) began in 1987. It comprised hundreds of 30-minute episodes, on which David Tranter was sound recordist and also directed a couple. Nearly 31 hours of the series' films are held on videocassette by AIATSIS.

During the first few years of Imparja, CAAMA faced concerns from media activists that commercial programming would consume local content. Other concerns were raised of the lack of Aboriginal presence in Imparja's programming; although Imparja was the largest television enterprise owned by Aboriginal people in Australia, only 10% its staff were Aboriginal. American anthropologist Faye Ginsburg suggested in 1993 that the establishment of CAAMA and the spread of communications technology could threaten the relationship between generations and the respect for traditional knowledge.

== Impact and significance ==
CAAMA's multimedia-based approach ensured that Aboriginal media became an important part of the Australian media landscape, and to the social, cultural, and economic development of Aboriginal people in remote parts of Australia. Faye Ginsburg wrote in 1994:

Aboriginal media products are as various as Aboriginal life itself, ranging from low-budget videos made by community-based media associations for both traditional people in remote settlements and groups throughout Central Australia by organisations such as the Central Australian Aboriginal Media Association (CAAMA); to legal or instructional videos (often quite creative) made by land councils as well as health and other service groups; to documentaries and current affairs for national broadcasting; to independent features directed by cosmopolitan Aboriginal artists such as Tracey Moffatt, whose first feature film, Bedevil, premiered at Cannes in 1993.

== 21st century ==
In 2005 CAAMA submitted a report to the Standing Committee on Aboriginal and Torres Strait Islander Affairs’ inquiry into Indigenous employment. The report outlined several ways government leaders could access future policy in regards to Indigenous employment, using CAAMA as a case study. Some key issues CAAMA raised included: skills training; funding; recruitment; increase in Indigenous population; youth employment; strengthening links between education and training; establish and sustain networks between the private and public sectors, alongside the community; and collaborate with pre-existing organisations in training Aboriginal people.

The second section of the report outlined how CAAMA had contributed to the training and employment of Aboriginal people in Central Australia. In their 25 years of operations up until then, CAAMA had had an active "Aboriginalisation policy", which meaning that 65% of employees were Aboriginal. CAAMA had also assisted in the education of over 100 Indigenous people, of whom a majority of their trainees were part of the Major Indigenous Employment Strategy (1988–1993). CAAMA suggested that their success has been afforded by the commitment of government; implementation of the Major Indigenous Employment Strategy; an understanding of social, cultural, and economic issues impacting Aboriginal people; and their flexible learning environment.

In 2009 CAAMA developed a business plan to identity ways to enhance their viability and sustainability with less reliance on government funding, and to increase new opportunities in New Media products and other related services and products.

In March 2020 CAAMA was put under special administration, after its debt level reached $2.7 million. In August 2021 the Registrar of Indigenous Corporations expected the organisation to be released from this administration and a new board appointed soon, after its stations, now operating seven communities, were up and running and making a profit again. CAAMA did, however, still owe $60,000 to the Australian Taxation Office and $850,000 to its major source of funding, the National Indigenous Australians Agency (NIAA).

As of January 2026, CAAMA continues to operate.

== Services ==
=== CAAMA Radio ===
Established as 8KIN-FM in 1980–81, this was the first Aboriginal radio station in the country.

CAAMA Radio provides twenty-four hours Indigenous radio programming to over 600,000 people in Australia. It is the largest Aboriginal media organisation in the country since 1981, with the second largest audience reach in Australia. CAAMA broadcast through 12 Remote Aboriginal Communities Services (RIBS) and a mobile outside broadcasting truck, providing radio to several remote Aboriginal communities in over 30 different languages, including Papunya, Ntaria (Hermannsbug), Ltyentye Apurte (Santa Teresa), and Areyonga.

=== Film and television production ===
CAAMA Productions Pty Ltd is (was? (Note: Not mentioned on website as of August 2021.)) the largest Indigenous owned production house in Australia, with programming based on Indigenous cultures, lifestyle, and issues. Some of CAAMA's award-winning productions include:

- My Colour Your Kind (1998), a short film written and directed by Danielle Maclean which explores the journey of a young Aboriginal albino girl
- Cold Turkey (2003), a film written and directed by Steven McGregor, portraying the lives of brothers Shane and Robby and exploring the changing nature of their relationship
- Green Bush (2005), written and directed by Warwick Thornton, is the story of local radio DJ Kenny and his audience - the local prison inmates
- Double Trouble (Australian TV series) (2007), the first Aboriginal-produced children's television show, which on Nine Network and the Disney Channel
- Samson and Delilah (co-production with Scarlett Pictures), a drama feature film directed by Warwick Thornton and starring Rowan McNamara and Marissa Gibson, both young first time actors. The film competed at the 2009 Cannes Film Festival, winning the Caméra d'Or ('Gold Camera Award' for best first feature film) at the 2009 Cannes Film Festival. The film also won the Asia Pacific Screen Award for Best Film in 2009.

=== Music ===
CAAMA Music is a record label which produces 90% of its recordings in Indigenous languages. Performances organised by CAAMA have been popular with audiences, with people travelling from across the area to attend. One recent event, the Yeperenye Festival, drew a crowd of 30,000. Musicians like Gawurra and Alice Skye, who are recorded by CAAMA are also seen on the Imparja, SBS and ABC television networks. In conjunction with CAAMA Radio, CAAMA Music transmits outside broadcasts of performances by Aboriginal musicians.

== Satellite Dreaming ==
The documentary film Satellite Dreaming was commissioned by Channel 4 in the UK in 1991 as a television series. It was made as a co-production between London-based independent production company APT Film & Television and CAAMA, and was directed and co-produced by Ivo Burum, co-produced by Tony Dowmunt, (Note: "Emeritus Professor in the Department of Media, Commmunications and Culture at Goldsmiths University of London, and was Convenor of the MA Screen Documentary in the Department from 1995-2015... Tony was the UK Producer on the original film, and the Series Coordinator on the Channel 4 Series Channels of Resistance, which showed Satellite Dreaming in the UK in 1993... Tony has been working as the initiator and director of the Satellite Dreaming Revisited project since 2011".) and filmed by Warwick Thornton. The series was broadcast on 3 May 1993 in the UK, and on ABC Television in Australia. The premise of the series was that global television presented a "major threat to cultural and political diversity", and it aimed to present counteractions to this threat, by showing the development of Indigenous media in Australia. A number of people were interviewed for the film, including Rhoda Roberts, who co-presented the SBS Television program First In Line along with Michael Johnson; Lester and Gerry Bostock of Koori Productions; Frances Peters, director of ABC Television, CAAMA co-founder and director Freda Glynn, Phillip Batty, deputy director of CAAMA; Voya Rajic, head of production at SBS Television; Dion Weston, station manager, Imparja TV; Horace Winitja, PY Media Committee; and David Hill, managing director of the ABC. Satellite Dreaming continues to be distributed by Ronin Films in Australia, which describes it as "a film of considerable historic importance".

A website called Satellite Dreaming Revisited, funded by the Leverhulme Trust and developed by Tony Dowmunt at Goldsmiths, University of London (who had co-produced the 1991 film), in collaboration with Nicolas Lee and others at CAAMA Productions, was launched on 11 February 2022, hosted by the Menzies Australia Institute in London. The website includes the full 1993 film and transcript, and looks at progress made in Indigenous media since the original film.

== Notable people ==
Successful CAAMA Indigenous trainees include Erica Glynn, who later became a mentor to a group of young filmmakers in the 1990s, including her son, cinematographer and director Warwick Thornton; Beck Cole; her cousin Danielle MacLean; Steven McGregor; David Jowsey; sound recordist/ director David Tranter; and filmmaker Rachel Perkins.

== See also ==
- History of broadcasting in Australia
- Australian Aboriginal culture
- Indigenous Australian music
- Australian Indigenous Communications Association
- Aboriginal Centre for the Performing Arts
