= Half-caste =

Type of biracial person

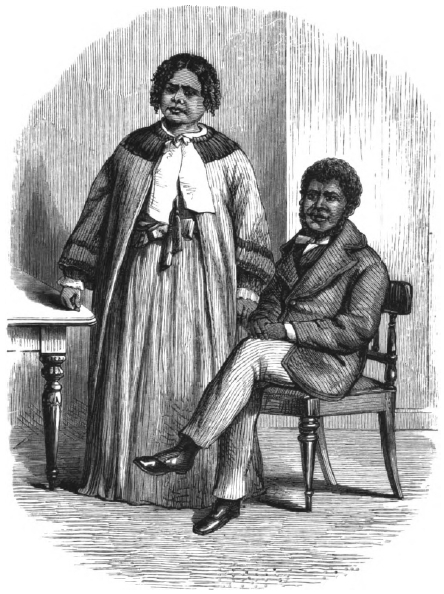
An 1870 illustration by David Bonwick titled Last of the Tasmanians Woodcut 12 - with the description -- Walter George Arthur with his half-caste wife Mary Anne

Half-caste is a term used for individuals of multiracial descent. The word caste is borrowed from the Portuguese or Spanish word casta, meaning race. Terms such as half-caste, caste, quarter-caste and mix-breed were used by colonial officials in the British Empire during their classification of indigenous populations, and in Australia used during the Australian government's pursuit of a policy of assimilation. In Latin America, the equivalent term for half-castes was Cholo and Zambo. Some people now consider the term offensive.

== Use by region ==
=== Australia ===
In Australia, the term "half-caste", along with any other proportional representation of Aboriginality (such as "part-aborigine", "full-blood", "quarter-caste", "octoroon", "mulatto", or "hybrid") are defunct descriptors that are regarded as offensive. Its use is Aboriginal peoples of Australia mostly in historical documents, as it is associated with assimilationist policies of the past. Such terms were widely used in the 19th- and early-20th-century Australian laws to refer to the offspring of European and Aboriginal parents. For example, the Aborigines Protection Act 1886 mentioned half-castes habitually associating with or living with an "Aborigine" (another term no longer favoured), while the Aborigines Amendments between 1934 and 1937 refer to it in various terms, including as a person with less than quadroon blood.

Following the federation of the Australian colonies in 1901, Attorney-General Alfred Deakin ruled that references to "aboriginal natives" in the Australian Constitution did not include half-caste individuals. This definition was carried forward into the first federal welfare legislation, such as the Deakin government's Invalid and Old-Age Pensions Act 1908 and the Fisher government's Maternity Allowance Act 1912, which made half-castes eligible to receive old-age pensions and maternity allowances but excluded individuals "who are Asiatic, or are aboriginal natives of Australia, Papua or the Pacific Islands".

The term was not merely a term of legal convenience; it became a term of common cultural discourse. Christian missionary John Harper, investigating the possibility of establishing of a Christian mission at Batemans Bay, New South Wales, wrote that half-castes and anyone with any Aboriginal connections were considered "degraded as to divine things, almost on a level with a brute, in a state of moral unfitness for heaven".

The term "Half-Caste Act" was given to Acts of Parliament passed in Victoria and Western Australia allowing the seizure of half-caste children and forcible removal from their parents. This was purportedly to provide them with better homes than those afforded by typical Aboriginal people, where they could participate in the domestic economy and for social engineering reasons. The removed children are now known as the Stolen Generations. Other Australian Parliament acts on half-castes and Aboriginal people enacted between 1909 and 1943 were often called "Welfare Acts", but they deprived these people of basic civil, political, and economic rights, and made it illegal to enter public places such as pubs and government institutions, marry, or meet relatives.

=== British Central Africa ===
In British Central Africa, now part of modern-day Malawi and Zimbabwe, people of multiracial descent were referred to as half-castes. These unions were considered socially improper, with mixed couples being segregated and shunned by society at large, and colonial courts passing legislation against mixed marriages.

=== Burma ===
In Burma, a half-caste (or Kabya) was anyone with mixed ethnicity from Burmese and British, or Burmese and Indian. During the period of colonial rule, half-caste people were ostracised and criticised in Burmese literary and political media. For example, a local publication in 1938 published the following:

"You Burmese women who fail to safeguard your own race, after you have married an Indian, your daughter whom you have begotten by such a tie takes an Indian as her husband. As for your son, he becomes a half-caste and tries to get a pure Burmese woman. Not only you but your future generation also is those who are responsible for the ruination of the race."

— An editorial in Burmese Press, 27 November 1938

Similarly, Pu Gale in 1939 wrote Kabya Pyatthana (literally: The Half-Caste Problem), censured Burmese women for enabling half-caste phenomenon, with the claim, "a Burmese woman’s degenerative intercourse with an Indian threatened a spiraling destruction of Burmese society." Such criticism was not limited to a few isolated instances, or just against Burmese girls (thet khit thami), Indians and British husbands. Starting in early 1930s through 1950s, there was an explosion of publications, newspaper articles and cartoons with such social censorship. Included in the criticism were Chinese-Burmese half-castes.

Prior to the explosion in censorship of half-castes in early-20th-century Burma, Thant claims inter-cultural couples such as Burmese-Indian marriages were encouraged by the local population. The situation began to change as colonial developments, allocation of land, rice mills and socio-economic privileges were given to European colonial officials and to Indians who migrated to Burma thanks to economic incentives passed by the Raj. In the late 19th century, the colonial administration viewed intermarriage as a socio-cultural problem. The colonial administration issued circulars prohibiting European officials from conjugal liaisons with Burmese women. In Burma, as in other colonies in Southeast Asia, intimate relations between native women and European men, and the half-caste progeny of such unions were considered harmful to the white minority rule founded upon carefully maintained racial hierarchies.

=== China ===
While the term half-caste tends to evoke the understanding of it referring to the offspring of two persons of two different pure bloods or near pure bloods, in other languages, such as Mandarin Chinese, the words half-caste and mixed ethnicity or multi-ethnic are the same word, hun-xue (混血).

=== Fiji ===
Fijian people of mixed descent were called half-caste, kailoma or vasu. European and Indian immigrants started migrating to Fiji and intermarrying during the period of colonial rule. The colonial government viewed this as a "race problem", as it created a privileged underclass of semi-Europeans who lived on the social fringes in the colonial ordering of Fiji. This legacy continues to affect the ethnic and racial discourse in Fiji.

Kailomas or vasus were children born to a Fijian native and European or indentured laborers brought in by the colonial government to work on sugarcane plantations over a century ago. Over the generations, these half-caste people experienced social shunning and poor treatment from the colonial government, which became determined in herding citizens into separate, tidy, racial boxes, which led to the separation of Fijian mixed-bloods from their natural families.

=== Indian subcontinent ===
Historically, the inter-marriage between men and women of different Indian castes was condemned to prevent half-castes, called Pratiloma and Anuloma.

=== Malaysia ===
Half-caste in Malaysia referred to Eurasians and other people of mixed descents. They were also commonly referred to as hybrids, and in certain sociological literature the term hybridity is common.

With Malaysia experiencing a wave of immigrations from China, the Middle East, India, and southeast Asia, and a wave of different colonial powers (Portuguese, Dutch, English), many other terms have been used for half-castes. Some of these include cap-ceng, half-breed, mesticos. These terms are considered pejorative.

Half-castes of Malaya and other European colonies in Asia have been featured in both non-fiction and fictional works. Brigitte Glaser notes that half-caste characters in literary works from the 18th through the 20th century were predominantly portrayed with prejudice—as degenerate, low, inferior, deviant, or barbaric. Ashcroft, in his review, considers this literary portrayal consistent with the morals and values of the colonial era, when European colonial powers regarded people from different ethnic groups as inherently unequal in abilities, character, and potential. Laws were enacted that made sexual relations and marriage between ethnic groups illegal.

=== New Zealand ===
The term half-caste to classify people based on their birth and ancestry became popular in New Zealand from the early 19th century. Terms such as Anglo-New Zealander suggested by John Polack in 1838, Utu Pihikete and Huipaiana were alternatively but less used.

=== South Africa ===
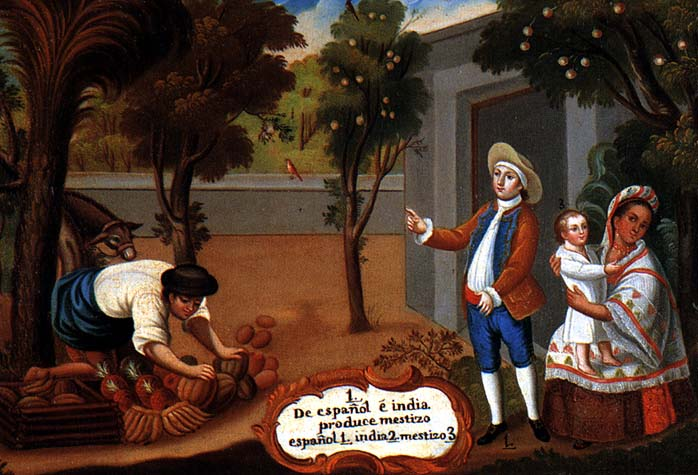
In the 19th century, paintings of half-caste people were in demand and eagerly traded in Europe. Above painting shows Mestizo with caption.

Sociological literature on South Africa, including the pre-colonial, colonial and apartheid eras, refers to half-caste as anyone born from admixing of White and people of color. An alternate, less common term, for half-caste was Mestizzo (conceptually similar to Mestizo in Latin American colonies).

Griqua (Afrikaans: Griekwa) is another term for half-caste people from intermixing in South Africa and Namibia.

People of mixed descent, the half-caste, were considered inferior and slaves by birth in the 19th-century hierarchically arranged, closed colonial social stratification system of South Africa. This was the case even if the father or mother of half-caste person was a European.

Also, during the apartheid eras, Indians were treated as the upper middle class that was virtually superior to half-caste Coloureds.

=== United Kingdom ===
In the United Kingdom, the term when used primarily applies to those of mixed black and white parentage, although can extend to those of differing heritages as well.

Sociologist Peter J. Aspinall argues that the term was coined by 19th-century British colonial administrations, and eventually started to be used as a descriptor of multiracial Britons in the 20th century who had partial white ancestry. From the 1920s to 1960s, Aspinall argues it was "used in Britain as a derogatory racial category associated with the moral condemnation of 'miscegenation'".

The National Union of Journalists has stated that the term half-caste is considered offensive today. The union's guidelines for race reporting instructs journalists to "avoid words that, although common in the past, are now considered offensive". NHS editorial guidance advises "avoid offensive and stereotyping words such as coloured, half-caste and so forth".

== Half-caste in other colonial empires ==
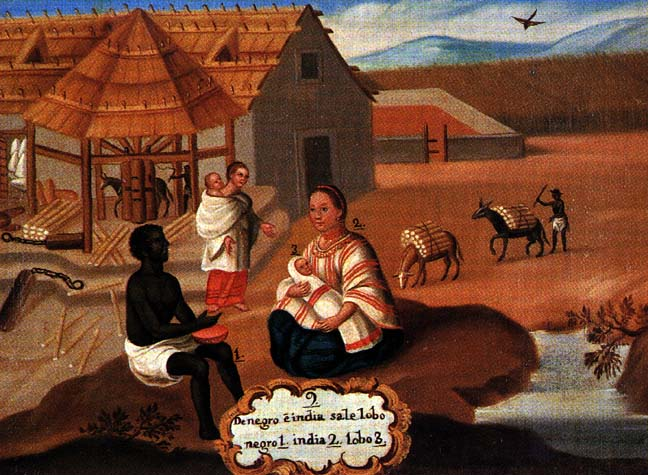
The term half-caste was widely used by colonial administrators in the British Empire. In Spanish colonies, other terms were used, the above painting, for example, shows a Zamba. The caption India in the painting refers to a native American woman.

The term half-caste was common in British colonies, however it was not exclusive to the British Empire. Other colonial empires such as Spain devised terms for mixed-race children. The Spanish colonies devised a complex system of castas, consisting of mulattos, mestizos, and many other descriptors. French colonies used terms such as Métis, while the Portuguese used the term mestiço. French colonies in the Caribbean referred to mixed-race people as Chabine (female) and Chabin (male). Before the American Civil War, the term mestee was commonly applied in the United States to people of mixed descent.

Other terms in use in the colonial era included creole, casco, cafuso, caburet, cattalo, citrange, griffe, half blood, half-bred, half-breed, high yellow, hinny, hybrid, ladino, liger, mamaluco, mixblood, mixed-blood, mongrel, mule, mustee, octoroon, plumcot, quadroon, quintroon, sambo, tangelo, xibaro. The difference between these terms of various European colonies usually was the race, ethnicity or caste of the father and the mother.

Ann Laura Stoler has published a series of reviews on ethnic intermixing during the colonial era. She states that colonial control was predicated on distinguishing who was white and who was native, determining which children could become citizens of the empire and who remained subjects, as well as who had hereditary rights and who did not. These issues were debated by colonial administrators and led to regulations imposed by the authorities. At the start of colonial empires, mostly European males—and later indentured laborers from India, China, and Southeast Asia—traveled to distant colonies; during this early period, intermixing was accepted, approved, and even encouraged. Over time, however, differences were emphasized, and colonial authorities moved to restrict, then disapprove, and finally forbid sexual relationships between groups to maintain so-called purity of blood and limit inheritable rights.

== See also ==
=== General concepts ===
- Race (human classification)
- Caste
- Miscegenation
- Euphemism treadmill

=== Historical applications of the mixed-caste concept ===
- Between white/European and black/African:

- Mulatto
- Quadroon
- Octoroon

- Between white/European and Native American / American Indian:

- Mestee

- Métis, a people descended from fur traders (Scottish and French-Canadian) and their native wives

- Mestizo, a word common in Latin America, particularly Mexico

- Between white and Asian:

- Kutcha butcha
- Anglo-Indian
- Luso-Indian
- Burgher people, partly European and partly Sri Lankan.
- Eurasian (mixed ancestry)
- Indo people (similar group in the Dutch East Indies)

- Other:

- Mischling (formerly used German expression for a person of mixed ancestry. In Nazi Germany term for persons defined under the Nuremberg Laws as being non-Jewish but as having a significant amount of Jewish ancestry/"blood". Since then regarded as pejorative.)

- In literature:

- Half Caste (poem)
- Half-elf (also "halfling" under some uses of the term), a human–elf hybrid featured in many works of fantasy literature and, as a character class and/or a description of a non-playing character, in many role-playing games derived from or inspired by the fantasy genre
